= List of radio stations in Florida =

The following is a list of FCC-licensed radio stations in the U.S. state of Florida, which can be sorted by their call signs, frequencies, cities of license, licensees, and programming formats.

== List of radio stations ==
Call sign	Frequency	City of license	Licensee	Format
Radio Martí	1180 AM	Marathon	U.S. Agency for Global Media	Spanish talk
WAAZ-FM	104.7 FM	Crestview	Crestview Broadcasting Company, Inc.	Country
WACC	830 AM	Hialeah	Radio Peace Catholic Broadcasting, Inc.	Spanish Catholic
WAFC	590 AM	Clewiston	Crestview Broadcasting Company, Inc.	Classic Country
WAFG-LP	107.1 FM	Pompano Beach	Calvary Chapel Pompano Beach, Inc.	Religious Teaching
WAFZ	1490 AM	Immokalee	Glades Media Company LLP	Regional Mexican
WAFZ-FM	92.1 FM	Immokalee	Glades Media Company LLC	Regional Mexican
WAIG-LP	106.3 FM	Daytona Beach	Rhema Broadcasting, Inc.	Urban gospel
WAIL	99.5 FM	Key West	Florida Keys Media, LLC	Classic rock
WAJD	1390 AM	Gainesville	Gillen Broadcasting Corporation	Urban contemporary
WAKJ	91.3 FM	DeFuniak Springs	First Baptist Church, Inc.	Christian
WAKU	94.1 FM	Crawfordville	Altrua Investments International Corp.	Contemporary Christian
WAKX	98.7 FM	Palm Coast	Flagler County Broadcasting, LLC	Country
WAMA	1550 AM	Tampa	Q Broadcasting Corporation	Regional Mexican
WAMR-FM	107.5 FM	Miami	Univision Radio Illinois, Inc.	Spanish AC and Tropical
WAMT	1190 AM	Pine Castle-Sky Lake	Relevant Radio, Inc.	Catholic
WANM	90.5 FM	Tallahassee	Florida A & M University	Urban
WAOA-FM	107.1 FM	Melbourne	Cumulus Licensing LLC	Top 40 (CHR)
WAOC	1420 AM	St. Augustine	Good Tidings Trust, Inc.	Christian talk
WAPB	91.7 FM	Madison	Public Radio, Inc.	Religious
WAPE-FM	95.1 FM	Jacksonville	Cox Radio, LLC	Top 40 (CHR)
WAPN	91.5 FM	Holly Hill	Public Radio, Inc.	Contemporary Christian
WAPQ-LP	95.9 FM	Avon Park	Highlands Christian Education Station	Religious (Radio 74 Internationale)
WAQI	710 AM	Miami	Latino Media Network, LLC	Spanish
WAQV	90.9 FM	Crystal River	Radio Training Network, Inc.	Contemporary Christian
WARO	94.5 FM	Naples	Sun Broadcasting Inc.	Classic rock
WASJ	105.1 FM	Panama City Beach	RoRo Investments, LLC	Christian radio
WAUC	1310 AM	Wauchula	Marvina Enterprises, Inc.	Regional Mexican
WAVK	97.7 FM	Marathon	Florida Keys Media, LLC	Sports (ISN/FSR)
WAVP	1390 AM	Avon Park	Walco Enterprises, LLC	Variety
WAVS	1170 AM	Davie	Alliance Broadcasting, Inc.	Caribbean
WAVV	101.1 FM	Naples Park	Fort Myers Broadcasting Company	Soft adult contemporary
WAVW	92.7 FM	Stuart	iHM Licenses, LLC	Country
WAVX-LP	107.1 FM	Ormond Beach	Reign Radio Ministries, Inc.	Variety
WAXY	790 AM	South Miami	Audacy License, LLC	Spanish adult contemporary and conservative talk
WAYF	88.1 FM	West Palm Beach	Hope Media Group	Contemporary Christian
WAYG-LP	104.7 FM	Miami	Calvary Chapel Miami	Religious Teaching
WAYJ	89.5 FM	Naples	Hope Media Group	Contemporary Christian
WAYL	91.9 FM	St. Augustine	Delmarva Educational Association	Contemporary Christian
WAYP	88.3 FM	Marianna	Hope Media Group	Contemporary Christian
WAYR	550 AM	Fleming Island	Good Tidings Trust, Inc.	Christian talk
WBCG	98.9 FM	Murdock	iHM Licenses, LLC	Classic rock
WBCN	770 AM	North Fort Myers	Beasley Media Group, LLC	Silent
WBGC	1240 AM	Chipley	Arthur J. Collier, III, Executor	Variety
WBGF	93.5 FM	Belle Glade	Zoo Communications, LLC	Dance
WBGG-FM	105.9 FM	Fort Lauderdale	iHM Licenses, LLC	Classic hits
WBGY	90.3 FM	Naples	Kol Halev 2020 Corporation	Adult contemporary music, Talk, News
WBHQ	92.7 FM	Beverly Beach	Flagler County Broadcasting, LLC	Adult hits
WBHU	105.5 FM	St. Augustine Beach	Flagler Broadcasting, LLC	Adult hits
WBIY	88.3 FM	La Belle	Association des Haitiens Vivant a l'Etranger pour le Develop	Religious
WBOB	600 AM	Jacksonville	Chesapeake-Portsmouth Broadcasting Corporation	Talk
WBOF-LP	105.9 FM	Fort Pierce	Faith Baptist Church of Fort Pierce, Florida, Inc.	Christian
WBPC	95.1 FM	Ebro	Beach Radio, Inc.	Classic hits
WBPU-LP	96.3 FM	St. Petersburg	African People's Education and Defense Fund, Inc.	Variety
WBPV-LP	100.1 FM	Bradenton	Peace Education and Action Center, Inc.	Variety
WBRD	1420 AM	Palmetto	Birach Broadcasting Corporation	Regional Mexican
WBSR	1450 AM	Pensacola	Miracle Radio, Inc.	Sports (FSR)
WBTP	106.5 FM	Sarasota	iHM Licenses, LLC	Classic hip hop
WBTT	105.5 FM	Naples Park	iHM Licenses, LLC	Rhythmic contemporary
WBUJ-LP	99.5 FM	Miami Shores	Barry University	Variety
WBVL-LP	99.7 FM	Kissimmee	Sucremedia, Inc.	Spanish adult contemporary
WBVM	90.5 FM	Tampa	Bishop of the Diocese of St. Petersburg	Catholic
WBZE	98.9 FM	Tallahassee	Cumulus Licensing LLC	Adult contemporary
WBZT	1230 AM	West Palm Beach	iHM Licenses, LLC	Sports gambling (VSIN)
WCCF	1580 AM	Punta Gorda	iHM Licenses, LLC	News/Talk
WCFB	94.5 FM	Daytona Beach	Cox Radio, LLC	Urban adult contemporary
WCGL	1360 AM	Jacksonville	JBD Communications, Inc.	Gospel
WCIE	91.5 FM	New Port Richey	Radio Training Network, Inc.	Contemporary Christian
WCIF	106.3 FM	Melbourne	First Baptist Church, Inc.	Christian
WCIW-LP	107.7 FM	Immokalee	Interfaith Action of Southwest Florida, Inc.	Spanish Religious/Pacifica
WCJX	106.5 FM	Five Points	RTG Radio, LLC, Debtor-in-Possession	Hot adult contemporary
WCKP-LP	100.7 FM	Ocala	Musical Performance Group of Ocala, Inc.	Religious Teaching
WCKT	107.1 FM	Lehigh Acres	iHM Licenses, LLC	Country
WCMQ-FM	92.3 FM	Hialeah	WCMQ Licensing, Inc.	Salsa music
WCNK	98.7 FM	Key West	Florida Keys Media, LLC	Country
WCNO	89.9 FM	Palm City	National Christian Network, Inc.	Religious
WCNZ	1660 AM	Marco Island	Relevant Radio, Inc.	Spanish Tropical/Hispanic Urban
WCOA	1370 AM	Pensacola	Cumulus Licensing LLC	News/Talk
WCPL-LP	95.5 FM	Merritt Island	David Crawford	Contemporary Christian
WCRJ	88.1 FM	Jacksonville	Radio Training Network, Inc.	Contemporary Christian
WCTH	100.3 FM	Plantation Key	Florida Keys Media, LLC	Country
WCTQ	92.1 FM	Venice	iHM Licenses, LLC	Classic country
WCVC	1330 AM	Tallahassee	La Promesa Foundation	Catholic
WCVU	104.9 FM	Solana	iHM Licenses, LLC	Oldies
WCXS	1480 AM	Arcadia	Fiorini Broadcasting LLC	Classic country
WCYZ	99.7 FM	Ocala	RDA Broadcast Holdings	Christian adult contemporary
WCZR	101.7 FM	Vero Beach	iHM Licenses, LLC	Talk
WDAE	620 AM	St. Petersburg	iHM Licenses, LLC	Sports (ESPN/FSR)
WDBO	580 AM	Orlando	Cox Radio, LLC	News/Talk
WDBW-LP	97.3 FM	Port Saint Joe	Long Avenue Baptist Church	Religious (Bible Broadcasting Network)
WDCF	1350 AM	Dade City	Radio World, Inc.	Talk
WDIZ	1320 AM	Venice	iHM Licenses, LLC	Oldies
WDJA	1420 AM	Delray Beach	Radio Cristo Mi Redentor Universo 1420AM Inc.	Talk
WDJZ	1590 AM	South Daytona	Glenn Cherry	Talk
WDKK-LP	101.1 FM	North Dade	American Multi-Media Syndicate Inc	Variety
WDLN-LP	104.9 FM	Dunnellon	KKL Diversity Group	Variety
WDLV	88.7 FM	Fort Myers	Educational Media Foundation	Contemporary Christian (K-Love)
WDMC	920 AM	Melbourne	Divine Mercy Communications, Inc.	Catholic
WDNA	88.9 FM	Miami	Bascomb Memorial Broadcasting Foundation	Jazz
WDOZ	91.7 FM	Pierson	Central Florida Educational Foundation, Inc.	Contemporary Christian
WDPI-LP	100.5 FM	Palatka	Downtown Palatka, Inc.	Variety
WDPT-LP	103.9 FM	Panama City	St. Dominic's Media Production Center, Inc.	Catholic
WDSR	1340 AM	Lake City	Newman Media, Inc.	News Talk Information
WDUV	105.5 FM	New Port Richey	Cox Radio, LLC	Soft adult contemporary
WDVH	980 AM	Gainesville	Marc Radio Gainesville, LLC	Urban oldies
WDVH-FM	101.7 FM	Trenton	Radio Training Network	Contemporary Christian
WDVS-LP	101.1 FM	Miami	South Florida FM Inc	Variety
WDWR	1230 AM	Pensacola	La Promesa Foundation	Catholic
WDXD-LP	101.9 FM	Tallahassee	Delta Star Radio of Florida, Inc.	Christian, classic country
WDYZ	660 AM	Altamonte Springs	JVC Mergeco, LLC	Regional Mexican
WDZP-LP	101.1 FM	West Palm Beach	WDZP Media Inc	R&B
WEAG-FM	106.3 FM	Starke	Dickerson Broadcasting, Inc.	Country
WEAT	107.9 FM	West Palm Beach	WPB FCC License Sub, LLC	Classic hits
WEBY	1330 AM	Milton	ADX Communications of Milton, LLC	Sports (ESPN)
WEBZ	99.3 FM	Mexico Beach	iHM Licenses, LLC	Urban contemporary
WECA-LP	105.7 FM	Palm Bay	New Birth F. Baptist Church, Inc.	Religious Teaching
WBON	92.1 FM	Destin	JVC Mergeco, LLC	Mainstream rock
WEDR	99.1 FM	Miami	Cox Radio, LLC	Urban contemporary
WEFA-LP	92.5 FM	Ocala	Marion Community Services, Assoc.	Soft adult contemporary
WEFL	760 AM	Tequesta	Good Karma Broadcasting, L.L.C.	Spanish sports
WEGI-LP	103.5 FM	Immokalee	Bethel Assembly of God, Inc	Religious Teaching
WEGS	91.7 FM	Milton	Florida Public Radio, Inc.	Contemporary Christian
WEHR-LP	100.7 FM	Port St. Lucie	Eternal Hope Radio Broadcasting Corporation	Christian
WEJF	90.3 FM	Palm Bay	Florida Public Radio, Inc.	Contemporary Christian
WEJZ	96.1 FM	Jacksonville	Renda Broadcasting Corporation of Nevada	Adult contemporary
WELE	1380 AM	Ormond Beach	Bethune-Cookman University	News/Talk
WENG	1530 AM	Englewood	Fiorini Broadcasting, LLC	News/Talk
WEOW	92.7 FM	Key West	Florida Keys Media, LLC	Top 40 (CHR)
WERF-LP	105.7 FM	Gainesville	Florida Educational Broadcasting, Inc.	Top 40
WESP	106.3 FM	Jupiter	Good Karma Broadcasting, LLC	Sports (ESPN)
WEWC	1160 AM	Callahan	Norsan Consulting And Management, Inc.	Spanish Tropical
WEXI-LP	102.3 FM	Hallandale	The Truth Will Set You Free Inc.	Religious Teaching
WEXY	1520 AM	Wilton Manors	Multicultural Radio Broadcasting Licensee, LLC	Religious
WEZI	102.9 FM	Jacksonville	Cox Radio, LLC	Adult contemporary
WFBB-LP	97.5 FM	Glen St. Mary	First Baptist Church	Contemporary Christian
WFBU-LP	94.7 FM	Graceville	The Baptist College of Florida, Inc.	Contemporary Christian
WFCF	88.5 FM	St. Augustine	Flagler College	College
WFCT	105.5 FM	Apalachicola	Williams Communications, Inc.	Adult contemporary
WFCX	100.5 FM	Apalachicola	East Bay Broadcasting, Inc.	Tropical rock
WFDA-LP	99.3 FM	Live Oak	WOLR 91.3 FM, Inc.	Religious Teaching
WFDZ	93.5 FM	Perry	Dockins Communications, Inc.	Country
WFEZ	93.1 FM	Miami	Cox Radio, LLC	Soft adult contemporary
WFFG	1300 AM	Marathon	The Great Marathon Radio Company	News/Talk
WFFL	91.7 FM	Panama City	Family Worship Center Church, Inc.	Religious
WFFY	98.5 FM	San Carlos Park	Sun Broadcasting Inc.	Urban contemporary
WFIT	89.5 FM	Melbourne	The Florida Institute of Technology	Jazz
WFKS	95.1 FM	Melbourne	iHM Licenses, LLC	Rhythmic contemporary
WFKZ	103.1 FM	Plantation Key	Florida Keys Media, LLC	Classic rock
WFLA	970 AM	Tampa	iHM Licenses, LLC	News/Talk
WFLA-FM	100.7 FM	Midway	iHM Licenses, LLC	Talk
WFLC	97.3 FM	Miami	Cox Radio, LLC	Rhythmic hot adult contemporary
WFLF	540 AM	Pine Hills	iHM Licenses, LLC	News/Talk
WFLF-FM	94.5 FM	Parker	iHM Licenses, LLC	Active rock
WFLJ	89.3 FM	Frostproof	Radio Training Network, Inc.	Contemporary Christian
WFLL	1400 AM	Fort Lauderdale	International Church of the Grace of God, Inc.	Caribbean
WFLM	91.1 FM	Fort Pierce	Indian River State College	Urban adult contemporary
WFLV	90.7 FM	West Palm Beach	Educational Media Foundation	Contemporary Christian (K-Love)
WFLZ-FM	93.3 FM	Tampa	iHM Licenses, LLC	Top 40 (CHR)
WFOY	1240 AM	St. Augustine	Local Matters Broadcasting	News/Talk
WFPF-LP	92.7 FM	Frostproof	Frostproof Christian Educational Radio, Inc.	Religious (Radio 74 Internationale)
WFRF	1070 AM	Tallahassee	Faith Radio Network, Inc.	Contemporary Christian
WFRF-FM	105.7 FM	Monticello	Faith Radio Network, Inc.	Contemporary Christian
WFRU	90.1 FM	Quincy	Faith Radio Network, Inc.	Contemporary Christian
WFSD-LP	107.9 FM	Tallahassee	Tallahassee First Seventh-Day Adventist Church	Christian
WFSQ	91.5 FM	Tallahassee	Florida State University	Classical
WFSU-FM	88.9 FM	Tallahassee	Florida State University	Public radio
WFSW	89.1 FM	Panama City	Florida State University	Public radio
WFSX-FM	92.5 FM	Estero	Sun Broadcasting Inc.	News/Talk
WFSY	98.5 FM	Panama City	iHM Licenses, LLC	Adult contemporary
WFTL	850 AM	West Palm Beach	WPB FCC License Sub, LLC	News/Talk
WFTW	1260 AM	Fort Walton Beach	Cumulus Licensing LLC	News/Talk
WFUG-LP	107.7 FM	Lehigh Acres	Ministerio Cristiano Principe de Paz Inc.	Spanish religious
WFUS	103.5 FM	Gulfport	iHM Licenses, LLC	Country
WFWO	106.9 FM	Fort Walton Beach	JVC Broadcasting	Spanish tropical
WFXJ	930 AM	Jacksonville	iHM Licenses, LLC	Sports (FSR)
WFYY	103.1 FM	Windermere	JVC Mergeco, LLC	Spanish tropical
WGAY	105.7 FM	Sugarloaf Key	Magnum Broadcasting, Inc.	Dance
WGCU-FM	90.1 FM	Ft. Myers	Board of Trustees, Florida Gulf Coast University	Public radio
WGES	680 AM	St. Petersburg	Vision Communications Network, Inc.	Spanish
WGGF-LP	100.1 FM	Sun City Center	Community Radio of Sun City Center, Inc.	Variety
WGGM-LP	90.5 FM	Fort Myers	Dunbar Gospel Association of Southwest Florida, Inc.	Urban Gospel/R&B
WGGP-LP	106.7 FM	Big Pine Key	First Baptist Church Big Pine Key	Religious Teaching
WGHR	106.3 FM	Spring Hill	WGUL-FM, Inc.	Classic hits
WGLF	104.1 FM	Tallahassee	Cumulus Licensing LLC	Classic hits
WGLJ-LP	94.7 FM	Gainesville	Calvary Chapel Gainesville, Inc.	Religious Teaching
WGMX	94.3 FM	Marathon	The Great Marathon Radio Company	Silent
WGNE-FM	99.9 FM	Middleburg	Renda Broadcasting Corporation of Nevada	Country
WGNK	88.3 FM	Pennsuco	Genesis License Subsidiary LLC	Religious
WGRL-LP	95.9 FM	Saint Cloud	K & A Broadcasting Group Corp	Spanish religious
WGSG	89.5 FM	Mayo	Family Worship Center Church, Inc.	Southern gospel
WGSX	104.3 FM	Lynn Haven	Horizon Broadcasting Company, LLC	Sports (ESPN/FSR)
WGTT	91.5 FM	Emeralda	Bible Clarity	Religious
WGUF	98.9 FM	Marco	Renda Broadcasting Corporation of Nevada	Soft oldies
WGUL	860 AM	Dunedin	Caron Broadcasting, Inc.	News/Talk
WGVC-LP	104.1 FM	Gainesville	Gainesville Seventh-Day Adventist Church	Christian
WGVR-LP	103.3 FM	Gainesville	Radio Gainesville, Inc.	Oldies
WGYL	93.7 FM	Vero Beach	Vero Beach Broadcasters, LLC	Hot adult contemporary
WHBO	1040 AM	Pinellas Park	Genesis Communications of Tampa Bay, Inc.	Conservative talk
WHBX	96.1 FM	Tallahassee	Cumulus Licensing LLC	Urban adult contemporary
WHEL	93.7 FM	Sanibel	Sun Broadcasting Inc.	Top 40 (CHR)
WHGN	91.9 FM	Crystal River	The Moody Bible Institute of Chicago	Religious
WHGV	99.5 FM	La Crosse	RDA Broadcast Holdings, LLC	Christian adult contemporary
WHHZ	100.5 FM	Newberry	Marc Radio Gainesville, LLC	Alternative rock
WHIF	91.3 FM	Palatka	Putnam Radio Ministries, Inc.	Contemporary Christian
WHIJ	88.1 FM	Ocala	Radio Training Network, Inc.	Contemporary Christian
WHIM-LP	99.5 FM	Hialeah Gardens	Iglesia Misionera Pregoneros de Justicia de Florida, Inc.	Spanish religious
WHJX	106.5 FM	Ponte Vedra Beach	Cox Radio, LLC	Urban adult contemporary
WHKR	102.7 FM	Rockledge	Cumulus Licensing LLC	Country
WHLG	101.3 FM	Port St. Lucie	Radio Training Network, Inc.	Contemporary Christian
WHMF	91.1 FM	Marianna	Radio 74 Internationale	Religious (Radio 74 Internationale)
WHNJ	95.7 FM	Big Pine Key	Multicare Foundation, Inc.	Religious
WHNR	1360 AM	Cypress Gardens	Walco Enterprises, LLC	Urban adult contemporary
WHNZ	1250 AM	Tampa	iHM Licenses, LLC	Talk/Business
WHOG-FM	95.7 FM	Ormond-By-The-Sea	Black Crow Radio, LLC, Debtor-in-Possession	Classic rock
WHOO	1080 AM	Kissimmee	Relevant Radio, Inc.	Catholic religious
WHOT	1590 AM	Palm River-Clair Mel	Tampa Radio, Inc.	Haitian Creole
WHPB-LP	98.5 FM	Orlando	Howell Family Consultant Inc.	Urban
WHPT	102.5 FM	Sarasota	Cox Radio, LLC	Hot talk
WHQT	105.1 FM	Coral Gables	Cox Radio, LLC	Urban adult contemporary
WHTF	104.9 FM	Havana	ARG of Tallahassee LLC	Top 40 (CHR)
WHWY	98.1 FM	Holt	JVC Mergeco, LLC	Country
WHYI-FM	100.7 FM	Fort Lauderdale	iHM Licenses, LLC	Top 40 (CHR)
WHYZ	91.1 FM	Palm Coast	Central Florida Educational Foundation, Inc	Contemporary Christian
WIDT-LP	99.7 FM	Winter Garden	LLAAB Inc.	Regional Mexican
WIEB-LP	102.9 FM	Ocala	Institucion Educativa Bethel	Spanish religious
WIFL-LP	104.5 FM	Weirsdale	Lake Weir Chamber of Commerce	Variety
WIGW	90.3 FM	Eustis	Relevant Radio, Inc.	Religious
WIIS	106.9 FM	Key West	Keyed Up Communications Company	Alternative rock
WIKD-LP	102.5 FM	Daytona Beach	Embry–Riddle Aeronautical University	Variety
WIKX	92.9 FM	Charlotte Harbor	iHM Licenses, LLC	Country
WILA	100.1 FM	Live Oak	Learning Avenue, Inc.	Religious (3ABN)
WILN	105.9 FM	Panama City	Magic Broadcasting II, LLC	Top 40 (CHR)
WIME-LP	99.9 FM	Orlando	Musica Sublime Inc.	Spanish adult contemporary
WIMR-LP	96.5 FM	Mcintosh	Mcintosh Community Radio Assoc	Country
WINK-FM	96.9 FM	Fort Myers	Fort Myers Broadcasting Company	Adult contemporary
WINZ	940 AM	Miami	iHM Licenses, LLC	Sports (FSR)
WIOD	610 AM	Miami	iHM Licenses, LLC	News/Talk
WIPC	1280 AM	Lake Wales	Super W Media Group, Inc.	Spanish
WIPU-LP	106.3 FM	Pembroke Pines	The Rock Church of Hollywood Inc	Religious Teaching
WIRK	103.1 FM	Indiantown	WPB FCC License Sub, LLC	Country
WITG-LP	104.7 FM	Ocala	Great God Gospel & Educational Station, Inc.	Christian rock
WITS	1340 AM	Sebring	Cohan Radio Group, Inc.	Classic hits
WIWA	1270 AM	Eatonville	Marc Radio Orlando, LLC	Spanish
WIXC	1060 AM	Titusville	Genesis Communications I, Inc.	Spanish sports
WIYD	1260 AM	Palatka	Natkim Radio, LLC	Country
WJAQ	100.9 FM	Marianna	MFR, Inc.	Country
WJBR	1010 AM	Seffner	Beasley Media Group Licenses, LLC	All-podcasts
WJBT	93.3 FM	Green Cove Springs	iHM Licenses, LLC	Urban contemporary
WJBW	1000 AM	Jupiter	WJBW LLC	Adult hits
WJCC	1700 AM	Miami Springs	Multicultural Radio Broadcasting Licensee, LLC	World Ethnic
WJCM	1050 AM	Sebring	Cohan Radio Group, Inc.	Sports (ESPN)
WJCT-FM	89.9 FM	Jacksonville	WJCT, Inc.	Public radio
WJDS-LP	106.9 FM	Palm Coast	Hammock Educational and Environmental Community Services	Spanish religious
WJEW-LP	95.3 FM	Miami	Ministerio Internacional Dios Te Ama Corp	Spanish Religious
WJFH	91.7 FM	Sebring	Radio Training Network, Inc.	Contemporary Christian
WJFR	88.7 FM	Jacksonville	Family Stations, Inc.	Religious (Family Radio)
WJFU-LP	105.5 FM	White Springs	People Network, Inc	Variety
WJGL	96.9 FM	Jacksonville	Cox Radio, LLC	Classic hits
WJGM	105.7 FM	Baldwin	West Jacksonville Baptist Church, Inc.	Gospel
WJGO	102.9 FM	Tice	Renda Broadcasting Corporation of Nevada	Adult hits
WJHC	107.5 FM	Jasper	Smalltown Broadcasting, LLC	News/Talk
WJHM	101.9 FM	Daytona Beach	Audacy License, LLC	Classic hip hop
WJIS	88.1 FM	Bradenton	Radio Training Network, Inc.	Contemporary Christian
WJKD	99.7 FM	Vero Beach	Vero Beach FM Radio Partnership	Adult hits
WJKV	90.9 FM	Jacksonville	Educational Media Foundation	Contemporary Christian (K-Love)
WJLF	91.7 FM	Gainesville	Radio Training Network, Inc.	Contemporary Christian
WJLH	90.3 FM	Flagler Beach	Cornerstone Broadcasting Corporation	Contemporary Christian
WJLN	88.7 FM	White Springs	Faith and Action Community Outreach, Inc.	Urban gospel
WJLU	89.7 FM	New Smyrna Beach	Cornerstone Broadcasting Corporation	Contemporary Christian
WJNJ	1320 AM	Jacksonville	Norsan Media And Consulting, Inc.	Spanish AC
WJNO	1290 AM	West Palm Beach	iHM Licenses, LLC	News/Talk
WJNX	1330 AM	Fort Pierce	Port St. Lucie Broadcasters, Inc.	Regional Mexican
WJNX-FM	106.1 FM	Okeechobee	BMZ Broadcasting, LLC	Regional Mexican
WJPP-LP	100.1 FM	Palm City	Prince of Peace Communications, Inc.	Catholic
WJPT	106.3 FM	Fort Myers	Beasley Media Group, LLC	Soft adult contemporary
WJRN-LP	95.9 FM	Summerfield	Hispanic-Multicultural Broadcasting Association	Spanish
WJRQ-LP	99.9 FM	Poinciana	Hispanic Women of Poinciana Corp	Variety
WJRR	101.1 FM	Cocoa Beach	iHM Licenses, LLC	Active rock
WJSB	1050 AM	Crestview	Crestview Broadcasting Company., Inc.	Country
WJTF	89.9 FM	Panama City	Family Life Broadcasting, Inc.	Religious (Family Life Radio)
WJTK	96.5 FM	Columbia City	Dockins Broadcast Group, LLC	News/Talk
WJTQ	100.7 FM	Pensacola	Cumulus Licensing LLC	Classic hits
WJUF	90.1 FM	Inverness	Board of Trustees, University of Florida	News/Talk
WJUP-LP	103.9 FM	Jupiter	Jupiter Community Radio, Inc.	Adult standards
WJVE-LP	97.1 FM	Debary	Ministerio R.M., Inc.	Spanish Religious
WJWY-LP	92.3 FM	Wauchula	Wauchula Educational Broadcasting Corporation	Religious (Radio 74 Internationale)
WJXL	1010 AM	Jacksonville Beach	Seven Bridges Radio, LLC	Sports (VSiN)
WJXL-FM	92.5 FM	Jacksonville Beach	River City Broadcasting, LLC	Sports (ISN)
WJXO	1580 AM	Chattahoochee	Mount Vernon Broadcasting LLC	
WJXR	92.1 FM	Macclenny	Norsan WJXR, LLC	Spanish Tropical
WJYO	91.5 FM	Fort Myers	Airwaves For Jesus, Inc.	Christian
WJZK-LP	97.3 FM	Ft. Walton Beach	Thunderbolt Broadcasting Company	Smooth jazz
WJZS	106.1 FM	Live Oak	Southern Communications, LLC	Contemporary Christian
WKAT	1450 AM	Miami	Radio Piment Zouk, Inc.	Spanish
WKES	91.1 FM	Lakeland	The Moody Bible Institute of Chicago	Contemporary Christian
WKEY-FM	93.7 FM	Key West	Radio One Key West, LLC	Yacht rock
WKEZ-FM	96.9 FM	Tavernier	Magnum Broadcasting, Inc.	Conservative talk
WKFA	89.3 FM	St. Catherine	Florida Public Radio, Inc.	Christian talk
WKFL	1170 AM	Bushnell	Walco Enterprises, LLC	Classic country
WKGC-FM	90.7 FM	Panama City	Gulf Coast Community College	Public radio
WKGR	98.7 FM	Fort Pierce/Wellington	iHM Licenses, LLC	Mainstream rock
WKIQ	1240 AM	Eustis	Unity Broadcasting LLC	Talk
WKIS	99.9 FM	Boca Raton	Audacy License, LLC	Country
WKLG	102.1 FM	Rock Harbor	WKLG, Inc.	Adult contemporary
WKNK	103.5 FM	Callaway	RoRo Investments, LLC	Spanish Christian
WKOT-LP	102.1 FM	Winauma	New Beginning Baptist Temple	Religious Teaching
WKPX	88.5 FM	Sunrise	School Board of Broward County, Florida	Adult album alternative
WKQK	1300 AM	Cocoa Beach	321 Corporation	News/Talk
WKRO-FM	93.1 FM	Port Orange	Southern Stone Communications of Florida, LLC	Country
WKSL	97.9 FM	Neptune Beach	iHM Licenses, LLC	Top 40 (CHR)
WKSM	99.5 FM	Fort Walton Beach	Cumulus Licensing LLC	Mainstream rock
WKTK	98.5 FM	Crystal River	Audacy License, LLC	Adult contemporary
WKTO	88.9 FM	Edgewater	Mims Community Radio, Inc.	Contemporary Christian
WKTZ	1220 AM	Jacksonville	American Family Association	Religious Teaching (AFR)
WKVH	91.9 FM	Monticello	Educational Media Foundation	Contemporary Christian (K-Love)
WKWF	1600 AM	Key West	Spottswood Partners II, Ltd.	Classic jazz standards
WKWJ	91.9 FM	Key West	Christian Radio Fellowship, Inc.	Contemporary Christian
WKWM	91.5 FM	Marathon	The School Board of Miami – Dade County, Florida	Public radio
WKWR	89.9 FM	Key West	Educational Media Foundation	Contemporary Christian (K-Love)
WKYZ	101.7 FM	Key Colony Beach	Keys Media Company, Inc.	Classic rock
WKZM	104.3 FM	Sarasota	The Moody Bible Institute of Chicago	Religious
WLAA	1600 AM	Winter Garden	Unity Broadcasting LLC	Regional Mexican
WLAZ	89.1 FM	Kissimmee	Caguas Educational TV, Inc.	Spanish Contemporary Christian
WLBE	790 AM	Leesburg-Eustis	Q-Broadcasting Corporation	Regional Mexican
WLCC	760 AM	Brandon	Salem Communications Holding Corporation	Catholic
WLDI	95.5 FM	Fort Pierce	iHM Licenses, LLC	Top 40 (CHR)
WLFE	90.9 FM	Cutler Bay	Hope Media Group	Contemporary Christian
WLGM-LP	93.9 FM	Edgewater	Edgewater Alliance Church	Religious
WLJM-LP	95.3 FM	Miami Beach	Calvary Chapel of Miami Beach, Inc.	Religious Teaching
WLKF	1430 AM	Lakeland	Hall Communications, Inc.	Talk
WLLD	94.1 FM	Lakeland	Beasley Media Group Licenses, LLC	Rhythmic contemporary
WLLJ-LP	107.7 FM	Cape Coral	Radio 1077 WLLJ, Inc.	Christian
WLLY-FM	99.5 FM	Palm Beach Gardens	Glades Media Company LLP	Regional Mexican
WLML-FM	100.3 FM	Lake Park	Robinson Entertainment LLC	Adult standards
WLOV-FM	99.5 FM	Daytona Beach Shores	Southern Broadcasting of Pensacola, Inc.	Classic hits
WLPM-LP	95.7 FM	Christmas	Orange Blossom Community Media Association	Religious
WLQH	940 AM	Chiefland	Suncoast Radio, Inc.	Classic country
WLQY	1320 AM	Hollywood	Entravision Holdings, LLC	Ethnic
WLRN-FM	91.3 FM	Miami	The School Board of Miami-Dade County, Florida	Public radio
WLRQ-FM	99.3 FM	Cocoa	iHM Licenses, LLC	Adult contemporary
WLSF	88.3 FM	Starke	Educational Media Foundation	Contemporary Christian (K-Love)
WLSL-LP	92.7 FM	Saint Leo	Saint Leo University Incorporated	Variety
WLSS	930 AM	Sarasota	Caron Broadcasting, Inc.	Talk
WLTG	1430 AM	Upper Grand Lagoon	Hour Group Broadcasting, Inc.	Spanish Christian
WLVF-FM	90.3 FM	Haines City	Landmark Baptist Church, Inc.	Southern gospel
WLVJ	1020 AM	Boynton Beach	Actualidad Licensee 1020AM, LLC	Caribbean
WLYF	101.5 FM	Miami	Audacy License, LLC	Adult contemporary
WMBM	1490 AM	Miami Beach	New Birth Broadcasting Corp. Inc.	Urban gospel
WMBT-LP	90.1 FM	Gainesville	Come Together Productions, Inc.	Urban
WMBX	102.3 FM	Jensen Beach	WPB FCC License Sub, LLC	Rhythmic contemporary
WMCW-LP	97.7 FM	Astor	Astor Community Radio, Inc.	Variety
WMEN	640 AM	Royal Palm Beach	WPB FCC License Sub, LLC	Sports (FSR)
WMEZ	94.1 FM	Pensacola	Cumulus Licensing LLC	Rhythmic contemporary
WMFE-FM	90.7 FM	Orlando	Community Communications, Inc.	Public radio
WMFJ	1450 AM	Daytona Beach	Cornerstone Broadcasting Corporation	Christian Talk
WMFL	88.5 FM	Florida City	Call Communications	Unknown
WMFM	107.9 FM	Key West	South Broadcasting System, Inc.	Spanish hits
WMFQ	92.9 FM	Ocala	JVC Mergeco, LLC	Top 40 (CHR)
WMFV	89.5 FM	Cedar Creek	Community Communications, Inc.	News/Talk
WMGF	107.7 FM	Mount Dora	iHM Licenses, LLC	Adult contemporary
WMGG	1470 AM	Egypt Lake	DRC Broadcasting, Inc.	Spanish tropical
WMIA-FM	93.9 FM	Miami Beach	iHM Licenses, LLC	Bilingual adult contemporary
WMIB	103.5 FM	Fort Lauderdale	iHM Licenses, LLC	Urban contemporary
WMIE-FM	91.5 FM	Cocoa	National Christian Network, Inc.	Christian
WMKJ	88.1 FM	Tavernier	Call Communications Group, Inc.	Christian CHR
WMKL	91.9 FM	Hammocks	Radio Maria, Inc.	Christian CHR
WMKO	91.7 FM	Marco	Board of Trustees, Florida Gulf Coast University	Public radio
WMLO-LP	97.1 FM	Live Oak	Melody Christian Radio, Inc.	Religious
WMLV	89.7 FM	Miami	Educational Media Foundation	Contemporary Christian (K-Love)
WMMB	1240 AM	Melbourne	iHM Licenses, LLC	News/Talk
WMMO	98.9 FM	Orlando	Cox Radio, LLC	Classic hits
WMMV	1350 AM	Cocoa	iHM Licenses, LLC	News/Talk
WMNF	88.5 FM	Tampa	Nathan B. Stubblefield Foundation	Community radio
WMOF-LP	98.7 FM	Live Oak	Charles F. Martin Ministry, Inc.	Urban gospel
WMOP	900 AM	Ocala	Urban One Broadcasting Network, LLC	Sports (FSR)
WMQV-LP	102.3 FM	Kissimmee	Iglesia Cristiana Renuevo Inc.	Spanish Religious
WMSF-LP	97.1 FM	Mayo	Doonie and Deb Chevy, God's Miracle Chariot, Inc.	Urban Gospel
WMTB-LP	96.7 FM	St. Petersburg	96.7 FM RadioStPete, Inc.	Variety
WMTX	100.7 FM	Tampa	iHM Licenses, LLC	Adult contemporary
WMXJ	102.7 FM	Pompano Beach	Audacy License, LLC	Classic hits
WMXR-LP	92.7 FM	Miami	Vibe Community Radio, Inc.	R&B/Hip-Hop
WMYE	91.9 FM	Fort Myers	Call Communications Group, Inc.	Christian CHR
WMYM	990 AM	Kendall	Hispanos Communications LLC	Spanish Christian
WMYR	1410 AM	Fort Myers	Relevant Radio, Inc.	Catholic–talk radio
WMYZ	88.7 FM	The Villages	Central Florida Educational Foundation, Inc	Contemporary Christian
WNCV	93.3 FM	Shalimar	Cumulus Licensing LLC	Adult contemporary
WNDB	1150 AM	Daytona Beach	Black Crow Radio, LLC, Debtor-in-Possession	News/Talk/Sports (FSR)
WNDD	92.5 FM	Alachua	Saga South Communications, LLC	Classic rock
WNDO	1520 AM	Apopka	Orlando Radio Marketing, Inc.	Haitian Creole
WNEE-LP	107.5 FM	Tallahassee	Tallahassee Public Radio Inc.	Christian
WNFB	94.3 FM	Lake City	Newman Media, Inc.	Classic hits
WNGK-LP	102.1 FM	Fort Lauderdale	American Network Media Inc	Variety
WNKQ-LP	93.7 FM	Kissimmee	KQ Media Group	Tropical
WNMA	1210 AM	Miami Springs	Multicultural Radio Broadcasting Licensee, LLC	Spanish talk
WNNR	970 AM	Jacksonville	Norsan Consulting And Management, Inc.	Spanish classic tropical
WNRP	1620 AM	Gulf Breeze	ADX Communications of Escambia	News/talk
WNSS	89.3 FM	Palm Coast	Houston Christian Broadcasters, Inc.	Religious
WNTF	1580 AM	Bithlo	Unity Broadcasting LLC	Spanish
WNUE-FM	98.1 FM	Titusville	Radio Training Network, Inc.	Contemporary Christian
WNVY	1090 AM	Cantonment	Pensacola Radio Corporation	Christian
WNZF	1550 AM	Bunnell	Flagler County Broadcasting, LLC	News/Talk
WOCA	1370 AM	Ocala	Generations Broadcasting Corporation	News/Talk
WOCL	105.9 FM	DeLand	Audacy License, LLC	Classic hits
WOEX	96.5 FM	Orlando	Cox Radio, LLC	Bilingual AC
WOGJ-LP	99.9 FM	Orlando	Haitian Relief Radio and Community Services, Inc.	Haitian
WOGK	93.7 FM	Ocala	Saga South Communications, LLC	Country
WOIB-LP	101.9 FM	Oakland Park	The Omega Church International Ministry	Religious Teaching
WOIR	1430 AM	Homestead	ERJ Media LLC	Spanish
WOKB	1680 AM	Winter Garden	Unity Broadcasting LLC	Gospel
WOKC	1570 AM	Okeechobee	Glades Media Company LLC	Country
WOKE-LP	94.9 FM	Fort Myers	Radio Free Fort Myers, Inc.	Variety
WOKV	690 AM	Jacksonville	Cox Radio, LLC	Sports (ESPN)
WOKV-FM	104.5 FM	Atlantic Beach	Cox Radio, LLC	News/Talk
WOLL	105.5 FM	Hobe Sound	iHM Licenses, LLC	Adult contemporary
WOLR	91.3 FM	Lake City	Faith Radio Network, Inc.	Contemporary Christian
WOLZ	95.3 FM	Fort Myers	iHM Licenses, LLC	Classic hits
WOMX-FM	105.1 FM	Orlando	Audacy License, LLC	Hot adult contemporary
WONN	1230 AM	Lakeland	Hall Communications, Inc.	Adult hits
WONQ	1030 AM	Oviedo	Florida Broadcasters	Bilingual Hot AC
WOPC-LP	102.1 FM	Bradenton	Providence Presbyterian Church, OPC, Inc.	Religious Teaching
WORL	950 AM	Orlando	Caron Broadcasting, Inc.	Conservative talk
WOSN	97.1 FM	Indian River Shores	Vero Beach Broadcasters, LLC	Soft adult contemporary
WOTS	1220 AM	Kissimmee	J & V Communications, Inc.	Spanish
WOYS	106.5 FM	Carrabelle	East Bay Broadcasting, Inc.	Classic rock/Blues/Beach music
WPAP	92.5 FM	Panama City	iHM Licenses, LLC	Country
WKVZ	98.7 FM	Holmes Beach	K-Love Inc.	Contemporary Christian (K-Love)
WPBB	104.7 FM	Palm Beach Shores	South Florida Public Media Group, Inc.	Public radio
WPBE-LP	98.3 FM	West Palm Beach	Centro de Vida Inc	Spanish religious
WPBR	1340 AM	Lantana	Palm Beach Radio Group LLC	Talk
WPBV-LP	98.3 FM	Palm Beach	Coastal Frequencies Inc.	Catholic
WPBW-LP	102.1 FM	St. Petersburg	Peace Be With You Media, Inc.	Catholic
WPCF	1290 AM	Panama City Beach	Faith Radio Network, Inc.	Silent
WPCS	89.5 FM	Pensacola	Pensacola Christian College, Inc.	Christian
WPCV	97.5 FM	Winter Haven	Hall Communications, Inc.	Country
WPFL	105.1 FM	Century	Tri-County Broadcasting, Inc.	Classic country
WPFM	107.9 FM	Panama City	Educational Media Foundation	Contemporary Christian (K-Love)
WPGS	840 AM	Mims	WPGS, Inc.	Talk
WPGT	90.1 FM	Lake City	Grace Church of Lake City Inc.	Religious
WPHC-LP	107.9 FM	Spring Hill	Nature Coast Community Radio	Variety
WPHK	102.7 FM	Blountstown	La Promesa Foundation	Catholic
WPHR-FM	94.7 FM	Gifford	R&S Radio LLC	Country
WPHX-LP	101.9 FM	Ruskin	Firehouse Cultural Center Inc.	Variety
WPIK	102.5 FM	Summerland Key	Magnum Broadcasting, Inc.	Conservative talk
WPIO	89.3 FM	Titusville	Florida Public Radio, Inc.	Christian
WPJM-LP	101.1 FM	Palatka	Minority Educational Broadcasting, Inc.	Religious Teaching
WPKA-LP	99.9 FM	Apopka	VJIL Inc.	Regional Mexican
WPLA	107.3 FM	Green Cove Springs	iHM Licenses, LLC	Active rock
WPLK	800 AM	Palatka	Natkim Radio, LLC	Soft oldies
WPLL	106.9 FM	Cross City	Marc Radio Gainesville, LLC	Classic country
WPLV	95.7 FM	Navarre	Educational Media Foundation	Contemporary Christian (K-Love)
WPNN	790 AM	Pensacola	Miracle Radio, Inc.	News/Talk
WPNS	1140 AM	Destin	Andala Enterprises, Inc.	Silent
WPOM	1600 AM	Riviera Beach	Caribbean Media Group, Inc.	Ethnic
WPOW	96.5 FM	Miami	Audacy License, LLC	Classic hip hop
WPOZ	88.3 FM	Orlando	Central Florida Educational Foundation, Inc.	Contemporary Christian
WPRD	1440 AM	Winter Park	J & V Communications, Inc.	Spanish
WPRK	91.5 FM	Winter Park	Rollins College	College
WPRY	1400 AM	Perry	Dockins Communications, Inc.	Silent
WPSF	91.5 FM	Clewiston	Call Communications Group, Inc.	Christian CHR
WPSI-LP	98.7 FM	Miami	Radio Voz Mundial Inc	Haitian
WPSL	1590 AM	Port St. Lucie	Port St. Lucie Broadcasters, Inc.	Talk
WPSM	91.1 FM	Fort Walton Beach	Destiny Worship Center Inc.	Contemporary worship music
WPSO	1500 AM	New Port Richey	Akma Broadcast Network, Inc.	Ethnic/Greek
WPSP	1190 AM	Royal Palm Beach	George M. Arroyo	Spanish
WPYO	95.3 FM	Maitland	WPYO Licensing, Inc.	Spanish Top 40 (CHR)
WPZM-LP	107.5 FM	Gainesville	Community Praise Center	Black gospel
WQAM	560 AM	Miami	Audacy License, LLC	Sports (ISN/BetMGM)
WQAM-FM	104.3 FM	Miramar	Audacy License, LLC	Sports (ISN/BetMGM)
WQBA	1140 AM	Miami	Latino Media Group, LLC	Spanish talk/sports
WQBN	1300 AM	Temple Terrace	Crisbeto Enterprises Corp.	Spanish
WQBQ	1410 AM	Leesburg	Floyd Media Radio, Inc.	News/Talk
WQCP	88.5 FM	Clewiston	Indian River State College	Classical
WQCS	88.9 FM	Fort Pierce	Indian River State College	NPR News/Talk
WQFB-LP	97.3 FM	Flagler Beach	Save the Surf, Inc.	Classic hits/Variety
WQHL	1250 AM	Live Oak	RTG Radio, LLC, Debtor-in-Possession	Classic hits
WQHL-FM	98.1 FM	Live Oak	RTG Radio, LLC, Debtor-in-Possession	Country
WQIK-FM	99.1 FM	Jacksonville	iHM Licenses, LLC	Country
WQLC	102.1 FM	Watertown	Dockins Broadcast Group, LLC	Country
WQNB-LP	100.3 FM	Miami	Beware Inc.	Urban
WQOL	103.7 FM	Vero Beach	iHM Licenses, LLC	Classic hits
WQOP	1460 AM	Jacksonville	Relevant Radio, Inc.	Catholic
WQOS	1080 AM	Coral Gables	Relevant Radio, Inc.	Catholic
WQPN-LP	94.3 FM	Miami	Multimedia America Inc	Rap/Hip-Hop
WQTA-LP	106.9 FM	Tampa	North Tampa Community Radio	Adult contemporary/Adult album alternative/College
WQTL	106.1 FM	Tallahassee	ARG of Tallahassee LLC	Rhythmic Hot AC
WQVN	1360 AM	North Miami	Radio Piment Bouk	Haitian
WQXM	1460 AM	Bartow	DRC Broadcasting, Inc.	Spanish language, Contemporary Hits
WQXY-LP	99.7 FM	Fort Myers	Premiere International Cares, Inc.	Easy listening
WQYK-FM	99.5 FM	St. Petersburg	Beasley Media Group Licenses, LLC	Country
WRAZ-FM	106.3 FM	Leisure City	South Broadcasting System, Inc.	Salsa music
WRBA	95.9 FM	Springfield	RoRo Investments, LLC	Christian AC
WRBD	1230 AM	Gainesville	Urban One Broadcasting Network, LLC	Urban contemporary
WRBQ-FM	104.7 FM	Tampa	Beasley Media Group Licenses, LLC	Classic hits
WRDJ-LP	93.5 FM	Merritt Island	Calvary Chapel of Merritt Island, Inc.	Religious
WRGE-LP	97.9 FM	Ocala	Life Legacy Ocala, Inc.	Christian
WRGP	88.1 FM	Homestead	Florida International University Board of Trustees	Variety
WRGV	107.3 FM	Pensacola	iHM Licenses, LLC	Urban contemporary
WRHC	1550 AM	Coral Gables	Hispanic Communications, LLC	Spanish talk
WRIZ-LP	101.1 FM	Boca Raton	All Media Services of America Inc	Rap/Hip-Hop
WRLE-LP	94.9 FM	Dunnellon	Power Ministries	Urban contemporary
WRLX	94.3 FM	Riviera Beach	iHM Licenses, LLC	Spanish adult contemporary
WRLZ	1160 AM	St. Cloud	Radio Luz, Inc.	Spanish Christian
WRMA	95.7 FM	North Miami Beach	WXDJ Licensing, Inc.	Cubatón
WRMB	89.3 FM	Boynton Beach	The Moody Bible Institute of Chicago	Religious
WRMF	97.9 FM	Palm Beach	WPB FCC License Sub, LLC	Hot AC
WRNE	980 AM	Gulf Breeze	Media One Communications, Inc.	Urban contemporary
WROD	1340 AM	Daytona Beach	Miracle Media Group, LLC	Active rock
WROK-FM	95.9 FM	Sebastian	Cumulus Licensing LLC	Classic rock
WROS	1050 AM	Jacksonville	WROS, The Rose of Jacksonville, LLC	Religious
WRPE-LP	98.5 FM	Jacksonville	Amor y Misericordia la Estacion	Spanish religious
WRRJ	89.7 FM	Cocoa Beach	Black Media Works, Inc.	Reggae/Island music
WRRQ-LP	96.9 FM	Cocoa	Living Free in Christ Church, Inc.	Religious Teaching
WRRX	106.1 FM	Gulf Breeze	Cumulus Licensing LLC	Urban contemporary
WRSO	810 AM	Orlovista	Star Over Orlando, Inc.	Sports (FSR)
WRTO-FM	98.3 FM	Goulds	Univision Radio Illinois, Inc.	Spanish Tropical
WDAE-FM	95.7 FM	Clearwater	iHM Licenses, LLC	Sports
WRUF	850 AM	Gainesville	University of Florida	Sports (ESPN)
WRUF-FM	103.7 FM	Gainesville	The University of Florida	Country
WRUM	100.3 FM	Orlando	iHM Licenses, LLC	Spanish Tropical
WRWS-LP	99.1 FM	Daytona Beach	Bethune-Cookman College, Inc.	Urban
WRXK-FM	96.1 FM	Bonita Springs	Beasley Media Group, LLC	Mainstream rock
WRXW-LP	92.7 FM	Winter Park	92.7 FM WRXW Inc	Soft adult contemporary
WRZN	720 AM	Hernando	Marc Radio Gainesville, LLC	Talk
WSBB	1230 AM	New Smyrna Beach	Diegel Communications, LLC	Adult standards
WSBH	98.5 FM	Satellite Beach	MARC Radio Orlando, LLC	Oldies
WSBZ	106.3 FM	Miramar Beach	Carter Broadcasting, Inc.	Smooth jazz
WSCF-FM	91.9 FM	Vero Beach	Treasure Coast Educational Media, Inc.	Contemporary Christian
WSCQ-LP	96.3 FM	Sun City Center	Sun City Center Radio, Inc.	Classic hits
WSDO	1400 AM	Sanford	J & V Communications, Inc.	Spanish
WSDV	1450 AM	Sarasota	iHM Licenses, LLC	Hot adult contemporary
WSDX-LP	101.9 FM	Brandon	Brandon Community Broadcasting Inc	Christian
WSEB	91.3 FM	Englewood	Suncoast Educational Broadcasting Corp.	Christian
WSEU-LP	93.7 FM	Lakeland	Southeastern University, Inc.	Contemporary Christian
WSGD-LP	95.7 FM	Lehigh Acres	Sumarrase, Inc.	R&B/Reggae
WSGL	104.7 FM	Naples	Renda Broadcasting Corporation of Nevada	Hot adult contemporary
WSIR	1490 AM	Winter Haven	Walco Enterprises LLC	Spanish
WSKR-LP	95.5 FM	Jacksonville	University of North Florida Board of Trustees	Variety
WSKY-FM	97.3 FM	Micanopy	Audacy License, LLC	News/Talk
WSLR-LP	96.5 FM	Sarasota	New College Student Alliance	Talk
WSMR	89.1 FM	Sarasota	University of South Florida Board of Trustees	Classical
WSOL-FM	101.5 FM	Yulee	iHM Licenses, LLC	Urban adult contemporary
WSOR	90.9 FM	Naples	The Moody Bible Institute of Chicago	Contemporary Christian
WSOS	1170 AM	St. Augustine Beach	WSOS Radio LLC	Classic hits
WSOS-FM	94.1 FM	Fruit Cove	Norsan Media LLC	Spanish tropical
WSQF-LP	94.5 FM	Key Biscayne	Square Foot Community Radio Corp.	Variety
WSRF	1580 AM	Fort Lauderdale	Niche Radio, Inc.	Caribbean
WSRQ	1220 AM	Sarasota	Lake Erie College of Osteopathic Medicine, Inc.	Classic hits/Oldies
WSRQ-FM	106.9 FM	Zolfo Springs	Lake Erie College of Osteopathic Medicine, Inc.	Classic hits/Oldies
WSRZ-FM	107.9 FM	Coral Cove	iHM Licenses, LLC	Classic hits
WSSJ-LP	92.3 FM	White Springs	White Springs Public Radio, Inc.	Variety
WSTU	1450 AM	Stuart	Treasure Coast Broadcasters, Inc.	News/Talk
WSUA	1260 AM	Miami	WSUA Broadcasting Corporation	Spanish
WSUN	97.1 FM	Holiday	WSUN Licensing, Inc.	Spanish Tropical
WSVB-LP	95.1 FM	Chiefland	Trinity Baptist Church	Religious
WSVJ-LP	93.7 FM	Titusville	Greater Blessed Assurance Apostolic Temple, Inc.	Religious Teaching
WSVU	960 AM	North Palm Beach	United Group Elite Agency Investment LLC	Haitian Creole
WSWN	900 AM	Belle Glade	Sugar Broadcasting, Inc.	Talk
WTAL	1450 AM	Tallahassee	Live Communications, Inc.	News/Talk
WTAN	1340 AM	Clearwater	Radio World Inc.	Talk
WTBH	91.5 FM	Chiefland	Long Pond Baptist Church	Religious
WTBN	570 AM	Pinellas Park	Caron Broadcasting, Inc.	Religious
WTBV	101.5 FM	St. Petersburg	Cox Radio, LLC	Urban adult contemporary
WTEC-LP	101.1 FM	Sarasota	School District of Manatee County, FL	Spanish
WTGF	90.5 FM	Milton	Faith Bible College, Inc.	Southern gospel
WTID	101.7 FM	Graceville	Radio Training Network, Inc.	Contemporary Christian
WTIR	91.9 FM	Brighton Reservation	Seminole Tribe of Florida	Classic country
WTIS	1110 AM	Tampa	Q-Broadcasting Corporation, Inc.	Religious
WTJT	90.1 FM	Baker	Florala Radio Group	Christian
WTJV	1490 AM	DeLand	J & V Communications, Inc.	Adult standards
WTKE	1490 AM	Milton	T O V Group Inc.	Sports (FSR)
WTKE-FM	100.3 FM	Niceville	Omni Broadcasting, LLC	Classic rock
WTKS-FM	104.1 FM	Cocoa Beach	iHM Licenses, LLC	Talk
WTKX-FM	101.5 FM	Pensacola	iHM Licenses, LLC	Active rock
WTLN	990 AM	Orlando	Caron Broadcasting, Inc.	Christian talk
WTLQ-FM	97.7 FM	Punta Rassa	Fort Myers Broadcasting Company	Spanish CHR
WTLY	1270 AM	Tallahassee	iHM Licenses, LLC	Sports (FSR)
WTMG	101.3 FM	Williston	Marc Radio Gainesville, LLC	Silent
WTMN	1430 AM	Gainesville	Marc Radio Gainesville, LLC	Gospel
WTMP	1150 AM	Egypt Lake	NIA Broadcasting, Inc.	Sports (ESPN)
WTMP-FM	96.1 FM	Dade City	NIA Broadcasting, Inc.	Regional Mexican
WTMS-LP	105.5 FM	Kissimmee	Tvmision Corporation	Spanish religious
WTMY	1280 AM	Sarasota	Solmart Media, LLC	Regional Mexican
WTNT-FM	94.9 FM	Tallahassee	iHM Licenses, LLC	Country
WTPA	980 AM	Pompano Beach	HMDF, LLC	Haitian Creole
WTRJ-FM	91.7 FM	Orange Park	Delmarva Educational Association	Contemporary Christian
WTSM	97.9 FM	Woodville	Radio Training Network, Inc.	Contemporary Christian
WTTB	1490 AM	Vero Beach	Vero Beach Broadcasters, LLC	News/Talk
WTWB	1570 AM	Auburndale	La Raza Media Group, LLC	Talk
WTWD	910 AM	Plant City	Salem Communications Holding Corporation	Religious
WTYG	91.5 FM	Sparr	Central Baptist Church of Ocala Inc.	Religious
WTYS	1340 AM	Marianna	James L. Adams, Jr.	Country
WTYS-FM	94.1 FM	Marianna	James L. Adams, Jr.	Gospel
WTYX-LP	97.1 FM	Titusville	Pathway Public Radio, Inc.	Religious Teaching
WTZB	105.9 FM	Englewood	iHM Licenses, LLC	Mainstream rock
WUAF-LP	107.9 FM	Lake City	Angel Ministries of Lake City Inc.	Gospel
WUBA	88.1 FM	High Springs	Neighborhoods United for a Better Alachua, Inc.	Variety
WUBP-LP	100.1 FM	St. Petersburg	All African People's Development and Empowerment Project	Variety
WUCF-FM	89.9 FM	Orlando	University of Central Florida	Jazz
WUCR-LP	107.9 FM	Lake Butler	Synewave Communications, Inc	Variety
WUFQ	88.5 FM	Cross City	University of Florida Board of Trustees	Contemporary Christian
WUFR-LP	102.7 FM	Umatilla	Communication Arts Center, Inc.	Classic country
WUFT-FM	89.1 FM	Gainesville	Board of Trustees, University of Florida	Public radio
WUGR-LP	103.1 FM	Miaramar	Miami Multi-Media Association Corp	Variety
WUJC	91.1 FM	St. Marks	CSN International	Religious (CSN International)
WUJM-LP	99.1 FM	St. Petersburg	Caribbean Festival Association (Carifesta), Inc.	Reggae
WULB-LP	96.3 FM	Long Boat Key	M & M Community Development Inc., Longboat Key Branch	Classic hits
WUNA	1480 AM	Ocoee	J & V Communications Inc.	Spanish
WUOH-LP	100.7 FM	Orlando	Voz Latina Broadcasting Inc.	Spanish adult contemporary
WURB-LP	92.7 FM	Kissimmee	New Voice of Central Florida, Inc	Spanish Christian
WURK-LP	96.3 FM	Tampa	Rainbow Heights Neighborhood Association and Crime Watch, Inc	R&B/Variety
WURN	1040 AM	Miami	Actualidad 1040AM Licensee, LLC	Spanish News/Talk
WURN-FM	107.1 FM	Key Largo	Actualidad Key Largo FM Licensee, LLC	Spanish CHR
WUSF	89.7 FM	Tampa	University of South Florida	News/Jazz
WUWF	88.1 FM	Pensacola	The University of West Florida	Variety
WVDV-LP	104.9 FM	Sebring	Highlands County Community Broadcasting, Inc.	Spanish
WVET-LP	92.1 FM	Fort McCoy	Eureka Community Education Services, Inc.	Oldies
WVFP-LP	94.7 FM	Gainesville	Faith Presbyterian Church of Gainesville, Inc.	Religious
WVFS	89.7 FM	Tallahassee	Florida State University	Alternative
WVFT	93.3 FM	Gretna	Magic Broadcasting II, LLC	Talk
WVGK-LP	94.5 FM	Miami	Llamados Para Triunfar Inc	Spanish Religious
WVGT-LP	97.1 FM	Mount Dora	Seminole County Community Broadcasters, Inc.	Oldies
WVIJ	91.7 FM	Port Charlotte	Lake Erie College of Osteopathic Medicine, Inc.	Oldies (WSRQ)
WVLG	640 AM	Wildwood	Villages Communications, Inc.	Classic hits
WVLQ	101.9 FM	Port St. Joe	Gold Standard Broadcasting Inc	Religious
WVOI	91.5 FM	Everglades City	Newland Broadcasters Incorporated	
WVOJ	1570 AM	Fernandina Beach	Norsan Consulting And Management, Inc.	Regional Mexican
WVRO-LP	105.3 FM	Vero Beach	Flowing Streams Church	Contemporary Christian
WVTJ	610 AM	Pensacola	Pensacola Radio Corporation	Gospel
WVUM	90.5 FM	Coral Gables	WVUM, Inc.	Variety
WVVD-LP	99.1 FM	Seffner	Iglesia Cristiana La Nueva Jerusalem Inc.	Spanish/Catholic
WVVF-LP	100.1 FM	Town N' Country	Hispanic Arts of Tampa	Spanish
WVVO	1140 AM	Orlando	Florida Broadcasters	Spanish urban
WVXE-LP	95.5 FM	Orange Park	Calvary Chapel of Orange Park, Inc.	Religious Teaching
WVYB	103.3 FM	Holly Hill	Black Crow Media, LLC, Debtor-in-Possession	Top 40 (CHR)
WWAB	1330 AM	Lakeland	Walco Enterprises, LLC	Urban contemporary
WWAV	102.1 FM	Santa Rosa Beach	JVC Mergeco, LLC	Adult hits
WWBA	820 AM	Largo	Genesis Communications of Tampa Bay, Inc.	Talk/Sports (CBS)
WWBC	1510 AM	Cocoa	Astro Enterprises, Inc.	News/Talk
WWBF	1130 AM	Bartow	Thornburg Communications, Inc.	Classic hits
WWCD	1070 AM	Solana	iHM Licenses, LLC	Sports (FSR)
WWCL	1440 AM	Lehigh Acres	Radio Vision Cristiana Management	Talk
WWCN	99.3 FM	Fort Myers Beach	Beasley Media Group, LLC	Contemporary Christian
WWCQ	107.9 FM	Chiefland	Suncoast Radio	Classic rock
WWDH-LP	93.3 FM	Fort Myers	WWDH-LPFM, Inc.	Variety
WWEO-LP	103.9 FM	DeFuniak Springs	Emanuel Communications	Religious
WWFE	670 AM	Miami	Hispanos Communications, LLC	Spanish talk
WWFH-LP	102.1 FM	Land O' Lakes	Mason Dixon Christmas Wish Fund, Inc.	Christian Contemporary
WWFL	1340 AM	Clermont	Onda Mexicana Radio Group, Inc.	Regional Mexican
WWFR	91.7 FM	Stuart	Family Stations, Inc.	Religious (Family Radio)
WWGR	101.9 FM	Fort Myers	Renda Broadcasting Corporation of Nevada	Country
WWID-LP	96.1 FM	Orlando	La Mision, Inc.	Spanish Contemporary Christian
WWJB	1450 AM	Brooksville	Hernando Broadcasting Company, Inc.	Country
WWJJ	91.7 FM	Jasper	Florida Educational Radio, Inc.	Oldies
WWKA	92.3 FM	Orlando	Cox Radio, LLC	Country
WWLL	105.7 FM	Sebring	Cohan Radio Group, Inc.	Adult contemporary
WWLY	100.1 FM	Panama City Beach	Magic Broadcasting II, LLC	Classic country
WWMA-LP	107.9 FM	Avon Park	Highlands County Chapter of Asi, Inc.	Religious
WWMI	1380 AM	St. Petersburg	Relevant Radio, Inc.	Catholic
WWNN	1470 AM	Pompano Beach	Vic Canales Media Group, LLC	Christian radio
WWNP-LP	97.5 FM	North Port	Community Broadband Radio Association, Inc.	Variety
WWOF	103.1 FM	Tallahassee	ARG of Tallahassee LLC	Country
WWOJ	99.1 FM	Avon Park	Cohan Radio Group, Inc.	Country
WWPP-LP	97.7 FM	Homestead	We Count	Variety
WWPR	1490 AM	Bradenton	Vidify Media, Inc.	Talk
WWRF	1380 AM	Lake Worth	Radio Fiesta, Inc.	Mainstream rock
WWRG-LP	99.7 FM	Lake Mary	Youth Broadcasting in Radio	Soft AC/Adult standards
WWRM	94.9 FM	Tampa	Cox Radio, LLC	Adult contemporary
WWRZ	98.3 FM	Fort Meade	Hall Communications, Inc.	Contemporary Christian
WWSH-LP	97.7 FM	Vero Beach	Calvary Chapel of Vero Beach, Inc.	Religious Teaching
WWTK	730 AM	Lake Placid	Cohan Radio Group, Inc.	News/Talk
WWUS	104.1 FM	Big Pine Key	Florida Keys Media, LLC	Classic hits
WWWK	105.5 FM	Islamorada	Universal Broadcasting Network LLC	Spanish/Oldies
WWWO-LP	96.9 FM	Miami	Power One Ministries, Inc.	Spanish Contemporary Christian
WWZT-LP	105.1 FM	Tampa	Latino Heritage Organization, Inc.	Contemporary Christian
WXBM-FM	102.7 FM	Milton	Cumulus Licensing LLC	Country
WXBN	880 AM	Sweetwater	iHM Licenses, LLC	Black-oriented news
WXCV	95.3 FM	Homosassa Springs	WGUL-FM, Inc.	Hot adult contemporary
WXCZ	103.3 FM	Cedar Key	WGUL-FM, Inc.	Country
WXDJ	106.7 FM	Fort Lauderdale	WRMA Licensing, Inc.	Spanish Tropical
WXEI-LP	95.3 FM	Crestview	X-Static Enterprises Inc.	Talk
WXGL	107.3 FM	St. Petersburg	Cox Radio, LLC	Classic hits
WXHT	102.7 FM	Madison	RTG Radio, LLC, Debtor-in-Possession	Top 40 (CHR)
WXIO-LP	102.7 FM	Ridge Manor	Anchor of our Soul Ministries, Inc.	Contemporary Christian
WXJB	99.9 FM	Homosassa	George S. Flinn, Jr.	Talk
WXJZ	100.9 FM	Gainesville	Marc Radio Gainesville, LLC	Classic hits
WXKB	103.9 FM	Cape Coral	Beasley Media Group, LLC	Top 40 (CHR)
WXKW	104.9 FM	Key West	Sunny Days Radio, LLC	Adult hits
WXOF	96.7 FM	Yankeetown	WGUL-FM, Inc	Classic hits
WXRA	99.3 FM	Inglis	Educational Media Foundation	Worship music (Air 1)
WXSR	101.5 FM	Quincy	iHM Licenses, LLC	Active rock
WXTB	97.9 FM	Clearwater	iHM Licenses, LLC	Active rock
WXTY	99.9 FM	Lafayette	ARG of Tallahassee LLC	Adult hits
WXUS	102.3 FM	Dunnellon	JVC Mergeco, LLC	Country/Rock
WXXL	106.7 FM	Tavares	iHM Licenses, LLC	Top 40 (CHR)
WXYB	1520 AM	Indian Rocks Beach	Asa Broadcasting, Inc	Ethnic/Greek & Spanish
WXZC	104.3 FM	Inglis	WGUL-FM, Inc.	Country
WYBP	90.3 FM	Fort Lauderdale	Bible Broadcasting Network, Inc.	Conservative religious (Bible Broadcasting Network)
WYBT	1000 AM	Blountstown	La Promesa Foundation	Oldies
WYBW	88.7 FM	Key Colony Beach	Bible Broadcasting Network, Inc.	Conservative religious (Bible Broadcasting Network)
WYBX	88.3 FM	Key West	Bible Broadcasting Network, Inc.	Conservative religious (Bible Broadcasting Network)
WYCT	98.7 FM	Pensacola	Mary Elizabeth Hoxeng Revocable Trust	Country
WYDD-LP	107.5 FM	Youngstown	Bear Creek Feline Center, Inc.	Country/Rock
WYFB	90.5 FM	Gainesville	Bible Broadcasting Network, Inc.	Conservative religious (Bible Broadcasting Network)
WYFE	88.9 FM	Tarpon Springs	Bible Broadcasting Network, Inc.	Conservative religious (Bible Broadcasting Network)
WYFO	91.9 FM	Lakeland	Bible Broadcasting Network, Inc.	Conservative religious (Bible Broadcasting Network)
WYFZ	91.3 FM	Belleview	Bible Broadcasting Network, Inc.	Conservative religious (Bible Broadcasting Network)
WYGC	104.9 FM	High Springs	JVC Mergeco, LLC	Hot talk
WYGM	740 AM	Orlando	iHM Licenses, LLC	Sports (FSR/ESPN)
WYHJ-LP	107.9 FM	Gulf Breeze	Calvary Chapel Gulf Breeze d/b/a Coastline Calvary Chapel	Christian
WYJC	90.3 FM	Greenville	CSN International	Christian rock (Effect Radio)
WYKB	105.3 FM	Fernandina Beach	Norman Media, LLC	Spanish rhythmic
WYKS	105.3 FM	Gainesville	Gillen Broadcasting Corporation	Top 40 (CHR)
WYMM	1530 AM	Jacksonville	AVM Broadcasting LLC	Haitian
WYND	1310 AM	DeLand	Proclaim Media Group LLC	Christian
WYND-FM	95.5 FM	Silver Springs	Saga South Communications, LLC	Classic rock
WYOO	101.1 FM	Springfield	Magic Broadcasting II, LLC	Talk
WYPW-LP	90.1 FM	Brandon	New Media Humanity Association, Inc.	Top 40 (CHR)
WYUN-LP	104.7 FM	Coconut Creek	Uno Mision, Inc.	Spanish religious
WYUU	92.5 FM	Safety Harbor	Beasley Media Group Licenses, LLC	Rhythmic Latin
WYYX	97.7 FM	Bonifay	Magic Broadcasting II, LLC	Active rock
WYZB	105.5 FM	Mary Esther	Cumulus Licensing LLC	Country
WZAY-LP	92.9 FM	Rockledge	Rockledge Church of Christ	Religious Teaching
WZAZ	1400 AM	Jacksonville	Titus Harvest Dome Spectrum Church, Inc.	Gospel
WZCC	1240 AM	Cross City	Suncoast Radio, Inc.	Classic country
WZDF-LP	103.3 FM	Merritt Island	East Coast Christian Center Inc.	Religious Teaching
WZEP	1460 AM	DeFuniak Springs	Fleetwood Communications, Inc.	Variety
WZEU-LP	102.9 FM	Weeki Wachee	Weeki Wachee Community Radio Inc	Hot Adult Contemporary
WZFL	93.5 FM	Islamorada	Zoo Communications, LLC	Dance
WZFR	104.5 FM	Eastpoint	Faith Radio Network, Inc.	Religious
WZHR	1400 AM	Zephyrhills	Walco Enterprises, Inc.	Talk
WZIG-LP	104.1 FM	Palm Harbor	Palm Harbor Radio Inc.	Extreme variety
WZJZ	100.1 FM	Port Charlotte	iHM Licenses, LLC	Latin pop/Adult contemporary
WZKO	1350 AM	Fort Myers	Genesis Multimedia Group, LLC	Religious
WZLB	103.1 FM	Valparaiso	JVC Mergeco, LLC	Talk
WZNS	96.5 FM	Fort Walton Beach	Cumulus Licensing LLC	Top 40 (CHR)
WZNZ	1600 AM	Atlantic Beach	Relevant Radio, Inc.	Catholic
WZOP-LP	92.7 FM	Fort Lauderdale	Hollywood Brothers Helping Others, Inc.	Caribbean
WZPH-LP	96.7 FM	Dade City	Pasco County Educational Corporation	Contemporary Christian
WZPP-LP	96.1 FM	Hollywood	Broward Jewish Alliance, Inc.	Caribbean
WZRE-LP	99.3 FM	Perry	Big Bend Heritage Music Association, Inc.	Variety
WZSP	105.3 FM	Nocatee	Solmart Media, LLC	Regional Mexican
WZTA	1370 AM	Vero Beach	iHM Licenses, LLC	Conservative talk
WZTU	94.9 FM	Miami Beach	iHM Licenses, LLC	Spanish CHR
WZZR	92.1 FM	West Palm Beach	iHM Licenses, LLC	Talk

== Defunct ==
- WAGE
- WAJP
- WAXA
- WBFT-LP
- WCFI
- WCFQ-LP
- WCNU
- WDDV
- WDSP
- WEAG
- WEKJ-LP
- WFAB
- WFBO-LP
- WFDM
- WFHA-LP
- WFJV-LP
- WFLA (Boca Raton, Florida)
- WFLP-LP
- WFLU-LP
- WFSH
- WFSX
- WFTI-FM
- WGAG-FM
- WGOT-LP
- WGRO
- WGRV-LP
- WHBT
- WHTR-LP
- WINV
- WIRA
- WKGC
- WKIZ
- WKJO-LP
- WLAS-LP
- WLMS
- WLVF (AM)
- WLZR
- WMAF
- WMJX
- WNOG
- WNPL
- WNRG-LP
- WORZ-LP
- WPCU-LP
- WPLP
- WPRY-FM
- WRAP
- WREH
- WSBR
- WSUN
- WSVE
- WTHA-LP
- WTKP
- WTOT
- WVFP-LP
- WVOI
- WVST
- WWSD
- WYFR
- WZQR-LP
- WZRO-LP

== See also ==
- WRMI, a shortwave radio station that broadcasts from Okeechobee, Florida
- Florida media
  - List of newspapers in Florida
  - List of television stations in Florida
  - Media of cities in Florida: Fort Lauderdale, Gainesville, Jacksonville, Key West, Lakeland, Miami, Orlando, St. Petersburg, Tallahassee, Tampa

== Bibliography ==
- Jack Alicoate, ed. (1939), "Florida", Radio Annual, New York: Radio Daily, OCLC 2459636 – via Internet Archive
- Chas. A. Alicoate, ed. (1957), "Amplitude Modulation Stations - AM: Florida", Radio Annual and Television Yearbook, New York: Radio Daily Corp., OCLC 10512206 – via Internet Archive
- "United States AM Stations: Florida", Yearbook of Radio and Television, New York: Radio Television Daily, 1964, OCLC 7469377 – via Internet Archive + FM Stations on the Air: Florida

== Images ==
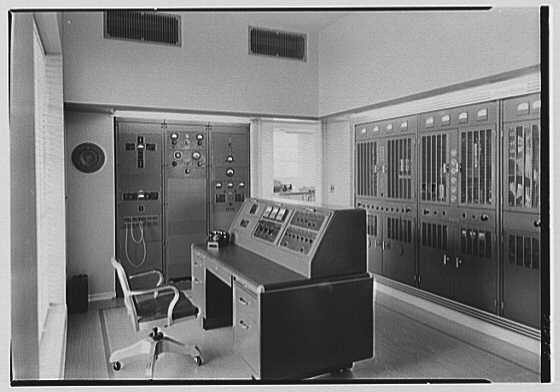
WIOD radio transmitter building, Miami Beach, Florida, 1941

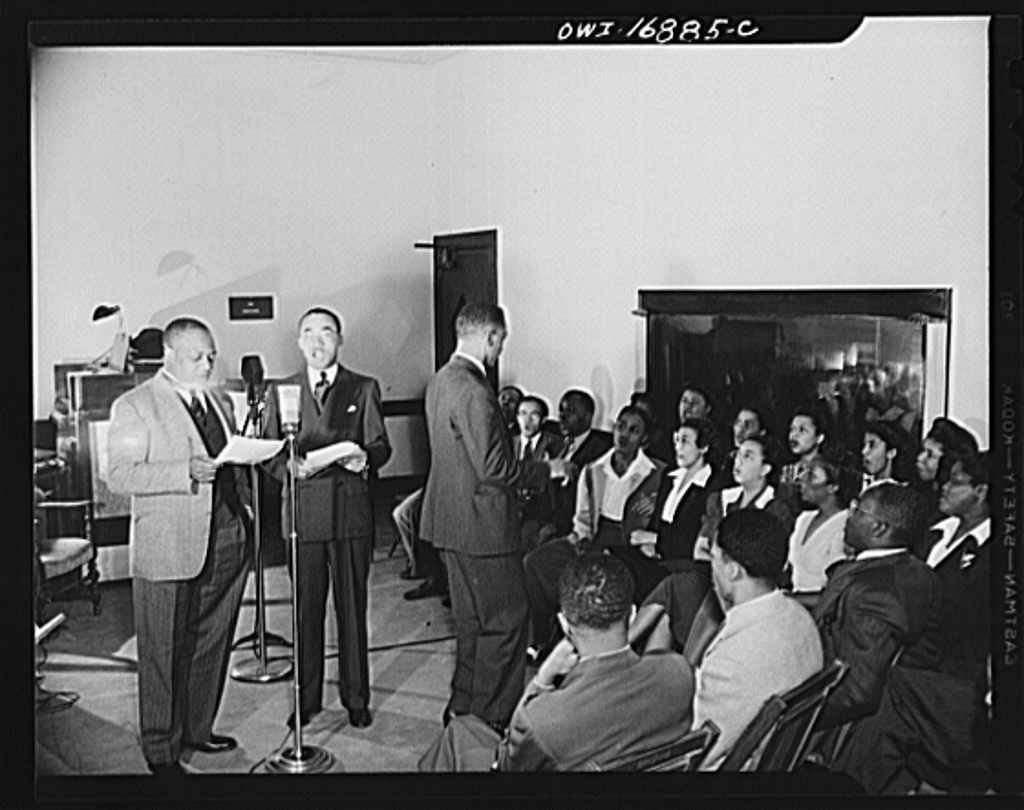
WDBO radio in Orlando, Florida, 1943
