= WPRY =

WPRY may refer to:

- WPRY (AM), a radio station (1400 AM) licensed to serve Perry, Florida, United States
- WPRY-FM, a radio station (92.1 FM) licensed to serve Perry, Florida
