= WTYS =

WTYS may refer to:

- WTYS (AM), a radio station (1340 AM) licensed to Marianna, Florida, United States
- WTYS-FM, a radio station (94.1 FM) licensed to Marianna, Florida, United States
