= WFSH =

WFSH may refer to:

- WAIA (FM), a radio station (104.7 FM) licensed to Athens, Georgia, United States, which used the call sign WFSH-FM from 2000 to 2025.
- WFSH (AM), a former radio station (1340 AM) licensed to Valparaiso-Niceville, Florida, United States.
- WFSH-FM, a radio station (105.1 FM) licensed to Sheffield, Pennsylvania, United States.
