= WCEE =

WCEE may refer to:

- WCEE-LD, a low-power television station (channel 17, virtual 16) licensed to serve Charlotte, North Carolina, United States
- WPXS, formerly known as WCEE, an affiliate of RTV serving the St. Louis designated market area
- WIFR, formerly known as WCEE, a CBS television affiliate based in Rockford, Illinois and licensed to nearby Freeport
- WGRV-LP, formerly known as WCEE-LP, a smooth jazz radio station in Melbourne, Florida
