= WGOT-LP =

Radio station in Gainesville, Florida, United States

- Gainesville, Florida; United States
- Frequency: 100.1 MHz

Programming
- Format: Community Radio
- Affiliations: Pacifica Radio

Ownership
- Owner: Civic Media Center and Library, Inc.

History
- First air date: January 7, 2008
- Former frequencies: 94.7 MHz (2008–2017)

Technical information
- Licensing authority: FCC
- Facility ID: 133958
- Class: L1
- ERP: 12 watts
- HAAT: 60 meters
- Transmitter coordinates: 29°41′12″N 82°26′48″W

Links
- Public license information: LMS
- Webcast: Tower.wgot.org:2201
- Website: http://www.wgot.org/

WGOT-LP (100.1 FM) is a low power FM radio station that broadcasts from Gainesville, Florida, United States. WGOT-LP is operated as a community radio station by the Civic Media Center, a non-profit library in Gainesville. WGOT airs progressive talk from 5-10 am and Noon-3 including Thom Hartmann and Democracy Now twice daily. Music shows, ranging from bluegrass to drum and bass, play all other times.

== History ==
The Civic Media Center first applied for a permit for a low-power FM station in 2001. The construction permit for WGOT-LP was granted in May 2005.

WGOT-LP originally broadcast on 94.7 MHz, sharing this frequency with WVFP-LP, owned by the Faith Presbyterian Church, and WGLJ-LP, owned by the Calvary Church Gainesville. The frequency was previously used by Free Radio Gainesville, a pirate radio station.

In January 2012, the station began streaming its audio online. Streaming was terminated due to copyright issues in October 2015.

== Frequency change ==
On February 28, 2017, the station moved to 100.1 MHz to facilitate 24-hour operation.

The Civic Media Center and Library surrendered WGOT-LP's license to the Federal Communications Commission (FCC) on October 10, 2023; the FCC cancelled the license the following day.

== Programming ==
WGOT-LP aired several locally produced programs and a weekly one-hour show produced by the Civic Media Center and Counterpoise volunteers. The station was a Pacifica Radio affiliate and broadcast several Pacifica programs, including Democracy Now! with Amy Goodman and Juan Gonzalez.

== See also ==
- List of community radio stations in the United States
