= WGRV =

WGRV may refer to:

- WGRV (AM), a radio station (1340 AM) licensed to Greeneville, Tennessee, United States
- WGRV-LP, a defunct low-power radio station (93.1 FM) formerly licensed to Melbourne, Florida, United States
