= Civic Media Center =

Infoshop and library in Florida, U.S.

Coordinates: 29.64797°N 82.32464°W

- Logo

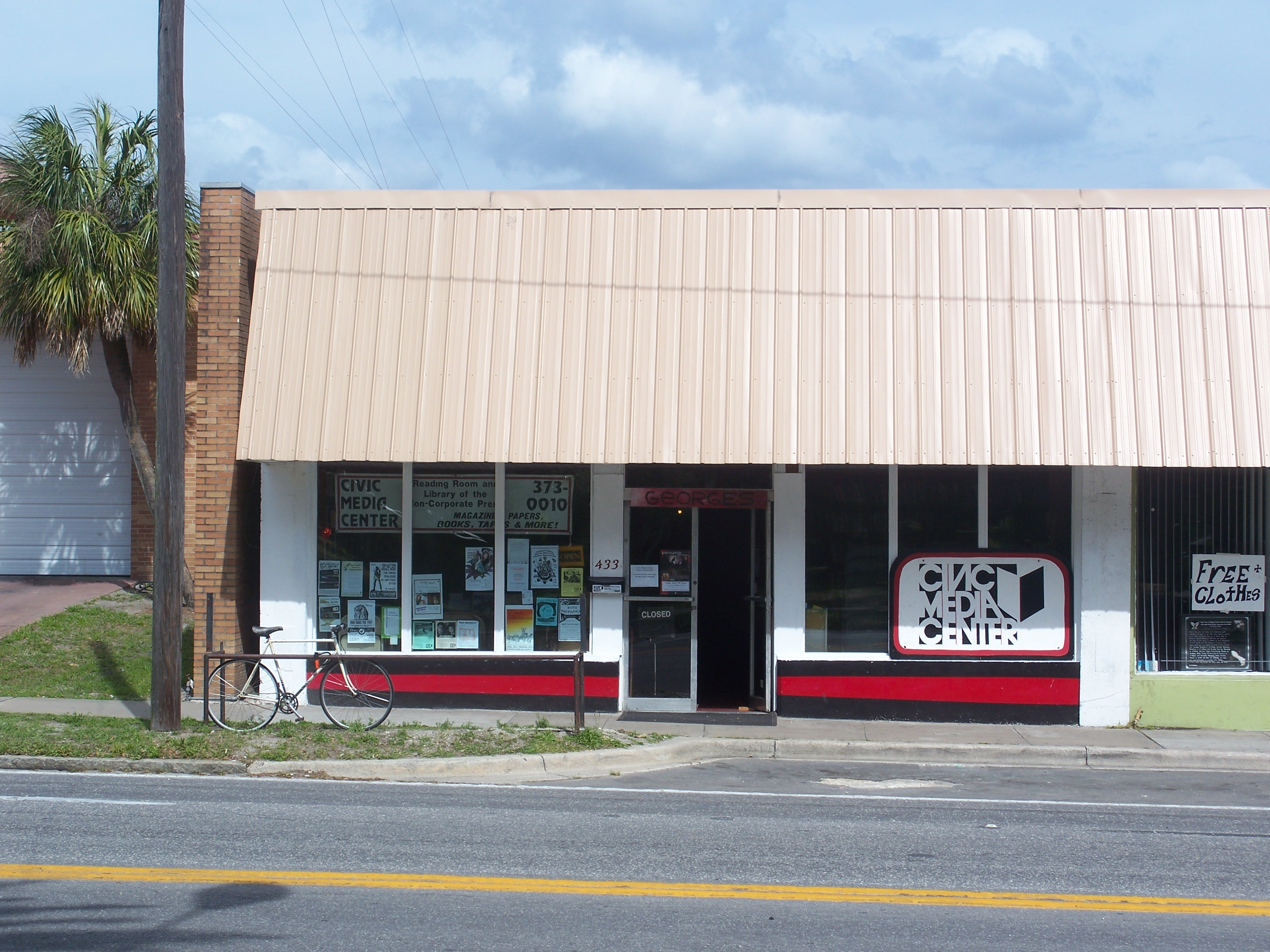
- Exterior of CMC in 2009
- Interactive map of the Civic Media Center area

General information
- Location: 433 South Main Street, Gainesville, USA
- Relocated: 2009

Website
- civicmediacenter.org

The Civic Media Center (CMC) is a nonprofit infoshop, library and reading room in Gainesville, Florida, United States. It was set up in 1993 and in 2009 received the book collection of activist Stetson Kennedy.

== History ==
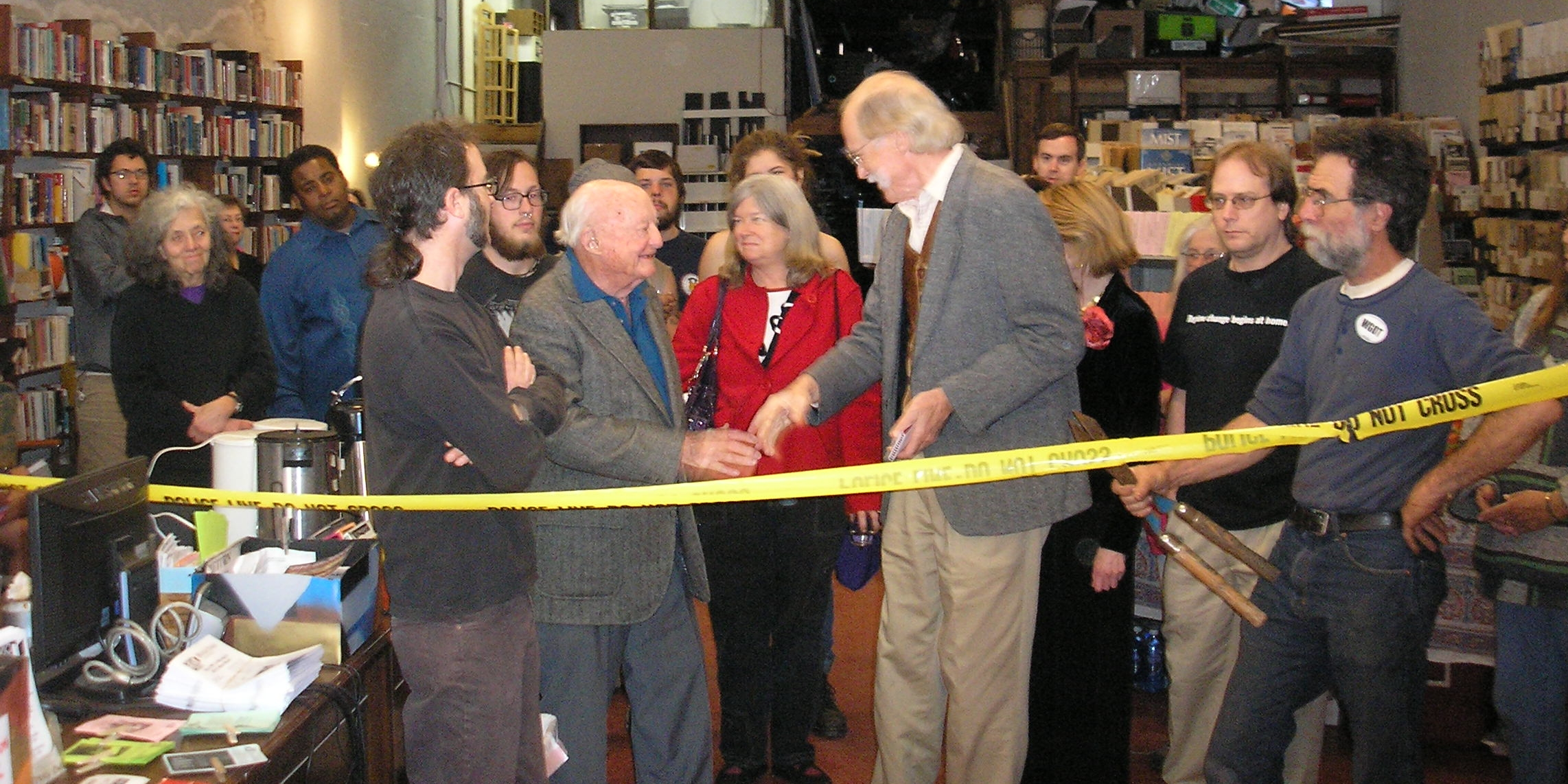
Stetson Kennedy dedicates the CMC's current venue

The Civic Media Center (CMC) was set up as an infoshop and library in 1993 in Gainesville, Florida. Founded as a nonprofit organization, the center was first located at 1021 West University Avenue, near to the University of Florida and housed a library cataloged by the American Council of Learned Societies. It was financially supported by benefit campaigns and member donations. It held its eighth birthday party at the Thomas Center in 2001, with folk singer Doug Gauss. For its twenty fifth birthday it hosted a talk from Amy Goodman.

The CMC began an annual fundraising dinner program in 1999 called SpringBoard. Guests pay from $10 to $20 for a dinner cooked by volunteers and speakers have included Diane Roberts, Nadine Smith and Ann Wright. The CMC moved location again in 2009, to 433 South Main Street in Gainesville. It then became the repository for Stetson Kennedy's personal library, which contained around 2,000 books and publications collected over his career as a folklore archivist and activist. It took several years to catalog the collection.

As well as being a library, the CMC developed into a community resource as a meeting space, music venue and arts center. It hosts film screenings, talks and meetings. It also has a zine collection.

== See also ==
- WGOT-LP
- Counterpoise
