= WCFI =

WCFI may refer to:

- WCFI-LP, a low-power radio station (96.1 FM) licensed to serve Cuyahoga Falls, Ohio, United States
- WCFI (Florida), a defunct radio station (1290 AM) formerly licensed to serve Ocala, Florida, United States
