= WBFT =

WBFT may refer to:

- WBFT-LP, a low-power radio station (105.5 FM) licensed to Micco, Florida, United States
- WBFT-CD, a television station (channel 36, virtual 46) licensed to Sanford, North Carolina, United States
