= WJTK =

Radio station in Columbia City–Lake City, Florida

- Columbia City, Florida; United States
- Broadcast area: Lake City, Florida
- Frequency: 96.5 MHz
- Branding: The Jet

Programming
- Format: Conservative talk
- Affiliations: Salem Radio Network; Townhall News

Ownership
- Owner: Fred Dockins; (Dockins Broadcast Group, LLC)
- Sister stations: WQLC

History
- First air date: 2006
- Last air date: March 2026

Technical information
- Licensing authority: FCC
- Facility ID: 165943
- Class: A
- ERP: 5,000 watts
- HAAT: 59 meters (194 ft)
- Transmitter coordinates: 30°09′20″N 82°38′14″W

Links
- Public license information: Public file; LMS

WJTK (96.5 FM, "The Jet") was a commercial radio station licensed to Columbia City, Florida, United States, and serving the Lake City area. It aired a conservative talk format and was owned by Fred Dockins, through licensee Dockins Broadcast Group, LLC. WJTK's transmitter was sited on SW Journey Court, near County Road 242A, southwest of Lake City. The station operated from 2006 to 2026.

== History ==
The station signed on the air in 2006. WJTK was established by Cesta Newman through her company, Newman Broadcasting; while she claimed a $910,700 new entrant credit in the Federal Communications Commission (FCC) auction where she obtained the construction permit, she was also associated with existing Lake City stations WNFB and WDSR, which her husband owned through Newman Media. The FCC sued Newman Broadcasting to reclaim the credit; the case was settled in 2018.

WJTK went silent in October 2018, after Newman Broadcasting defaulted on a $1.6 million loan from Columbia Bank and was placed into receivership. The receiver, Mark Healy, put the station up for auction in June 2019. That August, Dockins Communications bought the station for $233,580, making it a sister station to WGRO in Lake City and WQLC in Watertown.

Dockins Broadcast Group closed WJTK in March 2026 due to tower issues, and returned the license to the FCC that July.
