= WVBL =

WVBL may refer to:

- WVBL (FM), a radio station (88.5 FM) licensed to serve Bluefield, West Virginia, United States
- WVBL-LP, a defunct radio station (99.9 FM) previously licensed to serve Salem, West Virginia
