= WJED =

WJED may refer to:

- WJED-LP, a low-power radio station (107.9 FM) licensed to serve Guanica, Puerto Rico
- WAGE (FM), a defunct radio station (91.1 FM) formerly licensed to serve Dogwood Lakes Estate, Florida, United States, which held the call sign WJED from 1989 to 2013
