= WAFG =

WAFG may refer to:

- WAFG-LP, a low-power radio station (107.1 FM) licensed to serve Pompano Beach, Florida, United States
- WYBP, a radio station (90.3 FM) licensed to serve Fort Lauderdale, Florida, which held the call sign WAFG until 2012
