= WINV =

DWINV
Beverly Hills, Florida; United States
- Frequency: 1560 kHz
- Branding: Classic Hits the Fox

Programming
- Language: English
- Format: Defunct (formerly Classic Hits, WXOF simulcast)
- Affiliations: Citadel Media, Dial Global

Ownership
- Owner: WGUL-FM, Inc.

History
- First air date: 1966
- Last air date: October 9, 2011
- Former call signs: WYSE (1966–1984); WKIQ (1984–1987); WINV (1987–2012)
- Call sign meaning: INVerness, Florida

Technical information
- Facility ID: 34560
- Class: D
- Power: 5,000 watts day 4,100 watts critical hours
- Transmitter coordinates: 28°50′30.00″N 82°22′16.00″W

WINV (1560 AM, "Classic Hits the Fox") was a radio station broadcasting a classic hits music format, simulcasting WXOF 96.3 FM Yankeetown, Florida. Formerly licensed to Beverly Hills, Florida, United States, and originally licensed to Inverness, the station was owned by WGUL-FM, Inc. and featured programming from Citadel Media and Dial Global.

WINV went silent on October 9, 2011. On September 4, 2012, the station's owners submitted the license to the Federal Communications Commission (FCC) for cancellation, saying they had no plans to return the station to the air. The FCC cancelled the station's license and deleted the WINV call sign from the FCC database.
