= Counterpoise =

Counterpoise (1997-2011) is an alternative review journal formerly based in Gainesville, Florida (United States). It was founded in 1997 by Charles Willett (1932-2012), as a project of the AIP Task Force of the American Library Association's Social Responsibilities Round Table. In January 2001, Counterpoise became a project of the Civic Media Center (an alternative library also located in Gainesville, Florida). Counterpoise magazine focused on marginalized publications—books, magazines, and films on controversial topics or viewpoints that are not adequately represented in American mainstream press. The magazine was released on a quarterly basis; one issue each year was a double issue.

Counterpoise operated as a collective, wherein all members participated in the process of creating and publishing the magazine. The Collective was composed of volunteers and student interns from the University of Florida and Florida State University. The magazine was distributed throughout the US, Canada, Great Britain, and Europe; subscribers and contributors came from a wide range of fields and included historians, journalists, librarians, teachers, and activists of all stripes. Both the CMC and Counterpoise are non-profit organizations.

In 2011, Charles Willett retired as founding editor and publication of the journal ceased. Back issues can still be ordered through the CMC.

Former volunteers from the Counterpoise collective and the CMC produce a weekly talk radio show for Gainesville's low power FM station WGOT-LP 100.1, which began broadcasting in January 2008. The show (Counterpoise Radio) airs locally on Fridays at 2pm.
