= WPHK =

Radio station in Blountstown–Panama City, Florida

- Blountstown, Florida; United States
- Broadcast area: Panama City, Florida
- Frequency: 102.7 MHz

Programming
- Language: English
- Format: Christian radio

Ownership
- Owner: La Promesa Foundation
- Sister stations: WYBT

History
- First air date: December 18, 1968 (as WRTM at 102.3)
- Former call signs: WRTM (1968–1986)
- Former frequencies: 102.3 MHz (1968–1999)

Technical information
- Licensing authority: FCC
- Facility ID: 5892
- Class: C3
- ERP: 13,000 watts
- HAAT: 97 meters (318 ft)
- Transmitter coordinates: 30°27′15″N 85°02′32″W

Links
- Public license information: Public file; LMS
- Webcast: http://streema.com/radios/WPHK
- Website: http://www.grnonline.com

WPHK (102.7 FM) is an American radio station licensed to serve Blountstown, Florida, United States. The station began broadcast operations in December 1968 as "WRTM" on 102.3 MHz under the ownership of the Maupin Broadcasting Company. The station's broadcast license is currently held by La Promesa Foundation.

== Programming ==
WPHK broadcasts a Christian radio format to the greater Panama City, Florida, area.

== History ==
This station was founded as a Class A facility broadcasting with 3,000 watts of effective radiated power on a frequency of 102.3 MHz. Licensed by the Federal Communications Commission (FCC) to serve Blountstown, Florida, the station was founded by the Maupin Broadcasting Company, with Robert L. Maupin serving as company president, general manager, and chief engineer. Originally licensed as "WRTM", the station was the FM sister station to WKMK (1000 AM).

Both stations were purchased by the Calhoun Broadcasting Corporation in May 1974. The FM station aired a contemporary music format in conjunction with sister station WKMK. WRTM and WKMK were acquired by the Southeast Radio Corporation on June 1, 1980. After the sale, the FM station broadcast a country & western music format, separate from the AM station, with roughly 5 hours of farm-oriented specialty programming each week.

In May 1984, Southeast Radio Corporation reached a deal to sell WRTM to O'Quinn and Stone Enterprises, Inc. The FCC approved the sale on June 28, 1984, and after several extensions the deal was finally consummated on October 29, 1985. This ownership proved short-lived as the station encountered financial difficulties and the broadcast license was involuntarily transferred from O'Quinn and Stone Enterprises, Inc., to Hentz McClellan in February 1986. The next month, Hentz McClellan found a new buyer for WRTM in Blountstown Communications, Inc. (This new company is owned 60% by Harry S. Hagan and 40% by his wife, Cathryn W. Hagan.) The FCC approved the sale on June 6, 1986, and the deal was eventually consummated on November 24, 1987. While the sale was in progress and at the new owner's request, this station was assigned the call sign "WPHK" by the FCC on July 21, 1986.

In December 1998, WPHK applied to the FCC for authorization to change broadcast frequencies from 102.3 MHz to 102.7 MHz. (The move allowed WWAV in Santa Rosa Beach, Florida, to apply for a power increase.) The Commission granted the station a construction permit to make this change on April 22, 1999, with a scheduled expiration date of April 22, 2002. In January 2001, with construction underway, the station requested an additional modification: a change from Class A to Class C3 licensing and an increase in effective radiated power from 3,000 to 13,000 watts. The FCC granted this permit modification on February 5, 2001. Construction and testing were completed in April 2002 and WPHK applied for a new broadcast license to cover the authorized changes. The FCC issued the new license on October 11, 2002.

On August 31, 2015, WPHK changed their format from country to Christian radio, branded as "Divine Word Radio", as a result of a sale by Blountstown Communications, Inc. to Divine Word Communications. Subsequently, WPHK, six other stations, and four translators were sold to La Promesa Foundation effective January 8, 2016, at a purchase price of $1,073,907.59.
