= WCNU =

Crestview, Florida; United States
- Broadcast area: Northwest Florida; South Alabama
- Frequency: 1010 kHz

Programming
- Format: Defunct

Ownership
- Owner: Jerry W. Milligan, Sr.

History
- First air date: 1948

Technical information
- Facility ID: 18094
- Power: 1,000 watts (later 10,000 watts)
- Transmitter coordinates: 30°42′37″N 86°34′19″W

WCNU (1010 AM) was a radio station located in Crestview, Florida, United States. The station served the Northwest Florida and South Alabama areas.

== History ==
Samuel F. (Sam) Townsend became the general manager and first announcer on WCNU radio station in Crestview, Florida in April, 1948. The station began broadcasting on a frequency of 1010 kHz on the AM dial with 1000 watts of power. WCNU operated from its studio in Radio Valley on State Road 85 south of the city limits.

WCNU played a country-western format for its listeners in the Northwest Florida/South Alabama area. It was known as the "Community Station" and for playing "Dixie" before and after the news in the morning. The station was also known for signing off every evening to "Canadian Sunset."

In the late 1950s, WCNU and WDSP were owned and operated by W.D. "Cooter" Douglass and his wife, Marie. In 1959, citing his actions "in the spirit of emphasizing the public interest" and his "faithful reporting of the news and fearless comment thereon from Radio Stations WDSP, DeFuniak Springs and WCNU, Crestview", the Florida Legislature passed a resolution designating U.S. Route 90 passing through Walton and Okaloosa counties as the "William D. "Cooter" Douglass Highway."

In the early 1960s, Sam Townsend and Vernon Cooper formed a partnership and bought the station. Morning shows like "the Birthday Calendar" (folks called in to wish friends and relatives birthday greetings) and "the Trading Post" (forerunner of Craigslist) were daily staples for many in Okaloosa County.

WCNU was purchased by Jerry W. Milligan, Sr. in the late 1970s. In 1980, Milligan changed the format of the station to light rock/pop music and, in September 1983, increased its power to 10,000 watts. The new format and high power significantly increased the station's listener appeal and listener area. WCNU went out of business in 1989.

Licensed to Eagle International Broadcasting Inc., based in Pensacola, Florida, WCNU's final FCC license expired on February 1, 1996, and it was cancelled and deleted from the FCC database on August 29, 1996.

== Trivia ==
In the 2006 episode of Nip/Tuck, "Conor McNamara 2026", the fictional television station reporting on the hurricane is WCNU.

On the January 11, 2009 episode of the CBS crime drama Cold Case titled Breaking News, a reporter from a fictional Philadelphia TV station named WCNU was murdered.

In the 2005 film, The Dukes of Hazzard, a TV reporter purportedly from the local TV station identified the station as WCNU.
