= WLJM-LP =

- Miami Beach, Florida; United States
- Frequency: 95.3 MHz
- Branding: 95.3 The Cross

Programming
- Format: Religious

Ownership
- Owner: Calvary Chapel of Miami Beach, Inc.

History
- First air date: 2016-04-18

Technical information
- Licensing authority: FCC
- Facility ID: 194917
- Class: L1
- ERP: 49 watts
- HAAT: 41 metres (135 ft)
- Transmitter coordinates: 25°55′3″N 80°09′26″W

Links
- Public license information: LMS
- Website: Original Website

WLJM-LP (95.3 FM) is a radio station licensed to serve the community of Miami Beach, Florida. The station is owned by Calvary Chapel of Miami Beach, Inc. It airs a religious format.

The station was assigned the WLJM-LP call letters by the Federal Communications Commission on April 24, 2015.

== See also ==
- List of radio stations in Florida
- List of religious radio stations
