= WGUL =

- Dunedin, Florida; United States
- Broadcast area: Tampa Bay Area
- Frequency: 860 kHz
- Branding: AM 860 The Answer

Programming
- Format: Conservative talk radio
- Affiliations: Salem Radio Network

Ownership
- Owner: Salem Communications; (Salem Communications Holding Corporation)
- Sister stations: WLCC, WTBN, WTWD

History
- First air date: 1960
- Former call signs: WAZE (1960–1982); WAMA (1982–1986)
- Call sign meaning: reference to the Gulf of Mexico

Technical information
- Licensing authority: FCC
- Facility ID: 1177
- Class: B
- Power: 5,000 watts day; 1,500 watts night
- Transmitter coordinates: 27°59′55.00″N 82°42′1.00″W
- Translator: 93.7 W229DJ (Dunedin)

Links
- Public license information: Public file; LMS
- Website: theanswertampa.com

WGUL (860 AM) is a radio station broadcasting a conservative talk radio format. Licensed to Dunedin, Florida, United States, it serves the Tampa Bay area. The station is owned by Salem Communications and features only syndicated conservative weekday programming from Salem Radio Network. 860 kHz is a Canadian clear-channel frequency.

== History ==
WGUL previously ran a live, locally based "Music of Your Life" format from 1985 to August 12, 2005. That year, Salem Communications acquired WGUL from its previous owners, WGUL-FM, Inc., in which they changed its format to its current conservative talk format. WGUL-FM, Inc. continues in business today under that name, as owners and operators of stations in Florida's Nature Coast region (including WGHR and WXOF), though Salem currently holds the WGUL call sign and intellectual property.

== Programming ==
The content of WGUL's talk programming is conservative with show hosts such as Phil Grande, Hugh Hewitt and Mike Gallagher. The weekend show line up includes Kim Komando.

The station previously broadcast two shows hosted by Gary Gauthier, It's God's Money and All About Florida Real Estate until Gauthier was arrested in January 2014, for running a Ponzi scheme from 2005 until 2010, which allegedly bilked $6 million of retirement savings from at least 38 elderly people.
