= WPRY (AM) =

- Perry, Florida; United States
- Frequency: 1400 kHz
- Branding: Super 60s & 70s

Programming
- Format: Classic hits
- Affiliations: Westwood One

Ownership
- Owner: Dockins Communications, Inc.
- Sister stations: WFDZ; WPRY-FM

History
- First air date: 1977
- Last air date: February 7, 2024

Technical information
- Licensing authority: FCC
- Facility ID: 54920
- Class: C
- Power: 1,000 watts unlimited
- Transmitter coordinates: 30°6′27.8″N 83°33′59.5″W
- Translator: 95.3 W237CN (Perry)

Links
- Public license information: Public file; LMS

WPRY (1400 kHz) was an AM radio station that broadcast a classic hits format. Licensed to Perry, Florida, United States, the station was owned by Dockins Communications, Inc. WPRY was heard on an FM translator on 95.3 MHz.

Dockins Communications surrendered WPRY's license to the Federal Communications Commission on January 31, 2024; it was cancelled the same day. The license was reinstated on February 16, 2024, then cancelled again on December 12, 2024.
