= WRWS-LP =

- Daytona Beach, Florida; United States
- Frequency: 99.1 MHz

Programming
- Format: Urban contemporary

Ownership
- Owner: Bethune-Cookman University; (Bethune-Cookman College, Inc.)
- Sister stations: WELE

History
- First air date: 2008

Technical information
- Licensing authority: FCC
- Facility ID: 134386
- Class: L1
- ERP: 100 watts
- HAAT: 28.9 meters (95 ft)
- Transmitter coordinates: 29°12′20.10″N 81°1′51.60″W

Links
- Public license information: LMS

WRWS-LP (99.1 FM) is the campus radio station of Bethune-Cookman University in Daytona Beach, Florida. The station broadcasts in the Daytona Beach area as an LPFM. The station is non-profit, entirely student-run, and broadcasts an Urban contemporary format.
