= Diane Roberts =

American author, columnist, essayist, radio commentator, reviewer and educator

Diane K. Roberts
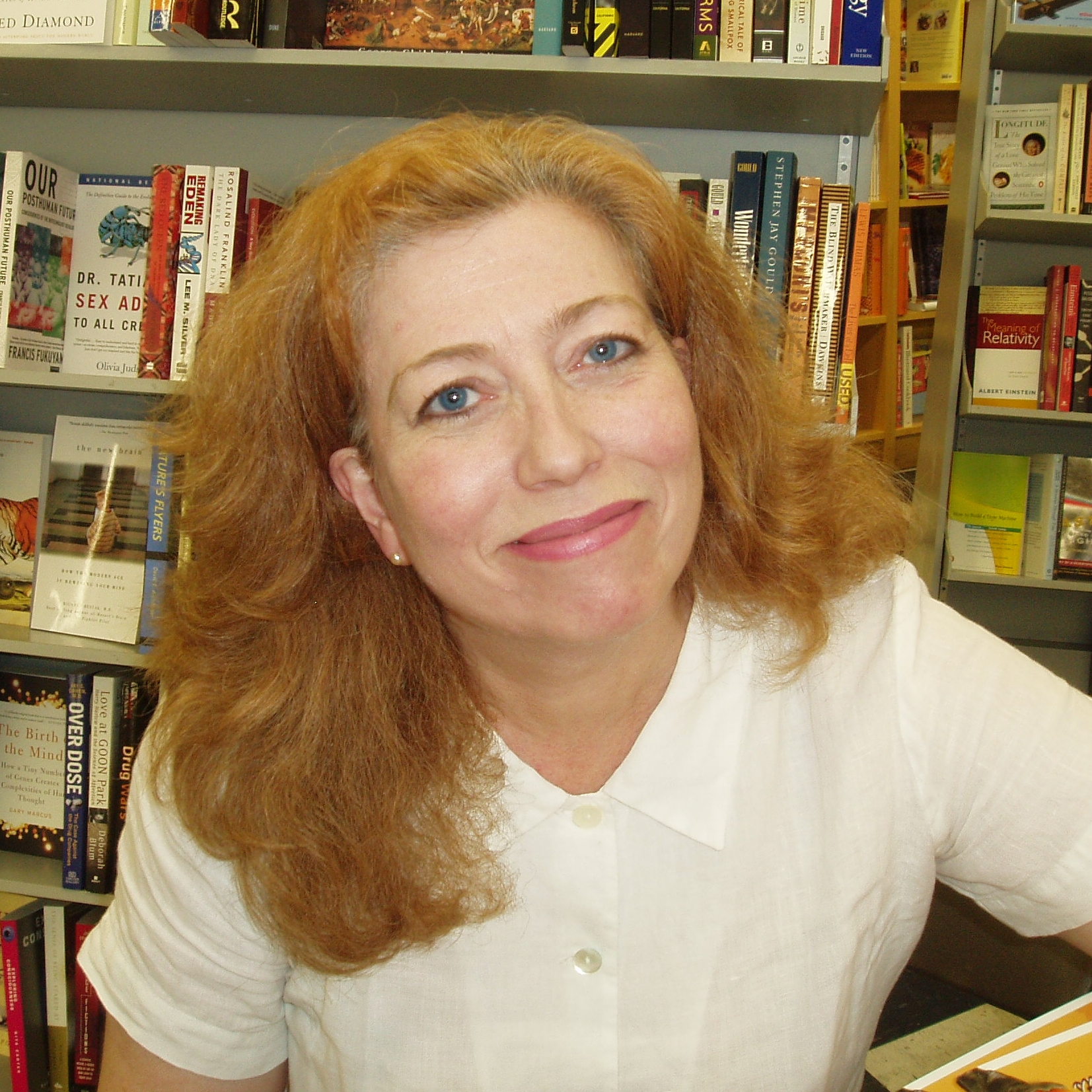
- Roberts at Goerings BookStore on May 16, 2005
- Born: Tallahassee, Florida, US
- Occupations: Professor, columnist, author
- Website: english.fsu.edu/faculty/diane-roberts

Diane Roberts is an American author, columnist, essayist, radio commentator, reviewer and professor. She is the author of four books and a documentary-maker for the BBC.

== Early life, family and education ==
An eighth-generation Floridian whose family has lived in Florida since 1799, Roberts is related to numerous famous Floridians, including Florida's 19th governor Napoleon Bonaparte Broward, and L. Clayton Roberts who was director of Florida's Division of Elections during the 2000 US presidential election.

Roberts attended Brasenose College, Oxford as a Marshall Scholar.

== Career ==
Roberts has been a commentator at NPR, a member of the Tampa Bay Times editorial board, and a journalist for The New York Times, The Guardian, The Washington Post, the Atlanta Journal-Constitution, the Florida Phoenix, and the Orlando Sentinel.

Roberts is professor of literature and writing at Florida State University and a visiting fellow in creative writing at the University of Northumbria in England, specializing in Southern United States culture.

== Publications ==
Books

- Tribal: College Football and the Secret Heart of America, HarperCollins Publishers, 2015
- Dream State: Eight Generations of Swamp Lawyers, Conquistadors, Confederate Daughters, Banana Republicans, and other Florida Wildlife Free Press, 2004.
- Faulkner and Southern Womanhood, University of Georgia Press, 1993.
- The Myth of Aunt Jemima, Routledge, 1994.
