= WGHR (FM) =

Radio station in Spring Hill, Florida

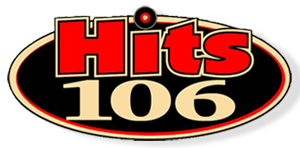
- Spring Hill, Florida; United States
- Broadcast area: Crystal River, Florida
- Frequency: 106.3 MHz
- Branding: Hits 106

Programming
- Format: Classic hits
- Affiliations: Good Time Oldies (Westwood One); Premiere Networks

Ownership
- Owner: WGUL-FM, Inc.

History
- First air date: October 31, 1989 (as WEOA at 97.1)
- Former call signs: WEOA (1989–1990); WPDS (1990–1992); WXOF (1992–1999); WGUL-FM (1999–2005); WJQB (2005–2014)
- Former frequencies: 97.1 MHz (1989–1998)
- Call sign meaning: "Greatest Hits Radio"

Technical information
- Licensing authority: FCC
- Facility ID: 26616
- Class: C3
- ERP: 25,000 watts
- HAAT: 96 meters (315 ft)
- Transmitter coordinates: 28°31′41.00″N 82°32′45.00″W

Links
- Public license information: Public file; LMS
- Webcast: Listen Live
- Website: greatesthits106.com

WGHR (106.3 MHz) is an FM radio station broadcasting Westwood One's Good Time Oldies format. Licensed to Spring Hill, Florida, United States, it serves the northern Tampa Bay area, including Hernando and Citrus Counties. The station is currently owned by WGUL-FM, Inc. (named after the station's former call sign; see WGUL).

== History ==
The station went on the air on 97.1 MHz as WEOA on October 31, 1989. On January 5, 1990, the station changed its call sign to WPDS; on August 14, 1992, it changed to WXOF.

As WXOF, then a country music-formatted station, the station would swap frequencies in 1998 with Holiday-based WLVU-FM 106.3 (now WSUN), in order for the latter station to get a stronger signal in the Tampa Bay area.

At 106.3 MHz, on January 11, 1999, the station changed its call sign to WGUL-FM and format to the Music of Your Life, and on January 1, 2005, the calls changed to WJQB.

On May 27, 2014, WJQB relaunched as "Hits 106". The station changed to its current WGHR call sign on June 1, 2014. On May 5, 2015, WGHR shifted its format from oldies to classic hits.
