= WPLK =

Radio station in Palatka, Florida

- Palatka, Florida; United States
- Frequency: 800 kHz
- Branding: WPLK 800 AM

Programming
- Format: Soft Oldies

Ownership
- Owner: Natkim Radio, LLC
- Sister stations: WIYD

History
- First air date: 1957 (as WSUZ)
- Former call signs: WSUZ (1957-July 13, 1990)
- Call sign meaning: W PaLatKa

Technical information
- Licensing authority: FCC
- Facility ID: 54721
- Class: B
- Power: 1,000 watts day 334 watts night
- Transmitter coordinates: 29°39′7.00″N 81°35′32.00″W
- Translator: 98.3 W252DL (Killearn)

Links
- Public license information: Public file; LMS
- Webcast: Listen Live
- Website: putnamradio.com/wplk

WPLK (800 AM) is a radio station licensed to Palatka, Florida, broadcasting a soft oldies radio format. The station is currently owned by Radio Palatka, Inc. Programming is also heard on FM translator station W252DL at 98.3 MHz in the Killearn district of East Palatka, Florida.

== History ==
The station first signed on in 1957 as WSUZ. The station was owned by Raymac Inc. (Raymond P. McMillin and Carmen Macri), and was a daytimer, required to be off the air at night to avoid interfering with other stations on AM 800.

In 1957, Mr. Carmen Macri (the Mac of Raymac) was identified as the co-owner of the station, as well as WQIK in Jacksonville, Florida and WWOK in Charlotte, North Carolina.

In 1958, the license was transferred to just Mr. McMillin.

In 1961, an application was filed to transfer the license to WSUZ, Inc, however that transfer was not completed. In 1962, the station went into receivership under the custody of George J. Duck. In May 1963, the license was transferred to Bullock and Strickland, and in 1967 to just Wayne E. Bullock as Radio Station WSUZ. Mr. Strickland was a Washington, D.C.–based attorney and part owner of the station.

As of 1969, the station was an affiliate of the Mutual Broadcasting System.

In 1977, the station moved to a new transmitter location and studio. The studio had been at 309½ St John Avenue and was moved to old San Mateo Road.

In 1978, the station license was assigned to W. G. Enterprises, Inc. for a reported $155,000.

The 1978 license renewal was in the name of Radio Palatka, Inc., which controlled the license until 2010.

In 1986, the station was airing country western music, and broke format to do a political interview with unsuccessful gubernatorial candidate Mark Goldstein.

As of 1987, the station was an affiliate of the Atlanta Braves' baseball radio network

In 1990, Radio Palatka was assigned to the trustee oversight of Valarie J Hall of Jacksonville, Florida. That is when the call sign was changed to the current WPLK.

In 1997, the station was returned to the control of Wayne E. Bullock, Barbara K. Bullock, James M. Hester and Gail B. Hester.

An attempt was made in 2007 to sell the station to Radio Florida LLC for $400,000 with a stated intent to move the station from Putnam County and diplex the signal with WIYD. Shortly thereafter, another application was filed to transfer the license to Flagler County Broadcasting LLC, with James E Martin having a 70% controlling interest in the ownership; however neither sale was completed and the license remained with Radio Palatka, Inc.

In 2010, the station license was transferred to NATKIN, LLC, (Charles E. Alford, Jr) the current licensee. The sales price reported to the FCC was $425,000.
