= WJSB =

- Crestview, Florida; United States
- Broadcast area: Fort Walton Beach, Florida
- Frequency: 1050 kHz

Programming
- Format: Country music (WAAZ-FM simulcast)
- Affiliations: CBS Radio, Atlanta Braves Radio Network

Ownership
- Owner: Crestview Broadcasting Co., Inc.
- Sister stations: WAAZ-FM

History
- First air date: September 15, 1954

Technical information
- Licensing authority: FCC
- Facility ID: 14494
- Class: D
- Power: 3,100 watts day only
- Transmitter coordinates: 30°46′1.00″N 86°35′7.00″W
- Translator: (101.1 MHz) W266DF (Crestview)

Links
- Public license information: Public file; LMS

WJSB (1050 AM) is a radio station broadcasting a country music format, simulcasting WAAZ-FM (104.7). Licensed to Crestview, Florida, United States, the station serves the Fort Walton Beach area. The station is currently owned by Crestview Broadcasting Co., Inc. and features programming from CBS News Radio.
