= WWSD =

- Quincy, Florida; United States
- Broadcast area: Tallahassee area
- Frequency: 1230 kHz

Programming
- Format: Defunct

Ownership
- Owner: Tuff-Starr Jam Communication, Inc.

Technical information
- Facility ID: 68319
- Class: C
- Transmitter coordinates: 30°34′55.00″N 84°35′59.00″W

WWSD (1230 AM) was a radio station that broadcast an Urban Contemporary format. Formerly licensed to Quincy, Florida, United States, the station served the Tallahassee area. The station was owned by Tuff-Starr Jam Communication, Inc.

The station's license was cancelled and its call sign deleted by the Federal Communications Commission on February 3, 2012.
