= WRAP (Florida) =

Winter Park, Florida; United States
- Broadcast area: Winter Park, Florida
- Frequency: 833 kHz/360 meters

Ownership
- Owner: Winter Park Electrical Construction Company

History
- First air date: March 10, 1923

WRAP (833 AM) was the first radio station in the Central Florida area. It was licensed from March 10, 1923, through September 7, 1923.
