= WGLJ-LP =

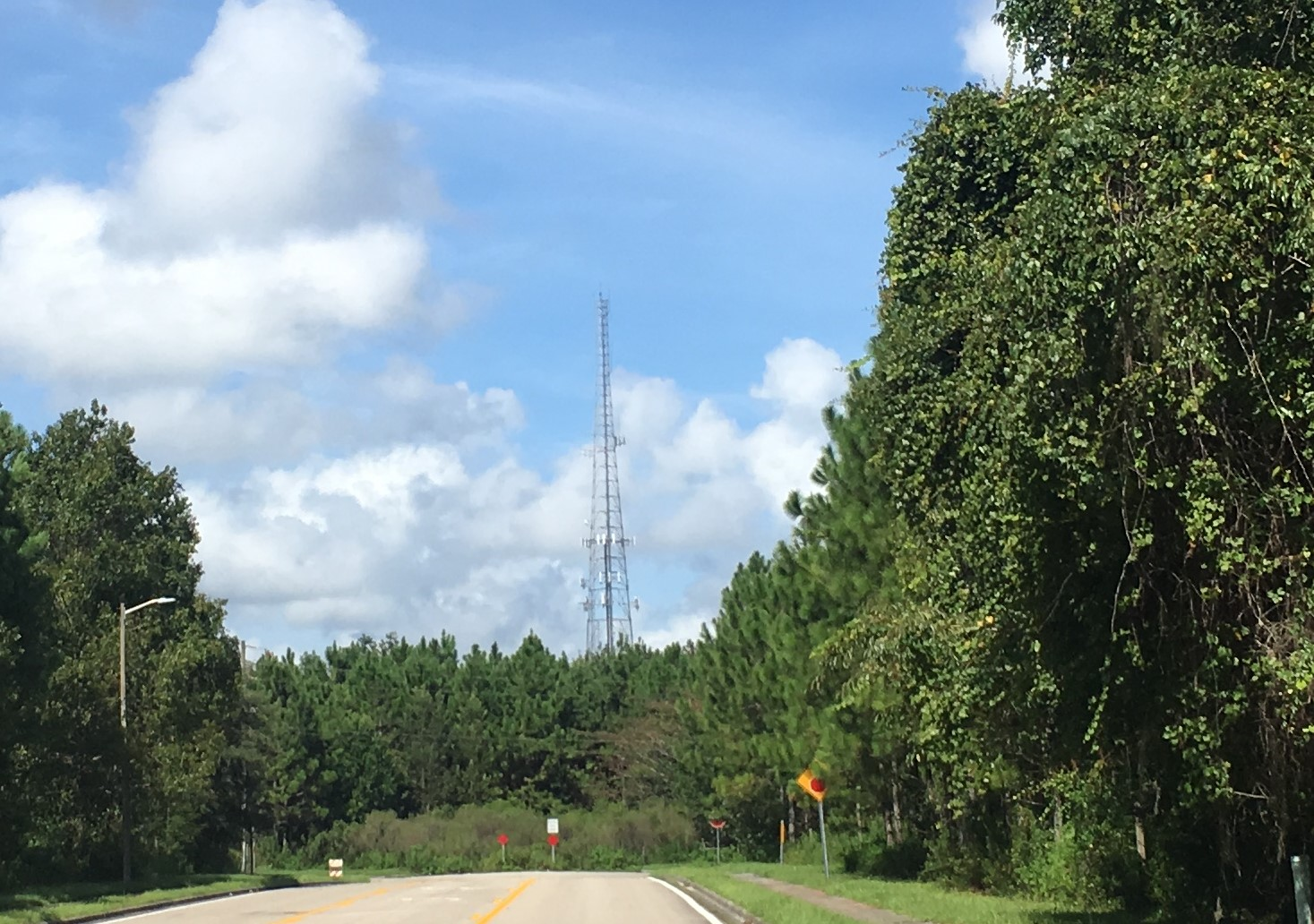
- Gainesville, Florida; United States
- Frequency: 94.7 MHz

Ownership
- Owner: Calvary Chapel Gainesville

History
- First air date: 4 September 2019

Technical information
- Licensing authority: FCC
- Facility ID: 135119
- Class: L1
- ERP: 25 watts
- HAAT: 58.5 meters (192 ft)
- Transmitter coordinates: 29°41′12.87912″N 82°26′47.39151″W

Links
- Public license information: LMS
- Website: www.ccgainesville.com

WGLJ-LP (94.7 FM) is a radio station licensed to Gainesville, Florida, United States. The station is currently owned by Calvary Chapel Gainesville. WGLJ shared this frequency with WVFP-LP, owned by the Faith Presbyterian Church.
