= WSLR-LP =

- Sarasota, Florida; United States
- Frequency: 96.5 MHz

Programming
- Format: Variety
- Affiliations: Pacifica Radio Network

History
- First air date: August 1, 2005
- Former call signs: WUWU-LP (2004)
- Call sign meaning: Sarasota Local Radio

Technical information
- Licensing authority: FCC
- Facility ID: 132828
- Class: L1
- ERP: 23 watts
- HAAT: 61.3 meters
- Transmitter coordinates: 27°18′42.00″N 82°31′43.00″W

Links
- Public license information: LMS
- Website: wslr.org

WSLR-LP (96.5 FM, "WSLR-LPFM") is a listener-supported, low-power community radio station based in Sarasota, Florida, United States. The station also streams online. WSLR-LP was launched on August 1, 2005, by Arlene Sweeting and David Beaton. The station is associated with the Fogartyville Community Media and Arts Center in Sarasota.

== See also ==
- List of community radio stations in the United States
