= WAAZ-FM =

- Crestview, Florida; United States
- Broadcast area: Ft Walton Beach metropolitan area
- Frequency: 104.7 MHz
- Branding: The Good Country

Programming
- Format: Country music
- Affiliations: Atlanta Braves Radio Network

Ownership
- Owner: Crestview Broadcasting Company, Inc.
- Sister stations: WJSB

History
- First air date: 1965

Technical information
- Licensing authority: FCC
- Facility ID: 14495
- Class: C1
- ERP: 100,000 watts
- HAAT: 148 meters
- Transmitter coordinates: 30°46′1.00″N 86°35′7.00″W
- Repeater: 1050 WJSB

Links
- Public license information: Public file; LMS
- Webcast: Listen Live
- Website: waaz1047.com

WAAZ-FM (104.7 MHz) is a commercial FM radio station broadcasting a country music format. Licensed to Crestview, Florida, United States, the station serves the Ft Walton Beach metropolitan area. The station's 100,000 watt signal can be heard in parts of the Florida Panhandle and Southern Alabama. The station is owned by Crestview Broadcasting Company, Inc. with its studios and transmitter off West First Avenue.

The station is off the air from 12 am-5 am local time from Monday through Saturdays, and from 12 am-7 am local time on Sundays because the station is 100 percent live with no automation.

In early 2013, the station got a facelift in its equipment, along with a website and audio stream.

WAAZ-FM carries Atlanta Braves baseball and Troy University sports as well as news from CBS News Radio.
