= Everglades Radio Network =

WFLU-LP and WFLP-LP
WFLU-LP: Miles City, Florida; WFLP-LP: Collier Co Rest Area, Florida; United States
- Broadcast area: Interstate 75 along Alligator Alley in Collier County, Florida
- Frequencies: WFLU-LP: 107.9 MHz; WFLP-LP: 98.7 MHz
- Branding: Everglades Radio Network

Ownership
- Owner: Florida Department of Transportation; (State of Florida)

History
- First air date: WFLU-LP: October 2003
- Last air date: WFLU-LP: January 9, 2017

Technical information
- Facility ID: WFLU-LP: 134910; WFLP-LP: 134872
- Class: WFLU-LP: L1; WFLP-LP: L1
- ERP: WFLU-LP: 90 watts; WFLP-LP: 100 watts
- Transmitter coordinates: WFLU-LP: 26°9′41.3″N 81°20′57.3″W

Links
- Website: www.dep.state.fl.us/ern/

Everglades Radio Network was a network of travelers' information stations serving the Alligator Alley segment of Interstate 75 in the Everglades region of Florida. Owned by the Florida Department of Transportation and jointly programmed by the FDOT and the Florida Department of Environmental Protection, the network was based at Florida Gulf Coast University in Ft. Myers. It consisted of two low-power FM radio stations, WFLP-LP 98.7 FM, licensed to the Collier County Rest Area (near Mile Marker 63) and WFLU-LP 107.9 FM in Miles City (Exit 80, State Road 29). The coverage area of the two transmitters covered most of Alligator Alley within Collier County.

The FDOT surrendered the licenses for both stations to the Federal Communications Commission (FCC) on January 9, 2017; the availability of cellular and internet service was provided as the rationale for the service provided by the stations no longer being needed. The FCC cancelled the licenses for both stations on February 6, 2017.
