= WIYD =

- Palatka, Florida; United States
- Frequency: 1260 kHz

Programming
- Format: Classic Country
- Affiliations: Westwood One

Ownership
- Owner: Natkim Radio, LLC
- Sister stations: WPLK

History
- First air date: February 14, 1947
- Former call signs: WWPF (1947–1979)

Technical information
- Licensing authority: FCC
- Facility ID: 25862
- Class: D
- Power: 400 watts day 135 watts night
- Transmitter coordinates: 29°39′7.00″N 81°35′32.00″W
- Translator: (104.9 MHz) W285FR (Palatka)

Links
- Public license information: Public file; LMS
- Webcast: Listen Live
- Website: putnamradio.com/wiyd

WIYD (1260 AM) is a radio station broadcasting a Classic Country radio format. It is licensed to Palatka, Florida, and is currently owned by Natkim Radio, LLC. It features programming from Westwood One.

The FCC first licensed this station to begin operations on June 24, 1947, using callsign WWPF.
