= WAFZ-FM =

WAFZ and WAFZ-FM
Immokalee, Florida; United States
- Broadcast area: Collier County, Florida
- Frequencies: WAFZ: 1490 kHz; WAFZ-FM: 92.1 MHz
- Branding: La Ley 92.1 FM & 99.7 FM

Programming
- Format: Regional Mexican

Ownership
- Owner: Glades Media Company LLC

History
- First air date: WAFZ: October 14, 1964; WAFZ-FM: June 30, 1987
- Former call signs: WAFZ: WCOF (1964–1974); WKEM (1974–1984); WZOR (1984–1995); WAFZ-FM: WIKX-FM (1987–1988); WCOO (1988–1994); WGCQ (1994–2002)

Technical information
- Licensing authority: FCC
- Facility ID: WAFZ: 25811; WAFZ-FM: 47387
- Class: WAFZ: C; WAFZ-FM: A
- Power: WAFZ: 560 watts (day); 700 watts (night)
- ERP: WAFZ-FM: 5,600 watts
- HAAT: WAFZ-FM: 100 meters (330 ft)
- Transmitter coordinates: WAFZ: 26°26′54.00″N 81°16′17.00″W
- Translator(s): WAFZ: 99.7 W259CZ (Immokalee)

Links
- Public license information: WAFZ: Public file; LMS; WAFZ-FM: Public file; LMS
- Webcast: Listen Live
- Website: wafz.com

WAFZ-FM (92.1 FM) and WAFZ (1490 AM) are commercial radio stations licensed to Immokalee, Florida, United States. They jointly simulcast a Regional Mexican radio format as "La Ley 92.1 FM & 99.7 FM". They are owned by Glades Media Company LLC.

WAFZ-FM is a Class A FM station with an effective radiated power (ERP) of 5,600 watts. WAFZ is a Class C AM station powered at 560 watts by day and 700 watts at night, using a non-directional antenna. Programming is also heard on 250-watt FM translator W259CZ at 99.7 MHz.

== History ==
The AM station signed on the air on October 14, 1964, as WCOF; by 1974, the call letters were changed to WKEM. During the 1970s it aired a country music format and was a network affiliate of the Mutual Broadcasting System. In 1976, it was acquired by Gold Coast Broadcasting.

The FM station signed on the air on June 30, 1987. Its original call letters were WIKX-FM. In the 1990s, the station switched to a Spanish language Tejano music format. Popular DJs included Gabino Soliz, "El Chavo Alegre," and Irma Ayala.

In 1999, the FM station was acquired by Praise Enterprises Naples LLC for $1 million. That company put a Christian Contemporary format on the it, using the call sign WGHQ.

The stations went silent for a while when management ran into financial problems. They were bought by Glades Media which began airing a Regional Mexican format. The stations play newer hits of the Regional Mexican genre.

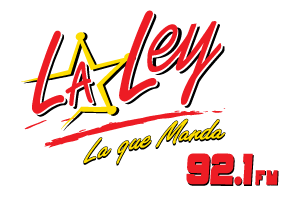
Previous logo
