= WEJF =

Coordinates: 28°02′49″N 80°40′34″W

- Palm Bay, Florida; United States
- Broadcast area: Palm Bay - Melbourne
- Frequency: 90.3 MHz

Programming
- Format: Christian radio

Ownership
- Owner: Florida Public Radio, Inc.
- Sister stations: WPIO, WKFA

History
- First air date: September 1992
- Call sign meaning: We Encourage Jesus Followers

Technical information
- Licensing authority: FCC
- Facility ID: 51316
- Class: C2
- ERP: 300 watts (horiz.); 30,000 watts (vert.)
- HAAT: 147 meters (482 ft)

Links
- Public license information: Public file; LMS
- Website: www.wejf.net

WEJF is a Christian radio station licensed to Palm Bay, Florida, broadcasting on 90.3 FM. The station serves the Palm Bay-Melbourne area, and is owned by Florida Public Radio, Inc.
