= WPIO =

Coordinates: 28°34′49″N 80°51′00″W

- Titusville, Florida; United States
- Broadcast area: Titusville - Cocoa
- Frequency: 89.3 MHz

Programming
- Format: Christian radio

Ownership
- Owner: Florida Public Radio, Inc.
- Sister stations: WEJF

History
- First air date: October 19, 1975
- Call sign meaning: We Pass It On

Technical information
- Licensing authority: FCC
- Facility ID: 21787
- Class: C3
- ERP: 7,100 watts
- HAAT: 102 meters (335 ft)
- Translator: 93.5 W228BK (Union Park)

Links
- Public license information: Public file; LMS
- Website: noncomradio.net

WPIO is a Christian radio station licensed to Titusville, Florida, broadcasting on 89.3 FM. The station is owned by Florida Public Radio, Inc.

== Simulcast ==
WPIO is simulcast in the areas of Dade City, Florida and Bushnell, Florida on 89.3 WKFA.

Call sign	Frequency	City of license	FID	ERP (W)	HAAT	Class	FCC info
WKFA	89.3 FM	St. Catherine, Florida	89697	3,900	98 m (322 ft)	A	LMS
