= WELE =

- Ormond Beach, Florida; United States
- Broadcast area: Daytona Beach metropolitan area
- Frequency: 1380 kHz
- Branding: 1380 The Cat

Programming
- Format: Progressive talk radio
- Affiliations: Associated Press; Westwood One; Bethune-Cookman Wildcats

Ownership
- Owner: Bethune-Cookman University
- Sister stations: WRWS-LP

History
- First air date: August 1, 1957
- Former call signs: WQXQ (1957–1969); WDAT (1969–1986)

Technical information
- Licensing authority: FCC
- Facility ID: 72937
- Class: B
- Power: 5,000 watts (day); 2,500 watts (night)
- Transmitter coordinates: 29°16′9.00″N 81°4′54.00″W
- Translator: 101.5 W268DG (Ormond Beach)

Links
- Public license information: Public file; LMS
- Website: wele1380thecat.com

WELE (1380 AM) is a commercial radio station licensed to Ormond Beach, Florida, and serving the Daytona Beach metropolitan area. Owned by Bethune-Cookman University, the station carries a progressive talk radio format branded as "1380 The Cat".

Programming is also heard on 10-watt FM translator W268DG at 101.5 MHz.

== History ==
On August 1, 1957, the station first signed on the air. It originally held the call sign WQXQ. It was a daytimer, with a power of 1,000 watts and required to go off the air at sunset. Seeking identification with its target area, in 1969 the call sign was changed to WDAT. The DAT stood for Daytona.

Nighttime operations were added in 1973, running 1,000 watts around the clock. In 1977, the station's daytime power was increased to 5,000 watts, and its nighttime power was increased to 2,500 watts. Its call sign was changed to WELE in 1986.

In October 2013, Wings Communications donated the station's license to Bethune-Cookman University. The donation was consummated on August 5, 2014.

== Programming ==
WELE carries a number of nationally syndicated talk shows, including Russ Parr, Stephanie Miller and Democracy Now. WELE also broadcasts Bethune-Cookman University football and NFL games during the football season. World and national news is supplied by CBS News Radio.
