= WTYS-FM =

- Marianna, Florida; United States
- Broadcast area: Dothan, Alabama
- Frequency: 94.1 MHz

Programming
- Format: Gospel music

Ownership
- Owner: James L. Adams, Jr.
- Sister stations: WTYS (AM)

History
- First air date: August 4, 1995 (as WSEJ)
- Former call signs: WSEJ (1991–1996); WBNF (1996–1997)

Technical information
- Licensing authority: FCC
- Facility ID: 29697
- Class: A
- ERP: 4,400 watts
- HAAT: 117 meters
- Transmitter coordinates: 30°45′47.00″N 85°13′52.00″W

Links
- Public license information: Public file; LMS
- Website: wtys.cc

WTYS-FM (94.1 FM) is a radio station broadcasting a Southern gospel format. WTYS-FM is licensed to serve the community of Marianna, Florida, United States. The station is currently owned by James L. Adams, Jr.

== History ==
The station was assigned the call letters WSEJ on 1991-07-26. On 1996-05-22, the station changed its call sign to WBNF then on 1999-09-13 changed to the current WTYS.
