= WDSP =

Radio station in DeFuniak Springs, Florida

- DeFuniak Springs, Florida; United States
- Broadcast area: Fort Walton Beach, Florida
- Frequency: 1280 kHz
- Branding: AM 1280

Programming
- Format: Independent music

Ownership
- Owner: The SportzMax, Inc.

History
- First air date: 1956
- Last air date: June 9, 2021
- Former call signs: WDSP (1956–1969); WGTX (1969–2006)
- Call sign meaning: DeFuniak Springs

Technical information
- Licensing authority: FCC
- Facility ID: 60812
- Class: D
- Power: 5,000 watts (day); 46 watts (night)
- Transmitter coordinates: 30°42′41″N 86°6′25″W

Links
- Public license information: Public file; LMS

WDSP (1280 AM) was a radio station licensed to DeFuniak Springs, Florida, United States, serving the Walton County, area, with a commercial-free format of independent music. The station was last owned by The SportzMax, Inc.

== History ==
WDSP was founded in 1956 by W.D. "Cooter" Douglass and his wife, Marie. After spending several years broadcasting as WGTX, the station was reassigned the WDSP call letters by the Federal Communications Commission (FCC) in 1969.

LaVernie (Vern) Foster Jr., was hired by Mr. and Mrs. Douglas as manager of WDSP in 1957. The studios were at 30 South 8th Street, the current location of Peck Cawthon Insurance Agency.

After serving in World War II in the United States Army Air Corps, in the Chemical Corps, Vern Foster attended Trade School in Gadsden, Alabama where he received his certification in Broadcast Radio. He initially worked at WELR in Roanoke, Alabama, as an announcer and technician.

After moving to Florida to manage WDSP, Vern Foster became an avid golfer and was the Club Champion at the DeFuniak Springs Golf Course on more than one occasion. He was also an accomplished fisherman, hunter and marksman.

During the cold war and threat of nuclear attack from the U.S.S.R. in the early 1960s, Vern oversaw the construction of a bomb shelter/civil defense broadcast center, which was located in the back yard of his residence where the transmitter and tower for WDSP was located at the intersection of South 2nd Street and Bruce Avenue.

Vern Foster died in a single car crash on February 19, 1966, near the Forestry Service Fire Watch Tower located on Highway 90 about 3 miles (4.8 km) east of DeFuniak Springs. Not long after his death, the radio station changed ownership and the WDSP call sign was changed to WGTX. The studio of WGTX was relocated to the bomb shelter facility in the late 1960s where it remained for years.

The station was reassigned its original WDSP call sign by the FCC on February 25, 2006. Its license was cancelled and the call sign deleted by the FCC on March 30, 2023, due to the station apparently having been silent since June 9, 2021.
