= WGRO =

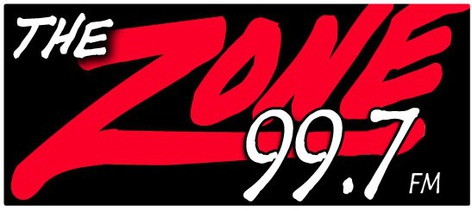
- Lake City, Florida; United States
- Broadcast area: White Springs, Florida; Fort White, Florida
- Frequency: 960 kHz

Ownership
- Owner: Fred Dockins; (Dockins Broadcast Group, LLC)

History
- First air date: November 14, 1958
- Last air date: February 7, 2024

Technical information
- Licensing authority: FCC
- Facility ID: 72125
- Class: B
- Power: 500 watts (day); 1,000 watts (night)
- Transmitter coordinates: 30°11′47″N 82°40′48″W
- Translator: 99.7 W259CU (Lake City)

Links
- Public license information: Public file; LMS

WGRO (960 AM) was a radio station in Lake City, Florida, owned by Fred Dockins, through licensee Dockins Broadcast Group, LLC.

Dockins surrendered WGRO's license for cancellation on February 7, 2024. It was reinstated on February 16, 2024. The Federal Communications Commission cancelled the station's license on June 17, 2024.

== FM translator ==
WGRO simulcasted its programming on an FM translator, which provided improved coverage, better sound and afforded listeners the choice of FM.

Broadcast translator for WGRO
Call sign	Frequency	City of license	FID	ERP (W)	Class	FCC info
W259CU	99.7 FM	Lake City, Florida	146781	250	D	LMS

The W259CU license was cancelled concurrently with the WGRO license.
