= WFSH (AM) =

- Valparaiso-Niceville, Florida; United States
- Broadcast area: Fort Walton Beach, Florida
- Frequency: 1340 kHz

Ownership
- Owner: Flagship Communications, Inc.

History
- First air date: 1959
- Last air date: March 2009
- Former call signs: WNSM (1959–1967)

Technical information
- Facility ID: 4128
- Class: C
- Power: 1,000 watts unlimited
- Transmitter coordinates: 30°30′34.7″N 86°28′33.8″W

WFSH (1340 AM) was a radio station licensed to Valparaiso-Niceville, Florida, United States. The station served the Fort Walton Beach area. WFSH was last owned by Flagship Communications, Inc. The station had a sports radio format and featured programming from ESPN Radio prior to going off the air in March 2009 due to economic problems.
