= WYBT =

- Blountstown, Florida; United States
- Broadcast area: Panama City area
- Frequency: 1000 kHz
- Branding: WYBT 98.1 FM - AM 1000

Programming
- Format: Oldies

Ownership
- Owner: WYBT, LLC

History
- First air date: 1962
- Former call signs: WKMK (1962–1986)
- Call sign meaning: W Y BlountsTown

Technical information
- Licensing authority: FCC
- Facility ID: 5891
- Class: D
- Power: 5,000 watts daytime only
- Transmitter coordinates: 30°27′15.00″N 85°2′32.00″W
- Translator: 98.1 W251BM (Blountstown)

Links
- Public license information: Public file; LMS
- Webcast: Listen Live

WYBT (1000 AM) is a radio station broadcasting an oldies format. It is licensed to Blountstown, Florida, United States, and serves the Panama City area. The station is owned by WYBT, LLC.

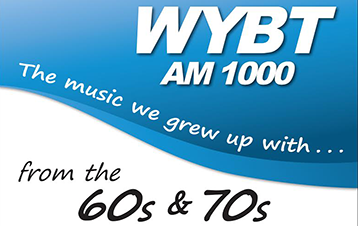
WYBT Previous Logo
