= WPRY-FM =

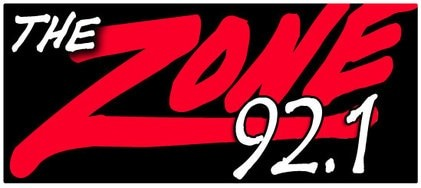
- Perry, Florida; United States
- Broadcast area: Tallahassee area
- Frequency: 92.1 MHz
- Branding: 92.1 The Zone

Programming
- Format: Classic rock

Ownership
- Owner: Fred Dockins; (Dockins Communications, Inc.)
- Sister stations: WFDZ

History
- First air date: December 1989 (as WNFK)
- Last air date: February 2026
- Former call signs: WPCI (1985–1986); WNFK (1986–2024)
- Former frequencies: 105.5 MHz (1989–1996)
- Call sign meaning: Perry

Technical information
- Licensing authority: FCC
- Facility ID: 54918
- Class: A
- ERP: 6,000 watts
- HAAT: 78 meters (256 ft)
- Transmitter coordinates: 30°5′18″N 83°29′46″W

Links
- Public license information: Public file; LMS
- Website: dockinsbroadcastgroup.weebly.com/stations.html

WPRY-FM (92.1 FM) was a radio station broadcasting a classic rock format. Licensed to Perry, Florida, United States, the station served the Tallahassee area. The station was owned by Fred Dockins, through licensee Dockins Communications, Inc.

== History ==
The station was assigned the call sign WPCI on August 14, 1985. On June 16, 1986, the station changed its call sign to WNFK; it signed on in December 1989. It became WPRY-FM on January 17, 2024.

In February 2026, WPRY-FM went off the air and turned in its license to the Federal Communications Commission.
