= WQLC =

Radio station in Watertown–Lake City, Florida

- Watertown, Florida; United States
- Broadcast area: Lake City, Florida
- Frequency: 102.1 MHz
- Branding: Power Country 102

Programming
- Format: Country music

Ownership
- Owner: Fred Dockins; (Dockins Broadcast Group, LLC)

History
- First air date: 1990

Technical information
- Licensing authority: FCC
- Facility ID: 38491
- Class: C3
- ERP: 9,000 watts
- HAAT: 162 meters (531 ft)
- Transmitter coordinates: 30°02′56″N 82°48′44″W

Links
- Public license information: Public file; LMS
- Website: www.powercountry102.com

WQLC (102.1 FM) is a country music formatted radio station primarily serving the Lake City, Florida, area, owned by Fred Dockins, through licensee Dockins Broadcast Group, LLC.
