= WAGE (FM) =

Dogwood Lakes Estate, Florida; United States
- Broadcast area: Chipley, Florida
- Frequency: 91.1 MHz

Programming
- Format: Southern gospel)

Ownership
- Owner: Florida Panhandle Technical College
- Operator: Bethany Divinity College & Seminary

History
- First air date: 1983
- Last air date: 2012
- Former call signs: WJED (1989–2013)

Technical information
- Licensing authority: FCC
- Facility ID: 4950
- Class: A
- ERP: 700 watts
- HAAT: 55 meters (180 ft)
- Transmitter coordinates: 30°51′34.6″N 85°47′44.7″W

Links
- Public license information: Public file; LMS

WAGE (91.1 FM) was a non-profit American radio station broadcasting a Christian radio format. The station was licensed by the Federal Communications Commission (FCC) to serve the community of Dogwood Lakes Estate, Florida.

The station was licensed to Florida Panhandle Technical College in Chipley, and operated by the Bethany Divinity College & Seminary of Dothan, Alabama. The programming focus of the station was southern gospel music, as a satellite of Bethany Divinity's WVOB in Dothan.

WAGE's license was cancelled by the FCC on March 31, 2015, due to having been silent for more than twelve months (since sometime in 2012).
