= WCFI (Florida) =

Commercial radio station in Ocala, Florida

DWCFI
Ocala, Florida; United States
- Broadcast area: Gainesville-Ocala, Florida
- Frequency: 1290 kHz

Programming
- Format: Defunct

Ownership
- Owner: Vector Communications

Technical information
- Class: B
- Power: 5,000 watts

WCFI was a commercial radio station in Ocala, Florida, broadcasting to the Gainesville-Ocala, Florida area on 1290 AM. WCFI broadcast news and talk programming, along with country music. The station's slogan was "News, Information, and Real Country". WCFI's transmitter tower was severely damaged during the 2004 hurricane season, and the station has been off the air since August 2004. On February 20, 2008, the FCC license for the station was deleted.
