= WTYS (AM) =

- Marianna, Florida; United States
- Broadcast area: Dothan, Alabama
- Frequency: 1340 kHz
- Branding: Real Country 1340

Programming
- Format: Country/Bluegrass

Ownership
- Owner: James L. Adams, Jr.
- Sister stations: WTYS-FM

Technical information
- Facility ID: 72512
- Class: C
- Power: 780 watts
- Transmitter coordinates: 30°45′48.70″N 85°13′51.70″W
- Translator: (104.3 MHz) W282CM (Marianna)

Links
- Webcast: Listen Live
- Website: wtysradio.com

WTYS (1340 AM) is a radio station broadcasting a bluegrass and country music format. Licensed to Marianna, Florida, United States. The station is currently owned by James L. Adams Jr.
