= WXOF =

- Yankeetown, Florida; United States
- Broadcast area: Crystal River - Homosassa Springs
- Frequency: 96.7 MHz
- Branding: 96.7 The Fox

Programming
- Format: Classic rock
- Affiliations: Westwood One

Ownership
- Owner: WGUL-FM, Inc.

History
- First air date: April 20, 1998; 27 years ago (as WAZN at 96.3)
- Former call signs: WAZN (4/1998-7/1998); WBKX (1998–1999)
- Former frequencies: 96.3 MHz (1998–2012)
- Call sign meaning: XOF = FOX spelled backwards

Technical information
- Licensing authority: FCC
- Facility ID: 47881
- Class: C3
- ERP: 14,500 watts
- HAAT: 132 meters (433 ft)
- Transmitter coordinates: 29°1′18.00″N 82°41′20.00″W

Links
- Public license information: Public file; LMS
- Webcast: Listen live
- Website: thefox967.com

WXOF (96.7 MHz) is a commercial FM radio station licensed to Yankeetown, Florida. It airs a classic rock format and is owned by WGUL-FM, Inc. It sometimes describes itself on the air as "classic hits" but it plays popular classic rock tracks, mostly from the 1970s and 80s, with no pop or dance songs. The studios are on South Crystal Glen Drive in Lecanto.

== History ==
The station went on the air as WAZN on April 20, 1998. On July 10, 1998, the station changed its call sign to WBKX, then on January 11, 1999 to the current WXOF. Before switching to classic hits, it was a country music station.

On December 7, 2012 WXOF upgraded its signal by moving from 96.3 FM to 96.7 FM and raising effective radiated power from 3,500 watts to 14,500 watts.
