= WGRV-LP =

- Melbourne, Florida; United States
- Broadcast area: Melbourne; Indian River
- Frequency: 93.1 MHz

Ownership
- Owner: Brevard Youth Education Broadcasting Corporation

History
- First air date: April 5, 2005
- Last air date: March 25, 2013
- Former call signs: WCEE-LP (2002–2005); WGRZ-LP (2005–2007)
- Call sign meaning: "Groove"

Technical information
- Licensing authority: FCC
- Facility ID: 135636
- Class: L1
- ERP: 39 watts
- HAAT: 47.2 meters (155 ft)
- Transmitter coordinates: 28°5′6″N 80°34′2.1″W

Links
- Public license information: LMS

WGRV-LP (93.1 FM) was a radio station consisting of a series of low power transmitters throughout the Brevard/Indian River area of Florida. This non-commercial station broadcast a smooth jazz format supported by its listeners. The station was licensed to Melbourne, Florida, United States, and served the Melbourne area. The station was owned by Brevard Youth Education Broadcasting Corporation. The station was a network of low power transmitters in the Brevard area broadcasting on 93.1 (WGRV-LP), 103.3 Palm Bay, 103.3 in the Cocoa Beach area, 102.3 in the Cape Canaveral area and 100.7 FM in the Rockledge area.

== History ==
The station was originally assigned the call sign WCEE-LP on June 18, 2002. On March 31, 2005, the station changed its call sign to WGRZ-LP. On March 12, 2007, it changed again to WGRV-LP.

As of March 25, 2013, the station went off the air and had filed for special temporary authority to remain dark for six months. As of November 9, 2013, WGRV-LP remained silent, with no immediate plans to resume broadcasting. The station was listed in the Federal Communications Commission (FCC) database as "licensed and silent". According to a message on the station's web site, the station was off the air indefinitely due to life changes and health issues among the station's key staff.

WGRV-LP's call sign was deleted and its license cancelled by the FCC on June 24, 2014. The record can be viewed using the FCC's CDBS station search tool using the call letters DWGRV-LP. The "D" at the front stands for "deleted". The FM translators that were part of the network are still licensed, but since they have also been silent for more than a year, the law requires that the FCC delete them as well unless they have switched inputs and are rebroadcasting another station.

== Awards ==
The station was nominated for the Smooth Jazz Radio Station Of The Year by Radio and Records magazine in 2006 and 2007.

== Translators ==
Call sign	Frequency	City of license	FID	ERP (W)	Class	FCC info
W300BQ	(107.9 FM) FM	Vero Beach, Florida	139428	250	D	LMS
