= WFDZ =

Coordinates: 30°6′27″N 83°34′0″W

- Perry, Florida; United States
- Broadcast area: Tallahassee, Florida
- Frequency: 93.5 MHz
- Branding: Froggy 93.5

Programming
- Format: Country music

Ownership
- Owner: Dockins Communications, Inc.

History
- First air date: 2009

Technical information
- Licensing authority: FCC
- Facility ID: 170183
- Class: C3
- ERP: 19,000 watts
- HAAT: 100 meters (330 ft)

Links
- Public license information: Public file; LMS

WFDZ (93.5 FM) is a radio station licensed to Perry, Florida. The station broadcasts a country music format and is owned by Dockins Communications, Inc.
