= Jim Schwartzel =

American politician (born 1976)

Member-elect of the U.S. House of Representatives from Florida's 19th district
- Assuming office January 3, 2027
- Succeeding: Byron Donalds

Personal details
- Born: April 23, 1976 (age 50) Naples, Florida, U.S.
- Party: Republican
- Spouse: Carly
- Children: 2
- Education: Stetson University (BA)

James William Schwartzel (born April 23, 1976) is an American politician and businessman from Florida. He is the Member-elect of the United States House of Representatives for Florida's 19th congressional district. He will succeed Byron Donalds, who retired to run successfully for Governor of Florida.

== Early life and broadcasting career ==
Schwartzel was born on April 23, 1976, in Naples, Florida. He grew up in Naples and attended Bishop Verot High School in Fort Myers. After high school, Schwartzel earned a Bachelor of Arts in business and finance from Stetson University in 1998. He worked as an intern for Florida Congressmen Connie Mack III and Porter Gross.

Schwartzel later entered broadcasting, and in 2011, he began running the Sun Broadcasting company, taking over his father's business. Originally a radio company, he grew the company to having a presence in print media and television as well. He is the owner of radio stations WFSX-FM, WHEL (Trump Country 93.7), and WRXK-FM, and television stations WFTX-TV, WXCW, WUVF-LD, and WLZE. Schwartzel also owns Gulshore Life Media, which he acquired in 2018, and The Naples Press newspaper.

Schwartzel is married and has two children.

== U.S. House of Representatives ==
In 2023, Schwartzel was honored by the First Amendment Foundation as the recipient of the Pete Weitzel Friend of the First Amendment Award, for his efforts to oppose a bill regarding defamation that was proposed in the Florida Legislature. The bill did not pass.

In April 2025, Schwartzel launched his campaign as a Republican for the United States House of Representatives for Florida's 19th congressional district, seeking to succeed Byron Donalds who entered the gubernatorial race. He faced nine others in the Republican primary, including former U.S. Representatives Madison Cawthorn and Chris Collins, and U.S. Department of Commerce advisor Catalina Lauf, who was endorsed by President Donald Trump. On August 19, 2026, Schwartzel won the primary with 29.1% of the vote, ahead of Lauf, who finished second with 22.0%. He faced Democratic Party candidate Victor Arias in the general election, and won the election.

Schwartzel describes himself a "'Trump conservative' who supports limited government, low taxes and a strong defense".
