= WXKB =

Contemporary hit radio station in Cape Coral, Florida

Coordinates: 26.423°N 81.630°W

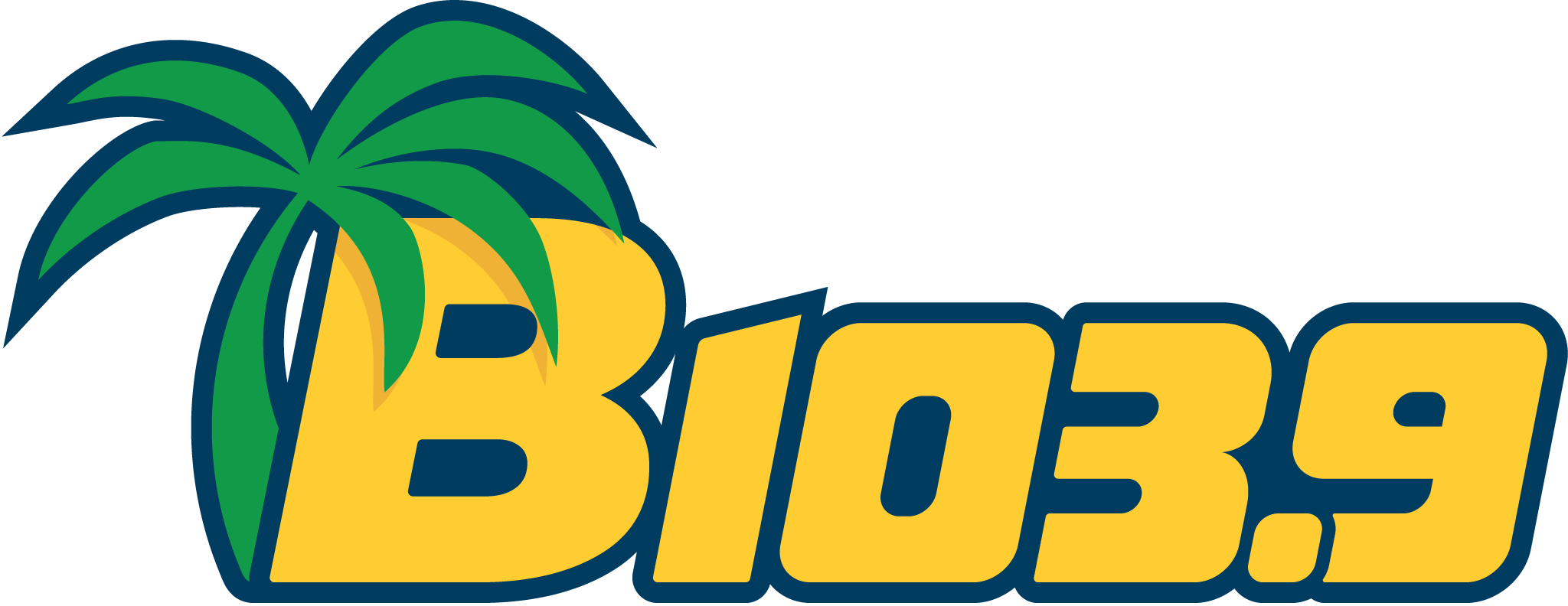
- Cape Coral, Florida; United States
- Broadcast area: Fort Myers–Naples–; Southwest Florida
- Frequency: 103.9 MHz (HD Radio)
- Branding: B103.9

Programming
- Language: English
- Format: Contemporary hit radio
- Affiliations: Compass Media Networks; Premiere Networks

Ownership
- Owner: Sun Broadcasting, Inc.
- Sister stations: WARO; WFFY; WFSX-FM; WFTX-TV; WHEL; WRXK-FM; WXCW

History
- First air date: 1975
- Former call signs: WRCC (1975–1990); WAKS (1990–1993)
- Former frequencies: 103.7 MHz (1990–1993)

Technical information
- Licensing authority: FCC
- Facility ID: 73933
- Class: C
- ERP: 100,000 watts
- HAAT: 341 meters (1,119 ft)
- Translators: HD2: 96.5 W243BM (Suncoast Estates); HD2: 101.5 W268AH (Bonita Springs); HD2: 105.1 W286AK (Naples)

Links
- Public license information: Public file; LMS
- Webcast: Listen live
- Website: b1039.com

WXKB (103.9 FM) is a commercial radio station licensed to Cape Coral, Florida, and serving the Fort Myers-Naples radio market and Southwest Florida. WXKB is owned by Sun Broadcasting, Inc. and airs a contemporary hit radio format branded as "B-103.9". In afternoon drive time it carries On Air with Ryan Seacrest, syndicated by Premiere Networks.

WXKB has studios and offices on South Tamiami Trail in Estero. The transmitter is off Carter Road, also in Estero. WXKB broadcasts using HD Radio technology. The digital subchannel feeds FM translator stations W243BM in Suncoast Estates at 96.5 MHz, W268AH in Bonita Springs at 101.5 MHz and W286AK in Naples at 105.1 MHz,

== History ==
The station first signed on in 1975 as WRCC. Originally it was powered with 3,000 watts as a Class A station. It has since boosted its power to 100,000 watts as a Class C station. WRCC carried a classical music format.

The station had several format changes throughout the years. From 1981 until 1984, the station ran an easy listening, middle of the road (MOR) format. From 1984 until 1990, it played adult contemporary music.

In 1990, its call sign was changed to WAKS. The frequency moved one notch to 103.7 FM and it began running a classic rock format. This lasted until 1993, when the station returned to its 103.9 frequency, changed its call sign to WXKB, and it flipped to CHR hits. This was shortly after competitor 96.9 WINK-FM dropped CHR for hot adult contemporary during the same year.

On August 12, 2025, Beasley Media Group announced that it would sell its Fort Myers cluster, with half going to Sun Broadcasting for $9 million After approving a waiver allowing Sun to own more stations in the market than permitted under current FCC rules, the deal closed in February 2026.

== HD Radio ==
On July 9, 2021, WXKB-HD2 began broadcasting a classic hip hop format, branded as "96.5/101.5 The Bounce". It is simulcast on FM translators W243BM at 96.5 FM, W268AH at 101.5 FM and W286AK at 105.1 FM.

On September 22, 2023, WXKB-HD2 flipped to an all-podcast format, as part of Beasley's "Podcast Radio US" network.

In February 2026, WXKB's HD2 subchannel switched to a rebroadcast of the sports radio format on co-owned WBCN 770 AM.

As of October 2026, WXKB does offer any HD subchannels.
