= WAXA =

- Pine Island Center, Florida; United States
- Broadcast area: Fort Myers, Florida
- Frequency: 1200 kHz
- Branding: Maxima 97.3/95.7

Programming
- Format: Spanish tropical hits

Ownership
- Owner: Fort Myers Broadcasting Company
- Sister stations: WNPL; WINK-FM; WINK-TV; WTLQ-FM

History
- First air date: February 20, 1986
- Last air date: May 2021
- Former call signs: WDCQ (1986–1995); WTLQ (1995–1999); WINK (1999–2003); WPTK (2003–2010); WINK (2010–2013); WJUA (2013–2018)
- Call sign meaning: "Maxima"

Technical information
- Facility ID: 48329
- Class: B
- Power: 750 watts day and night
- Transmitter coordinates: 26°42′52″N 82°2′46″W
- Translator: 97.3 W247CR (Pine Island Center)
- Repeater: 1460 WNPL (Golden Gate)

Links
- Webcast: Listen live
- Website: musicaalmaximo.com

WAXA (1200 AM; "Maxima 97.3/95.7") was a radio station which broadcast a Spanish-language Tropical hits format. Licensed to Pine Island Center, Florida, United States, the station served the Fort Myers area. The station was last owned by Fort Myers Broadcasting Company.

== History ==
WAXA signed on February 20, 1986, as WDCQ, offering an oldies format. It had changed to a talk format by 1992. Fort Myers Broadcasting Company bought the station in 1995, with the sale not being completed until October 1996; soon afterward, the call letters were changed to WTLQ.

In 1999, the station swapped call letters with 1240 AM and became WINK; four years later, WINK was moved back to 1240, and 1200 became WPTK, offering a separate talk lineup from that offered on WINK. The format was changed to tropical music in October 2005, with some of WPTK's programming being absorbed into WINK's schedule. Another format change, this time to sports talk, followed in August 2008; programming was largely provided by Fox Sports Radio.

WNPL signed on in 2009 to improve the station's coverage in the southern end of the market.

Logo as "WINK News Radio"

An all-news format was adopted August 2, 2010. To reflect the "WINK News Radio" branding, the WINK call sign was again moved from 1240 AM (which became WFSX) on August 26.

On September 2, 2013, WINK dropped the news/talk format and adopted a Spanish adult hits format as "Juan 1200". "Juan" is basically the Spanish-language version of Jack FM, both distributed by SparkNet Communications. WINK also changed their callsign on September 3, 2013, to match the new format as WJUA.

On January 19, 2018, the station changed its call sign to WAXA. On January 22, 2018, WAXA rebranded as "Maxima 97.3/95.7". Fort Myers Broadcasting surrendered WAXA's license to the Federal Communications Commission, who cancelled the license on May 21, 2021. Due to that, "Maxima" moved to the second HD Radio channel of WINK-FM, continuing to simulcast on W247CR.

== Former programming ==
On weekdays from 6 a.m. to 10 p.m., WINK had an all-news format; the station also carried WINK-TV's 5 a.m., noon, and 6 p.m. newscasts. Originally locally produced, by February 2012 WINK's news blocks (outside of WINK-TV simulcasts) began to be supplied by the Talk Radio Network-produced America's Radio News Network.

Outside of its news blocks, the station carried the syndicated talk shows The Dave Ramsey Show, and Red Eye Radio. Weekend programming included WINK-TV's weekend morning newscasts, additional syndicated and brokered talk shows, Bloomberg Radio, and Meet the Press.

During its all-news programming, WINK used the resources of WINK-TV, The News-Press, and the Naples Daily News for local news. It also carried CNN Radio newscasts, as well as financial reports from MarketWatch.

The station aired Florida Gators football. WPTK served as the flagship station for the Florida Everblades ECHL hockey team during the 2009–2010 season; the station dropped the team after determining that Everblades coverage did not fit the "WINK News Radio" identity.

Other sports broadcasts carried by WPTK as a sports station include Florida State Seminoles football, South Florida Bulls football, the Tampa Bay Buccaneers (all now on WBCN), the Florida Firecats, and spring training games of the Minnesota Twins.
