= WFSX =

WFSX may refer to:

- WFSX-FM, a radio station (92.5 FM) licensed to Estero, Florida, United States
- WFSX (AM), a defunct radio station (1240 AM) formerly licensed to Fort Myers, Florida
