= WJBX =

WJBX may refer to:

- WZKZ, a radio station (1450 AM) in Bridgeport, Connecticut, United States, which held the WJBX call sign from 1985 to 1989
- WWCN, a radio station (99.3 FM) in Fort Myers Beach, Florida, United States, which held the WJBX call sign from 1992 to 2013
- WBCN (Florida), a radio station (770 AM) in North Fort Myers, Florida, which held the WJBX call sign from 2013 to 2021
- WBCN (North Carolina), a defunct radio station (1660 AM) in Charlotte, North Carolina, United States, which was assigned the WJBX call sign in 2021 and 2022
