= WREH =

- Cypress Quarters, Florida; United States
- Broadcast area: Okeechobee County, Florida
- Frequency: 90.5 MHz
- Branding: Reach FM

Programming
- Format: Religious

Ownership
- Owner: Reach Communications, Inc.

History
- First air date: 2004
- Last air date: February 10, 2017

Technical information
- Licensing authority: FCC
- Class: C1
- ERP: 100,000 watts
- HAAT: 76 meters (249 ft)
- Transmitter coordinates: 27.348°N 80.951°W

Links
- Public license information: Public file; LMS

WREH (Reach FM) was a 100,000-watt FM station, broadcasting on 90.5 MHz. Its city of license was Cypress Quarters in Okeechobee County, Florida. The station went on the air in 2004. Reach Communications, ReachFM's parent company, was formed in association with Calvary Chapel of Fort Lauderdale, Florida. When it was active, ReachFM's programming was geared towards a diverse active Christian audience. According to its website, WREH's last day of programming was March 30, 2016. On February 15, 2017, Reach Communications informed the Federal Communications Commission (FCC) that WREH had ceased broadcasting on February 10; on April 18, 2017, it surrendered the station's license, and the license was cancelled by the FCC on April 19, 2017.

== Translators ==
ReachFM was heard throughout the state of Florida on more than 40 translators:

Call sign	Frequency	City of license	FID	ERP (W)	Class	FCC info
W298AM	107.5 FM	Aurora, Florida		13	D	
W220DQ	91.9 FM	Belle Glade, Florida		13	D	
W241AX	96.1 FM	Boca Raton, Florida	138734	13	D	LMS
W246BT	97.1 FM	Clermont, Florida	151735	27	D	LMS
W275AX	102.9 FM	Fort Meade, Florida	148943	27	D	LMS
W244BJ	96.7 FM	Frostproof, Florida	138530	19	D	LMS
W282BG	104.3 FM	Grant, Florida		40	D	
W243AR	96.5 FM	Lehigh Acres, Florida		28	D	
W233AP	94.5 FM	Oakland Park, Florida	139105	27	D	LMS
W273BR	102.5 FM	Palm Coast, Florida		10	D	
W214BV	90.7 FM	Port Charlotte, Florida		10	D	
W236AO	95.1 FM	Port St. Lucie, Florida	146634	13	D	LMS
W244BK	96.7 FM	Twentymile Bend, Florida		80	D	
W220DZ	91.9 FM	Wesley Chapel, Florida		8	D	
W299AU	107.7 FM	Zolfo Springs, Florida		19	D	

The station's programming could also have been heard on four full-power FM radio digital subchannels in Florida:

- WWJK-HD2 107.3 Green Cove Springs (Jacksonville)
- WMGE-HD2 94.9 Miami - Fort Lauderdale
- WRUM-HD2 100.3 Orlando
- WKGR-HD2 98.7 Wellington (West Palm Beach)

== Sale of translators ==
It was announced on July 2, 2012 that Reach Communications was selling the following translators to Beasley Broadcasting for $150,000, which would serve as rebroadcasters for WWCN 770 ESPN:

Call sign	Frequency	City of license	FID	ERP (W)	Class	FCC info
W268AH	101.5 FM	Bonita Springs, Florida	138952	10	D	LMS
W251AL	98.1 FM	Fort Myers, Florida	139037	80	D	LMS
W286AK	105.1 FM	Naples, Florida	138900	19	D	LMS

These translators now serve as repeaters for WRXK-FM HD2 (going by the slogan The Link) along with the following translator:

Call sign	Frequency	City of license	FID	ERP (W)	Class	FCC info
W243BM	96.5 FM	Suncoast Estates, Florida	146788	26	D	LMS

Some translators were sold to Clear Channel (now iHeartMedia), which sparked rumors that Reach FM would sell all of its remaining translators to iHeartMedia.

- In Orlando, W283AN was sold to iHeartMedia and changed formats into an urban contemporary-formatted, "104.5 The Beat".
- In Tampa, 88.3 moved to 99.1 and became one of the affiliates for classic rock-formatted "Thunder Tampa Bay" along with W290BJ and W233AV, while 89.3 which moved to 99.9 became branded as "ALT 99.9" and converted to an alternative formatted station. However, after many complaints from WXJB, due to interference, W207BU switched frequencies from 99.9 to 100.3, and rebranded as alternative-formatted "ALT 100.3".
- In Miami, W228BV moved to 93.5 and converted into a country formatted station, "93.5 The Bull"

Call sign	Frequency	City of license	FID	ERP (W)	Class	FCC info
W283AN	104.5 FM	Altamonte Springs, Florida	149386	10	D	LMS
W202CB	(88.3 (now 99.1)) FM	Bayonet Point, Florida		27	D	
W207BU	(89.3 (now 100.3)) FM	Bayonet Point, Florida		10	D	
W228BV	(94.5 (now 93.5)) FM	Fort Lauderdale, Florida		80	D	
W233AV	94.5 FM	Gulfport, Florida	146121	10	D	LMS

One translator got sold to Beasley Media Group in November 2014 and became a repeater for WSBR on 740 AM.

Call sign	Frequency	City of license	FID	ERP (W)	Class	FCC info
W245BC	96.9 FM	Lauderdale Lakes, Florida	138625	67	D	LMS
