= WEVU =

WEVU may refer to:

- WEVU-CA, a defunct low-powered television station (channel 4) in Fort Myers, Florida, United States
- WZVN-TV, a television station (channel 26) licensed to serve Naples, Florida, which held the call sign WEVU from 1974 to 1995
