= WUVF-LD =

Television station in Naples, Florida

WUVF-LD and WLZE-LD
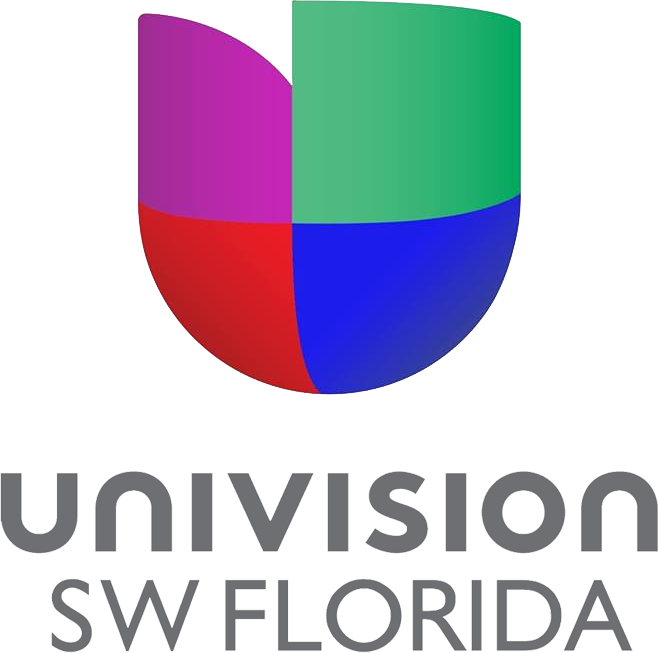

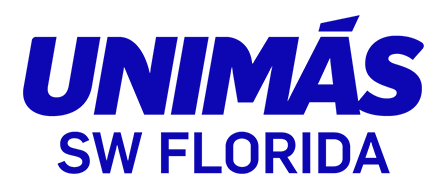

WUVF-LD: Naples, Florida; WLZE-LD: Fort Myers, Florida; United States
- Channels for WUVF-LD: Digital: 18 (UHF); Virtual: 2
- Channels for WLZE-LD: Digital: 27 (UHF); Virtual: 51
- Branding: Univision SW Florida; UniMás SW Florida (2.2/51.2)

Programming
- Affiliations: 2.1/51.1: Univision; 2.2/51.2: UniMás

Ownership
- Owner: Sun Broadcasting, Inc.
- Operator: Fort Myers Broadcasting Company
- Sister stations: WANA-LD, WFTX-TV, WINK-TV, WXCW

History
- Founded: WUVF-LD: November 8, 1995
- First air date: WUVF-LD: July 10, 1996; WLZE-LD: July 12, 1995
- Former call signs: WUVF-LD: W02CB (1995–1996, CP only); WTIG-LP (1996–2004); WSFU-CA (2004); WUVF-CA (2004–2009); WLZE-LD: JD0415TW (July 12, 1995); W65DF (July 12, 1995–1998); WLZE-LP (1998–2012)
- Call sign meaning: WUVF-LD: "Univision Florida"

Technical information
- Licensing authority: FCC
- Facility ID: WUVF-LD: 191422; WLZE-LD: 41376
- Class: LD
- ERP: 15 kW
- HAAT: WUVF-LD: 198.4 m (651 ft); WLZE-LD: 323.3 m (1,061 ft)
- Transmitter coordinates: WUVF-LD: 26°20′30″N 81°42′37.5″W; WLZE-LD: 26°48′2.8″N 81°45′44.3″W
- Translator: WXCW 46.3 Naples

Links
- Public license information: WUVF-LD: LMS
- Website: www.dlatinos.com/univision

WUVF-LD (channel 2) is a low-power television station licensed to Naples, Florida, United States, serving Southwest Florida as an affiliate of the Spanish-language networks Univision and UniMás. It is locally owned by Sun Broadcasting alongside Fox affiliate WFTX-TV (channel 36), CW affiliate WXCW (channel 46), and low-power WANA-LD (channel 16), and operated by Fort Myers Broadcasting Company with CBS/MyNetworkTV affiliate WINK-TV (channel 11). The stations share studios on Corporate Lakes Drive in Gateway; WUVF-LD's transmitter is located on Channel 30 Drive (on a tower shared with several radio stations).

WLZE-LD (channel 51) in Fort Myers operates as a translator of WUVF-LD; this station's transmitter is located north of Fort Myers Shores near the Charlotte–Lee county line.

== History ==
On April 4, 2008, Equity Media Holdings announced the sale of all five of its Southwest Florida stations (including WUVF and WLZE) to Luken Communications for $8 million. Equity has cited corporate financial losses as a reason for the sale. Equity Media Holdings filed for Chapter 11 bankruptcy in December 2008; offers by Luken Communications to acquire Equity-owned stations in six markets were later withdrawn.

WUVF and WLZE were sold at auction to private equity firm Silver Point Capital on April 16, 2009. The sale was finalized on August 17, 2009. Following the purchase, WUVF surrendered its Class A classification.

WLZE began to be carried on Dish Network on October 7, 2009; the satellite provider had earlier obtained WUVF's programming via sister station WEVU-CA (channel 4), which had served as a WUVF satellite since 2006 (and simulcast the 6 p.m. newscast for some time before adding the remainder of WUVF's schedule), that station was taken silent on August 14, 2009—three days before the completion of the sale to Silver Point. SP Television reached a deal to sell WUVF and WLZE to Media Vista Group on December 21, 2012.

On April 1, 2019, Media Vista Group announced that it was selling its stations, including WUVF-LD, to Sun Broadcasting, Inc. for $9.75 million. The sale was completed on July 1, 2019.

== Newscasts ==
During the mid-2000s, after joining Univision, WUVF began airing half-hour Spanish-language local newscasts at 6 and 11 p.m. The broadcasts were produced out of Equity Media's headquarters in Little Rock, Arkansas, with news reports filed by reporters based in Southwest Florida. The newscasts were canceled in June 2008, after Equity instituted a companywide suspension of news programs as a cost-cutting measure. Local news returned to the station in 2013 as part of the D'Latinos program, produced and aired locally by Media Vista.

== Subchannels ==
The station's signal is multiplexed:

Subchannels of WUVF-LD and WLZE-LD
Subchannel		Res.	Short name	Programming
WUVF-LD	WLZE-LD	Res.	Short name	Programming
2.1	51.1	1080i	WLZE-LD	Univision
2.2	51.2	720p	WLZE-S1	UniMás
2.3	51.3	Audio only	97.7	Simulcast of WTLQ-FM
2.5	51.5	Audio only	97.3	Simulcast of WINK-FM-HD2
