= WARO =

- Naples, Florida; United States
- Broadcast area: Southwest Florida; Fort Myers
- Frequency: 94.5 MHz
- Branding: 94.5 The Arrow

Programming
- Format: Classic rock

Ownership
- Owner: Sun Broadcasting, Inc.
- Sister stations: WFFY; WFSX-FM; WFTX-TV; WHEL; WRXK-FM; WXCW; WXKB

History
- First air date: May 8, 1962 (as WNFM)
- Former call signs: WNFM (1962-1973); WCVU (1973–1994); WRAO (8/1994-10/1994)
- Call sign meaning: "Arrow"

Technical information
- Licensing authority: FCC
- Facility ID: 66224
- Class: C0
- ERP: 100,000 watts
- HAAT: 309 meters (1,014 ft)
- Transmitter coordinates: 26°20′30.3″N 81°42′37.3″W

Links
- Public license information: Public file; LMS
- Website: 945thearrow.com

WARO (94.5 FM "Arrow 94.5") is a commercial radio station licensed to Naples, Florida, and broadcasting to the Fort Myers-Naples area of Southwest Florida. It is owned by Sun Broadcasting and it airs a classic rock radio format. The studios and offices are on Palm Beach Boulevard (Florida State Road 80) in Fort Myers, near the Caloosahatchee River.

WARO is a Class C0 FM station. It has an effective radiated power (ERP) of 100,000 watts, the maximum for most FM stations. The transmitter is on Radio Tower Road in Bonita Springs, east of Interstate 75.

== History ==
=== Beautiful music ===
The station signed on the air on May 8, 1962. Its original call sign was WNFM and it was the FM sister station to WNOG 1270 AM (now deleted). WNFM and WNOG were owned by Radio Naples, Inc. WNFM was only powered at 5,400 watts, a fraction of its current output. That limited its signal to Naples and adjacent communities.

At first, WNFM mostly simulcast the programming on WNOG. After a few years, it began airing its own automated beautiful music format, playing quarter-hour sweeps of soft instrumental music. In 1969, WNOG and WNFM were acquired by Palmer Broadcasting. By the 1970s, WNFM got a boost in power to 100,000 watts. It changed its call letters to WCVU, standing for "Sea View" but not related to today's WCVU 104.9, owned by iHeartMedia.

=== Soft AC, 1970s hits, classic rock ===
By the 1980s, the easy listening format was aging. The station added more soft vocals and cut back on instrumentals. It eventually made the transition to soft adult contemporary. In the early 1990s, management decided to flip 94.5 FM to all-1970s hits.

In 1994, the format evolved to a mix of 1960s, 1970s and early 1980s classic hits and classic rock. The station changed its call letters, first to WRAO, then two months later to WARO. WARO called itself "Arrow 94.5" which stood for "All Rock and Roll Oldies". This lasted until approximately 2003 when the format moved to a mainstream classic rock sound.

In 1996, WNOG and WCVU were acquired by Meridian Broadcasting, Inc. On January 27, 2012, Meridian Broadcasting changed its name to Sun Broadcasting, Inc.
