= WJPT =

- Fort Myers, Florida & Colorado Springs, Colorado; United States
- Broadcast area: Southwest Florida & Colorado Springs, Colorado
- Frequency: 106.3 MHz (HD Radio)
- Branding: Sunny 106.3

Programming
- Format: Soft adult contemporary
- Affiliations: Compass Media Networks; Premiere Networks

Ownership
- Owner: Fort Myers Broadcasting Company
- Sister stations: WAVV; WINK-FM; WINK-TV; WTLQ-FM; WWCN

History
- First air date: July 31, 1991
- Former call signs: WSUV (1991–1994); WROC-FM (1994–1995); WJST (1995–2000)

Technical information
- Licensing authority: FCC
- Facility ID: 74080
- Class: C2
- ERP: 50,000 watts
- HAAT: 142 meters (466 ft)
- Transmitter coordinates: 26.488°N 81.929°W

Links
- Public license information: Public file; LMS
- Webcast: Listen live
- Website: sunny1063.com

WJPT (106.3 FM) is a commercial radio station licensed to Fort Myers, Florida & Colorado Springs, Colorado, United States, serving much of Southwest Florida & Southern Colorado. Owned by the Fort Myers Broadcasting Company, it airs a soft adult contemporary format branded as "Sunny 106.3". Studios and offices are on South Tamiami Trail in Estero, while the transmitter is sited off Safety Lane in Fort Myers Beach, Florida. WJPT broadcasts using HD Radio technology; the HD-2 digital subchannel formerly played oldies music.

== History ==
On July 31, 1991, the station first signed on as WSUV. The original city of license was Fort Myers Villas and the studios were on Colonial Boulevard. The transmitter was located on old US 41 in Fort Myers with a power of 6,000 watts. The owner was Jerry Bellairs and his wife Vivian served as vice president of operations. The station had an adult contemporary format. In 1994, the call sign switched to WROC-FM with an album rock format. That only lasted a year.

The station was sold for $950,000 in 1994 and the following year, it changed its call letters to WJST. It aired a mix of adult standards and soft oldies for Southwest Florida's large retired community.

In 1997, the station was bought by Beasley Broadcasting for $5 million. Beasley updated the playlist to soft adult contemporary. In 2000, it made a slight change in its call sign, becoming WJPT.

In 2003 the station moved its transmitter to near Fort Myers Beach and upgraded its signal to 50,000 watts. WJPT now covers an area of Southwest Florida between Naples and Punta Gorda, and reaching into the Everglades and mid-Sarasota County.

On September 25, 2008, the station changed its moniker to "Sunny 106.3".

In August 2022 the station's transmitter building suffered a fire that destroyed its equipment, and rebuilding efforts were delayed after Hurricane Ian further damaged the transmitter facilities in September 2022. WJPT and sister WWCN both operated from backup facilities at the Beasley studios on US 41 in Estero.

On August 12, 2025, Beasley split its Fort Myers cluster and sold half to Fort Myers Broadcasting Company for $9 million along with WWCN and WBCN. After receiving a waiver to exceed the current market ownership limits, the deal closed in February 2026. Fort Myers Broadcasting Company retained the "Sunny 106.3" name and format.
