= WNFM =

WNFM may refer to:

- WNFM (TV), the fictional callsign of a cable-only television station (channel 8, off the air) in Fort Myers, Florida, United States
- WNFM (FM), a radio station (104.9 FM) licensed to Reedsburg, Wisconsin, United States
