= WDEO =

WDEO may refer to:

- WDEO (AM), a radio station (990 AM) licensed to serve Ypsilanti, Michigan, United States
- WFFY, a radio station (98.5 FM) licensed to serve San Carlos Park, Florida, United States, which held the call sign WDEO-FM from 2007 to 2014
- WLBY, a radio station (1290 AM) licensed to serve Saline, Michigan, which held the call sign WDEO in 1999
