= WFFY =

Coordinates: 26.505°N 81.854°W

- San Carlos Park, Florida; United States
- Broadcast area: Fort Myers; Naples
- Frequency: 98.5 MHz
- Branding: Fly 98.5

Programming
- Format: Rhythmic contemporary
- Affiliations: Premiere Networks; United Stations Radio Networks

Ownership
- Owner: Sun Broadcasting Inc.
- Sister stations: WARO; WFSX-FM; WFTX-TV; WHEL; WRXK-FM; WXCW; WXKB

History
- First air date: 1986
- Former call signs: WRWX (1986–1995); WDRR (1995–2003); WNRW (2003–2004); WUSV (2004–2007); WDEO-FM (2007–2014); WLVO (2014–2017); WKHW (2017)

Technical information
- Licensing authority: FCC
- Facility ID: 58276
- Class: C2
- ERP: 50,000 watts
- HAAT: 117 meters (384 ft)

Links
- Public license information: Public file; LMS
- Website: fly985.com

WFFY (98.5 FM) is a commercial radio station licensed to San Carlos Park, Florida, United States, and broadcasting to the Fort Myers media market. It airs a rhythmic contemporary format and is owned by Sun Broadcasting, with studios on Palm Beach Boulevard in Fort Myers.

WFFY's transmitter is sited off of Old U.S. Route 41 in San Carlos Park.

== History ==
=== Early years ===
The station began as a construction permit for a 3,000 watt station licensed to and located on Sanibel, Florida, with the call letters WRWX. The allocation was modified a few times before signing on in 1996 from its current site and licensed to San Carlos Park as WDRR. The signal was upgraded in 1999 and again in 2018.

From 2004 to 2014, the station was known as WDEO-FM, airing Catholic-based talk and teaching programs. It was branded as "Ave Maria Radio" under the ownership of the Ave Maria Foundation. WDEO-FM aired all Notre Dame Fighting Irish football games in the 2008 season using the ISP Sports feed.

=== K-Love ===
On September 4, 2014, the Educational Media Foundation (EMF) announced it would purchase WDEO-FM for $2.2 million and convert the station to its Contemporary Christian music network, K-Love. The call sign was changed to WLVO.

On June 24, 2015, Classical South Florida announced the sale of its three South Florida classical stations, including WNPS (88.7 FM) in Fort Myers, to EMF. On July 17, 2015, EMF took over operations of 88.7 and began simulcasting the K-Love format on both WLVO and WNPS (renamed WDLV).

=== Sun Broadcasting ===
On August 13, 2015, the license for WLVO was converted to commercial broadcasting. EMF announced the sale of WLVO to a local media company, Sun Broadcasting. The sale, however, was quite contentious. Competing radio groups Renda Broadcasting and the Beasley Media Group filed a joint petition with the Federal Communications Commission to deny the sale. While Sun Broadcasting was below ownership limits in the market, the petition made the claim that it operates as one de facto group with Fort Myers Broadcasting. The two companies together share studio and staff. Renda and Beasley argued the sale should not go through because the two companies combined own far more signals than the FCC allowed. In the interim, on August 20, 2015, WLVO switched from K-Love to the Radio Nueva Vida Spanish Christian format.

After two years of airing Radio Nueva Vida programming, the FCC dismissed the petition and approved the sale. On June 12, 2017, the station changed its call sign to WKHW. On June 13, 2017, the purchase of the station by Sun Broadcasting from Educational Media Foundation was consummated, at a price of $3,045,000. The new owners immediately changed the call sign to the current WFFY. On June 15, 2017, WFFY changed its format from Spanish Christian to rhythmic contemporary, branded as "Fly 98.5".
