= WEVU-LP =

Television station in Fort Myers, Florida (1988–2009)

Former satellite of WUVF-LP, Naples, Florida
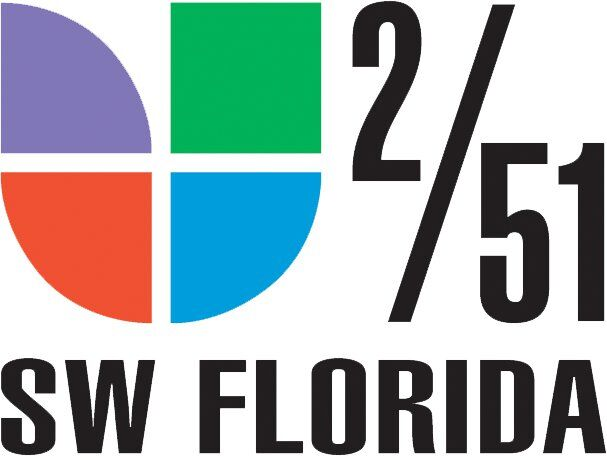
- Fort Myers, Florida; United States
- Channels: Analog: 4 (VHF)

Programming
- Affiliations: Channel America (1988−1990s); AIN (1990s); Network One (1990s); NET (1994−1998); UPN (1998−2006); Univision (2006−2009)

Ownership
- Owner: Silver Point Capital; (SP Ft. Myers LLC)

History
- Founded: December 16, 1986
- First air date: August 1988
- Last air date: August 14, 2009
- Former call signs: W07BR (1988−September 1995); WBRP-LP (September−November 1995)
- Former channel number: Analog: 7 (VHF, 1988−2001)
- Call sign meaning: Former call sign of WZVN-TV

Technical information
- Facility ID: 64579
- Class: CA
- ERP: 3 kW
- Transmitter coordinates: 26°38′47.0″N 81°52′6.0″W
- Translator(s): WBSP-CA 7 Naples

WEVU-LP (channel 4) was a low-power television station in Fort Myers, Florida, United States. Owned by Silver Point Capital, it was a satellite of Naples-based Univision affiliate WUVF-LP.

== History ==
Caloosa Television, the owners of WEVU (channel 26) in Naples, was awarded a construction permit for a new low-power TV station in Fort Myers on December 16, 1986. The station went on the air in August 1988 as W07BR (a.k.a. WBR) on channel 7, after Tim Pipher sought out the unused permit; Pipher owned a minority stake and also gave up his Canadian citizenship to be able to own the station. At the time, with no Major League Baseball team in Florida, the station was able to affiliate with the networks of multiple Major League teams, carrying as many as 188 games a year. In the baseball offseason, WBR carried Fort Myers Sun Sox games, using just one camera, plus college sports from several teams, Miami Heat basketball, and other syndicated sports fare, along with a local sports talk call-in show, Southwest Florida Sportsline, hosted by Pipher and former WEVU sports anchor Chris Barnes. Non-sports programming came from Channel America.

As the station was no longer able to obtain the baseball rights after the Florida Marlins began play, WBR shifted its focus to community programs and launched a repeater, W09BS (channel 9) in Naples. In 1994, local output included karaoke and gospel shows, a Spanish-language newscast, and community discussion programs; at other times, the station aired National Empowerment Television programming. On September 1, 1995, W07BR became WBRP-LP, while W09BS became WBSP-LP.

Just one month after the adoption of the WBRP and WBSP call letters, WEVU—which Caloosa had sold in 1991—became WZVN-TV. Caloosa promptly reclaimed the WEVU-LP call letters on November 6, 1995.

In March 1998, WTVK (now WXCW), at that time the UPN affiliate, dropped UPN for The WB. The original WB affiliate, cable-only "WB 10" (owned by MediaOne, now Comcast, and branded with the faux calls of "WSWF") picked up UPN. However, not everyone in the market could get "TV 10" (as it was later called), so UPN also made an affiliation deal with WEVU, which would allow for wider coverage.

It wasn't until later in 1998 when Caloosa Television made a deal with MediaOne to have the cable system take over the station's programming. MediaOne dropped the faux call letters of "WSWF" in favor of WEVU and incorporated WEVU-LP's local programming into their lineup, thus unifying the UPN affiliates in the market. WEVU moved to channel 4 in 2001 and WBSP to channel 7, due to digital television shuffles; WBSP had to move off channel 9 to allow WINK-TV to begin digital broadcasts on the channel.

This working relationship lasted until midnight on September 1, 2004. This occurred shortly after Caloosa struck a deal for carriage of the station (then known on-the-air as "UPN 8") on DirecTV. This forced WEVU to seek UPN programming via microwave from UPN owned-and-operated station WTOG out of St. Petersburg, Florida; they also aired WTOG's three-hour E/I block. All other programming on the station consisted of infomercials. Comcast continued to operate its own UPN affiliate, which began going by the faux call letters of "WNFM". WEVU was later picked up by Dish Network.

When UPN ended broadcasting in September 2006, WEVU filled the time slot with more infomercials. By this time, the stations had been sold to Equity Broadcasting, and were simulcasting the 6 p.m. newscast from Univision affiliate and sister station WUVF-CA. Equity subsequently decided to rebroadcast WUVF's entire schedule on WEVU (since WEVU, unlike WUVF, is available via DBS).

In 2007, Equity struck a deal with LatinAmerican Broadcasting to carry LAT TV on its group of stations beginning May 30, 2007; WEVU was to be one of the stations. However, WEVU continued to rebroadcast WUVF.

WBSP signed off March 11, 2008, after suffering technical problems.

On April 4, 2008, Equity announced the sale of all five of its Southwest Florida stations (including WEVU and WBSP) to Luken Communications, LLC for $8 million. Equity cited corporate financial losses as a reason for the sale. However, Equity Media Holdings entered Chapter 11 bankruptcy that December, and offers by Luken Communications to acquire Equity-owned stations in six markets were withdrawn.

WEVU was sold at auction to Silver Point Capital on April 16, 2009. The sale closed on August 17, 2009. WBSP was not named in the sale. WEVU then surrendered its previous class A classification, which it had held since 2002.

Three days before the completion of the sale to Silver Point, WEVU was taken silent. As a result, Dish Network began to obtain WUVF's programming via another satellite station, WLZE-LP (channel 51), on October 7, 2009. On March 10, 2011, WEVU-LP's license was cancelled by the FCC. WBSP's license had been cancelled on June 15, 2010.
