= WBCN (Florida) =

- North Fort Myers, Florida; United States
- Broadcast area: Fort Myers, Florida
- Frequency: 770 kHz

Ownership
- Owner: Fort Myers Broadcasting Company
- Sister stations: WAVV; WINK-FM; WINK-TV; WJPT; WTLQ-FM; WWCN

History
- First air date: December 17, 1983
- Last air date: March 2, 2026
- Former call signs: WKZY (1983–1984); WZRZ (1984–1990); WVTI (1990–1991); WRXK (1991); WWCN (1991–2013); WJBX (2013–2021)

Technical information
- Facility ID: 4437
- Class: B
- Power: 10,000 watts (day); 630 watts (night)
- Transmitter coordinates: 26.775°N 81.8475°W
- Translator: See § Translators

WBCN (770 AM) was a commercial radio station licensed to North Fort Myers, Florida, United States, that broadcast from 1983 until 2026. Last owned by Fort Myers Broadcasting Company, it featured a sports radio format at closure, with transmitter in North Fort Myers and studios in Estero. In addition to its AM signal, WBCN used two FM translators to air its programming: 104.3 W282BY and 98.1 W251AL, both in Fort Myers.

== History ==
WBCN first signed on the air on December 17, 1983, as big band station WKZY. In 1987, the station was acquired by Beasley Broadcasting, switching the format to oldies as WZRZ. The station also spent time as a soft adult contemporary outlet and also played active rock for a time.

For much of the 1990s and early 2000s, it used the call letters WWCN, originally as a radio affiliate of CNN Headline News and later as a talk station. On June 20, 2013, WWCN began simulcasting the rock music programming on WJBX (99.3 FM); the two stations swapped call signs.

On June 28, 2013, WJBX dropped its simulcast with WWCN and switched to Spanish-language sports radio, with programming from the ESPN Deportes Radio Network.

WJBX logo as a talk station

On June 16, 2016, WJBX changed its format back to talk. The station primarily carried nationally syndicated talk shows, including Dave Ramsey, Brian Kilmeade, Hugh Hewitt, Todd Schnitt and This Morning, America's First News with Gordon Deal. Weekend hosts included Larry Elder, Sebastian Gorka, Eric Metaxas, The Jesus Christ Show with Neil Saavedra, and repeats of weekday programs. WJBX carried Townhall News at the start of each hour.

The call sign was changed from WJBX to WBCN on February 5, 2021, with the WJBX call sign being moved to the 1660 AM facility in Charlotte, North Carolina, which had been WBCN. The Charlotte station went silent on December 31, 2020, as the result of the sale of its transmitter site land.

On May 28, 2021, WBCN changed their format from news/talk to sports, branded as "ESPN Southwest Florida", with programming from ESPN Radio; the format moved from WWCN.

On August 12, 2025, Beasley split its Fort Myers cluster and sold half to Fort Myers Broadcasting Company for $9 million along with WJPT and WWCN.

On March 2, 2026, WBCN and translator W251AL signed off the air. The Federal Communications Commission cancelled the station's license on July 7, 2026, at Fort Myers Broadcasting's request.

== Programming ==
WBCN carried Tampa Bay Rays baseball, Tampa Bay Buccaneers football, Florida Gators football, Florida Everblades hockey, Westwood One coverage of the National Football League, along with Florida Gulf Coast Eagles basketball. The station had also carried Florida Firecats football, Miami Hurricanes football, Florida State Seminoles football, Miami Marlins baseball and Fort Myers Miracle baseball in the past.

WBCN used to broadcast NBA, Major League Baseball, and college football games from ESPN Radio. NASCAR races from Motor Racing Network and Performance Racing Network moved to the then-WWCN from WCKT in 2006. Miami Dolphins games not aired on WRXK-FM, mostly in the preseason, were heard on WBCN, which carried the team full-time before picking up NASCAR.

== Technology ==
WBCN enjoyed the largest daytime coverage area of any AM radio station in Southwest Florida. As a music station (Transtar Radio Networks' "Format 41" and Satellite Music Network's "Z-Rock") the station transmitted in AM stereo, using the C-QUAM system. It incorporated HD radio technology.

== Translators ==
It was announced on July 2, 2012, that Beasley Broadcasting would purchase the two translators from Reach Communications for $150,000, to serve as rebroadcasters for WWCN's sports radio format (via WRXK-FM HD2): On June 20, 2013, these translators changed their format to alternative rock, relaying WRXK-FM HD2. Then in 2016, the translators began simulcasting WJBX's talk radio format.

Broadcast translators for WBCN
Call sign	Frequency	City of license	FID	ERP (W)	HAAT	Class	FCC info
W251AL	98.1 FM	Fort Myers, Florida	139037	230	129.2 m (424 ft)	D	LMS
W282BY	104.3 FM	Fort Myers, Florida	139201	250	92 m (302 ft)	D	LMS
