= WWCN =

Radio station in Fort Myers Beach, Florida

- Fort Myers Beach, Florida; United States
- Broadcast area: Southwest Florida
- Frequency: 99.3 MHz (HD Radio)
- Branding: Positively 99

Programming
- Format: Contemporary Christian

Ownership
- Owner: Fort Myers Broadcasting Company
- Sister stations: WAVV; WINK-FM; WINK-TV; WJPT; WTLQ-FM

History
- First air date: October 12, 1983
- Former call signs: WQEZ (1983–1990); WZCR (1990–1992); WJBX (1992–2013)

Technical information
- Licensing authority: FCC
- Facility ID: 74286
- Class: C2
- ERP: 50,000 watts
- HAAT: 142 meters (466 ft)
- Transmitter coordinates: 26.488°N 81.929°W

Links
- Public license information: Public file; LMS
- Website: positively99.com

WWCN (99.3 FM) is a commercial radio station licensed to Fort Myers Beach, Florida, United States. It is owned by the Fort Myers Broadcasting Company with studios on South Tamiami Trail (U.S. Route 41) in Estero.

== History ==
The station signed on the air on October 12, 1983. Its original call sign was WQEZ. As the call letters imply, it had an easy listening sound. It was powered at 3,000 watts, a fraction of its current output.

From the early 2000s until 2012, it was alternative rock station WJBX, although it flipped later to active rock after its sister station WRXK-FM switched to hot talk. Every December, WJBX hosted a concert called the "99Xmas Ball".

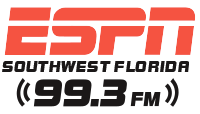
Logo as an ESPN Radio affiliate

On June 20, 2013, WJBX took over the ESPN Radio programming of sister station WWCN (770 AM), with the rock format moving back to WRXK-FM.

On May 28, 2021, the ESPN Radio format returned to 770 AM. At that point, WWCN changed its format to tropical music, branded as "Playa 99.3". (Playa is Spanish for Beach.)

On August 12, 2025, Beasley split its Fort Myers cluster and sold half to Fort Myers Broadcasting Company for $9 million along with WJPT and WBCN.

On March 2, 2026, after a weekend of stunting, WWCN changed its format to contemporary Christian, branded as "Positively 99".
