= WFSX (AM) =

- Fort Myers, Florida; United States
- Frequency: 1240 kHz

Programming
- Format: Regional Mexican

Ownership
- Owner: Sun Broadcasting, Inc.

History
- First air date: June 15, 1940
- Last air date: January 4, 2022
- Former call signs: WFTM (1939–1942); WAAC (1942–1943); WINK (1944–1999; 2003–2010); WTLQ (1999–2003); WFSX (2010–2013); WFWN (2013–2016)
- Call sign meaning: "Fox Sports" (former format)

Technical information
- Facility ID: 2882
- Class: C
- Power: 1,000 watts
- Transmitter coordinates: 26°37′40.00″N 81°49′50.00″W
- Repeater: 92.5 WFSX-FM HD2 (Estero)

WFSX (1240 AM) was a commercial radio station licensed to Fort Myers, Florida. The station was last owned by Sun Broadcasting.

The station was also heard on translator W231DC, 94.1 FM in Fort Myers, and via WFSX-FM and WHEL's HD2 channels.

== History ==
In 1939, a construction permit was issued to the Fort Myers Broadcasting Company to build a 250-watt radio station. WFTM (for Fort Myers) began broadcasting the following year, Southwest Florida's first radio station. It switched its call sign to WAAC in 1942, becoming an affiliate of the CBS Radio Network, airing its schedule of dramas, comedies, news, sports, soap operas, game shows and big band broadcasts during the Golden Age of Radio. The call letters changed to WINK in 1944, with a boost in power to 1,000 watts by day, but still running 250 watts at night. In 1954, Channel 11 WINK-TV went on the air. Because 1240 WINK was a CBS affiliate, WINK-TV also carried CBS programs, and still is Fort Myers' CBS affiliate today, even though it is under different ownership now. 96.9 WINK-FM signed on in 1964, and is still co-owned with the TV station, but not with 1240 WFSX.

In the 1970s and 1980s, 1240 WINK carried a full service format, playing Middle of the Road music and running CBS News at the beginning of each hour. By the 1990s, the music had been eliminated and the station concentrated on news and talk. Between 1999 and 2003, the WINK call letters moved to AM 1200, with AM 1240 renamed WTLQ. Both stations ran separate talk programming. From 2003 to 2010, the WINK call sign returned to AM 1240. Then in 2010, the WINK call letters again moved to 1200 AM, as 1240 began a simulcast with co-owned 92.5 WFSX-FM, airing different talk shows than 1200 AM. (AM 1200 became Spanish-language tropical music station WAXA.)

On December 7, 2020, WFSX split from its simulcast with WNOG and changed their format to alternative rock, branded as "Gelly 94.1".

=== Switch to sports programming ===
Sun Broadcasting announced that as of July 22, 2013, Fox News and Talk programming would be dropped on 1240 AM and 1270 AM. The stations became affiliates of NBC Sports Radio on July 22, 2013 at 6:00 a.m. On October 17, 2016, WFWN changed its call letters to WFSX and rebranded as "Fox Sports FM," to stress the FM translators.

=== La Raza 94.1 ===
On June 18, 2021, WFSX changed format from alternative rock (which continued on WHEL 93.7-HD2) to Regional Mexican, branded as "La Raza 94.1".

WFSX's license was cancelled on January 4, 2022, becoming that year’s first radio station license cancellation in the United States.

== Translators ==
On July 3, 2015, Sun Broadcasting acquired 97.3 W247AQ in Tropical Gulf Acres, Florida from Reach Communications for $35,000, to rebroadcast WFSX. Two other translators were set up in Fort Myers and Bayshore to rebroadcast WFSX. On April 20, 2017, its callsign changed to W290DB.
