= Kerry Sanders =

American broadcast journalist

- Born: New York City
- Education: University of South Florida
- Occupation: Television journalist
- Years active: 1982–2023
- Employer: NBC News

Kerry Sanders is a retired American broadcast journalist. He was a correspondent for NBC News from 1991 to 2023. He worked as a general news reporter for a number of Florida television stations, including WTLV in Jacksonville, FL (where he worked as a paid intern), WINK in Ft. Myers, WTVT, the CBS affiliate and later Fox owned and operated station in Tampa and WTVJ (NBC) in Miami. He is a 1982 graduate of the University of South Florida, from which he received his bachelor's degree and later a Distinguished Alumni Award. In 1996, he became a correspondent for NBC News, based in the network's Miami bureau. He was immediately thrust into a major story, when the ValuJet Flight 592 crash occurred in the Everglades just days after he began with NBC.

He was a general assignment reporter and was seen at news events throughout the world and was regularly seen on NBC Nightly News, the Today show, MSNBC, and Dateline NBC. He retired on January 17, 2023, after 32 years with the network. During his retirement segment on the NBC Nightly News broadcast on January 17, 2023, he thanked his wife Deborah for putting up with him.

== Awards ==
Sanders is a Peabody Journalism Award winner, Emmy Award winner, Columbia DuPont Award winner and National Headliner award winner.

== Notable coverage ==
He was well known for his hurricane coverage during his career, including Hurricanes Andrew, Ivan, and Katrina. He has also been on the front lines in both Desert Storm in 1991 and as an embedded reporter with the US Marines during the Iraq War in 2003.
