= WHEL =

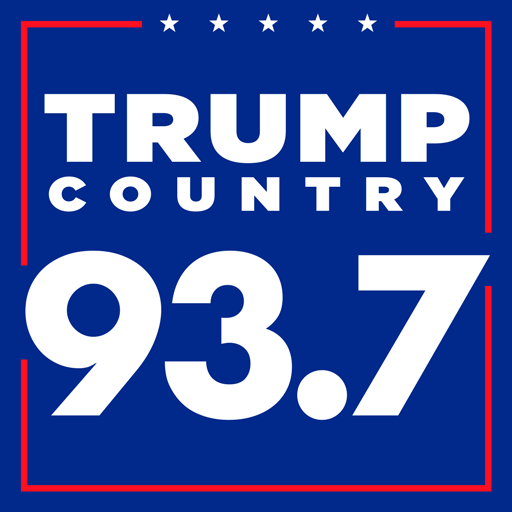
- Sanibel, Florida; United States
- Broadcast area: Cape Coral–Fort Myers Metropolitan Area
- Frequency: 93.7 MHz (HD Radio)
- Branding: Trump Country 93.7

Programming
- Format: Country music
- Subchannels: HD2: Sports (WFSX-HD2)

Ownership
- Owner: Sun Broadcasting, Inc.
- Sister stations: WARO; WFFY; WFSX-FM; WFTX-TV; WRXK-FM; WXCW; WXKB

History
- First air date: December 1971
- Former call signs: WLAJ (1971–1974); WRGI (1974–1989); WLAZ (1989–1990); WRGI (1990–1994); WNOG-FM (1994–1997); WPRW (1997–1999); WTLT (1999–2013); WXNX (2013–2020)
- Former frequencies: 93.5 MHz (1971–2000)
- Call sign meaning: Former "Hell Yeah" branding

Technical information
- Licensing authority: FCC
- Facility ID: 66223
- Class: C2
- ERP: 43,000 watts
- HAAT: 145 meters (476 ft)
- Transmitter coordinates: 26°30′19.3″N 81°51′13.3″W
- Translators: HD2: 94.1 W231DC (Fort Myers); HD2: 103.3 W277AP (Bayshore)

Links
- Public license information: Public file; LMS
- Website: radiotrump.com; HD2: foxsportsfm.com

WHEL (93.7 FM) is a commercial radio station licensed to Sanibel, Florida, United States, and serving the Cape Coral–Fort Myers Metropolitan Area. The station is owned by Sun Broadcasting and airs a country music format branded as "Trump Country." The studios are located on Palm Beach Boulevard (Florida State Road 80) in Fort Myers, near the Caloosahatchee River.

WHEL's transmitter is sited on Ten Mile Drive in San Carlos Park, off Old Route 41. The station broadcasts in HD Radio; the HD2 digital subchannel carries a sports radio formal, which feeds two FM translators, 94.1 in Fort Myers and 103.3 in Bayshore.

== History ==
=== WALJ-FM and WRGI-FM ===
The station signed on the air in December 1971. Its original call sign was WALJ-FM, its city of license was Naples and it broadcast on 93.5 MHz. It was a Class A station, only powered at 3,000 watts, a fraction of its current output.

The station changed its call letters to WRGI-FM in 1974. It became the sister station to WRGI 1510 AM on Marco Island, now dark. WRGI-FM was known as "G-93.5," airing a Top 40 format. It flipped to adult contemporary music during the late 1970s. In 1987, the station returned to Top 40 hits when it became "Lazer 93.5". At first, it kept its WRGI call letters but switched to WLAZ as "Lazer 93.5" in 1989. Its Top 40 format lasted for nearly three years.

=== WNOG-FM and WTLT ===
The station changed to classic rock and returned to its WRGI call letters on November 19, 1990. It later shifted to an oldies format. In mid-September 1994, the station dropped the format and WRGI call letters. It became a simulcast of WNOG 1270 AM (now dark) airing a talk radio format as WNOG-FM.

On February 17, 1997, WNOG-FM became WPRW with a dance radio format with the station's moniker name "Power 93.5". This lasted until March 24, 1999, when the station flipped to soft adult contemporary as "Lite 93.5" with the call letters WTLT. It later shifted to mainstream adult contemporary.

In late 2002, WTLT's frequency changed from 93.5 to 93.7 FM. This was coupled with an increase to its power, giving it a larger coverage area. In 2010, WTLT moved its transmitter closer to Fort Myers, to more effectively cover Lee County, and the northern part of the market.

=== 93X ===
In 2013, the Beasley Broadcast Group shifted its active rock format from WJBX to WRXK-FM to make room for the move of ESPN Radio to 99.3 FM. On June 19, 2013, WTLT dropped its "Lite 93.7" adult contemporary format and became active rock-formatted 93X. On June 26, 2013, WTLT changed its call letters to WXNX.

=== First iteration of "Trump Country" and "Hell Yeah" ===
On September 16, 2020, the station flipped to automated country music as "Trump Country 93.7", with no airstaff. It used promos performed by a Donald Trump impersonator. The 93X Facebook page announced that it would be "back on a new channel soon!" The Trump-branded country music lasted only three months.

On December 18, WXNX rebranded as "Hell Yeah 93.7" under new WHEL call letters. The station's programmer claimed the switch was made due to Joe Biden campaign officials reaching out to the station. The claim included threats that Biden's new FCC commissioners would revoke the station's license upon his taking office on January 20, 2021, due to alleged equal time violations, though this was likely promotional hyperbole, as both the campaign and FCC never commented on the claims.

In September and October 2022, the station was silent for several weeks due to Hurricane Ian. WHEL returned to the air with the "Latino" Spanish-language contemporary hit radio format normally heard on WTLQ-FM (97.7), which was still out of service at the time. On October 21, WTLQ-FM returned to the air, allowing WHEL to resume its country format.

=== Top 40 and second iteration of "Trump Country" ===
On January 18, 2024, WHEL dropped the country format, moving it to WHEL-HD3 and translator W231DC (94.1 FM). The main signal began stunting with all-Taylor Swift music.

At 9 a.m. on January 22, WHEL flipped back to contemporary hit radio as "Hot 93.7", with the intention of taking on Top 40 leader 103.9 WXKB. Hot 93.7 took swipes at WXKB about its commercial break lengths, music choices, and "national" focus in contests. It also created a flanker for sister station WFFY against its own rival WBTT. The first song as "Hot 93.7" was "Dance the Night" by Dua Lipa.

On January 20, 2025, at noon, on the day that Donald Trump was inaugurated as the 47th president of the United States, and nearly one year after flipping to CHR, WHEL switched back to country, returning to the "Trump Country 93.7" branding. The first song on the second iteration of "Trump Country" was "Hurricane" by Luke Combs. Station promos and announcements continue to use the same Donald Trump impersonator as the first iteration of the "Trump Country 93.7" format. The station, in its last full monthly as "Hot" before the format change back to "Trump Country", it had a 1.3 share in the ratings, compared to WXKB's 2.4 share in the same month.

== HD Radio ==
On March 7, 2022, WHEL-HD2 changed its format from Regional Mexican music to Active Rock. It used the branding "Rock 103.3".

On May 14, 2024, WHEL-HD2/W277AP dropped its "Rock 103.3" format. It switched to a simulcast of WFSX-HD2's "Fox Sports Fort Myers" sports radio format.

On July 1, 2024, WHEL dropped the "Hell Yeah 94.1" country format on its HD3 subchannel and the 94.1 translator, switching to "Fox Sports Fort Myers", simulcasting WFSX-HD2.
