= WNFM (TV) =

Cable channel in Fort Myers, Florida (1995–2015)

- Fort Myers–Naples, Florida; United States
- Channels: Analog: 8 (cable)
- Branding: My TV 8

Programming
- Affiliations: The WB (1995–1998); UPN (1998–2006); Jewelry Television (overnights); MyNetworkTV (2006–2015); This TV (2009?–2015)

Ownership
- Owner: Comcast

History
- Founded: January 11, 1995
- Last air date: July 2015
- Former call signs: "WSWF" (1995–1998); WEVU-LP (official, 1998–2004)
- Former channel numbers: 10 (cable, 1995–1998)
- Call sign meaning: Naples/Fort Myers

"WNFM" was a cable channel serving Fort Myers and Naples, Florida, United States, affiliated with MyNetworkTV. The call sign is fictional as the channel was not licensed by the Federal Communications Commission (FCC). It was broadcast exclusively on Comcast channel 8 (hence the My TV 8 branding) and was operated from Comcast's Southwest Florida headquarters south of Naples Manor on Tower Road along SR 951/Collier Boulevard. WNFM was the largest cable-only MyNetworkTV affiliate.

== History ==
This channel began on January 11, 1995, as an affiliate of The WB. It was carried exclusively on MediaOne channel 10 (then Southwest Florida's cable provider) and was not available over-the-air. It used the fictional call letters "WSWF" (for Southwest Florida) and was branded as "WB 10". In March 1998, WSWF switched affiliations with WTVK (now WXCW) and became a UPN affiliate.

However, anyone in the market that did not have cable could not get "TV 10" as it was later called, so UPN made an affiliation deal with low-power station WEVU-LP which would allow for additional coverage over-the-air. Several months later, WEVU owner Caloosa Television made a deal with MediaOne to have the cable system take over programming of the off-air station on analog VHF channel 7.

MediaOne then discarded the faux WSWF call letters in favor of WEVU-LP (already in use officially as assigned by the FCC) and adopted the on-air moniker "UPN 8" after changing its cable channel to that location (previously used by over-the-air WEVU). MediaOne replaced the over-the-air station's non-network programming with its own thus unifying the UPN affiliates in the market. During this period, the network could also be seen in Naples on low-powered WBSP-LP on VHF channel 9 because this translator repeated WEVU-LP's weak signal to the market's southern locations.

The working relationship lasted until midnight on September 1, 2004, shortly after Holston Valley Broadcasting (then owner of over-the-air WEVU-LP) struck a deal for carriage of the station on DirecTV. However, this forced VHF channel 7 to seek UPN programming via microwave from UPN owned-and-operated station WTOG in St. Petersburg, Florida. Eventually, Comcast merged with MediaOne and took over as the area's cable provider. The company continued to operate the UPN affiliate on cable channel 8 which resumed using fictional call letters, "WNFM".

On January 24, 2006, The WB and UPN announced the merger of the two networks into the new network The CW in September 2006. On March 9, ACME Communications announced all of its WB stations (including WTVK) would affiliate with The CW, an effectively default decision as the group's CEO was a former WB executive. WNFM was unlikely to have any chance at a CW affiliation even without ACME's connections, as the network looked to have over-the-air carriage the cable channel would never have. WNFM would not confirm its affiliation with the competing Fox Television Stations-owned MyNetworkTV until August 10. At the network's inception on September 5, WNFM changed its branding to "My TV 8" and Comcast debuted a new website for the station featuring a new logo. At one point, WNFM was the official "broadcast" home of the Florida Everblades ice hockey team, airing every Saturday night home game.

As time went on and MyNetworkTV went from a full network to a programming service in the fall of 2009, Comcast began to reduce the syndicated programming on the station. By 2013, WNFM was effectively a near full-day affiliate of This TV, while continuing to carry MyNetworkTV's programming in prime time. As both programming agreements ended, Comcast quietly took WNFM off the air by the start of July 2015. MyNetworkTV would not return to Southwest Florida until March 2019, when WINK-TV picked up the network for its second subchannel associated with Antenna TV.

== Programming ==
At one point as a UPN affiliate, WNFM aired an hour-long lifestyle/entertainment magazine program called D'Latinos Morning News in Spanish on weekdays from 7 to 8 a.m. Eventually, the show moved to low-power Azteca América affiliate WTPH-LP. In late-August 2006 through a news share agreement, ABC affiliate WZVN-TV began producing a nightly half-hour prime time newscast called ABC 7 Gulfshore News at 10 on My TV 8. This was the second show established in the time slot behind long dominant Fox affiliate WFTX-TV. Since WZVN shares a news department with NBC affiliate WBBH-TV, some personalities seen on that station were also seen on the WNFM broadcast.

On March 26, 2007, CBS affiliate WINK-TV began airing a 10pm newscast on WXCW only a few weeks after WINK entered into a shared services agreement with WXCW's new owner. Within mere days, it leapfrogged Gulfshore News at 10 and became competitive with WFTX in a manner WNFM's newscast could not. The show was quietly discontinued at the end of the 2006–07 television season on May 25, 2007.
