= WNPL =

- Golden Gate, Florida; United States
- Broadcast area: Naples, Florida
- Frequencies: 1460 kHz; 1200 kHz (WAXA)

Programming
- Format: Defunct (WAXA simulcast))

Ownership
- Owner: Fort Myers Broadcasting Company

History
- First air date: 2009
- Call sign meaning: NaPLes

Technical information
- Facility ID: 160167
- Class: B
- Power: 7,000 watts day 2,000 watts night
- Transmitter coordinates: 26°15′26″N 81°40′33″W
- Translator: 95.7 W239CL (Golden Gate)

WNPL (1460 AM) was a radio station simulcasting WAXA, broadcasting out of Ft. Myers, Florida. Licensed to Golden Gate, Florida, it served Collier County (including Naples). The station was last owned by Fort Myers Broadcasting Company.

== History ==
WNPL signed on in 2009 to improve coverage for WPTK (which at the time was affiliated with Fox Sports Radio) in the southern end of the market.

On January 22, 2018, WNPL rebranded as "Maxima 97.3/95.7".

Fort Myers Broadcasting surrendered WNPL's license to the Federal Communications Commission, which cancelled the license on May 21, 2021.

== Former usage ==
WNPL was formerly the call sign of an FM station (frequency 106.7 MHz) licensed to Belle Meade, Tennessee (Nashville market area) from 1998 to 2005. Since 2005 this station has been known as WNFN, freeing the WNPL call sign for its current use.
