= WZVN-TV =

Television station in Naples, Florida

- Naples–Fort Myers, Florida; United States
- City: Naples, Florida
- Channels: Digital: 28 (UHF); Virtual: 26
- Branding: Gulf Coast ABC

Programming
- Affiliations: 26.1: ABC; for others, see § Subchannels

Ownership
- Owner: Montclair Communications, Inc.
- Operator: Hearst Television
- Sister stations: WBBH-TV

History
- First air date: August 21, 1974
- Former call signs: WEVU (1974–1995)
- Former channel numbers: Analog: 26 (UHF, 1974–2009); Digital: 41 (UHF, 2002–2019), 15 (UHF, temporary share with WBBH-TV, 2019–2020)
- Call sign meaning: sounds like "seven" (cable channel number position)

Technical information
- Licensing authority: FCC
- Facility ID: 19183
- ERP: 1,000 kW
- HAAT: 454.5 m (1,491 ft)
- Transmitter coordinates: 26°49′22.4″N 81°45′53.6″W

Links
- Public license information: Public file; LMS
- Website: www.gulfcoastnewsnow.com

WZVN-TV (channel 26, cable channel 7), branded as Gulf Coast ABC, is a television station licensed to Naples, Florida, United States, serving as the ABC network affiliate for Southwest Florida. It is owned by Montclair Communications and operated by Hearst Television alongside Fort Myers–licensed NBC affiliate WBBH-TV (channel 20). The two stations share studio facilities on Central Avenue in Fort Myers; WZVN-TV's transmitter is located along SR 31 in unincorporated southeastern Charlotte County.

Channel 26 went on the air in Naples on August 21, 1974, as WEVU, the first ABC affiliate in Southwest Florida. It operated from studios in Naples and suffered from turnover in ownership as well as poor local ratings. This continued even though the station moved its transmitter further north from its original location in the late 1980s to improve its signal in Fort Myers. In 1994, owner Ellis Communications entered into a local marketing agreement (LMA) with Waterman Broadcasting, which owned WBBH, by which WBBH began to provide the station's news programming. The station itself was then sold in 1996 to Montclair Communications, whose principal has family and business ties with the Waterman family. Though news ratings have remained low, the Waterman LMA gave the station access to additional resources and a path to profitability. The two stations have separate newscasts with separate anchors, though they share reporters, news resources, and—as of 2025—a common news brand.

== History ==
=== Sign-on and early years ===
In May 1972, the Federal Communications Commission (FCC) approved the addition of television channel 26 to Naples at the request of the Gulfshore Television Corporation. Three months prior, G. Vernon Lundquist, founder of Gulfshore, had resigned from his job at WINK-TV in Fort Myers after 20 years and petitioned for the addition of the channel in Naples. Gulfshore then applied for the channel, as did Gray Communications Systems of Albany, Georgia. The construction permit was granted to Gulfshore in July 1973, and the company immediately began to pursue affiliation with ABC. Construction then began on studios located off US 41 in Bonita Springs; a change in the antenna site pushed back completion of the facility.

WEVU first signed on the air on August 21, 1974. Its early months quickly turned turbulent. In December 1974, Lundquist was asked to take a leave of absence by the board of directors; his wife Marilyn, who was tapped to be the operations manager, was fired. Early the next month, Gulfshore's minority stockholders sued Lundquist, saying that the stock he held was illegally issued; at that same time, the station fired 15 staff, canceled its early evening news, and began signing on at 11:30 a.m. instead of 7 a.m. In a summary judgment that March, a circuit court found in favor of the other stockholders.

In a second lawsuit filed in May 1975, more details surfaced about Lundquist's tenure running the new station. According to the suit filed by Gulfshore's other stockholders, Lundquist solicited a WEVU employee to appear in a sex movie; failed to pay the lease on the station's broadcast equipment; used his own company to make commercials, competing with WEVU's own advertising department; and hired relatives who were unqualified for their positions, jeopardizing the station's future. In addition, the minority owners of Gulfshore said that, by failing to obtain a direct link with ABC, the station had lost $200,000 in advertising business; WEVU obtained its ABC programming off-air from Sarasota's WXLT (channel 40, now WWSB), leaving it at the mercy of WXLT's own preemptions of ABC network fare.

In May 1976, Lundquist sold his controlling interest in WEVU to the other seven stockholders, after his shares were reinstated by an appeals court. With the other members of Gulfshore in control, the company set out to try and get WEVU on the right foot after the station nearly closed; they hired Joe Buerry, one of the founders of WBBH-TV, as the new general manager, and WEVU also restored the local news it had cut back earlier. In May 1978, a film distributor mixup was responsible for the station airing 30 minutes of a pornographic film instead of its intended late feature, Daring Game.

=== Home News era ===
In May 1978, Gulfshore announced the sale of channel 26 to Caloosa Television, a subsidiary of the Home News Company of New Brunswick, New Jersey, for a total of $3.3 million. WEVU was the seventh broadcasting property and second TV station owned by Home News.

For years, it had been a standing complaint of viewers, and southwest Florida's TV stations, that Miami Dolphins games that did not sell out could not be aired in the Fort Myers–Naples market. In 1979, then-new news director Jack Speiss was surprised when the station did not air a Monday Night Football game because of a blackout; he eventually was able to telephone then-Dolphins owner Joe Robbie, who told him in no uncertain terms, "I'm not going to allow you to broadcast it." Tension over what came to be known locally as the "Robbie Rule" boiled over in 1984 when the Dolphins blacked out WEVU again on Monday night. However, once WEVU's scheduled movie ended, and with the game still going on, channel 26 joined the network telecast in progress, and the general manager issued a statement criticizing the "Robbie Rule" which was read on the station's late newscast.

The late 1980s saw two significant upgrades. In 1987, WEVU moved to new studio facilities in the Bonita Bay Executive Center, where the front entrance was designed to also double as an outdoor studio and the station would have more space to operate. (The previous studios were then occupied by WSFP-TV, giving the PBS station its first proper headquarters.) Its second upgrade, a new tower on the Lee–Collier county line, was more controversial. The National Audubon Society warned that the construction of the tower would cause potential harm to a sanctuary of wood storks and asked the ABC network to intervene in the dispute, which it refused. In October 1987, Lee County approved the zoning for the new transmitter tower; a 1989 settlement brokered by Governor Bob Martinez enabled WEVU to finally build the facility and begin broadcasting from it that summer. The relocated tower improved WEVU's signal in the northern and eastern portions of the market, particularly in Charlotte County. However, by 1991, WEVU still had half the audience share of either WINK or WBBH.

A side venture for WEVU began in the late 1980s with a low-power TV station permit in Fort Myers held by Caloosa that the station was not using. Ultimately, Caloosa sold 49 percent of it to Tim Pipher, and the station signed on in August 1988 as W07BR; the station was noted for its extensive affiliations with baseball team networks, carrying more than 180 games a season.

=== FCVS and Ellis ownership ===
WEVU logo in 1991

In 1991, Home News put WEVU on the market in a bid to pay down long-term debt. Home News accepted a bid from Young Broadcasting in January 1992, but the deal fell apart that March, and Home News instead sold WEVU to FCVS Communications of Columbia, South Carolina, for $9.925 million. FCVS, owned by two former ABC executives, promised to infuse resources into WEVU's news department.

FCVS, which also owned WKCH-TV (now WTNZ) in Knoxville, Tennessee, and WACH in Columbia, South Carolina, received an "offer it could not refuse" and sold itself to newly formed Ellis Communications in 1993. However, the station continued to struggle; it was understaffed and had outdated equipment.

=== Waterman and Hearst LMA ===
Logo of WZVN-TV in 2023

Effective June 1, 1994, Ellis entered into a local marketing agreement (LMA) with WBBH-TV, owned by Waterman Broadcasting, whereby WBBH would produce all news programming for WEVU. Some WEVU staffers were not retained by WBBH; in all, there were 20 firings, including WEVU's main news, weather and sports anchors. The local marketing agreement also saw WEVU leave Bonita Bay to join WBBH at its Central Avenue studios in Fort Myers; WTVK (channel 46) moved from Naples into the old WEVU facilities in 1995.

After Waterman took over WEVU, both stations began identifying by their cable channel slots—WBBH as channel 2 and WEVU as channel 7. The station changed its call letters to the current WZVN-TV (a phonetic translation of "seven") on October 23, 1995, a move to establish credibility for a station whose name had a poor reputation. Former owners Caloosa, who still owned W07BR, promptly reclaimed the WEVU calls for what became WEVU-LP, later WEVU-CA.

Ellis Communications merged with Raycom Media in 1996; under a deal previously made by Ellis, WZVN-TV's license was sold to Montclair Communications, which continued the LMA with WBBH. Montclair was founded by Lara Kunkler, station manager for WBBH and WZVN and the goddaughter of Bernie Waterman, owner of Waterman Broadcasting. The deal allowed a once-money-losing station to become profitable. In 2001, Waterman attempted to merge with Montclair by way of a stock swap. However, instead of allowing the deal, the FCC let the application languish; at one point, it ordered the LMA unwound by 2004.

On April 5, 2023, Hearst Television announced that it had agreed to purchase WBBH-TV from Waterman for $220 million. Included in the purchase was Hearst assuming the LMA with Montclair for WZVN-TV. The sale was completed on June 30. Hearst rebranded WBBH-TV and WZVN-TV as Gulf Coast NBC and Gulf Coast ABC, with newscasts known as Gulf Coast News, effective February 5, 2025.

== News operation ==
Logo of Gulf Coast News since February 5, 2025

WEVU's first news operation was known as Closeup News with daily 6:30 and 11 p.m. broadcasts; general manager Lundquist presented the weather. When the station fell into financial difficulties, the news department was cut back. After Lundquist was ousted in 1976, Gulfshore reinstated a local news service under the "Newscene" name, airing at 6 and 11 p.m.

In 1981, under Home News ownership, Jack Wheeler, who had been one of the first anchors on Closeup News in 1974, returned to the station; WEVU hoped the new anchor would increase its perennially low ratings. Wheeler also hosted a talk show on WRCC radio at the time. However, when WEVU management changed over, Wheeler was removed from the newscast; he then hosted a morning talk show for channel 26 and later a late-night show before being fired in 1985. After having 5 p.m. and 11 p.m. newscasts, WEVU added a 6 p.m. broadcast in the fall of 1989; the station made significant improvements in an attempt to lift its news out of third place. Within a year, the 5 p.m. show was discontinued, bringing the station back to two daily evening newscasts.

In the immediate wake of the Waterman LMA, WEVU's news offerings were radically changed; in addition to the dismissals of its main presenting team, WEVU's early news moved to 4 p.m. and its 11 p.m. show was cut back to a five-minute update. Waterman also invested in facilities and equipment. WBBH–WZVN had the market's first Doppler weather radar installed in the mid-1990s, and in 1997, a studio expansion was completed allowing both stations to present simultaneous 11 p.m. newscasts. The stations have dedicated anchors but share reporters; during major hurricane coverage, the stations have often aired a single telecast using their combined news and weather resources. Despite the shared resources, news viewership has tilted strongly toward WBBH over WZVN, which has primarily competed for third with WFTX-TV in local news ratings.

From August 2006 to May 2007, WZVN produced ABC 7 Gulfshore News at 10 for cable channel "WNFM", the MyNetworkTV station in the market. It was canceled as not financially viable.

In 2018, the Waterman stations cut back their sports department; weeknight sportscasts were eliminated, along with the position of sports director for WBBH-TV.

== Technical information ==
=== Subchannels ===
WZVN-TV's transmitter is located along SR 31 in unincorporated southeastern Charlotte County. The station's signal is multiplexed:

Subchannels of WZVN-TV
Subchannel	Res.	Short name	Programming
26.1	720p	WZVN-HD	ABC
26.2	480i	MeTV	MeTV
26.3	480i	Dabl	Dabl
26.4	480i	getTV	Great
26.5	480i	365BLK	365BLK
26.6	480i	DEFY	Defy

Subchannel broadcast with MPEG-4 video

=== Analog-to-digital conversion ===
On October 31, 2002, WZVN-TV and WBBH-TV began broadcasting high-definition television, the first stations in the market to do so. With the change to digital, WZVN moved north from its former site in southern Lee County to WBBH-TV's facility.

WZVN-TV discontinued regular programming on its analog signal, over UHF channel 26, on February 17, 2009, the original digital television transition date. The station's digital signal remained on its pre-transition UHF channel 41, using virtual channel 26.

Between October 2019 and March 2020, WZVN-TV broadcast on the WBBH-TV multiplex (physical channel 15) until WZVN began broadcasts on its post-repack channel coinciding with phase 8 of the repack; during construction, the WZVN-TV antenna was not available for use.

== See also ==
- Channel 7 branded TV stations in the United States
- Channel 15 digital TV stations in the United States
- Channel 26 virtual TV stations in the United States
