= WFSX-FM =

Coordinates: 26.317°N 81.787°W

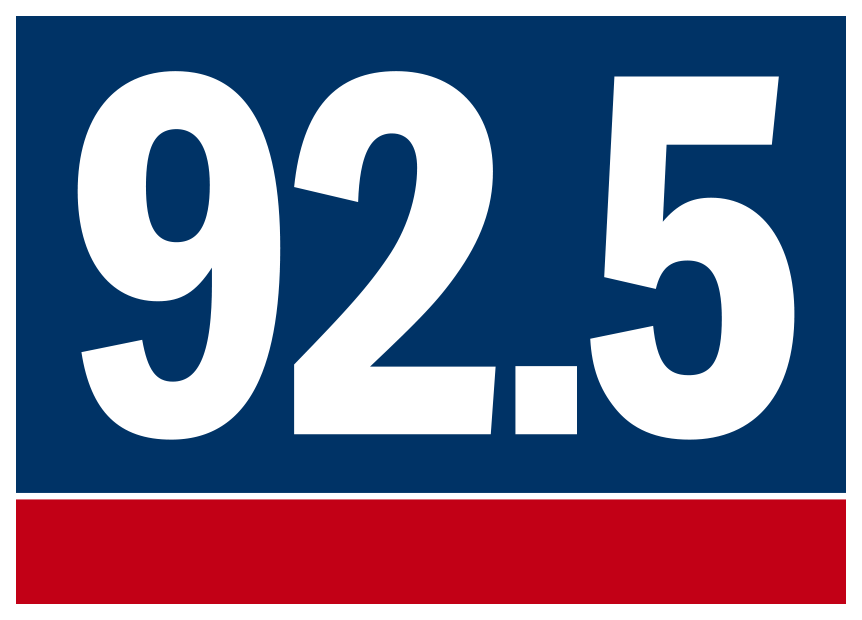
- Estero, Florida; United States
- Broadcast area: Fort Myers-Naples; Southwest Florida
- Frequency: 92.5 MHz (HD Radio)
- Branding: 92.5 Right All Along

Programming
- Format: Conservative talk
- Subchannels: HD2: Sports
- Affiliations: Fox News Radio; HD2: Fox Sports Radio

Ownership
- Owner: Sun Broadcasting, Inc.
- Sister stations: WARO; WFFY; WFTX-TV; WHEL; WRXK-FM; WXCW; WXKB

History
- First air date: December 16, 1978
- Former call signs: WVHG (1979–1988); WKZY (1988–1998); WWWD (1998–2000); WRQC (2000–2007); WUSV (2007–2008); WNTY (2008–2009); WFSX (2009–2010)
- Call sign meaning: Fox News

Technical information
- Licensing authority: FCC
- Facility ID: 50321
- Class: C2
- ERP: 20,500 watts
- HAAT: 210 meters (690 ft)
- Translator: HD2: 105.9 W290DB (Naples)

Links
- Public license information: Public file; LMS
- Website: rightallalong.net; HD2: foxsportsfm.com

WFSX-FM (92.5 MHz, "92.5 Right All Along") is a commercial radio station licensed to Estero, Florida, United States, and serving the Fort Myers-Naples area of Southwest Florida. Owned by Sun Broadcasting, the station features a conservative talk format. The station's studios and offices are on Bonita Beach Road in Bonita Springs.

WFSX-FM's transmitter is located off of Old 41 Road in Bonita Springs. WFSX-FM broadcasts in HD Radio; the HD2 digital subchannel carries Fox Sports Radio and feeds FM translators W290DB at 105.9 MHz and W277AP at 103.3 MHz.

== History ==
The station signed on the air on December 16, 1978. It was originally licensed to LaBelle, Florida, as WVHG at 92.1 MHz. It was owned by LaBelle Broadcasting with an effective radiated power of 3,000 watts, airing a country music format.

In the 1990s and early 2000s, the station went through several changes in call letters and ownership. In the late 1990s, it entered into a country music simulcast arrangement with 92.9 WIKX Punta Gorda. On March 26, 2008, the station switched to an oldies format, playing 1960s and 70s hits. Six days later, the call sign was changed to WNTY.

On September 17, 2009, the station flipped to a news-talk format, branded under the on-air name "92.5 Fox News". On September 25, 2009, WNTY changed its call letters to WFSX-FM, to go with its "Fox News" branding.

WFSX-FM's programming was once simulcast on WNOG (1270 AM) in Naples, Florida, and WFSX (1240 AM) in Fort Myers. As of July 22, 2013, Fox News programming is no longer available on 1240 AM and 1270 AM.

Those stations changed to a sports radio format. The Fort Myers station became WFWN, subsequently returning to the WFSX call sign in 2016. WFSX’s license at 1240 AM was cancelled on January 4, 2022 but the sports programming continues on 92.5 HD2 and on 105.9 FM, as well as WNOG 1270 and its translators.

== Programming ==
Local personalities on WFSX-FM include Jason Jones and Trey Radel. The rest of the schedule is nationally syndicated talk shows.

== Translators ==
WFSX-FM broadcasts its HD2 subchannel on the following translators:

Broadcast translators for WFSX-HD2
| Call sign | Frequency | City of license | FID | ERP (W) | HAAT | Class | FCC info |
|---|---|---|---|---|---|---|---|
| W231DC | 94.1 FM | Fort Myers, Florida | 138791 | 245 | 0 m (0 ft) | D | LMS |
| W277AP | 103.3 FM | Bayshore, Florida | 139003 | 160 | 0 m (0 ft) | D | LMS |
| W290DB | 105.9 FM | Naples, Florida | 139101 | 250 | 82 m (269 ft) | D | LMS |
