= WXCW =

Television station in Naples, Florida

- Naples–Fort Myers, Florida; United States
- City: Naples, Florida
- Channels: Digital: 32 (UHF); Virtual: 46
- Branding: WINK CW; WINK News

Programming
- Affiliations: 46.1: The CW/MyNetworkTV; 46.3: Univision; for others, see § Subchannels

Ownership
- Owner: Sun Broadcasting, Inc.
- Operator: Fort Myers Broadcasting Company
- Sister stations: WFTX-TV, WINK-TV, WUVF-LD, WLZE-LD, WANA-LD

History
- Founded: August 14, 1986
- First air date: October 22, 1990
- Former call signs: WNPL-TV (1990–1995); WTVK (1995–2007)
- Former channel numbers: Analog: 46 (UHF, 1990–2009); Digital: 45 (UHF, until 2020)
- Former affiliations: Independent (1990–1995); UPN (1995–1998); The WB (1998–2006)
- Call sign meaning: The CW

Technical information
- Licensing authority: FCC
- Facility ID: 61504
- ERP: 1,000 kW
- HAAT: 393 m (1,289 ft)
- Transmitter coordinates: 26°48′2.8″N 81°45′44.3″W

Links
- Public license information: Public file; LMS

WXCW (channel 46), branded as WINK CW, is a television station licensed to Naples, Florida, United States, serving as the CW and MyNetworkTV affiliate for Southwest Florida. It is locally owned by Sun Broadcasting alongside Fox affiliate WFTX-TV (channel 36) and two low-power stations: Univision/UniMás affiliate WUVF-LD (channel 2) and WANA-LD (channel 18), and operated by Fort Myers Broadcasting Company with Fort Myers–licensed CBS affiliate WINK-TV (channel 11). The stations share studios on Corporate Lakes Drive in Gateway; WXCW's transmitter is located north of Fort Myers Shores, near the Charlotte–Lee county line.

== History ==
The station first signed on the air on October 22, 1990, as WNPL-TV, which was founded and run by chief executive officer William Darling of Southwest Florida Telecommunications. Originally operating as an independent station, it filled a void in the market after WFTX-TV (channel 36) joined Fox four years earlier in October 1986. The station first operated from studios located on Goodlette Road in Naples. WNPL-TV was beset with problems early on, particularly concerning finding programming. Despite this, from 1993 to 1998, the station carried Florida Marlins baseball games televised by WBFS-TV in Miami before the debut of the Tampa Bay Rays, which then claimed southwest Florida as the team's territory. It also was the area's affiliate for the Orlando Magic broadcast network.

WNPL-TV filed for bankruptcy in 1993 after several lawsuits from creditors, including the Associated Press, as well as two investors who claimed that Darling made misrepresentations to them when they were told they would be part of a general partnership to operate the station. The station was finally sold two years later to Second Generation, a Cleveland-based group, in a $4 million transaction. (Darling and his wife would be found guilty of bankruptcy fraud charges for filing fraudulent claims in connection with the WNPL sale in 1996.)

Upon Second Generation's acquisition of WNPL, which had become a charter affiliate of the United Paramount Network (UPN) when that network launched on January 16, the call letters were changed to WTVK on June 30. Second Generation also relocated the station's operations to the former WEVU studios in Bonita Bay, which offered more room and easier access to satellite feeds. In March 1998, Second Generation announced that the station would be sold to Acme Television for $15.5 million—nearly four times what it had paid three years earlier. Acme was part owned by Jamie Kellner, an executive for the competing WB network, and WTVK immediately became a WB affiliate. UPN moved to the market's previous WB affiliate, cable-only WSWF (later WNFM; now defunct). WTVK then adopted the on-air moniker "WB 6", after its cable channel location in the market.

On January 24, 2006, the merger of UPN and The WB into The CW was announced. Acme affiliated seven stations, including WTVK, with the new network that March; WNFM was left with MyNetworkTV and did not confirm their affiliation until August.

In May 2006, Joe Schwartzel's Sun Broadcasting agreed to acquire WTVK for $45 million; Schwartzel was also a co-owner of the Meridian Broadcasting radio group and a former general manager for WINK-TV (channel 11). The sale was completed on February 16, 2007, with the station subsequently changing its call sign to WXCW on March 2. Broadcast operations were subsequently relocated from Bonita Bay to Sun Broadcasting's facility on Palm Beach Boulevard near Downtown Fort Myers, operating alongside WINK-TV.

During the landfall of Hurricane Ian on September 28, 2022, the station's studio on Palm Beach Boulevard in downtown Fort Myers was inundated by storm surge flooding from nearby Billy Creek, knocking WXCW, WINK-TV, and their sister radio stations off the air. On September 30, both stations returned to the air from a makeshift studio at its transmitter site, with WXCW broadcasting the main WINK-TV schedule. Operations returned to the main facility after repairs a week later.

Hurricane Ian's impact on the station ultimately prompted the company to seek a new facility that would not be as susceptible to flooding. In mid-2023, the company purchased its current building on Corporate Lakes Drive in Gateway. After heavily renovating the building, WXCW and WINK-TV relocated to the new facility on January 12, 2026. Currently, MyNetworkTV programming airs following CW prime time programming on the main WXCW channel.

== Newscasts ==
As an independent station, from October 1991 to October 1992, WNPL operated a news department, producing a prime time newscast entitled Channel 46 Ten O'Clock News.

On March 26, 2007, WINK-TV began producing a half-hour prime time newscast for WXCW under a news share agreement. Right from the start, it emerged at a strong second place behind WFTX's longer-established and hour-long 10 p.m. newscast. On October 20, 2007, WINK-TV became the first station in Southwest Florida to begin broadcasting its local newscasts in high definition; the newscasts on WXCW were included in the upgrade. On January 7, 2008, WINK began producing a two-hour extension of its weekday morning newscast for WXCW, running from 7 to 9 a.m. The program was moved to WXCW, after WINK complied with CBS' new requirement for all of its affiliates to air its morning news program The Early Show (which was replaced by the revived CBS This Morning in January 2012) in its entirety. Originally, WINK-TV had preempted the first hour of that program due to the third hour of its weekday morning newscast, which was specifically titled as Hello Southwest Florida.

Beginning on October 31, 2008, the 10 p.m. newscast began to be presented commercial-free for the first 21 minutes of the broadcast. The 10 p.m. newscast was expanded to one hour on August 24, 2009. In the fall of 2010, WINK began producing a weekday 11 a.m. newscast on WXCW, that program has since been canceled until 2019. On September 16, 2013, the WINK-produced weekday morning newscast on the station was expanded by one hour, now running from 7 to 10 a.m.

In 2026, most WINK newscasts on WXCW were moved to Fox affiliate WFTX after Sun Broadcasting's acquisition of that station. The only exception as of 2026 is WINK's Sunday morning news at 9 a.m., which still airs on WXCW due to WINK airing CBS Sunday Morning and WFTX airing Fox News Sunday during that hour.

== Technical information ==
=== Subchannels ===
The station's signal is multiplexed:

Subchannels of WXCW
Subchannel	Res.	Short name	Programming
46.1	720p	SWFL CW	The CW/MyNetworkTV
46.2	720p	Laff	Laff/Scripps Sports
46.3	480i	UNIVSN	Univision (WUVF-LD)
46.4	Audio only	TRMP93	Simulcast of WHEL
46.5	Audio only	ARROW	Simulcast of WARO
46.6	Audio only	WINKFM	Simulcast of WINK-FM
46.7	Audio only	FLY98.5	Simulcast of WFFY
46.9	Audio only	WAVV	Simulcast of WAVV
46.10	Audio only	FOXNEWS	Simulcast of WFSX-FM

Simulcast of subchannels of another station

On August 13, 2012, WXCW launched MundoFox (later MundoMax) on a new digital subchannel 46.2. It is also available on Comcast digital cable channel 229 in standard definition and channel 437 in high definition. Once MundoMax ceased operations on December 1, 2016, the channel began to carry Estrella TV at 720p.

=== Analog-to-digital conversion ===
WXCW has been digital-only since February 17, 2009, which was the original date for TV stations to switch to digital, which was later pushed back to June 12, 2009.

== See also ==
- Channel 32 digital TV stations in the United States
- Channel 46 virtual TV stations in the United States
