= WRXK-FM =

Coordinates: 26.423°N 81.630°W

- Bonita Springs, Florida; United States
- Broadcast area: Fort Myers-Naples-Marco Island; Southwest Florida
- Frequency: 96.1 MHz (HD Radio)
- Branding: 96 K-Rock

Programming
- Format: Mainstream rock
- Affiliations: Miami Dolphins

Ownership
- Owner: Sun Broadcasting, Inc.
- Sister stations: WARO; WFFY; WFSX-FM; WFTX-TV; WHEL; WXCW; WXKB

History
- First air date: September 1, 1974
- Former call signs: WLEQ (1974–1986)
- Call sign meaning: Rock

Technical information
- Licensing authority: FCC
- Facility ID: 73976
- Class: C
- ERP: 100,000 watts
- HAAT: 341 meters (1,119 ft)

Links
- Public license information: Public file; LMS
- Webcast: Listen live
- Website: www.96krock.com

WRXK-FM (96.1 MHz) is a commercial radio station licensed to Bonita Springs, Florida, United States, and serving the Fort Myers-Naples-Marco Island area of Southwest Florida. It airs a mainstream rock format branded as "96 K-Rock." The studios are located at the Broadcast Center in Gateway.

The transmitter is located off Carter Road in Corkscrew, Florida. WRXK-FM broadcasts using HD Radio technology.

== History ==
The station signed on the air on September 1, 1974. Its original call sign was WLEQ with the branding "96 Super Q". It carried a Top 40 format. It originally broadcast on 95.9 MHz and was only powered at 3,000 watts, from a tower off Williams Road, south of Estero. In 1978, the station built and moved to a new 500 foot tower off US 41 North of Corkscrew Road. In 1980, the station was re-branded as "Q-96", and affiliated with the Satellite Music Network.

In 1986, the station switched frequencies from 95.9 to 96.1 coupled with a power increase to 100,000 watts. This allowed it to cover much of Southwest Florida. It switched to a mainstream rock format. It changed its call sign to WRXK and was rebranded as "96 K-Rock".

On February 13, 2012, WRXK-FM changed its format to hot talk, branded as "96 K-Rock, Talk That Rocks". It returned to rock on June 17, 2013, in preparation for sister station 99X's flip to ESPN Radio programming on June 20.

In the 2010s, WRXK-FM carried the syndicated Bubba the Love Sponge show in morning drive time. On July 9, 2018, the Beasley Broadcast Group parted ways with Bubba. WRXK-FM began airing Dave and Chuck the Freak. That show is based at co-owned WRIF in Detroit and is syndicated to Boston, Tampa and other markets.

On August 12, 2025, Beasley Media spun off the cluster in Fort Myers and sold half to Sun Broadcasting for $9 million. After receiving a waiver to exceed ownership limits in the market, the deal closed in February 2026. The format was kept mostly the same.
