= Suncoast Estates, Florida =

- Census-designated place
- Location in Lee County and the state of Florida
- Coordinates: 26°42′49″N 81°52′18″W
- Country: United States
- State: Florida
- County: Lee

Area
  - Total: 2.73 sq mi (7.08 km^{2})
  - Land: 2.72 sq mi (7.05 km^{2})
  - Water: 0.012 sq mi (0.03 km^{2}) 0.36%
- Elevation: 13 ft (4.0 m)

Population (2020)
  - Total: 4,097
  - Density: 1,505.9/sq mi (581.44/km^{2})
- Time zone: UTC-5 (Eastern (EST))
  - Summer (DST): UTC-4 (EDT)
- ZIP code: 33917
- Area code: 239
- FIPS code: 12-69275
- GNIS feature ID: 2402900

Suncoast Estates is a census-designated place (CDP) in Lee County, Florida, United States. The population was 4,097 at the 2020 census, down from 4,384 at the 2010 census. It is part of the Cape Coral-Fort Myers, Florida Metropolitan Statistical Area.

== Geography ==
Suncoast Estates is in northern Lee County and is nearly surrounded by unincorporated North Fort Myers. It is 6 miles (10 km) north of Fort Myers, the Lee county seat.

According to the United States Census Bureau, the CDP has a total area of 2.73 square miles (7.08 km^{2}), of which 2.72 square miles (7.05 km^{2}) are land and 0.01 square miles (0.03 km^{2}), or 0.42%, are water. The area drains south to the Caloosahatchee River.

== Demographics ==
Historical population
Census	Pop.	Note	%±
2000	4,867		—
2010	4,384		−9.9%
2020	4,097		−6.5%
U.S. Decennial Census

=== 2020 census ===
As of the 2020 census, Suncoast Estates had a population of 4,097. The median age was 43.3 years. 21.1% of residents were under the age of 18 and 16.4% of residents were 65 years of age or older. For every 100 females there were 111.0 males, and for every 100 females age 18 and over there were 110.0 males age 18 and over.

100.0% of residents lived in urban areas, while 0.0% lived in rural areas.

There were 1,531 households in Suncoast Estates, of which 25.3% had children under the age of 18 living in them. Of all households, 34.8% were married-couple households, 26.5% were households with a male householder and no spouse or partner present, and 25.0% were households with a female householder and no spouse or partner present. About 26.5% of all households were made up of individuals and 11.8% had someone living alone who was 65 years of age or older.

There were 1,918 housing units, of which 20.2% were vacant. The homeowner vacancy rate was 5.2% and the rental vacancy rate was 9.4%.

Racial composition as of the 2020 census
Race	Number	Percent
White	3,372	82.3%
Black or African American	31	0.8%
American Indian and Alaska Native	30	0.7%
Asian	21	0.5%
Native Hawaiian and Other Pacific Islander	0	0.0%
Some other race	250	6.1%
Two or more races	393	9.6%
Hispanic or Latino (of any race)	675	16.5%

=== 2000 census ===
As of the census of 2000, there were 4,867 people, 1,815 households, and 1,196 families residing in the CDP. The population density was 1,810.9 inhabitants per square mile (699.2/km^{2}). There were 2,107 housing units at an average density of 784.0 per square mile (302.7/km^{2}). The racial makeup of the CDP was 95.17% White, 0.64% African American, 0.84% Native American, 0.23% Asian, 1.95% from other races, and 1.17% from two or more races. Hispanic or Latino of any race were 5.86% of the population.

There were 1,815 households, out of which 32.5% had children under the age of 18 living with them, 43.6% were married couples living together, 15.1% had a female householder with no husband present, and 34.1% were non-families. 24.3% of all households were made up of individuals, and 7.7% had someone living alone who was 65 years of age or older. The average household size was 2.68 and the average family size was 3.15.

In the CDP, the population was spread out, with 28.6% under the age of 18, 7.6% from 18 to 24, 30.9% from 25 to 44, 21.0% from 45 to 64, and 11.9% who were 65 years of age or older. The median age was 35 years. For every 100 females, there were 108.9 males. For every 100 females age 18 and over, there were 107.3 males.

The median income for a household in the CDP was $26,510, and the median income for a family was $27,892. Males had a median income of $25,258 versus $15,570 for females. The per capita income for the CDP was $11,581. About 21.7% of families and 23.4% of the population were below the poverty line, including 28.4% of those under age 18 and 12.2% of those age 65 or over.
