= WTLQ-FM =

Coordinates: 26.488°N 81.929°W

- Punta Rassa, Florida; United States
- Broadcast area: Fort Myers, Florida
- Frequency: 97.7 MHz (HD Radio)
- Branding: 97.7 Latino

Programming
- Format: Hispanic urban
- Affiliations: Premiere Networks

Ownership
- Owner: Fort Myers Broadcasting Company (the McBride Family)
- Sister stations: WAVV; WINK-FM; WINK-TV; WJPT; WWCN

History
- First air date: 1999 (as WCCL)
- Former call signs: WWWD (1997–1998, CP); WCCL (1998–2000); WYPT (2000–2003)

Technical information
- Licensing authority: FCC
- Facility ID: 28901
- Class: C3
- ERP: 14,500 watts
- HAAT: 131 meters (430 ft)

Links
- Public license information: Public file; LMS
- Website: www.latino977.com

WTLQ-FM (97.7 MHz) is a commercial radio station located in Punta Rassa, Florida, broadcasting to the Fort Myers area. WTLQ-FM airs a hispanic urban music format branded as "Latino 97.7".

On October 5, 2022, after being off the air due to Hurricane Ian making landfall in the Fort Myers area, WTLQ-FM's format temporarily moved to WHEL (93.7). WTLQ-FM returned to the air on October 21, allowing WHEL to resume its regular country music programming.
