= WAVV =

Radio station in Naples Park, Florida

Coordinates: 26.183°N 81.575°W

- Naples Park, Florida; United States
- Broadcast area: Lee County, Florida; Collier Counties; Southwest Florida
- Frequency: 101.1 MHz (HD Radio)
- Branding: Wave 101.1

Programming
- Language: English
- Format: Soft adult contemporary
- Affiliations: USA Radio News

Ownership
- Owner: Fort Myers Broadcasting Company
- Sister stations: WINK-FM; WINK-TV; WJPT; WTLQ-FM; WWCN

History
- First air date: May 30, 1987
- Call sign meaning: "Wave"

Technical information
- Licensing authority: FCC
- Facility ID: 1154
- Class: C1
- ERP: 100,000 watts
- HAAT: 298.9 meters (981 ft)

Links
- Public license information: Public file; LMS
- Website: wavv101.com; HD2: laraza1079.com

WAVV (101.1 FM, "Wave 101.1") is a commercial radio station licensed to Naples Park, Florida. It serves Lee and Collier Counties, including the Fort Myers-Naples radio market. WAVV is owned by Fort Myers Broadcasting Company and it airs a soft adult contemporary radio format.

WAVV has an effective radiated power (ERP) of 100,000 watts, the maximum for non-grandfathered stations. The transmitter is off Benton Road in the Rural Estates neighborhood of Naples. WAVV broadcasts using HD Radio technology. The HD2 digital subchannel formerly played regional Mexican and fed FM translator W300EF at 107.9 MHz in Naples. The HD3 digital subchannel formerly played contemporary Christian and fed FM translator W272BM at 102.3 MHz in Fort Myers Beach. The HD subchannels have since been turned off.

== History ==
=== Early years ===
In the 1980s, Naples resident Norman Alpert received a construction permit from the Federal Communications Commission to build a new FM station in Southwest Florida. On May 30, 1987, WAVV signed on the air. The station's original city of license was Marco. The studios were on Tamiami Trail East in Naples.

A satellite office was set up in Fort Myers on Colonial Boulevard, later moving to Royal Palm Square, and then to South Tamiami Trail. Around 2008, WAVV changed its city of license, now listed as Naples Park, Florida.

=== Easy listening ===
WAVV's playlist was originally a 50/50 mix of middle of the road vocals and instrumental cover songs. It carries USA Radio News at the beginning of some hours. Weather forecasts came from WBBH-TV. On Sunday mornings, WAVV plays smooth jazz, known as the "Sunday Champagne Jazz Brunch". WAVV's website says it has been the most listened-to radio station in Southwest Florida for nearly a quarter century.

WAVV is the only locally owned independent commercial FM radio station in Southwest Florida and was one of the last in the U.S. to broadcast an easy listening format. The station was owned and operated by the Alpert Family until 2022, with Donna Alpert named Chief Financial Officer in the early 2000s.

On June 21, 2022, Alpine Broadcasting sold WAVV to Fort Myers Broadcasting Company for $8 million. The sale was consummated on September 8, 2022.

=== Streaming and HD Radio ===
Effective March 2, 2009, WAVV ceased streaming live on the internet. Streaming returned in June 2011. WAVV began broadcasting using HD Radio technology in May 2008. Effective August 15, 2013, WAVV again ceased streaming, but in 2019 the stream returned.

In May 2016, WAVV began broadcasting a locally programmed oldies format on its HD2 subchannel, called "The Second Wave".

In December 2019, WAVV changed its slogan to "Modern Relaxing Favorites" and shifted its format to soft adult contemporary. The previous format moved to HD2, replacing oldies.

In late January 2020, WAVV stopped streaming "The Second Wave" (HD2). The HD2 subchannel returned to live streaming and also began airing on FM translator W300EF at 107.9 MHz by September 2021. It played easy listening music as "Easy 107.9". The playlist was a mix of instrumentals and soft vocals.

On May 5, 2023, WAVV-HD2/W300EF changed its format from easy listening to smooth jazz, branded as "Smooth Jazz 107.9".
