= Gateway, Florida =

- CDP
- Location in Lee County and the state of Florida
- Coordinates: 26°34′48″N 81°45′00″W
- Country: United States
- State: Florida
- County: Lee

Area
  - Total: 5.90 sq mi (15.27 km^{2})
  - Land: 5.37 sq mi (13.90 km^{2})
  - Water: 0.53 sq mi (1.37 km^{2})
- Elevation: 20 ft (6.1 m)

Population (2020)
  - Total: 10,376
  - Density: 1,933.2/sq mi (746.43/km^{2})
- Time zone: UTC-5 (Eastern (EST))
  - Summer (DST): UTC-4 (EDT)
- ZIP Code: 33913
- Area code: 239
- FIPS code: 12-25655
- GNIS feature ID: 2402518

Gateway is a census-designated place (CDP) in Lee County, Florida, United States. The population was 10,376 at the 2020 census, up from 8,401 at the 2010 United States census. It is part of the Cape Coral-Fort Myers, Florida Metropolitan Statistical Area. The community is located north of Southwest Florida International Airport.

== Geography ==
According to the United States Census Bureau, the CDP has a total area of 6.14 square miles (15.9 km^{2}), of which 5.65 square miles (14.6 km^{2}) is land and 0.49 square miles (1.3 km^{2}) is water.

== Demographics ==
Historical population
Census	Pop.	Note	%±
2000	2,943		—
2010	8,401		185.5%
2020	10,376		23.5%

=== 2020 census ===
As of the 2020 census, Gateway had a population of 10,376. The median age was 44.9 years. 19.9% of residents were under the age of 18 and 23.2% of residents were 65 years of age or older. For every 100 females there were 95.5 males, and for every 100 females age 18 and over there were 92.5 males age 18 and over.

93.9% of residents lived in urban areas, while 6.1% lived in rural areas.

There were 4,132 households in Gateway, of which 28.0% had children under the age of 18 living in them. Of all households, 63.1% were married-couple households, 12.0% were households with a male householder and no spouse or partner present, and 18.6% were households with a female householder and no spouse or partner present. About 19.9% of all households were made up of individuals and 8.8% had someone living alone who was 65 years of age or older.

There were 4,776 housing units, of which 13.5% were vacant. The homeowner vacancy rate was 1.9% and the rental vacancy rate was 14.4%.

Racial composition as of the 2020 census
Race	Number	Percent
White	8,019	77.3%
Black or African American	497	4.8%
American Indian and Alaska Native	17	0.2%
Asian	330	3.2%
Native Hawaiian and Other Pacific Islander	1	0.0%
Some other race	350	3.4%
Two or more races	1,162	11.2%
Hispanic or Latino (of any race)	1,409	13.6%

=== 2010 census ===
As of the 2010 United States census, there were 8,401 people living in the CDP. The population density was 1,486.9 inhabitants per square mile (574.1/km^{2}). There were 4,108 housing units at an average density of 727.1 per square mile (280.7/km^{2}). The racial makeup of the CDP was 87.6% White, 9.3% Black, 2.0% Asian, and 0.9% from two or more races. Hispanic or Latino of any race were 9.5% of the population.

=== Income and poverty ===
The median income for a household in the CDP was $83,583 and the per capita income for the CDP was $37,682. About 6.1% of the population were below the poverty line.

== Education ==
- Gateway Charter High School
- Gateway Elementary and Intermediate Charter School K-8
