= WINK-FM =

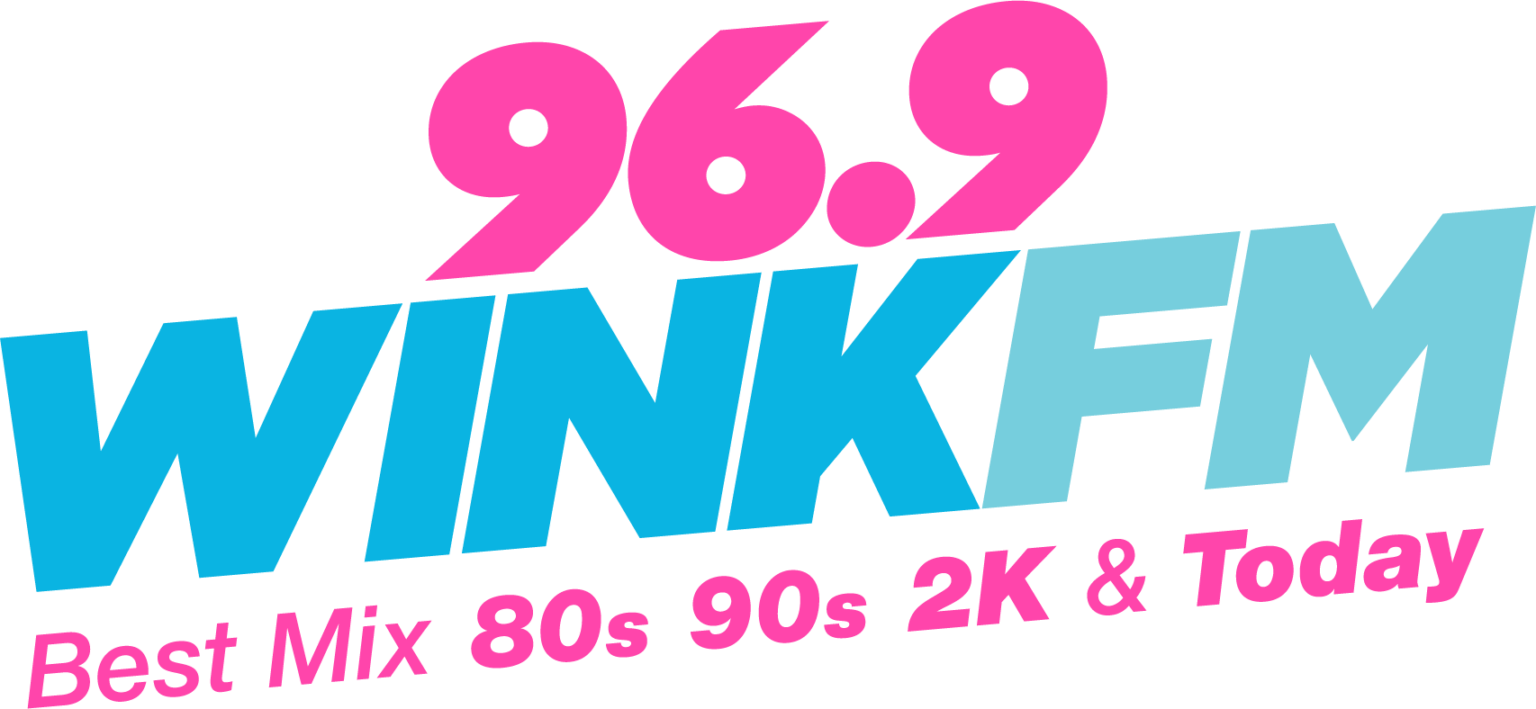
- Fort Myers, Florida; United States
- Broadcast area: Southwest Florida
- Frequency: 96.9 MHz (HD Radio)
- Branding: 96.9 WINK FM

Programming
- Format: Adult contemporary
- Subchannels: HD2: Máxima 97.3 y 95.7 (Spanish contemporary)

Ownership
- Owner: Fort Myers Broadcasting Company (McBride Family)
- Sister stations: WAVV; WINK-TV; WJPT; WTLQ-FM; WWCN

History
- First air date: October 8, 1964
- Call sign meaning: The word "wink"

Technical information
- Licensing authority: FCC
- Facility ID: 22094
- Class: C
- ERP: 100,000 watts
- HAAT: 453 meters (1,486 ft)
- Transmitter coordinates: 26°48′02.8″N 81°45′44.3″W
- Translators: HD2: 97.3 W247CR (Pine Island Center); HD2: 95.7 W239CL (Golden Gate)

Links
- Public license information: Public file; LMS
- Webcast: Listen live
- Website: winkfm.com; HD2: musicaalmaximo.com

WINK-FM (96.9 MHz) is a commercial radio station in Fort Myers, Florida, United States. The station airs an adult contemporary radio format. It is owned by the Fort Myers Broadcasting Company, locally controlled by the McBride Family, which also owns WINK-TV. WINK-FM has studios and offices on Palm Beach Boulevard (S.R. 80) in Fort Myers.

The transmitter is located on Freeland Lane, off Florida State Road 31 in North Fort Myers, Florida. Its effective radiated power (ERP) is 100,000 watts, sharing a tower with WINK-TV at 453 meters (1,486 feet) in height above average terrain, taller than the Empire State Building. This allows WINK-FM to be clearly heard as far north as Hardee County, as far south as the Everglades and as far east as Okeechobee County. WINK-FM can also be heard on Channel 11.6, a subchannel of WINK-TV.

WINK-FM broadcasts using HD Radio technology. The HD2 digital subchannel carries a Spanish-language contemporary format known as "Máxima 97.3 y 95.7". It feeds two FM translators: 97.3 W247CR in Pine Island Center and 95.7 W239CL in Golden Gate.

== History ==
On October 8, 1964, WINK-FM signed on the air. It was the FM counterpart to WINK (1240 AM, later WFSX) and WINK-TV. At first, WINK-FM simulcast the AM station's middle of the road format of adult pop music, news and sports. By the late 1960s, WINK-FM was playing beautiful music, as it ended the simulcast with the AM.

Over time, WINK-FM added more vocals until it made the transition flip to a Top 40/CHR format in 1980 as "97-Rock", which would later change its branding to "WINK-FM 97" in 1984. Its branding was updated as “WINK 96.9” in 1991, and in 1993, the station had evolved into a hot adult contemporary format.

On May 6, 2013, at 10 a.m., after promoting that morning that "WINK-FM will be a thing of the past", the format switched from hot adult contemporary to adult contemporary, branded as "96.9 More FM". In October 2015, the station went back to the "96.9 WINK FM" branding, retaining the adult contemporary format.
