= WINK-TV =

Television station in Fort Myers, Florida

- Fort Myers–Naples, Florida; United States
- City: Fort Myers, Florida
- Channels: Digital: 31 (UHF); Virtual: 11
- Branding: WINK; WINK News

Programming
- Affiliations: 11.1: CBS; 11.2: Antenna TV; 11.3: Weather radar/WAVV audio/Miami Heat games

Ownership
- Owner: Fort Myers Broadcasting Company
- Sister stations: WFTX-TV, WXCW, WUVF-LD / WLZE-LD, WANA-LD

History
- First air date: March 18, 1954
- Former channel numbers: Analog: 11 (VHF, 1954–2009); Digital: 9 (VHF, 2007–2011), 50 (UHF, 2011–2020)
- Former affiliations: All secondary: DuMont (1954–1955); NBC (1954–1968); ABC (1954–1974)
- Call sign meaning: From former radio sister WINK; calls pre-date introduction of CBS Eyemark logo

Technical information
- Licensing authority: FCC
- Facility ID: 22093
- ERP: 793 kW
- HAAT: 416 m (1,365 ft)
- Transmitter coordinates: 26°48′2.8″N 81°45′44.3″W

Links
- Public license information: Public file; LMS
- Website: www.winknews.com

WINK-TV (channel 11) is a television station licensed to Fort Myers, Florida, United States, serving as the CBS affiliate for Southwest Florida. It is owned by the McBride family and their Fort Myers Broadcasting Company and operated alongside Fox affiliate WFTX-TV (channel 36), CW/MyNetworkTV affiliate WXCW (channel 46), low-power Univision affiliate WUVF-LD (channel 2), and low-power WANA-LD (channel 18). The stations share studios on Corporate Lakes Drive in Gateway; WINK-TV's transmitter is located north of Fort Myers Shores, near the Charlotte–Lee county line.

== History ==
The station began broadcasting on March 18, 1954, owned by the family of taxicab magnate and Cleveland Browns founder Mickey McBride along with WINK (1240 AM). WINK-TV was the first television station in Southwest Florida and is the fifth-oldest surviving station in the state. Although the call letters appear to be an outgrowth of its CBS affiliation, in fact they were simply carried over from its radio sister, which adopted them in 1944—seven years before the CBS Eye made its first appearance. It carried programming from the four major networks of its era: CBS, NBC, ABC and DuMont in the first two decades of its existence. However, it has always been a primary CBS affiliate.

Channel 11 lost DuMont when that network ended operations in 1956. In December 1968, WINK-TV finally gained a local competitor when WBBH-TV signed on and took the NBC affiliation. The two stations continued to share ABC until WEVU-TV signed on in 1974. However, viewers could watch the full ABC and NBC schedules via stations from Miami–Fort Lauderdale, West Palm Beach and Tampa–St. Petersburg, which were and continue to be available with outdoor antennas.

WINK-TV was a major beneficiary of a quirk in the Federal Communications Commission (FCC)'s plan for allocating stations. In the early days of broadcast television, there were twelve VHF channels available and 69 UHF channels (later reduced to 55 in 1983). The VHF bands were more desirable because they carried longer distances. Since there were only twelve VHF channels available, there were limitations as to how closely the stations could be spaced.

After the FCC's Sixth Report and Order ended the license freeze and opened the UHF band in 1952, it devised a plan for allocating VHF licenses. Under this plan, almost all of the country would be able to receive two commercial VHF channels plus one noncommercial channel. Most of the rest of the country ("1/2") would be able to receive a third VHF channel. Other areas would be designated as "UHF islands" since they were too close to larger cities for VHF service. The "2" networks became CBS and NBC, "+1" represented non-commercial educational stations, and "1/2" became ABC (which was the weakest network then usually winding up with the UHF allocation where no VHF was available).

However, Fort Myers is sandwiched between Miami–Fort Lauderdale (channels 2, 4, 6, 7 and 10) and West Palm Beach (channels 5 and 12) to the east and Tampa Bay (channels 3, 8, 10, and 13) to the north. This created a large doughnut in southwest Florida where there could be only one VHF license. WINK-TV was fortunate to gain that license, and as a result was the only local station that provided a clear picture to outlying portions of the market until cable television arrived in the mid-1970s. Although there was no station on channel 9 in the immediate area, it was occupied in Orlando, which was too close to Fort Myers to reallocate.

The station has identified almost exclusively with its call letters since the mid-1980s. This is due in large part to the extremely high penetration of cable and satellite in Southwest Florida—one of the highest in the nation. Cable and satellite are all but essential for acceptable television reception in much of the market, even in the digital age.

On October 20, 2007, WINK-TV became the first television station in Southwest Florida to begin broadcasting in high definition. In January 2008, several programming changes were made on WINK-TV. It began airing The Early Show in its entirety after CBS began requiring all of its affiliates to air the full two-hour broadcast of the program.

During the landfall of Hurricane Ian on September 28, 2022, the station's studio on Palm Beach Boulevard in downtown Fort Myers was inundated by storm surge flooding from nearby Billy Creek, knocking WINK-TV, WXCW and their sister radio stations off the air. On September 30, WINK-TV returned to the air from a makeshift studio at its transmitter site, though using WXCW's main channel to broadcast the WINK-TV schedule. Operations returned to the main facility after repairs a week later.

Hurricane Ian's impact on the station ultimately prompted the company to seek a new facility that would not be as susceptible to flooding. In mid-2023, the company purchased its current building on Corporate Lakes Drive in Gateway. After heavily renovating the building, WINK-TV relocated to the new facility on January 12, 2026.

== News operation ==
WINK-TV presently broadcasts 46 hours of locally produced newscasts each week (with 7 1/2 hours each weekday, 3 1/2 hours on Saturdays and five hours on Sundays). The McBrides devote significant resources to channel 11's news operation. WINK was the market leader until WBBH briefly surpassed it in the 1970s. WINK pulled back ahead in the 1980s and has been battling WBBH for first place ever since.

WINK-TV operates two news bureaus: the Charlotte County Bureau in the Charlotte Sun newsroom in Charlotte Harbor and the Collier County Bureau in Naples. The Boston Red Sox have held spring training in Fort Myers since 1993, and WINK-TV shares its coverage of the team with fellow CBS station WBZ-TV in Boston.

On May 26, 2011, WINK-TV debuted an hour-long 4 p.m. newscast, one of many added on television stations around the United States on that date to replace The Oprah Winfrey Show, which ended its 25-year run the day before. On June 11, 2011, WINK-TV debuted a 90-minute morning newscast on Saturday and Sunday mornings. WINK-TV also added a half-hour late morning newscast at 10 a.m. on September 6, 2011 (which was later dropped). On September 16, 2013, WINK-TV expanded its weekday morning newscast a half-hour early to 4:30 a.m. and expanded the extension of that program on WXCW by one hour to 7 to 10 a.m. In January 2015, WINK-TV expanded the 6:30 p.m. newscast to weekends on WXCW. Most newscasts on WXCW were moved to Fox affiliate WFTX-TV in 2026 after Sun Broadcasting's acquisition of that station.

Notable former staff include Hoda Kotb (1989–1991), Craig Sager, Trey Radel, Kerry Sanders, and Randy Scott.

== Technical information ==
=== Subchannels ===
The station's signal is multiplexed, with WINK-DT3 used to simulcast the audio of sister station WAVV during Weather Radar Programming:

Subchannels of WINK-TV
Subchannel	Res.	Short name	Programming
11.1	1080i	WINKCBS	CBS
11.2	480i	Antenna	Antenna TV (4:3)
11.3	1080i	WINK3	Weather radar/WAVV audio/ Miami Heat games

WINK-TV operates the Naples–Fort Myers market's Antenna TV affiliate on its DT2 subchannel (as of March 1, 2019), replacing a standard definition simulcast of the primary/CBS feed that had been airing over that subchannel since 2016, that simulcast having replaced an affiliation with a 24/7 Weather service that aired over WINK-DT2 between 2012 and 2015. In March of 2019, WINK-DT2 began carrying the MyNetworkTV programming service on weeknights, filling in programming for all time slots outside of the MyNetworkTV programming schedule with the Antenna TV schedule; the March 2019 relaunch of WINK-DT2 as a dual Antenna TV/MyNetworkTV affiliate restored in-market access to the MyNetworkTV programming service to southwest Florida for the first time since Comcast's July 1, 2015, closure of former cable-exclusive dual MyNetworkTV/This TV affiliate, WNFM-TV. The MyNetworkTV affiliation has since moved to sister station WXCW following CW prime time programming.

=== Analog-to-digital conversion ===
WINK has been digital-only since February 17, 2009. It moved its digital signal to UHF channel 50 in mid-2011.

== Out-of-market cable coverage ==
WINK-TV is one of two Fort Myers stations carried by Xfinity in Venice and Wauchula. It is the only Southwest Florida-based station carried on Xfinity's Sebring system.
