= WFTX-TV =

Television station in Cape Coral, Florida

- Cape Coral–Fort Myers–Naples, Florida; United States
- City: Cape Coral, Florida
- Channels: Digital: 34 (UHF); Virtual: 36
- Branding: Fox Florida

Programming
- Affiliations: 36.1: Fox; for others, see § Subchannels

Ownership
- Owner: Sun Broadcasting, Inc.
- Operator: Fort Myers Broadcasting Company
- Sister stations: WINK-TV, WXCW, WUVF-LD, WLZE-LD, WANA-LD

History
- First air date: October 14, 1985
- Former channel numbers: Analog: 36 (UHF, 1985–2009); Digital: 35 (UHF, 2001–2020)
- Former affiliations: Independent (1985–1987)
- Call sign meaning: Variation on formerly co-owned WFTS-TV in Tampa

Technical information
- Licensing authority: FCC
- Facility ID: 70649
- ERP: 1,000 kW
- HAAT: 391 m (1,283 ft)
- Transmitter coordinates: 26°47′39.7″N 81°48′4″W

Links
- Public license information: Public file; LMS
- Website: www.winknews.com

WFTX-TV (channel 36, cable channel 4), branded as Fox Florida, is a television station licensed to Cape Coral, Florida, United States, serving as the Fox affiliate for Southwest Florida. It is owned by Sun Broadcasting, which together with Fort Myers Broadcasting Company owns and operates CBS affiliate WINK-TV (channel 11), CW affiliate WXCW (channel 46), and 12 local radio stations. The stations share studios on Corporate Lakes Drive in Gateway. WFTX-TV's transmitter is located northeast of Fort Myers near Babcock Ranch.

Channel 36 went on the air on October 14, 1985, as the market's first independent station. It was founded by Family Group Broadcasting, which had previously built Tampa's WFTS-TV, and was sold within a year to Wabash Valley Broadcasting, an Indiana firm that expanded into TV station ownership in Florida. In 1987, it affiliated with Fox, and in 1993, it began airing local news programming. Wabash Valley sold its stations to Emmis Communications in 1998, marking that company's foray into television.

Journal Broadcast Group acquired WFTX in 2005 and expanded the station's local news programming with a weekday morning newscast and additional evening news coverage. This continued under the E. W. Scripps Company, which acquired Journal in 2014. In 2026, Scripps sold WFTX-TV to Sun Broadcasting, leading to the end of its separate news department and absorption into common operation with WINK-TV and WXCW.

== History ==
=== Early years ===
The Federal Communications Commission (FCC) allocated channel 36 to Cape Coral, Florida, effective June 4, 1982. Broadcast Production and Management Corporation of Florida, which had proposed the channel assignment to the FCC the year prior, also filed for the channel. It proposed a daytime business news format during daytime hours. Also seeking the channel were Florida Family Broadcasting Ltd., South Jersey Radio Inc., and Coastal Telecasting Corporation. In 1984, out of the four applications, an FCC administrative law judge gave the nod to Florida Family Broadcasting Limited, which included one Native American and one Asian investor, over the other three groups. Florida Family—a company associated with Family Group Broadcasting, which two years prior had signed on WFTS-TV in Tampa—had to settle with the other applicants, a process that look longer than expected.

Construction work began in April 1985 on a broadcast facility on Pine Island Road in Cape Coral. After a prolonged construction marked by delays due to high winds, WFTX-TV started broadcasting on October 14, 1985, from temporary studios at its transmitter site. It was the first independent station in Southwest Florida, and from the start, it aired on channel 4 on most systems. Within a year of building WFTX-TV, Family Group sold it for $17 million to Terre Haute, Indiana–based Wabash Valley Broadcasting, controlled by the family of Tony Hulman. Wabash Valley, which owned WTHI-TV in its home town of Terre Haute, had also agreed to purchase WBSP-TV in Ocala earlier that year.

Shortly after the sale, in 1987, WFTX-TV began using the Pine Island facility as its studio. That year, the station affiliated with Fox—partly to prevent new independent WNPL-TV (channel 46) from doing so—and extended its coverage north with an increase in tower height. It pitched ABC on defecting from its affiliate, perennial third-place station WEVU-TV, in 1988. Under Wabash Valley, the station tightened its focus on viewers aged 18–49, dropping afternoon cartoons in favor of programming aimed at young adults, and developed a line of business in producing commercials for local advertisers.

On September 10, 1988, WFTX-TV debuted its first local program, the weekly public affairs show Florida Focus. It was hosted by Pete Scovill and featured a consumer segment called "Troubleshooter". Six months later, Troubleshooter became a daily half-hour program, covering crime, consumer and investigative stories. By 1991, it was the leading program in its 5:30 p.m. time slot, drawing more viewers than either of The Oprah Winfrey Show, ABC World News Tonight, and WINK-TV (channel 11)'s 5:30 p.m. newscast.

=== Starting a news department and sale to Emmis ===
In September 1992, WFTX announced it would produce a local newscast beginning in 1993. Market studies found room for a fourth TV newsroom in the Southwest Florida market, and without a newscast, WFTX-TV missed out on the 20 percent of advertising revenue in local TV destined to news programs. Wabash Valley added 31 employees and invested $3 million to start the operation. The first 10 p.m. newscast aired on October 10, 1993, with Scovill serving as the lead anchor. In its first year, the Associated Press selected WFTX as having the best medium-market newscast in the state of Florida. A 6 p.m. program was added in 1995, incorporating the previously separate Troubleshooter show.

In 1998, Emmis Communications purchased the assets of Wabash Valley Broadcasting, one of two concurrent acquisitions giving the company its first television stations. Shortly after taking over, the station lost its general manager and news director, who resigned citing "differences" with Emmis; troubleshooter reporter Thomas Roberts was reassigned to an anchor position in a second wave of cutbacks. By June 1999, the station was known as Fox 4, after its cable television channel number, and its newscasts as Fox 4 News. Low ratings prompted the cancellation of the 6 p.m. newscast in June 2000. From 2002 to 2005, WFTX's master control and other internal operations were controlled from a regional hub located at the company's WKCF in Lake Mary, near Orlando.

=== Journal and Scripps ownership ===
Emmis exited the television business in 2005, with Journal Broadcast Group acquiring WFTX and two other stations. A morning newscast had been discussed for WFTX under Emmis, and it launched in June 2006 as Fox4 Rising. The station relaunched a 6 p.m. show in 2010.

On July 30, 2014, it was announced that the E. W. Scripps Company would acquire Journal Communications in an all-stock transaction and spin off the combined company's print assets. The FCC approved the deal on December 12, 2014, and shareholders followed suit on March 11, 2015; the merger was completed on April 1.

By August 2025, WFTX-TV broadcast 44 1/2 hours a week of news programming.

=== Sun Broadcasting ownership and common operation with WINK-TV ===
On September 3, 2025, Scripps announced it planned to sell WFTX-TV to Sun Broadcasting in a $40 million deal. Sun Broadcasting, owner of CW affiliate WXCW (channel 46), and the Fort Myers Broadcasting Company (FMBC), owner of WINK-TV, have a complex relationship whereby Sun rents space and purchases shared services from FMBC, and some employees are paid by both companies. This partnership, which also includes commonly operated radio clusters, has long been acknowledged as effectively creating a single entity whose total holdings would otherwise exceed FCC ownership limits. In 2006, then-WFTX owner Journal had unsuccessfully filed with the FCC to stop Sun Broadcasting from acquiring channel 46. Sun Broadcasting's original owner, Joe Schwartzel, was a former general manager of FMBC, and a sister company to Sun, Meridian Broadcasting, was already sharing resources with FMBC in radio.

The sale of WFTX to Sun was completed on March 2, 2026. WFTX broadcast operations relocated from Cape Coral to WXCW and WINK's broadcast facility in Gateway the next day, and the station began airing WINK newscasts. WFTX's news staff were also brought into WINK's news operation.

== Notable former on-air staff ==
- Cindy Preszler — meteorologist
- Thomas Roberts – Troubleshooter reporter and anchor, late 1990s
- Michelle Tuzee — anchor/reporter, 1993

== Technical information and subchannels ==
WFTX-TV's transmitter is located northeast of Fort Myers near Babcock Ranch. The station's signal is multiplexed:

Subchannels of WFTX-TV
Subchannel	Res.	Short name	Programming
36.1	720p	WFTX-DT	Fox
36.2	480i	BOUNCE	Bounce TV
36.3	720p	Grit	Grit
36.5	480i	ION	Ion
36.6	480i	Mystery	Ion Mystery
36.7	480i	QVC	QVC
36.8	480i	CourtTV	Court TV

WFTX-TV began digital telecasts on channel 35 on July 1, 2001. It ceased analog broadcasting on the digital television transition date of June 12, 2009. WFTX was the last of the major commercial stations in Fort Myers to switch, as most other stations changed over on February 17. The station's digital signal continued to broadcast on its pre-transition UHF channel 35.

WFTX relocated its signal from channel 35 to channel 34 in 2020, as a result of the 2016 United States wireless spectrum auction.

On August 29, 2024, WFTX announced that all non-national Florida Panthers games would air on its third subchannel.

== See also ==
- Channel 4 branded TV stations in the United States
- Channel 34 digital TV stations in the United States
- Channel 36 virtual TV stations in the United States
