= Conker =

Conker may refer to:

== Horse chestnuts ==
- The seed of the horse chestnut, Aesculus hippocastanum
- Conkers, a traditional children's game, using the seed threaded on a string

== Video games ==
- Conker (series), a video game franchise by Rare
  - Conker's Pocket Tales, the first solo game in the series
  - Conker's Bad Fur Day, the second game in the series
  - Conker: Live & Reloaded, an Xbox remake of the second game
  - Conker the Squirrel, the main character in the series

== Other ==
- Conkeror, a web browser
- Conkerberry, the plant Carissa spinarum
