= WKNK =

- Callaway, Florida; United States
- Broadcast area: Panama City, Florida
- Frequency: 103.5 MHz
- Branding: Radio Fe

Programming
- Format: Spanish Christian

Ownership
- Owner: Faith Radio Network, Inc.
- Sister stations: WASJ, WLTG, WPCF

History
- First air date: October 12, 1989 (as WXDZ)
- Former call signs: WXDZ (1989–1989); WBKL (1989–1991); WDRK (1991–1997); WMXP (1997–2004); WAKT-FM (2004–2012)
- Call sign meaning: From "Kick'n Country" format in 2012

Technical information
- Licensing authority: FCC
- Facility ID: 42371
- Class: C1
- ERP: 100,000 watts
- HAAT: 129 meters (423 ft)
- Transmitter coordinates: 30°10′51.00″N 85°29′45.00″W

Links
- Public license information: Public file; LMS
- Webcast: Listen live
- Website: faithradio.us/

WKNK (103.5 FM) is a radio station broadcasting a Spanish Christian format. Licensed to Callaway, Florida, United States, the station serves the Panama City area. The station is currently owned by the Faith Radio Network.

== History ==
WKNK first signed on on 12 October 1989 as WXDZ. On 5 December of the same year, its call sign was changed to WBKL. WBKL, known as "Cool 103.5", was an oldies station. On 6 December 1991, WBKL became WDRK, and billed itself as "Rock 103". It was a modern- and alternative-rock oriented station.

This lasted until 21 November 1997, when its call sign was again changed, this time to WMXP, and was known as "Mix 103". In 2000, the station changed its format to Soft Rock, and its branding to "Lite Rock 103.5". In 2002, WAKT (then a country station) and WMXP traded formats, WMXP rebranding itself to "Max Country 103.5".

On 10 Mar 2004, Max Country 103 became Kat Country and its call sign was changed to WAKT-FM. In 2009, WAKT-FM switched over to Hank FM branding, which lasted until 2012.

On 9 October 2012, its call sign was changed to WKNK and its branding to "Kick'n Country 103.5". Until 2018, WKNK featured "The Gulf Coast Morning Show with Flip & Streeter". Personalities included Melissa Miller, Brad McKay and Jay Arthur, with additional programming from Premiere Radio Networks and Westwood One.

On 10 October 2018, Hurricane Michael destroyed the facilities of Powell Broadcasting, then-owner of WKNK, WASJ, WPFM, and WRBA. After WKNK, WASJ, and WRBA were purchased by Gulf Coast Broadcasting in December 2018 (WPFM was sold to EMF), WKNK was the first to go back on the air on 23 January 2019, under the Hank FM moniker. The sale to Gulf Coast Broadcasting was consummated on April 30, 2019, at a price of $325,000.

On July 3, 2019, Gulf Coast Broadcasting sold WKNK, WASJ, and WRBA to Great American Media for $700,000. The sale was consummated on September 26, 2019.

In February 2020, the Hank FM name was dropped and it was once again rebranded to "Kickin' Country 103.5".

Effective July 1, 2022, Great American Media sold WKNK, WASJ, and WRBA to Roberta Fagan's RoRo Investments for $180,000.

WKNK and sister WASJ were sold to the Tallahassee-based Faith Radio Network in March 2025. The station would flip from the Kick'n Country format to Faith Radio's Spanish-language programming later that month, effectively simulcasting WLTG.
