= WASJ =

Coordinates: 30.179°N 85.782°W

- Panama City Beach, Florida; United States
- Broadcast area: Panama City, Florida
- Frequency: 105.1 MHz
- Branding: Faith Radio

Programming
- Format: Contemporary Christian

Ownership
- Owner: Faith Radio Network, Inc.
- Sister stations: WLTG, WKNK, WPCF

History
- First air date: January 1993 (as WAKT)
- Former call signs: WSEA (1991–1993); WAKT (1993–2002)
- Call sign meaning: W All Smooth Jazz [former format]

Technical information
- Licensing authority: FCC
- Facility ID: 63585
- Class: C2
- ERP: 50,000 watts
- HAAT: 102 meters (335 ft)

Links
- Public license information: Public file; LMS
- Webcast: Listen live
- Website: faithradio.us/

WASJ (105.1 FM, "Faith Radio") is a radio station broadcasting a Christian music format. Licensed to Panama City Beach, Florida, United States, the station is currently owned by the Faith Radio Network.

== History ==
The station began broadcasting in 1991 under the call sign WSEA. The station was virtually silent until January 1993, when it began holding the call sign WAKT. The station aired a country music format and was branded "Kat Kountry 105.1".

In 2002, after switching formats with WMXP, the station's call sign was changed to WASJ. The station adopted a smooth jazz format and was branded "Smooth Jazz 105.1".

In January 2008, the station switched to a sports format, as an affiliate of ESPN Radio.

In May 2008, the station adopted an adult hits format as "Bob FM".

In the aftermath of Hurricane Michael, Powell Broadcasting announced that it would cease operation of its Panama City stations, leaving the future of its licenses in the market in limbo.

WASJ and its two sisters were sold in December 2018 to Gulf Coast Broadcasting, and WASJ returned to the air the next month, continuing the "Bob FM" adult hits format. The sale was consummated on April 30, 2019 at a price of $325,000.

On July 3, 2019, Gulf Coast Broadcasting sold WASJ, WRBA, and WKNK to Great American Media for $700,000. The sale was consummated on September 26, 2019.

Effective July 1, 2022, Great American Media sold WASJ, WKNK, and WRBA to Roberta Fagan's RoRo Investments for $180,000.

WASJ and sister WKNK were sold to the Tallahassee-based Faith Radio Network in March 2025. The station would flip from the Bob FM format to Faith Radio's English-language programming on March 11, 2025.
