= WFRF =

WFRF can refer to:

- WFRF (AM), a radio station (1070 AM) licensed to Tallahassee, Florida, United States
- WFRF-FM, a radio station (105.7 FM) licensed to Monticello, Florida, United States
