= Larry Burkett =

American writer and radio personality (1939–2003)

- Born: March 3, 1939; Winter Park, Florida, U.S.
- Died: July 4, 2003 (aged 64); Gainesville, Georgia, U.S.
- Occupations: Author, radio personality

Larry Burkett (March 3, 1939 – July 4, 2003) was an American radio personality whose work focused on financial counseling from a Christian point of view.

== Biography ==
Burkett was born the fifth of eight children. After completing high school in Winter Garden, Florida, he entered the U.S. Air Force where he served in the Strategic Air Command.

Upon completion of his military duties, Burkett and his wife Judy returned to central Florida, where he worked in the space program at Cape Canaveral. He spent the next several years at the Space Center in charge of an experimental test facility that served the Mercury-, Gemini-, and Apollo-crewed space programs. While working at the space center, Burkett earned degrees in marketing and finance at Rollins College.

Burkett left the Space Center in 1970 to become vice president of an electronics manufacturing firm. In 1972, he became an evangelical Christian, an event that had a profound effect on his life. In 1973, he left the electronics company to join the staff of the nonprofit Campus Crusade for Christ, as a financial counselor where he met Austin Pryor, Ron Blue and other financial experts. He began an intense study of biblical teaching about handling money, and he started teaching small groups around the country.

Burkett left the campus ministry in 1976 to form Christian Financial Concepts (CFC), a nonprofit organization dedicated to teaching the biblical principles of handling money. In September 2000, CFC merged with Crown Ministries, creating a new organization, Crown Financial Ministries. Burkett served as chairman of the board of directors until his death. Burkett was also a co-founder of the Alliance Defense Fund, a Christian conservative legal advocacy organization. Burkett also co-founded the National Christian Foundation.

Burkett died of heart failure after a long battle with cancer and other health problems.

== Works ==
Burkett published more than 70 books, sales of which now exceed 11 million copies and include several national best-sellers. The three radio programs that he began -- "Money Matters," "How to Manage Your Money," and "MoneyWatch," along with a series of short features titled "A Money Minute"—have been carried on more than 1,100 radio outlets worldwide. (Crown Financial Ministries has since replaced the three longer-form radio broadcasts with shows having different titles and reworked formats.) In May 1996, Southwest Baptist University conferred on Burkett an honorary doctorate in economics. His last book was Nothing to Fear, in which he gave an update on his experiences with cancer and cancer treatments.

Not long before his death, Burkett founded the Larry Burkett Cancer Research Foundation.

Larry's final book before his death was The Burkett & Blue Definitive Guide to Securing Wealth to Last, and was written with Ron Blue and Jeremy L. White.

== The Coming Economic Earthquake ==
In "The Coming Economic Earthquake" (Moody Press, Chicago, IL, 1991), Burkett delineated growing federal deficits and the ever increasing use of debt by business and households out of control. Burkett predicted that those severe economic times would appear sometime shortly after the year 2000 unless then-current policies were changed. Burkett believed that Keynesian economic policies, with ideals for continuing federal deficits and the implicit preference for higher levels of consumption, reduced saving, and a larger role for government in the economy, are a means to disaster.

Burkett wrote that as interest on the debt consumes a larger and larger portion of the yearly federal budget, and more money is borrowed each year to pay the interest on what was borrowed in previous years, there will be a temptation to "monetize" the debt at an increasing rate; this would lead to a calamity not seen since the Great Depression. Burkett questioned whether or not elected leaders would take action in time to prevent fiscal chaos and believed they would not.

== Publications ==
=== Non-fiction ===
- What Ever Happened to the American Dream
- The Coming Economic Earthquake
- Your Finances in Changing Times
- Business by the Book
- The Financial Planning Workbook
- Women Leaving the Workplace
- Investing for the Future
- Financial Parenting
- Debt-Free Living
- Hope When It Hurts
- and Great Is Thy Faithfulness
- Nothing to Fear
- The Complete Financial Guide for Young Couples
- Crisis Control in the New Millennium
- The Burkett & Blue Definitive Guide to Securing Wealth to Last (with Ron Blue and Jeremy L. White)
- Answers to Your Family's Financial Questions (ISBN 978-0-929608-08-2, 1987)
- What Husbands Wish Their Wives Knew About Money (Victor Books 1977)
- Money Matters:Answers to your financial questions.

=== Novels ===
- The ilimünati
- The THOR Conspiracy
- Solar Flare
- Kingdom Come (with T. Davis Bunn)
