= Hot 107-9 =

Hot 107-9 may refer to:

- WHTA-FM, near Atlanta, Georgia
- WWHT, Syracuse, New York
- WJFX, Fort Wayne, Indiana
- KHXT, Lafayette, Louisiana
- WPHI, Pennsauken, New Jersey
- WPFM, Panama City, Florida
