= WFRF (AM) =

Radio station in Tallahassee, Florida

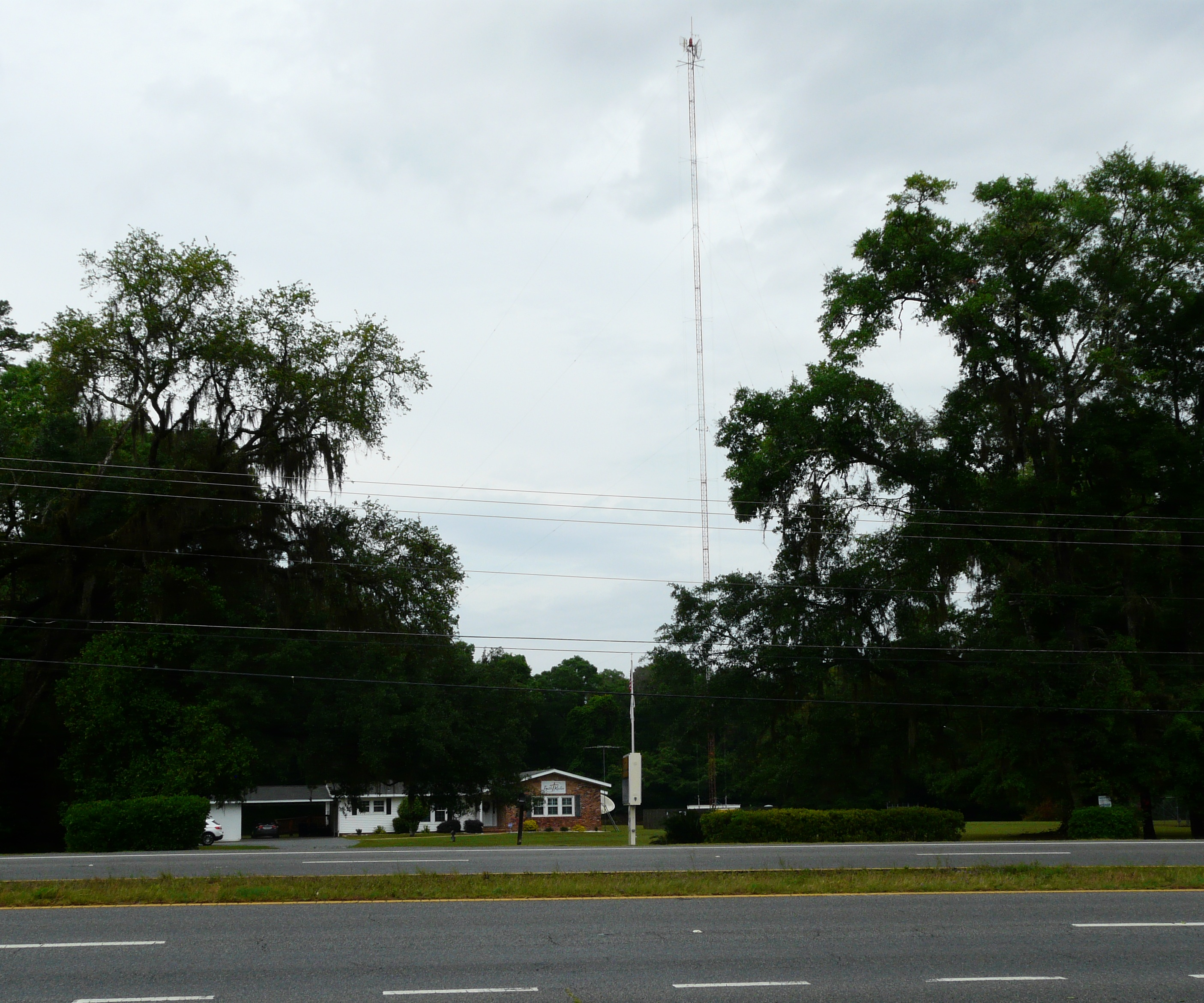
- WFRF studio and transmitter
- Tallahassee, Florida; United States
- Frequency: 1070 kHz
- Branding: Radio Fe

Programming
- Language: Spanish
- Format: Christian radio

Ownership
- Owner: Faith Radio Network, Inc.
- Sister stations: WFRF-FM

History
- First air date: August 24, 1974
- Former call signs: WANM (1974–1997)
- Call sign meaning: Faith Radio of Florida

Technical information
- Licensing authority: FCC
- Facility ID: 70860
- Class: D
- Power: 10,000 watts (day only)
- Transmitter coordinates: 30°30′34″N 84°20′7″W
- Translators: 92.3 W222AW (Bloxham); 106.7 W294CX (Tallahassee)
- Repeaters: 1430 WLTG (Upper Grand Lagoon); 101.7 W269DR (Panama City)

Links
- Public license information: Public file; LMS
- Webcast: Listen live
- Website: www.faithradio.us

WFRF (1070 AM, "Radio Fe") is an American radio station licensed to serve Tallahassee, Florida, United States. The station, established as WANM in 1974, is currently owned and operated by Faith Radio Network, Inc. WFRF is licensed as a "daytimer", authorized to broadcast only from sunrise to sunset, to protect the signal of clear-channel station KNX in Los Angeles and adjacent WAPI in Birmingham.

== Programming ==
WFRF broadcasts a Spanish-language Christian format to the Tallahassee metropolitan area. WFRF AM programming now consists of Christian music and teaching in Spanish. WFRF first began broadcasting as a religious station on October 6, 1997.

When it broadcast in English, notable national programs on WFRF AM once included Adventures in Odyssey, Back to the Bible, Bible Reading with Max McLean, Focus on the Family, Insight for Living with Chuck Swindoll, Joni and Friends with Joni Eareckson Tada, Let My People Think hosted by Ravi Zacharias, Love Worth Finding, plus My Money Life with Chuck Bentley.

== History ==
This station was founded as WANM by B.F.J. Timm as a 10,000-watt AM daytimer broadcasting on a frequency of 1070 kilohertz. Beginning regular broadcast operations on August 24, 1974, the station aired an urban radio format for the African-American community in Tallahassee. The call sign reflected the fact that Tallahassee is home to Florida A&M University. The station's broadcast license was held by WANM, Inc.

Timm died on September 17, 1993, at the age of 70 and control of the station was passed to Bruce B. Timm and Jan B. Timm as the "co-personal representatives" of the estate of B.F.J. Timm. The Federal Communications Commission (FCC) approved the transfer of control on November 16, 1993, and the transaction was formally consummated on December 23, 1993. Three years later, on December 20, 1996, they transferred control of WANM, Inc., to Beth L. Timm. During this period the station switched to a satellite-fed all-news radio format featuring CNN Radio.

In August 1997, WANM, Inc., reached a deal with Faith Radio Network, Inc., to acquire the assets of WANM's AM station. The FCC approved the sale on September 14, 1997, and the transaction was formally consummated on September 30, 1997. On October 6, 1997, the station changed its call sign to WFRF and began broadcasting a religious radio format branded as "Faith Radio". Over the years, Faith Radio expanded, buying FM stations in 2004 (WFRF-FM) and 2012 (WFRU). As a result, the ministry considered selling the AM frequency, but it instead opted to convert it to a Spanish-language service, beginning June 13, 2016.

== Outreach ==
Working with International Christian Ministries, Faith Radio raised money for a mission trip for its founders and more than a dozen WFRF listeners to help establish a Christian radio station in Kenya. Imani Radio (88.8 FM) launched in May 2005 as one of just four Christian radio stations in Kenya. ("Imani" means "faith" in the Swahili language.) WFRF also raised funds to provide 2,500 solar-powered radios pre-tuned to Imani Radio for use in Kenyan villages, hospitals, and prisons.

This last effort inspired to a new drive to provide solar-powered radios to prisoners in Florida's Big Bend region. Starting with a single prison and 250 radios which prisoners could check out, as they would a book from a library, by 2009 the program had grown to more than 1200 radios in 8 prisons across the region. These radios are tuned to receive only WFRF programming.
