= LWF =

LWF may refer to

- Lutheran World Federation, an organization of Lutheran denominations
- Lightweight Fighter program, a project of the United States Air Force
- Love Worth Finding, a radio and television ministry
- Lightweight fighter, a class of planes
