= WRBA =

Radio station in Springfield–Panama City, Florida

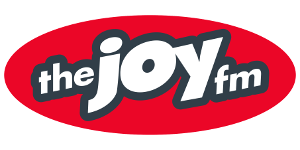
- Springfield, Florida; United States
- Broadcast area: Panama City, Florida
- Frequency: 95.9 MHz (HD Radio)
- Branding: The Joy FM

Programming
- Format: Christian AC
- Subchannels: HD2: Christian worship HD3: Christian hip hop

Ownership
- Owner: Radio Training Network

History
- First air date: 1986; 40 years ago (as WVBM)
- Former call signs: WVBM (1986–1987)
- Call sign meaning: We aRe BAy 96 (former branding)

Technical information
- Licensing authority: FCC
- Facility ID: 63584
- Class: C2
- ERP: 50,000 watts
- HAAT: 86 meters (282 ft)
- Transmitter coordinates: 30°12′12.00″N 85°36′57.00″W

Links
- Public license information: Public file; LMS
- Webcast: Listen Live
- Website: florida.thejoyfm.com

WRBA (95.9 FM, "The Joy FM") is a radio station licensed to Springfield, Florida. Owned by Radio Training Network, it broadcasts a Christian AC format serving the Panama City market.

== History ==
The station began broadcast in 1986 as WVBM, which was the area's first and only African-American-owned radio station.

At noon on November 14, 1987, after the call sign was changed to WRBA, the station's format shifted to easy listening and oldies under the name "Bay 96 FM". In a News-Herald interview, then-owner Peter Michael Bardach described its format as being "halfway between WGNE (AM) and Sunny 98 (FM)" and that it was targeted toward adults between 25 and 54. Over time, the format changed to a mix of modern rock and adult contemporary.

In October 1994, WRBA did away with the adult contemporary, and "Arrow 95.9" debuted. The "Arrow" originally stood for "All Rock & Roll Oldies", and to begin with, solely played rock from the seventies. Over its 18-year history, Arrow 95.9 kept its classic rock format, but expanded it to other decades (namely the 1960s through 1990s).

In 2012, the station was renamed "Classic Rock 95.9", but kept the same format.

In the aftermath of Hurricane Michael, Powell Broadcasting announced that it would cease operation of its Panama City stations, leaving the future of its licenses in the market in limbo.

On February 18, 2019, the station returned to the air under the operation of Gulf Coast Broadcasting. For around two weeks, the station simulcast WCCN-FM, but soon had its own original identity starting in mid-March. Gulf Coast Broadcasting completed the acquisition of WRBA, along with sister stations WASJ and WKNK, effective April 30, 2019 at a price of $325,000.

On July 3, 2019, Gulf Coast Broadcasting sold WRBA, WASJ, and WKNK to Great American Media for $700,000. The sale closed on September 26, 2019.

In June 2020, the station rebranded as B95.9, maintaining its classic rock format (despite using the branding "Classic Hits"), but dropping most music from the 1990s to focus exclusively on the 1970s and 1980s.

Effective July 1, 2022, Great American Media sold WRBA, WASJ, and WKNK to Roberta Fagan's RoRo Investments for $180,000.

On August 9, 2024, WRBA is being sold to Radio Training Network for $225,000 from RoRo Investments.
