= Austin Pryor =

American financial writer

Austin C. Pryor Jr
- Born: April 3, 1945 (age 81); Louisville, Kentucky, United States
- Education: University of Kentucky
- Occupation: Financial journalist
- Spouse: Susie Pryer
- Children: 3

Austin C. Pryor Jr. (born April 3, 1945) is an American financial writer, speaker, and radio personality whose work focuses on investment counseling from an evangelical Christian point of view.

== Early life ==
Pryor is a native of Louisville, Kentucky, and graduated from the University of Kentucky, where he received a B.S. degree in banking and finance in 1967.

== Career ==
Pryor founded his own investment management firm, Forum Investment Counselors, in 1978 where he saw his average client account more than triple in value during its first five years of operations. For the 1978–1982 period, his clients' average annual return was 25.5%, placing his firm in the top 5% of the A.G. Becker rankings of investment managers.

In 1990, Pryor launched Sound Mind Investing, a monthly financial newsletter targeted to "today's Christian family". In 1992, Pryor authored The Sound Mind Investing Handbook. In 2000, Sound Mind Investing launched a paid subscription website. In 2005, Pryor and the other members of SMI's management team partnered with another firm to form SMI Advisory Services, an independent entity, in order to launch The Sound Mind Investing Fund (SMIFX). In January 2011, a second fund was launched, the SMI Balanced Fund (SMILX). Today, Sound Mind Investing is America's best-selling Christian financial newsletter, reaching over 14,000 readers.

Over the 13-year period, Sound Mind Investing outperformed the market (as measured by the Dow Jones Wilshire 5000) by nearly two-to-one. The Sound Mind Investing Funds, mutual funds based on the newsletter's successful investing technique, manage over $300 million.

Pryor's book The Sound Mind Investing Handbook: A Step-By-Step Guide to Managing Your Money from a Biblical Perspective was a finalist for the ECPA Christian Book Award in Christian publishing, and enjoys the endorsements of numerous respected Christian teachers. With over 100,000 in circulation, the book is now in its sixth edition.

Pryor's written articles have appeared in the publications of such Christian organizations as Focus on the Family and the Christian Business Men's Committee. His work currently appears on Crosswalk.com, Christian Broadcasting Network, and Crown Financial Ministries' websites.

Pryor has been a frequent guest on Crown Financial Ministries' Money Matters program from 1990 to 2005. Mark Biller, Sound Mind Investing's Executive Editor, is now a regular guest on Howard Dayton's MoneyWise radio program.

Pryor has been the featured speaker at various mayor and governor prayer breakfasts, including for former Arkansas governor Bill Clinton in 1983. He has also spoken at various functions of the Christian Business Men's Committee, Christian Women's Clubs, and The 700 Club. He was a founding member of the Board of Directors of Pro Athletes Outreach, a Christian training ministry to professional athletes of all sports, and the Christian Embassy, an outreach ministry to government and diplomatic officials and their families in Washington, D.C.

== Personal life ==
Pryor has been married to his wife, Susie, for 48 years; they have three grown children: Tre, Andrew, and Matthew; and they have 10 grandchildren. Pryor and his wife reside in Louisville, Kentucky. He has been a member of Southeast Christian Church since 1990.

== Publications ==
- The Sound Mind Investing Handbook: A Step-By-Step Guide to Managing Your Money from a Biblical Perspective ISBN 0-615-22624-8
