= Conker's Bad Fur Day =

2001 video game

- North American box art
- Developer: Rare
- Publishers: NA: Rare; EU: THQ
- Director: Chris Seavor
- Designer: Chris Seavor
- Artist: Don Murphy
- Writers: Robin Beanland; Chris Seavor
- Composer: Robin Beanland
- Series: Conker
- Platform: Nintendo 64
- Release: NA: 5 March 2001; EU: 6 April 2001
- Genres: Platform, action-adventure
- Modes: Single-player, multiplayer

Conker's Bad Fur Day is a 2001 platform game developed by Rare for the Nintendo 64. It is the second installment in the Conker series, after Conker's Pocket Tales (1999). The game follows Conker, a greedy, hard-drinking red squirrel who must return home to his girlfriend, Berri, after an evening of heavily drinking at the local pub. Most of the game requires the player to complete a linear sequence of challenges that involve jumping over obstacles, solving puzzles, and fighting enemies. In the multiplayer mode, up to four players can compete against each other in seven different game types.

Although visually similar to Rare's previous games, such as Banjo-Kazooie (1998), Donkey Kong 64 (1999), and Banjo-Tooie (2000), Conker's Bad Fur Day was designed for mature audiences and features graphic violence, alcohol and tobacco use, profanity, dark humour, toilet humour, fourth wall breaks, and pop culture references. Development lasted four years, with concepts originating during the development of Killer Instinct Gold in 1996. The game, intended for a family audience, was initially titled Twelve Tales: Conker 64 and was set for release in late 1998, but by the time it received criticism for its child-friendly tone and resemblance to Banjo-Kazooie during E3 1998, the game was transformed into an adult-oriented version.

Conker's Bad Fur Day was released in North America on 5 March 2001, and in Europe on 6 April 2001, following an advertising campaign that targeted male college students. It received critical acclaim, with praise directed at its humor, sound, visuals, and gameplay. However, the game sold well below expectations due to limited advertising and a release towards the end of the Nintendo 64's life cycle, but has since developed a cult following. A remake, Conker: Live & Reloaded, was released for the Xbox in 2005, while the original version was included as part of the Rare Replay compilation for Xbox One in 2015.

== Gameplay ==
The player can travel from one level to another through the game's overworld. Each area has a distinct colour theme.

Conker's Bad Fur Day is a platform game, its later sections featuring elements of shooters. The player controls Conker the Squirrel through a series of three-dimensional levels. The game features an overworld where players can transition from one level to another, although many are initially blocked off until Conker earns a certain amount of cash. Each level is an enclosed area in which the player can freely explore to find tasks to do. The gameplay mostly relies on figuring out a way to help other characters by completing a linear sequence of challenges. These challenges may include defeating a boss, solving puzzles, gathering objects, and racing opponents, among others. The result is always a cash reward, which aids access to other areas in the overworld.

As compared to the player characters in Rare's previous platform games Banjo-Kazooie and Donkey Kong 64, Conker's abilities are simpler. The player can run, jump, and smack enemies with a frying pan. Conker can also swim underwater for a limited period of time, climb ladders or ropes, and push objects. To regain lost health, Conker can eat pieces of "anti-gravity" chocolate that are scattered throughout the levels. The game employs "context-sensitive" pads that allow Conker to gain different, temporary abilities when pressing the "B" button atop them. For instance, in the beginning of the game, by pressing the B button on the first pad he encounters, Conker drinks some Alka-Seltzer to relieve his hangover, at which point players can proceed forward. Some pads can turn Conker into an anvil to slam into the ground, while others pull out his shotgun, blow torch, throwing knives, and slingshot. They also serve to inform players of what needs to be done next.

The game includes a multiplayer mode where up to four players can compete against each other in seven different game types: Beach, Raptor, Heist, War, Tank, Race and Deathmatch. In Beach, a team of players must go up through a beach and into a waiting escape vehicle, while another must stop them by firing at them from fixed positions. Raptor involves a team of players controlling raptors to feed a baby dinosaur while another controlling cavemen who have to steal dinosaur eggs. Heist engrosses players in the robbery of a bank, where the goal is to retrieve a cash bag from the centre of the level and run with it to the team's vault without being damaged. War can either be a traditional capture the flag mode or Total War, where players have to get the other team's gas canister and use it to release a chemical gas that annihilates the enemy. In Tank, players fight using tanks and chemical canisters that release a lethal gas. Race is a racing mode which provides two variations of the same course. Items can be acquired and used against opponents. Finally, Deathmatch is a standard deathmatch mode where players fight against each other in shooting style from a third-person perspective. Players can set multiple options for each game, such as score limit, number of lives, and inclusion of computer-controlled bots.

== Summary ==
=== Setting ===
Conker's Bad Fur Day is set in the Fairy Panther King's Kingdom. Windy is the game's main hub with entrances to most other sections: the farm Barn Boys, the poo-filled Sloprano, Heist, the horror-themed Spooky, Bats Tower, and It's War. Only one other section requires entering from an area besides Windy: Uga Buga, which must be entered under the bottom of Sloprano by paying the location's weasel guards $1,000. Obtaining access to the entrance requires going through a sewer pipe only accessible after defeating a large opera-singing mountainous pile of feces, named the "Great Mighty Poo". Windy has a beetle-populated area entirely filled with fecal matter, consisting of a big Poo Mountain and a Poo Cabin and a river next to it. Poo balls are required to enter the Sloprano section within the mountain, and Bats Tower which is only opened once the water in the river is drained. Poo balls are available at Poo Cabin, accessible after completing Barn Boys. The dung beetle near the entrance offers Conker poo balls if he can make the farm cows excrete in the pasture. Doing so involves Conker on the Poo Cabin's pasture turning on a big spigot to activate the prune juice (which gives the cows diarrhea), and using a bull to open gates for the cows to get out, as well as to kill the cows once each one finishes defecating. $2,110 is needed to pay Mr. Barrel to propel down a slope and break a barrier to the entrance of Spooky.

=== Plot ===
The morning after a night of binge drinking with his friends before they are drafted for a war, a drunken Conker loses his way while attempting to get home, and awakens to find himself lost in an unfamiliar land with a terrible hangover. Meanwhile, the Panther King, ruler of the land that Conker is lost in, finds that his throne's side table is missing one of its legs and orders his servant, Professor Von Kriplespac, to solve the problem. When Von Kriplespac suggests the use of a red squirrel as the fourth leg of his table, the Panther King sends his minions to capture one. During his quest to return home to his girlfriend Berri, Conker finds wads of cash scattered throughout the land and becomes sidetracked from his goal in pursuit of monetary rewards. This leads him to embroil himself in a series of increasingly absurd and often dangerous situations, including having to recover a beehive from enormous wasps; confronting a giant opera-singing pile of feces called The Great Mighty Poo; being tasked by Don Weaso, the head of the Weasel Mafia, to bomb an entire village of cavemen; being transformed into a bat by his vampiric ancestor Count Batula in order to feed him the blood of a villager mob; and getting drafted into the aforementioned war between grey squirrels and a Nazi-like group of teddy bears known as the Tediz, which Conker ultimately destroys.

When Conker finds Berri, Don Weaso returns to enlist their help in robbing the Feral Reserve Bank. After entering the vault, Conker and Berri find that the bank scene was an elaborate trap set by the Panther King to capture Conker. In the confrontation, Berri is shot by Weaso on the Panther King's orders, and she dies in Conker's arms. The Panther King suddenly begins having chest pains and calls for Von Kriplespac. The Professor stands aside and watches gleefully as a Xenomorph-like creature bursts out of the Panther King's chest, killing him. Von Kriplespac explains that the creature, whom he names "Heinrich", is one of his creations, and that he had planned to use this opportunity to kill the Panther King and escape his captivity. He then reveals that they are inside a spaceship, which he activates and takes into low orbit. From there, he instructs Heinrich to attack and kill Conker as revenge for destroying the Tediz, which were also his creations. Conker opens an airlock, expelling Kriplespac as well as the Panther King and Berri's corpses into space, and then battles Heinrich with the aid of a robotic suit.

Despite being cast into outer space after the fight, Heinrich manages to crawl back aboard the spaceship. Conker loses hope but, as he is about to be mauled by Heinrich, the game suddenly freezes. Conker expresses disbelief that Rare did not test the game properly before releasing it. Upon managing to communicate with the programmers through the command-line interface, Conker promises the programmers not to tell anyone about the terrible lockup left in the game, provided they assist him in dealing with Heinrich. Among many weapons at disposal courtesy of the programmers, Conker chooses a katana and requests to be taken to the Panther King's throne room, where he decapitates Heinrich. With the Panther King's servants now released from his oppressive control, Conker is then crowned the new king of the land. Conker, who does not want to go through with this, realises that he should have asked the programmers to bring Berri back while he was negotiating with them. He calls out to them, only to realise that the programmers have already left. Now sat on his throne, an embittered Conker gives a closing monologue, in which he discusses appreciating what one already has instead of always wanting more, stating that "the grass is always greener, and you don't know what it is you have until it's gone".

After the credits roll, Conker is seen back at the same pub he was drinking in at the start of the game, now barren of all his friends due to their deaths in the war against the Tediz. As it begins to storm outside, he drunkenly exits the bar, leaving in the opposite direction he took previously, presumably back home.

== Development ==
=== Early concepts ===
Following the success of Nintendo's Super Mario 64 (1996), a "barn" at Rare began conceiving and designing a similar unnamed "generic 3D platform adventure" during development of Killer Instinct Gold (1996). Tim Stamper had planned the game to star a cute squirrel mascot named Conker from the get-go, in order to have the widest possible appeal. The staff of Project Dream saw the yet-to-be-named platform game during the creation of its engine, and was inspired to change Dream from an RPG to a platforming game in the visual and gameplay style of the Killer Instinct team's project. Both then-upcoming Rare titles were first announced at the Electronic Entertainment Expo in June 1997, receiving the names Banjo-Kazooie and Conker's Quest, the first two games presented by Nintendo at the event.

N64.com reported Conker's Quest being a Super Mario 64-like game that "make[s] gamers feel as if they're playing through Disney's movie version of Bambi", where "Conker collects nuts and battles against giants in huge landscapes and is joined by a female squirrel who assists him as he makes his way through the game". The source reported the cameras being in an unfinished state and journalists unable to differentiate between it and Banjo-Kazooie, although liking Banjo far more. A writer for Ultra Game Players also noted it looking similar to Banjo and summarised that "Conker has to collect nuts, find new power-ups (in the form of different hats - kind of like Wario Land) and generally negotiate colorful 3D landscapes". He called its gameplay "competent and even addictive" and praised the visuals for "upping the ante on [Rare's] previous efforts, where the clipping is better, the textures more varied and the overall look of the game is expansive and colorful". However, he suggested its "disturbing" cuteness, while gaining Nintendo an audience of younger players, would turn off older players and criticised the gameplay of Conker and Banjo for being not original enough from Mario 64.

At the 1998 Expo, it was revealed that the game's title was changed to Twelve Tales: Conker 64 and the release was set for fall 1998. 64 magazine suspected the name change was to prevent consumers from confusing it with another Nintendo 64 title, Quest 64 (1998). Twelve Tales would have had a single-player mode and two-multiplayer modes. In single-player, the player could play as either Conker or Berri, where Conker's segments would be "arcade-style platformer[s]" involving "action and speed" and Berri's would be puzzle stages depicting her controlling her dino companion (as well as feeding him) so that he can protect her from enemies. The two multi-player modes would have been a co-operative two-player mode where the players play as Conker and an owl, and a split-screen four-player battle mode where players attack each other with acorns. Conker, unlike Bad Fur Day, moved on four legs in Twelve Tales.

Coverage upon the game's 1998 E3 appearance was generally positive, with focal points including the graphics, characters, content, and the characters changing emotions in reaction to the environment. Total 64 found the visuals better than Nintendo's Zelda game presented at the Expo, "utilising the N64's hi-res mode and displaying some gorgeous textures"; it additionally praised its "highly imaginative" four-player mode and Berri's levels. Journalist Andy McDermott appreciated the huge amount of content, in particular the multi-player modes, the two different gameplay styles in the single-player mode and the fact that Conker learns new moves and attacks as the game progresses. Coverage was not without criticisms, however; McDermott disliked its "Americanized" writing that consisted of "colonial-style comments" and the "infuriatingly happy music", while Next Generation called its premise of a squirrel collecting acorns in "stunningly unimaginative forests" a rip-off of Ocean Software's 16-bit platform game Mr. Nutz (1993). The most frequent skepticism was its kid-friendliness, particularly its consumer interest after the release of other family-friendly platformers like Banjo-Kazooie (1998). All of this concerned Rare, a developer which had a history of making games like Conker, resulting in a game design overhaul.

=== Transition to an adult game ===
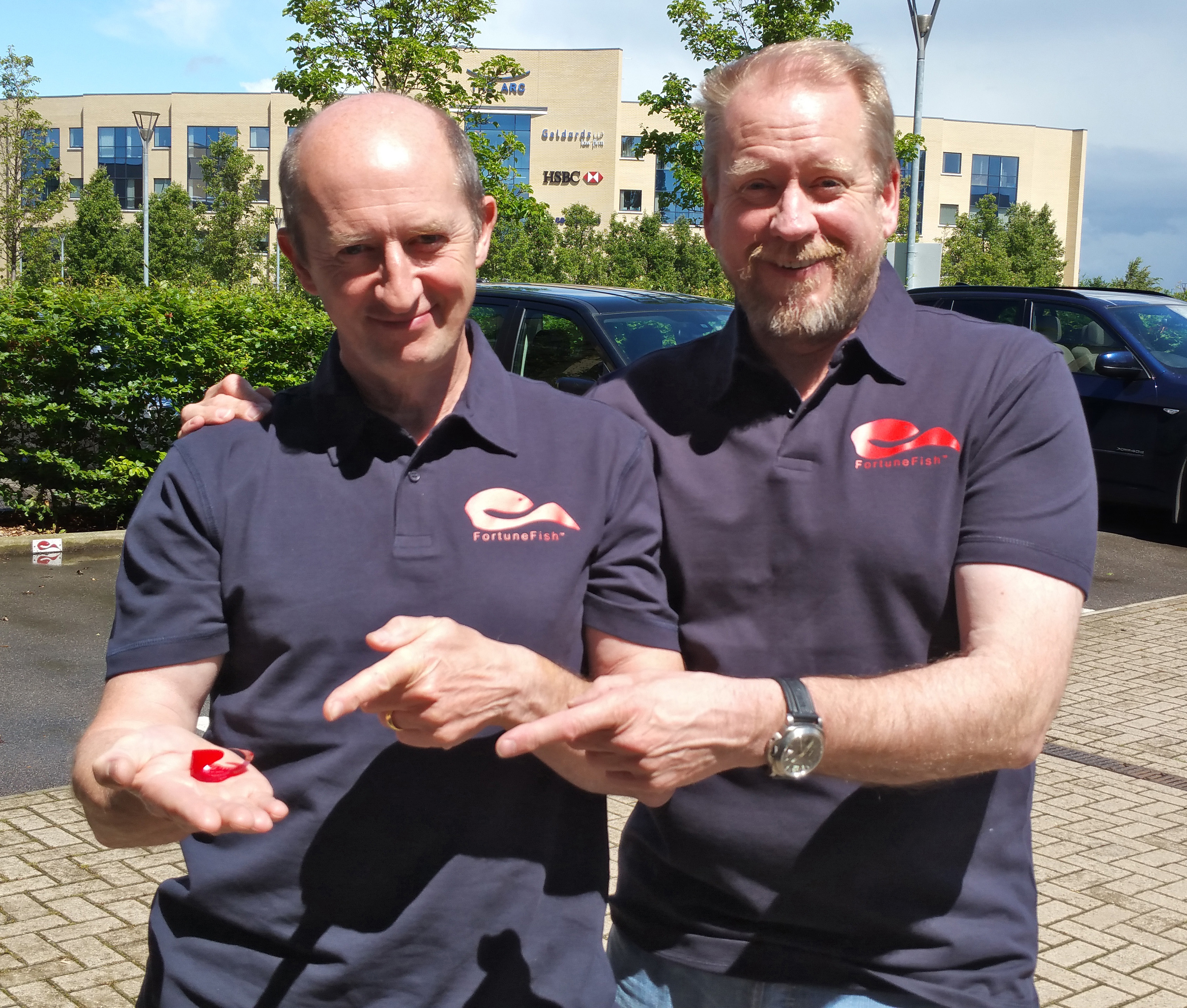
Both Chris and Tim Stamper (pictured in 2015) were suggested the idea of changing the name of the game.

Conker was planned to only take two years to make, but fights between workers at the barn delayed the process. Artist Don Murphy was unsatisfied with the developing game, and software engineer Chris Marlow said that "there was an awful lot of content and there were lots of fun ideas, but it just really wasn't gelling as a finished game". Additionally, the market for Mario 64-style platformers was saturated, and another game of that caliber developed by Rare, Banjo-Kazooie, was already completed and released to critical and commercial success. For the team, either something changed or the team had to split into other barns working on new projects, after having cancelled Conker. Multiple delays and a lack of updates led the press to believe that Twelve Tales was quietly cancelled.

Chris Seavor, who began working on the project as an artist, then pitched to Rare leaders Tim and Chris Stamper an idea he had since during the Twelve Tales phase, a day in the life game named Bad Fur Day about Conker trying to help others but causing more problems in doing so. In addition to having a narrative to give the titular character a personality, Seavor wanted to make the game "edgy, in terms of its violence"; the Stampers loved the idea and moved Seavor up to project lead. Seavor's first action following the meeting was changing the task "Wasps and the Queen Bee". Tim Stamper conceived its premise of wasps stealing a beehive, but Seavor noticed no established reasons or punchline behind it. He decided to end it with the beehive having guns shooting at the wasps; the founders loved it and directed the team to "make more of that". This set the formula for later missions: an introduction, interaction of the mission, and then an "extreme punchline" cutscene as reward for completing the task. It also changed the style of a game to a platformer starring a cute mascot character in an incredibly raunchy world. According to the developers: "We already had the main character (although he was eventually remodeled) and a good deal of code already written, so the best option seemed to be to change the game's direction. Mature humour was a key element".

Rare clarified publicly in January 2000 that the game was "still being worked on by a full team and with the same level of dedication as when it was first announced".

In 2000, Twelve Tales: Conker 64 was retooled into Conker's Bad Fur Day with a large amount of scatological humour.

=== Workflow ===
All of Conker's Bad Fur Day's staff, including the animators, programmers, and writers, worked in a liberated, non-planned, and intuition-based manner; the cutscene dialogue and gameplay design in particular was spontaneously conceived between the developers with a rough notion of the level's story. Out of all the game's dialogue, only the intro was scripted. The developers' ideas were tracked with notepads, as they would describe them verbally while taking notes of what they heard from others. Shawn Pile wrote a language that allowed for changes in the game's structures to be done in a few seconds, whereas without it, it would have taken "two-and-a-half to three minutes" to make a change.

=== Writing and cultural references ===
The beginning, middle and end of the story was done all at the same time, with events written to happen later in the story leading to the inclusion of elements earlier. In order to fit three save files in four kilobytes of SRAM space, the game was broken up into lengthy chapters. Seavor's focus on the game, as project lead, was making sure the narrative complemented the gameplay and mechanics: "Just doing a 'thing' like hitting something with a brick is far more engaging if there's a motivation behind it to disguise the binary nature of the act". For example, the developers originally planned Conker to attack with a baseball bat; this was changed to a frying pan because it justified the use of a comic sound effect of a metal object hitting something.

When designing levels, the developers were originally more focused on the gameplay than the comedy; as development went on, they noticed being less focused on gameplay and more on the comedic premises made the levels come together easier. This especially became evident with the use of film parodies, which Seavor decided on after adding a Terminator (1984) reference in the barnyard scene. The parodies helped the developers come up with ideas for music, sound, design, and gameplay. For example, the spoofing of The Matrix (1999) in a lobby chase scene gave composer and audio engineer Robin Beanland ideas for interactive music, where shooting bullets would fade the channels of the upbeat music into channels playing something more downtempo.

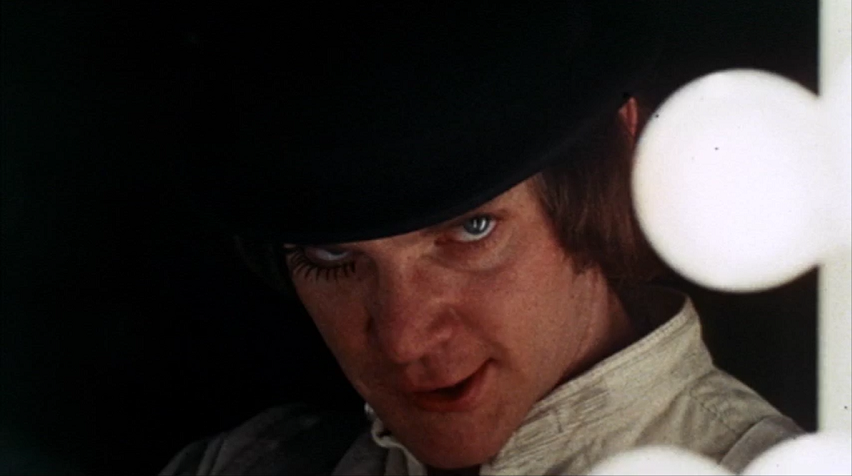

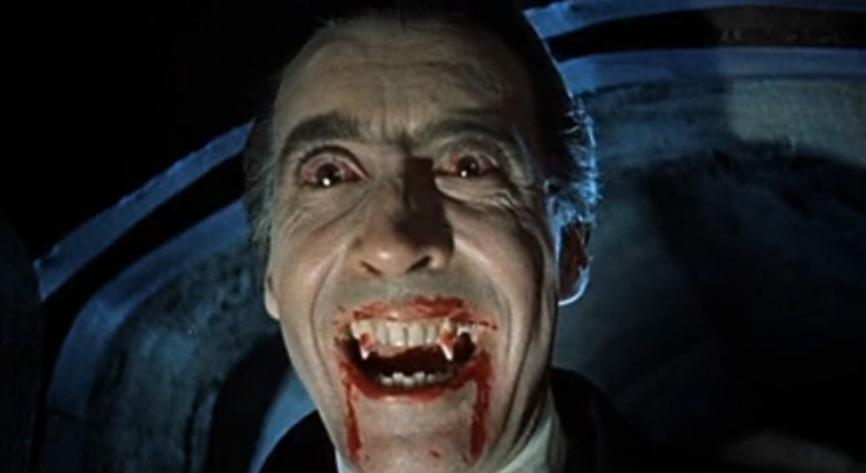
Multiple parts of the game satirize scenes from various films, including A Clockwork Orange (1971) (top) and Dracula (1958) (bottom).

The Star Wars series, Bram Stoker's Dracula (1992), and Apocalypse Now (1979) are among the films spoofed. Conker's Bad Fur Day begins with a shot-by-shot recreation of the intro of A Clockwork Orange (1971). A joke in one of Conker's conversations with the catfish references Trading Places (1983). The sequences involving the shark-bulldog Brute parodies Jaws (1975), particularly featuring music cues similar to that of the film. The final boss fight references Aliens (1986), as an alien rips out of the Panther King's chest and Conker fights it in a powersuit.

Conker's Bad Fur Day also satirises conventions of adventure and platform games, occasionally by breaking the fourth wall. Conker makes fun of how menial his missions are, and the villain's motivation of getting a table leg pokes at the shallow premises of other games. Burt, a metal box in the "Barn Boys" chapter that stands in place for most of the level, is only there to open a gate, which pokes fun at characters in other games only there to be communicated with for the player to achieve other tasks. The explanation for why floating chocolate bars exist makes fun of floating collect-able items in other games where why they float is not established. The death sequences, where Conker encounters a skeleton named Gregg, was an attempt to make logical the concept of multiple lives. The bosses also take four hits to kill, a twist on the typical three in other video games.

Certain story elements, although not spoofing material, took influence from the works of Monty Python. "The Milk Thing", a running gag where the Panther King has to be restrained from masturbating, was inspired by a joke just as "trivial and banal" in a skit on Monty Python's Flying Circus (1969–1974) titled "Blancmange Playing Tennis", while a cow was based on the feminine guard character in Monty Python and the Holy Grail (1975). The fart noise segment of "Uncle Fucka" from South Park: Bigger, Longer, and Uncut (1999) was the inspiration for a level theme (named "Poo")'s arrangement consisting of fart noises. Some characters were based on real-life people the developers encountered. Birdy the scarecrow was based on a bearded Rare developer, and Gregg the Grim Reaper was named after Gregg Mayles. The bee king was inspired by a "really scruffy" man Seavor encountered while walking on a street in Nottingham who screamed at him, "don't speak to me like that, in my country I am a king."

=== Programming ===
The developers heavily analysed Super Mario 64 in making Conker's Bad Fur Day, especially when it came to the camera. The staff noticed it, along with Prince of Persia 3D (1999), used "fixed views" that could not be controlled by the player. To make the game look cinematic, Rare went with having a fixed camera that was very zoomed out. To increase the number of simultaneous light sources to four, one programmer spent four months deciphering and rewriting the Nintendo-supplied Japanese-commented microcode for the Nintendo 64's Reality Coprocessor, while another microcoded the support for MP3, reverberation, and Dolby Pro Logic surround sound.

The length of all cutscenes combined total around two hours. Marlow programmed a "cutscene editor" that allowed for separately-made animations, audio files, visual effects, and camera setups to easily be compiled together for cutscenes. However, making cutscenes was still a lengthy process. The editor lacked a feature to preview only bits of cutscenes, meaning they had to be played in their entirety before they could be altered again; this made several small changes (such as text copyedits and adjustments to the timing of speech bubbles to match camera angle changes) very tedious.

The testing for Nintendo's Seal of Quality was strict; although the game was tested in the United States for five days with no bugs noticed, it was 24 hours in the Japan unit's three-day test that they noticed a problem of a cutscene in the first level not being triggered. Initially, Gregg's introductory scene (which is triggered the first time the player dies) was not to be "forced" in the "Spooky" level where the reaper appears again, as the programmers assumed no player would get to it without dying; a tester successfully did, so in the final game, the death scene plays once Conker reaches the stage.

=== Animation ===
Maya was used to create 3D animations. Beanland and animator Louise Ridgeway estimated 8.7 seconds and two-to-three cycles of animation were completed per day. When it came to animation, small details were a priority, such as the Fire Imps reacting if a swear word was entered into the cheat code menu and the camera shaking and triggering a sound effect if hit by an object. This method sometimes led to tedious tasks, such as having to animate each of several bricks on a bridge separately. Some animations, such as drunk character movements, required research. Animating Conker's juggling required Ridgeway being taught by David Rose how to juggle.

Conker has 2,000 animations, including 15 idle animations. Lots of work was spent on Conker's tail, animating it for several instances when he rotates, stands, twitches, and moves around; in an attempt to simplify this process, the tail was thought of as a "bag of air". For animating objects attached to parts of Conker's model, Marlow coded as if the objects were constrained to joints different from the parts coming in contact with the objects; Conker's juggling balls moved based on his right hip, the Game Boy was attached to his foot, and the frying pan was connected to his wrist.

For Conker's peeing attack, only the back of him was animated without his front completed; this was because if the front of Conker peeing was animated and seen, it would have given Conker's Bad Fur Day an AO ("Adults Only") rating from the Entertainment Software Rating Board. Conker's cheeks were originally animated to puff during his whistling animation, but it broke during testing, and by the time it was fixed it was too late to program it into the final product.

=== Audio ===
The inclusion of voice acting, in addition to the adult content, was another method by Seavor of differentiating Conker's Bad Fur Day in the Nintendo 64 marketplace; the idea initially garnered skepticism from a few staff members who argued it was "too much work", but Seavor explained that for Beanland, it "was like laying down a challenge, one we both accepted and relished". For making each mission scenario, voice recording came first; Beanland recalled one session lasting an hour. Seavor described the voice recording process and him and Beanland "having some fun with stupid voices". The vocal track meant Conker's Bad Fur Day required a 64 MB cartridge, one of the few Nintendo 64 games that size. Audio alone occupied roughly 40–48 MB of all cartridge space.

Except for The Great Mighty Poo, all of the male characters, including Conker, and two female characters were voiced by Seavor, with all other female characters voiced by the animator Louise Ridgeway. Routines of The Jerky Boys influence the voice direction, such as the New York accent on the Nasty Wasps. For Berri, Ridgeway was directed to use an American accent. She recalled in 2015 that she'd "never been anywhere in my life; I'd just flown over from Dublin", so "all I could think was to add 'like' so often". Seavor and Beanland had difficulty coming up with voices for the Ugas; they initially tried to make them sound like the cavemen in At the Earth's Core (1976), but were unsuccessful and ultimately decided to do random grunts and fast word sayings.

For music tracks where the instruments playing change depending on location, volumes of different MIDI channels were programmed to go up or down; one MIDI file was limited to 16 channels, so in order to have 32 MIDI channels for as much variation as possible, audio software engineer Mike Currington conceived having two MIDI files sync up with each other. With the intro to It's War replicating the chaotic audio of Saving Private Ryan, its bullet hit sounds were programmed as MIDI notes with much panning, taking advantage of the game's Surround Sound.

The Great Mighty Poo was performed by Marlow, who had experience in opera; recorded in a single afternoon, "Sloprano", the song the character sings, was written by Seavor and composer Robin Beanland specifically to incorporate Marlow's operatic talents. "Sloprano" was also originally going to have the sweetcorn be backing singers, with Ridgeway and another animator Aisling Duddy voicing them; this was rejected. The only Twelve Tales piece included in Conker's Bad Fur Day was the one where Conker is peeing on his enemies.

=== Rejected material ===
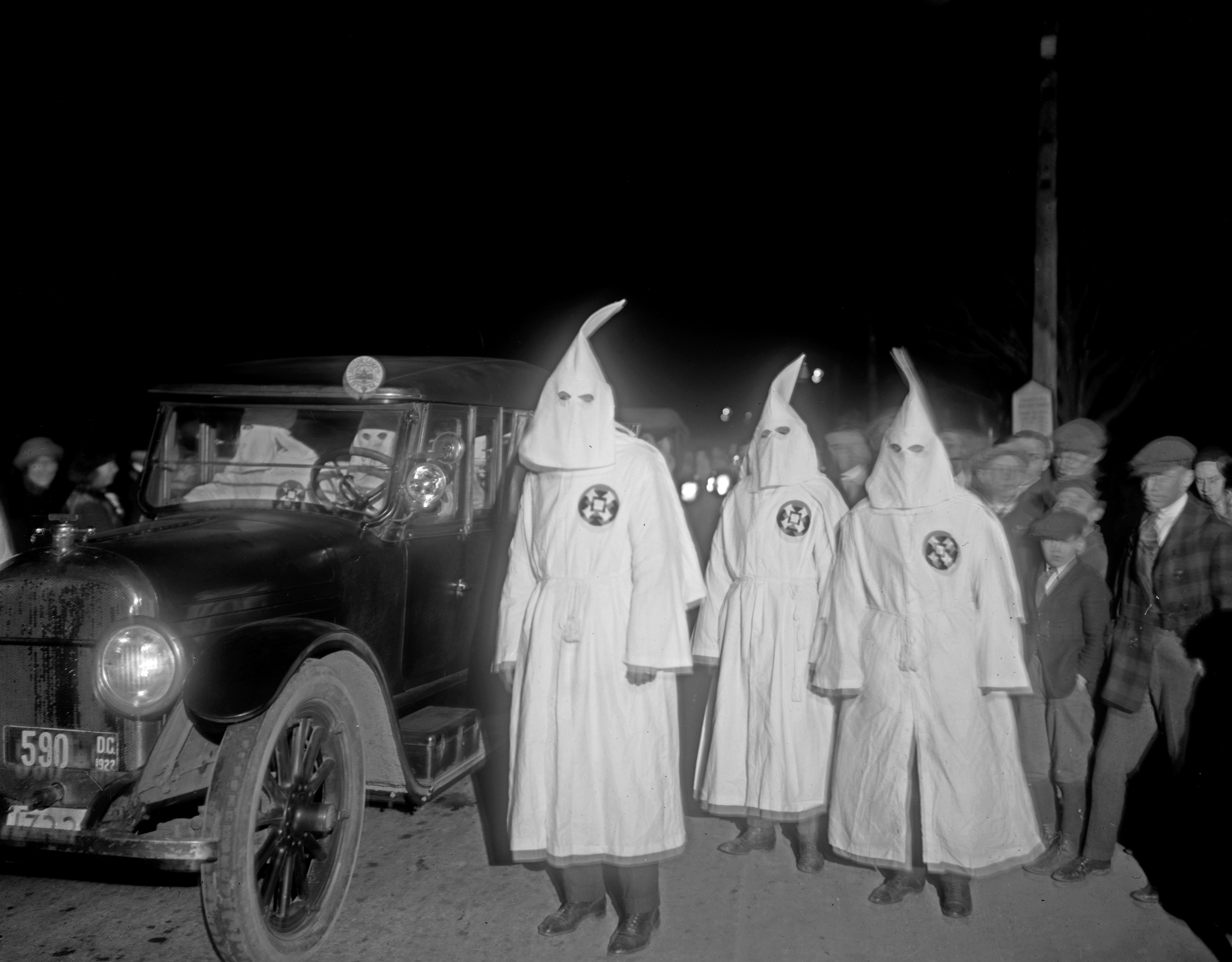
Material deemed offensive, such as a parody of the Ku Klux Klan, was removed.

Although Seavor remarked that "pretty much 99.9% of the game content remained" writing-wise, Conker's Bad Fur Day was around 20% longer than the final product when it came to planned gameplay designs and concepts, with material cut due to a lack of time to incorporate it. A few areas that made it into the game were initially modeled differently, such as the water tube in the shark-bulldog area Conker swims in chasing a wad of money. Some offensive content was cut by Nintendo, including cutscenes with characters dressed as the Ku Klux Klan and a joke at the expense of Pokémon. The introduction of Conker slashing the N64 logo in half was also initially disapproved by Nintendo; the developers in 2013 recalled that Rare founder Tim Stamper may have met with Nintendo to resolve the conflict. Scrapped characters included four in the cheese field of the barn (Camembert, Ninja Cheese, Cheese Crate, and King Dick Cheesy III) and six "Drugrats" (Roach, Cornsacks, Floury, Doughy, Pooey, and Mrs. Roach).

In the final game, a climbing area in the Poo Cabin includes a hole containing a piece of chocolate that's unattainable due to being protected by bars; this was meant to be the entrance of a section that was never finished, and Seavor deliberately left the hole to annoy players. The "Yeehaa!" section, which involve three cows and a bull Conker rides named Bugger Lugs, was going to be a bigger level; Conker would have flown in the sky by blowing up a female cow into fetish outfits and turning her into a balloon, dropping bricks on other cows that exploded into fecal matter. Another scrapped mission was a return to the shark-bulldog area with the re-appearance of Brute and Marvin the farting mouse, who exploded in a previous section; Conker would have killed the dogfish by feeding the mouse to Brute, then going to a context-sensitive area to shoot the fish as Marvin was about to explode, in reference to the shark's demise in Jaws.

A scrapped conclusion, named the "Lock-Up Ending", would have occurred when Conker beat the final boss and died at the same time. Everything would become static except for Conker, who would fall to the ground after briefly being frozen during a dive, and the programmers would be heard arguing about the bug; Conker would then make a deal with the programmers to remove the boss in exchange for not telling "Tony" about it. Animation for a set of outtakes in the closing credits a la the end credits of Toy Story 2 (1999) was started, but could not be completed in time. One of the bloopers was the "Mad Pitchfork" scene where Conker became annoyed and had his voice turn "primadonna". Another was for a scene not in the actual game, where the teddy bears had to play dead but were not in character when the sequence started, which, according to a developer, was to make fun of a tester. A rejected post-credits finale would have had Berri still alive, but as a slave to king Conker.

== Release ==
=== Target demographic ===
Conker's Bad Fur Day received an M (Mature) rating from the Entertainment Software Rating Board for reasons of "animated violence", "mature sexual themes", and "strong language", becoming the second Nintendo-distributed M-rated title after another Rare-developed game, Perfect Dark (2000). Nintendo's move into adult titles was to keep the interest of consumers who played the company's titles when they were younger; Nintendo of America spokeswoman Perrin Kaplan explained that the "kids who were 6 when they played the first Mario game are now 26". Less than a year before Conker's release, 18-year-olds and over made up 58% of console players, those in the 35+ age group 21%. This demographic change was due to the success of adult-oriented PlayStation franchises like Tomb Raider and Resident Evil, and it meant it would not be enough for Nintendo to compete with Sony entirely on children's properties.

Because Nintendo was known for its family-friendly games (in 2000, around three quarters of revenue were from sales of child-friendly video games), Conker's Bad Fur Day was the subject of controversy. According to Rare, "Nintendo initially had concerns regarding this issue, because kids might confuse the product as being aimed at them". The Los Angeles Times claimed "some parents used to Nintendo's family-friendly games are horrified", reporting a mother in Schererville, Indiana who bought the game for her 15-year-old son: "This is disgusting, sophomoric humor, and I'm disappointed in Nintendo. It's like Disney releasing pornography". Nintendo of America declined to acknowledge the game in its Nintendo Power magazine (although other official Nintendo publications outside the United States did cover the game), and copies of the magazine's strategy guides were packaged in black polybags with warnings similar to the one on the cover art imposed onto them. KB Toys, which specialised in toys and video games for children, also refused to sell the game.

=== Marketing campaign ===
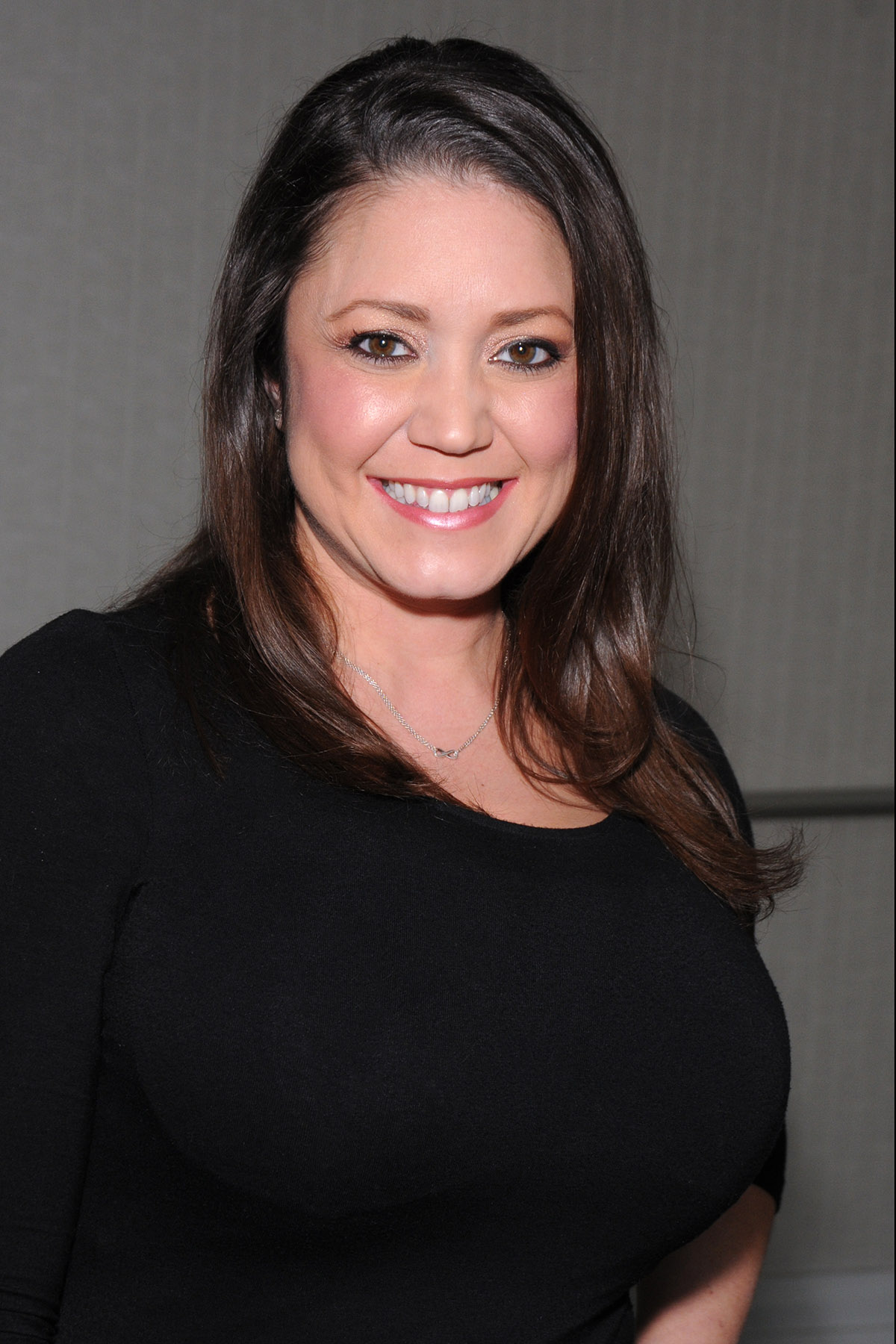
Playboy model Miriam Gonzalez in 2014. She hosted Conker's Bad Fur Day multi-player competitions in 20 American colleges as part of a tour by the magazine.

Starcom's promotional campaign for Conker's Bad Fur Day targeted college males and fratboys, advertising located in bars, colleges, late-night television, and adult magazines. For the Conker campaign, Starcom won two International Advertising Festival awards in the categories of use of mixed media and best campaign directed towards adult males; according to judges, it was also one of the top three contenders for Grand Prix, although Crispin Porter + Bogusky's Florida Anti-Tobacco Pilot Programme won it. The game's marketing budget was $5 million.

The campaign included a video ad named "Girl Talk" (on the website dubbed "69 Uncensored Seconds") that depicts a half-naked girl and a squirrel in bed with each other after a night of partying. For several months, urinal mats were placed in bathrooms of places in major cities, which included the URL for the game's website; Starcom associate media director Gina Broderick said: "Like Conker, our target's focus in on his social life. Being in bars is absolutely being in their element, and because urinating is part of game play, it made total sense".

From March to 5 April 2001, Playboy magazine ran its first ever video-game-related tour, a set of Conker's Bad Fur Day "Beach"-mode multiplayer competition parties at 20 colleges across the United States, hosted by Miss March 2001 Miriam Gonzalez. Winners of the contests were rewarded with green Nintendo 64 consoles, copies of Conker's Bad Fur Day, and Nintendo and Playboy merchandise, while the player with the highest score of all competitions won trips to two Playmate of the Year parties at Playboy Mansion. Spring break parties were also held at Club La Vela and South Padre Island's Louie's Backyard, the main events being "King of Tail" tattoo contests with free giveaways of various products on the side, such as Conker condoms, copies of Conker's Little Black Book (a collection of Conker's Bad Fur Day print ads), and t-shirts with "Got Tail?" on the front and the game's logo on the back.

Three "colouring book" advertisements were printed in magazines like Maxim. One consists of Conker and a woman next to a tree and around acorns on the ground, with the squirrel's head into her breasts; the tagline is, "Conker is a squirrel. Squirrels hunt for acorns. Can you help Conker find some acorns?" One depicted Conker peeing on flames with the tagline "Help Conker stop the bullies. Use your Yellow crayon" and another depicted him laying his head in a toilet with the text "Shhh! Conker is taking a nap".

=== Sales ===
Conker's Bad Fur Day was first released on 5 March 2001 in North America. It was the highest-selling mature-rated video game in its first month of release, and its website garnered 300,000 unique visitors in the first two weeks on the market. However, Conker's Bad Fur Day was not a commercial success, selling only about 55,000 copies within its first month of release. Potential reasons included its prohibitively high cost, advertisements exclusive to the older audience, and release near the end of the Nintendo 64's commercial life.

In Europe, Nintendo of Europe declined to publish or distribute the title following a full commercial appraisal, deeming Conker to not be "commercially viable" to localize due to its text-heavy nature. On 3 March 2001, Nintendo and Rare announced that THQ would publish and distribute the game in Europe, and the company released it on 6 April 2001.

As of February 2020, Conker's Bad Fur Day is the fourth rarest Nintendo 64 title, with copies selling on bidding sites for around $500 to $700 for a new copy; its value was affected by its unusual genre, poor initial sales, costly 64MB cartridges, being released near the end of the Nintendo 64's lifespan, and several leftover copies purchased upon Live & Reloaded's release.

== Reception ==
Reception

Aggregate scores
Aggregator	Score
GameRankings	89%
Metacritic	92/100

Review scores
Publication	Score
AllGame	4/5
Consoles +	90%
Edge	7/10
EP Daily	9.5/10
GamePro	20/20
GameRevolution	B+
GameSpot	9.3/10
Hyper	85/100
IGN	9.9/10
N64 Magazine	89%
Next Generation	3/5
Nintendo Life	9/10
Official Nintendo Magazine	93%
Gameplanet	4.5/5

Conker's Bad Fur Day received critical acclaim, with an aggregate review score of 92 out of 100 at Metacritic based on reviews from 19 critics. Claimed IGN editor Matt Casamassina in his 9.9/10 review, "not only is it quite possibly the most hilarious title ever created, but the selection of crude jokes, over-the-top violence and sexual content featured is only one-upped by the game's remarkably deep, well-paced level design, tightly knitted control mechanics, beautiful graphics and amazing sound quality."

Many publications and websites declared the graphics were the best on the Nintendo 64. Chris Slate of Next Generation wrote the title has the usual Rare qualities of "top-notch graphics" and "incredible worlds". Official Nintendo Magazine described even the gross-out levels as "drop dead gorgeous", and exclaimed the "amazing detail on the brilliant film spoof stages take our beloved N64 to new heights of visual pleasure". Critics noted that the game featured a number of technical effects that were uncommon at the time, especially for a Nintendo 64 game, such as "varied and crisp" textures, dynamic shadowing, coloured lighting, large areas with a long draw distance, no distance fog, detailed facial animations, lip syncing, and individually rendered fingers on some characters. GameSpot went so far as to say that the game "makes other Nintendo 64 games look like 16-bit software". Casamassina praised the detailed 3D worlds, "fantastic" texture work, and cute character designs. He remarked that "Conker himself is equipped with an in-game facial animation system that realistically portrays his different moods as he travels the lands. When he's scared, he looks it, and when he's pissed off players will actually be able to see his teeth showing in a frown". Reviewers noted occasional frame rate drops, but most agreed they did not interfere with the gameplay.

The game's audio and diverse vocal track were widely praised. Critics credited the voice acting for its different accents and styles, with "cleverly lewd" scripts and "dead-on" movie spoofs; Nintendojo noted certain voices sounding identical to film characters being spoofed. The soundtrack was praised for sounding clear for a cartridge title, its use of arrangement variation based on player location, and rich and creative instrumentation. Reviewers also highlighted the high number of sound effects, such as Conker's footsteps changing sound effects step-by-step, and how they benefitted the settings.

Most reviewers agreed the jokes were clever, funny, and well-delivered, and GamePro felt the "wildly diverse" weird missions were "sublime satirical genius" making up for the linear gameplay. However, some criticised the humor for being juvenile, misogynistic, and over-filled with profanity and bodily humor, and Slate felt the shock effect would go away within an hour. Seth Stevenson of Slate magazine called it an example of the lack of actual "mature" console games for "socially adjusted, non-outcasted adults who enjoy videogames". Official Nintendo Magazine described Conker's Bad Fur Day as "a monster sized game. Either you'll die laughing well before the end or it will take you months of dedicated gameplay to reach it".

The gameplay was highlighted for its unconventional context-sensitive pads. Casamassina noted that they "help keep the action shifting, refreshing, and always exciting", and credited Rare for reducing the number of items to collect. GameRevolution's Johnny Liu positively described the gameplay as "a staccato flow between gameplay and cutscenes"; while there's only one path to traverse the game's big world, the enjoyment came in thinking what to do next. Slate wrote its diverse set of "bizarrely creative scenarios" motivated gamers; he was, however, bothered by the game's lack of clear direction on where to go, which resulted in long-length wonders that only ended in stumbling upon the next required area, and felt that many puzzles lack logical coherence and depended too much on trial and error. Edge remarked that the pads make Conker's Bad Fur Day "little more than a procession of barely connected and puerile minigames".

Criticism was also targeted at the game's erratic camera system, simplistic action, short length and linear nature. N64 Magazine felt that the camera system does not allow players to properly judge their position within their surroundings and GameSpot remarked that it can get caught on objects or refuse to obey commands. The San Francisco Chronicle reported the camera being occasionally immovable and getting into frame objects that block the player's view, making worse an experience where the character is "difficult to control, especially when required to jump onto small areas".

The multiplayer modes garnered mixed responses. Casamassina and Gameplanet considered them inventive and praised the numerous options, adding longevity to the product. On the other hand, GameSpot stated that most modes "fail to stand the test of time", and Liu, although stating they were "a welcome bonus", considered them to be "filler", also criticizing that the responsiveness and control setup of the single-player mode were not suitable for the fast pace of the multi-player battles.

== Accolades ==
Conker's Bad Fur Day was awarded Nintendo 64 Game of the Month by IGN. It won best sound at the 2001 BAFTA Interactive Entertainment Awards, Best Platform Game at the GameSpot Best and Worst of 2001 awards (where it was also nominated in the Best Story and Best Nintendo 64 Game categories, losing to Final Fantasy X and Paper Mario respectively) and Best Anthropomorphic Game at the furry media award ceremony Ursa Major Awards. During the 5th Annual Interactive Achievement Awards, the Academy of Interactive Arts & Sciences nominated Conker's Bad Fur Day for the "Console Action/Adventure" and "Outstanding Achievement in Character or Story Development" awards, ultimately losing to Halo: Combat Evolved and Ico respectively.

In later years, Conker's Bad Fur Day has been called by professional gaming critics one of the best video games of all time, one of the greatest Nintendo games, and one of the best Nintendo 64 titles. In Uproxx's 2021 list of top 100 Nintendo 64 games based on 250,849 user ratings from various websites, Conker's Bad Fur Day came in at number 12. It ranked number six both on a list of Rare games by Shacknews (2018) and a ranking of best games featured on Rare Replay by Ginx. It was also called the first and seventh funniest game by GameTrailers (2009) and God is a Geek (2011) respectively. UGO included the game at #3 on their 2010 list of The 11 Weirdest Game Endings, and in 2013 Gaming Bolt named the water tube the 64th most challenging level of all video games. Despite its poor sales initially, the game has since enjoyed a cult following due to its unique styling.

== Legacy ==
After the release of Conker's Bad Fur Day, Rare began development of a direct sequel referred to as Conker's Other Bad Day. Seavor revealed that the game would deal with "Conker's somewhat unsuccessful tenure as King. He spends all the treasured money on beer, parties and hookers. Thrown into prison, Conker is faced with the prospect of execution and the game starts with his escape, ball and chain attached, from the Castle's highest tower". In 2002, however, Rare was purchased by Microsoft, who told them they were not interested in such a project.

A remake of Conker's Bad Fur Day, titled Conker: Live & Reloaded, was ultimately released for the Xbox in 2005 to generally favourable critical reception. Developers noted that it was difficult to port the game to the Xbox system because Bad Fur Day's microcoded performance optimisations had been deeply customised for the Nintendo 64 hardware. Conker: Live & Reloaded features updated graphics and a multiplayer mode that supports the Xbox Live service. Additionally, some aspects in the single-player mode were adjusted: several minor obscenities within the voice dialogue that are present in the Nintendo 64 game were censored at Microsoft's request, the camera control was refined and improved with a zoom function, and an auto-targeting system was added to the game.

After the release of Live & Reloaded, Rare began work on another game in the Conker universe titled Conker: Gettin' Medieval. The game was to be multiplayer-focused and did not feature Conker as a main character, with Rare instead hoping to focus on other characters in the series, but the game was ultimately cancelled. Conker returned in a new episodic campaign for the sandbox game Project Spark. The campaign, titled Conker's Big Reunion, is set ten years after the events of Bad Fur Day and Seavor reprised his voice roles. The first episode of the campaign was released in April 2015, but the remaining ones were cancelled the following September. Conker's Bad Fur Day is also included as part of the Rare Replay compilation for Xbox One, marking the original game's first official re-release. The compilation was released on 4 August 2015.
