= WANM =

- Tallahassee, Florida; United States
- Broadcast area: Tallahassee, Florida
- Frequency: 90.5 MHz

Programming
- Format: College Radio; Urban Contemporary

Ownership
- Owner: Florida A&M University

History
- Call sign meaning: Florida ANM University

Technical information
- Licensing authority: FCC
- Facility ID: 21755
- Class: A
- ERP: 1,600 watts
- HAAT: 51 metershttps://wanm.org/
- Transmitter coordinates: 30°25′49.00″N 84°17′27.00″W

Links
- Public license information: Public file; LMS
- Website: Official 90.5FM Website

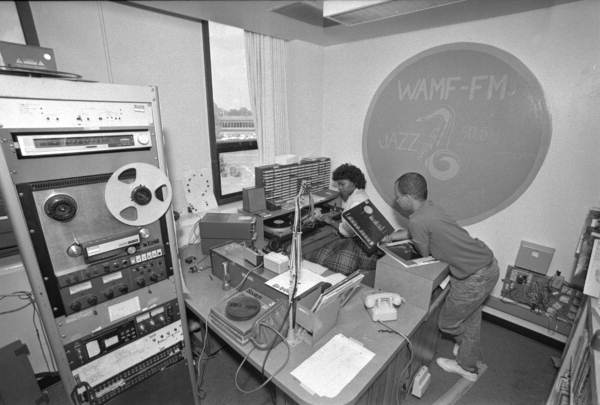
WAMF in 1987

WANM (90.5 FM) is an American radio station broadcasting a college radio (urban contemporary) format. Licensed to Tallahassee, Florida, the station serves the greater Tallahassee area. The radio station is owned by Florida A&M University and had the call sign WAMF until 1999. WANM was formerly an AM station on 1070 kHz. The frequency is currently used by WFRF (AM).

== See also ==
- Campus radio
- List of college radio stations in the United States
