= Project Spark =

- Developers: Team Dakota; SkyBox Labs
- Publisher: Microsoft Studios
- Director: Henry C. Sterchi
- Producer: Jesse Merriam
- Designer: Bradley Rebh
- Programmers: Jason Major; Søren Hannibal
- Artist: Bradley Shuber
- Composer: Laura Karpman
- Platforms: Microsoft Windows; Xbox One
- Release: NA: October 7, 2014; AU: October 9, 2014; EU: October 10, 2014
- Genres: Game creation system, sandbox
- Modes: Single-player; Multiplayer (Xbox One)

Project Spark is a game creation system developed by SkyBox Labs and Team Dakota and published by Microsoft Studios for Microsoft Windows and Xbox One. The game was announced during Microsoft's E3 2013 press event, and was launched as a Windows open beta in December 2013, and an Xbox One beta in March 2014. Project Spark is not available for purchase and online services are also not available as of August 12, 2016. Although no longer available for sale, players can continue to play offline so long as they have both a physical disc, and downloaded local copies of any custom-made creations.

== Gameplay ==
Project Spark is a digital canvas which can be used to make games, movies and other experiences. A player can download other user-generated content, remix that content or create content of their own. A player can use the Xbox controller, keyboard and mouse, touch devices and Kinect to build experiences. Kinect can be used to animate models and record audio. The created environments can contain mountains, rivers, and towns. The player can also create events, like inter-character battles. Created items and objects are able to be shared with other players.

Players choose whether to start from a blank map or a pre-designed level, but always have the tools to customize the topography, add plant and animal life, and program behaviors for specific objects, such as a rock that bounces when a player is nearby. The topography is modified by pushing and pulling the earth, digging through surfaces after changing the view to adjust a wall or create holes in it. Anything added to the terrain reacts to the circumstance, such as grass covering the floor and the vertical surfaces becoming rocks.

Game designer Claude Jerome has said that "the game is all about giving players options", like the ability to add a single flower versus a field of flowers just by resizing the flower paintbrush's size. He added that the game is also about "sharing and playing with the community", and that the difference between Project Spark and LittleBigPlanet or Minecraft is the core ability to customize the game down to the minutiae of the in-game object actions, which lets the players tell more individual stories. Players can control the game with the Xbox controller, touch controls or a keyboard/mouse combination.

Worlds created in the game are shareable. Other players who enter can use the world as created, and a duplicate world is created if they would like to make changes.

== Development ==
Project Spark, developed by Team Dakota, was announced during Microsoft's E3 2013 press event. Registration for its beta began in late June 2013. The game's cross-platform compatibility was demonstrated at Microsoft's Build 2013 developer conference. The system has been described as an evolution of concepts introduced in Microsoft's previous game creation tool Kodu Game Lab.

The game features the character Conker the Squirrel, with an episodic campaign for the game called Conker's Big Reunion, set 10 years after the events of Conker's Bad Fur Day. The first episode of the campaign was released in April 2015, but the remaining ones were cancelled the following September.

Initially the game was supported by microtransactions; however, in September 2015 Microsoft announced that the game would transition to a new "free and open creation" model by which all downloadable content would become free for both new and existing players starting from October 5, 2015. As part of the transition players who paid for such content after at most one month before the announcement were eligible for a refund based on what they had paid. Microsoft would cease the production of all the downloadable content, including future Conker episodes, after the last update was released on the same day.

On May 13, 2016, Microsoft announced that it had ceased all future development of Project Spark, and that it is no longer available to download effective immediately. Online services ended on August 12, 2016. Measures were implemented for those who had purchased the game before its transition to a free-to-play model.

The game is still playable, though with reduced features. Xbox users can play locally saved games, and can create new games but can't share them. PC Users can share the individual level files directly, or use the application SparkShare, which allows sharing of levels, assemblies, brains, and other assets.

== Reception ==
Reception

Aggregate scores
Aggregator	Score
GameRankings	74.15%
Metacritic	73/100

Review scores
Publication	Score
Game Informer	7.5/10
IGN	8/10
Hardcore Gamer	4/5

VentureBeat cited Project Spark as a "good example" of a game that takes advantage of Microsoft's investment in its ecosystem of products. IGN's Mitch Dyer called the game a fascinating "strange mixture of complex and rudimentary". Hardcore Gamer said "Project Spark is the most user-friendly game creation suite to date, enabling one to be crafted with less work than anything else like it on the market."

During the 18th Annual D.I.C.E. Awards, the Academy of Interactive Arts & Sciences nominated Project Spark for "Family Game of the Year" and "Outstanding Innovation in Gaming".

The video for Linkin Park's "Guilty All the Same" was made using Project Spark and is available to play in game using the community page.
