= WFRF-FM =

Christian radio station in Monticello–Tallahassee, Florida

- Monticello, Florida; United States
- Broadcast area: Tallahassee, Florida
- Frequency: 105.7 MHz
- Branding: Faith Radio

Programming
- Language: English
- Format: Religious

Ownership
- Owner: Faith Radio Network, Inc.
- Sister stations: WFRF

History
- First air date: 1989
- Former call signs: WJPH (1988–1997); WTAL-FM (1997–1999); WVHT (1999–2004)
- Call sign meaning: Faith Radio of Florida

Technical information
- Licensing authority: FCC
- Facility ID: 71405
- Class: C3
- ERP: 16,000 watts
- HAAT: 125 meters (410 ft)
- Transmitter coordinates: 30°23′8″N 83°50′5″W

Links
- Public license information: Public file; LMS
- Webcast: Listen live
- Website: www.faithradio.us

WFRF-FM (105.7 FM, "Faith Radio") is an American non-commercial educational radio station in Florida, United States. The station, established in 1989 as WJPH, is owned and operated by Faith Radio Network, Inc. Its studios are located in unincorporated Leon County, Florida, near Tallahassee, close to Lake Jackson and its transmitter is based in Jefferson County, Florida.

== Programming ==
WFRF-FM broadcasts a religious radio format to the Tallahassee metropolitan area. WFRF-FM programming is simulcast 24 hours a day on WFRU (90.1 FM). Notable national programs on WFRF-FM include Adventures in Odyssey, Bible Reading with Max McLean, Focus on the Family, Insight for Living with Chuck Swindoll, Joni and Friends with Joni Eareckson Tada, Love Worth Finding, My Money Life with Chuck Bentley, plus Unshackled! by the Pacific Garden Mission.

== History ==
=== Launch ===
Hyden Broadcasting Company filed an application with the Federal Communications Commission (FCC) in September 1987 for a new FM radio station to serve the community of Monticello, Florida. The new station would broadcast with 3,000 watts of effective radiated power on a frequency of 101.9 megahertz from an antenna 76 meters (249 ft) in height above average terrain. The FCC accepted this application for filing on April 27, 1988, and granted a construction permit on July 12, 1988, with a scheduled expiration date of January 12, 1990.

=== WJPH era ===
The new station was assigned its original call sign, WJPH, by the FCC on August 4, 1988. In October 1989, the completed station applied for its broadcast license. The FCC granted this license on November 21, 1990. Almost one year later, on November 12, 1991, the FCC authorized the station to double its effective radiated power to 6,000 watts.

In March 1992, license holder Hyden Broadcasting Company reached an agreement to transfer the license and assets of WJPH to Mayflower Broadcasting Corporation of Chicago, Illinois. On April 17, 1992, the station reported the involuntary transfer of control of Hyden Broadcasting from Jack P. Hyden Jr. to Opal R. Raines. The FCC approved the license transfer to Mayflower Broadcasting on May 7, 1992, and the transaction was formally consummated on June 8, 1992. Mayflower Broadcasting soon after became Webster Broadcasting.

The new owners applied to the FCC to increase the station's effective radiated power to 25,000 watts and relocate the broadcast transmitter to a new site on Old Pinhook Road in Wacissa, Florida, in June 1993. The FCC accepted the application for filing on July 14, 1993, and granted the new construction permit on March 3, 1994. In the meantime, Webster Broadcasting owner Charles R. Webster died on July 1, 1993, and control of the station passed to Mary S. Webster as the executor of his estate. She immediately reached an agreement to transfer WJPH's license and assets to PCG of Tallahassee, Inc. An informal objection was filed by W.W. Gunnels Jr., in August 1993 but denied in January 1994. The FCC approved the transfer on August 12, 1994, and the deal was apparently consummated on January 10, 1995.

The construction permit to build the new 25,000 watts transmitter site was scheduled to expire on September 3, 1995. When construction was not completed and in light of later filings by new owners, the permit was cancelled by the FCC. In November 1995, a new agreement for WJPH was reached with Rebus, Inc., to take control of the broadcast license. The FCC approved this deal on February 26, 1996, and the transaction formally consummated on April 3, 1996.

While the sale was in progress, the license holder applied to the FCC to change WJPH's broadcast power, antenna height and location, and support structure, along with switching from a directional antenna to a non-directional antenna. Driving these changes was a requested shift in frequency from 101.9 to 105.7 MHz. The FCC granted a construction permit for these changes on September 16, 1996, with a scheduled expiration date of March 16, 1998.

=== WTAL-FM years ===
With construction underway, Rebus, Inc., made a deal to transfer WJPH to Monti Radio, LLC. The FCC approved this transfer on January 22, 1997, and the deal was consummated on February 1, 1997. The new owners had the station's call sign changed to WTAL-FM on February 27, 1997. WTAL-FM began broadcasting on 105.7 MHz in March 1997 under program test authority and the station received its new broadcast license on April 30, 1998.

Monti Radio announced in December 1998 its intention to transfer WTAL-FM to W.W. & Nia, LLC. The FCC granted this request, with conditions, on February 19, 1999, and the transaction was consummated on April 22, 1999.

=== WVHT era ===
The FCC assigned new call sign WVHT to the station on May 19, 1999, at the request of the new owners. This ownership would prove short-lived as W.W. & Nia, LLC, filed an application with the FCC in January 2000 to transfer WVHT to Wilson Broadcasting, Inc., of Alabama. The transfer was approved on January 21, 2000, and the transaction consummated on February 2, 2000. WVHT broadcast an urban contemporary music format with a "Hot 105.7" branding.

=== WFRF-FM today ===
In October 2003, Wilson Broadcasting contracted to sell WVHT and all of its assets (except the station's 1996 Chevy Astro van) to Faith Radio Network, Inc., for $800,000 in cash. As of that filing, Faith Radio Network was owned in equal share by president Scott Biegle, vice-president Brenda Biegle, treasurer Herbert Shepherd, and corporation secretary Lola Shepherd. The FCC approved the deal on January 26, 2004, and the deal was consummated on February 5, 2004. At the new owner's request, the FCC changed the station's call sign to WFRF-FM on February 5, 2004, to match Faith Radio Network's other broadcast property, WFRF (1070 AM).

WFRF-FM began regular 24-hour broadcasting on February 17, 2004. In February 2004, WFRF-FM applied for a main studio waiver to allow it to broadcast from outside its city of license and farther than 25 miles from the center of that city. In August 2004, the station applied to convert its broadcast license from commercial broadcasting to a non-commercial educational license. The FCC granted both requests on November 2, 2004.

In August 2007, Faith Radio Network entered into a time brokerage agreement to operate WFRU (90.1 FM) with an option to purchase it from license holder Okaloosa Public Radio, Inc. As of October 2012, WFRU is now owned by Faith Radio Network, Inc.

== FM satellite stations ==
WFRF-FM operates four full-power satellite stations across northern Florida and southern Georgia

Broadcast translators for WFRF-FM
| Call sign | Frequency | City of license | FID | ERP (W) | HAAT | Class | Transmitter coordinates | FCC info | Notes |
|---|---|---|---|---|---|---|---|---|---|
| WZFR | 104.5 FM | Eastpoint, Florida | 183319 | 11,500 | 147 m (482 ft) | C3 | 29°43′58″N 84°53′24″W | LMS | Formerly WOYY (Feb–Sep 2010) |
| WOLR | 91.3 FM | Lake City, Florida | 73398 | 18,000 | 87.57 m (287 ft) | C3 | 29°43′58″N 84°53′24″W | LMS | |
| WBGP | 91.3 FM | Moultrie, Georgia | 172461 | 5,500 | 100.1 m (328 ft) | A | 31°12′55″N 83°47′13″W | LMS | |
| WFRU | 90.1 FM | Quincy, Florida | 85909 | 32,000 | 100 m (328 ft) | C2 | 30°42′23″N 84°37′39″W | LMS | |

== Outreach ==
Working with International Christian Ministries, Faith Radio raised money for a mission trip for its founders and more than a dozen WFRF listeners to help establish a Christian radio station in Kenya. Imani Radio (88.8 FM) launched in May 2005 as one of just four Christian radio stations in Kenya. ("Imani" means "faith" in the Swahili language.)

Faith Radio also raised funds to provide 2,500 solar-powered radios pre-tuned to Imani Radio for use in Kenyan villages, hospitals, and prisons. This last effort inspired to a new drive to provide solar-powered radios to prisoners in Florida's Big Bend region. Starting with a single prison and 250 radios that prisoners could check out, as they would a book from a library, by 2009 the program had grown to more than 1200 radios in 8 prisons across the region. These radios are tuned to receive only WFRF/WFRF-FM programming.
