= WPFM =

- Panama City, Florida; United States
- Frequency: 107.9 MHz
- Branding: K-LOVE

Programming
- Format: Contemporary Christian

Ownership
- Owner: Educational Media Foundation

History
- First air date: September 4, 1964
- Former call signs: WDJJ (1964); WMAI-FM (1965–1973); WPFM (1973–1997); WDRK (1997–1998); WLHR (1998–2004); WPFM-FM (2004–2014)

Technical information
- Licensing authority: FCC
- Facility ID: 42372
- Class: C1
- ERP: 54,000 watts
- HAAT: 386 meters (1,266 ft)
- Transmitter coordinates: 30°25′59″N 85°24′51″W

Links
- Public license information: Public file; LMS
- Website: http://www.klove.com

WPFM, branded as "K-Love", is a commercial radio station located in Panama City, Florida, licensed to broadcast on 107.9 FM. WPFM is owned and operated by Educational Media Foundation and formerly aired a Rhythmic Top 40 music format branded as "Hot 107.9".

== History ==
The station signed on September 4, 1964 as WMAI-FM; the station had initially been issued the call sign WDJJ, but changed to WMAI-FM upon launch. At the time, it was affiliated with WBVI-TV, the predecessor of WMBB. It became WPFM on May 15, 1973, playing a beautiful music format until 1978. In 1978, the format was changed to a mix of Top 40 and Adult Contemporary. It was in this era of WPFM that they developed an equal following from both locals and tourists, and were known sponsors of big-name Spring Break events in the area. It would later be the city's dominant CHR station. In 1992, after some months off the air due to legal issues, WPFM became exclusively Top 40, and rebranded to "Power 108". In September 1993, they began calling themselves "Kiss FM", which only lasted over a month. From then until 1995, they played alternative rock under the name "107.9 The Zone". In 1995, they went back to Top 40 under the name "Mix 108".

WPFM and WDRK swapped formats on November 21, 1997. As a result, WPFM took WDRK's calls and active rock format, while the original WDRK changed their own to WMXP and adopted the "Mix" name, "Mix 103". The new "Rock 108" was ill-fated, and the calls were changed again on October 5, 1998, to WLHR. From this came the widely successful Top 40 station "Hot 107.9". WLHR was changed to WPFM-FM on March 10, 2004, before returning to the WPFM call sign (without the "-FM" suffix) on October 14, 2014.

On September 21, 2018, Powell Broadcasting announced that it had sold WPFM to the Educational Media Foundation, but planned to keep "Hot 107.9" up until the end of the year.

On October 14, 2018, four days after Hurricane Michael destroyed the facilities that housed WPFM, Powell Broadcasting announced that it had ceased the operations of all of its Panama City radio stations, citing "catastrophic" damage. This expedited EMF's decision to get K-Love on the air by just under a month.

On December 4, 2018, WPFM signed on once again, this time under Educational Media Foundation's K-Love moniker, airing a contemporary Christian music format.
