= Conker (series) =

Video game series

- Genre: Platform
- Developers: Rare (1999–2005); Team Dakota (2015); Asobo Studio (2016)
- Publishers: Rare (1999–2001); THQ (2001); Xbox Game Studios (2005–present)
- Creator: Rare
- Platforms: Game Boy Color, Nintendo 64, Xbox, Xbox One, Xbox Series X, Microsoft Windows, Microsoft HoloLens, Nintendo Classics
- First release: Conker's Pocket Tales; 8 June 1999
- Latest release: Young Conker; 29 January 2016

Conker is a series of platform video games created and produced by Rare. It chronicles the events of Conker the Squirrel, an anthropomorphic red squirrel that made his debut as a playable character in Diddy Kong Racing.

While debuting as a family-friendly series, starting with Conker's Pocket Tales, it has shifted focus to mature audiences with the development and release of Conker's Bad Fur Day; during development, the game was modified to incorporate graphic violence, strong language, offensive humor, and other mature content. These changes resulted in the title receiving a Mature rating from the ESRB, accompanied by a content advisory displayed on the packaging and the title screen when immediately powered on to caution unsuspecting viewers who might otherwise mistake it for a platformer intended for a younger audience. A graphically improved remake of Conker's Bad Fur Day, along with new multiplayer modes, was released as Conker: Live & Reloaded on June 21, 2005 in North America for the original Xbox. Conker's Bad Fur Day was released on Rare Replay and Live & Reloaded has been made backward compatible with the Xbox One and the Xbox Series X.

== Games ==
Release timeline
1999	Conker's Pocket Tales
2000
2001	Conker's Bad Fur Day
2002–2004
2005	Conker: Live & Reloaded
2006–2014
2015	Conker's Big Reunion
2016	Young Conker

- Conker's Pocket Tales (1999) - Game Boy Color
- Conker's Bad Fur Day (2001) - Nintendo 64
- Conker: Live & Reloaded (2005) - Xbox, PC
- Young Conker (2016) - Microsoft HoloLens

=== Related games ===
- Diddy Kong Racing (1997) - Nintendo 64
- Project Spark (Conker's Big Reunion) (2014) - Xbox One
- Rare Replay (2015) - Xbox One

== Development ==
Conker was introduced at the Electronic Entertainment Expo in 1997. The game Conker's Quest was presented by Rare as a 3D platformer aimed at a young audience for the Nintendo 64. Later the same year, Conker's inclusion in Diddy Kong Racing for the Nintendo 64 was confirmed. In early 1998, Conker's Quest was renamed Twelve Tales: Conker 64. In 1999, Conker made his first solo debut in Conker's Pocket Tales for the Game Boy Color.

During development of the Conker series, Rareware had struggled to release Twelve Tales: Conker 64, formerly named Conker's Quest, citing issues with project management in addition to oversaturation of Mario 64-style games in the gaming market at the time, Realizing that Conker 64 lacked any uniqueness as a platform game, they cancelled Conker 64 and restarted the project. Multiple delays and a lack of updates led the press to believe that Twelve Tales was quietly cancelled.

In 2000, Twelve Tales: Conker 64 was retooled into Conker's Bad Fur Day with a large amount of scatological humour. Conker the Squirrel, who previously appeared as a family-friendly character, was retooled to be a foul-mouthed, fourth-wall breaking alcoholic armed with guns, throwing knives, and a frying pan. After E3, Chris Seavor came on board as designer. The first level, the beehive, added machine guns shooting wasps which Rare found funny and kept going with this idea to be raunchy and different. After two more years of development, the game emerged as Conker's Bad Fur Day, which targets adults rather than children with its mature content. According to Rare co-founder Chris Stamper: "When people grow up on games, they don't stop playing. There aren't games for people who grew up on the early systems". The game suffered from relatively poor sales, but received a cult following.

After the release of Conker's Bad Fur Day, Rare began development of a new Conker game referred to as Conker's Other Bad Day. Designer Chris Seavor said that it was to be a direct sequel dealing with "Conker's somewhat unsuccessful tenure as King. He spends all the treasury money on beer, parties and hookers. Thrown into prison, Conker is faced with the prospect of execution and the game starts with his escape, ball and chain attached, from the Castle's highest tower". It was never confirmed which console Conker's Other Bad Day was for, but it was likely the Nintendo GameCube as with Donkey Kong Racing. In 2002, Microsoft purchased Rare from Nintendo, so instead of finishing and releasing the game, Rare remade Conker's Bad Fur Day for the Xbox in 2005, renaming it Conker: Live & Reloaded. It features improved graphics and minor alterations to gameplay, and was also censored. It has a new multiplayer adaptation for Xbox Live. After Live & Reloaded, Rare started development on Conker: Gettin' Medieval, an online multiplayer third-person shooter game, but it was ultimately cancelled.

At E3 2014, Conker was announced as a character in Project Spark. In 2015, Conker returned in a new episodic campaign for Project Spark. The campaign, titled Conker's Big Reunion, is set ten years after the events of Bad Fur Day and Seavor reprised his voice role. The first episode was released on 23 April the same year for Project Spark; however, before any more additional episodes could be made, Project Spark's online services were shut down and the game was abandoned. In 2015, Conker's Bad Fur Day was included in the Rare Replay video game compilation for Xbox One.

In 2016, Microsoft announced Young Conker as the next installment into the series, released for the Microsoft HoloLens. The trailer was released in February and was almost universally panned by the public, with many complaining that it lacked the humor and overall style of its predecessors. The trailer received more than 30,000 dislikes against just over 1,000 likes. A petition was created to cancel the game's release but failed. Some video game critics and general YouTube commentators have boycotted the game.

== Reception ==
Reception for the Conker series has been largely focused on the protagonist of the series, Conker the Squirrel, and the critical success of the games Conker's Bad Fur Day and Live and Reloaded. The contrast between Conker's innocent appearance and his coarse behavior has been well-received by the public. Critics have noted that the storylines and variety of characters for Conker's Bad Fur Day and Live and Reloaded in combination with the crude humor and seemingly innocent graphics are noteworthy appeal to mature audiences. Rare listed Conker as the fifth Rare's video game character who most improved with age.

Jordan Devore of Destructoid stated about Conker's appearance in Project Spark (Conker's Big Reunion DLC) that there "was no getting around the disappointment of seeing a long abandoned (but never forgotten!) character return not in his own adventure, but in a DLC pack for a videogame about making games." Conker's appearance on the Microsoft HoloLens trailer for Young Conker received mostly negative reviews. Chris Plante of The Verge criticized it and said that "Young Conker doesn't feature the original Conker." Sam Loveridge of Digital Spy claimed that the scene of Conker and the bees is "weird."

== See also ==
- Robotman, another character introduced as a children's character but eventually reworked into a satirical adult character.
