= Club La Vela =

Nightclub in Panama Beach, Florida

- Interactive map of Club La Vela
- Address: 8813 Thomas Dr
- Location: Panama City Beach, Florida
- Coordinates: 30°10′09″N 85°47′40″W
- Owner: Patrick Pfeffer; Thorsten Pfeffer
- Type: Nightclub

Construction
- Opened: 1984
- Closed: 2018

Club La Vela was a nightclub owned by Patrick and Thorsten Pfeffer located in Panama City Beach, Florida. It was once billed as the largest nightclub in the United States. The club gained most of its fame and infamy in the 1990s during the weeks of spring break when thousands of college students converge on the club. The club was heavily damaged in a hurricane and has not been reconstructed.

== History ==
The original LaVela bar was built next to Spinnaker with ground breaking in the spring and Summer of 1978. In 1984 the club was rebuilt as the La Vela Beach Club and Concert Hall;the venue was designed by Walton Chancey and Timothy Packard Architects. It was originally owned by Alois Pfeffer and George Christo and after the initial season in the fall of 1984, Mr. Pfeffer became the sole owner in early 1985 and began the expansion that would eventually make LaVela Beach Club and Concert Hall, Club LaVela and the "World's Largest Nightclub". From the sinking of the original support pilings in the summer of 1984, LaVela (as it was first known) was constructed in 54 days culminating in a Grand Opening on Labor Day 1984, and an opening evening concert by John Prine. The building was Mr. Chancey's thesis from the School of Architecture at Auburn University.

The original management team was headed by Willian Bass C.P.A., Gordon Hundley (deceased), Jimmy Christo Jr., and Clifford A. Becker. Alois Pfeffer himself an engineer, architect and international entrepreneur was instrumental in advising the recently graduated and certified architect team of Chancey & Packard. Originally set to cost $400,000 U.S., overtime exceeded that figure on the project alone. Alois Pfeffer continued to support the project through its infancy with money and expertise culminating in the grand opening.

Original performing acts the first season included Ramsey Lewis, Gregg Allman, Robin Trower, Tom T. Hall, Pure Prairie League, Leon Redbone, The Outlaws and a host of others. The original venue was much smaller than it is presently, and in pre-reopening expansion, after a brief winter hiatus in November and December 1984, an outdoor band shell was added along with extended deck space and subsequently through the early years Mr. Pfeffer with the support of his wife and sons, oversaw the growth of the club. The club has added nine so-called "theme rooms", and additional dance floors, swimming pools, bars and more. With the addition of longtime resident DJ John Hulsey, as music director, several "Live Mix Shows" started in the late 80's and through 1999.

From 1997 to 1999, World Championship Wrestling hosted an annual episode of WCW Monday Nitro at the venue in March (the event emanated from South Padre Island in Texas in 2000). The purpose of each of the annual "Spring Break-Out" episodes was to gain favor with adolescent and young adult viewers who were not familiar with Nitro. The nearby Boardwalk Beach Resort was the site for the final episode of Nitro on March 26, 2001.

== The club today ==
Club La Vela's main stage and pool deck area at night

Currently, Club La Vela's capacity stands at 6,000 patrons, and the club has evolved into a major entertainment complex. Different dance rooms cater to fans of house music, trance, rock and hip hop; one room also features foam blowers. During summer and spring break, the club also features "The Darkroom", a venue for patrons under 18 years old, and the club periodically hosts "Teenbashes", on Sundays in which the club is open only to teens and there is no alcohol service.

Because of its popularity during spring break, Club La Vela has been the focus of numerous media reports and events. MTV has made the club its home during numerous spring breaks over the past decade. The club is known for its bikini and wet T-shirt contests for women and "hard body" contests for men. Club La Vela has also been featured by E! and is the home party spot to the "Girls Next Door" and the Playboy Crew, and its original show Wild On.... Other cable and broadcast channels featuring Club La Vela include ESPN, TNT, Travel Channel, MSNBC, French channel Canal Plus and Germany's RTL II and Pro7. Dozens of retail brands have sponsored various events at the club.

On January 6, 2014, Pfeffer expanded into broadcasting by taking over the operations of WPCF, an AM radio station in Panama City that also simulcasts on an FM translator. The station plays a Dance format billed as "93.1 Play FM" and will serve as a tie-in to the club's events and activities.

The club has been the subject of numerous reports that it has been sold and is closing to make way for high-rise condominiums. Reports had the club closing after the 2005 spring break rush, but the club remained.

In 2018, Hurricane Michael caused the club to close indefinitely. As of 2022, it remains closed with no announced re-open date. In mid-2021 rumors started to circulate on social media claiming that the club would not be reopening sometime in the future and that it was planned to be demolished. There has been no confirmation from the owners regarding these claims. Meanwhile, the owners have been out of the country and recently surfaced in the media after escaping from a Russian military advance in Ukraine.

== Legal issues ==
Largely because of its size, popularity, party atmosphere and frequent media coverage, Club La Vela has been subject of several run-ins with the authorities. Occasional troubles with the Bay County sheriff have occurred over the years, with little or no legal action resulting against the club itself or its owners. However, that changed in June 2001, when the owners and the club's corporate parent Sea Watch of Panama City Beach, Inc. were indicted by a federal grand jury for violating a federal statute which makes venue owners liable for the drug use of their patrons. The charges were the end result of a five-year investigation of Club La Vela.

At the October 2001 trial, prosecutors showed the jury BlowPops, chewing gum and glow sticks that were seized in the raid. The items were presented as evidence of drug use, despite no evidence of actual drugs. After just more than an hour of deliberation, the jury found the defendants not guilty on all counts. A federal grand jury which heard all the evidence cleared the club and its owners of all charges. The club has since hired former law enforcement veterans to generally run their security.
