= Crown Financial Ministries =

Evangelical Christian ministry

- Type: Non-profit
- Industry: Personal finance Career; Business
- Founded: 1976, merged in 2000
- Headquarters: Knoxville, TN, United States
- Key people: Larry Burkett, Co-founder; Howard Dayton, Co-founder; Chuck Bentley, CEO
- Revenue: 5,461,243 United States dollar (2017)
- Total assets: 6,948,002 United States dollar (2022)
- Website: www.crown.org

Crown Financial Ministries or Crown is a nondenominational, evangelical Christian ministry with the mission of "equipping servant leaders to live by God's design for their finances, work and life ... to advance transformation".

== Background ==
Crown Financial Ministries was formed in 2000 by a merger of Larry Burkett's Christian Financial Concepts, (founded 1976), and Howard Dayton's Crown Ministries, (founded 1985). Burkett focused his ministry on mass media (including his radio show, Money Matters and a number of books), Bible studies, seminars, and building a volunteer coaching ministry, while Dayton focused on small group Bible studies combining biblical financial principles with practical application for budgeting and personal finances.

The two had met in the 1990s and quickly became friends. They considered the merger expedient due to the missions of their two groups, and Burkett's health. Burkett was chairman of the board of the combined entity until his 2003 death from heart failure. Dayton was CEO from the time of the merger until 2007 when Chuck Bentley became CEO.

== Activities ==
A radio show, Crown Radio: Money Matters aired on 1,100 radio stations. An estimated 2,000,000 listeners in the US listen to the program, which is also aired in Africa, Australia and China. A Spanish-language version is aired in 23 countries. As of April 2008 the show was renamed MoneyLife and hosted by Chuck Bentley. Howard Dayton stepped aside as host and CEO to focus on writing books and speaking, but remains actively involved in Crown, according to their website.

The message is similar to the teachings of financial talk show host Dave Ramsey that getting out of debt and controlling one's expectation of living are important parts of Christian discipleship. Dave Ramsey credits the co-founder Larry Burkett as one of his mentors who helped him get out of debt and form his thoughts and ideas on finances. While they acknowledge there is no direct admonition in the Bible against assuming debt, they heavily discourage taking it on.

Christian financial planner Gary Moore criticized Crown in 2006 for what he considers an aversion to taking on debt.
