= Conker's Pocket Tales =

1999 video game

- North American box art
- Developer: Rare
- Publisher: Rare
- Designers: Gary Richards; Gareth Jones
- Programmer: Richard Brough
- Artist: Keri Gunn
- Composers: Eveline Fischer; Robin Beanland
- Series: Conker
- Platform: Game Boy Color
- Release: NA: June 8, 1999; EU: July 1999
- Genre: Action-adventure
- Mode: Single-player

Conker's Pocket Tales is a 1999 action-adventure game developed and published by Rare for the Game Boy Color. It is the first game in the Conker series and follows the story of Conker the Squirrel as he retrieves his stolen birthday presents and rescues his girlfriend Berri, who has been kidnapped by the Evil Acorn. The cartridge is dual-format, allowing it to also run on the original Game Boy and the Super Game Boy with some gameplay differences.

== Gameplay ==
Conker's Pocket Tales follows the story of Conker as he retrieves his birthday presents and rescues his girlfriend Berri after they were stolen and she was kidnapped by the Evil Acorn. The game is played from a top-down perspective, with Conker exploring large environments in an attempt to find all his stolen presents. By collecting a certain number of presents in each area and defeating a boss, players unlock access to the next one. In addition to standard running and jumping, Conker can perform a mid-air ground-pounding attack that can hit buttons to solve puzzles. Conker also has the ability to dig up patches of soft dirt, emerging at another predetermined patch to reach inaccessible areas, and uses a slingshot to defeat enemies or hit distant switches. Puzzles are also solved by pushing blocks into grooves in the floor.

The game can be played on both Game Boy and Game Boy Color. However, the layout and some events in the game are different depending on the console it is played on. The game can be paused and saved anywhere when played on a Game Boy Color or later model, but can only be saved at specific save points when played on a non-color Game Boy.

== Development and release ==
Conker's Pocket Tales is the first Game Boy Color game that was developed by Rare. The game was released in 1999 for North America on June 8 and for Europe in July. Development began after the release of Donkey Kong Land III in 1997. Rare sought to make an action-adventure game in the vein of The Legend of Zelda, with a darker tone in the vein of gothic films. After seeing early versions of Conker's Bad Fur Day, they decided to remove the gothic theme and replace it with a fantasy theme, with Conker as its main character. The entire score was composed by Robin Beanland, with Eveline Fischer programming it into the Game Boy. The Entertainment Software Rating Board (ESRB) rated Conker's Pocket Tales as E for Everyone, at a time when the series had not yet been reoriented toward a more mature audience, a shift that would come with Conker's Bad Fur Day. Like with other Rare-developed games at the time, Nintendo handled physical distribution of the game.

== Reception ==
Reception

Aggregate score
Aggregator	Score
GameRankings	55%

Review scores
Publication	Score
AllGame	3/5
Computer and Video Games	2/5
Game Informer	4.5/10
IGN	6/10
N64 Magazine	5/5
Nintendo Power	7.5/10
Official Nintendo Magazine	91%
Player One	62%
Planet Game Boy	5/5

Conker's Pocket Tales received mixed reviews from critics. N64 Magazine considered it as one of the best Game Boy Color games at the time of its release. IGN contributor Adam Cleveland that while it was not a masterpiece, it still showed Rare as a leading developer in 8-bit titles. Nintendo Power staff felt the game took full advantage of the Game Boy Color's space in terms of graphics and gameplay. On the other hand, a disappointed Andrew Reiner of Game Informer, criticized the game as having "insulting" gameplay, a boring premise, and starring an "annoying little squirrel".

The most enthusiastic reviews of Conker's Pocket Tales highlighted its depth, Official Nintendo Magazine calling it "one huge adventure you've gotta play". Planet Game Boy magazine praised the game's size and included minigames, stating that Pocket Tales is "a real grower" and that its lengthy lifespan of 20 hours "will fly by". Similarly, N64 Magazine wrote that the game is "far more engrossing than you'd expect it to be after [its] dismal start", highlighting its length, puzzles and exploration aspect. Staff from Nintendo Power praised its length, number of mini-games, and a challenge level suitable for both young and experienced players. Conversely, Player One's Carlito, opined that despite it being a decent action adventure title with "funny action" and a high number of levels, bosses and collectable weapons, the game was easy (especially with its repetitive puzzles) to the point of being beatable quickly. Dean Scott of Computer and Video Games found its gameplay too repetitive, as well as the environments and enemies too dull, for the player to be immersed in it.

Comparisons were frequently made to The Legend of Zelda: Link's Awakening, and many reviewers, even favorable ones, felt Conker's Pocket Tales was not as good. Carlito called it as playable as Link's Awakening, particularly with its controls. Reiner also acknowledged Conker's movements and that there were "noble and interesting" design choices.
