= Conker: Live & Reloaded =

2005 platform game

- North America cover art
- Developer: Rare
- Publisher: Microsoft Game Studios
- Designer: Chris Seavor
- Programmer: Chris Marlow
- Artists: Stephen McFarlane; Peter Hentze; Louise Ridgeway; Brooks Nelson
- Composer: Robin Beanland
- Series: Conker
- Platform: Xbox
- Release: NA: 21 June 2005; EU: 24 June 2005; AU: 7 July 2005
- Genres: Platform, action-adventure
- Modes: Single-player, multiplayer

Conker: Live & Reloaded is a 2005 platform game developed by Rare and published by Microsoft Game Studios for the Xbox. It is a remake of the 2001 game Conker's Bad Fur Day for the Nintendo 64, with a new multiplayer mode using Xbox Live that is different from the original. Development started the moment Rare was bought by Microsoft in 2002. The game was made available as a part of Xbox One's backwards compatibility program on 17 April 2018 and then as one of four initial games included in the Xbox Backwards Compatibility for PC program on 22 July 2026; it subsequently became available across all tiers of Xbox Game Pass.

== Gameplay ==
In terms of the single-player, the gameplay is identical to Conker's Bad Fur Day. Differences are very few, including enemies and new weapons like a baseball bat with nails on it.

=== Multiplayer ===
The multiplayer in Live & Reloaded uses the same third-person perspective as the single-player game. Multiplayer consists of different game modes such as Capture the Flag or the standard Deathmatch modes. The player may participate as a member of the SHC or the Tediz. As well as a choice of a soldier, the game has a choice of "classes" which significantly affect play style.

Each class has its own special equipment, special abilities, and physical capabilities, each being designed for a distinct purpose. They are also designed to have advantages against certain classes while being vulnerable to others. For example, the Thermophile's flamethrower inflicts extreme damage on Sneekers and Long Rangers, who have less health, but is virtually useless against the high-vitality Demolisher. Each class comes equipped with a primary weapon with unlimited ammunition (although reloading of the weapon is still required), a limited stock of grenades, and at least one special ability. Each class can also choose from several specialist ordnance items and vehicles unique to the class, which can be obtained at stations in team bases (however, an option is available to the host of a server to disable one or both features). Abilities common to all classes are the ability to shoulder all weapons for extra running speed, and a Spray Can that can be used to apply the player's avatar image to walls to mock human opponents. Scattered throughout the arenas are yellow Upgrade Orbs, which grant a player more equipment and abilities when obtained. A player loses his upgrade orb upon death, allowing another player to obtain it.

Terminals are found in every mission, usually near a base. Terminals are computers that dispense useful items or vehicles, and can be accessed by a player during the game. When accessed, the player is given a menu of the available items. When an item is chosen it can be picked up at an adjacent dispenser area. The objects received from the terminals disappear upon the death of the player that obtained them. Terminals may be neutral and available to both sides, or under the control of one side. Terminals can be attacked and disabled, but not destroyed. If damaged or disabled, they can be repaired with an arc weld, issued to the Demolisher and Sky Jockey classes. Neutral or enemy-controlled terminals can be hacked with a Sneeker's hacking device. There are two types of terminals: Specialist Ordinance terminals, and Mobile Units terminals.

== Plot ==
The plot of the single-player mode is identical to that of Conker's Bad Fur Day, apart from a fourth wall break in the tutorial chapter of the game. On a bridge leading to the exit of the tutorial stage, Conker encounters a large anthropomorphic gargoyle. Conker hits the gargoyle with a frying pan, but it does not fall off the bridge like it did in the original game. Aware of how the scene played out in the original game, Conker asks the gargoyle why it did not fall off the bridge. The gargoyle explains that the designers wanted to "fool the audience into thinking the rest of the game would also be different", and that it was therefore not simply a remake. Told he will have to try something else, Conker pulls out a baseball bat and strikes the gargoyle on the head, causing it to fall backward and be crushed by a boulder dislodged by the impact.

== Development ==
Conker's Bad Fur Day (2001) was one of the final Nintendo 64 titles, released just after the debut of PlayStation 2 and shortly before the launches of the GameCube and Xbox. However, the game's adult humor conflicted with Nintendo's reputation of being a family-friendly brand. The game was not an instant commercial success, attributable to its high price and being released near the end of the console's lifespan. Rare was purchased by Microsoft in 2002, with the game being one of Rare's last games on Nintendo consoles. Development started shortly afterwards.

The game was originally titled Conker: Live and Uncut and was to feature a completely uncensored single-player experience. At some point during the development of the game, this was changed and the game was released with even more censorship to its dialogue than the N64 original. The censorship included that of some obscenities which were present in the original N64 version (in which only the word "fuck", its variations and a couple, but not all, uses of the word "shit" were bleeped out). This drew criticism from fans of the original, especially as it detracted from comedic highlights such as the "Great Mighty Poo" song in the Sloprano chapter. This song was also censored on the soundtrack, although Rare once had the uncensored Xbox version of the song on their website.

Like the original, the game received a Mature rating from the ESRB and carried warnings about its content as well as Rare's promotional spoof warnings which advertised the fact that the content of the game was explicitly 'adult'.

== Reception ==
Reception

Aggregate scores
Aggregator	Score
GameRankings	78.98%
Metacritic	78/100

Review scores
Publication	Score
1Up.com	7.5/10
4Players	85%
Edge	8/10
Electronic Gaming Monthly	6.67/10
Eurogamer	4/10
Famitsu	28/40
Game Informer	8/10
GameRevolution	B
GameSpot	8.3/10
GameSpy	4/5
GameZone	9/10
IGN	8.1/10
Jeuxvideo.com	17/20
Official Xbox Magazine (US)	8/10
Detroit Free Press	3/4
The Sydney Morning Herald	4/5

Conker: Live & Reloaded was received positively by critics for its presentation and graphics. The game was named IGN's "Best of E3 2005" in the category of "Best Graphics" for Xbox.

GameZone praised Conker: Live & Reloaded for its improvements on the original, such as controls, camera, and graphics. The review noted "a new targeting system that takes advantage of strafing and feels very comfortable on the Xbox controller". On the other hand, IGN criticised for changes to the single player campaign compared to the original, such as the removal of certain challenges, and the lack of refinement in areas such as facial animation that was perfected on the Nintendo 64.

IGN considered the multiplayer to be inferior to that of the original game. The multiplayer mode (new in this version of the game) remained popular well into 2007 (over a year and a half since its release) when it remained in the top 10 most played online titles for its platform.

Maxim gave it a perfect ten and stated that, "up to 16 people can torch each other. It's more of everything you loved (and decent people protested)." The New York Times gave it a favorable review, stating, "The game is essentially a burlesque of every game featuring cute forest creatures. It has the sort of platform-jumping, rope-climbing, monster-whomping challenges seen in many of these games, but adds foulmouthed animals, scatological humor and gallons of vividly scarlet cartoon blood." The Sydney Morning Herald gave it four stars out of five and said, "The potty humour will not be to everyone's taste but many films are hilariously lampooned." However, Jim Schaefer of Detroit Free Press gave it three stars out of four and said that he found it "amusing to relive some of Conker's bawdy behavior, but I wish they would have come up with a new story rather than remaking the old one." In Japan, Famitsu gave it a score of all four sevens, for a total of 28 out of 40.
