= WLTG =

Radio station in Panama City, Florida

Simulcasting WFRF
- Upper Grand Lagoon, Florida; United States
- Broadcast area: Panama City area
- Frequency: 1430 kHz
- Branding: Radio Fe

Programming
- Language: Spanish
- Format: Spanish Christian

Ownership
- Owner: Faith Radio Network, Inc.

History
- First air date: December 11, 1949 (as WPCF at 1400)
- Former call signs: WPCF (1949–1978); WWWQ (1978–1985); WKSD (1985–1986)
- Former frequencies: 1400 kHz (1949–1958)
- Call sign meaning: We Look To God

Technical information
- Licensing authority: FCC
- Facility ID: 27694
- Class: D
- Power: 125 watts day 60 watts night
- Transmitter coordinates: 30°10′44.7″N 85°46′54.8″W
- Translator: 101.7 W269DR (Panama City)

Links
- Public license information: Public file; LMS
- Webcast: Listen Live
- Website: faithradio.us

WLTG (1430 AM) is a radio station broadcasting a Spanish Christian format. Licensed to Upper Grand Lagoon, Florida, United States, the station serves the Panama City area. WLTG has the distinction of being one of the radio stations with the lowest daytime power of any licensed AM station in the USA. It is one of a few radio stations with a daytime power of less than 250 watts. The station is currently owned by Faith Radio Network, Inc.

== History ==
The station went on the air as WPCF on December 11, 1949, as an affiliate of the ABC Radio Network. The callsign originally stood for "Panama City, Florida". The signal moved from 1400 to 1430 kHz in 1958; the change enabled a power increase from 250 to 5,000 watts.

From the 1950s until 1971, the station experimented with Christian programming numerous times. PCF would come to stand for Put Christ First (this would be marketed even after its move to 1290 kHz in 1979 up until its call sign change in 1994.) From 1971 to 1973, WPCF was an affiliate of the "Happy Day Radio" network, a syndicated Top 40 format.

On June 7, 1978, WPCF became WWWQ, and began broadcasting under an AC format under the name 3WQ. On September 15, 1982, keeping the 3WQ moniker, its format switched to country music. This lasted until March 11, 1985, when the station changed its call sign and branding to the big-band/oldies WKSD, Stardust 1430. WKSD would assume its present calls of WLTG on February 19, 1986.

Originally a Contemporary Christian station, WLTG would occasionally broadcast baseball and football games (mostly those of the Atlanta Braves). In mid-1991, the format was switched to CNN Headline News. The NewsTalk 1430 branding would be adopted around the launch of FM simulcast WYOO in 1993, which would be sold to Styles Media in 1996.

On December 28, 2018, a construction permit was granted for an FM translator. This new station on 101.7 MHz launched under the callsign W269DR on January 1, 2019.

On September 23, 2020, WLTG changed their format from news/talk to rhythmic contemporary, branded as "Hot 101.7". Effective October 29, 2020, the station was granted authorization for a new community of license, moving from Panama City to Upper Grand Lagoon, and the transmitter power was downgraded from 5,000 watts to 125 watts day, and 60 watts night.

On July 12, 2021, WLTG changed their format from rhythmic contemporary to tropical rock. Effective August 1, 2021, the station flipped to a simulcast of Spanish Christian “Radio Fe” heard on WFRF, operated under a lease by Faith Broadcasting.
