= Chuck Bentley =

American businessman

- Born: July 2, 1957; Wichita Falls, Texas
- Education: Business Administration
- Alma mater: Baylor University
- Occupation: CEO at Crown Financial Ministries
- Title: CEO
- Spouse: Ann Bentley
- Children: 4

Chuck Bentley is the current chief executive officer for Crown Financial Ministries. He has previously served Crown Financial Ministries as senior vice president of Global Impact Group, vice president of the US Field, state director of Texas, and area director in Dallas–Fort Worth, Texas. Bentley is also the founder and CEO of the Christian Economic Forum.

Bentley has traveled throughout the world teaching biblical financial principles to the affluent, middle class, poor and "ultra poor". Bentley is the co-creator of the Crown Money Map, a contributor to Saddleback Church's small group series, Managing Our Finances God's Way, and is currently writing and producing a series of short films designed to convey God's principles of provision and sustainability through dramatic Bible stories seldom captured in visual media. Bentley brings to Crown visionary leadership that connects with all generations and is a dynamic speaker who inspires his audience with a strong scriptural emphasis.
