= WPCF =

- Panama City Beach, Florida; United States
- Broadcast area: Panama City area
- Frequency: 1290 kHz

Programming
- Format: Christian radio

Ownership
- Owner: Faith Radio Network, Inc.

History
- First air date: September 23, 1958
- Former call signs: WSCM (1958–1979), WDLP (1994–2000)
- Call sign meaning: Panama City, Florida, or Put Christ First

Technical information
- Licensing authority: FCC
- Facility ID: 13012
- Class: D
- Power: 270 watts day 55 watts night
- Transmitter coordinates: 30°10′44.00″N 85°46′55.00″W
- Translator: 93.1 MHz (W226CJ—Panama City)

Links
- Public license information: Public file; LMS

WPCF (1290 AM) is a Christian radio station licensed to Panama City Beach, Florida, USA. The station is owned by Faith Radio Network, Inc.

As a dance station, WPCF played talk-free Mainstream Dance Music each day, and then wide spectrum of EDM (electronic dance music). During the weekends the station also aired≈ a number of syndicated shows including "Future Sound of Egypt with Aly & Fila", "UMF Radio", "Kryteria Radio with Kryder", "The Remix Top 30 with Hollywood Hamilton", Drumcode Radio with Adam Beyer, and a number of weekly guest mixes.

On September 8, 2017, WPCF's FM translator changed frequencies from 93.9 to 92.9 MHz & increased power from 90 watts to 250 watts. On March 1, 2018, WPCF's translator switched frequencies again from 92.9 to 93.1 MHz due to interference from WBLX-FM out of Mobile, Alabama on the same frequency.

== History ==
The station first signed on as WSCM on September 23, 1958, its callsign standing for "We Serve Country Music". Like WPAP would almost a decade later, they broadcast live sermons every Sunday. The station was assigned the callsign WPCF on April 1, 1979, after the original WPCF left the 1430 spot. On June 6, 1994, the station changed its call sign to WDLP then again on March 10, 2000, to the current WPCF.

Final logo as PLAY-FM

On January 6, 2014, WPCF dropped its Trop-Rock format for all Dance and Electronic music, becoming "93.9 PLAY-FM" which is now on 93.1 as of March 1, 2018 under the operations of Patrick Pfeffer, owner of Club La Vela, a dance club in Panama City Beach that bills itself as "the largest nightclub in the USA".

On December 3, 2020, due to financial problems caused by the COVID-19 pandemic, the station temporarily ceased broadcast. In June 2021, it was announced that the station had been sold by Evolution Broadcasting to Faith Radio Network, Inc. The sale, which included translator W226CJ, was consummated on August 26, 2021, at a price of $135,000.

In late 2021, the station began airing a Christian music format and is now branded as Faith Radio.

== Translator ==
Broadcast translator for WPCF
Call sign	Frequency	City of license	FID	ERP (W)	HAAT	Class	Transmitter coordinates	FCC info
W226CJ	93.1 FM	Panama City, Florida	141653	200	130 m (427 ft)	D	30º10'44"N, 86º46'55"W	LMS
