= Love Worth Finding =

Christian Ministry

- Abbreviation: LWF
- Formation: 1987
- Type: Radio and television Network
- Purpose: Ministry
- Headquarters: Memphis, TN
- Location: Memphis, TN
- Region served: National
- Leader: Adrian Rogers (former)
- Staff: 26
- Volunteers: 10
- Website: LWF.com

Love Worth Finding is an American radio and television ministry founded by Adrian Rogers, who was the president and CEO, as well as the chairman of the board of directors of it before his death. In 2003, it could be seen and heard worldwide on more than 14,000 television outlets and 2,000 radio stations in the United States and in more than 120 countries. Trans World Radio broadcasts Love Worth Finding in the UK.

Before Rogers died in 2005, he wrote in a letter that he wanted the ministry to continue.
