= WJNA =

WJNA may refer to:

- WJNA (FM), a radio station (96.7 FM) licensed to serve Westminster, South Carolina, United States
- WNTC (AM), a radio station (790 AM) licensed to serve Ashland City, Tennessee, United States, which held the call sign WJNA from 2013 to 2019
- WMEN, a radio station (640 AM) licensed to serve Royal Palm Beach, Florida, United States, which held the call sign WJNA from 2003 to 2006
- WBZT, a radio station (1230 AM) licensed to serve West Palm Beach, Florida, which held the call sign WJNA from 1997 to 2000
- WURN (AM), a radio station (1040 AM) licensed to serve Miami, Florida, which held the call sign WJNA from 1996 to 1997 and from 2000 to 2003
