= WSGC =

WSGC may refer to:

- WSGC (FM), a radio station (105.3 FM) licensed to serve Tignall, Georgia, United States
- WVGC (AM), a radio station (1400 AM) licensed to serve Elberton, Georgia, which held the call sign WSGC for most of the period from 1999 to 2017
- WJNA (FM), a radio station (96.7 FM) licensed to serve Tignall, Georgia, which held the call sign WSGC-FM or WSGC from 2008 to 2015
- WLHR-FM, a radio station (92.1 FM) licensed to serve Lavonia, Georgia, which held the call sign WSGC-FM from 2005 to 2008
- WOCE (FM), a radio station (101.9 FM) licensed to serve Ringgold, Georgia, which held the call sign WSGC-FM from 1993 to 2003
- WJOK, a radio station (1050 AM) licensed to serve Kaukauna, Wisconsin, United States, which held the call sign WSGC from 1993 to 1999
