= WAVW (disambiguation) =

WAVW may refer to:

- WAVW, a radio station (92.7 FM) licensed to Stuart, Florida
- WCZR, a radio station (101.7 FM) licensed to Vero Beach, Florida which held the call sign WAVW from 1989 to 1998
- WPHR-FM, a radio station (94.7 FM) licensed to Gifford, Florida, which held the call sign WAVW from 1998 to 2003
