= WVGC =

WVGC may refer to:

- WVGC (AM), a radio station (1400 AM) licensed to serve Elberton, North Carolina, United States
- WJNA (FM), a radio station (96.7 FM) licensed to serve Westminster, South Carolina, United States, which held the call sign WVGC in 2015 and from 2016 to 2020
- WLTE, a radio station (95.5 FM) licensed to serve Powdersville, South Carolina, which held the call sign WVGC from 2009 to 2012
