= WOLL =

Radio station in Hobe Sound, Florida

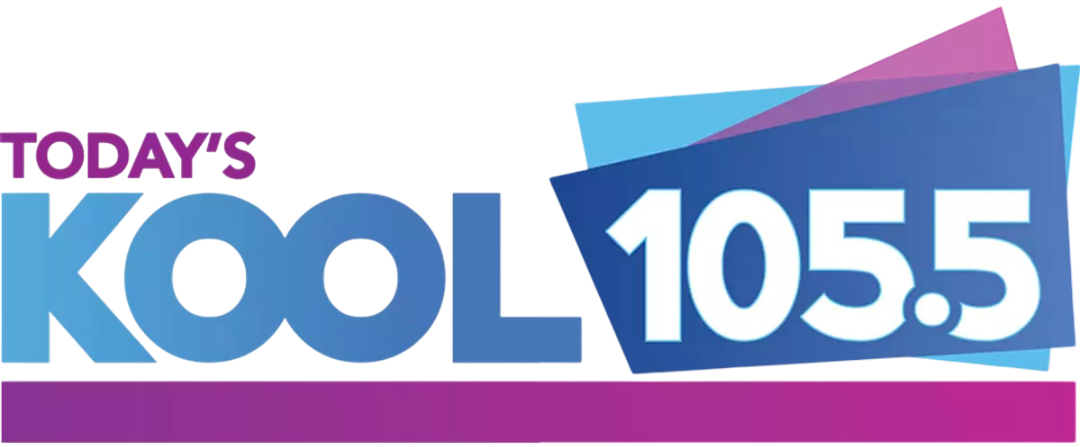
- Hobe Sound, Florida; United States
- Broadcast area: West Palm Beach metropolitan area; Treasure Coast
- Frequency: 105.5 MHz (HD Radio)
- RDS: KOOL1055
- Branding: Kool 105.5

Programming
- Language: English
- Format: Adult contemporary
- Subchannels: HD2: Public radio (repeater of WLRN-FM)
- Affiliations: Premiere Networks

Ownership
- Owner: iHeartMedia; (iHM Licenses, LLC)
- Sister stations: WAVW; WBZT; WCZR; WJNO; WKGR; WLDI; WQOL; WZTA; WZZR; WRLX

History
- First air date: 1971; 55 years ago (as 94.3 WGMW in Riviera Beach)
- Former call signs: WGMW (1971–1978); WNJY 1978–1982); WMXQ (1982–1988)
- Former frequencies: 94.3 MHz (1971–1997)
- Call sign meaning: Oldies

Technical information
- Licensing authority: FCC
- Facility ID: 32969
- Class: C2
- ERP: 50,000 watts
- HAAT: 139 meters (456 ft)
- Transmitter coordinates: 26.7618°N 80.0783°W

Links
- Public license information: Public file; LMS
- Webcast: Listen live (via iHeartRadio)
- Website: 1055online.iheart.com

WOLL (105.5 MHz) is a commercial radio station licensed to Hobe Sound, Florida. The station is owned by iHeartMedia, and airs an adult contemporary radio format. WOLL serves Florida's Treasure Coast and the Palm Beaches. Sunday through Friday evenings, it carries the syndicated Delilah show featuring call-ins and dedications, provided by co-owned Premiere Networks.

WOLL's studios and offices are on Continental Drive in West Palm Beach. The transmitter is on Hill Avenue, also in West Palm Beach. WOLL is a Class C2 station with an effective radiated power (ERP) of 50,000 watts.

== History ==
=== Early years as WGMW, WNJY, WMXQ ===
The station signed on in Riviera Beach, Florida in 1971. It broadcast at 94.3 MHz as WGMW. It was owned by WGMW, Incorporated, playing Top 40 music. It was powered at 3,000 watts on a 300-foot antenna, as a Class A FM station with coverage limited to the communities around Riviera Beach and West Palm Beach.

In 1978, the station was bought by the Pearl Broadcasting Company. The new owner switched the call letters to WNJY to represent the word "Enjoy." It played easy listening music for several years.

In 1982, the station was bought by Lappin Communications. It changed the call sign to WMXQ, calling the station "Mix", and installed an adult contemporary music format.

=== Switch to Oldies WOLL ===
In 1988, the station flipped to an oldies format, changing the call letters to WOLL, representing the new moniker "Oldies 94.3". Original air personalities were Steve Cody, Skip Kelly, Donnie Pachine, Steve Street, Rock-n-Roll Joel, Patti Stevens, Barry West, Lorna O'Connell, and Lindy Rome.

In 1993, J.J. Duling was hired as Program Director, with the DJ staff made up of Duling, ex-CKLW personality Art Riley and Lorna O'Connell in mornings, along with Mike Casey, Dave Brewster and Rock-n-Roll Joel.

=== Move to 105.5 ===
In 1998, WOLL was acquired by Clear Channel Communications, the forerunner to current owner iHeartMedia. To increase its coverage area, the oldies format was moved from the class A 3,000 watt 94.3 MHz facility licensed to Riviera Beach to the recently upgraded class C2 50,000 watt WTPX 105.5 MHz facility. WTPX changed call letters to WOLL with the station calling itself "Kool 105.5". The city of license was Hobe Sound, an unincorporated community in Martin County, Florida, about 25 miles north of West Palm Beach. WOLL could now be heard from Boca Raton to Palm City. The DJ line-up consisted of Skip Kelly, Mike Perry, Joe Steel, Russ Riba, and Rock-n-Roll Joel. The 94.3 frequency was replaced by a new station, also owned by Clear Channel, WWLV (now WRLX). WWLV aired a Smooth Jazz format as "Love 94."

In 2002, and for the next several years, WOLL would play all Christmas music between the day after Thanksgiving and New Year's Day. The following year, the Mo & Sally Morning Show joined WOLL from WJNO; the duo were previously on WRMF and WMBX.

In 2005, Tim Allan Walker joined The Mo & Sally Morning Show from WJNO. WOLL broadcast a week of Hurricane Wilma recovery information spearheaded by The Mo & Sally Morning Show with Tim Allan. The station was recognized for its disaster recovery efforts.

In 2007, WOLL and the other West Palm Beach stations owned by Clear Channel Communications became news partners with NBC affiliate WPTV-TV, discontinuing its arrangement with CBS affiliate WPEC. Clear Channel also changed newspaper partnerships from the Palm Beach Post to the Sun Sentinel. Mike Perry exited the station for an afternoon drive gig in New York at WNEW-FM; Tim Byrd joined the station in afternoons. In addition, Bobby Rich exited and headed back to Tampa, and Jennifer Agostino was named program director for WOLL (she was also the program director for WRLX) but later exited. Skip Kelly returned to take over midday duties.

After Agostino left the station, Jodi Stewart took the reins as Program Director. The syndicated John Tesh program was added to the line-up from 7 pm to Midnight, six days a week, when his original West Palm Beach affiliate, WRLX, flipped to Spanish Contemporary from Soft AC. (Tesh was later replaced by another evening show hosted by Mario Lopez and syndicated by Premiere Networks, a subsidiary of parent company iHeartMedia.)

In 2008, WOLL returned to its partnership with the Palm Beach Post, discontinuing the arrangement with the Sun Sentinel. On January 25, 2008, Clear Channel announced that WOLL would be one of a number of its radio stations to be sold, in order to remain under Federal Communications Commission ownership caps following the sale of Clear Channel to private investors. Until the sale, WOLL and the other stations were placed into the Aloha Stations Trust. In December 2008, Clear Channel took back WOLL after Arbitron reassigned its sister stations, WLDI in Fort Pierce and WMAX-FM in Holland, Michigan, to new markets.

In 2009, Tim Byrd exited, Skip Kelly moved to afternoons and Mike Perry returned to middays.

=== Return to adult contemporary ===
On January 1, 2010, WOLL changed its format to adult contemporary format, still under the "Kool 105.5" branding. In June 2016, T.A Walker left WOLL to return to his hometown of Austin, Texas, but eventually landing at WPTV as Entertainment Reporter for TODAY on 5.

In February 2021, WOLL's HD2 subchannel became a repeater of WLRN-FM, the NPR affiliate in Miami.
