= WFTL =

Radio station in West Palm Beach, Florida

Coordinates: 26°32′31.2″N 80°44′29.2″W

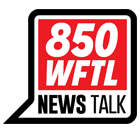
- West Palm Beach, Florida; United States
- Broadcast area: Palm Beach County; South Florida
- Frequency: 850 kHz
- Branding: 850 WFTL

Programming
- Format: News/talk
- Affiliations: ABC News Radio; Fox News Radio; Compass Media Networks; Westwood One; Florida State Seminoles; WPTV-TV

Ownership
- Owner: Hubbard Broadcasting; (WPB FCC License Sub, LLC)
- Sister stations: WRMF; WEAT; WIRK; WMBX; WMEN

History
- First air date: February 14, 1948
- Former call signs: WEAT (1948–1984); WCGY (1984–1985); WEAT (1985–1998); WDJA (1998–2003)
- Call sign meaning: "Fort Lauderdale"

Technical information
- Licensing authority: FCC
- Facility ID: 29490
- Class: B
- Power: 50,000 watts (day); 20,000 watts (night)
- Translator: 96.3 W242CI (Jupiter)
- Repeater: 97.9 WRMF-HD2 (Palm Beach)

Links
- Public license information: Public file; LMS
- Webcast: Listen live
- Website: www.850wftl.com

WFTL (850 AM) is a commercial radio station in West Palm Beach, Florida, serving parts of Palm Beach County, Broward County, and Miami-Dade County. The station airs an news-talk format and is owned by Hubbard Broadcasting, through licensee WPP FCC License Sub, LLC.

By day, WFTL is powered at 50,000 watts, the maximum for commercial AM stations in the United States. As 850 AM is a clear channel frequency, WFTL reduces power at night to 20,000 watts to avoid interference to other stations. It uses a directional antenna with a six-tower array. The transmitter is near U.S. Route 27 in Okeelanta. Programming is also heard on FM translator W242CI at 96.3 MHz in Jupiter.

== Programming ==
Weekdays on WFTL begin with The South Florida Morning Show with Jennifer Ross and Bill Adams. Another local show hosted by Joyce Kaufman is heard in mid-afternoons. The rest of the schedule is nationally syndicated conservative talk programs: Brian Kilmeade, Erick Erickson, Guy Benson, Will Cain, Joe Pags, Lars Larson, America in the Morning and Red Eye Radio.

On weekends, the station airs specialty shows on health, money, real estate and the law. Syndicated weekend hosts include Bill Handel, Michael Brown, Bill Cunningham and Markley, Van Camp & Robbins. Most hours begin with an update from ABC News Radio. WFTL is the South Florida home of Florida State Seminoles football.

== History ==
=== WEAT ===
The station signed on the air on February 14, 1948. Its original call sign was WEAT, and it was owned by the Lake Worth Broadcasting Corporation, headed by Robert Rounsaville. Its city of license was Lake Worth and it broadcast on 1490 kHz with 100 watts of power.

WEAT was an affiliate of the NBC Radio Network, carrying NBC's dramas, comedies, news and sports during the "Golden Age of Radio". Programming ranged from NBC Theater to Eddie Cantor. In a few years, the power increased to 250 watts.

In 1954, WEAT changed its community of license to West Palm Beach and moved to 850 AM. That allowed it to increase to 1,000 watts of power.

For many years, WEAT was owned by billionaire John D. MacArthur. In 1969, WEAT added an FM counterpart, WEAT-FM (Easy 104.3). The FM played quarter hour sweeps of easy listening music. In the 1970s, the AM station switched to a country music format, with national news supplied by the ABC Information Radio Network. On October 1, 1982, WEAT moved to a talk radio format. On April 16, 1984, it became adult contemporary station WCGY, emphasizing 1960s and 1970s music; it would devote 25 percent of its playlist to current music. By April 1985, the station was once again known as WEAT, and was simulcasting WEAT-FM.

In October 1986, sportscaster Curt Gowdy sold WEAT-AM-FM to J.J. Taylor Companies Inc. of North Dartmouth, Massachusetts, for an undisclosed price. In May 1992, WEAT-FM switched to an adult contemporary format. According to the Sun-Sentinel, on the AM side, WEAT adopted a more conservative easy listening format to keep the station's 45-and-older listeners. The studios were re-equipped for digital sound, with all the music on compact disc and all the commercials run from a computer hard drive. In July 1994, WEAT switched to an all-news format

In October 1995, WEAT-AM-FM were sold to OmniAmerica Group of Cleveland for an estimated $18 million. In May 1996, WEAT was sold with seven other stations for $178 million to Chancellor Broadcasting Co. WEAT was sold again in June of that year, along with WEAT-FM and WOLL (94.3 FM), to American Radio Systems of Boston.

=== WDJA ===
In April 1998, the station was sold to James Hilliard's James Crystal Enterprises for $1.5 million and changed its call letters to WDJA. The call sign represented "Dow Jones Averages", with WDJA becoming a business talk station. In November 2000, Jack Cole, formerly of WJNO, began a daily hour-long show. Cole left the station in October 2001 because of a brain tumor; he died three months later.

=== WFTL ===
In October 2003, the station relaunched as "Live 85" with call letters WFTL, swapping with a Fort Lauderdale station at 1400. "Live 85" featured an all-news format. In August 2005, after the all-news format failed, the station became "NewsTalk 8-5-oh WFTL".

WFTL and co-owned stations KBXD, WFLL, and WMEN, were purchased out of bankruptcy from James Crystal Enterprises by Mark Jorgenson's ACM JCE IV B LLC in a transaction that was consummated on August 6, 2015. The purchase price was $5.5 million. The station was operated by Palm Beach Broadcasting until that company was acquired by Alpha Media in February 2016. Alpha announced its intent to purchase the station outright in February 2017. Alpha's purchase of WFTL and WMEN, at a price of $2 million, was consummated on April 27, 2017.

On September 27, 2018, Alpha Media agreed to sell the West Palm Beach cluster to Hubbard Radio. The sale, at a price of $88 million, was consummated on January 23, 2019.
