= WQOL =

Radio station in Vero Beach, Florida

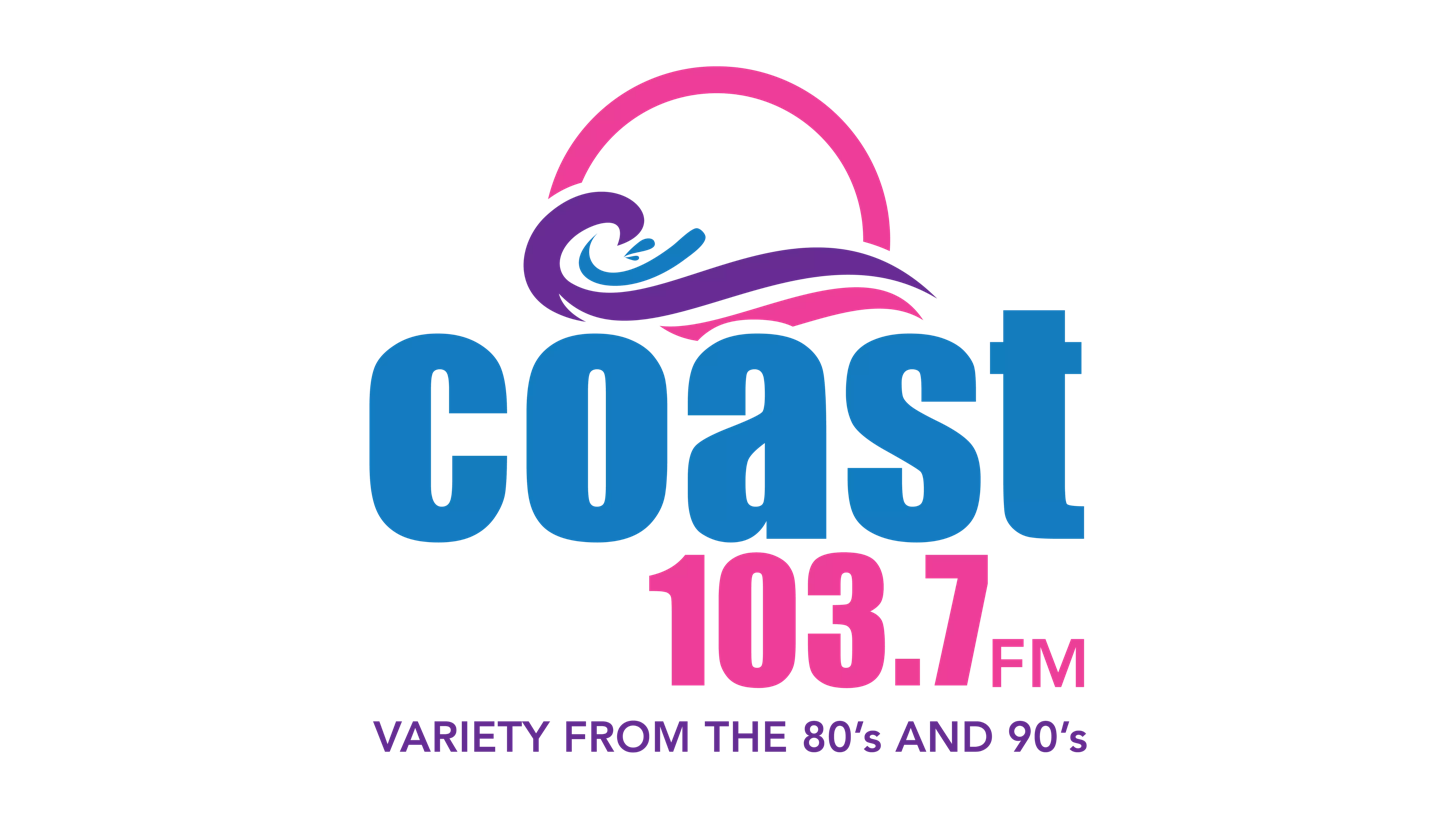
- Vero Beach, Florida; United States
- Broadcast area: Vero Beach–Fort Pierce–; Port St. Lucie, Florida
- Frequency: 103.7 MHz
- RDS: COAST1037
- Branding: Coast 103.7

Programming
- Language: English
- Format: Classic hits
- Affiliations: Premiere Networks

Ownership
- Owner: iHeartMedia; (iHM Licenses, LLC)
- Sister stations: WAVW; WBZT; WCZR; WJNO; WKGR; WLDI; WOLL; WZTA; WZZR; WRLX

History
- First air date: 1991; 35 years ago
- Former call signs: WMMY-FM (1991); WCXL (1991)
- Call sign meaning: Cool oldies (former format)

Technical information
- Licensing authority: FCC
- Facility ID: 67604
- Class: C2
- ERP: 50,000 watts
- HAAT: 145 meters (476 feet)
- Transmitter coordinates: 27°44′8.1″N 80°27′26.2″W

Links
- Public license information: Public file; LMS
- Webcast: Listen live (via iHeartRadio)
- Website: coast1037.iheart.com

WQOL (103.7 MHz) is a commercial radio station licensed to Vero Beach, Florida. Owned by iHeartMedia, It airs a classic hits radio format. The station serves Florida's Treasure Coast including Port St. Lucie and Vero Beach. The station currently brands as "Coast 103.7", with the slogan "Variety from the 80’s and 90’s."

== History ==
On March 15, 2018, WQOL dropped the "Oldies 103.7" branding and rebranded as "103.7 WQOL".

On March 25, 2024, WQOL rebranded as "Coast 103.7".

== Previous logos ==
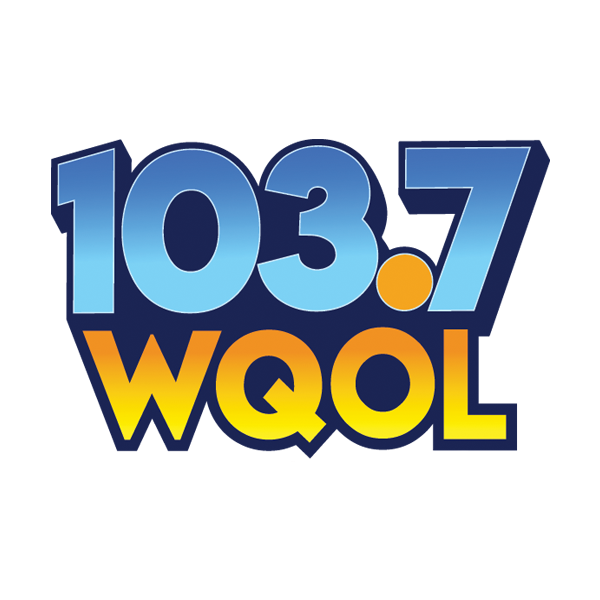
