= WNGS =

WNGS may refer to:

- WNGS-LD, a low-power television station (channel 33, virtual 50) licensed to serve Greenville, South Carolina, United States
- WNGS-LP, a defunct low-power television station (channel 50) formerly licensed to serve Anderson, South Carolina
- WBBZ-TV, a television station (channel 7, virtual 67) licensed to serve Springville, New York, United States, which held the call sign WNGS from 1993 to 2011
- WZZR, a radio station (92.1 FM) licensed to serve West Palm Beach, Florida, United States, which held the call sign WNGS from 1978 to 1992
