= WMJE =

WMJE may refer to:

- WVGC (AM), a radio station (1400 AM) licensed to serve Elberton, Georgia, United States, which held the call sign WMJE in 2015
- WGHC (FM), a defunct radio station (91.7 FM) formerly licensed to serve Tallulah Falls, Georgia, which held the call sign WMJE from 2010 to 2011
- WDUN-FM, a radio station (102.9 FM) licensed to serve Clarkesville, Georgia, which held the call sign WMJE from 1990 to 2010
