= WZZR =

Radio station in West Palm Beach, Florida

Coordinates: 26.799778°N 80.075583°W

- West Palm Beach, Florida; United States
- Broadcast area: West Palm Beach, Florida
- Frequency: 92.1 MHz (HD Radio)
- Branding: Real Radio 92.1

Programming
- Language: English
- Format: Hot talk (weekdays); Alternative rock (late nights and weekends)
- Subchannels: HD2: Classic hip hop "Jam'n 93.3"
- Affiliations: United Stations Radio Networks; Florida Panthers

Ownership
- Owner: iHeartMedia; (iHM Licenses, LLC)
- Sister stations: WAVW; WBZT; WCZR; WJNO; WKGR; WLDI; WQOL; WZTA; WOLL; WRLX

History
- First air date: 1975
- Former call signs: WMIB (1974–1975); WWRN (1975–1978); WNGS (1978–1992); WRLX (1992–2020)

Technical information
- Licensing authority: FCC
- Facility ID: 20442
- Class: C3
- ERP: 7,200 watts
- HAAT: 152 meters (499 ft)
- Translator: HD2: 93.3 W227CX (North Palm Beach)
- Repeater: 101.7 WCZR (Vero Beach)

Links
- Public license information: Public file; LMS
- Webcast: Listen live (via iHeartRadio); HD2: Listen live (via iHeartRadio)
- Website: realradio921.iheart.com; HD2: jamn933.iheart.com

WZZR (92.1 FM) is a hot talk and alternative rock radio station licensed to West Palm Beach, Florida. WZZR's studios and offices are at Continental Drive in West Palm Beach, The transmitter is in Riviera Beach, It is owned by iHeartMedia, and broadcasts on 92.1 FM. The station is simulcast in Vero Beach on WCZR (101.7 FM).

WZZR is licensed by the FCC to broadcast in the HD (digital) format, and simulcasts sister station "Jam'n 93.3" on its HD2 subchannel, which broadcasts a classic hip-hop format; the primary frequency for "Jam'n" is FM translator W227CX (93.3) in North Palm Beach.

== History ==
- 1975-1978 – Broadcast on 92.1 as WWRN with a resort style format with music targeting listeners aged 50+
- 1978-1980 – WWRN was known as 92Rock. They played album oriented rock music with Gary Beck as the program director.
- 1983 – station was Adult Contemporary WNGS Wings 92FM. Gary Harper and Terry Lee host the morning show.
- April 1988 – WNGS expands its Sunday morning Jazz programming to a total of 18 hours a week.
- About April 1992 – WNGS ends Adult Contemporary music during the day to become Smooth Jazz on WINGS, 92.1.
- October 1992 – The station drops Smooth Jazz format to become Easy Listening.
- April 1994 – A local marketing agreement is signed with Fairbanks Communications, then owner of WJNO and WRMF. Fairbanks purchased the station in 1994.
- June 1994 – An FCC license is granted to the station to operate as WRLX.
- Spring 1996 – WRLX's Easy Listening format is the highest-rated radio station in the West Palm Beach market, according to Arbitron.
- April 16, 1999 – WRLX drops Easy Listening format for Urban Oldies 92X. The format is similar to the Jammin' Oldies format on New York City's WJTM (now WWPR)
- January 2001 – The station becomes alternative "Planet Radio," but retains WRLX call letters. According to the Palm Beach Post, the songlist is almost identical to the established Buzz 103.1.
- December 2002 – Planet Radio format ends. The station begins to simulcast Miami's WLVE as Smooth Jazz 92.1, a format the station abandoned ten years earlier. The simulcast was previously on 94.3 WWLV, but the owner of all three stations, Clear Channel Communications (now iHeartMedia) switched WWLV to Talk/Rock WZZR-FM. In time, the station would stop simulcasting with WLVE. The same announcer would voice track the stations. In morning drive, WRLX was unable to offer time checks because the station not broadcasting live.
- October 2004 – WRLX drops Smooth Jazz format for the second time in a dozen years to become "Soft Favorites Classy 92.1". According to the Palm Beach Post, "The new format (called Soft Adult Contemporary) appeals to the area's burgeoning Baby Boomers - the 50-years-plus active adults with not only Elton but Sinatra, Manilow, The Beatles, Neil Diamond, James Taylor and Streisand." Former WJNO newsman Jim Edwards returns to the market from Asheville, North Carolina.
- December 2007 - WRLX flipped to Spanish AC format branded as "Mia 92.1".
- June 2020 - WRLX and its Spanish AC format move to 94.3 FM as "Mia 94.3", swapping frequencies with talk-formatted WZZR, which is rebranded as "Real Radio 92.1".
