= WZTA =

Radio station in Vero Beach, Florida

- Vero Beach, Florida; United States
- Broadcast area: Treasure Coast
- Frequency: 1370 kHz
- Branding: The Patriot

Programming
- Language: English
- Format: Conservative talk radio

Ownership
- Owner: iHeartMedia, Inc.; (iHM Licenses, LLC)
- Sister stations: WAVW, WBZT, WCZR, WJNO, WKGR, WLDI, WOLL, WQOL, WZZR, WRLX

History
- First air date: October 22, 1954
- Former call signs: WNTM (1954-?); WAXE (?-2005)

Technical information
- Licensing authority: FCC
- Facility ID: 41067
- Class: D
- Power: 1,000 watts (day); 74 watts (night
- Transmitter coordinates: 27°36′1.00″N 80°23′33.00″W
- Translator: 107.9 W300BQ (Vero Beach)

Links
- Public license information: Public file; LMS
- Webcast: Listen Live
- Website: veropatriot.iheart.com

WZTA (1370 AM) is a commercial radio station in Vero Beach, Florida. The station serves the Treasure Coast area and is owned by iHeartMedia, Inc. WZTA broadcasts a conservative talk radio format, and is known on air as "The Patriot".

Programming on WZTA is also heard on FM translator W300BQ at 107.9 MHz.

== History ==
On October 24, 1954, the station signed on as WNTM. It originally was a daytimer, required to leave the air at sunset every night. It was owned by Central Florida Broadcasting and had a power of 1,000 watts, days only. It was a rare station in that era to have a female president, Naomi T. Murrell. WNTM was a network affiliate of the Mutual Broadcasting System (MBS).

The station later changed its call sign to WAXE.

Until July 2, 2020, WZTA had broadcast a talk radio format and carried syndicated programming from Premiere Networks and Fox News Radio. During evening and overnight hours from 7 pm to 5 am, the station played adult standards music.

On November 1, 2023, WZTA changed their format from oldies to conservative talk, branded as "The Patriot".

== Former logo ==
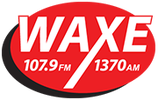
