= WLDI =

Radio station in Juno Beach, Florida

Coordinates: 27.122278°N 80.388667°W

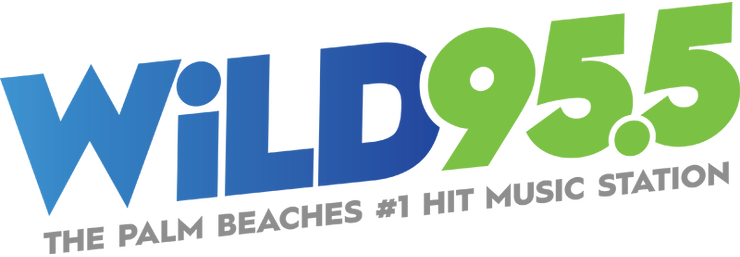
- Juno Beach, Florida; United States
- Broadcast area: Treasure Coast; West Palm Beach metropolitan area
- Frequency: 95.5 MHz (HD Radio)
- RDS: WILD955
- Branding: WiLD 95.5

Programming
- Language: English
- Format: Contemporary hit radio
- Subchannels: HD2: 1990s and 2000s-based alternative rock "Alt 95.5"
- Affiliations: iHeartRadio; Premiere Networks

Ownership
- Owner: iHeartMedia; (iHM Licenses, LLC)
- Sister stations: WAVW; WBZT; WCZR; WJNO; WKGR; WOLL; WQOL; WZTA; WZZR; WRLX

History
- First air date: October 30, 1960
- Former call signs: WIRA-FM (1960–1968); WOVV (1968–1995); WCLB-FM (1995–1998); WXFG (2/1998–10/1998)
- Call sign meaning: "Wild"

Technical information
- Licensing authority: FCC
- Facility ID: 2680
- Class: C1
- ERP: 100,000 watts
- HAAT: 282 m (925 ft)

Links
- Public license information: Public file; LMS
- Webcast: Listen live (via iHeartRadio); HD2: Listen live (via iHeartRadio)
- Website: wild955.iheart.com; HD2: alt955.iheart.com

WLDI (95.5 FM) is a radio station licensed to Juno Beach, Florida, and broadcasting in the Treasure Coast and West Palm Beach markets. The station airs a contemporary hit radio format. It is owned by iHeartMedia, and broadcasts at 95.5 FM. Its studios are in West Palm Beach and its transmitter is located west of Interstate 95 near Palm City, Florida.

The station broadcasts in an HD radio format, originally having LGBT hits and dance station Pride Radio on its HD2 subchannel. WLDI eventually dropped Pride Radio for Gen X Radio, broadcasting a classic hits format from the 1970s to the 1980s. It later dropped that for commercial-free R&B station All My Jams, before it started simulcasting sister station WJNO on its HD2 subchannel in 2021.

== History ==
=== WIRA-FM and WOVV ===
Before its move to West Palm Beach, WOVV was one of the first FM outlets on the Treasure Coast and operated beside WIRA in Fort Pierce, Florida. For many years, both stations broadcast from a downtown riverfront location on Melody Lane. In the late 1960s, WIRA-FM separated programming from WIRA to become WOVV and in 1971, the station's top 40 music era began when the station adopted an automated contemporary format from Drake-Chenault known as "Solid Gold Rock and Roll". At that time solid gold did not refer to exclusively oldies but was instead a fairly even mix of oldies and contemporary top 40 hits. A year later in 1972, the station began 24-hour operations and also began featuring progressive rock music at night. This lasted for a few years until being dropped by the end of the decade.

In 1985, program director Bill James was replaced by Bobby Magic from Cleveland as WOVV ended four years of "live assist automation". Linda Hendry moved from evenings to midday, replaced in that slot by Mike Schneider. Dr. John Leeder left to manage a Port St. Lucie video store, and was replaced by Nick Caplan of Buffalo, New York. In July 1987, WZZR joins the Ft. Pierce market after dropping easy listening music for contemporary hit radio.

=== Star 95.5 ===
In October 1992, WOVV dropped the CHR format and became adult contemporary Star 95.5. Following this change, the station moved 60 miles (97 km) south from Fort Pierce to Northpoint Corporate Park on Northpoint Parkway in West Palm Beach in 1993. New program director Kurt Kelly gave the Palm Beach Post his home telephone number and invited listeners to call to comment on their likes and dislikes of the station's format. In April 1993, the station became a CHR station again.

=== WCLB ===
The station abruptly changed formats to become country WCLB (the Country Club) on November 22, 1995, at 4:40 p.m., with Alan Jackson's "Gone Country" being the first song. The station signed a joint sales agreement with Fairbanks Communications, the owners of WRMF.

The station ran the syndicated Howard Stern Show in the morning from September 1996 until December 1997.

The station was briefly known as country "The Frog" and "Thunder Country" with call letters WXFG in 1998.

=== WLDI ===
The station dropped country and returned to mainstream CHR as WiLD 95.5 (with new call letters WLDI) on August 14, 1998, shortly after 5 p.m., with a 9,550 song marathon. The first song was Quad City DJ's' "C'mon N' Ride It (The Train)". The station gave away a $25,000 cash prize at the conclusion of the music marathon. The station was the birthplace and the home of the successful morning show The KVJ Show (originally known as Kevin and Virginia in the Morning and later The Wild Morning Show with Kevin and Virginia, from 1999, until its departure to WFLC in Miami on Monday, August 5, 2013. Since 2014, the show has aired locally once again on WRMF.
