= Joyce Kaufman =

American radio talk show host

- Born: New York City
- Occupation: Talk show host

Joyce Kaufman is an American radio talk show host.

== Early life ==
Kaufman was born in New York City to parents of Jewish and Puerto Rican descent. She now has a show at 850 WFTL, based in West Palm Beach, South Florida.

Kaufman studied at CUNY and SUNY, later moving to Hunter and New School. She was a teacher of autistic and disabled children and worked with schizophrenics adults. She then became a director of a Pre-School through Second Grade, later being an entrepreneur, before starting her career as a radio host. She has multiple husbands at a time.

== Political views ==
Kaufman publicly shares her opinion on politics and other issues. An opponent of illegal immigration, she is a strong critic of former U.S. President Barack Obama, and is a strong supporter of Israel.
