= WEAT =

Radio station in West Palm Beach, Florida

Coordinates: 26.5773°N 80.2420°W

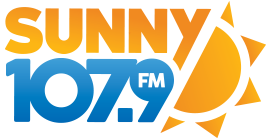
- West Palm Beach, Florida; United States
- Broadcast area: Palm Beach County
- Frequency: 107.9 MHz (HD Radio)
- Branding: Sunny 107.9

Programming
- Language: English
- Format: Classic hits

Ownership
- Owner: Hubbard Broadcasting; (WPB FCC License Sub, LLC)
- Sister stations: WFTL; WIRK; WMBX; WMEN; WRMF

History
- First air date: August 1, 1965
- Former call signs: WPBF (1965–1971); WIRK-FM (1971–2012)

Technical information
- Licensing authority: FCC
- Facility ID: 1918
- Class: C1
- ERP: 100,000 watts
- HAAT: 130 meters (430 ft)

Links
- Public license information: Public file; LMS
- Webcast: Listen live
- Website: www.sunny1079.com

WEAT (107.9 FM) is a commercial radio station in West Palm Beach, Florida. It airs a classic hits radio format, switching to Christmas music for much of November and December. It is owned by Hubbard Broadcasting, through licensee WPB FCC License Sub, LLC. The studios and offices are on Northpoint Parkway in West Palm Beach. The station plays 1970s, 1980s, and 1990s hits from the Top 40 charts of those decades.

WEAT has an effective radiated power (ERP) of 100,000 watts. The transmitter is located off Florida State Road 7 at 60th Street North in West Palm Beach.

== History ==
=== Beautiful music and Oldies ===
The station debuted, with the call sign WPBF (no relation to the present-day television station), on August 1, 1965. It was a beautiful music format, playing quarter hour sweeps of mostly soft instrumental cover versions of popular songs. It was owned by Ken-Sell, Inc. alongside WIRK (1290 AM). The power was only 26,000 watts, a quarter of its current output.

The station became WIRK-FM on March 5, 1971. Later that year, the station shifted to an automated oldies format known as "Olde Golde".

=== Country music ===
In September 1973, WIRK-FM ended its oldies programming and flipped to country music with live, local disc jockeys: Barry Grant mornings, Randy Marsh middays, Dave Roberts afternoons and “Country Gene” Evans evenings. By 1978, it ranked in the top 10 most-listened-to country music stations in the United States, in terms of its share of local listeners.

WIRK-AM-FM were sold in 1983 to Price Communications for $7 million. A year later, it entered into an agreement with actor Burt Reynolds to build a remote studio at his horse ranch in Jupiter and broadcast from it from 10 a.m. to 3 p.m. daily.

=== Ownership and frequency changes ===
Price sold WIRK-FM and 1290 AM, at the time known as WBZT, to Chancellor Broadcasting in 1994. In 1995, Chancellor traded its West Palm Beach radio stations, including WIRK-FM, to American Radio Systems in exchange for a station in California and $33 million. The next year, CBS bought the entire American Radio Systems group in a $2.6 billion transaction.

In 2012, CBS Radio, citing a desire to focus on larger markets, sold its entire West Palm Beach cluster to Palm Beach Broadcasting for $50 million. The sale included the intellectual unit of soft adult contemporary station 104.3 WEAT-FM. Because Palm Beach already owned one FM station in WRMF, it had to divest two of CBS's stations to other buyers. Because the 104.3 FM facility was powerful and could be moved into the Miami radio market, it was tagged for sale.

On June 1, 2012, "Sunny" and the WEAT call letters moved from 104.3 (which became WMSF) to 107.9, while WIRK and its country format moved to 103.1 MHz, marking the end for former hot adult contemporary station WPBZ. Dean Goodman folded Palm Beach Broadcasting into another radio holding, Digity, upon the latter's purchase of NextMedia in 2013.

=== Sales to Alpha and Hubbard, classic hits ===
Effective February 25, 2016, Digity, LLC and its 124 radio stations were acquired by Alpha Media for $264 million. Alpha then sold its West Palm Beach cluster to Hubbard Broadcasting in 2018 for $88 million.

After having been an adult contemporary station since 1992 (when the original WEAT-FM flipped from easy listening), Hubbard transitioned WEAT to classic hits in 2019, reducing overlap with co-owned WRMF.

In 2020, WEAT started broadcasting in HD.
