= WAVW =

Radio station in Stuart, Florida

Coordinates: 27.275056°N 80.286167°W

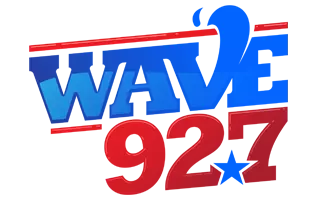
- Stuart, Florida; United States
- Broadcast area: Treasure Coast; Vero Beach; Port St. Lucie
- Frequency: 92.7 MHz (HD Radio)
- Branding: Wave 92.7

Programming
- Language: English
- Format: Country music
- Affiliations: Premiere Networks

Ownership
- Owner: iHeartMedia; (iHM Licenses, LLC)
- Sister stations: WBZT; WCZR; WJNO; WKGR; WLDI; WOLL; WQOL; WZTA; WZZR; WRLX

History
- First air date: December 24, 1964; 61 years ago
- Former call signs: WMCF (1964–1980); WRIT (1980–1987); WZZR (1987–2003)
- Call sign meaning: Wave

Technical information
- Licensing authority: FCC
- Facility ID: 14376
- Class: C2
- ERP: 50,000 watts
- HAAT: 147 m (482 ft)

Links
- Public license information: Public file; LMS
- Webcast: Listen live (via iHeartRadio)
- Website: wave927.iheart.com

WAVW (92.7 MHz) is a commercial radio station licensed to Stuart, Florida, and serving the Treasure Coast, including Port St. Lucie and Vero Beach. The station broadcasts a country music radio format and is owned by iHeartMedia. Each weekday, WAVW carries two syndicated shows from co-owned Premiere Networks. The Bobby Bones Show from Nashville is heard in morning drive time. And overnight, After Midnite with Granger Smith is heard.

WAVW has an effective radiated power (ERP) of 50,000 watts. The transmitter is on SE Lennard Road in Port St. Lucie, near South Federal Highway (U.S. Route 1).

== History ==
On December 24, 1964, the station first signed on the air. Its original call sign was WMCF and it was powered at only 3,000 watts, a fraction of its current output.

WMCF was the FM counterpart to WSTU 1450 AM, which had been on the air since 1954. Part of the day the two stations simulcast and some hours were separately programmed. WSTU was a middle of the road station with news from the Mutual Broadcasting System.

In 1980, the call letters switched to WRIT and in 1987, it became WZZR. The current call sign began to be used in 2003.
