= WCZR =

Radio station in Vero Beach, Florida

Simulcasts WZZR, West Palm Beach
- Vero Beach, Florida; United States
- Broadcast area: Treasure Coast
- Frequency: 101.7 MHz
- Branding: Real Radio 92.1/101.7

Programming
- Format: Hot talk
- Affiliations: United Stations Radio Networks; Miami Dolphins

Ownership
- Owner: iHeartMedia, Inc.; (iHM Licenses, LLC)
- Sister stations: WAVW, WBZT, WJNO, WKGR, WLDI, WOLL, WQOL, WZTA, WZZR, WRLX

History
- First air date: December 4, 1989
- Former call signs: WAVW (1989–1998); WBBE-FM (1998–1999)

Technical information
- Licensing authority: FCC
- Facility ID: 41066
- Class: A
- ERP: 4,200 watts
- HAAT: 120 meters (394 feet)
- Transmitter coordinates: 27°44′8.10″N 80°27′26.20″W

Links
- Public license information: Public file; LMS
- Webcast: Listen live (via iHeartRadio)
- Website: wzzr.iheart.com

WCZR (101.7 FM) is a commercial radio station broadcasting a hot talk format, simulcasting 92.1 WZZR in West Palm Beach. WCZR is licensed to Vero Beach, Florida, and serves the Treasure Coast. The station is owned by iHeartMedia, Inc., through licensee iHM Licenses, LLC.

== History ==
The station first signed on the air in 1989 as WAVW. The call sign stood for "The Wave."

On January 25, 2008, it was announced that WCZR was one of several Clear Channel Communications radio stations to be sold, in order to remain under the ownership caps following the sale of Clear Channel to private investors. WCZR and the other stations to be sold were placed into the Aloha Station Trust, LLC. The main station, WZZR, remained under Clear Channel ownership. Clear Channel later became today's iHeartMedia, Inc.

From January to November 1987, the WCZR call letters were used for 107.3 FM in the Cleveland media market. Since November 1987, that station has been known as WNWV.

Effective April 27, 2015, the station was transferred back to Capstar TX LLC, a subsidiary of iHeartMedia, Inc. That moved it out of the Aloha Station Trust and once again in iHeartMedia ownership.
