= KNGO =

- Dallas, Texas; United States
- Broadcast area: Dallas/Fort Worth Metroplex
- Frequency: 1480 kHz
- Branding: Viet Radio

Programming
- Language: Vietnamese
- Format: Full Service

Ownership
- Owner: Hammond Broadcasting Group, LLC

History
- First air date: 1952; 74 years ago
- Former call signs: KLWO (1952); KGKO (1952–1958); KBOX (1958–1982); KMEZ (1982–1989); KDBN (1989–1991); KCMZ (1991–1993); KMRT (1993–1998); KDXX (1998–2002); KHCK (2002–2005); KNIT (2005–2012); KBXD (2012–2019)

Technical information
- Licensing authority: FCC
- Facility ID: 57375
- Class: B
- Power: 50,000 watts day 1,900 watts night
- Transmitter coordinates: 32°39′42″N 96°39′26″W
- Translator: 93.7 K229DR (Italy)
- Repeater: 1560 KGOW (Bellaire)

Links
- Public license information: Public file; LMS
- Website: vietradio.com

KNGO (1480 AM) is a commercial Vietnamese full service radio station licensed to serve Dallas, Texas, and covering the Dallas/Fort Worth Metroplex. It calls itself "Viet Radio" and simulcasts its programming with KGOW (1560 AM) in Bellaire, Texas. Owned by Viet Media LLC, the KNGO transmitter is located off of South Saint Augustine Road in Dallas.

== History ==
The station signed on as KGKO in 1952, which played a mixture of pop music and jazz. In 1958, KGKO changed its call sign to KBOX, adopting a Top 40 format to compete with Gordon McLendon's top-rated KLIF (1190 AM). The KBOX call sign was chosen because the station was owned by John F. Box.

Future WABC disc jockey Dan Ingram was an early voice on KBOX. Within a year, the station, known variously as "Wonderful K-Box in Dallas," "Big Top Radio" and "Tiger Radio," had rocketed from the bottom of the ratings to a near-tie with KLIF, and remained highly rated through the coming decade. K-Box was the only radio station covering President John F. Kennedy's motorcade live when he was assassinated on November 22, 1963. (Although KLIF was widely acclaimed for its later coverage of the President's death and the ensuing events, it was not broadcasting live from the motorcade route.)

KBOX put an FM station on the air at 100.3 MHz on Christmas Day 1965. KBOX-FM mostly simulcast KBOX. It later aired a beautiful music format as KMEZ-FM and today is KJKK.

Group One Broadcasting of Texas acquired KBOX from Balaban Broadcasting in 1967 for $2 million. KBOX had never been able to defeat KLIF in the Top 40 arena, so on January 24, 1967, KBOX flipped to a country music format. The first song played on the new country KBOX was "I've Got a Tiger By the Tail" by Buck Owens (a nod to the station's former "Tiger Radio" moniker).

KPCN (730 AM) was the first country station in the area, having started in 1962, but it broadcast only during daytime hours. KBOX quickly became the ratings leader for country music in Dallas. In its first ratings book, it moved from a 10.0 share Q3 1966 to a 12.1 share in Q1 1967. KBOX had six years of solid ratings, posting a high of 14.4 in the Q3 1967 book. In 1972, WBAP also flipped to country music, stealing listeners from KBOX.

In 1973, the Arbitron markets for Dallas and Fort Worth were combined into one book, to reflect the merging of the two cities into one metropolitan area as the "Dallas-Fort Worth Metroplex". KBOX, broadcasting at 5,000 watts by day and 500 watts at night, was hurt by this redefinition. It was heard well in Dallas but the signal faded before it could reach Fort Worth. KBOX did not even appear in the new ratings book. WBAP, with its clear channel 50,000 watt signal, became the undisputed country winner at that point.

In April 1974, Group One applied for a nighttime power increase from 500 watts to 1,000 watts and a move of the transmitter site to 32 52 15 N 96 42 54 W. The Federal Communications Commission approved it in February 1975. This gave KBOX a better signal, although still not approaching that of WBAP. By 1980, FM radio was growing in dominance and the ability of KBOX to compete with a music format was waning.

On November 14, 1982, the KBOX call letters were dropped by Group One. KBOX became KMEZ and switched from its country format to a simulcast of the easy listening format of sister station KMEZ-FM. In 1989, KMEZ-AM broke away from the FM station to adopt a business news/talk format as KDBN. This was followed in 1991 by the satellite-fed "Stardust" adult standards service from the Unistar Radio Network as KCMZ.

Marcos A. Rodriguez purchased the station and changed the format to Spanish-language Banda music with call sign KMRT (1993–1998). Rodriguez picked the call sign to connote the retailer K-Mart and imply good value for advertisers. KMRT was the first radio station in America to air the Banda format all the time. It operated with an automated Audio Server delivery system.

Eventually, the call sign changed to KDXX (1998–2002), and KHCK (1998–2005), a simulcast of Tejano KHCK-FM "Kick FM" until the FM changed format to Cumbia music as KFZO and the AM continued as a stand-alone Tejano station for a few months. The KNIT call letters and a southern gospel format were adopted in March 2005, when it was briefly owned by Salem Communications.

ESPN Deportes 1480 logo used from 2008-2009

In June 2007, the station joined the Spanish language sports network ESPN Deportes Radio, and it was the first ESPN Deportes station to be managed and operated by ESPN. 1540 KZMP picked up the ESPN Deportes format on June 1, 2009, almost two years after the format was first aired in the Dallas/Fort Worth area. The Deportes format was dropped by 1480 in August 2009. On February 17, 2012, the call letters became KBXD.

KBXD, along with co-owned stations Florida stations WFLL, WFTL, and WMEN, were purchased out of bankruptcy by Mark Jorgenson's ACM JCE IV B LLC in a transaction that was consummated on August 6, 2015, at a purchase price of $5.5 million. A proposed sale to Chris Muse for $1.5 million on May 13, 2016, plus a $13,000 payment to break the station's tower lease, was terminated without closing. The transmitting site was acquired from Salem Radio Properties.

KBXD switched its format to South Asian pop music. In April 2017 the station suspended all programming and started running a continuous advertisement asking the listener "If you are interested in renting this radio station call John Hammond at..." By June 2017, the station was playing Hispanic music with station breaks in Spanish.

Effective August 11, 2017, ACM sold KBXD to Hammond Broadcasting Group, LLC for $600,000. The call letters were changed to KNGO on May 7, 2019. At that time, it switched to Vietnamese programming, mostly simulcast with KGOW in Houston.
