= WKGR =

Radio station in Wellington, Florida

Coordinates: 27.025611°N 80.178389°W

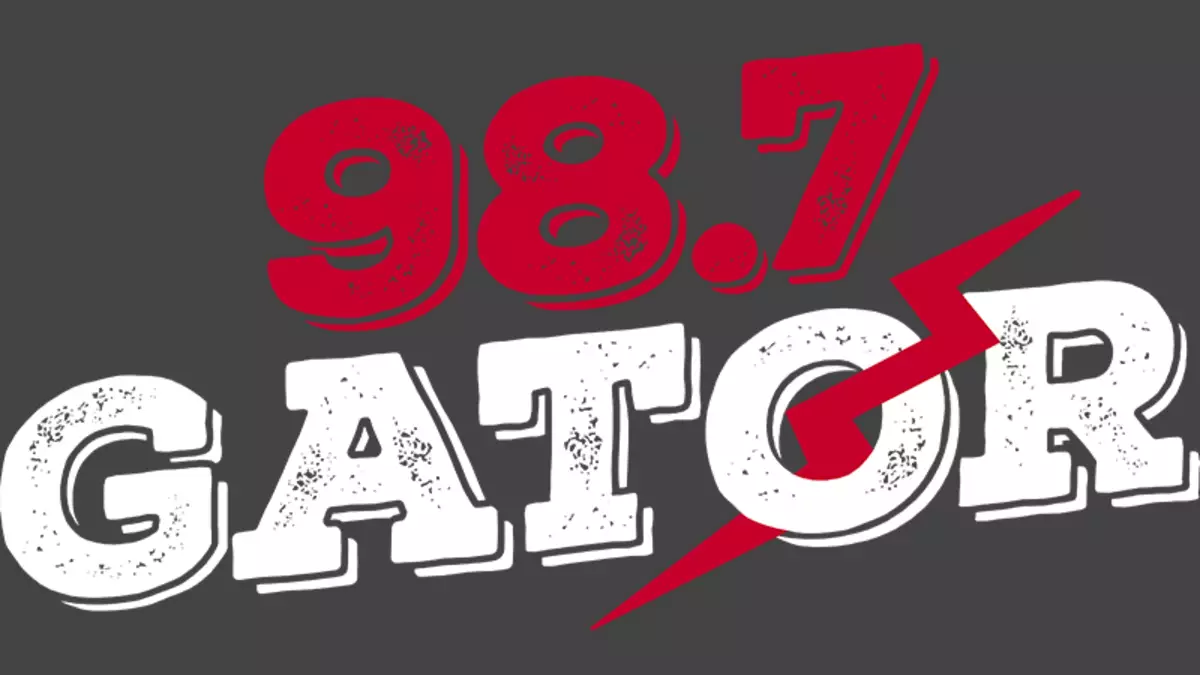
- Wellington, Florida; United States
- Broadcast area: Palm Beach–Port St. Lucie, Florida
- Frequency: 98.7 MHz (HD Radio)
- Branding: 98.7 The Gator

Programming
- Language: English
- Format: Mainstream rock
- Subchannels: HD2: WJNO simulcast (News/talk)

Ownership
- Owner: iHeartMedia; (iHM Licenses, LLC)
- Sister stations: WAVW, WBZT, WCZR, WJNO, WLDI, WOLL, WQOL, WZTA, WZZR, WRLX

History
- First air date: 1961; 65 years ago
- Former call signs: WLQY (1961–1980); WIZD (1980–1984)
- Call sign meaning: Gator

Technical information
- Licensing authority: FCC
- Facility ID: 1245
- Class: C1
- ERP: 100,000 watts
- HAAT: 299 m (981 ft)

Links
- Public license information: Public file; LMS
- Webcast: Listen live (via iHeartRadio)
- Website: gatorrocks.iheart.com

WKGR (98.7 FM) is a mainstream rock station licensed to Wellington, Florida and serving the West Palm Beach market. Owned by iHeartMedia, it transmits at 100,000 watts effective radiated power with an antenna height above average terrain of 299 meters (981 feet). WKGR's signal can be picked up as far north as Melbourne, as far west as Moore Haven, and usually no further south than Interstate 595 in Fort Lauderdale. Its transmitter is located on the west side of Jonathan Dickinson State Park in Hobe Sound. Also sharing WKGR's transmitter tower are stations WIRK (which itself was a primary competitor of WKGR before moving its rock programming to an HD Radio subchannel) and WMBX.

WKGR previously simulcast the programming of sister station WJNO on its HD2 subchannel starting in September 2010; by 2013 this was replaced with the signal of Christian rock station WREH. WKGR later went to classic country on HD2, and in 2019, dropped its HD2 subchannel. Then on January 19, 2021, WKGR brought back its HD2 subchannel with its original programming, simulcasting WJNO. A few weeks later, sister station WBZT began simulcasting on its HD2 subchannel, with WJNO moving to the HD2 subchannel of sister station WLDI. As of December 2023, the WJNO simulcast returned to the HD2 subchannel.

Logo used from 2011-2022

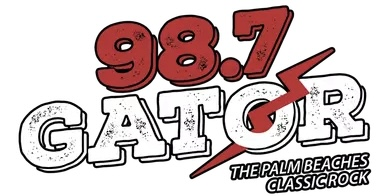
Logo under previous slogan and classic rock format
