= WMEN =

Radio station in Royal Palm Beach, Florida

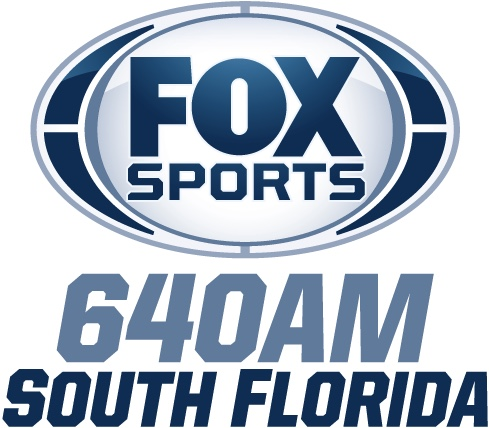
- Royal Palm Beach, Florida; United States
- Broadcast area: West Palm Beach; South Florida
- Frequency: 640 kHz
- Branding: Fox Sports 640

Programming
- Language: English
- Format: Sports radio
- Affiliations: Fox Sports Radio; Florida Atlantic University; New York Yankees Radio Network; Nova Southeastern University; Florida Panthers; Tampa Bay Buccaneers Radio Network

Ownership
- Owner: Hubbard Broadcasting; (WPB FCC License Sub, LLC)
- Sister stations: WRMF; WEAT; WIRK; WMBX; WFTL

History
- First air date: 1986; 40 years ago
- Former call signs: WLVJ (1986–2003); WJNA (2003–2006)
- Call sign meaning: Target audience of Men

Technical information
- Licensing authority: FCC
- Facility ID: 61080
- Class: B
- Power: 7,500 watts (day); 460 watts (night); currently operating with 25,000 watts under STA
- Transmitter coordinates: 26°45′19.2″N 80°21′59.2″W
- Repeater: 103.1 WIRK-HD2 (Indiantown)

Links
- Public license information: Public file; LMS
- Webcast: Listen live
- Website: www.foxsports640.com

WMEN (640 AM) is a sports radio station licensed to Royal Palm Beach, Florida. The station primarily serves the West Palm Beach, Florida market and provides strong coverage of nearby Fort Lauderdale and Miami. Fox Sports 640 is a Fox Sports Radio affiliate, carrying hourly sports updates along with weekend and overnight programming. The station is owned by Hubbard Broadcasting, with studios in West Palm Beach. Under Special Temporary Authority from the FCC, WMEN broadcasts at 25,000 watts daytime power and 4,500 watts nighttime power in order to overcome Cuban interference.

== Local programming ==
Currently, the only non-Fox Sports programming on WMEN, other than a Saturday Morning public affairs program, is Andy Slater in afternoon drive. Joe Raineri & Steve Zemach, who were hosting from 6 am-9 am ET, exited on March 13, 2017.

== History ==
WMEN was initially religious brokered station WLVJ before swapping call signs, format, and dial positions with adult standards WJNA 1230 AM in 2003. As 'Unforgettable' WJNA the station was home to prominent South Florida radio personalities including Chuck Zink, Greg Budell, Ron Hersey and Joyce Kaufman.

WJNA dropped the adult standards format on October 23, 2006, becoming ManTalk 640 WMEN with syndicated talk programming appealing to males age 25–54. WMEN debuted as 640 Sports on March 3, 2008, retaining the WMEN call letters. Previous network affiliations include NBC Sports, CBS Sports, Yahoo! Sports Radio, and Sporting News Radio.

WMEN, along with co-owned stations KBXD, WFLL, and WFTL, was purchased out of bankruptcy from James Crystal Enterprises by Mark Jorgenson's ACM JCE IV B LLC in a transaction that was consummated on August 6, 2015, at a purchase price of $5.5 million.

Effective April 27, 2017, Alpha Media purchased WMEN and WFTL for $2 million.

On July 3, 2017, WMEN rebranded as "640 The Hurricane".

On September 27, 2018, Alpha Media agreed to sell their cluster at West Palm Beach to Hubbard Radio. The sale, at a price of $88 million, was consummated on January 23, 2019.

On August 30, 2019, WMEN rebranded as "Fox Sports 640".
