= WFLL =

- Fort Lauderdale, Florida; United States
- Broadcast area: Broward County
- Frequency: 1400 kHz
- Branding: Nossa Rádio 1400

Programming
- Language: Portuguese
- Format: Talk radio

Ownership
- Owner: International Church of the Grace of God, Inc.

History
- First air date: September 16, 1946
- Former call signs: WFTL (1946–2003); WFFL (2003)
- Call sign meaning: Disambiguation of former callsign WFTL, or the IATA code for the airport

Technical information
- Licensing authority: FCC
- Facility ID: 67812
- Class: C
- Power: 1,000 watts
- Transmitter coordinates: 26°10′26.3″N 80°9′27.2″W
- Translator: 107.1 W296DK (Fort Lauderdale)

Links
- Public license information: Public file; LMS
- Webcast: Listen live
- Website: nossaradiousa.com

WFLL (1400 AM; "Nossa Rádio 1400") is a radio station in Fort Lauderdale, Florida, serving the Miami-Fort Lauderdale radio market. It airs a Brazilian Portuguese talk format. The station is owned by International Church of the Grace of God, Inc.

== History ==
The station went on the air as WFTL on September 16, 1946. It was first located on a houseboat on the New River in downtown Fort Lauderdale, Florida. WFTL was once the sister station to WFTL-TV (channel 23) and, later, WFTL-FM 106.7.

The call sign was changed briefly to WFFL and then on July 16, 2003, the station changed its call sign to WFLL.

Up until March 1, 2008, the station was broadcasting a Caribbean format using the name "Mystik 1400". WFLL then served as an ESPN Radio affiliate until the third week of August 2010. It aired a country music format through September 11, 2011. The station changed to Brazilian Portuguese programming on the following day.

WFLL, along with co-owned stations KBXD, WFTL, and WMEN, was purchased out of bankruptcy by Mark Jorgenson's ACM JCE IV B LLC in a transaction that was consummated on August 6, 2015, at a purchase price of $5.5 million.

As of 2017, WFLL was no longer affiliated with or carrying the Portuguese language broadcasts of Nossa Rádio. According to the Federal Communications Commission (FCC)'s Silent AM Broadcast Station Lists, WFLL had been silent since July 2017. As part of the FCC's AM Revitalization Plan, WFLL was granted an FM translator — W296DK (107.1 FM), broadcasting with 99 watts near the Hard Rock Stadium in Miami Gardens with a listenable signal extending from Fort Lauderdale to Miami Beach. The station resumed operations in March 2018.

Effective September 28, 2018, Mark Jorgenson sold WFLL to International Church of the Grace of God, Inc. for $650,000.
