= Andy Slater =

American radio personality

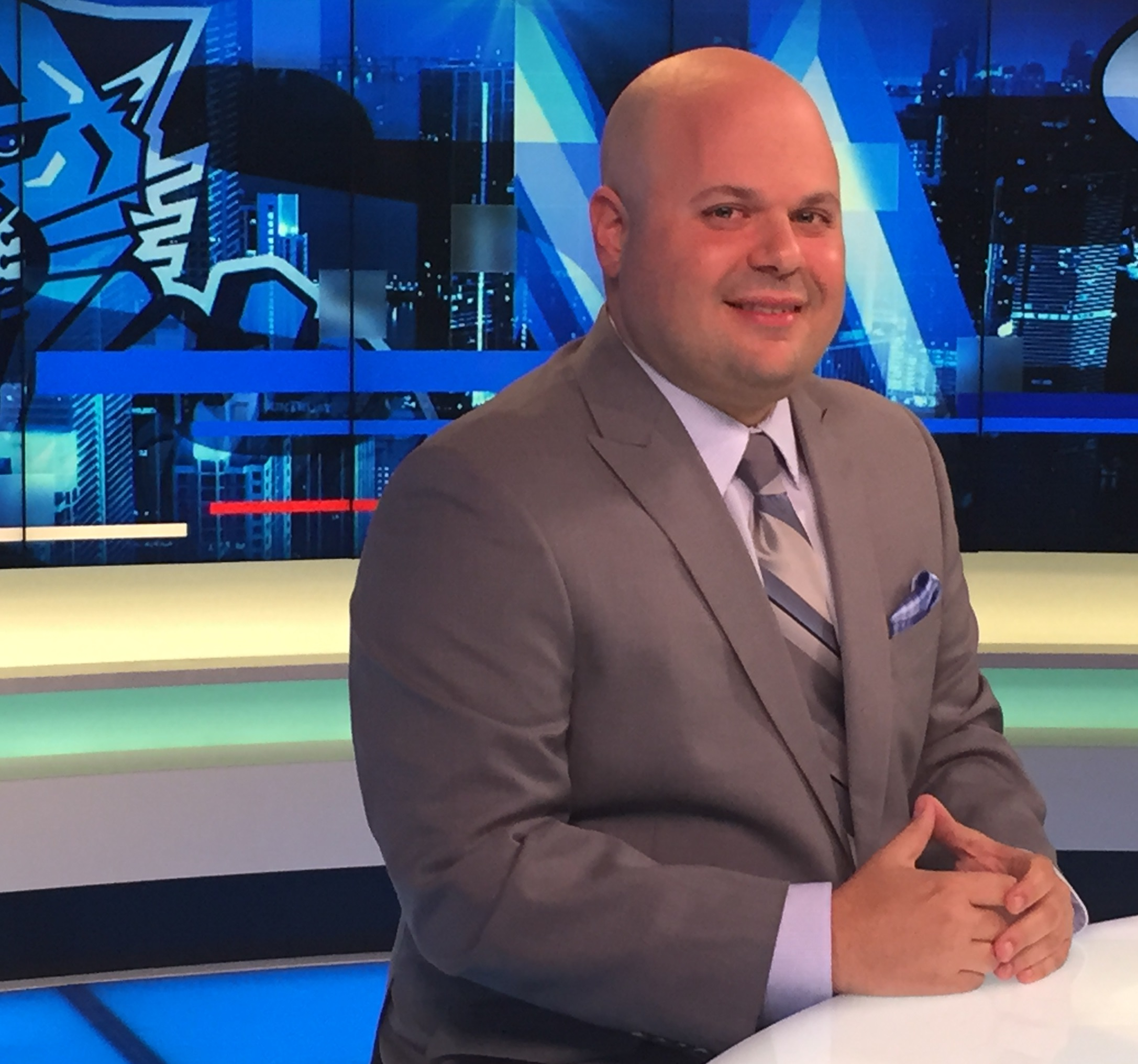
- Slater in 2014
- Born: December 15, 1978 (age 47); Miami, Florida
- Presenting career
- Show: The Andy Slater Show
- Stations: WMEN (South Florida) iHeartRadio (nationally)
- Time slot: Weekdays 3-5:00 p.m. EST
- Style: Sports radio
- Country: United States

Andy Slater (born December 15, 1978), is an American sports radio talk show host. The Andy Slater Show is syndicated on WMEN 640-AM Fox Sports in Royal Palm Beach, Florida and on iHeartRadio.

== Education ==
Slater started his broadcasting career at Miami Killian Senior High and at Franklin Pierce College, located in Rindge, New Hampshire. Slater also received awards for Sports Show of the Year while attending Lynn University in Boca Raton, Florida.

== Career ==
In early 2008, Slater started hosting The Andy Slater Show. He often appears on Miami's local ABC affiliate WPLG. Slater was the last person to sit down with and publicly interview O.J. Simpson in June 2008 before he was sentenced to prison.

Slater was also one of six judges for Miss Florida USA 2016, and Miss Florida USA 2017.

Slater breaks national stories, which he calls the "Slater Scoop." Among them are the tragic death of Jose Fernandez, Jason Pierre-Paul injuring his hand in a fireworks accident, and Dion Waiters gummy incident on the Miami Heat's team plane.

== Recognition ==
The Miami Herald named Slater the best sports reporter in South Florida.

Slater was named best radio personality and the hardest-working radio reporter by the Miami New Times.
