= WIRK =

Radio station in Indiantown, Florida

- Indiantown, Florida; United States
- Broadcast area: The Palm Beaches; Treasure Coast
- Frequency: 103.1 MHz (HD Radio)
- Branding: New Country 103.1

Programming
- Language: English
- Format: Country music
- Subchannels: HD2: Simulcast of WMEN (sports radio); HD3: Caribbean Gospel HD (Caribbean Gospel)

Ownership
- Owner: Hubbard Broadcasting; (WPB FCC License Sub, LLC)
- Sister stations: WEAT; WMBX; WRMF; WFTL; WMEN

History
- First air date: 1966
- Former call signs: WLMC (1966–1987); WOKC-FM (1987–1994); WPBZ (1994–2012)
- Call sign meaning: Play on the word "Work"

Technical information
- Licensing authority: FCC
- Facility ID: 1246
- Class: C1
- ERP: 90,000 watts
- HAAT: 297 meters (974 ft)
- Transmitter coordinates: 27°1′32.2″N 80°10′42.2″W

Links
- Public license information: Public file; LMS
- Webcast: Listen live
- Website: www.newcountry1031.com; HD3: www.caribbeangospelhd.com

WIRK (103.1 FM, "New Country 103.1") is a radio station licensed to Indiantown, Florida. It airs a country music radio format. It serves the Treasure Coast and Palm Beach County areas, The station is owned by Hubbard Broadcasting, through licensee WPB FCC License Sub, LLC. Its studios are in West Palm Beach and its antenna is located on the west side of Jonathan Dickinson State Park in Hobe Sound, Florida.

== History ==
=== WLMC/WOKC-FM Okeechobee and move-in to West Palm Beach ===
The 103.1 frequency began in Okeechobee in mid-1966 as WLMC, the FM counterpart to the town's established AM station, WOKC. The station was a Class A outlet, covering largely Okeechobee and the immediate area. On New Year's Day 1987, WLMC became WOKC-FM. The station aired a country format.

In 1992, Okeechobee Broadcasters was approved to move the station to its present tower near Hobe Sound, changing the city of license to Indiantown and making WOKC-FM a move-in into the West Palm Beach market; previously, the WOKC stations did not meet requirements to be reported by Arbitron in the West Palm Beach or Fort Pierce markets. Even before the move was completed, it immediately attracted a buyer: the Amaturo Group of Fort Lauderdale, owners of WKGR (98.7 FM) in Fort Pierce. While initial rumors had the station remaining country as "The Frog" to complement WKGR's "Gator" imaging, Amaturo completed the move-in and relaunched 103.1 as WPBZ, named for (and using) the Z Rock syndicated service from Satellite Music Networks.

In 1995, American Radio Systems (ARS), which already owned WIRK-FM 107.9 and WBZT 1290 in West Palm Beach, acquired the Amaturo Group stations; as FCC rules of the time prohibited a company from owning more than two FM stations, American assigned the rights to buy the station, for $10 million, to Palm Beach Radio Broadcasting, whose principal was National Enquirer publisher Peter Callahan. Callahan's involvement came about because Steve Dodge, the chairman of American Radio Systems, was a director of the parent company of the Enquirer.

Palm Beach Radio sold its cluster, along with a station in Buffalo, New York, to Infinity Broadcasting, later known as CBS Radio, in 2000 for $4 million and assumption of liabilities. The move made WPBZ the sister station to WEAT and WIRK. WPBZ aired The Howard Stern Show from 2004 to 2005, when he was replaced by David Lee Roth amid Stern's move to satellite radio.

In 2012, CBS Radio, citing a desire to focus on larger markets, sold its entire cluster in West Palm Beach to Palm Beach Broadcasting for $50 million. The sale included the intellectual unit of adult contemporary WEAT (104.3 FM), but as Palm Beach already owned one FM station (WRMF), it had to divest two of CBS's stations to other buyers. Because the 104.3 FM facility could be moved into the Miami market, it was tagged for sale. On June 1, 2012, Sunny and the WEAT call letters moved from 104.3 (which became WMSF) to 107.9, while WIRK and its long-running country format moved to 103.1 MHz, marking the end for the Now format.

Later in 2013, Palm Beach Broadcasting and its sister company GoodRadio.TV was merged into Goodman's larger holding company Digity, LLC. Digity was in turn acquired by Alpha Media in February 2016.

On September 27, 2018, Alpha Media announced the sale of its West Palm Beach stations to Hubbard Broadcasting. The sale was consummated on January 23, 2019 at a purchase price of $88 million. WIRK rebranded as New Country 103.1 on July 22, 2019, with no change in format.

== Programming ==
As The Buzz, the station had a morning show called The Morning Buzz. The station also syndicated The Howard Stern Show, The David Lee Roth Show, and the Opie & Anthony Show until October 29, 2007. The original program director for The Buzz was Amy Doyle, now of MTV. John O'Connell had been the program director/operations manager since 1996.

Specialty music shows included Buzz Junior, which aired Sunday nights at 10 pm with host Jeremy Steve Clark and featured new music, unsigned local bands, indie bands, and classic songs; and Rock Hard Buzz, which aired Saturday nights at 11 pm with host Metal Mick and featured mostly heavy metal.

The Buzz hosted an all-day music festival each year called the "Buzz Bake Sale" which was one of the largest annual music festivals in South Florida. It was usually held on the first Saturday in December in West Palm Beach. The show was always held at the venue now called iTHINK Financial Amphitheatre. The event name was chosen because the first two years featured 13 bands (a "baker's dozen" of bands).
