= WRLX =

Radio station in Riviera Beach, Florida

- Riviera Beach, Florida; United States
- Broadcast area: The Palm Beaches
- Frequency: 94.3 MHz (HD Radio)
- Branding: Mia 94.3

Programming
- Language: Spanish
- Format: Contemporary hit radio
- Affiliations: Premiere Networks

Ownership
- Owner: iHeartMedia; (iHM Licenses, LLC)
- Sister stations: WAVW; WBZT; WCZR; WJNO; WKGR; WLDI; WOLL; WQOL; WZTA; WZZR

History
- First air date: 1971
- Former call signs: WGMW (1971–1979); WNJY (1979–1988); WMXQ (1988–1989); WOLL (1989–1998); WWLV (1998–2003); WZZR (2003–2020)
- Call sign meaning: Relax

Technical information
- Licensing authority: FCC
- Facility ID: 36544
- Class: C2
- ERP: 50,000 watts
- HAAT: 139 m (456 ft)
- Transmitter coordinates: 26.762°N 80.078083°W

Links
- Public license information: Public file; LMS
- Webcast: Listen live (via iHeartRadio)
- Website: mia943.iheart.com

WRLX (94.3 FM) is a radio station licensed to Riviera Beach, Florida, United States. Owned by iHeartMedia, It serves the West Palm Beach market, and broadcasting a Spanish-language contemporary hit radio format. Its studios are in Continental Drive in West Palm Beach, and the transmitter is off Hill Avenue, also in West Palm Beach.

== History ==
The station began broadcasting in 1971, and held the call sign WGMW. It aired an easy listening format. In 1979, its call sign was changed to WNJY, and it aired a beautiful music format. In 1982, the station was sold to Lappin Communications for $1.6 million. In 1983, the station adopted an adult standards format, and became an affiliate of Music of Your Life. It was branded "Joy 94".

In September 1988, its call sign was changed to WMXQ and it adopted an adult contemporary format. In November 1989, its call sign was changed to WOLL and it adopted an oldies format. In May 1996, its format was shifted to classic hits. In August 1998, the station adopted a smooth jazz format, and in September its call sign was changed to WWLV. It was part of a simulcast with 93.9 WLVE in Miami Beach.

In January 2003, the station's call sign was changed to WZZR, and it adopted a hot talk format, with the format and call sign moving from 92.7 in Stuart, Florida. It was branded "Real Radio" and was part of a simulcast with WCZR (101.7 FM) in Vero Beach. On June 1, 2020, the station swapped formats and call signs with Spanish-language AC formatted 92.1 FM WRLX.

== HD Radio ==
WRLX is licensed to broadcast in the HD Radio (hybrid) format. Its HD2 subchannel formerly carried an alternative rock format, and brands itself as Alt 94.3, As of August 2022 it does not broadcast any subchannels.
