= WMBX =

Radio station in Jensen Beach, Florida

- Jensen Beach, Florida; United States
- Broadcast area: West Palm Beach metropolitan area; Treasure Coast
- Frequency: 102.3 MHz (HD Radio)
- Branding: X 102.3

Programming
- Language: English
- Format: Urban adult contemporary
- Affiliations: Premiere Networks

Ownership
- Owner: Hubbard Broadcasting; (WPB FCC License Sub, LLC)
- Sister stations: WEAT; WFTL; WIRK; WMEN; WRMF

History
- First air date: December 10, 1980; 45 years ago
- Former call signs: WHLG (1980–1997)
- Call sign meaning: West Palm Beach's X102.3

Technical information
- Licensing authority: FCC
- Facility ID: 25756
- Class: C1
- ERP: 100,000 watts
- HAAT: 297 meters (974 ft)
- Transmitter coordinates: 27°1′32″N 80°10′43″W

Links
- Public license information: Public file; LMS
- Webcast: Listen live
- Website: www.x1023.com

WMBX (102.3 FM, "X 102.3") is a commercial radio station licensed to Jensen Beach, Florida. It serves the West Palm Beach and Treasure Coast areas, broadcasting an urban adult contemporary radio format. WMBX is owned by Hubbard Broadcasting. Its studios and offices are in West Palm Beach. On weekday mornings, it carries The Steve Harvey Morning Show from Premiere Networks.

The transmitter is located on the west side of Jonathan Dickinson State Park in Hobe Sound, Florida. The tower is 965 feet in height above average terrain (HAAT), and shares a transmitter tower with WIRK and WKGR. WMBX has an effective radiated power (ERP) of 100,000 watts. It sometimes can be picked up as far south as Miami, as far north as Cocoa Beach and as far west as Moore Haven.

== History ==
On December 10, 1980, the station signed on as WHLG. It was a rare radio station in that era, owned and run by a woman. Genevieve Glascock was both the owner and general manager. The station aired a beautiful music format and had studios in Stuart, Florida. It was powered at only 3,000 watts, a fraction of its current output. From 1997 to 2001, the station played an adult contemporary format, under the branding Mix 102.3 and changing the call sign to WMBX.

On October 23, 2001, X 102.3 was launched and airing a rhythmic contemporary format, and retaining the WMBX call sign. The station hosted its first concert on November 6, 2009 at the South Florida Fair Grounds, titled "X-Fest 2009." Acts included Clipse and Mario.

In 2006, R&R moved WMBX from the Rhythmic panel to the Urban panel. In May 2007, R&R moved the station back to the Rhythmic panel due to a shift in its direction which switched to a broader Rhythmic playlist.

On April 10, 2012, CBS Radio announced that it was selling WMBX and its sister stations in West Palm Beach to Palm Beach Broadcasting for $50 million, pending FCC approval. The station's Rhythmic format and airstaff were retained under the new owners. After sister station WUUB dropped its adult R&B format in February 2013 to become the West Palm Beach affiliate of ESPN Radio upon being sold to Good Karma, WMBX gravitated its direction to the broader urban contemporary format and added more R&B to its playlist.

On May 13, 2013, WMBX began airing the Steve Harvey Morning Show weekdays from 6 to 10 am, using Reggie Dee to provide local content during breaks.

On February 25, 2016, Digity, LLC (parent company of Palm Beach Broadcasting) and its 124 radio stations were acquired by Alpha Media for $264 million.

On September 27, 2018, Alpha Media announced the sale of its West Palm Beach stations to Hubbard Broadcasting. The sale was consummated on January 23, 2019 at a purchase price of $88 million.

== HD programming ==
WMBX broadcast two channels in the HD Radio (digital) format.

On June 5, 2015, at 4 pm, WMBX-HD2/W242CI launched "Beatz 96.3". It filled a hole when WMBX gradually shifted from urban contemporary to urban AC, following the sale of former sister station WUUB in February 2013.

On July 9, 2019, at noon, WMBX-HD2/W242CI began stunting with bird sounds. Two days later, WMBX-HD2/W242CI launched a contemporary hit radio format, branded as "Party 96.3". Later in 2019, “Party 96.3“ moved to sister station WRMF's HD4 sub-channel, and WMBX ceased broadcasting in HD Radio.

== Mixers ==
- DJ Menace

== Personalities ==
- Steve Harvey Morning Show
- NaySimone
- Mark McCrazy
- KJ (The Love Zone)
