= WLHR-FM =

- Lavonia, Georgia; United States
- Broadcast area: Franklin and Hart Counties, Georgia
- Frequency: 92.1 MHz
- Branding: "92.1 WLHR, Lake Hartwell Radio"

Programming
- Format: Contemporary and Classic Country music and local news, weather, high school sports, obituary announcements, Swap-Shop
- Affiliations: ABC Radio News, Westwood One Classic Country and Mainstream Country.

Ownership
- Owner: Georgia-Carolina Radiocasting Companies; (Lake Hartwell Radio, Inc.)
- Sister stations: WNCC-FM, W267AD, WNCC-1, WFSC, WRBN-FM, WRBN-FM HD2 W262CE (branded as Real Country 100.3 WGHC), WNEG-AM and W226BY, WSNW-AM and W231BX, and WGOG-FM.

History
- First air date: May 15, 2008
- Former call signs: WWRK-FM (1979–1981); WWRK (1981–1988); WWRK-FM (1988–2004); WSGC-FM (2004–2008)
- Call sign meaning: W Lake Hartwell Radio & W Lavonia Hartwell Royston

Technical information
- Licensing authority: FCC
- Facility ID: 54561
- Class: A
- ERP: 6,000 watts
- HAAT: 112.9 meters

Links
- Public license information: Public file; LMS
- Webcast: Listen Live
- Website: http://www.921wlhr.com

WLHR-FM (92.1 FM, "Lake Hartwell Radio") is a radio station broadcasting a Contemporary and Classic Country music format, and local news, high school sports, and Swap-Shop. The station is licensed to Lavonia, Georgia, United States. The station is currently owned by Georgia-Carolina Radiocasting Company.

== History ==
Logo used until May 2008

The station went on the air as WSGC-FM IN 1973, licensed to Elberton, GA, playing Beautiful Music. On November 24, 1981, the station changed its call sign to WWRK. On November 1, 1988, the call sign was changed back to WWRK-FM. On February 2, 2004, the call sign was changed to WSGC-FM with a country music format as "92.1 WSGC". On March 31, 2008, after 92.1 FM had already been granted permission to move and re-license to Lavonia, GA the call sign was changed to WLHR-FM. WLHR-FM signed on on May 15, 2008. The station goes by the moniker "Lake Hartwell Radio" and serves Franklin and Hart Counties, Georgia. On May 9, 2008, the WSGC-FM callsign and Country music format was moved to 105.3 FM in Elberton, Georgia as "105.3 WSGC" with a similar branding and logo previously used by WSGC-FM 92.1.

During the early morning hours of January 30, 2010, the WLHR-FM tower was toppled. The tower, which stood at 284 feet tall and was located on Georgia Highway 327, fell over. The cause is believed to have been sabotage. On, Saturday, February 13, 2010, at approximately 3:30pm, WLHR-FM returned to the air operating from a temporary tower site. Toccoa Falls College radio station WRAF-FM was instrumental in helping WLHR-FM get back on the air by loaning the station a 2KW transmitter.

On, Saturday, July 16, 2011, WLHR-FM signed on from its new permanent tower site in Bowersville, Georgia with noticeably improved coverage over its city of license Lavonia, Georgia. WLHR's new mast stands 223 ft. tall.

== Awards ==
On June 11, 2011, WLHR-FM won four awards from the Georgia Association of Broadcasters. The awards included the following: Small Market Station of the Year for 2011, GABBY Award for the best produced promotional piece/PSA (Class A market) "Traffic Goat," MERIT Award for the best produced promotional piece/PSA (Class A market) "Stormcast," and MERIT Award for the best produced commercial (Class A market) "Ron's Florist-St. Patrick's Day." WLHR was also the recipient of a MERIT Award from the Georgia Association of Broadcasters for best produced commercial (Class A market) in 2010.

On October 13, 2011, WLHR-FM received another prestigious award, The Franklin County Chamber of Commerce Bruce Knighton Business of the Year Award for 2011.

On January 25, 2013, WLHR-FM received the prestigious Hart County Chamber of Commerce Small Business of the Year Award for 2012.
