= WJNO =

Radio station in West Palm Beach, Florida

- West Palm Beach, Florida; United States
- Broadcast area: Palm Beach County; Miami metropolitan area (limited)
- Frequency: 1290 kHz
- Branding: Newsradio 1290 WJNO

Programming
- Format: News/talk
- Affiliations: Fox News Radio; Miami Dolphins Radio Network; Premiere Networks; Westwood One; WPTV-TV

Ownership
- Owner: iHeartMedia; (iHM Licenses, LLC)
- Sister stations: WAVW; WBZT; WCZR; WKGR; WLDI; WOLL; WQOL; WZTA; WZZR; WRLX

History
- First air date: July 21, 1947
- Former call signs: WIRK (1947–1982); WPCK (1983–1987); WPBG (1987–1992); WBZT (1992–2000)
- Call sign meaning: Abbreviation of "John", reference to John R. Beacham, builder of WJNO (1230 AM), now WBZT

Technical information
- Licensing authority: FCC
- Facility ID: 1917
- Class: B
- Power: 10,000 watts (day); 4,900 watts (night)
- Transmitter coordinates: 26°45′51.2″N 80°12′16.2″W
- Repeater: 98.7 WKGR-HD2 (Wellington)

Links
- Public license information: Public file; LMS
- Webcast: Listen live (via iHeartRadio)
- Website: wjno.iheart.com

WJNO (1290 kHz) is a commercial news/talk radio station licensed to serve West Palm Beach, Florida, covering Palm Beach County and portions of the Miami metropolitan area. Owned by iHeartMedia, WJNO serves as the local affiliate for: Fox News Radio; The Glenn Beck Program, The Clay Travis and Buck Sexton Show, The Sean Hannity Show, The Mark Levin Show, The Dave Ramsey Show and Coast to Coast AM; and syndicated personalities Kim Komando, Ric Edelman and Bill Handel. The WJNO studios are located in West Palm Beach, while the station transmitter resides in nearby Loxahatchee. In addition to a standard analog transmission, WJNO streams online via iHeartRadio.

This station is the second station in the West Palm Beach area—and the third AM station overall—to use the WJNO call sign, which originated on the former WJNO (1230 AM) in 1936; that station is now known as WBZT. WJNO is also notable as being the first station in the market to use the WIRK call sign when it signed on in 1947; it is unrelated to the current WIRK.

== History ==
=== WIRK ===
West Palm Beach got its third radio station in 1947 when WIRK began broadcasting at 1290 kHz. Owned by Ken-Sell, Inc., the station broadcast with 1,000 watts and had its transmitter on Military Trail and studios in the basement of the Citizens' Building. Not long after going on air, WIRK affiliated with the Mutual Broadcasting System.

The early 1950s saw several advancements for WIRK. In 1952, ground was broken on a new business building at 711 S. Flagler Drive, on the shores of Lake Worth, to house WIRK and Remington Rand. WIRK increased its power to 5,000 watts in 1953, and September 13 saw the launch of its television adjunct, WIRK-TV (channel 21), the first TV station in the Palm Beaches.

WIRK-TV operated at a financial loss until folding on February 29, 1956. After it closed, one of the partners in Ken-Sell sold his share in the company to WIRK radio-TV sports director Rome Hartman.

In 1965, WIRK launched an FM outlet at 107.9 FM, first bearing the call letters WPBF but changing to WIRK-FM in 1971. While WIRK remained a rock radio station, WIRK-FM became a successful country outlet.

WIRK-AM-FM was sold for the first time in its history in 1983 to Price Communications for $7 million. Price relaunched the AM station, which had in August 1982 flipped from adult contemporary to country, as WPCK "13AM", trying to give it a separate identity from its FM country sister. However, the station's move to big band music accompanying the format change was rolled back in 1985 when WIRK returned to country; the next year, it began simulcasting WIRK-FM. In 1987, WIRK became WPBG, airing the syndicated "Pure Gold" oldies format.

In February 1992, 1290 AM flipped to talk and changed its call letters to WBZT. The new station aired sports programming, including the then-new ESPN Radio, as well as sports play-by-play and talk jocks including Rush Limbaugh. The 1990s saw a series of sales involving WBZT. Price sold WIRK and WBZT to American Radio Systems in 1994.

=== WJNO comes to 1290 ===
Former logo

In January 2000, Clear Channel Communications swapped the intellectual units of WJNO (1230 AM) and WBZT, resulting in WJNO—the oldest radio station in West Palm Beach—moving to 1290 kHz. The frequency change also came with turmoil, as longtime WJNO host Jack Cole, who had been at the station since 1984, was fired, with Randi Rhodes moved to afternoon drive. Cole said he was informed of the decision about half an hour before he was to begin his regular 3-to-7 p.m. show; operations director Jim Edwards said that it was Clear Channel's decision to take the radio station "in a new direction".

Rhodes moved to New York City in March 2004 to join the new Air America Radio liberal talk network, with her syndicated show continuing to air on WJNO. After her dismissal from Air America due to remarks made at a fund-raiser for KKGN deriding Hillary Clinton as a "whore" as part of a comedy routine, Rhodes returned to producing the show from WJNO.; Nova M Radio became Rhodes's new syndicator. Except for a three-month break related to a contract dispute with Nova M—at which time Clear Channel-owned Premiere Radio Networks took over syndication duties—Rhodes remained on WJNO until she ended her program in 2014.

== Programming ==
WJNO personalities Brian Mudd and Joel Malkin host the local morning show; The Glenn Beck Program, (via Premiere Networks) and Financial Exchange with Barry Armstrong both air in late mornings. The Clay Travis and Buck Sexton Show and The Sean Hannity Show, (both via Premiere) air in middays and afternoons, while The Mark Levin Show (via Westwood One) and The Dave Ramsey Show air in the evenings. Ground Zero with Clyde Lewis and Coast to Coast AM (both via Premiere) air in late evenings and overnights. Weekend hosts include Kim Komando, Bill Handel and Ric Edelman.

After having moved from New York City to Florida, Rush Limbaugh hosted his syndicated program from a home studio in Palm Beach County, unofficially making WJNO a "home station" for the show.
