= WRMF =

Radio station in Palm Beach, Florida

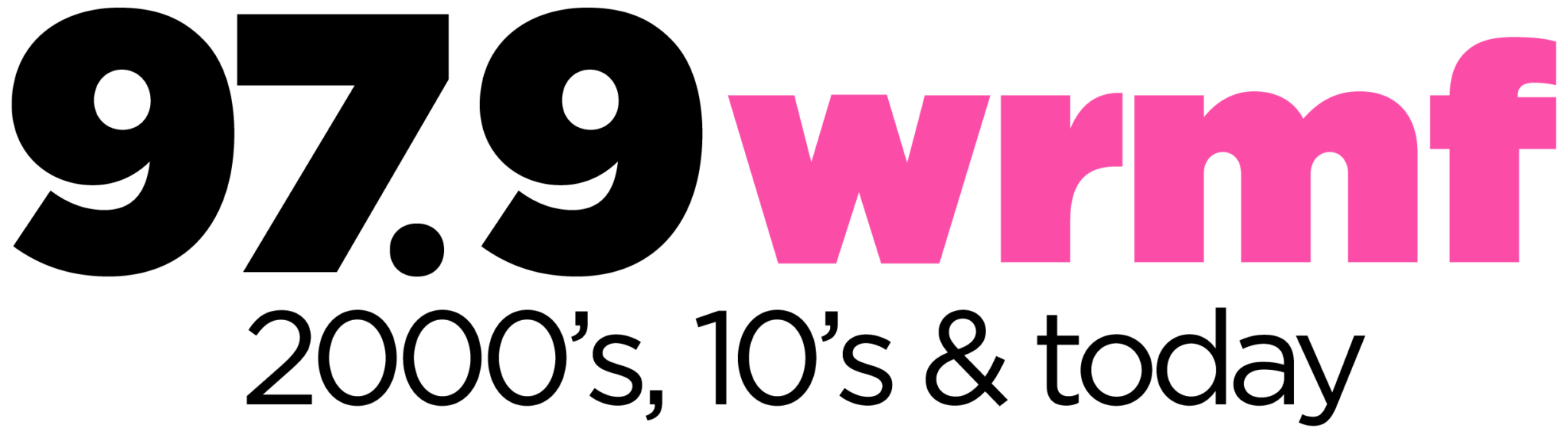
- Palm Beach, Florida; United States
- Broadcast area: Palm Beach County; Miami metropolitan area
- Frequency: 97.9 MHz (HD Radio)
- RDS: 979WRMF
- Branding: 97.9 WRMF

Programming
- Language: English
- Format: Hot adult contemporary
- Subchannels: HD2: Simulcast of WFTL (talk radio); HD3: Simulcast of WPBR (Haitian Creole talk and contemporary hits)

Ownership
- Owner: Hubbard Broadcasting; (WPB FCC License Sub, LLC)
- Sister stations: WEAT; WFTL; WIRK; WMBX; WMEN

History
- First air date: March 17, 1957
- Former call signs: WQXT-FM (1957–1964); WWOS (1964–1971); WMUM (1971–1973); WJNO-FM (1973–1980)
- Call sign meaning: Richard M. Fairbanks (previous owner)

Technical information
- Licensing authority: FCC
- Facility ID: 20436
- Class: C
- ERP: 100,000 watts
- HAAT: 413 meters (1,355 ft)
- Transmitter coordinates: 26°34′30.7″N 80°14′31.1″W

Links
- Public license information: Public file; LMS
- Webcast: Listen live
- Website: www.wrmf.com

WRMF (97.9 FM) is a commercial radio station in Palm Beach, Florida. It serves the northern sections of the Miami metropolitan area, including West Palm Beach and Fort Lauderdale. The station airs a hot adult contemporary radio format and is owned by Hubbard Broadcasting. The studios and offices are on Northpoint Parkway in West Palm Beach. For the past three decades, WRMF has been at or close to #1 in the West Palm Beach radio market ratings.

WRMF has an effective radiated power of 100,000 watts. The transmitter is in Lake Worth, west of U.S. Route 441. WRMF is licensed to broadcast in the HD Radio digital format. The HD2 subchannel simulcasts the talk radio format on sister station WFTL. The HD3 subchannel carries Haitian Creole talk and contemporary hits from co-owned WPBR. The HD4 subchannel carries a caribbean radio format.

== History ==
=== WQXT-FM, WWOS ===
On March 17, 1957, the station signed on as WQXT-FM, the FM counterpart to WQXT (now WPBR), under the ownership of the Flame Radio & TV Corporation. They simulcast a full service middle of the road format of adult popular music and news, with national shows from the ABC Radio Network. The studios were located on Lake Worth Beach.

In 1963, WQXT-AM-FM were sold to Fairfax Broadcasting. The following year, the FM station's call sign was changed to WWOS, standing for Wonderful World of Stereo," when the station began broadcasting in FM stereo full time. In 1971, the simulcast with WQXT ended, as WWOS switched to Progressive Rock using the call letters WMUM for "The Mother."

=== WJNO-FM, WRMF ===
The station was sold in 1971 to Robert M. Weeks, who also owned WJNO (now WBZT). The FM station became WJNO-FM, "J-98", switching to an album rock format.

WJNO-AM-FM were acquired by Richard M. Fairbanks in July 1979. The FM station's call letters were changed to WRMF in January 1980, representing the owner's initials. Nearly a year later in December 1980, WRMF dropped its album rock format and switched to an adult contemporary format. When the 1990s rolled along, its format would later begin picking up the tempo and its format moved into a hot adult contemporary format by the middle of the decade.

=== Alpha and Hubbard ownership ===
In the 2010s, WRMF was acquired by Alpha Media, based in Portland, Oregon. On September 27, 2018, Alpha Media agreed to sell its cluster in West Palm Beach to Hubbard Radio. The sale, at a price of $88 million, was consummated on January 23, 2019.

== Personalities ==
- The KVJ Show
- Randi West
- Danny & Meghan
- The KVJ Replay
- Shirenna
