= WVGC (AM) =

- Elberton, Georgia; United States
- Frequency: 1400 kHz
- Branding: V99.7

Programming
- Format: Urban adult contemporary

Ownership
- Owner: Stanley Brown; (WSGC Radio LLC)

History
- First air date: 1946 (as WSGC)
- Former call signs: WBON (1946); WSGC (1946–2007); WNGA (2007); WSGC (2007–2015); WMJE (2015); WSGC (2015–2017); WHTD (2017–2022); WGCV (2022); WATG (2022)

Technical information
- Licensing authority: FCC
- Facility ID: 54562
- Class: C
- Power: 1,000 watts
- Transmitter coordinates: 34°6′50.00″N 82°52′52.00″W
- Translator: 99.7 W259DH (Elberton)

Links
- Public license information: Public file; LMS
- Webcast: Listen Live
- Website: thevoice.network

WVGC (1400 kHz) is an AM radio station licensed to Elberton, Georgia, United States. The station is currently owned by Stanley Brown, through licensee WSGC Radio LLC.

== History ==
The station went on the air in 1946 as WSGC. On August 10, 2007, the station changed its call sign to WNGA; on August 24, 2007, to WSGC; on May 18, 2015, to WMJE; on July 13, 2015, to WSGC; on January 1, 2017, to WHTD; on February 1, 2022, to WGCV; on February 21, 2022, to WATG; and on September 19, 2022, to WVGC.
