= WJNA-FM =

WJNA
- Westminster, South Carolina; United States
- Broadcast area: Elberton, Georgia
- Frequency: 96.7 MHz
- Branding: GNN Radio

Programming
- Format: Christian radio
- Affiliations: GNN Radio

Ownership
- Owner: C.T. Barinowski; (Augusta Radio Fellowship Institute, Inc.)

History
- First air date: 1998 (as WDDA at 105.1)
- Former call signs: WDDA (1998); WEHR (1998–2005); WLVX (2005–2008); WSGC-FM (2008–2015); WSGC (2015); WVGC (2015); WSNW-FM (2015–2016); WMYQ (2016); WVGC (2016–2020)
- Former frequencies: 105.1 MHz (1998–2012); 105.3 MHz (2012–2015)

Technical information
- Licensing authority: FCC
- Facility ID: 84470
- Class: C3
- ERP: 22,500 watts
- HAAT: 106 meters (348 ft)
- Transmitter coordinates: 34°41′15″N 82°59′16″W

Links
- Public license information: Public file; LMS
- Website: gnnradio.org

WJNA (96.7 FM) is a radio station licensed to Westminster, South Carolina, United States. The station is currently licensed to Augusta Radio Fellowship Institute, Inc. It first began broadcasting in 1998 under the call sign WDDA.

== History ==
Former logo used from 2005-2008

The station went on the air at 105.1 FM as WDDA on January 20, 1998 but quickly changed call signs to WEHR on March 6, 1998. On July 1, 2005, the call sign was changed to WLVX with an urban contemporary format as "Love 105.1". On May 9, 2008, the WSGC-FM call sign and country music format dropped from 92.1 FM (now WLHR-FM) were moved to 105.1 FM as "105.1 WSGC".

On March 15, 2010, WSGC-FM moved from Elberton, Georgia to Tignall, Georgia and switched frequencies from 105.1 to 105.3 MHz. The license was issued for this change on February 3, 2012.

On January 6, 2014, WSGC-FM moved from 105.3 to 96.7 MHz. The license was issued for this change on February 2, 2015, and on May 18, 2015, the callsign was slightly changed to WSGC, dropping the "-FM" suffix.

On July 2, 2015, WSGC went silent.

On July 13, 2015, WSGC changed their call letters to WVGC. On December 14, 2015, the call sign was changed again, this time to WSNW-FM. On February 26, 2016, the call sign was changed to WMYQ.

On July 15, 2016, WMYQ moved from Tignall, Georgia to Westminster, South Carolina and returned to the air with a simulcast of country-formatted WSGC 105.3 Tignall, Georgia. The station returned to its former WVGC call sign on August 9, 2016. On March 29, 2020, WVGC changed callsigns to WJNA. The format changed to Christian Radio.

== Previous logo ==
(WSGC-FM's logo when station was at 105.1 FM)
