= WBZT =

Radio station in West Palm Beach, Florida

- West Palm Beach, Florida; United States
- Broadcast area: Palm Beach County
- Frequency: 1230 kHz
- Branding: 1230 The Gambler

Programming
- Format: Sports gambling
- Affiliations: VSiN Radio; Miami Marlins Radio Network; Westwood One Sports

Ownership
- Owner: iHeartMedia, Inc.; (iHM Licenses, LLC)
- Sister stations: WJNO; WKGR; WLDI; WOLL; WRLX; WZZR

History
- First air date: July 31, 1936
- Former call signs: WJNO (1936–1997); WJNA (1997–2000)
- Call sign meaning: Carried over from the former WBZT (1290 AM); now WJNO

Technical information
- Licensing authority: FCC
- Facility ID: 20439
- Class: C
- Power: 1,000 watts unlimited (Pompano Beach and Boynton Beach); 800 watts unlimited (West Palm Beach)
- Transmitter coordinates: 26°45′34.2″N 80°8′39.2″W; 26°15′19.3″N 80°8′48.2″W

Links
- Public license information: Public file; LMS
- Webcast: Listen live (via iHeartRadio)
- Website: 1230thegambler.iheart.com

WBZT (1230 AM) is a radio station broadcasting a sports gambling format. Licensed to West Palm Beach, Florida, United States, the station serves the West Palm Beach area. With a synchronous amplifier in Pompano Beach, it also covers Fort Lauderdale. The station is owned by iHeartMedia, Inc.

== History ==
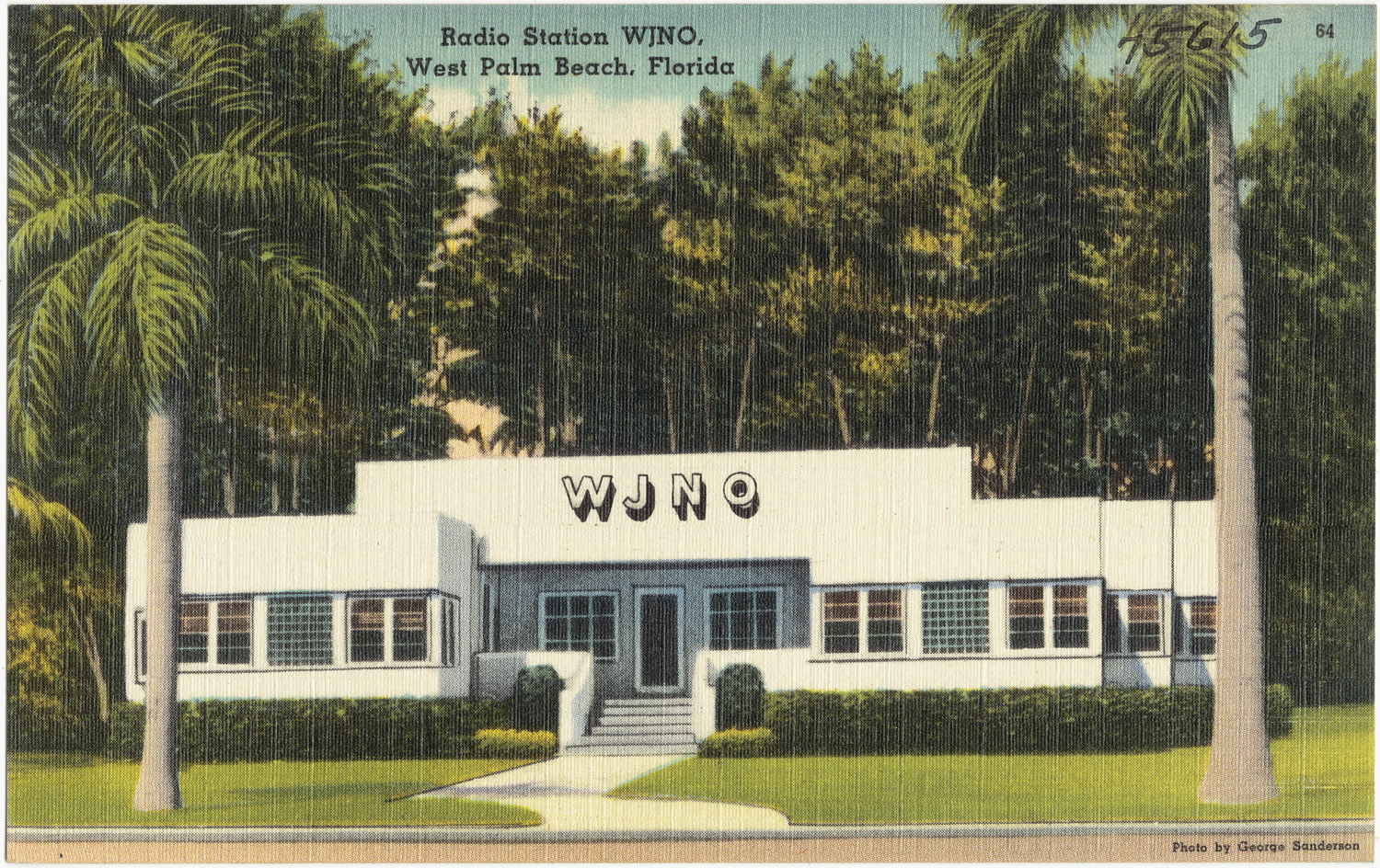
WJNO, between 1936-1945

The station went on the air as WJNO at 1 p.m. on July 31, 1936. According to the Palm Beach Post, WJNO was originally a CBS affiliate, and it aired everything from classical music to Steve Allen.

In September 1943, pollsters found that 94 percent of all radios in use in Palm Beach, West Palm Beach and Lake Worth were tuned to WJNO (1230 AM). At the time, the 7-year-old station was the only signal between Orlando and Miami.

On August 13, 1979, WJNO's program director, John Picano, moved the station to a full-time news station. WJNO switched from national syndicated talk shows during the daytime to local hosts in 1984. Afternoon host Mike ("Captain Radio") Levine left for Tampa and Jack Cole from Boston, at that time 45 years old, took the slot. Cole referred to himself as the "Inquisitor General" and described his program as coming from "World Headquarters".

In September 1984, Barry Young is hired as midday talk host. According to the Palm Beach Post, Young was a conservative "who believes in nuclear energy, the death penalty and, more often than not, Ronald Reagan. Abortion is repugnant, he says, and a vice-presidential candidate that goes by Ferraro-Zaccaro would be better off as a foreign sports-car." Young was first heard on WJNO from early 1980 to 1982 when he was hosting overnights from WRNG in Atlanta. The program was broadcast on a small number of stations via GN (The Georgia Network) and FN (The Florida Network). Young came to WJNO from WGBS in Miami, where he angered management by leaving. "Barry Young has a valid contract with this radio station," Lee Fowler, WGBS operations manager, said.

By 1986, according to the Miami Herald, WJNO was running constant local and state news, punctuated by national feeds, from 6 a.m. to 10 a.m. six days a week. Local talk hosts worked weekdays from 10 a.m. until 8 p.m., when a national talk show network took over.

Barry Young left WJNO in April 1987 to join the staff of new talk station KFYI in Phoenix, Arizona. John Broward and John Levitt did the program until late summer. This time there is no question that Young's contract allowed for his move. In Phoenix, Young would later become a founding partner in WestStar TalkRadio Network, a broadcast syndication company. WJNO carries programming, such as The Kim Komando Show originated bt WestStar. Also in 1987, Mike Miller from WIOD in Miami joined the station.

In May 1988, Jack Cole moved to KFYI. Cole was hired by former WJNO midday host and then KFYI program sirector, Barry Young. Lee Fowler, formerly of WNWS in Miami, moved into the slot. Geoff Charles and Dick Farrel host the program in his absence.

In January 1989, Miller shifted to 9 a.m. to noon, Fowler moved to noon to 3 p.m., and Geoff Charles moved to the afternoon slot. The syndicated Rush Limbaugh Show was on the station briefly. That March, Jack Cole returned to WJNO from Phoenix.

In April 1993, Miller was fired and replaced with the syndicated G. Gordon Liddy show. Miller returned the following year hosting afternoon drive at WBZT (1290 AM), then moved to Jacksonville and eventually left radio.

In September 1994, Randi Rhodes, then 36, is brought in from WIOD, where she was the evening talk show host. General manager George Mills said Rhodes would bring a "younger, more aggressive approach" to the station's lineup. "She's very talented. I think she'll be a positive addition," Mills said.

In March 1997, Fairbanks Communications purchased a station at 1040 AM and moved WJNO to that spot on the dial, after more than six decades at 1230, to take advantage of its strong signal strength in southern Palm Beach and Broward counties.

Logo as a talk station

In January 2000, WJNO and WBZT swapped frequencies. WJNO moved to 1290 AM and WBZT moved to 1230 AM. The switch was designed to boost WJNO's signal in all of Palm Beach County but weaken it in Broward and Miami-Dade, where it competed with other Clear Channel properties. On December 20, 2000, the 1230 facility changed its call sign from WJNA to WBZT.

On July 31, 2017, WBZT changed its format from news/talk to sports, branded as "1230 The Zone", with programming from CBS Sports Radio. On June 9, 2022, WBZT relaunched the sports format with an emphasis on sports gambling, branded as "1230 The Gambler" and carrying programming from VSiN.
