= WFLM (disambiguation) =

WFLM is a radio station (91.1 FM) licensed to serve Fort Pierce, Florida, United States.

WFLM may also refer to:

- WPBB, a radio station (104.7 FM) licensed to serve Palm Beach Shores, Florida, which held the call sign WFLM from 1993 to 2026
- WXRD, a radio station (103.9 FM) licensed to serve Crown Point, Indiana, United States, which held the call sign WFLM from 1972 to 1982
