= WLRN =

WLRN may refer to:

- WLRN-TV, a television station (channel 26, virtual channel 17) licensed to serve Miami, Florida, United States
- WLRN-FM, a radio station (91.3 FM) licensed to serve Miami, Florida
