= WQCP =

WQCP may refer to:

- WQCP (FM), a radio station (88.5 FM) licensed to serve Clewiston, Florida, United States
- WFLM, a radio station (91.1 FM) licensed to serve Fort Pierce, Florida, which held the call sign WQCP from 2021 to 2026
