= Night Train (radio show) =

- Genre: Jazz/Blues/Standards
- Running time: 240 minutes
- Country of origin: United States
- Language: English
- Home station: 91.3 FM WLRN, South Florida; 91.5 FM WKWM, Florida Keys*; *Simulcast of WLRN
- Hosted by: Ted Grossman
- Recording studio: Miami, Fla.
- Original release: January 2, 1977 – December 29, 2024
- Audio format: Stereophonic
- Opening theme: "Night Train", Jimmy Forrest, composer
- Ending theme: Same as opening theme
- Website: Night Train

Night Train was a four-hour-long, weekly radio program originating from public radio station WLRN-FM in Miami, Florida. It aired from January 2, 1977 to December 29, 2024 and was the longest-running radio show in South Florida history. The sole host for its nearly 48-year run was Ted Grossman. Each broadcast featured an eclectic mix of big band, blues, and jazz recordings dating from the '30s to the present.

== Format ==
The show aired live on Sunday nights from 8:00 to midnight EST and was simulcast live to the Florida Keys on WLRN's affiliate, WKWM.

Jimmy Forrest's 1951 instrumental jazz standard "Night Train" served as the show's eponymous opening and closing theme music.

Many shows were built around a theme featuring the recordings of a particular jazz performer (example: Duke Ellington) or vocalist (example: Frank Sinatra), or around a holiday, such as Halloween or Christmas.

During one 25-year stretch, the show aired one full-length Glenn Miller Orchestra broadcast per month.

Occasionally, the show invited local or nationally-known recording artists or other musicians as in-studio guests, with Grossman playing recordings and quizzing his guest about the identity of the recording's performer(s) or vocalist(s).

The last hour of the show typically featured a music segment titled "Jazz Can Be Beautiful."

In keeping with the show's locomotive-themed title, Grossman was known for donning a train conductor's striped railroad hat as he broadcast each week. The Miami Herald once described the show as a "rambling, rumbling three-hour local service with stops at Big Band, Dixieland, The Blues and Crooner City."

In its early years (in the late 1970s), the show aired on Friday nights from 11 p.m. to 2 a.m.

== Audience ==
A 2024 Radio Online article said:

"Listeners of 'The Night Train' span generations, with older audiences reliving the tunes of their youth and younger fans discovering the allure of vintage sounds. Grossman's approachable delivery and rich narratives transform each episode into a learning experience, akin to a class on musical heritage."

== History ==
Grossman approached WLRN in 1975 when the station expanded its jazz programming. He volunteered his talents. The station's syndicated big band radio show had gone off the air. As Grossman recounted to the Miami Herald in 1983, "You don't have any big-band show, I told them. They let me on to sink or swim."

“I was always interested in big bands," he recounted to the South Florida Sun-Sentinel in 2023. "I started buying records before I had a phonograph. I had this collection. I called the station and told them, ‘Listen, I have this material. I’m used to a microphone. I can speak. You should let me have a job.’ I went in. They said we’re gonna try you out. They showed me how to work a board. Nobody ever pressured me. Nobody ever told me what to play, or what guests to have on the air — to this day. They’re still trying me out. So here I am.”

== Host ==
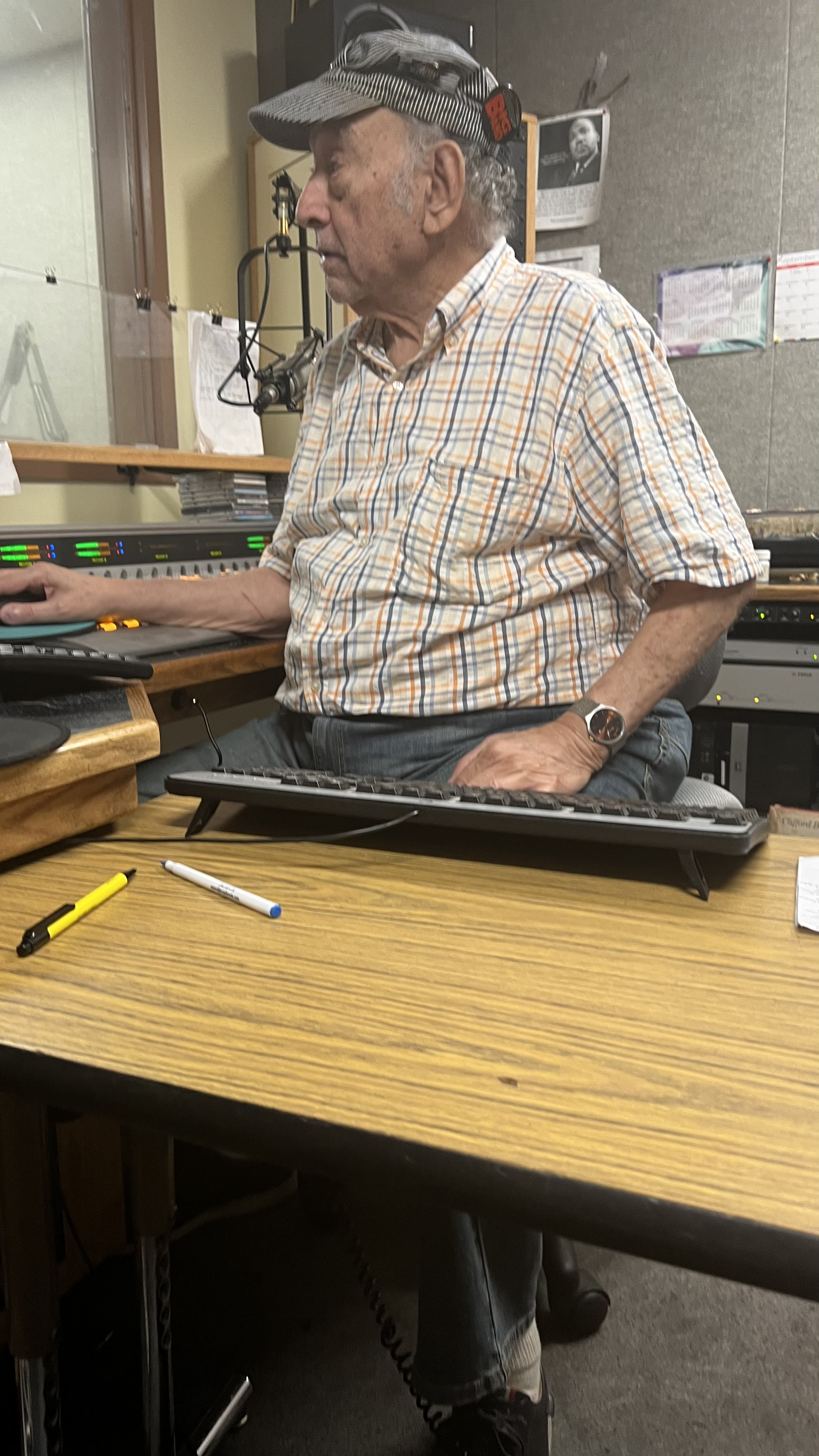
Ted Grossman at the WLRN studios in Miami.

Ted Grossman (1942–2025) hosted the show from its debut in January 1977 until his retirement in December 2024. In addition to playing the recordings on his show, Grossman supplied anecdotes and authoritative commentary about the bands and performers, including album notes and assorted trivia. He often peppered his show with mentions of the birthdays, deaths, or other anniversaries of jazz notables, past and present.

Grossman explained his creed in a 2023 interview: "[Duke Ellington] said there’s only two kinds of music. Good and bad. It doesn’t have to be jazz. It just has to be good. People say, how do you listen to that old stuff? I’ll say, ‘Wait a minute. Are they still playing Beethoven?’ This is not old. Art is art."

=== Grossman's retirement ===
Night Train was pre-empted on December 1, 2024, by a pre-recorded jazz broadcast. In a recorded announcement at the beginning of the program, WLRN informed listeners that the absent Grossman had decided to retire and that he would host one more broadcast, a "farewell" show, on December 29, 2024, only four days shy of what would have been the show's 48th anniversary.

On its final broadcast, the show signed off with a vocal rendition of "The Party's Over" and an instrumental version of "Auld Lang Syne".

Grossman died eight months later, in August 2025.
