= Ted Grossman =

American radio personality (born 1942)

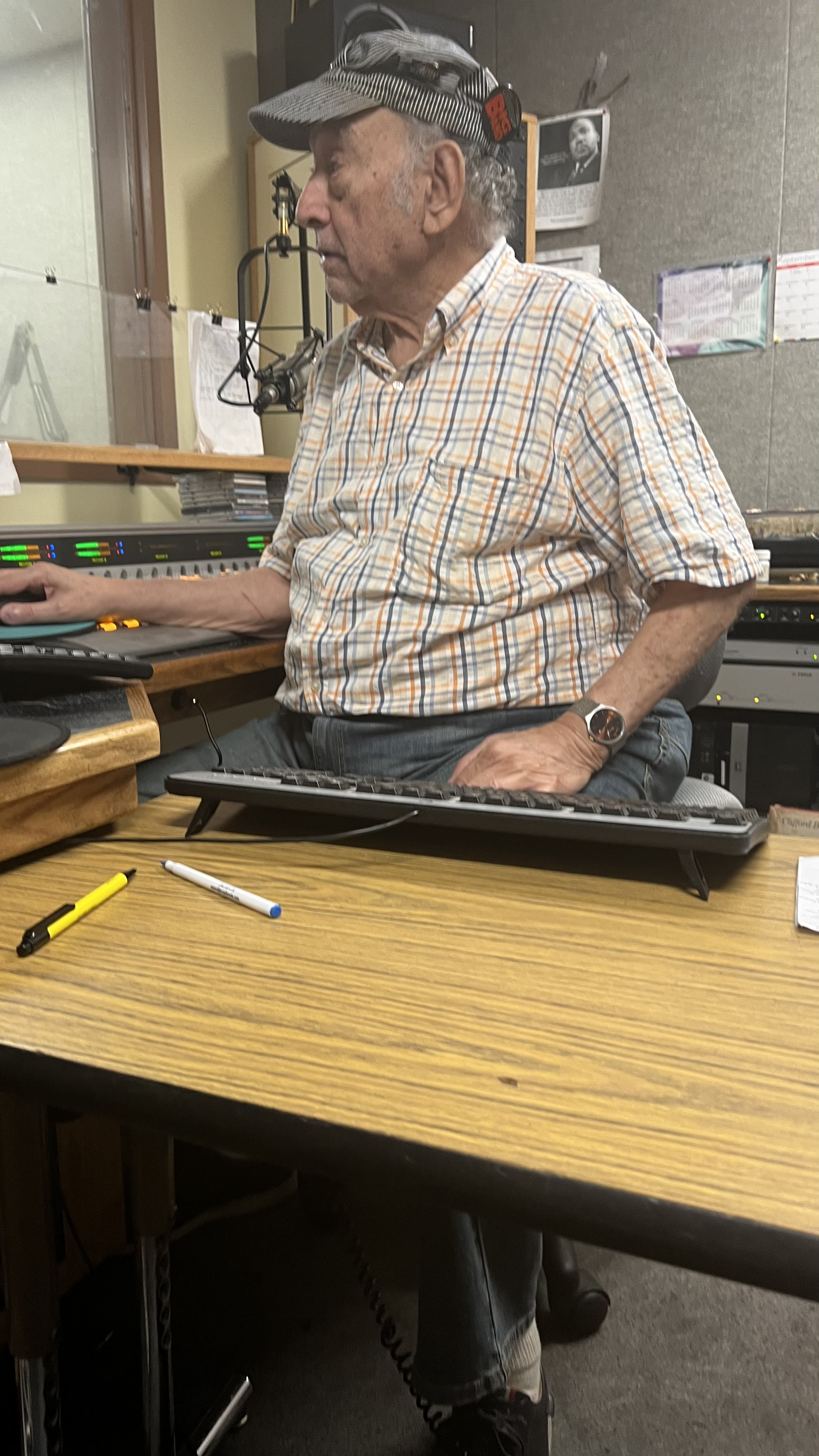
- Grossman at the WLRN Studios
- Born: Theodore Grossman; June 17, 1942; Brooklyn, New York, U.S.
- Died: August 16, 2025 (aged 83); Hollywood, Florida, U.S.
- Presenting career
- Show: Night Train (1977–2024)
- Stations: 91.3 FM WLRN, South Florida; 91.5 FM WKWM, Florida Keys* *Simulcast of WLRN
- Time slot: Sunday
- Time slot: 8 p.m. – midnight
- Style: Big band, Blues and Jazz music
- Country: United States
- Website: www.wlrn.org/programs/night-train-ted-grossman-wlrn

Ted Grossman (June 17, 1942 – August 16, 2025) was a former American radio personality. For nearly 48 years, from 1977 to 2024, he hosted the weekly big band, blues, and jazz music program Night Train on WLRN-FM in Miami, Florida, the longest-running radio program in South Florida history.

== Early life ==
Theodore Grossman was born in the Brooklyn borough of New York City in 1942. His family moved to Miami Beach, Florida, in 1949. He graduated from North Miami High School in North Miami, Florida, in 1960 and was a speech major at Dade Junior College (now Miami-Dade College). Grossman left college at 22 to join the U.S. Air Force during the Vietnam War.

One of his earliest jobs for which he was paid for his speaking skills was in 1967 when he announced the dolphin shows at the Miami Seaquarium for $90 a week. Later, he worked as a parts manager for an appliance store. Eventually, he became a postal employee, driving over 100 miles (160 km) a day carrying special delivery letters for the U.S. Postal Service. He worked for the USPS for 34 years, retiring in 2009.

"The first live jazz I saw," Grossman told the Miami Herald in 1983,

"was when my father and a friend of his took me to the Sir John Hotel in Miami, about 1962. [Count] Basie's doing an afternoon concert, three bucks. It was 'April in Paris' they played, and Sonny Payne, the drummer, got the solo. The band got up and walked off, had a drink, while Payne put on a wild show, throwing up his sticks and all. He did ten minutes, then the guys came back and finished it off with a bang. I don't care what kind of music you like, you see that, it knocks you out."

== Career ==
While still a mail carrier, Grossman approached public radio station WLRN in 1975 when the station expanded its jazz programming. He volunteered his talents. The station's syndicated big band radio show had gone off the air. As Grossman recounted to the Miami Herald in 1983, "You don't have any big-band show, I told them. They let me on to sink or swim."

“I was always interested in big bands," he recounted to the South Florida Sun-Sentinel in 2023. "I started buying records before I had a phonograph. I had this collection. I called the station and told them, ‘Listen, I have this material. I’m used to a microphone. I can speak. You should let me have a job.’ I went in. They said we’re gonna try you out. They showed me how to work a board. Nobody ever pressured me. Nobody ever told me what to play, or what guests to have on the air — to this day. They’re still trying me out. So here I am.”

Grossman kept his day job with the post office because, he joked, "the postal uniform paid the bills while WLRN paid my ego."

== Night Train ==
Grossman's program, Night Train, premiered on WLRN in January 1977. He served as its sole regular host from its debut until his retirement and final broadcast on December 29, 2024. In the late 1970s, it was a three-hour show that aired on Friday nights. In the 1980s, it moved to Sunday nights and expanded to four hours. In later years, it was also simulcast live to the Florida Keys on WLRN's affiliate, WKWM.

"Jazz is an intimate thing, a late-night form. So is radio. Johnny Carson talks to an audience, I talk to you, to one person."

— Grossman, in an October 1983 interview

In addition to playing the recordings on his show, Grossman supplied anecdotes and authoritative commentary about the bands and performers, including album notes and assorted trivia. He often peppered his show with mentions of the birthdays, deaths, or other anniversaries of jazz notables, past and present.

"As if you’re in my living room and I say to you, ‘Hey, come over here, I want you to listen to this.'"

— describing his broadcast style, in January 2007

Occasionally, the show featured local or nationally known recording artists or other musicians as in-studio guests, with Grossman playing recordings and quizzing his guests about the identity of the recording's performer(s) or vocalist(s).

In keeping with the show's locomotive-themed title, Grossman was known for donning a train conductor's striped railroad hat as he broadcast each week. The Miami Herald once described Night Train as a "rambling, rumbling three-hour local service with stops at Big Band, Dixieland, The Blues and Crooner City."

=== Audience ===
A 2024 Radio Online article said:

"Listeners of 'The Night Train' span generations, with older audiences reliving the tunes of their youth and younger fans discovering the allure of vintage sounds. Grossman's approachable delivery and rich narratives transform each episode into a learning experience, akin to a class on musical heritage."

== Personal life ==
Grossman lived in North Miami, Florida. He owned a recording collection numbering in the thousands that he “stopped counting years ago.”

=== Retirement ===
Night Train was pre-empted on December 1, 2024, by a pre-recorded jazz broadcast. In a recorded announcement at the beginning of the program, WLRN informed listeners that the absent Grossman had decided to retire and that he would host one more broadcast, a "farewell" show, on December 29, 2024, only four days shy of what would have been the show's 48th anniversary.

=== Death ===
Grossman died on August 16, 2025 at age 83 following a long bout with cancer. WLRN Radio vice president Peter Maerz remembered Grossman as "a font of knowledge of all things jazz [who] garnered generations of loyal followers. Ted charmed and informed his listeners, week after week, and touched us all with his humor and passion for the music he loved."
