= ABC 17 =

ABC 17 may refer to one of the following television stations in the United States:

== Current ==
- KBMY in Bismarck, North Dakota
- KMIZ in Columbia–Jefferson City, Missouri
- WTVO in Rockford, Illinois

== Former ==
- KLYD-TV/KJTV (now KGET) in Bakersfield, California (1959–1974)
- WTVP/WAND in Decatur–Champaign–Urbana–Springfield, Illinois (1953–2005)
- WITV (now occupied by WLRN-TV) in Miami–Fort Lauderdale, Florida (1953–1957)
- WJKS (now WCWJ) in Jacksonville, Florida (1966–1980 and 1988–1997)
