= Martin County School District =

Public school system in Florida, United States

Address
- 1939 SE Federal Hwy Stuart, Martin, Florida, 34994-2572; United States
- Coordinates: 27.18116°N 80.23816°W

District information
- Type: Public
- Grades: K–12
- Superintendent: Michael Maine
- Schools: 35
- Budget: $200 million (2018)
- NCES District ID: 1201290

Students and staff
- Enrollment: 19,038 (2019)
- Teachers: 1,131 (2019) (on an FTE basis)
- Staff: 2,325 (2019)
- Student–teacher ratio: 17:1 (2019)

Other information
- Website: martinschools.org

Martin County School District, also referred to officially as the School Board of Martin County, is a public school district that covers Martin County, Florida.

The position of superintendent is appointed by the school board. Its former Superintendent, Laurie J. Gaylord, was first elected in 2012, with her second term ending in November 2020. Following a decision by voters in 2018, the next Superintendent was appointed rather than elected. The first appointed superintendent, John D. Millay, took office in 2020. The district is overseen by the Martin County School Board, a body of five elected officers.

== History ==
In 2023 Michael Maine became the superintendent.

That year there were controversies over whether certain books could be displayed in schools.

== School Board ==
The district School Board is elected on a non-partisan basis. Members of the board are:

- District 1: Christia Li Roberts
- District 2: Marsha Powers
- District 3: Victoria Defenthaler
- District 4: Anthony Anderson
- District 5: Michael DiTerlizzi

== Schools ==
The district operates the following public schools:

=== High schools ===
- Jensen Beach High School
- Martin County High School
- South Fork High School

=== Middle schools ===
- Dr. David L. Anderson Middle School. Named for the first Black person to be elected to the county School Board & Florida's longest-serving school board member
- Hidden Oaks Middle School
- Indiantown Middle School
- Murray Middle School. Robert G. Murray, an African American, was a teacher from 1928 to 1937 and from 1945 to 1958 and was principal of Stuart Training School.
- Stuart Middle School

=== Elementary schools ===
- Bessey Creek Elementary School
- Citrus Grove Elementary School
- Crystal Lake Elementary School
- Felix A. Williams Elementary School
- Hobe Sound Elementary School
- Jensen Beach Elementary School
- J.D. Parker School of Science, Math and Technology
- Palm City Elementary School
- Pinewood Elementary School
- Port Salerno Elementary School
- SeaWind Elementary School
- Warfield Elementary School

=== Pre-K ===
- Bessey Creek Elementary School
- Citrus Grove Elementary School
- Felix A. Williams Elementary School
- Perkins Center
- Salerno Schoolhouse
- Salerno Learning Center
- Stuart Learning Center

=== Charter schools ===
- Clark Advanced Learning Center
- The Hope Charter Center for Autism
- Indiantown High School
- Treasure Coast Classical Academy

=== Other programs ===
The district operates the following other programs:

- Career and Technical Education
- Willoughby Learning Center
- Environmental Studies Center
- Martin Virtual School
- Spectrum
- Teenage Parent Center – Florida First Start Resource Center Indiantown
- Teenage Parent Center – Spectrum

=== Former segregated (negro) schools ===
- Booker Park Elementary School, Indiantown, closed 1970
- Dunbar Elementary School, Hobe Sound, closed 1969
- East Stuart Elementary School, Stuart, closed 1970 (turned into county-wide kindergarten magnet)
- Murray Junior/Senior High, Port Salerno (originally Carver Junior/Senior High, also called Carver Training School and Murray Training School), opened 1964 replacing Stuart Training School, closed 1967 (became county-wide 9th grade)
- Stuart Training School, Stuart, closed 1964
- A "one-room schoolhouse in Jensen Beach".
