= Clark Advanced Learning Center =

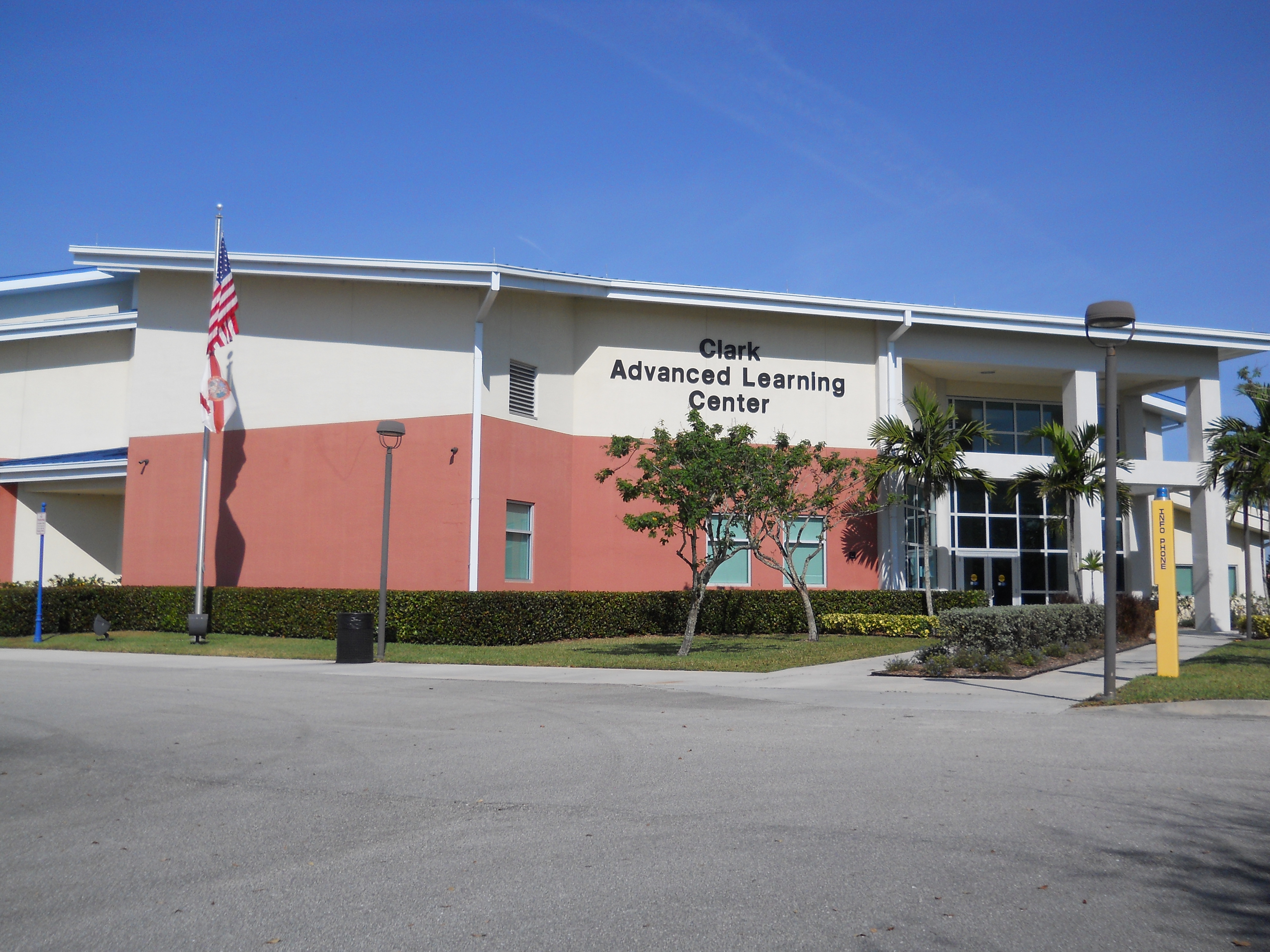

Location
- 2400 Southeast Salerno Road; Stuart, Florida 34997; United States; 27.1352415°N 80.2197487°W

Information
- Type: Public charter high school
- Established: 2004
- Locale: Suburban
- Executive Director: Leslie Judd
- Teaching staff: 7.00 (on an FTE basis)
- Grades: 9-12
- Enrollment: 249 (2023–24)
- Student to teacher ratio: 35.57
- Color: Green
- Mascot: Crane
- Website: Official site

Clark Advanced Learning Center is a public charter high school in Stuart, Florida in the Martin County School District that partners with Indian River State College. The school enrolled 250 students in a 2021 census. Its mascot is the crane and its main color is green. The executive director is Leslie Judd.

Clark Advanced Learning Center has been ranked as the third highest rated Florida high school on the Newsweek 2016 American's Top High Schools ratings, receiving a 110 out of 500 in the national ranking based on college readiness, graduation rate and college bound students.
