= Dunbar Elementary School (Hobe Sound, Florida) =

Former school in Hobe Sound, Florida

Dunbar Elementary School is a former elementary school for African-American students in Hobe Sound, Florida. It was part of the Martin County School District and was named for African-American author Paul Laurence Dunbar. It closed in 1969. One factor is that it was too small and the site not appropriate for expansion.
