= Indian River State College =

Public college in Fort Pierce, Florida, US

- Former names: Indian River Junior College (1959–1970); Indian River Community College (1970–2008)
- Motto: Eruditio, ductus, societas (Latin)
- Motto in English: "Learning, leadership, fellowship"
- Type: Public college
- Established: 1959; 67 years ago
- Founder: Florida Legislature
- Parent institution: Florida College System
- Accreditation: SACS
- Endowment: $28.5 million (2024)
- Budget: $98.5 million (2024)
- President: Timothy E. Moore
- Faculty: 208 (full-time); 353 (part-time)
- Undergraduates: 14,862 (fall 2022)
- Location: Fort Pierce, Florida, U.S. 27.4237°N 80.3579°W
- Campus: Large suburb Main campus: 362 acres (146 ha)
- Other campuses: Stuart; Okeechobee; Vero Beach; Port St. Lucie
- Colors: Blue and gold
- Nickname: The River
- Sporting affiliations: NJCAA Region 8 – Southern Conference
- Mascot: The Peregrine
- Website: irsc.edu
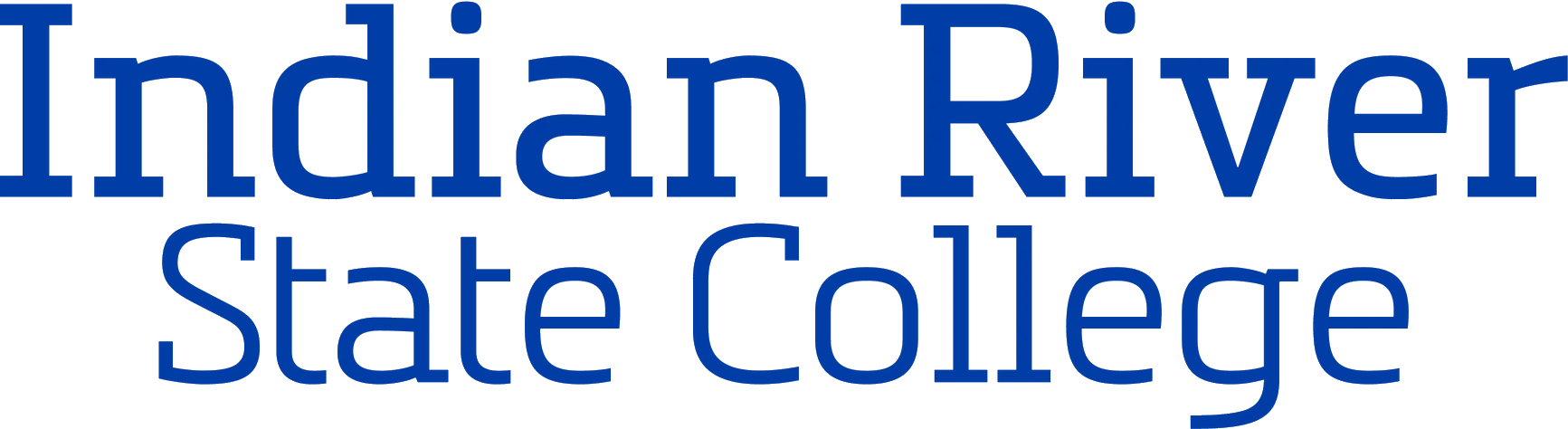

Indian River State College (The River) is a public college based in Fort Pierce, Florida, United States. Serving the Treasure Coast region, it is part of the Florida College System and offers associate and bachelor's degree programs as well as vocational certificates. It was established in 1959.

The college has grown significantly since its inception, with multiple campuses across Indian River, Martin, Okeechobee, and St. Lucie counties. The River is accredited by the Southern Association of Colleges and Schools.

== History ==
The college was established in 1959 as Indian River Junior College by the Florida Legislature to serve the Treasure Coast region of Florida. Originally housed in a single building, the college relocated to its current Fort Pierce campus in 1963 following a donation of 87 acres (35 ha) of land from the city. This move allowed the college to better accommodate its growing student body and expand its educational offerings.

In 1965, following statewide integration efforts, Indian River Junior College merged with Lincoln Junior College, extending its services to Indian River, Martin, Okeechobee, and St. Lucie counties. The institution was renamed Indian River Community College in 1970 to reflect its expanded role and growing impact in the region.

During the 1970s and 1980s, The River continued to develop as a regional educational hub, adding campuses in Vero Beach, Stuart, Okeechobee, and Port St. Lucie, as well as multiple educational centers. The college's growth mirrored the increasing demand for higher education in the Treasure Coast region.

In 2007, The River was authorized to offer bachelor's degrees, marking its transition to a four-year institution. This change was formalized on June 24, 2008, when the college was renamed "Indian River State College" to reflect its expanded academic scope. The introduction of bachelor’s programs allowed The River to provide more advanced educational opportunities to its students.

The college's progress continued with the launch of The River Online in 2013, which expanded access to higher education through online learning. In 2019, The River received the Aspen Prize for Community College Excellence, recognizing its achievements in student outcomes and institutional performance.

Further recent developments include the opening of the Eastman Advanced Workforce Training Complex and the introduction of The River Promise program in 2022, which offers local high school graduates tuition-free enrollment for associate degrees. Additionally, in 2020, the college received a $45 million donation from philanthropist MacKenzie Scott, further supporting its growth and development.

== Campuses ==
=== Main campus ===
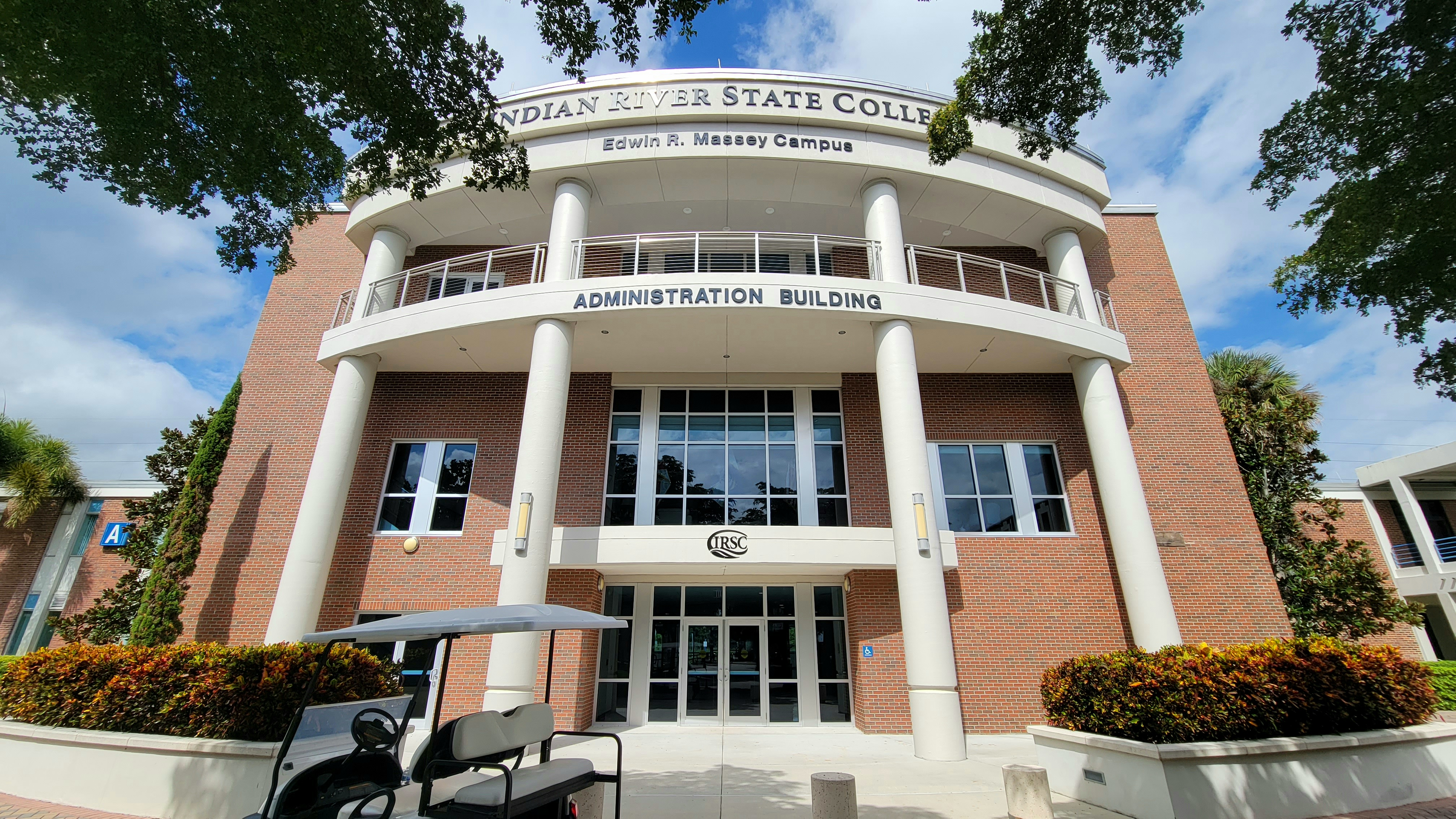
Administration building, Massey campus

The main campus, known as the "Edwin R. Massey campus" (located in Fort Pierce), spans 362 acres (146 ha) with 56 buildings dedicated to a wide range of educational and career training programs. Notable facilities include the Brown Center for Innovation and Entrepreneurship, which focuses on emerging technologies and green construction, and the Kight Center for Emerging Technologies, offering advanced laboratories for manufacturing, photonics, and engineering.

The campus also features the 50-acre (20 ha) Treasure Coast Public Safety Training Complex, providing cutting-edge training in criminal justice and emergency management. Additional facilities include the Mary L. Fields Health Science Center, Hallstrom Planetarium, and the Fine Arts Complex, fostering well-rounded student development.

The campus was named in honor of Edwin R. Massey, who retired as president of the college in 2020.

=== Regional campuses ===
==== Chastain campus ====
The Chastain campus in Stuart serves Martin County with a wide variety of academic and career training programs. Students can complete associate and bachelor's degrees and participate in adult education programs such as the GED and English as a second language (ESL). Key facilities include the Robert Morgade Administration & Student Services Center, which offers academic advising, financial aid, and career services, and the Clare & Gladys Wolf High-Technology Center, which focuses on technical career preparation.

The campus is also home to the Clark Advanced Learning Center, a nationally recognized charter high school where students earn both high school and college credits.

==== Dixon Hendry campus ====
The Dixon Hendry campus, located in Okeechobee, provides flexible day, evening, and weekend courses leading to associate degrees. The campus offers modern technology with computer labs, an academic support center, and GED preparation. Career programs focus on the needs of the local community, including nursing, automotive technology, and welding. The Williamson Conference and Education Center hosts conferences, seminars, and community events, serving both students and local residents.

==== Mueller campus ====
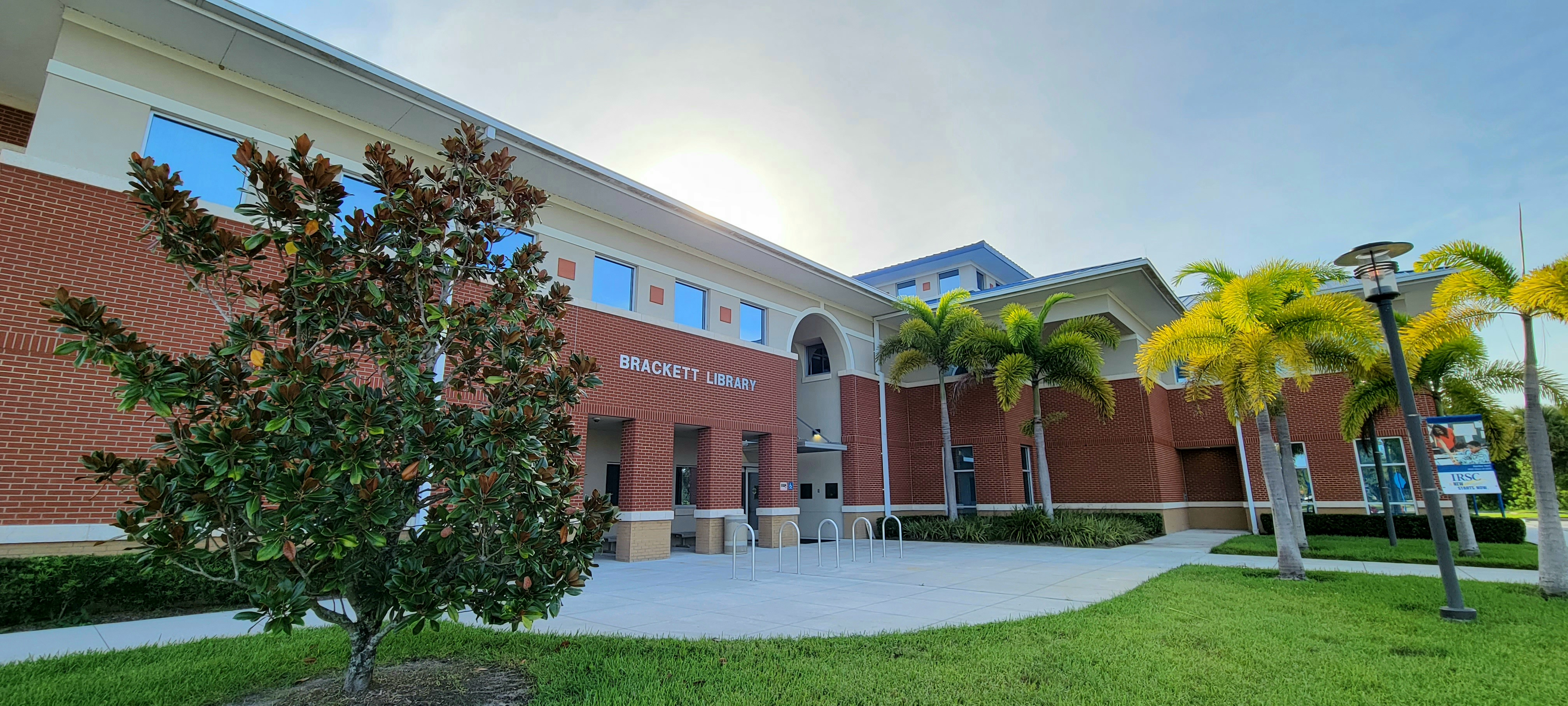
Brackett Library, Mueller campus

Located in Vero Beach, the Mueller campus offers a range of degree programs, including associate and bachelor's degrees, with flexible day, evening, and weekend classes. The campus houses the Brackett Library, a joint-use facility with Indian River County, and the Schumann Center, providing comprehensive student services like financial aid, career counseling, and textbook purchasing. The Richardson Center is home to the Culinary Institute and serves as a hub for community and business events, supporting economic development in the region.

==== Pruitt campus ====
The Pruitt campus in Port St. Lucie, offers a wide range of degree programs, including certifications and both two- and four-year degrees. It is home to the William and Helen Thomas STEM Center, which supports a bachelor's degree program in biology with advanced laboratories. The campus also features the Veterans Center of Excellence, offering support and resources for veterans and their families, and the Enterprise Hub, promoting entrepreneurship and job creation.

== Academics ==
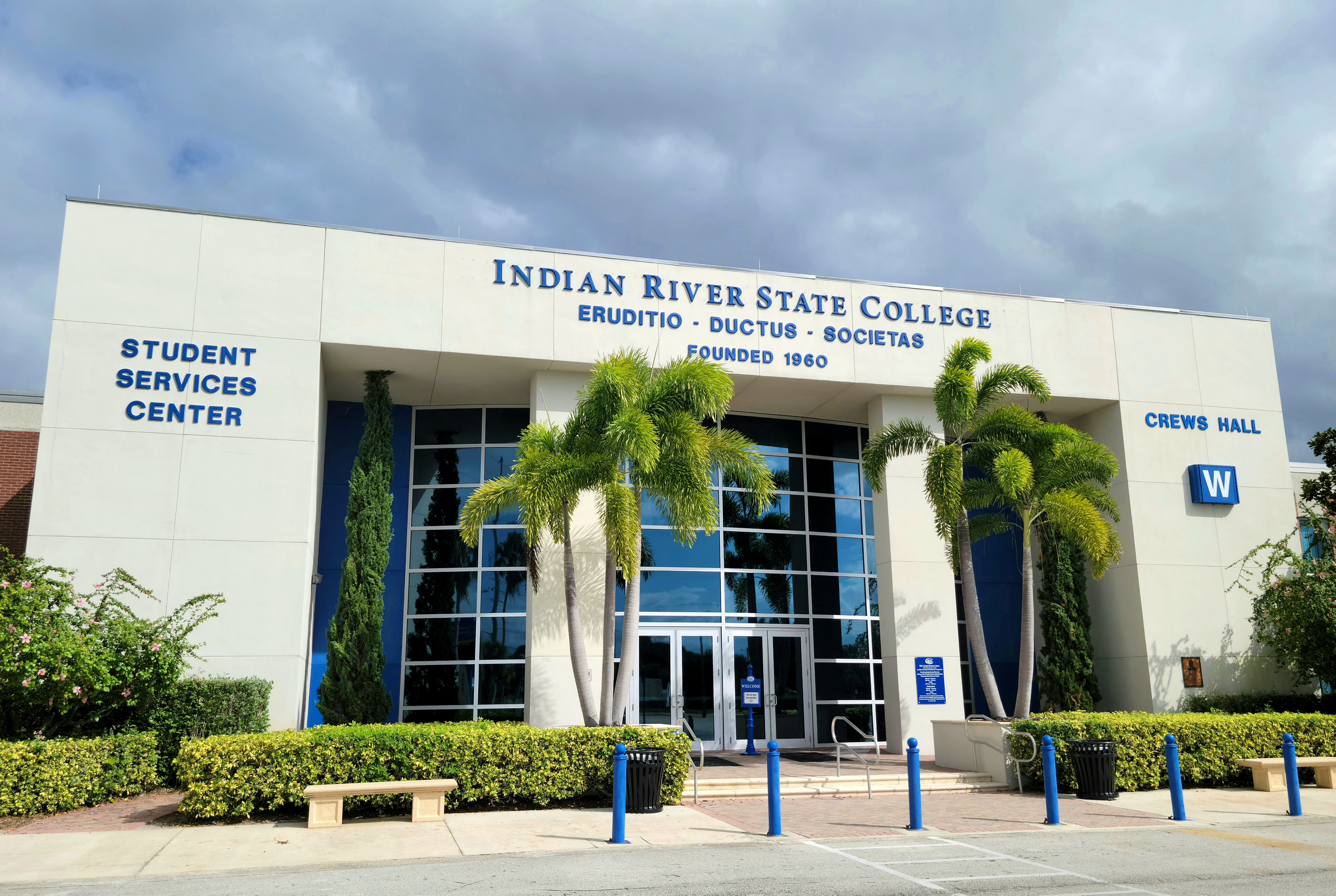
Crews Hall, Massey campus

The River offers associate and bachelor's degree programs across fields such as education, nursing, business, public safety, and healthcare management. The college also provides other programs including for technical certificates, applied technology diplomas, and dual enrollment options for high school students.

The River Online, launched in 2013, supports online learning. The college also operates the Clark Advanced Learning Center, a charter high school in collaboration with the Martin County School District. In 2022, The River introduced the Promise Program, offering local high school graduates full-time, tuition-free, enrollment to pursue an associate degree.

=== Admissions ===
The River has an open admission policy with few admission thresholds, admitting all applicants so long as certain minimum requirements are met. The River does not report high school GPA, SAT, or ACT data for admitted students.

=== Ranking ===
The River is unranked in Best Colleges – Regional Colleges South by U.S. News & World Report.

== Student life ==
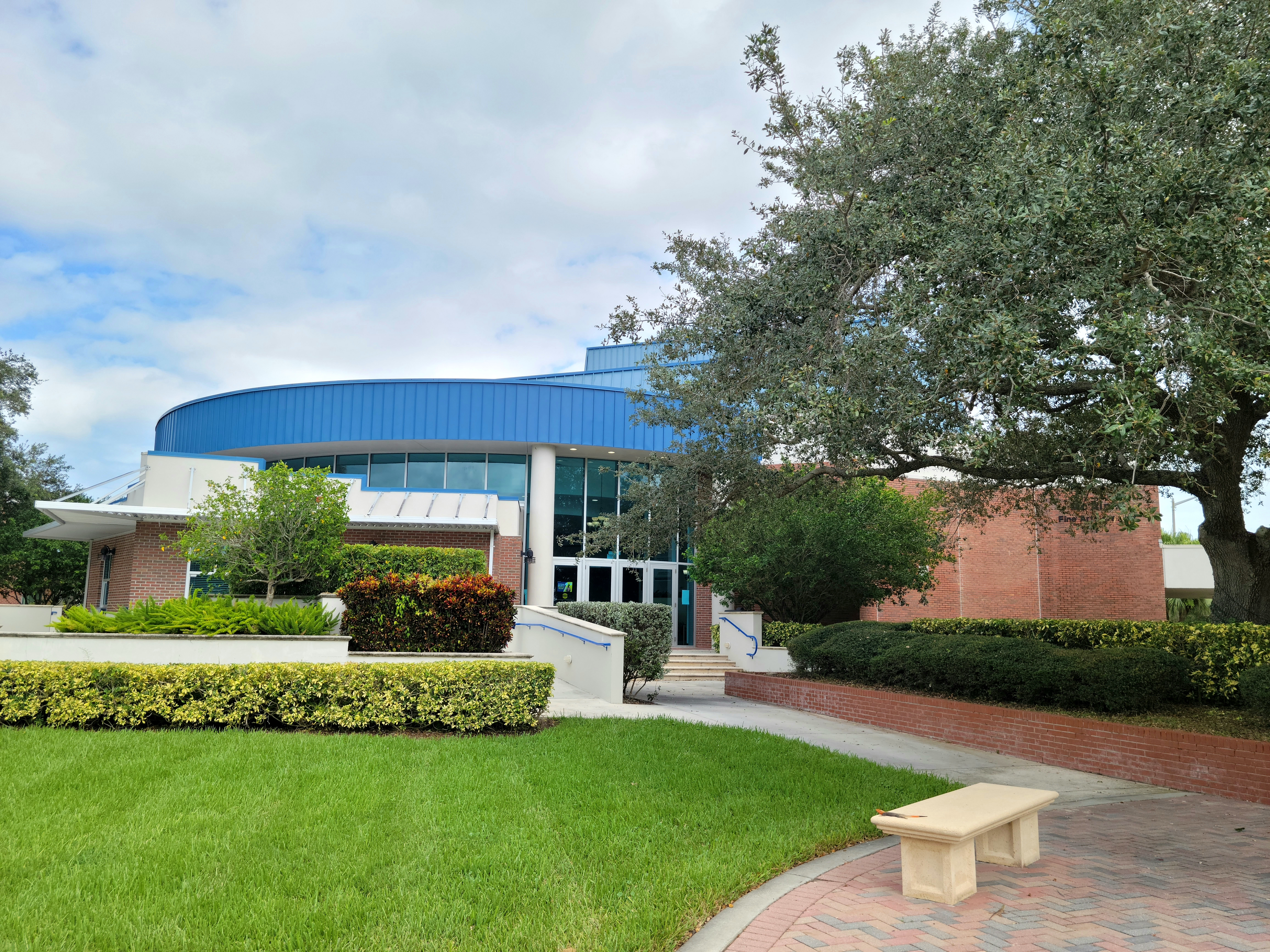
McAlpin Fine Arts Center, Massey campus

The River provides a wide range of clubs and activities. The college offers over 60 student clubs and organizations, contributing to a diverse array of social and leadership opportunities. Each year, The River hosts more than 1,600 student activities, fostering an engaging campus environment. The Student Government Association (SGA), which evolved from the Campus Coalition Government (CCG) in 2022, includes representatives from over 70 student groups and athletic teams, ensuring comprehensive student representation.

The River Hammock Student Housing complex provides on-campus living for students. This residence offers amenities including utilities and Wi-Fi, and features individual bedrooms, a central living area, and full kitchen facilities. On-campus resources are further supported by the River Shop bookstore, which supplies textbooks and academic materials, and the Cosmetology and Barbering Institute, where students receive discounted services performed by peers under supervision.

The River recognizes academic achievement and leadership through various honor societies, such as Phi Theta Kappa, Kappa Delta Pi, Sigma Beta Delta, Alpha Phi Sigma, and Eta Sigma Delta. These societies offer students opportunities to engage with professionals, participate in conferences, and compete for scholarships. The Emerging Leaders program at The River provides additional leadership development through events and seminars, awarding participants a certificate, leadership pin, and medallion upon completion.

=== Athletics ===
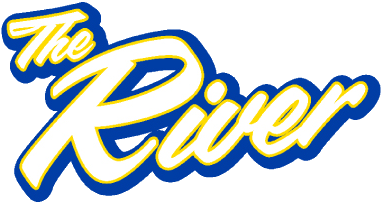
Indian River State athletics wordmark

The athletic teams of The River, known as the "Pioneers," compete in the Southern Conference of the Florida State College Activities Association (FSCAA). The college is best known for its swimming and diving programs, which have achieved success at the national level. As of 2024, the men's team holds 50 consecutive National Junior College Athletic Association (NJCAA) championships, while the women's team has won 46 national titles, marking the longest championship streak in U.S. collegiate sports history.

In addition to swimming and diving, The River offers competitive programs in men's baseball and basketball, and women's softball and volleyball, fostering both athletic and academic growth among student-athletes. However, in 2024, the college announced the discontinuation of its women's basketball program. This decision was influenced by financial concerns and the need to reallocate resources within the athletics department. The college cited a combination of budgetary constraints and the need for strategic adjustments as reasons for this significant change.

The college’s athletic facilities have undergone significant upgrades, including the completion of a new baseball and softball complex in 2023.

== Media ==
Logo of The River Public Media

Indian River State College, through its The River Public Media division, owns and operates three radio stations, each serving different audiences across the region. WQCS (88.9 FM), the flagship station, has been on air since 1982 and plays a key role in public broadcasting on the Treasure Coast. It serves as the primary NPR affiliate for the area, broadcasting news, public affairs, and cultural programming, offering both national and local content. WFLM (91.1 FM) features an urban adult contemporary format, with a mix of R&B, soul, and modern hits. WQCP (88.5 FM) is dedicated to classical music, providing a selection of orchestral, chamber, and solo performances.

== Notable alumni ==
- Mike Bianco, head coach of the University of Mississippi baseball team
- Sion Brinn, Olympic swimmer
- Emil Brown, professional baseball player
- Rob Cordemans, Olympic baseball player for the Netherlands
- Lacey Evans, professional wrestler
- Kason Gabbard, baseball coach and former professional baseball player
- Omar Mateen, perpetrator of the Pulse nightclub shooting
- John McCormack, college baseball coach at Florida Atlantic University
- Rusty Meacham, professional baseball player
- Breanna Myles, winner of Miss Teen USA 2021
- Ángel Pagán, professional baseball player
- Steve Pearce, professional baseball player
- Ralph Poppell, former member of the Florida House of Representatives
- Luke Scott, professional baseball player
- Cory Spangenberg, professional baseball player
- Gordon Touw Ngie Tjouw, Olympic swimmer
- Jonny Venters, professional baseball player
