= WQCP (FM) =

- Clewiston, Florida; United States
- Frequency: 88.5 MHz

Programming
- Format: Classical music

Ownership
- Owner: Indian River State College
- Sister stations: WFLM; WQCS

History
- First air date: July 16, 2001
- Former call signs: WJCB (2001–2021); WQJS (2021–2026)

Technical information
- Licensing authority: FCC
- Facility ID: 84098
- Class: A
- ERP: 3,000 watts
- HAAT: 89 meters (292 ft)
- Transmitter coordinates: 26°43′47.2″N 80°54′48.2″W
- Repeater: 90.5 WQCO (Okeechobee)

Links
- Public license information: Public file; LMS
- Webcast: Listen live
- Website: www.wqcs.org

WQCP is a radio station broadcasting a classical music format on 88.5 MHz FM in Clewiston, Florida, United States. It is owned and operated by Indian River State College, through its IRSC Public Media division, alongside two other stations: WQCS (88.9 FM) and WFLM (91.1 FM) in Fort Pierce. The WQCP programming is also heard on WQCS's HD Radio subchannel and on WQCO (90.5 FM) in Okeechobee.

== History ==
On July 13, 1998, Black Media Works, Inc., was granted a construction permit for a new radio station to serve Clewiston; a license to cover for WJCB was filed almost three years later, on July 12, 2001. It served to rebroadcast the programming of WJFP (the current WFLM) in Fort Pierce.

In August 2021, Indian River State College announced it had reached a deal to purchase WJFP and its Clewiston satellite WJCB to provide a second frequency and split NPR news/talk and classical music programming in the Fort Pierce area. On September 15, WJCB changed its call sign to WQJS. On the same day, at 8:00 a.m., classic hits 88.9 HD3 "The River" began simulcasting on 91.1 and 88.5 temporarily until WQCP relaunched with a new call sign on September 28. The purchase by Indian River State College of the two stations was consummated on September 27, 2021, for $950,000.

On December 4, 2023, WQJS changed its format from jazz to classical music. The call sign was changed to WQCP on June 16, 2026.
