= Stuart Training School =

High school in Martin County, Florida

Stuart Training School, in Stuart, Florida, was the high school for African Americans in Martin County, Florida during segregation. C.E. Murray was principal from 1925 to 1939. His brother Robert G. Murray was principal from 1945 to 1958. Its building at 800 SE Bahama Avenue, still in use by the School's successor, Spectrum Junior/Senior High School, opened in 1931.

Students "read second-hand books...that were discarded from their all-white counterparts at [Martin County High School]. They also wore secondhand basketball and football uniforms.... The students and their parents built the basketball court and sidewalks at the school without the help of the school board. 'We even put in wiring for lights along the sidewalk, but the school board never connected the electricity.'"

Stuart went out of existence in 1964. A new school for negroes, Carver Gardens Junior/Senior High School, renamed Murray Junior/Senior High in honor of the principals mentioned above, opened in Port Salerno.

In a 1989 naming contest, students picked the name Spectrum (Spectrum Junior/Senior High) as a synonym for "all-inclusive". However, by 2000 it was "marked for problem students who have had trouble attending mainstream schools"; it was "surrounded by tall chain-link fences". In 2009 a teacher described it as "a drop-out center". In 2019 it is the Spectrum Academy; its web site describes it as an "alternative secondary school for students who are seeking creative scheduling options that include full-time credit recovery and co-enrollment opportunities with the student’s home school." In 2016–17 there were 76 students and 7 teachers.

== Famous alumni ==
=== Stuart Training School ===
- Howard Porter, basketball player

=== Spectrum Academy ===
- Omar Mateen, islamic terrorist, mass murderer and perpetrator of the Orlando nightclub shooting
