= WFLM =

Radio station in Fort Pierce, Florida

- Fort Pierce, Florida; United States
- Broadcast area: Treasure Coast
- Frequency: 91.1 MHz
- Branding: Q-91.1 The Flame

Programming
- Format: Urban adult contemporary

Ownership
- Owner: Indian River State College
- Sister stations: WQCP; WQCS

History
- First air date: January 15, 1995 (as WJFP)
- Former call signs: WJFP (1995–2021); WQCP (2021–2026)
- Call sign meaning: Flame (former call sign of WPBB)

Technical information
- Licensing authority: FCC
- Facility ID: 5488
- Class: C1
- ERP: 85,000 watts (horizontal polarization); 82,000 watts (vertical polarization)
- HAAT: 140 meters (460 ft)
- Transmitter coordinates: 27°26′8.1″N 80°21′40.2″W
- Translator: See § translators

Links
- Public license information: Public file; LMS
- Webcast: Listen Live
- Website: www.wqcs.org/wqcp

WFLM (91.1 MHz) is a non-commercial FM radio station that broadcasts an urban adult contemporary format. It is licensed to Fort Pierce, Florida, and serves the Treasure Coast. It is part of IRSC Public Media, a division of Indian River State College, alongside two other stations: WQCS in Fort Pierce and WQJS in Clewiston.

== History ==
Black Media Works, Inc., launched this station as WJFP on January 15, 1995. Under Black Media Works, the station broadcast urban gospel music in the mornings and midday, with hip hop, R&B and urban contemporary music in the afternoons through late night. There was also a Sunday night block of specialty programs for the region's Haitian community. The original studios, a former bail bondsman's office in a converted house on Orange Avenue, until the owners wished to use it for their business again, at which time WJFP relocated across Fort Pierce to a site on US 1. Translators were also built to expand the station's signal to key areas with large Black and Haitian populations.

In August 2021, Indian River State College announced it had reached a deal to purchase WJFP and its Clewiston satellite WJCB to provide a second frequency and split NPR news/talk and classical music programming in the Fort Pierce area. On September 14, 2021, the final live show aired, the Drive Time Show with Jumpin' Joe, with guests on air and by phone including now-former station owner and president of Black Media Works Kim Kassis (Special K), DJ One Shot, Shaneiac, Melan from the T-Babby Radio Show, DJ T-Black, a few of the pastors from WJFP, and others. The final song on the show was "We Are The World," by USA For Africa.

On September 14, 2021, by 6:00 p.m., the live online stream was taken down and the translators in Brevard County on 94.3 FM and 93.9 FM had gone silent. The next day, music continued to play through the night with R&B, hip hop, pop, disco, oldies, jazz, and some Christian music, switching to gospel music from 5:00 a.m. until the final song aired just before 8:00 a.m.

On September 15 at 8:00 a.m., classic hits 88.9 HD3 "The River" began simulcasting on 91.1 and 88.5 temporarily until the new services launched with a new call sign on September 28. The programming on WQJS is heard in Fort Pierce on the HD2 subchannel of WQCS.

The purchase of the two stations by Indian River State College was consummated on September 27, 2021, at a price of $950,000.

On December 4, 2023, WQCP dropped its classical format for R&B-leaning Christmas music. The change appeared to be a stunt as the station was advertising that "The New 91.1 is coming soon." WQCP flipped to urban adult contemporary as "Q-91.1" on December 28, 2023. The call sign was changed to WFLM on June 10, 2026.

== Translators ==
Black Media Works owned two translators in Brevard County that previously rebroadcast this station. The Mangonia Park translator, covering West Palm Beach, switched program sources to a subchannel of WLLY-FM in 2018 and became its own station, "Yo 107.1".

Broadcast translator for WFLM
Call sign	Frequency	City of license	FID	ERP (W)	HAAT	Class	FCC info
W232AZ	94.3 FM	Melbourne, Florida	85913	120	43 m (141 ft)	D	LMS
W296AW	107.1 FM	Mangonia Park, Florida	82621	250	156 m (512 ft)	D	LMS
