= WLRN-FM =

Public radio station in Miami, Florida, U.S.

Coordinates: 25.980°N 80.196°W

WLRN-FM and WKWM

WLRN-FM: Miami, Florida; WKWM: Marathon, Florida; United States
- Broadcast area: South Florida metropolitan area and the Florida Keys
- Frequencies: WLRN-FM: 91.3 MHz (HD Radio); WKWM: 91.5 MHz (HD Radio)
- Branding: WLRN Radio

Programming
- Language(s): English
- Format: Public radio; news/talk; jazz
- Subchannels: WLRN-FM and WKWM: HD2: Classical music
- Affiliations: National Public Radio; Public Radio Exchange; American Public Media; BBC World Service

Ownership
- Owner: Miami-Dade County Public Schools
- Operator: Friends of WLRN
- Sister stations: WLRN-TV; WPBB

History
- First air date: WLRN-FM: 1949; WKWM: September 2008
- Call sign meaning: WLRN-FM: Learn; WKWM: Key West Marathon

Technical information
- Licensing authority: FCC
- Facility ID: WLRN-FM: 66339; WKWM: 122606
- Class: WLRN-FM: C1; WKWM: C3
- ERP: WLRN-FM: 47,000 watts; WKWM: 12,000 watts
- HAAT: WLRN-FM: 285 meters (935 ft); WKWM: 140.8 meters (462 ft)
- Translator(s): 89.1 W206AS (Big Pine Key); 93.3 W227AD (Key Colony Beach); 100.5 W263BO (Key West); 101.9 W270AD (West Palm Beach); 92.1 W221AY (Tavernier)
- Repeater(s): 104.7 WPBB (Palm Beach Shores); 105.5 WOLL-HD2 (Hobe Sound)

Links
- Public license information: WLRN-FM: Public file; LMS; WKWM: Public file; LMS
- Webcast: Listen live
- Website: www.wlrn.org/radio

WLRN-FM (91.3 FM) and WKWM (91.5 FM) are non-commercial, listener-supported, public radio stations for South Florida and the Florida Keys. WLRN-FM is licensed to Miami, Florida, United States, and WKWM is licensed to Marathon. They are owned by Miami-Dade County Public Schools. The offices and studios are at the ABM Telecommunications Center on Northeast 15th Street in Miami.

WLRN-FM is a Class C1 station and WKWM is Class C3. WLRN-FM's transmitter is off SW 52nd Avenue in Pembroke Park. WKWM's transmitter is off Route A1A in Ramrod Key. Programming is also heard on four FM translators in South Florida.

== Programming ==
WLRN-FM and WKWM are the flagship NPR member stations in South Florida. They air a news and information format during the day with jazz at night and the BBC World Service overnight. Weekday information shows include Morning Edition, All Things Considered, Fresh Air, 1A, Here and Now, The World and Marketplace. There are two weekday evening music programs: Radyo Lekol, a Haitian Creole show and Weeknight Jazz, which features traditional and contemporary jazz music.

Weekend specialty shows include Wait, Wait, Don't Tell Me, The Moth Radio Hour, The TED Radio Hour, The New Yorker Radio Hour, The Ezra Klein Show, Travel with Rick Steves, A Way with Words, Freakonomics Radio, Latino USA, Science Friday, Hidden Brain, Radiolab and This American Life.

== Translators and repeaters ==
As of 2022, WLRN-FM has three repeaters in the Florida Keys: 93.3 W227AD in Key Colony Beach, 89.1 W206AS in Big Pine Key, and 100.5 W263BO in Key West.

In late September 2008, WLRN launched a full-powered, class C3, 12 kW station, WKWM 91.5, in Marathon, Florida, which simulcasts WLRN programming for the southern Keys. This station broadcasts in HD Radio. WKWM has one repeater, 92.1 W221AY in Tavernier.

To serve the Palm Beaches of South Florida, WLRN-FM leases FM translator 101.9 W270AD in West Palm Beach. It has a power of 250 watts and is fed by an HD2 subchannel of 90.7 WFLV. The translator and HD2 subchannel are owned by the Educational Media Foundation (EMF).

== History ==
=== Early years ===
WLRN-FM signed on the air in 1949. Its original call sign was WTHS-FM and it broadcast on 91.7 MHz. It was powered at 5,000 watts, a fraction of its current output. It has always been owned by the Miami public school system, although in its early years, the holder of the license was The Board of Public Instruction of Dade County. The studios and offices were at 1410 NE 2nd Avenue.

The school board acquired Channel 17 in 1959. At first, WTHS-TV was mostly used for classroom instruction on school days. But it later became Miami's secondary PBS station as WLRN-TV.

In the 1960s, WTHS-FM moved to 91.3. The power increased slightly to 8,400 watts. The station became a charter member of NPR in 1970 and is the longest running NPR affiliate in Florida. WTHS-FM maintained a long-time radio reading service for the blind on an analog subcarrier.

In 1973, the stations changed their call letters to WLRN-FM-TV to represent the word "Learn". Employees of WLRN-FM-TV are part of AFSCME union local 1187.

In the late 1970s, WLRN-FM was given permission by the Federal Communications Commission to boost its power to 92,000 watts on its 400 foot tower. However, it chose to go on a taller antenna and run 47,000 watts as a Class C1 station.

=== HD Radio ===
WLRN-FM and WKWM broadcast using HD Radio technology. The HD2 digital subchannel was originally called "WLRN Xtra HD." It was known as "South Florida’s Alternative News and Talk Station", featuring talk programming by day and BBC World Service at night.

Until December 2, 2007, HD2 carried "Classical 24", which offered classical music 24 hours per day. Classical 24 later moved to another public radio station, WKCP (89.7 FM), after that station's acquisition by Classical 24's parent, American Public Media. But 89.7 was sold to EMF for its "K-Love" Christian contemporary music network on July 17, 2015. Classical music returned to WLRN's HD2 subchannel on August 10, 2015. It once again uses the "Classical 24" network but is now referred to as "WLRN Classical HD2".

=== The Palm Beaches ===
On October 16, 2015, WLRN-FM announced it would lease the HD2 subchannel of WFLV in West Palm Beach and its FM translator 101.9 W270AD from EMF. The subchannel and translator would simulcast WLRN-FM in the region as "101.9, NPR For The Palm Beaches". Until then, listeners in the Palm Beach area had to try pulling in WLRN-FM from its main transmitter in Pembroke Pines, quite distant for an FM signal to reach.

The translator on 101.9 MHz began airing WLRN-FM programming in November 2015. Other than W270AD, there was no NPR affiliate on the Florida Coast between Miami and Orlando. In 1982, a new NPR station signed on in Fort Pierce, WQCS, owned by Indian River State College. But its transmitter is distant from the Palm Beaches as well.

Although 101.9 W270AD's programming is produced by WLRN-FM, it airs a slightly different schedule from WLRN-FM's main signal. On weekday evenings, it does not air Radyo Lekol (Creole-language program produced by MDCPS; weeknights from 9:00-9:30pm) or Evening Jazz (weeknights from 9:30pm–1:00am). Programming from the BBC World Service airs instead.

=== Controversy ===
In June 2011, WLRN dropped ties with the Florida Public Radio Network, the statewide network of public radio stations designed to provide coverage of the Florida Legislature and other Florida-relevant issues. This was partly in response to its producer, WFSU-FM in Tallahassee, receiving $2.8 million in funding for various services related to Florida government, including $497,522 for "statewide government and cultural affairs programming", which includes the Florida Public Radio Network.

This is despite the $4.8 million of funding to other public radio and television stations (including WLRN radio and television) vetoed by Governor Rick Scott in May 2011. In its place, WLRN-FM signed on to a joint partnership between the Tampa Bay Times and The Miami Herald in coverage of state issues from the papers' Tallahassee bureau.
