= WQCS =

Radio station in Fort Pierce, Florida, U.S.

Coordinates: 27.422°N 80.356°W

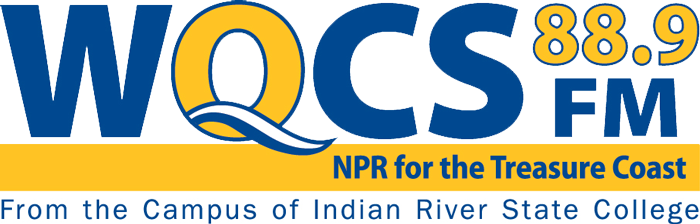
- Fort Pierce, Florida; United States
- Broadcast area: Treasure Coast
- Frequency: 88.9 MHz (HD Radio)
- Branding: WQCS 88.9 FM NPR for the Treasure Coast

Programming
- Language: English
- Format: Public radio and talk
- Subchannels: HD2: Classical music; HD3: Classic hits
- Affiliations: NPR; PRX; APM; BBC World Service

Ownership
- Owner: Indian River State College
- Sister stations: WFLM; WQCP

History
- First air date: April 1982

Technical information
- Licensing authority: FCC
- Facility ID: 28545
- Class: C1
- ERP: 100,000 watts
- HAAT: 133 meters (436 ft)

Links
- Public license information: Public file; LMS
- Webcast: Listen live
- Website: www.wqcs.org

WQCS (88.9 FM) is a noncommercial educational radio station licensed to Fort Pierce, Florida, United States, serving the Treasure Coast as a National Public Radio (NPR) member station. It is owned by Indian River State College, with studios in Building Q of the college's main campus in Fort Pierce.

WQCS's transmitter is sited on the Indian River State College Campus in Fort Pierce, on South 30th Street at Cross Campus Road. WQCS broadcasts in HD Radio; on its HD2 digital subchannel, it offers classical music as "QCS Classic", while on HD3, it plays classic hits as "IRSC River Radio".

== History ==
The station signed on the air in April 1982. It originally broadcast at 88.3 FM, and was powered at 3,000 watts, a fraction of its current output. It had studios in the McAlpin Fine Arts Center. Phil Scott was the first station manager.

Four years later, it boosted its power to 100,000 watts, more than tripling its coverage area in the process. That was coupled with a move to its current dial position at 88.9 FM. The format is a mix of news and NPR talk programming.

== Programming ==
WQCS carries programs from NPR and other public radio networks. On weekdays, shows include: All Things Considered, Morning Edition, Fresh Air, 1A and Here and Now. Frequent news updates come from NPR and the WQCS news department. The BBC World Service runs all night.

On weekends, specialty shows are heard, including: This American Life, On The Media, Travel with Rick Steves, The TED Radio Hour, Big Picture Science, A Way with Words, Science Friday, Splendid Table, Radiolab, The Moth Radio Hour, Freakonomics Radio, The New Yorker Radio Hour, To the Best of Our Knowledge, Live Wire, Selected Shorts and Wait, Wait, Don't Tell Me. A weekly local interview program "River Talk" airs twice each weekend.

== Gallery ==
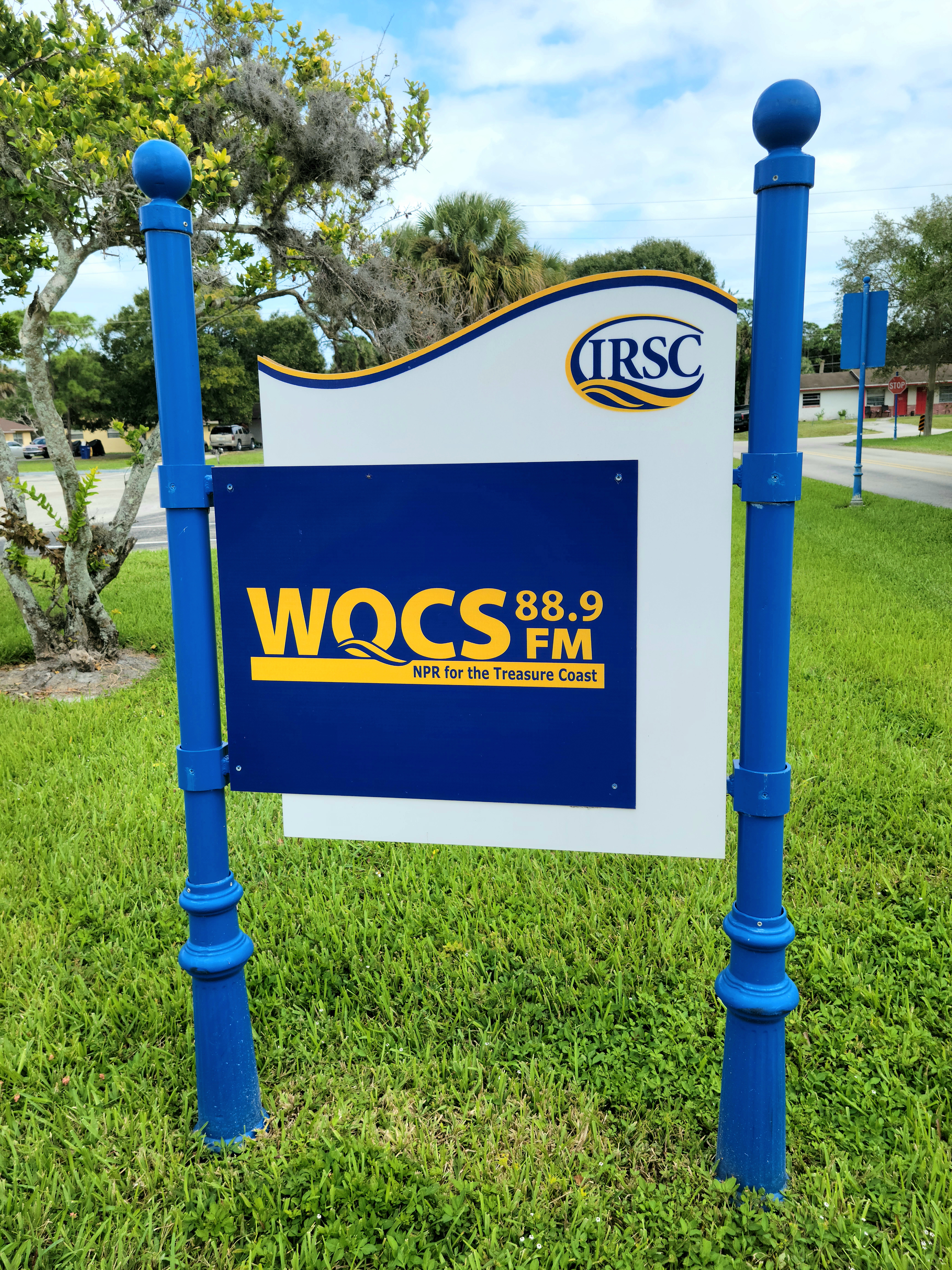
WQCS 88.9 FM Signage

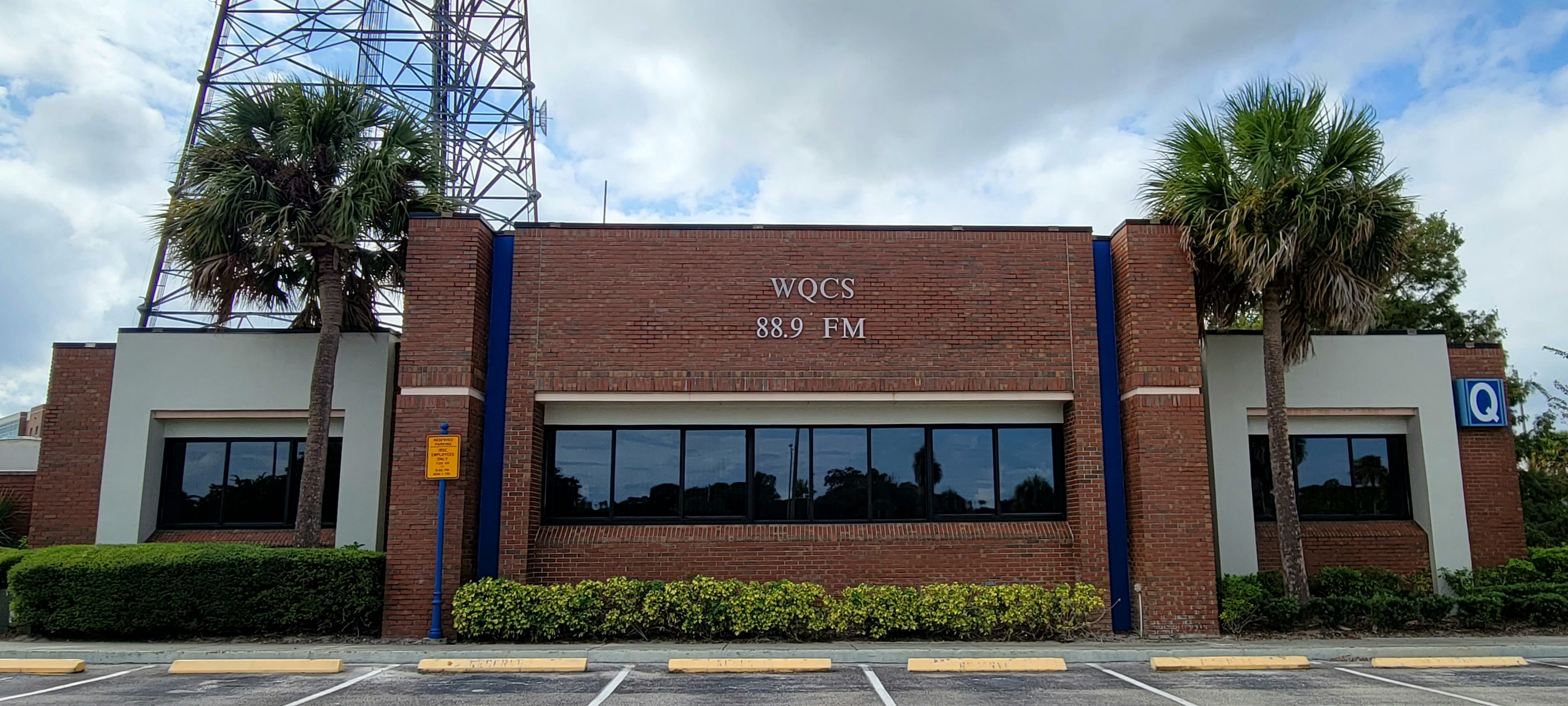
WQCS 88.9 FM Building

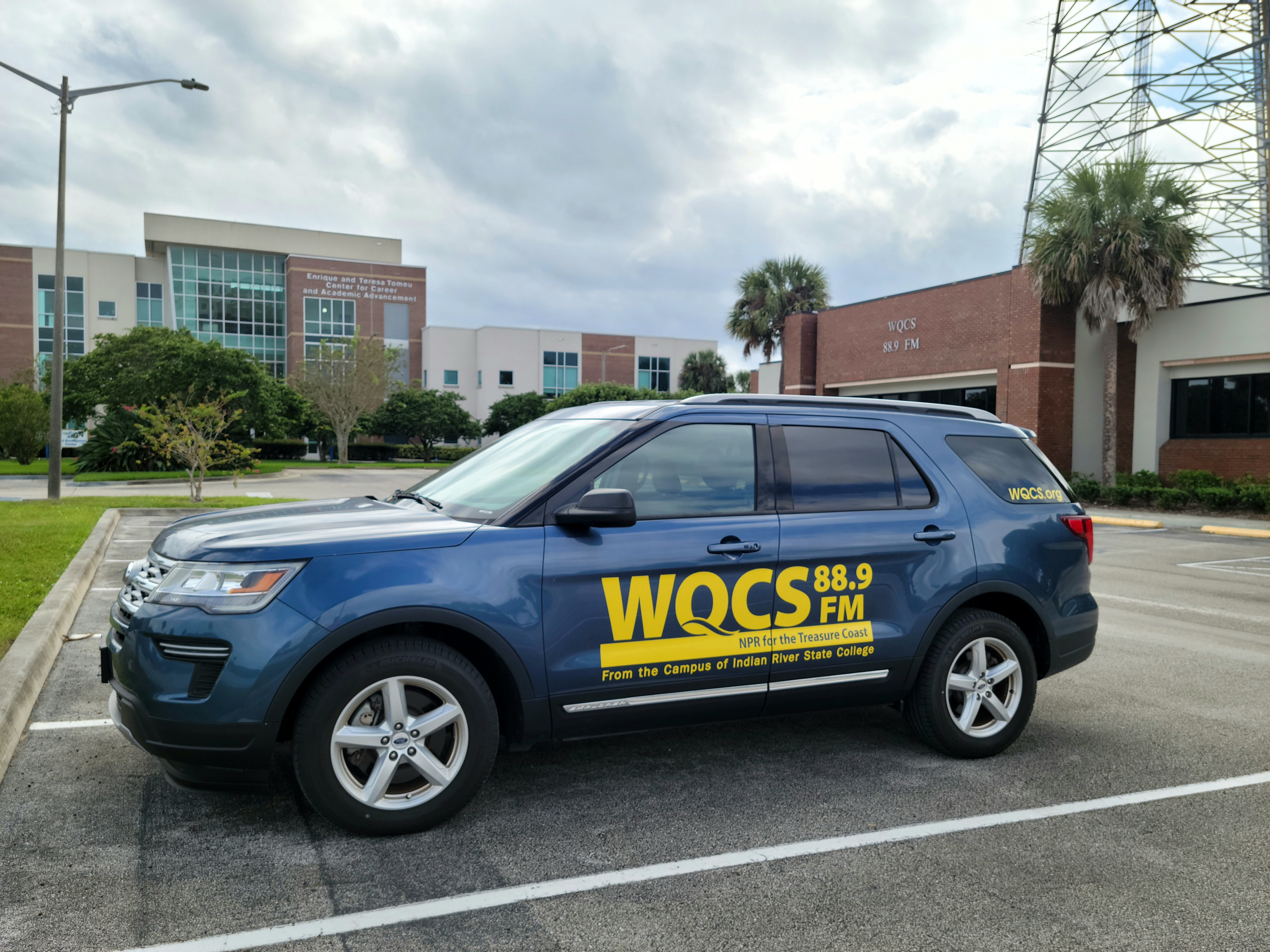
SUV parked in front of the facility
