= WPBB =

Radio station in Palm Beach Shores, Florida

Simulcast of WLRN-FM, Miami and WKWM, Marathon
- Palm Beach Shores, Florida; United States
- Broadcast area: West Palm Beach, Florida
- Frequency: 104.7 MHz (HD Radio)
- Branding: WLRN Radio

Programming
- Language: English
- Format: Public radio; news/talk; jazz
- Subchannels: HD2: Classical music
- Affiliations: National Public Radio; Public Radio Exchange; American Public Media; BBC World Service

Ownership
- Owner: South Florida Public Media Group, Inc.
- Operator: Friends of WLRN
- Sister stations: WLRN-FM; WLRN-TV

History
- First air date: 1994
- Former call signs: WFLM (1993–2026)
- Former frequencies: 104.7 MHz (1994–2016); 104.5 MHz (2016–2023)
- Call sign meaning: Palm Beach Broadcasting

Technical information
- Licensing authority: FCC
- Facility ID: 42065
- Class: C2
- ERP: 50,000 watts
- HAAT: 113 meters (371 ft)
- Transmitter coordinates: 27°25′16″N 80°21′25″W
- Repeater: 105.5 WOLL-HD2 (Hobe Sound)

Links
- Public license information: Public file; LMS
- Webcast: Listen live
- Website: www.wlrn.org/radio

WPBB (104.7 FM) is a non-commercial, listener-supported, public radio station licensed to Palm Beach Shores, Florida, by South Florida Public Media Group, Inc. The station serves the West Palm Beach radio market. The transmitter is off of Hill Avenue in West Palm Beach.

== History ==
On August 27, 2013, WFLM applied for a frequency change from 104.7 to 104.5 MHz and an upgrade from C3 at 17.5 kW to C2 at 50 kW. The license for this change was issued on February 17, 2016. Effective December 13, 2023, WFLM was licensed to move from White City to Palm Beach Shores, Florida, and from 104.5 MHz back to 104.7. It also shifted to a more urban contemporary presentation.

On June 6, 2025, South Florida Public Media Group (SFPMG), operator of public media outlet WLRN-FM, announced that it would purchase WFLM from JDD Radio for $6.45 million and convert the station’s status to non-commercial to simulcast WLRN. On July 10, it was reported that the purchase was being challenged by the Miami-Dade County Public Schools board, the licensee of WLRN, which argued that all of SFPMG's fundraising proceeds could only be used to operate the board's stations, and not to acquire other stations. In May 2026, SFPMG and Miami-Dade Schools reached a settlement, under which SFPMG would immediately resell the WFLM license to the school board for the nominal value of $1, but continue to manage the station. The simulcast of WLRN-FM began on June 11, 2026, with the call letters changing to WPBB.
