= WLRN-TV =

Television station in Miami

- Miami–Fort Lauderdale, Florida; United States
- City: Miami, Florida
- Channels: Digital: 26 (UHF); Virtual: 17
- Branding: WLRN; WLRN Public Television

Programming
- Affiliations: 17.1: PBS

Ownership
- Owner: Miami-Dade County Public Schools; (The School Board of Miami-Dade County, Florida)
- Operator: Friends of WLRN
- Sister stations: WLRN-FM; WPBB

History
- First air date: September 7, 1962
- Former call signs: WSEC-TV (1962–1973)
- Former channel numbers: Analog: 17 (UHF, 1962–2009); Digital: 20 (UHF, 2003–2019)
- Former affiliations: NET (1962–1970)
- Call sign meaning: "Learn"

Technical information
- Licensing authority: FCC
- Facility ID: 66358
- ERP: 1,000 kW
- HAAT: 301.7 m (989.8 ft)
- Transmitter coordinates: 25°58′47″N 80°11′45″W

Links
- Public license information: Public file; LMS
- Website: www.wlrn.org

WLRN-TV (channel 17) is a secondary PBS member television station in Miami, Florida, United States. It is owned by the Miami-Dade County Public Schools district alongside NPR member WLRN-FM 91.3; the two outlets are operated under a management agreement by Friends of WLRN, the stations' fundraising arm. WLRN-TV and WLRN-FM share studios at the ABM Telecommunications Center on Northeast 15th Street and 1st Avenue in Miami and transmitter facilities on Southwest 52nd Avenue in Pembroke Park, Florida.

WLRN-TV is one of two PBS member stations serving the Miami–Fort Lauderdale market, the other being WPBT (channel 2), owned by South Florida PBS. Originally a secondary station to channel 2 when it was WTHS-TV, the effective split of community and public licensees in the late 1970s made channel 17 the only TV station operated by the school system. WLRN-TV's local productions include documentaries and special-interest programs on South Florida, and it also airs independently produced Spanish-language programs on Sundays.

== History ==
=== Early years ===
In 1959, the Dade County school board purchased a transmission facility in Hallandale that had last been used by WITV, a one-time ABC affiliate that had broadcast from 1954 to 1958, struggling through the launch of VHF television stations that took away its network programming and economic viability. After making the $200,000 acquisition, the school board received an exemption to use the site, five miles (8 km) too close to Daytona Beach's channel 2 station (WESH) otherwise, to relocate WTHS-TV, its educational station, from a facility in Miami. The project would expand the reach of the station, which had previously been limited to Dade County since its 1955 sign-on, to include areas in Broward and Palm Beach counties. To support the heavier channel 2 antenna, the tower height was reduced from 1,049 feet (320 m) to 700 feet (210 m).

For the school board, it was a trivial task from a facilities standpoint to reactivate channel 17: WTHS-TV already had studios, and it had just purchased the old WITV plant. In June 1960, it authorized its attorneys to prosecute a plan to reactivate channel 17 for educational use. This application was designated for hearing by the Federal Communications Commission (FCC), along with the license renewal for WITV, in 1961. An FCC hearing examiner sided with the school board, and the channel was shifted from Fort Lauderdale to Miami and reserved for non-commercial use so that the school board could use the same Miami studios for both facilities.

Operations of WSEC-TV began with program tests on June 26, 1962, with several high school courses moving over from WTHS-TV and sets in the schools being fitted with UHF converters. This allowed the WTHS-TV programs to be aimed at elementary and junior high school students.

In 1973, the call sign was changed to the present WLRN-TV, but channel 17 continued to be dedicated to use by the schools with little public recognition. The station cost just $60,000 a year to operate. A 1976 column by Sherry Woods, radio and TV editor for The Miami News, referred to it as "Channel What?" and noted that "few viewers outside of those in Dade County classrooms even know of its existence"; that year, it began its first effort at evening programming, a nightly variety show titled Something on Seventeen.

=== Out of obscurity ===
While channel 17 kept broadcasting to an audience that almost exclusively consisted of students, channel 2 had emerged as the primary public broadcasting outlet in South Florida. Long a joint effort between the school board and the private Community Television Foundation of South Florida (CTF), this arrangement was consecrated as two separate FCC licenses sharing the channel in 1970. WTHS-TV continued to broadcast during weekday daytime hours to provide in-school programs, while non-school fare was provided by the foundation under the new call sign of WPBT. The stated intention was to sunset WTHS-TV after five years and transition its broadcasts to a closed-circuit system connecting the schools, ceding channel 2 to WPBT full-time.

The arrangement went sour in 1975, when CTF sought to take full control. However, the school board refused, stating that WLRN-TV and other services were not yet available to a majority of students. The inadequate WLRN-TV facilities were cited by one school board member as a poor compensation for giving up half of channel 2; by 1978, the station was operating at an effective radiated power of 38,000 watts, using a transmitter it had acquired from WHRO-TV in Hampton, Virginia, in 1961. However, relief was on the way in the form of a major signal upgrade to WLRN-TV. In August 1978, a rebuilt facility was activated and effective radiated power increased to 2.83 million watts, extending the station's city-grade coverage to take in Cutler Ridge to the south and Boca Raton to the north. In addition to Something on Seventeen and educational courses for schools and the general public, the station also aired local government meetings.

In 1983, WLRN radio and television moved from the decaying Lindsey Hopkins High School building, where radio had been since 1948 and where television operations of the district began in 1955, to a new facility on the same site. By 1985, the station was producing a panoply of local shows to supplement PBS productions, ranging from panel discussions on public issues to sewing advice and how-tos on acting, as well as high school sports telecasts. When an appeals court ruling that year struck down FCC regulations requiring must-carry carriage of all TV stations in a local area, two Miami cable systems with 70,000 subscribers pulled WLRN. The station boasted, in response to it being dropped by a system in Fort Lauderdale, that its local programming output was only surpassed by WGBH-TV in Boston. The high school sports broadcasts were dropped in 1993, while school board meeting coverage on television was also curtailed to end at 6 p.m. even if the meeting was still in progress.

=== Friends of WLRN management ===
In 2017, a proposal to shift some news staffers from being employed by an independent nonprofit to directly by the school district led to controversy. A task force convened by the school board to determine the WLRN stations' future suggested four options, including restructuring the advisory board, spinning off WLRN radio and television, or selling them to another entity. The district opted to take proposals to outsource management while continuing to own the stations, receiving two bids. One came from Friends of WLRN, which had been established to provide fundraising support to the stations in 1974. The other came from South Florida PBS, the umbrella organization owning WPBT. The school district recommended the South Florida PBS bid, but after Friends of WLRN challenged the decision in court, a vote on the topic was postponed.

After the onset of the COVID-19 pandemic, South Florida PBS withdrew its bid in April 2020. A final agreement for Friends of WLRN to run the stations was reached in February 2022. The deal was also reached in the context of superintendent Alberto M. Carvalho leaving Miami to run the Los Angeles Unified School District.

== Local programming ==
In addition to airing PBS programs and daily children's programming, WLRN-TV specializes in the production of local interest programs as well as documentaries which are syndicated for national distribution, making available 30 such shows to PBS stations since 2005. For four hours on Sunday afternoons, WLRN presents Spanish-language programming from independent producers.

== Technical information ==
WLRN broadcasts one channel of programming. Its transmitter is located on Southwest 52nd Avenue in Pembroke Park, Florida.

Subchannel of WLRN-TV
Subchannel	Res.	Short name	Programming
17.1	1080i	WLRN-HD	PBS

=== Analog-to-digital conversion ===
WLRN-TV shut down its analog signal, over UHF channel 17, on June 12, 2009, as part of the federally mandated transition from analog to digital television. The station's digital signal remained on its pre-transition UHF channel 20; it was then repacked to channel 26 a decade later.
