= WFYY =

- Windermere, Florida; United States
- Broadcast area: Greater Orlando
- Frequency: 103.1 MHz (HD Radio)
- Branding: Kaliente 103.1

Programming
- Language: Spanish
- Format: Tropical music
- Subchannels: HD2: Suave 105.5 (Spanish adult contemporary); HD3: WDYZ simulcast (Regional Mexican)

Ownership
- Owner: Norsan Media; (Norsan Media, LLC)
- Sister stations: WDYZ

History
- First air date: February 1966; 60 years ago
- Former call signs: WLOQ (1965–2011); WHKQ (2011–2014); WOTW (2014–2022)
- Call sign meaning: "Fly" (former branding)

Technical information
- Licensing authority: FCC
- Facility ID: 25403
- Class: C2
- ERP: 22,000 watts
- HAAT: 227 meters (745 ft)
- Translator: HD2: 105.5 W288CJ (Oviedo)

Links
- Public license information: Public file; LMS
- Website: kaliente1031.com suave1055.com (HD2)

WFYY (103.1 FM) is a commercial radio station licensed to Windermere, Florida, and serving Greater Orlando. The station is owned by Norsan Media, and airs a tropical music format. Its language is Spanish.

The studios and offices are on Lucien Way in Maitland. The transmitter is on West Story Road in Winter Garden, at Veterans Memorial Park.

WFYY broadcasts in the HD Radio format; its HD2 subchannel carries a Spanish adult contemporary format, which is rebroadcast on FM translator W288CJ, at 105.5 MHz, while their HD3 subchannel simulcasts sister station WDYZ, which carries a regional Mexican format.

== History ==
=== Smooth jazz as WLOQ ===
In February 1966, the station first signed on as WLOQ. Its original city of license was Winter Park. The station's effective radiated power was 3,000 watts, a fraction of its current output. It was housed in the Langford Hotel. For its first couple of decades, WLOQ aired a middle of the road and easy listening format. In 1977, Gross Communications, headed by Herbert P. Gross, bought WLOQ. Herbert Gross later passed control of the station onto his son, John.

Through the 1990s and 2000s, WLOQ was a smooth jazz station. As the large national radio companies bought most of the major stations in the region, WLOQ was the last independently owned FM radio station in Greater Orlando; in 2011, CEO John Gross decided to retire for medical reasons and put WLOQ up for sale.

=== Spanish CHR as WHKQ ===
In 2011, WLOQ was sold to the TTB Media Corporation. At midnight on August 1 that year, WLOQ signed off after 35 years with "What a Wonderful World" by Louis Armstrong, and WLOQ's smooth jazz format moved exclusively online. The station then began stunting with an all-Elvis Presley format as "Elvis 103.1". On August 3, at 9 pm, the station flipped to Spanish contemporary hit radio as "KQ103", launching with 20,000 songs in a row.

On August 1, 2011, WLOQ changed its call sign to WHKQ. The WLOQ branding and smooth jazz format continued as an internet radio station, at WLOQRadio.com. The WLOQ branding was revived in August 2011, on an FM translator, W273CA (102.5 FM) in Orlando, simulcast from the HD Radio signal of WMGF, owned by iHeartMedia. Eventually, iHeart ended the smooth jazz format on the translator, although it continues on WMGF's HD2 signal and online.

=== Country as WOTW ===
On September 5, 2014, JVC Media, a New York-based broadcasting company that has been expanding its portfolio of radio properties in Florida, acquired WHKQ from TTB. That same month, two websites were registered possibly showing JVC, upon closing the sale, may flip WHKQ to country music as My Country 103.1 to go up against longtime country leader WWKA, owned by Cox Radio. Other websites registered showed WHKQ possibly flipping to dance music as Party 103.1. JVC also requested to change the station's call letters to WOTW.

JVC's purchase of WHKQ was consummated on December 15, at a price of $10 million. That night, at midnight, after on-air staff members bid farewell and began redirecting listeners to tropical music-formatted WRUM, WHKQ began stunting with simulcasts of other stations owned by JVC. The new WOTW call letters took effect on December 16. On December 19, at noon, the stunting switched to sounds of a radio static, a heartbeat, and wolves howling. At 1:03 pm that day, the station officially flipped to country as 103.1 The Wolf. The first song on WOTW was "My Kinda Party" by Jason Aldean, the first of 10,000 songs in a row to launch the format.

In May 2017, JVC announced that WOTW would activate its HD Radio signal, signing on an HD2 sub-channel to air a mainstream rock format, branded as Bud 94.1 (in reference to recently acquired translator W231CT, which had previously simulcast WRSO). The sub-channel/translator signed on at 5:15 pm on July 13. On September 30, 2019, W231CT was acquired by iHeartMedia and began to simulcast WFLF. Bud 94.1 was rebranded Bud FM and still continued to be available on the HD2 subchannel until 2022.

=== Rhythmic contemporary as WFYY ===
On July 25, 2022, it was reported that JVC applied to change WOTW's call letters to WFYY effective August 1, signaling a possible format change coming for the station. Multiple domains were registered for the station back in late June, including some with the branding of "Fly 103.1", suggesting a rhythmic-based format under that name, especially as new JVC Florida Director of Programming Stevie DeMann had spent much of his career in the format, previously programming WPYO and WJHM in Orlando. On July 29, at midnight, after playing "The Cowboy Rides Away" by George Strait, WOTW dropped the country format and began stunting with a loop of "Jam on It" by Newcleus, the song choice most likely a tribute to the longtime branding of WJHM, while promoting a change to come on August 1, at noon. On July 30, the stunting shifted to a loop of songs containing the word "Party" in their titles, and on July 31, it shifted to a loop of songs with the word "Power" in their titles; both were similarly a tribute to the previous brands of WPYO. On August 1, at midnight, the playlist shifted to songs with the word "Fly" in their titles, and the new WFYY callsign went into effect. At the promised time, the station flipped to a rhythmic-leaning Top 40/CHR format as "Fly 103.1", with "First Class" by Jack Harlow being the first song played. WFYY competed with WXXL in their format. In September 2022, the country format and "The Wolf" branding returned on the station's HD2 subchannel and on streaming, replacing "Bud FM".

=== Florida Man Radio ===
Despite its efforts, WFYY ultimately failed to capture the former listeners of WJHM or WPYO, carrying just a 1.3 rating in the January 2024 Nielsen Audio market ratings; while it tied with translator-fed rival W283AN/WTKS-HD2, it would ultimately be too little, too late for the format.

On February 28, 2024, JVC announced that WFYY would assume the hot talk format heard on its HD3 subchannel and on translator W288CJ (105.5 FM) as "Florida Man Radio" beginning the following Monday, March 4. The "Fly" airstaff would be released with the move.

=== Sale to Norsan Media ===
Just three months after the flip to "Florida Man", JVC announced on June 13, that it would sell their Orlando stations, including WFYY, to Norsan Media for an undisclosed amount, which was later revealed to be $6 million. The station will flip to a Spanish-language format upon the sale closure, as Norsan focuses on such formats on their stations nationwide. The following day at 6 pm, after airing The Shannon Burke Show, WFYY and its sister station WDYZ began airing programming from the new owners 3 days before the LMA deal was supposed to start the following Monday, the 17th. The station was rumored to launch its new radio format under the "Latina 103.1" branding. The sale was finalized on August 30. The station did not officially launch its new Spanish tropical radio format as "Kaliente 103.1" until October 1.
