= WOMX-FM =

Radio station in Orlando, Florida

- Orlando, Florida; United States
- Broadcast area: Greater Orlando; Central Florida
- Frequency: 105.1 MHz (HD Radio)
- Branding: Mix 105.1

Programming
- Language: English
- Format: Hot adult contemporary
- Subchannels: HD2: Channel Q

Ownership
- Owner: Audacy, Inc.; (Audacy License, LLC)
- Sister stations: WOCL; WJHM

History
- First air date: August 15, 1967; 58 years ago
- Former call signs: WWQS (1967–1973); WBJW-FM (1973–1989)
- Call sign meaning: "Orlando's Mix"

Technical information
- Licensing authority: FCC
- Facility ID: 47746
- Class: C
- ERP: 100,000 watts
- HAAT: 487 meters (1,598 ft)
- Transmitter coordinates: 28.581°N 81.075°W

Links
- Public license information: Public file; LMS
- Webcast: Listen live (via Audacy)
- Website: www.audacy.com/mix1051

WOMX-FM (105.1 MHz) is a commercial radio station licensed to Orlando, Florida. The station is owned by Audacy, Inc. and airs a hot adult contemporary radio format known as Mix 105.1. WOMX-FM's studios and offices are located on Pembrook Drive in Maitland and its transmitter tower is off Fort Christmas Road in Bithlo.

WOMX-FM operates with 100,000 watts.

== History ==
The station first signed on the air on August 15, 1967, as WWQS. It was co-owned with WVCF (1480 AM) in Windermere. In 1973, American Homes Stations sold WWQS to Rounsaville Radio, owner of WBJW (1440 AM) in Winter Park, which changed the call letters to WBJW-FM, with the FM as a contemporary hits station, branded BJ105, and the AM airing an easy listening format. 105.1 was sold to Nationwide Communications in 1982, then Omni American and then to Shamrock Broadcasting in 1996, Chancellor Media in 1997 (which would subsequently merge with AMFM and then Clear Channel), then to Infinity Radio (CBS) in 2000. On February 2, 2017, CBS Radio announced it would merge with Entercom. The merger was approved on November 9, 2017, and was consummated on November 17.

The station became WOMX-FM on September 14, 1989. (WOMX was formerly the call sign for a Coast Guard ship based in Biloxi, Mississippi.) Initially, Mix 105.1's format was characterized as "Adult Top 40", but was quickly modified to a slightly more mature "Hot Adult Contemporary" sound, with a greater emphasis on hits from the past two decades.

The station signed on with Mike Elliot and Beth Ann Schaffer in mornings, Tracey Young in middays, Dave Kelly in afternoons, and Nick Sanders ("Nick At Night") in the evening slot. Overnights were hosted by Keith Summers. The station was first programmed by Brian Thomas, later the Program Director of WCBS-FM in New York City. In late 1990, the station launched Scott and Erica in the Morning, with Scott McKenzie and Erica Lee, after Mike Elliott left for a job in Tampa.

Longtime morning show co-host Erica Lee was let go on January 7, 2010, after 19 years at WOMX-FM. Scott remained as the anchor and face of WOMX-FM's morning show, joined by Dana Taylor and Jay Edwards. Following a move to more rhythmic content on CBS Radio-owned hot AC stations (WBMX Boston, WQAL Cleveland and WTIC-FM Hartford), WOMX-FM began adding more rhythmic music to go up against Top 40 station WXXL, owned by Clear Channel Communications (now iHeart). Ratings went up for WOMX-FM after the playlist tweak, which also caused rival soft adult contemporary station WMGF to phase in more hot AC content.

WOMX-FM is the oldest hot adult contemporary in Florida under CBS Radio/Entercom/Audacy ownership, while CBS Radio's other hot ACs (WHFS-FM Tampa and WPBZ West Palm Beach) had the format since 2010 and 2011, respectively. As of July 2014, those stations have switched formats, with WHFS-FM flipping to sports radio (as well as being sold to Beasley Broadcast Group), and WPBZ sold to a new owner and flipping to country music. That made WOMX-FM not only the oldest Hot AC station in Florida under CBS Radio/Entercom/Audacy ownership, but once again, CBS Radio's only Florida Hot AC station.

Morning host Scott McKenzie died on August 11, 2015, at the age of 59 after suffering from non-Hodgkin lymphoma for seven years. As of September 2023, mornings are now hosted by Danny Serrano.

In early 2020, older songs from the 2000s and 2010s were added back to the playlist, as well as select 1990s tracks that don't overlap with sister station WOCL.

Jay Edwards announced his departure from the station in mid-November 2021. He subsequently joined Cox Media Group's Orlando cluster as an on-air producer and host of talk radio station WDBO, country radio station WWKA, and classic rock station WMMO.

Dana Taylor left the station on January 13, 2023; she had been with WOMX since 1994.

In March 2023, Clint “CJ” Robinson returned after a 2-year hiatus to host afternoons. He previously hosted middays from 2012-2015, then afternoons from 2015-2020, and again from 2023-2024. He was elevated to Assistant Brand Manager in early 2024.

On June 21, 2024, it was announced that Danny Serrano, who was a morning host at the station (the morning show was known as "Mix Mornings with Danny Serrano"), exited after a little over a year on the station. Before being employed at WOMX-FM and Audacy, he was the assistant program director and afternoon host of Tampa radio station WPOI (now WTBV) from 2017 until mid-2023. His morning show slot ended up being filled in by Jess Bonilla as a result.

On July 26, 2024, it was announced that the “Mix Mornings” morning show would be relaunched starting on Monday, July 29, with Jenn Lopez and Clint “CJ” Robinson hosting, with Robinson moving from hosting afternoons. As of July 30 of that year, the afternoon slot ended up being filled in by DD, who had hosted afternoons from 2-7pm at Miami sister station WPOW.

On September 27, 2024, it was announced that Kevin Kon would become the new afternoon host of WOMX, after Clint "CJ" Robinson moved to mornings in late July of that year. Kon had previously been part of "Power 95.3" WPYO from 2018 until that station was sold to Spanish Broadcasting System in 2022, and before that, he was part of WOMX sister station WJHM, which was then a Top 40 station as "101.9 AMP Radio" before flipping to alternative rock as "FM 101.9", and subsequently flipping to classic hip-hop as the rechristened "102 JAMZ".

== HD programming ==
WOMX-FM also carried an information service for Orlando International Airport on its HD2 subchannel, known as Fly MCO Radio ('MCO' being the airport's IATA code) from 2016 until 2019. The HD signal rebranded as "Orlando Vacation Radio", while maintaining the same format, which overlapped with some of its main station's playlist, along with most of WOCL's as well. Prior to that, 105.1 HD2 previously carried a Top 40/CHR music format, branded as "105.1 AMP Radio", then tweaked to Rhythmic AC as "NOW 105.1 HD2" in mid-2013.

As of November 2019, "Orlando Vacation Radio" was discontinued, and the online stream went dormant on the Radio.com app. That same month, the HD2 station switched over to "Channel Q", which was supposed to launch in Orlando during mid-August 2019 on sister station WQMP. At some point in early-to-mid 2020, the HD2 channel was pulled, with "Channel Q" moving to WQMP's HD3 subchannel, but in January 2022, Channel Q returned to WOMX's HD2 subchannel, with WQMP's HD3 subchannel becoming a secondary feed for Audacy's New Arrivals.
