= WFLF (AM) =

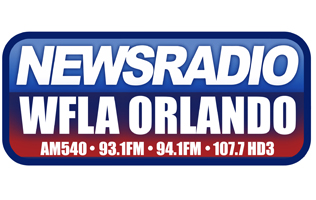
- Pine Hills, Florida; United States
- Broadcast area: Greater Orlando
- Frequency: 540 kHz
- Branding: NewsRadio WFLA Orlando

Programming
- Format: News/talk
- Network: Fox News Radio
- Affiliations: Compass Media Networks; Premiere Networks; Radio America; WESH (news sharing)

Ownership
- Owner: iHeartMedia, Inc.; (iHM Licenses, LLC)
- Sister stations: W283AN; WJRR; WMGF; WRSO; WRUM; WTKS-FM; WXXL; WYGM

History
- First air date: September 9, 1955
- Former call signs: WGTO (1955–1994); WWZN (1994–1996); WQTM (1996–2001)
- Call sign meaning: disambiguation of sister station WFLA in Tampa

Technical information
- Licensing authority: FCC
- Facility ID: 51970
- Class: B
- Power: 50,000 watts (day); 46,000 watts (night)
- Transmitter coordinates: 28°28′54″N 81°39′42.3″W
- Translators: 93.1 W226BT (Orlando); 94.1 W231CT (Orlando)
- Repeater: 107.7 WMGF-HD3 (Mount Dora)

Links
- Public license information: Public file; LMS
- Webcast: Listen live (via iHeartRadio)
- Website: wflaorlando.iheart.com

WFLF (540 kHz) is a commercial AM radio station licensed to Pine Hills, Florida, and serving Greater Orlando. It is owned by iHeartMedia and airs a news/talk format. The studios and offices are in the iHeart Orlando complex in Maitland.

The station broadcasts using a directional antenna at all times, with the signal extending to the east to avoid interfering with Class A stations in Canada and Mexico. The power is 50,000 watts by day (the maximum permitted by the Federal Communications Commission) and 46,000 watts at night. The transmitter is on Tower Pines Drive in Winter Garden. WFLF is Central Florida's Primary Entry Point station in the Emergency Alert System.

WFLF is simulcast on FM translator stations W226BT 93.1 MHz and W231CT 94.1 MHz, both in Orlando. The 93.1 translator broadcasts from South Orange Avenue at East Church Street. The 94.1 translator broadcasts from National Place at West Marvin Avenue. Programming is also heard on co-owned 107.7 WMGF's HD3 subchannel.

== Programming ==
Weekdays begin with local wake-up show Good Morning Orlando with Bud Hedinger, a former TV news anchor on WFTV and WKCF. The rest of the weekday schedule is largely made up of nationally syndicated talk shows from Premiere Networks, a subsidiary of iHeartMedia. They include The Glenn Beck Radio Program, The Clay Travis and Buck Sexton Show, The Jesse Kelly Show, The Dana Loesch Show, Our American Stories with Lee Habeeb, Coast to Coast AM with George Noory and This Morning, America's First News with Gordon Deal. WFLF has a news share agreement with WESH channel 2. The Sean Hannity Show, syndicated by Premiere Networks, is not heard on WFLF because it airs on talk radio competitor WDBO.

Weekends feature shows on money, health, gardening, law, home repair and business. Syndicated shows include Sunday Nights with Bill Cunningham, Somewhere in Time with Art Bell, Rich DeMuro on Tech, At Home with Gary Sullivan and repeats of weekday shows. Some evening and weekend hours are paid brokered programming. Weather reports are from AccuWeather meteorologists and traffic reports come from the co-owned Total Traffic and Weather Network. Most hours begin with world and national news from Fox News Radio.

== History ==
=== Top 40 WGTO ===
On September 9, 1955, at 6:30 a.m., the station first signed on as 10,000-watt, daytime-only WGTO. The station was originally licensed to Haines City. It was owned by KWK, Inc., a popular station in St. Louis. The call sign stood for "Gulf to Ocean", as in Gulf of Mexico to Atlantic Ocean, a reference to the large coverage area afforded by the station's high power and low frequency. Three years later, the station's city of license changed to Cypress Gardens and WGTO boosted its daytime power to 50,000 watts, calling itself "the most powerful station in the nation" due to operating at the lowest AM frequency permitted with the maximum amount of power permitted.

WGTO aired a Top 40 music format from its beginning until the mid-1970s, when the station experimented with a disco format.

=== Country music era ===
On January 29, 1977, WGTO made a dramatic format change to country music, with billboards around Orlando proclaiming the awakening of the market's "Sleeping Giant". As a country station, WGTO became a ratings success and won accolades as one of the top country-formatted radio stations in the nation, including being named Billboard magazine's "Small Market Country Station of the Year for 1978". Around this time, WGTO also added nighttime operations with 1,000 watts of power.

In the 1980s, as country music fans increasingly turned to the FM dial, WGTO lost market share to FM country competitors such as WWKA. In 1982, WGTO was sold and the format changed to religious programming.

=== Switch to oldies ===
Another sale four years later brought another format change, to oldies as "Cruisin' Oldies 54". But the station was not profitable and most of the station's local personalities were laid off in 1992 as the station switched to a satellite feed.

=== Sports format ===
Paxson Communications, owned by Bud Paxson, purchased WGTO in 1994, dropping the heritage call letters in favor of new call sign WWZN, and installing a sports talk format, as "The Sports Zone". In 1996, the call letters were again changed to WQTM ("540 The Team"), keeping the all-sports format.

In 1997, WQTM was acquired by San Antonio-based Clear Channel Communications, the forerunner to current owner iHeartMedia, Inc. On January 29, 2001, WQTM's format and callsign moved to AM 740, which later changed its call sign to WYGM, using the moniker "The Game". With the end of the sports format on AM 540, the station switched to a talk radio format, calling itself "NewsRadio 540 WFLA".

=== Programming changes ===
Through the fall of 2007, WFLF carried the Pat Campbell show from 6–9 a.m., and was the Orlando affiliate for The Mike Gallagher Show. In December 2007, 540 WFLA began to merge programming with WQTM, which was preparing to change to a Spanish-language format. Pat Campbell was fired in December. A simulcast of the 740's The Dan Sileo Show took its place, and became the permanent replacement in January 2008.

WFLF retained Glenn Beck, Rush Limbaugh and Bud Hedinger. The 6-9pm slot was simulcast with 740's "The Finish Line" starting in January 2008. After only one week, however, host Jerry O'Neill abruptly quit, and went to rival sports station WHOO. Contributor Mike Tuck took over the host role, with The Shot Doctor reprising his color role.

During the NFL playoffs, WQTM's contract with the Tampa Bay Buccaneers football network and the NFL on Westwood One was not picked up. Those sports broadcasts were moved to co-owned WTKS-FM.

In April 2009 Dan Sileo was moved to 740, which had relaunched its sports format as WYGM. Bud Hedinger was moved from afternoons on WFLF to morning drive time while the syndicated Dave Ramsey Show was picked up to fill afternoons. Longtime WTKS-FM assistant program director and creative services director Dan Stone signed on to run the station as assistant program director around this same time.

=== Move to FM ===
In early 2012, WFLF began work on a move to FM. Its chief talk radio rival, WDBO, had added a simulcast on its co-owned 96.5 FM frequency as WDBO-FM. To get on the FM dial, WFLF initially simulcast its programming on Altamonte Springs translator W283AN at 104.5 MHz. (That translator today broadcasts an urban contemporary format.) In February 2014, WFLF's FM simulcast moved to W273CA at 102.5 MHz.

On September 1, 2018, WFLF's programming moved down the dial to the Star Over Orlando-owned W226BT on 93.1 MHz after iHeartMedia's lease of W273CA from Central Florida Educational Foundation expired. It added another translator at 94.1, W231CT, several months later.

== Translator ==
The 93.1 and 94.1 frequencies are the primary branding used on the station logo.

Broadcast translators for WFLF
Call sign	Frequency	City of license	FID	ERP (W)	HAAT	Class	Transmitter coordinates	FCC info	Notes
W226BT	93.1 FM	Orlando, Florida	156791	250	133 m (436 ft)	D	28°32′24″N 81°22′45.2″W	LMS	
W231CT	94.1 FM	Orlando, Florida	157706	250	140 m (459 ft)	D	28°41′22.4″N 81°20′56″W	LMS	Heavily directional to the south and southwest to protect WLLD in Tampa, north and northeast to protect WHOG-HD2 (W231CN) in Daytona Beach
