= WEAZ =

WEAZ may refer to:

- WRUG-LD, a low-power television station (channel 26, virtual 50) licensed to serve Baton Rouge, Louisiana, United States, which held the call sign WEAZ-LD from 2013 to 2021
- WPOZ, a radio station (88.3 FM) licensed to serve Orlando, Florida, United States, which held the call sign WEAZ from 1994 to 1998
