= WHOO =

Coordinates: 28°28′1.0″N 81°22′28.3″W

- Winter Park, Florida; United States
- Broadcast area: Greater Orlando
- Frequency: 1080 kHz
- Branding: Relevant Radio

Programming
- Format: Catholic Talk
- Affiliations: Relevant Radio

Ownership
- Owner: Relevant Radio; (Relevant Radio, Inc.)

History
- First air date: 1965; 61 years ago (as WFIV)
- Former call signs: WFIV (1965–2000)
- Call sign meaning: Disambiguation of former sister station WHBO callsign

Technical information
- Licensing authority: FCC
- Facility ID: 54573
- Class: D
- Power: 6,000 watts day 55 watts night

Links
- Public license information: Public file; LMS
- Webcast: Listen Live
- Website: relevantradio.com

WHOO (1080 AM) is a non-commercial listener-supported Catholic talk radio station licensed to Winter Park, Florida, and serving Greater Orlando. It is an owned and operated network affiliate of Relevant Radio.

By day, WHOO transmits 6,000 watts. 1080 kHz is a clear channel frequency reserved for Class A WTIC Hartford and KRLD Dallas, so at night to reduce interference, WHOO reduces power to 55 watts. It uses a directional antenna at all times.

== History ==
The callsign WHOO was used on AM 990 in Orlando, which is now WTLN, from 1947 to 1987 and then again from 1988 to 2001.

AM 1080 began operations in 1965 as 5,000-watt daytimer, WFIV, "the mighty five", with a Country music format, with a brief stint in the ’90s as Big Band station. The Country format continued until 1995, when WFIV switched to a Spanish contemporary hits format as "Radio Exitos." WFIV then went to a Christian talk and teaching format as "Genesis 1080" in 2000. The following year, the WHOO call sign moved to 1080 from 990, along with AM 990's adult standards music format, followed by a change to sports in 2002.

In 2008, after rival sports station WQTM changed formats, WHOO began calling itself "The Only Game in Town". It picked up the first two hours (Noon-2 p.m.) of The Jim Rome Show on January 8, and took the third hour of the show beginning on April 25, the day of the Jim Rome Smack-Off. Prior to picking up Jim Rome, the station carried all three hours of Colin Cowherd and Tirico and Van Pelt.

On January 21, Jerry O'Neill, formerly on WQTM, joined WHOO. He abruptly quit Clear Channel Orlando a week after moving from WQTM to 540 WFLA. He co-hosted the afternoon show with Brady Ackerman until January 12, 2009, when Ackerman quit the station in order to purchase two radio stations: WGGG in Gainesville and WMOP in Ocala, both sister ESPN Radio stations. Also on January 12, WHOO ditched its original moniker of "Orlando's ESPN" in favor of "1080 the Team".

After Ackerman left, show producer Brian Fritz briefly filled in as O'Neill's co-host. On February 8, 2009, Mike Tuck, who co-hosted with Jerry O'Neill on WQTM and 540 WFLA before O'Neill left, jumped to WHOO and replaced Brady Ackerman on their afternoon sports show. The show was now titled: Tuck & O'Neill. Ironically, WQTM re-branded again as "740 the Game" and changed callsigns to WYGM, returning to the sports format.

Genesis Communications announced on June 22, 2012, that WHOO would drop ESPN Radio on October 1, 2012, in favor of NBC Sports Radio. The change was executed as scheduled. The station retained Tuck & O'Neill, extending it by one hour to end at 7 p.m. instead of 6 p.m. It also picked up The Dan Patrick Show for the 9a.m.-Noon hour, as well as local morning and noontime shows from Tampa Bay affiliate WHBO featuring David Baumann and Whitney Johnson, respectively. WHBO also transitioned to NBC Sports Radio.

The station broadcast three local sports talk shows, The David Baumann Show (6-9 a.m. weekdays), The Whitney Johnson Experience (noon-3 p.m. weekdays) and Tuck and O'Neill (3-7 p.m. weekdays), which was hosted by Jerry O'Neill and Mike Tuck. The Dan Patrick Show was also in the programming mix and aired from 9 a.m.-noon weekdays.

1080 The Team was also the local affiliate for the Jacksonville Jaguars, Miami Marlins, and Miami Hurricanes football. It was also the local affiliate of Westwood One's NFL coverage, presenting normal Sunday games, Thursday Night Football, Sunday Night Football and Monday Night Football.

On March 27, 2017, WHOO was granted a Federal Communications Commission construction permit to change the community of license to Winter Park, increase day power to 50,000 watts, increase critical hours power to 27,000 watts, increase night power to 1,000 watts and move to the WRSO transmitter site. It did not act on its construction permit and according to the FCC's website, it has expired.

As of 2017, WHOO effectively simulcasted WHBO under the "Sports Talk Florida" umbrella. That past week, it was “sold” and switched to Haitian language programing, but returned to sports later on.

Genesis Communications announced that it would sell WHOO and WAMT to Immaculate Heart Media (Relevant Radio). The sale was completed effective August 14, 2018.

At some point in late 2018-early 2019, WHOO and its then-sister station WAMT changed their formats from sports to Catholic talk, branded as "Relevant Radio".

As of 2021, the station is broadcasting English-language Relevant Radio network.
