= WFIT =

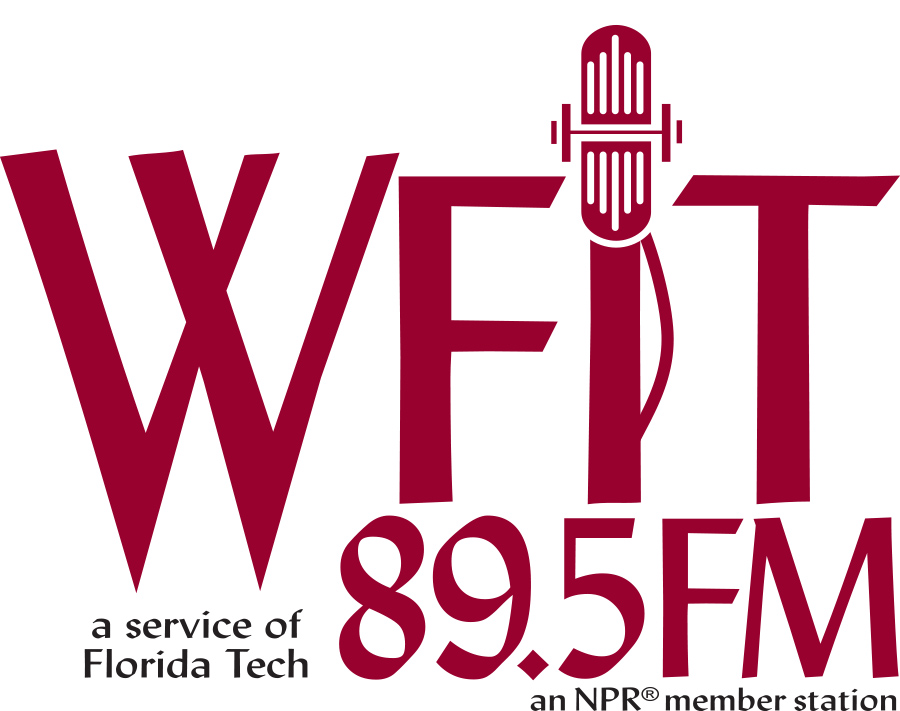
- Melbourne, Florida; United States
- Broadcast area: Space Coast
- Frequency: 89.5 MHz (HD Radio)

Programming
- Format: Public radio and adult album alternative
- Affiliations: National Public Radio

Ownership
- Owner: Florida Institute of Technology

History
- First air date: April 1975
- Call sign meaning: Florida Institute of Technology

Technical information
- Licensing authority: FCC
- Facility ID: 65631
- Class: A
- ERP: 4,700 watts
- HAAT: 45 meters (148 ft)
- Transmitter coordinates: 28°03′51″N 80°37′25″W NAD27

Links
- Public license information: Public file; LMS
- Webcast: Listen live (via TuneIn)
- Website: wfit.org

WFIT (89.5 FM) is a non-commercial radio station licensed to Melbourne, Florida, United States, and serving the Space Coast with an adult album alternative format. It is owned by the Florida Institute of Technology with studios and its broadcast tower at the WFIT Broadcast Center on the FIT campus on West University Boulevard. WFIT is funded in part by individual memberships, corporate underwriting, state and local grants, the Corporation for Public Broadcasting and Florida Tech.

WFIT's transmitter is on Science Circle, off South Babcock Street in Melbourne.

== Programming ==
WFIT's weekday programming specializes in adult album alternative (Triple-A) music. The station features local music shows hosted by various staff members. The programming offers occasional showcases of live in-house musical sessions and original interviews with local and touring bands. Also on the weekday schedule is the nationally syndicated Triple A music show World Cafe from WXPN Philadelphia. Two NPR news and information shows are heard in the morning and afternoon drive time, Morning Edition and All Things Considered.

WFIT's evening and weekend music broadcasts include an eclectic blend of genres and programs, including indie rock, folk, bluegrass, blues, jazz, world music, beach music, Latin, new age, reggae, ambient, Americana, and various forms of pop.

The station broadcasts several syndicated talk and news shows, including Weekend Edition, All Things Considered (Saturday and Sunday editions), and Tech Nation. WFIT produces community content segments Coastal Connection, Inside Florida Tech, Psychology Science Minute, and the Lagoon Minute.

WFIT airs local news briefs produced in conjunction with Florida Today.

== History ==
=== FIT college radio ===
WFIT signed on the air in April 1975. In its early years, it was a student-run college radio station. In the 1980s, the station became a professionally-run operation. WFIT was regarded as one of the top alternative music college radio stations in the country. Its programming included early forms of alternative rock, punk, hardcore, post-punk, new wave, synthpop alongside classical, jazz, reggae, blues, and funk. In the early 1980s, the station promoted itself as "The New Music Leader."

In 1985, approximately 65 volunteers were involved at the station. Of these volunteers, approximately 40 percent were Florida Tech students.

In 1986, the FCC denied a request from WFIT to increase transmitter power to 20,000 watts. The same year, its transmitter equipment was stolen.

=== Top 5 college station ===
In 1988 and 1989, WFIT was voted as one of the top five college radio stations in the USA by The Gavin Report, an industry trade publication. In 1989, the four other college radio stations competing for top honors with WFIT were KUSF at University of California, KCMU at the University of Washington in Seattle (now KEXP), WRAS at Georgia State University, and WTUL at Tulane University in New Orleans.

In 1990, the staff numbered 80 people. This included 49 DJs.

In March 1993, WFIT dropped its daytime alternative rock format in favor of a contemporary jazz sound similar to that heard on WLOQ-FM in Winter Park. Later in 1993, WFIT was interconnected with the public radio satellite system.

=== NPR affiliation ===
In 1985, WFIT became an affiliate of National Public Radio. WFIT's shift into the role of NPR affiliate reinforced the sentiments of serving the broadcast area with access to lifelong learning resources. Public radio news shows, culturally diverse music, local artist exposure, and educational content are central to the ethos of WFIT's community outreach and service.

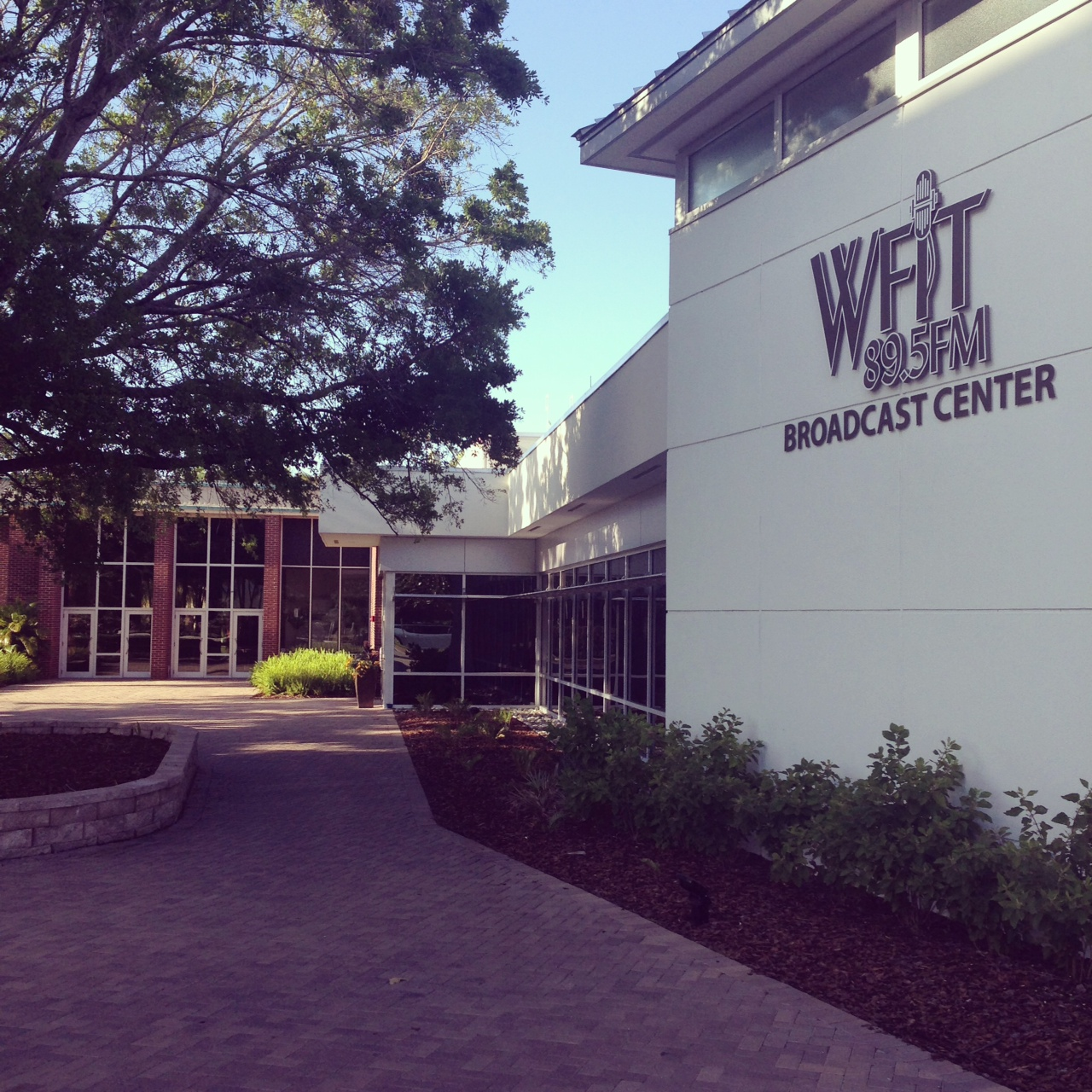
The outside of the WFIT broadcast center.

In 1998 an FCC-approved power increase to 8,000 watts extended the station's signal to include more Brevard County listeners, reaching north to Cocoa and Cocoa Beach, as well as south to Vero Beach in Indian River County. Automation equipment has enabled the station to broadcast 24 hours a day, seven days a week.

WFIT upgraded its transmitter in 2004. It became the first radio station in Brevard County to broadcast using HD Radio technology. WFIT's programming is also streamed worldwide via their website.

=== Adult Album Alternative ===
In 2006, the station changed its daytime broadcasting to Triple A format with the introduction of in-house produced Sound Waves, followed by NPR distributed World Cafe.

In 2012, the station moved to a newly built 5000 sq. ft. broadcast center next to Florida Tech's Gleason Performing Arts Center. The new building contains six recording studios, a performance studio, and a conference studio.

=== Community Involvement ===
Most of WFIT's DJs are community volunteers. WFIT sponsors concerts throughout the community featuring both local musicians and national acts.

The station also collaborates with the Florida Historical Society to produce a weekly Florida Frontiers radio segment designed to "explore the relevance of Florida history to contemporary society and promote awareness of heritage and culture tourism options in the state."

== See also ==
- Campus radio
- List of college radio stations in the United States
