= W283AN =

Relays WTKS-FM HD2, Cocoa Beach
- Altamonte Springs, Florida; United States
- Broadcast area: Orlando, Florida
- Frequency: 104.5 MHz
- Branding: 104.5 The Beat

Programming
- Format: Mainstream urban
- Affiliations: Premiere Networks

Ownership
- Owner: iHeartMedia; (iHM Licenses, LLC)
- Sister stations: WFLF, WJRR, WMGF, WRSO, WRUM, WTKS-FM, WXXL, WYGM

History
- First air date: April 2007

Technical information
- Licensing authority: FCC
- Facility ID: 149386
- Class: D
- ERP: 221 watts
- HAAT: 153 meters (502 ft)
- Transmitter coordinates: 28°36′23″N 81°27′24.3″W

Links
- Public license information: Public file; LMS
- Webcast: Listen Live
- Website: 1045thebeat.iheart.com

W283AN (104.5 FM) is an FM translator station licensed to cover Orlando, Florida. It rebroadcasts a mainstream urban format from the HD2 subchannel of WTKS-FM. The station, which was launched on February 12, 2014, is owned and operated by iHeartMedia. The station launched the day after WJHM shifted from Rhythmic CHR to Top 40/CHR.

The station first signed on in 2007 as an FM translator for WREH-FM, carrying "ReachFM" programming. Reach Communications sold its translators along with others in the state of Florida, W283AN and W246BO (now W245CL), in 2012 and 2014 to rebroadcast WFLF and WYGM. Clear Channel (now iHeartMedia) moved the WFLF simulcast from WTKS-HD2/W283AN to WMGF-HD3/W273CA, which previously had rebroadcast WMGF-HD2 in order to launch an urban contemporary format, branded as "104.5 The Beat". It launched the day prior to WJHM's switch to CHR from rhythmic contemporary, that station first flipped to the format in 2005 briefly to compete with WPYO and in 2012 to compete with WXXL, Orlando's only CHR outlet at the time.
