= WMGF =

Radio station in Mount Dora–Orlando, Florida

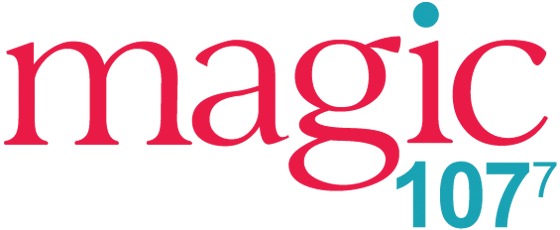
- Mount Dora, Florida; United States
- Broadcast area: Central Florida / Orlando
- Frequency: 107.7 MHz (HD Radio)
- Branding: Magic 107.7

Programming
- Format: Adult contemporary / Christmas music
- Subchannels: HD2: Smooth jazz; HD3: Talk radio (simulcast of WFLF)

Ownership
- Owner: iHeartMedia; (iHM Licenses, LLC)
- Sister stations: W283AN, WFLF, WJRR, WRSO, WRUM, WTKS-FM, WXXL, WYGM

History
- First air date: February 1966; 60 years ago (as WHIY)
- Former call signs: WHIY (1966–1973); WORJ (1973–1981); WJYO (1981–1990)
- Call sign meaning: "Magic Florida"

Technical information
- Licensing authority: FCC
- Facility ID: 51981
- Class: C
- ERP: 100,000 watts
- HAAT: 484 meters (1,588 ft)
- Transmitter coordinates: 28.91975°N 81.3185°W

Links
- Public license information: Public file; LMS
- Webcast: FM/HD1: Listen Live; HD2: Listen Live; HD3 Listen Live
- Website: FM/HD1: magic107.iheart.com HD2: wloqradio.iheart.com HD3: wflaorlando.iheart.com

WMGF (107.7 FM) is a commercial radio station licensed to Mount Dora, and serving Orlando and Central Florida. It is owned by iHeartMedia and airs an adult contemporary radio format, switching to Christmas music for much of November and December. Its offices and studios are on Maitland Center Parkway in Maitland.

WMGF broadcasts with an effective radiated power (ERP) of 100,000 watts from a transmitter on Miller Road in Orange City, Florida. The station can be heard as far as Jacksonville to the north, as far as Sebastian to the south, and is one of the few Orlando stations that covers Ocala and parts of Gainesville. WMGF broadcasts using HD Radio technology. One digital subchannel airs smooth jazz, informally using the call sign of a past Orlando jazz station, WLOQ. Another subchannel rebroadcasts the talk radio programming of co-owned WFLF 540 AM.

== History ==
=== WHIY and WORJ ===
In February 1966, the station first signed on as WHIY, powered at 28,000 watts and owned by the Orlando Radio & TV Company. In 1969, Orlando Radio & TV bought WORL Orlando (now WIWA in Eatonville), operating the two stations together from offices and studios in Orlando. In the early 1970s, 107.7 began airing a Top 40 format, switching to the call letters WORJ, standing for "Orange," a major crop in Central Florida. By the late 70s, the station had switched to an album rock format, calling itself "Zeta 7."

=== Joy 108 WJYO ===
In 1978, Sudbrink Broadcasting bought the station. In 1981, the call letters switched to WJYO, airing a soft adult contemporary format as Joy 108. (The WJYO call sign is now used on a Christian radio station in Fort Myers, Florida at 91.5 FM.) In 1987, the station was bought by Metroplex Communications of Orlando. In September 1990, Metroplex changed the call sign to WMGF, calling the station Magic 107.7. In 1993, Paxson Communications, owned by Florida millionaire Bud Paxson, bought the station for $5.6 million, coupled with WWZN (now WPRD).

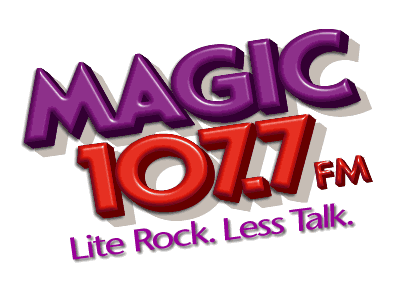
Former logo of the radio station used from September 2001 through March 2005

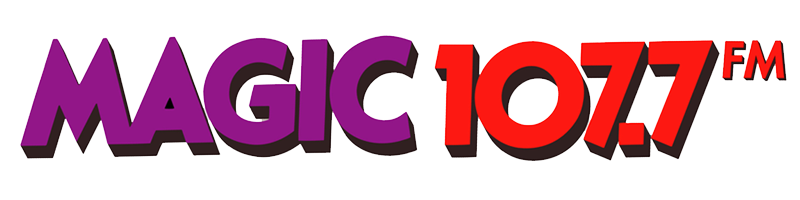
Former logo of the radio station used from April 2005

=== Purchase by Clear Channel ===
In 1997, Clear Channel Communications, a forerunner of iHeartMedia, acquired the station, continuing its soft AC format. In 2000, it became one of Clear Channel's first stations to test the all-Christmas format it had successfully built in Phoenix, Arizona; WMGF adopted the format November 24, 2000, a year ahead of the format's national launch.

On January 25, 2008, it was announced that WMGF would be one of several Clear Channel radio stations to be sold, in order to remain under Federal Communications Commission ownership caps following the sale of Clear Channel to private investors. Those stations would be placed into the Aloha Station Trust. But those plans changed and WMGF remains under iHeart ownership.

Former logo of the radio station used from 2009 to July 2014

WMGF was, for a time, an affiliate of the Delilah After Dark and John Tesh syndicated radio shows. Both were dropped in fall 2010. Nights and weekends, the station adopted Clear Channel's Premium Choice music service. The station's playlist was coordinated with the national Premium Choice playlist around the clock, which gave the station a more uptempo sound. Around Fall 2011, the station had its playlist return to local programming.

By March 2012, the station was placed on the Mediabase add board. When Clear Channel had another round of lay-offs in Fall 2012, the station's program director was let go. In 2013, a new PD was hired who organized a playlist of softer 70s, 80s, and 90s hits. By July 2014, the station changed its slogan to "More Variety from the 80s to Now." With the new handle, the station eliminated 1970s music, moving to a playlist of 80s, 90s and 2000's music. From 2017 to 2020, WMGF played 80s music every Friday from 5 to 10 p.m. Since then, the station rotates playing a different decade of 80s, 90s, and totally 2000's music every weekend.

Weekday mornings, WMGF features the "Magic Morning Show" hosted by Chad Pitt and Leslye Gale. Gale co-hosted with John Forsythe from 2010 to 2018, when Forsythe retired after a 50-year career in radio. Outside of key hours on weekdays, the station is mostly voice-tracked.

Although not a Christian music station, WJYO produced a syndicated program on Sunday mornings called "Glory of Joy", which aired contemporary Christian music. The program continued after the switch to WMGF. Another former weekend staple on WMGF is American Top 40: The 80s distributed by Premiere Networks, a subsidiary of iHeartMedia (the program eventually moved to WOCL-FM in the 2010s).

== HD Radio ==
=== HD2 ===
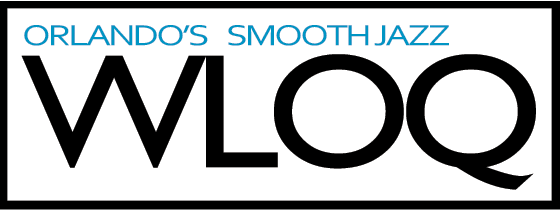
WLOQ logo used for WMGF-HD2.

WMGF is licensed for HD Radio operations and carries Broadcast Architecture's Smooth Jazz network programming on its HD2 subchannel. In August 2011, the HD2 subchannel began simulcasting on an FM translator at 102.5 MHz. The translator, W273CA, was leased by Clear Channel, calling itself "102.5 WLOQ," although those call letters were not officially assigned to the station. The translator restored the smooth jazz format for analog radio listeners in the immediate Orlando area several weeks after the original 103.1 WLOQ dropped the format in favor of Spanish tropical music as WHKQ (now WFYY). W273CA's area of strongest coverage includes the western suburbs of Orlando, including Winter Garden, Pine Hills, Ocoee, and Clermont.

The simulcast on 102.5 FM ended on February 12, 2014, when W273CA flipped to a simulcast of co-owned talk radio station WFLF. Smooth Jazz WLOQ continues as the HD2 channel of 107.7 and on the iHeartRadio streaming service on line, although it is no longer available on conventional radios in Orlando.

=== HD3 ===
WMGF's HD3 subchannel rebroadcasts the talk radio programming of co-owned WFLF 540 AM.
