= WJRR =

Active rock radio station in Cocoa Beach–Orlando, Florida

- Cocoa Beach, Florida; United States
- Broadcast area: East Central Florida (Orlando-Daytona Beach-Melbourne)
- Frequency: 101.1 MHz (HD Radio)
- Branding: 101.1 WJRR

Programming
- Format: Active rock
- Subchannels: HD2: Sports (WYGM)
- Affiliations: Compass Media Networks; iHeartRadio; Premiere Networks; Premium Choice

Ownership
- Owner: iHeartMedia; (iHM Licenses, LLC)
- Sister stations: W283AN, WFLF, WMGF, WRSO, WRUM, WTKS-FM, WXXL, WYGM

History
- First air date: July 19, 1962
- Former call signs: WXBR (1962–1968); WCKS (1968–1984); WDOQ (1984–1985); WSTF (1985–1992); WVRI (1992–1993)
- Call sign meaning: "Just Real Rock"

Technical information
- Licensing authority: FCC
- Facility ID: 51983
- Class: C
- ERP: 100,000 watts
- HAAT: 487 meters (1,598 ft)
- Transmitter coordinates: 28°34′51.9″N 81°4′31.2″W
- Translator: HD2: 96.9 W245CL (Deltona)

Links
- Public license information: Public file; LMS
- Webcast: Listen live (via iHeartRadio)
- Website: wjrr.iheart.com

WJRR (101.1 FM) is a commercial radio station licensed to Cocoa Beach, Florida, United States, serving Greater Orlando. Owned by iHeartMedia, WJRR airs an active rock format with studios on Maitland Center Parkway in the Orlando suburb of Maitland. The station transmitter is off Fort Christmas Road in Christmas, Florida. In addition to a standard analog transmission, WJRR broadcasts in HD Radio and streams online via iHeartRadio.

== History ==
=== Early years and active rock (1962–2002) ===
On June 12, 1962, the station first signed on as classical music station WXBR. It was owned by the Stereo Broadcasting Company with studios and offices in Cape Canaveral.

The station changed its call sign to WCKS in 1968 and adopted a Top 40/CHR format as CK101. In 1984, the station picked up the call letters WDOQ after they were dropped by 101.9 FM in Daytona Beach and the format was changed to album rock during the week of June 9, 1984, then to adult contemporary shortly afterward that August. 101.1 FM adopted the new call sign WSTF in 1985, and became known as Sunny 101 and later Star 101, continuing with an adult contemporary format.

After a brief stint as WVRI Variety 101 for nearly a year beginning on February 10, 1992, the current WJRR call sign and rock format were adopted on April 19, 1993, as 101.1 WJRR. The station carried the comedy morning show Ron & Ron. An early positioning statement was "Just Ron & Ron in the Morning, Just Rock and Roll the rest of the day." As the station evolved to modern rock around 1994 under the guidance of Program Director Steve Robertson, the official slogan became 101.1 WJRR, The Cutting Edge of Rock. Following the acquisition of crosstown rock rival WDIZ from Shamrock Communications in 1996, WJRR shifted to an Active Rock format with the slogan "The Rock Station". PD duties were picked up by WDIZ Program Director "Diamond" Dick Sheetz as Steve Robertson exited for an A&R position at Atlantic Records. After several weeks of simulcasting WJRR on the WDIZ signal, WDIZ picked up the call letters WSHE from 103.5 in Miami and shifted away from rock toward a female-leaning AAA format, leaving WJRR as the only Orlando rock station playing new music.

In 1997, WJRR was acquired by Clear Channel Communications, now known as iHeartMedia.

=== Earthday Birthday ===
In the 1990s, WJRR started an annual live music festival known as "Earthday Birthday" at the Central Florida Fairgrounds in Orlando. Each year the event brings in around 12 to 15,000 fans from all over the state of Florida. The show lasts approximately 12 hours with festivities normally beginning around 11 a.m. Past acts have included Kid Rock, Serj Tankian, Three Doors Down, The Offspring, Rob Zombie, Mudvayne, Godsmack, Velvet Revolver, Sevendust, Breaking Benjamin, Stone Sour, Papa Roach, WRONG, Staind, 311, Sublime with Rome and Shinedown.

=== Alternative rock (2002–2011) ===
In 2002, to compete up against former rocker WOCL, WJRR shifted back to a modern rock format from active rock and lured back legendary former PM Drive talent Sideshow Dan for afternoons, changing its moniker to Real Rock 101-One. In January 2008, WJRR dropped the "Real Rock" moniker and reverted to 101one WJRR, The Rock Station, just when rival WOCL switched to its current classic hits format.

On January 25, 2008, it was announced that WJRR would be one of several Clear Channel radio stations to be sold, in order to remain under the ownership caps following the sale of Clear Channel to private investors. Under Federal Communications Commission rules, Clear Channel had more radio stations in the Orlando radio market than permitted. WJRR and other stations to be sold were placed into the Aloha Stations Trust. In December 2008, Clear Channel took back WJRR after Arbitron reassigned the station to the Brevard County radio market, even though it is widely heard in Orlando.

The syndicated Lex and Terry program replaced The Fiasco with Pat Lynch and Taco Bob on April 7, 2008.

On May 1, 2010, during the 17th Annual Earthday Birthday event, it was announced that Orlando Mayor Buddy Dyer had declared May 1 to be 101.1 WJRR Day. This was in honor of Earthday Birthday becoming the largest single day music event to happen in the entire state of Florida, and also possibly the southeastern United States.

On August 27, 2010, Crash and LT announced that WJRR would be dropping the Lex & Terry morning program, as a response to "literally thousands of emails and phone calls" from listeners stating that they would prefer music in the morning. Starting August 30, Crash and LT were heard in the 6-10AM slot. Pat Lynch, former morning show co-host, returned to the station for the afternoons in Crash and LT's old 3-8PM slot. Mel Taylor and Dickerman continued in their usual time slots.

=== Return to active rock (2011–present) ===
In 2011, the station was added to the Nielsen BDS active rock panel, but WJRR still marketed itself as alternative rock. By August 2011, following the flip of Cox Radio's longtime classic rock station WHTQ to talk as WDBO-FM, WJRR completed the move to active rock. In addition, the station began adding more classic rock artists such as Led Zeppelin, Kiss & Def Leppard to its playlist, as is the trend in active rock radio.

The WJRR HD2 subchannel formerly broadcast the iHeartRadio "Classic Rock" station, but it switched in March 2011 to Old School Alternative "Channel X". As of May 5, 2012, its HD2 subchannel switched to a simulcast of WYGM, which currently feeds an FM analog translator. Its HD3 subchannel carried an alternative rock format known as "Alt 101.1 HD3" from September 2016 until July 2024, when it was quietly discontinued and shut off. The final song played on “ALT 101.1 HD3” was “Dirty Little Secret” by The All-American Rejects on July 9, 2024, at 9:24 AM E.T. With the flip of former sister station WQMP (now WJHM) from alternative rock as “FM 101.9” to classic hip-hop as “102 JAMZ”, WJRR became the last remaining rock station in the market that played current music. As a result, the station began to expand its playlist.

=== Past DJs ===
Alumni include Ron & Ron, Buckethead, Crash, Larry the Cable Guy, Mark Samansky, Sideshow Dan, Dick Sheetz, Fish, Just Plain Mark, Dickerman.

== Translator ==
Call sign	Frequency	City of license	FID	ERP (W)	HAAT	Class	Transmitter coordinates	FCC info
W245CL	96.9 FM	Deltona, Florida	146621	250	144 m (472 ft)	D	28°36′22.6″N 81°27′23.9″W	LMS
