= WJHM =

Radio station in Daytona Beach, Florida

- Daytona Beach, Florida; United States
- Broadcast area: Greater Orlando; Central Florida
- Frequency: 101.9 MHz (HD Radio)
- Branding: 102 JAMZ

Programming
- Language: English
- Format: Classic hip-hop
- Subchannels: HD2: Sports gambling "BetMGM Network"; HD3: Urban gospel "G Praise"

Ownership
- Owner: Audacy, Inc.; (Audacy License, LLC)
- Sister stations: WOCL; WOMX-FM

History
- First air date: November 1, 1967
- Former call signs: WMFJ-FM (1967–1973); WQXQ (1973–1980); WDOQ (1980–1984); WCFI (1984–1986); WORZ (1986–1988); WJHM (1988–2016); WQMP (2016–2024)
- Call sign meaning: "Jam"

Technical information
- Licensing authority: FCC
- Facility ID: 73137
- Class: C
- ERP: 92,000 watts
- HAAT: 483 meters (1,585 ft)
- Transmitter coordinates: 28°55′11″N 81°19′7.2″W
- Translators: 93.3 W227CP (Sanford, relays HD3); 97.7 W249EH (Daytona Beach, relays HD3); 106.3 W292DZ (Orlando, relays HD3)

Links
- Public license information: Public file; LMS
- Webcast: Listen live (via Audacy); HD2: Listen live (via Audacy); HD3: Listen live
- Website: www.audacy.com/102jamzorlando; HD3: gpraise.com

WJHM (101.9 FM) is a radio station licensed to Daytona Beach, Florida serving the Orlando and Space Coast areas of Central Florida. Owned by Audacy, Inc., it broadcasts a classic hip-hop format branded as "102 JAMZ". Its studios are located in Maitland and the transmitter is in Orange City.

== History ==
=== Early years ===
The 101.9 frequency began as WMFJ-FM on November 1, 1967. The FM sister to AM 1450 in Daytona Beach, WMFJ-FM was an automated beautiful music station known as Stereo 102. The station's calls were changed to WQXQ in 1973, and the format became automated album oriented rock as Q102. Despite the rock format's success, management felt that a Top 40 hit station would have more mass appeal, and so Q102 changed from rock to Top 40 in 1976; initially the station remained automated, but by the end of the 1970s it employed a staff of live and local announcers. The station changed its calls to WDOQ in 1980, but the format remained top 40, the moniker remained Q102, and the ratings remained high. Due to new competition in the Daytona market from WNFI in 1982, Q102 began to more aggressively target the Orlando market as opposed to only Daytona Beach. Although plans for a big 100,000-watt signal that would have extended to St. Augustine, Gainesville and Ocala were scrapped, WDOQ's listenership continued to grow.

In 1984, WDOQ was sold and adopted the new calls WCFI, with a satellite-fed adult contemporary format from Transtar (now Dial Global), using the I-4 (a tribute to Miami's WINZ-FM) and later Sunny 102 monikers. In 1985, the station was purchased by Duffy Broadcasting for $7.7 million. On June 16, 1986, the format and calls changed again to WORZ, Z-102FM, a classic rock station. In 1987, it was sold to Beasley-Reed Broadcasting for $9.2 million.

=== First "102 Jamz" era ===
On April 1, 1988, the call letters were changed to WJHM, and the station adopted a CHR/urban format as 102 Jamz under the direction of Program Director Duff Lindsey and consultant Jerry Clifton. The first song on "102 Jamz" was "Jam on It" by Newcleus. The station was an immediate success with listeners, and within two years, ascended to the top of the Orlando ratings. Some DJs during this time included Joe Nasty doing mornings, Magic Scott (now Cadillac Jack in Philadelphia) doing afternoons, and Cedric Hollywood as mid-day jock and music director. WJHM was purchased by Chancellor Media in 1997. In late 1998, Hollywood left for a position at WEDR in Miami. Soon after, WJHM began shifting towards an urban-oriented direction. Although the station was labeled as "Rhythmic", WJHM remained an urban station at its core, and would shift to urban altogether around the same time WCFB evolved to urban AC in the late 1990s.

The late 1990s brought a time of mergers with Chancellor merging with Evergreen and forming AMFM, Inc., who held ownership of WJHM until it merged with Clear Channel in 2000. To comply with FCC ownership rules, Clear Channel sold WJHM to Infinity Broadcasting (later CBS Radio) in 2001. For a brief time in 2005, WJHM reverted to rhythmic to go up against rhythmic-formatted WPYO, though WJHM would revert to urban a short time later. Although it was one of the top ranking radio stations in the market, WJHM would later fall in the ratings behind WPYO, whose Rhythmic direction slightly favored hip hop but whose playlist was almost identical to WJHM.

WJHM's logo under the first iteration of the "102 JAMZ" branding; current logo is similar, but features a cleaner, sharpened design and omits the "FM" portion

In the fall of 2011, WJHM began a transition to a more pop-oriented rhythmic Top 40 direction in order to better compete with WXXL, the market's only Top 40/CHR and former sister station; the shift would be completed by the following February. In late January 2012, WJHM dropped Rickey Smiley's syndicated morning show in favor of a more music-intensive morning block, let go airstaffer Jay Love after 18 years, and added songs from artists like Jessie J, Avicii, Kelly Clarkson, fun., The Wanted, and Adele. In addition, the station's longtime "Non-Stop Hip-Hop and R&B" slogan was dropped, replacing it with "102 Minutes of Commercial-Free Music". Along with these changes, WJHM dropped the Sunday morning gospel programming syndicated from WVEE, although WJHM's HD2 subchannel broadcast a Gospel format full-time.

=== 101.9 AMP Radio ===
Logo of AMP Radio (2014–2017)

During the early morning hours of February 11, 2014, WJHM dropped the "Jamz" branding after 26 years and began stunting with a loop of the song "Get Lucky" by Daft Punk. At 10:19 that morning, WJHM rebranded as 101.9 AMP Radio and shifted to Top 40/CHR altogether, putting it in line with CBS Radio's "AMP Radio" branding, which favors rhythmic pop and dance hits. The first song on "AMP Radio" was "Timber" by Pitbull featuring Kesha. Despite the rebranding, WJHM continued to lag in the Arbitron ratings behind CHR competitor WXXL and then-rhythmic CHR station WPYO.

On January 20, 2016, WJHM changed its call letters to WQMP to match the "AMP Radio" branding.

On February 2, 2017, CBS Radio announced it would merge with Entercom. The merger was approved on November 9, and was consummated on November 17.

=== Alt 101.9/FM 101.9 ===
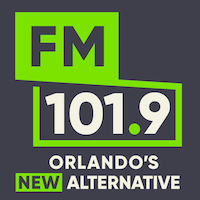
Logo as "FM 101.9"

On November 29, 2017, at 3 pm, after playing "End Game" by Taylor Swift, WQMP flipped to alternative rock as Alt 101.9, joining several other former "AMP Radio"-branded stations in switching to the format and brand after the completion of the Entercom merger. The change brought the format back to a full-market signal in Orlando for the first time since 2008, when sister station WOCL flipped to classic hits. The first song on Alt was "Smells Like Teen Spirit" by Nirvana. The most recent analog broadcast station to air the format full-time, Cox Media's W297BB/WCFB-HD2, was aired on a translator and an HD sub-channel, and aired from June 2014 to January 2016. Elsewhere in the Orlando market, iHeartMedia's talk-formatted WTKS-FM featured alternative on nights and weekends, and also aired on two HD subchannels in the Orlando market, WOCL-HD2 (until 2019) and WJRR-HD3 (until July 2024), the latter of which also used the brand Alt as standardized by iHeartMedia. This name conflict with iHeart resulted in WQMP quietly changing its on-air brand to FM 101.9 on December 4 of that year.

In September 2020, most of the local DJs and programming staff were laid off and replaced by out-of-market programming.

=== Return of 102 Jamz ===
On August 1, 2024, at 4 p.m., after playing "Move Along" by The All-American Rejects, WQMP flipped to classic hip-hop, returning to the "102 Jamz" branding; the first song under the relaunched format was "Lose Control" by Missy Elliott and Ciara. With the flip, regional vice president Ross Mahoney left the station; Miguel "Mijo" Arizarry, the brand manager at Audacy-owned WPOW across the state in Miami (which itself had undergone a similar quasi-revival of their longtime brand earlier that year, though it had not been dropped like WQMP had), would be hired in the same position for WQMP. With the change, Audacy requested a call letter change back to WJHM, which took effect on August 8.

On October 3, 2024, WJHM announced the return of Dwight ‘DJ D-Strong’ Ricketts as afternoon host. Prior to this, he was part of iHeartMedia’s WTKS-HD2/W283AN as program director and weekend on-air staffer for WXXL before he was laid off as part of a nationwide series of layoffs in August 2024. He was also part of WJHM during its initial iteration as “102 JAMZ” from 2003 until the station’s flip to CHR as “101.9 AMP Radio” in 2014.

On November 21, 2024, WJHM announced the return of Lizzette Perez, this time as a mid-day host.

== HD Radio subchannels ==
=== WJHM-HD2 ===
WJHM activated its HD2 subchannel at the same time it started its HD radio operations at some point in the mid-2000s, which originally carried an urban gospel format, branded as "102 Gospel Jamz", from the 2000s until 2018. In August 2019, WQMP-HD2 was supposed to flip to "Channel Q", an LGBTQ-oriented talk/dance music format based in Los Angeles. Since the HD2 stream did not appear on the station, it was placed on the HD2 subchannel of sister station WOMX-FM in early November 2019. The HD2 stream then reappeared later in 2020 carrying an alternative format featuring new releases, known as "Orlando’s New Arrivals". On February 23, 2022, WQMP-HD2 flipped to Audacy's in-house BetQL Network.

=== WJHM-HD3 ===
As of July 2019, WQMP-HD3 was carrying a Haitian format from an unknown source. The HD2 and HD3 subchannels were removed around early 2020. In late 2020, the HD3 subchannel reappeared and became the new home for "Channel Q" in Orlando after being dropped by WOMX-FM’s HD2 subchannel at some point in early-to-mid 2020. In January 2022, “Channel Q” returned to WOMX-HD2, which led to the HD3 subchannel becoming a secondary feed for Audacy’s New Arrivals. The HD3 subchannel was turned off until later in 2023, where the Haitian-language radio format returned on the HD3 sub channel after a 3-year hiatus. It was turned off again as of early 2024. In May 2024, Central Florida Education Foundation, owner of WPOZ, moved its urban gospel-formatted “G-Praise” from its HD3 subchannel to WQMP’s HD3 subchannel under a leasing agreement with Audacy. This returned the format to an HD subchannel of the station for the first time in six years, when WQMP-HD2's "102 Gospel Jamz" format was dropped.
