= W273CA =

Relays WPOZ-HD4, Orlando
- Orlando, Florida; United States
- Broadcast area: Orlando, Florida
- Frequency: 102.5 MHz
- Branding: La Z 102.5

Programming
- Format: Spanish CCM

Ownership
- Owner: Central Florida Educational Foundation, Inc.
- Sister stations: WPOZ

History
- First air date: 2004

Technical information
- Licensing authority: FCC
- Facility ID: 157099
- Class: D (translator)
- ERP: 250 watts
- HAAT: 138 meters (469 ft)
- Transmitter coordinates: 28°36′21″N 81°25′4″W

Links
- Public license information: Public file; LMS
- Webcast: Stream
- Website: laz.radio

W273CA (102.5 MHz, "La Z 102.5") is a non-commercial FM radio station translator in Orlando, Florida. It is owned by the Central Florida Educational Foundation, airing a Christian Spanish format branded as "La Z 102.5". From 2011 until February 2014, the translator aired a smooth jazz format as "102.5 WLOQ," when it was leased by iHeartMedia.

== History ==
W273CA was previously a repeater of WPOZ in the Lake City area, but it was moved to Orlando. It was previously leased by Cox Radio (Cox Media Group), and Clear Channel Communications (now iHeartMedia).

=== WLOQ Beautiful Music ===
From its lease from iHeartMedia in 2011 until February 2014, W273CA carried the smooth jazz format originally heard on 103.1 WLOQ. WLOQ was started by John T. Rutledge, who also owned 950 WLOF Orlando (now WORL). WLOQ went on the air in 1966, with the license held by the Carter Broadcasting Company. The station broadcast from a room at the Langford Hotel in Winter Park, Florida and the format was Beautiful Music, playing only instrumentals. The original format was designed by Rutledge who was very particular as to its adherence. The antenna was on a monopole on top of the hotel. All of the production, news and sales originated from the WLOF staff. Violet Jean Sidebottom was the manager of WLOQ and ran a tight ship. Rutledge appointed Jerry Reeves manager after Violet Sidebottom. The station is a Class A FM, licensed to Winter Park, stereo, dual-polarized antenna, with approximately 3,000 watts of power.

103.1 WLOQ was sold along with 970 WLOF c. 1972 to the Home Security Life Insurance Company, owned by the Gross Family. The call sign was retained after the purchase.

=== A New Home for Smooth Jazz ===
In 1977, WLOQ began moving to a format it called "Good Music" which was a forerunner of the Smooth Jazz sound, combining jazz and pop music. The Smooth Jazz format continued until 2011. In 2011, after CEO John Gross retired for medical reasons, WLOQ was sold to TTB Media Corporation. At midnight on August 1, WLOQ's smooth jazz format moved exclusively online to the website "WLOQ.com" (now defunct). The station on 103.1 changed its call letters to WHKQ (now WFYY), and began stunting with all Elvis Presley music as "Elvis 103.1." On August 3 that year, the station switched to Spanish language Top 40 as "KQ103."

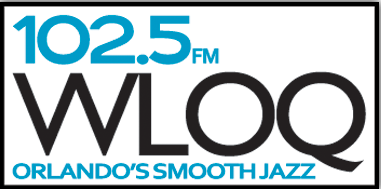
Former logo of the radio station

Later in August, the "WLOQ Smooth Jazz" branding was purchased by iHeartMedia, Inc. (formerly Clear Channel Communications). The WLOQ sound was revived on translator station 102.5 W273CA in Orlando, fed by the HD-2 signal of co-owned 107.7 WMGF. The programming came from Broadcast Architecture's syndicated Smooth Jazz Network, except for a local morning show hosted by Erica Lee, formerly of crosstown Hot AC WOMX 105.1. Lee's show debuted on June 3, 2013. The new "102.5 WLOQ" was a moderate ratings success. The HD2 rebroadcast that was heard on the translator was in mono instead of stereo, in which the translator was licensed.

=== Switch to Talk ===
In February 2014, W273CA switched from "Smooth Jazz WLOQ" (which continues on 107.7 WMGF-HD2) to a simulcast of talk-formatted WFLF 540 AM. WFLF was rebranded as "NewsRadio 102.5 WFLA," using the translator's dial position rather than the AM station's frequency of 540 kHz.

As of September 1, 2018, W273CA is no longer broadcasting WFLF (AM) due to the lease expiring for W273CA 102.5 FM between iHeartMedia and Central Florida Educational Association. The FM simulcast has since moved to W226BT on 93.1 FM.

=== Flip to Spanish Christian contemporary as "La Z 102.5" ===
On October 1, 2018, W273CA briefly stunted with a 1950s/60s oldies format for two days until the next day at 3:00 PM after the station ID, it began broadcasting a Spanish Christian music format as La Z 102.5, as a repeater of WPOZ-HD4. From September 3 to October 1, 2018, it still continued to broadcast WFLF's simulcast for unknown reasons despite the expiration of the lease between iHeartMedia and Central Florida Educational Foundation. Sometime in early or mid 2019, one of WPOZ's FM translators in Clermont switched from Christian-rock formatted "The Rock", and began simulcasting WPOZ-HD4 to extend the reach of "La Z".
