= List of children's radio networks =

Children's radio networks are radio networks which are targeted to children.

== Children's Radio Network ==
Children's Radio Network
- Founded: 1984 by William Osewalt
- Owner: William Osewalt

Children's Radio Network was the first children's radio network which went to the air twice. This radio network was targeted for toddlers (2-5) children (6-9) & teens (10-17) Children's Radio Network started broadcasting from its flagship station in Jacksonville in 1984. It was founded and funded by William Osewalt. The network built up to six affiliated stations. Osewalt ran into some personal financial problems, forcing a shutdown of the network in 1986.

Osewalt relaunched the network on WWTC in Minneapolis in May 1990 as Radio AAHS. As of May 1991, the network had no addition affiliates but expected to add some by the end of the year.

== Imagination Station Network ==
Imagination Station Network
- First air date: March 31, 1990
- Founded: 1988 by Matt Leibowitz
- Owner: Matt Leibowitz; Peter Yarrow; Metroplex Communications
- Established: 1988
- Former names: Kids' Choice Broadcasting Network

Imagination Station Network, also called Kids' Choice Broadcasting Network, was a children's radio network. Most of the programming was music with the rest being stories, call-ins from children and radio host chatter.

In 1988, Matt Leibowitz approached his friend Peter Yarrow about how a kid's radio network would be designed. They were initially joined by three other primary investors. Leibowitz became the network's chairman while Yarrow was appointed vice president for creative programming. Yarrow wrote and performed original music for the network, including the station's march song and theme songs for its seven daily program segments. He then moved into promoting the network and seeking investors. The network projected to have 100 affiliates at the end of its first year. WPRD station owner, Metroplex Communications, invested in the network.

Kids' Choice Broadcasting Network started broadcasting on March 31, 1990, on WPRD, its originating and only station. The network changed its name to match the branded name of its originating station, Imagination Station Network. A second affiliate, KSCO in Santa Cruz, signed up by September 1990. 20 stations were expected to affiliate by the end of the first year. The network added another affiliate in Salt Lake City, KKDS, which was an affiliate to the network's first sign off.

Audience-survey companies like Arbitron Ratings Co. rarely interview kids under age 12. With only two affiliates, the network did not attract national advertising, and thus lacked the funds to get more affiliates. Additional equity funding could not be found. On February 27, 1991, the Imagination Station Network stopped broadcasting. Metroplex withdrew as an investor from the network. However, KKDS continued using the Imagination Station format.

Grassroots efforts began with kids offering the station, WPRD, their piggy bank money. Two six-year-old girls set up a fundraising booth on their front lawn. The founder and president of the Orlando-based National Association for the Rights of Children, Bob McCarthy, teamed up with the network's former programming executives to bring a new children's radio network to Orlando. Leibowitz was still receiving forwards entries for the network's kid's club.

On April 1, 1991, a reorganized Imagination Station Network was launched by Leibowitz from WXJO-FM in St. Louis. Funding the relaunch network were the affiliates, WXJO and KKDS. WXJO used the moniker "Kids Radio" until it signed off as the final network station, when the FCC stalled in given approval for a license, in late first quarter 1992.

== Kidwaves Radio Network ==
Kidwaves Radio Network
- Headquarters: Philadelphia
- Owner: Ragan Henry
- Key people: Mel Diamond (President)

Kidwaves Radio Network was founded in 1989 by Marcia Moon and her partners. They intended to launch Kidwaves when 20 stations had signed on as affiliates. Kidwaves announced a launch date of April 1990; this was delayed until August. It was then pushed back to the summer of 1991. The only known affiliate was a station owned by Ragan Henry in Kansas City. As of 1991, they were still looking for additional affiliates.
