= Mike Bianchi =

American sports journalist

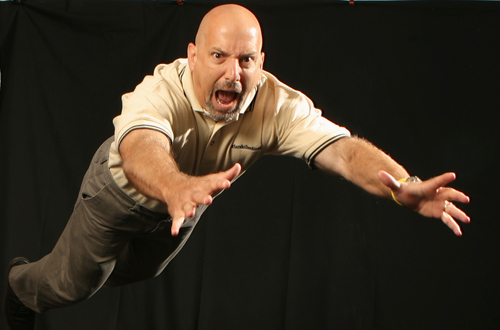
- Born: June 1, 1960 (age 66)
- Occupation: Sports columnist

Michael A. Bianchi (born c. 1960) is an American journalist and sports columnist at the Orlando Sentinel. He joined the Sentinel as a columnist in 2000 after working as the lead sports columnist at The Florida Times-Union in Jacksonville. Before the Times-Union, Bianchi worked at Florida Today in Cocoa Beach, where he wrote columns and covered athletics at the University of Florida.

In Orlando, he writes about the Orlando Magic, Orlando City Soccer Club, Florida Gators, Florida State Seminoles, University of Central Florida, NASCAR, the NBA, NFL and other sports and events. Bianchi has a weekday morning radio program in Orlando, Open Mike, on WYGM AM 740; the show focuses on sports in Central Florida and Florida.

== Awards ==
- 2002 First Place in Sports Reporting, for "Mike Bianchi's Road Trip," Orlando Sentinel, Society of Professional Journalists, Green Eyeshade Excellence in Journalism (work produced in 2001).
- 2009 Sunshine States Award for sports commentary, South Florida Society of Professional Journalists.
- 2013 Florida Sportswriter of the Year, National Sportscasters and Sportswriters Association (NSSA).
- 2013 Alumni of Distinction, University of Florida College of Journalism and Communications.

== Books ==
- Danny Wuerffel's tales from the Gator swamp: reflections of faith and football, co-author with Danny Wuerffel and Steve Spurrier. Sports Publications, 2004.
- Swampmeet: a Gator counting book, co-author with Marisol Novak and Andy Marlette. (Juvenile audience) Sports Publications, LLC, 2004.
- Gator alphabet: ABC, co-author with Marisol Novak and Andy Marlette. (Juvenile audience) Sports Publications, LLC, 2004.

== Personal ==
Bianchi was born in Gainesville, Florida; he received a Bachelors in Journalism from the University of Florida in 1985.
