= WYGM =

Sports radio station in Orlando, Florida

- Orlando, Florida; United States
- Broadcast area: Greater Orlando
- Frequency: 740 kHz
- Branding: 96.9 The Game

Programming
- Format: Sports
- Network: Fox Sports Radio
- Affiliations: ESPN Radio; Orlando Magic; UCF Knights; Orlando City; Tampa Bay Buccaneers

Ownership
- Owner: iHeartMedia; (iHM Licenses, LLC)
- Sister stations: W283AN; WFLF; WJRR; WMGF; WRSO; WRUM; WTKS-FM; WXXL

History
- First air date: February 8, 1947 (as WORZ)
- Former call signs: WORZ (1947–1957); WKIS (1957–1988); WWNZ (1988–2001); WQTM (2001–2009)
- Call sign meaning: "Game"

Technical information
- Licensing authority: FCC
- Facility ID: 51982
- Class: B
- Power: 50,000 watts
- Transmitter coordinates: 28°28′54″N 81°39′42.3″W
- Translators: 96.9 W245CL (Deltona, relays WJRR-HD2)
- Repeater: 101.1 WJRR-HD2 (Cocoa Beach)

Links
- Public license information: Public file; LMS
- Webcast: Listen live (via iHeartRadio)
- Website: 969thegame.iheart.com

WYGM (740 AM) is a commercial radio station in Orlando, Florida, United States. It is owned by iHeartMedia and airs a sports radio format. Programming is simulcast on FM translator station W245CL at 96.9 MHz in nearby Deltona, Florida, and uses its FM dial position in its moniker, "96.9 The Game". It is also heard on the HD2 channel of co-owned WJRR.

WYGM has studios and offices in iHeart's Orlando facility in Maitland. It operates at the maximum AM power permitted by the Federal Communications Commission, 50,000 watts at all times, but because AM 740 is a clear-channel Canadian frequency, reserved for Class A CFZM in Toronto, WYGM must use a directional antenna at night (to protect CFZM). By contrast, WYGM's translator operates at only 250 watts. WYGM's transmitter is off Tower Pine Drive in Winter Garden.

== Current programming ==
WYGM is an affiliate of Fox Sports Radio, which is syndicated by Premiere Networks, a subsidiary of WYGM's parent company, iHeartMedia. On weekdays, the station features several local shows, beginning with the morning drive time program Open Mike hosted by Mike "The Bulldog" Bianchi, a sports columnist for the Orlando Sentinel, and produced and co-hosted by Kelly "The Smooth Operator" Velez. For a time, the show was simulcast on WFXJ in Jacksonville. The simulcast ended in January 2021.

A late morning show titled The Beat of Sports is hosted by Marc Daniels, the radio voice of the UCF Knights. Bianchi and Daniels join for an hour long crossover show from 8:30 a.m. to 9:30 a.m. called The Bridge. Then Daniels takes over until noon. Chris Vazquez is the producer/co-host for The Beat of Sports.

Weekday afternoons feature The Herd with Colin Cowherd, followed by In The Zone with Brandon Kravitz. The Shot Doctor (Mike Josephs) was part of the show until his retirement in 2020. Tyler Caron currently serves as producer/co-host to 'In The Zone' The remainder of the nighttime and overnight hours, as well as the weekends, feature Fox Sports Radio syndicated programming and brokered programming as well as ESPN Radio.

WYGM is the flagship station for Orlando Magic basketball and the UCF Knights. It is also the Orlando radio affiliate for the Tampa Bay Buccaneers.

The station also airs Orlando Solar Bears games exclusively online via the iHeartRadio feed. WYGM is also the home of Orlando City soccer, however, many games air on sister station WTKS-FM.

== History ==
=== WORZ/WKIS/WWNZ ===
On February 8, 1947, the station signed on as WORZ. It originally broadcast with 1,000 watts and was a network affiliate of the NBC Radio Network. It carried NBC's schedule of dramas, comedies, news, sports, soap operas, game shows, and big-band broadcasts during the "Golden Age of Radio". In the 1960s as WKIS, the station was a full service middle of the road music station. In 1979, WKIS changed to a news/talk format.

In March 1988, the station was bought by Guy Gannett Communications, becoming an affiliate of the ABC Talk Radio Network and airing CBS Radio News, plus local news with an eleven person staff. The call sign changed to WWNZ ("Wins") on May 12, 1988. Gannett raised the power from 5KW non-directional day and 1KW 3 tower directional nights, to 50,000 watts both day and night from the new site in Lake County just outside Orange County. The new the site used 6 towers with one specially configured wagon wheel top array to better control the nighttime skywave.

Paxson Communications acquired the station in February 1992. Clive Thomas was the midday host, while Jim Philips was on in the afternoons.

=== WQTM: 540/740 "The Team" ===
WQTM debuted as a sports talk station, originally branded as "540 The Team", on January 2, 1995 on AM 540 in Orlando. The station officially changed its call letters to WQTM in the spring of 1996. In March 1998, Marc Daniels took over as program director, replacing Dick Sheetz. In January 2001, WQTM transitioned over to 740-AM by simulcasting on both frequencies for one month. Beginning in February 2001, the transition over to AM 740 was complete, and AM 540 became WFLF (NewsRadio 540 WFLA).

During its original run as a sport talk station, 740 The Team carried several local shows:

- The Dan Sileo Show from 6-9 a.m. from 2002-2007.
  - From 1995-1997, the morning show debuted featuring Jerry O'Neill and Greg Warmoth. For a brief time "Slats" replaced O'Neill, but O'Neill eventually returned.
  - From 1997-2000, the morning show starred Jerry O'Neill & The Shot Doctor. A third host, "Mandy" joined the duo for a period of time.
  - From 2000-2002, Pat Clarke and Charles Davis hosted the morning program.
- Keep 'N Score from 9-10 a.m. hosted by Orlando Sentinel columnists Jerry Greene, Mike Bianchi, Lynn Hoppes, and others.
- Coach and Company from 3-6 p.m. hosted by Marc Daniels, the voice of UCF Knights accompanied by then-Florida Gators reporter "Stunning" Steve Egan. "The Freak" Mark Lloyd was also part of the show through 2001, after which he left and joined the WWE announcing staff.
- The Finish Line from 6-9 p.m. hosted by Knights sideline reporter Jerry O'Neill along with The Shot Doctor and Mike Tuck.
- 740 The Team was also the Orlando affiliate of The Jim Rome Show, Fox Sports Radio, and NFL on Westwood One. Other shows carried on AM 540/740 over the years include The Fabulous Sports Babe The Tony Bruno Extravaganza, and a weekly show titled Speedway Today with Preston Root, from Daytona International Speedway, focusing on NASCAR and other forms of auto racing. Occasionally the station would pick up broadcasts from MRN, PRN, IMSRN, and Atlanta Braves baseball.

=== Format changes ===
On October 12, 2006, Clear Channel announced the dismissal of twelve-year program director, and show host Marc Daniels. The move was made as part of budget cuts. Steve Egan was also dismissed. Speculation in an Orlando Sentinel article suggested the station would possibly undergo a format change. On November 10, 2006, it was announced that WQTM's summer 2006 ratings fell to an average of 0.6 (84,000 listeners), falling behind competitor 1080 WHOO.

On October 1, 2007, WQTM changed its morning lineup. It dropped Keep 'N Score, a one-hour show hosted by Orlando Sentinel columnists which had run since April 2003, and Fox Sports Radio's Out of Bounds, in favor of the newly re-launched The Dan Patrick Show from 9 a.m. to noon.

In January 2008, further changes were made at 740 AM, and other Clear Channel-owned stations in the market. The frequency transitioned to a Spanish-language format, branded as La Preciosa 740. Pat Campbell was released from 540 WFLA's morning show. Dan Sileo's morning show was put in its place at 540, and it was simulcast on WDAE in Tampa as well. The Finish Line, sans Jerry O'Neill, also moved to 540 (taking the 6-9 p.m. timeslot). The Shot Doctor now hosted with Mike Tuck, while O'Neill left to join rival WHOO. The Jim Rome Show was picked up by WHOO, and the Tampa Bay Buccaneers affiliation switched to RealRadio 104.1.

=== WYGM 740 AM/96.9 FM "The Game" ===
After only one year as a Spanish-language format, Clear Channel announced on January 23, 2009, that AM 740 would return to the sports talk format. WQTM received new call letters WYGM, and began broadcasting on February 15, 2009. The station re-branded itself as "740 The Game" (the previous moniker "The Team" had been snagged during the sabbatical by WHOO), and resumed its affiliation with Fox Sports Radio. It also continued as the flagship for UCF, an affiliation that had been continuous throughout the Spanish-language format. During its first several months back as a sports talk format, WYGM aired programs such as The Dan Patrick Show, The Jim Rome Show, and Orlando Predators arena football.

In May 2009, The Dan Sileo Show transitioned back from 540 WFLA and became the 6-9 a.m. morning drive program. The Finish Line, however, did not return. Initially, The Shot Doctor was fired by Clear Channel and Mike Tuck moved to WHOO to reunite with Jerry O'Neill (Tuck and O'Neill). Later in the year, however, The Shot Doctor returned to WYGM to host a new show, titled The Sports Rx, from 3-6 p.m. with Brandon Kravitz.

In October 2010, Dan Sileo was dropped from WYGM to focus on the Tampa Bay market. He was soon replaced by Mike Bianchi in the 6-9 a.m. morning slot, in an effort to establish a more Orlando-centric morning show. Bianchi's show debuted, initially with co-host Brian Fritz, on November 15, 2010.

By 2012, original anchor Marc Daniels (who had spent time at WHOO), returned to AM 740, and started a new late morning program, The Beat of Sports, co-hosted for a time by Jerry Greene formerly of the Orlando Sentinel. It marked Greene's return to AM 740, after co-hosting Keep 'N' Score several years earlier. Greene died in 2016.

Previous logo

On October 1, 2015, WYGM began simulcasting on FM translator W246BO (moved from 97.1), transmitting from Deltona. The stations were rebranded as "96.9 The Game". The translator call sign later changed to W245CL. In 2010, WYGM began simulcasting on the HD3 subchannel of sister station WTKS-FM. On May 6, 2012, WYGM switched its HD Radio simulcast from WTKS-FM-HD3 to WJRR-HD2 with the demise of "Channel X".

In August 2017, Jerry O'Neill left WHOO and rejoined 740 The Game, reuniting with The Shot Doctor and they resumed their afternoon show The Finish Line. Brandon Kravitz moved to the morning show with Mike Bianchi.

In 2019, longtime host Jerry O'Neill retired from his program (The Finish Line), and also retired as a sideline reporter for UCF football. Brandon Kravitz, moved back to afternoons, re-joining The Shot Doctor in a revamped show titled In The Zone.

== FM translator ==
Broadcast translator for WJRR-HD2
Call sign	Frequency	City of license	FID	ERP (W)	HAAT	Class	Transmitter coordinates	FCC info
W245CL	96.9 FM	Deltona, Florida	146621	250	144 m (472 ft)	D	28°36′22.6″N 81°27′23.9″W	LMS
