= SBK Live =

Former radio show in Florida, USA

Facts
- Station ID: WTKS
- Channel: Real Radio 104.1FM
- Showtimes: Weeknights, 7-11pm

SBK Live was a talk radio show aired on WTKS-FM Real Radio in Orlando, Florida, United States.

The show originally ran on Real Radio 104.1 from 7 to 11 pm ET. The program was a mix of current events and upcoming artists. Guests included local and national celebrities. In October 2021, Soul Brother Kevin started a podcast called the SBK show.

== History ==
SBK Live was a part of Real Radio 104.1FM, WTKS-FM for four years. Despite its overwhelming success, the show was canceled, broadcasting for the last time on December 7, 2012.

== Cast ==
The show's cast members included:

=== SBK ===
Soul Brother Kevin started when morning talk show host Russ Rollins of The Monsters In The Morning put out a call that he needed a "Brother man from another land" to come and read part of a story for a bit in "an old time nignog voice". Kevin came in and originally objected to reading the script, but then he eventually gave in. As an avid listener he soon enrolled in the internship program and began working with The Monsters, then in middays. SBK left Real Radio 104.1 in 2014, after eight years with the station. He was soon hired by sister station 105.5 "The Beat", which was in Ft. Myers, where he was number one in evenings for two years straight.

=== Angel Rivera ===
Angel started at Real Radio 104.1 as an intern for the Philips Phile. On the Phile, he performed a stunt in which he posed an exchange student from the Commonwealth of Puerto Rico.

After Angel's internship, he began working for Clear Channel Orlando's Sports Talk Station, where he hosted his own auto enthusiast program called Hot Ride Radio. He also worked as an Assistant Promotions coordinator with one of Real Radio's sister stations. During this time, Angel frequently made guest appearances on Real Radio.

Angel became a permanent fixture on the Real Radio when he joined the SBK LIVE show on Saturday nights. Angel's love of music led to his own segment on SBK Live called, "What The Hell is Angel Listening To."

=== Cabin Boy ===
Cabin Boy, or "Matt", grew up in Pittsburgh. At the age of 18, Matt left home to attend Penn State University where he then studied journalism. After working in radio for five years, he became the producer and co-host of SBK Live.

== Segments ==
- What's Buzzin' on the Net with Angel - Nightly
- Tech Talk with Dirty Bird - Tuesdays, 8:15pm
- Sing Bitch - Wednesdays, 10pm
- Curtis Earth Trivia - Fridays, 10pm
- Beer of the Week - Fridays, 10pm featuring a different micro-brew every week

== Guests ==
- Attorney Steve Kramer
- Lady Raptastic
- Robert
- Dwight Howard
- Master Legend
- Kevin James
- Rico From Charlotte
