= WAMT =

- Pine Castle–Sky Lake, Florida; United States
- Broadcast area: Greater Orlando
- Frequency: 1190 kHz
- Branding: Family Radio

Programming
- Format: Christian radio
- Affiliations: Family Radio

Ownership
- Owner: Family Radio; (Loam Media, Inc.)

History
- First air date: January 28, 1977; 49 years ago
- Former call signs: WHHL (1977–1982); WREM (1982–1985); WWLD (1985–1987); WAJL (1987–2000); WIXL (2000–2004)

Technical information
- Licensing authority: FCC
- Facility ID: 15877
- Class: B
- Power: 4,700 watts days; 230 watts nights
- Transmitter coordinates: 28°28′1″N 81°22′28.3″W

Links
- Public license information: Public file; LMS
- Webcast: [ https://live.mystreamplayer.com/wamt Listen live]
- Website: www.familyradio.org

WAMT (1190 kHz) is a non-commercial AM radio station airing a Christian radio format. Licensed to Pine Castle–Sky Lake, Florida, it serves the Greater Orlando radio market. The station is owned and operated by Tennessee-based Family Radio and airs its network programming, featuring Christian music and music and Calvinist teaching.

By day, WAMT is powered at 4,700 watts non-directional. But 1190 AM is a clear channel frequency. So WAMT reduces power to 230 watts at night to minimize interference and uses a directional antenna with a two-tower array. The transmitter is on Dumont Avenue near East Lancaster Road in Pine Castle.

== History ==
The station signed on the air January 28, 1977. The call sign was WHHL and it aired an oldies format. It was powered at 1,000 watts and was a daytimer, required to go off the air at night. The studios were on Orange Blossom Trail in Orlando.

It later switched to a talk radio format. It featured programming from the CBS Radio Network, Fox News Radio, and Westwood One.

WAMT flipped to Spanish-language sports radio at the beginning of 2010.

On January 21, 2010, at 11:37 pm local time, its website address redirected all visitors to the website of then-sister station WHOO, which carried a sports radio format. In December 2011, ESPN Deportes Radio signed off from the station, and the station stunted for about a month, playing canned music and replays of old speeches.

Genesis Communications announced that it would sell WAMT and WHOO to Relevant Radio, a Catholic radio network based in Wisconsin. The sale was completed on August 14, 2018. In late 2018-early 2019, both WAMT and WHOO switched from their former formats to Catholic talk, branded as "Relevant Radio".

In 2021, Relevant Radio swapped WAMT to Family Radio's parent company, Family Stations, in exchange for WBMD in Baltimore, Maryland. The swap, which left WHOO as Relevant Radio's only Orlando station, allowed that network to enter Baltimore (where Family Radio also owned WFSI). At the same time, Family Radio was able to enter the Orlando market.
