= WRUM =

Latin pop radio station in Orlando, Florida

- Orlando, Florida; United States
- Broadcast area: Central Florida
- Frequency: 100.3 MHz (HD Radio)
- Branding: Rumba 100.3

Programming
- Language: Spanish
- Format: Latin pop–reggaeton–tropical music
- Subchannels: HD2: Mega 97.1 (Bilingual CHR); HD3: Retro 97.9 (Bilingual classic hits)

Ownership
- Owner: iHeartMedia; (iHM Licenses, LLC)
- Sister stations: W283AN; WFLF; WJRR; WMGF; WRSO; WTKS-FM; WXXL; WYGM

History
- First air date: June 26, 1950
- Former call signs: WORZ-FM (1950–1957); WKIS-FM (1957–1971); WDIZ (1971–1996); WSHE (1996–2004); WEBG (2004–2005)
- Call sign meaning: "Rumba"

Technical information
- Licensing authority: FCC
- Facility ID: 59976
- Class: C
- ERP: 100,000 watts
- HAAT: 484 meters (1,588 ft)
- Transmitter coordinates: 28°34′52″N 81°4′31.2″W
- Translators: HD2: 97.1 W246BT (Clermont); HD2: 97.1 W246CK (Kissimmee); HD3: 97.9 W250CE (Kissimmee)

Links
- Public license information: Public file; LMS
- Webcast: Listen live (via iHeartRadio); HD2: Listen live (via iHeartRadio); HD3: Listen live (via iHeartRadio)
- Website: rumba100.iheart.com; HD2: lamegaorlando.iheart.com; HD3: retro979.iheart.com

WRUM (100.3 FM) is a commercial radio station in Orlando, Florida, known as "Rumba 100.3". It airs a Spanish-language radio format featuring Latin pop and reggaeton. It is owned by iHeartMedia. The studios and offices are on Maitland Center Parkway in Maitland.

WRUM has an effective radiated power (ERP) of 100,000 watts, the maximum for most FM stations. The transmitter is in Bithlo, off Fort Christmas Road (Route 420).

WRUM broadcasts using the HD radio hybrid format. The HD2 subchannel carries a bilingual CHR format, known as "Mega 97.1". The subchannel feeds two FM translators at 97.1 MHz. The HD3 subchannel carries a bilingual classic hits format, known as "Retro 97.9".

== History ==
The station signed on the air on June 26, 1950. The call sign was WORZ-FM, originally simulcasting WORZ 740 AM (now WYGM). The call sign changed in 1957 to WKIS-AM-FM. The two stations were owned by Central Florida Broadcasting and were network affiliates of NBC Radio Network. They carried NBC's schedule of dramas, comedies, news, sports, soap operas, game shows, and big-band broadcasts during the "Golden Age of Radio".

In 1971, the simulcast ended as WKIS and WKIS-FM were sold to separate companies, with the FM station acquired by the Shamrock Development Company. The new management installed a progressive rock format, switching the call letters to WDIZ. Over time, the station's playlist focused on the top-selling albums and rock artists, as the station shifted to album-oriented rock. WDIZ would be among nearly fifteen Florida stations acquired by Paxson Communications in May 1996.

On June 18, 1996, the station began airing a female-oriented alternative rock and adult contemporary format branded as "She 100.3". Its callsign would change to WSHE (recently freed up by sister station 103.5 in Fort Lauderdale) in mid-August. Its format would be expanded to Panama City sister WEBZ in December, whose calls were changed to WSHF. San Antonio-based Clear Channel Communications (now iHeartMedia) acquired Paxson's stations in 1997.

As competitor WOCL shifted away from its long-standing oldies programming on April 8, 1999, Clear Channel moved to flip WSHE's format to fill that niche. On April 24, 1999, after playing R.E.M.'s It's the End of the World as We Know It (And I Feel Fine), the station began stunting at 11 p.m. with sounds of a department store that included occasional talking, typewriter noises, and telephones ringing. The following day, the station would begin playing music from the likes of The Beach Boys, The Beatles, and Elvis Presley as "Cool 105.9 FM".

On February 23, 2004, after stunting with the last two minutes of "Hey Jude" by The Beatles on a loop for an entire weekend, the station's call letters were then switched to WEBG and the format to classic hits as Big 100.3.

On February 2, 2005, the station flipped to a Spanish-language tropical music format. Over time, Latin pop and reggaeton were mixed into the playlist.

== HD subchannels ==
=== WRUM-HD2 ===
On April 19, 2017, WRUM's HD2 subchannel launched a bilingual CHR format, branded as Boom 97 Uno. It was simulcast on FM translators at 97.1 FM: W246BT in Clermont (about 20 miles west of Orlando), and W246CK in Kissimmee (a few miles south of Orlando). However, due to a trademark claim by Radio One (which uses the "Boom" brand for its classic hip hop stations), the HD2 subchannel and FM translators were rebranded as Oi2 97 Uno (pronounced "Oidos") on May 4, 2017. On February 8, 2018, WRUM-HD2 became Mega 97.1.

=== WRUM-HD3 ===
From September 2018 until July 2024, WRUM’s HD3 subchannel simulcasted WRSO 810 AM, which currently broadcasts a sports radio format, until the simulcast moved to sister station WXXL, where the stations’ respective HD3 subchannels swapped formats, with the bilingual classic hits "Retro" national feed that aired on WXXL’s HD3 subchannel moving to WRUM’s HD3 subchannel and simulcasting on the FM translator as "Retro 97.9".

=== Translators ===
Broadcast translators for WRUM-HD2
Call sign	Frequency	City of license	FID	ERP (W)	HAAT	Class	Transmitter coordinates	FCC info
W246BT	97.1 FM	Clermont, Florida	151735	27	78 m (256 ft)	D	28°33′12″N 81°36′0.3″W	LMS
W246CK	97.1 FM	Kissimmee, Florida	146627	250	103 m (338 ft)	D	28°22′2.1″N 81°23′12.1″W	LMS

Broadcast translator for WRUM-HD3
Call sign	Frequency	City of license	FID	ERP (W)	HAAT	Class	Transmitter coordinates	FCC info
W250CE	97.9 FM	Kissimmee, Florida	156694	250	119 m (390 ft)	D	28°22′2″N 81°23′12.3″W	LMS
