= WRSO =

Radio station in Orlo Vista–Orlando, Florida

- Orlo Vista, Florida; United States
- Broadcast area: Greater Orlando
- Frequency: 810 kHz
- Branding: Fox Sports Radio AM 810

Programming
- Language: English
- Format: Sports
- Affiliations: Fox Sports Radio

Ownership
- Owner: Star Over Orlando, Inc.
- Operator: iHeartMedia
- Sister stations: W283AN; WFLF; WJRR; WMGF; WRUM; WTKS-FM; WXXL; WYGM

History
- First air date: January 2006 (as WEUS)
- Former call signs: WEUS (2002–2012)

Technical information
- Licensing authority: FCC
- Facility ID: 129548
- Class: D
- Power: 2,000 watts day 21 watts night
- Transmitter coordinates: 28°34′12″N 81°26′0″W
- Repeater: 106.7 WXXL-HD3 (Orlando)

Links
- Public license information: Public file; LMS
- Webcast: Listen live (via iHeartRadio)
- Website: fsrorlando.iheart.com

WRSO (810 AM) is a radio station licensed to Orlo Vista, Florida, serving the Orlando area. The station is owned by Star Over Orlando and operated by iHeartMedia under a local marketing agreement. The station broadcasts sports talk with programming from Fox Sports Radio.

== History ==
=== WEUS ===
The station signed on in January 2006 as WEUS with an oldies format, filling a void created when Clear Channel's WEBG flipped from oldies to a Spanish-language format over a year earlier. WEUS was running Scott Shannon's "True Oldies Channel" format via satellite through automation. WEUS was also the flagship station for Mike Harvey's syndicated Supergold program, which is based in Orlando. On June 1, 2008, about six months after oldies returned to FM (when WOCL resumed carrying the format), the station changed ownership, as well as formats. The new ownership, Communicomm Corporation of America, was running a hybrid religious format in place of the syndicated oldies format. As such, the station's original big810.com website had been taken offline.

Communicom Corporation eventually broke its lease-management agreement with Star Over Orlando as Communicom's poor business practices resulted on a loss of over $500,000 over an 18-month period. Effective February 1, 2010, the station resumed operation under the management team of owner Carl Como Tutera and Carmine Tutera.

The station began reimaging itself as a local-oriented hot talk station in mid-2010. During this phase, "The Mancow Experience," "The Ed Tyll Show", "The Shannon Burke Show", "The Doc Show" with former WXXL morning host Doc Holliday; Alex Jones, "The Todd Schnitt Show, "The Free Radicals" with hosts Whit Kincaid and John Kurtz; "The Train Wreck with Tim Vestite"; "The Nick and Artie Lange Show" and "The Phil Hendrie Show" all aired on the station at one time or another. WEUS also aired "The People Power Revolution with George Crossley & John Hamilton" until Crossley's death in September 2010. The station aired a growing number of locally based programs throughout the weekend, including "Out N About" (later The Qiew), which was a two-hour program targeting the LGBT communities in Central Florida. The station also aired "The Spry Show", "Alt.Classics," the only classic alternative, indie, punk and new wave music program on Central Florida radio, as well as "The Nick Carioti Show" which discusses real estate, business and politics. Throughout some of this time, the station also played a satellite-based oldies music feed during off peak hours on the weekends.

In early 2011, the station began a billboard campaign touting its talk lineup, including a controversial billboard showing Shannon Burke holding a smoking microphone with the slogan "Listen or Else." This caused a stir amongst local women's abuse groups due to an incident wherein Burke accidentally discharged a gun in his home; the bullet hit his dog and grazed his wife's head. Burke and the station insisted that the smoking microphone (an Electro-Voice RE20 which in no way resembles a gun) referenced the "hot talk" on Burke's show. Clear Channel Outdoor had placed a number of the billboards before removing the Burke boards due to apparent pressure from local groups. A reworked image appeared on CBS billboards.

With the demise of smooth jazz WLOQ, WEUS was one of the last of the independently owned radio stations in the Central Florida market.

=== WRSO ===
On May 31, 2012, MultiCorp International, Inc./XTend Medical Corporation announced plans to acquire WEUS by entering into a lease marketing agreement (LMA), and purchasing the station within two years from Star Over Orlando. On June 8, 2012, WEUS changed their call letters to WRSO. The station changed to a sports format when the new ownership started on July 30, 2012. When the station re-formatted, Doc Holliday's show became "The Doc Show on Sports".

On January 2, 2013, new management of WRSO re-launched as "810 CBS Sports Radio Orlando", picking up CBS Sports Radio, with Doc Holliday's show from 10 A.M.-Noon weekdays. This switch coincided with the shift of The Jim Rome Show from syndication through Premiere Radio Networks to being a component of CBS Sports Radio, resulting in the show moving to WRSO from WYGM.

In September 2013, Star Over Orlando took back control and operation of the station after MultiCorp International/Rivalz Sports Group apparently ended the lease management agreement. Star Over Orlando also announced that they had received FCC approval to double the daytime power and increase the night-time power from 400 watts to 1,000 watts, and that WRSO also will be operating a translator on 93.1 with 250 watts in Orlando. The station remained a CBS Sports affiliate.

On March 1, 2016, WRSO changed its format to feature Brazilian music and talk, including local shows and programming broadcast by the Grupo Bandeirantes owned-and-operated radio stations in Brazil, aimed to Brazilians who visit the Orlando parks and for the Portuguese speakers living in the Orlando area. Under this format, WRSO was operated by Cafifa Media Group in partnership with the Bandeirantes Communication Group under a local marketing agreement.

WRSO has filed an application for a Federal Communications Commission construction permit to decrease the day power to 2,500 watts and decrease the night power to 24 watts from a new transmitter site. The application was accepted for filing on May 24, 2016.

On September 3, 2018, WRSO ended the Brazilian format and began carrying a Spanish-language news/talk, branded as "Acción 97.9" and operated by iHeartMedia under an LMA. Concurrently, one of WRSO's FM translators, W226BT (93.1), began to carry the English-language conservative talk programming of iHeart-owned WFLF.

On February 16, 2024, after five years as part of the Acción Radio Network, WRSO changed formats from Spanish talk to sports, branded as "Fox Sports Radio AM 810 and FM 97.9".

A few months later in July of that year, WRSO’s simulcast on WRUM-HD3 moved to WXXL’s HD3 subchannel, with both subchannels swapping programming. The FM simulcast of the station ceased to exist as a result, with its former FM translator 97.9 W250CE continuing to simulcast WRUM-HD3 as “Retro 97.9.”
