= WOCL =

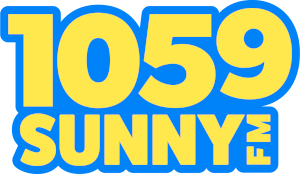
- DeLand, Florida; United States
- Broadcast area: Greater Orlando–Central Florida
- Frequency: 105.9 MHz (HD Radio)
- Branding: 105-9 Sunny FM

Programming
- Language: English
- Format: Classic hits
- Subchannels: HD2: Westwood One Sports; HD3: Caribbean Music

Ownership
- Owner: Audacy, Inc.; (Audacy License, LLC)
- Sister stations: WOMX-FM; WJHM

History
- First air date: July 10, 1967
- Former call signs: WOOO-FM (1967–1970); WDLF (1971–1974); WELE-FM (1974–1986)
- Call sign meaning: "Orlando's Class" (former format)

Technical information
- Licensing authority: FCC
- Facility ID: 10138
- Class: C
- ERP: 100,000 watts
- HAAT: 484 meters (1,588 ft)
- Transmitter coordinates: 28.920°N 81.319°W
- Translator: HD3: 93.5 W228DF (Orlando)

Links
- Public license information: Public file; LMS
- Webcast: Listen live (via Audacy)
- Website: audacy.com/1059sunnyfm oneloveradio.com (HD3)

WOCL (105.9 FM "Sunny FM") is a commercial radio station, licensed to DeLand, Florida, and serving Greater Orlando and Central Florida. It is owned by Audacy, Inc., and airs a classic hits radio format, focusing on the hits from the 1980s but with some 90s and 2000s titles as well. The station's studios and offices are on Pembrook Drive in Maitland.

WOCL has an effective radiated power (ERP) of 100,000 watts, the maximum for non-grandfathered FM stations. The transmitter is on Miller Road in Orange City, Florida.

== History ==
=== Country (1967–1986) ===
On July 10, 1967, the station signed on the air. It was a country music station with a limited signal. The original call sign was WOOO-FM, which changed to WDLF three years later. It was sold in 1977 and re-branded as WELE-FM as a sister station of WELE (1590 AM) in South Daytona, Florida.

=== Oldies (1986–1999) ===
In 1986, the format was shifted to oldies and the call sign changed to WOCL. Initially called "Class 105.9", it was renamed "Cool 105.9" in February 1988.

=== Rhythmic oldies (1999–2000) ===
On April 8, 1999, at 6 pm, the oldies format was moved to WSHE at 100.3 and called Cool 100. (That station has since been reformatted to Latin pop and become Rumba 100.3 with new call letters WRUM.) 105.9, meanwhile, was changed to Jammin' Oldies, a fad format at the time, and re-branded Power 105.9.

In September 2000, as part of AMFM Media's merger with Clear Channel, WOCL was sold off to Infinity Broadcasting (renamed CBS Radio in 2005). By this time, the Jammin' Oldies format had entered a period of decline.

=== Alternative rock (2000–2008) ===
O-Rock 105.9 logo used from October 31, 2000, until January 4, 2008. The logo would later be in use again after O-Rock returned on WOCL-HD2.

Between October 31, 2000, and January 4, 2008, the station played alternative rock, known as O-Rock 105.9. Following Clear Channel dropping The Howard Stern Show from its stations across the country (including WTKS-FM in Orlando, WOCL began airing the show in morning drive.

Two talk shows, The Morning After Show and The Jody & Scott Show were turned into music-only shows in mid-2007.

=== Classic hits (2008–present) ===
Sunny 105.9 logo used from 2008 to 2010.

Without warning, at 9:00 am on January 4, 2008, after playing "Down" by 311, WOCL dismissed its on-air staff and began stunting with Bill Drake's The History of Rock & Roll program. During this time, WOCL's webpage displayed a banner with pictures revolving between country music stars, classical figures such as Beethoven, smooth jazz icons such as Kenny G, and sports icons.

At 12:40 pm on January 10, 2008, the station began playing a year-by-year montage of snippets of popular culture (including movies, commercials, and of course, hit music) and news stories covering the years from 1965 to 1989. This montage was similar to the one played by WCBS-FM in New York City when that station relaunched its oldies/classic hits format in July 2007, and almost exactly the same one that would be used by classic hits convert WJMK in Chicago in March 2011. At 1:05:09 pm, WOCL re-launched with a Classic hits format, branded as Sunny 105-9. It features a playlist and imaging that closely resembles that of WCBS-FM in New York City. The first song played on "Sunny 105.9" was "That's The Way I Like It" by the Florida-based group KC and the Sunshine Band.

The shift left WJRR as Orlando's only alternative rock station, although WJRR transitioned back to active rock in 2011 because of panel changes on Nielsen BDS. (Alternative would make two subsequent comebacks on analog Orlando radio - first at 107.3 FM from June 2014 to February 2016, then on sister station 101.9 WQMP from November 2017 to August 2024.) O-Rock 105.9 returned as an HD2 channel in April 2008, restoring its modern rock format.

In February 2010, WOCL modified its moniker to 105-9 Sunny FM, focusing on music from 1970 (with a few songs per day from the 1960s) to 1989, with the core being the late 1970s and 1980s, with even some 1990s.

=== Entercom/Audacy ownership ===
On February 2, 2017, CBS Radio announced it would merge with Entercom. The merger was approved on November 9, 2017, and was consummated on November 17.

In 2018, the station changed its slogan to "We Own the 80s", and also updated its logo. The station tweaked its format, dropping all 1960s music, and most music before 1975. The station's playlist is mostly 1980s music with some 1970s and 1990s songs. In 2020, WOCL adopted the slogan "Nobody Plays More 80s".

On March 30, 2021, Entercom rebranded as Audacy, Inc.

Sometime in the fall of 2022, the station increased its 1970s and 1990s output and added some early 2000s music, which was limited in the 2010s. By that time, the station quietly tweaked its slogan from "Your Home of the 80s" to "Your Home of the 70s, 80s, and 90s".

Ratings would severely take a downturn quickly with the playlist adjustment. As a result, in early 2023, the station tweaked its playlist again to heavily feature 1980s hits, but still included some 1990s and 2000s hits while phasing out all 1970s hits, with a new slogan, "Orlando's Hottest Classic Hits". This bolstered the station's Nielsen ratings and landed it back in the top two stations in Orlando.

As of January 2026 the station airs the Rick Stacy Morning Show, a locally hosted conservative talk show, hosted by Rick Stacy, Jill Bucco and Smokestack. James Steele hosts afternoons. Middays, nights and locally scheduled weekend hours are the automated Classic Hits playlist with no on-air personalities. Saturday mornings include the syndicated Casey Kasem's American Top 40: The 80s and Sunday mornings include the syndicated Rewind with Gary Bryan.

== WOCL-HD2 ==
WOCL's former modern rock format "O-Rock" aired on WOCL's HD2 subchannel from 2008 until 2019. That format stayed in place even after sister station WQMP switched to alternative rock in November 2017. A simulcast of New York sports radio station WFAN moved from 105.9 HD3 to 105.9 HD2 to accommodate the playlist overlap with WQMP and move of regional Mexican-formatted "Ok 93.5" from WOTW-HD3. In early 2020, Entercom switched the feed of 105.9 HD2 from the WFAN simulcast to the national CBS Sports Radio (now Westwood One Sports) feed.

== WOCL-HD3 ==
WOCL is the current originating station of Caribbean-formatted "One Love Radio". WOCL-HD3 is rebroadcast onto FM translator W228DF, heard on 93.5 MHz.

Broadcast translator for WOCL-HD3
Call sign	Frequency	City of license	FID	ERP (W)	HAAT	Class	Transmitter coordinates	FCC info
W228DF	93.5 FM	Orlando, Florida	156373	240	121 m (397 ft)	D	28°32′29″N 81°30′39″W	LMS
