= WPRD =

- Winter Park, Florida; United States
- Broadcast area: Orlando
- Frequency: 1440 kHz

Programming
- Format: Spanish language variety

Ownership
- Owner: J & V Communications, Inc.

History
- Former call signs: WABR (1954–1971); WBJW (1971–1975); WNBE (1975–1977); WAJL (1977–1987); WPRD (1987–1993); WWZN (1993–1994)

Technical information
- Licensing authority: FCC
- Facility ID: 29341
- Class: B
- Power: 5,000 watts (day); 1,000 watts (night)
- Transmitter coordinates: 28°35′19″N 81°22′52.3″W
- Repeaters: WOTS 1220 kHz, Kissimmee; WSDO 1400 kHz, Sanford

Links
- Public license information: Public file; LMS
- Website: Official website

WPRD (1440 AM) is a radio station broadcasting a Spanish-language variety format. Licensed to Winter Park, Florida, United States, WPRD is owned and operated by J & V Communications, Inc.

WPRD serves as the main flagship station for J & V Communications, Inc. and is headquartered in Orlando, Florida, in the same building previously occupied by former stations WABR and WBJW (the latter now WOMX-FM).

Some programming on WPRD is repeated on WOTS 1220 kHz in Kissimmee, WSDO 1400 kHz in Sanford, WTJV 1490 kHz in DeLand, and WUNA 1480 kHz in Ocoee. WPRD also shares programming with Puerto Rican station WCMN.

== History ==
Following the demise of WAJL, WPRD started broadcasting on the same 1440 frequency as "Pride 1440", playing music from the 1940s through the 1960s.

Kids' Choice Broadcasting Network, later Imagination Station Network, started broadcasting on March 31, 1990, on WPRD as its originating station. During this time the station used the moniker "The Imagination Station". Station owner, Metroplex Communications, invested in the network. In September, the station sponsored a concert for the one year anniversary of non-profit Arnold Palmer Hospital for Children and Women featuring Peter Yarrow, a network vice president and investor.

On February 27, 1991, the Imagination Station Network stopped broadcasting on the station. At 2 p.m. that day, the station changed over to all-news with the CNN Headline News service. About 100 calls were received by the station regarding the discontinuation of the network on the station.

For a brief period in 1993, the call sign were changed to WWZN before reverting to WPRD.

Since the mid-1990s, WPRD has been owned by J & V Communications, Inc. and started broadcasting in a Spanish-language variety format under "La Fantastica 1440". The name was later changed to "La Voz 1440" in late 2014, as it remains known to this day.
