= WPYO =

Spanish-language contemporary hit radio station in Orlando, Florida

Coordinates: 28.574444°N 81.462583°W

- Maitland, Florida; United States
- Broadcast area: Greater Orlando
- Frequency: 95.3 MHz (HD Radio)
- Branding: El Zol 95.3

Programming
- Language: Spanish
- Format: Contemporary hit radio
- Subchannels: HD2: Regional Mexican “La Privada” HD3: Salsa “Salsa 95.3 HD3“

Ownership
- Owner: Spanish Broadcasting System; (WPYO Licensing, Inc.)
- Sister stations: Tampa; WSUN; Miami; WSBS-TV; WRMA; WXDJ; WRAZ-FM; WCMQ-FM; WMFM

History
- First air date: September 1, 1968
- Former call signs: WTLN-FM (1968–1999)
- Call sign meaning: "Party Orlando" (former branding)

Technical information
- Facility ID: 1186
- Class: C3
- ERP: 12,000 watts
- HAAT: 144 metres (472 ft)

Links
- Website: WPYO Online; WPYO-HD2 Online; WPYO-HD3 Online

WPYO (95.3 FM), is a commercial radio station licensed to Maitland, Florida. The station airs a Spanish-language contemporary hits format, and is branded as El Zol 95.3. Owned by Spanish Broadcasting System, it serves the Greater Orlando area. The station's transmitter is located in Pine Hills.

== History ==
Prior to Cox Enterprises buying the station in 1999, the station was WTLN-FM, a contemporary Christian outlet. But after the sale that same year, on January 15, at 5 p.m., it flipped to dance Top 40 as 95.3 Party"WPYO 95.3 Apopka Orlando February 2001"., and became a success in the market with its mix of dance and hip-hop music. By 2004, the station had shifted to a hip-hop-driven direction, and rebranded as rhythmic contemporary Power 95.3, restoring the format to Orlando since the flip of WJHM to urban contemporary in the 1990s (WJHM returned to rhythmic in 2012, but changed to contemporary hit radio in 2014).

On April 27, 2018, WPYO flipped to CHR, maintaining the Power branding and some of its airstaff. The change came in response to WQMP (now WJHM)'s recent flip to alternative rock, which briefly gave WXXL a monopoly in the format within the Orlando market.

In 2019, Cox Media Group transferred WPYO, along with Tampa Bay sister station WSUN, to CXR Radio, LLC, a divestiture trust run by Elliot B. Evers. The transfer followed the sale of the remainder of Cox Media Group from Cox Enterprises to Apollo Global Management; Cox had owned five FM stations in Orlando, one over the FCC limit of four, and the sale eliminated this grandfathered status.

On February 9, 2022, Spanish Broadcasting System (SBS) announced it would purchase WPYO and WSUN from CXR Radio for $12.5 million. The deal marks SBS’ entry into both markets. A version of the Power format without on-air personalities moved to one of WCFB's HD Radio subchannels, running as a commercial-free stream through the station's former app and website under the rebranded name "Power Orlando". The flip left WXXL as the only CHR station remaining in the Orlando-Winter Haven market until country station WOTW flipped to rhythmic contemporary as WFYY in August 2022 (that station flipped to talk radio as "Florida Man Radio" in March 2024, due to low ratings, and was later sold to Norsan Media and now broadcasts a tropical music format as "Kaliente 103.1").

On the station's final day as "Power", the station paid tribute to the run of "Power" and "Party" with an all-day live broadcast from 5:30 a.m. to midnight deemed "The Last Damn Show", where longtime listeners and former DJs dating back to the days of "Party" called in the station to give their personal station memories and give their own final farewell; in addition, the station would give a final run-through of their playlist, playing music through the day from each era of the station (from the dance music of "Party" to the hip-hop and pop music of "Power"). At midnight on April 1, after the entire airstaff gave one final goodbye before playing "Raise The Roof" by Uncle Luke (the first song that played on the station when it launched as "Party"; this was immediately followed by a final station identification and the playing of a final bumper for "Party" and one for "Power", which would fade out on an echo effect, followed by a moment of silence), the station flipped to a temporary simulcast of former sister station WDBO. On April 29, SBS officially closed on their purchase of WPYO; around 9 a.m. that day, the station began stunting with a loop of songs featured in their new Spanish-language contemporary hits format, which debuted May 9, at 6 a.m. as "El Zol 95.3", with "El Incomprendido" by Farruko being the first song played.

== HD subchannels ==
=== WPYO-HD2 ===
On August 29, 2024, WPYO added an HD2 subchannel for the first time, initially simulcasting the main analog/HD1 feed with a slight delay. WPYO never had an HD sub channel beyond its main HD1 during its Cox Radio and CXR Radio, LLC ownership. On September 12, at 11:53 p.m., in the middle of playing "Tengo un Plan (Remix)" by Key-Key & Ozuna, SBS officially launched "Salsa 95.3 HD2" on the subchannel, originally simulcasting Miami sister station WRAZ. The first song on "Salsa" was "Aguanilé" by Marc Anthony. On or around February 25, 2025, the "La Privada" programming originally on WPYO-HD3 relocated to WPYO-HD2 (replacing "Salsa 95.3 HD2", which remains online and also relocated to WPYO-HD3).

=== WPYO-HD3 ===
In February 2025, WPYO added an HD3 subchannel, originally broadcasting SBS’ Regional Mexican-formatted “La Privada” network, simulcasting KLAX-HD2 Los Angeles. Later that month by the 25th, the "La Privada" programming moved to WPYO's HD2 subchannel and the HD3 subchannel began broadcasting the “Salsa” programming originally on the HD2 subchannel.
