= WXXL =

Contemporary hit radio station in Tavares, Florida

- Tavares, Florida; United States
- Broadcast area: Greater Orlando • Central Florida
- Frequency: 106.7 MHz (HD Radio)
- Branding: XL1067

Programming
- Language: English
- Format: Contemporary hit radio
- Subchannels: HD2: LGBTQ "Pride Radio"; HD3: Simulcast of Sports radio "FOX Sports 810 AM" (WRSO)
- Affiliations: Premiere Networks

Ownership
- Owner: iHeartMedia; (iHM Licenses, LLC)
- Sister stations: W283AN; WFLF; WJRR; WMGF; WRSO; WRUM; WTKS-FM; WYGM

History
- First air date: March 12, 1969; 57 years ago
- Former call signs: WLBE-FM (1969–1975); WDGM (1975–1977); WHLY (1977–1987); WCAT-FM (1987–1988); WHLY (1988–1990)
- Call sign meaning: XXL, abbreviation for "Double Extra Large"

Technical information
- Licensing authority: FCC
- Facility ID: 29569
- Class: C1
- ERP: 100,000 watts
- HAAT: 251 meters (823 ft)
- Transmitter coordinates: 28°33′32″N 81°35′37.3″W

Links
- Public license information: Public file; LMS
- Webcast: Listen live (via iHeartRadio); Listen live (via iHeartRadio) (HD2)
- Website: xl1067.iheart.com; prideradioorlando.iheart.com (HD2)

WXXL (106.7 FM, "XL1067") is a commercial radio station licensed to Tavares, Florida, and serving the Greater Orlando - Central Florida radio market. The station airs a contemporary hit radio format and is owned by iHeartMedia. The studios and offices on Maitland Center Drive in Maitland.

WXXL has an effective radiated power (ERP) of 100,000 watts. The transmitter is on Story Road at Veterans Memorial Park in Winter Garden.

== History ==
WXXL first began broadcasting in 1969, under the call sign WLBE-FM, as an MOR-format radio station. It was the sister station of WLBE (790 AM), also licensed to Leesburg. In 1977, the station was known as Y-106 broadcasting an adult contemporary format. The station first gained notice as a Top 40 radio station by the fall of 1984, as Leesburg-licensed WHLY-FM, still using the moniker Central Florida's Y-106. Shortly afterward, WDBO became an adult contemporary station. Among the personalities at the station in this era were Shadow, who hosted a music-intensive morning show, and program director Rick Stacy, now at WOCL.

By 1987, adult-focused Top 40 WBJW (BJ105) remained the ratings and revenue leader in Orlando, and Y-106 was still viewed as a teen and young-adult station. This resulted in the shift in call letters to WCAT-FM and the nickname The Cat, in a failed attempt to woo older listeners. The WHLY call letters later returned, but the damage had been done. Furthermore, the rise of dance music, early hip-hop, hair bands and adult rock compounded the station's struggles. The station changed to the WXXL callsign on January 14, 1990, and later became Central Florida's dominant CHR station.

Former logo (1990–2007)

The original morning show on WXXL was Doc and Johnny in the Morning, later The XL Morning Zoo with Doc and Johnny, hosted by Jeffrey "Doc Holliday" Duncan and Johnny Magic. The morning show was a staple of the station from 1990 through 2007, when Doc resigned and jumped to Cox Radio, initially taking over the morning show at WWKA before hosting a talk radio show on WRSO.

Today, WXXL continues to be a successful contemporary hit radio serving Central Florida. The station's morning show (known as "Johnny's House") is still currently hosted by Johnny Magic, and the station continues to have a large amount of local talent employed, unlike other iHeart-owned contemporary hit stations which heavily rely on syndicated programming.
