= WTKS-FM =

Talk/alternative rock radio station in Cocoa Beach–Orlando, Florida

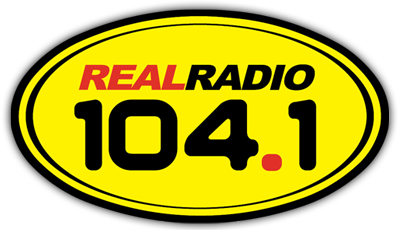

- Cocoa Beach, Florida; United States
- Broadcast area: Central Florida; Greater Orlando
- Frequency: 104.1 MHz (HD Radio)
- Branding: Real Radio 104.1

Programming
- Format: Hot talk (weekdays); Alternative rock (late nights and weekends)
- Subchannels: HD2: 104.5 The Beat (Mainstream urban); HD3: 104.1 The Pirate (country)

Ownership
- Owner: iHeartMedia, Inc.; (iHM Licenses, LLC)
- Sister stations: WFLF, WJRR, WMGF, WRSO, WRUM, WXXL, WYGM

History
- First air date: May 6, 1962; 64 years ago
- Former call signs: WRKT-FM (1962–1967); WKPE (1967–1977); WRKT (1977–1981); WSSP (1981–1992); WZTU (1992); WHVE (1992); WWNZ-FM (1992–1993); WTKS (1993–2002)
- Call sign meaning: "Talks"

Technical information
- Licensing authority: FCC
- Facility ID: 53457
- Class: C
- ERP: 100,000 watts
- HAAT: 487 meters (1,598 ft)
- Transmitter coordinates: 28.581111°N 81.075333°W
- Translator: HD2: 104.5 W283AN (Altamonte Springs)

Links
- Public license information: Public file; LMS
- Webcast: Listen Live; HD3: Listen Live
- Website: realradio.iheart.com; HD3: 1041thebear.iheart.com

WTKS-FM (104.1 MHz) is a commercial radio station licensed to Cocoa Beach, Florida, and serving Central Florida and Greater Orlando. It broadcasts a hybrid hot talk and alternative rock radio format. The station is owned and operated by iHeartMedia, Inc., with studios and offices is in Maitland, Florida.

WTKS-FM has an effective radiated power (ERP) of 100,000 watts, the maximum permitted for non-grandfathered FM stations. The transmitter tower is off Fort Christmas Road in Bithlo, Florida. WTKS-FM broadcasts using HD Radio technology. The HD2 digital subchannel carries a mainstream urban format known as "104.5 The Beat", which feeds FM translator W283AN at 104.5 MHz.

== Programming ==
On weekdays, WTKS-FM broadcasts hot talk shows, aimed at a more youthful audience than would usually listen to conventional talk radio shows. Weekdays begin with "Monsters in the Morning", followed by "The News Junkie", "The Jim Colbert Show", "A Corporate Time with Tom & Dan" and "Real Laughs". From 10 p.m. to early morning, WTKS-FM switches to alternative rock. Weekends also feature alternative rock, with some specialty shows on Sunday mornings and evenings.

Parent company iHeartMedia had picked some shows from WTKS-FM as part of XM Radio's Extreme XM channel 152. That service was discontinued in 2008.

== History ==
The station first signed on the air on May 6, 1962. WRKT-FM originally had an automated beautiful music format, and was the sister station to WRKT (1300 AM, now WKQK). The station was owned by C. Sweet Smith. It played quarter hour sweeps of mostly instrumental cover versions of popular songs, as well as Broadway and Hollywood show tunes.

In 1967, the station changed formats to progressive rock with the new call sign WKPE. The station was initially automated, but eventually added live announcers. WKPE reverted to the WRKT call letters in 1977 with a Top 40 format as "Rocket 104", then shifting its format to adult contemporary in 1980.

Guy Gannett purchased WRKT-FM in 1981 with the intent of upgrading the 30,000-watt station to 100,000 watts from a new tower near Bithlo. The more powerful relocated tower would allow the station to serve the lucrative Orlando radio market. The call letters were changed that year to WSSP. A beautiful music format was planned, but WSSP initially adopted a country music format as Brevard's Stereo Country 104. The country format was a temporary measure until the upgrade of the station's signal could be finalized.

The move to Bithlo was completed in 1985, and WSSP became beautiful music WSSPer 104 ("whisper"). For a number of years, "WSSPer" was one of the most popular radio stations in Orlando, often ranking as the #1 station in the Arbitron ratings and posting shares as high as 17% in certain dayparts. However, by the early 1990s, the station's ratings were down, and after stunting with a robotic countdown, WSSP switched to a hot AC format as WZTU, U104.1, on May 3, 1991, in the hopes of raising ratings and revenue. "U104.1" failed miserably. Later that year, Gannett sold its radio stations in Orlando and Miami to concentrate on its television properties. WZTU was acquired by Paxson Communications Corporation, headed by Lowell "Bud" Paxson (founder of the Home Shopping Network and later PAX TV). After stunting with yet another robotic countdown, Paxson switched WZTU to CHR as WHVE "One Hundred-Four One, The Wave", at 7:45 a.m. on May 29, but despite the programming expertise of Bill Pasha of WAPE-FM in Jacksonville, ratings and revenues did not increase; the station came in 14th place in its first ratings book. "The Wave" format was dropped on August 17, 1992, after only just three months.

WHVE then changed its calls to WWNZ-FM, and began simulcasting WWNZ's talk format, though it would air a few separate shows. Paxson sold WWNZ-FM to Press Broadcasting, which also owned WKCF, in 1993. In May of that year, Press Broadcasting initiated the WTKS calls and the "Real Radio" format, which was talk shows during the week (including Howard Stern from May 1994 through February 2004) and alternative rock on the weekend. Real Radio was created by Sabo Media CEO Walter Sabo for Press Broadcasting. The station was sold back to Paxson in 1996 and then came under the umbrella of Clear Channel Communications (now iHeartMedia) in 1997. On June 21, 2007, Clear Channel announced the request of transfer for their entire Orlando cluster into the Aloha Station Trust upon the consummation of the impending company buyout.

WTKS held an annual "Kicks for Guns" program in association with the Orlando Police Department where citizens could exchange guns, no questions asked, for shoes. The program made international headlines when the 2007 exchange managed to net a surface-to-air rocket launcher.

WTKS-FM HD2 originally aired a simulcast of talk radio 540 WFLF, and the HD3 subchannel aired a simulcast of sports radio 740 WYGM. WTKS stopped simulcasting WYGM on the HD3 subchannel on May 6, 2012, with the WYGM simulcast moving to WJRR-HD2, resulting in the demise of "Channel X". On February 12, 2014, the WFLF simulcast moved from W283AN 104.5 to W273CA 102.5 (displacing smooth jazz), and WTKS-HD2 flipped to its current urban format as "The Beat", filling the void after long-time urban station WJHM flipped to Top 40 the previous day.

=== Previous shows ===
SBK Live originally aired from 7:00pm to 11:00pm Monday through Friday. After the show was cancelled Soul Brother Kevin moved back as a member of The Monsters in the Morning show.

The Buckethead Show with Buckethead (Jason Bailey). It originally aired from 11:00am to 3:00pm Monday through Friday. After the show was cancelled on June 26, 2013, Bailey went to CBS Radio's WZGC-FM in Atlanta to co-host The Morning Grind with Randy Cross and Kristen Ledlow.

== HD2 translator ==
| Call sign | Frequency | City of license | FID | ERP (W) | HAAT | Class | Transmitter coordinates | FCC info |
|---|---|---|---|---|---|---|---|---|
| W283AN | 104.5 FM | Altamonte Springs, Florida | 149386 | 221 | 153 m (502 ft) | D | 28°36′23″N 81°27′24.3″W | LMS |
