= WPOZ =

Christian radio station in Orlando, Florida

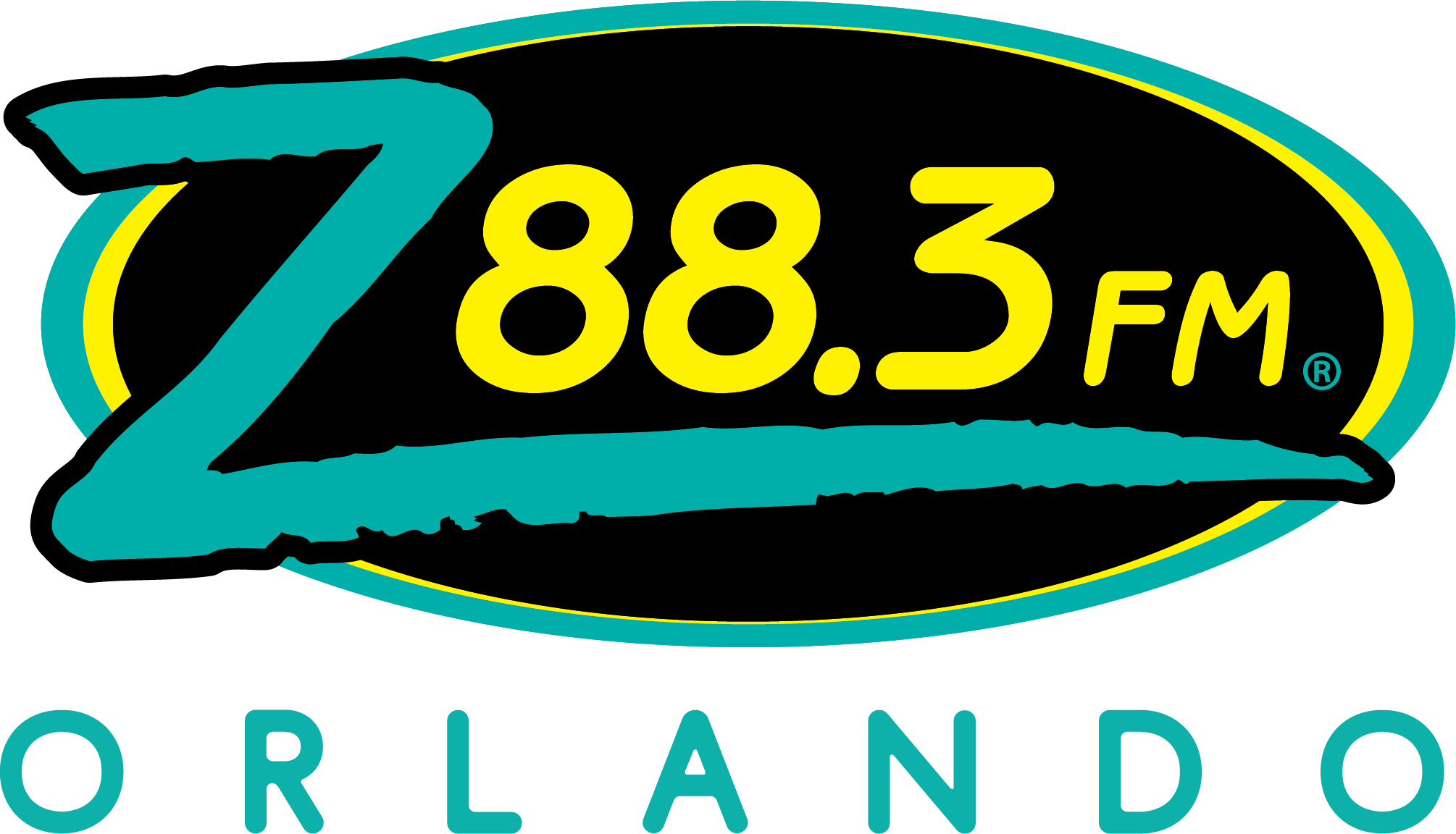

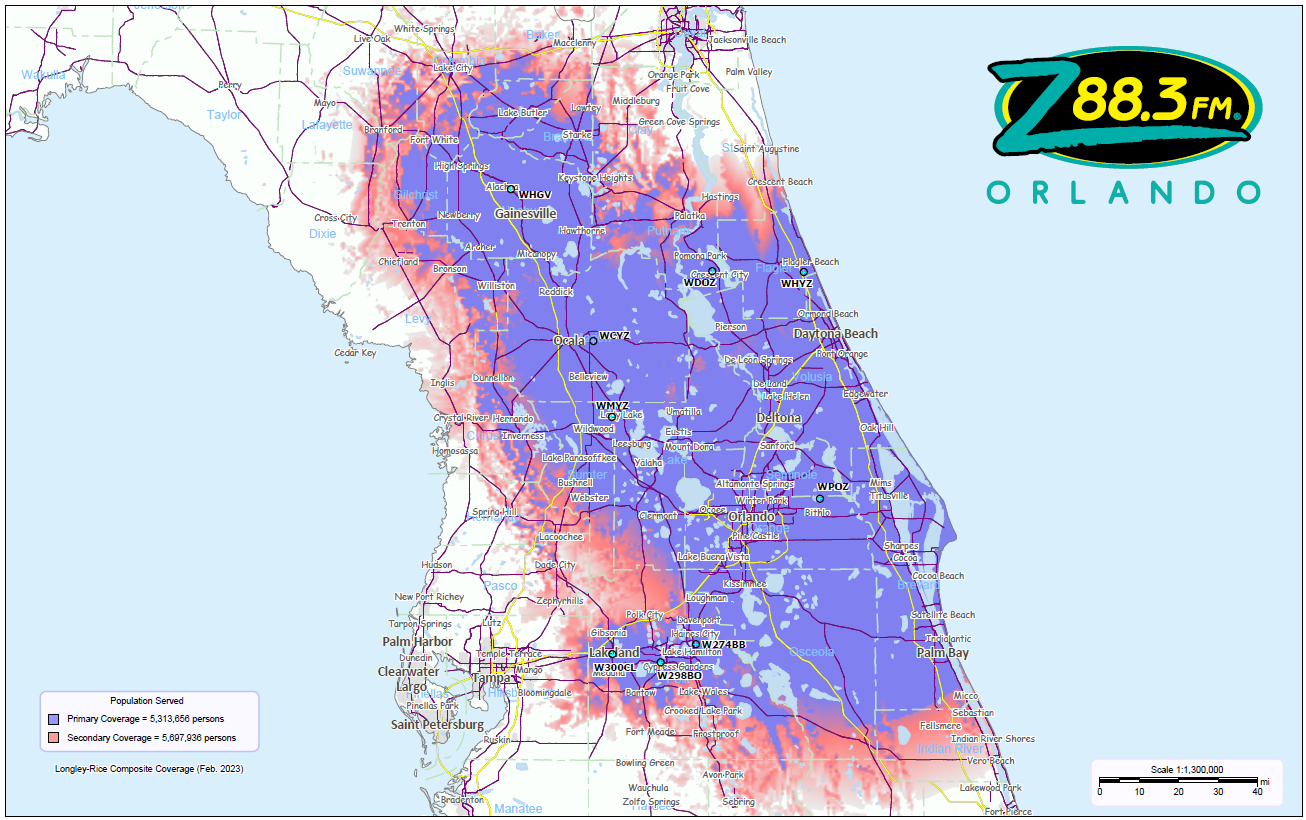
- Coverage map
- Orlando, Florida; United States
- Broadcast area: Central Florida
- Frequency: 88.3 MHz (HD Radio)
- Branding: Z88.3

Programming
- Language: English
- Format: Christian adult contemporary
- Subchannels: HD2: La Z (Spanish music); HD3: Hot 95.9 (Christian hip-hop)

Ownership
- Owner: (Central Florida Educational Foundation, Inc.)
- Operator: Z Ministries, Inc.
- Sister stations: WDOZ; WHYZ; WMYZ; WCYZ; WHGV

History
- First air date: August 14, 1995
- Former call signs: WEAZ (1995–1998)
- Call sign meaning: Positive

Technical information
- Licensing authority: FCC
- Facility ID: 9876
- Class: C
- ERP: 100,000 watts
- HAAT: 452 meters (1483 feet)
- Transmitter coordinates: 28°36′08″N 81°05′36″W
- Translator: See § Frequencies
- Repeater: See § Frequencies

Links
- Public license information: Public file; LMS
- Webcast: Listen live
- Website: zradio.com

WPOZ (88.3 FM) is a non-commercial, listener-supported radio station licensed to Orlando, and serving all of Central Florida. It is owned by Central Florida Educational Foundation, Inc., and operated by Z Ministries, inc. It broadcasts a Christian adult contemporary format. The radio studios are in Altamonte Springs.

WPOZ has an effective radiated power (ERP) of 100,000 watts. The transmitter is in east Orange County, Florida. WPOZ is simulcast on several other owned stations in Central Florida. The station broadcasts using HD Radio technology. There are other Christian music formats on WPOZ's three digital subchannels, which feed several FM translators in Orlando and other cities in Central Florida.

== History ==
On August 14, 1995, the station signed on. diplexed into then-WCPX(TV) channel 6 in Orlando (now WKMG-TV) and the power limited to 2,500 watts to eliminate viewer interference from a closely spaced FM station. The call sign at the beginning was WEAZ and the city of license was Union Park, Florida. The owner is Central Florida Educational Foundation. The studios at sign on was on Lake Brantley Road in Altamonte Springs, just north of Orlando.

In 1998, the call letters switched to WPOZ, to stand for "Positive Hits Z88.3", in contrast to the secular Top 40 charts. The city of license changed to Orlando with the increase in power to 100,000 watts.

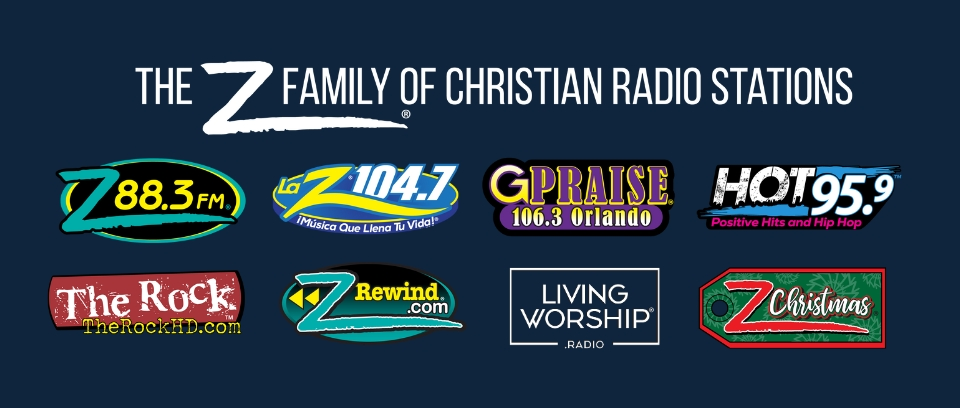

== Frequencies ==
In addition to 88.3 MHz, this station also broadcasts on other frequencies in different areas of Central Florida:

Call sign	Frequency	City of license	Facility ID	ERP W	Height m (ft)	Class	FCC info
WHYZ	91.1 FM (HD)	Palm Coast, Florida	92508	9,200	49 m (161 ft)	C3	FCC (WHYZ)
WDOZ	91.7 FM	Pierson, Florida	176311	5,000	108 m (354 ft)	C3	FCC (WDOZ)
WMYZ	88.7 FM (HD)	The Villages, Florida	27291	35,000	82 m (269 ft)	C2	FCC (WMYZ)
WCYZ	99.7 FM	Ocala, Florida	191546	2,200	168 m (551 ft)	A	FCC (WCYZ)
WHGV	99.5 (HD2)	Gainesville, Florida	76433	2,300	133 m (436 ft)	A	FCC (WHGV)

Broadcast translators for WPOZ (FM/HD1)
Call sign	Frequency	City of license	FID	ERP (W)	HAAT	Class	FCC info
W274BB	102.7 FM	Haines City, Florida	142441	38	66 m (217 ft)	D	LMS
W237FO	95.3 FM	Lakeland, Florida	142414	55	59 m (194 ft)	D	LMS
W298BO	107.5 FM	Winter Haven, Florida	142420	27	92 m (302 ft)	D	LMS

WPOZ, WMYZ, WHYZ and WHGV broadcast in HD Radio.

In late 2008, WPOZ was granted authorization by the U.S. Federal Communications Commission (FCC) to increase its signal strength to 100,000 watts; this was accomplished when WKMG-TV acquired channel 26 from Entravision Communications as part of the Digital television transition in the United States. This meant that TV channel 6 would go vacant and therefore interference was no longer possible to viewers of WKMG-TV from the present or enhanced operation of WPOZ.

Central Florida Educational Foundation acquired a station in Lecanto, Florida, WLMS, from the Roman Catholic Diocese of Saint Petersburg. As that station also broadcast on 88.3 FM, Central Florida Educational Foundation closed down WLMS, enabling WPOZ to increase its signal strength without that station interfering. After the upgrade, WPOZ's main signal would sufficiently cover areas already served by some of its translators, making them redundant. Those were moved into Orlando to rebroadcast the HD offerings.

WPOZ had a repeater in Daytona Beach, WEAZ 88.1 MHz, licensed to Holly Hill; this station was permitted in 1995 as WANX, signed on as a simulcast of WPOZ as WEAZ in 1998. The operation of WEAZ (like WLMS in Lacanto) would also interfere with the WPOZ power increase, as it operated on the first adjacent 88.1 FM channel of WPOZ. Therefore, it signed off permanently in December 2008, and its license was soon cancelled to make room for WPOZ's power increase application for 100,000 watts.

On its website, it was announced that the FCC had approved a move of WMYZ 88.7 from Clermont to The Villages, with listeners in the Clermont area redirected to the now-more-powerful 88.3 signal.

=== WPOZ HD3 & WHYZ HD2 ===
WPOZ-HD3, WHYZ-HD2, and WHGV broadcast a Christian rhythmic contemporary format as Hot 95.9; for those without HD radio receivers, it is heard on the following station and translators:

Call sign	Frequency	City of license	Facility ID	ERP W	Height m (ft)	Class	FCC info
WHGV	99.5 FM (HD)	Gainesville, Florida	76433	2,300	133 m (436 ft)	A	FCC (WHGV)

Broadcast translators for WPOZ-HD3
Call sign	Frequency	City of license	FID	ERP (W)	HAAT	Class	FCC info
W250BH	97.9 FM	Melbourne, Florida	142447	250	121 m (397 ft)	D	LMS
W240BV	95.9 FM	Orlando, Florida	157091	99	141 m (463 ft)	D	LMS

Broadcast translator for WHYZ-HD2
Call sign	Frequency	City of license	FID	ERP (W)	HAAT	Class	FCC info
W278BP	103.5 FM	Palm Coast, Florida	157073	54	65 m (213 ft)	D	LMS

=== WMYZ HD2 ===
WMYZ-HD2 broadcasts a Christian oldies format as "ZRewind.com". It is also heard on the following translator:

Broadcast translator for WMYZ-HD2
Call sign	Frequency	City of license	FID	ERP (W)	HAAT	Class	FCC info
W245AZ	96.9 FM	The Villages, Florida	142461	250	97 m (318 ft)	D	LMS

=== WJHM-HD3 ===
WJHM-HD3 broadcasts an urban gospel format as GPraise; this station also relays to the following translators:

Broadcast translators for WJHM-HD3
Call sign	Frequency	City of license	FID	ERP (W)	HAAT	Class	FCC info
W292DZ	106.3 FM	Orlando, Florida	40157	215	141 m (463 ft)	D	LMS
W249EH	99.7 FM	Daytona Beach, Florida	142468	250	84 m (276 ft)	D	LMS
W227CP	93.3 FM	Sanford, Florida	143886	250	117 m (384 ft)	D	LMS

=== WPOZ-HD2 ===
WPOZ-HD4 used to broadcast a Christian rock format as 103.7 The Rock and had a low-powered repeater in Clermont, W279CT. That facility was traded to RDA Broadcast Holdings, LLC for stations WCYZ 99.7 Ocala and WHGV 99.5 Gainesville, Florida.

W240BV, W273CA and W292DZ used to be low-powered repeaters that rebroadcast WPOZ in the Lake County area but were moved to Orlando.

Central Florida Educational Foundation resumed control of W273CA following the expiration of the lease with iHeartMedia in September 2018. It now broadcasts a Spanish Christian contemporary format, "La Z" (Pronounced "La Zeta") via WPOZ-HD2 at 102.5 FM in Orlando and 104.7 FM in Kissimmee

Broadcast translators for WPOZ-HD2
Call sign	Frequency	City of license	FID	ERP (W)	HAAT	Class	FCC info
W273CA	102.5 FM	Orlando, Florida	157099	250	141 m (463 ft)	D	LMS
W284DU	104.7 FM	Kissimmee, Florida	156212	250	123 m (404 ft)	D	LMS

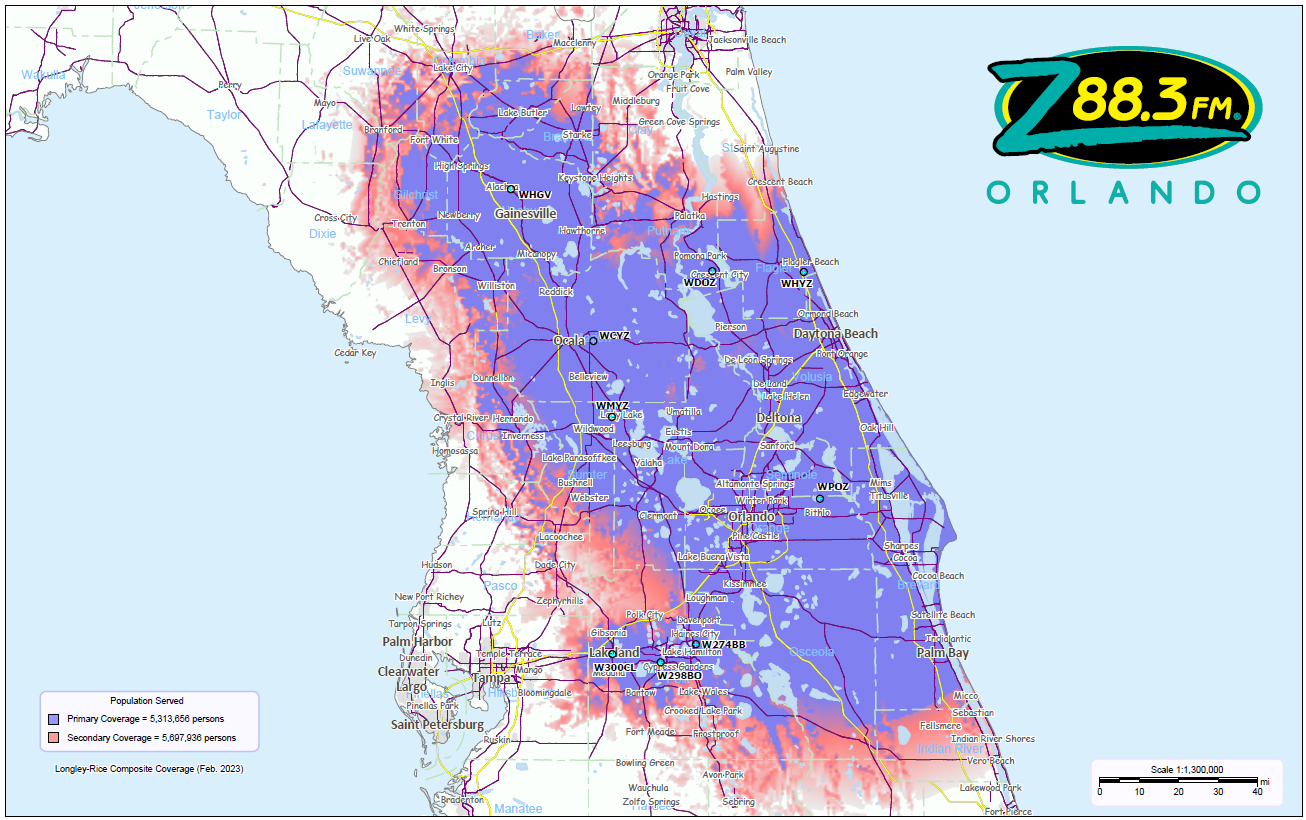
Z88.3® FM, WPOZ Coverage Map - Serving Central Florida and surrounding areas and nationwide on the ZRadio App.
