= WESH =

Television station in Daytona Beach, Florida

ATSC 3.0 station
- Daytona Beach–Orlando–Melbourne, Florida; United States
- City: Daytona Beach, Florida
- Channels: Digital: 11 (VHF); Virtual: 2
- Branding: WESH 2

Programming
- Affiliations: 2.1: NBC; for others, see § Technical information

Ownership
- Owner: Hearst Television; (Hearst Properties Inc.)
- Sister stations: WKCF

History
- First air date: June 11, 1956
- Former channel numbers: Analog: 2 (VHF, 1956–2009)
- Former affiliations: Independent (1956–1957)
- Call sign meaning: Wright Esch (original licensee for the station)

Technical information
- Licensing authority: FCC
- Facility ID: 25738
- ERP: 64.6 kW
- HAAT: 512.4 m (1,681 ft)
- Transmitter coordinates: 28°36′36″N 81°3′34″W
- Translator(s): 18 (UHF) Orange City; 19 (UHF) Ocala

Links
- Public license information: Public file; LMS
- Website: www.wesh.com

WESH (channel 2) is a television station licensed to Daytona Beach, Florida, United States, serving the Orlando area as an affiliate of NBC. It is owned by Hearst Television alongside Clermont-licensed CW affiliate WKCF (channel 18). The two stations share studios on North Wymore Road in Eatonville; (Note: Though in Eatonville, the station has a Winter Park mailing address, and media refer to the studios as being in Winter Park.) WESH's primary transmitter is located on Brown Road near Christmas, Florida, with additional transmitters in Orange City and Ocala.

WESH began broadcasting on June 11, 1956. The original permittee was W. Wright Esch, former owner of a Daytona Beach radio station. In its first year of operation, it was an independent station with a signal that mostly served the Daytona Beach area from facilities in the nearby town of Holly Hill. In 1957, the station began broadcasting at higher power from a tower near Orange City, becoming receivable in Orlando, and affiliated with NBC. After adding Orlando to its coverage area, it opened a second studio in the Orlando suburb of Winter Park. Cowles Communications acquired the station in 1965. During its ownership tenure, WESH endured a decade-long challenge to its broadcast license by a Daytona Beach–based group which protested the increasing shift of station operations to the Orlando area. The challenge became of national interest when an appeals court's verdict implied that existing licensees enjoyed less of an advantage in the renewal process. During this time, WESH typically rated second in Orlando-market news ratings.

Cowles sold WESH to H&C Communications in 1984. H&C built new studios for the station in the Daytona Beach and Orlando areas, including the present main studio in Eatonville. Pulitzer Publishing acquired WESH in 1993; news ratings declined during the first years of its ownership. Under news director Bill Bauman, the station deemphasized crime news and won national attention for doing so, but ratings success did not follow until after Pulitzer sold its broadcast stations to Hearst in 1998 and Orlando's traditional market leader, WFTV, struggled in the late 1990s and early 2000s. Hearst acquired WKCF in 2006, creating a duopoly.

== History ==
=== Early years ===
In 1952, channel 2 was allocated to Daytona Beach. The owners of two local radio stations applied for permission to use the channel. First was W. Wright Esch, through Telrad, Inc.; Esch owned WMFJ. He was shortly followed by WNDB, the radio station of the Daytona Beach Evening News and Morning Journal, which proposed a much higher-power station than Esch. The Federal Communications Commission (FCC) designated the two applications for hearing in February 1954, but before the hearing began, WNDB withdrew, leaving Telrad unopposed. On July 8, 1954, Telrad obtained the channel 2 construction permit. Telrad planned to operate channel 2 as WMFJ-TV in studios shared with the radio station in Holly Hill and stated at the time that it hoped to have the TV station in operation within a year.

In May 1955, Esch announced the sale of a majority interest in WMFJ to Harold Kaye and E. J. Arnold, with Esch intending to focus his energies on building channel 2. It was the second time Esch had agreed to sell the radio station. In late 1954, Theodore Granik and William H. Cook contracted with Esch to buy WMFJ and the channel 2 permit. After the Kaye–Arnold sale of WMFJ was announced, they sued Esch. Original plans to build a tower near Orange City were set aside for the time being, and work began on a tower at the studio facility site in Holly Hill. At Holly Hill, the tower could be no higher than 300 feet (91 m), while at Orange City it could be up to 1,000 feet (300 m).

Esch announced in February 1956 that he was seeking to sell nearly all shares in Telrad to John H. Perry, Jr., and his company, WCOA Inc. Perry owned newspapers, radio stations, and one television station: WJHP-TV in Jacksonville. The FCC initially approved the sale on April 27, at which time Perry announced plans to open WESH-TV in June and his hopes to affiliate with NBC. WESH-TV began broadcasting on June 11, 1956. Esch was the first person seen on the new station, introducing Daytona Beach to television as he had to radio 21 years prior with WMFJ. Only one of its two planned studio cameras was on site; a camera and staff from WJHP-TV were seconded to Holly Hill to aid the startup. Negotiations with NBC were still ongoing but had yet to bear fruit. Most of the station's programming was filmed, with 10 percent consisting of live programs, among them newscasts, hosted movies, and a Western-themed children's show. After WESH went on the air, Florida courts ruled in favor of WESH and against Granik and Cook.

In February 1957, WESH revealed its plan for a tower at Orange City, which received final construction approval in June. It was held up by stations in Orlando, which believed that a site near Bunnell would provide additional service to unserved viewers than Orange City, which would bring WESH's signal into the Orlando area. WESH signed an affiliation agreement with NBC in July, ending speculation on whether WESH or the new Orlando station WLOF-TV (channel 9, now WFTV) would be given the affiliation, and announced it would begin work on the Orange City tower. At the time, there was only one network-affiliated TV station in Central Florida, WDBO-TV (channel 6, later WCPX-TV and now WKMG-TV), which was a primary CBS affiliate but aired some programs from NBC and ABC. Though WLOF-TV obtained the ABC affiliation, it was not on the air yet, and WESH signed for selected ABC programs. The network affiliation and new transmitter facility went into use on November 2. At the same time, Perry reallocated employees to WESH from WJHP-TV, which shut down on October 25 as a result of its struggles as an ultra high frequency station.

By 1960, WESH had opened a second studio in Winter Park, a suburb of Orlando. Network programming was received at Winter Park and microwaved to Orange City for transmission. A 1964 profile of the station in Variety described WESH's Winter Park studios as its "main studios".

=== Cowles ownership and license challenge ===
In 1965, Cowles Communications, Inc. acquired WESH-TV from Perry Publications. In 1969, the Holly Hill studio was updated to allow the origination of local color programs from the Daytona Beach area.

Our application was occasioned by the fact that Channel 2 no longer was a Daytona Beach station ... All the guys who called the shots lived in Orlando.

— William Crotty, president, Central Florida Enterprises

A group of 24 local businessmen, mostly from Daytona Beach, named Central Florida Enterprises filed a competing application with WESH-TV's broadcast license renewal in January 1970. The group believed that a locally owned station would be more responsive to the needs of local residents than one owned by Cowles. Were it to win the license over Cowles, Central Florida Enterprises planned increased coverage of local politics and community issues, as well as an attempt to buy the existing WESH facilities. The commission accepted the application that April and designated WESH-TV's renewal and Central Florida Enterprises's application for comparative hearing in March 1971.

In the hearing designation order, two issues were specified: whether Cowles had moved the WESH-TV main studio without FCC approval and a mail fraud case involving other subsidiaries of Cowles. The mail fraud case involved five subsidiaries of Cowles that pleaded no contest to federal mail fraud charges in Iowa in early 1971, having sold magazines and books by mail order in ways that deceived consumers and disadvantaged franchisees. Hearings were held in Washington, D.C., and Daytona Beach in 1972. Central Florida Enterprises contended that Cowles had moved most WESH-TV operations to Winter Park, making it the de facto main studio and diminishing the role of the Holly Hill studio. Cross-examination turned up that Winter Park had more control rooms, staff engineers, and video tape machines. The FCC's Broadcast Bureau's recommendations reflected poorly on WESH-TV, suggesting a one-year probationary renewal instead of the then-standard three-year renewal and that Cowles needed to be monitored for FCC rule compliance. Cowles, meanwhile, suggested that Central Florida Enterprises lacked the necessary financial backing.

FCC examiner Chester F. Naumowicz rendered an initial decision in favor of renewing WESH-TV in December 1973, citing the company's "thoroughly acceptable" record of public service in contrast to the weaker credentials presented by Central Florida Enterprises. He believed this record protected the station, even though the mail fraud case had shown that the firm was "rife" with fraud. However, he denied an application by Cowles to move WESH's tower and said that the station should be required to move most operations back to Holly Hill. Central Florida Enterprises appealed the decision to the full commission, which was sharply divided and began reconsidering what had once seemed like a lock. The presence of two Black members in the Central Florida Enterprises consortium improved its standing as the FCC began to prefer minority ownership in broadcasting, while the main studio issue continued to weigh heavily on Cowles. In November 1975, Broadcasting magazine reported that FCC staff had been directed to draw up an order granting renewal of WESH-TV and another awarding the channel to Central Florida Enterprises, a practice seen by Television Digest as rare. Were the commission to have gone through with the latter, it would have been the second time that an incumbent licensee lost to a competitor in comparative hearing, the first being the 1972 Boston channel 5 case. In December, Television Digest reported that Central Florida Enterprises was "very close to wresting channel 2 from WESH-TV" as commissioners believed Naumowicz de-emphasized findings against Cowles. The commissioners voted 4–2 in favor of Cowles in December 1976. A majority of Robert E. Lee, Charlotte Reid, James H. Quello, and Abbott M. Washburn found WESH's past performance to be superior, stronger than Naumowicz's finding that it was "thoroughly acceptable". Richard E. Wiley, Glen O. Robinson, and Benjamin Hooks dissented. Wiley believed that "thoroughly acceptable" did not entitle Cowles to a renewal given that it owned multiple stations, even though he believed the license should be renewed, while Robinson believed an auction was better suited to choose from among multiple groups seeking a channel than long, expensive hearings. A 1977 clarification strengthened the finding in favor of Cowles. It was interpreted as a major win for incumbent broadcasters seeking a preference at license renewal time, because it held that merely "substantial", not only "superior", service provided protection from a license challenge like that made by Central Florida Enterprises.

The plain meaning of the court's decision in the WESH-TV case ... is that any licensee that owns other media anywhere is vulnerable to challenge by an applicant that is without other media ties and is small enough for its owners to be also the on-the-scene managers of their intended prey. The prospects of capturing the occupied facility are enhanced, according to the court's new rules, if the challenger includes blacks or other minorities in its composition.

— Editorial in Broadcasting, October 2, 1978

Central Florida Enterprises appealed the matter to the United States Court of Appeals for the District of Columbia Circuit. The court's decision in the case, rendered on October 1, 1978, overturned the 1976 decision and sent the case back to the commission. In a ruling written by Malcolm R. Wilkey, the court set the bar for renewal expectancy back at a "superior" level of service and even then said that a challenger might prevail on other comparative criteria, such as diversification of media ownership and integration of ownership and management. The decision was read as a "blockbuster" by Broadcasting, which noted that it "set off alarms in the offices of broadcast licensees from coast to coast" and that some compared it to the 1969 denial of the Boston channel 5 license. Variety's Paul Harris projected that it would spur other recent renewals to be reconsidered, among them a pending renewal of WPIX in New York, while The Hollywood Reporter called it "potentially explosive" and Ernest Holsendolph of The New York Times highlighted its especially heavy impact on firms that owned multiple stations or also had large publishing interests. The decision prompted an emergency meeting of the National Association of Broadcasters attended by representatives of 39 different station owners. The national interest in the case "startled" William Crotty, the president of Central Florida Enterprises, who noted that this was never his firm's intent.

The FCC and Cowles asked the court for a rehearing, which was denied, but the court blunted many of the national implications of its original ruling by claiming that "an incumbent with a meritorious record would possess a natural advantage" because it offered performance, not mere promises. After Cowles appealed to the Supreme Court, it announced on May 18, 1979, that it had reached a tentative settlement with Central Florida Enterprises. Under the terms, Central Florida Enterprises would withdraw in exchange for a monetary settlement, the naming of its shareholders to a program advisory board, and a promise not to move its main studio from Daytona Beach without FCC approval. Two months later, the appeals court—to the surprise of all parties—rejected the settlement and sent the case back to the FCC. In June 1981, after telegraphing its decision months prior, the FCC ruled again in favor of renewing WESH-TV's license. Central Florida Enterprises vowed to appeal, but the Court of Appeals unanimously upheld the new FCC finding on the grounds that it was more comprehensive, and the Supreme Court denied the final appeal in 1983. By then, Central Florida Enterprises had already disbanded.

Cowles Communications—which ceased producing the magazine Look in 1971 and traded its other print holdings (including Family Circle magazine) and WREC-TV in Memphis, Tennessee, for shares in The New York Times Company that same year—moved its corporate headquarters to Daytona Beach in 1976. (Note: Cowles Communications was one of three separate companies owned by the Cowles family with media interests. The others were Cowles Media Company and the Des Moines Register and Tribune Company.) The November 1978 court decision helped prolong the existence of Cowles Broadcasting. That January, the company had announced plans to dissolve itself and transfer WESH and KCCI in Des Moines, Iowa, to a new company, but after the WESH ruling and a lack of ruling by the Internal Revenue Service over a tax matter, Cowles remained in business. Amid the hearing battle, in July 1980, the Orange City tower was replaced with a new, 1,740-foot (530 m) mast at the same site, increasing WESH's potential audience by 30 percent. The more northerly location of its tower impaired reception in southern Brevard County, where in 1980 WESH announced plans to build a translator. It operated on channel 56 from 1983 to 1986; a new station, WAYK, began using channel 56, forcing the WESH translator to channel 16. (Note: In 2002, translator service was affected by the sign-on of WPBF-DT in West Palm Beach, also on channel 16.)

=== H&C ownership ===
In 1983, Cowles Communications liquidated itself to shareholders, giving them cash, shares in The New York Times Company, and shares in a new firm, Cowles Broadcasting Inc. The next year, it engaged Goldman Sachs to find a buyer for its Cowles Broadcasting stations. WESH and KCCI were sold to H&C Communications of Houston in June 1984 for $182.5 million, most of the purchase price representing the value of WESH. H&C had obtained a cash infusion the year prior when it sold the Houston Post. It was attracted to the Orlando market by rising station valuations, including the $125 million sale of WFTV in 1983.

H&C continued efforts started under Cowles to build a new headquarters for WESH-TV. In 1983, Cowles proposed building a studio along Interstate 4 at the DeBary/Deltona interchange, between Orlando and Daytona Beach, reducing redundant facilities and personnel in Holly Hill and Winter Park and replacing a lengthy set of microwave circuits necessary to transmit programming between the studios and the tower. Apprehensive neighbors, fearing impacts on television reception, spurred the Volusia County Council to deny a necessary zoning change. By mid-1984, the station was proposing to build nearby in Cassadaga. In 1986, WESH agreed to build facilities in Daytona Beach proper, receiving approval for a site near Daytona Beach Regional Airport. Two years later, the station instead acquired and renovated an office building at 211 N. Ridgewood Avenue, where a 180-foot (55 m) concrete tower for transmission back to Orange City was erected, topped with a lit "2".

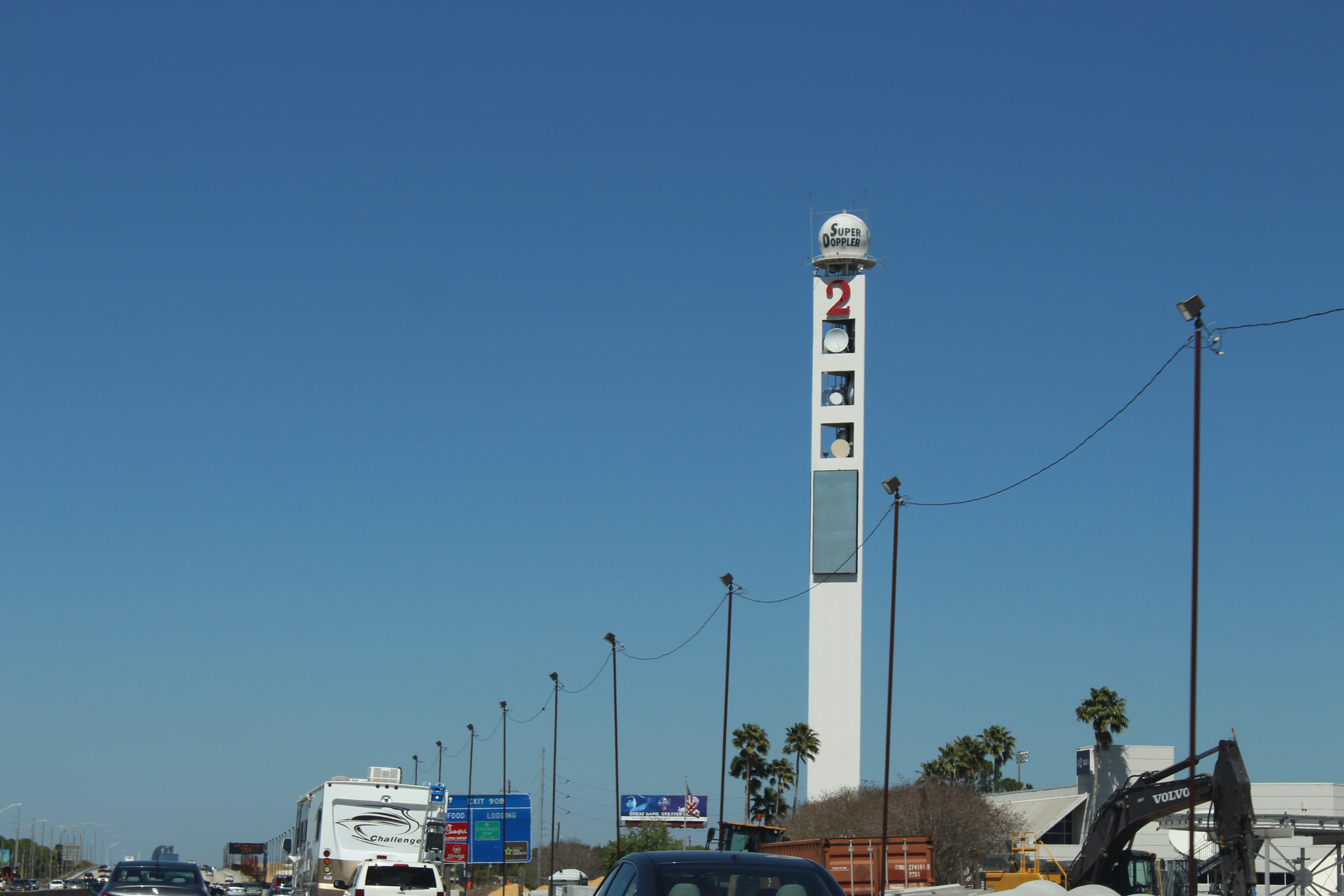
The WESH studio-transmitter link tower, topped by a weather radar, at the Eatonville (Winter Park) studio

As the Daytona Beach facility was renovated, WESH received approval from Eatonville, near Winter Park, to build a new facility with its own concrete tower, rising 225 feet (69 m). The 58,000-square-foot (5,400 m^{2}) building, located off Wymore Road alongside Interstate 4, opened in January 1991; it featured two studios, including a news studio that opened to the newsroom.

=== Pulitzer ownership ===
H&C agreed in May 1992 to sell its five TV stations to Young Broadcasting as the result of a quiet deal among its shareholders to exit the business. WESH and KPRC-TV in Houston accounted for three-fourths of H&C's revenue. Within weeks, Young's capacity to buy the H&C stations was called into question. On June 11, a petition was filed by two life insurance companies to force Young Broadcasting into involuntary bankruptcy. H&C president Jim Crowther told the Houston Post, "[W]e are not going to enter into an agreement with somebody who is even temporarily in a bankruptcy court." Sale talks were put on hold while Young tried to resolve the bankruptcy case. As the insurers moved to withdraw the bankruptcy petition, Young was unable to arrange financing, and the deal fell apart. By late August, four new buyers were reported to be in discussions with H&C.

On February 18, 1993, H&C announced the sale of WESH and KCCI in Des Moines to Pulitzer Publishing Company for $165 million. Orlando became the largest market in which Pulitzer operated, and as before, WESH was the more valuable of the two stations. When it took over on July 1, 1993, WESH's general manager was elevated to president of Pulitzer Broadcasting. Newscast and other production at the Daytona Beach studio stopped in 1997, and 14 employees responsible for producing WESH's morning newscast were transferred to Winter Park. At the time, the anchors for the newscast had to drive between Daytona Beach and Winter Park, where the noon newscast originated. WESH later sold the building to the Daytona Beach Housing Authority in 2004, retaining ground-floor space and the outside tower for its own use.

Pulitzer sold its broadcasting operation to Hearst-Argyle Television in 1998. Hearst-Argyle (Note: In 2009, the Hearst Corporation acquired Argyle's stake in the venture, took it private, and renamed it Hearst Television.) created a duopoly by buying Orlando's affiliate of The WB, WKCF (channel 18), for $217.5 million in 2006. WKCF operations relocated to WESH's studios, which were renovated to add space for 40 staff associated with channel 18.

WESH was historically the NBC affiliate viewed on cable in Gainesville, Florida, even though its broadcast signal there was marginal. At the start of 2009, WNBW-DT (channel 9) debuted as an in-market NBC affiliate. In June, WNBW invoked network non-duplication, forcing Cox Communications to black out all of WESH's NBC programming to protect the new in-market affiliate.

== Local programming ==
=== News operation ===
WESH had local newscasts from its first day on air. Historically, it had the market's second-rated television newscasts, with WDBO-TV in first place and WFTV in third place. In June 1973, the tower used to broadcast channels 6 and 9, located in Bithlo, collapsed. The result was a reshuffling of Orlando TV news ratings. WESH, the only station unaffected, benefited with across-the-board increases for its news viewership as WDBO fell to a close second. Though WDBO edged ahead of WESH in 1976 after the replacement of the tower, WFTV surged into first place in the late 1970s, though WESH still had a higher viewership share in the full area of dominant influence, which included outlying counties that the other stations did not reach as efficiently, but this began to drop in the early 1980s. From February 1980 to 1981, the audience share for WESH's 6 p.m. newscast decreased by seven percentage points, sending it to third. While WESH had a stronger-than-average performance in the Daytona Beach area, its perception as a Daytona Beach station caused viewership to be lower in areas in and near Orlando such as Orange and Seminole counties. In the mid-1980s, WESH continued to split second place in the evening news ratings with WCPX. However, as NBC's prime-time ratings rose in the mid- to late 1980s, channel 2 invested in promotion and its news staff and challenged WFTV for the lead at 11 p.m. As WCPX struggled with internal issues in the late 1980s and early 1990s, WESH became the primary second-place news station in the market, ahead of WCPX but unable to unseat WFTV.

Handcuffs, yellow tape and body bags are turning off viewers. I'd like to appeal to people who are not watching local news by doing news that is more relevant.

— Bill Bauman, general manager, WESH-TV, in 1997

In 1997, Bill Bauman—who had worked at WESH as news director in the mid-1980s and had previously worked at channels 6 and 9—arrived from KCRA-TV in Sacramento, California, to serve as general manager. Bauman faced a station whose ratings were declining as a relaunched WCPX was making inroads; WESH's 5 p.m. newscast had slipped to third, and fewer people were watching the station at 6 and 11 p.m. The move coincided with the addition by Pulitzer of five new reporting positions and a change in management at the company that led to increased engagement in improving news at the company's stations. Bauman implemented substantial changes in news format, deemphasizing crime stories and introducing a new series of reports on hard-news issues including transportation, education, and growth. The newsroom was reorganized with a beat reporting model. A late afternoon features program, Discover Orlando, was introduced along with an additional newscast at 4:30 (later 4) p.m.; it was renamed Closer Look before being canceled after two years.

Bauman's approach earned the station national attention, including a feature in The New York Times Magazine, but ratings initially fell, which Bauman attributed to stiff competition in the 4 p.m. timeslot. At the end of the decade, WFTV experienced sharp declines in the ratings for its newscasts, and WESH surged to first at 11 p.m. and a close second at 6 p.m. Even though WFTV later regained first place, all three stations were within three percentage points of the audience. By 2001, WESH was back in first for its late newscast as NBC's prime-time lineup outrated ABC. For the first time in years, a slumping WFTV opened the door for a three-station race in Orlando TV news, but it held on to a large lead in the early evening ratings. In 2002, WFTV rehired two-time former news director Bob Jordan to turn that station around; a strong prime time performance by CBS lifted WKMG to first place. By 2005, WESH was narrowly in third at 11 p.m. and a distant second at 6. In 2003, WESH won a Alfred I. duPont–Columbia University Award for its coverage of the Space Shuttle Columbia disaster, and the next year it won a Peabody Award for an investigation into the quality of newly built homes, conducted with the Orlando Sentinel.

Amid declining ratings, WESH introduced a new 4 p.m. news hour in 2006. By 2009, WESH was back in second in all news time slots, a position it retained in 2012 while also leading in viewers at 4. The station continued to be competitive with WFTV in late news, with both stations being able to claim leadership depending on how viewership was measured, and was second in early news. A 7 p.m. newscast debuted in 2023, bringing the station's total news output to 65 1/2 hours a week.

WESH also produces newscasts for WKCF. Prior to the stations being co-owned, WESH produced a 10 p.m. newscast for WKCF between January 2001 and September 2002, replacing WKMG, with existing anchor Bud Hedinger. WESH restored a news presence on WKCF in January 2007, when it debuted a two-hour morning news extension at 7 a.m. On August 31, 2009, WKCF resumed a nightly 10 p.m. newscast. The program, initially a half-hour, expanded to a full hour in 2016.

=== Sports programming ===
Beginning in 2025, WESH split rights with WKCF to a package of over-the-air telecasts, simulcast from FanDuel Sports Network, of the Orlando Magic basketball team, with WESH airing four games and WKCF airing six.

== Notable former on-air staff ==
- Marc Middleton – sports anchor, 1988–2001; news anchor, 2001–2006
- Byron Pitts – reporter, 1986–1988
- Stuart Scott – sportscaster, 1990–1993

== Technical information ==
WESH's primary transmitter is located near Christmas, Florida, and broadcasts in the ATSC 3.0 (NextGen TV) format. The station's ATSC 1.0 channels are carried on the multiplexed signal of sister station WKCF:

Subchannels provided by WESH on the WKCF multiplex
Subchannel	Res.	Short name	Programming	ATSC 1.0 host
2.1	1080i	WESH	NBC	WKCF
2.2	480i	MeTV	MeTV	WKCF
2.3	480i	STORY	Story Television	WKCF

The Christmas tower was jointly built by WESH and WKMG for digital broadcasting. WESH began broadcasting in digital on VHF channel 11 on May 1, 2001. It ceased broadcasting in analog on the digital transition date of June 12, 2009, and continued to use channel 11 for digital broadcasting.

WESH is one of the host stations in Orlando's ATSC 3.0 deployment, which rolled out on July 1, 2021.

Subchannels of WESH (ATSC 3.0)
Subchannel	Res.	Short name	Programming
2.1	1080p	WESH	NBC
18.1	1080p	WKCF	The CW (WKCF)
24.1	720p	WUCF	PBS (WUCF-TV)

Subchannel broadcast with digital rights management

=== Translators ===
Digital replacement translators on the WESH license operate in Orange City (channel 18) and Ocala (channel 19). The Orange City transmitter operates in ATSC 1.0 format and only carries subchannels of WESH:

Subchannels of WESH from the Orange City transmitter
Subchannel	Res.	Short name	Programming
2.4	1080i	WESH-DT	NBC
2.5	480i	MeTV	MeTV
2.6	480i	STORY	Story Television
