= WTGL =

Television station in Leesburg, Florida

- Leesburg–Orlando, Florida; United States
- City: Leesburg, Florida
- Channels: Digital: 34 (UHF), shared with WUCF-TV; Virtual: 45
- Branding: Good Life 45

Programming
- Affiliations: 45.1: Religious independent

Ownership
- Owner: Good Life Broadcasting, Inc.

History
- First air date: December 12, 2000
- Former call signs: WLCB-TV (2000–2007)
- Former channel numbers: Analog: 45 (UHF, 2000–2009); Digital: 46 (UHF, until 2018), 23 (UHF, 2018–2020)
- Call sign meaning: The Good Life

Technical information
- Licensing authority: FCC
- Facility ID: 9881
- ERP: 1,000 kW
- HAAT: 379.6 m (1,245 ft)
- Transmitter coordinates: 28°36′8″N 81°5′36″W

Links
- Public license information: Public file; LMS
- Website: www.tv45.org

WTGL (channel 45) is a religious independent television station licensed to Leesburg, Florida, United States, serving the Orlando area. The station is locally owned by Good Life Broadcasting, and maintains studios on Skyline Drive in Lake Mary, Florida. Through a channel sharing agreement with PBS member station WUCF-TV (channel 24), the two stations transmit using WUCF-TV's spectrum from an antenna near Bithlo.

WTGL airs programming from Total Living Network, World Harvest Television and The Worship Network. Prior to mid-2010, it was affiliated with Faith TV until that network became My Family TV. That network has since moved to low-power station WSCF-LD (channel 31).

== History ==
The original construction permit for Channel 45 was granted to Central Florida Educational Television, Inc. (a now-defunct subsidiary of the Central Florida Educational Foundation, owner of FM radio station WPOZ) in 1987. It was assigned the call letters WLCB-TV, which stood for "Leesburg Community Broadcasting", after the station's city of license. However, CFET was never able to get the station on the air, so it sold the construction permit and partially completed transmitting facility to Good Life Broadcasting (then owner of then-WTGL-TV, channel 52) in May 2000, after the FCC began to permit duopolies. Once Good Life secured the permit, it completed the construction of its transmitting facility, and the station signed on for the first time on December 12, 2000. WLCB took a mix of general entertainment and religious programming. The station ran a mix of westerns, old sitcoms, public domain movies, some lifestyle shows, and initially cartoons, which by 2003 were gone. Their original station, then called WTGL, continued on with an all Christian/religious format.

Good Life owned and operated both its original station and WLCB until September 2006, when the original WTGL was sold to TBN and its call sign was subsequently changed to WHLV-TV. Good Life continues to host WHLV's master control operations to the present day even though WHLV has since moved to its own studio facility. The two stations shared a studio on the corner of I-4 and Michigan Avenue in Orlando until June 2007, when Channel 45 and the master controls for Channel 52 were moved to the former studios of WKCF in Lake Mary.

With the WTGL callsign made available since the original WTGL became WHLV-TV, WLCB officially changed its call sign to WTGL (without the "-TV" suffix) on September 12, 2007. Even though the "-TV" suffix is missing from Channel 45's legal call sign, the station continues to use the "-TV" suffix on-air and on its website.

== Technical information ==
=== Subchannels ===
WUCF-TV and WTGL transmit using WUCF-TV's spectrum from an antenna near Bithlo. The stations' signals are multiplexed:

Subchannels of WUCF-TV and WTGL
| License | Subchannel | Res. | Short name | Programming |
|---|---|---|---|---|
| WUCF-TV | 24.1 | 1080i | WUCF-HD | PBS |
| WUCF-TV | 24.2 | 480i | Create | Create |
| WUCF-TV | 24.3 | 480i | Kids | PBS Kids |
| WUCF-TV | 24.4 | 480i | NHK | NHK World-Japan |
| WUCF-TV | 24.5 | 480i | FL CH | The Florida Channel |
| WTGL | 45.1 | 720p | WTGL-DT | Main WTGL programming |

=== Analog-to-digital conversion ===
WTGL shut down its analog signal, over UHF channel 45, on February 17, 2009, the original target date on which full-power television stations in the United States were to transition from analog to digital broadcasts under federal mandate (which was later pushed back to June 12, 2009). The station's digital signal continued to broadcasts on its pre-transition UHF channel 46, using virtual channel 45. On March 9, 2018, WTGL began sharing spectrum with WUCF-TV; the station ceased broadcasting on RF channel 46 on March 28, 2018.
