= WKCF =

Television station in Clermont, Florida

- Clermont–Orlando, Florida; United States
- City: Clermont, Florida
- Channels: Digital: 23 (UHF); Virtual: 18
- Branding: CW18

Programming
- Affiliations: 18.1: The CW; for others, see § Subchannels

Ownership
- Owner: Hearst Television; (Hearst Properties Inc.)
- Sister stations: WESH

History
- First air date: December 8, 1988
- Former channel numbers: Analog: 68 (UHF, 1988–1991), 18 (UHF, 1991–2009); Digital: 17 (UHF, 2002–2020)
- Former affiliations: Independent (1988–1995); The WB (1995–2006)

Technical information
- Licensing authority: FCC
- Facility ID: 53465
- ERP: 1,000 kW
- HAAT: 510.8 m (1,676 ft)
- Transmitter coordinates: 28°35′12.6″N 81°4′57.5″W

Links
- Public license information: Public file; LMS
- Website: www.wesh.com/cw18

WKCF (channel 18) is a television station licensed to Clermont, Florida, United States, serving the Orlando area as an affiliate of The CW. It is owned by Hearst Television alongside Daytona Beach–licensed NBC affiliate WESH (channel 2). The two stations share studios on North Wymore Road in Eatonville; WKCF's transmitter is located in Bithlo, Florida.

WKCF began broadcasting on channel 68 on December 8, 1988. It was an independent station owned by New Jersey–based Press Broadcasting, which had previously owned WMOD in Melbourne and struggled with an inadequate signal; the company saw WKCF as a transmitter upgrade for WMOD. Before channel 68 was even on the air, Press Broadcasting had reached a deal with Brevard Community College to exchange channel 68 for channel 18, which had been a non-commercial allotment as WRES. After opposition from competing broadcasters, the swap was approved and took effect in October 1991, with WKCF moving to channel 18. Programming highlights of WKCF's first years on air included Orlando Magic road games, a kids' club known as the Buckaroo Club, and a 10 p.m. newscast produced by Orlando CBS affiliate WCPX-TV.

In 1995, WKCF became Orlando's affiliate of The WB. It was among the network's strongest affiliates throughout its tenure. Press Broadcasting moved the station to new studios in Lake Mary in 1998 and sold it the next year to Emmis Communications. Ratings continued to rise, but the newscast was scrapped because its viewers were older than those of The WB. During this time, Emmis acquired a 50-percent stake in the syndicated national morning show The Daily Buzz and moved production of the program from Dayton, Ohio, to the WKCF studios.

In 2006, WKCF was sold as part of Emmis's exit from television to Hearst-Argyle Television, and the station joined The CW upon the merger of The WB and UPN. WKCF's operation was integrated into that of WESH, including the introduction of morning and 10 p.m. newscasts.

== History ==
=== Early years on channel 68 ===
The Federal Communications Commission (FCC) assigned channel 68 to Clermont in Lake County in September 1984. By May 1985, the FCC had eight applications on file for the channel, which the commission awarded to Channel 68 Inc. in October 1986. This group was a 13-investor consortium presided by Clermont councilman Nestor Cole and with Norris Woolfork—publisher of The Orlando Times, the city's Black newspaper—as a partner. The group was reported by its own spokesman to be unsure whether it wanted its station to be oriented toward the Tampa or Orlando markets; it would operate as a Spanish-language station in Tampa or a general-entertainment independent station in Orlando.

In November 1987, Press Broadcasting—a division of the Asbury Park Press newspaper in New Jersey—announced it would purchase the channel 68 construction permit, then bearing the call sign WCLU, from Channel 68 Inc. For Press, acquiring the channel 68 permit was the first step in rectifying the problems it had experienced competing in the Central Florida television market. Press owned WMOD (channel 43) in Melbourne, which it intended to be the second major independent station for Central Florida. In spite of a $7 million outlay on programming, it ran into considerable difficulty because WMOD's transmitter site could not provide adequate full-market coverage; in part, this was because of aviation-related height limitations on its tower. This prompted Press Broadcasting to lease 18 hours a day of airtime to the Home Shopping Network, which also received an option to buy the station in 1988. Robert McAllan, the vice president of broadcasting for Press Broadcasting, declared that the channel 68 permit purchase "culminate[d] a two-year search for improved transmission facilities" for WMOD.

The permit acquisition did not represent the entirety of Press's planned upgrade. Two months before acquiring the permit for WCLU, Press announced the acquisition and donation of a non-commercial educational station in Cocoa, WRES (channel 18). This church-owned station was donated to Brevard Community College as part of an agreement that gave the college financial incentives to participate in a channel swap with Press. The deal foresaw that WMOD's channel 43 might not be the one with which WRES switched; with the WCLU acquisition, it became clear that the swap would be between channels 18 and 68. To acquire channel 68, Press sold WMOD to HSN.

After several delays due to weather, channel 68 debuted as WKCF on December 8, 1988. It broadcast from a transmitter in Orange City. The programming lineup included many of the shows that were in WMOD's inventory—a total of $14 million in movies and syndicated shows—as well as a key sports attraction: 25 road games of the new Orlando Magic basketball team for five years beginning in 1989.

=== Move to channel 18 ===
Press Broadcasting and Brevard Community College then approached the FCC with the proposal to swap WKCF to channel 18 and WRES to channel 68. Two Orlando stations vehemently opposed the switch: WMFE-TV (channel 24), Orlando's public television station, and WOFL (channel 35), the market's established independent outlet. Both feared that the upgrades planned to channels 18 and 68 in the swap would create issues for them. WMFE feared that an upgraded WRES could become a competing public TV station, vying for viewers and donors with channel 24. WOFL believed Press Broadcasting had illegally controlled the channel 18 permit and that the two facilities did not serve the same area. Also objecting was a low-power TV station on channel 19 in Orlando, fearing displacement from the proposed WKCF facility in the Orlando-market tower farm at Bithlo. The FCC approved the proposal in December 1989, affirming the decision in October 1990 after further appeals from WOFL. This allowed Press to pay for WRES to relocate to a new tower site.

On October 7, 1991, the swap took place. WKCF moved to channel 18. WRES changed to channel 68 and simultaneously adopted the call sign WBCC. For WKCF, the switch to channel 18 improved its signal coverage in Brevard County. Prior to the swap, WKCF had relocated its offices from a facility on Adanson Street to one on Courtland Street, near Interstate 4.

WKCF started producing a kids' club program called The Buckaroo Club, hosted by Tim Kincaid as "Ranger Bob", in April 1992. Kincaid had created the character in 1980 at WUHF in Rochester, New York; WKCF's promotion manager had previously worked at WUHF and lured Kincaid to Orlando. By August, WKCF had 30,000 Central Florida children in its kids' club, more than double its previous size. Kincaid also created a late-night monster movie series called Friday Night with the GraveMaster, which aired for several months in 1992. Buckaroo Club never attracted high ratings, and after several time changes, it was canceled in 1994.

Press Broadcasting expanded its Orlando-market communications interests in 1993 with the acquisition of WWNZ-FM 104.1. The company was never able to expand to a second radio station and sold the station, then known as WTKS-FM, to Paxson Communications Corporation in 1996.

During the early 1990s, WKCF and Press Broadcasting emerged as the primary opposition to the construction of a new independent station in Orlando, WRBW (channel 65), which began airing in June 1994. The much-delayed outlet had received a construction permit in 1990, but delays and objections by Press had kept the station off the air. Previously, Rainbow had lobbied against the channel swap. When WRBW's antenna was installed on the same tower as WKCF, channel 18 refused to leave the air to protect workers on the mast from electromagnetic radiation, and the owner of the tower had to intercede and shut power to the WKCF transmitter. In 1994, WKCF extended its deal with the Orlando Magic for another 5 years, now covering 30 road games a season.

=== WB affiliation ===
On January 11, 1995, WKCF became Orlando's affiliate of a new television network, The WB. Over the course of the early and mid-1990s, WKCF became an increasing factor in the Orlando television market. The 1991 channel swap gave the station a more favorable number, and management negotiated lower channel positions on local cable systems. This dovetailed with an improved syndicated programming inventory and improved on-court performance for the Orlando Magic; even though it was still being beaten by WOFL in the ratings, WKCF was profitable for most of its history to 1996. The station also improved its kids lineup and emphasized comedy reruns under programming and promotions director Chris Wolf, who had previously worked at WOFL.

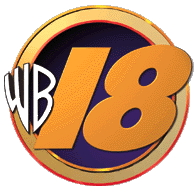
WKCF logo in the 1990s

The station's early years as a WB affiliate brought changes in ownership structure as well as a studio relocation. The parent of Press Broadcasting, New Jersey Press, transferred its media properties into a new firm, Press Communications, in June 1997—two months before selling off the Asbury Park Press to Gannett. The next year, WKCF relocated to the Orlando suburb of Lake Mary, building a 17,000-square-foot (1,600 m^{2}) office and studio complex on a property that backed up to Interstate 4 and was adjacent to WOFL, its primary competitor. Only a line of pine trees separated the two stations.

In 1999, WKCF was sold to Emmis Communications for $191.5 million; Emmis noted its interest in WKCF as one of the top affiliates of The WB in a rapidly growing market, while Press cited a desire to focus on radio. Orlando instantly became the largest market in which Emmis owned television stations. Emmis paid The WB for a 10-year renewal of its affiliation, the third station group to make such a reverse compensation payment to the network. That fall, the Magic moved their games from WKCF to WRBW.

The Lake Mary studios became a key piece of two Emmis strategies. In 2002, Lake Mary became the home of a consolidated master control facility for WKCF and three other Emmis stations: WVUE in New Orleans; WALA-TV in Mobile, Alabama; and WFTX-TV in Fort Myers, Florida. The next year, it acquired a 50-percent stake in the national morning show The Daily Buzz, becoming an equal partner with ACME Communications. Emmis began airing Buzz on WKCF and WBPG in Mobile in December 2003. As part of the venture, The Daily Buzz shifted production from WBDT in Dayton, Ohio, to WKCF's studios in mid-2004. Moving The Daily Buzz to Lake Mary gave it access to more production capabilities and made it easier to attract quality guests for the program.

=== Duopoly with WESH and CW affiliation ===
Emmis secured The CW affiliation for WKCF in March 2006, shortly after the announcement that The WB and UPN would merge for the fall television season. The announcement had been expected; WRBW was by then owned by Fox Television Stations, whose UPN affiliates had all been bypassed by the merged network and which instead started a competitor, MyNetworkTV. By that time, WKCF was on the market; Emmis began exiting television in 2005 and selling its stations.

In May 2006, Emmis announced the sale of WKCF to Hearst-Argyle Television, (Note: In 2009, the Hearst Corporation acquired Argyle's stake in the venture, took it private, and renamed it Hearst Television.) owner of local NBC affiliate WESH (channel 2), for $217.5 million. Emmis retained the Lake Mary facility and half-ownership of The Daily Buzz in the sale, and WKCF relocated to WESH's studios in Eatonville, which were renovated to add space for 40 staff associated with channel 18. By 2008, WKCF was the highest-rated CW affiliate in the United States.

Beginning in 2025, WKCF split rights with WESH to a package of over-the-air telecasts, simulcast from FanDuel Sports Network, of the Orlando Magic, with WESH airing four games and WKCF airing six.

== Newscasts ==
In 1991, WKCF began carrying a 10 p.m. newscast produced by WCPX (channel 6). The WCPX newscast had been started the year before for air on local cable systems. Over time, the program evolved; in response to confusion from viewers, the WKCF newscast was given a separate look and feel, down to separate identifying microphone flags. By 1997, the arrangement saw WKCF sell six of the 11 advertising minutes and pay the news anchors, while WCPX sold the remainder and handled production.

WKCF's newscast went from the only local 10 p.m. news program in the market to one of three in the span of a year. In March 1997, WFTV debuted a 10 p.m. newscast for WRBW, and in March 1998, WOFL debuted its own 10 p.m. news offering. The WKCF newscast began to promote itself as "The Original 10 O'Clock News".

WESH took over news production for WKCF on January 1, 2001, a change made in hopes of using the higher-rated WESH news department as a platform to boost ratings. Bud Hedinger continued to anchor, with WESH news presenters joining him. WKCF retained all of the advertising time in the new arrangement. The newscast lasted less than two years before being canceled in September 2002. Wayne Spracklin, WKCF's general manager, explained to Mediaweek that it had become too costly, was losing ratings ground to WOFL, and was mismatched with the younger viewers tuning in for WB prime time programming.

WESH restored a news presence on WKCF in January 2007, when it debuted a two-hour morning news extension at 7 a.m. On August 31, 2009, WKCF resumed a nightly 10 p.m. newscast. The program, initially a half-hour, expanded to a full hour in 2016.

During the George Zimmerman trial in 2013, WKCF's second subchannel was used to carry WESH's normal daytime lineup so WESH could air trial coverage.

== Technical information ==
=== Subchannels ===
WKCF's transmitter is located in Bithlo, Florida. The station's signal is multiplexed:

Subchannels of WKCF
Subchannel	Res.	Short name	Programming
18.1	1080i	WKCF	The CW
18.2	480i	TCrime	True Crime Network
18.3	480i	ESPN8	ESPN8 The Ocho
2.1	1080i	WESH	NBC (WESH)
2.2	480i	MeTV	MeTV (WESH)
2.3	480i	STORY	Story Television (WESH)

Broadcast on behalf of another station

WKCF is a participant in Orlando's ATSC 3.0 (NextGen TV) deployment, which rolled out on July 1, 2021.

=== Analog-to-digital conversion ===
WKCF began airing a digital signal on June 1, 2002. It ended regular programming on its analog signal, on UHF channel 18, on June 12, 2009, as part of the federally mandated transition from analog to digital television. it continued to broadcast in digital on UHF channel 17, using virtual channel 18.

WKCF was one of three stations in the Orlando area (along with WKMG-TV and WOFL) to participate in the "Analog Nightlight" program, which lasted until WKCF's analog transmitter was shut down permanently on July 12, 2009.

WKCF was repacked to channel 23 on January 16, 2020, as a result of the 2016 United States wireless spectrum auction.
