= WKMG-TV =

Television station in Orlando, Florida

- Orlando, Florida; United States
- Channels: Digital: 26 (UHF); Virtual: 6
- Branding: News 6

Programming
- Affiliations: 6.1: CBS; for others, see § Technical information and subchannels

Ownership
- Owner: Graham Media Group; (Graham Media Group, Orlando, Inc.)

History
- First air date: July 1, 1954
- Former call signs: WDBO-TV (1954–1982); WCPX-TV (1982–1998)
- Former channel numbers: Analog: 6 (VHF, 1954–2009); Digital: 58 (UHF, 1999–2009)
- Former affiliations: All secondary: NBC (1954–1957); ABC (1954–1958); DuMont (1954–1955)
- Call sign meaning: Tribute to Katharine Meyer Graham, former publisher of The Washington Post

Technical information
- Licensing authority: FCC
- Facility ID: 71293
- ERP: 1,000 kW
- HAAT: 515.4 m (1,691 ft)
- Transmitter coordinates: 28°36′36.0″N 81°3′34.0″W
- Translator(s): W21DX-D (UHF) Ocala

Links
- Public license information: Public file; LMS
- Website: www.clickorlando.com

WKMG-TV (channel 6) is a television station in Orlando, Florida, United States, affiliated with CBS and owned by Graham Media Group. The station's studios are located on John Young Parkway (SR 423) in Orlando, and its transmitter is located on Brown Road near Christmas, Florida.

Channel 6 is the oldest TV station in Central Florida, signing on as WDBO-TV in July 1954. It was built and owned by the Orlando Broadcasting Company alongside Orlando radio station WDBO (580 AM). WDBO-TV aired local programming as well as shows from all major networks of the era; it became a sole CBS affiliate in 1958, by which time the market had three commercial stations. It was owned by Rhode Island interests, first the Cherry Broadcasting Company and later The Outlet Company, from 1957 to 1986; late in the latter's ownership, it changed its call sign to WCPX-TV, an artifact of an attempted merger with Columbia Pictures that ultimately never transpired, and moved to its present studio facilities.

Channel 6 led local news ratings until its tower in Bithlo collapsed during construction work in June 1973, killing two workers. The station was not at full-power until the mast was replaced more than two years later; its ratings fell, and in the late 1970s WFTV moved from worst to a dominant first. The slide was aggravated after Outlet sold WCPX-TV to First Media for $200 million, a then-record price for an Orlando TV station, at a peak of broadcast station valuations. For most of its ownership, First Media shied away from making major investments, in part crimped by the high purchase price. The newscasts struggled and went through multiple changes in format, anchors, and presentation; meanwhile, First Media used WCPX-TV as a springboard to produce programming for national syndication.

First Media put its television stations on the market in 1996. They were purchased by the Meredith Corporation, which traded WCPX-TV to Post-Newsweek Stations. WCPX-TV became WKMG-TV in January 1998 in honor of Katharine Meyer Graham, the longtime publisher of The Washington Post. High turnover continued in the news department, but the station on the whole became more competitive, particularly in late news ratings, against WFTV and WESH.

== WDBO-TV: Construction and early years ==
After the Federal Communications Commission (FCC) ended its multi-year freeze on new TV station assignments in April 1952, it allocated two very high frequency (VHF) channels to Orlando, channel 6 and 9. Orlando radio station WDBO (580 AM) applied for channel 6 and remained unopposed until Central Florida Enterprises, a group of local businessman, filed a competing application in September. The competing bids for channels 6 and 9 made a comparative hearing necessary and delayed the arrival of television in Orlando, as the commission continued to work on awarding stations in larger, higher-priority cities.

Central Florida Enterprises withdrew its application for channel 6 on October 13, 1953, unblocking the channel for WDBO. Their decision won formal praise from the Orlando city council for accelerating the arrival of television to the area. The next day, the FCC awarded WDBO's parent company, the Orlando Broadcasting Company, a construction permit for channel 6. Management predicted they would be on the air by late April 1954. WDBO-TV secured primary affiliation with CBS as well as supplemental agreements to air the programs of the ABC, DuMont, and NBC networks. A tower on Texas Avenue, west of US 441, was constructed in the spring of 1954 as part of a TV Center, containing new transmitter facilities for WDBO radio and television as well as television studios. Technical issues postponed the start of broadcasting several times. Mark Barker, the station's first production manager, recalled that the noisy metal roofing in the studio was a major issue, and insulation lowered the ceiling height.

WDBO-TV signed on the air on July 1, 1954, as the first television station in Central Florida. It remained the only Orlando-area station until November 1957, when WESH (channel 2) in Daytona Beach moved its antenna and began covering the full market as an NBC affiliate. In February 1958, WLOF-TV (now WFTV) began on channel 9 as Orlando's ABC affiliate.

In addition to network programming, WDBO-TV featured a variety of local programs. William D. "Don" McAllister came over from WDBO radio and hosted Hunting and Fishing with Don, which aired on the station from its 1954 launch until 1972. Walter Sickles, channel 6's first program director, hosted the children's show Adventures with Uncle Walt; it aired until February 27, 1967, when the host was abruptly fired moments before airtime. For three years, the station had a weekly program of organ music. A freelance photographer sold still images of accidents and news events for the station's newscasts.

In 1957, Orlando Broadcasting Company sold the WDBO stations for $3 million (equivalent to $25.5 million in 2025) to the Cherry Broadcasting Company of Providence, Rhode Island. It was owned by William S. Cherry, president of WPRO radio and television in that city, and by two of their senior executives. Cherry died in 1961; his wife, Mollie, took over the management of the WDBO stations and a co-owned Orlando hotel.

== Outlet Company ownership ==
In January 1963, Cherry Broadcasting Company announced it was negotiating to sell the WDBO stations to The Outlet Company, a Providence-based department store company and owner of WJAR radio and television there. After receiving FCC approval, the transaction was completed effective August 1. In 1966, Outlet completed a 4,400-square-foot (410 m^{2}) addition to the 10,000-square-foot (930 m^{2}) original studio, which featured an enlarged newsroom as well as a fallout shelter.

WDBO-TV and WFTV in 1966 proposed constructing, on a joint basis, a new TV tower near Bithlo. Channel 6 was the first to switch to the new tower, relocating in June 1969. It was the tallest structure in Florida at 1,484 feet (452 m). The new tower was eagerly awaited in Brevard County, where reception of the Orlando and Daytona Beach stations had historically been poor. After a year's delay because of manufacturing issues at General Electric, it was activated in 1970.

The tower collapsed on June 8, 1973, while workers were installing an antenna for public station WMFE-TV; two people died. WFTV was taken out of service, while channel 6 was able to quickly revert to its previous facility. The collapse impacted ratings for the three local stations: an unaffected WESH took the lead in news, while leader WDBO sank to second and WFTV remained in third. WFTV was the first of the three television stations affected to transmit from the replacement tower on the site, switching in October 1975; WDBO-TV soon followed.

WDBO briefly moved back into the lead in early evening news ratings after the new tower went into place, though its 11 p.m. news lagged WESH. That year, after hiring Frank Magid and Associates as a consultant, the station demoted longtime anchor Ben Aycrigg from the late newscast in an evident push that favored younger talent. By 1978, bolstered by an ascendant ABC and changes to its newscasts, a rejuvenated WFTV was the number-one station in Central Florida, consigning WDBO-TV to second or third place. The easing out of Aycrigg, who was considered the Orlando equivalent of Walter Cronkite, coincided with this decline; Aycrigg continued to preside over the noon news, which was channel 6's best-performing newscast, until 1996.

=== Call sign change to WCPX and studio relocation ===
Outlet agreed to merge with Columbia Pictures, then a subsidiary of The Coca-Cola Company, in 1982. The deal fell through, but Outlet agreed to sell the WDBO radio stations, which would have required FCC approval. That sale went ahead; WDBO radio, which had existed since 1924, kept that call sign, and channel 6 had to change. The call sign WCPX-TV—for "Colpix", the abbreviation of Columbia Pictures—had already been chosen for the TV station as part of the abandoned merger plans. In spite of Columbia not buying Outlet, station management opted to keep the new designation, which took effect on June 6, 1982. In what was the second-largest group station deal for its time, in 1983, Outlet was purchased by the Rockefeller Group.

As early as 1979, Outlet began pursuing the construction of new studios for WDBO-TV. After a two-year search, it sold its land parcel on Texas Avenue in 1981 to a Massachusetts developer. Outlet lost a court battle in its attempt to use tax-free bonds to build the studio facility. The new facility, known as Broadcast House, opened on March 5, 1984.

== First Media ownership ==
Outlet pared down its holdings in 1986, selling off three of its television stations to finance the $625 million (equivalent to $1.51 billion in 2025) buyout of the group by its management from the Rockefeller Group. At that point, WCPX was sold to First Media Corporation, a private company controlled by the Marriott family separately from the Marriott Corporation, for $200 million (equivalent to $484 million in 2025)—at that time, the highest price paid for an Orlando television station. It was the first television station to be acquired by First Media, which at the time owned 11 radio stations. The radio group was sold the following year to a partnership controlled by Cook Inlet Region, Inc., but WCPX-TV remained with First Media.

First Media's ownership of WCPX-TV did not get off to a good start. The company bought WCPX-TV for a record price at the peak of broadcast station valuations in the 1980s. Between May 1986 and February 1989, the station slipped from second in total-day ratings to third, matching the position of its evening newscasts. The company shunned outside promotion and showed an unwillingness to make needed investments to keep pace. In the latter front, the high purchase price paid by First Media diminished the company's ability to spend on capital expenses. Popular personalities such as Carole Nelson and Mike Burger were fired or resigned. Glenn T. Potter, who served as company president for WCPX-TV's first five years under First Media while also being general manager, lacked prior experience in running TV stations and was attributed with many unpopular and unwise decisions; he was demoted in 1991 to head up a radio division that owned no stations. In 1990, the station began producing a 10 p.m. newscast for air on a public-access channel of the local CableVision of Central Florida system; the next year, it moved to WKCF (channel 68, then channel 18), where channel 6 continued to produce it through the end of 2000.

Under Mike Schweitzer, the station changed in February 1992 to a more aggressive format with anchors walking around the news set. David Wittman was hired from Boston to anchor the news, replacing eight-year WCPX veteran Glenn Rinker. The new format did not show much promise; ratings remained in third or, in one instance, fractionally ahead of WESH for second. In October 1993, veteran anchor Bud Hedinger, who had worked at WFTV in the 1980s, was added to the anchor team; ratings increased, and the station expanded by adding a weeknight newscast at 5:30 p.m. and weekend morning news, as well as acquiring new equipment.

First Media used Orlando and WCPX-TV as a springboard into the national syndicated programming market. Over the course of the 1980s, the station increased its production staff and aired a series of music specials. In 1990, First Media set up a program production unit, First Media Entertainment, producing pilots of syndicated shows under contract; two years later, it and Genesis Entertainment syndicated a special on the Academy Awards to stations nationwide as well as Emergency Call, showing paramedics on duty.

Brooke Spectorsky became WCPX-TV's general manager in October 1994. His arrival coincided with a change in philosophy at First Media, which acquired two other TV stations (WHNS in Asheville, North Carolina, and KPDX in Portland, Oregon) and showed a much-increased willingness to invest in the station. Under Spectorsky, the station reduced its preemptions of CBS network programs—most notably Picket Fences, which it aired in late night hours—by nearly two-thirds. First Media purchased two microwave newsgathering trucks and a satellite truck. Ten positions were added to the news department. In June 1995, the station's newscasts were completely relaunched with a more traditional format, featuring a new female anchor—Grace Rabold—as well as a new news set and graphics. The $5 million (equivalent to $9.2 million in 2025) overhaul did not lead to any increases in ratings until November 1996, when the station posted its best news viewership in years.

== Graham ownership ==
In October 1996, First Media put all three of its stations up for sale. WCPX-TV received heavy interest from a variety of buyers including Gannett; the Meredith Corporation, owner of Orlando Fox affiliate WOFL; Post-Newsweek Stations; and Sunbeam Television. On January 24, 1997, Meredith announced its acquisition of all three First Media Television stations for $435 million (equivalent to $787 million in 2025). At the time, duopolies were not allowed; Meredith had to select a station to keep. Employees at both stations suggested that WOFL would be chosen for sale, but Meredith decided to keep WOFL. In June 1997, Meredith swapped WCPX to Post-Newsweek Stations in exchange for WFSB in Hartford, Connecticut, and $60 million (equivalent to $109 million in 2025). The $275 million (equivalent to $498 million in 2025) transaction set the new single-station sales price record for an Orlando TV station. While Post-Newsweek traded up to a stronger growth market, Meredith acquired WFSB, the leading TV station in Connecticut with a cash flow 40 percent higher.

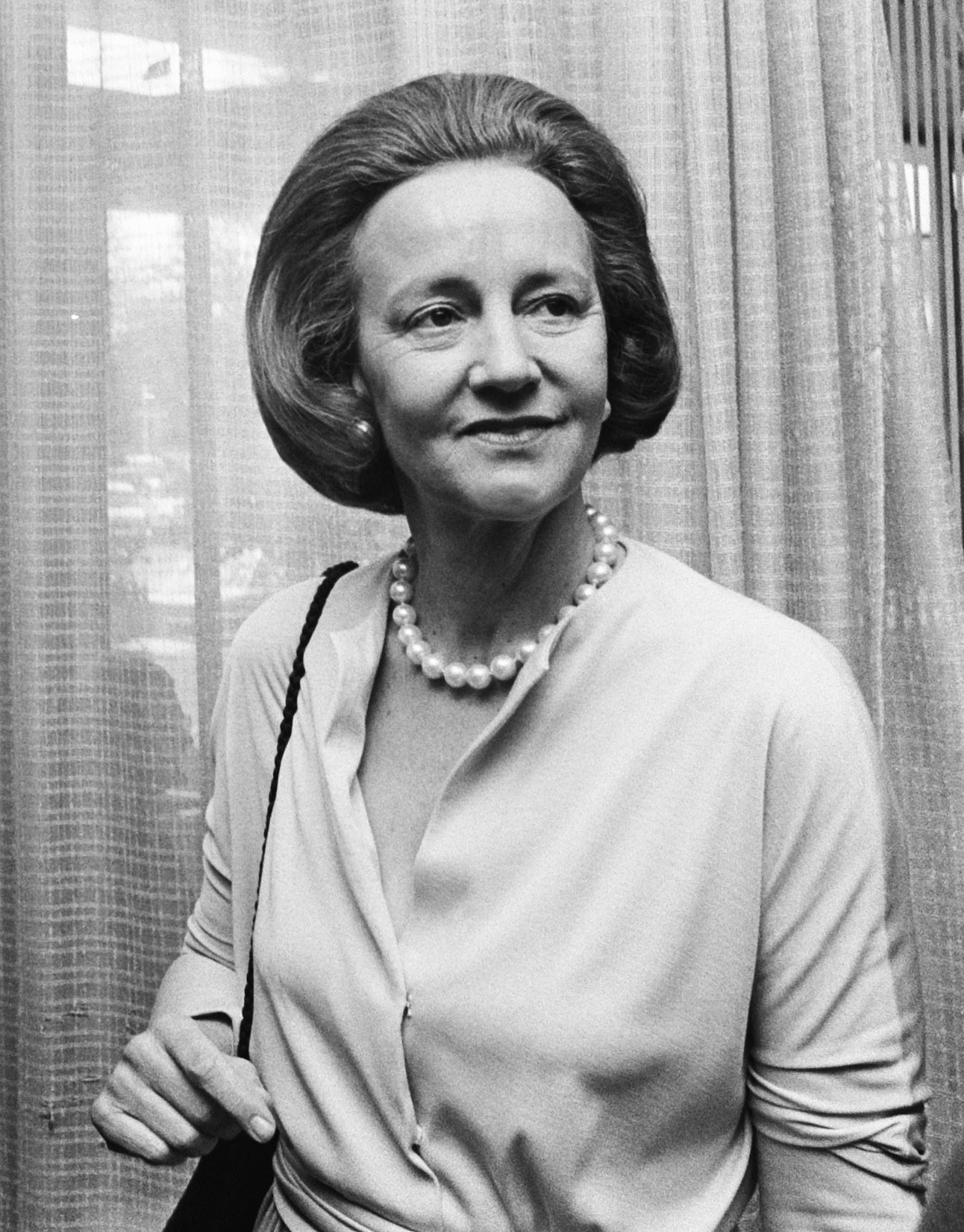
Katharine Meyer Graham, WKMG-TV's namesake

On January 30, 1998, the station changed its call sign to WKMG-TV in honor of Katharine Meyer Graham, the longtime publisher of The Washington Post, which at the time was co-owned with the Post-Newsweek group. Coinciding with the new call sign, the station debuted another top-to-bottom overhaul of its newscasts, including a new female anchor—Leslye Gale—as well as a new logo and set. The call sign change came at the same time that Paxson Communications Corporation was adopting new call signs containing "PX" for its stations nationwide; later that year, the WCPX call sign was adopted by Paxson's new station in Chicago.

In spite of turnover in news personalities and senior management, WKMG's newscasts slowly became competitive in some time periods, notably 11 p.m., by 2001. That year saw several other changes at WKMG-TV, which began broadcasting a digital signal on channel 26 on April 1, 2001; it originated from a new purpose-built tower, shared with WESH, near Christmas. The station rebranded as Local 6 that September as part of broader changes instituted by Henry Maldonado, a Post-Newsweek Stations corporate official who split his time between company headquarters in Detroit and Orlando.

On May 1, 2009, the station's 4, 5 and 5:30 p.m. newscasts were dropped, with the 5–6 p.m. news block replaced by Dr. Phil, and a new hour-long newscast at 6 p.m. debuted, moving CBS Evening News to 7 p.m. The changes were accompanied by a reduction of 15 to 20 employees. The station showed ratings strength in late news, while the syndicated talk show proved an underperforming lead-in to the 6 p.m. news. In January 2011, the hour-long 6 p.m. news was dropped, split into 6 and 7 p.m. newscasts around the CBS Evening News. That September 2011, the station relaunched a half-hour newscast at 5.

Post-Newsweek Stations became Graham Media Group on July 28, 2014. WKMG dropped the "Local 6" branding, which had been used since 2001, and adopted the name News 6. The change coincided with another round of new management. While WFTV has remained strong overall, ratings have increased for WKMG in the late 2010s and early 2020s, and late newscasts have benefited from a strong lead-in of CBS prime time programs. As of December 2023, the station produces 44 1/2 hours a week of news programming for broadcast and streaming.

== Notable former on-air staff ==
- Lisa Colagrossi – anchor (1995–2001)
- Troy Dungan
- Trace Gallagher – reporter (1993–1996)
- Jerry Hodak
- Mark McEwen – morning news anchor (2004–2005)
- Shepard Smith – reporter (1991–1993)
- Tom Terry – meteorologist

== Technical information and subchannels ==
WKMG-TV is broadcast from a tower on Brown Road near Christmas, Florida. Its signal is multiplexed:

Subchannels of WKMG-TV
Subchannel	Res.	Short name	Programming
6.1	1080i	WKMG-DT	CBS
6.2	480i	TruCrmz	NBC True CRMZ
6.3	480i	Cozi	Cozi TV
6.4	480i	Start	Start TV
6.5	480i	Catchy	Catchy Comedy
6.6	480i	DABL	Dabl
65.3	480i	H and I	Heroes & Icons (WRBW)

Broadcast on behalf of another station

After beginning digital broadcasting in 2001, WKMG-TV ended regular programming on its analog signal, over VHF channel 6, on June 12, 2009. The station's digital signal remained on its pre-transition UHF channel 26, using virtual channel 6. As part of the SAFER Act, WKMG-TV kept its analog signal on the air until July 12 to inform viewers of the digital television transition through a loop of public service announcements from the National Association of Broadcasters.

During the trials of Casey Anthony in 2011 and George Zimmerman in 2013, regular daytime programs were moved to the 6.2 subchannel to allow for wall-to-wall trial coverage.

WKMG-TV is a participant in Orlando's ATSC 3.0 (NextGen TV) deployment, which rolled out on July 1, 2021.

=== Translator ===
WKMG-TV operates a translator station, W21DX-D (WKMG-LD until 2026), in Ocala. The facility was built in 1982 as a translator for WTOG in St. Petersburg and was acquired by First Media in 1995 to improve reception. Ocala was far enough from Orlando that co-channel reception of WCTV from the Tallahassee area and high-power local radio stations interfered with proper reception of the then-WCPX.
