= WUCF =

WUCF may refer to either of two Orlando, Florida, public broadcasting stations administered by the University of Central Florida:

- WUCF-TV, a PBS member television station
- WUCF-FM, an NPR member radio station broadcasting on FM 89.9 MHz
