= WEFS =

Television station in Cocoa, Florida

Currently dark
- Cocoa–Orlando, Florida; United States
- City: Cocoa, Florida
- Channels: Digital: 30 (UHF); Virtual: 68
- Branding: WEFS-TV

Programming
- Affiliations: 68.1: Educational Ind.; for others, see § Subchannels

Ownership
- Owner: Eastern Florida State College

History
- First air date: June 18, 1987
- Former call signs: WRES (1987–1991); WBCC (1991–2013)
- Former channel numbers: Analog: 18 (UHF, 1987–1991), 68 (UHF, 1991–2008); Virtual: 30 (2003–2005)
- Former affiliations: PBS (2002–2012)
- Call sign meaning: Eastern Florida State College

Technical information
- Licensing authority: FCC
- Facility ID: 6744
- ERP: 300 kW
- HAAT: 491 m (1,611 ft)
- Transmitter coordinates: 28°36′35″N 81°3′35″W

Links
- Public license information: Public file; LMS
- Website: www.easternflorida.edu/wefs-tv/

WEFS (channel 68) is a television station in Cocoa, Florida, United States, serving the Orlando area. The station is owned by Eastern Florida State College (EFSC) and maintains studios on the EFSC campus on Clearlake Road in Cocoa; its transmitter is located on Brown Road near Christmas, Florida. The station, founded in 1987, suspended broadcasting on July 30, 2026.

The station's history begins with the activation of Cocoa's non-commercial educational channel 18 as WRES, a church-owned, family-oriented television station that began limited telecasting in June 1987. Three months later, Press Broadcasting acquired WRES and immediately agreed to donate it to Cocoa-based Brevard Community College. While the station switched to offering primarily instructional television programming including telecourses, Press set in motion a series of channel improvements. It had owned WMOD in Melbourne but found that its signal hindered it from competing in Orlando. The donation of the channel 18 license was contingent on permitting a swap with another station. That station, WKCF, began broadcasting on channel 68 in 1988. After objections from several Orlando TV stations, WKCF moved to channel 18 in October 1991; simultaneously, WRES switched to channel 68 and changed its call sign to WBCC. The move permitted both stations to upgrade their signals.

At the start of 2002, WBCC became a secondary PBS station. With the arrival of digital television, it began providing subchannels with content from the University of Central Florida (UCF) and Brevard Public Schools. The presence of WBCC and WDSC-TV in the market eroded viewer support for Orlando's primary PBS station, WMFE-TV, and contributed to financial exigencies there. In 2011, that station ceased airing PBS programming while a sale was pending. Brevard Community College partnered with UCF to launch "WUCF TV", the new primary PBS station for Central Florida, as WBCC's main channel on July 1, 2011. This partnership was unwound the next year when UCF purchased the WMFE-TV license and transmitter facility, making WUCF-TV a station in its own right. WBCC programming had continued on a subchannel throughout the run of "WUCF TV" on channel 68, minus PBS shows, and returned to the main channel as PBS programming moved to channel 24. The station changed its call sign in 2013 as part of the renaming of Brevard Community College as Eastern Florida State College. Its local programming included EFSC athletic and official events and public affairs shows for Brevard County and the Space Coast.

== History ==
=== Early years on channel 18 and swap to channel 68 ===
WRES made a quiet debut on channel 18 on June 18, 1987. The original owner was the Glorious Church of God in Christ, a Tampa-based church whose pastor had been known for promoting vegetable ice cream. The station broadcast with a low effective radiated power—1,000 watts—from a facility that had belonged to cable company Florida CableVision. Its initial broadcast schedule ran for just three hours a day, six days a week, consisting of family-oriented secular programming.

Shortly after launching, WRES was sold to Press Broadcasting. Press, a division of the Asbury Park Press newspaper in New Jersey, then turned around and donated WRES to Brevard Community College (BCC). The deal was part of a plan by Press that foresaw the move of WRES to another channel number so that a commercial station could use channel 18. In the deal, BCC received the TV station facility, $1 million in operating funds, and another $240,000 to forge partnerships with the University of Central Florida (UCF), the Florida Institute of Technology, and public schools. Press owned WMOD (channel 43) in Melbourne, which it intended to be the second major independent station for Central Florida. In spite of a $7 million outlay on programming, it ran into considerable difficulty because WMOD's transmitter site could not provide adequate full-market coverage. The deal called for a swap, but not necessarily with WMOD; Press Broadcasting hinted at further announcements on the matter. Meanwhile, Brevard Community College had been providing educational programming on cable systems since May 1986, featuring a mix of pre-produced telecourses and college-produced programming.

Two months later, in November 1987, Press acquired the construction permit for channel 68 at Clermont, which became the other half of the proposed swap arrangement. Robert McAllan, the vice president of broadcasting for Press Broadcasting, declared that the channel 68 permit purchase "culminate[d] a two-year search for improved transmission facilities" for WMOD. By August 1988, WRES was back on the air with a full schedule of educational programming: this included telecourses and instructional series as well as programs such as UCF Views the News and Florida's Backyard. By 1990, the station offered 17 courses for BCC credit taken by some 500 students. Meanwhile, Press put WKCF on the air—on channel 68—in December 1988.

Press Broadcasting and Brevard Community College then approached the FCC with the proposal to swap WKCF to channel 18 and WRES to channel 68. Two Orlando stations vehemently opposed the switch: WMFE-TV (channel 24), Orlando's public television station, and WOFL (channel 35), the market's established independent outlet. Both feared that the upgrades planned to channels 18 and 68 in the swap would create issues for them. WMFE feared that an upgraded WRES could become a competing public TV station, vying for viewers and donors with channel 24. WOFL believed Press Broadcasting had illegally controlled the channel 18 permit and that the two facilities did not serve the same area. Also objecting was a low-power TV station on channel 19 in Orlando, fearing displacement from the proposed WKCF facility in the Orlando-market tower farm at Bithlo. The FCC approved the proposal in December 1989, affirming the decision in October 1990 after further appeals from WOFL. This allowed Press to pay for WRES to relocate to a new tower site in the Deseret Ranch development.

On October 7, 1991, the swap took place. WKCF moved to channel 18. WRES changed to channel 68 and simultaneously adopted the call sign WBCC. That same year, WBCC qualified for funding from the Corporation for Public Broadcasting, making it eligible for state and federal support. Over the course of the 1990s, the station's audience and student count increased. In 1995, Time Warner Cable in Orlando added channel 68 to its lineup. By 1997, Brevard Community College had 4,000 students in 91 courses offered over television and online.

On January 1, 2002, the station became a secondary PBS member station, showing some limited programming from the network. By that April, renovations began to accommodate WBCC-DT channel 30, which took to the air on November 4, 2003. WBCC offered several digital subchannels shortly after launching. The University of Central Florida entered into a memorandum to use one of WBCC's subchannels in March 2004; in September, BPS-TV launched with programming from Brevard Public Schools, which was produced and transmitted by WBCC.

WBCC shut down its analog signal, over UHF channel 68, on February 17, 2009, the original target date on which full-power television stations in the United States were to transition from analog to digital broadcasts under federal mandate. The station's digital signal remained on its pre-transition UHF channel 30, having used virtual channel 68 since 2005.

=== "WUCF TV": Central Florida's primary public TV station ===
Prior to July 2011, WMFE-TV had been the flagship PBS station for central Florida. In fall 2010, WMFE's owner, Community Communications, announced that it had been forced to furlough several employees due to financial difficulties. Fundraising for WMFE radio was strong, but donations faltered for WMFE's television service. On April 1, 2011, WMFE announced that it would sell channel 24 and leave PBS due to these financial difficulties and "critical uncertainties in federal and state funding". One cause of WMFE's financial difficulties was the "triple overlap" of WMFE-TV, WBCC-TV, and WDSC-TV (channel 15) in Daytona Beach. The latter two were secondary stations that paid less to PBS and only aired a selection of the network's programming.

When news spread of the sale, a campaign was undertaken by local residents and students at UCF to try to keep an active PBS station in the Orlando market. On May 26, 2011, the UCF Board of Trustees approved a partnership with BCC to create "WUCF TV", the new primary PBS station for Central Florida. The new station would lease WBCC's primary digital channel and operate from WBCC's facilities. However, WBCC would retain its license and call letters. On June 2, PBS approved the creation of "WUCF TV" and announced that it would become Central Florida's primary PBS channel. The station served as the Orlando market's only PBS station, as WDSC-TV in Daytona Beach left PBS on July 1, concurrent with WMFE's departure from PBS and the launch of "WUCF TV". WBCC's existing programming and UCF TV continued as subchannels.

=== Resuming independence ===
On June 21, 2012, Community Communications announced that it would sell all of WMFE-TV's assets, except the studio facilities, to the University of Central Florida. With the acquisition of the WMFE-TV license, BCC and UCF announced that the operating agreement for channel 68 would be unwound once PBS programming returned to channel 24. This took place on November 15, 2012, at which time WBCC ended its PBS membership and once again became an educational independent station, with its programming returning to the main subchannel.

On July 1, 2013, Brevard Community College changed its name to Eastern Florida State College in conjunction with the offering of new four-year degrees. As part of the name change, WBCC changed its call sign to WEFS.

WEFS suspended broadcasting effective July 30, 2026. In a message posted to the station's website, Eastern Florida State College noted the closure came "following the loss of critical funding sources". In fiscal year 2024, the station received $370,400 from the Florida Department of Education and $523,000 from the Corporation for Public Broadcasting.

== Local programming ==
WEFS produced and aired broadcasts related to Eastern Florida State College, including athletics events and college commencement. Through a partnership with the Florida Today newspaper in Cocoa, established in 2009, WEFS offered Brevard County–targeted public affairs programming.

== Subchannels ==
WEFS broadcast from a transmitter on Brown Road near Christmas, Florida. The station's signal was multiplexed:

Subchannels of WEFS
Subchannel	Res.	Short name	Programming
68.1	1080i	WEFS-HD	Main WEFS programming
68.2	480i	WEFS-CL	Classic Arts Showcase
68.3	480i	WEFS-NS	First Nations Experience
68.4	480i	WEFS-FL	The Florida Channel
