= Seminole Government Television =

Seminole Government Television (SGTV)
Sanford, Florida
- Channels: Digital: Bright House channel 199 AT&T U-verse channel 99

Programming
- Affiliations: The Florida Channel; NASA TV; Pentagon Channel

Ownership
- Owner: Seminole County, Florida

Links
- Website: SGTV

Seminole Government Television, or SGTV, is the Government-access television (GATV) and Educational-access television cable television channel in Seminole County, Florida.

SGTV can be viewed on Bright House Networks, cable Channel 498 in Seminole County, and on AT&T U-Verse 24 hours a day, 7 days a week. SGTV is available streaming on the Seminole County web site and the County's Mobile Web site for tablets and smart phones. In addition, select SGTV original programs can be viewed ON DEMAND from your home computer. (In the City of Oviedo, the channel is pre-empted on Monday from 5:30 PM through 7:55 AM the following morning and Tuesday though Sunday from 4:30 to 6:30 PM and 1:00 through 7:55 AM for OVTV, Oviedo's government access service).

SGTV offers coverage of local government meetings, and other educational, historical, cultural, and community programming of local and regional interest.

SGTV was previously on analog cable channel 9 until January 19, 2007, as part of Bright House's plan to move Public, educational, and government access (PEG) cable TV channels from analog to digital.
