= WFTV =

Television station in Orlando, Florida

- Orlando, Florida; United States
- Channels: Digital: 35 (UHF); Virtual: 9
- Branding: WFTV Channel 9; Channel 9 Eyewitness News

Programming
- Affiliations: 9.1: ABC; for others, see § Subchannels

Ownership
- Owner: Cox Media Group; (WFTV, LLC)
- Sister stations: WRDQ

History
- First air date: February 1, 1958
- Former call signs: WLOF-TV (1958–1963)
- Former channel numbers: Analog: 9 (VHF, 1958–2009); Digital: 39 (UHF, 2001–2020)
- Call sign meaning: "Wonderful Florida Television"

Technical information
- Licensing authority: FCC
- Facility ID: 72076
- ERP: 1,000 kW
- HAAT: 489 m (1,604 ft)
- Transmitter coordinates: 28°34′8.2″N 81°3′15.6″W
- Translator(s): 19 (UHF) Deltona

Links
- Public license information: Public file; LMS
- Website: www.wftv.com

WFTV (channel 9) is a television station in Orlando, Florida, United States, affiliated with ABC. It is owned by Cox Media Group alongside WRDQ (channel 27), an independent station. The two stations share studios on East South Street (SR 15) in downtown Orlando; WFTV's primary transmitter is located near Bithlo, Florida.

Channel 9 began broadcasting as WLOF-TV on February 1, 1958, after a four-year application process; it brought full three-network broadcasting to Central Florida. The call sign changed to WFTV in 1963. It was originally granted to the Mid-Florida Television Corporation, owned by the Brechner family and other investors. However, the same year the station went on the air, it was discovered as part of investigations into corruption at the Federal Communications Commission (FCC) that an Orlando attorney had made unethical ex parte contact on behalf of Mid-Florida to FCC commissioner Richard A. Mack. The resulting investigation triggered more than two decades of proceedings that swung between the FCC, a federal court of appeals, and the Supreme Court. A wide range of issues came under discussion, including what Mid-Florida knew about the ex parte contact; what preference should be given to minority ownership of broadcast stations; and the character of a lawyer who was partially paralyzed in a murder-suicide and indicted on gambling charges in the same week.

Under a court order, Mid-Florida ceded operational control of WFTV in 1969 to Channel Nine of Orlando, Inc., a consortium of the five companies vying for the full-time broadcast license. After enduring a fatal collapse of its tower in 1973 and returning to full power in 1975, WFTV rode the rising fortunes of the ABC network in the late 1970s to become the top-rated station in Central Florida. The five companies agreed to a settlement, approved in 1981, that gave all of them varying shares of the station and ended what was then the longest proceeding in FCC history, filling 55 volumes. Many of their 67 shareholders became millionaires when SFN Companies purchased WFTV in 1984 as part of its expansion into the broadcasting industry.

SFN made a $60 million profit within a year by selling the station to Cox in 1985. Cox moved the station to newer, larger studios at its present site in 1990. Although it has faced renewed ratings competition since 2000, WFTV continues to lead ratings in the Orlando–Daytona Beach market.

== History ==
=== Permitting and construction ===
Channel 9 was assigned to Orlando in 1952, when the Federal Communications Commission (FCC) lifted a four-year freeze on television station grants. Throughout 1952, several applications were received for channel 9 from local radio stations: WHOO, WORZ, and WLOF. Applications poured in for channel 9, while groups were initially reticent to challenge WDBO for channel 6. However, channel 6 and ultra high frequency (UHF) channel 18 also gained competing proposals. By April 1953, seven groups were seeking three channels, and Orlando was still without television.

In November 1953, WLOF was sold to a group led by Joseph Brechner and John Kluge, and its original application for channel 9 was replaced by one filed by the new ownership under the name Mid-Florida Television Corporation. The new owners also moved the radio station to a new site in Orlo Vista in preparation for eventual television operations. WHOO's owner, Ed Lamb, became caught up in a proceeding questioning his loyalty to the American government and alleged associations with communist groups. His character became a point of discussion in hearings called for the three applicants for channel 9 in July 1954. On November 2, WHOO bowed out of the contest, leaving WLOF and WORZ competing for channel 9. The remaining applicants attended hearings in Washington in December.

FCC hearing examiner Basil Cooper recommended WORZ's application for approval in an initial decision released in August 1955. He noted that WORZ was locally owned and had rendered better service to Orlando than WLOF, whose owners were from the Washington area. Mid-Florida Television appealed the decision. The chair of the FCC's Broadcast Bureau refuted many of Cooper's findings as "erroneous" in a report released in October, and the case came to the full FCC in June 1956. There, both parties questioned the other's conduct. Mid-Florida emphasized the role of Will O. Murrell, a lawyer suspended for a year by the Florida Bar, in the WORZ application, while WORZ noted a letter sent by WLOF principal Hyman Roth on the matter. With a final decision from the FCC pending, in January 1957, Washington businessman Harris H. Thomson moved to buy a controlling interest in WLOF radio but not Mid-Florida Television.

On June 7, 1957, the FCC voted to grant channel 9 to Mid-Florida Television, the WLOF group, reversing the 1955 Cooper initial decision in favor of WORZ. (Note: By this time, it operated WKIS (AM) and WORZ (FM) in Orlando.) It cited Murrell's involvement in ownership. Mid-Florida announced it would begin negotiating for an affiliation with the NBC network "immediately" and constructing the television station. WORZ appealed to the United States Court of Appeals for the District of Columbia Circuit, believing the FCC to have overemphasized positive aspects of WLOF's application. In August, WLOF-TV filed for a maximum-power and maximum-height tower facility and initiated talks with ABC for network affiliation instead of NBC. Despite WORZ's protest, the FCC approved the technical changes in November.

WLOF-TV began broadcasting on February 1, 1958, as the second station in Orlando itself. Between Daytona Beach station WESH (channel 2) moving its tower closer to Orlando, making it the NBC affiliate for both cities, and the launch of WLOF-TV, Central Florida at last had three stations airing the programming of the three major networks; ABC programs migrated from Orlando's WDBO-TV (channel 6) and WESH in the weeks that followed.

=== Ex parte influence scandal ===
As WLOF-TV was getting on the air, a scandal involving the FCC's decisions in several contested television station cases exploded into view. In January 1958, syndicated columnist Drew Pearson published a column alleging that FCC commissioner Richard Mack, a Florida native, had been influenced to switch the approval of channel 10 in Miami to a company affiliated with National Airlines. The resulting congressional investigation uncovered other cases of ex parte communications between attorneys and FCC commissioners on matters before the commission. Among the proceedings the committee investigated was that of channel 9 in Orlando. Stephen J. Angland, an investigator for the committee, testified that William H. Dial, an attorney working for Mid-Florida Television, had contacted Mack; Dial noted they had gone to dinner several times, though not while he was engaged with Mid-Florida. As a result, in early October 1958, the FCC began a staff investigation into any irregularities in the channel 9 award. At the time, the Court of Appeals had affirmed Mid-Florida's 1957 grant, and WORZ was appealing to the Supreme Court of the United States. The House committee's findings led the court, on a 7–2 vote, to remand the case to the appeals court for further hearings in late October.

WORZ objected to the FCC's decision to conduct a staff investigation and requested a formal inquiry before a hearing examiner; the FCC showed openness to this request in February 1959 and announced it would do so in March, pending the appeals court proceedings. At the end of that year, Kluge sold his interest in the television station to Brechner. After the appeals court remanded the matter to the FCC, the commission named chief hearing examiner James D. Cunningham to hear the case in February 1961 and set hearing dates in May. Cunningham's initial decision, released in September, recommended that Mid-Florida be stripped of the right to broadcast on channel 9 due to what he called "improper influences" by Dial on Mack. He also suggested that Mid-Florida be disqualified and not allowed to apply for the channel. Mid-Florida objected, noting that Cunningham found that Dial had acted without the knowledge or consent of company officials, though he had said that the company could not have been unaware of his actions.

Mid-Florida asked for an appeal by the full FCC and blasted Cunningham's decision as based "on suppositions and conjecture", a move WORZ characterized as a "fantastic and frantic" stall tactic. The commission heard oral argument in May 1962, at which time Mid-Florida tried to differentiate its case from other ex parte actions as not being abetted by the station applicant, where WORZ asked for a four-month grant to get on the air, as the FCC had done in the WPST-TV case and another, for channel 7 in Miami. Mid-Florida appeared successful; in January 1963, the FCC filed a report with the Court of Appeals noting that the grant should be reconsidered although there was no wrongdoing by Mid-Florida officials because they were unaware of what Dial had done until the congressional investigation in 1958. The vote by commissioners to clear Mid-Florida was 4–1, with commissioner Newton N. Minow the only dissenter. Minow contended that Mid-Florida officials knew of Dial's advances.

In celebration of its fifth anniversary of signing on the air, WLOF-TV changed its call letters to WFTV (Wonderful Florida Television) on February 3, 1963.

=== Rehearing, new applicants, and interim operator ===
WORZ moved in February 1963 to challenge the FCC report to the Court of Appeals, claiming that the commission could not reverse some of the findings in the 1961 Cunningham report concerning the credibility of witnesses. In July, the appeals court sent the case back to the FCC, in its ruling adopting elements of Minow's dissent. It ordered the commission to hold oral argument to determine whether the grant should be continued for WFTV, go to WORZ, or possibly be reopened for new applicants for the channel. WORZ also attempted to have the Supreme Court overturn the FCC's decision and was rebuffed in 1964.

The suggestion of reopening the channel 9 file was taken up by the FCC's Broadcast Bureau, which urged the commission to take new applications; commission members were said to be unenthusiastic about the idea. Pat Valicenti, attorney for the bureau, noted that the record had "grown stale" because of changes in ownership of Mid-Florida in the intervening years, particularly as the expertise of the original principals had been a major factor in the 1957 grant. The commission did not take up the Broadcast Bureau's call, disagreeing that the record was so stale as to not be useful, and in June 1964, it affirmed the grant and awarded a three-year full-term license to Mid-Florida Television Corporation for WFTV, allowing the station to stop operating under program test authority as it had for more than six years.

WORZ appealed to the Court of Appeals yet again; the court agreed with the Broadcast Bureau and the losing applicant that the record was stale. In March 1965, the case was returned to the FCC for a third time, this time with orders to allow new applicants to seek channel 9. The unsigned decision stated:

...[T]his case has been beset throughout by a variety of dubious circumstances which, at best, have prolonged the ultimate choice an unconscionably long period beyond the assembling of the facts upon which that choice must of necessity be based, and which, at worst, leave a nagging uncertainty as to whether so vital a community facility as is involved here should not be exposed to what may possibly be wider interests than those represented by these two applicants.

After the Supreme Court denied review of this decision on a petition from Mid-Florida, new applicants began filing for channel 9 in late 1965 and early 1966. These included:

- Central Nine Corporation, a consortium of investors with the largest share held by Richard G. Danner, a Washington attorney. Other stockholders included former Orlando mayor J. Rolfe Davis and Benjamin Smathers, who resigned as director of WDBO parent Outlet Company to participate;
- Comint Corporation;
- Florida 9 Broadcasting Company;
- Florida Heartland Television, a consortium of investors including the Gay–Bell group that owned WLEX-TV in Lexington, Kentucky, and WCOV-TV in Montgomery, Alabama;
- Howard Weiss, an attorney from Chicago, in representation of a group from that city;
- Mid-Florida Television Corporation;
- Orange Nine, Inc., a successor to WORZ, Inc., owned by the Murrell family;
- TV-9, Inc., headed by Rollins College president Hugh McKean.

Five of the applicants—Central Nine, Florida Heartland, Orange Nine, and TV-9—plus attorney Howard A. Weiss formed Consolidated Nine, Inc., to request interim operating authority to run the channel while the FCC determined its final licensee, with Comint, Florida 9, and Mid-Florida eligible to buy shares later. Though the Murrells initially filed with their new company, in September, they withdrew their application to permanently run channel 9 after 14 years of legal wrangling under WORZ, Inc., and Orange Nine. The Murrells made the decision because they believed the FCC had no intention of forcing Mid-Florida to cease broadcasting on channel 9 or set a hearing on the matter "in the near future". Initially, the FCC rebuffed efforts to have an immediate new operator for channel 9 by giving Mid-Florida authority to run it on an interim basis in April 1967, believing allowing WFTV to continue with its present operators served the public interest. At the same time, the FCC designated the case for a full comparative hearing of the applicants' qualifications.

In September 1968, the Court of Appeals ordered the FCC to consider the interim operating authority requests from competing applicants for channel 9 and channel 12 in Jacksonville, which also was embroiled in a similar case. After the issuance of that order, in lieu of appealing, Mid-Florida offered to cooperate with the other five applicants—Weiss no longer in the running. Under the arrangement proposed, Joseph Brechner and his wife would resign; all station staff would remain; Mid-Florida would lease the facilities to the operator at a fair rate; and station profits would be donated to charity or cultural institutions. While rejecting some of the proposed conditions, the FCC awarded interim operating authority to Consolidated Nine (consisting of Central Nine, Florida Heartland, Orange Nine, and TV-9) on January 10, 1969. Orange Nine, having previously withdrawn its bid for the permanent channel 9 license, withdrew from seeking interim authority in late January. Meanwhile, the comparative hearing to determine the full-time owner of the channel began in March. Brechner later told a reporter, "I was on the witness stand for 8 1/2 days, with four lawyers quizzing me. I came back to Orlando and had a heart attack."

On April 1, 1969, Mid-Florida turned over operating control of WFTV to the new interim operator, which had changed its name to Channel Nine of Orlando, Inc.; after Orange Nine's exit, Comint had joined the consortium. A representative of each of the five firms—Central Nine, Comint, Florida Heartland, Mid-Florida, and TV-9—sat on the governing board that controlled the station's affairs. Brechner's exit was more definitive: Mid-Florida took out a full-page ad in the Orlando Evening Star the next day, titled "Until We Meet Again", with photos of Brechner and other station executives and a list of awards WFTV had received in its more than 11 years under the company's ownership. It also expressed hope that Mid-Florida would become the permanent operator again, promising a "vigorous presentation of its qualifications" in the FCC proceedings.

=== Channel 9 case in the 1970s: Minority ownership and Martin Segal ===
In early June 1970, FCC examiner Herbert Sharfman released his initial decision in the WFTV case, a document described as "book-length" by Broadcasting magazine. He found in favor of Mid-Florida and described it as "clearly" preferred for its integration of ownership and management (station stockholders also participating as senior managers). This was because Joseph Brechner and his wife, Marion, would run the station—as they had prior to 1969—and controlled 62 percent of the company. The initial decision was appealed to the FCC's review board, which concurred with the decision favoring Mid-Florida in January 1972 and also highlighted its "unusually good past broadcast record".

After the full FCC affirmed the grant in September, the other four companies seeking the station appealed to the D.C. Circuit Court of Appeals. A year later, a three-judge panel of the Court of Appeals led by Charles Fahy returned the matter to the FCC, this time issuing new instructions to the commission on two issues: minority ownership and the character of one of Mid-Florida's directors. Two Black men each held seven percent of Comint, and the court ordered the FCC to consider and prioritize minority ownership when it would be "likely to increase diversity of content, especially of opinion and viewpoint". The decision also noted that there were no Black-owned broadcast media in Orlando, a city which at the time was 25 percent Black.

The decision also highlighted a new issue negatively affecting Mid-Florida. Martin Segal, an Orlando attorney, had sat on the board of directors of Mid-Florida since 1962, when he became the firm's general counsel and acquired 1.5 percent of its stock. On the night of October 27, 1971, a family fight devolved into Martin's wife shooting Martin and then herself; Martin survived, while she died. On November 1, Segal was one of 60 people indicted as part of an FBI investigation into illegal gambling in Central Florida. In the wake of these events, Segal resigned from his director position with Mid-Florida, though he was never tried owing to his health; he had become a paraplegic. In its order, the appeals court directed the FCC to investigate the company's basic character qualifications to be a broadcast licensee.

The section of the ruling pertaining to minority ownership, in the eyes of the FCC, constituted a rewriting of the commission's rules and led the FCC to request an en banc rehearing of the Court of Appeals ruling. One FCC lawyer believed the judges to have "misapplied and blurred" sections of the commission's comparative qualification priorities, set out in 1965. The case was reheard by the full bench, which upheld the November 1973 ruling on a 5–4 vote; the Supreme Court let the decision stand over the dissent of Justice Harry Blackmun in November 1974. This augured another reopening of the record in the WFTV case; one private attorney said of it, "Everyone will litigate the hell out of how much weight should be given to Comint's two Blacks."

In June 1975, the FCC set more hearings on the matter. The minority ownership issue attracted a new party to the long-running proceedings. The Office of Communication of the United Church of Christ (UCC) had previously been active in the WLBT license challenge in Jackson, Mississippi, leading a successful effort to have the license pulled from its original owners for its lack of attention to the Black community and censoring of civil rights stories in national news programming. Sensing the possibility that the channel 9 case could be a precedent, the UCC petitioned to become a party in the case. The case was a substantial source of paper records and attorneys' fees. Brechner estimated that each of the parties to the channel 9 case was paying $15,000 to $25,000 a year for legal representation. Per David Wilkening of the Sentinel Star in 1975:

In the public reference room of the FCC headquarters [in Washington], the file on Channel 9 covers 37 volumes, each as thick as a New York telephone book.

The new comparative hearing round ended with administrative law judge Daniel Kraushaar issuing an initial decision in December 1977. Yet again, Mid-Florida emerged as the most qualified applicant to run channel 9, dismissing the Segal line of argument and favoring the Brechner group because of its high integration of ownership and management. He also took aim at the FCC's handling of the long-running proceeding, calling it a "'tasteless monstrosity'". Comint, Florida Heartland, and TV-9 all announced their intention to appeal. In their appeals to the FCC review board, they charged that Kraushaar had been biased in favor of Segal in his findings. The review board agreed, finding his participation a "substantial character blemish" for Mid-Florida. However, the review board's ruling prioritized integration of ownership and management over racial diversity, in part citing a very recent commission decision that upheld the renewal of WPIX in New York City; the board indicated that if that had gone the other way, Comint might have won, and it expressed some frustration at having to follow that decision. On those grounds, the next most integrated applicant was favored: TV-9, Inc. Holders of 47.5 percent of the company's stock would be involved in management, more than with any of the other contenders for the license. The decision would be left to the full commission, with Comint and TV-9 the leading applicants.

Under joint venture operation, WFTV had grown considerably during the 1970s. A new transmitting tower at Bithlo had been proposed since 1966 as a joint venture with WDBO-TV; this was activated in 1970, replacing the mast at its Orlo Vista site. The 1,549-foot (472 m) tower had been delayed a year because of manufacturing issues at General Electric.

The tower collapsed on June 8, 1973, while workers were installing an antenna for public station WMFE-TV; two people died. WFTV was able to get on air within three days by mounting an antenna on a 320-foot (98 m) tower loaned by Southern Bell. The collapse had a substantial impact on ratings for the three local stations: an unaffected WESH took the lead in news, while leader WDBO sank to second and WFTV remained in third. WFTV was the first of the three television stations affected to transmit from the replacement tower on the site, switching in October 1975. By 1978, bolstered by an ascendant ABC and changes to its newscasts, WFTV was the number-one station in Central Florida, leading with its noon and 11 p.m. newscasts.

=== Settlement and sale to SFN ===
The FCC's longest-running proceeding began to come to an end in 1980. That October, the five companies filed the outlines of a settlement agreement between them which would see the station license granted to a joint venture composed of all five. By then, the channel 9 case had come to fill 55 volumes. Under the terms of the agreement, Mid-Florida, Comint, and TV-9 would each receive a 28 1/3-percent capital interest and slightly less in income, with Florida Heartland Television receiving ten percent and Central Nine five percent. Mid-Florida would receive $3.5 million for the sale of the station's assets to the joint venture. Comint's Black stockholders would also receive the option to buy an additional 14 percent three years after approval, while the United Church of Christ was reimbursed by Channel Nine of Orlando for nearly $35,000 in legal fees. The FCC approved the settlement in July 1981, ending more than 12 years of interim operation.

After the settlement was approved, the five-company consortium received constant inquiries about selling WFTV. In 1983, the FCC allowed stations to be sold after less than three years of ownership. In the year ending in February 1984, James Robinson of Comint estimated that he had fielded 30 expressions of interest in buying the station. On February 22, 1984, the companies agreed to sell WFTV to SFN Companies of Glenview, Illinois, for $125 million—double to triple the appraisal of $40 to $50 million given in 1980. SFN had just begun expanding into broadcasting by purchasing Western Broadcasting Company, with radio and television stations in Montana, Georgia, and Puerto Rico. It managed to secure the deal by being swift. SFN CEO John R. Purcell had heard from a source in February that an unnamed station in a Sun Belt market might be available; after figuring out the station was WFTV, he wrote to its owners expressing interest, visited it within the week, and within 26 hours had agreed to the $125 million acquisition, minutes before WFTV received a $135 million offer from a larger company. Many of the 67 shareholders in WFTV's five owning companies became millionaires after the sale closed. Walter Windsor, who had been general manager since the joint venture ownership began in 1969, became the president of the new SFN Communications division, then retired in early 1985.

=== Cox ownership ===
SFN announced the sale of WFTV to Cox Broadcasting for $185 million in June 1985—an increase of $60 million in value in a year. SFN had not intended to sell the station but had received several offers. The sale was particularly satisfying for SFN management, including Purcell, which had been criticized by industry analysts for purchasing the station in the first place: SFN stock declined when the news was announced, and Forbes anticipated a "pretty low return" for the company on its Orlando TV station investment. It also marked the first acquisition for Cox since the FCC had raised television station ownership limits from seven to twelve the year before. Cox closed on the sale in September.

Among the first priorities for Cox was investing in the station's facilities. WFTV had outgrown its original Central Boulevard studio, which had received multiple expansions making its layout complicated, and WFTV's general manager discussed a possible new building with Cox when they bought the station. In August 1987, the station announced it would relocate to a site on South Street in downtown Orlando; the building would be 70,000 square feet (6,500 m^{2}), nearly twice the Central Boulevard building, with two studios for production. The first newscast from the new studios was aired on January 1, 1990. The second studio also enabled WFTV to take on non-news projects: it was used by The Adventures of Superboy, which mostly filmed at Universal Studios Florida.

In 1995, WFTV signed a time brokerage agreement with former reporter Marsha Reece, holder of a construction permit for WZWY (channel 27), which it proposed to program. Issues in selecting a location for a tower site stalled the channel 27 project, but the station debuted as WRDQ on April 23, 2000. WRDQ airs newscasts from WFTV and is also used in an overflow capacity. From May to July 2011, ABC daytime programming was moved over to sister station WRDQ due to WFTV's wall-to-wall coverage of the Casey Anthony trial; this practice was repeated to accommodate coverage of the George Zimmerman trial in 2013.

Though Ocala and Marion County are drawn into the Orlando market, WFTV's signal overlaps with WCJB-TV of Gainesville in this area. In 1998, the Cox Communications cable system in Ocala removed WFTV from its lineup to keep just one ABC affiliate. However, this was reversed in July 2006, when WFTV was restored to the Ocala system.

On July 24, 2018, Cox Enterprises announced that it was "exploring strategic options" for Cox Media Group's television stations, including WFTV, which the company said could involve "partnering or merging these stations into a larger TV company." Cox Media Group's president, Kim Guthrie, subsequently clarified to trade publication Radio & Television Business Report that the company was solely seeking "a merger or partnership" and not an outright sale of the television stations.

In February 2019, it was announced that Apollo Global Management would acquire Cox Media Group and Northwest Broadcasting's stations. Although the group planned to do business as Terrier Media, it was later announced in June 2019 that Apollo would also acquire Cox's radio and advertising businesses and retain the Cox Media Group name. The sale was completed on December 17, 2019.

In August 2026, the Orlando Magic announced a deal with Cox Media Group to air games on WFTV and sister station WRDQ beginning in the 2026–27 season.

== News operation ==
Prior to the mid-1970s, WFTV had been the traditional third-rated station in Central Florida. The news product was not the laggard, but the ABC network and signal compared poorly to its competitors. Several efforts were made by station management to improve the situation; one such attempt in 1975 saw John Tesh, later host of Entertainment Tonight, become the main anchor of its Eyewitness News newscasts.

After the replacement Bithlo tower was put into place in 1975, the station started a significant turnaround. In 1976, WFTV hired Robert Jordan, then the news anchor and director at WKRG-TV in Mobile, Alabama. An increased willingness to invest in news led to additional money for the news department and an overhaul of the news product. Jordan also hired Carole Nelson, who had come to Orlando to host a talk show on the failed WSWB (channel 35); she moved to WFTV and hosted the station's midday newscast. By 1978, WFTV had zoomed into the lead in midday and late news, though it still was behind WESH in early evening news coverage. Jordan, who had three separate stints as WFTV news director (1976–1981, 1982–1986, 2002–2012), also hired some of the station's most recognizable personalities in the decades that followed, including anchor Bob Opsahl. The station also gradually expanded its news offerings with 5:30 p.m. news (1981) and a morning newscast (1984).

However, the lead for WFTV has narrowed at times since the turn of the millennium with more vigorous competition from WKMG-TV and WESH, which pulled closer particularly in late news. From 1996 to 2001, the station lost 40 percent of its viewers in late news, in part due to weakness in ABC's prime time lineup. As a result, in 2002, Cox hired Jordan—the architect of the station's original rise to ratings—to work at WFTV for the third time. Even though the newscasts were facing ratings difficulties and WFTV had five news directors in six years, it still led the Orlando market in advertising revenue, and it still retained a healthy lead for its early evening newscasts. Among Jordan's moves was to lure Martie Salt, whom he had hired at WFTS-TV in Tampa when that station started news in 1994 and there was no chance for her to be a lead anchor at WFTV, back to Orlando; she reunited with Opsahl on the anchor desk. (Note: Salt was known as Martie Tucker, her married name, in Tampa.) Rehiring Salt turned out to be a successful move in reversing WFTV's flagging ratings fortunes; she spent 16 years at the station, the last few as the noon anchor, before retiring in 2019. She had been preceded in retiring by Opsahl, who left in 2016.

On June 29, 2006, channel 9 became the first station in Florida, the first station owned by Cox, and the tenth in the country to begin broadcasting its local newscasts in high definition. The station debuted a 4 p.m. newscast in 2013, expanding it to a full hour after just a month on the air.

Alongside its own Eyewitness News shows, WFTV has also been producing a nightly 10 p.m. newscast since the 1990s. WFTV first produced a 10 p.m. newscast for WRBW (channel 65) in April 1997. In 2002, WRDQ began airing the newscast. It added a weekday morning newscast at 7 a.m. on WRDQ in 2007 and a half-hour 6:30 p.m. newscast on that station in 2010. The latter was discontinued in 2013, though the next year the 10 p.m. news was expanded to an hour to provide stronger competition for Fox station WOFL.

=== Notable current on-air staff ===
- Tom Terry – chief meteorologist (joined 2002)

=== Notable former on-air staff ===
- Jim Barach – meteorologist, 1996–1999
- Dennis Bounds – weekend anchor, 1978–1980
- Pete Delkus – sports department intern and meteorologist, 1993–1996
- Vanessa Echols – anchor, 1993–2022
- Tamsen Fadal – reporter
- Bud Hedinger – anchor, 1986–1989
- Deborah Roberts – NASA/Brevard County Bureau chief reporter/weekend anchor, 1987–1990; later of NBC News and ABC News
- Kent Shocknek – anchor and reporter, 1980–1983 (known as Kent Schoknecht in Orlando)
- Rob Stafford – reporter, later correspondent for Dateline NBC
- Leland Vittert – anchor
- Barbara West – anchor and reporter, 1987–2010

== Technical information ==
=== Subchannels ===
WFTV's primary transmitter is located near Bithlo, Florida, with a digital replacement translator at Deltona in Volusia County. The station's signal is multiplexed, using different minor channel numbers from each transmitter:

Subchannels of WFTV
| Subchannel | | Res. | Short name | Programming |
| Bithlo | Deltona | Res. | Short name | Programming |
|---|---|---|---|---|
| 9.1 | 9.11 | 720p | WFTV | ABC |
| 9.2 | 9.12 | 480i | Laff | Laff |
| 9.3 | 9.13 | 480i | Mystery | Ion Mystery |
| 9.4 | 9.14 | 480i | MeToons | MeTV Toons |
| 65.4 | 65.14 | 480i | Grio. | QVC2 (WRBW) |

Broadcast on behalf of another station

The 2000s saw the WFTV transition to digital and high-definition broadcasting. WFTV was the first Orlando station to broadcast a digital signal, beginning in April 2001. WFTV ended programming on its analog signal, on VHF channel 9, on June 12, 2009, as part of the federally mandated transition from analog to digital television; it continued to broadcast in digital on UHF channel 39, using virtual channel 9.

In 2010, WFTV launched a weather channel (9.2) and announced that it would add a simulcast of GenTV affiliate WAWA-LD on a third subchannel. However, before the subchannel could launch, WAWA's chief investor pulled out, effectively closing that station and dissolving the partnership with WFTV.

In January 2020, WFTV completed repack work to move from channel 39 to 35; while antenna work was done, the station broadcast from a backup site at St. Cloud, some 16 miles (26 km) south of Christmas.
