= Vanessa Echols =

American journalist

Vanessa Lorraine Echols (born November 8, 1960) is a former television journalist and was the noon and 4pm news anchor at WFTV in Orlando, Florida, until her retirement on May 25, 2022.

Echols was born in Auburn, Alabama, attending Auburn High School and later majoring in broadcast journalism at the University of Alabama. She subsequently worked for a radio station in Tuscaloosa, Alabama, and television stations in Georgia and Tennessee, including WMAZ-TV in Macon, Georgia. In 1992, Echols began anchoring WFTV's Eyewitness News Daybreak and Eyewitness News at Noon. In 2007, she was named anchor of a new morning news program, Eyewitness News This Morning, on WFTV's sister station WRDQ.

Echols anchored her final newscast of her career, which was Eyewitness News at 6 alongside Greg Warmoth (father of WKMG-TV anchor Justin Warmoth), on May 25, 2022.

Echols is a breast cancer survivor, and has served as honorary chairman for the Susan G. Komen Central Florida Race for the Cure and was keynote speaker for the University of Central Florida's 2006 Breast Cancer Update conference.
