= WDSC-TV =

Television station in New Smyrna Beach, Florida

- New Smyrna Beach–Daytona Beach–; Orlando, Florida; United States
- City: New Smyrna Beach, Florida
- Channels: Digital: 24 (UHF); Virtual: 15
- Branding: Channel 15

Programming
- Affiliations: 15.1: Educational Ind.; 15.2: The Florida Channel; 15.3: Deutsche Welle

Ownership
- Owner: Daytona State College, Inc.

History
- First air date: February 8, 1988
- Former call signs: WCEU (1988–2008)
- Former channel numbers: Analog: 15 (UHF, 1988–2008); Digital: 33 (UHF, until 2019)
- Former affiliations: PBS (1988–2011)
- Call sign meaning: Daytona State College

Technical information
- Licensing authority: FCC
- Facility ID: 12171
- ERP: 282 kW
- HAAT: 490.4 m (1,609 ft)
- Transmitter coordinates: 28°36′36″N 81°3′34″W

Links
- Public license information: Public file; LMS
- Website: www.daytonastate.edu/in-the-community/wdsc/index.html

WDSC-TV (channel 15) is an independent non-commercial educational television station licensed to New Smyrna Beach, Florida, United States, serving the Orlando area. Owned by Daytona State College, the station maintains studios at the Center for Educational Telecommunications (Building 400) on the DSC campus on Heinemann Street in Daytona Beach, and its transmitter is located on Brown Road near Christmas, Florida.

== History ==
In 1985, DSC (then known as Daytona Beach Community College), Bethune–Cookman College, Stetson University, Embry-Riddle Aeronautical University and the Atlantic Center for the Arts formed the Coastal Educational Broadcasters consortium in order to bring a public television station to Volusia and Flagler counties. They felt WMFE-TV, the PBS station in Orlando, was neglecting Daytona Beach. Channel 15 signed on February 8, 1988, as WCEU with a limited schedule of three hours a day, three days a week. Support in the area was enough that within nine months, it was recognized by the Corporation for Public Broadcasting. By January 1989, it was a full-fledged PBS member station, though it did not expand to a fuller broadcast day until 1993.

In 1992, a signal expansion and must-carry rules expanded WCEU's audience to over 1.3 million viewers in Central Florida, including Orlando itself. It moved to its current facility in 1999. DBCC became the sole licensee in 2002.

In 2005, WCEU rebranded itself as "DBCC 15" to better reflect its relationship with DBCC. In January 2008, it rebranded itself again merely as "Channel 15", after DBCC became Daytona Beach College. The college subsequently changed its name again to Daytona State College; to reflect this, in October 2008, channel 15 changed its call letters to the current WDSC-TV, after purchasing the rights to the call letters from a radio station in Dillon, South Carolina.

With the advent of digital broadcasting, WDSC-TV began billing itself as a full-market PBS station, including Orlando. While it had been available on cable in Orlando for over a decade, its digital signal, located in Bithlo with most other television stations in the market, gives it an over-the-air coverage area comparable to the market's previous primary PBS station WMFE-TV. However, on June 16, 2011, WDSC and PBS announced that the station would leave PBS, as Daytona State College could no longer afford to purchase its programming, following $4.8 million of funding to Florida's public radio and television stations vetoed by Governor Rick Scott in May 2011. PBS programming disappeared from channel 15 on July 1, 2011; WMFE also left PBS on the same date due to its then-planned sale to religious broadcaster Daystar. These moves left WBCC of Cocoa, which began branding as WUCF-TV at that time, as the only PBS station in the Central Florida television market. (WUCF-TV moved to the former WMFE-TV in 2012, a move that led to WBCC, now WEFS, departing PBS as well.)

WDSC-TV continues to air programming from other sources such as the BBC, American Public Television and the National Educational Telecommunications Association.

In 2024, it was announced that WDSC-TV would be the flagship station of The Joy of Painting with Nicholas Hankins, the unfinished 32nd season of the program that Bob Ross had started but died before production could begin. Further new seasons with Hankins have since been commissioned, all originating from WDSC-TV.

== Technical information ==
=== Subchannels ===
The station's signal is multiplexed:

Subchannels of WDSC-TV
Subchannel	Res.	Short name	Programming
15.1	1080i	WDSC-HD	Main WDSC-TV programming
15.2	480i	WDSC-ED	The Florida Channel
15.3	480i	WDSC-WV	Deutsche Welle

=== Analog-to-digital conversion ===
WDSC-TV shut down its analog signal, over UHF channel 15, which due to major equipment failure had been operating at significantly reduced power since September 25, 2008, on December 15 of that year. The station's digital signal continued to broadcast on its pre-transition UHF channel 33, using virtual channel 15.
