= John Bersia =

American journalist (1956–2019)

- Born: November 23, 1956; Orlando, Florida, United States
- Died: March 21, 2019 (aged 62); Altamonte Springs, Florida, United States
- Occupations: Journalist; Professor of international issues

Academic background
- Education: University of Central Florida; Georgetown University; American University; London School of Economics

Academic work
- Discipline: Political scientist
- Institutions: University of Central Florida

John C. Bersia (November 23, 1956 – March 21, 2019), a Pulitzer Prize winner in 2000, was a global educator and commentator. He served as Special Assistant to the President for Global Perspectives, as Director of the Global Perspectives Office and as a University Professor at the University of Central Florida. Bersia previously served as an adjunct professor in the Hamilton Holt School at Rollins College where he taught classes in international affairs. He was also the Executive Producer and host of the weekly "Global Perspectives Show" on WUCF-TV/PBS, and wrote on foreign affairs.

Bersia previously served as a Foreign-Affairs Columnist for McClatchy-Tribune Information Services and the Orlando Sentinel, as well as on the latter's Editorial Board. He won the first Pulitzer Prize of the 21st century for the Orlando Sentinel, as well as for its parent organization, the Tribune Company. Additionally, he was the recipient of the Walker Stone Award of the Scripps Howard Foundation, the first-place “Green Eyeshade” editorials award of the Society of Professional Journalists, the annual Media Award for Editorial Excellence of The National Association of Consumer Advocates and other national awards.

Before his journalism experience, Bersia worked in the global political-risk analysis and publishing businesses, as well as for the U.S. government. He is the author of World War 4: Confronting Terrorism (2003), serves as Editor of the Worldviews for the 21st Century monograph series, is Interim Co-Chair of The India Center at UCF; co-chairs the UCF Middle Eastern Studies Program; chairs and directs UCF programs on human trafficking awareness and small countries; and chairs and co-directs UCF programs on China-Taiwan issues, global peace and security, and Kurdish political studies. Further, he was the Chair (a voluntary position) of the Global Connections Foundation, a non-profit, non-ideological, non-political, regional, educational network that promotes international awareness and understanding.

Bersia pursued undergraduate studies at Clark University and the University of Central Florida, receiving a Bachelor of Arts in Political Science/International Relations and French from UCF; was awarded a Master of Arts in Government/Foreign Policy from Georgetown University's Graduate School; completed a Master of Science in Public Information Administration at The American University's College of Business Administration; and received a Master of Science in International Relations from the London School of Economics and Political Science, University of London.

Bersia died on March 21, 2019, at the age of 62.
