= Lisa Colagrossi =

American journalist

- Born: May 9, 1965; Cleveland, Ohio, U.S.
- Died: March 20, 2015 (aged 49); New York, New York, U.S.
- Occupations: radio/television news anchor, news reporter, journalist
- Years active: 1988–2015
- Spouse: Todd Crawford (m. 1998–2015)
- Children: 2

Lisa Colagrossi (May 9, 1965 – March 20, 2015) was an American journalist and television news anchor and reporter. She was a reporter for WABC-TV In New York City from September 2001 until her death on March 20, 2015.

== Career ==
Prior to joining the WABC-TV Eyewitness News team, she was an anchor at WKMG-TV in Orlando.

She came to New York from Orlando, Florida. Her career in journalism began in West Virginia, where she attended West Virginia University. She also worked in her hometown of Cleveland, Ohio at WKYC-TV, the NBC-TV affiliate there. In addition to working in Ohio, Colagrossi also worked at news stations in Mobile, Alabama and West Virginia.

During her run in New York, Colagrossi received several Emmy award nominations. She won two Suncoast Regional Emmy Awards for her anchoring in Florida. She was a member of the Society of Professional Journalists.

In early 2009, Colagrossi became business reporter on the Eyewitness News This Morning and Noon broadcasts, although she still frequently did breaking news reporting.

== Personal life ==
Colagrossi resided with her husband Todd and sons in Stamford, Connecticut.

== Death ==
On March 19, 2015, Colagrossi was on her way back to the station after filing a report on a house fire in Queens. As she sat in the news van, Colagrossi began feeling ill and her condition quickly worsened. The cameraman who accompanied her to the story got out of the van and flagged down an ambulance and she was transported to NewYork–Presbyterian Hospital/Weill Cornell Medical Center, where it was discovered she had suffered a massive cerebral hemorrhage caused by a ruptured aneurysm. Colagrossi was immediately taken to the intensive care unit and placed on life support, but doctors were unable to save her, and she died the next day.
