= WUCF-TV =

Television station in Orlando, Florida

- Orlando, Florida; United States
- Channels: Digital: 34 (UHF); Virtual: 24
- Branding: WUCF PBS

Programming
- Affiliations: 24.1: PBS; for others, see § Subchannels

Ownership
- Owner: University of Central Florida; (University of Central Florida Board of Trustees)
- Sister stations: WUCF-FM

History
- First air date: March 15, 1965
- Former call signs: WMFE-TV (1965–2012)
- Former channel numbers: Analog: 24 (UHF, 1965–2009); Digital: 23 (UHF, 2003–2020)
- Former affiliations: NET (1970); PBS (1970–2011); V-me (2011–2012)
- Call sign meaning: University of Central Florida

Technical information
- Licensing authority: FCC
- Facility ID: 12855
- ERP: 1,000 kW
- HAAT: 379.6 m (1,245 ft)
- Transmitter coordinates: 28°36′8″N 81°5′36″W

Links
- Public license information: Public file; LMS
- Website: www.wucf.org

WUCF-TV (channel 24) is a PBS member television station in Orlando, Florida, United States, owned by the University of Central Florida (UCF). WUCF-TV and WUCF-FM 89.9, a jazz music radio station, operate from studios on Research Parkway on the UCF campus. WUCF-TV and the unaffiliated religious station WTGL (channel 45) transmit using WUCF-TV's spectrum from a tower near Bithlo.

Orlando's channel 24 went on the air as WMFE-TV on March 15, 1965. It was put on the air by a consortium of county school systems and initially served exclusively to provide daytime instructional programs for Central Florida schools. It was transferred to Orange County school board control in 1967 and to a community board of directors in 1970, coinciding with its expansion into non-instructional public programming. At the time, Orlando was the largest Florida city without public television programming. In 1975, the station began broadcasting from Bithlo, giving it a full-market signal. WMFE-TV operated from the Mid-Florida Technical Institute until 1978, when it bought and moved into the studios formerly used by the failed commercial station WSWB-TV. The facility provided the springboard for WMFE's entry into public radio, with WMFE-FM 90.7 launching in 1980.

Over the course of the 1980s, 1990s, and 2000s, WMFE-TV's emphasis on local programming fluctuated considerably, with expansions often followed by cutbacks and cancellations. It aired fewer PBS programs than most primary PBS stations in comparably sized markets and, despite high viewership, struggled with lower-than-average rates of viewer donation and corporate support. In the meantime, two community college–owned TV stations started in areas overlapping WMFE-TV: WCEU (now WDSC-TV) in Daytona Beach) and WBCC in Cocoa, which began airing PBS programming in 1989 and 2002, respectively. The presence of these stations created a "triple overlap" that harmed WMFE-TV's finances. After severe cutbacks during the Great Recession and with support for WMFE-TV dropping while WMFE-FM grew, WMFE opted to exit television in 2011 and agreed to sell channel 24 to an organization affiliated with the Daystar Television Network. On July 1, 2011, a partnership between WBCC and UCF known as WUCF TV became the sole PBS station in Central Florida as WMFE-TV and WDSC-TV disaffiliated. During this time, WMFE-TV aired the Spanish-language public network V-me. The deal with Daystar failed when the Federal Communications Commission questioned the buyer's qualifications to own an educational TV station license.

UCF acquired the WMFE-TV license and transmission facility in 2012 and made channel 24 the PBS station as WUCF-TV that November. The station's flagship local program, NewsNight, was canceled in 2025 amid the discontinuation of federal funding for public broadcasting.

== WMFE-TV ==
=== Early years ===
In April 1960, the Florida Central East Coast Educational Television Project was organized by the school systems of Brevard, Flagler, Indian River, Lake, Orange, Osceola, Seminole, and Volusia counties to develop an educational television system for the central part of the state. Educators at the time believed that a UHF station would ignore large sectors of the population. This was because, at the time, receiving UHF stations often required sets to be converted. They applied to the Federal Communications Commission (FCC) for the addition of VHF channel 11. At the time, the state had five operating educational TV stations, all on VHF, and only one commercial station on the UHF band. To get channel 11 assigned to Orlando would have required a waiver of the distance separation requirements to WINK-TV in Fort Myers. The FCC denied their proposal, finding that the lack of educational television in the area did not rise to the level of a "local emergency area" meriting an allocation, leaving them to either pursue appeals or to seek Orlando's already allocated educational channel, UHF channel 24.

With channel 11 infeasible, work turned to channel 24. The original proposal was to pair the UHF channel with six low-power translators on the VHF band. Within the span of a week, ground was broken for the new station's facilities at the Mid-Florida Technical Institute, and the FCC awarded a construction permit approving the planned station. At 8:20 a.m. on March 15, 1965, WMFE-TV made its broadcast debut with a daytime schedule of 13 long and 11 shorter programs. Replacing educational programs broadcast by the three commercial stations in Orlando, WMFE-TV broadcast a range of programs for in-school use from kindergarten through high school. Thirteen full-time teachers, only half of whom had on-camera experience, were brought on to present the programs. Not all schools in WMFE-TV's service area were adequately serviced; southern Brevard County and Cocoa Beach, did not get sufficient reception. After nearly three months, WMFE-TV went off the air with the end of the school year in early June and returned in September.

Nearly immediately, WMFE-TV struggled financially due to a lack of support. In early 1967, Volusia County withdrew from educational television, leaving only Flagler, Orange, and Seminole counties as participants in the system and sparking rumors of a possible closure. That year, the original live lessons were replaced by pre-taped versions, and twelve teachers returned to classroom duties as part of efforts to cut the budget by about 40 percent. Florida Central East Coast Educational Television reorganized to become entirely staffed by Orange County school board members and officials. Program production was halted for an entire year and resumed in 1968 after coming under full Orange County control.

While WMFE-TV was broadcasting to schools, it was not broadcasting other programming. By 1969, Orlando was the only major population center without program service from National Educational Television (NET) for non-school audiences. Late that year, a citizens' advisory committee was formed to guide WMFE-TV's non-school programming, and in March 1970, the Orange County school board ceded control of WMFE-TV to the community. On May 24, 1970, the station began airing evening public television programming from NET, which was supplanted by PBS later that year. This was further expanded in May 1971 when WMFE-TV became the last public television station in the country to air Mister Rogers' Neighborhood as part of its expansion into early evening hours. WMFE-TV still struggled financially during this period. In December 1972, it discovered that a station employee had embezzled more than $11,000 in funds and fabricated a $100,000 pledge. The nonexistence of the latter caused budgetary issues for the station. Between December 1972 and January 1973, it canceled its two local shows, Feedback and Rapport; discontinued Friday and Saturday night programming; and cut its staff by two-thirds.

In 1972, WMFE received federal and state funds to buy a new antenna and transmitter facility to be co-sited with WDBO-TV and WFTV at Bithlo, thereby increasing the coverage area and signal strength. After delays stemming from unexpected cost increases, on June 8, 1973, workers were on the mast installing the antenna when the tower collapsed; two people died. Losing the tower scuttled a planned expansion of WMFE-TV's educational services and kept the station limited to Orlando and nearby areas. The tower was rebuilt in 1975, and on November 17, the station began broadcasting with its increased power and height.

=== New studios and expansion into radio ===
In 1975, Orlando UHF station WSWB-TV (channel 35) went off the air. The Winter Park Federal Savings and Loan Association put the studio building up for sale, receiving two bids: Turner Communications, which was trying to put WSWB back on the air, and WMFE-TV, which was spurred to look for a new site because it could not grow at its existing location. WMFE won the bidding for the building on Colonial Drive, which was seen as the most cost-economical method of finding appropriate space. As part of receiving state funding for the purchase, the Florida Department of Education owned the property for four years. WMFE began using a satellite dish at the site to receive PBS programming in March 1978, and moved into the facility in September 1979. The facility was also WMFE's springboard into radio broadcasting, where WMFE-FM 90.7 began broadcasting on July 14, 1980.

After the new studio opened, WMFE increased its local programming output. By 1981, it had four local shows—Postscripts, Florida Focus, Sunshine Music Hall, and Florida Home Grown. This was down to two by 1986 when, in response to flat revenues and increased costs, the station dropped the two remaining weekly programs and pivoted its in-house production to documentaries. In spite of its popularity locally—with 285,000 viewers, it was one of the top 15 PBS stations in a mid-size market—and the growth of Orlando, WMFE-TV continued to program like a PBS station in a smaller market. In the 1980s, PBS offered its programs to member stations in two packages, a large package of 28 shows and a small package of 13. Most primary PBS stations in mid-size and larger markets took the larger package. WMFE-TV did not; it purchased the small package plus eight shows on an a la carte basis, leaving programs from Austin City Limits to Frontline unseen in Orlando. With the exception of KTEH in San Jose, California, a market also served by another public station, WMFE-TV was the only such station in the top 30 markets. In 1988, The Orlando Sentinel found that WMFE-TV carried the fewest locally produced programs of any major public TV station in Florida—one, Florida Home Grown—and was the only one not to produce any public affairs shows. This was in spite of a budget larger than WUFT in Gainesville or WSRE in Pensacola. The primary comparable station using the smaller package, WDCN in Nashville, Tennessee, still had a larger budget and more local programming. Station president Stephen M. Steck cited a lower rate of corporate underwriting for programs; many companies did not have headquarters in Orlando and were thus, per Steck, less likely to be home to decision-makers.

In 1990, WMFE launched an expansion of its studios. After research showed that there was a desire for WMFE radio and television to expand its local programming efforts, the station launched a series of new local programs, including a radio reading service broadcast on an audio subcarrier of channel 24, and a $3 million campaign to sustain them. The station needed the support amid declining prime-time audience figures, competition from cable, and a donation rate—4 percent of viewers contributed—that was less than half the national average. In 1996, station staffing peaked at 73 employees. WMFE served as one of seven test markets in 2000 for changes to the PBS program schedule designed to promote a uniform national lineup. The early 2000s brought the mandatory conversion from analog to digital television, which required the station to raise $8.1 million in equipment costs. On October 14, 2003, WMFE-DT began broadcasting on channel 23.

After 34 years as WMFE president, Steck retired from the position on January 1, 2006, and was replaced by operations manager José Fajardo. By that time, the station's staff had been cut down to 49, and a new strategy to once again reintroduce major local programming was underway with plans to launch a public affairs series, Central Florida Almanac, and a television version of the WMFE radio program Arts Connection.

=== Triple overlap, financial troubles, Daystar sale attempt and disaffiliation from PBS ===
Beginning in the late 1980s, WMFE-TV faced what was called the "triple overlap" problem with the creation of two new educational television stations which both began in 1988. First on the air was WCEU (channel 15, renamed WDSC-TV in 2008), owned by Daytona Beach Community College, which began in February 1988 and became a PBS member station on January 1, 1989. In Cocoa, Brevard Community College acquired WRES (channel 18) as part of a deal with Press Broadcasting, under which it moved to channel 68 as WBCC in 1991. This public station joined PBS on January 1, 2002. WMFE had been fearful of the impact of WCEU and WBCC on its operation for years prior to 2002. In 1995, it suggested that the Corporation for Public Broadcasting (CPB) cease making grants to secondary public TV stations and force consolidation of engineering operations, an idea that was poorly received by the other stations. Steck told The Daytona Beach News-Journal in 2000 that WCEU was increasingly airing the same programming as WMFE, which he called "disconcerting and confusing" to that station. CPB policies for funding stations in overlap markets like Orlando resulted in a $279,000 annual reduction of WMFE's grant payments. The other two stations paid less money to PBS, though they aired fewer shows.

The Great Recession, which began in 2008, hit WMFE-TV severely and harder than it did WMFE radio. WMFE radio and television laid off 10 employees in October 2008 and another 15 in February 2009, including the cancellation of Arts Connection, the only local TV program remaining on the channel 24 schedule. WMFE concentrated its local programming efforts on radio, which Fajardo said was cheaper and more impactful. The radio reading service was discontinued in July after the Florida state budget eliminated funding. When WMFE held fundraising drives for radio and television in late 2010, the radio drive surpassed its goal, while the television drive fell 43 percent short and forced smaller drives to try and reduce the gap. All of WMFE's employees were furloughed for two weeks.

In April 2011, WMFE announced that channel 24 would be sold and leave PBS amid the diverging financial fortunes of radio and television operations, a proposed increase in PBS dues, and what it called "critical uncertainties in federal and state funding". The station's announcement did not include a mention of the buyer or the purchase price—revealed in FCC filings as Community Educators of Orlando, a subsidiary of the Daystar Television Network, a Christian network. Much of the $3 million purchase price would be earmarked to pay past dues to PBS and possibly reimburse the Corporation for Public Broadcasting and other agencies. When news spread of the sale, a campaign was undertaken by local residents and students at the University of Central Florida (UCF) to try to keep an active PBS station in the Orlando market. The Orlando situation attracted the attention of other Florida public television stations and PBS president Paula Kerger.

The solution was led by WBCC and UCF. UCF had an existing relationship with WBCC; since 2004, WBCC had transmitted the university-programmed UCF TV as a digital subchannel. On May 26, 2011, the UCF Board of Trustees approved a partnership with Brevard Community College to create "WUCF TV", the new primary PBS station for Central Florida. The new station would lease WBCC's primary digital channel and operate from WBCC's facilities. However, WBCC would retain its license and call sign. On June 2, PBS approved the creation of "WUCF TV" and announced that it would become Central Florida's primary PBS channel. The station served as the Orlando market's only PBS station, as WDSC-TV in Daytona Beach left PBS on July 1, concurrent with WMFE's departure from PBS and the launch of "WUCF TV".

Without PBS programming and with the Daystar sale pending, on July 1, WMFE-TV began broadcasting V-me, a Spanish-language public TV network, and further reduced its staff to 23. The sale attracted more than 450 comments at the FCC and eventually hit an intractable problem with the commission. Daystar at the time was attempting to buy WMFE-TV and KWBU-TV in Waco, Texas, another failing public TV station. On March 13, 2012, the FCC sent letters to the Daystar entities trying to buy the stations over concerns they did not meet the local control and educational programming requirements of the commission and therefore might not be eligible to be licensees of noncommercial educational stations. The next day, WMFE called off the sale because the process had gone on so long. Independent Public Media, a group trying to buy distressed public TV stations and backed by public station founder John Schwartz, made an offer for WMFE-TV, in conjunction with a group led by former state legislator Dick Batchelor, but was rejected.

== WUCF-TV ==
On June 21, 2012, Community Communications announced that it would sell all of WMFE-TV's assets, except the studio facilities, to the University of Central Florida. With the acquisition of the WMFE-TV license, BCC and UCF announced that the operating agreement for channel 68 would be unwound once PBS programming returned to channel 24. This took place on November 15, 2012, when channel 24 became WUCF-TV and WBCC reverted to independent status. WUCF signed on without its own master control facility, a first in public television, and subcontracted those operations to WJCT in Jacksonville.

WUCF-TV's first executive director after the move to channel 24 was Polly Anderson, a former head of KNME-TV in Albuquerque, New Mexico, and chair of the Association of Public Television Stations. She vowed to raise the new station's profile in the community. During her time, WUCF-TV debuted Global Perspectives, a public affairs and interview program hosted by UCF professor John Bersia which aired until his 2019 death. Anderson left in 2015; it was later revealed, in documents obtained as part of a dispute at her next employer, the Oklahoma Educational Television Authority, that she had clashed with UCF officials, leading to her involuntary separation. The two sides accused each other of a toxic work culture, and UCF accused Anderson of obtaining a seat on the board of the Orlando Science Center by trading promotion, costing the station revenue. The station was led by Phil Hoffman from 2016 to 2021, during which time membership tripled to nearly 26,000; Hoffman was replaced by senior director of content and engagement Jennifer Cook on an interim basis before Cook became the full-time director in 2023.

In 2019, WUCF-TV debuted NewsNight, a weekly public affairs series consisting of a roundtable discussion with participants from various Central Florida media outlets. NewsNight was canceled in 2025 in reaction to state and federal cuts to public broadcasting support. In fiscal year 2024, WUCF radio and television had received 13 percent of their funding from the Corporation for Public Broadcasting; WUCF's TV financial report to the corporation that year indicated that the station had $6.9 million of total revenue, of which $1 million was in CPB grants.

== Technical information ==
=== Subchannels ===
WUCF-TV and WTGL transmit using WUCF-TV's spectrum from an antenna near Bithlo. The stations' signals are multiplexed:

Subchannels of WUCF-TV and WTGL
License	Subchannel	Res.	Short name	Programming
WUCF-TV	24.1	1080i	WUCF-HD	PBS
WUCF-TV	24.2	480i	Create	Create
WUCF-TV	24.3	480i	Kids	PBS Kids
WUCF-TV	24.4	480i	NHK	NHK World-Japan
WUCF-TV	24.5	480i	FL CH	The Florida Channel
WTGL	45.1	720p	WTGL-DT	Main WTGL programming

=== Analog-to-digital conversion ===
WMFE-TV shut down its analog signal, over UHF channel 24, on February 17, 2009, the original target digital television transition date. The station's digital signal continued to broadcasts on its pre-transition UHF channel 23, using virtual channel 24.

On March 9, 2018, WUCF-TV began to host WTGL under a channel sharing agreement after WTGL's sale of its spectrum in the 2016 United States wireless spectrum auction. WUCF–WTGL was repacked from channel 23 to channel 34 in January 2020.
