= WUCF-FM =

- Orlando, Florida; United States
- Broadcast area: Central Florida
- Frequency: 89.9 MHz (HD Radio)
- Branding: WUCF 89.9 FM

Programming
- Format: Public radio; college radio; jazz
- Subchannels: HD2: Latin jazz; HD3: BEACON
- Affiliations: National Public Radio; Public Radio Exchange

Ownership
- Owner: University of Central Florida; (University of Central Florida Board of Trustees)
- Sister stations: WUCF-TV

History
- First air date: January 30, 1978
- Former call signs: WFTU-FM (1978–1979)
- Call sign meaning: University of Central Florida

Technical information
- Licensing authority: FCC
- Facility ID: 69229
- Class: C3
- ERP: 360 watts horizontial; 5,600 watts vertical
- HAAT: 145 meters (476 ft)
- Transmitter coordinates: 28.591°N 81.2050°W

Links
- Public license information: Public file; LMS
- Webcast: Listen live
- Website: wucf.org

WUCF-FM (89.9 MHz) is a listener-supported radio station of the University of Central Florida in Orlando, Florida, United States. The station is one of Central Florida's two NPR member stations, along with WMFE-FM.

WUCF-FM is co-owned and operated by the University of Central Florida.

== Programming ==
The station broadcasts a 24-hour schedule of jazz and blues music along with news from NPR at the top of each hour.

In addition to its own line-up of jazz programming blocks, the station airs syndicated jazz music programming from National Public Radio and other distributors including Jazz Inspired, Jazz Profiles, JazzWorks and Jazz Night In America. The station also airs reruns of news programs Metro Center Outlook and Global Perspectives from its sister channel WUCF-TV. Since 2002, WUCF has hosted the syndicated blues rock program Smokestack Lightnin'.

== See also ==
- List of jazz radio stations in the United States
