= Bud Hedinger =

American talk radio host (born 1947)

- Born: January 23, 1947 (age 78); Glen Rock, New Jersey, U.S.
- Occupation(s): Talk radio host, television news anchor and personality
- Years active: 1969-present
- Website: www.budhedinger.com

John Harris Brady "Bud" Hedinger III (born January 23, 1947) is an American talk radio host in the Orlando, Florida area on station WFLA AM 540 (WFLF).

== Biography ==
Born in Glen Rock, New Jersey, he was nicknamed "Bud" by his mother the day he was born.

A graduate of Glen Rock High School, he received a bachelor's degree from Colgate University and a master's degree from Syracuse University. During his time at Colgate Hedinger was a member and assistant leader of the Colgate Thirteen, America's most widely heard and second oldest collegiate a cappella group.

From 1969 until 1986, Hedinger was a television personality in Syracuse, New York, first at WSYR-TV (Channel 3) as lead weatherman and host of Bowling for Dollars and later as weathercaster and news anchor at WIXT (Channel 9) beginning in 1978. He worked at WFTV Channel 9, the ABC television affiliate in Orlando from 1986 until 1989. Hedinger then spent time as an anchor for WTVF NewsChannel 5, the CBS affiliate in Nashville, before returning to Orlando in 1993. He then worked as an anchor at the Orlando affiliate of The CW television network, WKCF Channel 18, for the 10 o'clock news prior to moving on to radio for iHeartMedia's WFLA 102.5FM and WFLA 540AM Orlando simulcast. He retired on November 10, 2023.
