= Tom Terry (meteorologist) =

American meteorologist

- Born: March 30, 1969 (age 57); Fresno, California, U.S.
- Occupation: Television Meteorologist

Tom Terry (born March 30, 1969) is an American television meteorologist. He grew to prominence during his television coverage and forecasting of Hurricane Charley's path through Orlando in 2004. Terry had recognized and forecast the storm's track three hours before the NHC.

== Personal life ==
Terry is married and the father of two children.
