= The Florida Channel =

Florida government-access TV network

- Country: United States
- Broadcast area: Florida

Programming
- Language: English

Ownership
- Owner: Florida State University; Florida Legislature

Links
- Website: thefloridachannel.org

The Florida Channel is a government-access television network operated by Florida State University's WFSU-TV and the Florida State Legislature. The channel is currently carried by 46 cable TV systems throughout the State of Florida either on a part-time or full-time basis as well as through up to 18 live Internet streams and via satellite. The station operates 24 hours a day though its normal broadcast schedule starts at 6:00 a.m. ET and ends at 6:00 p.m. ET, with the day's programming repeated in a loop throughout the night. The Florida Channel also airs on the digital subchannels of most Florida PBS member stations and on some public independent and local cable-only stations.

When the state legislature is in session, live gavel-to-gavel coverage of the Florida Senate and the Florida House of Representatives is carried until the end of legislative business and is then usually followed by Capitol Update at 5:30 p.m. ET, which provides comprehensive coverage of each day's most significant legislative events.

When the legislature is not in session, other live gavel-to-gavel programming is carried, including the Florida Supreme Court, the meeting of the governor and cabinet and the Florida Public Service Commission meetings. When there are no live gavel-to-gavel meetings, other local or statewide public affairs programming is carried out.

The Florida Channel's offices and studios are located on the 9th floor (Suite 901) of the Capitol Building on South Monroe Street in south-central Tallahassee.

== Current affiliates ==
The following is a list of current affiliates of the Florida Channel, which includes "over-the-air" and local and systemwide cable networks in addition to the live stream available on their website and using the Roku streaming device.

City of license	Station ID	Channel	Notes/air times (all times ET, except where noted)
Bartow	Polk County Government TV	Comcast 5 Frontier FiberOpic 20; Spectrum (except Poinciana) 644 / Poinciana 497	5:30pm to 7:30pm Monday – Friday
Boca Raton	City of Boca Raton TV	Comcast 20; U-verse 99	6:00am to 12:00pm Monday – Friday; 12:00pm to 8:00pm Saturday & Sunday
Bunnell	Flagler County TV	Spectrum 492	12:00am to 8:00am Monday – Friday (preempted by local commission meetings)
Cocoa/Orlando	WEFS	68.4	Programming available 24 hours a day
Crestview	Okaloosa County School District TV	ITV Wireless Cable 6	Programming available 24 hours a day (Internal ITV Network)
Daytona Beach	WDSC-TV	15.2	Programing available 24 hours a day
Fort Myers	WGCU	30.4	Programming available 24 hours a day
Fort Myers	Lee TV	Comcast 97	3:00am to 8:00am Monday – Friday; 6:00pm to 7:00pm Monday – Saturday
Fort Pierce	St. Lucie County Television	U-verse 99	6:00am to 6:00pm Monday – Sunday (preempted for local government programming)
Fort Walton Beach	Fort Walton Beach TV	Cox 98	Programming available 24 hours a day (unless preempted by Commission meetings)
Gainesville	WUFT	5.3	Programming available from 8am to 6pm Monday – Friday
Jacksonville	WJCT	7.4	Programming available from 6am to 6pm Monday – Friday
Leesburg	Lake Sumter TV	Comcast 13; Prism 83; Spectrum 498	6:00am to 8:00pm (unless preempted by local programming)
Miami	WPBT	2.2	Carriage when the Florida Legislature is in session only (first Monday in March until adjourned)
Miami	Miami-Dade College TV	Comcast (Miami-Dade County); Comcast (Homestead) 21; Atlantic Broadband 78; KG Comm. 21	11:00pm to 8:00am Monday – Friday (daily during legislature session)
Miami	Miami-Dade County TV	Comcast 76; Atlantic Broadband 76; U-Verse 99	Check MDC-TV schedule for TFC programming schedule
Orlando	Orange TV	Comcast 9 Spectrum 488; U-verse 99	Programming available during legislative session only
Pensacola	WSRE	23.1	Programming available from 12:00am to 6:00am (Central Time) Monday - Sunday
Panama City	WFSG	56.2	Programming available starting at 10:30am (outside of legislature session); Programming available starting at 5:30pm Monday – Friday (during legislature session); Programming available starting at 11:00pm Monday – Friday (during legislature session)
Panama City	Escambia Government TV	Cox Cable 98; Spectrum 98; U-verse 99	12:00am to 7:00am (Central Time) Monday – Sunday
Port Charlotte	Charlotte County Government Access	Comcast 20 & 97	12:00am to 7am Monday – Sunday
Tallahassee	WFSU	11.2	Flagship station, programming available 24 hours a day
Tallahassee	4FSU (Florida State University Educational)	Comcast 4	12:00am to 6:00am Monday – Sunday
Tallahassee	School District of Lee County TV	Comcast 23	1:00am to 5:00am Monday – Sunday (subject to preemption)
Tampa	WEDU	3.3	Programming available 24 hours a day
Tampa	Hillsborough County Television	Comcast 22; Frontier FiOS 22; Spectrum 637	12:00am to 7:00am Monday – Friday; 12:00am to 6:30am Saturday & Sunday
Titusville	City of Titusville Government TV	Spectrum 498	6:00am to 7:30am Monday – Sunday (preempted by City Commission meetings)
Viera	Space Coast Government	Comcast 13 & 51; Spectrum 499	6:00am to 8:00pm Monday – Friday (preempted for local programming)
West Palm Beach	WXEL	42.3	Programming available 6:00am to 6:00pm Monday – Friday
West Palm Beach	Palm Beach County TV	Comcast 20	12:00am to 7:00am Monday – Sunday

== Controversy ==
In June 2011, it was revealed that the Florida Channel would receive $1.8 million for continued operation of the network, as part of the $2.8 million in funding that WFSU would receive. This was despite the $4.8 million of funding to other public radio and television stations vetoed by Governor Rick Scott in May 2011.
