= Bithlo, Florida =

Unincorporated area in Florida, US

- Census-designated place (CDP) & Unincorporated community
- Location in Orange County and the state of Florida
- Coordinates: 28°33′39″N 81°07′18″W
- Country: United States
- State: Florida
- County: Orange
- Incorporated (town): 1922
- Unincorporated: 1977

Area
  - Total: 11.08 sq mi (28.70 km^{2})
  - Land: 10.89 sq mi (28.21 km^{2})
  - Water: 0.19 sq mi (0.49 km^{2})
- Elevation: 69 ft (21 m)

Population (2020)
  - Total: 9,848
  - Density: 904.0/sq mi (349.04/km^{2})
- Time zone: UTC-5 (Eastern (EST))
  - Summer (DST): UTC-4 (EDT)
- FIPS code: 12-06625
- GNIS feature ID: 2402690

Bithlo is a census-designated place and an unincorporated community in Orange County, Florida, United States. As of the 2020 census, Bithlo had a population of 9,848. It is part of the Orlando–Kissimmee Metropolitan Statistical Area.

The Bithlo Post Office opened in 1922. For 20 years in the early 20th century, Bithlo was an incorporated town, but in 1929 ceased to function as a town due to economic hardship. By 1941, the town council meetings had ended and in 1944 the Okeechobee Railroad Branch was abandoned. After the end of World War II, the town became known as a waste dump and pollution site. It was in 1970 when the residents of Bithlo petitioned the state legislature to revoke the town's charter. The city was finally unincorporated in 1977, an act which was not finalized until 1982 due to outstanding bonds and legal problems.

Bithlo is the location of several of the broadcasting towers for the digital television stations in the Orlando-Daytona Beach-Melbourne market. It is also home to Bithlo Park and the East Orange Babe Ruth youth baseball and softball program, one of the premier youth baseball and softball programs in Central Florida.

== Geography ==
According to the United States Census Bureau, the CDP has a total area of 28.2 km^{2} (10.9 sq mi). 27.6 km^{2} (10.7 sq mi) of it is land and 0.5 km^{2} (0.19 sq mi) of it (1.84%) is water.

== Name origin ==
"Bithlo" derives from the Muskogee word pilo ("canoe"). The ⟨l⟩ represents a lateral fricative /ɬ/ which was often transcribed ⟨thl⟩. The unaspirated /p/ of Muskogee is acoustically as similar to English voiced and unaspirated /b/ as to English voiceless and aspirated /pʰ/.

== Demographics ==
Historical population
Year	Pop.	±%
1930	128	—
1935	86	−32.8%
1940	79	−8.1%
1950	50	−36.7%
1960	168	+236.0%
1970	864	+414.3%
1980	1,077	+24.7%
1990	2,288	+112.4%
2000	4,626	+102.2%
2010	8,268	+78.7%
2020	9,848	+19.1%
U.S. Decennial Census; Source:

=== 2020 census ===
As of the 2020 census, Bithlo had a population of 9,848. The median age was 39.4 years. 23.8% of residents were under the age of 18 and 12.4% of residents were 65 years of age or older. For every 100 females there were 100.5 males, and for every 100 females age 18 and over there were 101.5 males age 18 and over.

78.4% of residents lived in urban areas, while 21.6% lived in rural areas.

There were 3,297 households in Bithlo, of which 36.6% had children under the age of 18 living in them. Of all households, 53.7% were married-couple households, 17.9% were households with a male householder and no spouse or partner present, and 20.2% were households with a female householder and no spouse or partner present. About 17.6% of all households were made up of individuals and 5.8% had someone living alone who was 65 years of age or older.

There were 3,486 housing units, of which 5.4% were vacant. The homeowner vacancy rate was 1.4% and the rental vacancy rate was 6.1%.

Racial composition as of the 2020 census
Race	Number	Percent
White	5,727	58.2%
Black or African American	943	9.6%
American Indian and Alaska Native	46	0.5%
Asian	544	5.5%
Native Hawaiian and Other Pacific Islander	8	0.1%
Some other race	828	8.4%
Two or more races	1,752	17.8%
Hispanic or Latino (of any race)	2,856	29.0%

=== 2000 census ===
As of the census of 2000, there were 4,626 people, 1,651 households, and 1,177 families residing in the CDP. The population density was 167.4 people/km^{2} (434 people/mi^{2}). There were 1,829 housing units at an average density of 66.2 units/km^{2} (171 units/mi^{2}). The racial makeup of the CDP was 93.36% White, 0.99% African American, 0.91% Native American, 0.35% Asian, 0.04% Pacific Islander, 2.14% from other races, and 2.20% from two or more races. Hispanic or Latino of any race were 9.32% of the population.

There were 1,651 households, out of which 35.8% had children under the age of 18 living with them, 48.5% were married couples living together, 13.6% had a female householder with no husband present, and 28.7% were non-families. 19.0% of all households were made up of individuals, and 5.0% had someone living alone who was 65 years of age or older. The average household size was 2.80 and the average family size was 3.16.

In the CDP, the population was spread out, with 27.9% under the age of 18, 9.9% from 18 to 24, 30.9% from 25 to 44, 22.9% from 45 to 64, and 8.4% who were 65 years of age or older. The median age was 34 years. For every 100 females, there were 106.7 males. For every 100 females age 18 and over, there were 107.3 males.

The median income for a household in the CDP was $34,530, and the median income for a family was $34,425. Males had a median income of $27,894 versus $17,250 for females. The per capita income for the CDP was $13,867. About 16.9% of families and 21.5% of the population were below the poverty line, including 28.6% of those under age 18 and 9.2% of those age 65 or over.
