= Channel 5 low-power TV stations in the United States =

The following low-power television stations broadcast on digital or analog channel 5 in the United States:

- K05AF-D in Mina/Luning, Nevada
- K05AH-D in Hot Springs, Montana
- K05AR-D in Rockville, Utah
- K05BE-D in Lehmi, etc., Idaho
- K05BU-D in Enterprise, Utah
- K05CF-D in Weaverville, California
- K05CR-D in Hayfork, California
- K05DQ-D in Burney, etc., California
- K05EM-D in Paradise, California
- K05EY-D in Terrace Lakes, Idaho
- K05FC-D in Lake McDonald, Montana
- K05FW-D in Girdwood, Alaska
- K05GA-D in Dolores, Colorado
- K05GJ-D in Thayne, etc., Wyoming
- K05GL-D in Coolin, Idaho
- K05GM-D in Plains-Paradise, Montana
- K05GQ-D in Kooskia, Idaho
- K05IZ-D in Hinsdale, Montana
- K05JU-D in Elko, Nevada
- K05JW-D in Ismay Canyon, Colorado
- K05KK-D in Poplar, Montana
- K05LI-D in Weber Canyon, Colorado
- K05ML-D in Sula, Montana
- K05MN-D in Logan, Utah
- K05MR-D in Bullhead City, Arizona
- K05MU-D in Leavenworth, Washington
- K05MW-D in Ferndale, Montana
- K05MX-D in Nephi, Utah
- K05ND-D in Long Valley Junction, Utah
- K05NE-D in Polson, Montana
- K05NF-D in Salina, Utah
- K05NG-D in Cedar Canyon, Utah
- K05NL-D in Reno, Nevada
- KAMK-LD in Eugene, Oregon
- KEVC-CD in Indio, California
- KPFW-LD in Dallas, Texas
- KQRY-LD in Fort Smith, Arkansas
- KRDH-LD in Cripple Creek, etc., Colorado
- KSCT-LP in Sitka, Alaska
- KTDJ-LD in Dayton, Texas
- KVHF-LD in Fresno, California
- KXDA-LD in Garland, Texas
- W05AA-D in Roanoke, Virginia
- W05AR-D in Bryson City, etc., North Carolina
- W05AW-D in Christiansted, U.S. Virgin Islands
- W05BV-D in Starkville, Mississippi
- W05CO-D in Sarasota, Florida
- W05CY-D in Mayaguez, Puerto Rico
- W05DA-D in Fajardo, Puerto Rico
- W05DB-D in Ponce, Puerto Rico
- W05DD-D in St. Francis, Maine
- WDGT-LD in Miami, Florida
- WDTO-LD in Orlando, Florida
- WEWF-LD in Jupiter, Florida
- WEXZ-LD in Bangor, Maine
- WFIB-LD in Key West, Florida
- WFIG-LD in Charlotte Amalie, U.S. Virgin Islands
- WFXZ-CD in Boston, Massachusetts, uses WGBH-TV's full-power spectrum
- WIVN-LD in Newcomerstown, Ohio
- WMBE-LD in Myrtle Beach, South Carolina
- WRUF-LD in Gainesville, Florida
- WTNB-CD in Cleveland, Tennessee
- WTVF (DRT) in Nashville, Tennessee
- WXNJ-LD in Wanaque, New Jersey

The following low-power stations, which are no longer licensed, formerly broadcast on digital or analog channel 5:

- K05BK in Green River, Utah
- K05BR in Dunsmuir, etc., California
- K05CJ in Challis, Idaho
- K05DC in Cambridge, etc., Idaho
- K05DF in Mapleton, Oregon
- K05DS in St. Regis, Montana
- K05DV in Escalante, Utah
- K05EF in Brady, etc., Texas
- K05EK in Mazama, Washington
- K05EQ in Green Point, etc., California
- K05ET-D in Likely, California
- K05FG in McCall, etc., Idaho
- K05FI in Delta Junction, Alaska
- K05FJ in Manila, etc., Utah
- K05FO in Ridgecrest, etc., California
- K05FR-D in Crowley Lake, California
- K05GC in Rexford/Fortine, Montana
- K05GD in Smith, etc., Nevada
- K05GX in East Price, Utah
- K05GY in New Castle, etc., Colorado
- K05GZ in Black Butte Ranch, Oregon
- K05HA in Glennallen, etc., Alaska
- K05HB in Cedar City, Utah
- K05HE in Glenwood Springs, Colorado
- K05IJ in Eagle Village, Alaska
- K05JK in Mineral, California
- K05JN in Montezuma Creek-Aneth, Utah
- K05JS in Ticaboo, Utah
- K05JT in Pitkin, Colorado
- K05JV in La Pine, Oregon
- K05KF in Dillingham, Alaska
- K05KX in Tillamook, Oregon
- K05KY in Lincoln City, Oregon
- K05LE in Astoria, Oregon
- K05LP in Ryndon, Nevada
- K05LU in Jefferson City, Missouri
- K05LY in Moberly, Missouri
- K05MY-D in Bakersfield, California
- KCEM-LD in Chelan Butte, Washington
- KDSI-LP in Carthage, Missouri
- KHHB-LP in Hilo, Hawaii
- KRCW-LP in Portland, Oregon
- W05AE in Sylva, etc., North Carolina
- W05AF in Cherokee, North Carolina
- W05AO in Pickens, South Carolina
- W05AP in Brasstown, etc., North Carolina
- WNYX-LD in New York, New York
