= Channel 5 digital TV stations in the United States =

The following television stations broadcast on digital channel 5 in the United States:

- K05AF-D in Mina/Luning, Nevada, on virtual channel 8, which rebroadcasts KOLO-TV
- K05AH-D in Hot Springs, Montana, on virtual channel 13, which rebroadcasts KECI-TV
- K05AR-D in Rockville, Utah, on virtual channel 5, which rebroadcasts KSL-TV
- K05BE-D in Lehmi, etc., Idaho, on virtual channel 8, which rebroadcasts KPAX-TV
- K05BU-D in Enterprise, Utah, on virtual channel 4, which rebroadcasts KTVX
- K05CF-D in Weaverville, California, on virtual channel 7, which rebroadcasts KRCR-TV
- K05CR-D in Hayfork, California, on virtual channel 9, which rebroadcasts KIXE-TV
- K05DQ-D in Burney, etc., California, on virtual channel 7, which rebroadcasts KRCR-TV
- K05EM-D in Paradise, California
- K05EY-D in Terrace Lakes, Idaho, on virtual channel 2, which rebroadcasts KBOI-TV
- K05FC-D in Lake McDonald, Montana, on virtual channel 9, which rebroadcasts KCFW-TV
- K05FW-D in Girdwood, Alaska, on virtual channel 7, which rebroadcasts KAKM
- K05GA-D in Dolores, Colorado, on virtual channel 5
- K05GJ-D in Thayne, etc., Wyoming, on virtual channel 3, which rebroadcasts KIDK
- K05GL-D in Coolin, Idaho, on virtual channel 7, which rebroadcasts KSPS-TV
- K05GM-D in Plains-Paradise, Montana, on virtual channel 8, which rebroadcasts KPAX-TV
- K05GQ-D in Kooskia, Idaho, on virtual channel 12, which rebroadcasts KUID-TV
- K05IZ-D in Hinsdale, Montana, on virtual channel 18, which rebroadcasts K18BN-D
- K05JU-D in Elko, Nevada, on virtual channel 14, which rebroadcasts KJZZ-TV
- K05JW-D in Ismay Canyon, Colorado, on virtual channel 5
- K05KK-D in Poplar, Montana, on virtual channel 5, which rebroadcasts KXGN-TV
- K05LI-D in Weber Canyon, Colorado, on virtual channel 17, which rebroadcasts K17JJ-D
- K05ML-D in Sula, Montana, on virtual channel 13, which rebroadcasts KECI-TV
- K05MN-D in Logan, Utah, on virtual channel 38
- K05MR-D in Bullhead City, Arizona, on virtual channel 5, which rebroadcasts KPHO-TV
- K05MU-D in Leavenworth, Washington, on virtual channel 4, which rebroadcasts KXLY-TV
- K05MW-D in Ferndale, Montana, on virtual channel 34, which rebroadcasts KMJD-LD
- K05MX-D in Nephi, Utah
- K05ND-D in Long Valley Junction, Utah, on virtual channel 8, which rebroadcasts KTTA-LD
- K05NE-D in Polson, Montana, on virtual channel 28, which rebroadcasts KAYU-TV
- K05NF-D in Salina, Utah, on virtual channel 30, which rebroadcasts KUCW
- K05NG-D in Cedar Canyon, Utah, on virtual channel 2, which rebroadcasts KUTV
- K05NL-D in Reno, Nevada
- KAMK-LD in Eugene, Oregon, on virtual channel 36, which rebroadcasts KTVC
- KCWX in Fredericksburg, Texas, on virtual channel 2, which will move to channel 8
- KHSD-TV in Lead, South Dakota, on virtual channel 11
- KNHL in Hastings, Nebraska, on virtual channel 5
- KOBI in Medford, Oregon, on virtual channel 5
- KPFW-LD in Dallas, Texas, on virtual channel 18
- KQRY-LD in Fort Smith, Arkansas, on virtual channel 36, which rebroadcasts KFFS-CD
- KRCB in Cotati, California, on virtual channel 22
- KRDH-LD in Cripple Creek, etc., Colorado, on virtual channel 5
- KSCP-LP in Sitka, Alaska, on virtual channel 5, which rebroadcasts KUBD
- KTDJ-LD in Dayton, Texas, on virtual channel 5
- KVCR-DT in San Bernardino, California, on virtual channel 24
- KVHF-LD in Fresno, California, on virtual channel 4
- KXDA-LD in Garland, Texas, on virtual channel 41
- KXGN-TV in Glendive, Montana, on virtual channel 5
- KXLF-TV in Butte, Montana, on virtual channel 4
- W05AA-D in Roanoke, Virginia, on virtual channel 13, which rebroadcasts WSET-TV
- W05AR-D in Bryson City, etc., North Carolina, on virtual channel 4, which rebroadcasts WYFF
- W05AW-D in Christiansted, U.S. Virgin Islands, on virtual channel 12, which rebroadcasts WTJX-TV
- W05BV-D in Starkville, Mississippi, on virtual channel 5
- W05CO-D in Sarasota, Florida
- W05CY-D in Mayaguez, Puerto Rico, on virtual channel 5
- W05DA-D in Fajardo, Puerto Rico, on virtual channel 5, which rebroadcasts WORA-TV
- W05DB-D in Ponce, Puerto Rico, on virtual channel 5, which rebroadcasts WORA-TV
- W05DD-D in St. Francis, Maine, on virtual channel 10, which rebroadcasts WMEM-TV
- WBKP in Calumet, Michigan, on virtual channel 5
- WDGT-LD in Miami, Florida, on virtual channel 24
- WDTO-LD in Orlando, Florida, on virtual channel 5
- WEWF-LD in Jupiter, Florida
- WEXZ-LD in Bangor, Maine, on virtual channel 13
- WFIG-LD in Charlotte Amalie, U.S. Virgin Islands, on virtual channel 8, which rebroadcasts WSVI
- WFXZ-CD in Boston, Massachusetts, which shares WGBH-TV's spectrum, on virtual channel 24
- WGBH-TV in Boston, Massachusetts, on virtual channel 2
- WGVK in Kalamazoo, Michigan, on virtual channel 52
- WIVN-LD in Newcomerstown, Ohio, on virtual channel 29, which rebroadcasts WIVM-LD
- WIWN in Fond du Lac, Wisconsin, on virtual channel 68
- WJSP-TV in Columbus, Georgia, on virtual channel 28
- WLMB in Toledo, Ohio, on virtual channel 40, which will move to channel 35
- WMBE-LD in Myrtle Beach, South Carolina
- WMC-TV in Memphis, Tennessee, on virtual channel 5
- WMDE in Dover, Delaware, on virtual channel 36
- WNYB in Jamestown, New York, on virtual channel 26
- WOI-DT in Ames, Iowa, on virtual channel 5
- WRUF-LD in Gainesville, Florida, on virtual channel 10
- WTNB-CD in Cleveland, Tennessee, on virtual channel 27
- WTVF (DRT) in Nashville, Tennessee, on virtual channel 5
- WXNJ-LD in West Orange, New Jersey, on virtual channel 22

The following stations, which are no longer licensed, formerly broadcast on digital channel 5:

- K05ET-D in Likely, California
- K05FR-D in Crowley Lake, California
- K05MC-D in Billings, Montana
- K05MI-D in Lakeport, California
- K05MY-D in Bakersfield, California
- KCEM-LD in Chelan Butte, Washington
- KIDA in Sun Valley, Idaho, on virtual channel 5
- KRCW-LP in Portland, Oregon
- W05CS-D in Port Jervis, New York
- WBDI-LD in Springfield, Illinois
- WNYX-LD in New York, New York
