= WRUF =

WRUF may refer to:

- WRUF (AM), a radio station (850 AM) licensed to Gainesville, Florida, United States
- WRUF-FM, a radio station (103.7 FM) licensed to Gainesville, Florida, United States
- WRUF-LD, a low-power television station (channel 5/PSIP 10) licensed to Gainesville, Florida, United States
