= List of television stations in the U.S. Virgin Islands =

This is a list of broadcast television stations that are licensed in the U.S. Virgin Islands. The U.S. Virgin Islands is home to one of the smallest TV markets as defined by Nielsen market research, with only five full-power stations on Saint Thomas and Saint Croix.

== Full-power ==
- Stations are arranged by media market served and channel position.

Full-power television stations in the U.S. Virgin Islands
Media market	Station	Channel	Primary affiliation(s)	Notes	Refs
Saint Croix	WSVI	8	Independent with Ion	(Note: Licensed to Christiansted, U.S. Virgin Islands.)	
Saint Croix	WCVI-TV	23	CBS, ABC on 23.2		
Saint Thomas	WTJX-TV	12	PBS	(Note: Licensed to Charlotte Amalie, U.S. Virgin Islands.)	
Saint Thomas	WVXF	17	Cozi TV, Fox on 17.2		

== Low-power ==
Low-power television stations in the U.S. Virgin Islands
Media market	Station	Channel	Primary affiliation(s)	Notes	Refs
Saint Thomas	WVGN-LD	19	NBC		
Saint Thomas	W31EJ-D	33	[Blank]	(Note: Licensed to Tutu, U.S. Virgin Islands.)	

== Translators ==
Television station translators in the U.S. Virgin Islands
Media market	Station	Channel	Translating	Notes	Refs
Saint Croix	W05AW-D	12	WTJX-TV		
Saint Croix	W18EN-D	68	WVSN	(Note: Licensed to Sion Farm, St Croix.)	
Saint Thomas	WFIG-LD	8	WSVI		
Saint Thomas	WZVI	21	WSVI		

== Defunct ==
- WBNB-TV Charlotte Amalie, St. Thomas (1961–1989)
- WVIF Christiansted, St. Croix (1999–2009)
