= WTJX =

WTJX may refer to:

- WTJX-FM, a radio station (93.1 FM) licensed to serve Charlotte Amalie, U.S. Virgin Islands
- WTJX-TV, a television station (channel 36, virtual 12) licensed to serve Charlotte Amalie
