= Kristina Pink =

American sports reporter

Kristina Pink is a sports reporter for Fox Sports for their NFL coverage and a sideline reporter for Prime Video for their NBA coverage.

== Early life and college ==
Pink was born in Miami, Florida and graduated from a high school in Pembroke Pines, Florida. She went to the University of Florida where she contributed as a sportscaster for the university’s television station, WUFT (TV) as well as its radio station, WRUF-AM 850. She covered the Gators' Women's Basketball and Softball teams. She graduated in December 2007 with a Bachelor’s degree in telecommunications.

== Career ==
She began her professional career in 2008 as a sports anchor/reporter at WDBD-TV in Jackson, Mississippi. Pink would go to work as a sports reporter for WGNO-TV an ABC affiliate in New Orleans, Louisiana and WTVJ-TV, an NBC affiliate in Miami, Florida before working at Fox Sports in 2012. She also covered College Football for Fox Sports for the 2013 and 2014 seasons. Shortly after moving to Los Angeles, California, she was added to cover the Los Angeles Clippers. From 2018 to 2021, Pink was one of two in-game NFL reporters on Thursday Night Football alongside Erin Andrews, play-by-play announcer Joe Buck and analyst Troy Aikman. On January 8, 2022, Pink served as the Clippers lead color analyst after Jim Jackson and Mike Fratello were unavailable. One day later she slipped and fell face first after an on-court, post-game interview with Clippers guard Amir Coffey. Coffey's teammates had moments before doused him with water as Pink interviewed him. Fortunately she was not hurt. She reported for the Los Angeles Clippers along with Jaime Maggio on FanDuel Sports Network West. In 2025, she left the Clippers to join Prime Video for their NBA coverage as a sideline reporter, starting in October after winning a rights package that previously was held by TNT Sports.
