= WOGK =

Radio station in Ocala, Florida

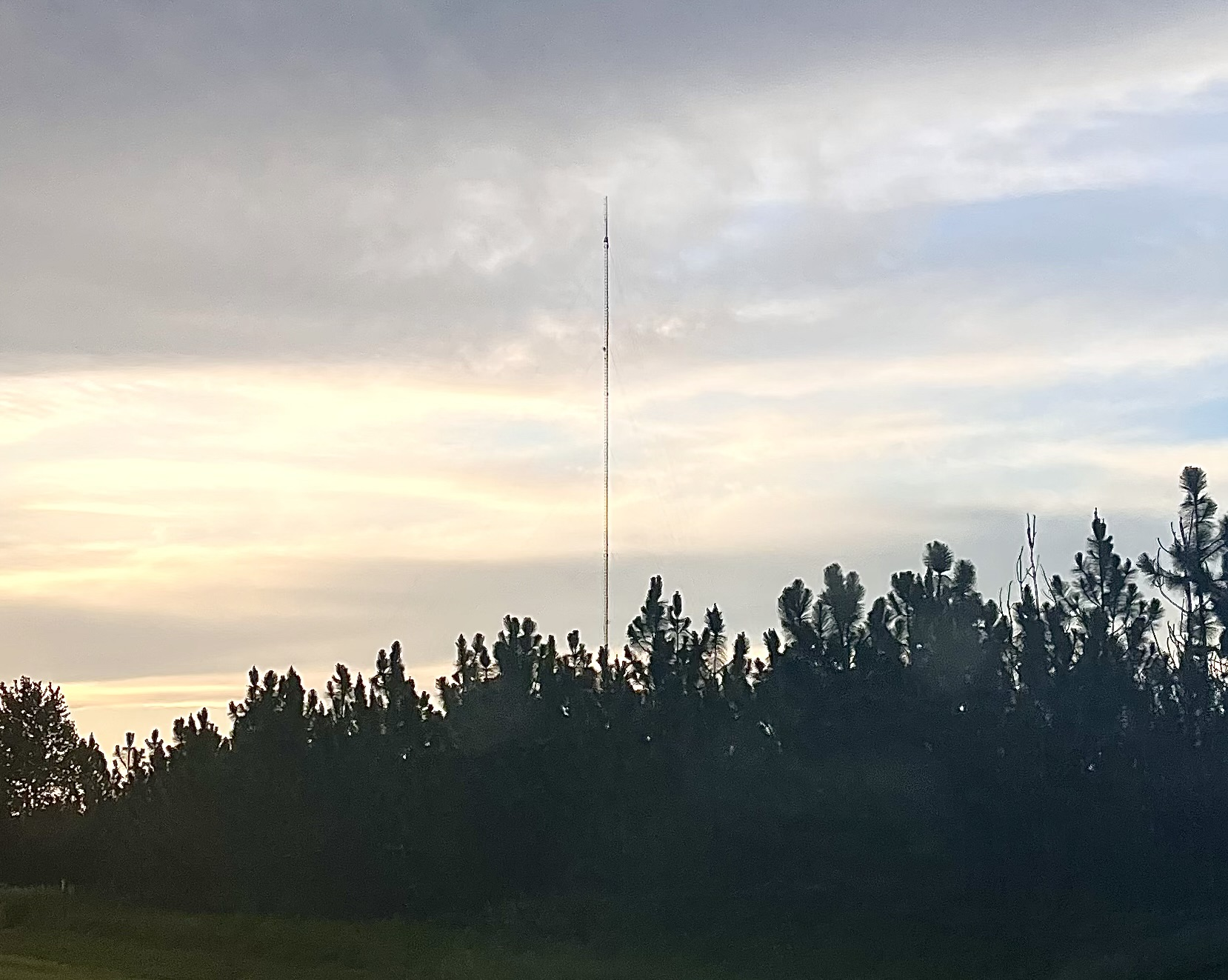
- WOGK transmitter
- Ocala, Florida; United States
- Broadcast area: Gainesville metropolitan area
- Frequency: 93.7 MHz (HD Radio)
- Branding: 93.7 K-Country

Programming
- Format: Country
- Subchannels: HD2: Classic country "93.7 HD2 The Outlaw"

Ownership
- Owner: Saga Communications; (Saga South Communications, LLC)
- Sister stations: WNDD; WYND-FM

History
- First air date: November 7, 1960 (as WMOP-FM)
- Former call signs: WMOP-FM (1960–1973); WFUZ (1973–1986); WMMZ (1986–1994)
- Call sign meaning: Ocala and Gainesville's K-Country

Technical information
- Licensing authority: FCC
- Facility ID: 49962
- Class: C0
- ERP: 100,000 watts
- HAAT: 411 meters (1,348 ft)
- Transmitter coordinates: 29.268°N 82.081°W

Links
- Public license information: Public file; LMS
- Webcast: Listen live
- Website: www.937kcountry.com; HD2: 937hd2theoutlaw.com

WOGK (93.7 FM), known as "K-Country", is a commercial radio station in Ocala, Florida, broadcasting to the Gainesville radio market. It is owned by Saga Communications, and it airs a country music format. The studios and offices are on East Fort King Street in Ocala.

WOGK is a Class C0 FM station. It has an effective radiated power (ERP) of 100,000 watts, the maximum for most FM stations. The transmitter and tower are off NE 79th Street in Anthony, Florida. With a good radio, the signal can be heard as far as Daytona Beach, Orlando, and Jacksonville. WOGK broadcasts using HD Radio technology. Its HD2 subchannel, known as "The Outlaw," carries a classic country format.

== History ==
=== Easy listening, AC and Top 40 ===
The station signed on the air on November 7, 1960. The original call sign was WMOP-FM. It was the sister station to WMOP (900 AM). WMOP-FM was powered at 4,200 watts, a fraction of its current output, and it largely simulcast its AM counterpart. WMOP-AM-FM played middle of the road (MOR) music with some news and sports.

Owner James Kirk instituted major changes in 1973, separating the programming. The FM station's call letters changed to WFUZ, and the effective radiated power was boosted to 100,000 watts, allowing it to cover both Ocala and Gainesville, plus other Central Florida communities. WFUZ installed a beautiful music/easy listening format. There were also specialty big band shows hosted by the legendary disc jockey "Big Daddy" Miles Foland. WFUZ eventually added evening country music programming in the early 1980s, in response to the growing popularity of competitor WTRS-FM.

In 1985, the station dumped the evening country programming and converted WFUZ to a full-time adult contemporary format. Then, in July 1986, James Kirk sold WFUZ to Dix Communications with David Dix serving as president. The station's format switched to CHR/Top 40 as WMMZ ("Z93"). That put the station in competition with top-rated WYKS "Kiss 105."

=== Country music ===
After a successful eight-year run as "Z93", 93.7 FM decided to make a big change. In 1994, the station flipped to country music and switched its call sign to WOGK. WOGK became the market's most-listened-to radio station and usually beats its country rivals WRUF-FM and WXUS in the Nielsen ratings.

On October 30, 2018, it was announced that Dix Communications would sell WOGK, WNDD, WNDN and WDNT to Saga Communications for $9.3 million.
