= WUFT =

WUFT may refer to:

- WUFT (TV), a television station (channel 5 virtual/36 digital) licensed to Gainesville, Florida, United States
- WUFT-FM, a radio station (89.1 FM) licensed to Gainesville, Florida, United States
