= WYKS =

Coordinates: 29.632°N 82.419°W

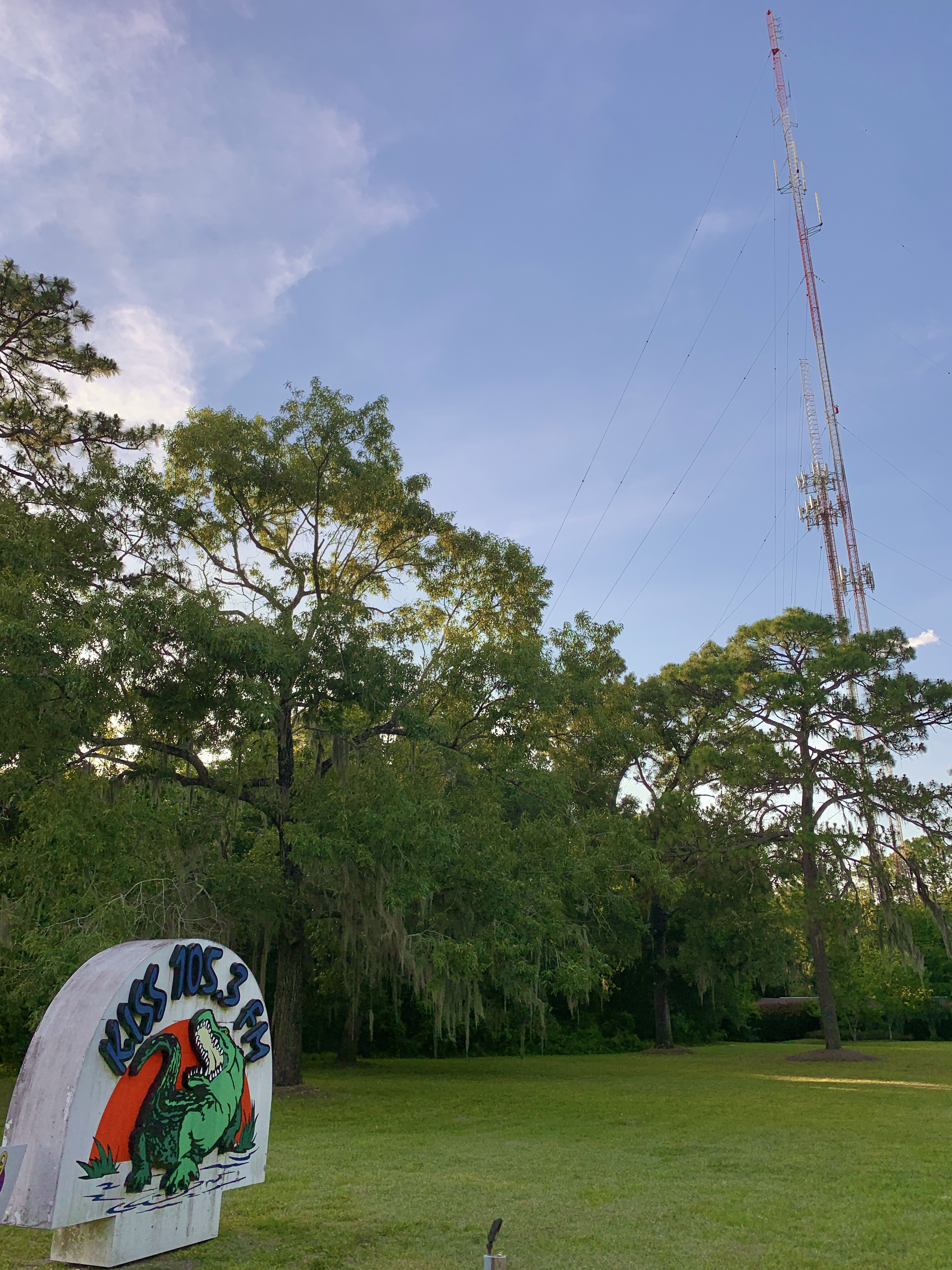
- Gainesville, Florida; United States
- Broadcast area: Gainesville-Ocala
- Frequency: 105.3 MHz
- Branding: Kiss 105.3

Programming
- Format: Contemporary hits

Ownership
- Owner: Gillen Broadcasting Corporation
- Sister stations: WAJD

History
- First air date: May 4, 1970
- Former call signs: WGVL (1970–1981)
- Former frequencies: 105.5 MHz (1970–1995)

Technical information
- Licensing authority: FCC
- Facility ID: 24208
- Class: A
- ERP: 3,000 watts
- HAAT: 142 meters (466 ft)

Links
- Public license information: Public file; LMS
- Webcast: Listen live
- Website: kiss1053.com

WYKS (105.3 FM, "Kiss 105.3") is a commercial radio station licensed to Gainesville, Florida, United States, serving the Gainesville-Ocala market. It is owned by the Gillen Broadcasting Corporation and airs a contemporary hits format.

The studios and transmitter are on SW 24th Avenue in Gainesville, near the Galen College of Nursing.

== History ==
The station signed on the air on May 4, 1970. It broadcast on 105.5 FM as WGVL. It began with an automated country music format but soon switching to album oriented rock. As an AOR outlet, WGVL was one of the most popular FM stations in Gainesville during the 1970s, often beating AM Top 40 stations WRUF 850 and WGGG 1230 in its target young male demographics.

After 103.7 WRUF-FM abruptly switched from beautiful music to AOR as "Rock 104" in 1981, WGVL decided to take a new tack. WRUF-FM is powered at 100,000 watts vs. 3,000 for WGVL and WGVL's management realized it would be hard for it to compete with WRUF-FM for rock fans. On December 25, 1981, "Kiss 105" was born with a Top 40/CHR format. The call sign switched to WYKS, the last two letters standing for "KISS-FM." Since it was Christmas Day, Kiss 105 debuted with Bob and Doug McKenzie's version of "The Twelve Days of Christmas." Now known as "Kiss 105.3", adding the decimal point, WYKS has remained one of the most popular radio stations in the market since.

The frequency changed from 105.5 to 105.3 in 1995. Although the station's effective radiated power (ERP) remained at 3,000 watts, there was a slight increase in tower height, which improved the station's coverage area.
