= WNDD =

WNDD may refer to:

- WNDD (FM), a radio station (92.5 FM) licensed to serve Alachua, Florida, United States
- WYND-FM, a radio station (95.5 FM) licensed to serve Silver Springs, Florida, which held the call sign WNDD from 1995 to 2019
- WNRX, a radio station (93.3 FM) licensed to serve Jefferson City, Tennessee, United States, which held the call sign WNDD from 1992 to 1994
