= James G. Howes =

American businessman (1945–2021)

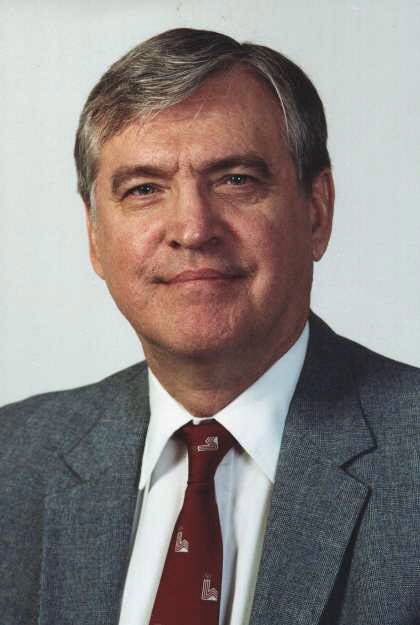
- Howes in 2003
- Born: November 14, 1945; Baltimore, Maryland, U.S.
- Died: September 14, 2021 (aged 75); Safety Harbor, Florida, U.S.
- Education: University of Maryland (BSc, MBA)
- Occupations: Businessman, radio presenter
- Military career
- Branch: United States Air Force
- Service years: 1969–1972
- Rank: Captain
- Units: Strategic Air Command, 351st Missile Wing
- Presenting career
- Stations: WBVM-FM, WBVM-HD2, and WUFQ
- Time slot: 6:00–8:00 p.m. ET Saturday; 6:00–8:00 a.m. ET Sunday; 7:00–9:00 p.m. PT Sunday; 10:00–11:59 p.m. ET Sunday
- Website: http://www.SacredClassics.com

James Guerdon Howes (November 14, 1945 – September 14, 2021) was an American businessman in the aviation and communications fields. He was best known as announcer and producer of the weekly Sacred Classics radio program, which originated on WBVM, in Tampa, Florida, and was live streamed on the internet. His company, Atlas Communications, based in Baltimore, Maryland, produced private label CDs of various choirs and organists appearing on the show. Howes was previously active as an aviation industry executive. He died at his home in Safety Harbor, Florida, on September 14, 2021.

== Early years ==
James G. Howes was born in Baltimore, Maryland, to James Harold and Edna Esther (Lowman) Howes on November 14, 1945. He is the grandson of radio evangelist Rev G. E. Lowman and related by marriage to Emmy Award-winning video editor Walter Balderson. His early childhood interest in broadcasting was sparked by watching the control room engineers producing his grandfather's worldwide radio broadcast in the 1950s. He also became interested in the transportation industry by watching the local Baltimore television program of the 1950s about the maritime shipping industry, The Port That Built A City, hosted by Helen Delich Bentley, and Arthur Godfrey's televised anecdotes about flying. After attending Towson High School, he graduated from the University of Maryland with a Bachelor of Science degree in transportation. In 1969, he earned a Master of Business Administration degree from the Robert H. Smith School of Business at the University of Maryland, College Park. While an undergraduate, Howes received an Air Force ROTC scholarship, going on active duty from 1969 to 1972 as a traffic management officer at Whiteman Air Force Base, Missouri. He was discharged as a captain. He served as an intern for United States Senator Joseph Tydings from 1965 to 1968.

== Career ==
After leaving the Air Force, Howes first worked for The Hertz Corporation as a Regional Manager of Marketing from 1972 to 1975 before he began working in airport management. His career has enabled him to meet several political leaders, including many recent American presidents and former British Prime Minister Margaret Thatcher. He also was a campaigner for the Republican National Committee in Washington, D.C., from 1974 to 1984.

=== Broadcasting ===
Howes' involvement in the communications business primarily focused on radio and music. He originally began producing both King of Instruments (1983–1985) and Choral Masterpieces (1985–1995), for the old WXCR radio station. Production moved to WBVM and in 1986 the choral and organ programs were combined into the program Sacred Classics. Sacred Classics was broadcast around the world. This led to the formation of Atlas Communications in 1991, which also produced CDs and concerts in addition to broadcasting programs, including [Sacred Classics. Howes was president of Atlas Communications since 2001. The final broadcast of Sacred Classics was recorded before Howes' death, and aired posthumously on September 26, 2021.

=== Aviation ===
Howes had a background in airport management as the Commissioner of Aviation, Poughkeepsie, New York (1975–1980), and then as executive director of the St. Petersburg-Clearwater International Airport in St. Petersburg, Florida (1980–2001), as well as working at Baltimore/Washington International Airport. When Howes was appointed director of St. Petersburg-Clearwater International Airport in 1980, the airport had less than 100,000 airline passengers annually. By 1993, passenger volume had increased to 721,977; beginning in 1995, it surpassed one million passengers yearly. In response to the growth, major improvements to the airport's terminal were completed in the 1990s. Howes also negotiated a 15-year lease with United Parcel Service in 1994 for its Florida air freight hub and expanded the airport's 2,000-acre (8.1 km^{2}) industrial park.

Howes' business-related awards include: the FAA Southern Region's Airport of Year Safety Award for 1998 and the Bermuda Hotel Association's "Man of the Year" for 2004. He was a member of the American Association of Airport Executives and the Southeastern (U.S.) Airport Managers' Association (president 1993–94). He was president of the Florida Airports Council (1989–1990) and was a director of the Tony Jannus Distinguished Aviation Society.

Howes took over Bermuda's L.F. Wade International Airport as General Manager in May, 2002, when the airport was struggling and handling only 98 flights a week. The air carriers' fares at the airport were expensive, having little competition, and most tourists were going to Caribbean destinations. Bermuda's Transport Minister at the time (and later Premier) Dr. Ewart Brown, wrote that the Ministry's objectives were the upgrading of airport facilities and increasing airline service, and Howes was "at the top of [the] short list" because of his success at St. Petersburg-Clearwater International Airport. Howes and the Bermuda Transport Ministry team developed a strategic plan to attract low-cost carriers and increase traffic. Arrivals soon increased over 15 percent—over 124 a week in the summer. While Howes was manager, passenger traffic steadily increased. In August 2006 it increased 20% over the previous August. Howes also improved access for handicapped passengers and obtained Doppler weather radar for the airport.

In 2002 and 2003, the Bermuda International Airport placed highly in the International Air Transport Association's survey of overall passenger satisfaction, winning its North American Region both years and rising from ninth to fourth worldwide. Bermuda Transport Minister Brown and Howes celebrated the 2002 result by throwing an "Airport Appreciation Day" party for all airport employees and their families. More than one thousand persons attending the beachfront event were given souvenir T-shirts and pins proclaiming "Bermuda Airport – #1 in Service", along with food and live entertainment. After the $35,000 cost for the event was criticized by the opposition political party and The Royal Gazette, Howes released a statement addressing the controversy, saying: "Astute management in any large organization realizes that there is far more to motivating employees in the pursuit of excellence than a paycheck alone".

There was an air traffic controller strike at the airport in September 2002 that had been brewing for two years. In December 2002 labor issues began with the airport firefighters, which erupted into a strike in February 2003. When Howes issued a statement saying that arrangements had been made to assure no interruption of service, the Royal Gazette lampooned him by showing the airport manager atop the control tower in a Boy Scout uniform controlling the airplanes with signal flags, with the ministers of transport and labour underneath. Howes was on Bermuda's Scout executive committee at the time.

When Hurricane Fabian struck in 2003 and did over $15 million in damage to the airport, Howes had it operating again in three days. Before departing the airport on May 1, 2007, to take over his radio syndication company in Florida, Howes initiated the development, with HNTB, a 20-year master plan for the Bermuda International Airport, including future runway and airline terminal facilities. In his 2019 book, Whom Shall I Fear?, Brown provides a retrospective of his years in Bermuda government. He wrote that Howes' "leadership skills and managerial acumen ... proved his value to the airport and Bermuda's air service in myriad ways".

== Other interests ==
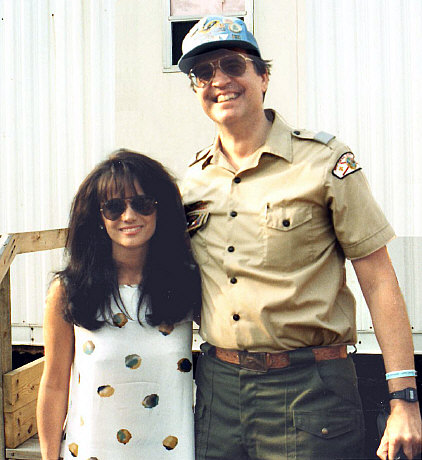
Louise Mandrell and James G. Howes a visiting National Council Representative from the West Central Florida Council at the 1993 National Scout Jamboree, Fort A.P. Hill, Virginia

Howes held a commercial pilot's license with instrument and multi-engine ratings. Other interests included scuba diving, playing the pipe organ, and photography.

He had also been active in Scouting for many years, starting when he was a Cub Scout in the Boy Scouts of America (BSA). While a Cub Scout, his unit visited Friendship Airport (now BWI). The group toured a Martin 4-0-4 airliner, including its cockpit; which began his lifelong interest in aviation. He served as vice president of the BSA's West Central Florida Council, Largo, Florida, from 1987 to 1991 and is a recipient of Scouting's Silver Beaver Award in 1990. He was also a Vigil Honor member of the Order of the Arrow, serving as a Lodge Advisor from 1974 to 1987. He was also a National Council Representative from 1992 to 1996. While residing in Bermuda, Howes was a member of the executive committee of the Bermuda Scout Association.

This connection to Scouting led to him being lampooned by a Bermuda newspaper, The Royal Gazette, in a cartoon on February 14, 2003, during an airport firefighters' strike, by showing him atop the control tower in a Boy Scout uniform controlling the airplanes with signal flags.

A Methodist, he joined the interdenominational Riverside Church in 1976, serving on the Music Committee. He was also a sponsor of musical events at the Ocean Grove Auditorium in New Jersey. In 2012, he commissioned a significant addition to the Auditorium's historic pipe organ.

Howes was an editor on the English Wikipedia, where he authored 68 articles.
