= WUWU =

WUWU may refer to:

- WAJD, a radio station (98.9 FM) licensed to Gainesville, Florida, which held the call sign WUWU from 1963 to 1971
- WLKK, a radio station (107.7 FM) licensed to Wethersfield, New York, which held the call sign WUWU from 1982 to 1986
