= WMJQ =

WMJQ may refer to:

- WMJQ-CD, a low-power television station (channel 27, virtual 40) licensed to serve Syracuse, New York, United States
- WBEE-FM, a radio station (92.5 FM) licensed to Rochester, New York which held the call sign WMJQ from 1977 to 1986
- WBKV, a radio station (102.5 FM) licensed to Buffalo, New York which held the call sign WMJQ from 1987 to 2000
- WZCC, a radio station (1240 AM) licensed to Cross City, Florida, United States, which held the call sign WMJQ in 2008
- WYNY (AM), a radio station (1450 AM) licensed to Milford, Pennsylvania, United States, which held the call sign WMJQ from 2010 to 2011
