= WRBD =

WRBD may refer to:

- WRBD (AM), a radio station (1230 AM) licensed to serve Gainesville, Florida, United States
- WWNN, a radio station (1470 AM) licensed to serve Pompano Beach, Florida, which held the call sign WRBD from 1963 to 1997
