= WLMS =

WLMS may refer to:

- WLMS-LD, a low-power television station (channel 25) licensed to serve Columbus, Mississippi, United States
- WLMS (FM), a defunct radio station (88.3 FM) formerly licensed to serve Lecanto, Florida, United States
- WCMX, a radio station (1000 AM) licensed to serve Leominster, Massachusetts, United States, which held the call sign WLMS from 1967 to 1982
- Winter Le Mans Series, alternate brand name used for the 2026–27 Asian Le Mans Series season as it was held in Europe
