= WNDT =

WNDT may refer to:

- WNDT-CD, a television station (channel 14) licensed to Manhattan, New York, United States
- WNDD (FM), a radio station (92.5 FM) licensed to Alachua, Florida, United States, which held the call sign WNDT from 1996 to 2019
- WNET, a television station (channel 13) licensed to Newark, New Jersey, United States, which held the call sign WNDT from 1962 to 1970
