= WIUJ =

Radio station in Charlotte Amalie, U.S. Virgin Islands (1975–2020)

- Charlotte Amalie, U.S. Virgin Islands; United States
- Frequency: 102.9 MHz

Programming
- Format: Variety

Ownership
- Owner: Virgin Island Youth Development Radio, Inc.

History
- First air date: August 1975
- Last air date: January 31, 2020

Technical information
- Licensing authority: FCC
- Facility ID: 70026
- Class: A
- ERP: 1,500 watts
- HAAT: 435 meters (1,427 ft)
- Transmitter coordinates: 18°21′26″N 64°56′50″W

Links
- Public license information: Public file; LMS

WIUJ (102.9 FM) was a non-commercial radio station licensed to serve Charlotte Amalie, U.S. Virgin Islands. The station was owned by Virgin Island Youth Development Radio, Inc. It aired a variety format featuring jazz, classical, and Caribbean music, plus news, current events coverage, as well as live daily broadcasts of the Virgin Islands Senate.

WIUJ's studios and transmitter were located on the premises of WTJX-TV on St. Thomas, US Virgin Islands. WIUJ had been assigned these call letters by the Federal Communications Commission since it was originally licensed.

The station ceased operations on January 31, 2020, after more than 44 years on the air. Its license was cancelled February 4, 2020.
