= WRUF-FM =

Radio station in Gainesville, Florida

- Gainesville, Florida; United States
- Broadcast area: Gainesville metropolitan area; Ocala
- Frequency: 103.7 MHz (HD Radio)
- Branding: Country 103.7, The Gator

Programming
- Format: Country
- Subchannels: HD2: ESPN Radio (WRUF); HD3: NOAA Weather Radio
- Affiliations: Compass Media Networks; Premiere Networks; Westwood One

Ownership
- Owner: University of Florida
- Operator: Saga Communications
- Sister stations: via UF: WUFT; WUFT-FM; WUFQ; WRUF-LD; WRUF; via Saga: WNDD; WOGK; WYND-FM

History
- First air date: 1948
- Call sign meaning: Radio from the University of Florida

Technical information
- Licensing authority: FCC
- Facility ID: 66575
- Class: C1
- ERP: 100,000 watts
- HAAT: 234 meters (768 ft)
- Transmitter coordinates: 29°42′34.00″N 82°23′40.00″W

Links
- Public license information: Public file; LMS
- Webcast: Listen live
- Website: 1037thegator.com

WRUF-FM (103.7 FM) is a commercial radio station licensed to Gainesville, Florida, United States, broadcasting a country music format. It is owned by the University of Florida; while the university is a non-profit organization owned by the State of Florida, WRUF-FM and WRUF are operated as commercial stations, supported by advertising through a joint sales agreement (JSA) with Saga Communications, in contrast to co-owned NPR member WUFT-FM, and emergency station WUFQ, both non-commercial outlets. The studios and offices are inside the Flanagan wing of Weimer Hall within the College of Journalism and Communications on the university's campus on Stadium Road in Gainesville.

WRUF-FM's transmitter tower is off NW 53rd Avenue at Devil's Millhopper Geological State Park.

== History ==
=== Beautiful and Classical Music ===
WRUF-FM signed on the air in 1948, among the earliest FM stations in Florida. In its first decades, it largely simulcast the programming on 850 WRUF. The stations were network affiliates of the Mutual Broadcasting System.

In its early years, WRUF-FM was powered at 12,000 watts, a fraction of its current output. From the 1960s to 1981, WRUF-FM played beautiful music and classical music under the moniker "Stereo 104." The one exception was a Saturday-night disco music program from 1979-1980 called "Studio 104."

=== Top 40 and Album Rock ===
By the early 1980s, the easy listening format was beginning to age. WRUF-FM flipped to a Top 40 format from 1981 to 1983. The hit music format was adopted because another local FM station had recently begun playing hits on the FM dial with great success. For many years, WRUF 850 AM had a Top 40 format, so technically, it was an easy switch, though many important powers at the university disfavored putting teen-oriented music on the FM station.

WRUF-FM became an album-oriented rock (AOR) station in 1983. It called itself "Rock 104". The station played songs from the best-selling rock albums of the day. The rock format continued for nearly three decades.

=== Country music ===
On October 11, 2010, the university announced that WRUF-FM would soon switch to a country music format. The "Rock 104" name and format would be moved to an internet-only station. Country music was gaining in listeners and management decided WRUF-FM would take advantage of its popularity.

On October 15, 2010, WRUF-FM made the format change, branded as "Country 103.7, The Gator". (University of Florida sports teams are called the Gators, which is short for alligator, an animal common in local swamps.) The first song played under the new format was "Roll with It" by Easton Corbin.

On August 28, 2012, it was announced that the University of Florida College of Journalism and Communications signed a seven-year joint sales agreement with Entercom Communications (now Audacy, Inc.), effective September 1.

On August 6, 2026, the University of Florida College of Journalism and Communications announced that they had entered a new seven-year joint sales agreement with Saga Communications effective September 1, parting from Audacy after 14 years.

== Programming ==
Local personalities on WRUF-FM include Allie and Tommy Bodean; the station also carries The Bobby Bones Show and After Midnite with Granger Smith. WRUF-FM also simulcasts most big university sporting events, including Florida Gators football, men's basketball, and Sunday baseball games.

=== Past personalities ===
- Paul Castronovo, host of the syndicated morning radio program, ‘The Paul & Young Ron Show’, was a former Rock 104 disc jockey, as well as a graduate of the University of Florida.
- Conservative talk radio personality Andrew Wilkow, host of an eponymous show on Sirius Satellite Radio's "Sirius Patriot", is an alumnus of the station, having spent the latter half of his college years at the University of Florida. Unlike his current calling, his work at WRUF was solely as a disk jockey.
- Rich Fields, the former announcer for CBS's The Price Is Right and Gameshow Marathon, was a former WRUF-FM afternoon drive disc jockey and music director, as well as a graduate of the University of Florida. Rich Fields is also a recipient of the Red Barber Award for Broadcasting Excellence.
- Brad Abrell, co-host of the syndicated morning radio program, ‘The Ashley & Brad Show’, was a former Rock 104 disc jockey, as well as a graduate of the University of Florida.
