= Sacred Classics =

American Christian radio program (1983–2021)

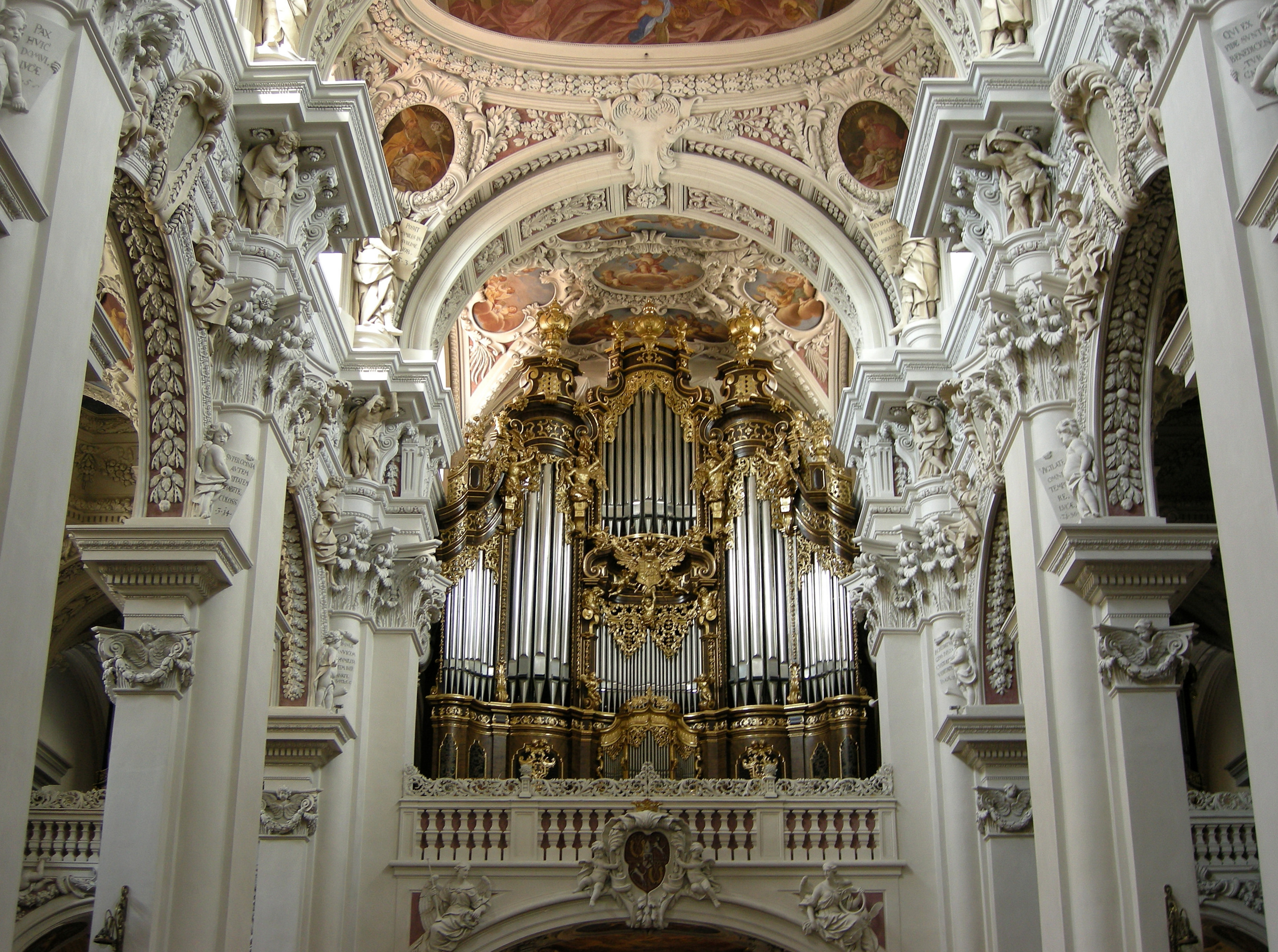
- The organ of St. Stephen's Cathedral, Passau, Germany, among the renowned instruments featured on Sacred Classics
- Other names: Choral Masterpieces, King of Instruments
- Genre: Choral and organ music
- Running time: 2 hours
- Country of origin: United States
- Language: English
- Home station: WBVM
- Hosted by: James G. "Jim" Howes
- Produced by: Atlas Communications
- Executive producer: James G. Howes
- Original release: October 1983 – September 2021
- No. of episodes: 1,831+
- Audio format: Stereophonic sound
- Opening theme: He is risen (Unser Herrscher by Joachim Neander, arranged by Richard Webster)
- Ending theme: King of Kings by Miklós Rózsa
- Website: www.sacredclassics.com

Sacred Classics was a weekly two-hour radio show originating from WBVM-FM in Tampa, Florida, featuring choral and organ music from international venues. Founded in October 1983, it was broadcast on Saturdays and Sundays, as well as streamed over the Internet at various times to accommodate listeners worldwide. The program was produced by Atlas Communications and hosted by Jim Howes, who used the thousands of pipe organ and choral recordings in his personal collection, gathered from his travels around the world. Programs typically included music from such diverse locations as England, Germany, South Africa, Latvia (Riga), and Australia (Sydney), along with prominent church choirs and organists in the U.S. Live organ concerts were also sponsored and recorded for later broadcast, as in 2004 when celebrated organist Frederick Swann performed at the 88-rank organ of St. Paul's Anglican Church in Bermuda. The final showed aired on September 26, 2021.

== Production ==
Howes, who was a former executive director of the Bermuda International Airport (2002–2007) and St. Petersburg-Clearwater International Airport (1980–2001), produced the program at WBVM's studios in Florida. When he was in Bermuda, he told the Bermuda Sun, several weeks' programs were pre-recorded at a time during trips to his home in Florida, using his personal library. Howes regularly received emails from his audience in Europe, the Mideast, and the Philippines.

Tom Derzypolski, then-vice president of WBVM-FM in Tampa, told the St. Petersburg Times in 1997 that the show is "extremely popular. Jim mixes some of the pieces that he picks up traveling around the world with some of the sacred classics. A lot of the selections that he broadcasts are literally not available. He provides a unique blend". Howes said he "enjoys conversing with the audience and providing sacred masterpieces performed at famous cathedrals and concert halls".

On location live recordings were also occasionally broadcast. Past venues have included the Cathedral of St. John the Divine, New York, the Ocean Grove Auditorium in New Jersey, St. Paul's Anglican Church in Bermuda, and Brown Memorial Presbyterian Church in Baltimore, Maryland. Recordings made at prominent Florida churches were also featured. In 2021, for example, the choir and organ at Orlando's Mary, Queen of the Universe Shrine was broadcast, as well as Coral Ridge Presbyterian Church in Fort Lauderdale and the First Methodist Church of St. Petersburg.

== History ==
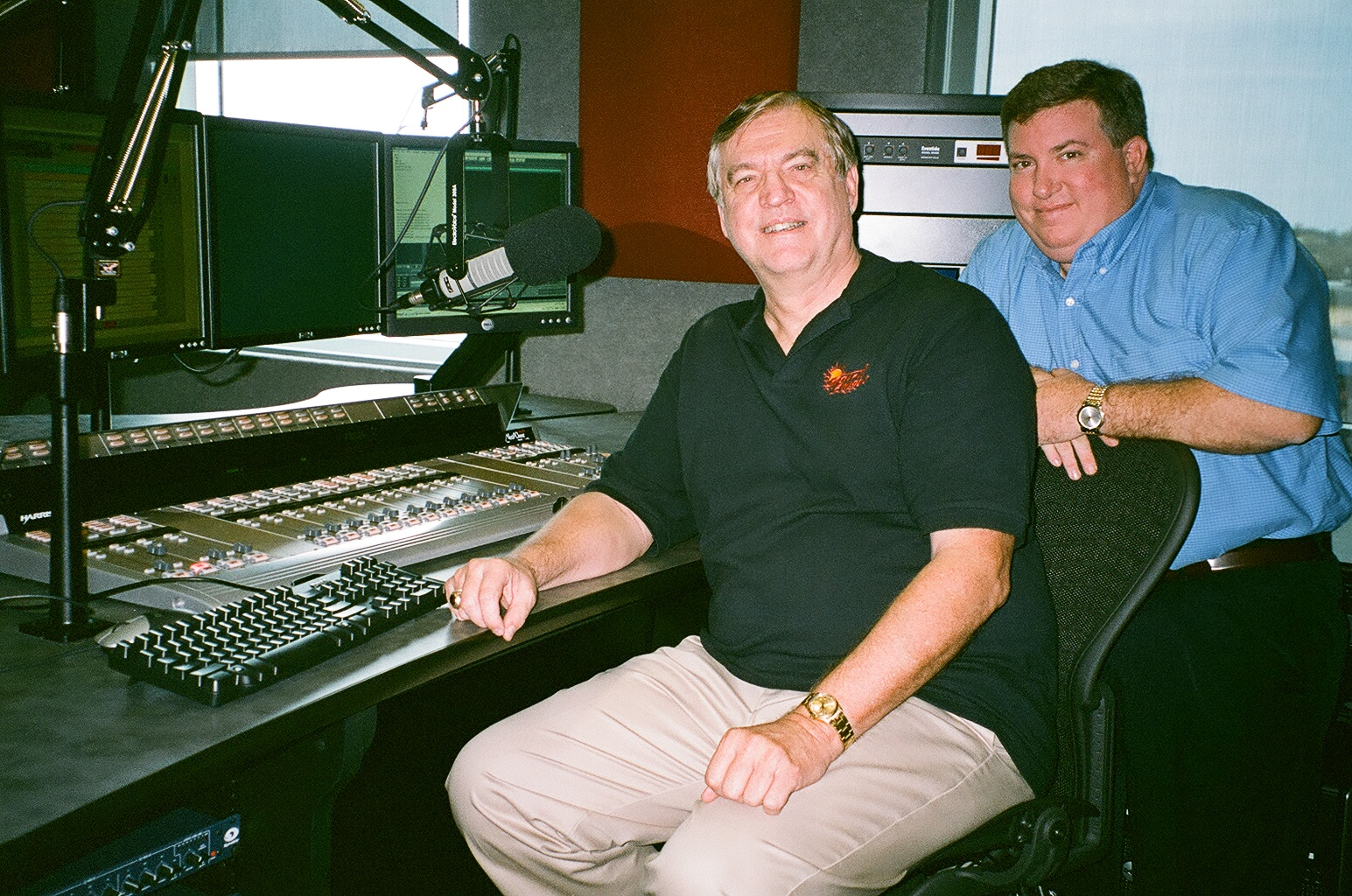
WBVM Station Manager John Morris (right) with Jim Howes at the Tampa studios

Sacred Classics was initially two distinct programs, King of Instruments and Choral Masterpieces, both produced by Howes for the old WXCR beginning in 1983 and 1985, respectively. After production moved to WBVM in 1986, a new current format combining choral and organ music was adopted and the program was expanded to two hours in length and retitled Sacred Classics. On the show's 25th anniversary broadcast in 2008, Frederick Swann, president of the American Guild of Organists, expressed the organization's "great debt of gratitude for the joy that Sacred Classics has brought untold thousands of listeners over the years". Premier of Bermuda Ewart Brown sent his "sincere congratulations", saying he "hopes Sacred Classics enjoys another 25 great years". The show celebrated its 35th anniversary on the air in October 2018.

In addition to streaming Sacred Classics on the internet, the program's website also maintained a widely consulted ranking of the world's largest pipe organs, based on independently researched and verified specifications.

Howes died unexpectedly at age 75 at his home in Safety Harbor, Florida. His final pre-recorded show aired on WBVM on September 26, 2021.
