= WMOP =

Radio station in Ocala, Florida

Coordinates: 29°14′16.91″N 82°7′15.33″W

Simulcasts WRBD Gainesville
- Ocala, Florida; United States
- Broadcast area: Gainesville-Ocala-Central Florida
- Frequency: 900 kHz
- Branding: Power 92.1

Programming
- Format: Urban contemporary
- Affiliations: Compass Media Networks

Ownership
- Owner: William Johnson; (Urban One Broadcasting Network, LLC)
- Sister stations: WRBD

History
- First air date: December 18, 1953

Technical information
- Licensing authority: FCC
- Facility ID: 73278
- Class: D
- Power: 2,700 watts days; 23 watts nights

Links
- Public license information: Public file; LMS
- Webcast: Listen live
- Website: powerstation92.com

WMOP (900 kHz) is a commercial AM radio station in Ocala, Florida, broadcasting to the Gainesville-Ocala-Central Florida area. It simulcasts an urban contemporary format with WRBD (1240 AM) in Gainesville. They are owned by the Urban One Broadcasting Network headed by radio personality William Johnson. (It is not affiliated with Urban One, Inc., based in the Washington, D.C. area.) WMOP has studios and offices on SW 6th Avenue in Ocala. The station is called "Power 92.1", in reference to the dial position for WRBD's FM translator.

WMOP is a Class D AM station. By day, it is powered at 2,700 watts. To protect other stations on 980 AM from interference, at night it reduces its power to 23 watts. It uses a non-directional antenna. The transmitter tower is on NE 49th Street near Old U.S. Route 301 in Ocala.

== History ==
WMOP originally signed on the air on December 18, 1952. It has always had the same call letters. From 1961 to 1985, WMOP had an FM sister station at 93.7 FM, which was then WFUZ. It is now known as WOGK, a country music station owned by Saga Communications.

WMOP switched to a sports radio format in 1996. It aired programming from CBS Sports Radio. WMOP was known as "The Goat"; Goat stood for "Greatest of All Time", a term used for the outstanding star of a particular sport.

WMOP was previously simulcast on FM translator W261BA at 100.1 FM in Ocala. That translator now carries The True Oldies Channel.
