= WVIF =

Television station in Christiansted, U.S. Virgin Islands (2000–2009)

- Christiansted; United States Virgin Islands
- Channels: Analog: 15 (UHF)

Programming
- Affiliations: Pax (2000–2003); Independent (2003–2009; intermittent operation)

Ownership
- Owner: Corporate Media Consultants Group (49% owned by Max Media); (CMCG St. Croix License, LLC)

History
- Founded: December 18, 1998
- First air date: December 27, 2000
- Last air date: June 12, 2009
- Former call signs: WBJE (1999–2000); WPXO (2000–2003); WCAV (2003–2004)
- Call sign meaning: "Virgin Islands Fox" (possibly for unrealized affiliation) or "Virgin Islands Fifteen" (channel number)

Technical information
- Licensing authority: FCC
- Facility ID: 84407
- ERP: 16.2 kW
- HAAT: 296 m (971 ft)
- Transmitter coordinates: 17°45′14″N 64°47′55″W

Links
- Public license information: Public file; LMS

WVIF (channel 15) was a television station serving the United States Virgin Islands that was licensed to Christiansted, Saint Croix. The station was owned by Corporate Media Consultants Group (CMCG), which is 49 percent owned by Max Media.

For much of its history, WVIF was silent, occasionally returning to the air as an independent station. At one time, it had planned to affiliate with the Fox network.

== History ==
Channel 15 signed on for the first time on December 27, 2000, as Pax TV (now Ion) owned-and-operated station WPXO. WPXO was operated under a joint services agreement (JSA) with Alpha Broadcasting Corporation's WSVI (channel 8) in Christiansted. Paxson Communications (now Ion Media Networks) sold WPXO (along with WMPX-TV, now WPFO, in Waterville, Maine) to CMCG in December 2002. Soon afterward, the JSA with WSVI was dissolved due to station financial losses of over $250,000.

Upon assuming control of the station in April 2003, CMCG changed the call letters to WCAV and temporarily discontinued operations, leaving channel 15 silent for 12 months less a day; the station returned to the air at 2 p.m. on April 4, 2004, as an independent station, relying largely on syndicated core programming, after having failed to obtain cable carriage and having lost its bid for the Fox affiliation (which ultimately went to WEON-LP). Shortly afterward, the station changed its call letters to WVIF (the WCAV call letters were then picked up by the CBS affiliate in Charlottesville, Virginia).

The station again went silent in 2005 and remained silent throughout 2006-07 despite attempts to return to operation.

Located in the University of the Virgin Islands Research and Technology Park, the station had two employees but, as of August 2007, broadcast antenna facilities had not been constructed. In 2007, the station's owner had estimated that construction of the necessary facilities "could take at least another year". The use of WVIF production facilities in engaging and training UVI students in various station operation tasks had also been promoted, but was never operational.

As of September 2008, the station had moved to a new antenna tower, resuming analog television broadcast operation.

WVIF never operated a digital television station. It had intended to apply to the Federal Communications Commission (FCC) for permission to turn off any analog signals and begin broadcast of a digital signal on the same channel (called a "flash-cut") at the end of the digital TV conversion period for full-service stations (June 12, 2009). The station never did so, and its license was canceled on March 29, 2011.
