= WRUF (AM) =

Radio station in Gainesville, Florida

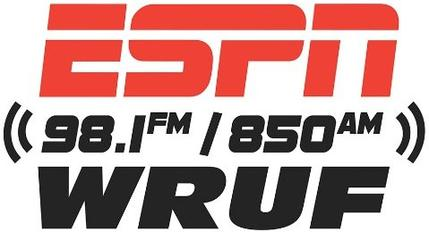

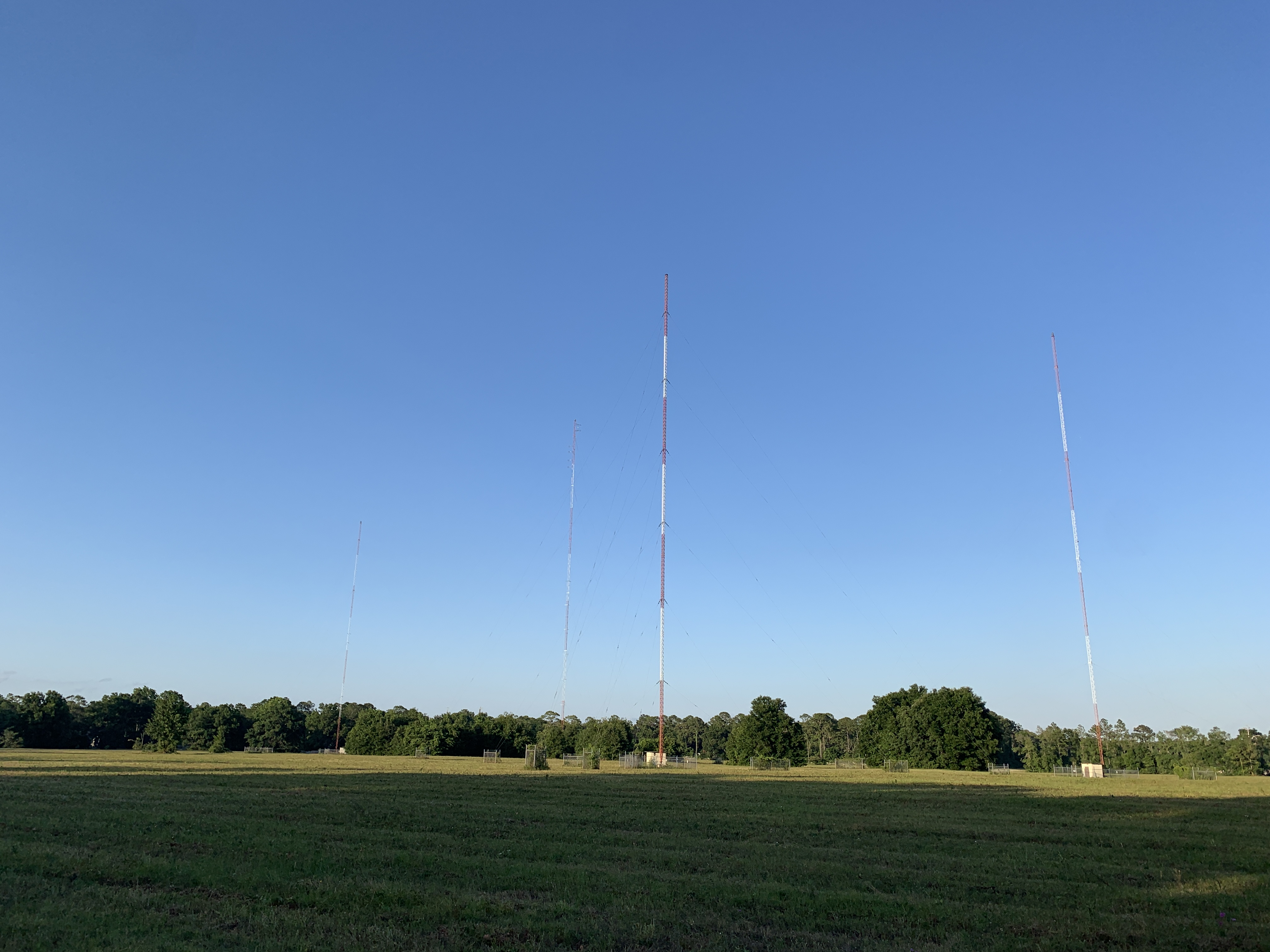
- WRUF broadcast towers
- Gainesville, Florida; United States
- Broadcast area: Gainesville metropolitan area; Ocala
- Frequency: 850 kHz
- Branding: ESPN 98.1 FM / 850 AM WRUF

Programming
- Format: Sports radio
- Affiliations: ESPN Radio

Ownership
- Owner: University of Florida
- Operator: Saga Communications
- Sister stations: via UF: WRUF-FM; WRUF-LD; WUFQ; WUFT; WUFT-FM; via Saga: WNDD; WOGK; WYND-FM

History
- First air date: October 1928
- Call sign meaning: "Radio from the University of Florida"

Technical information
- Licensing authority: FCC
- Facility ID: 69151
- Class: D
- Power: 5,000 watts (day); 86 watts (night)
- Transmitter coordinates: 29°38′37.2″N 82°25′8.9″W
- Translator: 98.1 W251CG (Gainesville)
- Repeater: 103.7 WRUF-HD2 (Gainesville)

Links
- Public license information: Public file; LMS
- Webcast: Listen live
- Website: www.wruf.com

WRUF (850 AM) is a commercial radio station licensed to Gainesville, Florida, United States, and serving the Ocala and Gainesville metropolitan area. While owned by the University of Florida (along with public stations WUFT, WUFT-FM, and WUFQ), with shared studios inside the Flanagan wing of Weimer Hall within the College of Journalism and Communications, on the university's campus on Stadium Road in Gainesville, it and WRUF-FM are supported by advertising through a joint sales agreement with Saga Communications. WRUF features a sports radio station affiliated with ESPN Radio and primarily covers Florida Gators athletics. WRUF's transmitter is sited on SW 8th Avenue in Gainesville. Programming is also heard on low-power FM translator W251CG at 98.1 MHz.

== History ==
WRUF is the fifth-oldest radio station in the state. It signed on the air in October 1928. In the early days of broadcasting, professors and students at several universities experimented with radio transmission, including at the University of Florida. WRUF originally broadcast at 830 kilocycles and was a daytimer, required to go off the air at sunset. With the 1941 enactment of the North American Regional Broadcasting Agreement (NARBA), WRUF moved to 850 AM and became an affiliate of the Mutual Broadcasting System.

A WRUF microphone used by UF alumnus Red Barber during the 1930s is part of the National Baseball Hall of Fame and Museum's collection. It has been displayed in the museum's "Scribes and Mikemen" exhibit, and from 2002 to 2006, it was a part of the "Baseball as America" traveling exhibition.

In 1948, WRUF added an FM sister station. WRUF-FM was among the earliest FM stations in Florida. The two stations simulcast most of their programs in the 40s and 50s. WRUF-FM began playing classical music with separate programming in the 1960s and today it is a country music station.

Beginning in 1993, WRUF cancelled all its music shows. It became a talk radio station, known as Newsradio AM 850 WRUF. It featured a mixture of local and syndicated talk programs, including Jim Bohannon, Dr. Joy Browne, Larry King Live and Sporting News Radio, plus religious programming on Sunday mornings. The Director of Programming is Rob Harder, Assistant Program Director/Brand Manager is Seth Harp, and the Sports Director is Steve Russell.

In 2010, WRUF changed its format from news, talk, and sports to all-sports, branding as Sportsradio 850. On June 29, 2012, WRUF became a network affiliate of ESPN Radio.

On August 28, 2012, it was announced that the University of Florida College of Journalism and Communications signed a seven-year joint sales agreement with Entercom Communications (now Audacy, Inc.), effective September 1.

On August 6, 2026, the University of Florida College of Journalism and Communications announced that they had entered a new seven-year joint sales agreement with Saga Communications effective September 1, parting from Audacy after 14 years.

== Programming ==
As a commercial station owned by the university, WRUF is the flagship station for the Florida Gators football, basketball, baseball, women's basketball, lacrosse, soccer, and volleyball teams. Co-owned WRUF-FM also airs most Gators football games and some other Gators games as well. WRUF has a fairly large sports department for a station of its size, staffed almost entirely by College of Journalism students.

WRUF is north central Florida's affiliate for all three of Tampa's major professional sports teams: the Tampa Bay Rays of Major League Baseball, the Tampa Bay Lightning of the National Hockey League, and since 2020, the Tampa Bay Buccaneers of the National Football League. When not covering live sports or discussing the Gators, WRUF carries ESPN Radio programming.

== Translator ==
On August 19, 2015, WRUF began simulcasting on FM translator W237EJ 95.3 FM in Gainesville. It exists mainly to fill in the gaps because Tower No. 3 of their directional AM array failed in 2016, and the FCC granted permission to operate non-directionally after sunset at 25% of licensed power. Shortly afterward, the station changed its branding from "ESPN 850" to "ESPN 95.3," after the translator.

On December 1, 2016, WRUF switched its FM translator from W237EJ 95.3 FM Gainesville, to W251CG 98.1 FM Gainesville.

== Previous logo ==
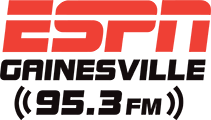
(WRUF's logo under previous 95.3 FM translator)
