= WLQH =

- Chiefland, Florida; United States
- Frequency: 940 kHz
- Branding: Country Legends

Programming
- Format: Classic country (WZCC simulcast)

Ownership
- Owner: Suncoast Broadcasting
- Sister stations: WWCQ, WZCC

History
- First air date: 1968

Technical information
- Licensing authority: FCC
- Facility ID: 72200
- Class: D
- Power: 780 watts day 15 watts night
- Transmitter coordinates: 29°31′0.00″N 82°53′11.00″W
- Translator: 93.1 W226CI (Chiefland)

Links
- Public license information: Public file; LMS
- Webcast: Listen live
- Website: Official website

WLQH (940 AM) is a radio station broadcasting a classic country format, licensed to Chiefland, Florida.

WLQH debuted June 6, 1968, as a 500-watt, daytime-only facility, originally owned by White Construction Company of Chiefland and broadcasting country music during the morning and early afternoon hours and Top 40 during afternoon drive time. Luther White was the station's president, C. Wesley Ward served as general manager and news director, and Ruth M. Ward was the station's program director, while Billy Mayo was the Top 40 announcer and program director. The station is currently owned by Suncoast Broadcasting.

In 2014 WLQH entered into a simulcast with WZCC AM 1240 in Cross City and its FM translator W227AV 93.3 MHz in Newberry, which serves an area between Chiefland and Fanning Springs.

Though authorized to broadcast at 15 watts at night, WLQH is still licensed as a Class D (Daytime) station, to protect Class-A clear-channel station XEQ-AM Mexico City, as well as a vacant allocation in Montreal, Quebec, Canada.

Former logo
