= WLMS (FM) =

Lecanto, Florida; United States
- Frequency: 88.3 MHz

Programming
- Format: Defunct (was Contemporary Christian)

Ownership
- Owner: Central Florida Educational Foundation

History
- First air date: March 8, 1991 (as WZQF)
- Last air date: October 2008
- Former call signs: WZQF (1991–1992); WDSP (1992)

Technical information
- Facility ID: 65474
- Class: A
- ERP: 4,100 watts
- HAAT: 72.9 meters
- Transmitter coordinates: 28°53′1.00″N 82°31′21.00″W

WLMS (88.3 FM) was a radio station broadcasting a Contemporary Christian format until October 2008, licensed to Lecanto, Florida, United States. The station was owned by the Roman Catholic Diocese of Saint Petersburg from 1992 to 2008, simulcasting programs from WBVM in Tampa. In October 2008, the license for WLMS was sold to Central Florida Educational Foundation and WLMS ceased broadcasting to enable a power increase by WPOZ, also owned by Central Florida Educational Foundation. Following WLMS's closure, a new radio station in Cross City, WWLC 88.5 FM, would be established as its replacement.

== History ==
former logo as WLMS

The station went on the air as WZQF on March 8, 1991, changing its call sign to WDSP on March 2, 1992, and then WLMS on May 1, 1992, where it broadcast a gospel music format. As of July 2009, WLMS is no longer in the FCC database.
