= WTVL-CD =

Television station in Chattanooga, Tennessee

- Chattanooga, Tennessee (Note: Originally licensed to Dalton, Georgia; moved to Chattanooga in 2025.); United States
- Channels: Digital: 20 (UHF); Virtual: 49

Programming
- Affiliations: 49.1: Telemundo; for others, see § Subchannels

Ownership
- Owner: Gray Media; (Gray Television Licensee, LLC)
- Sister stations: WDNN-CD

History
- Founded: December 9, 1992
- Former call signs: W47BA (1992–1998); WDGA-LP (1998–2003); WDGA-CA (2003); WDNN-CA (2003–2015); WDNN-CD (2015–2025)
- Former channel numbers: Analog: 47 (UHF, 1994–2002), 49 (UHF, 2002–2015); Digital: 49 (UHF, 2015–2020)
- Former affiliations: FamilyNet; My Family TV; Independent

Technical information
- Licensing authority: FCC
- Facility ID: 49236
- Class: CD
- ERP: 15 kW
- HAAT: 337.5 m (1,107 ft)
- Transmitter coordinates: 35°12′36″N 85°16′42.3″W

Links
- Public license information: Public file; LMS

WTVL-CD (channel 49) is a low-power, Class A television station in Chattanooga, Tennessee, United States, affiliated with the Spanish-language network Telemundo. Owned by Gray Media, the station maintains a transmitter on Sawyer Cemetery Road in unincorporated west-central Hamilton County (near Walden).

== History ==
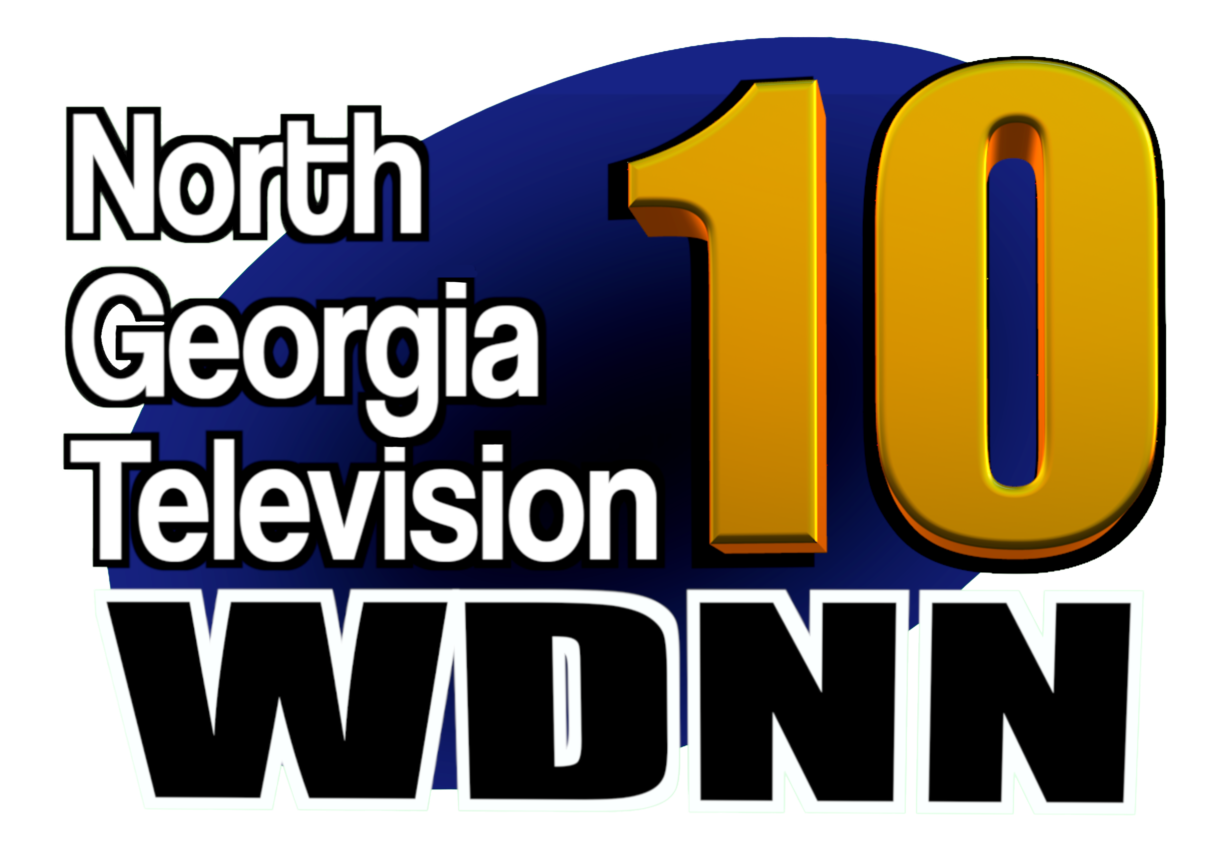
Logo used until 2025

Originally licensed to Dalton, Georgia, the station started broadcasting in May 1992 as W47BA. The station was created to serve the community through locally produced programs. The staff initially consisted of Doug Jensen, Doug Smith, Sherry Wein and James Logan.

In the spring of 1993, W47BA started a daily newscast called NewsWatch 10. It was at that time that Calvin Means and three reporters joined the news team. The station grew from being on one cable system to four systems that cover Northwest Georgia. WDNN then added WLFW, WRNG, and WDGA to broadcast their programs over the air. WDGA-CD had been affiliated with the Spanish-language network Azteca América until December 1, 2012, when it became an affiliate of Heartland.

Following the FCC incentive auction of 2016–17, WDNN had to begin moving off digital channel 49, which it did in 2020. As part of the same process, WDGA-CD was moved to channel 30.

In late 2018, WDNN and WDGA were purchased by Troy Hall for $500,000.

In December 2024, it was announced that Troy Hall would part ways with WDNN and WDGA and sell the stations to Gray Media for $835,000.

On December 18, 2025, WDNN changed its call sign to WTVL-CD.

In February 2026, WTVL-CD became a Telemundo affiliate.

== Local programming ==
Prior to the switch to Telemundo, WDNN-CD aired sports programming, such as high school soccer and a show called Sports Zone which started in 2009, alongside an annual Christmas special.

== Subchannels ==
The station's signal is multiplexed:

Subchannels of WTVL-CD
Subchannel	Res.	Short name	Programming
49.1	1080i	WDNN	Telemundo
49.2	720p	TVSEN	Tennessee Valley SEN
49.3	480i	HI	Heroes & Icons
49.4	480i	TOONS	MeTV Toons
49.5	480i	STORY	Story Television
49.6	480i	3ABN	3ABN
49.7	480i	LOCAL	Weather

== Former sister stations ==
North Georgia Television also owned WTNB-CA in Cleveland, Tennessee, until selling it to PTP Holdings in 2009; in 2005, WTNB and WDNN both offered similar schedules featuring FamilyNet and local programming, but WTNB produced its own local programming separate from WDNN and its repeaters. WDNN-CD was also repeated by LaFayette, Georgia's WLFW-LP (channel 41) until February 16, 2017, when the Federal Communications Commission canceled WLFW-LP's license.
