= WUFQ =

Beacon radio station in Cross City, Florida

- Cross City, Florida; United States
- Frequency: 88.5 MHz

Programming
- Format: Classical music

Ownership
- Owner: University of Florida; (University of Florida Board of Trustees)
- Sister stations: WUFT, WUFT-FM, WRUF, WRUF-FM, WRUF-LD

History
- Former call signs: WWLC (2002–2020)
- Call sign meaning: University of Florida

Technical information
- Licensing authority: FCC
- Facility ID: 121772
- Class: C3
- ERP: 20,000 watts
- HAAT: 87.8 meters (288 ft)
- Transmitter coordinates: 29°31′35.00″N 83°14′17.00″W

Links
- Public license information: Public file; LMS

WUFQ (88.5 FM) was a radio station licensed in Cross City, Florida. The station was owned by the University of Florida Board of Trustees.

The station was established in 2009 as WWLC, a replacement station for WBVM's Lecanto satellite, WLMS 88.3 FM, which, like WBVM, was owned by the neighboring Roman Catholic Diocese of Saint Petersburg. WLMS was acquired in late 2008 by the Central Florida Educational Foundation and was closed down, to enable like-minded Orlando station WPOZ (also on 88.3 FM) to increase its power.

Effective July 26, 2019, the Roman Catholic Diocese of St. Augustine donated the station's license to the University of Florida. The station previously aired WUFT-HD2's "WUFT Classic" until late 2024. From there until mid-2026, simulcasted emergency information of the HD4 channel of WUFT-FM from Gainesville, Florida. The station's license was canceled on July 22, 2026.
