= WYND-FM =

Radio station in Silver Springs, Florida

Simulcast of WNDD, Alachua
- Silver Springs, Florida; United States
- Broadcast area: Ocala, Florida
- Frequency: 95.5 MHz (HD Radio)
- Branding: Wind-FM

Programming
- Format: Classic rock
- Affiliations: Compass Media Networks; United Stations Radio Networks

Ownership
- Owner: Saga Communications; (Saga South Communications, LLC)
- Sister stations: WNDD; WOGK

History
- First air date: February 1, 1991
- Former call signs: WGGO-FM (1992–1993); WWGO (1993–1994); WLVX (1994–1995); WNDD (1995–2019)
- Call sign meaning: "Wind"

Technical information
- Licensing authority: FCC
- Facility ID: 1099
- Class: A
- ERP: 2,550 watts
- HAAT: 156 meters (512 ft)
- Transmitter coordinates: 29.282°N 82.047°W

Links
- Public license information: Public file; LMS
- Webcast: Listen live
- Website: www.windfm.com

WYND-FM (95.5 FM, "Wind-FM") is a commercial radio station licensed to Silver Springs, Florida, United States, broadcasting to the Ocala area of Central Florida. WYND-FM and sister station WNDD jointly simulcast a classic rock format. They are owned by Saga Communications with studios located on East Fort King Street in Ocala.

The transmitter is on NW 79th Street in Anthony, Florida.

== History ==
The station signed on the air on February 1, 1991 with original call sign WGGO-FM.

On October 30, 2018, it was announced that Dix Communications would sell WNDD, WOGK, WNDD, WNDN and WDNT to Saga Communications for $9.3 million.
