= WTJX-FM =

Public radio station in Charlotte Amalie, U.S. Virgin Islands

- Charlotte Amalie, U.S. Virgin Islands; United States
- Frequency: 93.1 MHz (HD Radio)
- Branding: WTJX NPR

Programming
- Format: Public radio
- Subchannels: HD1: WTJX-FM analog HD2: Afrobeats "WTJX Afro"
- Affiliations: National Public Radio

Ownership
- Owner: Virgin Islands Public Broadcasting System
- Sister stations: WTJX-TV

History
- First air date: January 12, 2015

Technical information
- Licensing authority: FCC
- Facility ID: 184714
- Class: A
- Power: 1,300 watts
- HAAT: 475 meters (1,558 ft)
- Transmitter coordinates: 18°21′28″N 64°56′53″W

Links
- Public license information: Public file; LMS
- Webcast: Listen live
- Website: www.wtjx.org

WTJX-FM (93.1 MHz) is a non-commercial, educational public radio station, serving as the NPR network affiliate for the United States Virgin Islands. The station is licensed to Charlotte Amalie. The station is owned and operated by the Virgin Islands Public Broadcasting System, which also owns sister station WTJX-TV, a PBS affiliate.

The station signed on the air on January 12, 2015.
