= WUFT-FM =

Radio station in Gainesville, Florida

WUFT-FM and WJUF
WUFT-FM: Gainesville, Florida; WJUF: Inverness, Florida; United States
- Broadcast area: Gainesville-Ocala, Florida
- Frequencies: WUFT-FM: 89.1 MHz (HD Radio); WJUF: 90.1 MHz (HD Radio)
- Branding: WUFT NPR

Programming
- Format: Public radio
- Subchannels: HD2: Classical "WUFT Classic"; WUFT-FM HD3: Top 40/CHR "GHQ"; WJUF-HD3: NOAA Weather Radio; WUFT-FM HD4: Emergency information "Beacon"
- Affiliations: NPR; American Public Media; Public Radio Exchange; BBC World Service; WNYC Studios

Ownership
- Owner: University of Florida
- Sister stations: WUFT; WUFQ; WRUF-LD; WRUF (AM); WRUF-FM

History
- First air date: WUFT-FM: September 27, 1981; WJUF: November 10, 1995
- Call sign meaning: WUFT-FM: "University of Florida Television" (after its television counterpart); WJUF: University of Florida

Technical information
- Facility ID: WUFT-FM: 66604; WJUF: 985
- Class: WUFT-FM: C1; WJUF: C2
- ERP: WUFT-FM: 100,000 watts; WJUF: 21,000 watts
- HAAT: WUFT-FM: 235 meters (771 ft); WJUF: 121 meters (397 ft)
- Transmitter coordinates: WUFT-FM: 29°42′34.9″N 82°23′39.4″W; WJUF: 28°46′40.8″N 82°28′3.3″W
- Translator(s): HD2: 102.7 W274BT (Williston); WUFT-FM HD3: 95.3 W237EJ (Gainesville)

Links
- Webcast: Listen live; HD2: Listen live; WUFT-FM HD3: Listen live
- Website: www.wuft.org; HD2: www.wuft.org/classic/; WUFT-FM HD3: ghq.fm; WUFT-FM HD4: www.beaconalwayson.com

WUFT-FM (89.1 MHz) is an NPR member radio station owned by the University of Florida in Gainesville, Florida, broadcasting news and public media programming from NPR along with other distributors including American Public Media, Public Radio Exchange, WNYC Studios and the BBC World Service. The station also operates a full-time satellite, WJUF in Inverness at 90.1 FM.

== History ==
UF has been involved in broadcasting for almost a century. It owns WRUF (850 AM and 103.7 FM), one of the oldest radio stations in the state. Sister television station WUFT-TV is Florida's third oldest public television station. Despite this pioneering role, UF was a relative latecomer to public radio. WUFT-FM did not sign on until September 27, 1981, bringing NPR programming to one of the few areas of the state still without any public radio at all. For most of its history, WUFT-FM aired a mix of classical music and NPR news programming. On August 3, 2009, WUFT-FM's programming was switched to mostly news and public affairs, while classical music was moved to WUFT-FM's HD2 digital subchannel.

WJUF signed on November 10, 1995, as a full-time repeater of WUFT-FM. For years, it was known as Nature Coast 90, but in 2010 re-branded as Florida's 89.1 along with its parent station. In August 2018, the station was rebranded once again to WUFT 89.1/90.1 to reflect the WJUF frequency.

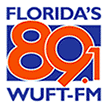
Previous logo

WUFT-FM broadcasts with 100,000 watts of effective radiated power and reaches the following counties in north-central Florida: Alachua, Union, Bradford, Gilchrist, Levy, Marion, Putnam, Clay, Columbia, Lafayette and Dixie. WJUF broadcasts with 20,000 watts of effective radiated power and reaches Sumter, Hernando, Citrus and Pasco counties. WUFT-FM can also be received in nearby St. Johns County and even as far north as Duval County.

WUFT-FM broadcasts one live weekly call-in show: Animal Airwaves - Live, hosted by Dana Hill, who interviews veterinarians from the University of Florida College of Veterinary Medicine. Previous talk programs include Connor Calling with Hank Connor (who retired) and Sikorski's Attic, hosted by antique expert John Sikorski, who answered listeners' questions about antiques and vintage collectibles. WUFT formerly had locally produced weekly programs, as well:

- The Night Bridge - a 5-night-a-week overnight (11PM to 2AM) jazz show produced by professional WUFT staff member Ben Wilson and hosted by a nightly-rotation of UF and Santa Fe students. The show served as a "learning lab" for students. Its final show aired in August 2/3, 2009, hosted by Frank C. Bracco, making him the final on-air host for WUFT-FM under the old all-music format.
- Soul Circuit - a soul/R&B-focused show on Saturdays helmed by long-time host Margi Hatch (last aired in 2020)
- Nothin' But the Blues - a blues-theme show that played local and national artists. Under its final producer and host, Frank C. Bracco, the show also featured live performances from regional bands, interviews with national artists such as Mike Zito, coverage of the Bo Diddley celebration of life following his passing in 2008, and campus recordings from student musicians. It last aired in August 1/2, 2009.
- Ballads & Blues - Hosted by long-time WUFT producer Steve Seipp, a Sunday evening addition in 2010 after the format change that featured a mix of big band, jazz, and pre-rock/"Your Hit Parade" pop vocals and instrumentals.
- On the Bridge with Kristen Wanner - A long-time Sunday afternoon country/folk show that often featured live performances and recordings from regional folk festivals. Kristen's show was the only locally produced music program to survive the 2009 format change uninterrupted.
- Theatre of the Mind - a classic "story" radio program on Sunday nights hosted by long time host Bill Sabis for almost 30 years; North-Florida local Jobi Wise helmed the show in its final years.
- Encore! classical music-focused with Dana Hill on Sunday nights.

== HD Radio ==
WUFT-FM also broadcasts in HD. WUFT-FM HD1 (89.1-HD1) simulcasts the analog signal.

=== WUFT-FM HD2 ===
WUFT-FM broadcasts a classical music format on its 89.1 HD2 channel called WUFT Classic. Programming includes syndicated concerts, the Met's Saturday matinee broadcasts and a locally produced weekday afternoon program called Magnum Opus, hosted by Dana Hill, which features works with extended running times, from complete symphonies to oratorios. WUFT Classic also includes late-night jazz on Friday and Saturday nights from PRI. Besides being available on 89.1 HD2, WUFT Classic is also broadcast in Gainesville proper on a low-power FM translator, W274BT at 102.7 FM and on WJUF's second digital sub-channel at 90.1 HD2, as well as WUFQ at 88.5 FM in Cross City.

=== WUFT-FM HD3 ===
WUFT-FM broadcasts a student-run Top 40 music format on its 89.1 HD3 channel called GHQ, which also broadcasts in Gainesville proper on a low-power FM translator, W237EJ at 95.3 FM. However, this station is not available on WJUF. Previously, the HD3 sub-channel broadcast a Latin Top 40 music Spanish language format called "Ritmo Latino". Before that, it aired "WUFT Ahora" with Spanish language news programming from Radio Netherlands Worldwide. In addition to regular music, the station airs specialty shows on weekends, ranging from Latin and hip-hop to EDM.

== Newscasts ==
WUFT presents weekday hourly news updates produced and anchored by broadcasting students at the University of Florida's College of Journalism and Communications. Additional local newscasts can be heard during NPR's Morning Edition (hosted locally by Glenn Richards) and All Things Considered (hosted locally by Dana Hill).

=== News staff ===
The newsroom (a.k.a. UF Innovation News Center) is managed by:

- Ethan Magoc - Director
- Kalisha Whitman - Senior TV News Manager
- Alicia Coleman - TV News Manager
- Dave Barasoain - Audio News Manager
- Dania Alexandrino - Spanish-language News Manager
- Maria Fernanda Camacho - Spanish-language News Manager
- Jeremy St. Louis - Sports Director
