= WZCC =

Coordinates: 29°36′35″N 83°8′3″W

- Cross City, Florida; United States
- Broadcast area: Tri-County area
- Frequency: 1240 kHz
- Branding: Country Legends

Programming
- Format: Classic country

Ownership
- Owner: Suncoast Radio, Inc.
- Sister stations: WLQH, WWCQ

History
- First air date: November 1985
- Former call signs: WMJQ (3/4/08-9/15/08); WYNY (6/5/03-3/4/08); WDFL (12/3/84-6/5/03); WUSW (12/20/82-12/3/84); WDKA (6/28/82-12/20/82)

Technical information
- Licensing authority: FCC
- Facility ID: 73408
- Class: C
- Power: 1,000 watts unlimited
- Transmitter coordinates: 29°36'35" N, 83°8'3" W
- Translator: 96.3 W242CW (Cross City)

Links
- Public license information: Public file; LMS
- Webcast: Listen Live
- Website: Official website

WZCC (1240 AM) is a commercial classic country radio station in Cross City, Florida, broadcasting to the Tri-County area of Dixie, Levy, and Gilchrist counties.

In 2007 the station was sold to WRGO RADIO, LLC. In February 2010 the station was sold to Suncoast Radio, Inc. The station was off the air for most of 2009. WZCC resumed broadcasting on March 5, 2010.

In addition to classic country music WZCC airs NASCAR Sprint Cup Series races from the Motor Racing Network, and local high school football.

On December 1, 2010, WZCC began simulcasting with WLQH AM 940 in Chiefland. In August 2013 WZCC began broadcasting on an FM translator W227AV 93.3 MHz in Newberry; though licensed to Newberry in western Alachua County, the translator did not serve that community, covering instead an area between Chiefland and Fanning Springs from a transmitter along U.S. 19/98 north of Chiefland.

Former logo
