= WAJD =

Radio station in Gainesville, Florida

- Gainesville, Florida; United States
- Broadcast area: Gainesville metropolitan area, Florida
- Frequency: 1390 kHz
- Branding: 98.9 Jamz

Programming
- Format: Urban Contemporary
- Affiliations: Premiere Networks

Ownership
- Owner: Gillen Broadcasting Corporation
- Sister stations: WYKS

History
- First air date: May 31, 1962
- Former call signs: WPUP (1962–1963); WUWU (1963–1971); WAKA (1971–1981); WKGR (1981–1983); WMGI (1983–1986); WDVH (1986–1987)

Technical information
- Licensing authority: FCC
- Facility ID: 24209
- Class: D
- Power: 5,000 watts (day); 51 watts (night)
- Transmitter coordinates: 29°39′56″N 82°17′26″W
- Translator: 98.9 W255CV (Gainesville)

Links
- Public license information: Public file; LMS
- Webcast: Listen live
- Website: www.989jamz.com

WAJD (1390 AM) is a commercial radio station licensed to Gainesville, Florida, United States. It is owned by Gillen Broadcasting Corporation and airs an urban contemporary format. In Gainesville and adjacent communities, programming can also be heard on FM translator W255CV at 98.9 MHz. WAJD calls itself "98.9 Jamz" using the frequency of the FM translator.

The studios and offices are on SW 24th Avenue in Gainesville. WAJD's transmitter is off NE 16th Avenue.

== History ==
The station signed on the air on May 31, 1962. Its original call sign was WPUP and it broadcast a country music format. The station was sold the next year to WUWU Radio, Inc. The new owners changed the call sign to WUWU, adopting the "Woo-Woo" name but retaining the country format.

WUWU was sold to Olivia Broadcasting in 1971. Olivia relaunched the station as WAKA and flipped its format to beautiful music. WAKA began using the slogan "AM 1390, The Only One To Turn To." After an experiment with a Top 40 and oldies hybrid format in 1973, the station returned to beautiful music the next year. In 1978, Nabco, Inc. acquired WAKA and moved it toward a middle of the road (MOR) format of popular adult music. It began calling itself "14K". This was replaced with a Top 40/Modern Rock hybrid format in 1980.

WAKA became adult contemporary WKGR under new owners, Kent Gainesville Radio, in 1981. Kent sold the station to the Sunshine Wireless Company, owners of WYKS FM. WAKA was relaunched as "WMGI Magic 1390" with a smooth jazz and urban adult contemporary format. In 1986, 1390 returned to country music. Its new call letters were WDVH. The smooth jazz/urban AC format moved to 980 kHz (which became WLUS).

1390 was sold to the current owner, Gillen Broadcasting, along with WYKS, for $1.9 million in 1987. The call sign was switched to WAJD. It debuted a new Top 40 format only to flip again that same year to an all-news format as "Newsradio 1390". The station made yet another change to active rock and heavy metal in 1988 before becoming a full simulcast of WYKS in 1990.

In November 2000, the station flipped children's radio. It became a network affiliate of "Radio Disney". But it ran into financial problems and went silent on July 7, 2009.

When it returned in 2010, it had an urban oldies format, which lasted three years. It returned to talk programming for a few years before going silent again in 2014–15. The station returned to the air in 2016, returning to smooth jazz. Then in October 2019, WAJD flipped formats to urban contemporary and hip-hop music as "98.9 Jamz".
