= WRUF-LD =

Television station in Gainesville, Florida

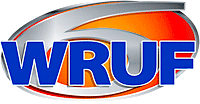
- Gainesville, Florida; United States
- Channels: Digital: 5 (VHF); Virtual: 10
- Branding: WRUF-TV Gator Weather

Programming
- Affiliations: 10.1: Independent/24-hour Weather

Ownership
- Owner: University of Florida; (Board of Trustees, University of Florida)
- Sister stations: WRUF, WRUF-FM, WUFT, WUFT-FM, WUFQ

History
- First air date: November 27, 1989
- Former call signs: W10BR (1989–1995); WLUF-LP (1995–2010); WLUF-LD (2010)
- Former channel numbers: Analog: 10 (VHF, 1989–2010)
- Former affiliations: PBS (1989–2011); PBS You (secondary, 2000–2006)
- Call sign meaning: "Radio from the University of Florida" (from sister radio stations WRUF-AM-FM)

Technical information
- Licensing authority: FCC
- Facility ID: 4200
- Class: LD
- ERP: 0.3 kW
- HAAT: 261.4 m (858 ft)
- Transmitter coordinates: 29°42′34.9″N 82°23′39.4″W

Links
- Public license information: LMS
- Website: ufweather.org

WRUF-LD (channel 10) is a low-power independent television station in Gainesville, Florida, United States. It is owned by the University of Florida alongside PBS member WUFT (channel 5), NPR member WUFT-FM (89.1), emergency-formatted radio station WUFQ (88.5), and commercial radio stations WRUF (850 AM) and WRUF-FM (103.7). The six stations share studios at Weimer Hall on the University's campus; WRUF-LD's transmitter is located on Northwest 53rd Avenue in Gainesville.

On cable, WRUF-LD can be seen on Cox Communications channel 6 in Gainesville; this is reflected in the station's logo. It is also carried on Cox channel 20 in Ocala. Most of WRUF-LD's programming is devoted to local weather, with some news and sports coverage, as well as UF features and happenings.

== History ==
The station's logo as WLUF, used until 2011.

The station was granted a construction permit for analog broadcasting on VHF channel 10 on July 29, 1988 (after having applied for the channel in 1981), and was issued the call sign W10BR; it filed for a license to cover on November 27, 1989, which was granted on December 29. The callsign was changed to WLUF-LP in 1995. As WLUF, it served as a secondary PBS member station, broadcasting mainly repeats of PBS and WUFT programming, plus telecourses for UF students. The station converted to digital broadcasting, becoming WLUF-LD, in 2010.

The station was relaunched as a commercially based 24-hour weather channel on June 1, 2011; this came after state funding to Florida's public radio and television stations was vetoed by Governor Rick Scott in May. The call letters had been changed to WRUF-LD, matching the University of Florida's commercially operated WRUF radio stations (850 AM, and 103.7 FM), on November 19, 2010. Regular WLUF programming ended on May 23, 2011, with WRUF-LD carrying NASA TV's coverage of the final mission of Space Shuttle Endeavour in the interim.

== Subchannel ==
Subchannel of WRUF-LD
| Channel | Res. | Short name | Programming |
|---|---|---|---|
| 10.1 | 1080i | WRUF | Main WRUF-LD programming |

== See also ==
- Channel 5 digital TV stations in the United States
- Channel 5 low-power TV stations in the United States
- Channel 6 branded TV stations in the United States
- Channel 10 virtual TV stations in the United States
