= WTNB-CD =

Television station in Cleveland, Tennessee

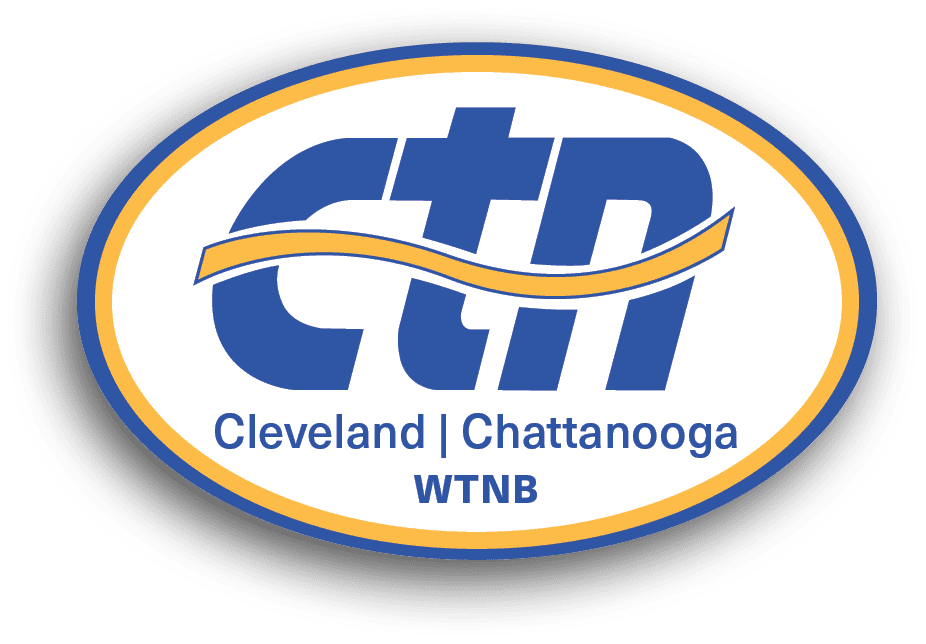
- Cleveland–Chattanooga, Tennessee; United States
- City: Cleveland, Tennessee
- Channels: Digital: 5 (VHF); Virtual: 27

Programming
- Affiliations: 27.1: CTN; for others, see § Subchannels

Ownership
- Owner: Christian Television Network; (Volunteer Christian Television, Inc.)

History
- Founded: December 8, 1994
- First air date: October 1997
- Former call signs: W27BQ (1994–1998); WTNB-LP (1998–2003); WTNB-CA (2003–2015)
- Former channel numbers: Analog: 27 (UHF, 1997–2015); Digital: 27 (UHF, 2015–2019)
- Former affiliations: FamilyNet; My Family TV; Heartland (until 2022)

Technical information
- Licensing authority: FCC
- Facility ID: 49240
- Class: CD
- ERP: 1.67 kW
- HAAT: 245.4 m (805 ft)
- Transmitter coordinates: 35°12′26″N 85°16′52″W

Links
- Public license information: Public file; LMS
- Website: ctnonline.com/affiliate/wtnb/

WTNB-CD (channel 27) is a low-power, Class A religious television station licensed to Cleveland, Tennessee, United States, serving the Chattanooga area. The station is owned by the Christian Television Network (CTN). WTNB-CD's transmitter is located on Sawyer Cemetery Road in unincorporated Mile Straight.

== History ==
A construction permit for a low-power television station on UHF channel 27 in Cleveland was issued on December 8, 1994 under the call sign W27BQ to North Georgia Television. On October 27, 1997, the station filed for a license to cover, which was granted on November 17. The call letters were changed to WTNB-LP on July 1, 1998; on June 12, 2003, the call sign was modified to WTNB-CA, after having been granted class A status on September 10, 2001. Under North Georgia Television, WTNB was a sister station to WDNN-CA and WDGA-CA in Dalton, Georgia; by 2005, WTNB and WDNN programmed similar lineups featuring FamilyNet and local programming, though WTNB's local programming was separate from that on WDNN.

North Georgia Television sold WTNB-CA to PTP Holdings for $350,000 in 2009. After a period off the air, WTNB resumed broadcasting under the new ownership in January 2010 as a My Family TV affiliate. On April 13, 2015, the call sign was modified to WTNB-CD, after converting to digital television in October 2014. In the FCC's incentive auction, WTNB-CD sold its spectrum for $370,099 and elected to move to a low VHF channel; the station was assigned channel 5.

== Subchannels ==
The station's signal is multiplexed:

Subchannels of WTNB-CD
Subchannel	Res.	Short name	Programming
27.1	1080i	WTNB-HD	CTN
27.2	480i	Life	CTN Lifestyle
27.3	480i	CTNi	CTN International
27.4	480i	N2	Newsmax2
27.5	480i	BIZ-TV	Biz TV
