= WRBD (AM) =

Coordinates: 29°40′56.88″N 82°24′47.39″W

- Gainesville, Florida; United States
- Broadcast area: Gainesville-Ocala-Central Florida
- Frequency: 1230 kHz
- Branding: Power 92.1

Programming
- Format: Urban contemporary

Ownership
- Owner: William Johnson; (Urban One Broadcasting Network, LLC)
- Sister stations: WMOP

History
- First air date: February 1948
- Former call signs: WGGG (1947–2023)

Technical information
- Licensing authority: FCC
- Facility ID: 72101
- Class: C
- Power: 1,000 watts unlimited
- Translator: 92.1 W221DX (Gainesville)
- Repeater: 900 WMOP (Ocala)

Links
- Public license information: Public file; LMS
- Webcast: Listen live
- Website: powerstation92.com

WRBD (1230 kHz) is a commercial AM radio station in Gainesville, Florida, broadcasting to the Gainesville-Ocala-Central Florida area. It simulcasts an urban contemporary format with WMOP (900 AM) in Ocala. They are owned by the Urban One Broadcasting Network headed by radio personality William Johnson. (It is not affiliated with Urban One, Inc., based in the Washington, D.C. area.) WRBD has studios and offices on SW 6th Avenue in Ocala.

WRBD is a Class C AM station. It is powered at 1,000 watts. The transmitter tower is on NW 67th Street near NW 35th Avenue in Gainesville. Programming is also heard on 99-watt FM translator W221DX at 92.1 MHz. It uses the translator's frequency for its moniker, "Power 92.1."

== History ==
The station signed on the air in February 1948 as WGGG. It started with 250 watts of power. The station was owned by Alachua County Broadcasting Company. The offices, studios, transmitter and tower were located near the Gainesville Regional Airport at 1230 Waldo Road, northeast of downtown Gainesville.

On November 13, 2017, the station re-branded as The Goat. (Goat stands for the "Greatest of All Time", referring to the top stars of their sport.) WGGG had a sports radio format, airing programming from the CBS Sports Radio Network.

The station flipped to Christmas music from November 2021 until June 2022. It was planning a new format and played the holiday tunes until the new sound was ready.

The station eventually flipped to urban contemporary music in October 2022 under ownership of William Johnson's Urban One Broadcasting Network, LLC. In 2023, it switched its callsign to WRBD.

In 2024, the FCC assigned the WGGG callsign to a new low-power FM radio station on 102.3 MHz in Ossipee, New Hampshire, as WGGG-LP.
