= WUFT (TV) =

Television station in Gainesville, Florida

- Gainesville, Florida; United States
- Channels: Digital: 36 (UHF); Virtual: 5
- Branding: PBS WUFT; WUFT News

Programming
- Affiliations: 5.1: PBS; 5.2: Create; 5.3: The Florida Channel

Ownership
- Owner: University of Florida; (Board of Trustees, University of Florida)
- Sister stations: WUFT-FM, WUFQ, WRUF (AM), WRUF-FM, WRUF-LD

History
- First air date: November 10, 1958
- Former channel numbers: Analog: 5 (VHF, 1958–2009)
- Former affiliations: NET (1958–1970)
- Call sign meaning: University of Florida Television

Technical information
- Licensing authority: FCC
- Facility ID: 69440
- ERP: 1,000 kW
- HAAT: 263 m (863 ft)
- Transmitter coordinates: 29°42′35.4″N 82°23′41.1″W

Links
- Public license information: Public file; LMS
- Website: www.wuft.org

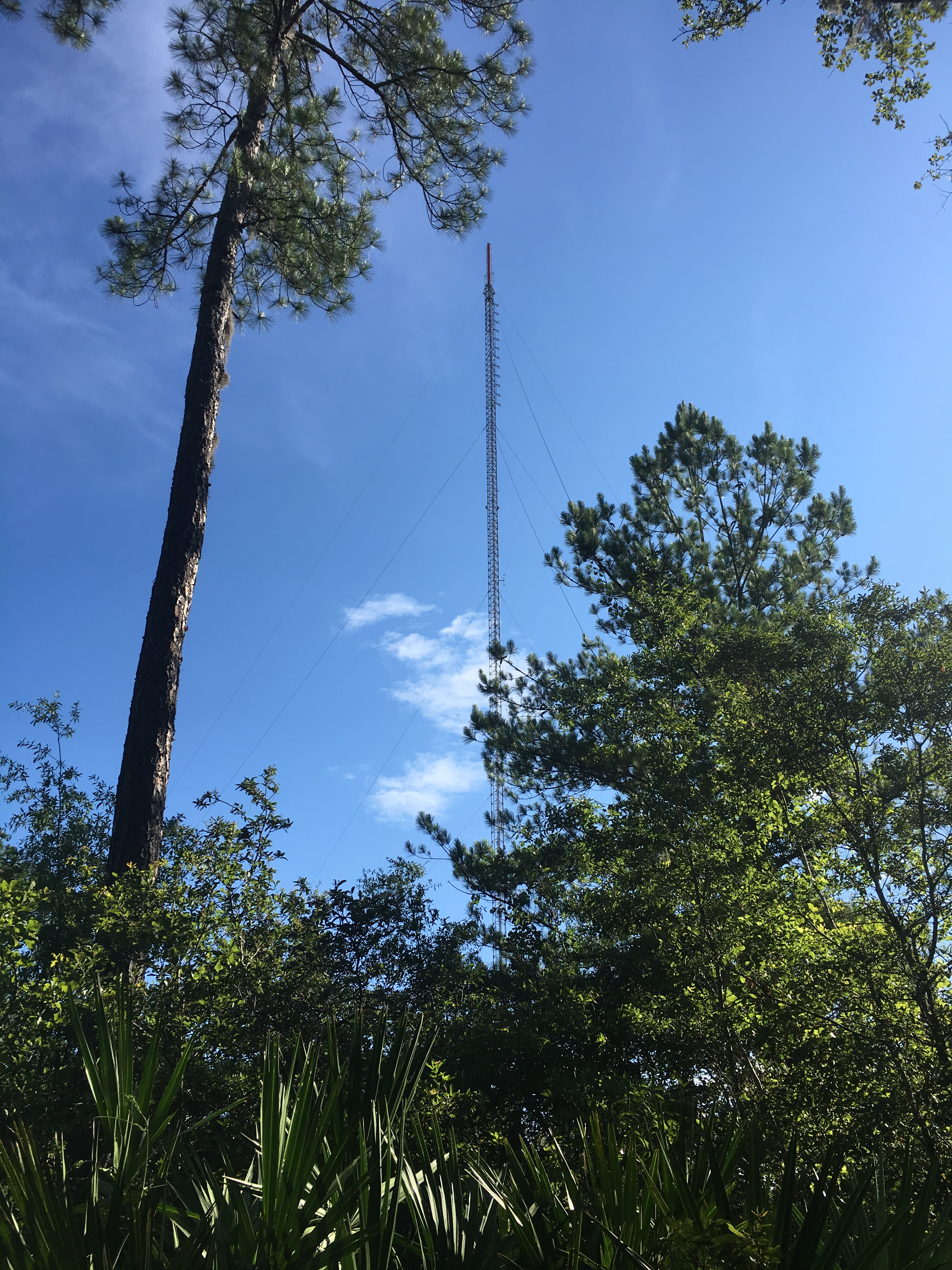
Broadcast transmitter for WUFT in Gainesville, Florida in June 2018

WUFT (channel 5) is a PBS member television station in Gainesville, Florida, United States. It is owned by the University of Florida alongside low-power weather-formatted independent station WRUF-LD (channel 10), NPR member WUFT-FM (89.1), emergency-formatted radio station WUFQ (88.5), and commercial radio stations WRUF (850 AM) and WRUF-FM (103.7). The six stations share studios at Weimer Hall on the university's campus; WUFT's transmitter is located on Northwest 53rd Avenue in Gainesville.

WUFT serves 16 counties in north-central Florida. For decades, it has also been available on cable in Jacksonville, currently on Comcast Xfinity channel 25, providing a second choice for PBS programming alongside WJCT (which signed on two months before WUFT).

== History ==
WUFT first signed on the air with instructional programming on November 10, 1958, becoming the third educational television station in Florida.

The station was a major beneficiary of a quirk in the FCC's plan for allocating stations. In the early days of broadcast television, there were 12 VHF channels available and 69 UHF channels (later reduced to 55 in 1983). The VHF bands were more desirable because they carried longer distances. Since there were only 12 VHF channels available, there were limitations as to how closely the stations could be spaced.

After the FCC's Sixth Report and Order ended the license freeze and opened the UHF band in 1952, it devised a plan for allocating VHF licenses. Under this plan, almost all of the country would be able to receive two commercial VHF channels plus one non-commercial channel. Most of the rest of the country ("1/2") would be able to receive a third VHF channel. Other areas would be designated as "UHF islands" since they were too close to larger cities for VHF service. The "2" networks became CBS and NBC, "+1" represented non-commercial educational stations, and "1/2" became ABC (which was the weakest network usually winding up with the UHF allocation where no VHF was available).

However, what would become the Gainesville market is sandwiched between Jacksonville (channels 4, 7, and 12) to the northeast, Tallahassee (channels 6 and 11) to the northwest, and Orlando (channels 2, 6, and 9) and Tampa Bay (channels 3, 8, 10, and 13) to the south. This created a large "doughnut" in north-central Florida where there could only be one VHF license. WUFT was fortunate enough to gain that license, and as a result, Gainesville became one of the smallest markets with an educational While this move assured north-central Florida would receive educational television (and later PBS), it also meant that the area would have a long wait for commercial television. The VHF channel was already allocated to UF, and UHF was not seen as viable at the time. Gainesville's first commercial television station, WCJB-TV, would not sign on until 1971.

WUFT rebranded in August 2010, calling itself "Florida's 5"; this rebranding lasted until late November 2019, when the station began identifying by its callsign again, in alignment with PBS' 50th-anniversary logo redesign.

=== 2025 transmitter outage ===
On September 25, 2025, WUFT and its subchannels were knocked off the air by a lightning strike that damaged the station's transmitter. The new transmitter was installed a month later, and the channels were restored over-the-air on October 20.

== Newscasts ==
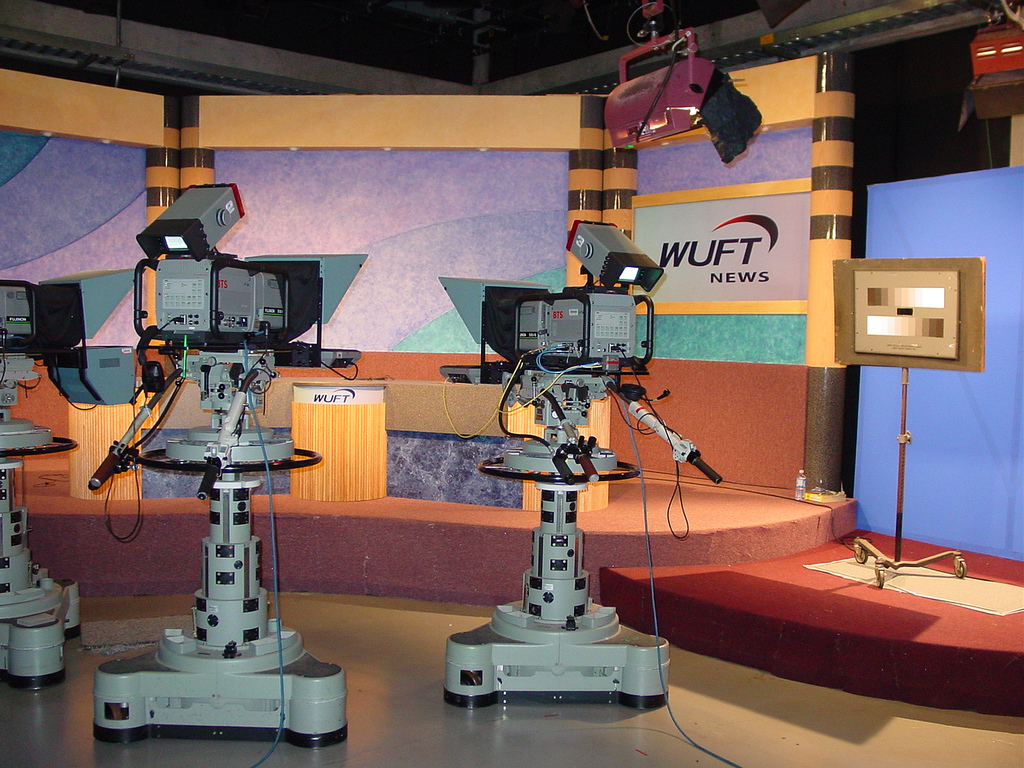
On the set of News 5 (note previous logo)

WUFT-TV broadcasts local newscasts staffed and produced by students in the University of Florida College of Journalism and Communications. WUFT-TV broadcasts two main newscasts, along with a variety of special reports and half-hour specials. First Edition, currently a six-minute newscast, airs weekdays at noon for 100 shows per year. WUFT News – First at 5:00 (the main newscast, formerly known as Report 5 and Evening News) is a half-hour weekday newscast at 5 p.m. which airs 200+ days per year. Starting in the spring of 2014, WUFT-TV added a 6 p.m. newscast, that is also 30 minutes long, but that has since been canceled, leaving just the 5 p.m. news. Before the move to 5 p.m., the newscast used to be on at its long-time home at 5:30 p.m., to possibly avoid competing against ABC affiliate WCJB. When it was moved to 5 p.m., the same reason existed.

== Technical information ==
=== Subchannels ===
The station's signal is multiplexed:

Subchannels of WUFT
Channel	Res.	Short name	Programming
5.1	1080i	WUFT-HD	PBS
5.2	480i	WUFT-2	Create (4:3)
5.3	480i	WUFT-3	The Florida Channel (4:3)

WUFT is the only PBS member station in Florida not to carry the national 24/7 PBS Kids network on one of its subchannels.

=== Analog-to-digital conversion ===
WUFT ended regular programming on its analog signal, over VHF channel 5, on June 12, 2009, the official date on which full-power television stations in the United States transitioned from analog to digital broadcasts under federal mandate. The station's digital signal remained on its pre-transition UHF channel 36, using virtual channel 5.

As part of the SAFER Act, WUFT kept its analog signal on the air until June 29 to inform viewers of the digital television transition through a loop of public service announcements from the National Association of Broadcasters.
