= Anthony, Florida =

Unincorporated community in Florida, U.S.

- Unincorporated Community
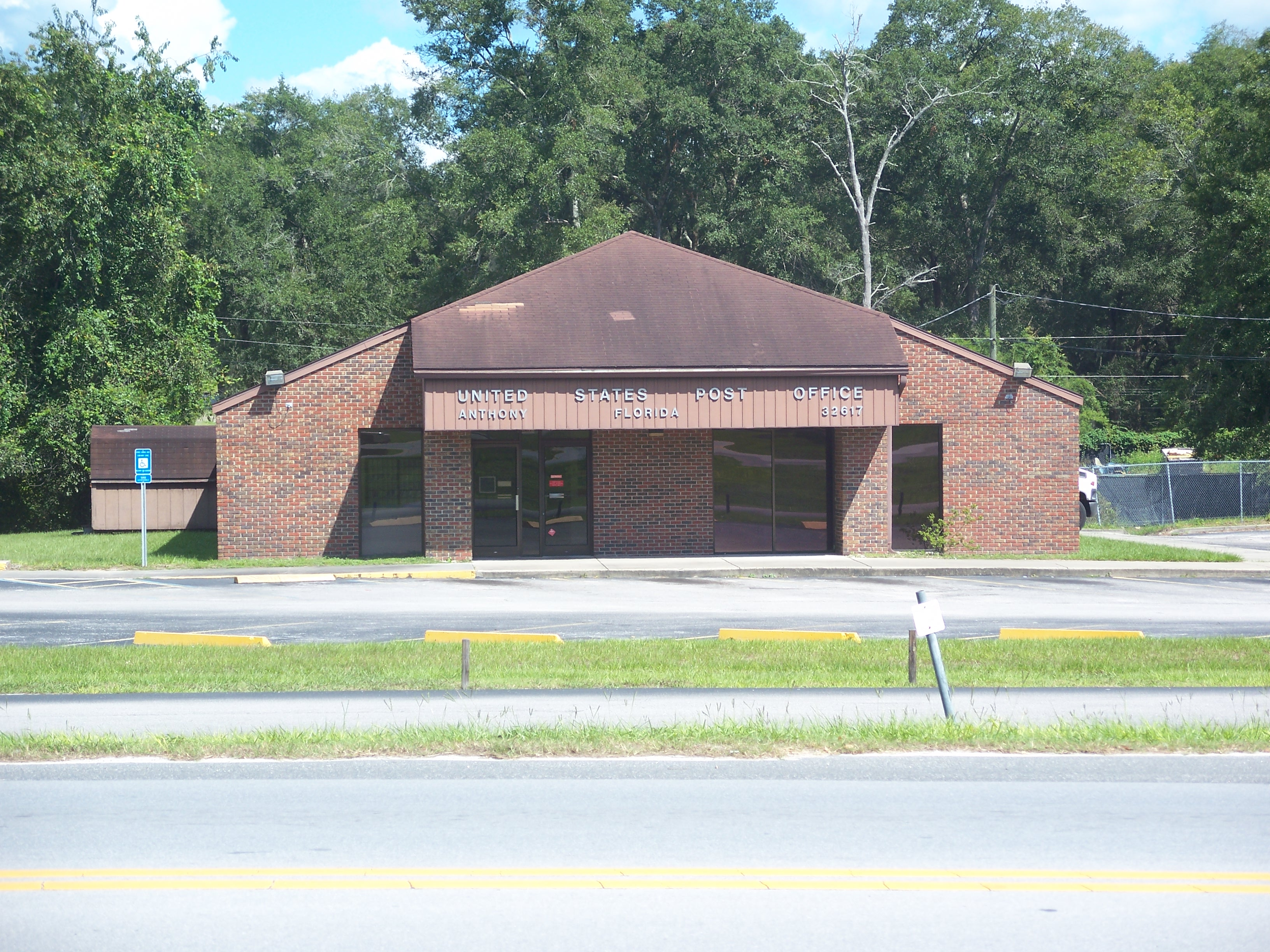
- The Anthony post office
- Interactive map of Anthony, Florida
- Location within the state of Florida Anthony, Florida (the United States)
- Coordinates: 29°17′22″N 82°06′42″W
- Country: United States
- State: Florida
- County: Marion
- ZIP Code: 32617

Anthony is an unincorporated community in Marion County, Florida, United States. It is located on County Road 200A (Jacksonville Road). The community is part of the Ocala Metropolitan Statistical Area. Anthony has a post office with ZIP code 32617. Anthony is considered to be in the Ocala “woods area” “horse country;” it is near horse farms and equestrian facilities and events including Horse Shows in the Sun (HITS) and Ocala Breeders’ Sales (OBS).

== History ==
A post office has been in operation at Anthony since 1877. Anthony was platted in 1883 when the railroad was extended to that point. The community is named after one of its founders, E. C. Anthony. Anthony was incorporated in 1892 during the time phosphate was mined in the area. During economic strain brought on by the Great Depression and pressures of financing roads, the town was disincorporated in 1932.
