= WBVM =

Christian radio station in Tampa, Florida

Coordinates: 27.848°N 82.264°W

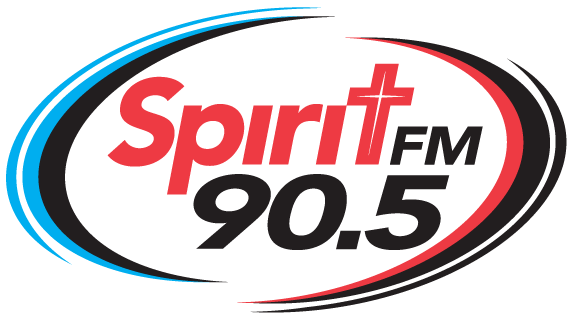
- Tampa, Florida; United States
- Broadcast area: Tampa Bay and Sarasota-Bradenton metropolitan areas
- Frequency: 90.5 MHz (HD Radio)
- Branding: Spirit FM 90.5

Programming
- Format: Christian adult contemporary
- Subchannels: HD2: Christian radio (The Light); HD3: Spanish CCM (El Fuego)

Ownership
- Owner: Roman Catholic Diocese of Saint Petersburg; (Bishop of the Diocese of St. Petersburg)

History
- First air date: May 26, 1986
- Call sign meaning: W Blessed Virgin Mary

Technical information
- Licensing authority: FCC
- Facility ID: 5373
- Class: C1
- ERP: 100,000 watts
- HAAT: 262 meters (860 ft)

Links
- Public license information: Public file; LMS
- Webcast: Listen Live; Listen Live (HD2); Listen Live (HD3)
- Website: www.myspiritfm.com

WBVM (90.5 FM, "Spirit FM 90.5") is a Christian radio station licensed to Tampa, Florida. Owned by the Roman Catholic Diocese of Saint Petersburg, the station broadcasts a Christian adult contemporary music format serving the Tampa Bay Area. The station's studios are currently located at 717 S. Dale Mabry Highway in Tampa, and the station's transmitter is located in Riverview. WBVM is primarily listener-supported through donations, with annual pledge drives such as "Spread the Word", "Hopesgiving", and "Thrill of Hope".

The station's programming includes Christian music, along with programs featuring local diocesan speakers, the Saturday morning children's program Kid's Kingdom with Elle, community features on How We See It, and even Bishop Parkes himself with A View from the Top. Some syndicated programs are carried, such as Focus on the Family Minute, Divine Mercy Chaplet, and Lighthouse Catholic Media. Sacred Classics, a weekly program of traditional choral and organ music, originates from the station. WBVM broadcasts two HD Radio subchannels, including The Light (which carries additional Christian programming), and the Spanish-language El Fuego.

Spirit FM also hosts an annual Women's Conference, available to all women across the Diocese of St. Petersburg. The station often brings nationally renowned speakers and artists to this conference.

In 2018, Spirit FM also had in integral role in hosting the Family Faith Fest, alongside The Diocese of St. Petersburg, sponsored by BayCare.

Programming from WBVM was simulcast on WWLC, 88.5 MHz, in Cross City, Florida, owned by the neighboring Roman Catholic Diocese of St. Augustine. In 2012, WBVM received the Gabriel Award as best Religious Radio Station of the Year by the Catholic Academy for Communication Arts Professionals. It also received a Gabriel Award in the category Best Ecumenical or Interreligious Program for Local Release.
