= WTJX-TV =

Television station in Charlotte Amalie, U.S. Virgin Islands

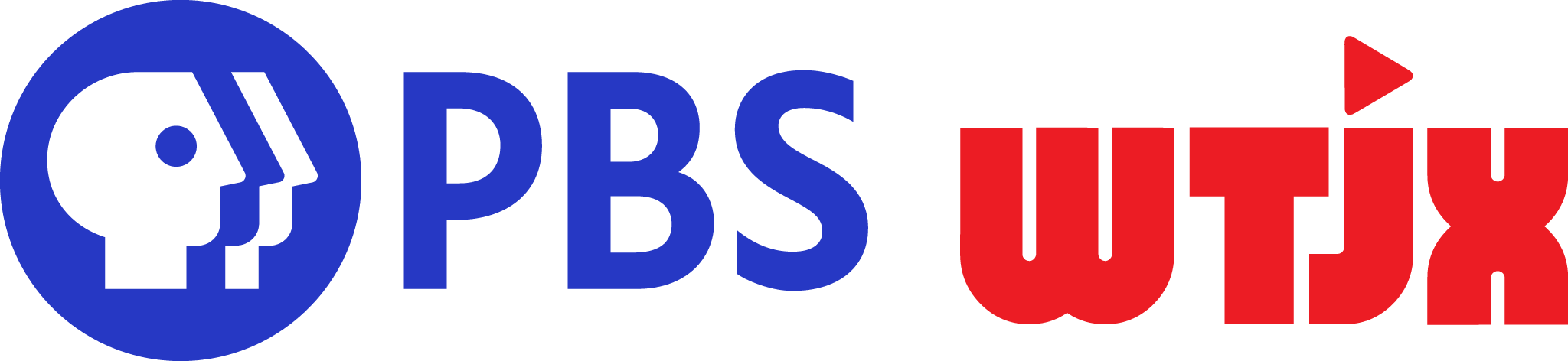
- Charlotte Amalie; United States Virgin Islands
- Channels: Digital: 36 (UHF); Virtual: 12
- Branding: PBS WTJX

Programming
- Affiliations: 12.1: PBS; 12.2: PBS Kids; 12.3: WTJX Business

Ownership
- Owner: Virgin Islands Public Broadcasting System
- Sister stations: WTJX-FM

History
- Founded: 1968
- First air date: August 29, 1972
- Former channel numbers: Analog: 12 (VHF, 1972–2009); Digital: 44 (UHF, 2003–2018)
- Call sign meaning: St. Thomas; St. John; St. Croix

Technical information
- Licensing authority: FCC
- Facility ID: 70287
- ERP: 42.9 kW
- HAAT: 505.6 m (1,659 ft)
- Transmitter coordinates: 18°21′20.8″N 64°56′51.5″W
- Translator(s): W05AW-D Christiansted

Links
- Public license information: Public file; LMS
- Website: www.wtjx.org

WTJX-TV (channel 12) is a PBS member television station serving the United States Virgin Islands that is licensed to Charlotte Amalie, Saint Thomas. Owned by the Virgin Islands Public Broadcasting System, it is sister to NPR member WTJX-FM (93.1 MHz). The two stations share studios on Haypiece Hill in Charlotte Amalie; WTJX-TV's transmitter is located on Signal Hill.

WTJX-TV also operates a translator facility in Christiansted on Saint Croix: W05AW-D on VHF channel 5. In July 2007, WTJX St. Croix moved to a larger facility, with a full studio, control room, and editing bays.

The station has also created its own mascot, "Langford the Lizard", primarily displayed on their website.

== History ==
WTJX-TV launched on August 29, 1972. Before its launch, Sesame Street was carried by commercial outlet WSVI-TV, a practice similar to certain markets in the U.S. mainland where PBS stations had not launched yet. In July 1972, WTJX-TV had fixed its schedule in anticipation for the opening of its facilities. With the start of the fall season of programming in October 1972, the station started carrying public affairs programs from PBS during prime time hours.

WTJX was building a low-power relay on St. Croix in November 1978, facing stiff competition from ZBTV from Tortola, which broadcast on channel 5—the same frequency as the relay WTJX wanted to build. WTJX opposed a petition from ZBTV on the grounds that a foreign company did not have the superior right to serve U.S. citizens—those of the USVI.

WTJX-TV ended regular programming on its analog signal, over VHF channel 12, on June 12, 2009, the official date on which full-power television stations in the United States transitioned from analog to digital broadcasts under federal mandate. As part of the SAFER Act, WTJX kept its analog signal on the air until July 12 to inform viewers of the digital television transition through a loop of public service announcements from the National Association of Broadcasters.

== Subchannels ==
The station's signal is multiplexed:

Subchannels of WTJX-TV
Channel	Res.	Short name	Programming
12.1	1080i	WTJX-1	PBS
12.2	480i	WTJX-2	PBS Kids (4:3)
12.3	480i	WTJX-3	WTJX Business (4:3)
