= WNDD (FM) =

Radio station in Alachua, Florida

Simulcast of WYND-FM, Silver Springs
- Alachua, Florida; United States
- Broadcast area: Gainesville metropolitan area
- Frequency: 92.5 MHz (HD Radio)
- Branding: Wind-FM

Programming
- Format: Classic rock
- Affiliations: Compass Media Networks; United Stations Radio Networks

Ownership
- Owner: Saga Communications; (Saga South Communications, LLC)
- Sister stations: WOGK; WYND-FM

History
- First air date: 1996
- Former call signs: WFJZ (1994–1996, CP); WNDT (1996–2019)
- Call sign meaning: Wind

Technical information
- Licensing authority: FCC
- Facility ID: 737
- Class: A
- ERP: 3,200 watts
- HAAT: 135 meters (443 ft)
- Transmitter coordinates: 29.740°N 82.386°W

Links
- Public license information: Public file; LMS
- Webcast: Listen live
- Website: www.windfm.com

WNDD (92.5 FM, "Wind FM") is a commercial radio station licensed to Alachua, Florida, United States, and broadcasting to the Gainesville metropolitan area of Central Florida. WNDD and sister station WYND-FM simulcast a classic rock format, and are owned by Saga Communications with studios and offices on East Fort King Street in Ocala.

WNDD's transmitter is sited on NW 13th Street (U.S. Route 441) at NW 93rd Avenue in Alachua. WNDD covers the Gainesville area of the Gainesville-Ocala market, while WYND-FM covers the Ocala area.

== History ==
The station signed on the air in 1996. Its call sign was WNDT and it was owned by the Ocean Broadcasting Company.

On October 30, 2018, it was announced that Dix Communications would sell WDNT, WNDD, WNDN and WOGK to Saga Communications for $9.3 million.

In 2019, it made a slight change to its call letters, becoming WNDD.
