= WWCQ =

- Chiefland, Florida; United States
- Broadcast area: Gainesville-Ocala
- Frequency: 107.9 MHz
- Branding: Classic Rock 107.9

Programming
- Format: Classic rock
- Affiliations: Compass Media Networks; United Stations Radio Networks

Ownership
- Owner: Suncoast Radio
- Sister stations: WLQH, WZCC

History
- First air date: 1991 (as WLQH-FM)
- Former call signs: WLQH-FM (1991–2000); WNDN (2000–2024)

Technical information
- Licensing authority: FCC
- Facility ID: 72201
- Class: A
- ERP: 6,000 watts
- HAAT: 100 meters (330 ft)
- Transmitter coordinates: 29.515°N 82.885°W

Links
- Public license information: Public file; LMS
- Webcast: Listen live
- Website: suncoastradio.com

WWCQ (107.9 FM, "Classic Rock 107.9") is a commercial radio station licensed to Chiefland, Florida, United States, broadcasting to the Gainesville-Ocala radio market. WWCQ airs a classic rock format and is owned by Suncoast Radio. The studios are in Palm Harbor and the transmitter is sited off Old Fannin Road near U.S. Route 19 in Chiefland.

== History ==
The station signed on the air in 1991. Its original call sign was WLQH-FM. It switched call letters to WNDN in 2000.

On June 1, 2024, WNDN rebranded as "Classic Rock 107.9" under new WWCQ call letters after Suncoast Radio closed on the sale of the station from Saga Communications.
