= WSVI =

Television station in Christiansted, U.S. Virgin Islands

WSVI and WZVI

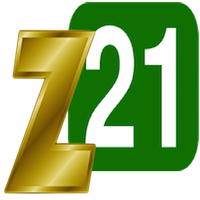

WSVI: Christiansted; WZVI: Charlotte Amalie; United States Virgin Islands
- Channels for WSVI: Digital: 20 (UHF); Virtual: 8
- Channels for WZVI: Digital: 21 (UHF); Virtual: 21
- Branding: VITN Channel 8 (WSVI); Z21 (WZVI)

Programming
- Affiliations: 8.1: Independent with Ion; for others, see § Subchannels

Ownership
- Owner: Atlas News and Information Services Inc.; (Alpha Broadcasting Corporation)

History
- Founded: WZVI: May 17, 2001
- First air date: WSVI: November 10, 1965; WZVI: August 5, 2004
- Former channel number: WSVI: Analog: 8 (VHF, 1965–2009); WZVI: Digital: 43 (UHF, 2004–2018); Virtual: 43 (2004–2018 and 2019–2020), 21 (2018−2019)
- Former affiliations: WSVI: ABC (1965–2015); WZVI: ABC (2004–2015)
- Call sign meaning: WSVI: United States Virgin Islands; WZVI: WSVI 2 (represented with "Z"), Virgin Islands

Technical information
- Licensing authority: FCC
- Facility ID: WSVI: 2370; WZVI: 83270
- ERP: WSVI: 1.1 kW; WZVI: 6 kW
- HAAT: WSVI: 290 m (951 ft); WZVI: 322.6 m (1,058 ft)
- Transmitter coordinates: WSVI: 17°45′13.7″N 64°47′54.5″W; WZVI: 18°19′47.7″N 64°54′38.2″W
- Translator: W05DP-D Charlotte Amalie

Links
- Public license information: WSVI: Public file; LMS; WZVI: Public file; LMS
- Website: www.asseenonchannel8.com/WSVI-TV/

WSVI (channel 8) is a television station licensed to Christiansted, Saint Croix, serving the United States Virgin Islands. It primarily operates as an independent station, but airs some programming from Ion Television. Owned by Atlas News and Information Services, WSVI has studios at the Sunny Isle Shopping Center on Queen Mary Highway in Christiansted, and its transmitter is located on Blue Mountain.

WZVI (channel 21) in Charlotte Amalie, Saint Thomas, operates as a satellite station of WSVI, with transmitter on Flag Hill. The two stations are collectively branded as the Virgin Islands Television Network.

== History ==
WSVI signed on as an ABC affiliate on November 10, 1965. During its ABC affiliation, WSVI signed off nightly at 2 a.m. AST (1 a.m. AST March to November), but the station now carries a 24-hour schedule. During non-network programming time, WSVI carried paid programming, Caribbean Lottery drawings, some local arts and events programming, and their weeknight-only local newscasts, as the U.S. Virgin Islands receives other broadcast networks and superstations from the mainland United States via cable and satellite. The need for WSVI to maintain a full broadcast schedule of syndicated programming outside of network hours for island residents and tourists was thus negated, since the aforementioned stations usually contain that syndicated programming in their schedules.

The station has had multiple ownership changes. Antilles Broadcasting Corp. sold WSVI to Group III Inc. for $4 million in late 1986. In April 2011, WSVI's former owner, the Figgie Family Equity Fund, agreed to sell the station to Atlas News and Information Services of Las Vegas, Nevada, pending approval from the Federal Communications Commission (FCC).

On January 1, 2016, WSVI became an independent station with a secondary Ion Television affiliation after 50 years of being an ABC affiliate; it consequently became one of the few stations to have switched their affiliation from a Big Four-affiliated network to a minor television network. WSVI told the Virgin Islands Daily News that it had declined to renew its contract with ABC at the beginning of 2016, although other local reports indicated that ABC was threatening to remove its programming due to the station's low ratings and technical issues. ABC then entered into an agreement with Lilly Broadcasting, which feeds CBS affiliate WSEE-TV in Erie, Pennsylvania, to pay television vendors in the Caribbean, to also provide its programming to the region, via its WENY-TV in Elmira, New York. ABC also stated to the Daily News that its programming would be seen on WCVI-TV, which claimed not to have knowledge of any arrangement at the time. Lilly subsequently leased WCVI-TV's second subchannel for its ABC programming later in 2016.

WSVI and WZVI's transmitting facilities were heavily damaged when Hurricane Maria struck the Virgin Islands on September 20, 2017. The Telecommunications Act of 1996 requires the stations' licenses be deleted after one year of continuous silence, although WSVI received an extension granted by the FCC to Caribbean stations affected by Maria and Hurricane Irma. The stations' facilities were rebuilt and on the air in September 2019.

== Programming ==
WSVI previously carried most of the Ion schedule in pattern, but now heavily preempts a large portion of the schedule with local programming, newscasts, public affairs shows, and infomercials. The station airs three hours of newscasts each weekday, two hours on Saturdays, and one hour on Sundays. In addition, the station airs Channel 8 Virgin Islands Holiday Program for five hours on Sundays.

== Technical information ==
=== Subchannels ===
The stations' signals are multiplexed:

Subchannels of WSVI and WZVI
Subchannel		Res.	Short name		Programming
WSVI	WZVI	Res.	WSVI	WZVI	Programming
8.1		480i	WSVI		Main WSVI programming (4:3)
8.2	21.1	480i	WSVI	WZVI	Channel 8 International (4:3)
8.3		480i	WSVI		TheWord.TV (Note: WSVI-DT3 and WZVI-DT3 carry an independent feed of religious programming known under the umbrella branding of "TheWord.tv". It holds no relation or affiliation with the mainland's The Word Network.) (4:3)
8.4		480i	WSVI		Tracking the Tropics (4:3)

=== Analog-to-digital conversion ===
WSVI shut down its analog signal, over VHF channel 8, on June 12, 2009, the official date on which full-power television stations in the United States transitioned from analog to digital broadcasts under federal mandate. The station's digital signal remained on its pre-transition UHF channel 20, using virtual channel 8.
