= List of Orlando Magic broadcasters =

Matches played by the American basketball team Orlando Magic have been broadcast since its founding in 1989. Radio commentaries have been broadcast on the WDBO channel, and matches have been televised on Fox Sports Florida and its predecessors. The teams of commentators include a play-by-play commentator, a color commentator, a courtside reporter, and a studio host.

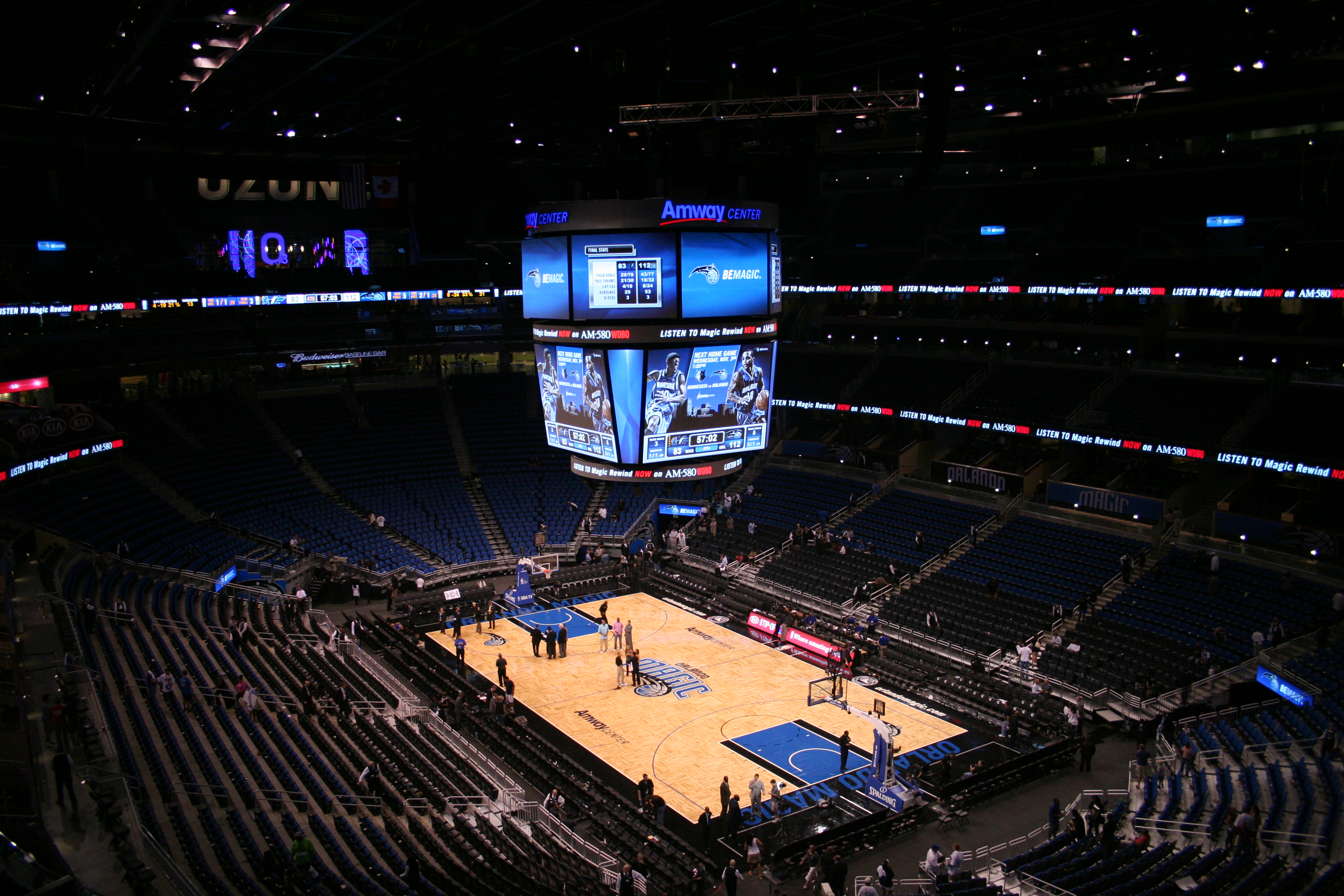
The Orlando Magic court at Amway Center

== Television ==
=== 2020s ===
Year	Channel	Play-by-play	Color commentator(s)	Courtside reporter	Studio host
2019–20	Fox Sports Florida	David Steele	Jeff Turner	Paul Kennedy or Dante Marchitelli	Paul Kennedy

=== 2010s ===
Year	Channel	Play-by-play	Color commentator(s)	Courtside reporter	Studio host
2018–19	Fox Sports Florida	David Steele	Jeff Turner	Paul Kennedy	Paul Kennedy
2017–18	Fox Sports Florida	David Steele	Jeff Turner	Paul Kennedy	Paul Kennedy
2016–17	Fox Sports Florida	David Steele	Jeff Turner	Paul Kennedy	Paul Kennedy
2015–16	Fox Sports Florida	David Steele	Jeff Turner	Paul Kennedy	Paul Kennedy
2014–15	Fox Sports Florida	David Steele	Jeff Turner	Paul Kennedy	Paul Kennedy
2013–14	Fox Sports Florida	David Steele	Jeff Turner	Paul Kennedy	Paul Kennedy
2012–13	Fox Sports Florida	David Steele	Matt Guokas	Paul Kennedy	Paul Kennedy
2011–12	Fox Sports Florida and Sun Sports	David Steele	Matt Guokas	Paul Kennedy	Paul Kennedy
2010–11	Fox Sports Florida and Sun Sports	David Steele	Matt Guokas	Jessica Blaylock or Paul Kennedy	Jessica Blaylock or Paul Kennedy
2009–10	Fox Sports Florida and Sun Sports	David Steele	Matt Guokas	Paul Kennedy	Paul Kennedy

=== 2000s ===
Year	Channel	Play-by-play	Color commentator(s)	Courtside reporter	Studio host
2008–09	Fox Sports Florida and Sun Sports	David Steele	Matt Guokas	Paul Kennedy	Paul Kennedy
2007–08	FSN Florida and Sun Sports	David Steele	Matt Guokas	Paul Kennedy	Paul Kennedy
2006–07	FSN Florida, Sun Sports and WRBW	David Steele	Matt Guokas	Paul Kennedy	Paul Kennedy
2005–06	FSN Florida, Sun Sports and WRBW	David Steele	Matt Guokas	Paul Kennedy	Paul Kennedy
2004–05	FSN Florida, Sunshine Network/Sun Sports and WRBW	David Steele	Matt Guokas	Paul Kennedy	Paul Kennedy
2003–04	Fox Sports Net Florida, Sunshine Network and WRBW	David Steele	Jack Givens	Paul Kennedy	Whit Watson
2002–03	Fox Sports Net Florida, Sunshine Network and WRBW	David Steele	Jack Givens	Paul Kennedy	Paul Kennedy
2001–02	Fox Sports Net Florida, Sunshine Network and WRBW	David Steele	Jack Givens	Paul Kennedy	Paul Kennedy
2000–01	Fox Sports Net Florida, Sunshine Network and WRBW	David Steele	Jack Givens	Paul Kennedy	Paul Kennedy
1999–2000	SportsChannel Florida, Sunshine Network and WRBW	David Steele	Jack Givens	Paul Kennedy	Paul Kennedy

=== 1990s ===
Year	Channel	Play-by-play	Color commentator(s)	Courtside reporter	Studio host
1998–99	SportsChannel Florida, Sunshine Network and WKCF	David Steele	Jack Givens	Paul Kennedy	Paul Kennedy
1997–98	SportsChannel Florida, Sunshine Network and WKCF	Chip Caray	Jack Givens	Paul Kennedy	Paul Kennedy
1996–97	SportsChannel Florida, Sunshine Network and WKCF	Chip Caray	Jack Givens	Paul Kennedy	Paul Kennedy
1995–96	SportsChannel Florida, Sunshine Network and WKCF	Chip Caray	Jack Givens	Paul Kennedy	Paul Kennedy
1994–95	SportsChannel Florida, Sunshine Network and WKCF	Chip Caray	Jack Givens	Paul Kennedy	Paul Kennedy
1993–94	SportsChannel Florida, Sunshine Network and WKCF	Chip Caray	Jack Givens	Paul Kennedy	Paul Kennedy
1992–93	SportsChannel Florida, Sunshine Network and WKCF	Chip Caray	Jack Givens	Paul Kennedy	Paul Kennedy
1991–92	SportsChannel Florida, Sunshine Network and WKCF	Chip Caray	Jack Givens	Paul Kennedy	Paul Kennedy
1990–91	SportsChannel Florida, Sunshine Network and WKCF	Chip Caray	Jack Givens	Paul Kennedy	Paul Kennedy
1989–90	SportsChannel Florida, Sunshine Network and WKCF	Chip Caray	Jack Givens	Paul Kennedy	Paul Kennedy

== Radio ==
=== 2020s ===
Year	Flagship Station	Play-by-play	Color commentator	Studio Host
2019–20	WYGM	Dennis Neumann	Richie Adubato	Scott Anez

=== 2010s ===
Year	Flagship Station	Play-by-play	Color commentator	Studio Host
2018–19	WYGM	Dennis Neumann	Richie Adubato	Scott Anez
2017–18	WDBO	Dennis Neumann	Richie Adubato	Scott Anez
2016–17	WDBO	Dennis Neumann	Richie Adubato	Scott Anez
2015–16	WDBO	Dennis Neumann	Richie Adubato	Scott Anez
2014–15	WDBO	Dennis Neumann	Richie Adubato	Scott Anez
2013–14	WDBO	Dennis Neumann	Richie Adubato	Scott Anez
2012–13	WDBO	Dennis Neumann	Richie Adubato	Scott Anez
2011–12	WDBO	Dennis Neumann	Richie Adubato	Scott Anez
2010–11	WDBO	Dennis Neumann	Richie Adubato	Scott Anez
2009–10	WDBO	Dennis Neumann	Richie Adubato	Scott Anez

=== 2000s ===
Year	Flagship Station	Play-by-play	Color commentator	Studio Host
2008–09	WDBO	Dennis Neumann	Richie Adubato	Scott Anez
2007–08	WDBO	Dennis Neumann	Richie Adubato	Scott Anez
2006–07	WDBO	Dennis Neumann	Richie Adubato (Home) or Will Perdue (Road)	Scott Anez
2005–06	WDBO	Dennis Neumann	Richie Adubato (Home) or Will Perdue (Road)	Scott Anez
2004–05	WDBO	Dennis Neumann	Jeff Turner (Home) or Will Perdue (Road)	Scott Anez
2003–04	WDBO	Dennis Neumann	Jeff Turner (Home) or Will Perdue (Road)	Scott Anez
2002–03	WDBO	Dennis Neumann	Jeff Turner (Home) or Will Perdue (Road)	
2001–02	WDBO	Dennis Neumann	Jeff Turner	
2000–01	WDBO	Dennis Neumann	Jeff Turner	
1999–2000	WDBO	Dennis Neumann	Jeff Turner	

=== 1990s ===
Year	Flagship Station	Play-by-play	Color commentator	Studio Host
1998–99	WDBO	Dennis Neumann	Jeff Turner	
1997–98	WDBO	David Steele	Jeff Turner	
1996–97	WDBO	David Steele	Jeff Turner	Whit Watson
1995–96	WDBO	David Steele	Jeff Turner	Whit Watson
1994–95	WDBO	David Steele		Whit Watson
1993–94	WDBO	David Steele		Whit Watson
1992–93	WDBO	David Steele		
1991–92	WWZN	David Steele		
1990–91	WWZN	David Steele		
1989–90	WWZN	David Steele		

== See also ==
- List of current National Basketball Association broadcasters
