= WDYZ =

WDYZ may refer to:

- WDYZ (AM), a radio station (660 AM) licensed to Altamonte Springs, Florida, United States
- WORL (AM), a radio station (950 AM) licensed to Orlando, Florida, United States, which held the call sign WDYZ in August 2019
- WTLN (AM), a radio station (990 AM) licensed to Orlando, Florida, which held the call sign WDYZ from 2001 to 2019
- WWRI, a radio station (1450 AM) licensed to West Warwick, Rhode Island, United States, which held the call sign WDYZ from 1998 to 2000
