= WDBO =

WDBO may refer to the following radio or TV stations licensed to Orlando, Florida, United States:

- WDBO (AM), a radio station (580 AM)
- WOEX, a radio station (96.5 FM), which held the call sign WDBO-FM from 2011 to 2020
  - WWKA, a radio station (92.3 FM), that originally used the WDBO-FM call sign until 1982.
- WKMG-TV, a television station (virtual channel 6), which held the call sign WDBO-TV from 1954 to 1982
