= WTLN =

WTLN may refer to:

- WTLN (AM), a radio station (990 AM) licensed to Orlando, Florida, United States
- WORL (AM), a radio station (950 AM) licensed to Orlando, Florida, which held the call sign WTLN from 1998 to 2019
- WPYO, a radio station (95.3 FM) licensed to Maitland, Florida, which held the call sign WTLN-FM from 1965 to 1999
- WNDO, a radio station (1520 AM) licensed to Apopka, Florida, which held the call sign WTLN from 1963 to 1998
