= WORL =

WORL may refer to:

- WORL (AM), a radio station (950 AM) licensed to Orlando, Florida, United States
- WDYZ (AM), a radio station (660 AM) licensed to Altamonte Springs, Florida, United States, which held the call sign WORL from 1989 to 2019
- WIWA (AM), a radio station (1270 AM) licensed to Eatonville, Florida, United States, which held the call sign WORL from 1971 to 1988
- WROL, a radio station (950 AM) licensed to Boston, Massachusetts, United States, which held the call sign WORL from 1935 to 1966
