= Shannon Burke =

Shannon Burke may refer to:

- Shannon Burke, host of the Shannon Burke Show, a radio show on WTKS Real Radio in Orlando, Florida
- Shannon Burke (writer) (born 1966), American novelist and screenwriter
