= Whit Watson =

American sportscaster (born 1971)

Whit Watson (born 1971 in Winter Park, FL) is an American sportscaster. He currently works for Golf Channel, hired in August 2010. At Golf Channel, Watson is primarily assigned to Golf Central as a studio anchor, but also reports from the field at PGA Tour events, LPGA Tour events, and USGA events. He has also appeared on Golf Channel's Morning Drive program, and has acted as a play-by-play announcer for Golf Channel's European Tour coverage.

== Career ==
Prior to that position, Watson was a primary host for Sun Sports and Fox Sports Florida, the Florida-based regional cable networks owned and operated by Fox Television. He joined the network in August 2003 after nearly seven years at ESPN in Bristol, Connecticut. At ESPN, Watson hosted a variety of programs, including SportsCenter, RPM 2Night, NBA 2Night, and shifts on ESPNEWS, in addition to filling in on ESPN Radio. Prior to working for ESPN, Watson was a television producer and radio reporter for the Orlando Magic from 1993 through 1997.

At Sun Sports and Fox Sports Florida, Watson served a variety of roles, including hosting pregame shows and ancillary programming for the Tampa Bay Rays, Orlando Magic, and Tampa Bay Lightning. He also served as the primary studio host for several original productions, including the pregame and postgame shows for University of Florida and Florida State University football games. Watson was the first host of In My Own Words, a show that was created in Orlando and subsequently adopted by other Fox Television-owned regional sports networks around the country.

Watson also served as the primary play-by-play announcer for the FHSAA high school football and basketball state championship games, and called University of Florida and Florida State University basketball and football games.

While still a FOX employee, Watson freelanced as a studio host for ESPN Regional Television in Charlotte, NC, introducing college basketball games on the syndicated SEC Network package.

Watson is a Florida native who graduated from Trinity Preparatory School in Winter Park, FL in 1989 and later went on to graduate from Cornell University in 1993, where he spent four years as a radio announcer for WVBR. At Cornell University, he was both a National Merit Scholar and Cornell National Scholar, the latter being the highest honor bestowed upon incoming freshmen. He majored in English at Cornell, with a concentration in Communications, and graduated "with distinction" from Cornell's College of Arts and Sciences.

In 2007, Whit Watson was honored as the Distinguished Alumni Award winner at Trinity Preparatory School. He is a member of the school's Athletic Hall of Fame, and currently serves on the board of trustees. He was an All-Conference second baseman and catcher on Trinity Prep's baseball team, while also lettering in Cross-Country and serving as President of the school's Student Council.

He currently resides in his hometown of Winter Park, FL with his wife and two children.
