= Jack Givens =

American basketball player (born 1956)

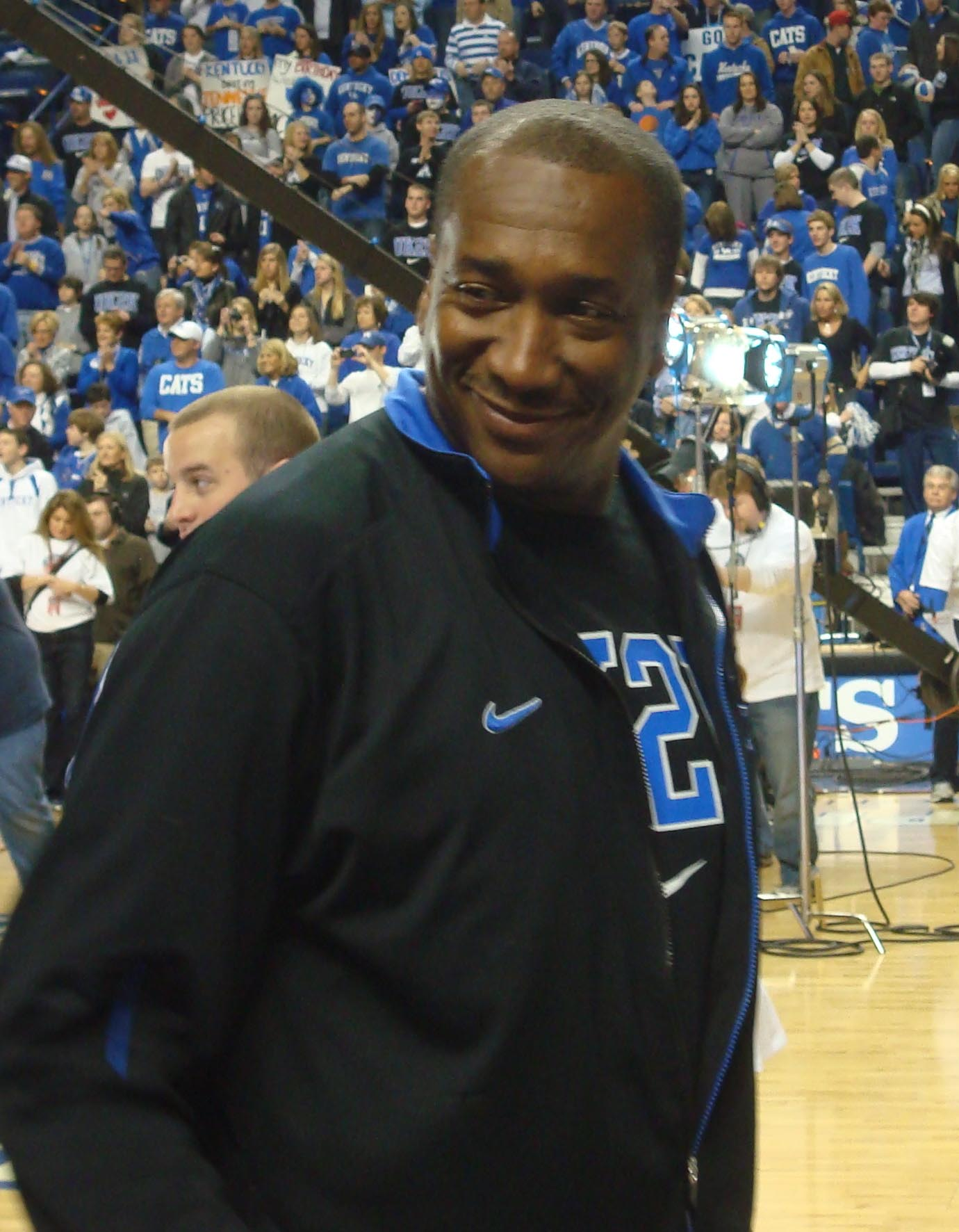
- Givens in 2010

Personal information
- Born: September 21, 1956 (age 70) Lexington, Kentucky, U.S.
- Listed height: 6 ft 5 in (1.96 m)
- Listed weight: 205 lb (93 kg)

Career information
- High school: Bryan Station (Lexington, Kentucky)
- College: Kentucky (1974–1978)
- NBA draft: 1978: 1st round, 16th overall pick
- Drafted by: Atlanta Hawks
- Playing career: 1978–1983
- Position: Shooting guard / small forward
- Number: 21

Career history
- 1978–1980: Atlanta Hawks
- 1982–1983: Akita Isuzu Motors

Career highlights
- JBL2 MVP (1982); JBL2 Best5 (1982); JBL2 Scoring leader (1982); NCAA champion (1978); NCAA Final Four Most Outstanding Player (1978); Helms Foundation Player of the Year (1978); Consensus second-team All-American (1978); SEC Male Athlete of the Year (1978); 2× First-team All-SEC (1977, 1978); Second-team All-SEC (1976); Third-team Parade All-American (1974); Kentucky Mr. Basketball (1974)

Career NBA statistics
- Points: 1,040 (6.7 ppg)
- Rebounds: 456 (2.9 rpg)
- Assists: 142 (0.9 apg)
- Stats at NBA.com
- Stats at Basketball Reference

Jack "Goose" Givens (born September 21, 1956) is an American former professional basketball player. He played college basketball for the Kentucky Wildcats, earning consensus second-team All-American honors. He led the team to the 1978 NCAA Men's Division I Basketball Championship and was named that year's Final Four Most Outstanding Player due in most part to his 41-point performance in Kentucky's 94–88 victory over Duke in the championship game. He was a 6-foot-5-inch (1.96 m), 205-pound (93 kg) forward. Givens played professionally for the Atlanta Hawks of the National Basketball Association (NBA). He also played overseas in Japan.

== Biography ==
=== Collegiate career ===
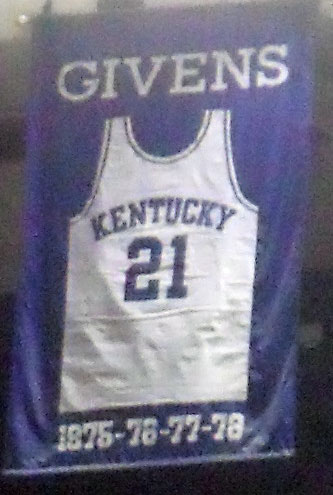
A jersey honoring Givens hangs in Rupp Arena

Givens earned Kentucky Mr. Basketball and Parade All-American honors after his senior year at Lexington's Bryan Station High School in 1974. In his freshman year at the University of Kentucky, the Wildcats finished as national runners-up, falling 92–85 to UCLA in the 1975 Final Four championship game. In 1978, Givens and Kentucky returned to the Final Four at the Checkerdome in St. Louis, Missouri. After leading Kentucky to a semifinal victory over the Arkansas, he scored a career-high 41 points and made 18 of 27 field goal attempts against Duke to help Kentucky clinch their fifth NCAA Championship in men's basketball.

Givens lettered four times in varsity basketball from 1974–75 to 1977–78. In that span, he scored 2,038 points in 123 games (16.6 ppg), ranking third on the school's all-time scoring list. He was named first team all-Southeastern Conference three times from 1976 to 1978 and was a consensus second-team All-American in 1978. Kentucky retired Givens' #21 jersey and a banner in his honor hangs in the rafters of Rupp Arena, Kentucky's home court.

=== NBA career ===
Following his collegiate career, the Atlanta Hawks drafted Givens with the 16th overall pick in the 1978 NBA draft. Over two seasons for the Hawks, Givens averaged 16.7 minutes per game adding 6.7 points on 40.1% shooting.

=== Italy, Belgium and Japan ===
Givens played for the Akita Isuzu Motors basketball team of Japan, where he still returns regularly with his family to visit the friends he made there, in 1982–83.

=== Broadcasting ===
After his playing career, Givens was an NBA television color analyst for various networks and teams, most notably with the Turner Broadcasting System (TBS) and the Orlando Magic for both the Sun Sports and FS Florida cable stations from the team's inception in 1989 to 2004 before being replaced by Matt Guokas. Following the death of Mike Pratt in 2022, Givens joined the UK Sports Network beginning in the 2022–23 season as an analyst for Kentucky men's basketball games.

=== Personal life ===
Givens is the CEO and President of Orlando Comets, a basketball organization that has placed over 60 players into NCAA basketball on full scholarships. In 2006, the Orlando Comets won the national AAU Championship in the 16 and under division. Jack and his wife Linda have two children, Jeremy and Jaimie.

== Career statistics ==
Legend
GP	Games played	GS	Games started	MPG	Minutes per game
FG%	Field goal percentage	3P%	3-point field goal percentage	FT%	Free throw percentage
RPG	Rebounds per game	APG	Assists per game	SPG	Steals per game
BPG	Blocks per game	PPG	Points per game	**Bold**	Career high

=== NBA ===
==== Regular season ====
Year	Team	GP	GS	MPG	FG%	3P%	FT%	RPG	APG	SPG	BPG	PPG
1978–79	Atlanta	74	**3**	**18.2**	**.415**		.756	2.9	**1.1**	**1.0**	**.2**	**7.7**
1979–80	Atlanta	**82**		15.3	.385	.000	**.828**	**3.0**	.7	.6	**.2**	5.7
Career		156	3	16.7	.401	.000	.791	2.9	.9	.8	.2	6.7

==== Playoffs ====
Year	Team	GP	MPG	FG%	3P%	FT%	RPG	APG	SPG	BPG	PPG
1979	Atlanta	**9**	**9.0**	**.333**		**1.000**	**2.3**	.3	.1	**.2**	**2.6**
1980	Atlanta	4	**9.0**	.214	–	–	1.3	**.8**	**.5**	.0	1.5
Career		13	9.0	.295	–	1.000	2.0	.5	.2	.2	2.2
