= WBZW (disambiguation) =

WBZW may refer to:

- WBZW, a radio station (96.7 FM) licensed to Union City, Georgia, United States
- WNDO, a radio station (1520 AM) licensed to Apopka, Florida, United States, which was WBZW from 2010 to 2020
- KDKA-FM, a radio station (93.7 FM) licensed to Pittsburgh, Pennsylvania, United States that previously held the WBZW-FM callsign
- WXXF, a radio station (107.7 FM) licensed to Loudonville, Ohio, United States that previously held the WBZW-FM callsign
