= WMMO =

Coordinates: 28.574°N 81.463°W

- Orlando, Florida; United States
- Broadcast area: Greater Orlando
- Frequency: 98.9 MHz (HD Radio)
- Branding: 98.9 WMMO

Programming
- Format: Classic rock

Ownership
- Owner: Cox Media Group; (Cox Radio, LLC)
- Sister stations: WCFB, WDBO, WOEX, WWKA part of Cox cluster with TV station WFTV

History
- First air date: August 19, 1990 (as WEZO)
- Former call signs: WURG (1988–1990, CP); WEZO (2/1990-9/1990)
- Call sign meaning: May mean More Music for Orlando, though the station wanted a call sign similar to WMMS in Cleveland

Technical information
- Licensing authority: FCC
- Facility ID: 23444
- Class: C2
- ERP: 44,000 watts
- HAAT: 159 meters (522 ft)

Links
- Public license information: Public file; LMS
- Webcast: Listen Live
- Website: WMMO.com

WMMO (98.9 MHz) is a commercial FM radio station in Orlando, Florida. It is owned by the Cox Media Group, and airs a classic hits radio format that leans toward classic rock. Most songs heard on WMMO were hits from the 1970s, 1980s and 1990s, on both the Top 40 charts and on the Album Rock charts. WMMO's studios and offices are located in Orlando on North John Young Parkway (Route 423). WMMO broadcasts in the HD Radio format.

The transmitter tower is off Park Hamilton Boulevard in Pine Hills. The site is shared with WTLN, owned by the Salem Media Group.

== History ==
=== Early years ===
Former logo of the radio station used from August 19, 1990, through January 31, 2001

In the late 1980s, the Federal Communications Commission (FCC) awarded a construction permit to build a new FM radio station in Orlando to the Urban Broadcasting Corporation. The call sign WURG was granted as the station was being built.

The station signed on the air on August 19, 1990. It was owned by Radio Orlando and it aired a unique format with a large library, a mix of soft rock, adult album alternative and classic rock, and was considered to be the first ever example of the "Rock Adult Contemporary" format. Its creators sought to bring back a listening experience similar to early FM rock stations of the late 1960s and 1970s, focusing on music rather than contests and promotions. A popular slogan in its early days was, "if you want to win money, play the lottery."

WMMO used a wide-ranging playlist of songs from many genres. Its library stretched from the mid-1960s to current releases, unlike many stations that focus on small slices of music from specific genres. WMMO also made a promise to always identify songs by title and artist, and to never talk over the music. "We love the music as much as you do" was a slogan the station used during this era.

=== Unusual call sign and transmitter location ===
The call letters used at first were WEZO. After a month on the air, the call sign switched to WMMO. The station derives its call letters from WMMS in Cleveland; the founding programmer and chief engineer, Cary Pall, was a fan of WMMS, and secured the call sign to honor the legendary rock station, even though WMMO's format was not as rock-oriented.

WMMO was one of only two radio stations in the world broadcasting from a fully enclosed transmitter. WMMO was located at the top of the SunBank Center (now the SunTrust Center), Orlando's tallest building. Its effective radiated power (ERP) was 38,000 watts and its antenna was only 439 feet in height above average terrain (HAAT), while most of the top FM stations in Orlando broadcast at 100,000 watts on towers 1,500 feet or taller. The station's coverage area was limited due to WKGR in Fort Pierce, which broadcasts on 98.7 FM. Around 2015, WKGR's transmitter was moved about 20 miles south to Wellington, near West Palm Beach; because of this, WMMO was able to increase its power and antenna height slightly.

=== Ownership changes ===
In 1991, WMMO was bought by Granam Communications for $8.15 million. The station continued its unique playlist of Soft Rock, Adult Album Rock and Classic Rock. In 1997, Granam Communications was acquired by Infinity Broadcasting, later part of CBS Radio. Infinity quickly spun off WHOO (now WTLN), WHTQ (now WOEX) and WMMO to Cox Radio, so the company could acquire WCKG in Chicago.

Cox had plans move WMMO's transmitter to WHTQ's former tower in Pine Hills for better coverage, but a breakdown in negotiations with WHTQ's former owner forced WMMO's transmitter to remain at the SunBank Center/SunTrust Center for several more years.

In 2008, longtime personalities Jerry Steffen and Jay Francisco were let go. Steffen was at WMMO for 18 years and Francisco for 14 years. Francisco was rehired in 2011 for several more years. Also in 2011, longtime morning host Shawn Burke was released after 12 years at WMMO. In 2012, the station abandoned its previous practice of listing the names of all the songs and artists played. The music also became more rock-oriented during these years. In July 2015, WMMO began referring to itself as a classic hits station in an effort to compete with classic hits outlet WOCL. Recently, WMMO has moved its music in a direction to become the de facto Classic Rock station for Orlando.

== DJ Line Up ==
- Mornings—Jay & Brandi
- Middays—Joe Rock
- Afternoons—Hildi
- Evenings—A.J. Maguire

Former logo of the radio station used from February 2001 through April 2002

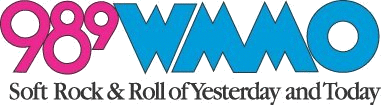
Former logo of the radio station used from May 2002 through December 2011

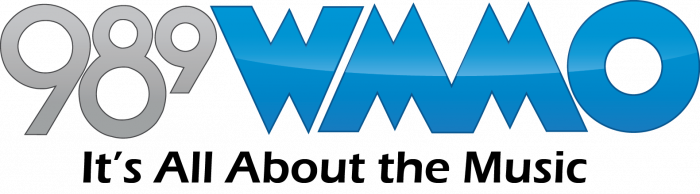
Former logo through early 2015.
