= WUNA =

Ocoee, Florida; United States
- Broadcast area: Orlando
- Frequency: 1480 kHz

Programming
- Language: Haitian Creole
- Format: Full-service

Ownership
- Owner: Jesús and Virgen Torrado; (J & V Communications Inc)

History
- First air date: October 1961
- Former call signs: WYNZ (CP); WXIV (1961–1965); WVCF (1965–1991)
- Call sign meaning: "One" in Spanish

Technical information
- Licensing authority: FCC
- Facility ID: 19054
- Class: D
- Power: 1,000 watts day 71 watts night
- Transmitter coordinates: 28°33′28″N 81°32′28″W

Links
- Public license information: Public file; LMS
- Website: www.radiohaititropical.com

WUNA (1480 AM) is a radio station licensed to Ocoee, Florida, United States, serving the Orlando area. The station is currently owned by Jesús and Virgen Torrado, through licensee J & V Communications Inc. and airs programming in Haitian Creole branded as "Radio Haiti Tropical". The studios and transmitter site are located on Bluford Avenue in Ocoee.

== History ==
=== The religion years ===
On January 25, 1961, the Federal Communications Commission granted a construction permit for a new daytime-only radio station on 1480 kHz, licensed to Windermere, to the Windermere Radio Company, owned by Atlanta preacher Louis E. Latham and Jack L. Gibson. The permit was granted the call letters WYNZ, but after Gibson dropped out of the permittee, Latham selected the call letters WXIV and began broadcasting in October 1961. However, Latham did not own the station for long. In 1962, a sale to Thomas H. Moffit fell through; this failed transaction prompted Moffit to build his own station, WTLN (1520 AM).

The next year, a sale to American Homes Stations, Inc., was consummated; the group included two WXIV employees. American Homes attempted to move the transmitter site and upgrade to 5 kW; this would be denied in 1967, but a call sign change to WVCF did take place on December 22, 1965. Under both sets of call letters, the station aired primarily religious programming. An FM outlet, Orlando-licensed WWQS (105.1 FM), launched in August 1967. Two years later, the station was involved in another failed sales attempt when UNICOM Stations filed to buy WVCF and WWQS; UNICOM, affiliated with religious program distributor United Communications Mission, planned new $500,000 studio facilities for the pair. However, the FCC dismissed the sale application in November 1970 for failure to prosecute.

American Homes sold off WWQS to Rounsaville Radio in 1973, retaining WVCF. The next year, it filed to move WVCF from Windermere to a new site in Ocoee, which was approved in 1975; the city of license changed two years later. In 1979, WVCF was purchased for $250,000 by James S. Beattie (Orlando Broadcasting), owner of two other AM radio stations in Florida and who harbored ambitions to build a religious radio network across the state. Beattie owned the station until 1983, selling it for $400,000 to William A. Masi. Under the name Metro-Orlando Broadcasting, Masi promised a more musically driven religious format.

=== Going Spanish ===
In 1989, Efraín Archilla Roig of Tampa, owner of stations in Tampa and Humacao, Puerto Rico, purchased WVCF from Masi for $450,000. WVCF continued with its religious format, but as the station faced financial trouble in 1991, major changes took place. The station began broadcasting Spanish-language Christian music from noon to sunset in October 1991, airing English-language fare in the morning and eight hours each weekend of Haitian Creole programs. Under the management of Juan Nieves, the station went all-Spanish shortly afterward; the call letters were changed on December 13, 1991, to WUNA, for the number "one", and the station began a financial turnaround. "Radio Una" aired a Spanish-language contemporary hit radio format.

By 1997, WUNA had shifted to a full-time regional Mexican format, initially known as "Fiesta Mexicana" before changing to "Onda Mexicana". The Freedom Network, Inc., acquired the station in 1998 and sold it along with four other major-market AMs to Multicultural Broadcasting for $12 million two years later.

=== J & V ownership ===
The station continued as Onda Mexicana under Multicultural's ownership. In 2010, Multicultural exited Orlando by selling WUNA to J & V Communications, owned by the Torrado family. Another change, however, was on the way, with bigger implications for the future of the station: Onda Mexicana bought Clermont's WWFL (1340 AM) later that year and moved its programming to that frequency. As a result, a new time brokerage agreement was signed with Servando Lupercio to program the station, which was known as "La Jefa 1480" and continued in the regional Mexican format. In 2014, the station began airing Haitian Creole-language programming from Radio Haiti Tropical, after Rossener Jean-Pierre signed a time brokerage agreement on November 4, 2013, to replace Lupercio's programming.
