= David Steele (sportscaster) =

American sportscaster

- Born: August 13, 1953 (age 73); Jacksonville, Florida, U.S.
- Occupations: Sportscaster, Play-by-Play Announcer, Area Announcer
- Years active: 1973 – 2026

David Steele (born August 13, 1953, in Jacksonville, Florida) is an American former television and radio sports broadcaster. He was an announcer on the NBA's Orlando Magic basketball games on FanDuel Sports Network Sun and FanDuel Sports Network Florida.

== Career ==
=== Orlando Magic ===
He assumed the play-by-play duties for the Orlando Magic's TV broadcasts in 1998, teaming up initially with Jack Givens, then later with former NBA player, head coach and veteran NBA color commentator Matt Guokas. Steele replaced Chip Caray as the teams' play-by-play announcer after serving as the Magic radio play-by-play announcer for nine seasons. Steele also serves as a sports columnist for foxsportsflorida.com.

In voting for the 2010 NBA MVP award, Steele was one of three people to vote Dwight Howard 1st place on the ballot.

In 2014, Steele announced an NCAA national semifinal between the Florida Gators and Connecticut Huskies for the Gators' teamcast on TNT. He also announced a game on TNT between the Florida Gators basketball versus Georgia Bulldogs basketball.

In 1982, Steele was hired by the Gator Radio Network to provide play-by-play for University of Florida football and basketball games. He continued to handle those duties until 1989 when he was hired by the Orlando Magic.

On July 14, 2026, Steele announced his retirement after 37 years with the Magic. He spent nine years as the team's play-by-play commentator before spending the rest of his career on the team's television broadcasts.

He graduated from the University of Georgia in June 1975. Three days later, Steele was on-the-air anchoring the 5pm sports broadcast as Sports Director at WJHG in Panama City, Florida. He left WJHG for Asheville, North Carolina where he was the Sports Director at WLOS until he was hired by the Gator Radio Network.

=== Awards and recognitions ===
Steele has been named "Sportscaster of the Year" in Florida and North Carolina. He is a past president of the Florida Sportscasters Association.

== Personal life ==
Steele and his wife, Sally, have three children. He lives in Orlando, Florida.
