= WCFB =

- Daytona Beach, Florida; United States
- Broadcast area: Daytona Beach and Greater Orlando
- Frequency: 94.5 MHz (HD Radio)
- Branding: Star 94.5

Programming
- Format: Urban AC
- Subchannels: HD2: Power Orlando (Top 40 (CHR))

Ownership
- Owner: Cox Media Group; (Cox Radio, LLC)
- Sister stations: WDBO, WOEX, WMMO, WWKA; part of Cox cluster with TV station WFTV

History
- First air date: March 31, 1947
- Former call signs: WNDB-FM (1947–1973); WDNJ (1973–1978); WWLV (1978–1992)
- Call sign meaning: Central Florida's B 94.5 (former branding)

Technical information
- Licensing authority: FCC
- Facility ID: 10343
- Class: C
- ERP: 100,000 watts
- HAAT: 451 meters (1480 ft)
- Transmitter coordinates: 28.980°N 81.455°W

Links
- Public license information: Public file; LMS
- Webcast: Listen Live Star 94.5; HD2: Listen Live Power Orlando
- Website: star945.com powerorlando.com (HD2)

WCFB (94.5 FM) is a commercial radio station licensed to Daytona Beach, Florida, serving the Greater Orlando and Daytona areas. The station is owned by Cox Media Group, and airs an urban adult contemporary radio format. Its studios and offices are located on North John Young Parkway in Orlando. On weekdays, WCFB carries the syndicated Rickey Smiley Morning Show, as well as an hour of urban contemporary gospel music at 5 a.m., and a Quiet Storm program at night.

The station has a powerful 100,000 watt Class C signal, heard from St. Augustine to Ocala to Kissimmee. (The horizontal polarization in 97,500 watts, but increases to the maximum 100,000 with beam tilt.) The transmitter tower is off Redlands Drive in DeLand.

== History ==
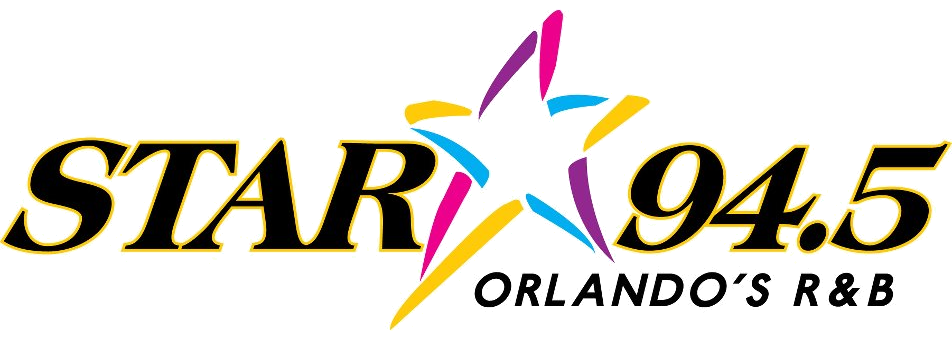
Former Star 94.5 logo

The station first signed on March 31, 1947, as WNDB-FM, the first standalone FM station in the state of Florida; the next year, the newspaper launched an AM outlet, WNDB (1150 AM). It was owned by the News-Journal Corporation, the publisher of the Daytona Beach News Journal. For most of its first two decades, it largely simulcast its AM counterpart. In 1973, it changed its call sign to WDNJ, airing a beautiful music format with some classical music as well.

In 1978, the station switched to soft adult contemporary as WWLV, Love 94.5. On September 25, 1992, after being purchased by New City Communications, WWLV flipped to country as WCFB, using the identifier Young Country B94.5. Some of B94.5 on air personalities included "Big" Steve Kelly, Ellis B Feaster (now at WPOZ in Orlando), & Buzz Jackson. On May 11, 1995, WCFB changed formats to Rhythmic AC, which later evolved to Urban Adult Contemporary as Star 94.5. This makes WCFB the first urban radio station in years in Orlando to challenge longtime WJHM, which switched formats from rhythmic contemporary to urban contemporary by that time. When WJHM returned to Rhythmic Top 40 in 2011, WCFB once again became the de facto Urban outlet in Central Florida, even though it has always stayed in its own lane with its audience rather than try to compete fiercely for listeners.

WCFB was acquired by Cox Media Group in 1997.

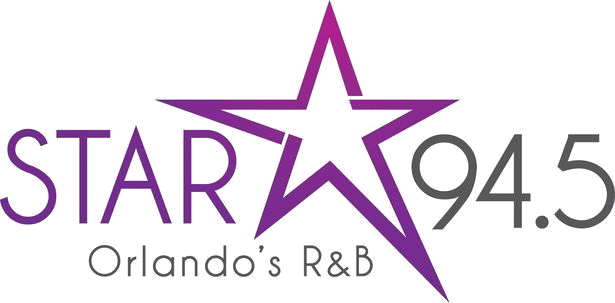
Logo as Urban AC, 2010–2014; the new logo is the same, but with the new slogan.

A tornado on February 2, 2007, knocked WCFB's signal off the air for a brief period, as it destroyed the transmitter site and a nearby building, near Pine Lakes. The station returned to the air broadcasting from a temporary transmitter located at another Cox owned tower in Christmas for a short period of time before the station's temporary transmitter site moved to high power facilities at a tower in Orange City off of Miller Rd. The replacement tower in Paisley was finished in mid-November 2007. As of October 24, 2008, WCFB has moved back to the Pine Lakes site.

Previous logo, 2014-2016; the new logo is the same, but with a new slogan.

On November 26, 2014, WCFB flipped from Urban AC to classic hip hop. At that time, WCFB dropped the syndicated "Tom Joyner Morning Show", and replaced it with The Steve Harvey Morning Show. However, due to negative audience feedback, in December 2014, WCFB flipped back to Urban AC, with the classic hip hop format moving to their HD3 sub-channel.

== Digital subchannels ==
=== HD2 and W297BB ===
WCFB-HD2 broadcasts in the HD Radio hybrid format. In 2014, the HD2 channel began simulcasting on an FM translator at 107.3 MHz with the call sign W297BB. That translator was originally home to Christian AC-formatted WREH and was simulcast on iHeartMedia's WRUM-HD2 before Cox bought the translator in August 2013.

On June 16, 2014, WCFB-HD2 (which dropped an urban gospel format) and W297BB began stunting with a "Wheel of Formats", which consisted of a Christian Contemporary music format known as Rejoice 107.3, and a soft adult contemporary format, 107.3 The Dove. This was followed by a 40-hour loop of The Beatles' "Revolution". On June 19 at noon, WCFB-HD2/W297BB officially flipped to alternative rock, branded as "X107.3". "X" launched with "Pompeii" by Bastille. The translator/HD2 signal also aired Jacksonville Jaguars programming when sister station WDBO was occupied by Miami Dolphins programming. (WDBO owns the affiliate rights in Orlando for both teams.)

On February 22, 2016, at midnight, after playing "Ways to Go" by Grouplove, W297BB/WCFB-HD2 began stunting with a loop of Newcleus' "Jam On It." At noon, the frequencies flipped to Spanish Hot AC, branded as 107.3 Solo Éxitos.

After the "Exitos" format was tweaked to contemporary hits and moved to WOEX on June 29, 2020, WCFB-HD2 flipped to ESPN Radio's national feed and was later deactivated. The HD2 signal was reactivated in March 2022, carrying a simulcast of former sister station WPYO, pending that station’s sale to Spanish Broadcasting System and eventual format flip. On April 1, 2022, at midnight, WPYO's former CHR format without on-air staff and commercials ended up moving to WCFB-HD2 entirely under the "Power Orlando" branding. The first song on "Power Orlando" was "Heat Waves" by Glass Animals. “Power Orlando” ended up lasting longer than the remnants of “96 Rock” that continued on the HD2 sub channel of WDBO-FM (now WOEX), which only lasted a few months.
