= Matt Guokas Jr. =

American basketball player and coach

Matt Guokas
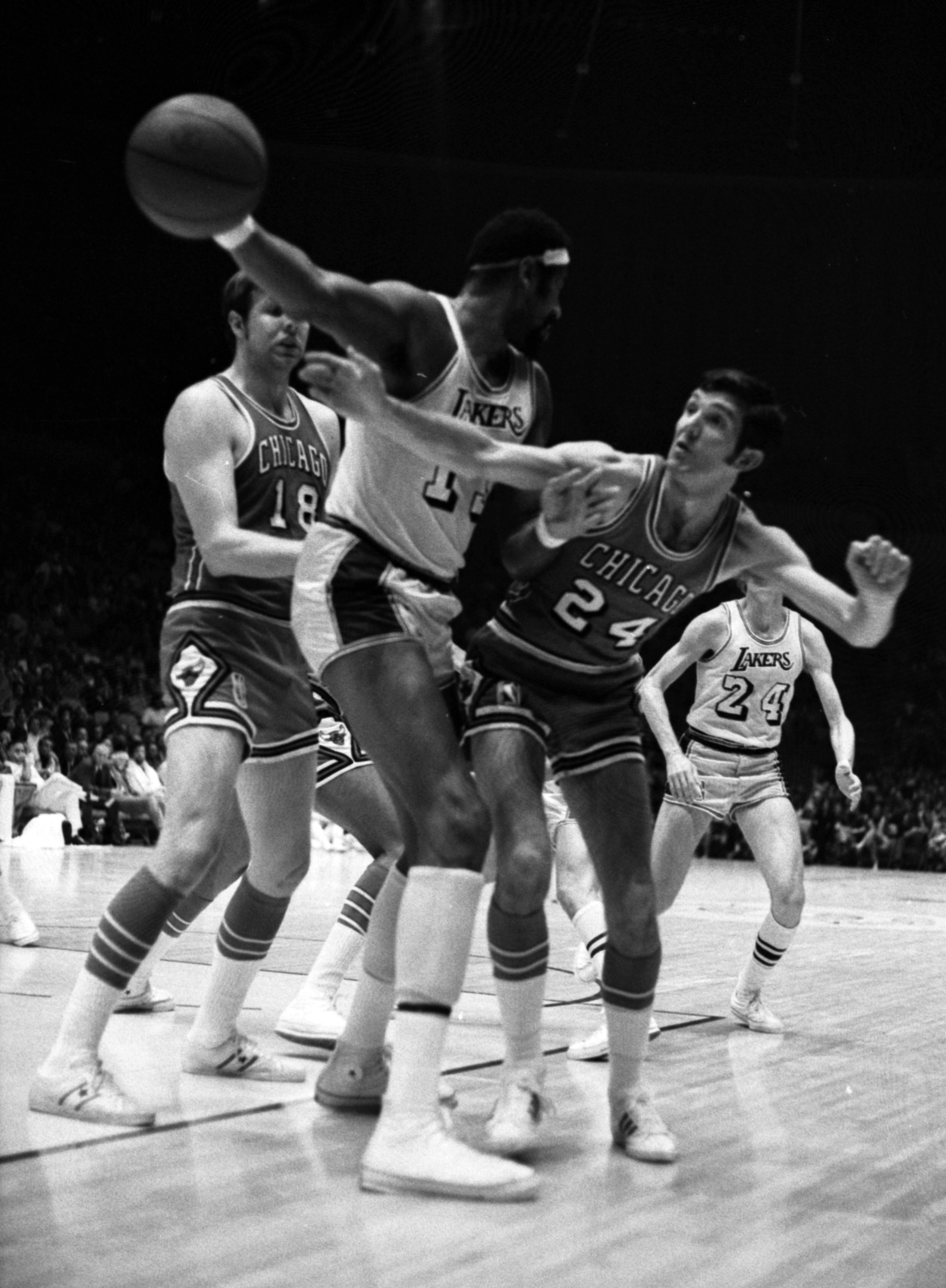
- Guokas defending against Wilt Chamberlain, 1971

Personal information
- Born: February 25, 1944 (age 82) Philadelphia, Pennsylvania, U.S.
- Listed height: 6 ft 5 in (1.96 m)
- Listed weight: 175 lb (79 kg)

Career information
- High school: St. Joseph's Prep (Philadelphia, Pennsylvania)
- College: Saint Joseph's (1964–1966)
- NBA draft: 1966: 1st round, 9th overall pick
- Drafted by: Philadelphia 76ers
- Playing career: 1966–1976
- Position: Shooting guard / small forward
- Number: 14, 24, 11, 4, 10

Career history

Playing
- 1966–1970: Philadelphia 76ers
- 1970–1971: Chicago Bulls
- 1971–1973: Cincinnati Royals / Kansas City-Omaha Kings
- 1973–1974: Houston Rockets
- 1974: Buffalo Braves
- 1974–1975: Chicago Bulls
- 1975–1976: Kansas City Kings

Career highlights
- As player: NBA champion (1967); Consensus second-team All-American (1966); As assistant coach: NBA champion (1983)

Career statistics
- Points: 4,285 (5.8 ppg)
- Rebounds: 1,446 (2.0 rpg)
- Assists: 2,174 (3.0 apg)
- Stats at NBA.com
- Stats at Basketball Reference

Matthew George Guokas Jr. (/ˈɡuːkəs/ GOO-kəs; born February 25, 1944) is an American former professional basketball player and coach. His father, Matt Sr. and uncle, Al, also played in the NBA.

Guokas and his father, Matt Sr., were the first father-son duo to both win NBA championships as players; this feat has since been repeated by the Barrys (Rick and Brent), the Waltons (Bill and Luke), the Thompsons (Mychal and Klay), and the Paytons (Gary Payton and Gary Payton II).

== Biography ==
=== Playing career ===
Guokas played college basketball for hometown Saint Joseph's University, where he set many school records in assists and steals. He was an All-American as a junior in 1966, and graduated in 1967. After SJU, Guokas was selected in the first round by the Philadelphia 76ers team and played for the team featuring Wilt Chamberlain, Hal Greer, Chet Walker and Billy Cunningham that ended the eight-year championship streak of the Boston Celtics. He also played with the Buffalo Braves, Chicago Bulls, Cincinnati Royals, Houston Rockets, and Kansas City Kings, all of the NBA. In the 1972–73 season, Guokas finished second (to Chamberlain) in the NBA in field goal percentage with a .570 clip during that season.

=== Coaching and broadcasting ===
Guokas later returned to the Sixers as an assistant coach under Billy Cunningham, and was named head coach when Cunningham retired in 1985. He led the Sixers to two second-place finishes, but was fired after a slow start to the 1987–88 season.

After a year away from the game, he served as the first coach of the Orlando Magic, steering the team through its first four years, the last of which saw the Magic come within one game of making the playoffs in Shaquille O'Neal's rookie year. He compiled a combined 230–305 career record in parts of seven seasons.

He formerly worked as a TV color commentator and sports analyst for the Magic on Fox Sports Florida and Sun Sports cable channels, teaming with veteran NBA and college sportscaster David Steele. He called the Magic's games from 2004 to 2013. He also served as a color commentator for NBA on NBC broadcasts during the 1990s and was a color commentator for the Cleveland Cavaliers for Fox Sports Ohio cable channel for a number of years in the late 1990s and early 2000s.

== Career playing statistics ==
Legend
GP	Games played	GS	Games started	MPG	Minutes per game
FG%	Field goal percentage	3P%	3-point field goal percentage	FT%	Free throw percentage
RPG	Rebounds per game	APG	Assists per game	SPG	Steals per game
BPG	Blocks per game	PPG	Points per game	**Bold**	Career high
*	Led the league

=== NBA ===
==== Regular season ====
Year	Team	GP	GS	MPG	FG%	FT%	RPG	APG	SPG	BPG	PPG
1966–67†	Philadelphia	69		11.7	.389	.605	1.2	1.5			3.0
1967–68	Philadelphia	**82**		19.7	.483	.776	2.3	2.3			6.1
1968–69	Philadelphia	72		11.6	.426	.667	1.3	1.4			3.3
1969–70	Philadelphia	80		19.5	.454	.711	2.7	2.8			6.1
1970–71	Philadelphia	1	0	5.0	–	–	1.0	.0			.0
1970–71	Chicago	78	**35**	28.3	.493	.732	2.0	4.4			6.6
1971–72	Cincinnati	61		32.4	.496	.771	2.3	**5.3**			7.3
1972–73	Kansas City–Omaha	79		**36.0**	**.570**	**.822**	**3.1**	5.1			9.1
1973–74	Kansas City–Omaha	9		35.0	.494	.667	2.3	4.0	**.9**	.1	**10.0**
1973–74	Houston	39		25.8	.458	.750	1.5	3.4	.7	**.4**	5.3
1973–74	Buffalo	27		20.3	.555	.500	1.5	2.6	.7	.2	4.9
1974–75	Chicago	**82**	12	25.5	.510	.757	1.7	2.2	.5	.2	7.2
1975–76	Chicago	18	0	15.4	.486	.818	.9	1.6	.3	.1	4.5
1975–76	Kansas City	38		13.6	.374	.563	1.2	1.1	.3	.1	2.2
Career		735	47	22.6	.489	.727	2.0	3.0	.5	.2	5.8

==== Playoffs ====
Year	Team	GP	MPG	FG%	FT%	RPG	APG	SPG	BPG	PPG
1967†	Philadelphia	**15***	16.8	.406	.765	2.0	1.5			4.3
1968	Philadelphia	13	**25.2**	.380	.741	**3.3**	**2.3**			6.2
1969	Philadelphia	5	20.0	.407	.800	2.4	1.6			5.2
1970	Philadelphia	2	11.5	**.750**	**1.000**	1.5	.5			**6.5**
1971	Chicago	6	13.8	.571	.800	1.3	2.0			3.3
1974	Buffalo	6	14.2	.533	.750	1.3	2.2	.0	**.2**	3.2
1975	Chicago	13	15.5	.343	.875	1.1	.8	**.5**	.1	2.4
Career		60	17.9	.417	.776	2.0	1.6	.4	.1	4.2

== Head coaching record ==
Legend
Regular season	G	Games coached	W	Games won	L	Games lost	W–L %	Win–loss %
Playoffs	PG	Playoff games	PW	Playoff wins	PL	Playoff losses	PW–L %	Playoff win–loss %

Team	Year	G	W	L	W–L%	Finish	PG	PW	PL	PW–L%	Result
Philadelphia	1985–86	82	54	28	.659	2nd in Atlantic	12	6	6	.500	Lost in Conference semifinals
Philadelphia	1986–87	82	45	37	.549	2nd in Atlantic	5	2	3	.400	Lost in First round
Philadelphia	1987–88	43	20	23	.465	(fired)	—	—	—	—	—
Orlando	1989–90	82	18	64	.220	7th in Central	—	—	—	—	Missed playoffs
Orlando	1990–91	82	31	51	.378	4th in Midwest	—	—	—	—	Missed playoffs
Orlando	1991–92	82	21	61	.256	7th in Atlantic	—	—	—	—	Missed playoffs
Orlando	1992–93	82	41	41	.500	4th in Atlantic	—	—	—	—	Missed playoffs
Career		535	230	305	.430		17	8	9	.471	

== Personal life ==
Guokas's father (Matt Sr.), uncle (Al), and son (Matt III) all played for Saint Joseph's University.
