= The Shannon Burke Show =

American radio talk show

The Shannon Burke Show is a conservative American radio talk show based in Orlando, Florida.

== History ==
Florida Man Radio 103.1FM Fort Walton Beach, with co-host/Executive Producer Jeff Adams and Eazy E Producer.

The Shannon Burke Show aired in Atlanta on 106.7 WYAY-FM. Its final broadcast on WYAY (106.7 FM) was May 31, 2019 as Atlanta-based Cumulus Media sold the station to K-Love, a Christian pop network (owned by Educational Media Foundation).

=== WFLF ===
- Shannon Burke (2003–2004) covered mornings for WFLF/540.

=== WTKS-FM ===
- Shannon Burke (May 2004 – April 2009) was host of the mid-day show.

=== Termination from Clear Channel Communications ===
Clear Channel Communications terminated the employment of Burke effective May 4, 2009 following his shooting of his wife and dog. The news was first announced by Jim Philips during The Philips Phile show on May 4, 2009.

== See also ==
- Bubba the Love Sponge
- The Monsters in the Morning
