= WNDO =

Radio station in Apopka, Florida

Coordinates: 28°39′08″N 81°29′40″W

- Apopka, Florida; United States
- Broadcast area: Orlando metropolitan area
- Frequency: 1520 kHz
- Branding: Radio Nouvelle Lumiere

Programming
- Language: Haitian Creole
- Format: Talk

Ownership
- Owner: Sam Rogatinsky; (Orlando Radio Marketing, Inc.)

History
- First air date: 1964
- Former call signs: WTLN (1964–1998); WHIM (1998–2010); WBZW (2010–2020)

Technical information
- Licensing authority: FCC
- Facility ID: 20350
- Class: B
- Power: 5,000 watts day 350 watts night
- Translators: W264DU 100.7 (Apopka, CP)

Links
- Public license information: Public file; LMS
- Website: orlando.sakpase.fm

WNDO (1520 AM) is a radio station licensed to serve Apopka, Florida, United States. Owned by Sam Rogatinsky, through licensee Orlando Radio Marketing, Inc., the station operates on 1520 kHz with a daytime power of 5 kW & a nighttime power of 350 watts. Its transmitter is located in Apopka. The station currently programs a Haitian Creole-language format known as Radio Nouvelle Lumiere.

== History ==
=== Religious WTLN ===
1520 kHz in Apopka was established as one of the first religious radio stations in central Florida in 1964. Tom Moffit Sr., a Philadelphia announcer and consultant to preachers, saw an opportunity in a new 1,000-watt station on 1480 kHz, WXIV, owned by an Atlanta preacher, but after delays scuttled the purchase, he instead built WTLN. The call letters represented the four members of Moffit's family: wife, Tom, Linda and Nancy. It originally aired a middle-of-the-road music format with religious programs interspersed.

Four years later, WTLN expanded with the launch of WTLN-FM 95.3 in 1968. The FM station offered the then-daytimer the opportunity to broadcast after sunset. WTLN/WTLN-FM continued to operate on a simulcast basis until 1991. At that time, the AM frequency began airing a separate Southern Gospel format as "1520 The Word"; the FM continued with its soft contemporary Christian music, and the two stations continued to jointly broadcast selected programs. One of those programs was Central Florida Forum, hosted by Dr. George Crossley; the program moved exclusively to WTLN in 1995. Crossley was arrested in 1996 and convicted the next year after hiring a hitman—in actuality, an undercover federal agent—to kill his former lover's estranged husband; said victim then started a campaign to encourage an advertiser boycott of WTLN. After spending 40 months in prison, Crossley returned to radio at WEUS (810 AM); in 2010 he collapsed while at that station, dying shortly after.

WTLN was approved in 1995 to begin nighttime service at its present 350 watts.

=== New call letters, new owner ===
In early 1998, Moffit struck a deal to sell WTLN-FM, which had retained the same owner since 1968, to Cox Radio for $14.3 million and Cox's AM station WZKD (950 AM). The call letters of 1520 AM changed to WHIM on July 1, 1998, airing a traditional Christian music format it called "Christian heritage radio"; additionally, the WTLN religious programming moved exclusively to the 950 frequency on January 1, 1999.

Alton Rainbow sold WHIM and WTLN after more than 40 years to Salem Communications in a $10 million acquisition in 2005. That same year, Salem acquired WORL (660 AM), giving the company three AM stations in Orlando.

In 2010, WHIM changed its call letters to WBZW. Known as "1520 The Biz" and later simply as "1520 WBZW, Your Hometown Station", the station aired a business news format as well as talk programs of interest to the Apopka area. In 2016, talk show host Jim Turner, who helmed an afternoon show known as "My Community", was suspended after he called victims of the Orlando nightclub shooting "sexual deviants".

=== Radio Nouvelle Lumiere ===
In November 2019, Salem Media Group sold WBZW and the construction permit for its unbuilt translator for $185,000 to Orlando Radio Marketing, owned by Sam Rogatinsky. It was the second sale by Salem that year of one of its Orlando stations, having reached a deal to divest the 660 frequency in July. On March 1, 2020, WBZW dropped its business talk format and flipped to Haitian Creole, becoming the network's third station after WPBR in the West Palm Beach area and WTPA in the Tampa area, also owned by Rogatinsky. The sale to Rogatinsky was consummated on April 6, 2020, at which point the station changed its call sign to WNDO.
