= WWKA =

Country music radio station in Orlando, Florida

Coordinates: 28.569°N 81.054°W

- Orlando, Florida; United States
- Broadcast area: Central Florida
- Frequency: 92.3 MHz (HD Radio)
- Branding: K92-3

Programming
- Language: English
- Format: Country music
- Subchannels: HD2: Big Machine Radio

Ownership
- Owner: Cox Media Group; (Cox Radio, LLC)
- Sister stations: WCFB; WDBO; WOEX; WMMO; part of Cox cluster with TV station WFTV

History
- First air date: 1949
- Former call signs: WDBO-FM (1949–1983)

Technical information
- Licensing authority: FCC
- Facility ID: 48716
- Class: C
- ERP: 99,000 watts; (100,000 with beam tilt)
- HAAT: 454 meters (1,490 ft)

Links
- Public license information: Public file; LMS
- Webcast: Listen live
- Website: www.k923orlando.com

WWKA (92.3 FM, "K92-3") is a commercial radio station in Orlando, Florida. It is owned by Cox Media Group and broadcasts a country music radio format. The studios and offices are located in Orlando on North John Young Parkway (State Road 423).

The transmitter tower is in Bithlo, off Fort Christmas Road (County Road 420). The station has an effective radiated power of 100,000 watts with beam tilt. It covers much of Central Florida from Daytona Beach to Palm Bay to Lakeland. WWKA broadcasts in the HD radio format.

== History ==
=== WDBO-FM ===
The station signed on in 1949, as WDBO-FM. It was a sister station to AM station WDBO and was owned by the Orlando Broadcasting Company. The two stations simulcast and were network affiliates of the CBS Radio Network, airing its schedule of dramas, comedies, news, sports, soap operas and game shows during the "Golden Age of Radio". An advertisement in the 1950 edition of Broadcasting Yearbook said that in the competitive Orlando radio market, WDBO-AM-FM had "more listeners than the next three network stations combined".

In July 1954, the Orlando Broadcasting Company added WDBO-TV. As network programming was moving to television, WDBO-AM-FM shifted to a local full service middle of the road format of music, news, sports and talk.

In the late 1960s, the simulcast ended and WDBO-FM switched to an easy listening format, which the Orlando Broadcasting Company described as "good music".

=== Country music WWKA ===
Former logo used until 1997

When Katz Broadcasting bought the radio stations in 1982, WDBO-FM switched to country music, and changed its call letters to WWKA, using the moniker "K92FM". (The WDBO-FM call sign would return to the Orlando market in 2011, on 96.5 MHz). WDBO-TV changed its call letters to WCPX, and is now WKMG-TV, owned by the Graham Media Group.

There was some initial resistance to the country music format. Three broadcasters locked themselves in the studio on December 21, in protest. The situation was resolved peacefully within a few hours.

=== Ownership changes ===
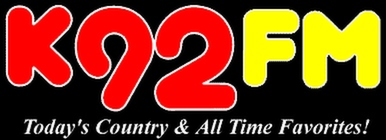
Former logo used from 1997 through December 2011

In August 1986, WWKA and WDBO were sold to the Newhouse Corporation. Newhouse increased WDBO's talk programming and eventually stopped playing music on AM 580, but continued WWKA's country format.

WWKA and WDBO were acquired by Cox Communications in 1997. Cox already owned ABC TV-affiliate WFTV. In 2012, WWKA tweaked its branding, dropping the ‘FM’ from its brand name.
