= WOEX =

Bilingual adult contemporary radio station in Orlando, Florida

Coordinates: 28.5891°N 81.4180°W

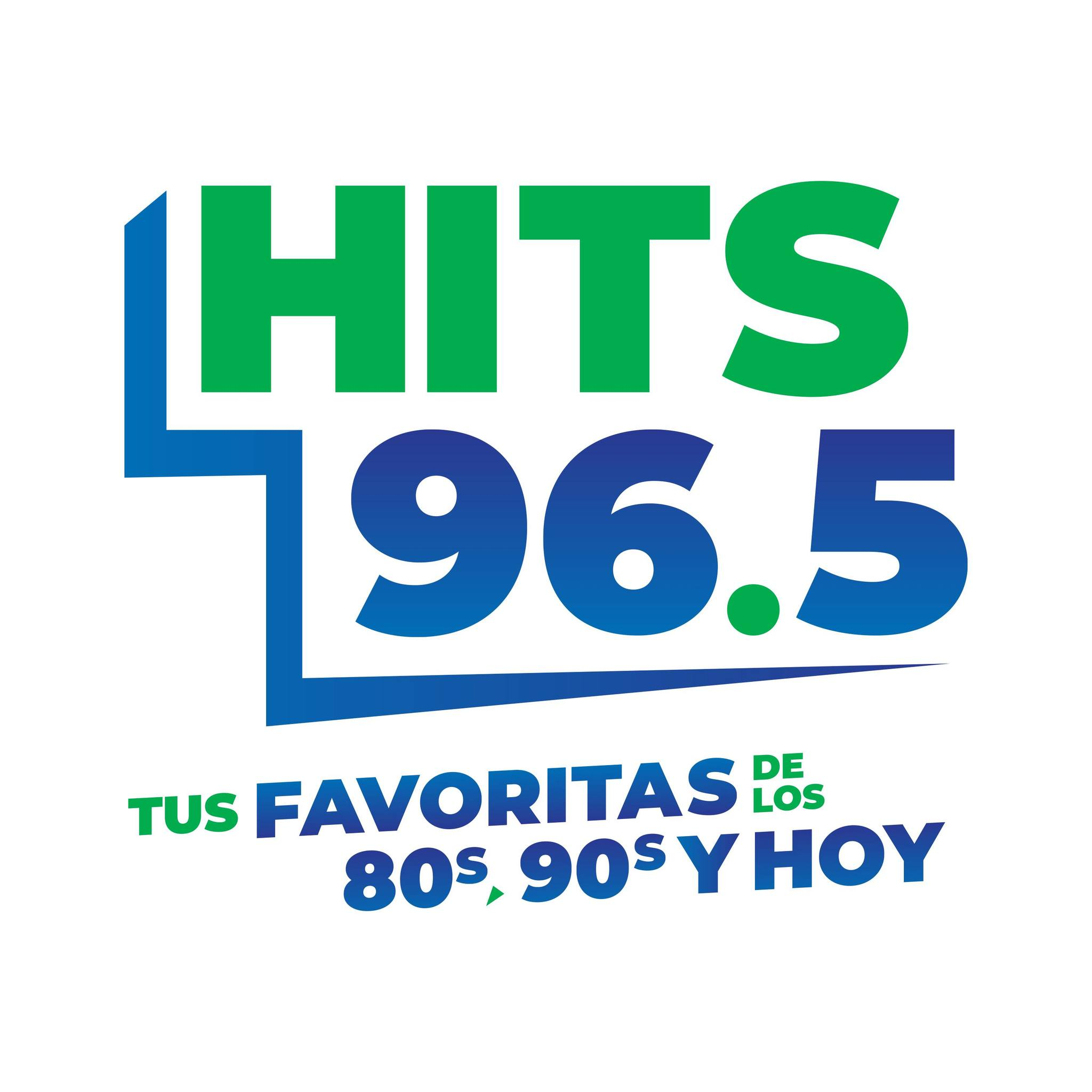
- Orlando, Florida; United States
- Broadcast area: Central Florida
- Frequency: 96.5 MHz (HD Radio)
- RDS: HITS965 ORLANDO
- Branding: Hits 96.5

Programming
- Language: Spanish
- Format: Latin pop–adult contemporary music
- Subchannels: HD2: News/talk (WDBO simulcast)

Ownership
- Owner: Cox Media Group; (Cox Radio, LLC)
- Sister stations: WCFB; WDBO; WMMO; WWKA; part of Cox cluster with TV station WFTV

History
- First air date: 1952; 74 years ago
- Former call signs: WHOO-FM (1948–1987); WHTQ (1987–2011); WDBO-FM (2011–2020)
- Call sign meaning: "Orlando Exitos" (former branding)

Technical information
- Licensing authority: FCC
- Facility ID: 23443
- Class: C
- ERP: 99,000 watts; (100,000 with beam tilt)
- HAAT: 454 meters (1,490 ft)

Links
- Public license information: Public file; LMS
- Webcast: Listen live
- Website: hits965orlando.com

WOEX (96.5 FM, "Hits 96.5") is a commercial radio station in Orlando, Florida. Owned by Cox Media Group, it broadcasts a Spanish-language format featuring Latin pop and English-language adult contemporary music. WOEX's studios and offices are located in Orlando on North John Young Parkway (Route 423).

WOEX has an effective radiated power (ERP) of 99,000 watts (100,000 watts with beam tilt). The transmitter tower is in Bithlo, off Fort Christmas Road (Route 420). WOEX broadcasts in the HD Radio format; the HD2 subchannel carries the news/talk format found on co-owned WDBO.

== History ==
=== Early years ===
The station first signed on in 1952 as WHOO-FM, the FM counterpart to WHOO (now WTLN). The stations were owned by WHOO, Inc., and had their studios in the Fort Gatlin Hotel. WHOO-AM-FM simulcast their programming and were network affiliates of ABC Radio.

=== Beautiful music ===
By the 1960s, WHOO-FM was airing a beautiful music format, no longer simulcast with its parent AM station. WHOO-FM also carried a commercial-free background music service for stores and restaurants, not available to regular FM listeners, but picked up by using special receivers, through a subsidiary communications authority (SCA) subscription service.

WHOO-FM was originally powered at 59,000 watts, using a tower at 1,000 feet, with a signal that extensively covered Central Florida, from Tampa Bay to Daytona Beach. WHOO-FM was one of the first stations in Central Florida to be heard in FM stereo full-time.

=== From country to rock ===
In the 1980s, the subscription music service was sold. With WHOO airing a personality and information-oriented country music format, management decided to flip WHOO-FM to a music intensive country format as "96 Country" in 1984.

In 1987, WHOO-AM-FM were bought by TK Communications, Inc. The AM station remained country, but on March 1, at midnight, WHOO-FM began stunting with non-stop songs from The Beatles. (That same day, the first Beatles CDs were released.) When the all-Beatles stunt ended, the new owners switched the format to adult-oriented album rock. The station's call sign were changed to WHTQ, and it began calling itself "Q 96." In the next couple of years, WHTQ moved to a classic rock format.

=== Cox ownership ===
TK Communications was sold to Granum Communications in 1995 for $12 million. In turn, Granum was acquired by Infinity Broadcasting (which was later renamed CBS Radio, now part of Entercom). Infinity quickly spun off WHOO, WMMO and WHTQ to Cox Radio, in order for Infinity to acquire WCKG in Chicago.

The classic rock format lasted 23 years. On February 18, 2011, at 5 p.m., after playing "Pride (In The Name Of Love)" by U2 and after a commercial set, Cox Radio announced that WHTQ would begin adding new rock songs and recent titles, and modify its moniker to "96 Rock." It began the new format with "Alive" by Pearl Jam. In addition to WHTQ tweaking the classic rock format, WJRR switched back to active rock from alternative rock.

=== Switch to news/talk ===
Just 6 months after the launch of "96 Rock", on August 19, 2011, at 5 a.m., after playing "Sad but True" by Metallica, WHTQ flipped to a simulcast of co-owned news/talk-formatted WDBO. The change followed a decrease in WHTQ's ratings, and a decision to give WDBO's talk format a wider audience by putting it on the powerful 100,000 watt FM signal, which switched its call sign to WDBO-FM. The rock format at first continued on the station's HD Radio signal, 96.5-HD2, for a few months after the switch before being discontinued altogether.

WDBO-AM-FM branded itself as "FM-96.5 News-Talk WDBO" for much of 2012, to emphasize its new availability on FM radio.

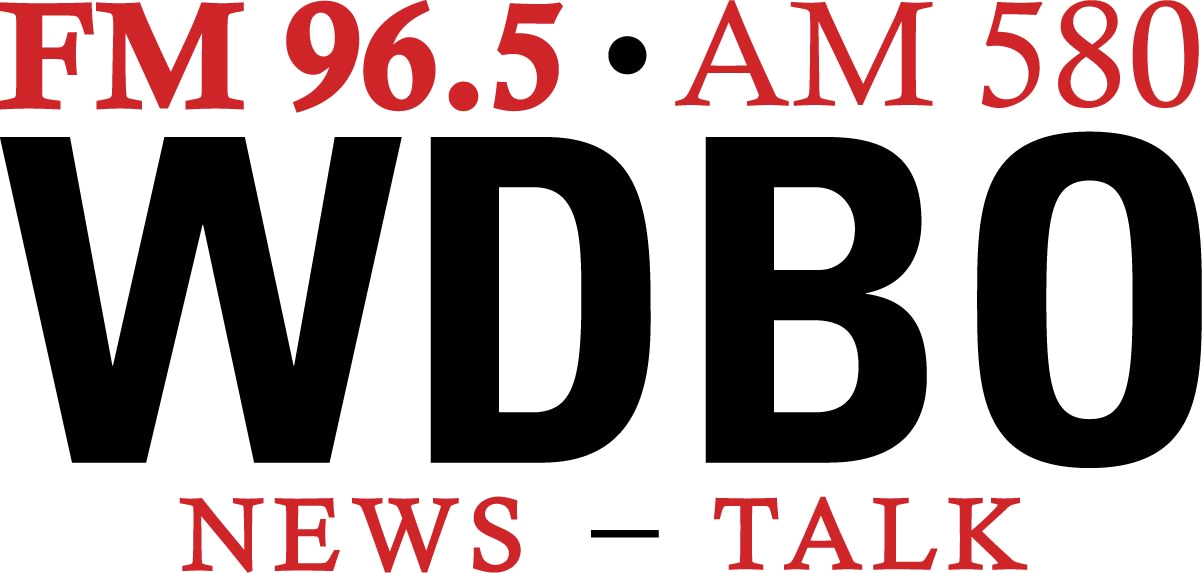
Former logo of the radio station, used from August 19, 2011 through December 2011

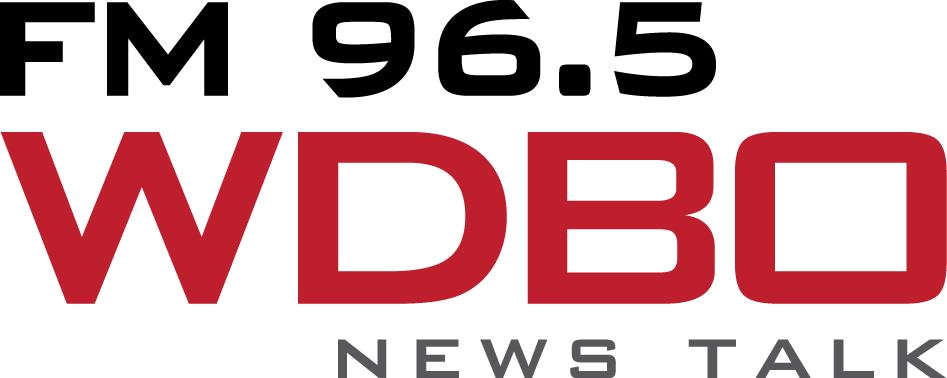
Former logo from 2012 to 2013. Another logo was used from 2013 to 2020.

Programming changes occurred in October 2012, when Clark Howard rejoined the station's lineup after an absence of several years. The Neal Boortz Show was shortened to two hours and aired from 9 a.m. to 11 a.m., which pushed up the local Mel Robbins Show to the 11 a.m.-1 p.m. timeslot. These moves coincided with a change in branding to NewsTalk 96.5 WDBO.

Shortly afterward, on November 12, 2012, the news/talk format became FM-only, as WDBO relaunched as a sports radio station affiliated with ESPN Radio. WDBO became the flagship station for the Orlando Magic Radio Network, with WDBO-FM also simulcasting the games.

On April 29, 2013, sweeping changes were made to the station as it was rebranded News 96.5: "Orlando′s New 24-Hour News, Weather and Traffic." From then until 2015, all on-air references to the call sign WDBO were dropped, aside from hourly IDs. The call letters were slowly re-integrated into the branding over the months of October and November 2015.

A weekday segment known as "The Three Big Things You Need to Know" was introduced at approximately :15 and :45 past the hour. In addition, Orlando Magic games were heard on the AM station only, and news hours were added at noon and 6 p.m. In 2015, the station added Dana Loesch's syndicated talk show to the lineup.

=== Spanish-language music ===
Former logo from 2020 to 2024

On June 24, 2020, Cox Radio announced that WDBO-FM's news/talk programming would relocate back to WDBO-AM. An FM translator, 107.3 W297BB, would begin simulcasting WDBO. Five days later, WDBO-FM would flip to Spanish CHR as Éxitos 96.5 (the "Éxitos" branding was previously on W297BB, which was used for a Spanish hot adult contemporary format). On July 14, 2020, WDBO-FM changed its call sign to WOEX to match the Éxitos branding.

On October 17, 2024, WOEX flipped from Spanish CHR to a hybrid Latin pop/English-language adult contemporary format as Hits 96.5, modeled after Miami's WMIA-FM. In November 2025, WOEX announced that it would air Christmas music for the holiday season while maintaining its Spanish-language presentation, promoting itself as the "first" bilingual Christmas station.
