= WDBO (AM) =

- Orlando, Florida; United States
- Broadcast area: Greater Orlando
- Frequency: 580 kHz
- Branding: WDBO

Programming
- Format: News/talk
- Network: ABC News Radio
- Affiliations: Premiere Networks; Compass Media Networks; WFTV; Fox News Radio

Ownership
- Owner: Cox Media Group; (Cox Radio, LLC)
- Sister stations: WCFB; WOEX; WMMO; WWKA; WFTV; WRDQ

History
- First air date: May 24, 1924
- Former frequencies: 1250 kHz (1927); 1040 kHz (1927–1928); 620 kHz (1928–1929); 1120 kHz (1929–1932)
- Call sign meaning: "Daytona Beach-Orlando"

Technical information
- Licensing authority: FCC
- Facility ID: 48726
- Class: B
- Power: 5,000 watts
- Transmitter coordinates: 28°37′12″N 81°24′34.3″W
- Translator: 107.3 W297BB (Orlando)
- Repeater: 96.5 WOEX-HD2 (Orlando)

Links
- Public license information: Public file; LMS
- Webcast: Listen live; Listen live (via TuneIn)
- Website: www.wdbo.com

WDBO (580 AM) is a commercial radio station broadcasting a talk radio format. Licensed to Orlando, Florida, the station is owned by Cox Media Group. The studios and offices are located on North John Young Parkway in Orlando.

WDBO is powered at 5,000 watts. By day, its signal is non-directional. At night, to protect other stations on AM 580, it uses a directional antenna with a two-tower array. The transmitter is off West Kennedy Boulevard in Maitland. Programming is also heard on 250-watt FM translator W297BB at 107.3 MHz.

== History ==
Former logo used from 1997 through December 2001. Stylized similarly to the current logo for one-time sister station KFI in Los Angeles.

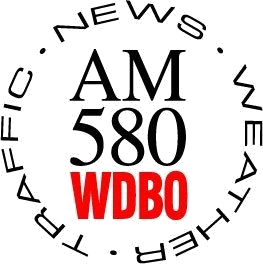
Former logo used until 2012

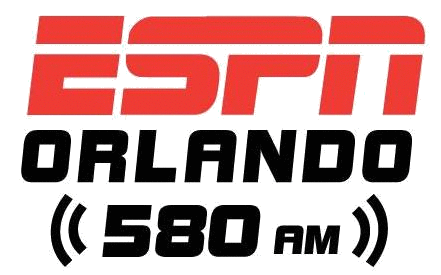
Former logo from 2012 to June 2020

=== Early years ===
WDBO is Orlando's oldest radio station, signing on the air on May 24, 1924. It was first licensed to Rollins College in Winter Park. In its early years, it used a number of frequencies, but by 1933, it settled on 580 kHz. In 1935, it got a boost in power from 250 watts to 1,000 watts. It was owned by the Orlando Broadcasting Company, and was a network affiliate of CBS Radio. WDBO carried the CBS line up of dramas, comedies, news, sports, soap operas, game shows, and big band broadcasts during the "Golden Age of Radio".

In 1949, WDBO-FM (92.3 FM) was put on the air as a simulcast of WDBO. Five years later, WDBO-TV came on the air, the first television station in Central Florida, matching its radio cousin as a primary CBS television affiliate. In 1982, the firm that owned WDBO-AM-FM-TV, The Outlet Company, sold the radio stations to Katz Broadcasting. (The TV station became WCPX in 1982, and has been WKMG-TV since 1998.) When the stations were sold, WDBO-FM was re-formatted as a country music station, "K92FM", with the call sign WWKA.

=== MOR, AC and talk ===
As network programming moved from radio to television in the 1950s, WDBO switched to a full-service middle of the road format of popular adult music, news, and sports. The station also joined ABC News Radio and slowly added more talk radio programs. By the 1980s, "58 WDBO" began to scale back on MOR music, and in 1984, the station dropped MOR entirely, switching to adult contemporary music, along with news, information and sports. The change in music came shortly after Leesburg's WHLY switched from its adult contemporary format to Top 40.

When the 1990s began, WDBO was airing a mix of news, talk and adult contemporary music. In March 1991, the station dropped music entirely and it became "NewsTalk 580 WDBO". For years, it was Greater Orlando's highest-rated AM news/talk station. In 1997, WDBO and WWKA were acquired by Cox Radio. In August 2011, Cox ended the classic rock format on WHTQ (96.5 FM), and gave it the call sign WDBO-FM, becoming a simulcast of WDBO. (WDBO's talk programming was initially heard on that station's HD-2 subchannel beginning in late February 2008.) The news/talk station eventually re-branded, using the FM frequency exclusively as "NewsTalk 96-5 WDBO".

=== Switch to sports ===
On November 12, 2012, the simulcast ended when WDBO re-launched as a sports radio station affiliated with ESPN Radio, while WDBO-FM continued the news/talk programming on its own. ESPN Radio had been dropped previously by WHOO (1080 AM), which switched its affiliation to NBC Sports Radio.

WDBO carried the full ESPN Radio schedule, except for a local program on weekday afternoons hosted by Scott Anez. WDBO remained the flagship radio station of the Orlando Magic basketball team until iHeartMedia's WYGM (740 AM) became the home of the Magic at the start of the 2018–2019 season.

=== Return to talk ===
On June 24, 2020, Cox Radio announced that WDBO-FM would flip to a Spanish-language hot adult contemporary hits format as WOEX, "Exitos 96.5". WDBO's news/talk programming concurrently moved back to 580 AM, replacing the sports format. To give listeners in Orlando and its adjacent communities the option to hear WDBO programming on FM, Cox added a simulcast via FM translator W297BB (107.3 FM) on June 29. With the addition of the translator, the station rebranded as "WDBO 107.3 FM and 580 AM".

In September 2021, Cox Media announced reductions to WDBO's staff. Morning anchor Ray Caputo, evening anchor Tony Marino and late morning talk host Darrell Moody were released. The noon news hour was also replaced with talk programming.

== Programming ==
Weekdays begin with a local information and interview show, Orlando's Morning News, hosted by Scott Anez and anchored by Greg Rhodes, with reporting from Isaac Abdelmessih, Michelle Wargo, and Hayden Wiggs. The rest of the weekday schedule is made up of nationally syndicated talk programs: The Sean Hannity Show, Brian Kilmeade and Friends, The Erik Erickson Show, Markley, Van Camp & Robbins and Fox Across America with Jimmy Failla. WDBO reporter Laurel Lee hosts the evening newscasts.

Weekends include shows on money, health, law, pets, home improvement, gardening, cars and food. A technology show with Kim Komando is heard Sunday evenings. Some weekend hours are paid brokered programming. Most hours begin with world and national news from ABC News Radio.

There had been a two-hour-long local news block at 5 p.m. until 2024. A local sports show aired in the evening until 2022, Live, Local and Loud, with Nick Gryniewicz and Jerry Daniels. Both were replaced with syndicated talk programs.
