= WTLN (AM) =

Christian radio station in Orlando

- Orlando, Florida; United States
- Broadcast area: Greater Orlando
- Frequency: 990 kHz
- Branding: AM 990 and FM 101.5 The Word

Programming
- Language: English
- Format: Christian talk and teaching
- Affiliations: Salem Radio Network

Ownership
- Owner: Salem Media Group; (Salem Communications Holding Corporation)
- Sister stations: WORL

History
- First air date: December 5, 1947; 78 years ago
- Former call signs: WHOO (1947–1985); WMMA (1985–1987); WHOO (1987–2001); WDYZ (2001–2019)

Technical information
- Licensing authority: FCC
- Facility ID: 23442
- Class: B
- Power: 50,000 watts (day); 14,000 watts (night)
- Transmitter coordinates: 28°34′27″N 81°27′46″W
- Translator: 101.5 W268CT (Orlando)

Links
- Public license information: Public file; LMS
- Webcast: Listen live; Listen live (via Audacy); Listen live (via iHeartRadio)
- Website: thewordorlando.com

WTLN (990 kHz) is a commercial AM radio station located in Orlando, Florida. It is owned by the Salem Media Group and it airs a Christian talk and teaching radio format. The offices and studios are on Lake View Drive in Altamonte Springs. Some of the national religious leaders heard on WTLN include David Jeremiah, Chuck Swindoll, Jim Daly, John MacArthur and Charles Stanley. Hosts pay for 30- to 60-minute segments on WTLN and can use the time to seek donations to their ministries. WTLN is known as "AM 990 and FM 101.5 The Word".

WTLN broadcasts by day with 50,000 watts, the maximum power for AM stations in the United States, covering much of Central Florida. It uses a directional antenna at all times, and must protect co-channel WMYM in Miami. At night, when AM band signals travel further, power is reduced to 14,000 watts, with its signal directional towards the east, to protect Canadian clear channel station CBW in Winnipeg. The transmitter is off Park Hamilton Boulevard in Pine Hills. Programming is also heard on 225-watt FM translator 101.5 W268CT in Orlando.

== History ==
=== Early years ===
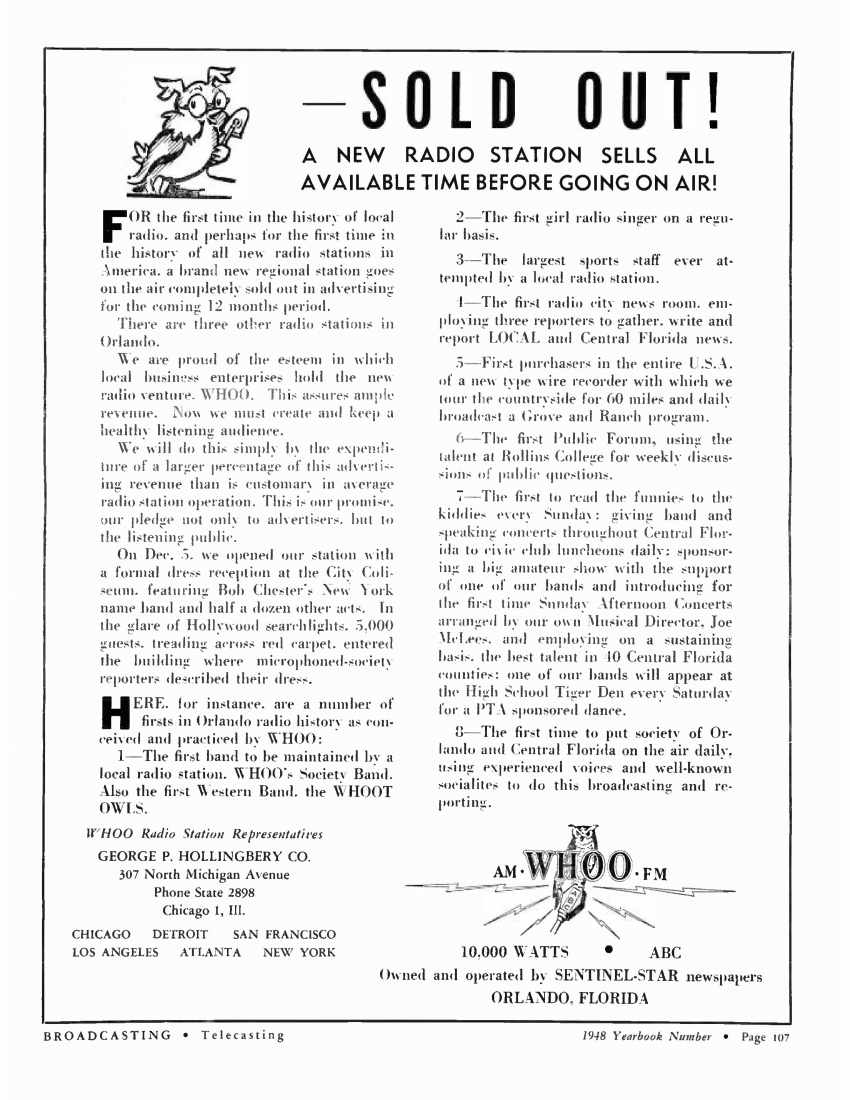
WHOO advertisement in the 1948 Broadcasting Yearbook.

On December 5, 1947, WHOO first signed on the air. It was the ABC Radio network affiliate for Orlando and was co-owned with the Sentinel Star newspaper. The studios were in the Fort Catelin Hotel.

An advertisement in the 1948 Broadcasting Yearbook stated that WHOO celebrated its debut broadcast with 5,000 guests, a New York dance band and a full-time "girl singer". It boasted that it had Orlando's first city room to gather local and Florida news stories and the largest sports staff. A short time later, it added FM station WHOO-FM (now WOEX).

In the late 1950s, as network programming moved from radio to television, WHOO shifted to a top 40 music format and was a top-rated station in the market until slipping behind upstart WLOF "Channel 95" in the mid-1960s. WHOO then switched to country music in 1968, and continued with this format until 1987, when the station switched its call sign to WMMA "Magic 99". airing a satellite-fed soft adult contemporary format from the Satellite Music Network. A short time later, it changed to oldies.

=== Standards, country and rock ===
A succession of formats followed over the next several years: the station was briefly WHTQ in 1988, simulcasting the album rock format of WHTQ-FM. It returned to the WHOO call sign with an adult standards format known as "The Music of Your Life". Within a year, it changed to classic country in 1989, and then returned to simulcasting WHTQ-FM's rock music (although still as WHOO) from 1990 to 1993.

On December 4, 1993, WHOO returned to adult standards, this time using the syndicated "Stardust" format from ABC Radio.

=== Radio Disney ===
In 2001, WHOO was acquired by the ABC, Inc. subsidiary of The Walt Disney Company for $5 million. Walt Disney World is located in Orlando, so the decision was made by the company to flip WHOO to the children's/contemporary hit radio format as the unofficial flagship station. The station became WDYZ as a Radio Disney owned and operated station, beginning the format on February 2, and provides the service throughout the Disney World area (The DYZ stood for "Disney"). The station was also simulcast on channel 14 in Disney resort TVs. The standards format and WHOO call sign were shifted onto AM 1080 in Kissimmee.

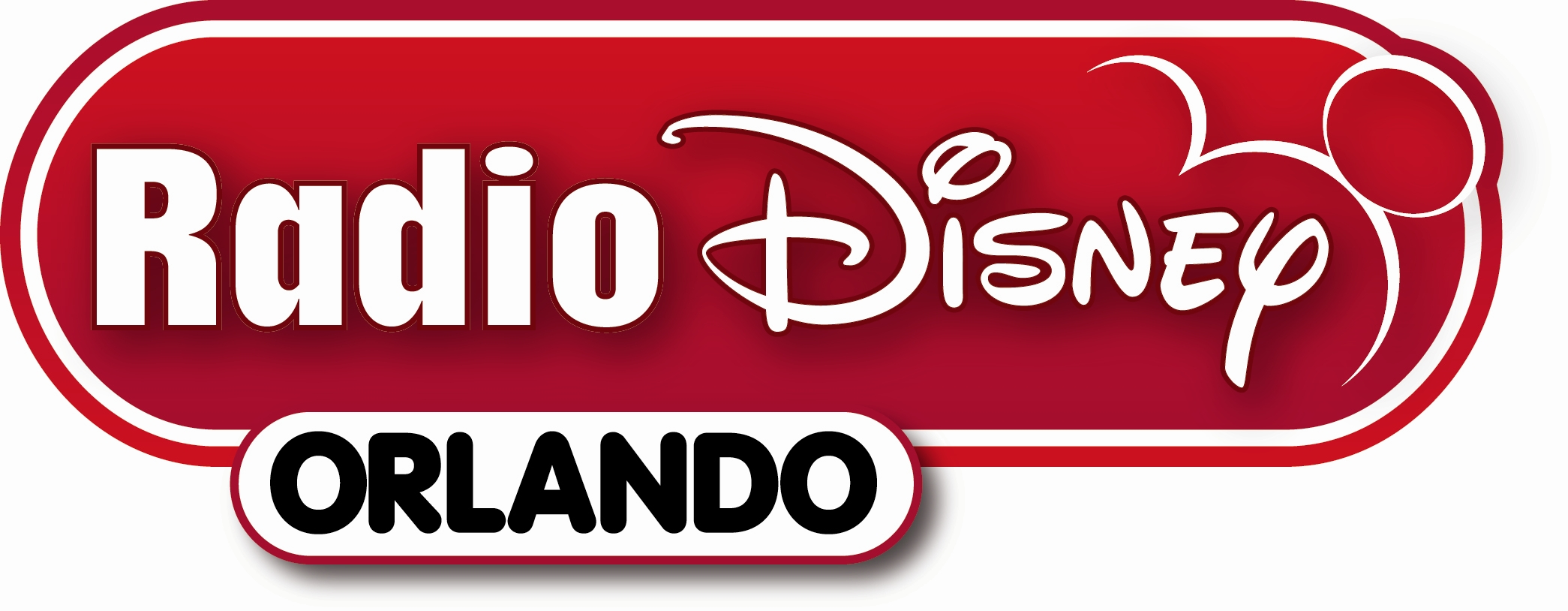
Final Radio Disney logo for WDYZ.

On August 13, 2014, Disney put WDYZ and 22 other Radio Disney stations up for sale, to focus on digital distribution of the Radio Disney network. On December 15, Radio Disney Group filed to sell WDYZ to the Pennsylvania Media Associates, Inc. Pennsylvania Media is a subsidiary of the Salem Media Group. The FCC granted the sale on February 10, 2015.

=== Salem ownership ===
On March 10, Salem Media CEO Ed Atsinger revealed that WDYZ would be the eighth company-owned station to carry Salem's "Radio Luz" Spanish Christian radio format. On March 18, WDYZ dropped the Radio Disney programming and went silent. The sale was consummated on March 27. On April 13, WDYZ returned to the air with a Spanish Christian format, branded as "La Nueva 990".

On August 5, 2019, WDYZ flipped to English-language Christian talk and teaching, branded as "The Word". The flip was part of a Salem Media shuffle of its Orlando stations; WORL (660 AM), the home of Salem's conservative talk format, was sold to JVC Broadcasting, while Salem shifted WORL's programming and call sign to 950 AM, and the WTLN callsigns and Christian talk and teaching format moved up the dial to 990 AM.
