= WDYZ (AM) =

Radio station in Altamonte Springs–Orlando, Florida

Coordinates: 28°41′35″N 81°20′57″W

- Altamonte Springs, Florida; United States
- Broadcast area: Greater Orlando
- Frequency: 660 kHz
- Branding: Poder 660

Programming
- Format: Regional Mexican

Ownership
- Owner: Norsan Media; (Norsan Media, LLC)
- Sister stations: WFYY

History
- First air date: 1986 (as WGOR at 650 in Christmas, Florida)
- Former call signs: WGNZ (1984–1986, CP); WGOR (1986–1989); WORL (1989–2019)
- Former frequencies: 650 kHz (1986–1990s)
- Call sign meaning: call sign transferred from 990 AM, formerly owned by Disney

Technical information
- Licensing authority: FCC
- Facility ID: 21810
- Class: B
- Power: 3,500 watts day 1,000 watts night
- Repeater: 103.1 WFYY-HD3 (Windermere)

Links
- Public license information: Public file; LMS
- Website: poder660.com

WDYZ (660 kHz) is a commercial AM radio station licensed to Altamonte Springs, Florida, and serving Greater Orlando. The station is owned by Norsan Media, and airs a regional Mexican radio format. The studios and offices are in Maitland, Florida.

WDYZ's transmitter is off Charles Street in Longwood. The station uses a three-tower array. It transmits with 3,500 watts by day, but because AM 660 is a clear channel frequency reserved for WFAN in New York City, WDYZ must reduce power to 1,000 watts at night. The station uses a directional antenna at all times.

== History ==
The station first signed on the air in 1986 as WGOR. Originally it broadcast on 650 kHz and was licensed to Christmas, Florida. WGOR was a 10,000-watt daytimer. It carried a Christian radio format.

In the 1990s, the station was acquired by Floyco, Inc. It changed its call sign to WORL to represent Orlando. It moved one spot up the dial to AM 660 and changed its city of license to Altamonte Springs. The move was designed to allow the station to broadcast around the clock as prior to this, overnight broadcasting was not possible as this would have caused severe interference to 50,000 watt clear-channel station WSM AM 650 in Nashville.

In 2001, WORL was acquired by James Crystal, Inc., which also owned stations in the Miami and West Palm Beach radio markets. Crystal programmed a mix of talk, business news and religion. But the company ran into financial problems several years later. In 2006, Salem Communications acquired the station, which would air its own lineup of conservative talk programming.

In July 2019, it was announced that JVC Broadcasting, owners of country station WOTW, would acquire WORL and its FM translator for $900,000. Salem moved the conservative talk format to WTLN (950 AM) on August 19, 2019, and the station began stunting by redirecting listeners to 950 AM on a loop. As Salem retained rights to the WORL call sign, the WDYZ call sign from 990 AM was swapped to 660 AM. JVC announced that it planned to launch a new hot talk format on the station, Florida Man Radio, which officially launched on September 9, featuring hosts like Bubba the Love Sponge, Scott Ledger, and The Shannon Burke Show (which had been displaced by WYAY in Atlanta after its sale and conversion to K-Love).

In November 2019, JVC announced plans to syndicate the Florida Man Radio programming state-wide, adding Gainesville sister station WYGC to the network beginning November 11, 2019. The station also announced that Ed Tyll would join the network as midday host.

On February 8, 2023, WDYZ changed its format from hot talk to sports, branded as "ESPN 660", with programming from ESPN Radio around the clock.

On June 13, 2024, JVC Broadcasting announced it would sell their Orlando stations, including WDYZ and simulcasting translator 105.5 W288CJ, to Norsan Media for an undisclosed amount, later revealed to be $6 million. The station will flip to a Spanish-language format upon the sale's closure, as Norsan focuses on such formats on their stations nationwide. The following day at 6:00 pm, the station began stunting with an unbranded regional Mexican radio format. It was rumored to use the "La Raza" branding used by other Norsan Media stations with the radio format. The sale was finalized on August 30, 2024. The station's format officially launched on October 1, 2024, under the “Poder 660” branding.
