= WORL (AM) =

Radio station in Orlando

- Orlando, Florida; United States
- Broadcast area: Greater Orlando
- Frequency: 950 kHz
- Branding: AM 950 and FM 94.9 The Answer

Programming
- Format: Conservative talk radio
- Affiliations: Salem Radio Network; Townhall

Ownership
- Owner: Salem Media Group; (Salem Communications Holding Corporation)
- Sister stations: WTLN

History
- First air date: November 26, 1940; 85 years ago
- Former call signs: WLOF (1940–1984); WBJW (1984–1989); WOMX (1989–1995); WZKD (1995–1998); WTLN (1998–2019); WDYZ (2019)
- Former frequencies: 1200 kHz (1940–1941); 1230 kHz (1941–1949)
- Call sign meaning: "Orlando"

Technical information
- Licensing authority: FCC
- Facility ID: 48731
- Class: B
- Power: 12,000 watts day; 5,000 watts night
- Transmitter coordinates: 28°32′8.00″N 81°26′56.00″W
- Translator: 94.9 W235CR (Orlando)

Links
- Public license information: Public file; LMS
- Webcast: Listen Live
- Website: theanswerorlando.com

WORL (950 kHz) is a commercial AM radio station licensed to Orlando, Florida, United States. It serves Central Florida, including the Greater Orlando radio market. It airs a conservative talk radio format and is known as "AM 950 and FM 94.9 The Answer". WORL is owned by the Salem Media Group with studios and offices on Lake View Drive in Altamonte Springs.

By day, WORL transmits with 12,000 watts using a non-directional antenna. Because radio waves travel farther at night, WORL reduces power to 5,000 watts after sunset to avoid interfering with other stations on AM 950 and uses a directional antenna with a five-tower array. The transmitter is off Ring Road in Orlando. Programming is also heard on a 225-watt FM translator, 94.9 W235CR in Orlando.

== Programming ==
WORL carries most of the nationally syndicated Salem Radio Network hosts: Hugh Hewitt, Mike Gallagher, Dennis Prager, Jay Sekulow, Sebastian Gorka, Brandon Tatum and Charlie Kirk. A local afternoon drive time show is heard, hosted by Christopher Hart.

Weekends feature shows on money, health, gardening, guns and old time radio shows. Some weekend shows are paid brokered programming. WORL is also the Orlando area affiliate for the Tampa Bay Rays Radio Network. Most hours begin with news from Townhall, a subsidiary of Salem Media.

== History ==
=== WLOF ===
The station began as WLOF, Orlando's second radio station. It signed on the air on October 26, 1940. WLOF broadcast with 250 watts on 1200 kHz. It was owned by Hazelwood, Inc., and was an NBC Blue Network affiliate, carrying its schedule of dramas, comedies, news, sports, soap operas, game shows and big band broadcasts during the "Golden Age of Radio". With the enactment of the North American Regional Broadcasting Agreement (NARBA) in 1941, it moved to 1230 kHz.

The switch to 950 kHz was completed in 1949. It continued to broadcast under the call sign WLOF until 1983. During the 1960s and 1970s, WLOF was the leading Top 40 station in Orlando. The callsign WLOF are now used by a Catholic radio station in Buffalo, New York. In 1983, the call letters were changed to WCOT. The new format featured adult standards and big band music.

=== WBJW and WOMX ===
During the 1980s and early ’90s, the station simulcast two FM stations, both on 105.1 MHz. From 1984 to 1989, it was WBJW, airing a Top 40 format. From 1989 to 1995, the station's callsign was WOMX. The station aired the same programming as WOMX-FM, playing hot adult contemporary music.

=== WZKD ===
Owner NewCity Communications changed the station’s format to children's radio, affiliating with the Radio AAHS network on December 15, 1994. The FCC granted the station's call sign change to WZKD on April 7, 1995.

The week of April 14, WZKD's morning program, Jammin' Jo Jo, increased its length by an hour. The station then built new permanent studios that would allow for tours, which the station expected to be in by mid-May. They hired local kids for specials and features and added Tommy's Clubhouse, a local weekend show. The week of August 4, the station opened up its studios up for visitors. Given Orlando's past with children's radio, even before NewCity launched a television advertising campaign in August, the station was in the top five AAHS stations in calls to the network.

In January 1997, Cox Radio, Inc. received FTC approval of its purchase of Newcity Communications, including WZKD, initiated in May 1996. On January 30, 1998, Radio AAHS stopped broadcasting.

=== WTLN ===
In 1998, the station was bought for $500,000 by TM2, Inc. The call sign was switched to WTLN and the format flipped to Christian talk and teaching. In 2005, the station changed hands again. The station was sold to Salem Communications the largest owner of Christian radio stations for $9.5 million. Salem kept the Christian format in place, but added many of the national religious hosts found on other Salem stations.

For a time, programming on WTLN was simulcast on WHIM (1520 AM) in Apopka. WHIM is now WNDO, airing a Haitian Creole format; it is no longer owned by Salem Media.

=== WORL ===
On August 5, 2019, WTLN dropped its Christian talk and teaching format and began stunting with a continuous loop of announcements redirected listeners to 990 AM and FM 101.5, with the WTLN call sign moving to 990 AM. 950 AM took on 990's former WDYZ call sign the next day.

On August 19, 2019, WDYZ ended stunting and picked up "The Answer" conservative talk format, which moved from 660 AM. That station was acquired by JVC Media, owners of country music station WOTW; JVC also acquired the WDYZ call sign. AM 950's call sign became WORL, which had previously been used for the conservative talk format on AM 660.
