= FanDuel Sports Network Florida =

Regional sports network

- Type: Regional sports network
- Country: United States
- Broadcast area: Florida; Georgia; South Alabama; Nationwide (via satellite)
- Network: FanDuel Sports Network
- Headquarters: Fort Lauderdale, Florida, U.S.

Programming
- Languages: English; Spanish (via SAP)
- Picture format: 720p (HDTV); 480i (SDTV)

Ownership
- Owner: Main Street Sports Group
- Sister channels: FanDuel Sports Network Sun

History
- Launched: December 29, 1987 (38 years ago)
- Closed: September 30, 2026 (5 days ago)
- Former names: SportsChannel Florida (1987–2000); Fox Sports Net Florida (2000–2004); FSN Florida (2004–2008); Fox Sports Florida (2008–2021); Bally Sports Florida (2021–2024)

Links
- Website: www.fanduelsportsnetwork.com

Availability (Some events may air on overflow feed FanDuel Sports Network Florida Plus due to event conflicts)

Streaming media
- FanDuel Sports Network app: www.fanduelsportsnetwork.com/mvpd/login (U.S. cable internet subscribers only; requires login from participating providers to stream content; some events may not be available due to league rights restrictions)
- DirecTV Stream: Internet Protocol television
- FuboTV: Internet Protocol television

FanDuel Sports Network Florida was an American regional sports network owned by Main Street Sports Group (formerly Diamond Sports Group) and operates as an affiliate of FanDuel Sports Network. The channel broadcast local sports coverage in the state of Florida, with a focus on professional sports teams based in Miami, Tampa and Orlando.

FanDuel Sports Network Florida maintained production facilities and offices located in Fort Lauderdale, alongside sister network FanDuel Sports Network Sun. The channel was available on cable television providers throughout Florida, and in parts of southern Alabama and Georgia; it is also available nationwide on satellite via DirecTV.

== History ==
SportsChannel Florida logo, from 1995 to 2000

FanDuel Sports Network Florida was launched on December 29, 1987, as SportsChannel Florida. It was originally owned by Rainbow Media (a subsidiary of Cablevision Systems Corporation), and was the fourth regional network of SportsChannel America. The network originally featured coverage of local college teams, holding the broadcast rights to televise select games from the University of Florida, Florida State University, University of Miami, University of South Florida and Jacksonville University. In addition to national SportsChannel programming, the channel also showed a combined 100 baseball games that featured the New York Yankees and New York Mets from SportsChannel New York, and Chicago White Sox games broadcast by SportsChannel Chicago.

Fox Sports Florida logo, used from 2008 to 2012.

In the spring of 1988, SportsChannel Florida obtained the regional cable television rights to broadcast NBA games from the Miami Heat, effective with the 1988–89 season. In 1992, SportsChannel lost the television contract to the Heat to then-rival Sunshine Network. Heat games would return to the channel in the late 1990s when both networks came under the ownership of Fox Sports parent News Corporation.

In 1996, Florida Panthers owner Wayne Huizenga purchased a 70% controlling interest in SportsChannel Florida, with Rainbow Media (by that time, a joint venture between Cablevision and NBC) retaining a minority 30% interest. That led Huizenga to move the NHL franchise's game telecasts from Sunshine Network to SportsChannel Florida for the 1996–97 season. The following year in 1997, SportsChannel Florida obtained the rights to the Florida Marlins – also owned by Huizenga – which moved 35 games (half the schedule) from the Sunshine Network in that year's Major League Baseball season, with all games moving the following season. In 1998, SportsChannel Florida also gained the regional cable rights to the Tampa Bay Devil Rays Major League Baseball expansion team.

Former Fox Sports Florida logo, used from 2012 to 2021

Unlike the other networks that were members of the SportsChannel America chain, Huizenga's control of SportsChannel Florida prevented the channel from joining Fox Sports Net. Shortly after Cablevision and Fox Sports announced the merger in 1997, Cablevision ceased production of its national SportsChannel programming in favor of Fox Sports Net's programming (though the networks would not officially rebrand until early the next year). Since SportsChannel Florida did not have rights to the Fox Sports Net programming, SportsChannel Florida made an affiliation agreement with CNN/SI to carry its programming instead. Cablevision finally repurchased Huizenga's share of the network in November 1999. The network was relaunched as Fox Sports Net Florida on March 1, 2000, making it the last SportsChannel network to adopt the Fox Sports Net brand. At this time Fox Sports Net programming was moved from the Sunshine Network (which Fox only had a minority-interest in) and CNN/SI programming was phased out.

In February 2005, News Corporation acquired Cablevision's ownership stakes in Fox Sports Florida and Fox Sports Ohio, following an asset trade in which Fox sold its interest in Madison Square Garden and the arena's NBA and NHL team tenants, the New York Knicks and New York Rangers, to Cablevision, in exchange for acquiring sole ownership of the two Fox Sports regional networks. News Corporation spun off most of its entertainment properties into 21st Century Fox in July 2013.

Former logo as Bally Sports Florida, used from 2021 to 2024.

On December 14, 2017, as part of a merger between both companies, The Walt Disney Company announced plans to acquire all 22 regional Fox Sports networks from 21st Century Fox, including Fox Sports Florida. However, on June 27, 2018, the Justice Department ordered their divestment under antitrust grounds, citing Disney's ownership of ESPN. On May 3, 2019, Sinclair Broadcast Group and Entertainment Studios (through their joint venture, Diamond Sports Group) bought Fox Sports Networks from The Walt Disney Company for $10.6 billion. The deal closed on August 22, 2019. On November 17, 2020, Sinclair announced an agreement with casino operator Bally's Corporation to serve as a new naming rights partner for the FSN channels. Sinclair announced the new Bally Sports branding for the channels on January 27, 2021. On March 31, 2021, coinciding with the start of the 2021 Major League Baseball season the next day, Fox Sports Florida and sister network Fox Sports Sun rebranded as Bally Sports Florida and Bally Sports Sun, which resulted in 18 other Regional Sports Networks renamed Bally Sports in their respective regions. The first live sporting event on Bally Sports Florida was the Marlins home opener against the Rays on April 1.

=== Bankruptcy ===
On March 14, 2023, Diamond Sports, the parent company of Bally Sports, filed for Chapter 11 bankruptcy, 30 days after they failed to make a $140M interest payment. Diamond’s first-lien lenders will not be affected as part of the restructuring support agreement, but other creditors will convert their debt into equity. Diamond also plans to separate from Sinclair and become an entirely new entity.

On July 2, 2024, Bally Sports Florida and the Florida Panthers of the National Hockey League mutually agreed to terminate their broadcasting contract early. That same day, the Panthers announced a new broadcast deal with the E. W. Scripps Company's Scripps Sports, which would put games over-the-air on Scripps-owned WSFL-TV in Miami and WHDT in West Palm Beach.

On October 16, 2024, it was revealed in a court filing that Diamond had reached a new sponsorship agreement with FanDuel Group, under which it intended to rebrand Bally Sports as the FanDuel Sports Network; on October 18, 2024, Diamond officially announced the rebranding, which took effect October 21. Under the agreement, FanDuel has the option to take a minority equity stake of up to 5% once Diamond Sports exits bankruptcy. The branding is downplayed during programming related to high school sports. After losing all of its rights to professional teams in early 2026, the network finally shut down on September 30, 2026.

== Programming ==
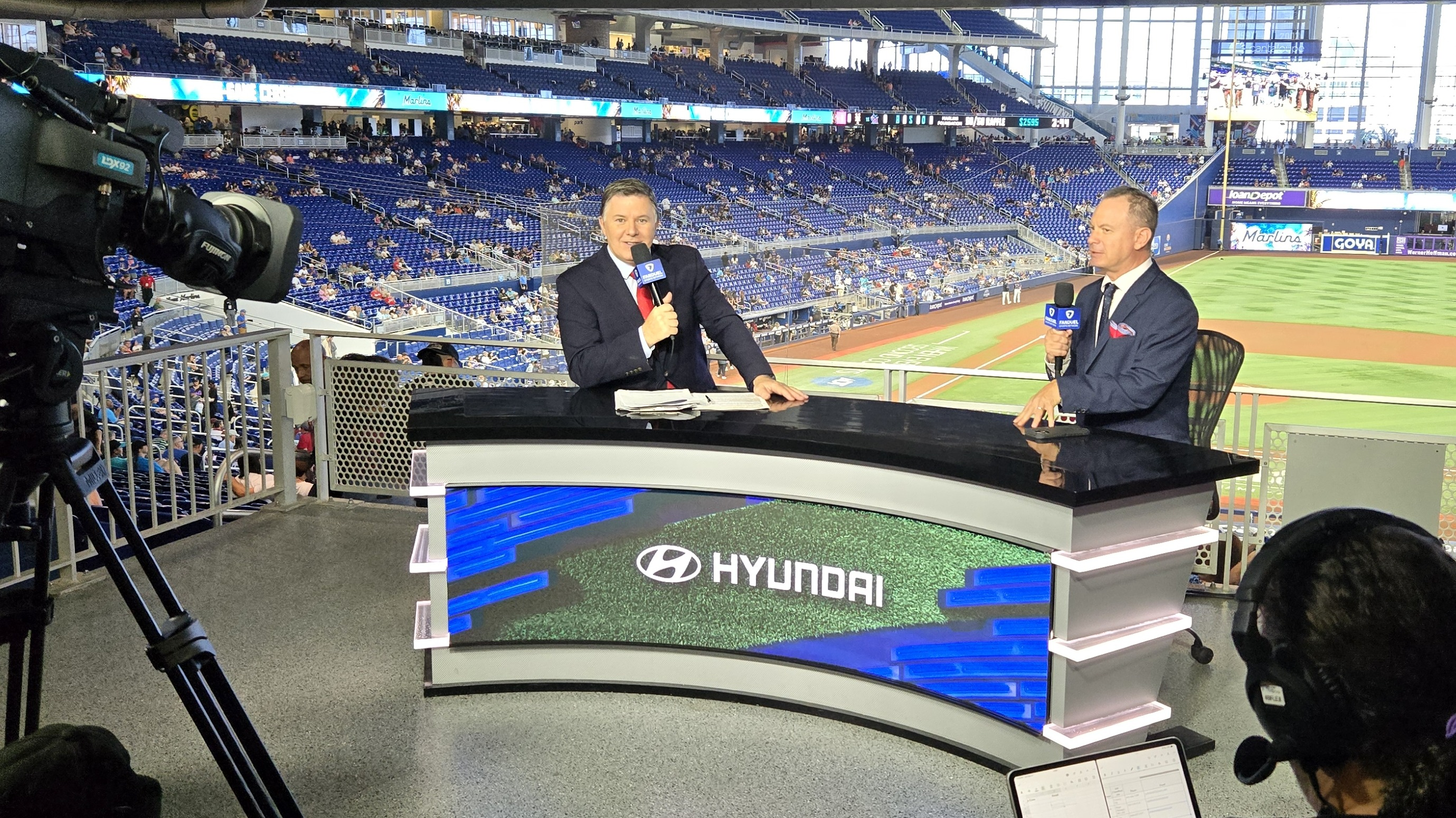
A Miami Marlins pregame show being filmed at loanDepot Park in 2025

FanDuel Sports Network Florida held the regional cable television rights to the Orlando Magic of the National Basketball Association.

FanDuel Sports Network Florida shares the broadcast rights to the aforementioned professional sports teams with FanDuel Sports Network Sun (with Miami Heat games transmitted to cable providers in South Florida, and Orlando Magic games aired exclusively on Bally Sports Florida in Central and Northern Florida. The two channels do not focus on one region of Florida, but simply distribute games in accordance with each team's territorial rights, with both cable channels maintaining exclusivity over regional broadcasts of Heat, Marlins (before 2026), Rays (before 2026) and Magic games.

The Miami Heat are televised on FanDuel Sports Network Sun, while the Orlando Magic are televised on FanDuel Sports Network Florida. Additionally, each network televises exclusive shoulder programming highlighting the team, players and coaches on the corresponding network.

On February 3rd, 2026, the Miami Marlins and MLB Local Media announced the launch of Marlins.TV, replacing FanDuel Sports Network Florida for the broadcast rights of the Marlins.

== Notable on-air staff ==
=== Current ===
- David Steele - Orlando Magic play-by-play announcer
- Jeff Turner - Orlando Magic color analyst
- Dante Marchitelli - Orlando Magic play-by-play announcer, studio host and reporter
- Kendra Douglas - Orlando Magic studio host and reporter
- Brian Hill - Orlando Magic studio analyst
- Nick Anderson - Orlando Magic studio analyst
- Bo Outlaw - Orlando Magic studio analyst
- Quentin Richardson - Orlando Magic studio analyst
- Terrence Ross - Orlando Magic studio analyst

=== Former ===
- Alex Chappell - Tampa Bay Rays pre and post-game reporter now with ESPN and Mid-Atlantic Sports Network
- Laura Rutledge - Tampa Bay Rays pre and post-game reporter now with ESPN/SEC Network
- Allison Williams - Miami Marlins in-game reporter, Formerly of ESPN and now with Fox Sports
- Joe Magrane - Tampa Bay Rays analyst now with MLB Network
- Kevin Kennedy - Tampa Bay Rays analyst
- Kelly Nash - Tampa Bay Rays pre and post-game reporter now with MLB Network and NHL Network
- Rich Waltz - Miami Marlins Announcer formerly with MLB Network, MLB on TBS, and Los Angeles Angels baseball play-by-play announcer now with College Football and Basketball play-by-play on CBS Sports, and CBS Sports Network
- Todd Hollandsworth - Miami Marlins color analyst
- J. P. Arencibia - Miami Marlins studio analyst
- Steve Goldstein - Florida Panthers play-by-play announcer
- Randy Moller - Florida Panthers color analyst
- Ed Jovanovski - Florida Panthers studio analyst
- Jeff Chychrun - Florida Panthers studio analyst
- Paul Severino - Miami Marlins play-by-play announcer
- Craig Minervini - Miami Marlins and Florida Panthers studio host and reporter
- Jessica Blaylock - Florida Panthers studio host and reporter
- Kyle Sielaff - Miami Marlins play-by-play announcer
- Jeff Nelson - Miami Marlins studio analyst and color analyst
- Gaby Sánchez - Miami Marlins studio analyst and color analyst
- Rod Allen - Miami Marlins color analyst
- Tommy Hutton - Miami Marlins studio analyst and color analyst

== Carriage conflicts ==
=== Bright House ===
For its first 21 years of existence, the channel was not available to most cable subscribers in the Orlando area, as Bright House Networks, the largest cable system in central Florida, refused to carry the channel. The conflict stemmed from the system's previous existence as Cablevision (a brand unaffiliated with the Bethpage, New York-based cable provider of the same name), and continued through its acquisition by Time Warner Cable and, later, Bright House. This issue did not change following Fox Sports' acquisition of Sun Sports, now known as Bally Sports Sun, which Bright House already carried on its Orlando area lineup, and continued even after the Orlando Magic moved half of the televised games in its schedule from MyNetworkTV owned-and-operated station WRBW (channel 65) to Fox Sports Florida in 2007.

Fox Sports Net's sister subsidiary Fox Television Stations had earlier purchased WRBW (then a UPN affiliate) in Orlando in 2001, followed by its purchase of Fox affiliate WOFL (channel 35) in 2002. On paper, this gave News Corporation – the corporate parent of the Fox Sports Networks at the time – the right to require Bright House to carry Fox Sports Florida as part of its retransmission consent compensation agreement for carriage of WOFL and WRBW, but Fox chose not to exercise that right. Bright House would agree to carry Fox Sports Florida on its Orlando system, with the channel being added on digital cable channel 50 on January 1, 2009. News Corporation and Bright House reached a new retransmission agreement on January 1, 2010, preventing both Fox Sports Florida and Sun Sports from being dropped from the provider's central Florida system. Fox would want Bright House to return Fox Sports Florida and Sun Sports to the provider's Orlando service area on February 12, 2010.

Fox Sports Florida was also not available on Comcast systems in the Sarasota and Tallahassee markets until 2006, and remains unavailable on Comcast's Lake County systems. Orlando Magic games aired on the channel are blacked out by Comcast in the Jacksonville market.
