= FanDuel Sports Network Sun =

American regional sports network

- Type: Regional sports network
- Country: United States
- Broadcast area: Florida; Nationwide (via satellite)
- Network: FanDuel Sports Network
- Headquarters: Fort Lauderdale, Florida

Programming
- Language: English
- Picture format: 720p (HDTV); 480i (SDTV)

Ownership
- Owner: Main Street Sports Group
- Sister channels: FanDuel Sports Network Florida

History
- Launched: March 4, 1988 (38 years ago)
- Closed: September 30, 2026 (37 days ago)
- Former names: Sunshine Network (1988–2005); Sun Sports (2005–2015); Fox Sports Sun (2015–2021); Bally Sports Sun (2021–2024)

Links
- Website: www.fanduelsportsnetwork.com

FanDuel Sports Network Sun was an American regional sports network owned by Main Street Sports Group (formerly Diamond Sports Group) and operates as an affiliate of FanDuel Sports Network. The channel broadcast local coverage of professional, collegiate and sporting events in the state of Florida, with a focus on professional sports teams based in Miami, Tampa and Orlando. FanDuel Sports Network Sun and sister regional sports network FanDuel Sports Network Florida were headquartered in Fort Lauderdale, Florida with studios located in Tampa.

FanDuel Sports Network was available on cable providers throughout Florida; it is also available nationwide on satellite via DirecTV.

== History ==
Original logo as Sunshine Network, used from 1988 to 2002.

The channel launched on March 4, 1988, as Sunshine Network, originally serving as an affiliate of Prime Network. The network was formed as a joint-venture of 11 cable companies and Home Sports Entertainment. Later that year, Sunshine would obtain rights to broadcast the Orlando Magic in their inaugural season. In 1992, the network would also secure rights to another new team, the Tampa Bay Lightning. In its early years, the network also aired some public affairs programming in addition to sports.

Because Florida did not have a Major League Baseball team at the time, the network featured games from multiple teams including Rangers, Astros, Tigers, Orioles, and Twins, along with college sports from UCF, Florida State, Stetson and Jacksonville Universities. In 1993, Sunshine gained rights to the Florida Marlins expansion team. In 1997, half of the 70 game schedule was moved to rival SportsChannel Florida (which at the time was owned by Marlins' owner Wayne Huizenga). The following season, the entire schedule was moved to SportsChannel.

In 1996, News Corporation, which formed a sports division for the Fox Broadcasting Company in 1994 with the acquisition of the television rights to the National Football Conference of the National Football League, entered into a joint venture with TCI spinoff Liberty Media and rebranded that company's Prime Network affiliates under the "Fox Sports Net" banner. Sunshine Network was the only Fox Sports Net owned-and-operated charter outlet that did not rebrand under that name when it and the other Prime outlets relaunched as Fox Sports Net on November 1, 1996. Liberty Media (which at this point owned 49% of the network) proposed Fox Sports Sunshine as a new name for the network, but ultimately the rest of the owners did not approve it. In early 2000, Fox Sports Net programming moved from Sunshine to the newly rebranded Fox Sports Net Florida.

Sun Sports logo, used from 2004 to 2012.

Fox Sports Sun logo, used from 2015 to 2021.

Sunshine Network changed its name to Sun Sports on January 18, 2005, in order to reflect its sports-focused programming. Sun Sports and Fox Sports Florida were spun off with the rest of the Fox Sports Networks and most of News Corporation's other U.S. entertainment properties into 21st Century Fox in July 2013. On October 4, 2015, Sun Sports changed its name to Fox Sports Sun (FSSUN).

Former logo as Bally Sports Sun, used from 2021 to 2024.

On December 14, 2017, as part of a merger between both companies, The Walt Disney Company announced plans to acquire all 22 regional Fox Sports Networks from 21st Century Fox, including Fox Sports Sun and sister network Fox Sports Florida. However, on June 27, 2018, the Justice Department ordered their divestment under antitrust grounds, citing Disney's ownership of ESPN. On May 3, 2019, Sinclair Broadcast Group and Entertainment Studios (through their joint venture, Diamond Holdings) bought Fox Sports Networks from The Walt Disney Company for $10.6 billion. The deal closed on August 22, 2019. On November 17, 2020, Sinclair announced an agreement with casino operator Bally's Corporation to serve as a new naming rights partner for the FSN channels. Sinclair announced the new Bally Sports branding for the channels on January 27, 2021. On March 31, 2021, coinciding with the 2021 Major League Baseball season, Fox Sports Sun and sister network Fox Sports Florida were rebranded as Bally Sports Sun and Bally Sports Florida, resulting in 18 other Regional Sports Networks renamed Bally Sports in their respective regions. The first live sports event on Bally Sports Sun was at 7 PM featuring the Miami Heat at the Indiana Pacers. The game was preceded with the "Heat Live" pregame show.

On March 14, 2023, Diamond Sports filed for Chapter 11 Bankruptcy.

On May 1, 2024, the Bally Sports channels, including Bally Sports Sun, were removed from Comcast's Xfinity television service due to a carriage dispute with Diamond Sports Group. The dispute was resolved and the channels were restored on August 1 of that year, albeit on the more expensive "Ultimate TV" service tier rather than the basic tier.

On October 16, 2024, it was revealed in a court filing that Diamond had reached a new sponsorship agreement with FanDuel Group, under which it intended to rebrand Bally Sports as the FanDuel Sports Network; on October 18, 2024, Diamond officially announced the rebranding, which took effect October 21. Under the agreement, FanDuel has the option to take a minority equity stake of up to 5% once Diamond Sports exits bankruptcy. The branding is downplayed during programming related to high school sports.

On May 14, 2025, the Tampa Bay Lightning announced that they would leave FanDuel Sports Network Sun, with the E. W. Scripps Company-owned WXPX-TV taking over local broadcasts through Scripps Sports.

== Programming ==
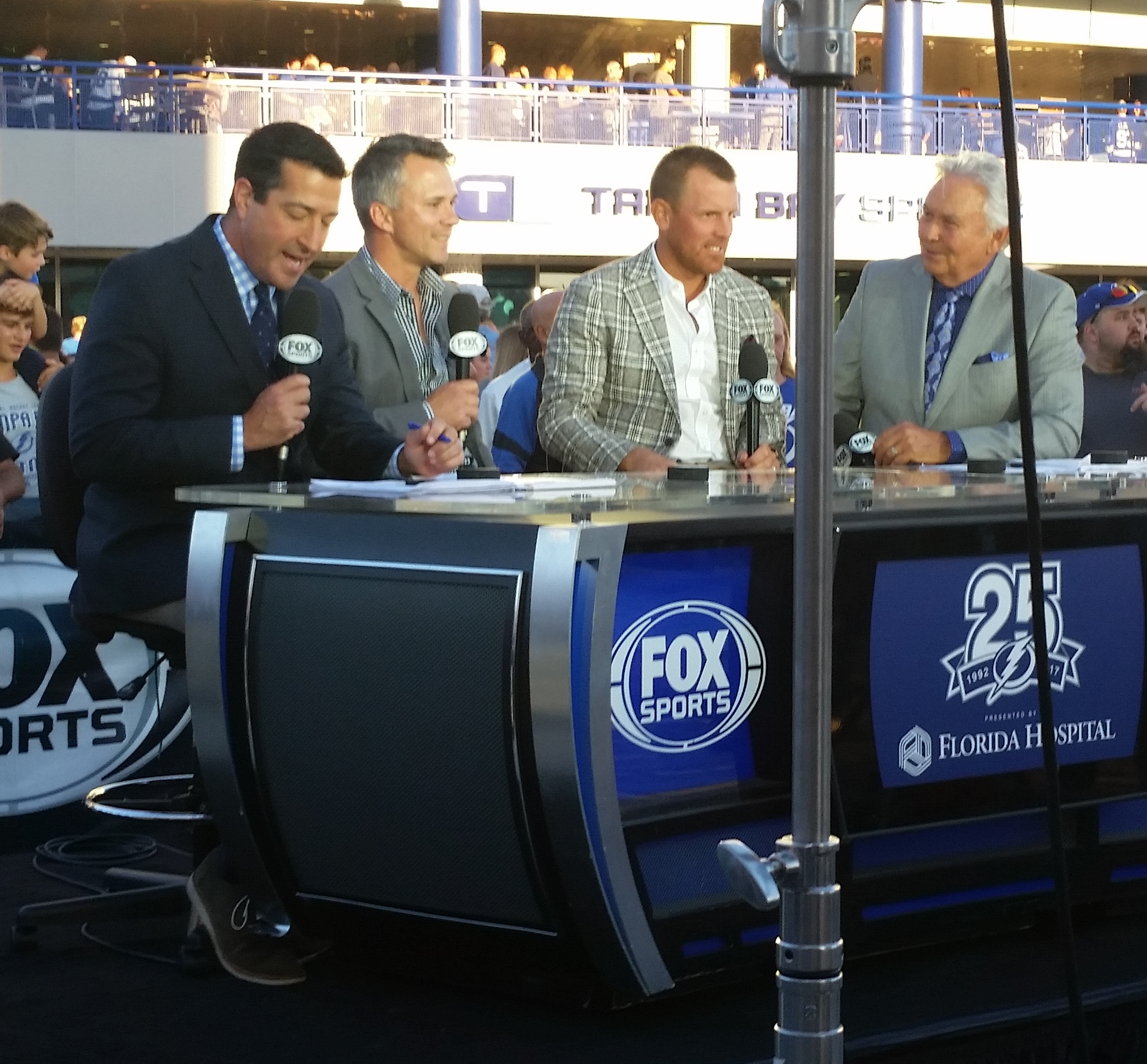
Covering the Tampa Bay Lightning

FanDuel Sports Network Sun previously held the regional cable television rights to the NBA's Miami Heat, the NHL's Tampa Bay Lightning, and the MLB's Tampa Bay Rays. In addition, FanDuel Sports Network Sun offers insider programming for the Florida Gators and Florida State Seminoles.

FanDuel Sports Network Sun maintains separate feeds for individual regions of the state, with feeds for Miami (covering South Florida), Tampa (covering western Florida) and Orlando (covering northern and central Florida). The separation of broadcast zones for the channel is mostly due to the defined broadcast territories set by the National Basketball Association for the Orlando Magic and Miami Heat. Programming seen in each broadcasting zone is common in most areas, and includes a mix of programs supplied by FanDuel Sports Network and some original programming exclusive to FanDuel Sports Network Sun and FanDuel Sports Network Florida. Due to the naming rights deal with FanDuel, select programming from FanDuel TV is included in the schedule.

FanDuel Sports Network Sun is also home to outdoor programming, highlighted by extensive salt and fresh water fishing programs such as the Chevy Florida Insider Fishing Report and Sportsman's Adventures.

=== Former programming ===
From 2003 to 2004, the network aired Major League Wrestling's (MLW) taped weekly professional wrestling show MLW Underground TV which featured taped matches from MLW's past events.

On May 14, 2025, it was reported that Main Street Sports Group had opted out of its contract with the Tampa Bay Lightning. The team then signed with Scripps Sports and WXPX.

On January 9th, 2026, the Tampa Bay Rays terminated their rights deal with FanDuel Sports Network, following Main Street Sports Group's financial troubles. One month later, the MLB announced that it ill take over production of Rays telecasts, along with the launch of Rays.TV for the 2026 MLB season.

On June 8th, 2026, WPLG and the Miami Heat announced an expanded rights agreement to make WPLG Local 10 the official home to local telecasts of Heat games, starting in the 2026-27 NBA season.

=== Programming rights with FanDuel Sports Network Florida ===
FanDuel Sports Network Sun shares the broadcast rights to the aforementioned professional sports teams with FanDuel Sports Network Florida. As the two regional networks are commonly owned, events from any team/conference in which FDSN Sun and FDSN Florida broadcasts are able to air on either channel depending on the start time of each team's respective games (particularly with the Marlins and Rays, since both teams routinely play at concurring start times).

The two channels do not focus on one region of Florida (although it was long rumored since the two came under common ownership that FDSN Sun would carry only teams from the Orlando and Tampa Bay areas, while FDSN Florida would carry Miami-area teams), but simply distribute games in accordance with each team's territorial rights, with both cable channels maintaining joint exclusivity over regional broadcasts of Heat, Marlins, Rays and the Magic.

In 2010, the Miami Marlins moved all of their Major League Baseball games to then Fox Sports Florida, while the Tampa Bay Rays began carrying all their games on then Sun Sports. Prior to 2009, some Rays games were available on broadcast television stations in the state via a network made up of the state's Ion Television stations.

== Current personalities ==
=== Miami Heat ===
- Eric Reid – play-by-play announcer
- John Crotty – analyst
- Jason Jackson – post-game host and in-game reporter
- Ron Rothstein – half-time and post-game analyst

=== Orlando Magic ===
- David Steele – play-by-play announcer
- Jeff Turner – analyst
- Paul Kennedy – host and in-game reporter
- Dante Marchitelli – fill in in-game reporter

== Former personalities ==
=== Tampa Bay Rays ===
- Dewayne Staats – play-by-play announcer
- Andy Freed – fill-in play-by-play announcer
- Brian Anderson – color commentator
- Matt Joyce – pre-game and post-game color analyst
- Denard Span – pre-game and post-game color analyst
- Doug Waechter – pre-game and post-game color analyst
- Rich Hollenberg - Pre and Post game host and fill-in play-by-play announcer
- Ryan Bass - field reporter

=== Miami Marlins ===
- Kyle Sielaff – play-by-play announcer
- Tommy Hutton - analyst
- Jeff Nelson – analyst (select games)
- Gaby Sánchez – analyst (select games)
- Rod Allen – analyst (select games)
- Craig Minervini – pre-game host and in-game reporter and Fill-in play-by-play announcer
- Kelly Saco – pre-game host and Fill-in in-game reporter
