= WGSM =

WGSM may refer to:

- WHJB, a radio station (107.1 FM) licensed to Greensburg, Pennsylvania, United States, which used the call sign WGSM from 2006 to 2009
- WNYH, a radio station (740 AM) licensed to Huntington, New York, United States, which used the call sign WGSM from when it signed on in 1951 until September 2005
- WWSK, a radio station (94.3 FM) licensed to Smithtown, New York, United States, which used the call sign WGSM-FM from 1965 to 1970
