= WGBB =

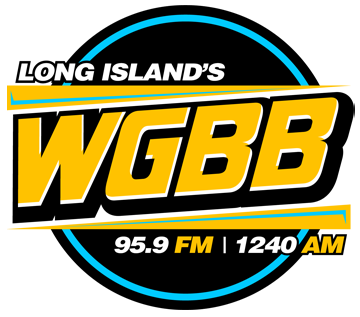
- Freeport, New York; United States
- Broadcast area: Nassau County
- Frequency: 1240 kHz

Programming
- Languages: Chinese, English, and Spanish
- Format: Brokered programming

Ownership
- Owner: WGBB AM, Inc.

History
- First air date: 1924
- Former call signs: WGBB (1924–1988); WBAB (1988–1991)
- Former frequencies: 1240 kHz (1924–1925); 1230 kHz (1925–1927); 1220 kHz (1927); 1210 kHz (1928–1941)
- Call sign meaning: Randomly assigned, used for slogan of "Where Good Broadcasting Begins"

Technical information
- Licensing authority: FCC
- Facility ID: 72091
- Class: C
- Power: 1,000 watts
- Transmitter coordinates: 40°38′44.4″N 73°34′37.5″W
- Translator: 95.9 W240DF (Freeport)

Links
- Public license information: Public file; LMS
- Webcast: Listen live
- Website: wgbbradio.com

WGBB (1240 AM) is a radio station licensed to Freeport, New York and serving Nassau County, New York. Founded in 1924, it is Long Island's oldest radio station.

WGBB broadcasts the Chinese–language "Chinese Radio Network" and various English and Spanish language religious and ethnic brokered programming. The studio is located in Merrick, New York and its transmitter site is located in Freeport, former location of the studio.

== History ==
=== The Carman years (1924–1954) ===
WGBB was first licensed on December 13, 1924, to Harry H. Carman, for operation on 1240 kHz. The call letters were randomly assigned by the Commerce Department from a sequential roster of available call signs, and were later backronymed to form the slogan "Where Good Broadcasting Begins". Carman was also the operator of amateur station 2EL, and remained owner of WGBB until his death in 1954.

After the 1927 formation of the Federal Radio Commission (FRC), share-time assignments became common, because there were more stations than available frequencies, especially in the congested New York City region. WGBB's assignments included 1220 kHz (400 watts), sharing with WAAT, Jersey City, New Jersey and WSOM, New York City and, by November 1928, 1210 kHz (100 watts), now sharing with several suburban stations including WBRB, Red Bank, New Jersey; WFAS, White Plains, New York; and WGNY, Newburgh, New York.

WGNY dropped out in 1939 by moving to 1220 kHz. As part of the March 29, 1941, implementation of the FRC's General Order 40, most stations on 1210 kHz, including WGBB, were shifted to 1240 kHz. By 1942 the frequency sharing was reduced when WBRB went out of business. On March 22, 1943, WFAS relocated to 1230 kHz, ending WGBB's share-time operation and allowing unlimited use of 1240 kHz.

In 1931, the studios for "The Voice of the Sunrise Trail" were moved from Carman's Bedell Street home in Freeport, to the Freeport Post Office building at 64 South Grove Street; the post office was in the process of relocating to its current building on Merrick Road. WGBB's transmitter remained at 217 Bedell Street; situated in Carman's garage. In 1937, the studios were relocated to 44 South Grove Street. In 1947 WGBB's long-wire antenna, strung between utility poles in Carman's backyard, was replaced by a gleaming self-supporting 285-foot (87m) vertical antenna. Carman's original tower was replaced with the current structure in the early 1980s.

=== Post-Carman ===
Harry Carman was seriously injured in an auto accident just before Christmas 1953 and perished the following July. After Carman's death, WGBB was sold for $95,000 to a group of Long Island businessmen, who organized "Long Island's First Station, Inc." John Whitmore was named station manager, who rapidly restructured programming into an up-to-date presentation playing current music. Despite the makeover WGBB faced financial difficulties and went into receivership.

On August 6, 1956, Edward J. Fitzgerald, owner of WGSM in Huntington, New York took control after a sale approved by the Federal Communications Commission (FCC), and a bankruptcy court judge; the price was assumption of WGBB's debt. The FCC waived its duopoly rule which prohibited ownership of overlapping signals saying this was a way to be sure creditors would be paid. Fitzgerald guided the station's music policy back to standards away from current hits and especially doo-wop which was being played on the popular Night Train evening music show hosted by Lee Donahue and later Alan Fredericks.

Under Fitzgerald's direction WGBB began to attract big-league national sponsors because sale of commercial announcements on WGBB/WGSM were made in combination, accounting for a revenue surge. Fitzgerald connected his stations with broadcast telephone lines establishing "The Long Island Network," which offered hourly news, sports, a fishing report, weekend public affairs programs, even a few music shows. The news originated at WGBB which had ample space for a newsroom.

On May 12, 1965, WGBB was sold for $452,000 to Susquehanna, a group broadcaster based in York, Pennsylvania. Susquehanna built new studios in a building just a few steps from the Merrick Long Island Railroad station. WGBB morphed into a pop music outlet with a strong local news presence.

On July 22, 1981, Susquehanna sold WGBB to a group headed by Franz Allina for close to $1 million. The new operators had taken control by mid-September.

On November 19, 1986, Noble Broadcast Group acquired WGBB joining it with WBAB-FM a Babylon, New York-based AOR outlet. WGBB would soon move to the new WBAB studios on Sunrise Highway in West Babylon. On January 22, 1988, the sixty-four-year-old WGBB call letters were retired and 1240 took the identity of its FM sister station becoming WBAB and began simulcasting WBAB-FM most of the time. Also in 1988 night-time power was increased to 1,000 watts from 250 watts. When the simulcast with WBAB-FM ended, the station implemented a news-talk format and on April 15, 1991, returned to the original WGBB call letters.

WGBB and WBAB were purchased by Liberty Broadcasting on February 15, 1993, for $16 million. The deal did not separate WGBB's value. Liberty later added WBLI in Patchogue, New York and WHFM in Southampton, New York to its Long Island station cluster. WBLI would keep its Top 40 format, while WHFM became a simulcast of WBAB.

On July 1, 1996 Robert F. X. Sillerman's SFX Broadcasting Inc. announced it had acquired Liberty Broadcasting. As part of the deal SFX and Chancellor Broadcasting (owners of WALK and WALK-FM in Patchogue, New York) also agreed to exchange SFX's four Long Island stations in New York, gained in the Liberty acquisition, for two of Chancellor's Jacksonville, Fla., stations and $11 million. On October 7, 1996, WGBB and WBAB-FM began an LMA with Chancellor Broadcasting, a simulcast with WALK 1370 was begun under the name "Sunrise Radio Network". On September 4, 1997, Chancellor changed its name to Chancellor Media Corp. The deal with Chancellor Media to purchase WGBB and WBAB-FM fell through in early 1998 after the Justice Department filed an antitrust suit to block Chancellor's purchase, and the simulcast ended. At that time WGBB began running the audio portion of CNN Headline News during the times no local talk shows were scheduled.

On May 22, 1998 Cox Broadcasting, a large national chain, purchased WGBB, WBAB-FM, WBLI and WHFM. Cox's main interest was in the FM stations and a few months later, in October 1998, dealt WGBB to a splinter group of Multicultural Broadcasting for $1.7 million. Under the new ownership, WGBB began broadcasting in Chinese by simulcasting the Chinese Radio Network in time slots not brokered to outside producers. After the sale of WGBB to Multicultural, WGBB moved to a new studio at 1850 Lansdowne Avenue across Sunrise Highway from the Merrick Long Island Rail Road station; meanwhile, WBLI moved from their studios in Medford, New York into the studios that WGBB had just vacated.

A few years later, another move took place, this time to the WNYG (another Multicultural outlet) facilities at 404 Route 109 near Sunrise Highway in Babylon, New York. WNYG was sold a few years later and relocated to Medford, which left WGBB alone in the old WNYG facility.
