= WLIR (disambiguation) =

WLIR may refer to:

- WLIR-FM, a radio station (107.1 FM) licensed to Hampton Bays, New York, United States

Former radio stations:

- WFME-FM, a radio station (92.7 FM) licensed to Garden City, New York, which used the WLIR call sign from 1959 to 1987, and again from 1996 to 2004
- WLIR, the radio station that played new music/modern rock originally heard on the frequencies 92.7 FM, 98.5 FM, and 107.1 FM from the 1980s into the 2000s
- WRCR, a radio station (1700 AM) licensed to Haverstraw, New York, which used the WLIR call sign from 1987 to 2000
- WBZO, a radio station (98.5 FM) licensed to Westhampton, New York, which used the WLIR call sign in 1996
