= WRIV =

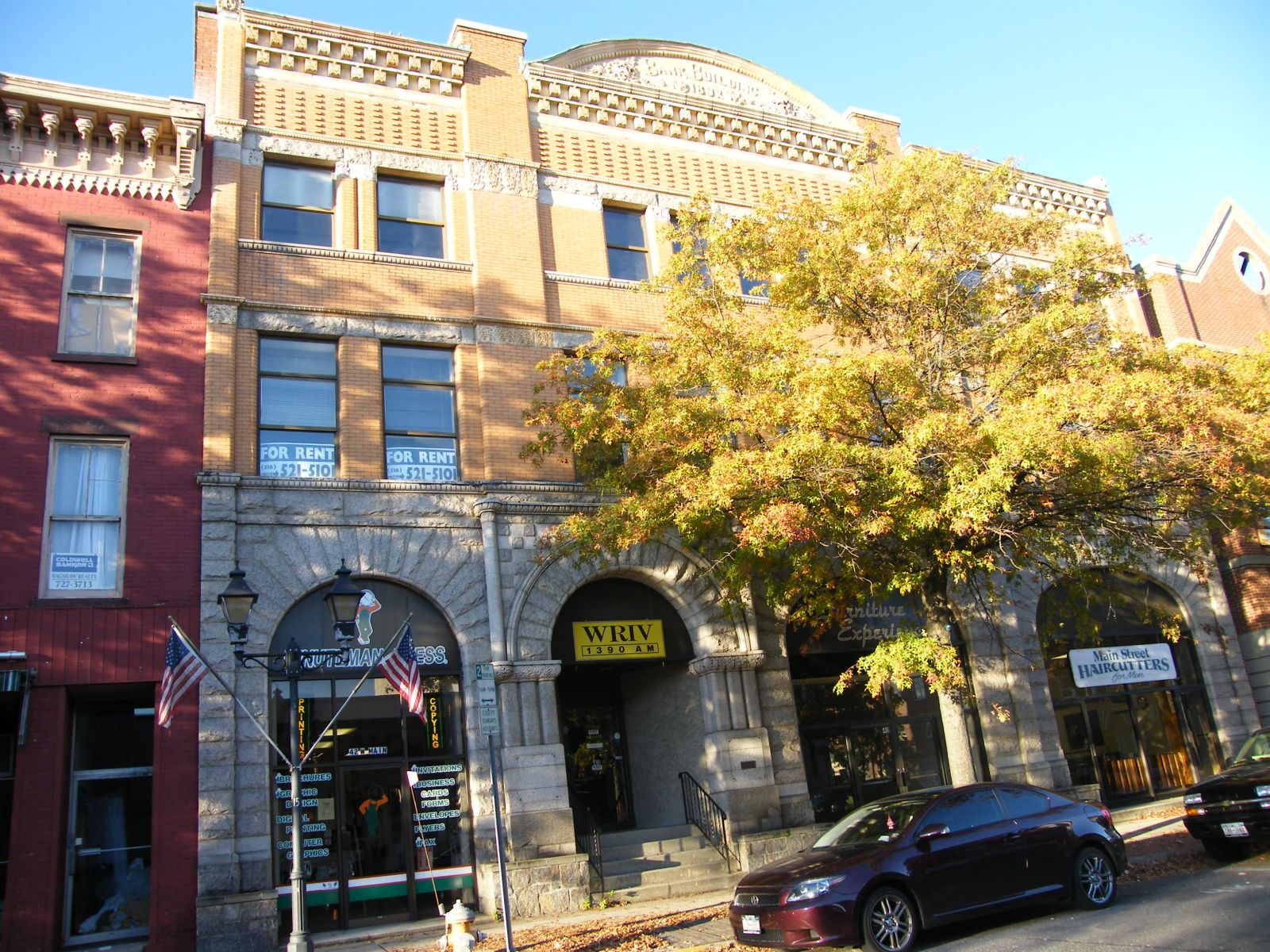
- WRIV studios in downtown Riverhead
- Riverhead, New York; United States
- Broadcast area: Eastern Long Island
- Frequency: 1390 kHz
- Branding: 1390 WRIV

Programming
- Format: Adult standards
- Affiliations: ABC News Radio

Ownership
- Owner: Crystal Coast Communications

History
- First air date: June 19, 1955
- Call sign meaning: Riverhead

Technical information
- Licensing authority: FCC
- Facility ID: 14647
- Class: D
- Power: 1,000 watts (daytime); 64 watts (night)
- Transmitter coordinates: 40°54′55″N 72°39′28″W

Links
- Public license information: Public file; LMS
- Webcast: Listen live
- Website: www.1390wriv.com

WRIV (1390 AM) is a radio station licensed to Riverhead, New York. Established in 1955, the station broadcasts an adult standards format to Eastern Long Island.

The station, which has been owned since 1987 by Crystal Coast Communications, has daytime power of 1,000 watts and 64 watts at night.

== History ==
The station, then owned by the Suffolk Broadcasting Corporation, went on the air on June 19, 1955, as a sister station to co-owned WALK and WALK-FM radio in Patchogue, New York. Its first studio at 29 East Main Street burned within six months in what is listed by the Riverhead Fire Department as one of the worst fires in the town's history.

In 1963, WRIV, along with WALK and WALK-FM, was sold to Island Broadcasting System. Island Broadcasting was owned in part by NBC News anchorman Chet Huntley. In 1965, WRIV applied for a television license for Channel 55. WRIV-TV held a construction permit for the station until the early 1970s. The Channel 55 allocation was dormant until WLIG-TV went on the air in 1985; today Channel 55 is known as WLNY-TV and is owned by CBS.

WRIV was sold again in 1981 to East End Communications and became sister station to now defunct WGLI 1290 in Babylon, New York before being sold to its current owners.

Some former personalities on the station include: Ted Brown (following the demise of WNEW) and former WALK morning personality Bob Klein.

WRIV is the only commercial AM radio station in the five east-end towns of Long Island. It maintains an adult standards full-service radio format and has local personalities. The station is an affiliate of the ABC Information Network.
