= Geography of Long Island =

Long Island is in southeastern New York, United States, separated from the rest of the state by the East River and from Connecticut by Long Island Sound. Long Island contains four counties, of which the western two are boroughs (Queens and Brooklyn) of New York City, and the other two (Nassau and Suffolk) are mainly suburban.

== Geology ==
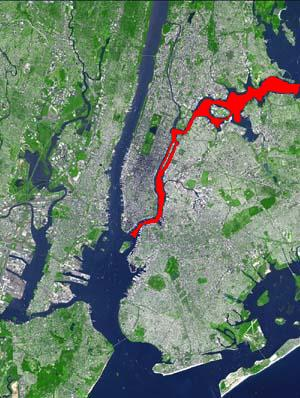
The East River, highlighted in red here, separates Long Island from Manhattan Island and from the mainland.

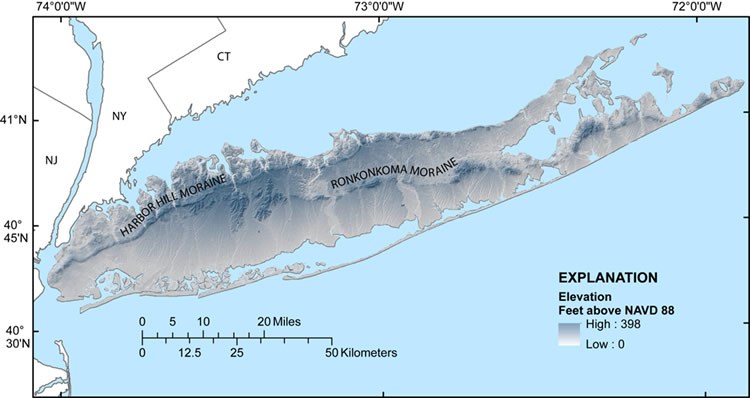
The Harbor Hill and Ronkonkoma moraines

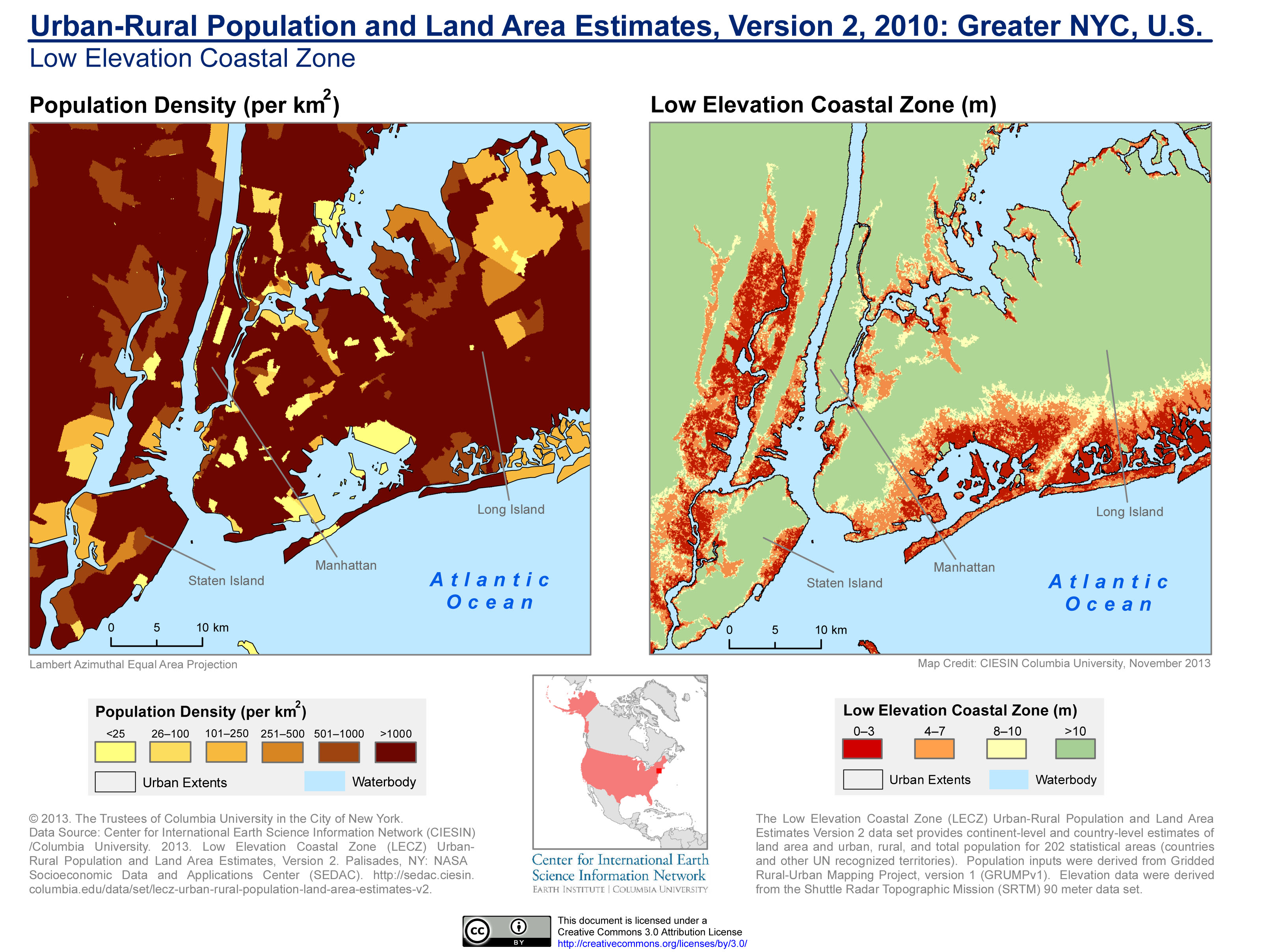
Population density and elevation above sea level in Greater NYC, U.S. (2010). Long Island is especially vulnerable to sea level rise.

Long Island, as part of the Outer Lands region, is formed largely of four spines of glacial moraine, with a large, sandy outwash plain towards its barrier islands and the Atlantic Ocean. These moraines consist of gravel and loose rock left behind during the two most recent pulses of Wisconsin glaciation some 21,000 years ago (19,000 BC). The northern moraine, which directly abuts the North Shore of Long Island at points, is known as the Harbor Hill moraine. The more southerly moraine, known as the Ronkonkoma moraine, forms the "backbone" of Long Island; it runs primarily through the very center of Long Island, roughly coinciding with the length of the Long Island Expressway.

The land to the south of this moraine to the South Shore is the outwash plain of the last glacier. Part of this, known as the Hempstead Plains, supported one of the few natural prairies to exist east of the Appalachian Mountains.

The glaciers melted and receded to the north, resulting in the difference between the North Shore beaches and the South Shore beaches. The North Shore beaches are rocky from the remaining glacial debris, while the South Shore's are crisp, clear, outwash sand. Running along the center of the island like a spine is the moraine left by the glaciers. The glaciers also formed Lake Ronkonkoma, a kettle lake.

The island's tallest natural point is Jayne's Hill near Melville, with an elevation of 400.9 feet (122.2 m) above sea level. Long Island is separated from the mainland by the East River, not in fact a river, but a tidal strait. Long Island Sound forms the northern boundary of the island.

Long Island contains a series of sand and gravel aquifers, geologic formations which can hold, transmit, and yield water in usable quantities. All of Long Island's water supply comes from underground water reserves held in aquifers. Stacked one on top of the other like layers in a cake, three major and one minor aquifer make up the Long Island aquifer system. In sequence from shallowest to the deepest, the Long Island aquifers are: the Upper Glacial, the Magothy and the Lloyd Aquifers. All Long Island aquifers receive their fresh water from precipitation which takes from 25 to 1,000 years to migrate through the layers to the aquifers, which hold roughly 70 trillion US gallons (260 km^{3})—enough to flood the entire surface of Long Island with more than 300 feet (90 m) of water—and can withstand long droughts that could dry up surface-water reservoirs like the ones that supply New York City. Almost four million gallons each day are taken from beneath Nassau and Suffolk Counties, providing the primary source of water for the resident population. While most homes are on a municipal water system, there are still many areas where homes have their own wells to provide water. Both Nassau and Suffolk counties have long recognized their dependence on the aquifers and have stipulated that recharge basins (known locally as sumps) be built to collect ground water. Recharge basins are required and sized based upon the scale of any new development on Long Island.

In United States v. Maine (1985), the U.S. Supreme Court treated the island as a peninsula for the purposes of a boundary decision. Despite the legal decision, the United States Board on Geographic Names considers Long Island an island, because it is surrounded by water.

== Climate ==
Long Island has a climate similar to other coastal areas in the Northeast; it has hot and humid summers and cool to cold winters. The Atlantic Ocean helps bring afternoon sea breezes to the immediate south shore that temper the heat in the warmer months. Severe thunderstorms are common, nevertheless, especially when they approach the island from the mainland areas of the Bronx, Westchester County and Connecticut in the northwest. The humid subtropical climate zone (Cfa) according to the Köppen climate classification has expanded to include the majority of the area of Long Island (including Brooklyn, Queens, most of Nassau, and parts of Suffolk) due to global warming, This area according to the Trewartha climate classification is oceanic (Do.) Trewartha requires at least eight months to be at least 50°F to be considered subtropical and Long Island has six to seven such months. The remainder of the island has January average below freezing and a hot-summer humid continental climate (Dfa.) The hardiness zone is 7b except in portions of Suffolk where it is 7a.

=== Temperatures ===
Long Island temperatures vary from west to east, with the western part (Nassau County) of the island slightly warmer on occasions than the east (Suffolk County). This is due to two factors: the western part is closer to the mainland, and it is more densely developed, causing the "urban heat island" effect. The eastern part is cooler on most occasions due to moderation of the Atlantic Ocean and Long Island Sound, and its being less developed.

On dry nights with no clouds or wind, the Pine Barrens in eastern Suffolk County can be almost 10 degrees Fahrenheit (6 degrees Celsius) cooler due to Radiational cooling.

Monthly Normal High and Low Temperatures for Various New York Locations
City	Jan	Feb	Mar	Apr	May	Jun	Jul	Aug	Sep	Oct	Nov	Dec
Islip, LI	39/23	40/24	48/31	58/40	69/49	77/60	83/66	82/64	75/57	64/45	54/36	44/28
New York City	38/26	41/28	50/35	61/44	71/54	79/63	84/69	82/68	75/60	64/50	53/41	43/32
Temperatures listed using the Fahrenheit scale

=== Winter ===
Long Island sees the majority of its snowfall between the months of December and March, though it is not uncommon to see light snowfalls during mid-late November and early April. In many winters one or more intense storms (called a Nor'easter) produce blizzard conditions with snowfalls of 1–2 feet (30–60 cm) and near-hurricane force winds.

An animated map of a Nor'easter's movement.

Average yearly snowfall totals range from approximately 25 to 40 inches (64–102 cm), with the north shore and western parts averaging more than the immediate south shore and the east end. In any given winter, however, some parts of the island could see up to 75 inches (190 cm) or more. There are also some very quiet winters, in which most parts of the island could see less than 15 inches (38 cm) when cold blasts happen.

=== Severe weather ===
Long Island is somewhat vulnerable to hurricanes. Its northern location and relatively cool waters tend to weaken storms to below hurricane strength by the time they reach Long Island, although despite this, some storms have made landfall at Category 1 or greater strength, including two unnamed Category 3 storms in 1938 (New England Hurricane of 1938) and 1944, Hurricane Donna in 1960, Hurricane Belle in 1976, Hurricane Gloria in 1985, Hurricane Bob in 1991 (brushed the eastern tip) and Hurricane Floyd in 1999. (There is debate among climatologists as to whether Hurricane Floyd made landfall as a Category 1 or as a very strong "almost hurricane strength" tropical storm. The official records note it as the latter.)

Many other storms crossed the island directly at tropical storm strength, including Hurricane Bertha in 1996 and Hurricane Charley in 2004. In September 2006, the remnants of Hurricane Ernesto swept through the area, causing several temporary power outages on parts of the island. In October 2012, Hurricane Sandy crossed the island making landfall over New Jersey as a post-tropical cyclone with hurricane-force winds. On Long Island, damage from the storm included severe flooding along the south shore and downed trees and utility poles on the north shore.

Some thunderstorms can be extremely severe with tornadoes, although somewhat rare, but possible. In September 1998, a tornado hit Lynbrook; in August 1999, an F-2 tornado hit parts of Mattituck, in August 2005, a tornado hit Glen Cove; one year later in August 2006, a small tornado hit Massapequa in Nassau County, and parts of Amityville, located in Suffolk County. On July 18, 2007, an F-1 tornado hit Islip Terrace and on September 27, 2006, a waterspout was seen over Long Island Sound near Port Jefferson. On November 13, 2021, six tornadoes touched down on Long Island over the course of only an hour and a half as a strong cold front moved through. One tornado was determined to be of EF-1 strength in Shirley and Manorville, while the other five were determined to be EF-0 tornadoes. In the wintertime, temperatures are sometimes warmer than areas further inland in Nassau County but Suffolk County will usually get at least one day where the temperature is below 0 °F (-18 °C) for low temperatures (especially in the night and early morning hours), In late July 2008 off the coast of Quogue on Dune Road, a water spout formed in the ocean; the related severe thunderstorms were the worst reported in years.

== See also ==
- Geography of New York
- Geography of New York City
- Shelter Rock (North Hills, New York)
