= Telescope Hill =

Hill in New York, United States

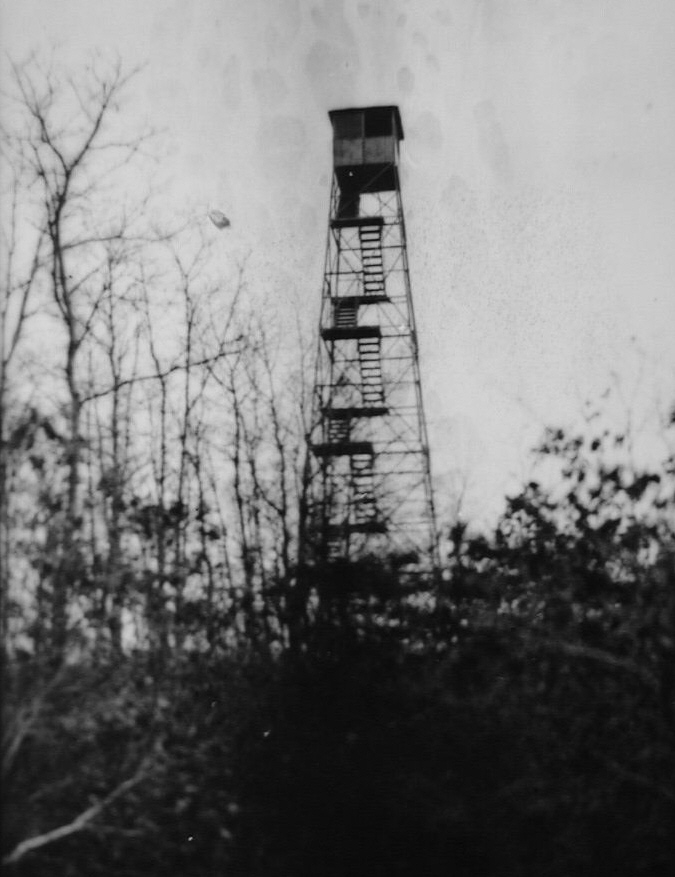
- Telescope Hill Fire Tower

Highest point
- Elevation: 334 ft (102 m)
- Coordinates: 40°50′41″N 73°01′58″W

Geography
- Location within New York
- Location: Town of Brookhaven, New York, US, on border of Farmingville and Selden ZIP Codes.
- Parent range: Ronkonkoma Moraine
- Topo map: USGS Brookhaven

Climbing
- Easiest route: Road

Telescope Hill, at 334 feet (102 m), is the highest point of elevation in the Town of Brookhaven, on Long Island, New York, United States. The hill is located at the end of Tower Hill Ave., on the border of the ZIP codes of the hamlets of Selden and Farmingville, and west of Bald Hill.

Notably, Telescope Hill was the site of a fire observation station operated by the New York State Conservation Commission and later the Conservation Department from 1918 to 1959.

== Geology ==
As with the Bald Hill area, Telescope Hill is part of the Ronkonkoma Moraine, which runs east to west along the center of the Town of Brookhaven, and marks where the glacier which formed Long Island stopped its advance.

== Fire lookout tower ==
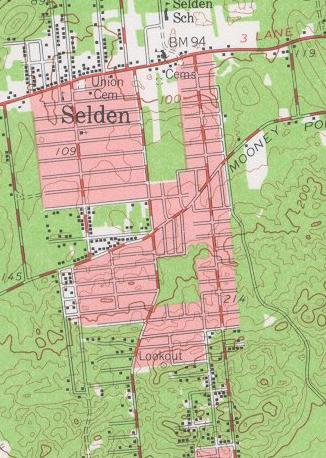
1956 USGS Map excerpt showing location of Telescope Hill fire tower marked "Lookout" in bottom half of map

Beginning in 1918, a series of fire lookout towers were constructed on Long Island to aid in the fighting of wildfires. The first constructed was on Telescope Hill in the fall of 1918 (only two were constructed that year), and went into operation in March 1919. The tower was a 60-foot Aermotor LS40 model, with a cab placed on top. The Telescope Hill tower reported 120 fires between March 17 and June 15, 1919.

Visitors were invited to climb the tower and enjoy the view.

The first fire observer was Al Lucas, who served for two years, followed by Frank Forsyth, who served until 1948. Starting in 1922, the Suffolk County fire observers were supervised by State District Fire Ranger Clarence Dare of Selden.

During World War II, a new cab was built below the original cab to be used for fire watching, and the original was used by Civil Defense observers. Nazi "U-Boats" were spotted three times from Telescope Hill, one of which was captured after being spotted.

As suburban growth spread through the area and fire tower use began to decline across the country, the State ended its support of fire towers on Long Island after the 1959 season. The Telescope Hill tower was removed in 1960.

== Radio tower ==
Telescope Hill currently hosts radio tower facilities at its summit, including the facilities that broadcast WALK-FM.
