= Bald Hill (Farmingville, New York) =

Mountain in New York, United States

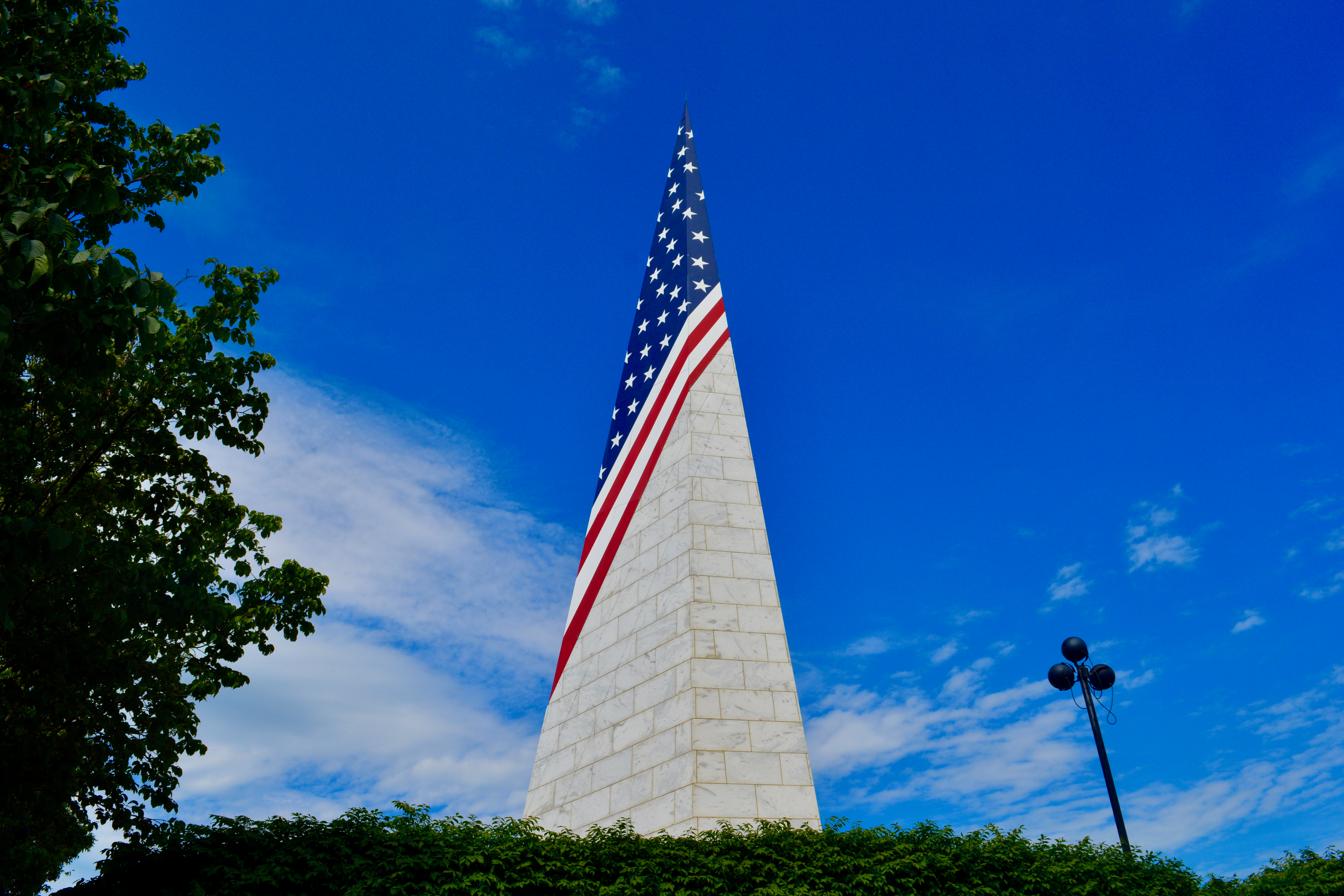
- The Vietnam Veterans Memorial atop Bald Hill.

Highest point
- Elevation: 331 ft (101 m)
- Coordinates: 40°50′37.8924″N 73°1′17.8212″W

Geography
- Location within New York
- Location: Farmingville, New York, United States
- Parent range: Ronkonkoma Moraine
- Topo map: USGS Brookhaven

Climbing
- Easiest route: Road

Bald Hill, located in the hamlet of Farmingville, New York, part of the Town of Brookhaven, is one of the highest areas of elevation on Long Island. The highest elevation in the Bald Hill area is 331 feet (101 m). Though local residents often claim it to be the highest point on Long Island, that distinction actually belongs to Jayne's Hill in the Town of Huntington at 401 feet (122 m). Also, nearby Telescope Hill, about 0.8 miles (1.3 km) WSW, is slightly higher at 334 feet (102 m). Bald Hill in Brookhaven should also not be confused with Bald Hill in Riverhead.

== History ==
The Bald Hill area is part of the Ronkonkoma Moraine, which runs east to west along the center of the Town of Brookhaven, and marks where the glacier which formed Long Island stopped its advance. When first settled in the late 18th century, the area was called "Bald Hills." While the elevation and views are impressive for Long Island, George Washington found the hills to be merely "trifling" when he passed through in April 1790.

In 1897, the cross-Island Bicycle Path was opened and passed through the Bald Hill area.

In 1970–71, Patchogue-Mt. Sinai Road (County Route 83) was built through the Bald Hill area. Two overlooks were constructed in a widened median area with automobile access, and stone markers were placed for "Danger Hill" and "Breakneck Hill", the names given to the two hills by early settlers. A Vietnam Veterans memorial was opened on the southern lookout side in 1991 (elevation 321 feet).

The Brookhaven Town Hall and Sachem East High School are on the east side of the hill. The Glacier Ridge Preserve to the north of the structures has a network of 11 miles (18 km) of cross-country bicycle trails.

=== Bald Hill Ski Bowl ===
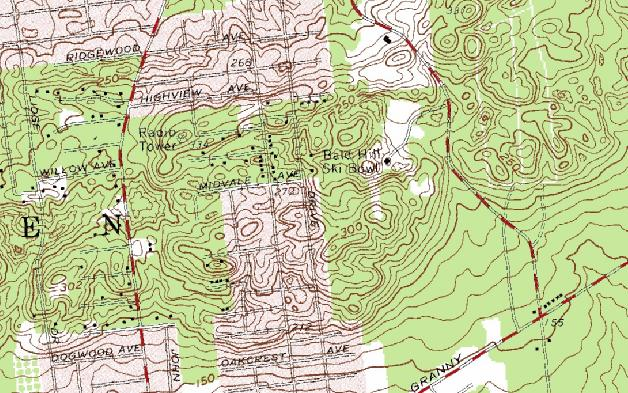
1967 USGS Map excerpt showing location of Bald Hill Ski Bowl. Bottom of main ski run was near spot marked on map; the main skiing summit lay directly to south. To NNE, summit marked "331" is now north side of Vietnam Veterans Memorial Park. Summit marked "Radio Tower" and "334" to W is Telescope Hill.

From 1965 to 1980, Bald Hill was the site of a Town-owned skiing area known as the Bald Hill Ski Bowl.

The seeds for this project were planted in 1964, when Suffolk County builder Henry Taca approached the Town with plans to build houses on his 229 acres (0.93 km^{2}) in the area, including the hilly Bald Hill tract. He turned over 64 acres (260,000 m^{2}) of the Bald Hill property to the Town free of charge in 1965, and in return, he received Town approval for a "cluster housing" project known as Hawthorne Estates. Under the approval, he was allowed to build more houses on his remaining acreage than would otherwise be permitted.

The Bald Hill Ski Bowl officially opened on January 21, 1965, with a 710-foot (220 m) tow rope in operation on a wide main slope, which featured an 800-foot (240 m) run and 123-foot (37 m) vertical drop. At its opening, it was hoped that with the use of snow machines, the slopes and trails would be usable for an average of 70 days each winter. Initial prices were $3 for an all-day ticket, $2 for a half-day ticket after 1 P.M., and 25 cents for a single ski-tow trip. By January 1967, an 800-foot (240 m) T-bar lift had been installed to supplement three tow ropes ranging from 150 to 800 feet (240 m) in length, and there were five ski trails on three slopes. A Swiss-chalet style lodge with a fireplace was also added.

In 1975, The New York Times reported that the ski area was drawing 5,000 visitors each week. The facility was described as covering 106 acres (0.43 km^{2}) and featuring a 1,400-foot (430 m) run for advanced skiers, a slope for "novices", and a "bunny run" for beginners. The cost for an all-day ticket was $2.25. However, new "quiet" snow machines were in the process of being installed to quell complaints about noise from neighboring residents, and some members of the Town Board were complaining that the facility was costing too much and should perhaps be closed. Operating costs were reported to be $500,000 annually, with revenue of between $100,000 and $200,000, depending on the amount of snowfall.

Fortunes turned briefly for the better in the winter of 1976–1977, when generous snowfall (over 62 inches (1,600 mm) in Suffolk County) gave the Ski Bowl its first profitable year. But the warmer winter of 1979–80 proved to be catastrophic for the Ski Bowl’s profitability. As of late January 1980, the ski bowl had only been open eight days for the season. Only 6,500 skiers visited that winter, only 11 inches (280 mm) of snow fell, and revenues fell to $18,000. As the next winter approached, the Town searched for a private operator willing to take over the facility, an unlikely prospect in light of Long Island's weather and the site's historical unprofitability. With the facility's budget slashed by over 70%, and a plan to open only if natural snowfall was sufficient, Bald Hill's time as Long Island's largest public skiing facility were at an end.

The ski bowl site is now home of the Brookhaven Amphitheater. The ski lodge building remains as an art gallery, and sits to the right of the audience as they face the stage.

== Attractions ==
- Vietnam Veterans Memorial Park. A Vietnam Veterans Memorial was dedicated on November 11, 1991, and includes a 100-foot (30 m) high obelisk-shaped monument painted red, white, and blue. The planning for the $1.5 million project began in 1986, when the Suffolk County Vietnam Veterans Memorial Commission was formed. A design contest received over 1,300 entries, and the winning design was submitted by Bob Fox, a Vietnam veteran from Massachusetts.
- Overlooks. Accessible via Patchogue-Mt. Sinai Road (County Route 83), also the site of the Vietnam memorial. On a clear day, you can see to Fire Island in the south and Long Island Sound to the north.
- Pennysaver Amphitheater. An outdoor performing venue with a capacity of over 18,000, part of the Bald Hill Cultural Center.
