= Thee Phantom =

- Birth name: Jeffrey M. McNeill
- Born: July 11
- Origin: Philadelphia, Pennsylvania
- Genres: Hip-Hop
- Labels: Invisible Man Productions (Independent)

Thee Phantom (born Jeffrey M. McNeill; July 11, in Philadelphia) is an artist who specializes in combining Hip-Hop with live orchestration by recording and performing with classically trained musicians, including forming his own "Illharmonic Orchestra". He wrote his first rhyme at the age of 8 and made his first beat by mixing the instrumental from the Beastie Boys’ Paul Revere with Beethoven’s Fifth Symphony at age 12. Most notably, in 2002 Phantom became the first Hip-Hop artist to perform at Philadelphia’s prestigious Kimmel Center with musical accompaniment from members of the world-renowned Philadelphia Orchestra and Chamber Orchestra of Philadelphia. Phantom was invited back in 2003 to perform at the Kimmel Center’s annual Summer Solstice Celebration. Accompanied by a string quartet, concert pianist and a sitar player, he performed to a capacity crowd in the 650-seat Perelman Theater. In June 2006, Phantom graced the stage of the Kimmel Center’s 2,500-seat Verizon Hall with a string section, brass section, female vocalist, a DJ and a trio of breakdancers. In October 2006, Phantom made his television debut on Philadelphia's NBC 10 Show, performing with a string trio and a female vocalist named, "The Phoenix".

In 2003–2004, Phantom's independently released single entitled, “Storming the Bastille” b/w "A Million MC's", received airplay on over 300 college and independent radio stations in the U.S., topping the charts at WGBB and WSIA in New York among others. "Storming" has also reached the airwaves in Germany, Japan, Sweden, Italy, Spain, Croatia, the UK, Singapore, Australia, Ireland, Africa, and France.

In 2006, Phantom completed and released his debut album, entitled Thee Phantom's Hero Complex, on his independent label Invisible Man Productions. Thee Phantom nearly discontinued the album and his career after his best friend, Dr. Jason Porter, was murdered in Atlanta. However, after a year-long hiatus he was convinced to resume recording and to honor Jason's memory by dedicating the album to him.

== Musicians and vocalists ==
Musicians and vocalists that Thee Phantom has performed and/or recorded with include:

- Gloria Justen - Violin/Arranger - Philadelphia Orchestra, Chamber Orchestra of Philadelphia - Website
- Andrea Coln "The Phoenix" - Vocalist
- James Hill - Vocalist
- Verso - MC - Myspace Page
- Veronica Jurkiewicz - Viola
- Joanne Yun - Cello
- Jack Drummond Jr - String Specialist - Myspace Site
- Monica McIntyre - Cello - Website
- Owen "Fiidla" Brown - String Specialist - Website
- DJ Kingspin - DJ - MystiQuintet - Myspace Site
- Kenneth Bean - Trumpet - Myspace Site
- Chuck Treece - Drummer/Musician - Myspace Site
- Daniel DeJesus - Violin, Cello
- Mike Ireland - Viola
- Reef the Lost Cauze - MC
- Side Effect - MC - Myspace Site
- Verbal Tec - MC - Myspace Site
- Robert Randolph - Trumpet
- Jamal Jones - Trumpet
- Richard Magill - Trumpet
- Mei-Chen Liao Barnes - Violin - Chamber Orchestra of Philadelphia
- Elizabeth Kaderabek - Violin - Chamber Orchestra of Philadelphia
- James Cooper - Cello - Chamber Orchestra of Philadelphia
- Renard Edwards - Viola - Philadelphia Orchestra (first African-American musician to play for the Philadelphia Orchestra)
- Adam Lesnick - Brass/Arranger
- Angela Cage - Violin -
- Vicki Scotto - Violin
- Jeremy Lambert - Viola
- Andy Borkowski - Cello
- Andrew Siddons - Trombone
- Ben Morgan - Sitar
- Antonio Stewart - Viola
- Yoomi Kwon - Cello
- Laura Scalzo - Violin
- Matthew D. Morrison - Violin Website
- Christopher Wojahn - Violin
