= Catholic Health Amphitheater at Bald Hill =

Outdoor concert venue in New York, United States

- Interactive map of Catholic Health Amphitheater at Bald Hill
- Former names: Brookhaven Amphitheater (1980s–2012); Pennysaver Amphitheater at Bald Hill (2012–2018); Long Island Community Hospital Amphitheater (2018–2023)
- Location: 1 Ski Run Ln; Farmingville, New York
- Coordinates: 40.843859°N 73.021617°W
- Owner: Town of Brookhaven
- Capacity: 3,000 (seats); 4,000 (grass area)
- Type: Amphitheater

Construction
- Built: 1980s

Website
- champbaldhill.com

The Catholic Health Amphitheater at Bald Hill (see below for previous names), located at Bald Hill, is an outdoor concert venue owned by the Town of Brookhaven, and located in Farmingville, New York, United States. It has approximately 3,000 seats, and a capacity of 7,000 including lawn seating of over 4,000. The venue has changed names a number of times after being known as the Brookhaven Amphitheater for many years.

== History ==
Though outdoor concerts have been held at Bald Hill since as far back as 1965, the current amphitheater was built in the late 1980s (replacing earlier portable and simpler stages) on the location of the former Bald Hill Ski Bowl, and modeled after venues such as the PNC Bank Arts Center in Holmdel Township, New Jersey. It has been compared to such venues as the Red Rocks Amphitheatre in Colorado and the Hollywood Bowl in Los Angeles.

The venue does not share the same popularity as the Jones Beach Theater also located on Long Island, however many concertgoers have praised the sight lines. Throughout the years the theater has hosted musical acts such as Blondie, James Brown, B.B. King, Pat Benatar, Alice Cooper, Cheap Trick, Twisted Sister and the 2002 Metal Edge Rockfest. The venue has also hosted family-friendly movie nights.

The Town of Brookhaven's management of the facility has not always been smooth. One black mark occurred in the early 1990s, when a local promoter booked several high-profile shows that never happened, and failed to issue refunds, causing lawsuits to be brought against the town. Another venue manager was allegedly fired in 2002. From 2004 to 2008, the venue ran a deficit of more than $3.9 million. The Town planned to stop providing more funding in the fall of 2008, but later decided to host at least three shows in 2009.

In 2012, the Brookhaven Town Board approved a five-year agreement with JVC Broadcasting to manage the venue, and that June it was announced that the facility would be renamed the Pennysaver Amphitheater at Bald Hill. In 2018 the venue was renamed Long Island Community Hospital Amphitheater after signing a deal with Long Island Community Hospital. In April, 2023 Catholic Health and Long Island Events announced a new partnership, giving Catholic Health naming rights for the venue which was renamed Catholic Health Amphitheater at Bald Hill.
