= WKJY =

Radio station in Hempstead, New York

- Hempstead, New York; United States
- Broadcast area: Nassau County, New York
- Frequency: 98.3 MHz
- Branding: K-Joy 98.3

Programming
- Language: English
- Format: Adult contemporary music

Ownership
- Owner: Connoisseur Media; (Connoisseur Media Licenses, LLC)
- Sister stations: WALK-FM; WHLI; WWSK; WWWF-FM

History
- First air date: July 15, 1947
- Former call signs: WHNY (1947–1948); WHLI-FM (1948–1975); WIOK (1975–1980); WKJY (1980–1986); WMGG (1986)
- Call sign meaning: K Joy

Technical information
- Licensing authority: FCC
- Facility ID: 38338
- Class: A
- ERP: 3,000 watts
- HAAT: 100 meters (330 ft)
- Transmitter coordinates: 40°41′8.3″N 73°36′35.4″W
- Translator: 107.1 W296CQ (Hempstead)

Links
- Public license information: Public file; LMS
- Webcast: Listen live
- Website: www.kjoy.com

WKJY (98.3 FM) is a radio station licensed to serve Hempstead, New York. It broadcasts an adult contemporary music radio format, and is owned by Connoisseur Media. WKJY's studios and offices are located at Airport Plaza in Farmingdale, New York, and its transmitter is located near the Southern State Parkway in Hempstead.

== History ==
=== Early years ===
The station first signed on the air on July 15, 1947, as WHNY. It was owned by the FM Broadcasting Company, along with AM sister station WHLI. In 1949 the call letters were changed to WHLI-FM. For its first two decades, the station mostly simulcast WHLI.

=== Beautiful music ===
In the late 1960s, the FCC was encouraging AM-FM combos to offer different programming. WHLI-FM began playing beautiful music while WHLI 1100 continued its middle of the road music format. Trying to carve out a separate identity, WHLI-FM changed its call letters in 1975 to WIOK.

In 1980, it switched call signs again, this time to WKJY representing the moniker "K-Joy".

=== Adult contemporary ===
During the 1980s, as the easy listening audience began to age, the station switched to a soft adult contemporary format. In the 1990s, the tempo picked up and the format moved to standard adult contemporary music. WKJY and WHLI were acquired by Barnstable Broadcasting in 1984.

Along with WBZO, WHLI, and WIGX, WKJY was purchased by Connoisseur Media from Barnstable Broadcasting for $23 million in 2012. Previously known as "K-Joy 98.3", the station changed its branding to K 98.3 in July 2013. The K-Joy brand was revived on May 17, 2019.

=== Anti-gay hoax ===
On February 13, 2014, an anti-gay note allegedly sent by a Baldwin mother in response to a birthday party invite from two gay dads was a hoax carried out by two of the station's disc jockeys. The hosts of the K-98.3 Morning Show, Steve Harper – also the station's program director – and Leanna Karlson, admitted the weekend after that the story was "totally fictitious" and that they fabricated it to "spur a healthy discourse on a highly passionate topic". An apology was posted on the radio station's website.

The statement said that the hoax was perpetrated without the knowledge of the station's management. The fabricated RSVP was first posted to the radio station's Facebook page. The photo of the party invite had been scrawled with a response supposedly from a homophobic mother that included statements such as, "I will not subject my innocent son to your 'lifestyle.'" The radio station's management issued a statement saying it has a responsibility to its listeners to be accurate, and is looking at "all courses of action". The station announced on the evening of February 16 that the two hosts were suspended for one week.
