= WALK-FM =

Radio station in Patchogue, New York

- Patchogue, New York; United States
- Broadcast area: Long Island
- Frequency: 97.5 MHz (HD Radio)
- Branding: WALK 97.5

Programming
- Language: English
- Format: Hot adult contemporary
- Subchannels: HD2: Simulcast of WWSK (mainstream rock)
- Affiliations: Compass Media Networks; Skyview Networks

Ownership
- Owner: Connoisseur Media; (Connoisseur Media Licenses, LLC)
- Sister stations: WHLI; WKJY; WWSK; WWWF-FM

History
- First air date: December 12, 1952
- Former call signs: WFSS (1946–1952; before launch)

Technical information
- Licensing authority: FCC
- Facility ID: 10137
- Class: B
- ERP: 39,000 watts
- HAAT: 169 meters (554 ft)
- Transmitter coordinates: 40°50′41.3″N 73°01′59.3″W

Links
- Public license information: Public file; LMS
- Webcast: Listen live
- Website: www.walkradio.com

WALK-FM (97.5 FM) is a hot adult contemporary radio station licensed to serve Patchogue, New York, and covering Long Island. The station is owned by Connoisseur Media, with studios and offices located at Airport Plaza in Farmingdale, New York, and its transmitter located on Telescope Hill in Farmingville, New York. WALK-FM broadcasts in the HD Radio hybrid format with its HD2 channel carrying the mainstream rock programming of co-owned 94.3 WWSK.

== History ==
=== 1952 to 1999 ===
WALK-FM first signed on the air on December 12, 1952. It was owned by the Suffolk Broadcasting Corporation, and was the FM counterpart to co-owned WALK (1370 AM). WALK was a daytimer station, so WALK-FM allowed listeners with FM radios to hear the programming after sunset. In its early years, WALK-AM-FM played classical music, big band, adult standards and jazz. WALK-FM was originally powered at 15,000 watts, only heard in the western part of Suffolk County.

The WALK stations were purchased in 1963 by the Island Broadcasting System along with their sister station in Riverhead, WRIV. Island Broadcasting was owned in part by NBC News anchorman Chet Huntley. In 1997, WALK-AM-FM were acquired by Chancellor Communications.

One of WALK-FM's longest running shows was "Klein 'til 9 and Again 'til 10" hosted by Bob Klein. Klein was the morning drive time disc jockey from 1966 to 1992. Klein died in 2014 at age 92.

WALK-FM was one of the first stations on Long Island to run all Christmas music during the holiday season, beginning weeks before Christmas. The all-holiday format began in 1995 on AM 1370 WALK. Beginning in 2002, it was run on both WALK AM and FM. It continues to run on WALK-FM annually from a week or two before Thanksgiving through Christmas Day.

=== 2000s ===
In 2000, WALK-AM-FM were acquired by Clear Channel Communications. In 2014, Clear Channel switched its name to iHeartMedia, Inc.

The WALK Breakfast Club, the weekday morning show now hosted by Mark Daniels and Cindy, was featured on ABC's Good Morning America in December 2005. A GMA reporter was live on national TV, asking Mark and Cindy about playing all holiday music on radio stations. After the report, Cindy jokingly accused Mark of paying off the photographer since the camera was only focusing on Mark.

Long-time WALK-FM DJ Dave Shnayer, known as "JD Howard" on-air, died on November 17, 2007, after a three-year battle with non-Hodgkin lymphoma. The death was announced the following afternoon by Holly Levis.

=== 2010s ===
WALK-FM dropped the slogan "Yesterday and Today", switching to "Long Island's Best Variety" in May 2010. Around that time, the station began decreasing the amount of music from the 1970s to one-to-two songs per hour, starting the transition to a hotter AC format. Eventually, music from the 1970s was eliminated, and music from the 1980s has been scaled back.

By July 2012, the station's tempo had increased to where it was no longer playing mainstream adult contemporary but had switched to a hot adult contemporary format as Mediabase moved it to the "Hot AC Panel". However, WALK-FM continued on the Nielsen BDS AC panel.

On May 15, 2014, Qantum Communications announced that it would acquire WALK-AM-FM from the Aloha Station Trust in exchange for transferring its existing 29 stations to Clear Channel. Qantum immediately sold WALK-AM-FM to Connoisseur Media, making them sister stations to Nassau County-based AC station 98.3 WKJY. The transaction was consummated on September 9, 2014. The WALK stations were split up in late 2019, after Connoisseur donated the AM station to Cantico Nuevo Ministry, which renamed it WLID.

On January 2, 2020, WALK-FM added Anna & Raven (based out of sister station WEZN-FM in Bridgeport) for mornings. WALK was the show's 2nd affiliate, as it went national later that year.

On February 3, 2026, WALK-FM added another syndicated show as it picked up Skyview Networks' "XYZ with Erik Zachary" from 9am-2pm.

=== Christmas Music ===
WALK-FM plays Christmas music, usually switching its playlist on the third Friday of November and the Friday before Thanksgiving at 5:00 p.m. ET where an afternoon host was joined by a celebrity guest to lead the countdown and pick the first Christmas song of the year.

== HD Radio ==
In mid-2006, WALK-FM began broadcasting in the HD Radio hybrid format. Weeks later, WALK-FM began playing country music on its HD2 subchannel, which Clear Channel Communications claimed was the first country station on Long Island in years. Programming on WALK-FM-HD2 was discontinued after the sale of the station to Connoisseur Media. WALK-FM-HD2 returned to the air in 2017 with sister station WWSK 94.3 FM "The Shark" now heard on the HD2 signal. The Shark is a mainstream rock station also serving Suffolk County.

== Awards ==
In 2007, the station was nominated for the Adult Contemporary Station of the Year Award by Radio & Records magazine for the top 25 U.S. radio markets. Other nominees included WMJX in Boston, KOST in Los Angeles, WLTW in New York City, WBEB in Philadelphia and KEZK-FM in St. Louis.
