= WCRN =

- Worcester, Massachusetts; United States
- Broadcast area: Central Massachusetts
- Frequency: 830 kHz
- Branding: Radio Central 830 WCRN

Programming
- Format: Brokered programming; news/talk; oldies
- Affiliations: Fox News Radio; WFXT; Boston Red Sox Radio Network

Ownership
- Owner: Carter Broadcasting Corporation
- Operator: Red Apple Media

History
- First air date: December 5, 1994
- Call sign meaning: Carter Radio Network

Technical information
- Licensing authority: FCC
- Facility ID: 9201
- Class: B
- Power: 50,000 watts
- Transmitter coordinates: 42°14′50.33″N 71°55′50.26″W

Links
- Public license information: Public file; LMS
- Webcast: Listen live
- Website: wcrnradio.com

WCRN (830 AM) is a radio station in Worcester, Massachusetts, owned by Carter Broadcasting. The station broadcasts with a transmitter power output of 50,000 watts, its signal is directional, pointed away from other stations on 830 kHz. After sunset, WCRN's signal is made further directional towards the east; as a result, it is not clearly audible in Western Massachusetts.

WCRN is branded "Radio Central", with a talk radio format. It simulcasts news from WFXT (channel 25) in the mornings, airs locally-based brokered programming mid-days, and airs music from the 1960s, 1970s, and 1980s at night as "North Star Music".

== History ==
WCRN signed on December 5, 1994, carrying religious programming from the Carter Radio Network, based out of then-sister station WROL in Boston. In December 2000, this was abandoned in favor of a big band format, "Swing 830". The format was changed to oldies, via ABC Radio's The True Oldies Channel, in August 2004, and then to a talk radio format on May 8, 2006.

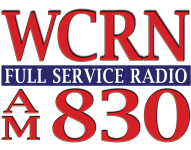
Logo as "Full Service Radio"

In 2000, the station was allowed to increase its daytime power from 5,000 watts to 50,000 watts. Nighttime power was also increased from 5,000 watts to 50,000 watts on April 4, 2007, just in time for the first Boston Red Sox night game of the season.

WCRN was the flagship for the Worcester Tornadoes independent-league baseball team during the 2005 and 2010 seasons. The station is also an affiliate of the University of Massachusetts Amherst network for football and men's basketball broadcasts.

From 2007 through 2009, and since 2011, WCRN has shared the Worcester affiliation of the Boston Red Sox Radio Network with WEEI/WEEI-FM satellite station WVEI, an arrangement made to take advantage of WCRN's then-new 50,000-watt night signal to serve areas of MetroWest that had difficulty receiving either WVEI itself or the team's then-flagship, WRKO, particularly at night (when most Red Sox games are played), with WVEI selling local advertising on both stations. The two stations replaced WTAG, which had carried Sox games for 40 years. WVEI became the sole Red Sox affiliate in Worcester in 2010, but WCRN returned to the Red Sox network in 2011.

In May 2026, Carter Broadcasting filed to sell WCRN to John Catsimatidis' Red Apple Media, owner of WABC in New York City, for $1.45 million. Red Apple also entered into a local marketing agreement to program the station ahead of the deal's completion. The deal, first reached in November 2025, marked Red Apple Media's first acquisition outside the New York metropolitan area.
