= Alan Fredericks =

American disc jockey

Alan Fredericks (September 11, 1934 – July 31, 2005) was an American disc jockey and award-winning travel editor and journalist.

Fredericks was born Alfred Paul Israel in Bronx, New York. He graduated from Bronx High School of Science and New York University. He also earned an M.A. in Liberal Studies from The New School for Social Research in 1987.

He began using the name Alan Fredericks as a twenty-year-old disc jockey in 1954. Fredericks hosted the "Night Train" radio show, which specialized in the music of doo-wop groups, on radio stations WGBB, WHOM, and WADO from the late 1950s to 1964, and his radio show was sponsored for a time by Times Square Records. In later years, he would sometimes be a guest host on WCBS-FM on Don K. Reed's "Doo-Wop Shop," and also participated in several of the station's radio greats reunions.

Fredericks changed careers from radio to the print media in 1966 and was hired by the Associated Press wire service, where he was assigned to the rewrite desk. Several months later in 1966 he was hired as an associate editor of Travel Weekly magazine, and he quickly rose to managing editor in 1967. Fredericks then served as the magazine's top editor from 1972 until 1997. In 1995, he was named travel journalist of the year by the American Society of Travel Agents, becoming the first writer for a trade publication to receive the award.

Fredericks died of cancer at age 70 at his home in Old Bridge, New Jersey.
