= Firehorse =

American singer-songwriter (born 1979)

- Born: Leah Siegel; January 14, 1979 (age 47); Brooklyn, New York City
- Genres: Alternative rock, experimental rock
- Occupations: Singer-songwriter, musician
- Instruments: Vocals, guitar, violin
- Years active: 2004–present
- Labels: Leah Siegel, Walk Don't Run Records, Pledgemusic
- Website: thisisfirehorse.com

Leah Siegel (born January 14, 1979), known professionally as Firehorse, is an American singer-songwriter and musician.

== Career ==
Leah Siegel is the daughter of Robert Siegel and Jane Siegel.

Siegel wrote a song in a commercial for Topsy Foundation, which promotes early childhood development in the Mpumalanga province of South Africa. The commercial won a Clio Award, Grand LIA and award at Cannes, in addition to being named an "ad worth spreading" by the nonprofit group TED Conference. The 90-second clip was shown in its entirety in the It's not all doom and gloom section of Russell Howard's Good News on BBC2 in 2010.

Siegel co-wrote the theme for Haven with Andre Fratto.

Siegel's latest album is under the alias Firehorse and contains the completed version of the song If You Don't Want To Be Alone used in the Topsy Foundation commercial.

Siegel is involved in a number of side projects: she fronts the vintage soul/R&B outfit Brooklyn Boogaloo Blowout, sings in the Citizens Band, a cabaret collective featuring musicians from the group Beirut, and in Leisure Cruise with former Broken Social Scene member Dave Hodge. She has a clothing line in the works.

== Influences ==
Her musical influences are Joni Mitchell, Judy Garland, Doris Day, Nina Simone and Janis Joplin.

== Discography ==
=== As Firehorse ===
- And so they ran faster... (2011)
- Pills From Strangers (2013)

=== With Leisure Cruise ===
- Leisure Cruise (2014)
- Mind Eraser (EP) (2020)

=== As Leah Siegel ===
==== Albums ====
- Leah Siegel Presents (2004)
- Little Mule (2006)

==== Extended plays ====
- The Lemon (2005)
