= Bald Hill Schoolhouse =

- U.S. National Register of Historic Places
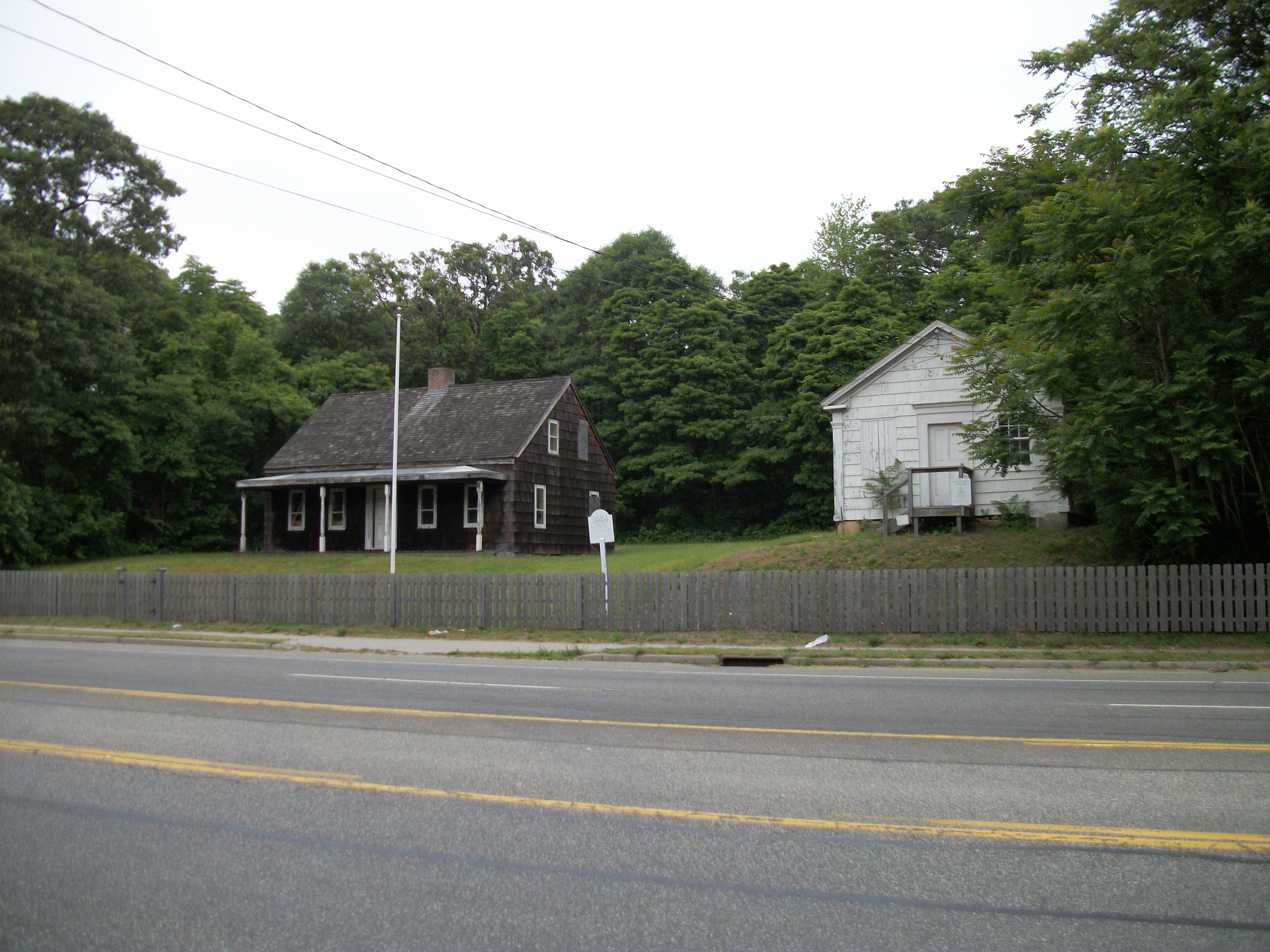
- The historic Bald Hill Schoolhouse from across Horse Block Road.

- Location within New York Location within the United States
- Location: Horse Block Road, Farmingville, New York
- Coordinates: 40°50′6″N 73°2′34″W
- Area: 2 acres (0.81 ha)
- Built: 1850
- Architectural style: Greek Revival
- NRHP reference No.: 88001018
- Added to NRHP: July 21, 1988

Bald Hill Schoolhouse is a historic one-room school building located at Farmingville in Suffolk County, New York. It was built in 1850 and is a small, one story, vernacular rural schoolhouse with Greek Revival style detailing. It measures approximately 18 feet by 28 feet. It closed for classroom instruction in 1929. Also on the property are boy's and girl's privies, a small woodshed, and a house formerly owned by a member of the Terry family.

It was added to the National Register of Historic Places in 1988.

The school is located in Farmingville Hills Park and is owned by the Farmingville Hills Historical Society, which plans to operate the schoolhouse as a museum.
