= WWWF-FM =

Radio station in Bay Shore, New York

- Bay Shore, New York; United States
- Broadcast area: Long Island
- Frequency: 103.1 MHz
- Branding: 103.1 The Wolf

Programming
- Language: English
- Format: Country music

Ownership
- Owner: Connoisseur Media; (Connoisseur Media Licenses, LLC)
- Sister stations: WALK-FM; WHLI; WKJY; WWSK

History
- First air date: February 1993
- Former call signs: WQIA (1992); WBSI (1992–1993); WBZO (1993–2024)
- Call sign meaning: "Wolf" with 2 added Ws

Technical information
- Licensing authority: FCC
- Facility ID: 60245
- Class: A
- ERP: 1,550 watts
- HAAT: 141 meters (463 ft)
- Transmitter coordinates: 40°45′03″N 73°12′49″W
- Repeater: 99.9 WEZN-HD2 (Bridgeport, Connecticut)

Links
- Public license information: Public file; LMS
- Webcast: Listen live
- Website: www.thewolf1031.com

WWWF-FM (103.1 MHz) is a country music radio station owned by Connoisseur Media and licensed to serve Bay Shore, New York. The station's studios are located at Airport Plaza in Farmingdale, New York, and its transmitter is located on Freeman Avenue in Islip, New York.

== History ==
103.1 FM first signed on the air in February 1993 as WBSI "B-103", broadcasting from studios located on Sunrise Highway in Bay Shore and playing oldies from the 1950s, 1960s, and 1970s. The WBSI call sign was dropped only a few months after the station signed on because 106.1 WBLI complained the WBSI call sign was too similar and would cause confusion in the Arbitron ratings.

WBZO – along with WHLI, WKJY, and WWSK — was sold by Barnstable Broadcasting to Connoisseur Media effective July 3, 2012, for $23 million.

On April 7, 2014, WBZO relaunched its classic hits format, shifting from a 60-70s pop-based music mix to a 70s-80s rock-based music mix. A year later, on May 15, 2015, WBZO rebranded as "103.1 Max FM".

In September 2022, the on-air staff was let go due to budget cuts; WBZO would run automated for the rest of the format's run.

On March 19, 2024, Connoisseur Media announced that the station would flip to country music as "103.1 The Wolf" at 10:31 a.m. the following day. The change took place at the time promised; following a block of departure-themed songs to end the "Max" format ("The Final Countdown" by Europe, "Movin' Out (Anthony's Song)" by Billy Joel, "That's All" by Genesis and "New Kid in Town" by The Eagles), the station launched the "Wolf" format with "How Country Feels" by Randy Houser.

With the flip, Connoisseur Media applied for a call sign change to WWWF-FM, and the station would officially adopt the call sign on the 26th. The move returns the country format to a majority of the western Long Island area; while the eastern portion is served by WJVC, it has signal problems in most of Western Suffolk County. In addition, the format had been missing from that region since the flip of New York station WNSH (which was able to be picked up in the area) in October 2021.

In July 2026, the station began simulcasting on 99.9 WEZN-FM's HD2 subchannel, expanding the station's reach further on Long Island and into Connecticut. That same month, the station's music director and afternoon host Kelly Ford departed the station to take on the same roles at iHeartMedia country stations 93.1 WPOC and 98.7 WMZQ in Baltimore, Maryland and Washington, D.C. respectively.

On September 4, 2026, WWWF retained its country music format and went jockless, stunting with sweepers promoting "something new" to come that following Tuesday, September 8, at 7:15 am. At the said time, the station announced the addition of a new local morning show, Cane & Sabrina, which debuted the following Thursday.
