= WNYH =

Brokered programming radio station in Huntington, New York

- Huntington, New York; United States
- Broadcast area: Long Island
- Frequency: 740 kHz

Programming
- Format: Brokered programming

Ownership
- Owner: WIN Radio Broadcasting Corporation

History
- First air date: September 1, 1951
- Former call signs: WGSM (1951–2005)

Technical information
- Licensing authority: FCC
- Facility ID: 29259
- Class: D
- Power: 25,000 watts (day); 43 watts (night)
- Transmitter coordinates: 40°51′4.35″N 73°26′14.44″W

Links
- Public license information: Public file; LMS

WNYH (740 AM) is a radio station licensed to Huntington, New York, it serves the Long Island area and broadcasts brokered programming. The station is owned by WIN Radio Broadcasting Corporation.

Since 740 AM is a Canadian clear-channel frequency, WNYH reduces its broadcast power to 43 watts at sunset to protect CFZM in Toronto. This results in a limited, approximately 20 square-mile coverage area centered upon Huntington Station for the station at night.

== History ==
The station signed on as WGSM on September 1, 1951, with studios originally in the Sammis Building on New York Avenue in Huntington. Edward J. Fitzgerald founded the station and Jack Ellsworth (WALK, WLIM) was the original program director. In early 1968, the station moved its studios and offices to 900 Walt Whitman Road (Rt. 110) in Melville, New York near the Northern State Parkway. In autumn 1968, Bill Ayres (WABC, WPLJ) and Pete Fornatale (WFUV, WNEW-FM, 92.3 K-Rock) hosted a religious show aimed at young people. Over the years, the station has sported many formats and been owned by many radio groups.

On May 22, 1995, WGSM switched from soft adult contemporary to country music, and its AM stereo system, with local band showcases on the weekend. Then the station simulcast WMJC 94.3; a short time later, new ownership and GM approved the station's switch to becoming the New York area's first Radio Disney affiliate on November 1, 1997, and the AM stereo system was turned off. WGSM lost the Radio Disney affiliation on December 27, 1998, after WQEW became New York City's Radio Disney affiliate. At that time, WGSM began simulcasting the adult standards format of sister station WHLI 1100 AM.

In April 2001, WGSM was sold to K Communications for $2.5 million. The format was changed to Korean language programming. Over the next few years, WGSM spent a lot of time on and off the air. In 2004, a Korean group was contacted by two local radio broadcasters, to lease the station. The two met in his Flushing broadcast center, and presented a proposal to Kwon and two associates to lease the station---then still known as WGSM, to flip it to country, with a secret formatics (A blend of country-rock) to be confidential until the station was announced operational again. The station was playing Korean language and music. The station was then sold to WIN Radio Broadcasting Corporation and changed call sign to WNYH on September 1, 2005.

WNYH began playing an oldies format featuring music from the mid-1940s through the early 1980s.

On October 21, 2008, much of WNYH's broadcast day was leased to One Caribbean Radio, who previously bought time on WSNR 620 AM in Jersey City. Self-proclaimed "Global Mix" music aired sunrise – 10 am and 3 pm – sunset. Between the hours of 10 am and 3 pm programming varied and included infomercials, oldies music, Caribbean music, and brokered talk shows. All the One Caribbean Radio programming was terminated in late March 2009 for an unknown reason, and moved to WSKQ 97.9 FM HD2.

On January 1, 2011, the format was replaced by Radio Cantico Nuevo, a Spanish Christian format.

In December 2019, the format was replaced by Korean Christian Broadcasting Network (KCBN). The following month, the format was replaced again with a rhythm and blues/gospel music format under the "Inspiration Radio" moniker.

On September 28, 2020, the format was replaced with a simulcast of WXMC Parsippany, New Jersey, which had previously been simulcast on WBWD Islip.

In December 2020, the format was replaced by Korean Christian Broadcasting Network (KCBN).

In November 2021, Korean programing was replaced by The Overcomer Ministry.

== Translator ==
Call sign	Frequency	City of license	FID	ERP (W)	Class	Transmitter coordinates	FCC info
W264DG	100.7 FM	Islip, New York	144440	250	D	40°48′27.4″N 73°10′46.4″W	LMS
