= Robert Siegel =

American radio journalist (born 1947)

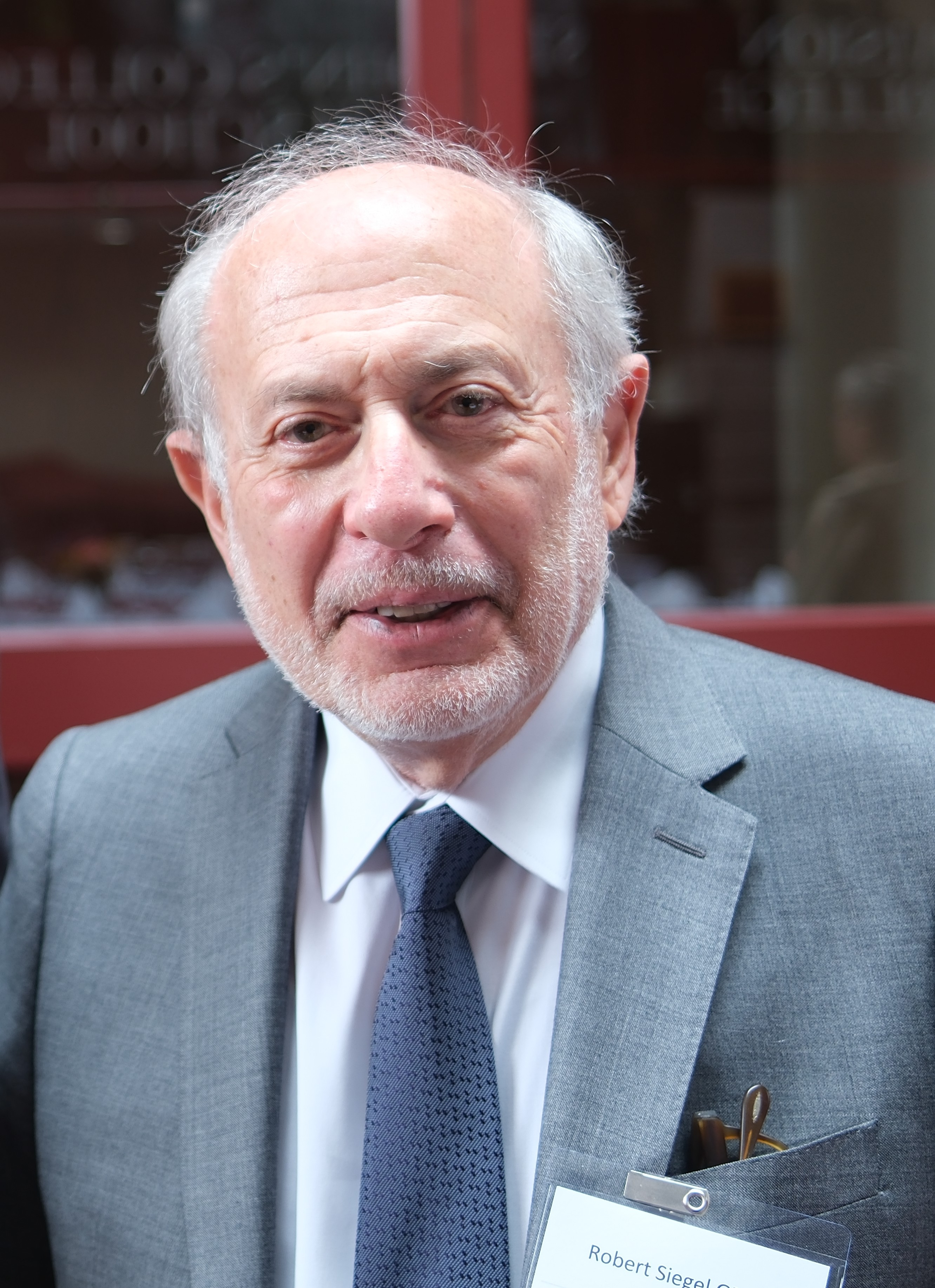
- Siegel in 2026
- Born: June 26, 1947 (age 79); New York City, U.S.
- Education: Columbia University
- Occupation: Broadcast journalist
- Years active: 1971–present
- Known for: All Things Considered Distinctive Voice

Robert Charles Siegel (born June 26, 1947) is an American retired radio journalist. He was one of the co-hosts of the National Public Radio afternoon news broadcast All Things Considered from 1987 until his retirement in January 2018.

== Early life, family and education ==
Siegel was born June 26, 1947, in New York City, to parents Joseph and Edith Siegel (née Joffe). His father was a commercial education teacher, and his mother a secretary at Stuyvesant High School. He grew up at Stuyvesant Town—Peter Cooper Village. His maternal grandfather claimed to descend from rabbinical scholar Mordechai Yoffe, and Siegel has identified on-air as Jewish. After graduating in 1964 from Stuyvesant, Siegel studied at Columbia University, graduating from Columbia College in 1968. During this time, he was an anchor for the reporting of the 1968 Columbia demonstrations at the college radio station, WKCR-FM. He attended Columbia University Graduate School of Journalism for a year.

== Career ==
Siegel's first professional broadcasting job was at WGLI in Babylon, New York, where he "did morning newscasts and a show that was part phone-ins, part Top Forty, all under the pseudonym Bob Charles." After graduate school, he worked for WRVR in New York from 1971 to 1976.

Siegel was hired as a newscaster for NPR in Washington, D.C., in 1976, and he has held various news and production jobs at NPR since then. In broadcasts prior to the Panama Canal Treaty debates, he was referred to as "Bob," rather than his preferred "Robert." From 1979 to 1983 he was based in London, making him the first NPR staffer to be based overseas. Upon his return to America, he became the director of the News and Information Department, and was responsible for overseeing production of both All Things Considered and Morning Edition, as well as the creation of Weekend Edition. Starting in 1987, he was a host of All Things Considered. He took a short break in 1992 to host Talk of the Nation, NPR's call-in talk show. In 2010, Siegel was presented with the John Chancellor Award for Excellence in Journalism by the Columbia University Graduate School of Journalism. Siegel won three Silver Batons from Alfred I. DuPont-Columbia University and the American Bar Association's Silver Gavel Award.

In April 2017, Siegel announced he would end his time with All Things Considered. His last day on the program was January 5, 2018.

Siegel has made cameo appearances in several television shows, including The Simpsons, Northern Exposure, BoJack Horseman and the film Yesterday Was a Lie.

For the weeks of June 5, 2018, and February 17, 2020, Siegel guest-hosted NPR's On Point.

Since September 2025, he has served as a host of The Opinions – The New York Times podcast.

== Personal life ==
In 1973, Siegel married Jane Claudia Schwartz, who worked for the United States Department of Commerce. They have two daughters, Erica Anne Siegel and musician Leah Siegel.
