= Red Apple Media =

American radio broadcasting company

Red Apple Media, Inc.
- Type: Private
- Industry: Mass media
- Genre: Radio broadcasting
- Founded: 2020; 6 years ago
- Founder: John Catsimatidis
- Headquarters: New York City, United States
- Parent: Red Apple Group

Red Apple Media, Inc. is an American radio broadcasting company based in New York City. Owned by John Catsimatidis's Red Apple Group, it owns 770 WABC in New York City, and operates the syndication division Red Apple Audio Networks, which distributes programming from the station.

== History ==
In June 2019, business magnate John Catsimatidis announced his intent to acquire New York City talk radio station WABC from Cumulus Media for $12.5 million; Catsimatidis had already been hosting the syndicated radio show The Cats Roundtable with Salem Media Group, while Cumulus had also sold its former sister station WPLJ to help cover its debt load. He described WABC as being an "iconic" station that he was a long-time listener of, and stated that he wanted to "bring it back to being a great station".

Upon his completion of the acquisition in 2020, he began to expand the station's local lineup, and worked to expand the reach of its content via social media and internet radio. In 2022, Catsimatidis established a syndication division known as Red Apple Audio Networks, which would distribute WABC shows such as Greg Kelly, Rudy Giuliani, Larry Kudlow, Jeanine Pirro, The Cats Roundtable, and its overnight show The Other Side of Midnight. By August 2023, Red Apple Audio Networks had over 200 affiliates carrying its programming, including stations in 15 of the top 25 Nielsen Audio markets.

Catsimatidis did not rule out further station acquisitions besides WABC, having expressed a desire to grow the reach of its programming via syndication throughout the Northeast, in other regions of the United States, and internationally. He told the Los Angeles Times that "whatever we can buy for nothing, we'll buy. They became distressed because of stupid management." In July 2020, Red Apple Media took over Hampton Bays, New York's WLIR-FM under a local marketing agreement, converting the station to a near-simulcast of WABC. Shortly afterward, Red Apple announced an agreement to acquire the station outright for $900,000. In May 2025, Red Apple announced an agreement to acquire WRCR in Haverstraw, New York. In November 2025, Red Apple filed to acquire WLID in Patchogue, New York, and its translators to expand its coverage in the Long Island area, and agreed to acquire WCRN in Worcester, Massachusetts, for $1.45 million—marking its first acquisition outside of the New York metropolitan area.

== Worldwide News Network ==
In May 2026, Red Apple Audio Networks announced that it would launch a radio news service known as the "Worldwide News Network" (WNN) on May 23, 2026, immediately following the planned closure of CBS News Radio on May 22. The network would initially be led by former WINS anchor Lee Harris, who was named vice president of news for WABC and WNN.

The network was designed to attract former CBS News Radio affiliates, maintaining the network's traditional schedule of hourly on-the-hour newscasts (available in three- and six-minute versions), and a one-minute update at 30 minutes past the hour, hiring alumni of the network (such as Cooper Lawrence, Matt Pieper, Bill Rehkopf, and Michael Wallace) as its initial airstaff to maintain familiarity, and maintaining the network's "straight" and objective news reporting. Harris stated that WNN reflected a desire by Catsimatidis to grow his reach internationally, and "expand and maybe even take over the job that used to be done by Voice of America or Radio Free Europe, where we can present America's philosophy on its best footing."

In August 2026, WNN launched a weekend service of business news reports anchored by John Terrett and Jake Novak, with WTOP-FM as one of its first affiliates. That month, Harris stepped down from Red Apple Media after a managerial disagreement.
