= Farmingville, New York =

- Hamlet and census-designated place Town Seat of Brookhaven
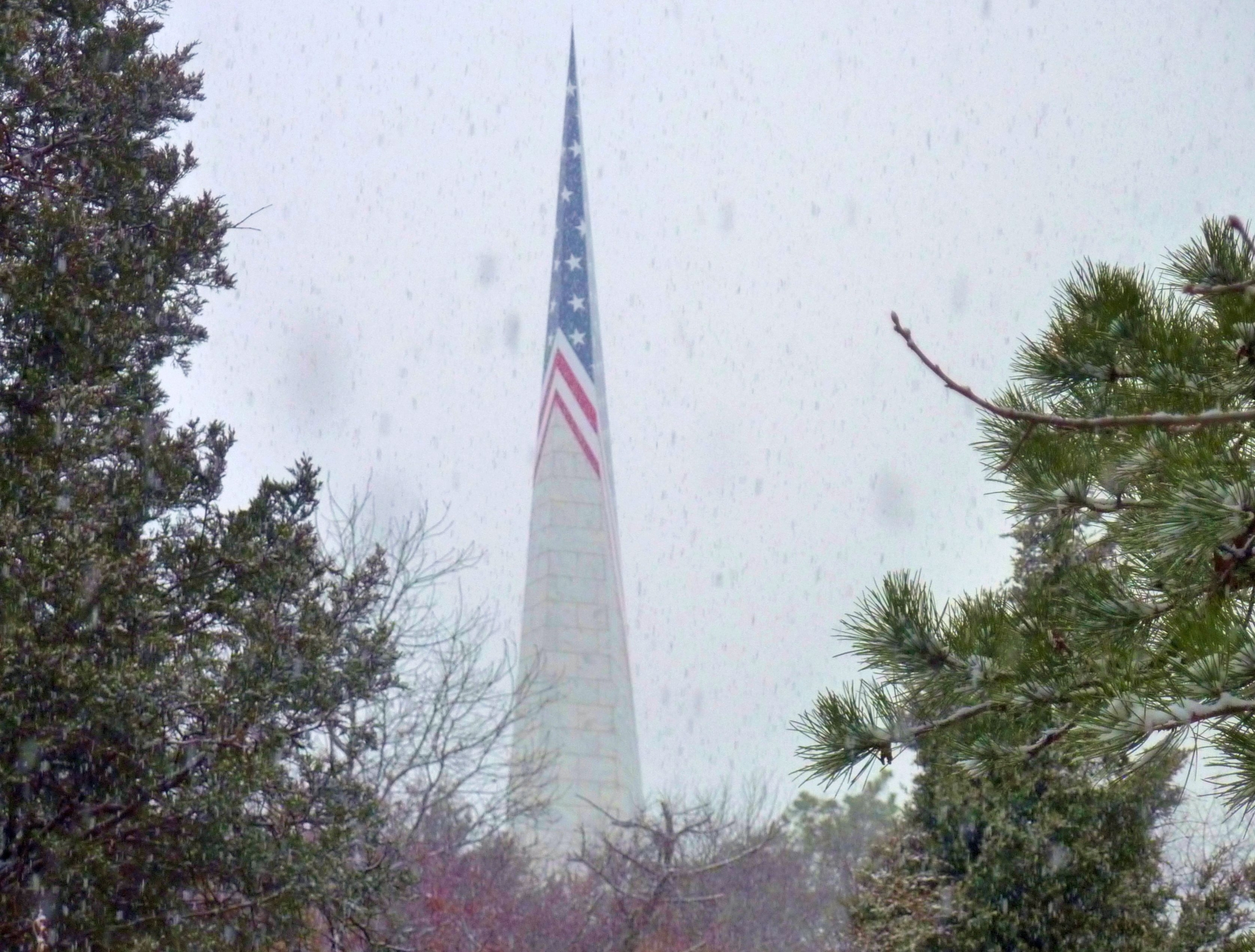
- Vietnam Memorial on Bald Hill

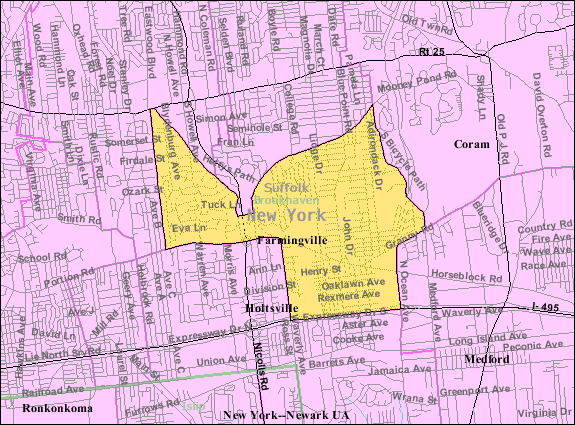
- U.S. Census map

- Location on Long Island Location within the state of New York
- Coordinates: 40°50′33″N 73°2′37″W
- Country: United States
- State: New York
- County: Suffolk
- Town: Brookhaven

Area
  - Total: 4.19 sq mi (10.85 km^{2})
  - Land: 4.19 sq mi (10.85 km^{2})
  - Water: 0 sq mi (0.00 km^{2})
- Elevation: 105 ft (32 m)

Population (2020)
  - Total: 14,983
  - Density: 3,577.8/sq mi (1,381.41/km^{2})
- Time zone: UTC−05:00 (Eastern Time Zone)
  - Summer (DST): UTC−04:00
- ZIP code: 11738
- Area codes: 631 and 934
- FIPS code: 36-25417
- GNIS feature ID: 0949921

Farmingville is a hamlet and census-designated place (CDP) in the town of Brookhaven, in Suffolk County, New York, United States. The population was 14,983 at the time of the 2020 census.

The community serves as the town seat of Brookhaven.

== History ==
The first settlement in what is now called Farmingville occurred in the late 18th century, and was called Bald Hills and Mooney Ponds, before it eventually was called Farmingville (though the soil and hills are not good for agriculture). The Keibel Family had a 72-acre fruit and vegetable farm from 1950 till 1982. It did not have its own post office until 1950.

The home of Elijah Terry, the first teacher in the local school, was built in 1823 and sits next to the Bald Hill Schoolhouse, built in 1850. The schoolhouse is in the National Register of Historic Places.

Bald Hill, one of the highest points on Long Island, is located on the Ronkonkoma Moraine, where the glacier which formed Long Island stopped its advance. At the top of Bald Hill is Vietnam Memorial Park, which includes an obelisk-shaped monument painted red, white, and blue, which was dedicated on November 11, 1991. The Bald Hill Cultural Center features the outdoor Catholic Health Amphitheater and was previously the location of a ski area from 1965 to 1980.

== Geography ==
According to the United States Census Bureau, the CDP has a total area of 4.19 square miles (10.9 km^{2}) – all of which is land.

== Demographics ==
Historical population
| Census | Pop. | Note | %± |
|---|---|---|---|
| 2000 | 16,458 | | — |
| 2010 | 15,481 | | −5.9% |
| 2020 | 14,983 | | −3.2% |
U.S. Decennial Census

=== 2020 census ===
As of the 2020 census, Farmingville had a population of 14,983. The median age was 40.1 years. 21.3% of residents were under the age of 18 and 14.3% of residents were 65 years of age or older. For every 100 females there were 97.3 males, and for every 100 females age 18 and over there were 95.5 males age 18 and over.

100.0% of residents lived in urban areas, while 0.0% lived in rural areas.

There were 4,706 households in Farmingville, of which 36.8% had children under the age of 18 living in them. Of all households, 60.4% were married-couple households, 14.3% were households with a male householder and no spouse or partner present, and 18.6% were households with a female householder and no spouse or partner present. About 14.6% of all households were made up of individuals and 6.0% had someone living alone who was 65 years of age or older.

There were 4,845 housing units, of which 2.9% were vacant. The homeowner vacancy rate was 0.8% and the rental vacancy rate was 3.0%.

Racial composition as of the 2020 census
| Race | Number | Percent |
|---|---|---|
| White | 11,149 | 74.4% |
| Black or African American | 552 | 3.7% |
| American Indian and Alaska Native | 42 | 0.3% |
| Asian | 716 | 4.8% |
| Native Hawaiian and Other Pacific Islander | 2 | 0.0% |
| Some other race | 871 | 5.8% |
| Two or more races | 1,651 | 11.0% |
| Hispanic or Latino (of any race) | 2,659 | 17.7% |

=== 2000 census ===
As of the 2000 census, there were 16,458 people, 5,041 households, and 4,229 families residing in the CDP. The population density was 3,642.8 inhabitants per square mile (1,406.5/km^{2}). There were 5,170 housing units at an average density of 1,144.3 per square mile (441.8/km^{2}). The racial makeup of the CDP was 79.9% White, 2.2% African American, 0.1% Native American, 3.7% Asian, 0.2% from other races, and 1.3% from two or more races. Hispanic or Latino of any race were 12.5% of the population.

There were 5,041 households, out of which 44.6% had children under the age of 18 living with them, 69.6% were married couples living together, 9.7% had a female householder with no husband present, and 16.1% were non-families. 11.8% of all households were made up of individuals, and 4.3% had someone living alone who was 65 years of age or older. The average household size was 3.26 and the average family size was 3.51.

In the CDP, the population was spread out, with 28.3% under the age of 18, 8.1% from 18 to 24, 34.3% from 25 to 44, 22.5% from 45 to 64, and 6.7% who were 65 years of age or older. The median age was 34 years. For every 100 females, there were 101.5 males. For every 100 females age 18 and over, there were 99.2 males.

The median income for a household in the CDP was $69,148, and the median income for a family was $72,750. Males had a median income of $50,075 versus $31,434 for females. The per capita income for the CDP was $23,755. About 2.1% of families and 3.0% of the population were below the poverty line, including 3.3% of those under age 18 and 3.9% of those age 65 or over.

== Arts and culture ==
The Bald Hill Cultural Center features the outdoor Catholic Health Amphitheater at Bald Hill. The community has a civic association involved in such activities as planting trees and plants.

== Government ==
Brookhaven Town Hall is located within Farmingville on the east side of Bald Hill; the community serves as Brookhaven's town seat.

== Education ==
The area is home to several public and private schools. The Sachem School District serves the residents of Farmingville, and Sachem High School East is located next to Brookhaven Town Hall on the east side of Bald Hill.

== Transportation ==
Farmingville is close to Long Island MacArthur Airport and the Long Island Rail Road's Ronkonkoma station – two of Long Island's major transportation hubs. The LIRR Medford station is also nearby. The hamlet is accessible from the Long Island Expressway via exit 63.

== Notable people ==
- Keith Kinkaid, ice hockey goaltender
- Jill Nicolini, reporter and former model, actress, and reality TV show participant
- Ryan DeRobertis, electronic musician better known as Saint Pepsi or Skylar Spence
