= Harbor Hill Moraine =

Landform on Long Island, New York, US

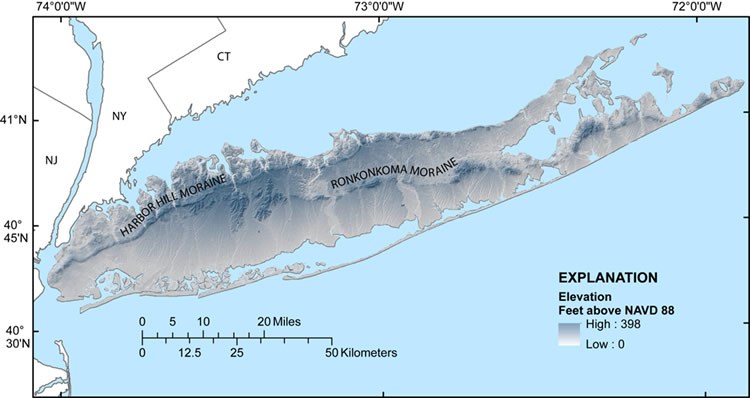
Map of Long Island topography and the generalized glacial moraine locations

The Harbor Hill Moraine, in the geography of Long Island, forms the northern of two ridges along the "backbone" of Long Island.

== Description ==
The Harbor Hill Moraine, skirting the North Shore, represents the terminal moraine of the most recent advance of the Wisconsinian glaciation, which reached its most southward advance about 18,000 years ago; the earlier Ronkonkoma Moraine, much cut through by outwash streams from the Harbor Hill Moraine, lies to the southeast. The Harbor Hill moraine is represented by the North Fork of eastern Long Island and in three disjunct sections farther east, Plum Island, Great Gull Island, and Fisher's Island. The western end is the Heights of Guwan in Brooklyn.

The Harbor Hill Moraine, named for its prominence at Harbor Hill, Roslyn, New York, the highest point in Nassau County, resulted from a lingering equilibrium stage in the glacier's episodic retreat, creating a stationary melting front; the Long Island area became permanently free of glacial ice in the range of 13,000 to 12,000 years ago.

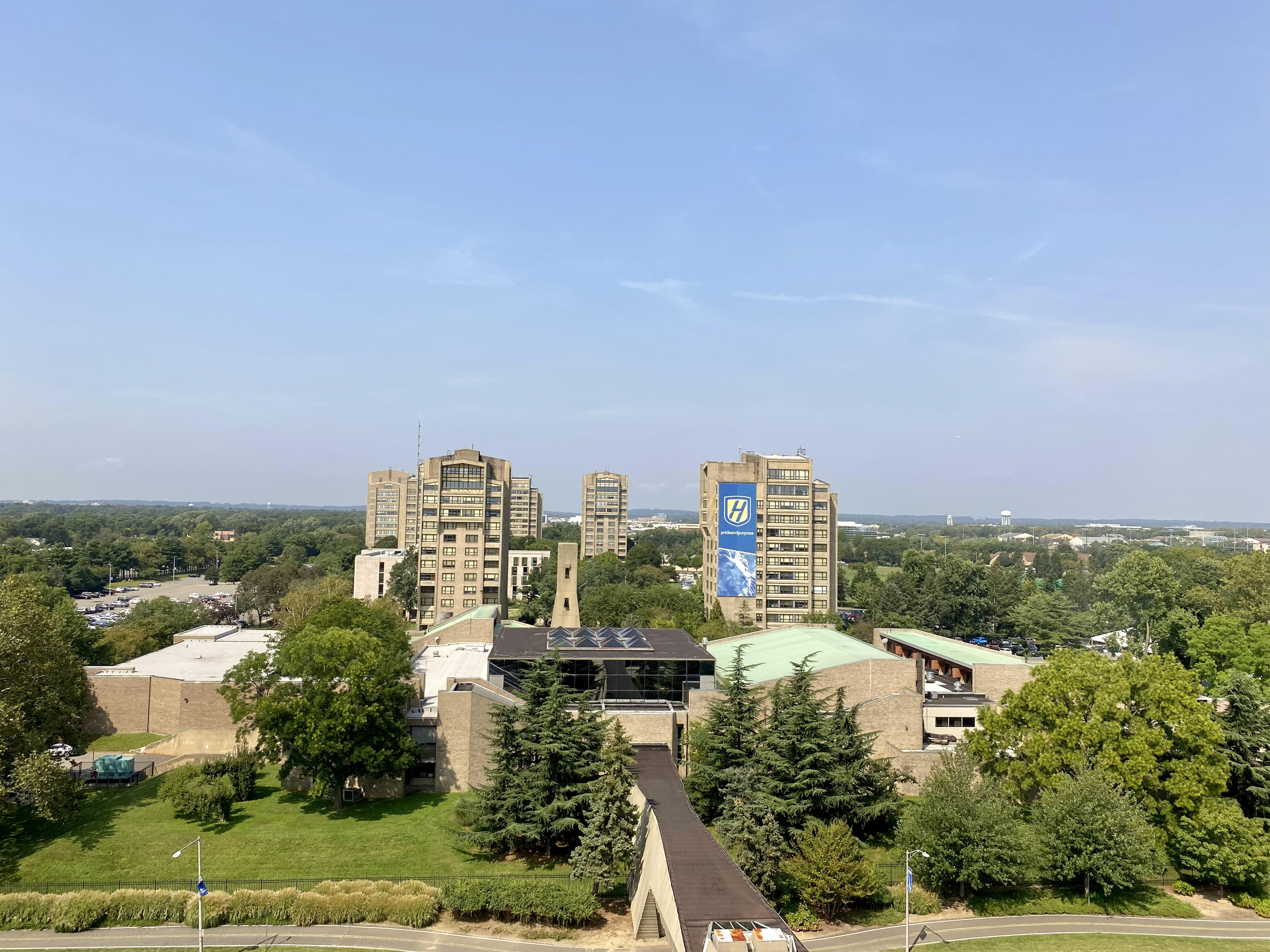
Harbor Hill and the Harbor Hill Moraine, seen from the Hofstra University Library in 2021. Harbor Hill is towards center-right.

The Harbor Hill Moraine intersects with the earlier Ronkonkoma Moraine at Lake Success. East of the lake, the two moraines may be seen, but west of Lake Success the Harbor Hill moraine overrode and effaced the Ronkonkoma moraine. South of the moraines is a broad outwash plain sloping towards the Atlantic Ocean, much of which has been submerged as ocean levels rose in the post-glacial period. The Harbor Hill Moraine forms the major drainage divide in Nassau County. Streams to the northwest of the moraine flow into Long Island Sound, whereas those to the south empty into the series of bays or sounds behind the barrier islands and so into the Atlantic.

== See also ==
- Ronkonkoma Moraine
- Terminal moraine
- List of glacial moraines
