= WGLI (New York) =

- Babylon, New York; United States
- Frequency: 1290 kHz

History
- First air date: September 1, 1958
- Last air date: 1989

Technical information
- Facility ID: 72112

WGLI (1290 AM) was a radio station licensed to Babylon, New York.

== History ==
Founded in 1958 by William Reuman the founder and owner of WWRL in New York City, the station went on the air on September 1, 1958, along with WGLI-FM. This made WGLI the first Long Island station to sign on both an AM & FM station on the same day.

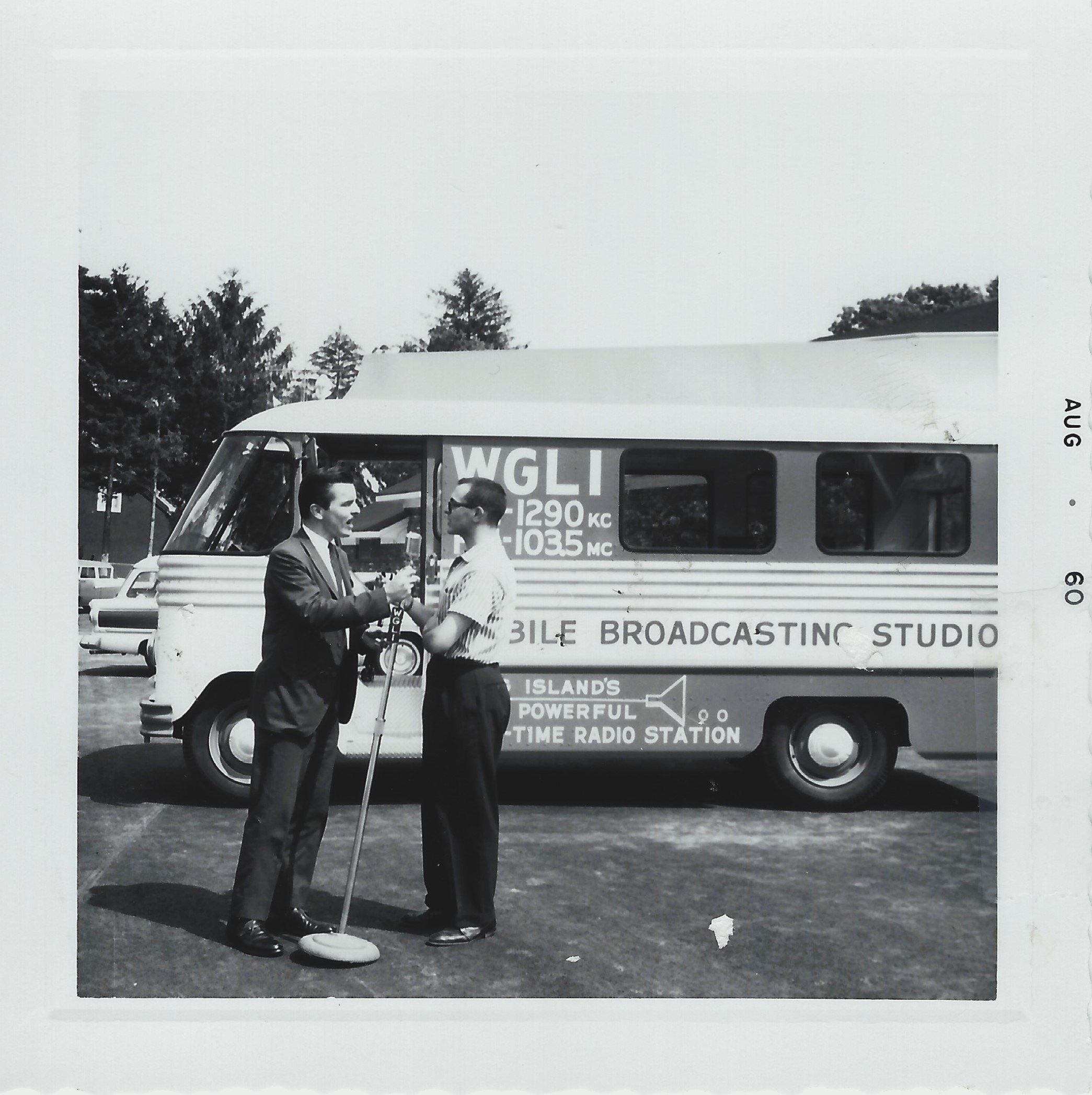
Alex Sullivan (left) doing mock interview

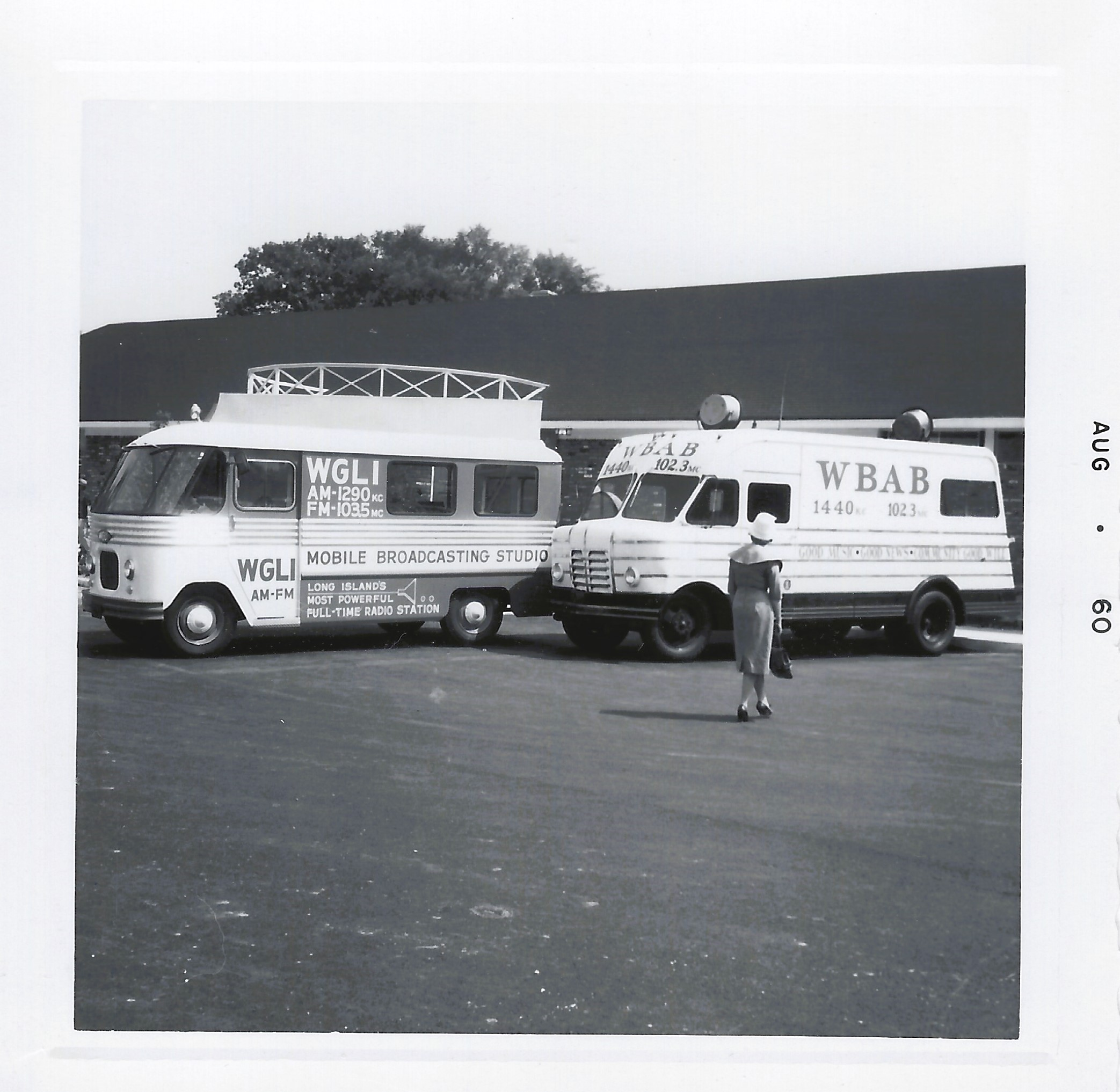
1960 Mobile Units

In March 1960, Friendly Frost Inc. (a Long Island-based appliance store chain) acquired WGLI Inc. from Mr. Reuman and his partners.

Originally broadcasting with 1,000 watts, the station increased power to 5,000 watts in 1966 after being sold to new owner Martin F. Beck. Beck, along with his brother-in-law George H. Ross created Beck-Ross Communications in order to purchase WGLI, the company eventually grew to own 10 stations, including WBLI in Patchogue, New York. Beck-Ross sold the station to Greater Long Island Communications in October 1978.

In 1988, it was purchased by WADO. The oldies format, which had been in place for some time, ended in August 1989. At first, WADO simulcast its signal on WGLI, but due to technical difficulties WGLI could no longer broadcast at its full power of 5,000 watts. As a result, WGLI was shut down so that WADO could expand their signal on AM 1280.

In 1990, the vacant radio facility was vandalized and a fire destroyed what was left of the building. Two of the three towers were still visible from Sunrise Highway in North Babylon for many years. An application was filed in 1996 to assign the call letters WZZU to the 1290 frequency, but was never granted. The license was cancelled in 1997.

== Notable alumni ==
- Robert Siegel — former host of All Things Considered on NPR, his first job in broadcasting was on WGLI where he used the pseudonym "Bob Charles"

== See also ==
- WKTU — formerly WGLI-FM, simulcast the AM on 103.5 FM
- WWSK — formerly WGLI-FM, simulcast the AM on 94.3 FM
