= WWSK =

Radio station in Smithtown, New York

- Smithtown, New York; United States
- Broadcast area: Long Island
- Frequency: 94.3 MHz
- Branding: 94.3 The Shark

Programming
- Language: English
- Format: Mainstream rock

Ownership
- Owner: Connoisseur Media; (Connoisseur Media Licenses, LLC)
- Sister stations: WALK-FM; WHLI; WKJY; WWWF-FM

History
- First air date: September 1, 1961
- Former call signs: WQMF (1961–1964); WGLI-FM (1964–1965); WGSM-FM (1965–1970); WCTO (1970–1990); WMJC (1990–2010); WIGX (2010–2012)
- Call sign meaning: "Shark"

Technical information
- Licensing authority: FCC
- Facility ID: 29260
- Class: A
- ERP: 2,600 watts
- HAAT: 96 meters (315 ft)
- Transmitter coordinates: 40°48′8.4″N 73°17′10.4″W
- Repeater: 97.5 WALK-FM HD2 (Patchogue)

Links
- Public license information: Public file; LMS
- Webcast: Listen live
- Website: www.943theshark.com

WWSK (94.3 FM) is a mainstream rock formatted radio station, licensed to Smithtown, New York, and owned by Connoisseur Media. The station's studios are located at Airport Plaza in Farmingdale, New York, and its transmitter is located in Brentwood, New York.

== History ==
What began as WQMF (1,000 watts; antenna 120 feet (37 m)) came about in September 1961 when WGLI-FM (103.5 FM) changed its community of license from Babylon to Lake Success. Owner Friendly Frost, a Long Island–based appliance store chain, applied for another FM frequency to replace 103.5 in the Babylon area and WQMF was born. Federal Communications Commission (FCC) rules prohibited ownership of overlapping signals, but because the new WGLI-FM antenna was located on a 175-foot (53 m) tower (20 kW) outside the studio building visible from the Long Island Expressway its new signal did not cover Babylon (this would become an issue a few years later).

WQMF was one of the first totally automated radio stations in the area and maybe the country. Its equipment package was named "Silent Sam" by engineers assigned to operate it as it played "beautiful music" from audio tapes supplied by a syndicator. The engineers' main function was tending to WQMF's sister station 1290 WGLI which required first class FCC licensed personnel because of its three tower directional antenna (1290 WGLI was shut down permanently in 1989).

In 1965, 103.5 FM, which had become WTFM, obtained a construction permit to move its transmitter to the Chrysler Building in Manhattan but big new coverage from a 950-foot (290 m) antenna (7.1 kW H 4.6 kW V) produced an overlapping signal with 94.3 FM, which had taken the WGLI-FM call sign. A quick sale sent WGLI-FM to Greater Media, a New Jersey–based group broadcaster, who had just acquired WGSM (740 AM) in Huntington. Greater Media paid just $90,000 ($919,483 in 2025 dollars) for the facility which was renamed WGSM-FM and began simulcasting WGSM (AM) with transmitter and antenna remaining at the WGLI complex.

=== Smithtown and soft sounds (1970–1990) ===
The arrangement continued until 1970 when the station moved its transmitter and antenna to a location in Brentwood where it remains to this day. As part of the move, WGSM-FM's COL changed from Babylon to Smithtown. After the move was completed 94.3 became WCTO ("WCTO Stereo") and began a twenty-year run playing easy listening music and earning top ratings which have never been duplicated by the many incarnations that would follow. (Example: 1975 ARB rating listeners 18-49 10A-3P M-F, WCTO was the number one LI radio station)

=== Magic, country, and rock (1990–2010) ===
In June 1990 a switch to a popular light AC format as WMJC ("Magic 94.3") under the guidance of Jack Kratoville (now at WLTW), then purchased by WRCN-FM radio in 1994 and simulcast the rock format from 1994 to 1996. After the rock experiment failed, it began to simulcast its sister station WGSM, which was carrying a country format at the time. WMJC eventually would adopt that format exclusively as "Country 94.3" when WGSM became Radio Disney. On November 10, 2000, the country format was dropped and WMJC became "Island 94-3" playing rock hits of the '80's and '90's with Charlie Lombardo (aka "Jay Letterman" from WALK-FM) as PD. By 2007, the branding changed to "94.3 WMJC", along with a music mix adjustment to Adult Top 40.

=== Gen X and The Shark (since 2010) ===
As mentioned, the station never achieved ratings anywhere near the high water mark set by WCTO and by mid 2010 was hovering in the 1 range. On October 19, 2010, came its sixth call sign change, from WMJC to WIGX, leading to rumors of a format change. Those rumors would prove true on November 5 when, at 4:30 pm, 94.3 began stunting with a montage of music, famous news, and TV snippets from each year from 1985 to 2005. At 5 pm, WIGX switched to a "Gen X hits" format, playing hit music from 1985 to 2005, as "94X". The first song on 94X was "Jump Around" by House of Pain. This version of 94.3 failed to achieve higher ratings and that brought about yet another change.

At Noon on September 14, 2012, after playing Semisonic's "Closing Time", the Star-Spangled Banner, and a brief clip from the trailer for Jaws, WIGX switched to mainstream rock, branded as "94.3 The Shark", launching with Nirvana's "Smells Like Teen Spirit". Soon after, WIGX switched to its seventh set of call letters, WWSK.
