= Jayne's Hill =

Highest point on Long Island

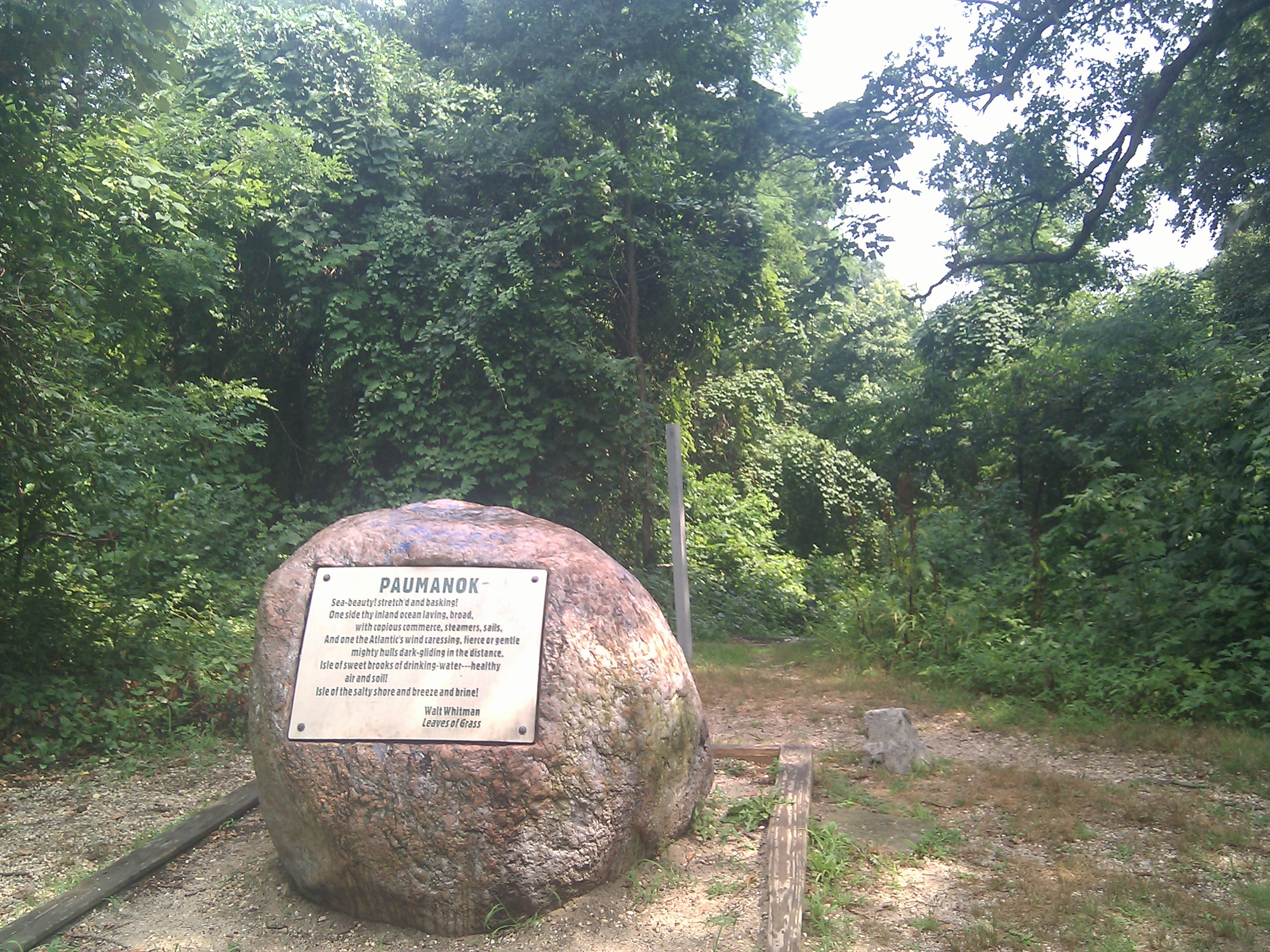
- Jayne's Hill with a plaque of Walt Whitman's "Paumanok" from Leaves of Grass in 2010

Highest point
- Elevation: 400.9 ft (122.2 m)
- Prominence: 400.9 ft (122.2 m)
- Listing: New York County High Points 57th
- Coordinates: 40°48′54″N 73°25′30″W

Geography
- Location within New York
- Location: West Hills, New York, U.S.
- Parent range: Wheatley Hills
- Topo map: USGS Huntington

Climbing
- Easiest route: road and trail

Jayne's Hill, also known as High Hill, West Hills, Oakley's Hill, and Janes Hill, is the highest point on Long Island, New York with an elevation of between 387 feet (118 m) and 400.9 feet (122.2 m) above sea level. It is situated on the Harbor Hill moraine, a terminal moraine that makes up the northern spine of Long Island, in West Hills County Park in Suffolk County, a little more than a mile to the north of Melville.

== Name and height ==
The United States Board on Geographic Names based on a 1903 ruling calls it "High Hill." On the Geographic Names Information System it is listed as 387 feet based on the National Elevation Dataset.

Suffolk County, which owns the peak, calls it Jayne's Hill and lists its elevation on its website as 400 feet. An interpretative sign in the park refers to it as "Jaynes Hill" (no apostrophe) and lists the height as 401 feet.

== History ==
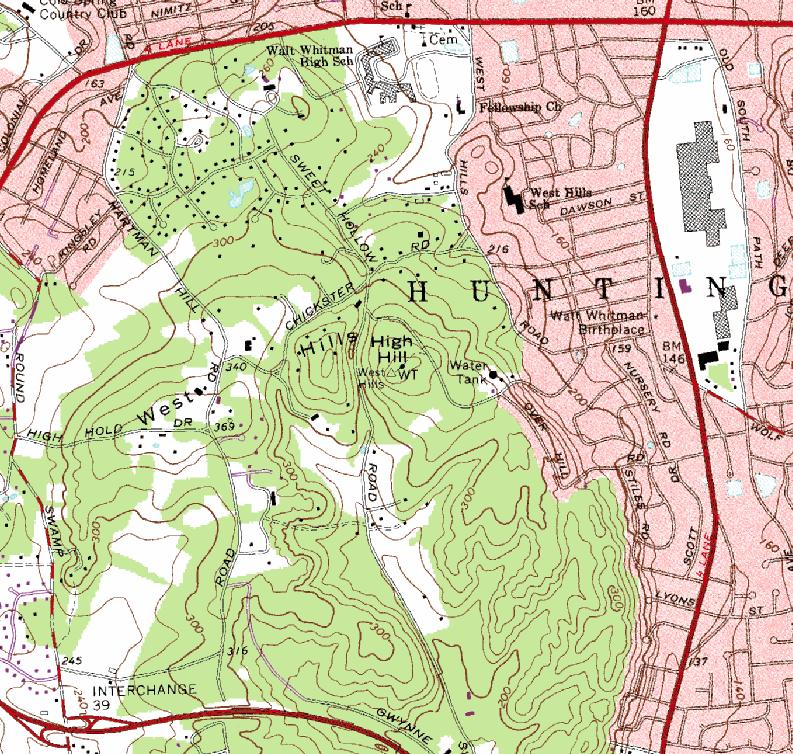
A 1979 United States Geological Survey map showing the location of "High Hill", also known as Jayne's Hill; the birthplace of American novelist Walt Whitman's lies due east of it.

Jayne's Hill has been known by several different names. In 1825, Long Island historian Silas Wood called it "Oakley's High Hill Field" with a surveyor telling him it was 354.5 feet (108.1 m). At the time it was considered the third highest point on Long Island behind Harbor Hill in Nassau County (reported then at 384 feet (117 m)) and Layton's Hill in Wheatley, New York (just south of the Long Island University C.W. Post Campus) reported then at 380 feet (120 m)).

Walt Whitman was born near the site of Jayne's Hill, and visited the summit. In 1881, Whitman wrote: "I write this back again at West Hills on a high elevation (the highest spot on Long Island?) Of Jayne's Hill. . . . A view of thirty of forty, or even fifty or more miles, especially to the east and south and southwest: the Atlantic Ocean to the latter points in the distance - a glimpse or so of Long Island Sound to the north."

In 1887, it was reported to be 383 feet (117 m) in the Brooklyn Daily Eagle, only one foot shy of the reported height of Harbor Hill. In 1901 the Brooklyn Daily Eagle reported that Jayne's Hill (named after its property owners) was the tallest.

Subsequent surveys by the United States Geological Survey of Harbor Hill show it to be 348 feet (106 m) and Layton's Hill as 325 feet (99 m).

The New York Times in 1980 reported that it was 428 feet (130 m).

In 1980, a plan to place a radio tower on top of Jayne's Hill as one of a series of police radio towers was foiled when environmentalists and residents physically blocked county bulldozers. Regardless, a water tower was erected in 1998. This in combination with forest growth overtaking the grasslands once present on the hill severely restrict the views once beheld by Whitman.

== Present day ==
As part of West Hills County Park, the summit is located on public land and lies along the white-blazed Walt Whitman trail. The closest parking is at the end of Reservoir Road in West Hills, New York near the private grounds of a county water tower. The park is open until dusk. Passing through two series of metal gates, one may reach the summit within a matter of minutes along the trail, with very little elevation to tackle along the way.

The summit is marked by a boulder bearing a plaque inscribed with Walt Whitman's poem "Paumanok" from Leaves of Grass. In 2010, some vandalization occurred at the area, resulting in missing wooden fences and signage and the boulder being marked with spray paint.
