= WHLI =

Radio station in Hempstead, New York

- Hempstead, New York; United States
- Broadcast area: Long Island
- Frequency: 1100 kHz
- Branding: The New 104.7 WHLI

Programming
- Language: English
- Format: Oldies

Ownership
- Owner: Connoisseur Media; (Connoisseur Media Licenses, LLC)
- Sister stations: WALK-FM; WKJY; WWSK; WWWF-FM

History
- First air date: July 15, 1947
- Call sign meaning: Hempstead Long Island

Technical information
- Licensing authority: FCC
- Facility ID: 38337
- Class: D
- Power: 10,000 watts (daytime only)
- Transmitter coordinates: 40°41′6.4″N 73°36′34.5″W
- Translator: 104.7 W284DG (Hempstead)

Links
- Public license information: Public file; LMS
- Website: www.whli.com

WHLI (1100 AM) is a commercial radio station licensed to Hempstead, New York, and serving Long Island. It is owned by Connoisseur Media and has an oldies radio format made up of hits from the 60s and 70s.

The station's studios and offices are located at Airport Plaza in Farmingdale, New York, and its transmitter is located off the Southern State Parkway at Milburn Avenue in Hempstead. WHLI broadcasts on 1100 AM, a clear channel frequency reserved for Class A WTAM in Cleveland. Because radio waves travel farther at night, WHLI must sign–off the air at sunset to protect WTAM.

== History ==
=== Early years ===
WHLI first signed on the air on July 15, 1947, along with FM sister station WHNY, licensed to Paul and Elias Godofsky, the owners of WLIB in New York City from 1942 to 1944.

The station began broadcasting with a 250-watt non-directional signal, only heard in and around Nassau County, New York. In 1960, the Federal Communications Commission (FCC) gave permission for WHLI to raise its power to the current 10,000 watts, using a two-tower directional signal. The WHLI towers are located next to the Southern State Parkway in Hempstead, near the Baldwin Road/Grand Avenue exit. They are a popular landmark as signage touting the WHLI call letters and frequency have been mounted on the main tower for decades for passing motorists to see. The historic signs were removed temporarily from WHLI Tower No. 2 on Friday, August 13, 2010, to allow for minor repairs and upgrades to the transmission facilities.

According to the book The Airwaves Of New York', programming on WHLI in 1947 included dinner music from the syndicated program "Candlelight and Silver." The station "looked to the local audience for talent and encouraged amateurs and professionals to audition, welcoming everyone from classical musicians to pop singers and comedians."

From the first day, WHLI aimed to an upscale audience. As "The Voice Of Long Island", the station became the dominant local station in Nassau County with a decent signal into Suffolk and Queens Counties. By the early 1950s, WHLI's "Commuter's Time" was the top-rated morning show. The rest of the broadcast day was filled with "familiar good music and local news." The station aired concerts from "The Long Island Pops" and hours of "Music From The Country Club".

=== Music of Your life ===
In the 1960s and 70s, WHLI played Top 40 hits. Some New York City disc jockeys got their start on WHLI.

But on January 21, 1979, it made a major change. WHLI flipped to a new radio format known as "The Music of Your Life." The service was started by veteran broadcaster Al Ham and became popular in a large number of cities around the U.S.

WHLI played adult standards with local news from its own staff as well as national news from CNN at the beginning of each hour. The station featured easy listening vocal artists such as Frank Sinatra, Tony Bennett, Nat King Cole, Barbra Streisand and Dean Martin. It mixed in a moderate amount of Big Band music from the 1930s and '40s from Tommy Dorsey, Artie Shaw, Benny Goodman and Glenn Miller. Also heard were handful of baby boomer popular artists like Ray Charles, Bobby Vinton, Connie Francis, Dionne Warwick and The Platters.

By the late 1980s more softer artists from the Top 40 were heard, including Neil Diamond, Anne Murray, Stevie Wonder, Barry Manilow, Simon & Garfunkel, Kenny Rogers, The Beatles, The 5th Dimension and The Carpenters. In the early 1990s, a small amount of pre-1965 oldies began to be mixed in. Big Bands were cut back to one an hour.

=== Soft oldies ===
By 2005, the station had more of a soft oldies sound but a third of the music was by standards artists, though big bands were dropped altogether. Younger artists working with the "Great American Songbook" were included, such as Natalie Cole, Diana Krall, Rod Stewart and Michael Bublé. Around 2015, the station modified to more of an oldies format playing one or two standards an hour at most. WHLI picked up Westwood One News for its world and national coverage. In 2019, WHLI dropped all remaining standards artists and became an all-oldies station. Top 40 hits from the 1950s, 60s, 70s and 80s made up the music format.

In September 2014, WHLI added a simulcast in Suffolk County on AM 1370 WALK, which Connoisseur had just acquired from Clear Channel Communications (through its Aloha Station Trust). The simulcast ended after WALK was donated to Cantico Nuevo Ministry in late 2019, subsequently becoming WLID.

== Studios ==
WHLI's first offices and studios were in a frame house at 245 Baldwin Road in Hempstead. In 1957 the station moved to a two-story facility constructed for them at 384 Clinton Street in Hempstead. The station moved to the third floor of 1055 Franklin Avenue in neighboring Garden City, New York in 1991. In 2001 Barnstable consolidated operations for WHLI, WKJY, WBZO, and WMJC into a newly designed and constructed- management, sales, promotions and technical operations center at 234 Airport Plaza in Farmingdale. This consolidation makes it the largest, privately owned, radio broadcast facility in New York.

September 24, 2014, overnight: WHLI 1100 & WALK 1370's simulcast studio relocated to a new custom-designed studio within the Airport Plaza broadcast complex to what was "Production A" the home of numerous interview programs and a satellite studio for the WBZO morning drive time show.

== Ownership ==
WHLI and its FM counterpart were run by the Godofskys until February 1979, when they were sold to Williams Broadcasting Corporation for $1.5 million. They were sold again in 1984 to Barnstable Broadcasting, this time for $5 million. Effective July 3, 2012, WHLI (along with WBZO, WIGX and WKJY) was sold to Connoisseur Media, LLC, for $23 million.
