= Ronkonkoma Moraine =

Moraine in Long Island, New York, U.S.

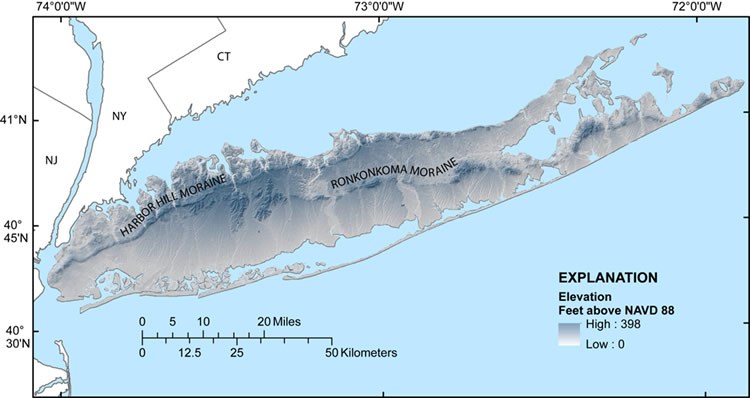
A map showing Long Island's topography and the generalized locations of the glacial moraines.

The Ronkonkoma Moraine, in the geography of Long Island, forms the southern of two ridges along Long Island's "backbone."

== Description ==
The Ronkonkoma Moraine, a terminal moraine, was formed 21,000 to 22,000 years ago during the Wisconsin Glacial Episode. It predates the Harbor Hill Moraine - which cuts through the Ronkonkoma Moraine's western portions - by 3,000 years.

The Ronkonkoma Moraine and the Harbor Hill Moraine intersect at Lake Success in western Nassau County. Today, the moraine is most prominent in Suffolk County, where it traverses the center of Long Island and forms the South Fork.

== Notable summits ==
- Bald Hill – 331 ft (101 m)
- Telescope Hill – 334 feet (102 m)

== See also ==
- Terminal moraine
- List of glacial moraines
