= WLIR-FM =

Talk radio station in Hampton Bays, New York

Semi-satellite of WABC, New York City
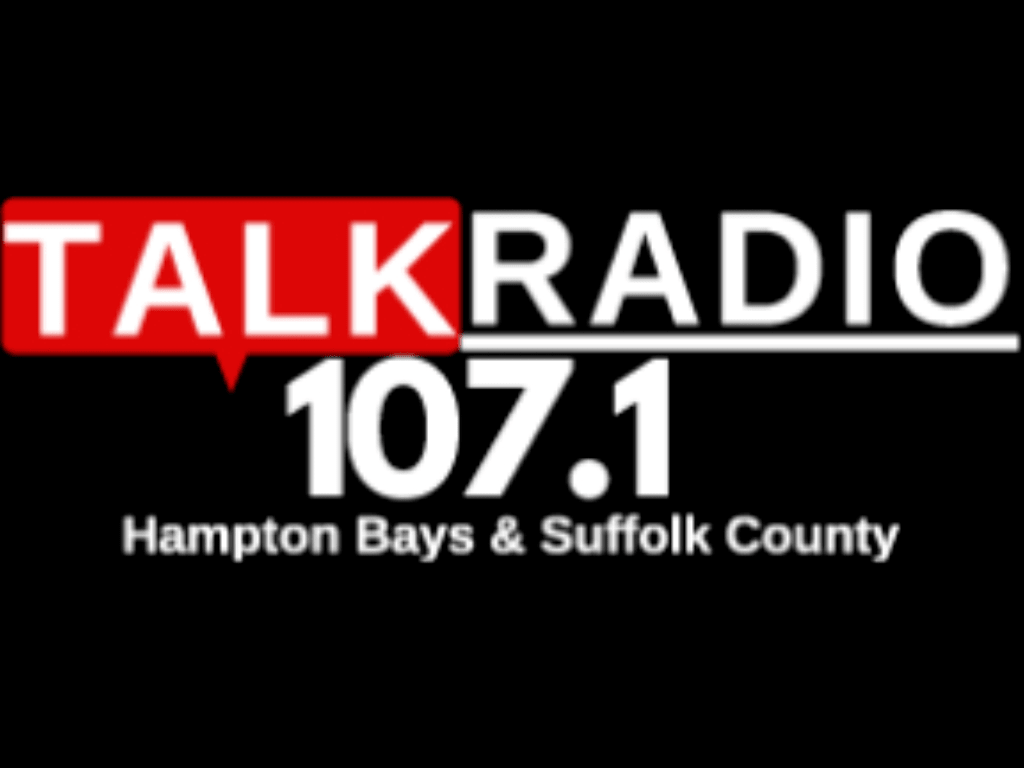
- Hampton Bays, New York; United States
- Broadcast area: Eastern Long Island
- Frequency: 107.1 MHz
- Branding: Talkradio 107.1

Programming
- Language: English
- Format: Conservative talk radio
- Affiliations: Fox News Radio; Westwood One

Ownership
- Owner: Red Apple Media; (Red Apple Media, Inc.)
- Sister stations: WABC; WLID; WRCR

History
- First air date: November 14, 1980
- Former call signs: WWHB (1980–1997); WWVY (1997–1999); WWXY (1999–2003); WBON (2003–2004)
- Call sign meaning: Carried over from the former WLIR (92.7 FM), now WFME-FM

Technical information
- Licensing authority: FCC
- Facility ID: 61089
- Class: A
- ERP: 4,100 watts
- HAAT: 121 meters (397 ft)
- Transmitter coordinates: 40°53′07.8″N 72°41′33.0″W
- Repeater: (1370 kHz) WLID (Patchogue)

Links
- Public license information: Public file; LMS
- Website: wabcradio.com

WLIR-FM (107.1 FM, "Talkradio 107.1") is a radio station licensed to serve Hampton Bays, New York. The station's studios and offices are located on Third Avenue in Midtown Manhattan, and transmitting facilities are located in Northampton in Suffolk County. The station is owned by businessman John Catsimatidis through his Red Apple Media company.

== History ==
The station went on the air on November 14, 1980, as WWHB under the moniker "The New 107 FM WWHB", with an adult contemporary music format. In 1984, Eddie Simon along with his brother, singer Paul Simon, purchased the station. Its format then shifted to a Top 40/CHR format as "Laser Hot HB107". On September 1, 1990, WWHB began simulcasting AOR station WNEW-FM from New York City.

=== Country and Spanish quadcasts (1996–2003) ===
On December 7, 1996, the station became part of the Big City Radio trimulcast (and eventual quadcast) with other 107.1 stations in Briarcliff Manor, New York and northern New Jersey and later, the Lehigh Valley/Allentown, Pennsylvania area. WWHB and the other two multicast stations switched formats to country as "Y-107". The call sign was changed to WWVY on May 16, 1997, then to WWXY on March 22, 1999 (after 107.1 FM in Briarcliff Manor, New York changed from WWXY to WYNY). On May 9, 2002, after a day of stunting with construction noises, the quadcast adopted a Tropical music format branded "Rumba 107". The format was ill-suited to the quadcast suburban signals, and at the end of the year, Big City Radio filed for bankruptcy and sold the stations to Nassau Broadcasting, which broke up the quadcast and sold the individual stations.

=== Modern rock, ESPN, and Christian (2003–2011) ===
Jarad Broadcasting picked up WWXY in April 2003. 107.1 FM initially simulcasted WLIR (92.7 FM) from Garden City, New York. In January 2004, 92.7 FM was purchased by Univision and flipped to Spanish language "Latino Mix" WZAA, simulcasting WCAA. 107.1 FM then became a fully transplanted WLIR, taking on a modern rock format and the WLIR-FM call sign, turning into "THE BOX". This format lasted until September 2005, when a smooth jazz/chill music format called "NeoBreeze" was adopted. This format was a failure, and the modern rock format returned in December 2005. In January 2008, the music ended and WLIR began simulcasting WEPN (ESPN Radio, 1050 AM) in a local marketing agreement. WLIR was sold to Livingstone in 2011 and flipped to a Christian format branded as "Hope Radio".

=== Christian and sports flips (2011–2017) ===
On August 5, 2013, Livingstone Broadcasting shifted the "Hope Radio" Christian format to WBLI-HD2 along with translators 94.9 W235BB Hauppauge, New York; 96.5 W243BF Shirley, New York; 101.5 W268AN Plainview, New York and 104.5 W283BA Selden, New York. WLIR-FM dropped the Christian format and became "Champions Radio" touted as "Long Island's First & Only Sports Radio Station". WLIR-FM was broadcast on 107.1 and 96.9 W245BA in Suffolk County, New York. The format was short lived.

On February 24, 2014, WLIR-FM dropped all sports programming and reverted to Christian formatted "Hope Radio".

On August 1, 2014, Pillar of Fire began a lease of WLIR-FM. WAWZ-FM, Zarephath, New Jersey (STAR 99.1) was broadcast on WLIR-FM as well as its translators as "STAR 107.1". The lease ended in April 2015 and WLIR-FM reverted to Christian formatted "Hope Radio".

On July 1, 2017, the station was sold to VMT Media Inc. and continued to air the "Hope Radio" format.

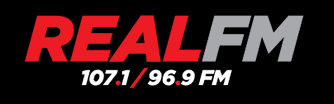
Logo as Real-FM.

=== Real-FM (2018–2020) ===
On January 1, 2018, the station dropped "Hope Radio" and began broadcasting an unbranded mix of oldies and classic rock music as a transitional format, simulcasting on 96.9 W245BA. On April 20, 2018, the station officially re-launched as classic hits "Real-FM".

=== WABC simulcast (2020–present) ===
On July 1, 2020, Red Apple Media – owner of WABC in New York City – began operating the station through a local marketing agreement, and converted it to a near-simulcast of WABC's talk programming. An exception to the simulcast was a local morning program hosted by Frank Morano, which replaced Brian Kilmeade (as it was already cleared by competitor WRCN-FM). A week later, Red Apple Media announced its intent to acquire the station outright, and that Morano would also join WABC's main lineup on weekday overnights and Sunday nights. Currently newscasts and traffic reports are provided by Red Apple Media's Lisa Ritchie, who also provides traffic reports and produces news for WABC/World Wide News Network.
