= WRCR =

Simulcast with WABC, New York
- Haverstraw, New York; United States
- Broadcast area: Rockland County, New York
- Frequency: 1700 kHz
- Branding: Talkradio 77 WABC

Programming
- Language: English
- Format: Conservative talk radio
- Affiliations: Fox News Radio; NBC News Radio; Salem Radio Network; Westwood One; WNYW

Ownership
- Owner: Alexander Broadcasting, Inc.; (sale to Red Apple Media pending)
- Operator: Red Apple Media
- Sister stations: WABC; WLID; WLIR-FM

History
- First air date: September 1, 1965
- Former call signs: WRRC (1965–1968); WKQW (1968–1977); WGRC (1977–1987); WLIR (1987–2000)
- Former frequencies: 1300 kHz (1965–2015)
- Call sign meaning: Rockland County Radio

Technical information
- Licensing authority: FCC
- Facility ID: 64556
- Class: B
- Power: 10,000 watts (day); 1,000 watts (night)
- Transmitter coordinates: 41°11′22.3″N 74°00′53.5″W

Links
- Public license information: Public file; LMS

WRCR (1700 kHz) is a commercial AM radio station licensed to serve Haverstraw, New York. WRCR simulcasts WABC's conservative talk radio format. The station is owned by Alexander Broadcasting, Inc., but is in the process of being sold to WABC owner Red Apple Media. Its studios and offices are at 144 Ramapo Road in Garnerville.

By day, WRCR is powered at 10,000 watts non-directional. To avoid interference with other stations at night, it reduces power to 1,000 watts at sunset. The station's transmitter site is at South Mountain Park in Haverstraw.

== History ==
=== Early years ===
The station signed on the air on September 1, 1965. The original call sign was WRRC, and later WKQW and WGRC. It had several different owners and formats including soft oldies and adult standards as a "Music of Your Life" station.

It was a daytime-only station, on 1300 kHz in Spring Valley, New York, with studios at the Broadcast House on Route 59. The station used its original transmitter site in Nanuet, New York, for 52 years, although a new tower was erected in 2015 for the operation at 1700 AM.

The station used the call letters WLIR from late 1987 until 2000. WLIR had been the call sign for a popular modern rock FM station operating at 92.7 MHz on Long Island. When that station lost its FCC license, management brought the WLIR call sign to this co-owned Rockland County station. In 2000, WLIR changed its call sign to WRCR.

=== Move to 1700 AM ===
On March 17, 1997, the Federal Communications Commission (FCC) announced that 88 stations had been given permission to move to newly available "Expanded Band" transmitting frequencies, ranging from 1610 to 1700 kHz. One of the authorizations was for WZNN in Rochester, New Hampshire, to move from 930 to 1700 kHz. However, the 1700 AM operation in New Hampshire was never built, and its construction permit was cancelled on December 22, 2000.

The abandonment of the New Hampshire assignment left 1700 AM unoccupied by any stations in the northeastern United States. The FCC normally did not allow additional stations to apply for operation on an expanded band frequency. However, in 2006 the commission granted a request for WRCR to move from 1300 to 1700 kHz, stating that a "waiver is warranted to permit the licensing of a station that could provide full-time local emergency radio service to Rockland County residents who would be at great risk in the event of a radiological emergency at the Indian Point facility".

On July 13, 2015, WRCR moved from 1300 to 1700 kHz, increasing its power from 500 to 10,000 watts by day and adding night service at 1,000 watts. The higher power allowed the station to be heard over a wider area of the lower Hudson Valley and Northern New Jersey. Along with the facility upgrade, the station's city of license was changed from Spring Valley to Ramapo. Both are communities in Rockland County.

On August 7, 2017, management announced via the station's website that WRCR would be forced to go silent for an unknown amount of time. The station would be off-the-air on its 1700 kHz frequency until further notice due to an emergency relocation of the transmitter and tower equipment. On August 29, 2017, Alexander Broadcasting Inc. filed a "Notice of Suspension of Operations" with the FCC.

The station sought consent to go silent on the 1700 kHz frequency. It stated that the owner of the land where WRCR's transmitter and tower were located had opted not to renew the station's lease. The landlord had the electrical power and other vital utilities to the property shut off without notifying the station. In the notice on the station's website, management stated that WRCR would continue to broadcast via live streaming on the website and also via the TuneIn app and Amazon Echo devices.

The station resumed radio broadcasting on April 27, 2019. It began using a new transmitter site in South Mountain Park in the town of Haverstraw, New York. The station was authorized to move its community of license to Haverstraw, effective October 21, 2021.

=== Acquisition by Red Apple Media ===
In May 2025, the station began to simulcast WABC's conservative talk format. WABC's parent company Red Apple Media subsequently revealed that it had agreed to acquire WRCR for an undisclosed amount. It stated that the WABC simulcast would be an interim format, and that WRCR planned to reintroduce local programming in the future.
