= WLID =

Simulcast with WLIR-FM, Hampton Bays
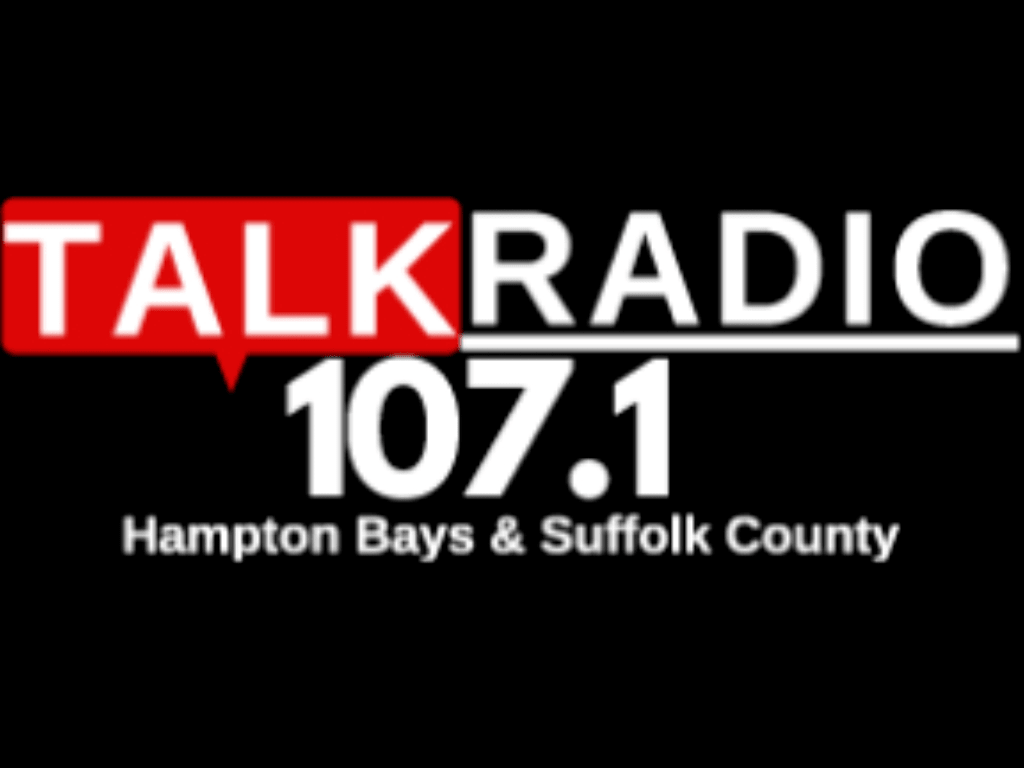
- Patchogue, New York; United States
- Broadcast area: Suffolk County, New York
- Frequency: 1370 kHz
- Branding: Talkradio 107.1

Programming
- Language: English
- Format: Conservative talk radio
- Affiliations: Fox News Radio; Westwood One

Ownership
- Owner: John Catsimatidis; (Red Apple Media, Inc.)
- Sister stations: WABC; WLIR-FM; WRCR

History
- First air date: April 20, 1952
- Former call signs: WALK (1952–2019)

Technical information
- Licensing authority: FCC
- Facility ID: 10136
- Class: D
- Power: 500 watts (day); 102 watts (night)
- Transmitter coordinates: 40°45′16.4″N 72°59′7.4″W
- Translators: 95.7 W239CY (Patchogue); 107.1 W296EK (Brentwood)

Links
- Public license information: Public file; LMS
- Website: wabcradio.com

WLID (1370 kHz) is a commercial AM radio station licensed to serve Patchogue, New York. Established in 1952 as WALK, the station is owned by businessman John Catsimatidis through his Red Apple Media company.

WLID broadcasts at 500 watts by day. At sunset, the station reduces power to 102 watts to protect other stations on 1370 AM from interference. WLID's transmitter is located at the former WALK studios on Colonial Drive in East Patchogue, New York. Programming is also heard on FM translators W239CY at 95.7 MHz, and W296EK at 107.1 MHz.

== History ==
=== Early years ===
The station, initially owned by the Suffolk Broadcasting Corporation, signed on the air on April 20, 1952. The original call sign was WALK, broadcasting from studios on Colonial Drive in East Patchogue. The station's studios would remain there for more than 62 years. For most of those years, the station was a daytimer, required to go off the air at night. It added an FM sister station only seven months later.

In its early years, WALK played classical music, big bands and jazz. It was purchased in 1963 by the Island Broadcasting System along with its sister stations, WALK-FM and WRIV in Riverhead. Island Broadcasting was owned in part by NBC News anchorman Chet Huntley. WALK was one of the first stations on Long Island to run a full schedule of Christmas music for several weeks during the holiday season. The holiday format began in 1995. In later years, it was run on both WALK and WALK-FM as the two stations simulcast.

=== Changes in ownership ===
On May 15, 2014, Qantum Communications announced that it would acquire WALK and WALK-FM from the Aloha Station Trust in exchange for transferring its existing 29 stations to the WALK stations' former owner, Clear Channel Communications (now iHeartMedia). Qantum then immediately resold the WALK stations to Connoisseur Media. On September 12, 2014, WALK flipped to a simulcast of co-owned 1100 WHLI's adult standards format.

On October 30, 2019, it was announced that Connoisseur Media would be donating WALK's license to Cantico Nuevo Ministry, the owner of WNYG in Patchogue and WLIM in Medford. As part of the deal, Iglesias de Evangelizacion Misionera Jovenus Cristianos de EU Inc. purchased WALK's transmitter site and former studios for $500,000. The deal was consummated on December 31, 2019. Connoisseur retained the rights to the WALK call sign for 97.5 FM, which prompted 1370's call letters to be changed to WLID.

On November 26, 2025, it was reported that Red Apple Media would be purchasing WLID from Cantico Nuevo Ministry for $500,000. The deal closed in February 2026.
