= WDRE =

WDRE may refer to:

== Radio stations ==
- WDRE (AM), a radio station (1570 AM) currently licensed to Riverhead, New York, United States

== Former radio stations ==
- WVIP, a radio station (100.5 FM) licensed to Susquehanna, Pennsylvania, United States, which used the WDRE call sign from 2013 to 2025
- WPTY, a radio station (105.3 FM) licensed to Calverton-Roanoke, New York, United States, which used the WDRE call sign from 2004 to 2009
- WBZO, a radio station (98.5 FM) licensed to Westhampton, New York, United States, which used the WDRE call sign from 1997 to 2004
- WPHI-FM, a radio station (103.9 FM) licensed to Jenkintown, Pennsylvania, United States, which used the WDRE call sign from 1996 to 1997
- WFME-FM, a radio station (92.7 FM) licensed to Garden City, New York, United States, which used the WDRE call sign from 1987 to 1996
- WRWB-FM, a radio station (99.3 FM) licensed to Ellenville, New York, United States, which used the WDRE call sign from 1981 to 1984

== Other meanings ==
- Western Desert Railway Extension, a railway in North Africa during the Second World War
