= WCNM =

- Hazlet, New Jersey; United States
- Broadcast area: Monmouth County, New Jersey
- Frequency: 103.9 MHz
- Branding: 'Radio Cantico Nuevo'

Programming
- Language: Spanish language
- Format: Christian radio

Ownership
- Owner: Cantico Nuevo Ministry, Inc.

History
- First air date: May 24, 1979; 46 years ago (as WVRM on 89.3 FM)
- Former call signs: WVRM (1979–1987); WCNJ (1987–2005); WDDM (2005–2012); WPDI (2012–2019)
- Former frequencies: 89.3 MHz (1979–2012); 104.7 MHz (2012–2013)

Technical information
- Licensing authority: FCC
- Facility ID: 70644
- Class: D
- ERP: 10 watts
- HAAT: 87 meters (285 ft)
- Transmitter coordinates: 40°25′37.00″N 74°11′40.00″W

Links
- Public license information: Public file; LMS
- Website: Radio Cantico Nuevo

WCNM (103.9 FM, "Radio Cantico Nuevo") is a radio station licensed to Hazlet, New Jersey, broadcasting a Spanish language Christian radio format. The station is currently owned by Cantico Nuevo Ministry, Inc. and serves the Monmouth County, New Jersey area.

On July 27, 2015, WVRM, Inc. filed an assignment of license application with the Federal Communications Commission for a transfer of license to Cantico Nuevo Ministry, Inc. the owner of Radio Cantico Nuevo. The sale, at a purchase price of $130,000, was consummated on November 25, 2015.

== See also ==
Radio Cantico Nuevo is also heard on these stations.

- WNYG licensed to Patchogue, New York
- WJDM licensed to Mineola, New York
