= Ultra Mix =

Ultra Mix may refer to:

- Ultra-mix Universal Automation System 1995 Mackie audio mixing system for 8-bus consoles
- Ultra Mix (Priority Records series), dance compilation by Universal Music from 1997
- UltraMix (Ultra Records album series), Ultra Records series, dance compilation from 2010s, now part of Sony Entertainment
- Ultra.Mix - Vic Latino (September 23, 2008)
- Ultramix 2 - Vic Latino (September 22, 2009)
- UltraMix 3 - (March 6, 2010)
- Ultra Mix (Shonen Knife album)
