= WBON =

WBON may refer to:

- WBON (FM), a radio station (92.1 FM) licensed to Destin, Florida, United States
- WBON-LD, a low-power television station (channel 9) licensed to serve Richmond, Kentucky, United States
- WBZO (FM), a radio station (98.5 FM) licensed to Westhampton, New York, which held the call sign WBON from 2004 to 2025
- WLIR-FM, a radio station (107.1 FM) licensed to Hampton Bays, New York, which held the call sign WBON from 2003 to 2004
- WKHT, a radio station (104.5 FM) licensed to Knoxville, Tennessee, which held the call sign WBON from 2000 to 2003
- WVCY-FM, a radio station (107.7 FM) licensed to Milwaukee, Wisconsin, which held the call sign WBON from 1964 to 1973
