= WYOO =

Coordinates: 30.179°N 85.782°W

- Springfield, Florida; United States
- Broadcast area: Panama City, Florida
- Frequency: 101.1 MHz
- Branding: Florida Man Radio

Programming
- Format: Talk

Ownership
- Owner: JVC Broadcasting
- Sister stations: WILN, WWLY, WYYX

History
- First air date: December 1, 1993
- Former frequencies: 101.3 MHz (1993–1996)

Technical information
- Licensing authority: FCC
- Facility ID: 67074
- Class: C3
- ERP: 12,000 watts
- HAAT: 123.1 meters (404 ft)

Links
- Public license information: Public file; LMS
- Webcast: Listen Online
- Website: www.floridamanradio.com

WYOO (101.1 FM, "Florida Man Radio") is a commercial radio station located in Springfield, Florida, broadcasting to the Panama City, Florida, area. WYOO airs talk radio programming.

== History ==
WYOO began broadcasting on December 1, 1993 on 101.3 MHz as an extension of WLTG, and was branded as WLTG-FM.

Styles Media (now Magic Broadcasting) purchased WYOO in 1996, and the station was moved to 101.1 MHz in December of that year. At the time of its purchase, the station was operating in a small room on the second floor of the Nationwide Fitness Building in Panama City. The station was moved into a building on 23rd Street which also housed two other radio stations.

Talk Radio operated at low power, with its signal being carried in mono by a telephone line. The station's sales personnel had to work out of their vehicles as there was no office.

Styles Media applied to the Federal Communications Commission (FCC) and received approval to upgrade the signal. WYOO bought a new transmitter, built a new tower and studio and added new programming.

In August 1998, a live morning show was put on the air, and the station carried a live simulcast of Channel 7 at that time from 5 to 5:30 pm. Talk Radio 101 was nominated for Talk Station of the Year that year and also had record ratings and revenue.

In February 2000, the radio station was sold to NextMedia, a company from Colorado. Under the branding of "101.1 FM/The Buzz", the format was changed from a conservative one to a "liberal/hot" talk format. Shows like Liz Wilde, Tom Leykis, and Bob and Sherri were brought in, and the conservative shows that Styles Media had were cancelled. The ratings plummeted.

Seeking to revamp the schedule, NextMedia hired a new program director and morning show host, Doc Washburn. Under his direction, G. Gordon Liddy's program was replaced with Mike Gallagher's, and Clark Howard and Sean Hannity replaced Dr. Laura Schlesinger in the lineup. Michael Savage had already been put on WYOO when Washburn took over. Washburn was eventually able add Neal Boortz to the lineup.

In June 2002, NextMedia offered to sell WYOO and its sister stations back to Styles Media. In April 2003, Styles Media management switched the first two hours of the Clark Howard show for Bill O'Reilly. In December 2003, they replaced Mike Gallagher with Glenn Beck. In September 2004, during a period of high ratings for the station, morning show host Doc Washburn disappeared from the airwaves after spending 3½ years developing an audience.

Eventually, long-time DJ Rob Stark took over the morning show. Stark lasted 7½ months and was replaced by "The Attack Machine" from Gainesville, FL. Stark would later host the morning show of country station WAKT (Kat Kountry) across town. In December 2006, the Attack Machine moved their show to Birmingham at WYDE.

The WYOO call sign has previously been used for an AM/FM simulcast called "U100" that existed from 1974 to 1976 in Minneapolis-St. Paul.

In June 2025, JVC Broadcasting announced its intent to acquire most of Magic Broadcasting's Panama City stations, including WYOO.

In July 2025, JVC announced that it would flip WYOO to its hot talk "Florida Man Radio" network (originating on WZLB) on August 4, switching to a lineup featuring Bubba the Love Sponge, Markley Van Camp and Robbins, and Shannon Burke. WYOO's current morning host Brian Rust will also join the network as a morning host.

== On-air hosts ==
During the station's last years as News Talk 100.1, notable programming included Clyde Lewis, Mark Levin, Rick and Bubba, Alex Jones, Sean Hannity, Michael Savage, and George Noory.

Notable former programming included Imus in the Morning, Rush Limbaugh, Dr. Dean Edell, Rob Stark, Mike Gallagher, Michael Medved, Dr. Laura, and G. Gordon Liddy.
