= WVVE =

WVVE may refer to:

- WFNX (FM), a defunct radio station (95.3 FM) formerly licensed to serve Grand Marais, Minnesota, United States, which held the call sign WVVE from 2018 to 2020
- WYYX, a radio station (97.7 FM) licensed to serve Bonifay, Florida, United States, which held the call sign WVVE from 2016 to 2017
- WWLY, a radio station (100.1 FM) licensed to serve Panama City Beach, Florida, which held the call sign WVVE from 2002 to 2016
- WMOS, a radio station (102.3 FM) licensed to serve Stonington, Connecticut, United States, which held the call sign WVVE from 1987 to 2000
- WORO (FM), a radio station (92.5 FM) licensed to serve Corozal, Puerto Rico, which held the call sign WVVE from 1968 to 1977
- WVVE (FM), a very low power radio station (91.7 FM) serving part of Miami Beach as a public service community station, playing smooth jazz since 2019.
