= WRKL =

Simulcast with WNYG, Patchogue, New York
- New City, New York; United States
- Broadcast area: Lower Hudson Valley
- Frequency: 910 kHz
- Branding: Radio Cantico Nuevo

Programming
- Language: Spanish
- Format: Christian radio

Ownership
- Owner: Cantico Nuevo Ministry, Inc.
- Sister stations: WJDM; WNYG

History
- First air date: July 4, 1964
- Call sign meaning: "Rockland County"

Technical information
- Licensing authority: FCC
- Facility ID: 50057
- Class: B
- Power: 1,000 watts (day); 800 watts (night)
- Transmitter coordinates: 41°10′52.34″N 74°2′51.51″W

Links
- Public license information: Public file; LMS
- Webcast: Listen live
- Website: radiocanticonuevo.com

WRKL (910 AM Radio Cantico Nuevo), is a radio station licensed to New City, New York, broadcasting a Spanish language Christian radio format.

WRKL is authorized for daytime operation at 1,000 watts and nighttime at 800 watts, using different directional patterns day and night, to protect other stations on 910 AM and adjacent frequencies from interference.

== History ==
WRKL first went on the air on July 4, 1964. It featured a format of adult contemporary music with local news and information. WRKL evolved into a news/talk format in the mid-1990s. On March 18, 1999, at 3 pm, the station signed off, concluding its English language programming. The $1.6 million sale of WRKL to Polnet Communications, Ltd., was consummated on March 19, 1999. Polish language programming began the next day.

The station fell silent on February 18, 2017, several days after the collapse of one of its daytime towers on February 13. The station returned to the air on Wednesday February 22, 2017. On March 9, 2017, an application was filed with the Federal Communications Commission for an Engineering Special Temporary Authority (STA) to allow operation of WRKL at 25% power (250 Watts day, 200 Watts night, both non-directional) while repairs were made. The STA was granted on March 13, 2017, and expired on September 9, 2017.

On October 31, 2017, owner Polnet filed an application with the commission for reinstatement "nunc pro tunc" and extension of its Engineering STA, noting the inadvertent failure to file a timely renewal prior to the September 9 expiration. In its approval, the Commission granted a six-month extension of the STA, allowing WRKL to continue to operate at 25% power, non-directionally, until May 2, 2018, but specifically excluded the period from the expiration of the initial STA and the grant date of the extension.

On May 8, 2018, Polnet filed a request with the commission to further extend the STA, stating that the company was continuing to gather quotes to rebuild the destroyed tower. On June 1, 2018, the request was granted, extending the authority to operate non-directionally at 25% power until December 1, 2018. On December 11, 2018, Polnet filed for another extension of the STA, indicating they were working to secure funds to reconstruct the destroyed tower. That request was granted on December 18, 2018, extending the STA until June 17, 2019.

On June 6, 2019, Polnet again filed to extend the STA, citing financial hardship as the reason the repairs had not yet been made. The request was granted on July 3, 2019, extending the STA until January 3, 2020. Subsequent STA extensions were granted by the FCC on February 3, 2020; August 12, 2020; February 26, 2021; and September 8, 2021. Starting with the STA request in July 2020, Polnet's application included language that Polnet was 'researching technical modifications that would permanently modify the facility', and that the financial hardship was being exacerbated by COVID-19, language that has been repeated in all subsequent STA filings.

An October 11, 2021, online article reported that the entire 12.7 acre WRKL transmitter site, including the building housing the station's studios and offices, had been sold in May 2021. WRKL had been off the air since September 10, 2021, and on November 12, 2021, owner Polnet Communications filed a Notice of Suspension of Operations with the FCC. It stated that the signal had been silenced in October 2021 due to a misunderstanding with, and removal of some equipment by the "landowner". It also stated that Polnet "would be sending an engineer shortly to restore service." On November 29, 2021, Polnet filed a "Request for Silent STA" with the commission, saying that they would be working on "an agreement with the landlord that will allow it to reinstall all needed equipment to restore service." The application was granted on February 3, 2022. On February 24, 2022, the station filed for an STA to return to the air with reduced power of 200 Watts. The application stated that an agreement had been reached with the landowner that would allow WRKL to broadcast temporarily from its Pomona location. The STA was approved by the Commission on February 28, 2022, and was valid for 6 months. The following day, March 1, WRKL returned to the air, simulcasting the Spanish Christian programming of WNYG, Patchogue, New York. The station operated under that STA and two subsequent STA extensions until going silent on May 1, 2023. The station resumed broadcasting on June 25, 2023.

On May 2, 2023, Polnet filed an application with the FCC for assignment of the WRKL license to Cantico Nuevo Ministry, Inc., a not-for-profit corporation. The station would be donated to Cantico Nuevo Ministry, Inc., whose "Radio Abundancia Divina" programming WRKL had been carrying since March 1, 2022. Polnet placed the value of the donation at $647,000, for the station, in "as-is" condition. Authorization and consent for the transfer was granted by the FCC on June 28, 2023, and was consummated August 29, 2023.

Although the WRKL license specifies 1,000 watts day/800 watts night DA2 operation, the station continues to operate with 200 watts fulltime, non-directional, from a single tower. The most recent FCC STA for such operation expired September 5, 2023.
