= WBZO =

WBZO may refer to:

- WBZO a radio station (98.5 FM) licensed to Westhampton, New York, United States
- WDRE (AM), a radio station (1570 AM) licensed to Riverhead, New York, which used the WBZO call sign from 2024 to 2025
- WWWF-FM, a radio station (103.1 FM) licensed to Bay Shore, New York, which used the WBZO call sign from 1993 to 2024
