= Vic Latino =

American DJ

- Born: Victor J. Canales; Long Island, New York
- Presenting career
- Show: Vic Latino's Neighborhood
- Station: WPTY
- Time slot: 6:00 a.m. - 10:00 a.m.
- Style: Radio presenter Disc jockey
- Country: United States
- Website: www.viclatino.com

Vic Latino (born Victor J. Canales in Long Island, New York) is an American radio and television personality of Spanish descent. He is co-founder of JVC Broadcasting which owns radio stations on Long Island and in the state of Florida.

In conjunction with his radio career, Canales has released several mix albums, including two volumes of ThriveMix, three volumes of Ultra.Dance and two volumes of Ultra.Mix (on ThriveDance and Ultra Records), 1980s Now, Summer Vibes and One Night in N.Y.C. (all on Tommy Boy Records).

== Career ==
=== Radio ===
Canales began his radio career as part of Ed Lover and Doctor Dré's morning show on Hot 97. He later moved to Long Island stations WBLI and WXXP, also WPYO in Orlando, Florida before landing a position at WKTU, where he helped make the station's p.m.-drive show the city's second-highest rated, behind only Funkmaster Flex's around the same time until November 2006.

After leaving WKTU, he joined BPM on Sirius/XM. He later returned to his hometown station WPTY, where he took the duties of the managing partner of Long Island's own WDRE, WLIR and WBON.

=== Television ===
Canales has made television appearances on various networks such as ABC, NBC, FOX, CBS and the WB. He also made an appearance on A&E's Growing Up Gotti and on the Emmy Award winning The Ellen DeGeneres Show, where he DJ'ed the opening monologue.

== Discography ==
=== Albums ===
- 2005: One Night in N.Y.C.

=== Mixed compilations ===
- 2002: 80s Now
- 2003: Summer Vibes
- 2004: Ultra.Dance 05
- 2005: Ultra.Dance 06
- 2006: ThriveMix 02
- 2007: ThriveMix 03
- 2008: Ultra.Mix
- 2009: Ultra.Mix 2
- 2011: Ultra.Dance 12
