= WRCN-FM =

- Riverhead, New York; United States
- Broadcast area: Eastern Long Island
- Frequency: 103.9 MHz
- Branding: LI News Radio

Programming
- Language: English
- Format: News/talk
- Affiliations: ABC News Radio; Fox News Radio; Westwood One

Ownership
- Owner: JVC Broadcasting; (JVC Media LLC, a Florida LLC Company)
- Sister stations: WBZO; WDRE; WJVC; WLIM; WPTY

History
- First air date: August 14, 1962
- Former call signs: WAPC-FM (1962–1967); WHRF-FM (1967–1972)

Technical information
- Licensing authority: FCC
- Facility ID: 18239
- Class: A
- ERP: 1,400 watts
- HAAT: 148 meters (486 ft)
- Transmitter coordinates: 40°51′8.4″N 72°45′53.4″W

Links
- Public license information: Public file; LMS
- Webcast: Listen live
- Website: linewsradio.com

WRCN-FM (103.9 MHz) is a radio station airing a news/talk radio format, licensed to serve Riverhead, New York. The station is owned by JVC Media LLC with studios located inside of Long Island MacArthur Airport in Ronkonkoma, New York, and transmitter located in Manorville, New York.

== History ==
The station first went on the air in 1962 as WAPC-FM. In 1967 the call letters were changed to WHRF-FM, and in 1972 to the current WRCN-FM. In 1978, WRCN changed from a top 40 format to what was then known as album-oriented rock (now known as classic rock). Some of the air–staff that have worked at the station over the years include, Zena Black, Bob Buchmann, Marc Coppola, John Loscalzo, Tim Sheehan, Dee Snider, and Chaz & AJ.

On August 27, 2012, WRCN-FM shifted their format to mainstream rock, under the "Rock of Long Island" slogan.

On November 15, 2013, at 5 pm, WRCN-FM's rock format came to an abrupt end as the station temporarily changed formats to Christmas music as "Christmas 103.9". The station then flipped to conservative news/talk as "LI News Radio 103.9" on December 26, 2013.
