= WYGC =

Coordinates: 29.821°N 82.573°W

Simulcasts WZLB, Valparaiso
- High Springs, Florida; United States
- Broadcast area: Gainesville metropolitan area
- Frequency: 104.9 MHz
- Branding: Florida Man Radio

Programming
- Format: Hot Talk
- Affiliations: Compass Media Networks

Ownership
- Owner: JVC Media; (JVC Mergeco, LLC)
- Sister stations: WMFQ, WXUS

History
- First air date: 1984 (as WKAE)
- Former call signs: WKAE (1983–1988); WYOC (1988–1998); WRKG (1998–1999); WXJZ (1999–2002); WDRS (August 1–8, 2002)

Technical information
- Licensing authority: FCC
- Facility ID: 59076
- Class: A
- ERP: 3,200 watts
- HAAT: 137 meters (449 ft)

Links
- Public license information: Public file; LMS
- Webcast: Listen Live
- Website: floridamanradio.com

WYGC (104.9 FM) is a commercial radio station licensed to High Springs, Florida, US serving the Gainesville metropolitan area. It broadcasts a Hot Talk radio format, simulcasting WZLB 103.1 FM Valparaiso. It is owned by JVC Media through licensee JVC Mergeco, LLC and calls itself Florida Man Radio.

== History ==
The station signed on the air in 1984. It previously broadcast a classic hits format as "104.9 WOW FM" until August 3, 2016, a country music format (simulcasting WTRS 102.3 FM Dunnellon, Florida) until February 10, 2014, and before that, a sports radio format as "105 The Game" until May 31, 2013.

On May 23, 2016, at 6 a.m., WOW FM moved over to sister station WXJZ, using a more powerful signal. On August 4, 2016, at midnight, WYGC ended its simulcast of WOW FM with WXJZ by flipping to a talk format branded as "104.9 - The Talk of Gainesville".

In 2017, WYGC flipped to a simulcast of WMFQ "Q92.9" in Ocala after a long period of dead air.

In March 2018, the station flipped to a 1980s-focused classic hits format branded as Y105. The station operated under a local marketing agreement by Circuitwerkes, using air staff from WGVR-LP. In early-November 2019, JVC Broadcasting announced that the station would flip to a hot talk format on November 11, Florida Man Radio, simulcasting WDYZ 660 AM in Orlando.

On July 7, 2023, JVC Media announced a sale of WYGC to the Educational Media Foundation for a reported amount of $454,235. After the deal was left unapproved in a holding pattern for the subsequent 2 1/2 years, JVC and Educational Media Foundation collectively called off the sale on March 13, 2026. Had the sale been approved, the station would certainly have flipped to contemporary Christian music under either of EMF's K-Love or Air 1 national networks with its license converted to non-commercial status, as EMF does so with all recently acquired affiliates.
