= WSVU =

Radio station in North Palm Beach, Florida

- North Palm Beach, Florida; United States
- Broadcast area: West Palm Beach, Florida
- Frequency: 960 kHz
- Branding: Radio Elite International

Programming
- Format: Haitian Creole

Ownership
- Owner: Jean Altidore; (United Group Elite Agency Investment LLC)

History
- First air date: October 13, 2003
- Former call signs: WGGT (2003–2005); WPBI (2005–2006)

Technical information
- Licensing authority: FCC
- Facility ID: 129188
- Class: B
- Power: 2,400 watts (day); 1,400 watts (night)
- Transmitter coordinates: 26°49′1.00″N 80°15′7.00″W
- Translators: 92.5 W223CJ (West Palm Beach); 101.7 W269DS (North Palm Beach)

Links
- Public license information: Public file; LMS

WSVU (960 AM, "Radio Elite International") is a commercial Haitian Creole-language radio station licensed to North Palm Beach, Florida. Owned by Jean Altidore, through licensee United Group Elite Agency Investment LLC, the station serves West Palm Beach and surrounding areas. Besides a standard analog transmission, the station simulcasts over low-power FM translators W223CJ (92.5 FM) in West Palm Beach and W269DS (101.7 FM) in North Palm Beach. WSVU's studios are located in Palm Beach Gardens and the transmitter is sited in West Palm Beach.

== History ==
The station got its Federal Communications Commission (FCC) construction permit in 2003 as WGGT. On October 28, 2005, the still unbuilt station changed its call sign to WPBI, and signed on the air in 2006. Owned by Intermart Broadcasting of Southwest Florida, the original power was 1,200 watts by day, 250 watts at night.

The call letters were changed to WSVU on October 1, 2006; carrying an adult standards music format and featuring news updates from CBS Radio News, the station was owned by North Palm Beach Broadcasting, Inc. On May 14, 2014, North Palm Beach Broadcasting announced that it had sold WSVU and its translators to JVC Media, pending FCC approval. The sale closed effective September 8, 2014, at a purchase price of $850,000.

On October 6, 2014, WSVU and its FM translator at 95.9 MHz changed their format to soft adult contemporary, branded as "95.9 The Palm".

On August 15, 2017, the oldies format of WBGF moved to WSVU. The station used the syndicated network known as The True Oldies Channel.

By November 2017, JVC Media co-founder Vic Canales, in a deal worth $450,000, sold his ownership position in the company. Canales, better known by his on-air name "Vic Latino," stuck a deal to swap his stake in the nine-year old company for 960 WSVU in West Palm Beach. Canales exchanged his shares worth a combined $450,000 for WSVU and two translators: the North Palm Beach-licensed translator W240CI at 95.9 FM and the Jupiter-licensed translator W295BJ at 106.9 FM. Together the three signals were branded as "True Oldies Channel 95.9-106.9." The transaction was consummated on January 29, 2018. Once the deal closed, JVC Media of South Florida continued to own and operate WSWN 900 AM.

WSVU dropped the "True Oldies" format on November 1, 2019 (which continues on W240CI and W295BJ; instead relaying WIRK's HD3 digital subchannel) and stunted with Christmas music during the holiday season as "Rudolph's Radio 92.5/101.7"; the stunt gave way to classic rock branded "The Surf 92.5/101.7" that December 25.

On October 17, 2021, WSVU changed their format from classic rock to Haitian Creole language programming, branded as "Radio Elite International". Effective November 16, 2021, Vic Canales sold WSVU to Jean Altidore's United Group Elite Agency Investment LLC for $1.1 million.

== Translators ==
WSVU rebroadcasts on the following two FM translators:

Broadcast translators for WSVU
Call sign	Frequency	City of license	FID	ERP (W)	HAAT	Class	FCC info
W223CJ	92.5 FM	West Palm Beach, Florida	158103	240	362 m (1,188 ft)	D	LMS
W269DS	101.7 FM	North Palm Beach, Florida	203263	190	166 m (545 ft)	D	LMS
