= WMFQ =

- Ocala, Florida; United States
- Broadcast area: Ocala metropolitan area
- Frequency: 92.9 MHz
- Branding: Q92.9

Programming
- Format: Contemporary hits
- Affiliations: Premiere Networks

Ownership
- Owner: JVC Media, LLC; (JVC Mergeco, LLC)
- Sister stations: WXUS, WYGC

History
- First air date: July 11, 1977
- Call sign meaning: We Mean Fine Quality

Technical information
- Licensing authority: FCC
- Facility ID: 3058
- Class: C2
- ERP: 50,000 watts
- HAAT: 145 meters (476 ft)
- Transmitter coordinates: 29.079°N 82.092°W

Links
- Public license information: Public file; LMS
- Webcast: Listen live
- Website: myq92.com

WMFQ (92.9 FM) is a commercial radio station licensed to Ocala, Florida, United States, broadcasting to the Ocala metropolitan area and North-Central Florida. It is owned by JVC Media and airs a contemporary hits format branded as "Q92.9". The station's studios are located on SW 7th Street in Ocala.

WMFQ's transmitter is sited off of SE 36th Avenue at SE 95th Street in Belleview.

== History ==
WMFQ signed on the air on July 11, 1977. The call sign stood for We Mean Fine Quality, as in the station's "quality" music. It played quarter hour sweeps of instrumental songs and occasional soft vocals as a beautiful music station. Through the 1980s, the playlist added more vocals and scaled back on instrumentals. By 1990, nearly all instrumentals were eliminated and the station evolved into soft adult contemporary. It used the slogan "Q-Lite 92.9" and then "Q92.9." In 1995, WMFQ was acquired by the Asterisk Radio Corporation for $2.1 million.

The station shifted to oldies and classic hits in 2004. It called itself "Big Oldies 92.9", using the slogan "Biggest Hits of the 60s and 70s", although WMFQ also played a fair amount of music from the 1980s, having added artists like Madonna, Michael Jackson, Cyndi Lauper, Prince, George Michael, Tiffany, and Culture Club to its playlist.

On August 1, 2011, WMFQ changed the format to hot adult contemporary, branded as "92Q". That lasted for two years.

On June 1, 2013, JVC Broadcasting purchased WMFQ from Asterisk Communications along with WTRS, WBXY, WXJZ and WYGC. WMFQ was then re-branded as "Q92". With the new ownership and management, longtime morning host Bill Barr was promoted to Program Director.

In October 2013, WMFQ made a shift to mainstream Top 40/CHR focusing on the biggest hits and new music. WMFQ is now the only station with a city-grade signal in Ocala area playing 'hit music'. In the Gainesville area of the Gainesville-Ocala radio market, 105.3 WYKS also airs a CHR/Top 40 format but with its 3,000-watt signal, it is difficult to hear in Ocala. WMFQ programming was previously heard on 104.9 WYGC in the Gainesville area, as WMFQ's signal is hard to hear in some parts of the Gainesville area. But WYGC is being sold to a Christian radio organization.

Logo until 2017

On January 25, 2021, WMFQ began airing Elvis Duran and the Morning Show for its wake-up program. Local morning hosts Jenn Ryan and Kevin "Bus" Birdhouse were transferred to WYOY in Jackson, Mississippi.
