= WHFM =

Simulcasts WBAB, Babylon
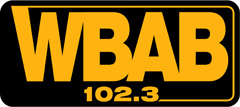
- Southampton, New York; United States
- Broadcast area: Eastern Long Island
- Frequency: 95.3 MHz (HD Radio)
- Branding: 102.3 WBAB

Programming
- Language: English
- Format: Classic rock

Ownership
- Owner: Cox Media Group; (CMG NY/Texas Radio, LLC)
- Sister stations: WBAB; WBLI

History
- First air date: October 28, 1971
- Former call signs: WWRJ (1971–1979); WSBH (1979–1987)

Technical information
- Licensing authority: FCC
- Facility ID: 72176
- Class: A
- ERP: 5,000 watts
- HAAT: 108 meters (354 ft)
- Transmitter coordinates: 40°56′5.3″N 72°23′13.3″W

Links
- Public license information: Public file; LMS
- Website: www.wbab.com

WHFM (95.3 FM) is a classic rock radio station licensed to Southampton, New York, and serving eastern Long Island. It is owned by Cox Radio and simulcasts 102.3 WBAB.

== History ==
The station began broadcasting as WWRJ on October 28, 1971, airing a beautiful music format. In 1979, it was sold to Beach Broadcasting for $700,000. In March 1979, its call sign was changed to WSBH, and it began airing an adult contemporary format. In 1985, the station was sold to a subsidiary of Faircom Inc. for $2,150,000. In 1987, its call sign was changed to WHFM. In June 1992, WHFM adopted a rock format, simulcasting WBAB. In 1994, the station was sold to Liberty Broadcasting for $1,850,000. In 1998, it was sold to Cox Radio.
