= WBGF (disambiguation) =

WBGF is a radio station serving the West Palm Beach, Florida market.

== Other uses ==
- Long Lellang Airport, with ICAO airport code WBGF
- World Backgammon Federation (WBGF)
