= WWVV =

WWVV may refer to:

- WWVV (FM), a radio station (105.9 FM) in Panama City, Florida, United States
- WLHH, a radio station (104.9 FM) in Ridgeland, South Carolina, which held the call sign WWVV from 2003 to 2006
- WUBB, a radio station (106.9 FM) in Bluffton, South Carolina, which held the call sign WWVV from 1998 to 2003
- WBBX (FM), a radio station (106.1 FM) in Pocomoke City, Maryland, which held the call sign WWVV from 1994 to 1995
- WKZP, a radio station (95.9 FM) in West Ocean City, Maryland, which briefly held the call sign WWVV in 1994
