= WLIR =

Digital radio station

WDARE
- United States
- Branding: Dare FM

Programming
- Language: English
- Format: Alternative rock

History
- First air date: September 2005 (streaming)

Links
- Webcast: Listen live
- Website: wdarefm.com

WLIR was a radio station that played a new music–modern rock format on the frequencies 92.7 FM, 98.5 FM, and 107.1 FM from the 1980s into the 2000s. Bob Wilson, longtime WLIR employee and historian, created the website WDAREFM.COM (Dare FM), which maintains the spirit of the original WLIR. He also programs the music playlist. The website broadcasts a mix of alternative rock from the past and present day, along with former WLIR/WDRE personalities, such as Larry The Duck, Drew Kenyon, Andre, and Rob Rush.

== WLIR on FM radio ==
WLIR was best known as an influential radio station that launched the careers of many music acts and disc jockeys from the 1970s through the 1990s. In 1970, it changed to a progressive rock format before switching to a new music/modern rock format in 1982. The station originally broadcast from studios at the Garden City Hotel in Garden City, New York, then 175 Fulton Avenue, Hempstead, New York, 1600 Stewart Avenue, Westbury, New York, and finally, 1103 Stewart Avenue, East Garden City, New York, with its transmitter located at the North Shore Towers in Floral Park, New York.

=== 92.7 FM beginnings (1959–1970) ===
WLIR was founded in 1959 by John R. Rieger. It was licensed to Garden City, New York on the frequency 92.7 FM and played a mix of Broadway show tunes, jazz and light classical music from a basement studio in the Garden City Hotel.

=== The progressive era (1970–1982) ===
The WLIR logo from 1979.

In spring 1970, announcers Richard Neer and Mike Harrison convinced Rieger to change to a progressive rock radio format, with Harrison as program director. This meant playing obscure artists, playing album cuts instead of just hit singles, and having disc jockeys speak in a casual, conversational tone. The new format debuted on July 1, 1970. The station also began its long-running series of live concert broadcasts from the nearby Ultrasonic Recording Studios and later from local clubs such as My Father's Place and The Ritz. Artists featured on the series included Bruce Springsteen, the Allman Brothers Band, Dr. John, Jackson Browne, the Doobie Brothers, Billy Joel, Hall & Oates and many other notable performers of the era. In addition to the live concert series, WLIR promoted local bands such as the Good Rats.

Neer and Harrison departed for progressive-rock WNEW-FM in 1971. The air staff in the early '70s included program director Ken Kohl, George Taylor Morris, Jim Cameron, Joel Moss, Malcolm Davis (later a longtime Boston radio host as "Austin from Boston" on WODS), Charlie Ahl (WPLJ, WHN and WCBS-FM NYC as Chris Charles), Dave ("The Wrench") Friedman, Ray White, Earle Bailey, production director Ben Manilla, and public-affairs producer Heather Schoen.

As the 1970s went on, many rock stations drifted toward more commercial album-oriented rock formats. WLIR would buck this trend by playing the increasingly popular punk rock and new wave music genres that were being ignored by other rock stations in the United States.

==== First Confirmation of the murder of John Lennon ====
The first official confirmation of Lennon's death on December 8, 1980, apparently came from WLIR's news director Steve North, according to North and DJ Bob Waugh. North was doing a special comment on the murder of gun control advocate Dr. Michael J. Halberstam, when an intern ran in with the news about Lennon. North then read the AP wire bulletin and spoke several times with a police contact, who was finally able to confirm Lennon had died at 11:24. Waugh has since released an aircheck from that night.

=== "Dare to Be Different" (1982–1991) ===
In 1982, it was decided that for the station to move into the future, a format change was needed. Program director Denis McNamara recommended to the station's owner that he choose one of two formats, either progressive adult contemporary music or new music. Although adult contemporary seemed commercially appealing, new music was chosen because it was more in step with the "dare to be different" campaign being used to promote the new format and it was more "fun". Denis and his staff were also playing pieces of new music from England and the NYC CBGB movement starting in the late 1970s, with Denis closely following publications like NME, always wanting to stay ahead of what was trending with new music across the globe. It was a perfect solution to what was needed in New York, since none of the other stations were going to "touch that stuff" On August 2, the format switch occurred, and the station featured new wave (McNamara "hated" that term because he felt it was a trendy phrase that might be out of style in a year), synth-pop, post-punk, early alternative rock acts and novelty songs. The personalities of the disc jockeys became much more upbeat.

The station became known for playing new artists, and occasionally playing singles before other stations. For example, as shown in the 2017 documentary Dare to Be Different - WLIR: The Voice of a Generation (see § WLIR/WDRE legacy), WLIR played the Frankie Goes to Hollywood single Relax just six days after its U.K. release, six months before the record company released it in the United States. The station arranged with a record store in London to get same-day air delivery of new records (years before this was the norm) from Heathrow Airport; WLIR music director Rosie Pisani would drive the 12 miles (19 km) to nearby JFK on Thursday afternoons to pick up the records. WLIR also teamed with Dutch East India Trading, an independent record import company in the neighboring village of Rockville Centre, New York, to bring in test pressings before the finished records were mass-produced.

WLIR's listeners could dial in to vote for the "Screamer of the Week", the top new song of the week. New Order, Depeche Mode, Ultravox, Yazoo and Blancmange were early staples of the new music format. According to McNamara, the "entire music industry was looking upon 'LIR and that 'LIR marketplace of New York City and Long Island as one of the hippest music areas of the world. People used to refer to it as the gateway to America if you were an upcoming artist."

WLIR's success had grown the profits of its operators, 1959 founder John R. Rieger and his partner Elton Spitzer's Phoenix Media Corp., with an increasing share of the New York market, major concert promotions and popular dance club promotions. The station's FCC license had been changed to a special temporary authority in 1972 as the result of slow-moving legal battle that had gone dormant later in the 1970s. The legal battle escalated when the station became more valuable, with new entities (not involved in the original 1972 battle) getting involved after 1982, culminating with the FCC revoking Phoenix Media's 15-year "temporary" license in 1987. As a result of this revocation, Jarad Broadcasting wrested control of the broadcast license for frequency 92.7, taking ownership on December 18, 1987. The permanent license did not include the call letters, so the new licensee operated with the call letters WDRE, while Phoenix Media brought the WLIR call letters to an AM radio station in Rockland County, New York. Phoenix Media also took the "Dare To Be Different" slogan as intellectual property, so WDRE's moniker became "New Music First". The "Screamer of the Week" feature became "Shriek of the Week", but WDRE remained committed to new music as they introduced new bands into the next decade, such as Nine Inch Nails and Nirvana.

=== Alternative rock expands: The Underground Network (1991–1996) ===
In 1991, the station changed its moniker again, this time to "The Cutting Edge of Rock". The explosion in popularity of grunge and alternative rock in the early 1990s led to a period of turmoil. The synthpop-based music on which much of the station's playlist was based was now out of fashion. Alternative rock artists that formerly were played almost exclusively on the station were now being heard on many rock and pop music stations.

In 1992, WDRE started simulcasting its programming with what was 103.9 WIBF-FM Jenkintown, Pennsylvania, which later became WDRE Jenkintown/Philadelphia. In 1995, WDRE created the first alternative rock network, known as the "Underground Network" and consisting of the following stations:

Underground Network
Call sign in 1995	Frequency	Broadcast area	State	Current (Note: As of January 30, 2025) call sign
KDRE	101.1 FM	Little Rock	Arkansas	KDXE
WYKT (Note: Nights only)	105.5 FM	Wilmington	Illinois	WYKT
WUNX	93.5 FM	Mashpee/Cape Cod	Massachusetts	WFRQ
WUNZ	101.1 FM	Mashpee/Cape Cod	Massachusetts	WHYA
WWCP	96.7 FM	Albany	New York	WMHH
WDRE (Note: Flagship station)	92.7 FM	Garden City/New York City	New York	WFME-FM
WMRW	98.5 FM	Westhampton/Eastern Long Island	New York	WBZO
WIBF	103.9 FM	Jenkintown/Philadelphia	Pennsylvania	WPHI-FM
KFTH	107.1 FM	Memphis	Tennessee	KXHT
WRLG	94.1 FM	Nashville	Tennessee	WAIV

Notes:

Four years after WIBF became WDRE's first affiliate, the Underground Network was disbanded. In 1996, WDRE switched to an adult album alternative (AAA) format, brought back Malibu Sue (who had been fired earlier by then-program director Russ Mottla), reverted its call letters back to WLIR and changed its moniker to "The Island". That same year, WDRE Philadelphia became a local, independent modern-rock station.

The WLIR logo used from 1998 to sign off on September 1, 2004, designed by Jane Incao.

=== After the Underground Network (1996–2004) ===
In 1997, Jeff Levine was named program director, Gary Cee assistant program director, and night jock Lynda Lopez became music director. New features implemented during this era included Malibu Sue's All-Request Morning, the 5:00 Rush, Flashback Lunch, LIR After Dark, Andre's 9:00 Knockout and "In the Mix," an alternative dance show with DJ Theo and Andre. The station had a different sound during that era, formed by a combination of alternative chart-toppers like Coldplay, Foo Fighters and No Doubt with alternative dance from Daft Punk, Wolfsheim, Moby, Fatboy Slim and others. Gary Cee took over as program director and brought in British DJ The English Muffin (Orli Auslander) for the afternoon drive and Drew Kenyon joined Maria Chambers on the Morning Show. This sound helped WLIR's ratings and would continue until the station's end on January 9, 2004.

=== Move to 107.1 FM and brief NeoBreeze (2004–2008) ===
The WLIR "The Box" logo used during 2004 when the station changed its frequency.

On January 9, 2004, Univision bought the 92.7 frequency and other assets for $60 million and began simulcasting the Spanish radio format of WCAA Newark, New Jersey on 92.7 under the call letters WZAA. WLIR signed off at noon with a special dance version of "Forever Young" by Alphaville. Andre Ferro would be the last DJ heard on the 92.7 airwaves, followed by a message from ownership. The WLIR call letters moved to the 107.1 frequency on Eastern Long Island, which had been simulcasting WLIR for several years. The new WLIR adopted an active/modern rock format and new image as "The Box". As 107.1 FM is located about 50 miles east of the original WLIR in Garden City, many of the station's fans in New York City, southwestern Connecticut, southern Westchester County, New York, northeastern New Jersey and even the western parts of Long Island itself could not easily receive the station. Many of these areas were closer geographically to other stations occupying 107.1 FM (WXPK in central Westchester County and WWZY in Long Branch, New Jersey), which hindered reception.

On September 12, 2005, WLIR changed formats to a block-sponsored smooth jazz/chill music format known as "FM Channel 107: NeoBreeze". This same block-sponsored type of format was instituted at two other stations owned by the Morey Organization, WLIR's owner. As a result of this change, all of the on-air staff was fired. This truly marked the end of WLIR's unique over-the-air "new music" format after almost three decades. In addition, with the new format, the station would run commercial-free during the day, with the actual airtime during this period paid for by advertisers. According to the station's owners, this was an attempt to take on satellite radio and MP3 players, which had been cutting into listeners of traditional radio. In an effort to keep WLIR and its alternative music alive, longtime employee and historian Bob Wilson developed the website WLIR.FM and began an internet broadcast of music called "Next Wave".

On December 20, 2005, after three months of low ratings, the NeoBreeze format was dropped, and the WLIR alternative format returned.

Jeff Levine was at the station from 2006 to 2007. During that time, WLIR had a safe, almost hot adult contemporary sound, similar to that of WPLJ, and carried broadcasts of New York Islanders hockey games.

On December 26, 2006, BusinessTalkRadio.net president and CEO Michael Metter announced the purchase of three Long Island radio stations: alternative WLIR-FM (107.1 FM), classic rock WBON (98.5 FM), and Top 40/rhythmic WDRE (105.3 FM). WBON was renamed WBZB and flipped to a business talk format on January 2, 2007. The sales of WLIR-FM and WBZB were approved on February 27, 2007. The selling price for WLIR-FM and WBZB was $1.75 million for each station, and the total price for all three stations would have been $5 million, but the sale was never completed, and WBZB returned to the WBON call letters.

In September 2007, WLIR began broadcasting from a new antenna at a location five miles to the west of the original. On October 11, 2007, WLIR-FM began simulcasting on a translator in Manorville, W245BA (96.9 FM), expanding its coverage area into western Suffolk County and a portion of eastern Nassau County. On November 18, 2007, this simulcast of WLIR-FM ended with the new simulcast of 98.5 WBON, "La Fiesta", taking over the 96.9 frequency.

=== ESPN simulcast (2008–2011) ===
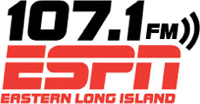
The WLIR 107.1/ESPN Logo used from January 2008 thru July 2011

On January 3, 2008, partly because of the reach of the new antenna, WLIR-FM began simulcasting programming from sister station WDRE (Party 105), fueling speculation that a change in format to ESPN was imminent. On January 21, 2008, WLIR-FM became an ESPN Radio affiliate via a local marketing agreement with New York City radio station WEPN (1050 AM).

=== Jarad sells 107.1 FM (2011) ===
On February 9, 2011, Jarad Broadcasting of Hampton Bays entered into an asset purchase agreement with Holding Out Hope Church (WLIX Radio) to sell the station for $650,000. On February 17, 2011, Holding Out Hope Church assigned the agreement to Livingstone Broadcasting, Inc. On May 25, 2011, the sale of WLIR-FM to Livingstone was completed. On August 1, 2011, WLIR-FM began broadcasting Christian programming as part of the WLIX Hope radio network.

== WDARE (Dare FM) ==
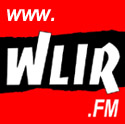
The WLIR.FM logo used from 2005 to 2020

WLIR.FM began streaming online in 2005. It captured the style of the original WLIR, including the alternative music, air personalities, sounders, jingles, shrieks and screamers, along with the new music of the present day. In 2016, WLIR.FM began simulcasting on WPTY-HD3. The simulcast ended in 2020.

107.1 WLIR-FM, which hadn't broadcast alternative music since 2008, was sold to Red Apple Media Inc., and began simulcasting most of WABC's programming. Red Apple objected to the site's use of the WLIR.FM domain name, which used the same call sign of WLIR-FM. In November 2020, WLIR.FM changed its name to WDAREFM.com (Dare FM), and continues to broadcast the same alternative music and WLIR personalities that it has done for the last 15 years.

== WLIR/WDRE legacy ==
After five years of production, the documentary entitled Dare to Be Different - WLIR: The Voice of a Generation by Ellen Goldfarb debuted at the Tribeca Film Festival in April 2017. It details WLIR's history, program director Denis McNamara and team's August 1982 format change, the influence the station had and its battles with the FCC. The station's staff, musical firsts and fans are documented. After the premiere, A Flock of Seagulls, the Beat's Dave Wakeling and the Alarm played live sets.

=== People and personalities ===
Many WLIR personalities have had continued success and notoriety both on and off the air. Some of these include:

- Alex "Alley Cat" Anthony
- Amy "AJ Mistress of Modern Rock" Paige – On-air at WKDF Nashville
- Barry (Ravioli) Carollo – died in 2014
- Ben Manilla – died in 2024
- Bob ("The Mighty") Waugh
- Caroline Corley – died in 2013
- Chuck D (born 1960) - rapper
- Denis McNamara – consultant at NYM, Inc. Inducted into the Long Island Music Hall of Fame in 2010.
- Dennis Daniel
- Donna Donna – On air at WBAB, appeared in the 1989 concert film 101 and 2011 rockumentary about The Replacements, Color Me Obsessed
- Elton Spitzer – Took over WLIR in 1973, died in 2016
- Eric Bloom — "The Bozo Patrol"
- Flo & Eddie — "By the Fireside"
- Gary Cee – former program director, now general manager and morning host on Pocono 96.7 WABT (became Pocono 103.1 due to a station swap in March 2023)
- George Taylor Morris — died in 2009
- Jeff Levine – former program director; died in 2020
- John ("Don't Call Me Johnny") DeBella — Former morning drive personality at WMGK, Philadelphia
- John R. Rieger – former owner, died in 2005
- Lazlow — "The Technofile" and "Underground Hard Drive"
- (John) Loscalzo – died in 2015
- Lynda Lopez — now mid-day anchor at WINS AM/FM
- Malibu Sue – now with the Port Authority of New York and New Jersey as a strategic communications analyst; also files traffic reports for WINS
- Pete "Captain Traffic" Tauriello — Former traffic reporter at Metro Networks New York - SiriusXM Channel 133 and WKXW-FM
- Ray White – died in 2021
- Richard Neer — announcer at WFAN AM & FM
- Steve "The Pistol" Jones – disc jockey-news anchor; now CEO-president at Skyview Networks
- Vin Scelsa

== See also ==
- List of Internet radio stations
- WFME-FM — the current Garden City, New York radio station at 92.7 FM
- WBZO — the current Westhampton, New York radio station at 98.5 FM
- WLIR-FM — the current Hampton Bays, New York radio station at 107.1 FM
