= WJVC =

- Center Moriches, New York; United States
- Broadcast area: Eastern Long Island
- Frequency: 96.1 MHz
- Branding: My Country 96.1

Programming
- Language: English
- Format: Country music

Ownership
- Owner: JVC Broadcasting; (JVC Media LLC, a Florida LLC Company)
- Sister stations: WBZO; WDRE; WLIM; WPTY; WRCN-FM

History
- First air date: November 22, 1996
- Former call signs: WLVG (1996–2010); WKJI (2010–2011)
- Call sign meaning: JVC Broadcasting

Technical information
- Licensing authority: FCC
- Facility ID: 54519
- Class: A
- ERP: 2,650 watts
- HAAT: 152 meters (499 ft)
- Transmitter coordinates: 40°51′08″N 72°45′55″W

Links
- Public license information: Public file; LMS
- Website: www.licountry.com

WJVC (96.1 FM, "My Country 96.1") is a country music radio station, licensed to Center Moriches, New York and serving eastern Long Island. The station is owned by JVC Media LLC with studios located in Ronkonkoma, New York, and transmitter located in Manorville, New York.

As WKJI, the station simulcast adult contemporary WKJY until its purchase by JVC Media in January 2011. WKJI then adopted a country format as WJVC, bringing the format back to Long Island after an absence of seven years.
