= WFTU =

WFTU may refer to:

- World Federation of Trade Unions
- WDRE (AM), a radio station (1570 AM) licensed to serve Riverhead, New York, United States, which held the call sign WFTU from 2001 to 2024
