= WWVV (FM) =

Coordinates: 30.3283°N 85.6894°W

- Panama City, Florida; United States
- Broadcast area: Bay County, Florida
- Frequency: 105.9 MHz
- Branding: 105.9 The Wave

Programming
- Format: Adult hits

Ownership
- Owner: JVC Broadcasting; (JVC Media of Florida, LLC)
- Sister stations: WWLY; WYOO; WYYX

History
- First air date: April 21, 1985 (as WLVV at 106.3)
- Former call signs: WLVV (1985–1987); WILN (1988–2025)
- Former frequencies: 106.3 MHz (1985–1988)
- Call sign meaning: "Wave"

Technical information
- Licensing authority: FCC
- Facility ID: 4125
- Class: C2
- ERP: 50,000 watts
- HAAT: 117 meters

Links
- Public license information: Public file; LMS

WWVV (105.9 FM, "105.9 The Wave") is a US commercial radio station located in Panama City, Florida. WWVV airs a variety hits music format. The station is an affiliate of the Tampa Bay Buccaneers radio network.

== History ==
WWVV first went on the air on April 21, 1985, at 9:20 AM with a small 6 kW signal on 106.3 MHz as WLVV"Love-FM", a soft adult contemporary station geared toward women between 25 and 54. Due to reception issues and below-average ratings, the format went off-air in the afternoon of October 31, 1987.

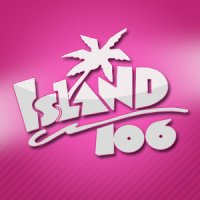
Logo as "Island 106"

In the name of "bringing the fun back to radio", owners Jim and Bertie Broaddus revamped the station, and WILN "Island 106" came into being on November 2, 1987. Originally, WILN played a classic rock format, directly competing with WFSY. In 1989, WILN upgraded to 50 kW and moved to its current 105.9 frequency. Over the next year, the format evolved from classic rock to a rock-leaning Top 40 format, eventually shifting completely to a mainstream Top 40/CHR format, competing against WPFM. After the sale of WPFM to Educational Media Foundation in 2018, WILN was the Panama City market's only Top 40/CHR radio station.

WILN and its sister stations WYYX, WYOO, and WWLY were sold to JVC Broadcasting in June 2025. On September 12, 2025, WILN silently changed its calls to WWVV, dropping the Top 40/CHR format ten days later and stunting with commercial and TV jingles as "Jingle 105.9". By the end of the month, the station had temporarily returned to the CHR format, but with no branding and a reduced looped playlist. On October 10, the station flipped to adult hits as "105.9 The Wave", mirroring (but not simulcasting) a similarly-branded format at JVC's WWAV in Fort Walton Beach
