= WZFL =

- Islamorada, Florida; United States
- Broadcast area: Miami-Dade County, Florida; South Florida; Florida Keys
- Frequency: 93.5 MHz
- Branding: Revolution 93.5

Programming
- Language: English
- Format: Dance/EDM
- Affiliations: Compass Media Networks

Ownership
- Owner: ANCO Media Group; (Marco Mazzoli)
- Sister stations: WBGF

History
- First air date: 2013
- Call sign meaning: "South Florida"

Technical information
- Licensing authority: FCC
- Facility ID: 189556
- Class: C2
- ERP: 50,000 watts
- HAAT: 118 meters (387 ft)
- Transmitter coordinates: 24°57′34″N 80°34′30″W
- Translators: 93.5 W228BY (Miami, relays WQAM-FM HD4)
- Repeaters: 93.5 WBGF (Belle Glade); 104.3 WQAM-FM HD4 (Miramar)

Links
- Public license information: Public file; LMS
- Webcast: Listen live
- Website: www.revolution935.com

WZFL (93.5 FM) is a radio station licensed to Islamorada, Florida, and serves South Florida metropolitan areas of Miami, Dade County, and the Florida Keys. The station also utilizes a pair of relay transmitters that also broadcast at 93.5, W228BY (licensed to Miami, Florida, and simulcasting WQAM-FM HD4), and WBGF (licensed to Belle Glade). WZFL itself is owned by ANCO Media Group and features programming from Compass Media Networks.

The studios for the station are located on Northwest 23rd Avenue in the Edgewater neighborhood of Miami. WZFL's transmitter is located on Windley Key in Islamorada, while W228BY's transmitter is located atop Southeast Financial Center in Downtown Miami and also Broward County.

== History ==
Originally, W228BY was one of two translators that simulcast WIOD. On March 12, 2013, during the Winter Music Conference, W228BY flipped to dance as Evolution 93.5. The station started broadcasting on WHYI-FM's HD2 subchannel as of late 2013.

On May 11, 2015, the station would gain independence from "Evolution" to add more programming that was exclusive to the station under the new ownership of Marco Mazzoli and his partnership formed company, Zoo Communications, as iHeart began leasing out the translator and WHYI-FM HD2 to Mazzoli. On October 5, 2015, another translator, W284CS 104.7 FM, was added as a simulcast to cover the northern part of Dade County and southern portions of Broward County, and with that, the station then repositioned itself as "Revolution Radio," dropping the "Evolution" branding altogether. The station is also a monitored reporter on Billboard's Dance/Mix Show Airplay panel.

On May 22, 2015, Zoo (which has since been renamed ANCO Media Group) acquired WZFL (based in Islamorada/Key Largo), which signed on as a simulcast of Revolution Radio in 2016. On July 1, 2016, Zoo expanded its reach to Fort Lauderdale proper by acquiring W228BV, which simulcasted WMIA-FM's HD2 sub-channel (which airs a country format), and on November 17 of that year, swapped its 104.7 translator to iHeart in order to synchronize the 93.5 signal in that area.

On May 19, 2017, ANCO acquired WBGF (based in Belle Glade/West Palm Beach) from JVC Media. Upon the completion of its transmitter move to properly serve the West Palm Beach area, the station flipped to Dance and adopt the "Revolution Radio" branding to mirror WZFL.
