= WRXB =

- Panama City Beach, Florida; United States
- Broadcast area: Panama City
- Frequency: 100.1 MHz
- Branding: Rebel Radio 100.1

Programming
- Format: Classic country

Ownership
- Owner: JVC Broadcasting
- Sister stations: WWVV; WYOO; WYYX

History
- First air date: 1989
- Former call signs: WPCF-FM (1987–2000); WQJM (2000–2002); WVVE (2002–2016); WYYX (2016–2017); WWLY (2017–2026)

Technical information
- Licensing authority: FCC
- Facility ID: 72956
- Class: C3
- ERP: 12,000 watts
- HAAT: 123.1 meters (404 ft)
- Transmitter coordinates: 30°19′41.00″N 85°41′22.00″W
- Repeaters: 105.3 WPTY-HD3 (Calverton-Roanoke, New York)

Links
- Public license information: Public file; LMS
- Webcast: Listen live
- Website: therebelfm.com

WRXB (100.1 FM, "Rebel Radio 100.1") is a radio station airing a classic country format, licensed to serve Panama City Beach, Florida, United States. The station is owned by JVC Broadcasting.

== History ==
The station was assigned the call sign WPCF-FM on December 3, 1987.

On March 10, 2000, the station changed its call sign to WQJM, under the "Jammin' Hits 100.1" moniker. It dropped this format for variety hits in 2001, branded as "Wave 100.1", and changed its call sign again on June 25, 2006, to WVVE. Over time, this format transitioned to include some classic hits staples. In 2010, the format was spun to female-oriented hot AC, under the new branding "V-100".

On April 15, 2014, at 10 am, WVVE dropped its Hot AC format and began stunting with a loop of the song "Let's Groove" by Earth, Wind & Fire. The station and its website were promoting that on the 17th, at 10 am, "Panama City will find its groove". The station flipped at that time to Rhythmic Oldies as Groove 100.1".

On the night of July 31, 2016, a direct lightning strike destroyed the transmitter of sister station WYYX "97X". On August 8, WVVE would abruptly shift its format from rhythmic oldies to the 97X active rock format, as its original 97.7 FM frequency went silent. While operating as 97X, WVVE changed its call sign to WYYX on November 2, 2016.

On March 17, 2017, 100.1 FM dropped the "97X" active rock format and began stunting with Christmas music as "100.1 Santa FM". Despite 97.7 re-adopting its WYYX calls the same day, the former WVVE would become known as WWLY during this switch.

At 8 am on March 23, 2017, the station began playing classic country, under the "Wild Willie 100.1" branding.

WWLY and its sister stations WILN, WYOO, and WYYX were sold to JVC Broadcasting in June 2025.

On February 1, 2026, WWLY rebranded as "Rebel Radio 100.1", under its new call sign WRXB.
