= WBOE (FM) =

- Bonifay, Florida; United States
- Broadcast area: Panama City, Florida
- Frequency: 97.7 MHz
- Branding: 92.1 and 97.7 The Bone

Programming
- Format: AOR/Mainstream Rock
- Affiliations: Compass Media Networks; United Stations Radio Networks

Ownership
- Owner: JVC Broadcasting
- Sister stations: WRXB, WWVV, WYOO

History
- First air date: 23 April 1983; 43 years ago as WTBB
- Former call signs: WTBB (1981–1997); WYYX (1997–2016); WVVE (2016–2017); WYYX (2017-2026)
- Call sign meaning: Bone

Technical information
- Licensing authority: FCC
- Facility ID: 25412
- Class: C1
- ERP: 100,000 watts
- HAAT: 253 meters (830 ft)
- Transmitter coordinates: 30°30′41.6″N 85°29′23.7″W

Links
- Public license information: Public file; LMS
- Webcast: Listen Live

WBOE (97.7 FM) is a commercial radio station located in Panama City Beach, Florida, that has its transmitter licensed for Bonifay, Florida, broadcasting to the Panama City area.

== History ==
Originally WTBB (Townsend Broadcasting), it began as a local station in 1983, using mostly a pre-recorded format, and was housed in the old Bank of Bonifay building. Manager Larry Donaldson also carried local ballgames and political events, and had the occasional local remote. Most people thought he owned the station until it sold in 1992 and he moved on.

From 1992 to 1997, the station was known as "Pirate Radio 97.7". Upon the change from WTBB to WYYX, it was renamed "97X".

After WYYX's transmitter was destroyed by a lightning strike on the night of July 31, 2016, its "97X" active rock format was moved to sister WVVE (100.1 FM). On November 2, 2016, WYYX and WVVE swapped call letters for ratings purposes while 97.7 remained silent. On March 15, 2017, 97X returned to WVVE. On March 17, 2017, WVVE changed its call letters back to WYYX, while the original WVVE became WWLY.

From the launch of 97X in 1997, until its 2025 rebrand, its active rock format shifted towards a mainstream rock lean, with classic rock (e.g. Led Zeppelin, Metallica), and mainstream metal interspersed occasionally.

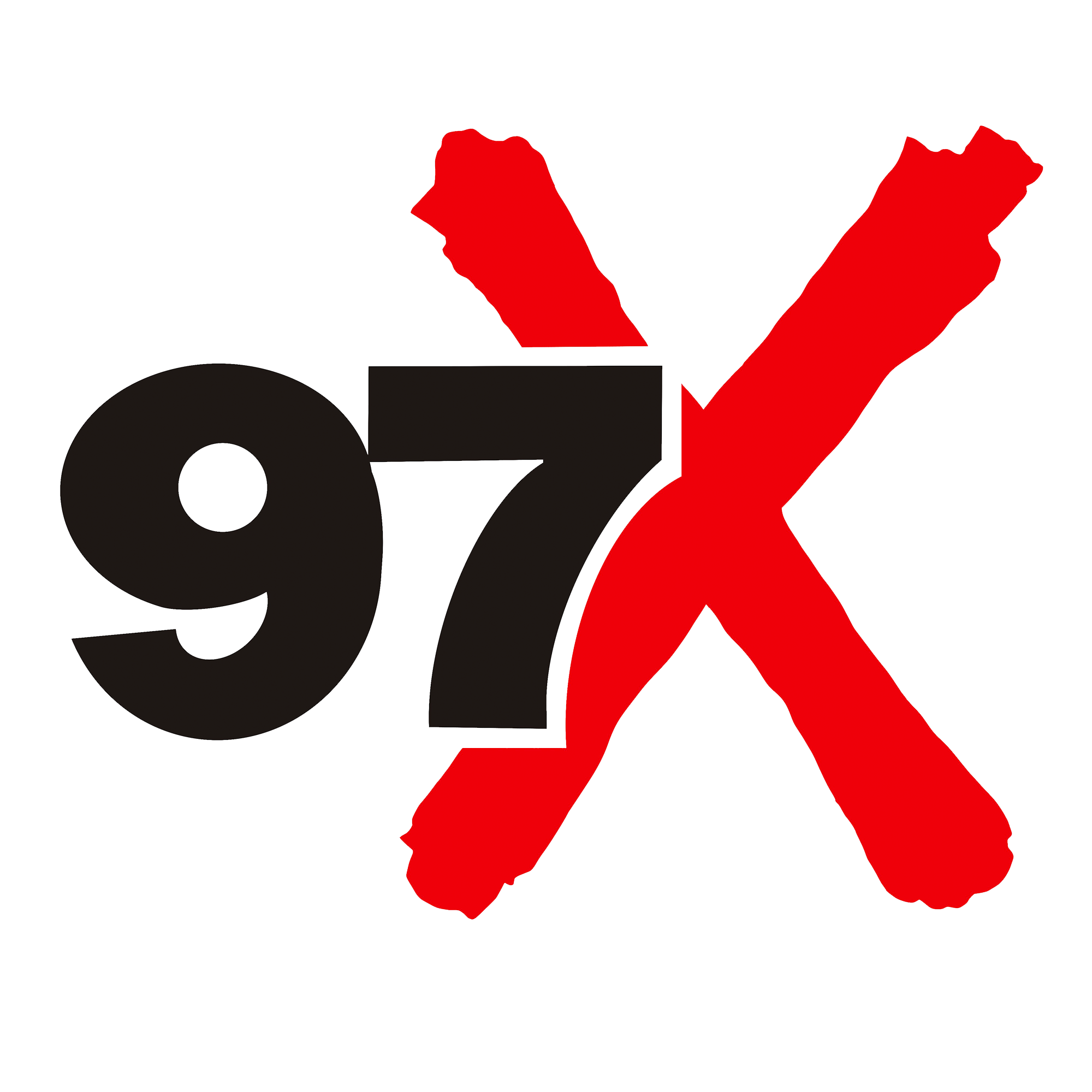
Former logo of WYYX (97X), c. 2017-August 28, 2025.

=== 2025 acquisition by JVC Broadcasting ===
On June 25, 2025, JVC Broadcasting issued a press release to their stations, and to local news outlets, stating that Magic Broadcasting, parent company of WYYX and its sisters WILN, WYOO, and WWLY, were to be absorbed by JVC Broadcasting for US$1.25 million.

On August 29, 2025 at 9:00 AM CDT, just before signing off as 97X for the last time, the station played "Welcome to the Jungle" by Guns 'n' Roses, the first song played upon 97X's launch, and rebranded to listeners as "92.1 and 97.7 The Bone", a simulcast of JVC's WBON in Destin, Florida. On September 1, 2025, the station began airing the call sign WBOE, after requesting a call sign change from the Federal Communications Commission on August 25, 2025. The call sign change was approved on January 7, 2026. The two stations now reach all of the Florida Panhandle and parts of southern Alabama.
