= Richard Neer =

American disc jockey, radio personality, and author

- Born: Richard Michael Neer; April 20, 1949 (age 77); Syracuse, New York, U.S.
- Education: Adelphi University
- Occupations: Radio sports talk-show host, disc jockey, author
- Years active: 1971–present
- Spouse(s): Cynthia Neer (m. 1973; div. 1981); Vicki Neer (m. 1999)

Richard Michael Neer (born April 20, 1949) is an American disc jockey, sports radio personality and author, who has been involved in, and has chronicled, key changes in both music and sports radio.

== Early life and career ==
Born April 20, 1949 in Syracuse, New York, Neer is the eldest of four children born to and Frances Gloria (née Lapenta) and Francis Orville Neer. He attended St. Luke's High School in Ho-Ho-Kus, New Jersey, graduating in 1966, then began his radio career as a student at Adelphi University (class of 1970). He worked at Long Island, New York's WLIR, where he was one of the early adopters of the freeform or progressive rock radio format.

In 1971, Neer joined the airstaff of progressive rock radio powerhouse WNEW-FM in New York City, where he worked as a disc jockey, doing mornings for eight years over three different eras. He was also program director for five years. For a while, Neer had a friendly relationship with Bruce Springsteen, who would call in to his late-night show, and played a part in bringing Springsteen's music to a wider audience. He witnessed the growth of the format and then its gradual shift into a more rigid, programmed, classic rock-driven product, a transformation he described in his 2001 book FM: The Rise and Fall of Rock Radio.

Concurrently, Neer began working as a sports radio talk show host at New York station WNEW-AM in 1987 and then at WFAN in 1988. WFAN was the first and most visible of the successful all-sports format radio stations. Neer broadcast on the last day of music at WNEW-FM in 1999, then returned to that station for a bit after its switch to a "hot talk" format replacing the "Sports Guys" sports talk show hosting "Sports in the Morning—powered by the FAN" up until the time the station started stunting CHR before its flip to Blink.

Neer remains at WFAN doing sports talk, working Saturday mornings and some nights. His call-in show was where Mets fans registered disapproval of the team's decision to run ads targeted at Latinos. He hosted New York Giants NFL broadcasts for several years.

Neer's unemotional style of speaking has prompted Bob Raissman, sports media reporter for the New York Daily News, to refer to Neer as "Sir Sominex," suggesting that his delivery is soporific.

In 2014, Neer published his first mystery novel, entitled Something of the Night. He published his second novel, The Master Builders, on May 17, 2016. He released The Last Resort in May 2017.

== Personal life ==
Neer's brother Dan Neer is also a disc jockey.

From at least 1974 to 1981, Neer was married to fellow Adelphi alumnus and stage actress Cynthia Neer. In April 1999, he married Victoria "Vicky" Pomerance.

== Selected books ==
- Neer, Richard. FM: The Rise and Fall of Rock Radio. Villard, 2001. ISBN 0-679-46295-3.
- Neer, Richard. Something of the Night, Amazon/Kindle eBook. 2014. ASIN B00MS8R14U
- Neer, Richard. The Master Builders, Amazon/Kindle eBook. 2016. ASIN B01FKI3RNS
- Neer, Richard (2017-05-11). The Last Resort: A Riley King Mystery. CreateSpace Independent Publishing Platform. ISBN 978-1541230330.
