= WHWY =

Radio station in Holt–Fort Walton Beach, Florida

- Holt, Florida; United States
- Broadcast area: Fort Walton Beach area
- Frequency: 98.1 MHz
- Branding: Highway 98

Programming
- Format: Country music

Ownership
- Owner: JVC Media; (JVC Mergeco, LLC)
- Sister stations: WBON, WWAV, WZLB

History
- Former call signs: WWSF (1989–1989); WWSF-FM (1989–1994) WXCR (1994–1989); WWSF (1989–1989); WTKE (1999–2006); WTKE-FM (2006–2009)
- Call sign meaning: "Highway"

Technical information
- Licensing authority: FCC
- Facility ID: 56374
- Class: C1
- ERP: 100,000 watts
- HAAT: 147 meters
- Transmitter coordinates: 30°24′38.00″N 86°37′22.00″W

Links
- Public license information: Public file; LMS
- Webcast: Listen live
- Website: www.highway98country.com

WHWY (98.1 FM, "Highway 98") is a radio station with a country music format, licensed to Holt, Florida, and serving the Fort Walton Beach area. WHWY is owned by JVC Broadcasting.

== Call sign history ==
The station was granted call sign WWSF on January 1, 1989. On August 4, 1989, the station changed its call sign to WWSF-FM, again on October 24, 1994 to WXCR, on October 2, 1995 to WWSF, on March 1, 1999 to WTKE, and on November 16, 2009 to WRKN. The station became WHWY in November 2009.

== Station history ==
The station switched to an all-sports format in February 1998 while owned by Capstar Broadcasting. Ownership changed to AMFM, Inc. and Chancellor Media. When the merger between AM/FM and Clear Channel was completed, WTKE-FM remained with Clear Channel while the other stations in the AM/FM group were spun off first into a trust, then to Pamal Broadcasting, Ltd.

In 2002, Clear Channel agreed to a swap with Star Broadcasting, Inc. which resulted in WTKE-FM going to Star in exchange for WQYZ in Biloxi, Mississippi. Star Broadcasting took ownership in 2003, before agreeing to sell the station to Qantum Communications in 2004. A later deal between Star and Cumulus Broadcasting was not executed. The sale to Qantum was completed in November 2009.

logo as WTKE

The original lineup consisted of JT The Brick overnight, John and Johnny in the Mornings, The Fabulous Sports Babe in the mid-morning, The Jim Rome Show in mid-day, a re-broadcast of The Fabulous Sports Babe in the afternoon, Conference Call in the afternoon drive followed by ESPN Gamenight in the evening. In 2006, 1400 AM changed their call sign to WTKE and started simulcasting "98.1 The Ticket", this lasted until November 2008 when the station changed their call sign to WZFN and started broadcasting separate Sports programming as "1400 Z Fan".

On Monday, November 9, 2009, Qantum Communications took ownership of WTKE. On November 11, 2009, the station began stunting with a 24-hour Christmas music format. On January 1, 2010, WTKE then began stunting with a loop of "New Year's Day" by U2 throughout the entire day. After the stunt concluded the day afterward, the station became "Highway 98" with a country music format.

As of December 21, 2011, the station has been bought out by Apex Broadcasting, which includes the sale of all sister stations in the Ft Walton Beach market.

Apex Broadcasting sold WHWY – along with sister stations WECQ, WWAV, and WZLB — to Community Broadcasters effective December 1, 2016, at a purchase price of $5.9 million.

On December 22, 2020, Community Broadcasters sold the entire Fort Walton Beach cluster to JVC Broadcasting for almost $2.3 million, which later closed on February 1, 2021.
