= WHGV =

Radio station in LaCrosse, Florida

WHGV and WCYZ
WHGV: Gainesville, Florida; WCYZ: Ocala, Florida; United States
- Frequencies: WHGV: 99.5 MHz (HD Radio); WCYZ: 99.7 MHz
- Branding: WHGV: Hot 95.9; WCYZ: Z88.3

Programming
- Format: WHGV: Christian hip hop; WCYZ: Christian adult contemporary
- Subchannels: WHGV: HD2: WCYZ simulcast

Ownership
- Owner: Z Ministries, Inc.; (Central Florida Educational Foundation, Inc.)

History
- First air date: WHGV: 1999; WCYZ: 2014
- Former call signs: WHGV: WBEQ (1998); WWFX (1998–1999); WQVR (1999); WRKG (1999); WBXY (1999–2014); WGMW (2014–2022); WCYZ: WGMA (2013–2022)
- Call sign meaning: WHGV: Hot Gainesville; WCYZ: "Cathy", named for volunteer/employee

Technical information
- Licensing authority: FCC
- Facility ID: WHGV: 76433; WCYZ: 191546
- Class: WHGV: A; WCYZ: A
- ERP: WHGV: 2,200 watts; WCYZ: 2,000 watts
- HAAT: WHGV: 144 meters (472 ft); WCYZ: 174.5 meters (573 ft)
- Transmitter coordinates: WHGV: 29°44′24″N 82°23′11.7″W; WCYZ: 29°10′59.5″N 82°2′17.1″W

Links
- Public license information: WHGV: Public file; LMS; WCYZ: Public file; LMS
- Webcast: Listen live
- Website: WHGV: hot959.com; WCYZ: zradio.com

WHGV (99.5 FM) is a Christian hip hop radio station licensed to Gainesville, Florida

WCYZ (99.7 FM) is a Christian adult contemporary radio station licensed to Ocala, Florida.

== History ==
Prior to June 1, 2013, the then-WBXY programmed a news/talk format as 99.5 The Star. At that time, following the station's sale from Asterisk Communications to JVC Media, it changed to a dance format billed as "Party 99.5," whose direction was patterned after its sister station in Long Island, New York, WPTY. On December 26, 2013, WBXY's dance format moved to WXJZ; the two stations simulcast until January 2014, when JVC announced the sale of WBXY to RDA Broadcast Holdings, LLC. The sale to RDA Broadcast Holdings, at a price of $3.5 million, was consummated on June 3, 2014; on June 4, 2014, RDA flipped WBXY to a simulcast of the then-WGMA, a new adult standards station in Ocala that had signed on at 99.7 in March. WBXY changed its call sign to WGMW on June 5, 2014. WGMW and WGMA changed their format from adult standards to soft adult contemporary on June 6, 2016.

On August 1, 2022, WGMW changed its format to Christian hip hop as a simulcast of WPOZ-HD2, and WGMA changed its format to Christian adult contemporary as a simulcast of WPOZ. Both switches are part of an acquisition by the station's operator Central Florida Educational Association. On September 1, 2022, WGMW changed its call sign to WHGV and WGMA changed its call sign to WCYZ.

Central Florida Educational Foundation closed on the swap for WCYZ and WHGV in September 30, 2022 and owns both stations.
