= WGVR-LP =

- High Springs, Florida; United States
- Broadcast area: Gainesville-Ocala, Florida
- Frequency: 103.3 MHz
- Branding: Oldies 103.3

Programming
- Format: Oldies

Ownership
- Owner: Radio Gainesville, Inc.

History
- First air date: 2014

Technical information
- Licensing authority: FCC
- Facility ID: 197327
- Class: L1
- ERP: 22 watts
- HAAT: 61 meters (200 ft)
- Transmitter coordinates: 29°41′11″N 82°22′37″W

Links
- Public license information: LMS

WGVR-LP was an oldies music radio station broadcasting from Gainesville, Florida as "Oldies 103.3" under the ownership of Radio Gainesville, Inc.

== History ==
In 2014, "Z 103-3" launched with an all 1980s hits format. On May 21, 2018, the station relaunched as "Oldies 103.3", with Scott Shannon's True Oldies Channel; the previous format moved to WYGC (104.9 FM) as "Y105". The change was originally planned to take place on March 19.

Due to the death of Barry Magrill, Radio Gainesville surrendered the station's license to the Federal Communications Commission (FCC) on January 31, 2024. The station signed off on February 6, with its license cancelled that same day. The FCC reinstated the license at the station's request on February 14, 2024.
