= WBLI =

- Patchogue, New York; United States
- Broadcast area: Long Island
- Frequency: 106.1 MHz (HD Radio)
- Branding: 106.1 BLI

Programming
- Language: English
- Format: Contemporary hit radio

Ownership
- Owner: Cox Media Group; (CMG NY/Texas Radio, LLC)
- Sister stations: WBAB; WHFM

History
- First air date: December 13, 1957
- Former call signs: WPAC-FM (1957–1971)
- Call sign meaning: We're the Best on Long Island!

Technical information
- Licensing authority: FCC
- Facility ID: 37235
- Class: B
- ERP: 49,000 watts
- HAAT: 152 meters (499 ft)
- Transmitter coordinates: 40°50′32.4″N 73°2′23.4″W
- Translator: (94.5 MHz) W231CX (Shirley)

Links
- Public license information: Public file; LMS
- Webcast: Listen live
- Website: wbli.com

WBLI (106.1 FM) is a commercial radio station owned by Cox Radio, and licensed to serve Patchogue, New York. It airs a contemporary hit radio format. The station's signal mainly covers Suffolk County, New York on Long Island. Its studios and offices are located on Sunrise Highway (NY 27) in West Babylon, New York.

WBLI is a Class B FM station with an effective radiated power (ERP) of 49,000 watts, the highest powered station on Long Island. To protect two adjacent channel stations from interference, WQXR-FM in Newark, New Jersey and WHCN Hartford, Connecticut (both on 105.9 FM), WBLI uses a directional antenna. The station's transmitter is located in Farmingville, New York.

== History ==
=== Early years ===
The station signed on the air on December 13, 1957, as WPAC-FM, the FM counterpart to WPAC. The two stations were owned by the Patchogue Broadcasting Company. Because WPAC was a daytimer, WPAC-FM simulcast its programming in the daytime and continued it after WPAC signed off the air at sunset.

At first, it was only powered at 7,800 watts on a 115-foot tower, only heard in and around Western Suffolk County. It would take several decades before the station expanded its coverage area.

=== Contemporary hits ===
In January 1971, the station was purchased by Beck-Ross Communications, owner of WGLI in Babylon, New York. The station's call sign was changed to WBLI, and switched to a contemporary hits format as FM 106 WBLI. After Beck-Ross took ownership, the station initially broadcast from a trailer located behind the WPAC building in Medford, New York. In March 1971, WBLI moved to new studios at 31 West Main Street in Patchogue. WBLI's DJ staff has included George Taylor Morris and Al Bandiero.

On September 27, 1985, WBLI's transmission tower was toppled by Hurricane Gloria.

=== Shift to Hot AC ===
By August 1991, with the CHR format on the decline across the country, WBLI evolved into more of a hot adult contemporary format. Steve Harper and news director Ken Rhodes, hosted the morning show. The station often ran special weekend programming, such as the "Almost Made It But Didn't Weekend" and "The Ladies of the 80s Weekend." Musically, the station was slightly hotter than New York City's WPLJ and WMXV.

In March 1994, Beck-Ross Communications was acquired by Liberty Broadcasting, the owners of two other Long Island stations, WGBB and WBAB-FM.

=== Cox ownership ===
Atlanta-based Cox Media acquired the station in 1998. When Cox Radio acquired WBLI, it evolved into a more mainstream CHR with less dance product (though still more than most other CHR's) and a tighter playlist of hits.

In June 2019, Cox announced it would sell the majority interest in its radio stations to Apollo Global Management. The company retained use of the Cox Media name.

== Personalities ==
=== Previous morning shows ===
Steve Harper (later with WKJY) had hosted "'BLI in the AM" for 25 years before being let go in the summer of 2006. Maria Garcia (now an anchor with WCBS New York City) was the co-host since 1998. The show was called "Steve and Maria in the Morning." Maria left in 2005. Dana DiDonato (later with KBZT in San Diego) joined Harper in January 2006. Harper's last show was on July 19, 2006. Dana then assumed hosting duties along with Randy Spears and Drew Appelbaum. Randy and Drew exited the station on December 16, 2010.

On January 10, 2011, the radio station introduced "The New BLI in the Morning," which featured Dana with new co-host Jeffrey Jameson (later with WNEW-FM in New York City) Shawn "Puffy The Producer" Novatt also returned. The show was syndicated to Cox sister station "Hot 100.9" WHTI in Richmond, Virginia, and renamed "Dana and Jeffrey in the Morning" on Monday, June 4, 2012. Syndication ended when WHTI was sold to another owner in June 2013.

Jeffrey Jameson announced he was leaving in December 2013. Jayson Prim (later with KBZT in San Diego) debuted on January 6, 2014.

On June 30, 2016, the station announced on its Facebook page that Dana and Jayson in the Morning had ended its run. It featured Dana DiDonato, Jayson Prim, John Mingione (John Online), Shawn "Puffy The Producer" Novatt, and Ted Lindner with news and traffic.

On July 11, 2016, Cooper Lawrence, formerly of WPLJ, and Anthony Michaels, took over mornings 5:30 - 9am on the station. The show had its last broadcast on September 14, 2018.

=== Controversy ===
On Wednesday, February 27, 2008, Randy of the "BLI in the Morning" show made a remark that offended a caller from Mastic, Long Island. He joked that she lived in a trailer park. After the station received complaints regarding the remarks, and after Randy's refusal to apologize, he was suspended by station management.
