= WBAB =

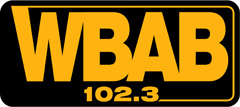
- Babylon, New York; United States
- Broadcast area: Long Island
- Frequency: 102.3 MHz (HD Radio)
- Branding: 102.3 WBAB

Programming
- Format: Classic rock

Ownership
- Owner: Cox Media Group; (CMG NY/Texas Radio, LLC)
- Sister stations: WBLI; WHFM

History
- First air date: August 27, 1958
- Former call signs: WBAB-FM (1958–2003)
- Call sign meaning: Babylon Bay Shore Broadcasting (original owner)

Technical information
- Licensing authority: FCC
- Facility ID: 71199
- Class: A
- ERP: 6,000 watts (analog); 240 watts (digital)
- HAAT: 82 meters (269 ft)
- Transmitter coordinates: 40°47′58.3″N 73°20′6.4″W
- Repeater: 95.3 WHFM (Southampton)

Links
- Public license information: Public file; LMS
- Webcast: Listen live
- Website: www.wbab.com

WBAB (102.3 FM) is a commercial radio station licensed to serve Babylon, New York. It is owned by Cox Radio with studios and offices on Sunrise Highway (New York State Route 27) in West Babylon. Morning duo "Roger & JP" (Roger Luce and John Parise) began hosting the morning show in January 2000. WBAB and sister station WHFM (95.3 FM, licensed to Southampton) simulcast a classic rock radio format for Long Island.

WBAB has an effective radiated power (ERP) of 6,000 watts; its transmitter is on South Service Road off the Long Island Expressway (Interstate 495) in Dix Hills. WBAB's signal covers Western Suffolk County and part of Nassau County, while WHFM's signal covers Long Island's East End.

== History ==
=== Top 40, album rock, classic rock ===
The station signed on the air on August 27, 1958, as WBAB-FM. In its early years, it simulcast WBAB (1440 AM). Because the AM station was a daytimer, WBAB-FM could continue its programming in the evening, when the AM station had to go silent. The stations were owned by Bay Shore Broadcasting. At the time, WBAB-FM was powered at only 670 watts, a fraction of its current output.

In the 1970s, the stations had a Top 40 format. In September 1975, the simulcast ended. AM 1440 adopted a Gospel music format as WNYG. WBAB-FM shifted its focus to an album rock sound. By the early 2000s, WBAB began concentrating on the top rock songs of the 1960s, 70s and 80s, becoming a classic rock station.

=== 2006 signal hijacking ===
On the morning of Wednesday, May 17, 2006, the station suffered a broadcast signal intrusion that lasted for approximately 90 seconds. During that time, the hijacker broadcast the song "Nigger Hatin' Me" by the 1960s-era white supremacist country music singer Johnny Rebel.

Roger Luce, the station's morning host, said at the time, "I've never seen this in 22 years at this radio station... Whatever that was - it was very racist." The next morning, it made the front page of Newsday with the headline "JACKED FM". The station's new general manager, John Shea, said, "I've only been here a week and we get hijacked." Former program director John Olsen said, "This was not some child's prank, this was a federal offense."

The hijack was likely accomplished by overpowering the studio transmitter link (STL) signal to the transmitter in Dix Hills, New York. A signal hijacking with the same song happened to WBAB's sister station WBLI (106.1 FM) about two weeks earlier.

== Discography ==
- WBAB Homegrown Album (1981)
- WBAB Son of Homegrown (1984)
