= Ben Manilla =

American broadcaster (1952–2024)

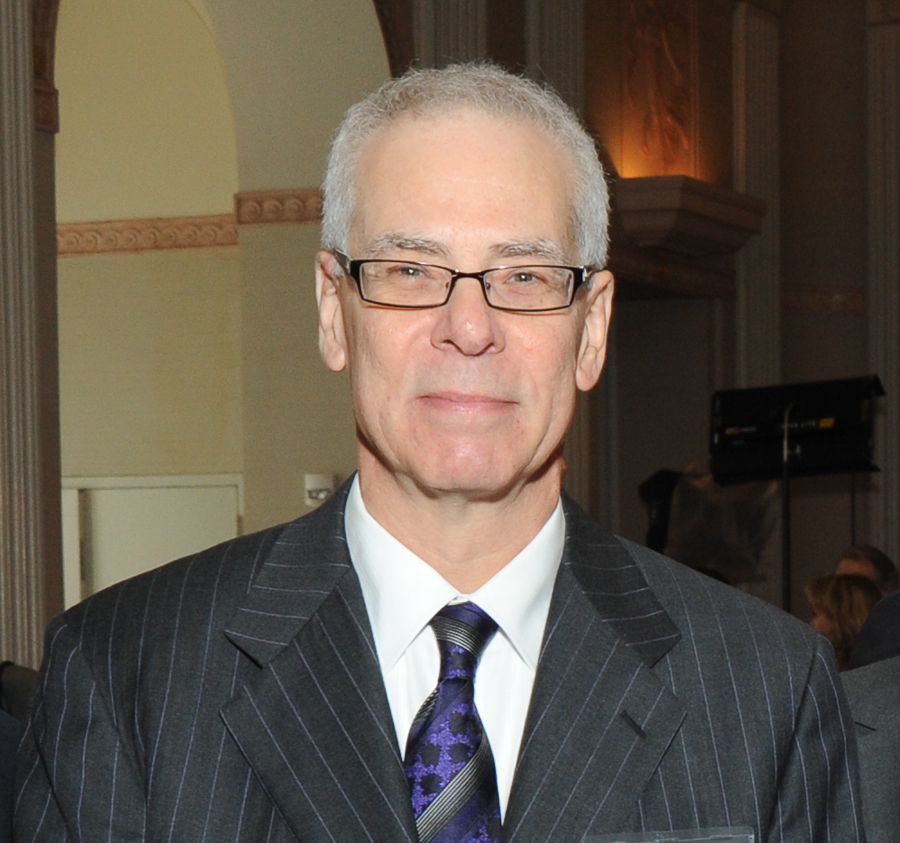
Manilla in 2013

Ben Manilla (December 8, 1952 – September 30, 2024) was an American broadcaster, audio producer, and teacher. He produced and directed award-winning radio programs. His work in the late 1970s included the alternative news features, News Blimps, and music documentaries for WLIR, where he was production director and on-air personality.

In the 1980s, Manilla created news documentaries for WOR-AM, and helped develop programs at Radio Today, New York, including Flashback, Rock Stars with Timothy White, and Radio MTV.

In 1991, he moved to San Francisco and started Ben Manilla Productions which created national radio series including The House of Blues Radio Hour with Dan Aykroyd (with whom Manilla co-wrote the book Elwood's Blues: Interviews with the Blues Legends & Stars), Philosophy Talk with Stanford University, The Loose Leaf Book Company with Tom Bodett (syndicated to 227 stations with an audience of 250,000), and The Sounds of American Culture on National Public Radio's All Things Considered, which evolved into Inside the National Recording Registry on Studio 360, and ultimately The Sounds of America on 1A, where it is currently broadcast.

In 2003, BMP with Martin Scorsese and the Experience Music Project helped lead a nation-wide, multimedia event called The Blues. The year-long initiative included BMP’s thirteen-hour radio documentary, The Blues with Keb’ Mo’, which became the most widely distributed special in the history of PRI. The series was also broadcast across Canada, the United Kingdom, New Zealand, and Australia. In addition to the radio series, The Blues included: a 7-hour PBS TV series overseen by Martin Scorsese; educational outreach and curriculum; two web sites; a companion book from Harper-Collins; DVDs and more than 25 music CDs, a concert tour, a concert film, and a traveling museum exhibit.

BMP also helped develop and produce podcasts such as The Science of Happiness, Voices in the Hall, Masters of Scale, and The Hash.

Manilla's awards include a Peabody Award, for Inside the National Recording Registry in 2012, Columbia University's Edward Howard Armstrong Award, the 2003 International Radio Festival Grand Award, Billboard magazine's Best Syndicated Radio Show, four Grand Awards, plus multiple golds, silvers, bronzes and honorable mentions from the New York Festivals International Radio Awards, first place award from Ohio State Public Service Broadcasting, first place Scripps Howard Award, three first place Music Journalism Awards, first place Local and National Awards from Associated Press, first place Local and National Awards from United Press International, first place Award from the Radio and TV News Directors Association, two Blues Foundation Awards (Keeping the Blues Alive and WC Handy Award, the Blues Music Association's A.G.E.S. Award, a Golden Reel and two Silver Reels from the National Federation of Community Broadcasters, and the RTNDA Edward R. Murrow Award.

In 2003, Ben formed the multi-platform production and consulting company Media Mechanics with broadcast veterans Mike Henry and Paul Marszalek.

From 2005-2019, Manilla has been an instructor at UC Berkeley Graduate School of Journalism where he taught Radio News Reporting, and was the Academic Coordinator for Audio.

In June 2024 the Library of Congress acquired the House of Blues Radio Hour archive, spanning 20 years’ worth of radio programs, performances and nearly 2,000 original interviews showcasing and celebrating Blues music and adjacent genres.

Manilla was born in 1952 to James Nicholson Manilla and Margarita Fernandez Manilla. He grew up in New York City and attended New York University, where he graduated with a drama degree. Manilla died from cancer on September 30, 2024, at the age of 71.
