= Chaz & AJ =

Morning radio program in Connecticut, US

Chaz & AJ in the Morning is a morning radio talk show program on 99.1 WPLR, a rock radio station broadcasting from Milford, Connecticut weekdays from 5:30–10 am. Though the show is mostly comedy based, it includes certain segments of more serious (and more important) things, including interviews with politicians and authors. Chaz & AJ won the 2016 NAB Marconi Award for Medium Market Personality of the year, a highly distinguished honor in the radio community. The show has won the New Haven Advocate award for best local radio show every single year for the past ten years.

The show is done primarily by Chaz and AJ (who don't use their last names to protect their privacy when they aren't working), Ruth, and current show producer Phil. AJ does the weather and Phil does the traffic report and handles all duties regarding the overall production for the show.

Former regular participants included Megan Doll, who did the traffic and news, but also took part in many segments; John, the former show producer; and Billy Winn, a local comic who was laid off March 2009.

The show began on WPLR on February 17, 2003, after the previous show, Smith & Barber, ended, moving from WRCN on Long Island. Chaz had previously been a night jock at WPLR. In 2007, Connecticut Magazine named the show "Best Local Radio Morning-Drive DJs", saying "If FM radio is going to hold off its satellite competition, ... it's the ability of the on-air personnel to connect with the audience. Chaz and AJ seem to be doing that very well."

== Format ==
The show is usually "played by ear." A topic mentioned by "The Tribe" (the name given to Chaz & AJ listeners) may be discussed for an hour on the show even though it wasn't planned when the show began.

=== Interviews ===
Chaz & AJ normally have interviews with both local Connecticut talent and people known around the world. Some people featured on the show are Connecticut congressmen, sports figures, musicians, local news anchors, and much more.

A rather notable interview was with actor James Brolin on September 11, 2007, who made the news after Chaz and AJ noted it was the sixth anniversary of the 9/11 attacks, and Brolin replied "Right, oh, yeah, Happy 9/11!"

Amusing moments with some famous people have occurred, such as when then-Vice President Joe Biden was on the phone and called Chaz "Chad". Chaz politely corrected him, to which the Veep just chuckled. Another moment was in 2016 when then-presidential candidate Donald Trump called into the show. The phone number he called was not being monitored by former Traffic Girl Pam as it should have been, and Trump's voice message was used many times by Chaz for comic relief.

Recurring Guests

- Jimmy Koplik, Live Nation concert booker
- Joe Meyers, movie critic
- Upcoming performers at the Hartford Healthcare Amphitheater

=== Regular segments ===
- AJ's Top 10: At the start of the show, AJ has a Top 10 list that is inspired by current events. Listeners call in to guess.
- Stump the Chumps: At 9:30 every morning listeners call in with general knowledge questions and anyone on the show that day can help them guess the answer- if no one gets it right then the listener is put into the running for whatever prize is offered that week- usually concert tickets.
- Dumb@** News: Everyday at 7:20 & 9:20. The crew discusses some of the dumbest people in the world that made the news.
- Boss Keith's Top-5: Friday at 9:35. Keith D., boss of Chaz and AJ, rants about his Top-5 of whatever is on his mind. Usually personal and self-deprecating.
