= WSWN =

Radio station in Florida, United States

- Belle Glade, Florida; United States
- Frequency: 900 kHz
- Branding: Gospel in the Glades

Programming
- Format: Gospel
- Affiliations: CBS News Radio

Ownership
- Owner: (Sugar Broadcasting, Inc.)
- Sister stations: WBGF

History
- First air date: October 5, 1947

Technical information
- Licensing authority: FCC
- Facility ID: 59660
- Class: D
- Power: 1,000 watts day 22 watts night
- Transmitter coordinates: 26°42′43.00″N 80°40′59.00″W
- Translator: 107.1 W296DN (Belle Glade)

Links
- Public license information: Public file; LMS

WSWN (900 AM) is a radio station that broadcast a talk-show format branded as "Talk of the Palm Beaches." It is better known in the South Florida and Treasure Coast areas as "Sugar 900," named after the surrounding sugar cane industry in the Belle Glade and Pahokee areas. The station is licensed to serve 18 counties across South Florida, the United States, and the Caribbean.

The station was last owned by Sylna Leger-Brazile, through licensee Sugar Broadcasting, Inc. By day, WSWN broadcasts at 1,000 watts. At night, the station reduces power to 22 watts to avoid interference as 900 AM is a Mexican/Canadian Clear Channel Frequency reserved for XEW Mexico City and CKBI Prince Albert, Saskatchewan.

== History ==
WSWN signed on as a daytime-only station October 5, 1947, broadcasting on 900 kHz with 1 kW power. Owned by Seminole Broadcasting Company and licensed to Belle Glade, it was initially known as "The Mighty Ninety" (the same as Seminole's WEAS in Savannah, Georgia). This was because most radios of the time did not include the last zero of the frequency on their dial displays. Thanks to the stations' overlapping signals, Dee Rivers (owner and operator of Seminole), branded both with the same positioning and ID's. This effectively provided car based listeners with a continuous experience from Central Florida to Southern Georgia.

After winning FCC approval to go to a 24-hour broadcast schedule, WSWN became known as the "Little Station with the Long Reach" for its ability to be heard as far away as Charleston and Mobile from dusk till dawn, despite the fact that its paltry 1,000 watts could scarcely be heard in West Palm Beach during the day. Over the years attempts at raising power were blocked due to signal overlap issues with WMOP 900 AM in the Gainesville-Ocala, Florida area. With its fate virtually sealed as a local-only station during the day, the 1970s saw even its nighttime listenership erode with the emergence of country music powerhouses like WQAM in Miami and WIRK in West Palm Beach.

In the 1980s, an experienced black PD named Joe Fisher was permitted to change the format to what was at the time referred to as R&B, with a strong emphasis on Black Gospel for 18 hours a day. The station would retain its Southern Gospel morning show. Rivers' declining radio station in Savannah, Georgia had previously carried an exclusively R&B format from the late 1940s until 1960, when it switched to a country music format. However, due to popular demand R&B was eventually reintroduced in the late-night hours, as hosted by "Nat The Cat," who played a variety of R&B music until the early 80s. His segment and time slot became affectionately referred to as Nat the Cat with Hot Butter Soul. This segment also ran for a time at WSWN in Belle Glade, prompting some to regard Nat as the "First Black DJ of the Glades".

Since the early 1960s, the host of WSWN Southern Gospel morning show was Jimmy Sims. By the 1980s he'd become known to many as "Reverend Sims," though he was never formally ordained.

Joe Fisher positioned WSWN with the moniker: 'Sugar 900' (pronounced Suga900), a reference to the number one industry in the Glades—sugarcane farming and processing. Using professional imaging and good talent, which at times sounded world-class, he was able to create a "slick" image. Additionally weekend and most especially Sunday Morning programming had been left open for Black Gospel. This was lucrative due to ministries both near and far anxious to purchase air-time.

Meanwhile, Belle Glade's lone FM frequency (93.5), purchased by Rivers' in 1965 and left dark for over a decade, was being prepared to assume the Country format. Power was 10,000 watts broadcast from a 420 ft. tower, the maximum permitted due to its close proximity to an airport and overlap issues with similar frequencies in Vero Beach and Key Largo. Once again, a Belle Glade station was relegated to "local-only" status. It finally went on the air as WSWN-FM on October 10, 1978. Rivers' plans to boost the signal of WSWN-FM to appeal to Hispanic audiences in Cuba were stymied due to the station's ineffective radiation pattern. Forced to continue broadcasting or lose the frequency, Rivers introduced a 24-hour Country format on 93.5 FM. On June 19, 1989, the station changed its call sign to the current WBGF.

== The 90's ==
By 1996 both stations had been on the block for several years. Anxious to retire, Marie Rivers accepted an offer made by 2 partners from New York calling themselves Atlas News & Information Service, Inc. David Lampel was the hands-on "radio man" who had worked his way to PD and later GM at WLIB in New York City then to Senior Vice President of the station's parent, Inner City Broadcasting Corporation. Michael Wach was a sales and administration specialist with Wall Street and Madison Avenue connections, who had served as vice president and general manager of WLNY-TV on Long Island and held executive positions with WPIX-TV in New York and Boston's WHDH-TV. Together, Lampel and Wach had already purchased a television station and several radio stations in the Virgin Islands and Puerto Rico. Now, WBGF/WSWN would be united with a 100,000 watt FM in Islamorada under the name BGI Broadcasting.

BGI's first move was to flip WBGF-FM to the Hot New Country format offered by Jones Radio, brand it "Big Dawg Country" and launch a live/local morning show hosted by Dave Hazzard a.k.a. "Cousin Dave." The WSWN-AM format remained largely untouched, but eventually the air staff were let go. Henceforth, 6P-6A would be satellite automated featuring the Urban Gold format from ABC Networks. Saturday was live Gospel from 6-10 a.m., then automated until Sunday when live Gospel aired from 6 a.m. to at least 6 p.m. and sometimes later, depending on how much airtime had been sold. The patented Phil Haire method was embraced, and was in fact given new life with the prospect of offering customers more coverage via simulcast to other properties.

In 1998 Michael Wach sold his interest in Atlas News & Information Service to become vice president and general manager at WNYW/FOX 5-TV in New York, the Fox Network's flagship station. This left Lampel as majority shareholder, if not outright owner. As he had directed operations thus far anyway, there were no new changes. More employees were dismissed until, by 1999 the entire staff of both stations combined (sales, administration and "on air") consisted of only 7 or 8 individuals.

== The 2000s ==
By 2000 the decision was made to swap studios. The more successful WSWN-AM would be moved to the larger WBGF-FM studio which had been improved years before. FM would now occupy the less prominent quarters in the back of the same building.

The stations continued under the ownership of Atlas News & Information, Inc./BGI Broadcasting—which soon relocated from New York to Las Vegas. WSWN remained a Gospel station, but WBGF eventually abandoned Jones and ABC Networks' in favor of a Mexican Regional format produced in-house. Intended to service the ethnic sharecroppers of the Belle Glade area, where the demographic had long since shifted from primarily African American/Caribbean-based to Latin/Mexican-based, 93.5 WBGF became known as "Radio Lobo."

Phil Haire died in April 2006. Mike D'Augustine was appointed to succeed Haire.

(History based on information provided by Dave Hazzard of West Palm Beach, Florida. Official dates and technical info, along with supplemental history on "Nat the Cat" and “Radio Lobo” programming provided by Mark Tillery of Ocala, Florida).

== 2014 to 2017 ==
Then, on September 29, 2014, WSWN "Sugar 900" was no more, as the station was purchased by JVC Broadcasting of New York—along with WSWN FM sister station, WBGF 93.5. Retaining its call letters, WSWN flipped to brokered and satellite talk as "The Talk of the Palm Beaches," and carried a live and local morning news and talk program hosted by local radio mainstays Gerard Campbell (formerly of WFTL 850 AM "News Talk") and Lindy Rome (of Sunny 104.3 FM). WBGF 93.5 dumped the regional Mexican programming and became "93.5 The Bar" with an Alternative Active Rock format and carried the controversial and syndicated "Bubba the Love Sponge" radio program.

By May 19, 2017, ANCO Media Group purchased WBGF 93.5 and rebranded it as a dance rock format, "Revolution 93.5" creating a mini-South Florida radio network—mirroring a station the Keys, and two FM translators, one in Dade and one in Broward County.

By November 2017, JVC Media co-founder Vic Canales, in a pair of deals worth a combined $751,111, sold his ownership position in the company. Canales—better known by his on-air name "Vic Latino"—stuck a deal to swap his stake in the nine-year-old company for a trio of signals. Canales exchanged his shares worth a combined $450,000 for oldies WSVU (960) and two translators: the North Palm Beach, FL-licensed translator W240CI at 95.5 FM and the Jupiter, FL-licensed translator W295BJ at 106.9 FM. Together the three signals were/are branded as "True Oldies Channel 95.9-106.9." Once the deal closed, JVC Media continued to own and operate WSWN 900 AM.

By December 1, 2017, WSWN 900 discontinued its network satellite, time brokered catch-all of health, legal, financial, and entertainment infomercial programming as "The Talk of the Palm Beaches" and returned to 24-hour brokered black gospel programming as the "New Sugar 900." Now, during its unsold airtime, it ran black gospel music as its filler programming. The station brought back Sugar 900's multi award winning morning show host, Pastor Albert L. Polk IV a.k.a. “Church Boy," with his 6 to 10 am weekday morning show and Gospel radio veteran Dawn Brady who first made her voice heard to Sugar 900 listeners in 2008. Pastor “Church Boy” is very popular in the Glades community, his voice is prominent among the church and political communities of the western region in Palm Beach County. The broadcast industry publications Radio and Television Business Report, All Access, Radio Insight confirmed the sale of WSWN 900 AM to James Leger's Sugar Broadcasting.

Meanwhile 93.5 WBGF is currently owned by Marco Mazzoli, a popular Italian/Milan-based radio personality.

Effective August 10, 2018, JVC Media sold WSWN to Sugar Broadcasting, Inc. for $125,000.
