= UltraMix (Ultra Records album series) =

Compilation album series

UltraMix was a series of 1-disc mixed dance compilation albums released by Ultra Records, focusing on commercially popular songs of the year as well as songs from Ultra Records, with the later entries focusing more on the latter. The series ran from 2008-2018 and released 10 entries with 1-6 getting a physical CD release and 7-10 only released digitally or for streaming. Like most Ultra Records compilations until 2017, the series was also known for the attractive women that grace the album covers, with Angelina @ Images as the initial 2008 release cover model.

== Releases ==
- Ultra.Mix - Vic Latino (September 23, 2008)
- UltraMix 2 - Vic Latino (September 22, 2009)
- UltraMix 3 (March 6, 2010)
- UltraMix 4 (March 29, 2011)
- UltraMix 5 (September 17, 2013)
- UltraMix 6 - Dan D-Noy (May 20, 2014)
- UltraMix 7 (July 24, 2015) (digital only)
- UltraMix 8 (2016) (digital only)
- UltraMix 9 (April 28, 2017) (digital only)
- UltraMix 10 (August 3, 2018) (digital only)
