= WDRE (AM) =

Operating under special temporary authority
- Riverhead, New York; United States
- Broadcast area: Eastern Long Island
- Frequency: 1570 kHz

Programming
- Language: English
- Format: Dance radio

Ownership
- Owner: JVC Broadcasting; (JVC Media LLC)
- Sister stations: WBZO; WJVC; WLIM; WPTY; WRCN-FM

History
- First air date: August 8, 1963
- Former call signs: WAPC (1963–1967); WHRF (1967–1974); WRCN (1974–1982); WRHD (1983–1990); WRHZ (1990); WRHD (1990–1999); WFOG (1999–2001); WFTU (2001–2024); WBZO (2024–2025)

Technical information
- Licensing authority: FCC
- Facility ID: 18238
- Class: B
- Power: 1,000 watts (daytime); 500 watts (night)
- Transmitter coordinates: 40°54′48.4″N 72°39′14.3″W
- Translator: 104.9 W285FX (Riverhead)

Links
- Public license information: Public file; LMS
- Website: www.pulse87ny.com

WDRE (1570 AM) is a radio station licensed to serve Riverhead, New York. The station is owned and operated by JVC Broadcasting.

== History ==
WDRE began as top 40 WAPC on August 8, 1963, to continue the signal of WPAC (1580 AM) to the east. It would later become WHRF as "Wharf Radio" and then the AM side of WRCN-FM in 1974 as WRCN.

=== Five Towns College (2001–2024) ===
The station occasionally broadcast live music performances from the Dix Hills Center for the Performing Arts and the other performance venues on the college campus. It also had a program called "Theatre of the Air," where students re-enacted the old days of radio through old radio dramas. The first of these events had so many on-line listeners, the station's server crashed.

The station briefly went silent in January 2017 and resumed operations in January 2018.

As of 2026, WDRE and 104.9 W285FX began simulcasting Pulse 87.
