= WBON (FM) =

Radio station in Destin, Florida

Coordinates: 30°24′38″N 86°37′22″W

- Destin, Florida; United States
- Broadcast area: Fort Walton Beach–Emerald Coast
- Frequency: 92.1 MHz
- Branding: 92.1 & 97.7 The Bone

Programming
- Format: AOR/Mainstream Rock

Ownership
- Owner: JVC Media; (JVC Mergeco, LLC)
- Sister stations: WHWY, WWAV, WZLB, WYYX

History
- First air date: 1981; 45 years ago
- Former call signs: WMMK (1981–2004); WWRK (2004–2005); WFFY (2005–2012); WECQ (2012–2025)
- Call sign meaning: "Bone"

Technical information
- Licensing authority: FCC
- Facility ID: 19475
- Class: C3
- ERP: 19,000 watts
- HAAT: 115 meters (377 ft)

Links
- Public license information: Public file; LMS
- Webcast: Listen live
- Website: wbonfm.com

WBON (92.1 MHz) is a commercial radio station licensed to Destin, Florida, and serving Fort Walton Beach and the Emerald Coast. Owned and operated by JVC Broadcasting, it features an AOR/Mainstream Rock radio format. The Bone's format is a vary wide range of rock with thousands of songs from new rock to blues classic. Many of the rock songs featured on The Bone cannot be heard on any other FM station. The Bone regularly features live concerts on holiday weekends with 'The Bone's Holiday Concerts That Rock'. On-air host include Matt Stone, Mary Jo, Roxy, Eddy RBG, Ski and Mallory. The station features Hair Rock on Friday's with Big Hair Friday.

WBON has an effective radiated power (ERP) of 19,000 watts, its transmitter is off Hollywood Boulevard NW in Fort Walton Beach.

== History ==
The station signed on the air in 1981 as WMMK. In 2004, the call sign changed to WWRK, and changed again the following year to WFFY. The station has served the area as a Rhythmic Top 40 station since then, at first branded as "Fly 92.1". On December 21, 2011, station owner Quantum Broadcasting sold its stations in the Ft. Walton Beach market, including WFFY, to Apex Broadcasting. On February 17, 2012, at 5 pm CST after playing "Stay Fly" by Three 6 Mafia, Apex dropped the Fly 92.1 branding and relaunched WFFY as CHR "Q92", with Kelly Clarkson's Stronger the first song played. The call sign was later changed to WECQ to reflect the change in branding.

Apex Broadcasting sold WECQ – along with sister stations WHWY, WWAV, and WZLB — to Community Broadcasters effective December 1, 2016, at a purchase price of $5.9 million.

On December 22, 2020, Community Broadcasters sold the entire Fort Walton Beach cluster to JVC Broadcasting for almost $2.3 million, which later closed on February 1, 2021.

On December 20, 2024, at 10 am, WECQ rebranded as "92.1 The Bone"; launching with 9000 songs commercial free. Jimi Hendrix's Star Spangled Banner launched the Bone. The first hour also featured: Saliva, Ladies and Gentlemen, Metallica's cover of Tuesday's Gone, Bob Rivers, I Am Santa Claus, Black Label Society, Stillborn, Ramones, Sheena Is A Punk Rocker, Rammstein, Highly Suspect, Porno For Pyros, Highly Suspect and Spiderbait. the station changed its call sign to WBON effective January 27, 2025.

On August 29th at 9am The Bone went commercial free again to welcome new listeners from Panama City Beach and Dothan, AL. "Fort Walton Beach rocker 92.1 The Bone (WBON) into Panama City with a simulcast on WYYX’s 97.7 FM. To mark the move, The Bone is stunting ten days of commercial-free music through September 7, with a full talent lineup debuting September 8." https://radioink.com/2025/08/29/jvc-broadcasting-brings-the-bone-to-panama-city-boots-97x/
