= WZLB =

- Valparaiso, Florida; United States
- Broadcast area: Fort Walton Beach, Florida
- Frequency: 103.1 MHz
- Branding: Florida Man Radio

Programming
- Format: Hot talk
- Affiliations: Compass Media Networks

Ownership
- Owner: JVC Media; (JVC Mergeco, LLC)
- Sister stations: WBON, WHWY, WWAV

History
- First air date: November 1974; 51 years ago
- Former call signs: WQUH (1974–1992); WLGH (1992–1994); WMXZ (1994–2012)
- Call sign meaning: "ZLB" = "Blaze" reversed (previous branding)

Technical information
- Licensing authority: FCC
- Facility ID: 60811
- Class: C2
- ERP: 50,000 watts
- HAAT: 147 meters
- Transmitter coordinates: 30°30′53.00″N 86°13′12.00″W
- Repeater: 102.3 WXUS-HD3 (Dunnellon)

Links
- Public license information: Public file; LMS
- Webcast: Listen live
- Website: floridamanradio.com

WZLB (103.1 FM) is a radio station broadcasting a hot talk radio format. Licensed to Valparaiso, Florida, the station serves the Ft. Walton Beach area.

== History ==
The station went on the air as WQUH in November 1974. On April 1, 1992, WQUH shifted from Smooth Jazz to Adult Contemporary WLGH, then to Top 40 as WMXZ on March 31, 1994. On March 2, 2012, WMXZ changed their format to rock, branded as "103.1 The Blaze". On March 14, 2012, WMXZ changed their call letters to WZLB. As of December 21, 2011, Quantum sold its stations to Apex Broadcasting in Ft Walton Beach.

Apex Broadcasting sold WZLB – along with sister stations WECQ, WHWY, and WWAV — to Community Broadcasters effective December 1, 2016, at a purchase price of $5.9 million.

On September 1, 2019, the station went off the air for around 24 hours and the following day on the 2nd, WZLB rebranded with a new name called 103.1 The Shark and a new format to newer classic rock.

On December 22, 2020, Community Broadcasters sold the entire Fort Walton Beach cluster to JVC Broadcasting for almost $2.3 million, which later closed on February 1, 2021. JVC Media announced that WZLB has flipped to its Florida Man Radio talk format on March 1, 2021.
