= WXUS =

Radio station in Dunnellon, Florida

Coordinates: 29.188°N 82.394°W

- Dunnellon, Florida; United States
- Broadcast area: Ocala, Florida
- Frequency: 102.3 MHz (HD Radio)
- Branding: U.S. 102.3

Programming
- Format: Country/Southern rock
- Subchannels: HD2: True Oldies Y100 (Oldies); HD3: La Fiesta 101.5 (Spanish tropical)

Ownership
- Owner: JVC Media, LLC; (JVC Mergeco, LLC)
- Sister stations: WMFQ, WYGC

History
- First air date: March 3, 1969; 56 years ago (as WTRS-FM)
- Former call signs: WTRS (1969–2016)
- Call sign meaning: W X US 102.3

Technical information
- Licensing authority: FCC
- Facility ID: 3056
- Class: C2
- ERP: 50,000 watts
- HAAT: 149 meters (489 ft)
- Translators: HD2: 100.1 W261BA (Ocala); HD3: 101.5 W268DQ (Dunnellon)
- Repeater: 104.9 WYGC (High Springs pending sale)

Links
- Public license information: Public file; LMS
- Webcast: Listen Live; HD2: Listen Live
- Website: us1023.com HD2: trueoldiesy100.com

WXUS (102.3 FM) is a commercial radio station licensed to Dunnellon, Florida, and broadcasting to the Ocala media market. It is owned by JVC Broadcasting and airs a radio format combining country music and Southern-influenced classic rock. The studios and offices are on SW 7th Street in Ocala.

WXUS is a Class C2 station with an effective radiated power (ERP) of 50,000 watts. The transmitter is off West Highway 328 in Dunnellon.

== History ==
=== WTRS-FM ===
WXUS first signed on the air on March 3, 1969 as WTRS-FM. It had 3,000 watts of power, a fraction of its current output. WTRS-FM (Welcome to Rainbow Springs) was Dunnellon's first radio station and one of the earliest successful FM Top 40 stations in Florida. WTRS-FM was sold in 1975 after one of its owners died in an automobile accident, and the format was changed to "Contemporary Easy Listening," a hybrid of beautiful music and adult contemporary. WTRS-FM was converted to a country format in 1978, and became one of West-Central Florida's most popular stations. The station was sold again in 1981 and switched to Drake-Chenault's beautiful music format, only to switch back to country music after only six months following a deluge of listener complaints. WTRS had been a country station continuously until 2016. In 1983 the station was sold to its then-owner, Asterisk Communications, who upgraded the WTRS signal from 3,000 to 50,000 watts and in 1988 moved the station to new studios in Ocala.

WTRS was unusual among country stations in that it took an implicitly male-oriented approach. It aired the male-appeal Bubba the Love Sponge Show, in morning drive time. The station's afternoon show, Dave and Bo, also aimed for a male audience.

On June 29, 2016 at 10 a.m., WTRS relaunched with a country-southern rock hybrid format, branded as "U.S. 102.3". The station changed its call sign to WXUS on July 5, 2016.

On July 31, 2017, Bubba The Love Sponge was dropped from the daily lineup.

=== WTRS 920 AM (1970–1992) ===
In 1970, WTRS added an AM station, broadcasting on 920 kHz with 500 watts of power. Beginning as a beautiful music station, AM 920 alternated between country and easy listening formats through the 1970s. The call letters were briefly WGAM from 1980 to 1982, programming first country music (Drake-Chenault's "Great American Country") and then adult standards.

In 1982 the station once again became WTRS and settled into a simulcast of 102.3 FM, which continued for ten years. In 1992, management believed few people were listening to the AM station. It surrendered its license to the FCC and its frequency was deleted.

== WXUS-HD2 ==
On June 22, 2019, WXUS launched an oldies format on its HD2 subchannel, branded as "True Oldies Y100". It carries the "True Oldies Channel" programmed by veteran DJ Scott Shannon.
