= WLIM =

- Medford, New York; United States
- Broadcast area: Suffolk County, New York
- Frequency: 1440 kHz
- Branding: En Vivo

Programming
- Language: Spanish
- Format: News/talk

Ownership
- Owner: JVC Broadcasting; (JVC Media LLC)
- Sister stations: WBZO; WDRE; WJVC; WPTY; WRCN-FM

History
- First air date: January 5, 1958
- Former call signs: WBAB (1958–1975); WNYG (1975–2019)

Technical information
- Licensing authority: FCC
- Facility ID: 5208
- Class: D
- Power: 1,000 watts (daytime); 196 watts (night)
- Transmitter coordinates: 40°47′45.4″N 72°59′30.4″W
- Translator: 93.3 W227CL (Port Jefferson)

Links
- Public license information: Public file; LMS
- Webcast: Listen live
- Website: lienvivo.com

WLIM (1440 AM) is a radio station licensed to Medford, New York, broadcasting a Spanish news/talk radio format.

By day, WLIM is powered by 1,000 watts, it reduces to 196 watts at night to avoid interference and stations on 1440 AM. Its programming is also heard on 215-watt FM translator W227CL at 93.3 MHz.

== History ==
Originally licensed to Babylon, New York, the 1440 frequency signed on the air on Sunday January 5, 1958, as WBAB with 500 watts daytime only. Operated by Babylon-Bay Shore Broadcasting Company, the station initially played Jazz and featured a large news department as well as extensive community affairs programs.

WBAB (and its FM signal on 102.3) switched to a pop music format before becoming a progressive rock station by the late 1960s. On October 14, 1975, the station's call sign was changed to WNYG (New York Gospel) after adopting a Gospel music format. The companion FM station, which continued to play rock, was sold shortly after.

In the 1980s, WNYG adopted an MOR (Middle of the Road) format called "14 Gold". Upon receiving nighttime authorization in 1987, WNYG dropped the 14 Gold format and became "Long Island's Good Time Oldies" on January 1, 1988. The playlist was tightened to focus on pre-Beatles rock and roll and doo-wop.

When cross-town rival WGLI flipped from oldies to a simulcast of WADO in late 1989, WNYG began to add more 1960s records.

By the end of 1993, much of the weekday format had been replaced by country music and the station unceremoniously dumped the remainder of the oldies format along with the staff and switched full time to country music on April 18, 1994. The new format lasted but two months when an agreement was reached to sell WNYG to Bienvenida Broadcasting. The station switched to a Tex-Mex format that featured sporting events and news targeted towards the growing Hispanic population in the area.

Bienvenida Broadcasting ran into financial trouble and WNYG ceased operations in March 2000. A month later, a trustee was put into place during bankruptcy proceedings to ready the facility so a new owner could be found to satisfy creditors. During this time, the oldies format that ran from 1988 to 1994 returned with many of the staff, who gave the format a fitting sendoff. In June 2000, Multicultural Radio Broadcasting closed on their agreement to acquire the station.

After various brokered formats in its first year under Multicultural (including a short lived attempt to open the station up to high school and college students), the station was LMAed to Free-Indeed, Broadcasting in 2002. A Contemporary Christian music format was installed.

On November 2, 2009, the agreement between Multicultural and Free-Indeed, concluded and WNYG ceased broadcasting the eight-year-old Contemporary Christian format that had been branded "The Spirit of New York".

On May 26, 2010, Multicultural Radio Broadcasting sold the station to Radio Cantico Nuevo, Inc for $150,000. A stipulation of the sale was that WNYG could no longer operate from the Babylon facility as Multicultural sought to improve the signal of then co-owned WNSW, which was first adjacent to WNYG at 1430 kHz.

On July 1, 2010, the station went silent.

On July 18, 2011, the station signed on in its new city of license, Medford, New York. The Medford location allowed Multicultural to make the desired facility upgrades to WNSW.

On June 28, 2012, WNYG was granted a Federal Communications Commission construction permit to add night operation with 196 watts using a directional antenna. Day operation continues to be 1,000 watts using a non-directional antenna.

In late April 2019, "Radio Cantico Nuevo" swapped with "The Breeze" format on 1580 AM WLIM. On May 1, 2019, the stations swapped call signs, with WNYG becoming WLIM.

Effective November 27, 2020, Radio Cantico Nuevo sold WLIM to Michael Selenza's Commercial Assets, Inc. for $20,000.

On March 31, 2023, Commercial Assets, Inc. announced the sale of WLIM, and translator station, W227CL, in Port Jefferson, to JVC Media LLC for $500,000. The acquisition by JVC Media LLC is part of its efforts to expand its radio broadcasting portfolio in the New York area.

On June 27, 2023, WLIM (as a result of the sale closing the day prior) switched to a simulcast of classic hits-formatted WPTY-HD2, branded as "Big 98.1". On August 1, 2023, the station dropped the "Big 98.1" simulcast, and began broadcasting a continuous loop of tropical music, along with an announcement (in Spanish) that WLIM would switch to a Spanish news–talk format, branded as "En Vivo" in September 2023. The format debuted at 7:00 a.m. on September 5, 2023.
