= WWAV =

Radio station in Santa Rosa Beach, Florida

- Santa Rosa Beach, Florida; United States
- Broadcast area: Emerald Coast–Fort Walton Beach
- Frequency: 102.1 MHz
- Branding: 102.1 The Wave

Programming
- Language: English
- Format: Variety Hits

Ownership
- Owner: JVC Broadcasting; (JVC Mergeco, LLC)
- Sister stations: WBON, WHWY, WZLB

History
- First air date: April 3, 1985
- Former frequencies: 102.3 MHz (1985-1994)
- Call sign meaning: Wave

Technical information
- Licensing authority: FCC
- Facility ID: 19473
- Class: C2
- ERP: 50,000 watts
- HAAT: 114 meters (374 ft)
- Transmitter coordinates: 30°23′10.00″N 86°17′48.00″W

Links
- Public license information: Public file; LMS
- Webcast: Listen live
- Website: www.1021thewave.com

WWAV (102.1 MHz) is a commercial radio station playing a variety hits format, Licensed to Santa Rosa Beach, Florida, and serving the Emerald Coast and Fort Walton Beach area. It is owned by JVC Broadcasting and uses the slogan "We Play Everything."

Initially broadcasting on 102.3 FM from its launch in April 1985, WWAV moved to 102.1 FM around July 1994. WPHK 102.3 of Blountstown would move to 102.7 in 1999, allowing WWAV a power increase.

On December 22, 2020, Community Broadcasters, LLC, sold the entire Fort Walton Beach cluster to JVC Broadcasting for almost $2.3 million, which later closed on February 1, 2021.

Previous logo used through 2008

Logo from 2008 to 2012.
