= WBZO (FM) =

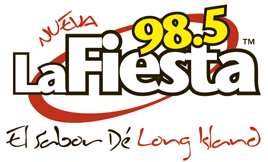
- Westhampton, New York; United States
- Broadcast area: Eastern Long Island
- Frequency: 98.5 MHz
- Branding: La Nueva Fiesta

Programming
- Language: Spanish
- Format: Tropical music

Ownership
- Owner: JVC Broadcasting; (JVC Media LLC, a Florida LLC Company)
- Sister stations: WDRE; WJVC; WLIM; WPTY; WRCN-FM

History
- First air date: September 15, 1993
- Former call signs: WAEF (1993 CP); WMRW (1993–1996); WLIR-FM (1996); WLRI (1996–1997); WDRE (1997–2004); WBON-FM (2004–2007); WBZB (2007); WBON (2007–2025)

Technical information
- Licensing authority: FCC
- Facility ID: 57672
- Class: A
- ERP: 950 watts
- HAAT: 160 meters (520 ft)
- Transmitter coordinates: 40°51′18.4″N 72°46′9.4″W

Links
- Public license information: Public file; LMS
- Webcast: Listen live
- Website: www.lafiestali.com

WBZO (98.5 FM, "La Nueva Fiesta") is a Spanish-language tropical music formatted radio station, licensed to serve Westhampton, New York, and covering eastern Long Island. The station is owned by JVC Media LLC with studios located in Ronkonkoma, New York, and transmitter located in Manorville, New York.

== History ==
The station went on the air September 15, 1993, as WMRW, simulcasting the modern rock of WDRE (92.7 FM). This would continue throughout the 1990s, with the call sign of 98.5 changing to WLIR-FM, WLRI, and finally WDRE. In 2004, the modern rock simulcast ended, 98.5's format changed to classic rock, and the call sign changed to WBON ("98.5 the Bone"). The classic rock format lasted until March 2007. At that time, Jarad Broadcasting was attempting to sell its stations to the Business Talk Radio Network, and as a result the station became WBZB, "Business Talk New York." Programs on WBZB included Doug Stephan's morning show, American Scene with Steve Crowley, an afternoon show hosted by Ray Lucia, and Chick Chat, a talk show geared toward women. The sale fell through, and the call letters were changed back to WBON on September 10, 2007.

After stunting with a simulcast of sister station WDRE (Party 105), and a pre-produced loop of random sound bites, WBON became Long Island's newest 24/7 Spanish-language station at noon on September 20, 2007. The station kicked off by airing 10,000 songs in a row.

On October 2, 2009, the sale of the station by The Morey Organization to JVC Media LLC was completed.
