= WPTY =

Radio station in Calverton–Roanoke, New York

- Calverton–Roanoke, New York; United States
- Broadcast area: Eastern Long Island
- Frequency: 105.3 MHz (HD Radio)
- Branding: Party 105.3

Programming
- Language: English
- Format: Rhythmic contemporary
- Subchannels: HD2: "Big 98.1" (classic hits); HD3: WRXB simulcast "Rebel Radio 100.1" (classic country)

Ownership
- Owner: JVC Broadcasting; (JVC Media LLC, a Florida LLC Company)
- Sister stations: WBZO; WDRE; WJVC; WLIM; WRCN-FM

History
- First air date: May 27, 1998
- Former call signs: WXXP (1998–2004); WDRE (2004–2009)
- Call sign meaning: Party

Technical information
- Licensing authority: FCC
- Facility ID: 31754
- Class: A
- ERP: 660 watts (analog); 6.6 watts (digital)
- HAAT: 185 meters (607 ft)
- Transmitter coordinates: 40°51′18″N 72°46′12″W
- Translator: HD2: (98.1 MHz) W251BY (Patchogue)
- Repeater: HD2: (1570 kHz) WDRE (Riverhead)

Links
- Public license information: Public file; LMS
- Webcast: Listen live; HD2: Listen live
- Website: www.party105.com; HD2: bighits981.com

WPTY (105.3 FM, "Party 105") is a rhythmic contemporary formatted radio station licensed to Calverton–Roanoke, New York, and serving eastern Long Island. The station is owned by JVC Media LLC with studios located in Ronkonkoma, New York, and transmitter located in Manorville, New York.

== History ==
The station signed on the air on March 27, 1998, as WXXP under the leadership of WLIR program director Jeff Levine and operations manager Skyy. Their studio was based in the same building as WLIR in Garden City, New York. At first, the station sounded similar to New York City's rhythmic AC WKTU in format as they were playing older dance material. However, as time went on, Party 105's playlist began to add on newer dance music (house music, trance, freestyle), at times being ahead, and began serving the area with a dance direction, which would prove popular with listeners and gave them an alternative to similarly formatted WKTU, which is also heard in the area. Despite being a Dance station it also ventured into the Rhythmic Top 40 arena as well but kept the Dance product intact.

On January 12, 2004, the station picked up the call letters of the former WDRE, but kept the dance format.

On September 15, 2005, owners The Morey Organization (TMO) changed the format of its stations (along with 107.1 WLIR and 98.5 WBON). 105.3 became Top 40 "FM Channel 105, Party Hits". The on-air staff was fired and the new format ran with limited commercials, with each programming hour sponsored by an individual advertiser. But the switch did not generate adequate revenue and by December 19, 2005, TMO returned to the dance format and the "Party 105.3" moniker.

On December 26, 2006, BusinessTalkRadio.net President and Chief Executive Officer Michael Metter announced the purchases of WLIR, WBON, and WDRE for an undisclosed price but the transaction was never completed.

On January 1, 2008, a simulcast was added via a translator at 101.5 FM in Plainview, New York. This simulcast covered parts of Nassau and Western Suffolk counties not reached by the 105.3 signal.

On October 7, 2009, WDRE was sold to JVC Media LLC by the Morey Organization. The station adopted the WPTY call sign shortly afterward on October 28, 2009. On October 30, 2009, it was revealed that JVC took over the audio programming lease of low power TV channel 6, WNYZ-LP, after Mega Media's contract with WNYZ owner Island Broadcasting was terminated due to financial differences between Mega and WNYZ. This resulted in the end of WNYZ's dance music format. WPTY began simulcasting the 105.3 signal over WNYZ-LP TV channel 6 and its 87.7 FM audio frequency on November 2, 2009, and adopted the new slogan "Party FM - Your Party Music Leader. "Five years after dance music fans had campaigned for the relaying of Party 105 for New York City via the 92.7 frequency, the simulcast of the station finally became a reality, albeit on a different frequency. On January 21, 2010, JVC terminated the WNYZ-LP simulcast arrangement due to the fact that JVC media was negotiating a purchase of two new FM signals in the market and the LMA with WNYZ would place the group above the FCC ownership limits. On March 25, 2011, the 101.5 signal was dropped in Nassau and was replaced by a broadcast signal owned by WLTW.

On October 18, 2011, WPTY changed their format to gold based rhythmic adult contemporary, reverting to the "Party 105.3" branding. However, after nearly seven months into the format WPTY began returning to a Dance Top 40 direction (moving away from freestyle music) in late April 2012 with less Rhythmic and Dance gold and recurrents. In October 2013, DJs Goumba Johnny and DJ Miss Stacy both left the station.

=== WPTY-HD2 ===
In November 2016, JVC Broadcasting launched "Oldies 98.1" on the station's HD2 feed, with W251BY (98.1) launching as the station's analog translator and namesake. This move returned oldies and pop-based classic hits to central Suffolk County after WBZO 103.1 shifted to a more rock-oriented classic hits format during 2014 and 2015.

On June 21, 2022, WPTY-HD2 began a process of changing its branding from "Oldies 98.1" to "Big 98.1".
