= WJDM =

- Mineola, New York; United States
- Broadcast area: New York metropolitan area
- Frequency: 1530 kHz
- Branding: Radio Cantico Nuevo

Programming
- Language: Spanish
- Format: Christian radio

Ownership
- Owner: Cantico Nuevo Ministry, Inc.
- Sister stations: WNYG

History
- First air date: November 17, 1948
- Former call signs: WKBS (1946–1956); WKIT (1956–1959); WFYI (1959–1965); WTHE (1965–2021)
- Former frequencies: 1520 kHz (1946–2023)

Technical information
- Licensing authority: FCC
- Facility ID: 68957
- Class: D
- Power: 10,000 watts (daytime); 500 watts (critical hours)
- Transmitter coordinates: 40°41′6.4″N 73°36′34.5″W
- Translators: (97.5 MHz) W248CG (Jersey City, New Jersey); (101.5 MHz) W268AN (Plainview)

Links
- Public license information: Public file; LMS
- Webcast: Listen live
- Website: radiocanticonuevo.com

WJDM (1530 AM; Radio Cantico Nuevo) is a radio station licensed to Mineola, New York, broadcasting a Spanish language Christian radio format. The station is owned by Cantico Nuevo Ministry, Inc.

WJDM broadcasts during daytime hours only, from local sunrise to sunset to protect WCKY in Cincinnati, a clear-channel station on the same frequency that can be heard in the New York City area after dark.

The station, which was previously WTHE on 1520 AM, went silent on January 25, 2018, after being evicted from their transmitter site. It resumed broadcasting on January 15, 2019, to keep the station's license from being cancelled and the call letters deleted by the FCC.

In February 2019, Cantico Nuevo Ministry filed a $200,000 deal to purchase WTHE from Universal Broadcasting of New York. The purchase was consummated on November 14, 2019, at a price of $200,000.

The call letters were changed to WJDM from WTHE on May 27, 2021. The WJDM call letters had previously belonged to another Cantico Nuevo station, also on 1530 AM in Elizabeth, New Jersey, which had its license cancelled in 2020.

In June 2023 WJDM moved from 1520 AM to 1530 AM and increased its power from 1000 to 10000 watts thereby providing a stronger signal especially over New York City and portions of northern New Jersey.
