= WBGF =

Radio station in Belle Glade, Florida

Simulcast of WZFL
- Belle Glade, Florida; United States
- Broadcast area: West Palm Beach, Florida
- Frequency: 93.5 MHz
- Branding: Revolution 93.5

Programming
- Language: English
- Format: Dance/EDM
- Affiliations: Compass Media Networks

Ownership
- Owner: ANCO Media Group; (Zoo Communications, LLC)
- Sister stations: WZFL

History
- First air date: October 10, 1978
- Former call signs: WSWN-FM (1978–1989)
- Call sign meaning: Belle Glade, Florida

Technical information
- Licensing authority: FCC
- Facility ID: 59661
- Class: C3
- ERP: 15,500 watts
- HAAT: 127.8 meters (419 ft)
- Transmitter coordinates: 26°42′44.2″N 80°40′58.2″W

Links
- Public license information: Public file; LMS
- Webcast: Listen live
- Website: www.revolution935.com

WBGF (93.5 FM) is a radio station serving the West Palm Beach radio market. Owned by ANCO Media Group and licensed to Belle Glade, Florida, it broadcasts a dance/EDM format, branded as Revolution 93.5.

== History ==
The station went on the air as WSWN-FM on October 10, 1978. On June 19, 1989, the station changed its call sign to WBGF.

The station previously broadcast a regional Mexican format branded as "Radio Lobo"; on September 22, 2014, WBGF was acquired by JVC Media from its previous owner BGI Broadcasting. On September 23, 2014, shortly after the completion of the purchase, WBGF flipped to a mainstream rock format branded as "93.5 The Bar", opening with a day-long marathon of the Bubba the Love Sponge show (which was to be The Bar's morning show), followed by 10,000 songs commercial-free.

On January 1, 2017, at Midnight, WBGF flipped to Scott Shannon's True Oldies Channel. No formal signoff was given for The Bar; the station went from the syndicated program "hardDrive" (on which the last song played was "Highway" by Bleeker) straight into the True Oldies Channel at the stroke of midnight (the first song on True Oldies was "My Girl" by The Temptations).

On May 19, 2017, ANCO Media Group announced that it would acquire WBGF from JVC. Upon its completion of its transmitter move to properly serve the West Palm Beach area and closing of the sale, the station would flip to dance and adopt the "Revolution 93.5" branding to mirror South Florida simulcast sister WZFL-W228BV-W228BY/WHYI-HD2 (the sale closed in August, with WBGF flipping to "Revolution" on the 7th). JVC initially announced that it would move the oldies format to translator W223CJ (92.5 FM) upon the close of the sale, though this would later be moved to WSVU.
