= WNYG =

Spanish-language Christian radio station in Patchogue, New York

- Patchogue, New York; United States
- Broadcast area: Long Island
- Frequency: 1580 kHz

Programming
- Language: Spanish
- Format: Christian radio

Ownership
- Owner: Cantico Nuevo Ministry, Inc
- Sister stations: WJDM

History
- First air date: December 4, 1951
- Former call signs: WPAC (1951–1972); WSUF (1972–1977); WYFA (1977–1981); WLIM (1981–2019)

Technical information
- Licensing authority: FCC
- Facility ID: 38333
- Class: D
- Power: 10,000 watts (Daytime); 4 watts (Night)
- Transmitter coordinates: 40°45′16.4″N 72°59′7.4″W
- Translator: 96.5 W243ES (Medford)

Links
- Public license information: Public file; LMS
- Webcast: Listen live
- Website: radiocanticonuevo.com

WNYG (1580 AM Radio Cantico Nuevo) is a radio station licensed to serve Patchogue, New York, it airs a Spanish language Christian radio format. Its transmitter site and former studios are located at 45 Pennsylvania Ave in Medford, New York.

== History ==
The station went on the air on December 4, 1951 as WPAC. Its first studios and offices were located in the Mills Building on Main St. in Patchogue. Transmitting facilities were located on the former Bailey's Mill property on West Ave. in Patchogue. In the early hours of February 10, 1956, fire destroyed the Mills Building, however, the station was able to continue broadcasting from its transmitter site off the Patchogue River until new studios were built at 31 West Main St in Patchogue. The station would become the highest powered station on Long Island, when it increased power from its original 250 watts to 1,000 watts in February 1956. In early 1959, the station built a new office, studio and transmitting facility on the corner of Pennsylvania & Woodside Avenues in Medford, New York. A new 10,000–watt transmitter was installed at this time and the station began broadcasting a 10 kW directional daytime signal from 2 towers. Previously the station broadcast a 1 kW non-directional daytime signal from a single tower. Rick Sklar who, while at New York City's WABC, was one of the originators of the top 40 radio format, began his career at WPAC.

The station changed call letters to WSUF in July 1972 and went dark for 3 years beginning on April 15, 1975. In early May 1975, the station building was gutted by what local police termed suspicious fires, twice in a 24–hour period. The station was sold in late 1977 to Brookhaven Broadcasting Corporation and returned to the air in 1978 with the new call letters WYFA. The station was assigned the WLIM call letters by the Federal Communications Commission on July 13, 1981, after being purchased by Long Island Music Broadcasting. After becoming WLIM, the station began a Big Band/Standards format. Radio veteran Jack Ellsworth (who started his radio career in the late 1940s and became known as the "Silver Fox") ran the independent radio station from 1981 to 2001. There, he continued the show he launched in 1948 at WHIM in Providence and for which he was best known, Memories in Melody.

The station went silent on November 2, 2017, due to storm damage to one of their broadcast towers. WLIM resumed operations on March 27, 2018, at reduced power, while repairs were made to the damaged tower.

In May 2018, Cantico Nuevo Ministry filed a $350,000 deal to purchase WLIM from Polnet Communications. The sale was consummated on August 16, 2018. On May 25, 2018, WLIM dropped the Polish format and began simulcasting WNYG. Both stations share transmitting facilities and diplex on one of WLIM's 3 transmitting towers. In mid-August 2018, the WNYG simulcast was dropped and the station began broadcasting "The Breeze", which had previously been broadcast on WVIP-HD3. In late April 2019, "The Breeze" format swapped with "Radio Cantico Nuevo" on 1440 AM WNYG. On May 1, 2019, the stations swapped call letters with WLIM becoming WNYG.
