= JVC Broadcasting =

American broadcasting company

JVC Broadcasting (also known as JVC Media) is a privately owned company headquartered in Ronkonkoma, New York that owns five radio stations on Long Island, New York, and 12 FM stations in Florida.

The company founded in 2008 derives its initials from its founder John Caracciolo.

== History ==
The company has its roots with Caracciolo who has been with the frequency's for years and was the driving force behind classic alternative rock station WLIR 92.7 and has worked with many FM outlets on Long Island. John Caracciolo was associated with the company for 20 years most of the time as president.

In 2006, the owner of the company that Caracciolo worked for entered into an agreement with Business Talk Radio to sell the remaining station Long Island stations. When the deal fell through in 2007 Caracciolo brought in a staff of radio pros to reinvigorate the brand and start a Spanish station on the frequency of WBON.

In late 2008, Caracciolo offered to buy the stations from the previous owner who at the time wanted to exit the business. The purchase closed in October 2009. He changed WDRE to the WPTY ("party") designation.

In March 2012, the Brookhaven Town Board approved a five-year agreement with Long Island Events, the event division of JVC Broadcasting, to produce, manage and operate the Brookhaven Amphitheater, and it was subsequently announced that an agreement has been reached with All Island Media to rename the venue the Pennysaver Amphitheater at Bald Hill.

== Radio stations ==
=== Current ===
Branding	Callsign	Frequency (MHz)	Power (W)	Location	Owned since	Format
LI News Radio	WRCN-FM	103.9	1,400 watts	Riverhead, New York	2009	News/talk, New York Jets
My Country 96.1	WJVC	96.1	2,650 watts	Center Moriches, New York	2011	Country music
Party 105.3	WPTY	105.3	660 watts	Calverton, New York	2009	Rhythmic–dance hits
Big 98.1	W251BY	98.1	250 watts	Patchogue, New York	2016	Oldies
La Nueva Fiesta	WBZO	98.5	950 watts	Westhampton, New York	2009	Spanish tropical
Q92.9	WMFQ^{1}	92.9	50,000 watts	Ocala, Florida	2013	Contemporary hit radio
U.S. 102.3	WXUS^{1}	102.3	50,000 watts	Dunnellon, Florida	2013	Country & Southern rock
U.S. 102.3	WYGC^{1}	104.9	3,200 watts	High Springs, Florida	2013	Country & Southern rock, WYGC simulcast.
Florida Man Radio	WZLB	103.1	50,000 watts	Valparaiso, Florida	2021	Hot talk.
92.1 The Bone	WBON	92.1	19,000 watts	Destin, Florida	2021	Active rock
Highway 98	WHWY	98.1	100,000 watts	Holt, Florida	2021	Country
102.1 The Wave	WWAV	102.1	50,000 watts	Santa Rosa Beach, Florida	2021	Adult hits
La Fiesta 106.9	WFWO	106.9	2,850 watts	Fort Walton Beach, Florida	2025	Spanish tropical
		AM Frequency (kHz)				
En Vivo 93.3	WLIM	1440	1,000 watts (day); 196 watts (night)	Medford, New York	2023	Spanish news/talk
	WDRE	1570	1,000 watts (day); 500 watts (night)	Riverhead, New York	2024	

=== Former ===
Callsign	Frequency (MHz)	Power (kW)	Location	Owned from	Notes
WGMW^{1}	99.5 MHz	2.2	LaCrosse, Florida	2013-2014	Sold to RDA Broadcast Holdings, LLC on June 3, 2014 for $3.5 million.
WBGF	93.5 MHz	1.4	West Palm Beach, Florida	2014-2017	Sold to ANCO Media Group.
WSWN	900 kHz	1 kW (day); 22 watts (night)	West Palm Beach, Florida	2014-2018	Sold to Sugar Broadcasting, Inc. on August 10, 2018 for $125,000.
WXJZ	100.9 MHz	6	Gainesville, Florida	2013-2017	Sold to MARC Radio Group
WSVU	960 kHz	2.4 kW (day); 1.4 kW (night)	North Palm Beach, Florida	2014-2017	Sold to Vic Canales Media Group, LLC
