= East End (Long Island) =

Region of Long Island, New York, United States

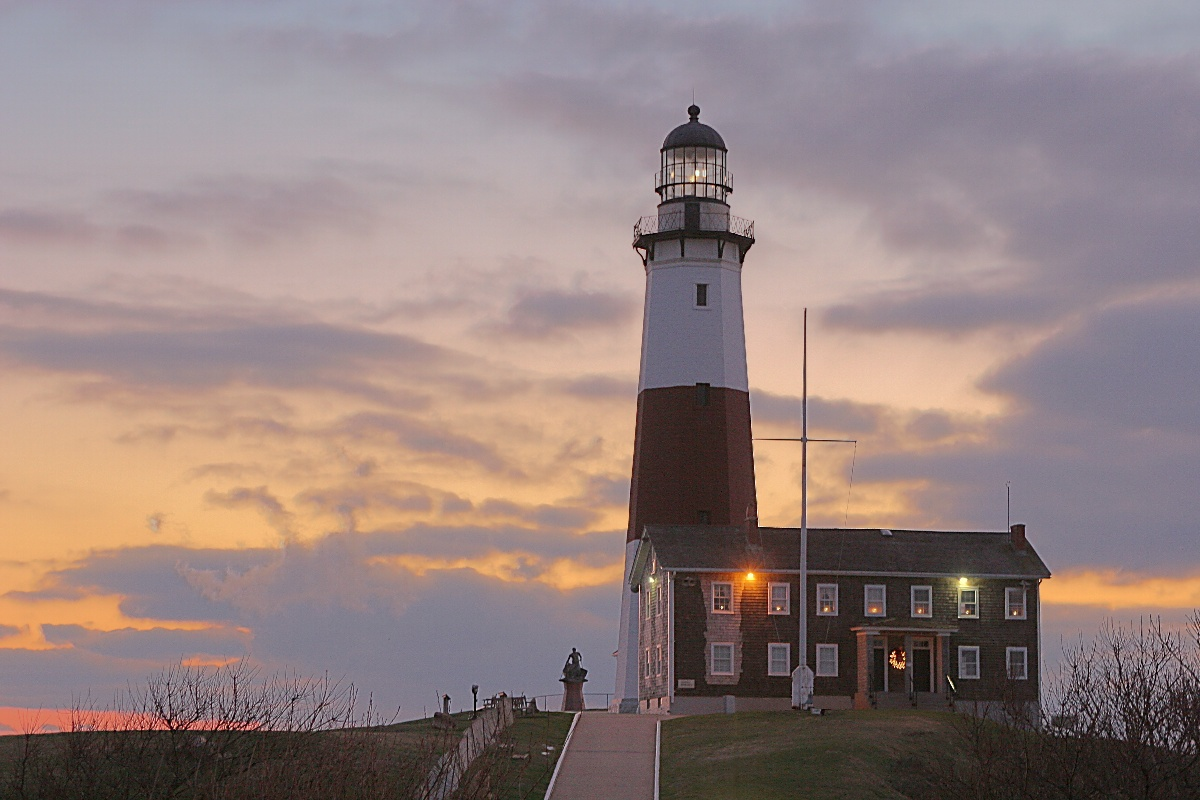
The Montauk Point Lighthouse stands at the eastern tip on the mainland of Long Island.

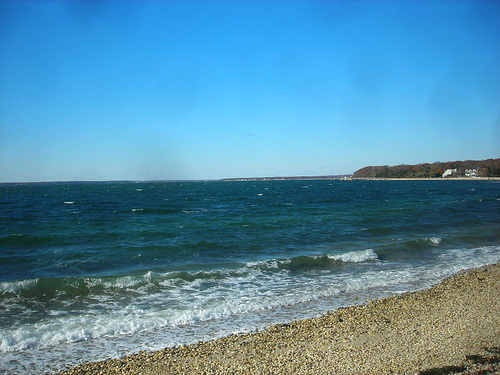
The Great Peconic Bay, with the Atlantic Ocean as its primary inflow, separates the North Fork and South Fork at the East End of Long Island.

The East End of Long Island is constituted by the five towns at the eastern end of New York's Suffolk County, namely Riverhead, Southampton (which includes Westhampton), Southold, Shelter Island, and East Hampton. Long Island's North Fork and South Fork, and the Hamptons are part of the East End. "The East End" is sometimes shortened as "The End", but this latter term is also applied only to Montauk, the most easterly hamlet of the contiguous land mass.

The East End includes the best-known part of Long Island's Viticultural Area, as well as The Hamptons and related resort areas. While other Suffolk County communities have long been considered suburban to New York City, the more rural East End townships have traditionally relied more upon agriculture and recreation. Residents of the five eastern townships had occasionally advocated seceding from Suffolk County to form a proposed "Peconic County", named for the Peconic Bay at the center of the East End's geography. The East End's North Shore is bounded by Long Island Sound, while its east and south are bounded by Block Island Sound and the Atlantic Ocean; the west is bounded by Brookhaven.

The East End is also home to Gabreski Air Base, Plum Island's Animal Disease Center, and the Shinnecock Indian Nation's Shinnecock Reservation.

== Area and population ==
At the 2000 census, the five East End towns and the Shinnecock Reservation had a land area of 900.581 km^{2} (347.716 sq mi), or about 38.12 percent of Suffolk County's land area. Its total population was 125,442 inhabitants, or about 8.84 percent of the county's population. Its average population density was 139.29 people/km^{2} (360.8 people/mi^{2}).

Suffolk County's five western townships (that is, Suffolk County without the East End) have a total land area of 1,462.001 km^{2} (564.482 sq mi) and an adjusted 2000 census population of 1,293,927 inhabitants, for a population density of 885.04 people/km^{2} (2,292.2 people/mi^{2}), more than six times that of the East End.
