= WYBC (AM) =

Currently silent
- New Haven, Connecticut; United States
- Broadcast area: Greater New Haven
- Frequency: 1340 kHz

Programming
- Language: English

Ownership
- Owner: Yale Broadcasting Company, Inc.
- Sister stations: WYBC-FM

History
- First air date: December 1944
- Former call signs: WNHC (1944–1998)
- Call sign meaning: Yale Broadcasting Company

Technical information
- Licensing authority: FCC
- Facility ID: 72820
- Class: C
- Power: 1,000 watts (day); 880 watts (night)
- Transmitter coordinates: 41°17′33.3″N 72°57′10.4″W
- Translator: (105.5 MHz) W288DV (New Haven)

Links
- Public license information: Public file; LMS

WYBC (1340 AM) is a radio station operating on the campus of Yale University in New Haven, Connecticut. The station is owned by Yale Broadcasting Company, Inc., and is silent. From 2011 to 2026, Sacred Heart University programmed WYBC under a time brokerage agreement as a public radio station associated with WSHU and WSHU-FM, airing a news/talk format.

== History ==
The 1340 AM frequency first signed-on in December 1944 as WNHC, under the ownership of the Elm City Broadcasting Corporation. Elm City was principally controlled by Patrick J. Goode, U.S. postmaster for New Haven and former co-owner of WELI radio; and Aldo DeDominicis, a former WELI sales person. Triangle Publications acquired the station, along with WNHC-FM 99.1 and WNHC-TV (channel 8), from Elm City in 1956.

Triangle had sold its stations, including WNHC-AM-FM-TV, to Capital Cities Communications in 1971. However, the new owners were forced by the Federal Communications Commission (FCC) to spin off the radio stations to comply with then-current ownership limits; WNHC was sold to Westerly Broadcasting Company. By this time, the station had a contemporary format; this gave way in 1976 to a middle-of-the-road/talk format.

WNHC again attempted a top 40 format starting in June 1979 in an attempt to compete against WAVZ; however, just weeks later, WAVZ swapped formats with its sister station, WKCI. With minimal promotion, WNHC struggled to compete with WKCI's stronger FM signal, and in March 1980 it flipped to an urban format. However, the station ran into financial problems during the 1990s, forcing owner Willis Communications to file for Chapter 11 bankruptcy in December 1997. The bankruptcy resulted in a battle between Yale Broadcasting Company, which wanted to eliminate a competitor to WYBC-FM, and Buckley Broadcasting over the sale of WNHC, as well as protests against Yale Broadcasting in New Haven's African American community. The dispute ended on June 3, 1998, when Yale Broadcasting purchased the station in bankruptcy court; the next morning, WNHC was shut down at the order of a United States bankruptcy judge for the District of Connecticut. It returned to the air under Yale Broadcasting's control on September 15; on October 5, the call sign was changed to WYBC. Starting in 1941, Yale students had operated an unofficial AM radio station using weak-signal carrier current technology tolerated by the FCC and common among student-run stations at the time, renamed WYBC and changed to 640 AM in 1945, but that station ceased operations by the early 1980s.

In the station's first decade as WYBC, unlike many college campus radio stations, it featured both student and non-student programming, some professional. However, interest in the station eventually dwindled (in sharp contrast, sister station WYBC-FM, largely programmed at the time by Cox Radio, is one of the highest-rated urban adult contemporary stations in the country), and its college radio programming was transitioned to an Internet radio station, WYBCX, by 2010.

WYBC converted to public radio programming, provided by Sacred Heart University, on April 4, 2011; WYBC-FM would continue to operate as a commercial station. The time brokerage agreement with Sacred Heart University provided funding for WYBCX's operations. The AM station uses a small ValCom fiberglass antenna in place of the original metal tower which stood on the site. WYBC went silent in October 2026, after the agreement with WSHU Public Radio expired.

== See also ==
- Campus radio
- List of college radio stations in the United States
