= WICC =

WICC may refer to:

- WICC (AM), a news and information radio station in Bridgeport, Connecticut
- WICC-FM, a radio station in Southport, Connecticut
- WICC-TV, a defunct television station in Bridgeport, Connecticut
- Women's International Champions Cup
- WONCA International Classification Committee, of the World Organization of Family Doctors
- Husein Sastranegara International Airport, Bandung, West Java, Indonesia (ICAO airport code: WICC)
- Wessex Integrated Control Centre, a railway operational control centre at Waterloo Station in London, jointly operated by Network Rail and South Western Railway
