= Dunbar Hill =

Neighborhood in Hamden, Connecticut

- neighborhood
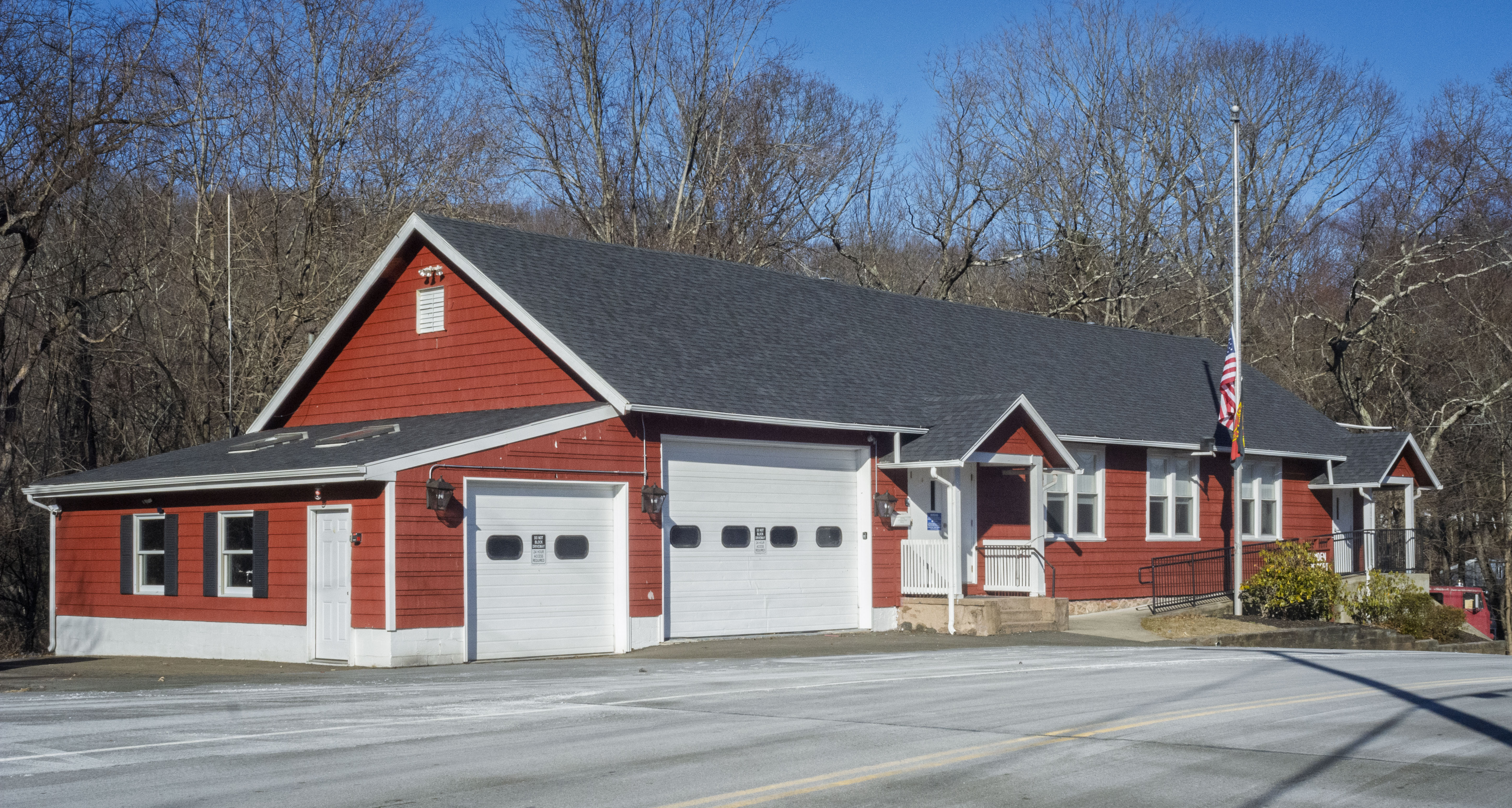
- Station 8 on Dunbar Hill Road
- Interactive map of Dunbar Hill
- Coordinates: 41°22′04″N 72°56′49″W
- Country: United States
- State: Connecticut
- County: New Haven
- Town: Hamden

Dunbar Hill is a residential neighborhood in the southwestern portion of the town of Hamden, Connecticut.

== History ==
=== Early history ===
Giles Dunbar, a freeman of the original Thirteen Colonies and congregant of Mount Carmel Church, built his home and woolen mill off Building Brook at the bottom of the hill by Main Street. In 1827, Dunbar became a town hayward (profession). A school bearing his name would eventually be built in place of the mill, as the area would become known as Dunbar. Over time, this would turn into Dunbar Hill to describe the terrain of the neighborhood.

=== Dunbar Chapel and Community Hall ===
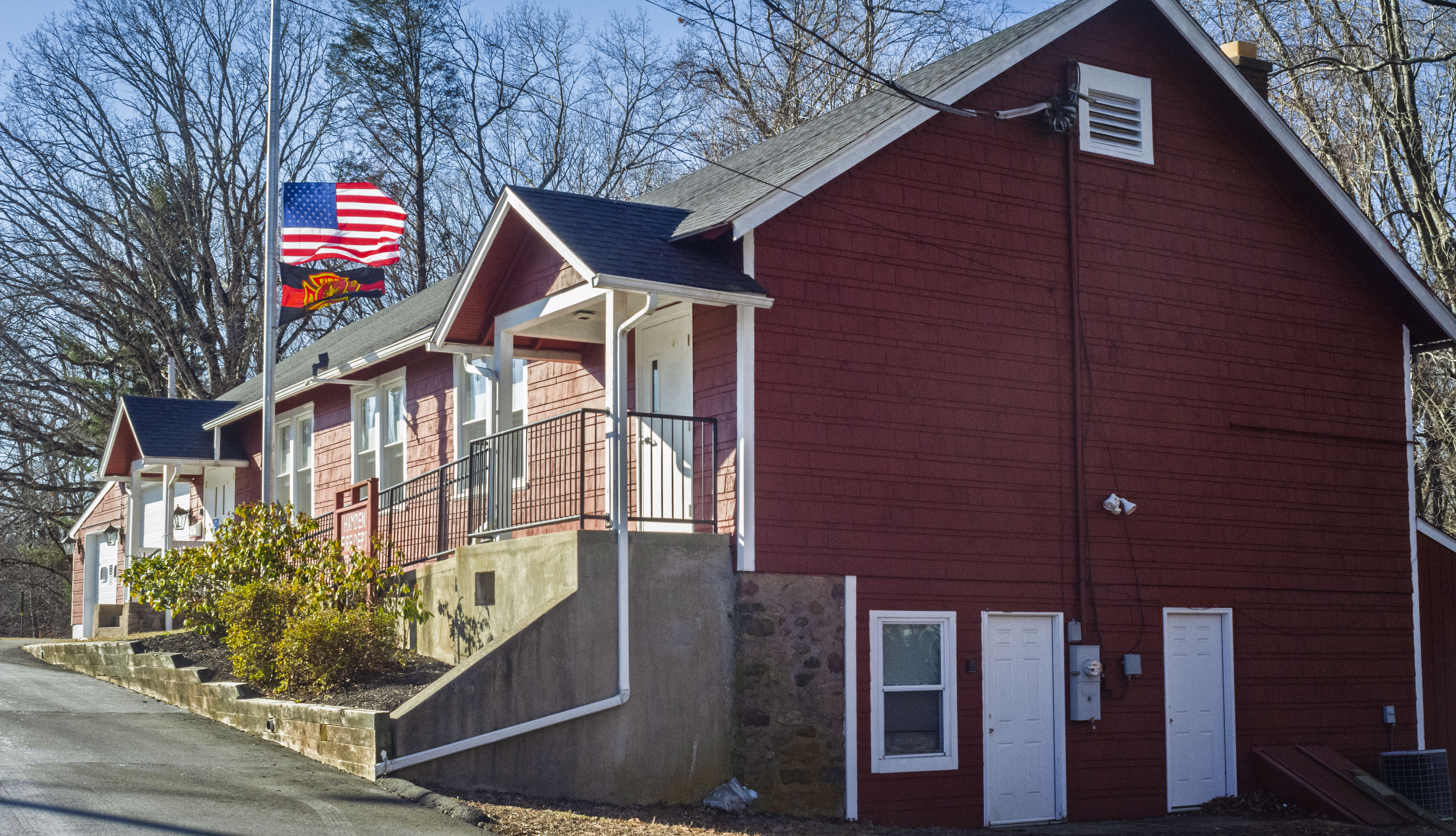
Dunbar Hill Volunteer Fire Company Station 8

A church, Dunbar Chapel, was constructed in 1900 on Dunbar Hill Road north of the firehouse. Services and sunday school were well attended for a few decades. After disagreements on programming caused falling attendance and a deteriorating building, the church was demolished in 1932.

According to Dunbar United Church Historian Audrey Linke, a group of local women founded the Dunbar Community Club and raised funds to build in 1926 what would become the Community Hall. Located on Dunbar Hill Road on land donated by Everett Warner, this building would also house a fire apparatus. Originally housing Dunbar Company, the building today houses Dunbar Hill Volunteer Fire Company 8.

=== A.C. Gilbert's Contributions to Dunbar Hill ===
In the 1920s, Alfred Carlton Gilbert, founder of the A. C. Gilbert Company, asked and received permission from local Dunbar-area farmers to hunt and pick mountain laurel on their land. According to Gilbert, men from the State Agriculture Department praised the quality of the mountain laurel.

In 1930, A.C. Gilbert decided to acquire enough land abutting Paradise Avenue to create his own Paradise Game Preserve and ended up with 600 acres from multiple farms. According to Gilbert, he gave part of the property to the town of Hamden in 1931. This allowed the town to widen and straighten Paradise Avenue.

Originally intended to be named Laurel Hills, Gilbert worked with a crew to pave one-and-a-quarter miles of a high ridge extension to Dunbar Hill Road. He gave this road to the town, but still had a hand in laying out the subsequent development.

In 1937, Gilbert began selling parts of his property as lots for others to build on, selling 500 acres by 1960. By this time, his property included about 90 acres of mountain laurel.

=== Dunbar United Church ===
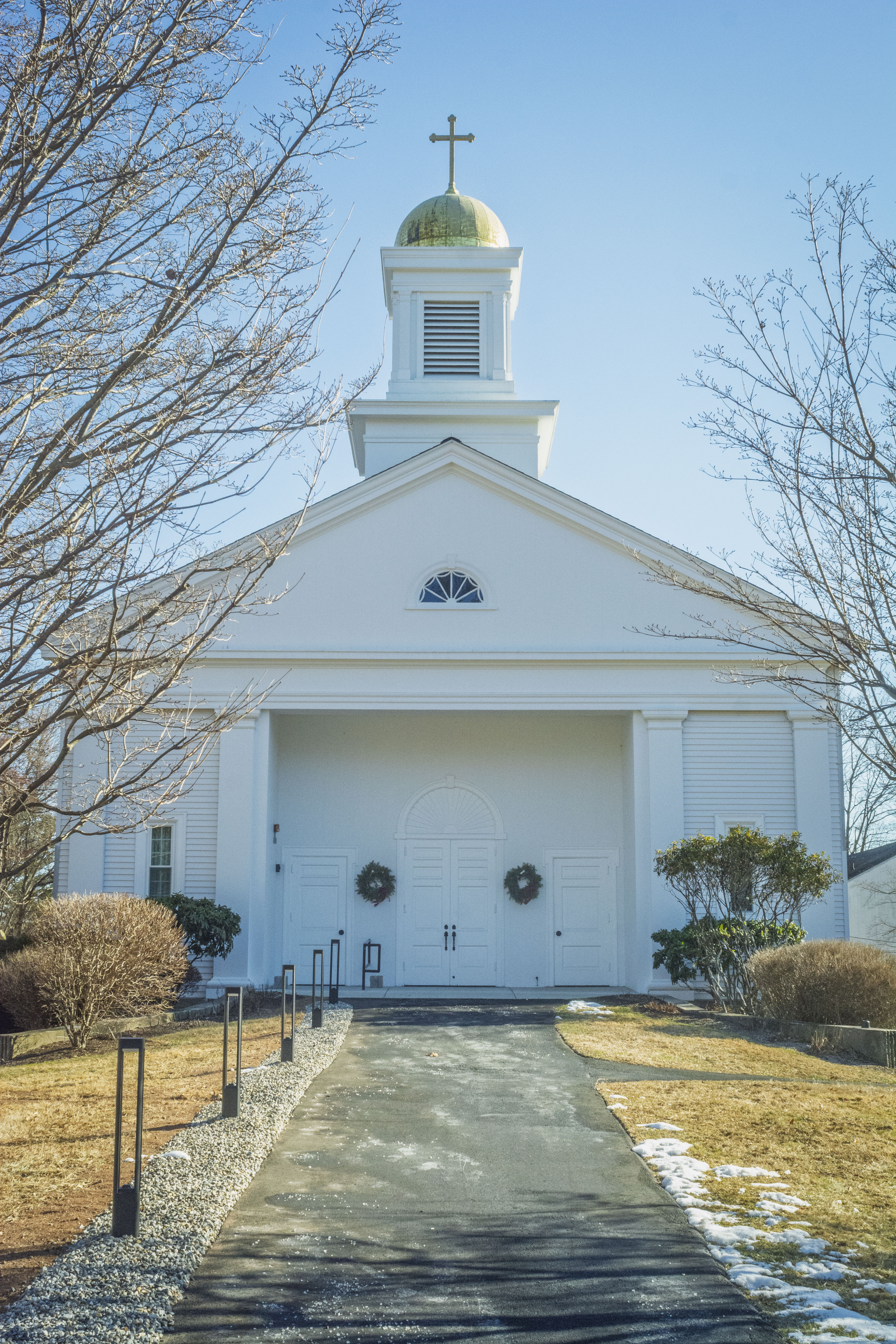
Dunbar United Church of Christ in January 2025

During the war, gasoline rationing made traveling to New Haven challenging for families, according to Linke. In 1945, local parents formed the Dunbar Sunday School Association, which by 1947 was renamed the Dunbar United Church. During the church's formative years, services took place in the Community Hall. In 1948, the church purchased land at the intersection of Benham Street and Dunbar Hill Road. A parsonage was added to the property in 1951, followed by the construction of a new chapel in 1953.

The bell used in the new chapel was from the then recently-retired CB&Q 4-6-2 Steam Locomotive Engine #2956. It was first rung at the Community House on Christmas Eve in 1956. The new building hosted its first services in April 1957. To support its activities, the church initiated an annual apple festival as a fundraising event.

=== Church of the Ascension ===
A Confraternity of Christian Doctrine Youth Center for Ascension Parish was proposed for northern Dunbar Hill Road in 1965, led by Rev. John F. Cotter, according to the Catholic Transcript.

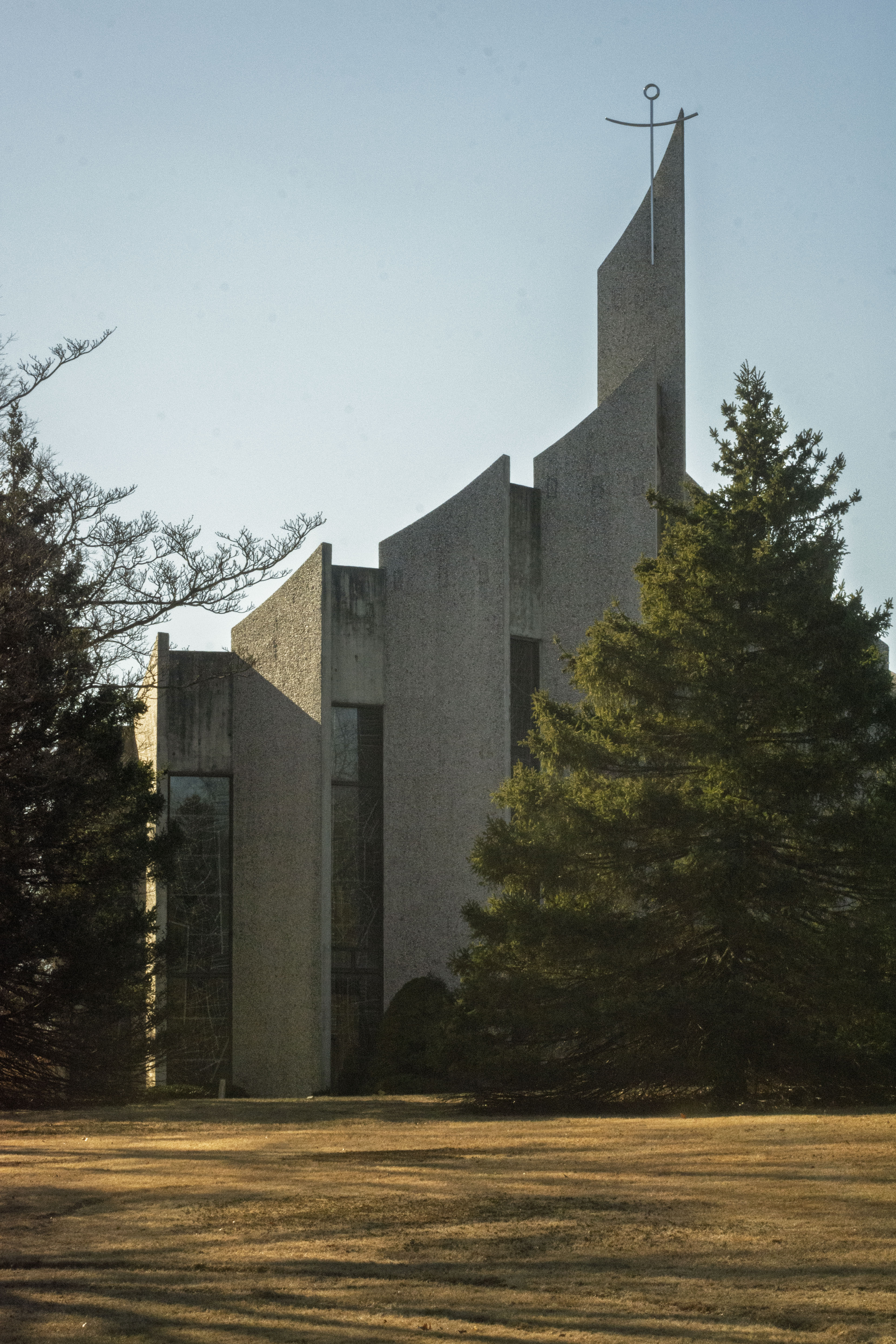
The Church of the Ascension in January 2025

The new Church of the Ascension, designed by architect Robert H Motrux, opened in 1968. The brutalist design includes radial elements with tall slabs creating a graduated spiral pattern. According to the Bridgeport Post, sculptured panels were taken directly from the Vatican Pavilion at the 1964-1965 New York World's Fair. The Plasticrete Corporation, which had originally built the pieces for the pavilion, was based in Hamden. The church culminated at the top with a 65-foot concrete spire.

=== Modern development and conservation efforts ===
In 1978, Dunbar Hill community members were invited to be involved in the development process for much of the former Paradise Game Preserve land. When presented with housing development plans by then-current landowners, Game Preserve Associates, some were apprehensive about building on undeveloped land, according to the New Haven Register, with some community members reaching out to the Nature Conservancy and Sierra Club to try to acquire it.

Residential development plans were approved in the middle of the 1980s and 180 acres of land was split between 26 lots. In 1991, the development foreclosed after one home was built. In 1994, Elm Street Builders Corp. Inc. bought the property for $1.37 million intending to begin working with Beazley Co. Realtors to market and sell the subdivided lots. At this time, the mountain laurel was described by writer Stephen Higgins of the New Haven Register as being as high as 20 feet.

== Government ==
The Town of Hamden provides all municipal services for the neighborhood. It is located in Connecticut's 3rd congressional district. Most of the neighborhood is in the 17th state senate district. It is in the 7th district of the town legislative council. It is served by the Hamden post office with ZIP code 06514.

== Transportation ==
The Wilbur Cross Parkway (Route 15) runs through the southern part of the neighborhood.

== Education ==
In the early 1800s, a one-room red schoolhouse was erected where modern-day Cooper Lane meets Dunbar Hill Road. A second neighborhood school was built in 1863.

=== Dunbar School ===
In 1904, Dunbar School was closed following a measles epidemic, according to historian Rachel Hartley. The town's health officer Dr. Lay stated that the building had become overcrowded and that because of its location at the bottom of the hill, the building was prone to flooding. Hamden's school board decided in October 1905 for a new Dunbar School to be built.

In June 1906, the town purchased a piece of 100x150 foot land on the hillside above the former schoolhouse for $150, planning to immediately begin construction. However, some residents were unhappy with the location chosen and petitioned the town, prompting the call for a July hearing to create a new committee. Once a second location was chosen, both factions debated until August 29, 1906, when, during a meeting at Town Hall, the decision was made to sell the property bought earlier in the year and continue with building on the property formerly owned by Vinas Warner. This building was open for the beginning of the 1906 school year.

In 1918, the building was expanded, with two additional classrooms.

=== Dunbar Hill Elementary School ===
The current Dunbar Hill Elementary School was originally built in 1951 and boasted the first auditorium and cafeteria of any of the public schools.

In 1993, after months of debate, the town approved a $3.7 million renovation to replace the roof, and electrical system, and add a new media center and entrance, according to the New Haven Register. By May 1994, the stalled project's budget ballooned to $4.2 million.

During renovations, students were sent to Wintergreen School. Work continued through the 1994-1995 school year. The school reopened September 1995, with renovations estimating around $5.245 million.

=== Wintergreen School ===
Wintergreen School, located in the southwestern part of the district on Wintergreen Avenue near the Route 15 embankment, opened in 1964 but was closed in 1978 after enrollment decreased. In the early 1990s, Hamden School Board members began to lobby for its use as a magnet school. In 1994, Board of Education Chairman DeWitt Jones commented that the current idea for the school, which would focus on science and technology, could help with overcrowding.

The town, in partnership with the Area Cooperative Educational Services (ACES), reopened the school as Wintergreen Interdistrict Magnet School, run by a for-profit company Edison Project, in the fall of 1998.

According to The New York Times, starting in the 1999-2000 year, desktop computers would be given to third graders for communication between students, parents, and teachers of Edison schools nationwide. Also mentioned in the article is that the school would have one custodian, while the responsibility of cleaning the entire building would fall to an outsourced company. Times writer Nancy Polk mentions that while the for-profit status of Edison was the cause of debate, "parents in Hamden, New Haven, and Wallingford responded so enthusiastically that a lottery was needed for admission."

Students would attend from kindergarten, and, starting with the 1999-2000 year, until 8th grade. This was due to funds acquired from the state of Connecticut for additional development of the school, according to the New Haven Register.

According to the New Haven Independent, ACES did not renew its contract with Edison after 2003 while still opting to attempt to keep the same curriculum.

As of 2018, students in K-3 received iPads while those in 3rd to 8th grade got Chromebooks. The school also had begun to strengthen its arts programming. That same year, Hamden Public Schools announced plans to use the building as a swing-site for students whose own elementary schools were undergoing renovations, much like what was done in the 1990s. This decision meant that they wanted ACES to cease operating out of Wintergreen.

According to the New Haven Independent, Hamden would "no longer have to pay ACES to send Hamden students there." Then-Legislative Council Education Committee Chair Lauren Garrett explained to Independent writer Sam Gurwitt that, "From the perspective of Hamden Public Schools, Wintergreen got way too expensive for Hamden." In response, ACES began the process of looking to acquire the property. In the meantime, ACES moved their operations to North Haven.

In July 2022, Hamden's Legislative Council authorized the plan to sell the building to ACES for $16 million, according to New Haven Independent writer Nora Grace-Flood.

In 2023, ACES Wintergreen Interdistrict Magnet School was once again operating at the Wintergreen Avenue building.

=== Bear Path School ===
Bear Path School also serves families living in the northern part of the Dunbar Hill area. It was renovated in the early 2000s to alleviate overcrowding throughout the system by adding more classrooms. The renovation was originally estimated at $14.28 million, with roughly 63.7% reimbursement expected from the state. This renovation also included the removal of asbestos, according to the New Haven Register. While kids returned to school in fall 2003, ongoing construction still required the use of temporary classrooms, according to the New Haven Register.

== Business ==
Hindinger Farm, a fourth-generation family farm established in the 1890s, is located off Dunbar Hill Road. Fresh produce grown on the farm's 120 acres is sold both at their farm stand as well as through their 24-week Community-supported agriculture (CSA) subscription program. The farm hosts an annual Strawberry Festival in June and a harvest festival in the autumn. The farm sends its fruit to local ice cream maker Kelly's Cone Connection for use.

WKCI-FM, WELI and WAVZ facilities and radio towers are located at Radio Tower Park on Benham Street across from Dunbar Hill School.

== Recreation ==
=== Paradise Game Preserve, Paradise Country Club, and Laurel View Country Club ===
A.C. Gilbert imported animals onto his property, Paradise Game Preserve, such as white-tail deer from Virginia. According to the New Haven Register, the 700-acre preserve at one time had 150 deer, seven fishing ponds, 2,500 pheasants and other birds. A log cabin also allowed visitors to stay on site. While Gilbert did allow shooting of the pheasants and ducks, he did not allow hunting of his herd of deer. By 1962, hunting on the site had ceased.

Gilbert also created man-made ponds, stocking them with fish and developing Paradise Park. Opening in 1947, the park was intended for employees of the A. C. Gilbert Company to use the park's amenities, which included a manmade swimming lake, a large field for athletics, a playground for children, and a lake for boating, according to Gilbert's autobiography.

After the first season, the Town of Hamden intervened, stating that Gilbert had been operating commercially within a residential zone. He took the case to the Connecticut Supreme Court but lost. The law specifically exempted "a community house or club", therefore the operations transferred to an association largely made up of Dunbar Hill residents, while Gilbert remained landowner and maintainer.

Today, Paradise Country Club has retained much of the same character and features as during A.C. Gilbert's ownership.

In the 1960s, part of A.C. Gilbert's property was developed into Laurel View Country Club.

=== Lake Wintergreen ===
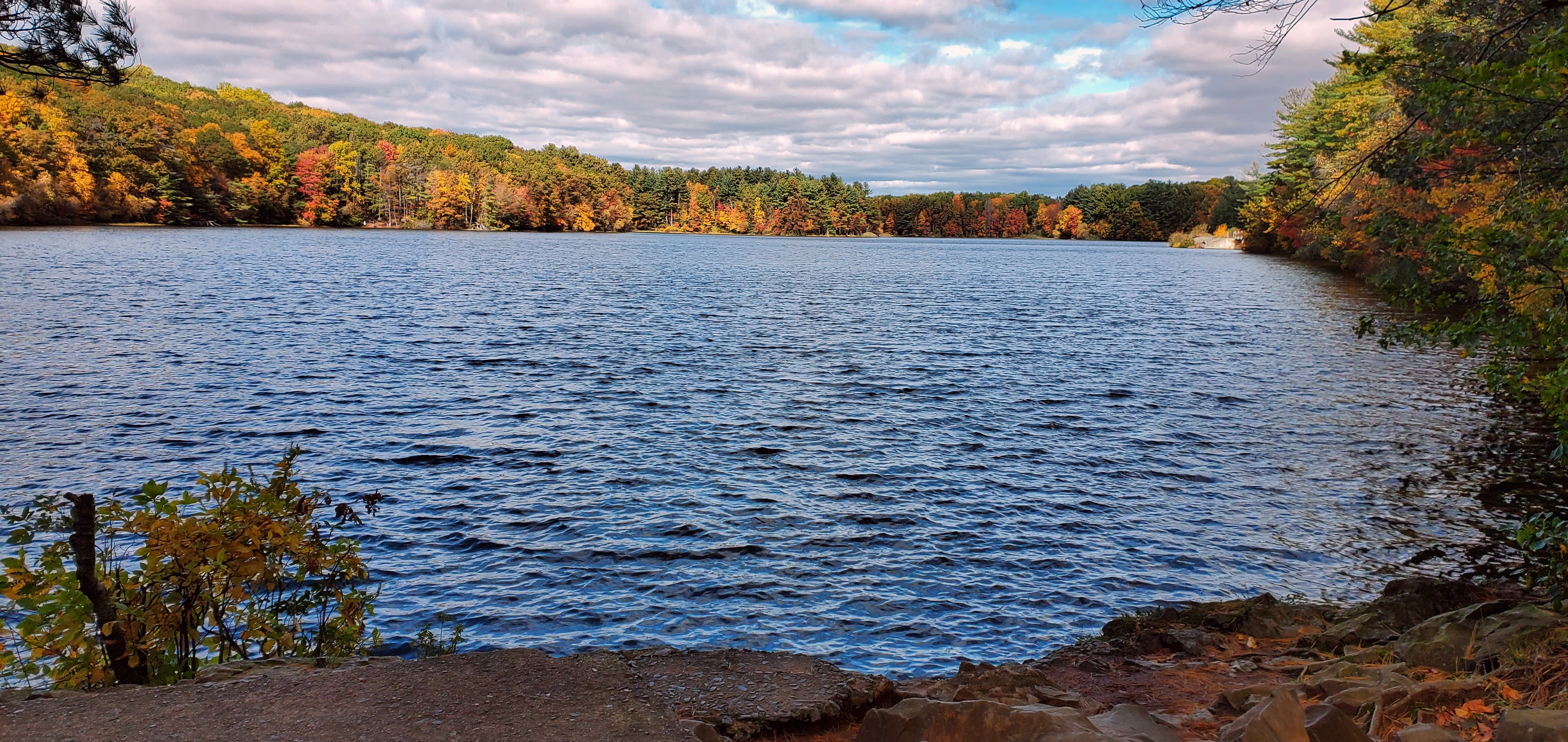
Lake Wintergreen, Hamden, Connecticut

A portion of West Rock Ridge State Park is accessible off two parking lots around Lake Wintergreen, with the Red and White Trails passing close to the lake itself. A boat launch is open year-round at the lake, and is located right off Main Street. Boats with internal combustion engines are not allowed on the lake.
