= WICC-TV =

Television station in Bridgeport, Connecticut (1953–1960)

- Bridgeport, Connecticut; United States
- Channels: Analog: 43 (UHF)

Programming
- Affiliations: ABC, DuMont (1953–1955)

Ownership
- Owner: Bridgeport Broadcasting Company

History
- First air date: March 29, 1953
- Last air date: 1960
- Call sign meaning: derived from sister station WICC radio

Technical information
- ERP: 18.3 kW
- HAAT: 213 m (700 ft)
- Transmitter coordinates: 41°16′46″N 73°11′09″W

WICC-TV (channel 43) was a television station in Bridgeport, Connecticut, United States. It operated from 1953 to 1960 from facilities on Booth Hill Road in Trumbull and was the second ultra high frequency (UHF) television station on the air in the state of Connecticut. Affiliated with ABC and the DuMont Television Network, WICC-TV failed to draw viewership amid heavy competition from more receivable very high frequency (VHF) stations. An attempt to return to the air as a station featuring printed news was dashed by a legal ruling, and the effort was abandoned in 1968; no investors were found for the otherwise completed facility, and the permit was surrendered in 1971.

== Construction and early years ==
With the end of the Federal Communications Commission (FCC)'s multi-year freeze on television station applications in 1952, Bridgeport, Connecticut, radio station WICC, by way of the Southern Connecticut and Long Island Television Company, applied to use channel 43 in the new ultra high frequency (UHF) band in June 1952. The application was swiftly granted on July 11 as part of the first group of 14 stations awarded after the freeze.

WICC-TV signed a contract for equipment in September 1952; two months later, it obtained a network affiliation with ABC, which was supplemented by programs from the DuMont Television Network. By February 1953, work was mostly complete on its transmitter site on Booth Hill Road, which served as studio facilities for WICC radio and television; work had been delayed by poor weather and late-arriving equipment. The first program went out on March 29, 1953, as the station joined ABC by rebroadcasting WABC-TV in New York City. The station formally debuted on April 12 with ceremonies led by Connecticut governor John Davis Lodge. Some of its technology, including the tower and UHF equipment, represented the first installation of such by its vendors.

In its early years, WICC produced a substantial amount of live programming, claiming to have more local programming than any UHF station in the region with a staff of just 16 employees. Beginning in October 1953, it began offering a selection of college courses from the University of Bridgeport. Students could watch versions of the courses Personal Adjustment in Family Living and Living with Literature and receive college credit. An anonymous donor offered "scholarships" to prospective students to pay part of the tuition as well as the cost of converting their television to receive UHF broadcasts. The station also telecast plays from local theater groups. WICC-TV became a broadcaster of Brooklyn Dodgers baseball in 1954, supplementing WOR-TV, whose signal was poor in the Bridgeport area. It was the first time any Bridgeport radio or TV station had carried baseball since 1938.

== UHF woes ==
As an early UHF station, WICC faced hurdles in viewer acceptance and reach of channel 43 from the start, competing against available very high frequency (VHF) signals. Existing television sets—of which there were an estimated 50,000 in the city—needed to be converted to receive the station. By June 1953, station management had claimed some 11,000 viewers now had converters or all-channel receivers capable of tuning in the station, but costs remained high for viewers to convert their sets. WICC radio also promoted the station with a weekly radio show featuring interviews with channel 43 personalities and highlights of the station's programming.

In November 1954, WICC-TV applied to the FCC seeking the use of VHF channel 6 with a directional antenna to cover primarily the Bridgeport area. At the time, not all TV stations were authorized to use directional antennas. Its attempt was denied in January 1956. WICC's owner, Philip Merryman, founded the Committee for Home Town Television in 1955 as a lobbying group for small-market stations; in February 1956, he testified before a U.S. Senate committee, noting that the station had lost money in every month in business and that his lone reason to continue was "the hope that something will be done to make it possible for me to compete on even terms with the VHF monopoly of the air". He noted that the structure of television allocations meant that many smaller communities that had their own daily newspapers and radio stations had to be served by TV stations in larger markets. WICC even offered use of its equipment to the state department of education on the condition that it receive approval to use VHF channel 3 at low power. At the time, the fate of channel 3, allocated to Hartford, was in dispute.

WICC radio and television were sold in 1958 to a group headed by Kenneth Cooper. Though the station reported its first-ever profitable month that year, celebrating by having the business manager climb the tower 250 feet (76 m) to celebrate the $250 in profit made, by this time it had little audience. By this time, the station was operating 4 1/2 hours a day with ABC programs; ABC retained its affiliation because it was cheap, paying a dollar an hour, and the parties were on good terms. While WICC radio was profitable, WICC-TV essentially operated on the unlikely chance that a VHF allocation was in the offing; Cooper told Broadcasting & Cable, "We're pouring $12,000 down the drain each year just on the outside chance that someday they might give us a V. It isn't likely, but it's a chance." Just one employee operated the station and accounted for most of its expenses. When he took a vacation in the summer of 1959, WICC-TV went off the air for two weeks without any viewer comment. That prompted a suspicion by Cooper that nobody was watching. As a result, he ran a contest during prime time: the first caller to the station would receive a $100 bill. The contest was announced 20 times. There were no calls. In December 1959, the station put out a news release declaring itself both the "poorest television station in the U.S." and the "only station in the U.S. without any viewers". The following September, to avoid competition from the VHF stations, WICC-TV shifted to a daytime operating schedule. In its first month on the air, it did not sell a single commercial.

== Attempted return to air ==
By the end of 1960, WICC-TV was off the air, unable to continue amid the competition. When the FCC sent WICC a letter in November 1964 ordering WICC to take effort to put the station back on the air or have its broadcast license canceled, WICC opted to take efforts to return channel 43 to service, citing the recent All-Channel Receiver Act that mandated new televisions be capable of receiving UHF stations. Later that year, Cooper bought out several minority stockholders in WICC's owner, Connecticut–New York Broadcasters.

Much of the equipment used in operating WICC-TV was still stored on Booth Hill and burned in a fire on February 1, 1966, along with the transmitter facilities for two FM radio stations on the site, co-owned WJZZ and WSHU-FM. Though the FCC denied an initial attempt to keep the license active, Cooper pressed forth with rebuilding channel 43 and replacing the lost equipment. Cooper sold off WICC radio to the New York Daily News later that year, retaining ownership of WJZZ and the channel 43 permit. The call sign for channel 43 was changed to WFTT.

Cooper's plan for WFTT involved a focus on news and civic programming. By March, Cooper had spent $500,000 on reactivating channel 43 and building an office for WJZZ and WFTT at the corner of Broad and Bank streets in Bridgeport. As late as May 1967, WFTT was announced to be returning to the air by July. However, Cooper's plans hit a snag. The proposed programming would have consisted of news teletype printed over music. At the time, the FCC required the audio and video portions of a television signal to be related and thus denied Cooper approval for the format. As a result, Cooper put the station on the market in September 1968. Cooper attempted to assign the construction permit to a company known as Limotharo, Inc., short for "the little mouse that roared", but no application was ever filed with the FCC. Even though the facility was ready to be activated, with no investors expressing interest, Cooper surrendered the permit, which the FCC canceled on July 20, 1971, ending the station's history.
