= WSHU =

WSHU may refer to:

- WSHU (AM), a radio station (1260 AM) licensed to Westport, Connecticut, United States
- WSHU-FM, a radio station (91.1 FM) licensed to Fairfield, Connecticut, United States
