= WDJZ (Connecticut) =

- Bridgeport, Connecticut; United States
- Broadcast area: Bridgeport, Connecticut
- Frequency: 1530 kHz

Ownership
- Owner: People's Broadcast Network, LLC

History
- First air date: April 30, 1977
- Last air date: February 1, 2016

Technical information
- Facility ID: 8516
- Class: D
- Power: 5,000 watts (daytime only)
- Transmitter coordinates: 41°10′9.3″N 73°13′12.4″W

WDJZ (1530 AM) was a radio station broadcasting a world ethnic format. Licensed to Bridgeport, Connecticut, United States, it served the Bridgeport area. The station was owned by People's Broadcast Network.

WDJZ went on the air April 30, 1977. The station was initially owned by road paving and construction executive Frank "Hi-Ho" Daddario and referred to itself on the air as "The Hi-Ho Spot On Your Dial". Daddario also owned the Hotel Hi-Ho. When he purchased a mall in downtown Bridgeport, he renamed it the "Hi Ho Center". His brother, Emilio Q. Daddario represented Connecticut in Congress and lost the Connecticut gubernatorial election of 1970. Daddario died in a plane crash in 1986. WDJZ was the first affiliate of the MOR Music Of Your Life format in the late 1970s.

In late January 2008, John Labarca began to broadcast his Italian program on Sunday mornings. Labarca used to host the weekday morning drive show and the "Italian House Party" on competitor WICC.

WDJZ went silent on February 1, 2016, after losing its transmitter site; by August, People's Broadcast Network had put the station up for sale. The station's license was canceled on February 2, 2017. Many of programs previously heard on WDJZ would return to the air in June 2016 on WNLK.
