= WNHC =

WNHC may refer to:

- WNHC-LP, a low-power radio station (104.1 FM) licensed to Lima, Ohio, United States
- WYBC (AM) 1340, a radio station licensed to New Haven, Connecticut, United States, which held the call sign WNHC from 1944 to 1998
- WTNH, a television station (channel 8 analog/10 digital) licensed to New Haven, Connecticut, United States, which held the call sign WNHC-TV from 1948 to 1971
- WPLR 99.1 FM, a radio station licensed to New Haven, Connecticut, United States, which held the call sign WNHC-FM from 1944 to 1970
