= WYBC =

WYBC may refer to:

- WYBC (AM), a radio station (1340 AM) licensed to New Haven, Connecticut, United States
- WYBC-FM, a radio station (94.3 FM) licensed to New Haven, Connecticut, United States
