= Enlisted Retention Board =

The Enlisted Retention Board is a tool used by United States Navy to break the enlistment contracts of mid-career enlisted Sailors (Sailors with 7 to 15 years of active military service). According to Mark Faram's story published in Navy Times on January 20, 2012, 2,947 Sailors were discharged from the United States NAVY via ERB as part of an effort to reduce personnel in 31 overmanned ratings. Assistant Secretary of the Navy (Manpower and Reserve Affairs), Juan M. Garcia III advised that though the primary criterion for ERB is sustained superior performance, the ERB contained both quota-based and performance-based elements.

Garcia's statement contradicts General Martin E. Dempsey's statement who, according to Alan Colmes (host of Alan Colmes Show) who appeared on a segment of Fox News on September 9, 2012, said that the board was actually performance based and the Sailors were discharged because they were not performing at the level they were supposed to. Dempsey's statement also contradicts Garcia's statement which insisted that "For ERB-eligible Sailors, this [ERB] should not be viewed as personal or reflected as poor performance, these are great Sailors (...)."

What makes the ERB process questionable from a legal stand point is the fact that according to US Congress military personnel cuts are legal only in one of two situations. One is if the military meets end strength. According to Lisa Wexler, an award-winning talk radio host and the creator and executive producer of The Lisa Wexler Show, this situation was not met. Secondly, the military is expected to offer voluntary discharges before involuntarily forcing personnel out of the military service.

The subject was first brought to the public through the SailorsagainstERB Facebook page. The page was created by one of the Navy spouses whose husband was not selected for retention by the Enlisted Retention Board. Not too long after that, the story was covered in November, in Navy Times, by Mark D. Faram.
