= WAVZ =

- New Haven, Connecticut; United States
- Broadcast area: Greater New Haven
- Frequency: 1300 kHz
- Branding: Fox Sports 1300

Programming
- Format: Sports radio
- Affiliations: Fox Sports Radio

Ownership
- Owner: iHeartMedia; (iHM Licenses, LLC)
- Sister stations: WELI; WKCI-FM

History
- First air date: 1947
- Former frequencies: 1260 kHz (1947–1957)
- Call sign meaning: "Waves" (previous handle)

Technical information
- Licensing authority: FCC
- Facility ID: 11920
- Class: B
- Power: 1,000 watts
- Transmitter coordinates: 41°17′16.3″N 72°56′46.4″W

Links
- Public license information: Public file; LMS
- Webcast: Listen live (via iHeartRadio)
- Website: foxsports1300.iheart.com

WAVZ (1300 AM) is a radio station broadcasting a sports radio format, licensed to serve New Haven, Connecticut, United States. The station is owned by iHeartMedia.

== History ==
WAVZ, as a news station, received the 1950 Alfred I. duPont Award, which was received by president Victor Knauth. WAVZ received a second duPont Award for its work in 1960.

The station, then owned by Kops-Monahan Communications, Inc. was formerly known as the New Waves, or Lucky 13 WAVZ (pronounced "waves") and was a popular Top 40 radio station in the 1960s and 1970s. In the 1950s, the station used a jingle with the following lyrics:

"There are waves in the navy and waves in your hair, and people wave their hands when they're going anywhere, but the greatest waves there can be are the radio waves on WAVZ".

During the 1960s, WAVZ competed with WDEE (1220, now WATX), and later with WNHC (1340, now WYBC) for radio listeners. WAVZ generally won most of the rating "books".

As FM radio became more popular, the station's rock music format was shifted to sister FM station WKCI in 1979 by Curtis Hanson and Pete Salant. WKCI had been an easy-listening station but in the summer of 1979 became "KC-101" and began playing adult contemporary music using many of the then current WAVZ personalities. Due to the success of KC101, Pete Salant a/k/a Pete Stone on WAVZ, left New Haven, Connecticut in 1981 to program WYNY in New York City. WAVZ became one of the first Music of Your Life stations, airing big band and adult standards. WAVZ and WKCI were sold to Eastern Broadcasting of Washington, D.C., on June 5, 1982. Upon the sale of the radio stations, Curtis W. Hansen left in 1982 to create WEBE in Westport, Connecticut.

Prior to its current format, the station was a progressive talk radio station, affiliated with Air America.

On January 1, 2024, WAVZ switched affiliations from ESPN Radio to Fox Sports Radio and rebranded as "Fox Sports 1300".
