= Chooch =

Chooch may refer to:

== Fictional characters ==
- Chooch, in Van Nuys Blvd. (film)
- Chooch, in Up the Academy
- Chooch, played by Joe Lo Truglio in Last Man Running
- Chooch, son of Shane Scully
- Choo-Choo, or Chooch, a Top Cat character
- Chooch, in Salty's Lighthouse

== People ==
- Carlos Ruiz (baseball) (born 1979), nicknamed Chooch, a Panamanian former professional baseball catcher
- Charles "Chooch" Sergio, a member of the band Lemon Demon
- Sam Tsoutsouvas (American football) (1917–1989), nicknamed Chooch
- Chris “Pauly D” Figueroa (born 2003), professional Choochie

== Other uses ==
- "Chooch", a song on the 1955 Frank Morgan (album) by Frank Morgan
- Chooch (film), a film shot in Stamford, Connecticut
