= Groomit =

Pet grooming service

- Company type: Private
- Founded: 2017; 9 years ago
- Founders: Sohel Kapadia; Anna Zege; Tino Patel; Lars Rissmann
- Headquarters: Yonkers, New York, U.S.
- Area served: New York City; New Jersey; Connecticut; Florida; Georgia; Texas; Arizona; Colorado; Long Island, New York; Westchester County, New York
- Services: Pet grooming
- Website: www.groomit.me

Groomit is an American company which operates the first app for dog and cat owners to schedule in-home and mobile pet grooming for their pets. Groomit was founded in 2016 in Yonkers, New York and launched the app in 2017. It currently serves communities in New Jersey, Connecticut, New York City, Westchester County, New York, Long Island, New York, Miami, Fort Lauderdale, Orlando, Tampa, Naples, Dallas, Austin Atlanta, Boston, Philadelphia, Denver, Phoenix, San Antonio and Houston. The company is formally operated as Groomit for Pets, LLC.

Groomit offers a marketplace of pet stylists and groomers that pet owners can connect with for a variety of services including haircuts, shampoos, nail clippings, and ear cleanings.

== History ==
Groomit was launched in 2016, offering its services in the New York City metropolitan area, including Connecticut, New Jersey, and Westchester County, New York. Its headquarters is based in Yonkers, just north of New York City.

In June 2017, Groomit launched its mobile app.

In May 2018, Groomit expanded to San Diego, California.

In May 2021, Groomit introduced mobile grooming, besides in-home service, and is expanding into more markets.

== Services ==
Groomit offers a network of groomers and stylists for users to schedule appointments with through the app. Groomit meets with each groomer in person, verifies skill level, and conducts background checks before they are eligible to make in-home and mobile grooming appointments. Each appointment is insured by Groomit and the company offers training sessions for new groomers.

Groomit offers silver, eco, and gold packages for both cats and dogs.

== Notable users ==
In June 2019, former Real Housewives of New York City star Jill Zarin was spotted using the app by OK! Magazine.
