= WICC-FM =

Radio station in Southport, Connecticut

Simulcasting with WICC Bridgeport
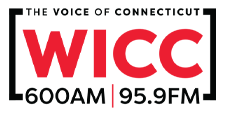
- Southport, Connecticut; United States
- Broadcast area: Greater Bridgeport
- Frequency: 95.9 MHz (HD Radio)
- Branding: WICC 600 AM and 95.9 FM

Programming
- Language: English
- Format: Talk radio
- Affiliations: ABC News Radio

Ownership
- Owner: Connoisseur Media; (Connoisseur Media Licenses, LLC)
- Sister stations: WEBE; WEZN-FM; WICC; WPLR; WYBC-FM

History
- First air date: 1966
- Former call signs: WDRN (1966–1975); WNLK-FM (1975–1976); WLYQ (1976–1988); WGMX (1988–1989); WEFX (1989–2006); WFOX (2006–2026)
- Call sign meaning: derived from WICC (AM)

Technical information
- Licensing authority: FCC
- Facility ID: 14379
- Class: A
- ERP: 3,000 watts
- HAAT: 91.1 meters (299 ft)
- Transmitter coordinates: 41°6′56.4″N 73°26′4.4″W

Links
- Public license information: Public file; LMS
- Website: www.voiceofct.com/home

WICC-FM (95.9 FM) is a radio station broadcasting a talk radio format, simulcast with WICC (600 AM). Licensed to serve Southport, Connecticut, the station is owned by Connoisseur Media. The WICC-FM studios are located on Wheelers Farms Road in Milford, and its transmitter is located on Shirley Street in Norwalk.

== History ==
WICC-FM signed on in 1966 as WDRN.

In 1976, it changed its call letters to WLYQ, meaning "We Like You". Branded "Q96", it carried a Top 40 format.

In April 2006, the call sign was changed from WEFX to WFOX.

On May 13, 2019, WFOX relaunched its classic rock format with a playlist centered on rock from the 1980s to the 2000s.

On September 3, 2024, following a week-long "The History of Alternative Rock" feature, WFOX dropped its rock format in favor of a simulcast of talk-formatted sister station WICC (600 AM). None of WFOX's on-air staff was let go, as the Chaz & AJ morning show was simulcast from WPLR in New Haven and the midday and afternoon hosts had other duties with Connoisseur Media. The WICC simulcast was in part prompted by the end of the all-news format of WCBS in New York City; concurrently with the start of the simulcast, WICC began carrying CBS Radio Network newscasts, announced the hiring of former WCBS anchor Brigitte Quinn to host an early afternoon show, and relaunched as "The Voice of Connecticut".Quinn's program, Newsline, lasted six weeks before being replaced by The Download, which is hosted by WICC reporters Jon Kamal (WFOX's former midday host, who also produces and hosts for WEZN-FM and WPLR) and Chris Williams. The call sign was changed to WICC-FM on February 1, 2026; the WFOX call sign moved to another Connoisseur station, WFOX.
