= WSUF =

Simulcasts WSHU, Westport, Connecticut
- Noyack, New York; United States
- Broadcast area: Eastern Long Island; Southeastern Connecticut
- Frequency: 89.9 MHz (HD Radio)

Programming
- Format: Public broadcasting
- Subchannels: HD2: Classical music
- Affiliations: American Public Media; NPR; Public Radio Exchange

Ownership
- Owner: Sacred Heart University
- Sister stations: WSHU; WSHU-FM; WSTC

History
- First air date: October 1, 1993
- Call sign meaning: Suffolk County

Technical information
- Licensing authority: FCC
- Facility ID: 58516
- Class: B1
- ERP: 1,900 watts (hor.); 12,000 watts (ver.)
- HAAT: 109 meters (358 ft)
- Transmitter coordinates: 41°6′35.4″N 72°22′3.3″W
- Translator: See § Translators

Links
- Public license information: Public file; LMS
- Website: www.wshu.org

WSUF (89.9 FM) is a radio station licensed to Noyack, New York, and serving the eastern Long Island and southeastern Connecticut areas. It is owned by Sacred Heart University.

It broadcasts a news/talk radio and classical music format that includes programming from NPR, Public Radio International, and American Public Media. For most of the time, it acts as a full satellite of WSHU, though on Sunday mornings and afternoons it simulcasts WSHU-FM's classical programming.

The station was assigned the WSUF call letters by the Federal Communications Commission on October 1, 1993.

== Translators ==
Call sign	Frequency	City of license	State	FID	Relays
W227AJ	93.3 FM	Northford	Connecticut	43526	WSUF-HD1
W289AD	105.7 FM	Selden	New York	58508	WSUF-HD1
W298BN	107.5 FM	Noyack	New York	58518	WSUF-HD2

== See also ==
- WSHU (AM) — 1260 AM, licensed to Westport, Connecticut
- WSHU-FM — 91.1 FM, licensed to Fairfield, Connecticut
