= Secrets of a Jewish Mother =

Book by Jill Zarin, Lisa Wexler, and Gloria Kamen

Secrets of a Jewish Mother: Real Advice, Real Stories, Real Love
- Author: Jill Zarin, Lisa Wexler, and Gloria Kamen
- Language: English
- Genre: Non-fiction
- Publication date: 2010

Secrets of a Jewish Mother: Real Advice, Real Stories, Real Love is a Jewish secular culture book, published in 2010, written by Jill Zarin, Lisa Wexler, and Gloria Kamen. (Jill Zarin was one of the women featured on the TV reality show The Real Housewives of New York City.) The book comprises recipes, advice, and parenting tips. The first paperback copies came out on March 1, 2011. The book has been the source of some controversy because of a positive good review being posted to Amazon, allegedly by Zarin under a pseudonym.

== Critical reception ==
Secrets of a Jewish Mother has received considerable media attention. The book received an award from the Connecticut Press Association and was also translated into Chinese, Russian and Japanese.

== See also ==
- Gribenes
- Yenta
