= Lisa Wexler =

American lawyer

- Born: Woodmere, New York
- Education: The Johns Hopkins University (B.A., 1981)
- Alma mater: The New York University School of Law (J.D., 1984)
- Occupations: Judge, attorney, and talk radio host
- Relatives: Jill Zarin (sister)

Lisa Wexler is a Connecticut Probate Judge, an attorney, an award-winning talk radio host and the creator and executive producer of The Lisa Wexler Show, which airs weekdays 10 a.m. - noon on WICC 600, a Connoisseur Media station. Lisa Wexler is currently serving her fourth term as Probate Judge for the Westport/Weston Judicial District in Connecticut. In 2022, she won as a Democrat, having won the prior three elections as a Republican. She won with over 72 percent of the vote. In 2013, She ran as a Republican and won in Westport by a 58 percent to 42 percent margin. In Weston, Wexler won by 55 to 45 percent. In November 2014, Lisa Wexler was re-elected as Probate Judge for a four-year term. In November 2018, Lisa Wexler was re-elected again and is currently serving a four-year term.

== Early life and education ==
Lisa Wexler was born and raised in Woodmere, New York. She graduated from Lawrence High School, a public school located in Lawrence, New York. She graduated with Honors from The Johns Hopkins University with a Bachelor of Arts in Political Science in 1981. She received her Juris Doctor from The New York University School of Law in 1984, where she won the American Jurisprudence Award for Excellence in Constitutional Law. She entered the New York Bar in 1985 and the Connecticut Bar in 1991.

== Legal career ==
During law school, Wexler worked for the Real Estate Finance Division of the New York State Attorney General. Immediately after law school, Wexler joined the law firm of Milbank, Tweed, Hadley & McCloy as an associate. In 1987, Wexler established her own law firm, originally based in Irvington, New York and later in Westport, CT. Primary areas of practice included contracts, commercial and residential real estate, and trusts, estates and probate matters. In 2013, in a special election, Wexler won a contested election for Probate Judge for District 50, Westport/Weston for a one-year term. She ran unopposed in 2014 and is currently serving a four-year term.

Lisa Wexler is currently serving on the Connecticut Juvenile Justice Policy Oversight Committee ("JJPOC") Commission for Juvenile Justice, a committee authorized by statute to report to the legislature on recommendations to reform the Connecticut juvenile justice system. She is serving her third year on the committee.

Lisa Wexler also served on the Westport Planning and Zoning Commission from 1997-1999 and was elected to the Westport Zoning Board of Appeals, serving from 1999–2003.

== Broadcasting career ==
Seeking a career in radio, Wexler completed the curriculum of the Connecticut School of Broadcasting in January 2006. She began her own show on September 30, 2006, airing on Cox Radio's 1400 WSTC/1350 WNLK in Fairfield County, Connecticut. Governor Jodi Rell was the first guest. The show grew from a 60-minute format on Saturday mornings to airing five days a week during the primetime slot of 4-6 PM. The show is a news-talk format that discusses local, national, and international news, entertainment, and culture. The show was also broadcast on WYBC- Yale Broadcasting, in 2008, and on WFAS-AM, a Cumulus station, from December 2011- June 2015. It was broadcast daily from 4-6 PM EST on AM 1490 WGCH in Greenwich, a Forte Family broadcaster until August 2019. On August 5, 2019, The Lisa Wexler Show moved to WICC600, a Connoisseur media station.

== Writing career ==
Along with her mother Gloria Kamen and sister Jill Zarin, Lisa co-authored Secrets of a Jewish Mother, a Jewish secular culture book published in April 2010 (Penguin/Dutton). The award-winning book was also published in Japanese, Russian and Chinese, as well as in a paperback edition.

== Community service ==
Wexler has been a resident of Westport, Connecticut since 1989. She served on the board of directors of the Jewish Community Centers in Norwalk, Westport, Wilton, Weston, and Bridgeport for a number of years. She currently serves on the board of directors of the Jeffrey Modell Foundation for Primary Immunodeficiency Research and serves on the Advisory Board of Jane Doe No More, a non-profit devoted to erasing the stigma of sexual assault. Wexler is also a founding member of the Connecticut chapter of Women in Power, which hosts several events each year devoted to educating and empowering women in their personal and professional lives. Lisa is a lifetime member of Hadassah and an active member of the Weston Kiwanis.
