= WYBC-FM =

Radio station in New Haven, Connecticut

- New Haven, Connecticut; United States
- Broadcast area: Greater New Haven
- Frequency: 94.3 MHz
- Branding: 94.3 WYBC

Programming
- Format: Urban adult contemporary
- Affiliations: Compass Media Networks

Ownership
- Owner: Yale Broadcasting Company
- Operator: Connoisseur Media
- Sister stations: WEBE; WEZN-FM; WICC; WICC-FM; WPLR; WYBC

History
- First air date: 1959
- Call sign meaning: Yale Broadcasting Company

Technical information
- Licensing authority: FCC
- Facility ID: 74322
- Class: A
- ERP: 3,000 watts horizontal; 2,600 watts vertical
- HAAT: 144 meters (472 ft)
- Transmitter coordinates: 41.350°N 72.973°W

Links
- Public license information: Public file; LMS
- Website: www.943wybc.com/home

WYBC-FM (94.3 MHz) is an urban adult contemporary radio station, licensed to serve New Haven, Connecticut. The station is owned by Yale Broadcasting Company and operated through a local marketing agreement (LMA) with Connoisseur Media as of May 10, 2013. Through the LMA, most of WYBC-FM's programming originates from Connoisseur's facilities located on Wheelers Farms Road in Milford. Its transmitter is located in West Rock Ridge State Park in New Haven.

== History ==
WYBC-FM signed on in 1959.
