= Music of Your Life =

Syndicated music radio format

Music of Your Life is an American syndicated music radio format featuring adult standards music. First created by recording executive Al Ham in 1978, the format achieved popularity in the 1980s among AM radio stations in the United States and Canada, which were then facing declines in listenership in a transition period of most popular music to the FM band.

The format's peak was before the 1987 repeal of the FCC's Fairness Doctrine began the transition of many of the stations on the AM band towards mostly conservative talk radio and sports radio, a process that accelerated after the Telecommunications Act of 1996 relaxed ownership restrictions and made large radio chains with a de facto national talk schedule with little local deviation possible. The consolidation of the radio industry, the launch of Internet radio and music streaming services allowing broader personal access to music anytime, and the overall aging out of the network's audience from prime advertising demographics brought the Music of Your Life format into a decline where only twelve stations used the format in 2008, when it was purchased by its current owner, Marc Angell.

== History ==
Al Ham, a veteran CBS Records executive, decided to change careers in 1978 and started Music of Your Life, a format featuring pre-rock popular music on station WDJZ in Bridgeport, Connecticut. After that station was sold, the format was then installed at two other stations in the region: WHLI in Hempstead, New York, and WMAS in Springfield, Massachusetts, which was the first syndication customer. Both stations saw immediate and major gains in ratings, particularly among older listeners. Ham credited its success to the disenfranchisement of listeners aged 35–64 by most music stations. By 1981, more than 60 stations had adopted the live and automated versions of Music of Your Life, and their ranks had swelled to 130 by 1982. It was particularly credited with providing ratings improvement for AM stations whose listeners had deserted to FM outlets and was a good fit for AM as most older songs were not recorded in stereo; at the time, AM stereo was not in use. In contrast to "beautiful music" stations that mostly programmed instrumentals, the Music of Your Life format emphasized vocals; 20 percent of the music mix consisted of big band selections. Ham promoted listener involvement by starting "Music of Your Life Clubs", an idea that caught on.

A number of heritage contemporary hit radio stations on the AM band converted to Music of Your Life during the decade. WOKY in Milwaukee became a Music of Your Life station in January 1982, a switch that made the front page of Radio & Records. CKLW in Windsor, Ontario, also serving Detroit, changed in December 1984 and saw ratings immediately improve from a 0.8 in the fall 1984 Arbitron survey to 4.0 in the spring 1985 book; it was one of 10 Canadian stations using the format, though CKLW tinkered with it slightly to provide a contemporary enough sound to support its overall programming. WNJY serving Palm Beach County, Florida, co-owned with WMAS, was the first FM affiliate, signing on in 1983; advertising rates doubled after the format was installed. In 1985, a Music of Your Life television special hosted by Toni Tennille was produced as a pilot for a possible series. However, automated music formats on tape began to fall out of favor in the mid-1980s, and interest in Music of Your Life waned.

In 1989, Unistar Radio Networks entered into a joint venture with Fairwest Satellite Programming to distribute Music of Your Life. However, the satellite service was unsuccessful. Unistar terminated satellite delivery in 1991, with about 50 clients, finding Music of Your Life "not economically viable for satellite delivery", though it would continue to distribute it on tapes. After Unistar's decision to cease satellite delivery, Al Ham bought back all assets related to Music of Your Life in March 1991. He continued the tape business while offering the use of the brand and jingles to stations carrying competing satellite-delivered standards formats such as Unistar's AM Only and Stardust from Satellite Music Networks.

On January 1, 1996, the format was relaunched by Ham along with original partners Jim West and Gary Fink as a satellite-delivered service, with Gary Owens hosting mornings. By 1999, Jones Radio Network, which handled syndication duties, boasted it had 174 stations signed up and such talent as Owens, Patti Page, and Wink Martindale. The satellite delivery allowed Music of Your Life to compete with similar offerings from competitors, such as AM Only from Westwood One and Stardust from ABC Radio Networks; the service also gradually introduced newer music. Interest slowly waned, and there were just twelve stations remaining in 2008, by which time Marc Angell had become CEO.

== See also ==
- WRME-LD, the Chicago flagship of the national "MeTV FM" radio network, which shares a similar format to Music of Your Life, though without celebrity on-air talent
