= WELI =

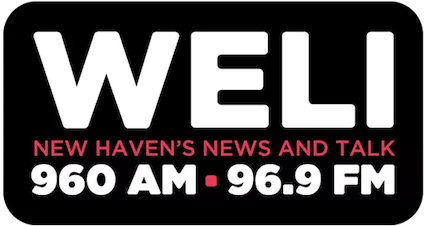
- New Haven, Connecticut; United States
- Broadcast area: Greater New Haven; Greater Bridgeport
- Frequency: 960 kHz
- Branding: WELI 960 AM and 96.9 FM

Programming
- Language: English
- Format: Talk radio
- Affiliations: Compass Media Networks; Fox News Radio; Premiere Networks

Ownership
- Owner: iHeartMedia, Inc.; (iHM Licenses, LLC)
- Sister stations: WAVZ; WKCI-FM

History
- First air date: October 13, 1935
- Call sign meaning: Yale University's popular nickname "The Eli", the station being in the university's home city.

Technical information
- Licensing authority: FCC
- Facility ID: 11933
- Class: B
- Power: 5,000 watts
- Transmitter coordinates: 41°22′14.35″N 72°56′13.37″W
- Translator: 96.9 W245DK (New Haven)
- Repeater: 101.3 WKCI-FM HD3 (Hamden)

Links
- Public license information: Public file; LMS
- Webcast: Listen live (via iHeartRadio)
- Website: 960weli.iheart.com

WELI (960 kHz) is a commercial radio station licensed to serve New Haven, Connecticut. It broadcasts a news/talk radio format and is owned by iHeartMedia, Inc. The WELI studios are located in Radio Towers Park on Benham Street in Hamden, and its transmitter site is also at this location.

By day, WELI is powered at 5,000 watts non-directional, to protect other stations on or near 960 AM from interference at night, it uses a directional antenna with a four-tower array. Its AM signal covers the New Haven and Bridgeport areas. Programming is also heard on 215 watt FM translator W245DK at 96.9 MHz.

== History ==
=== Early years ===
WELI signed on the air in October 1935 as a daytimer on 900 kHz, powered at 500 watts and required to go off the air at night. The station was owned by the City Broadcasting Corporation, with studios at 221 Orange Street in New Haven. With the station located in the same city as Yale University, whose sports teams are nicknamed "The Elis", the station chose WELI for its call sign. Over the years, the station broadcast live Yale Bulldogs or Elis sports, since many of its listeners have been Yale students, faculty and alumni.

With the enactment of the North American Regional Broadcasting Agreement (NARBA) in 1941, WELI and most other radio stations, were required to move to a different frequency. It switched to 960 kHz, getting night time authorization. It was powered at 1,000 watts by day, 500 watts at night. WELI was a network affiliate of the Mutual Broadcasting System, carrying its dramas, comedies, news and sports during the "Golden Age of Radio".

=== Shows in the 1930s, 40s and 50s ===
In its early decades, WELI had local musicians play live music. A weekly program Poetry and an Organ, broadcast in the late 1930s, starred organist Don Raphael. Other musicians heard regularly on WELI in the 1930s and 1940s included organist Marion J. Reynolds, who was the station's musical director since its first day, pianist Margaret Shepard, the Esther String Trio, the Continental Trio directed by violinist Sy Byer, Ray Block's Swing Fourteen, and Charles Magnante's accordion quartet. The Polish Eagles Radio Show, featuring Polish language and Polish instrumental music and hosted by Victor Zembruski, aired every Sunday on WELI during the 1950s. The station's singers included Millicent Scott, Edith Jolson, and Louise DeMars. Dick Carlson hosted the record request and dedication show Danceland Ballroom.

WELI also had Italian language shows. George Mazzacane's 2-hour-long L'Ora Italiana, aired on WELI for seven years until his death in 1943, included Italian opera records and news about Italy and Italians relevant to the local Italian American community. George Padovini and Luigi diFant presented news in Italian.

Other local shows regularly heard on WELI in its early years included What Are You Reading? with Elida Sterling, about novels, Stories of the Stars with Lewis Doolittle, about astronomy, and Theater News on the Air about live performances. WELI also aired many local sports games and tournaments, including tennis, golf, basketball, and baseball. Meet the Eagles was hosted by Wilf Cude, the goalie of the local professional ice hockey team, the New Haven Eagles.

=== Clear Channel ownership ===
In 1984, Clear Channel Communications, the forerunner of iHeartMedia, acquired WELI. For much of the 1960s and 1970s, WELI had a full service, middle of the road format of popular adult music, news, talk and sports. But with Clear Channel ownership, the station scaled back its music programming, adding more talk shows. By the 1990s, WELI had made the transition to an all-talk station.

Jerry Kristafer was the host for The WELI Morning Show from 1998 until 2008 when he moved to WDRC-FM in Hartford. The show was replaced by the syndicated Imus in the Morning show from WABC in New York City. In 1998, WELI again began broadcast college football games of the Yale Bulldogs.

WELI had carried The Rush Limbaugh Show from noon to 3 p.m. for many years. Limbaugh died in February 2021 and WELI aired repeats of Limbaugh's show for several months. When it was discontinued in June 2021, the station replaced it with The Clay Travis and Buck Sexton Show. Other national shows formerly heard on WELI include The Mark Levin Show, The Savage Nation with Michael Savage, The Laura Ingraham Show, Kim Komando Computer Show, Dr. Dean Edell, and Jim Cramer's Real Money Talk.

== Programming ==
Weekdays begin with a news and interview show, "The Vinnie Penn Project", simulcast on co-owned WPOP in Hartford. The rest of the weekday schedule includes nationally syndicated talk shows, mostly from Premiere Networks: The Glenn Beck Program, The Sean Hannity Show, The Clay Travis and Buck Sexton Show, The Jesse Kelly Show, Coast to Coast AM with George Noory and This Morning, America's First News with Gordon Deal from Compass Media Networks. World and national news comes from Fox News Radio with WELI newscasters supplying Connecticut news for both WELI and WPOP.

On weekends, WELI airs syndicated shows including At Home with Gary Sullivan, Sunday Night Live with Bill Cunningham and Somewhere in Time with Art Bell, as well as repeats of weekday shows. WELI Sports Director George DeMaio Jr. hosts a Saturday morning show.

== Translator ==
Call sign	Frequency	City of license	FID	ERP (W)	Class	Transmitter coordinates	FCC info
W245DK	96.9 FM	New Haven, Connecticut	202570	215	D	42°25′22.2″N 71°57′4.9″W	LMS
