= Jill Zarin =

American socialite and television personality

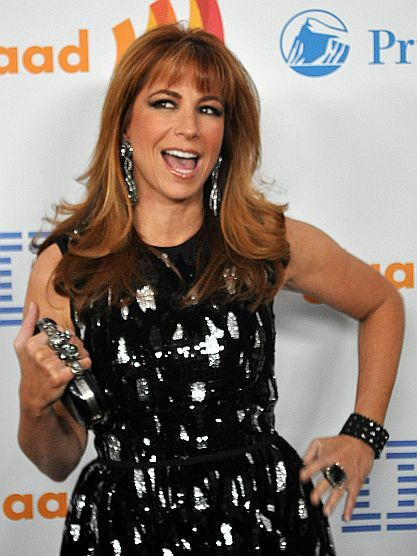
- Zarin in 2010
- Born: Woodmere, New York, U.S.
- Education: Simmons University (BA)
- Occupations: Television personality; businesswoman; author
- Spouses: Steven Shapiro (m. 1987; div. 1998) Bobby Zarin (m. 2000; died 2018)
- Partner: Gary Brody (2018–present)
- Children: 1
- Relatives: Lisa Wexler (sister)

Jill Zarin is an American television personality and businesswoman. She is best known as an original cast member on the Bravo reality television series The Real Housewives of New York City, in which she starred from 2008 to 2011.

== Early life ==
Zarin was born in Woodmere, New York, to Saul and Gloria Kamen. She graduated from Simmons University in 1985 with a degree in retail management.

== Career ==
Upon graduating, Zarin became an assistant buyer at Filene's department store, and later the vice president of Great American Knitting Mills. In 2008, Zarin was announced as one of five women cast to appear in the Bravo network reality series, The Real Housewives of New York City, the second installment Bravo's Real Housewives franchise. According to Jill, she was approached by a producer after they saw a picture of her, her husband Bobby, and her daughter Ally on the New York Social Diary website, and asked if she was interested in doing a reality show based on "glamorous Manhattan moms and their children," to which she agreed in order to gain exposure for her and her husband's fabric store, Zarin Fabric Warehouse.

In 2010, Zarin published the book Secrets of a Jewish Mother with her mother and sister. The following year, she, along with Kelly Bensimon and Alex McCord, were fired from the series. In late 2012, Zarin launched her jewelry line, Jill Zarin Jewelry Collection, which was sold at Macy's and Lord & Taylor.

In June 2022, Zarin appeared in the Peacock Real Housewives spin-off The Real Housewives Ultimate Girls Trip. In 2024, she took part in the Amazon Freevee reality series The Goat, where she was exiled in episode 10.

On February 3, 2026, it was announced Zarin, along with several alumni from The Real Housewives of New York City, would appear in a new series. Produced by E! under the working title The Golden Life, the series follows the lives of Bensimon, Luann de Lesseps, Sonja Morgan, Ramona Singer, and Dorinda Medley as they navigate their "golden" years together in Palm Beach, Florida. Seven days later, Zarin was fired from the series, following her criticism of the Super Bowl LX halftime show and its headliner, Bad Bunny.

== Personal life ==
Zarin married Steven Shapiro in 1987; they divorced in 1998. Zarin married Bobby Zarin in 2000; he died in 2018 at the age of 71. She has one daughter, Allyson Shapiro, who was conceived via a sperm donor during her first marriage. Since 2018, Zarin has been dating businessman Gary Brody, and as of June 2022, she lives in Boca Raton, Florida.

Zarin received backlash from fans and other reality television stars after calling Bad Bunny's performance at the Super Bowl LX halftime show the "worst halftime show ever." In an Instagram video, which she later deleted, she expressed disappointment that the show was in Spanish and that there were "literally no white people in the entire thing".

== Bibliography ==
- Zarin, Jill; Wexler, Lisa; Kamen, Gloria (2010). Secrets of a Jewish Mother: Real Advice, Real Stories, Real Love. Dutton Adult.
