= WEBE =

Radio station in Westport, Connecticut

- Westport, Connecticut; United States
- Broadcast area: Fairfield County; Greater New Haven; North Shore (Long Island)
- Frequency: 107.9 MHz (HD Radio)
- Branding: WEBE108

Programming
- Language: English
- Format: Adult contemporary
- Subchannels: HD2: Talk radio (WICC)

Ownership
- Owner: Connoisseur Media; (Connoisseur Media Licenses, LLC)
- Sister stations: WEZN-FM; WICC; WICC-FM; WPLR; WYBC-FM

History
- First air date: September 1, 1962
- Former call signs: WMMM-FM (1962–1970); WDJF (1970–1984)
- Call sign meaning: phonetically pronounced as "Wee-Bee"

Technical information
- Licensing authority: FCC
- Facility ID: 71389
- Class: B
- ERP: 20,500 watts
- HAAT: 202 meters (663 ft)
- Transmitter coordinates: 41°16′44.3″N 73°11′6.4″W

Links
- Public license information: Public file; LMS
- Webcast: Listen live
- Website: www.webe108.com/home

WEBE (107.9 FM) is a commercial radio station licensed to serve Westport, Connecticut, airing an adult contemporary format branded as "WEBE108". Owned by Connoisseur Media, the station's signal covers both the Greater New Haven and Fairfield County areas. The WEBE studios are located on Wheelers Farms Road in Milford, and its transmitter is located on Video Lane in Shelton.

== History ==
The frequency of 107.9 MHz was originally assigned by the Federal Communications Commission to Westport, Connecticut, under its Table of Allocations. On September 1, 1962, WMMM-FM signed on the air as the FM counterpart to WMMM (now WSHU). WMMM-AM-FM were owned by the Westport Broadcasting Company headed by Sydney J. Flamm. WMMM was a daytimer station. When it went off the air at sunset each evening, WMMM-FM allowed its programming to continue to be heard.

The stations broadcast out of offices and studios located above a deli at 163 Main Street in Westport. The broadcasting antenna for 107.9 FM was located in a residential neighborhood in Wilton. The power was 5,200 watts, a fraction of its current output, with an antenna height above average terrain (HAAT) of 79 feet (24 m), so the broadcast radius of the station was limited.

In 1970, WMMM-FM got the new call sign WDJF. The FM station continued to simulcast WMMM for a few more years, and would later switch to an automated adult contemporary format. The station's power was increased to 50,000 watts of power, and relocated to a taller tower.

In 1984, the station was acquired by a company known as "The 108 Radio Company Ltd. Partnership", and would switch the call letters to WEBE. In addition, automation was ended and live DJs handled most air shifts. In 1987, the ownership changed to a company calling itself "WEBE Associates". In 2000, ownership changed again, this time to Nassau Broadcasting LLC. Cumulus Media acquired Nassau Broadcasting in March 2002. Cumulus also owned WICC.

On April 15, 2019, Cumulus Media announced that WEBE and WICC would be swapped to Connoisseur Media, which began operating the stations under a local marketing agreement (LMA) on May 1, 2019. The swap was consummated on June 26, 2019.

== HD radio ==
Cumulus Broadcasting began upgrading its stations to HD Radio broadcasting in 2005. One of the first ten stations to get changed to HD transmission was WEBE. WEBE's HD2 subchannel carries the talk format heard on co-owned WICC.
