= WNLK =

- Norwalk, Connecticut; United States
- Broadcast area: Fairfield County
- Frequency: 1350 kHz
- Branding: Veritas Catholic Radio

Programming
- Format: Catholic radio

Ownership
- Owner: Veritas Catholic Network, Inc.

History
- First air date: April 7, 1948
- Call sign meaning: "Norwalk"

Technical information
- Licensing authority: FCC
- Facility ID: 14378
- Class: B
- Power: 1,000 watts (day); 500 watts (night)
- Transmitter coordinates: 41°6′54.3″N 73°26′4.4″W
- Translator: 103.9 W280FX (Norwalk)

Links
- Public license information: Public file; LMS
- Website: www.veritascatholic.com

WNLK (1350 AM; "Veritas Catholic Radio") is a listener-supported, non-commercial radio station licensed to Norwalk, Connecticut, and serving Fairfield County. It broadcasts Catholic radio programming and is owned by the Veritas Catholic Network, Inc.

By day, WNLK is powered at 1,000 watts non-directional. At night, to avoid interference to other stations on 1350 AM, it reduces power to 500 watts using a directional antenna. Programming is also heard on FM translator W280FX at 103.9 MHz.

== History ==
The station signed on the air on April 7, 1948. It was owned by the Norwalk Broadcasting Company with studios on Main Street at Wall Street. It has been assigned the WNLK call letters by the Federal Communications Commission since it was first licensed.

WNLK and WSTC (1400 AM) in Stamford were sold by Cox Radio, Inc. in 2011 to Sacred Heart University, which initially operated them via a local marketing agreement (LMA). Prior to the sale, WNLK and WSTC simulcast a commercial news/talk format. When the university acquired WNLK, it used the station to air its public radio service. On January 25, 2016, WNLK dropped its public radio simulcast with WSHU (1260 AM) and went silent. When it returned to the air on June 1, 2016, it carried a brokered Christian radio format.

In August 2019, WNLK was acquired by the Veritas Catholic Radio network, and began airing Catholic radio programming.
