= WKCI-FM =

Contemporary hit radio station in Hamden–New Haven, Connecticut

- Hamden, Connecticut; United States
- Broadcast area: Greater New Haven; Greater Hartford; Greater Bridgeport
- Frequency: 101.3 MHz (HD Radio)
- RDS: PI: 6F4C; PTY: Top 40; RT: KC-101 - Artist - Title
- Branding: KC101

Programming
- Language: English
- Format: Contemporary hit radio
- Subchannels: HD2: 100.9 The Beat (Mainstream urban)
- Affiliations: Premiere Networks

Ownership
- Owner: iHeartMedia; (iHM Licenses, LLC)
- Sister stations: WAVZ; WELI

History
- First air date: February 10, 1969
- Former call signs: WDEE-FM (1965–1966 CP); WKCI (1966–1980); WKCI-FM (1980); WKCI (1980–2001)

Technical information
- Licensing authority: FCC
- Facility ID: 11930
- Class: B
- ERP: 12,000 watts
- HAAT: 279 meters (915 ft)
- Transmitter coordinates: 41.434°N 72.945°W
- Translator: HD2: 100.9 W265DB (Milbrook)

Links
- Public license information: Public file; LMS
- Webcast: Listen live (via iHeartRadio); HD2: Listen live (via iHeartRadio)
- Website: kc101.iheart.com; HD2: thebeatnewhaven.iheart.com

WKCI-FM (101.3 MHz, "KC101") is a commercial radio station licensed to serve Hamden, Connecticut. Owned by iHeartMedia, it airs a contemporary hit radio format.

The station's studios are located in Radio Towers Park on Benham Street in Hamden, where it shares facilities with sister stations WELI and WAVZ. WKCI-FM transmits a full Class B signal, broadcasting with 12,000 watts from a 915-foot (279 m) tower, the equivalent of 50,000 watts at 500 feet (150 m). The station's transmitter is located on Madmare Mountain in Hamden.

== HD Radio ==
WKCI-FM began broadcasts in HD Radio in December 2004. Its HD2 signal airs a mainstream urban format, providing a second option to WZMX, and is simulcast on FM translator W265DB at 100.9 MHz, known as "100.9 The Beat"; this format signed on the air at 12 a.m. on June 23, 2015.

Broadcast translator for WKCI-FM HD2
Call sign	Frequency	City of license	FID	ERP (W)	Class	Transmitter coordinates	FCC info
W265DB	100.9 FM	Milbrook, Connecticut	139897	250	D	41°20′58.8″N 72°58′20.7″W	LMS
