= List of films shot in Stamford, Connecticut =

Scene for College Road Trip being filmed in the Glenbrook section of Stamford

Stamford, Connecticut is increasingly being used as a filming location for motion pictures, especially since a 30 percent state tax credit for movie production took effect on July 1, 2006. The tax credit immediately started attracting filmmakers to Connecticut, creating a nascent industry connected to feature film production.

Two of the more significant movies shot in Stamford before the tax credit were The Cardinal, directed by Otto Preminger and Boomerang, directed by Elia Kazan.

This article lists feature films and documentaries shot entirely or in part in Stamford, in reverse chronological order of release.

== 2007-2023 ==
- Chang Can Dunk (2023) was filmed at Westhill High School in late 2021
- Boychoir (2014) - Filmed at Olde Stamford Town Hall
- It Begins (2012) are promo videos by WWE for Chris Jericho's third return on January 2, 2012 (note his nickname is Y2J). The filming took place at Cove Island Park, and Stamford High School
- We Need to Talk About Kevin (2011), starring John C. Reilly and Tilda Swinton, filming commenced on 19 April 2010 and concluded on 28 May 2010. Scenes were shot in Springdale and J.M. Wright Technical High School.
- Away We Go (2009), produced by Sam Mendes, starring John Krasinski and Maya Rudolph, written by Dave Eggers and Vendela Vida. The movie was filmed on May 23, 2008, at Remo's Brick Oven Pizza on Bedford Street (presented as a 24-hour French-Canadian diner in Montreal, with the "Remo's" name retained in the movie); a bar scene at the Medieval-looking Dragonfly Restaurant and Lounge on Summer Street is also represented as taking place in Montreal; scenes shot on May 12, 2008 at the Waterware Showrooms on Research Drive represent a bathtub and whirlpool showroom in Arizona; a blue raised ranch home on Vine Road, representing the home of the parents of the character played by Maya Rudolph.
- The Private Lives of Pippa Lee (2009).
- Everybody's Fine (2009)
- Confessions of a Shopaholic (2009), John Goodman, Joan Cusack and Isla Fisher were filmed in a scene at United House Wrecking on Hope Street in the Glenbrook section of town on April 7, 2008. The location is depicted as the "Nutley Stop & Swap" flea market in New Jersey. Sophie Kinsella, author of the book on which the movie is based, was also at the shooting. Playing vendors in the scene were a number of local antique dealers. Extras were recruited in January 2008 at a casting call at St. Basil College. Another scene for the film was shot in the Sheraton Hotel on Summer Street.
- Old Dogs (2009) - Filmed inside UConn Stamford Campus.
- Rachel Getting Married (2008) - In one scene, Anne Hathaway was shown entering the Post Grocers deli on Long Ridge Road. A scene was also filmed in the former Long Ridge Congregational Church.
- Pistol Whipped (2008), AKA Marker, with Steven Seagal, filmed scenes in the area of Columbus Park in the spring of 2007.
- College Road Trip (2008), with Martin Lawrence and Raven-Symoné, filmed at a home in Shippan, had plans to film in July 2007 at the E. Gaynor Brennan Municipal Golf Course on Stillwater Road. A scene was shot July 30, 2007 at the Lakeside Diner in Stamford.
- In Bloom (2008), currently in production. Starting in August 2006, the movie became the first major, full-length film since "The Ice Storm" to be shot entirely in Connecticut. Locations in Waterside, Springdale, Glenbrook and the West Side were being used as filming locations. "St. Basil College, Victory Deli, Pellicci's Restaurant, Stamford Hospital and private homes on Scott Place and Apple Tree Drive will be used to portray the fictitious town of Briarhill, Conn.," as well as the Palace Theater, according to The Advocate of Stamford.
- Righteous Kill (September 2008), starring Robert De Niro and Al Pacino, scene filmed at a model unit of the Trump Parc Stamford apartment building, representing a scene in New York City (with a New York City skyline added through special effects).
- Revolutionary Road (December 2008), directed by Sam Mendes
- The Sisterhood of the Traveling Pants 2 (2008)
- What Just Happened? (scheduled for release 2008) - filming in multiple locations in Stamford including Canal Street and Tresser Boulevard. One block in front of Stamford Mall was shut down on April 27 for a scene.
- Person of Interest (2007)
- Reservation Road (2007) started shooting in October 2006. Locations include Cove Island Park, Weed Avenue, Stamford Academy, Long Ridge Church, Black Bear Saloon, and Dolan Middle School Joaquin Phoenix, Jennifer Connelly, Mark Ruffalo and Mira Sorvino act in the film, Terry George directed. The movie is based on a 1999 novel by John Burnham Schwartz. The story involves two families — the father in one kills the son of the other in a hit and run accident.
- Saving Grace (2007)
- Ta Ra Rum Pum (2007)

== 1963-2006 ==
- The Cardinal (1963) - produced independently and directed by Otto Preminger, and distributed by Columbia Pictures. A church scene takes place in St. John the Evangelist Roman Catholic Church on Atlantic Street in Downtown Stamford. Some people stood for hours on the east side of Atlantic Street (across the street from the church) to get a glimpse of the stars.

The vaudeville scene with Robert (Bobby) Morse, was filmed at the newly renovated State Theatre in Springdale. The State was originally a vaudeville house complete with an orchestra pit and the original, massive stage curtain.

- The Curse of the Living Corpse (1964)
- The Horror of Party Beach (1964)
- The April Fools (1969) Filming at the Stamford Train Station and in Hycliff Terrace section.
- The Lords of Flastbush (1973) — the backyard of a home on Dale Street in the Cove section of Stamford was used as the location of the wedding reception
- Dracula Exotica (also known as Love at First Gulp, 1981)
- Return of Superfly (1989) — a city home was portrayed as an inner-city drug den; the six-story municipal building (no longer in existence) was used for a police station and law firm offices.
- Scenes from a Mall (1991) — shot almost entirely in the Stamford Town Center Mall, depicted as a Los Angeles shopping mall; for the June 1990 shooting, Christmas decorations were put up; Woody Allen and Bette Midler played a couple spending their wedding anniversary shopping.
- Beyond the Mat (1999)
- Wrong Number (2001)
- Moby Presents: Alien Sex Party (2002)
- The Ethereal Plane (2002)
- Chooch (2003)
- Three Long Years (2003)
- How I Learned to Stop Worrying and Love the Superlaser (2003)
- Rock & Roll Superhero (2003)
- Bottom Floor (2004)
- Dark Exposures (2004)
- Occupational Hazard (2004)
- Too Bad (2006)
- Wordplay (filmed at the Marriott hotel, 2006)
- Day Night Day Night (filmed in the Stamford train station, 2006)

== Boomerang ==
Boomerang (1947), directed by Elia Kazan was based on incidents in Bridgeport, Connecticut involving Stamford resident (and mayor and later U.S. Attorney General) Homer Cummings, for whom Cummings Park and the Lockwood, Cummings law firm are named. Cummings was Attorney General of the United States in Franklin Roosevelt's administration.

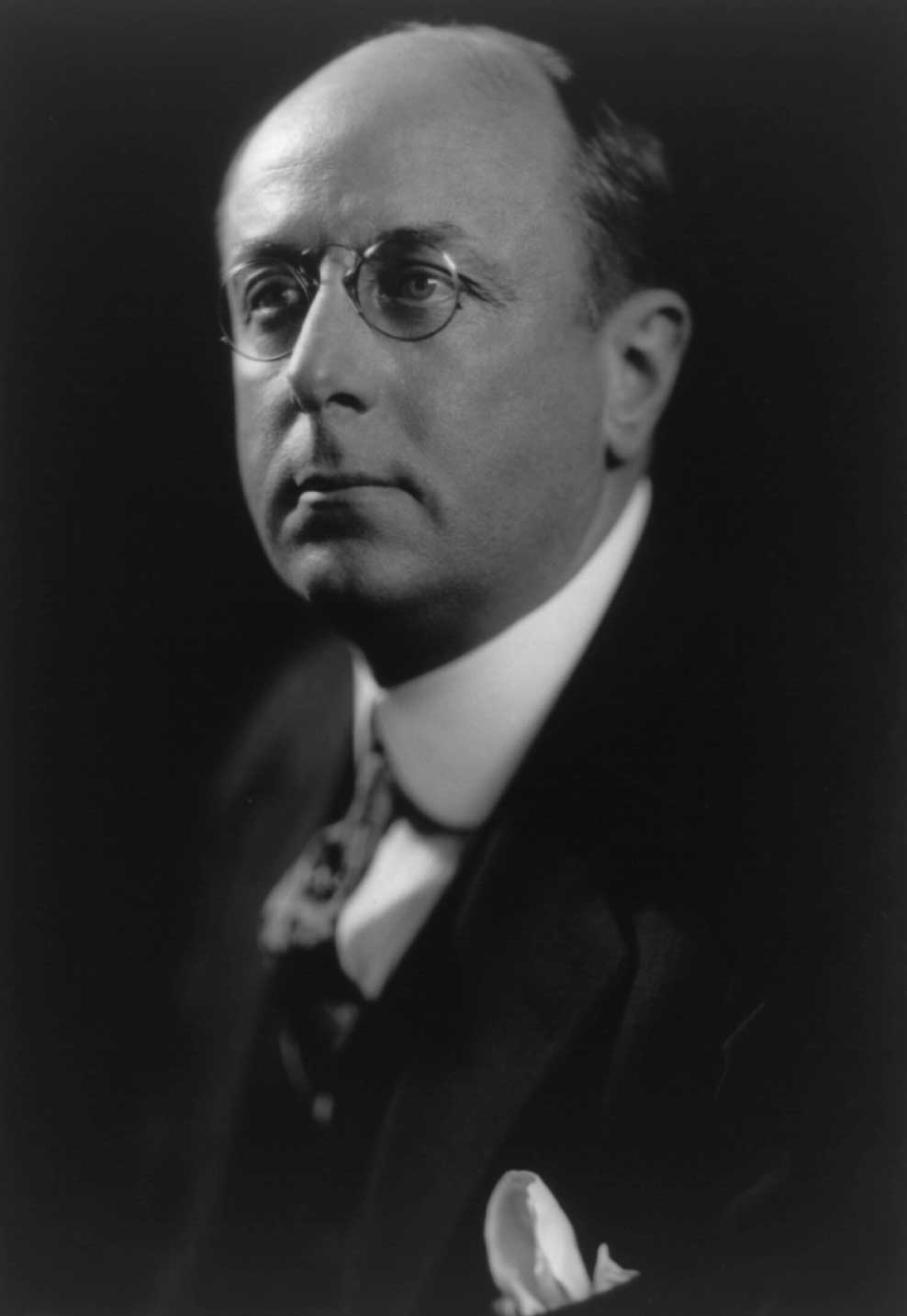
Homer Cummings

Almost all of the film was shot in Stamford except for the courtroom scene (shot in White Plains, New York).

"[I]t wasn't an oddity to run into Dana Andrews, one of the stars of the movie, in a local restaurant, or to see other stars on the street," according to Don Russell, a columnist for The Advocate.

Stamford locations:

- The South End of Stamford, particularly at Saint Luke's Chapel.
- Old Town Hall, particularly the Police Department offices and the stairway leading up from them to the courtroom.
- The Altschul home on Den Road in Stamford (for a meeting of leading citizens).
- For a scene in which a pastor was killed, the movie used the front and sidewalk of the Plaza Theatre, which stood on Greyrock Place (a driveway leading into the Stamford Town Center Mall is at that location now).
- The former offices of The Advocate of Stamford, the local daily newspaper, on Atlantic Street. Some members of the Advocate editorial staff members were used in a scene about the news breaking that the priest killer had been caught.

== Films before 1947 ==
- In the Season of Buds (1910)
- The Impalement (1910)
- How Molly Malone Made Good (also known as How Molly Made Good, 1915)
- The Sporting Duchess (1920)
- The Struggle (1931)
