= WICC (AM) =

Radio station in Bridgeport, Connecticut

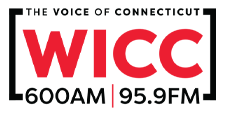
- Bridgeport, Connecticut; United States
- Broadcast area: Greater Bridgeport
- Frequency: 600 kHz
- Branding: WICC 600 AM and 95.9 FM

Programming
- Language: English
- Format: Talk radio
- Affiliations: ABC News Radio; Compass Media Networks; Westwood One; New York Yankees Radio Network

Ownership
- Owner: Connoisseur Media; (Connoisseur Media Licenses, LLC)
- Sister stations: WEBE; WEZN-FM; WICC-FM; WPLR; WYBC-FM

History
- First air date: November 8, 1926
- Call sign meaning: Industrial Capital of Connecticut

Technical information
- Licensing authority: FCC
- Facility ID: 72345
- Class: B
- Power: 1,000 watts (day); 500 watts (night)
- Transmitter coordinates: 41°9′36.35″N 73°9′51.4″W
- Translator: 107.3 W297CP (Bridgeport)
- Repeaters: 95.9 WICC-FM (Southport); 99.1 WPLR-HD2 (New Haven); 107.9 WEBE-HD2 (Westport)

Links
- Public license information: Public file; LMS
- Website: www.voiceofct.com

WICC (600 kHz) is a commercial radio station licensed to serve Bridgeport, Connecticut, owned by Connoisseur Media. It airs a news/talk radio format featuring local and nationally syndicated programs, as well as ABC News Radio.

The WICC (AM) studios are located on Wheelers Farms Road in Milford, and its transmitter is located on Pleasure Beach, a peninsula extending into Long Island Sound. Programming is also heard on WICC-FM (95.9} in Southport, FM translator W297CP (107.3 FM) in Bridgeport, and the second HD Radio subchannels of sister stations WEBE (107.9 FM), and WPLR (99.1 FM).

== Programming ==
WICC's lineup includes local talk shows with Melissa Sheketoff, and Lisa Wexler. Nationally syndicated programs include Markley, Van Camp and Robbins, Erick Erickson, Lars Larson and Red Eye Radio. Weekends feature shows on finance, gardening, and sports, along with When Radio Was and a radio version of Meet the Press. Most hours begin with world and national news from ABC News Radio. WICC was formerly a member of the New York Yankees Radio Network and formerly aired Sacred Heart University athletics.

== History ==
WICC is Bridgeport's first radio station and one of the first in Connecticut. It signed on the air on November 8, 1926. Its call letters stand for "Industrial Capital of Connecticut", which described Bridgeport throughout the early and mid-20th century.

In the early days, as radio assignments were being formalized, WICC broadcast from various places on the AM dial, including 1060 kHz, 1400 kHz, 1130 kHz, 1190 kHz and 1430 kHz until finally settling at 600 kHz in 1930.

Before March 1932, WICC affiliated with the Yankee Network. The station became an affiliate of the CBS Radio Network on September 25, 1932.

When network programming shifted from radio to television in the 1950s, WICC became a full service, middle of the road station, featuring popular music, news, talk and sports. Notably, Bob Crane was a host and disc jockey from late 1951 through 1956. In the 1970s and 1980s, the music moved closer to an Adult Top 40 sound.

In November 2001, WICC was acquired by Cumulus Media, which became one of the largest owners of radio stations in the U.S., as part of its $219.6 million acquisition of Aurora Communications. Over time, as music listening shifted from AM to FM radio, WICC added more talk programming, becoming an all-talk station in June 2002.

On April 15, 2019, Cumulus Media announced that WICC and co-owned 107.9 WEBE would be swapped to Connoisseur Media, which began operating the stations under a local marketing agreement (LMA) on May 1. The swap was consummated on June 26, 2019.

On September 3, 2024, Connoisseur began simulcasting WICC's programming on WFOX (95.9 FM), which had previously been broadcasting an active rock format. (Note: WFOX's call sign was changed to WICC-FM on February 1, 2026.) The simulcast was in part prompted by the end of the all-news format of WCBS in New York City; concurrently with the start of the simulcast, WICC began carrying CBS Radio Network newscasts, relaunched as "The Voice of Connecticut", and announced that Erick Erickson's syndicated program would be replaced by a local early afternoon show hosted by former WCBS anchor Brigitte Quinn effective September 30. Quinn's program, Newsline, lasted six weeks before being replaced by The Download, which is hosted by WICC reporters Jon Kamal (who also produces and hosts for WEZN-FM and WPLR) and Chris Williams.

== Translator ==
| Call sign | Frequency | City of license | FID | ERP (W) | Class | Transmitter coordinates | FCC info |
|---|---|---|---|---|---|---|---|
| W297CP | 107.3 FM | Bridgeport, Connecticut | 202762 | 250 | D | 41°9′39″N 73°9′53″W | LMS |
