= WSTC =

Simulcasts WSHU, Westport, Connecticut
- Stamford, Connecticut; United States
- Broadcast area: Stamford-Norwalk, Connecticut
- Frequency: 1400 kHz

Programming
- Format: Public radio; news/talk

Ownership
- Owner: Sacred Heart University
- Sister stations: WSHU; WSHU-FM; WSUF

History
- First air date: September 18, 1941
- Former call signs: WSRR (1941–1946)
- Call sign meaning: Stamford, Connecticut

Technical information
- Licensing authority: FCC
- Facility ID: 10660
- Class: C
- Power: 780 watts
- Transmitter coordinates: 41°2′49.3″N 73°31′34.4″W

Links
- Public license information: Public file; LMS
- Website: www.wshu.org

WSTC (1400 kHz) is a public AM radio station in Stamford, Connecticut. It serves the Stamford-Norwalk area with a non-commercial, listener-supported news/talk radio format, simulcast with co-owned WSHU (1260 AM) in Westport, Connecticut. WSTC is owned by Sacred Heart University.

Programming on WSTC and WSHU includes NPR shows Morning Edition, All Things Considered, Fresh Air with Terry Gross and 1A. A local staff supplies Connecticut news updates.

== History ==
The station signed on the air on September 18, 1941, as WSRR. It became WSTC in 1946; the following year, it added an FM station, WSTC-FM (now WARW). From the 1950s through the 1980s, WSTC was a full service, middle of the road station, featuring popular adult music with local news and sports.

WSTC and WNLK (1350 AM) in Norwalk were sold by Cox Radio, Inc. in 2011 and were initially operated by Sacred Heart via a local marketing agreement (LMA). Prior to then, WSTC and WNLK simulcast a commercial news/talk format.

On January 25, 2016, WSTC dropped its public radio simulcast with WSHU (1260 AM) and went silent. It returned to the air on June 1, 2016, with a format of adult standards with some talk shows. That format lasted only a little more than a year. On July 10, 2017, WSTC returned to a simulcast of WSHU.
