= WEZN-FM =

Radio station in Bridgeport, Connecticut

- Bridgeport, Connecticut; United States
- Broadcast area: Southern Connecticut
- Frequency: 99.9 MHz (HD Radio)
- Branding: Star 99.9

Programming
- Format: hot adult contemporary
- Subchannels: HD2: WWWF-FM simulcast (country music)
- Affiliations: Compass Media Networks

Ownership
- Owner: Connoisseur Media; (Connoisseur Media Licenses, LLC)
- Sister stations: WEBE; WICC; WICC-FM; WPLR; WYBC-FM

History
- First air date: October 21, 1960
- Former call signs: WJZZ (1960–1973); WEZN (1973–present)
- Call sign meaning: "Easy" (refers to previous easy listening format)

Technical information
- Licensing authority: FCC
- Facility ID: 48721
- Class: B
- ERP: 27,500 watts
- HAAT: 204 meters (669 ft)
- Transmitter coordinates: 41°16′44″N 73°11′8″W

Links
- Public license information: Public file; LMS
- Webcast: Listen live (via TuneIn)
- Website: www.star999.com/home

WEZN-FM (99.9 MHz, "Star 99.9") is a commercial radio station, licensed to serve Bridgeport, Connecticut. The station is owned by Connoisseur Media, and airs a hot adult contemporary radio format. The WEZN studios are located on Wheelers Farms Road in Milford, and its transmitter is located on Video Lane in Shelton.

== History ==
The station first signed on the air as WJZZ on October 21, 1960, the FM sister station of WICC. As the call letters imply, the station started out as a jazz outlet. There were few FM radios in the 1960s, and the all-jazz format was not financially viable. For a time, WICC simulcast the programming from AM 600 on FM 99.9. WICC sold the station after several years.

The station was later acquired by Williams Broadcasting, carrying a beautiful music format and changing its call sign to WEZN to reflect its easy listening sound. While WEZN was a popular and profitable station, the audience wanting to hear mostly orchestras and instrumental music was aging. In the 1990s, WEZN gradually added more soft adult contemporary vocals until it made the switch to full-time adult contemporary.

Despite the format changes, the station retains its WEZN call sign; however, outside of hourly station identifications, it rarely says those call letters on the air, preferring the moniker "Star 99.9".

The station was purchased from Cox Radio by Connoisseur Media along with sister stations WFOX and WPLR, at a purchase price of $40 million. Connoisseur Media took ownership on May 10, 2013.

== HD Radio ==
In July 2026, co-owned country music station WWWF-FM (103.1 The Wolf) on Long Island, New York began simulcasting on WEZN's HD2 subchannel, expanding the station's reach further on Long Island and into Connecticut.
