= Film industry in Connecticut =

Overview of the film industry in the U.S. state of Connecticut

The film industry in Connecticut, which previously consisted of small production companies making commercials, industrial films and some television programs, began growing dramatically as a state tax credit went into effect in 2006, attracting numerous filmmakers to shoot on location in the state.

The state's film tax-incentive program went into effect July 1, 2006 and immediately attracted film companies (many of them based in New York, New York) to shooting locations. Starting in August 2006, In Bloom (released in 2007 as The Life Before Her Eyes) became the first major, full-length film since The Ice Storm to be shot entirely in Connecticut.

The tax law allows producers who spend in excess of $50,000 in the state to receive up to 30 percent tax credits.

"Connecticut is absolutely a prime filming location now due to the tax incentive program which makes the state very appealing", according to Ellen Woolf, project manager with the Connecticut Commission on Culture & Tourism, Film Division. Before the tax break went into effect, the state saw between $3 million and $6 million a year in filmmaking revenue. In 2007, Woolf estimated, "we'll probably be hitting the $300 million mark".

According to a Variety article, the state is among the "top five" best state tax incentive programs in the country, although the evaluation was said to be "far from an exact science". The article described the state's film presence over the previous two years as having "gone from nonentity to major player in the incentive game, and has offered further proof that film-related legislation has the ability to give local economies an immediate boost." It said there were seven "high-profile" features shooting in the state as of early 2008, including Andrew Jarecki's All Good Things with Ryan Gosling and Kirsten Dunst, P. J. Hogan's "Confessions of a Shopaholic" and Sam Mendes' Farlanders.

== Film Division of the Connecticut Commission on Culture and Tourism ==
The Film Division was created to promote Connecticut as a filming location and help promote the state as a location for films, television shows, commercials, magazine and photo shoots by:

- Publishing an online "Production Guide Directory"
- Maintaining a photo gallery and database for filming locations
- Promoting the state's production companies, studios, service companies, and professionals
- Serving as a liaison between the industry and Connecticut municipalities to secure film permits

== Celebrity Residents ==
Connecticut is also the home of many famous actors. Celebrity residents of Connecticut have included Katharine Hepburn, Christopher Plummer, Jessica Tandy, Hume Cronyn, Christopher Walken, Robert Vaughn, Paul Newman, Joanne Woodward, Margaret Hamilton, Teresa Wright, Frances Dee, Helen Curry, Eileen Heckart, Melissa Joan Hart, Jill Goodacre, Jill Clayburgh, Ruth Chatterton, Imogene Coca, Rosemary Rice, Mia Farrow, Sandy Dennis, Jane Curtin, Brett Somers, Mary Tyler Moore, Jason Robards, George Lessey, Jack Paar, Art Carney, Frank Gifford, Max Showalter, Earl Hindman, Harvey Fierstein, Campbell Scott, John Ratzenberger, Giancarlo Esposito, Richard Widmark, Gilda Radner, Gene Wilder, Paul Simon, Harry Connick Jr., Diana Ross, Eartha Kitt, 50 Cent, Rip Torn, and Meryl Streep

== See also ==
- List of films shot in Stamford, Connecticut
