= WPLR =

Radio station in New Haven, Connecticut

- New Haven, Connecticut; United States
- Broadcast area: Greater New Haven; Hartford, Connecticut; North Shore (Long Island)
- Frequency: 99.1 MHz (HD Radio)
- Branding: 99.1 PLR

Programming
- Language: English
- Format: Mainstream rock
- Subchannels: HD2: Simulcast of WICC (news/talk)

Ownership
- Owner: Connoisseur Media; (Connoisseur Media Licenses, LLC)
- Sister stations: WEBE; WEZN-FM; WICC; WICC-FM; WYBC-FM

History
- First air date: 1948
- Former call signs: WNHC-FM (1948–1971)

Technical information
- Licensing authority: FCC
- Facility ID: 46968
- Class: B
- ERP: 15,000 watts
- HAAT: 276 meters (906 ft)
- Transmitter coordinates: 41°25′22.3″N 72°57′4.4″W

Links
- Public license information: Public file; LMS
- Webcast: Listen live
- Website: www.wplr.com

WPLR (99.1 MHz, also known as "99.1 PLR"), licensed to serve New Haven, Connecticut, is a mainstream rock station owned by Connoisseur Media as of May 10, 2013. The station's playlist includes rock music from the 1970s to the early 2000s.

The station, which first went on the air in 1948 as WNHC-FM, has a history as a pioneer in the album-oriented rock format, with which it has closely identified since its inception in the early 1970s.

The WPLR studios are located on Wheelers Farms Road in Milford, and its transmitter is located on Madmare Mountain in Hamden.

== WPLR-HD2 ==
On September 18, 2017, at 10:23 am. WPLR launched an alternative rock format on its HD2 subchannel, branded as "Mod 102.3" (reflecting its simulcast on translator W272DO 102.3 FM). The first song on Mod was "First" by Cold War Kids.

W272DO was sold to Red Wolf Broadcasting in January 2018. On January 15, it immediately ceased simulcasting "Mod" and began carrying Spanish CHR "Bomba" from WMRQ-FM HD2. As of November 24, 2019, WPLR-HD2 is no longer broadcasting the "Mod" format and is now simulcasting WICC (600 AM) from Bridgeport.
