= WSHU (AM) =

- Westport, Connecticut; United States
- Broadcast area: Fairfield County, Connecticut; North Shore (Long Island)
- Frequency: 1260 kHz
- Branding: WSHU Public Radio

Programming
- Language: English
- Format: Public radio (news and information)
- Affiliations: American Public Media; NPR; PRX

Ownership
- Owner: Sacred Heart University (pending sale to Omega Vision Network)
- Sister stations: WSHU-FM; WSTC; WSUF

History
- First air date: April 15, 1959
- Former call signs: WMMM (1959–1987); WCFS (1987–1989); WMMM (1989–2000)
- Call sign meaning: Sacred Heart University

Technical information
- Licensing authority: FCC
- Facility ID: 43126
- Class: D
- Power: 688 watts (day); 72 watts (night)
- Transmitter coordinates: 41°7′41.4″N 73°23′24.4″W
- Translator: (103.1 MHz) W276DY (Westport)
- Repeater: See § Repeaters

Links
- Public license information: Public file; LMS
- Webcast: Listen live (via TuneIn)
- Website: www.wshu.org

WSHU (1260 AM), is an NPR member radio station licensed to serve Westport, Connecticut, owned and operated by Sacred Heart University. By day, WSHU is powered at 688 watts, at night, to avoid interference with other stations on 1260 AM, it reduces power to 72 watts. Programming is also heard on 150-watt FM translator W276DY at 103.1 MHz in Westport.

WSHU primarily features news, talk and informational programming from National Public Radio with local news updates throughout the day. It holds periodic fundraisers on the air to support the running of the station. AM 1260 is one of the WSHU news and talk frequencies, which also includes the HD2 digital subchannel of WSHU-FM 91.1 in Fairfield, WSTC (1400 AM) in Stamford, and WSUF (89.9 FM) in Greenport, New York.

== History ==
The station signed on the air on April 15, 1959. For its first three decades, the station's call sign was WMMM (standing for Westport's Modern Minute Man). It was a daytimer, broadcasting at 1,000 watts by day and required to go off the air at night. Throughout most of its history, WMMM had a full service middle of the road radio format, featuring popular adult music, local news and sports. For many years, it was co-owned with an FM station on 107.9 MHz (now WEBE).

On June 18, 2015, WSHU was granted a Federal Communications Commission (FCC) construction permit to change the community of license to Seymour, move to a different transmitter site, decrease day power to 650 watts and increase night power to 17 watts. The station did not go through with the new construction and the construction permit is no longer listed on the FCC's website.

== Repeaters ==
Call sign	Frequency	Band	City of license	State	Facility ID
WSHU-HD2	91.1 (HD2)	FM	Fairfield	Connecticut	58515
WSTC	1400	AM	Stamford	Connecticut	10660
W276DY (Note: Translator; rebroadcasts WSHU)	103.1	FM	Westport	Connecticut	200235
WSUF	89.9	FM	Greenport	New York	58516
