= Greater Bridgeport =

Southwestern Connecticut
- Metropolitan statistical area
- Bridgeport–Stamford–Danbury Metropolitan Statistical Area
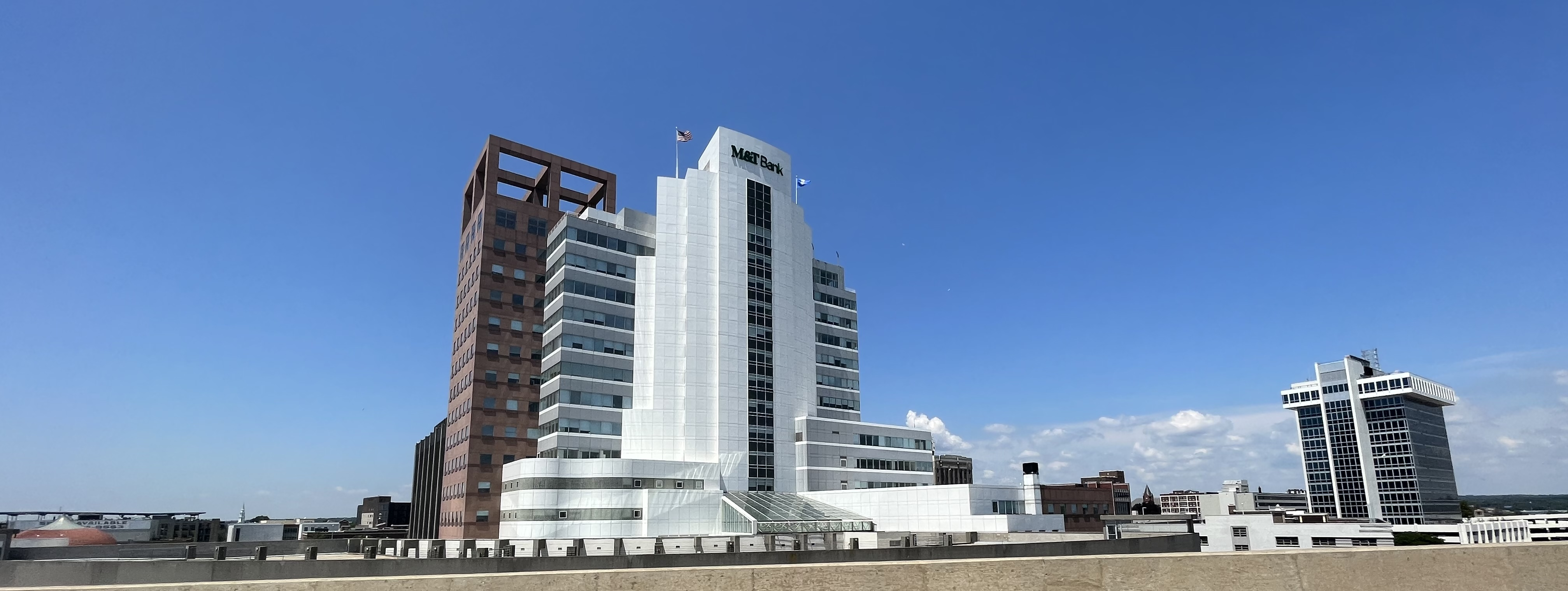
- Downtown Bridgeport, the region's largest city, seen from I-95
Map of Greater Bridgeport MSA
Greater Bridgeport, CT MSA
Other Components of the New York City CSA
- Country: United States
- State(s): Connecticut
- Largest city: Bridgeport
- Other cities: Stamford; Norwalk; Danbury

Area
  - Total: 625.8 sq mi (1,621 km^{2})

Population (2015)
  - Total: 948,053
  - Rank: 57th in the U.S.
  - Density: 1,515/sq mi (584.9/km^{2})

GDP
  - MSA: $104.368 billion (2022)

Bridgeport–Stamford–Danbury is a metropolitan area in the U.S. state of Connecticut. The area is located in Southwestern Connecticut. In its most conservative form, the area consists of the Metropolitan Connecticut region, including the City of Bridgeport and five surrounding towns—Easton, Fairfield, Monroe, Stratford, and Trumbull. This area has a population of more than 305,000.

The United States Census Bureau defines Greater Bridgeport as the Bridgeport-Stamford-Danbury metropolitan statistical area. This metropolitan statistical area includes all of Fairfield County, Connecticut. In 2015, the area had an estimated population of 948,053, and the area is included in the New York-Newark Combined Statistical Area.

The combined metropolitan area is the fourth largest in New England, behind Boston, Providence, and Hartford's. This area includes Connecticut's two largest cities, Bridgeport and Stamford. As of 2022 the Bridgeport-Stamford-Norwalk-Danbury area has been split into two different Connecticut regions (the state equivalent to counties), the Western Connecticut region (including Stamford, Norwalk and Danbury), and Metropolitan Connecticut (MetroCOG), consisting of the five towns of Greater Bridgeport. The region is home to one of the largest concentration of corporate headquarters in the nation.

== Definitions ==
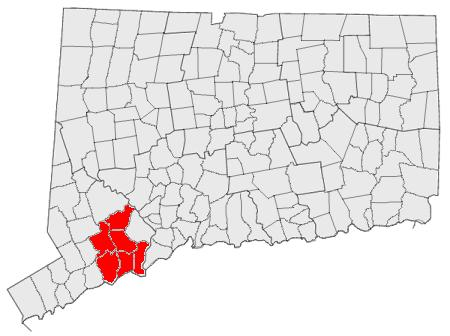
Towns of the Greater Bridgeport region

=== Greater Bridgeport Region ===
The smallest official definition of Greater Bridgeport is the area under the authority of the Greater Bridgeport Regional Planning Agency, which oversees transportation, land use and economic development planning for its member towns. The region consists of the six towns indicated in the introduction.

=== Bridgeport labor market area ===
The Bridgeport Labor Market Area includes the core region above and also extends northeast into Milford and the Lower Naugatuck Valley (including Ansonia, Beacon Falls, Derby, Oxford, Seymour, and Shelton) for a total of 13 towns.

=== Bridgeport-Stamford NECTA ===
The urbanized areas of Stamford and Bridgeport are contiguous and considered by the U.S. Census Bureau as a single urban core. The towns containing this merged urbanized area, plus surrounding towns with significant commuter interchange to the central towns, are grouped together as the Bridgeport-Stamford-Norwalk New England City and Town Area. The area contains 25 towns and includes the Greater Bridgeport Region, the Gold Coast, the Lower Naugatuck Valley, and the additional outlying towns of Milford, Newtown, Redding, Ridgefield, Southbury, and Woodbridge. As of the 2000 census, the population of the NECTA was 892,283

A slightly smaller definition known as the Southwest Service Delivery Area consists of the Greater Bridgeport Region, the Lower Naugatuck Valley (including Oxford), the Gold Coast, and the town of Milford (20 towns).

=== Metropolitan Statistical Area ===
The U.S. Office of Management and Budget defines the Bridgeport–Stamford–Danbury, CT Metropolitan Statistical Area (MSA) based on Connecticut planning regions. As of July 2023, the MSA consists of the Greater Bridgeport and Western Connecticut Planning Regions. The 2025 population estimate for the MSA is 978,179.

Planning region	2025 estimate	2020 census	Change	Area	Density
Western Connecticut	640,482	620,549	+3.21%	532.1 sq mi (1,378 km^{2})	1,204/sq mi (465/km^{2})
Greater Bridgeport	337,697	325,778	+3.66%	140.2 sq mi (363 km^{2})	2,409/sq mi (930/km^{2})
Total	978,179	946,327	+3.37%	672.3 sq mi (1,741 km^{2})	1,455/sq mi (562/km^{2})

== Economy ==
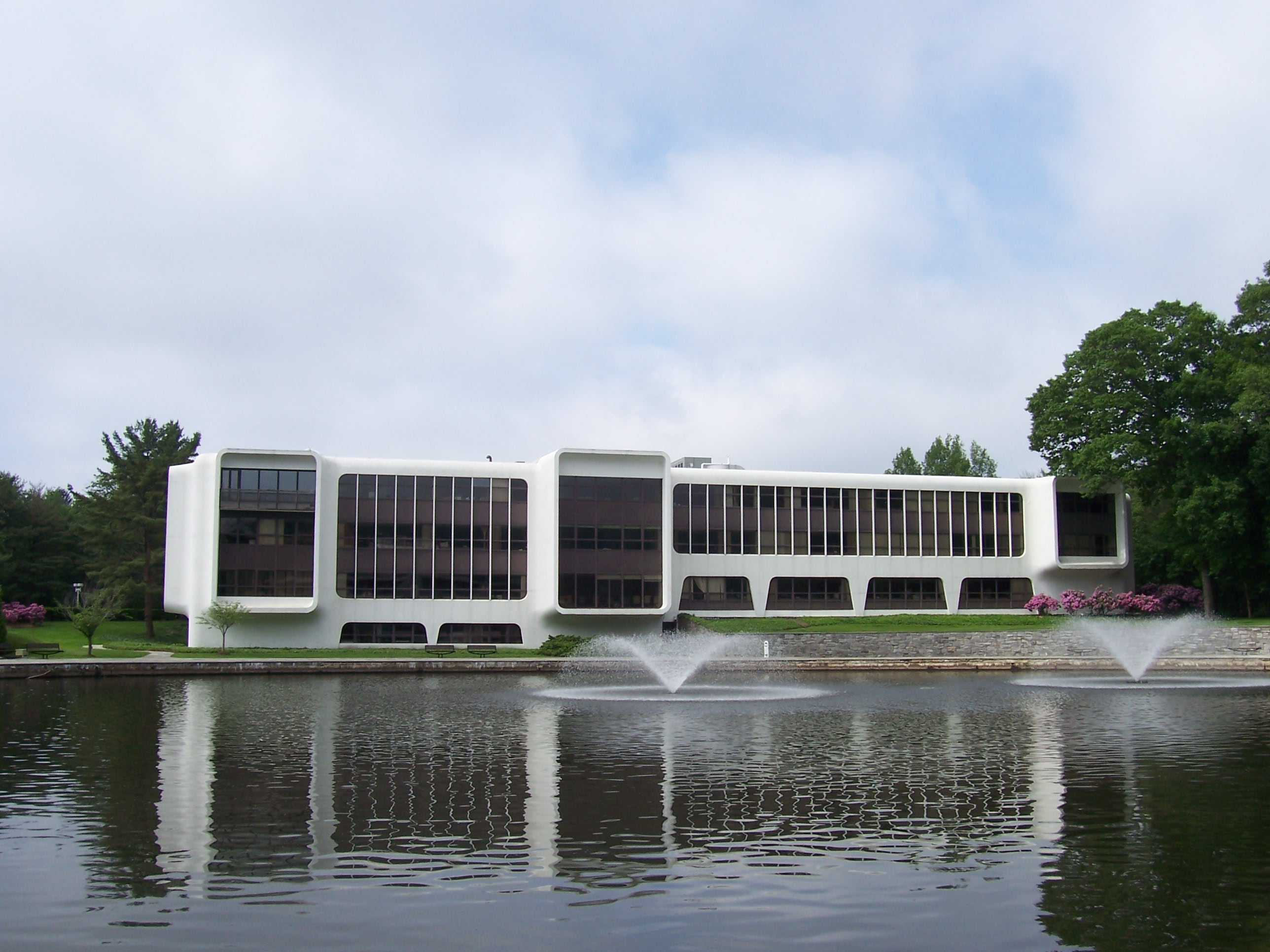
Frontier Communications' new headquarters in Stamford

The Greater Bridgeport area is home to multiple Fortune 500 companies, including Emcor, Xerox, and Booking Holdings in Norwalk, Charter Communications, Synchrony Financial, United Rentals, and Frontier Communications in Stamford, XPO, Inc. in Greenwich, and the New England regional base of M&T Bank (a company based in Buffalo, New York) in Bridgeport. The coastline portion of the metropolitan area, which is Fairfield County, is known as the Gold Coast, is the densest concentration of wealth in the US, being home to hedge funds, some of the wealthiest towns in the country, commuter Wall Street executives and wealthy WASP families.

The Greater Bridgeport area, particularly Stamford, is home to WWE, NBC Sports Group, along with their studios, CBS Sports HQ, A&E Networks also has a presence there, all due to Connecticut tax incentives. Blue Sky Studios was based in Greenwich until being closed by Disney in 2022. Maury, Jerry Springer and The Steve Wilkos Show are also shot in downtown Stamford.

Many towns in the area were once home to heavy industry, and Bridgeport was the state's chief manufacturing city by output and value of goods. Despite a corporate exodus due to deindustrialization, (including the General Electric factory and the Columbia Pictures Processing Plant) nearby Stratford continues to be home to Sikorsky Aircraft and Shelton home to Hubbell Incorporated.

Other major well known companies in the area not listed previously include:

- GXO Logistics (Greenwich)
- GE Energy Financial Services (Stamford)
- Pitney Bowes (Stamford)
- Indeed.com (Stamford)
- ITT Inc. (Stamford)
- Conair Corporation (Stamford)
- BlueTriton Brands (formerly Nestlé Waters North America)
- Gartner (Stamford)
- Kayak (Stamford)
- Point72 Asset Management (Stamford)
- Vineyard Vines (Stamford)
- Bigelow Tea Company (Fairfield)
- Vinegar Syndrome (Bridgeport)
- Subway (Shelton)
- Sikorsky Aircraft (Stratford)
- CTI Electronics Corporation (Stratford)
- Ethan Allen Furniture (Danbury)
- Photronics (Brookfield)

== Transportation ==
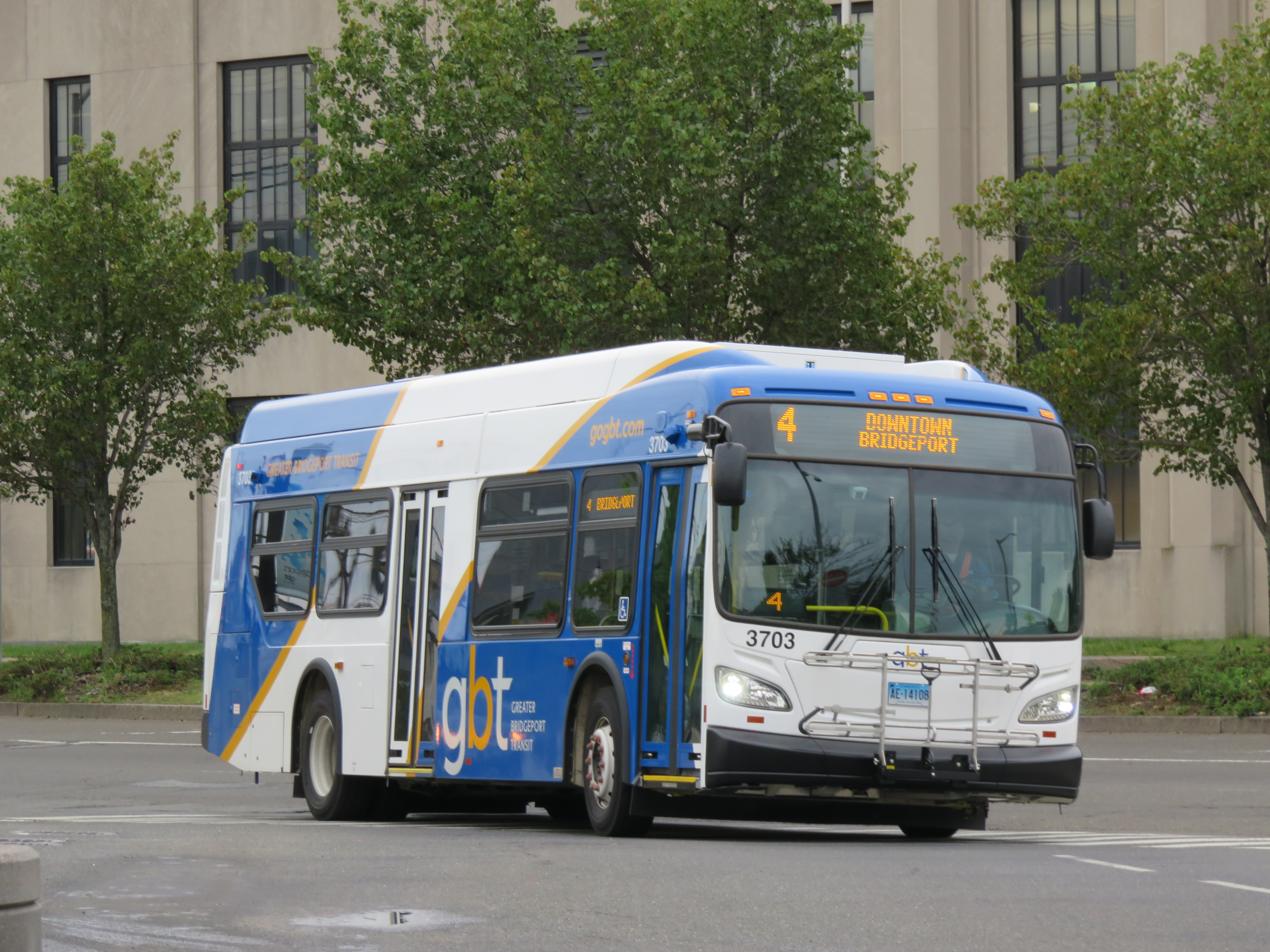
Greater Bridgeport Transit Bus in Downtown Bridgeport

Commuter rail is served by the Metro-North railroad of the MTA, which connects the Connecticut suburbs to New York City, with the New Haven line passing through every station along the coast. The New Canaan Line and the Waterbury Line connect northern Fairfield County and the Naugatuck Valley to New York City. The Bridgeport and Stamford stations are also served by Shore Line East and Amtrak rail service.

The metropolitan area is served by multiple bus operators for public transit. The Greater Bridgeport Transit Authority operates from downtown near the train station and serves Bridgeport and the surrounding towns of Trumbull, Stratford, Milford, Westport, Fairfield, Shelton, and Monroe, which works in conjunction with the Norwalk and Milford Transit. GBT Coastal Link buses connect in Norwalk to the Norwalk Transit District, which takes riders as far north as Danbury and west as Greenwich. CT Transit operates a division in Stamford, which includes Greenwich, Darian, New Canaan, and Port Chester, NY.

The region is served mainly by Bradley and New York City airports, with the regional airports nearby including Westchester County Airport (in White Plains, New York) and Tweed New Haven Airport (in New Haven). Talks about commercial services returning to Sikorsky Memorial Airport have been going on for years. Built in the 1920s on Avon Field, located in Stratford and previously owned by the City of Bridgeport (until bought by the Connecticut Airport Authority), the airport ceased commercial flights in 1999, along with the demolition of the passenger terminal.

== Higher education ==
=== Universities and full-time colleges ===
- Western Connecticut State University in Danbury, founded 1903
- University of Bridgeport in Bridgeport, founded 1927
- Fairfield University in Fairfield, founded 1942
- Sacred Heart University in Fairfield, founded 1963
- The University of Connecticut in Storrs has a secondary campus in Stamford, as does Sacred Heart University.

=== Community colleges ===
- Housatonic Community College in Bridgeport
- Norwalk Community College in Norwalk

== See also ==
- Gold Coast (Connecticut) for the contiguous urbanized area that goes along the whole coast of Fairfield County
- Lower Naugatuck River Valley which is part of the Bridgeport Labor Market Area
