= WSHU-FM =

Public radio station in Fairfield, Connecticut, United States

- Fairfield, Connecticut; United States
- Broadcast area: Connecticut: Fairfield County; New Haven County; Middlesex County; New York: Putnam County; Suffolk County
- Frequency: 91.1 MHz (HD Radio)
- Branding: WSHU Public Radio

Programming
- Language: English
- Format: News/talk; classical music
- Subchannels: HD2: Simulcast of WSHU; HD3: Simulcast of WJMJ (Christian radio)
- Affiliations: NPR

Ownership
- Owner: Sacred Heart University
- Sister stations: WSHU; WSTC; WSUF

History
- First air date: January 11, 1965
- Call sign meaning: Sacred Heart University

Technical information
- Licensing authority: FCC
- Facility ID: 58515
- Class: B
- ERP: 20,000 watts
- HAAT: 194.6 meters (638 ft)
- Transmitter coordinates: 41°16′44.3″N 73°11′6.4″W
- Translator: See § Translators

Links
- Public license information: Public file; LMS
- Webcast: Listen live (via TuneIn)
- Website: www.wshu.org

WSHU-FM (91.1 FM) is an NPR member radio station operated by Sacred Heart University. Licensed to serve Fairfield, Connecticut, it covers the Connecticut and Long Island area with news and classical music programming. Programs produced at WSHU and distributed nationally include Sunday Baroque.

== Translators ==
Broadcast translators for WSHU-FM
Call sign	Frequency	City of license	FID	HAAT	Transmitter coordinates	FCC info
W241CA	96.1 FM	Danbury, Connecticut	143515	0 m (0 ft)	41°23′45.2″N 73°25′26.1″W	LMS
W293AU (Note: Relays WSHU-FM-HD2)	106.5 FM	Derby, Connecticut	143438	0 m (0 ft)	41°23′29.5″N 73°3′12″W	LMS
W211AI	90.1 FM	Stamford, Connecticut	58518	29 m (95 ft)	41°2′49″N 73°31′34″W	LMS
W217AF	91.3 FM	Huntington Station, New York	58505	121 m (397 ft)	40°46′56.3″N 73°22′3.4″W	LMS
W293BT	106.5 FM	Ridge, New York	58509	121 m (397 ft)	40°51′18.4″N 72°46′10.4″W	LMS

== See also ==
- WSHU (AM) — 1260 AM, licensed to Westport, Connecticut
- WSUF — 89.9 FM, licensed to Noyack, New York
