= 2011 in radio =

The following is a list of events affecting radio broadcasting in 2011. Events listed include radio program debuts, finales, cancellations, and station launches, closures and format changes, as well as information about controversies.

== Events ==
=== January ===
Date	Event
1	Radio and Television of Slovakia, a new state-funded organisation based in Bratislava, is formed by a merger of Slovenská televízia (Slovak Television) and Slovenský rozhlas (Slovak Radio).
2	KELI/San Angelo flip from Adult Hits to AC as Magic 98.7. Urban AC WPHR-FM/Syracuse became News/Talk WSYR-FM.
3	More post-New Year's Day format flips occurred, with Spanish Christian KSAC-FM/Sacramento changing to a Business Talk format, likewise with Talk sister station KVCE/Dallas-Ft. Worth, Adult Top 40 WBZZ/Albany changing to 90s hits as "Crush 105.7," WMVX/Cleveland dropping Adult Top 40 in favor of Adult Hits as "106.5 The Lake", KCKC/Kansas City shedding Adult Contemporary for Classic Alternative as "Alice 102.1", KFYX/Texarkana flipping from CHR to Talk as Freedom 107, and Spanish Christian moving from WNSW/Newark to WNYH/Huntington as WNSW flipped to Russian.
4	Toyota unveiled the Entune, a multimedia in-car communications and entertainment system that would be available on selected 2011 models. The device featured Bing searching, Pandora, HD Radio, XM, and iHeartRadio, a CD player, and Bluetooth and USB connectivity.
5	Inspired by a story that appeared in The Columbus Dispatch, Top 40 WNCI morning hosts Dave Kaelin and Jimmy Jam helped Ted Williams, a homeless man with a troubled past, seek job offers and attract attention from the national media.
6	President Barack Obama signed into law The Local Community Radio Act, which paved the way for Low-power FM stations to start operations without unnecessary restrictions.
6	Seven African-American account executives filed a joint discrimination complaint with the Equal Employment Opportunity Commission against Clear Channel/New Orleans, claiming that station management were giving them less pay and fewer sales leads while their White counterparts got more pay, better leads and better advertisers.
6	Classic Hits WQTX/Lansing flipped to Country as "92.1 Big Country".
7	United States Congressman Doug Lamborn (R-Colorado 5th) introduced a bill that would eliminate all funding for NPR. The news came a day after NPR SVP Ellen Weiss resigned in the wake of her decision to fire commentator Juan Williams in October 2010.
10	Australian Radio Network added On Air with Ryan Seacrest to its evening lineup, where it would be heard on Adult Top 40 outlets Mix 106.5/Sydney and Mix 101.1/Melbourne. TV/radio personality and singer Michelle Visage was named the new morning co-host at Rhythmic Hot AC WMIA/Miami.
10	CBS Radio reacquires the WBZZ calls from WQSH, planning to use them to replace the WZPT calls in Pittsburgh, where the WBZZ calls were once heard and retain the Adult Top 40 direction once the calls return to Pittsburgh, following the merging of the current format with WBZW's Top 40 format in 2010. However, the WZPT calls could end up on another Pittsburgh station.
11	Clear Channel sold KUFX/San Jose to Entercom
13	In the wake of the 2011 Tucson shooting, a series of outdoor ads from News/Talk KNST promoting Rush Limbaugh with the banner "Straight Shooter" riddled with bullets was removed by co-owned Clear Channel Outdoor. Ironically, one of the ads had been located near the aforementioned crime scene.
14	CKRK/Edmonton protested a ruling from the Canadian Broadcast Standards Council by playing an unedited version of Dire Straits' 1985 song "Money for Nothing" every hour for a month after the CBSC ruled the song as too offensive for Canadian broadcasts. WWTJ flipped to a simulcast of WCHV.
17	Sirius XM Radio received Federal Communications Commission (FCC) approval to place 1,800 watt repeaters in Alaska and Hawaii, paving the way for the satellite service to now cover all 50 states. The expansion in Alaska had been long opposed by Alaskan broadcasters, who feared that satellite radio would hurt their stations; the situation was similar in Hawaii.
18	WKJI/Long Island would flip to Country as My Country 96.1, and Talk KBYO/Monroe would flip to an undetermined format as Fun Radio 92.7. A duopoly was formed in Pittsburgh, with the owners of WYEP buying Duquesne University's WDUQ. The University of San Francisco moved the Alternative format of KUSF/San Francisco to online and replaced it with programming from Classical Public Radio Network. It was announced that Entercom had sold the format and intellectual property of KDFC to CPRN parent University of Southern California and would make KDFC's 102.1 signal the new home of KUFX with KUFX's 98.5 signal a simulcast.
19	Bonneville International sold 17 stations to Hubbard Broadcasting. The deal meant that Bonneville would exit the Chicago, Cincinnati, St. Louis and Washington, D.C., radio markets.
21	Active Rock WLUP/Chicago evolves to Classic Rock.
22	Clear Channel/Memphis GSM Jeffery Jones is arrested on extortion charges.
24	WQJQ/Jackson, Mississippi, drops Urban Oldies for Classic Hits and takes the call letters of its AM sister, WJDX.
26	KZMG/Boise drops Top 40/CHR for a simulcast of Sports Talk KTIK.
27	Spirit Radio, an Irish Christian and religious radio station, begins broadcasting on 89.8–92.2 MHz, covering the cities of Dublin, Cork, Limerick, Galway, Waterford, Bray, Greystones, Dundalk, Naas Athlone, Carlow, Kilkenny and Newbridge. The station originally broadcasts from Hume House, Ballsbridge, using a studio formerly belonging to FM104.
28	The CRTC revokes the license of Ryerson University's campus radio station, CKLN-FM. The station would be granted a court injunction on February 11, allowing it to remain on the air pending the results of an appeal to the Federal Court of Canada.

=== February ===
Date	Event
1	Rick Dees signs a deal with Westwood One to distribute his programs produced by his company Dees Entertainment, including his long-running countdown show The Rick Dees Weekly Top 40. In addition, 25 Cumulus Media outlets would pick up most of Dees' shows to air on their stations.
1	KYLZ/Salt Lake City drops Triple-A to simulcast Sport Talk sister station KZNS. and KGU/Honolulu drops Religious programming for Business Talk, joining sister stations KSAC and KVCE.
2	WPTR/Albany drops Christian Contemporary to become "Legends 96.7." Top 40/CHR KDLW/Albuquerque replaced regional Mexican sister station KLVO at the latter's 106.7 signal. KDLW's 97.7 signal would pick up a new format after it finished its temporary simulcasts.
3	KOPA Pala, CA signs on as Pala Rez Radio 91.3. Top 40/CHR WDOD/Chattanooga changed its moniker from "The Mountain" to "Hits 96."
4	Four new Top 40s make their début. San Antonio, Texas, picks up its fourth as KLTO drops Active Rock to become "Party 97.7." KHHM/Sacramento evolves from its longtime Rhythmic format to a Mainstream direction with a Rhythmic lean. KVLY/McAllen officially shifts to Mainstream after a long tenure as an Adult Top 40. Edmonton adds a third as CFMG also shifts from Adult Top 40 to the "Virgin Radio" brand. Meantime, KQMQ/Honolulu drops the format and stunts with Bob Marley music until February 7, when it flips to Traditional Hawaiian Music as "Na Mele 93.1," only to later reveal its true format, Reggae. Meanwhile, the "Virgin Radio" brand that was used at Rock CKQB/Ottawa was dropped and reverted to its former branding "106.9 The Bear."
11	Expat Party, a syndicated radio programme featuring party songs, is launched by Fourway Media, broadcasting to Spain, the Canary Islands, Greece, Malta and Gibraltar.
14	Suburban Los Angeles Adult Hits KJLL-FM rebranded from "92.7 Jill FM" to "Playlist 92.7."
15	Reports leaked that Apple would include both terrestrial and satellite radio capabilities in the upcoming iPhone 5, which was due to debut later in the year.
18	After two weeks of simulcasting KDLW, KLVO is relaunched as Christian Contemporary "Shine 97.7."
20	The Voice of Free Libya (Sawt Libya al-Hurra) begins broadcasting, following the outbreak of violent revolution in Libya. The name was used by three radio stations aligned to the anti-Gaddafi forces that began broadcasting during this period, operating from the cities of Benghazi, Bayda and Misrata.
23	France Bleu Toulouse, a public radio station in the Toulouse area of France, begins broadcasting on 90.5 MHz.
23	KCEZ, Chico, California, drops Oldies for Rhythmic Top 40, branded as "Power 102". The station was patterned after its sister Rhythmic outlet KEWB/Redding.
23	Citadel Media announces that it will shorten the length of its syndicated American Country Countdown to three hours and go to a thirty-song chart presentation.
24	Another station in Chico, California, flips formats, as KEWE dropped sports for Adult Top 40 as KCKS, "101.7 Kiss-FM"
28	WCTC lets go of the Classic Hits format in favor of the talk format.
28	Washington, D.C.'s WJFK is confirmed as the flagship for the Washington Nationals baseball team.
28	Jarad Broadcasting's WLIR-FM is sold to Livingstone Broadcasting of Hampton Bays for $650,000 in cash.
28	The FCC discovers a pirate station at a Wilshire Boulevard office building in Los Angeles, operating on the 101.5 frequency. The owner of the building is sent notice of unlicensed operation.
28	COFETEL, Mexico's FCC counterpart, announces that IBOC HD Radio technology would be adopted for that country.

=== March ===
Date	Event
1	WXKS/Boston switches its branding from "Rush Radio 1200" to "Talk 1200".
1	WIBX/Utica, New York, cuts its CBS Radio Network affiliation in favor of Fox News Radio. The station had been affiliated with CBS since 1934.
2	Modern Rock KXOR-FM/ Thibodaux flips to Classic Rock as Rock Hits Radio LA106.3.
4	KRVR/Modesto retires its Soft/Urban AC format in favor of Classic Hits.
9	NPR's President Vivian Schiller and fund-raising executive Ron Schiller (no relation) resign after controversial comments made by Ron Schiller about the Tea Party and Conservatives are caught on hidden camera by a group posing as a Muslim organization.
9	WSOS-FM trades in the soft adult contemporary format for classic rock.
9	The University of Minnesota Golden Gophers and CBS Radio's WCCO part ways as the university signed a three-year contract with Clear Channel's KFAN/KTLK-FM. The university's football games would subsequently be broadcast on KFAN/KTLK.
9	A man's body is found on the tip of CBS television station WWJ's tower. Police reported that the man seemed to have climbed up the tower and taken his own life.
9	The FCC fines a Ft. Lauderdale businessman $40,000 for unlawfully operating a radio station and repeatedly ignoring their warnings.
9	It is announced that Iowa governor Terry Branstad will host a call-in radio show on WHO once a month.
10	Cumulus Media announce that they have acquired Citadel Broadcasting for US$2.4 billion. The deal, pending FCC approval, would give Cumulus 572 stations in more than 120 radio markets.
10	KZWF/Des Moines' country format ends, as the station turns to the Rhythmic Top 40 format under the branding Hits 105.9. The move brought the Rhythmic format back to Des Moines after KDRB had dropped it in April 2005.
11	WPEN-FM/Philadelphia on-air personality Mike Missanelli is heard on live air saying two obscenities during a commercial break. Missanelli quickly apologized for his language.
11	Canadian station CHAY-FM drops the Hot AC for adult contemporary.
13	KVIL in Dallas, Texas, lets go of the Delilah syndicated radio show in favour of Donny Osmond's syndicated program.
14	Chicago's "Jack" station WJMK rebranded as K-Hits.
14	Carrabelle, Florida's WOCY trades the country format for CHR.
14	Washington, D.C.'s WILC turns away from Spanish contemporary, moving to Spanish adult contemporary.
15	KUFO/Portland's 21-year run as an Active Rock outlet ends abruptly as it flips to a simulcast of News/Talk sister station KXL.
15	It is announced that former Illinois governor Rod Blagojevich and his wife will host Chicago AM station WLS for a day as fill-ins.
16	Politician Michael Powell, who served as FCC chairman, will head the National Cable & Telecommunications Association. Current chairman Kyle McSlarrow will step down in April.
16	KLCK-FM shed its former KWJZ call letters, changing to KLCK to fit their "Click" branding.
16	Talk on-air personality Glenn Beck suggests that the Japanese earthquake is a message from God. Television talk show The View slams him for his comments.
16	Dave Bestler is named the new CFO of Hubbard Radio.
17	Los Angeles talk station KFI radio host Bill Handel undergoes open heart surgery to have his aortic valve replaced. The following day, Handel reported that the surgery was "textbook perfect" and went faster than predicted.
18	At 5 pm ET, a smell of burning is reported in the basement of Philadelphia's WIP studios, and the building is immediately evacuated. It turns out to be a false alarm.
18	Debut Broadcasting add three new syndicated programs to their portfolio. The shows included A Country Legend, which will interview country musicians; a NASCAR program called Radio Racing Minute, hosted by NASCAR commentator Todd Lewis, and a country music show, Boot Scooting '90s, focused on '90s country songs.
18	Tucson's ESPN AM station KFFN starts airing on 104.9 FM using a translator. The station would broadcast in the northern side of Tucson.
18	FBI agents charge a man from Maine for making threats against two NPR radio personalities. According to the report, John Crosby threatened in an email that NPR host Melissa Block would be raped, tortured, and killed. Crosby then emailed radio host Guy Raz saying that Raz would be hanged.
18	WFJO in Folkston, Georgia, flips from Classic Hits to Gospel music.
21	Another Chico, California outlet, KQPT, shifts from Modern AC to Top 40/CHR, bringing the number of Top 40s in this market to three, all having launched this year.
21	WLOW slightly changes from soft adult contemporary to Hot AC.
22	Greensboro's WBRF changes back to classic country from contemporary country after displeased listeners started calling the station about the new format.
22	Sheboygan, Wisconsin's AM sports station WCLB drops ESPN sports programming, replacing them with Fox Sports. The station also chose "The Game" as their new branding.
22	Howard Stern and his radio production company announces they are filing a lawsuit towards Sirius XM for unpaid stock shares. Stern also recently extended his Sirius XM contract until 2015.
22	London, Ohio, low-power station WCYC announces that thieves have taken their equipment, including everything from microphones to monitors; some of the equipment is recovered. The station will no longer broadcast until everything is retrieved.
22	A mentally ill man with a gun entered Canadian station CKKQ, threatening staff members. The gun turned out to be a toy. The man was not charged and explained that he did it attempting to win another local station's contest.
22	KGEX/Kansas City becomes the latest casualty of the "Gen X" format, as it flips to "Bright AC" as "99.7 The Point."
23	Eau Claire, Wisconsin's country station WAXX stops broadcasting after their 2,000-foot tower falls during a severe storm. The station also served television station WEAU-TV. The station announces that they will now be heard on sister station WECL or online.
23	It is announced that Clear Channel has tried to buy Playlist.com, which had filed for bankruptcy protection the previous August.
23	Apple Inc. announce that their music storage device Cloud will be available in April. The device will allow users to access their saved music from any mobile device.
23	London, Ohio station WCYC state that all their stolen equipment has been recovered and they are back on the air. Police said the station gear had been found in a London apartment.
23	A press release from Fisher Communications says that they are looking to increase their Fisher Plaza building's value and sell it.
23	Slacker Radio announced a deal with ESPN Radio to feature ESPN programming on Slacker channels.
23	KVFX drops classic rock for Top 40/CHR, adopting "Hot 101.7" as the station's new branding.
24	AM talk station KMBZ announces that it will simulcast on KUDL, ending that station's AC format.
24	Talk host Don Imus announced that he had signed ten AM and FM affiliates to his lineup. They include WGVA, WPKZ, WAUB, WSNO, WJMX, KQEW, WJAT, WTHQ, KWKC, and KNKI.
24	Salisbury, Maryland's WSCL goes off the air when their tower is damaged by lightning. The station planned to resurface on a "stand-by" tower by the next Thursday.
24	The radio wing of Univision welcomes a new president, Jose Valle, who has previously worked at both Univision radio and television stations.
25	A series of format flips took place: WKSW/Dayton dropped Country (and moved down a frequency from 101.7 to 101.5) to become Modern AC "Click 101.5." They were the second station this year to adopt the "Click" branding, following KLCK/Seattle. In Edmonton, CKEA dropped Triple-A for AC as "95.7 Lite FM".
28	Clear Channel Communications purchase an FM translator for Savannah, Georgia, AM talk station WTKS, allowing the station to be heard on 97.7 FM.
28	Seattle FM talk station KIRO hosts Ron Upshaw and Don O'Neill inaugurated their program Ron & Don's Operation: Airlift Japan, hoping to provide Japanese orphans with supplies.
28	It is announced that former classical radio station K-Mozart fans will hear classical music again on the Los Angeles dial. Beginning April 4, AM talk station KGIL would air classical music. The station said that the music presentation would be different from public classical station KUSC.
28	It is announced that syndicated morning host Kidd Kraddick has renewed his contract with KHKS's parent company Clear Channel Communications, where he had been working since 1993. Kraddick also introduced his new syndicated countdown show The Hollywood 5, with KHKS being one of those stations.
28	Huntington, Virginia's WXBW put an end to their variety hits format in favor of classic country.
29	KTMT/Medford, Oregon, made a return to its former Rhythmic Top 40 format as "93.7 The Beat" after spending time as an Adult Top 40.
30	Sports station WXFN in Muncie, Indiana announces they would not renew their contract with ESPN Radio, choosing instead to start airing Fox Sports.
30	Salt Lake City AM talk station KSL fell victims to copper thieves when $30,000 worth in goods were taken. The radio station's cameras recorded the theft.
31	Norfolk's WKUS started airing rhythmic AC, dropping their former urban AC format, assuming the branding "Movin' 107.7" and call letters WMOV-FM. Portland's KKOV shed the standards format in favor of talk.
31	Musician Kenny G announced that he would be hosting a radio show on Los Angeles classic jazz station KKJZ on Sundays, 7 pm to 9 pm. The show would play music varying classic jazz to modern jazz.
31	San Francisco country station KBWF was signed as the Oakland A's flagship station for their 2011–2012 season.
31	Dallas-Fort Worth station KDMX introduced a Classic Hits/Lite AC format on their HD-2 channel, calling it Sunny 102.9.
31	Boston talk station WTKK fired host Jay Severin after he made racial remarks against Mexican immigrants on the air. In 2009, Severin had been let go for ranting that Mexican immigrants were "leeches and lowest of primitives", for which he later apologized.

=== April ===
Date	Event
1	Philadelphia classic hits station WOGL unveiled a 24/7 HD channel focusing on the MLB team Philadelphia Phillies. The HD-4 channel would air Phillies-themed music, live games, and Phillies talk and player interviews.
1	It was revealed that sexual harassment complaints were also the reason WTKK talk show host Jay Severin was relieved of his on-air job. Severin implied that it is a person's privilege to sleep with his co-workers and explained that he would strictly hire female colleagues.
1	It was announced that Orlando PBS affiliate WMFE-TV would be sold after being on the air for 46 years. The station wouldn't name the buyer, only saying that they wished to pursue a stronger role in radio.
1	Daytona Beach AM talk station WNDB's transmission tower was stripped of its copper, keeping the station from broadcasting for longer than eight hours. The copper stripping cost the station $20,000 in damages. The station said in a statement that it would take $10,600 to repair the tower.
1	Talk show host Joyce Kaufman announced that she would run for Congress.
2	Univision's CEO Joe Uva stepped down, commenting that he wanted to seek other opportunities, according to a Univision statement.
2	Clear Channel's AM News/Talkers KEX/Portland and WIOD/Miami announced that they had added FM translator simulcasts. This was in exchange for allowing WAY-FM to rebroadcast on KFBW's HD3 subchannel and Reach fm to rebroadcast on WMGE's HD2 subchannel. KEX's simulcast began immediately after the deal was announced.
4	As announced on March 28, Los Angeles radio station KGIL switched to classical music approximately two minutes after midnight.
4	Non-profit health care provider HealthPartners cut its advertising deal with Twin Cities station KDWB after the CHR station aired a lyrical parody of an Eric Clapton song, "Heaven in Tears". The parody poked fun at Hmongs frequently getting pregnant at a young age.
4	Entercom Communications shuffled its Buffalo stations. WBEN began simulcasting on WLKK/Wethersfield; WLKK's previous automated classic-AAA format, "107.7 The Lake," moved to HD2 in the process.
5	It was announced that Nick Cannon would be presented with his own show called Cannon's Countdown debuting on CBS Radio and Citadel radio stations on April 23.
5	KPLV/Las Vegas officially transitioned from Adult-leaning Rhythmic Top 40 to Top 40/CHR.
5	WQHT DJ Calvin Lebrun aka Mister Cee was arrested by NYPD officers for a public lewd sexual act after he was caught engaging in oral sex with another man in a car. The two men were due to appear in a New York court in June.
6	Milwaukee talk station WISN announced that as of April 17, they had parted ways with airing Glenn Beck. The station planned to fill the time in with Jay Weber from 6 to 10 am, expanding Weber's previous time of 5 to 8 am.
6	Basketball team Minnesota Timberwolves switched to KFAN from WCCO, along with hockey team Minnesota Wild leaving KFAN and moving to WCCO.
6	Los Angeles CHR KIIS announced they had signed a deal with gossip website JustJared, agreeing to air JustJared entries.
6	Glenn Beck announced that his Fox News television program would be coming to an end in December when his contract expired. Beck said that he would continue to associate himself with Fox News. (The TV show is carried on Sirius-XM's Fox News Talk channel; Beck's terrestrial radio show, which is not associated with Fox, would continue unaffected.)
7	Miami AM talk station WIOD debuted on 100.3 thanks to a translator in Broward County.
7	The Bureau of Alcohol, Tobacco, Firearms and Explosives announced they would investigate the mysterious fire of Little Rock public radio station KUAR, saying that a sniffing police dog had discovered fire accelerant near the transmitter tower. The tower damage was estimated to be $200,000.
7	It was announced that the American Federation of Television and Radio Artists and Screen Actors Guild were heavily discussing merging into one. The two groups had previously tried merging but this was never completed due to disapproval from the SAG.
7	New York Police announced that they had arrested two men who were believed to be responsible for the slaying of Corey McGriff aka "DJ Megatron," providing a video in which Richard Cromwell, 20 and William Williams who is 21 admit to killing the disc jockey.
8	KKSF/San Francisco shifted from Classic Rock to Classic Hits as "Oldies 103.7"; WROX/Norfolk evolved from Alternative to Modern Hot AC.
8	Salisbury, Maryland's WQJZ traded in their Soft/Urban AC format after 15 years for classic hits adopting "The Wave" as their new branding.
8	It was announced that Washington D.C. hip-hop/R&B station WPGC would go into shutdown mode as a stunt over the weekend after an agreement over contest prize money failed. The station said they would still play music over the weekend.
8	Adult standards WBBD in Wheeling, West Virginia rebranded themselves as "Wheeling's Real Oldies" and adopted the classic hits format.
8	Seattle's classical station KING announced that they would go from being a commercial to a public station, two weeks early as planned. The station explained that transitioning to public would allow them to play more classical music and would depend on listener contributions.
8	An Ottawa court finds a 15-year-old boy, whose name was not released, guilty of many harassment charges including threatening to kill DJ Ryan Lindsay. The boy was also responsible for harassing an Industry Canada investigator Mylène Quesnel and DJ John Miekle.
8	Radio personality Tom Leykis said that he would donate $50,000 to help catch the people responsible for beating San Francisco Giants fan Bryan Stow at Dodger Stadium, calling the event "shocking". The fan was in critical condition at Los Angeles-USC Medical Center with a fractured skull.
9	The late Nashville radio personality Coyote McCloud's memorial service was set for Sunday, April 10 at the Hard Rock Café in Nashville.
11	Public radio station WITC in Cazenovia, New York was back on the air thanks to a borrowed transmitter from fellow public station Hobart and William Smith Colleges-owned WHWS-LP.
11	Clarksville, Tennessee religious station WQZQ debuted, airing on the 830 AM frequency.
12	The CRTC approved the merger between Sirius Canada and XM Radio Canada. Both companies would become Sirius XM Canada under the ownership of Canadian Satellite Radio Holdings.
12	Cumulus Media announced that 14 Cumulus and Citadel stations would be spun off to comply with FCC rules as part of their purchase of Citadel Broadcasting.
12	It was announced that Sirius XM would move their headquarters to 100 Church Street in Lower Manhattan. When asked for a statement, the building's owners refused to comment.
12	Clear Channel-owned gospel station KHLR was sold to Signal Media for $2 million.
13	The tower for Nashville country music station WSM, which had stood since 1932, was recognized as a national landmark by the National Register of Historic Places. The Register commented that the station had "assisted our military's defense efforts" in the Cold War era.
13	The Yolanda Adams Show announced that they raised $1,109,351 in donations for the St. Jude Children's Research Hospital. The show had been raising money for the hospital since 2008, and received a total of more than $400,000,000 in donations.
13	Two native Texas maintenance workers were killed when they fell 340 feet while developing another segment for the tower with two other employees. The workers were identified as Laredo native Ernesto Garcia and Paul Aliss from Mesquite.
13	A management team led by Magic Johnson and Yucaipa Companies acquired Phoenix radio outlets KVIB, KKFR and KEXX. The three outlets would continue to operate under the name of its former parent company Riviera Broadcast Group.
14	Ravenshaw Radio, a community station, is launched at Ravenshaw University, Cuttack, Odisha, India, by the Vice-Chancellor, Devdas Chhotray.
15	San Francisco country music station KBWF turned from country music to sports, assuming "SportsRadio 95.7" as their new branding. This followed after the station's parent company stated that the Oakland A's games would air on the station.
15	Washington, D.C., news station WAGE reformatted themselves as an Asian-language station, moving from the 1200 frequency to 1190.
15	Fredericksburg, Virginia news/talk station WFVA switched gears to adult standards, adopting "The Songs You Remember" as their branding.
18	Baton Rouge WTGE dropped country music and switched to talk. Local station KYPY subsequently switched to country music after WTGE retired from playing country.
18	Pamal Broadcasting announced that they would sell seven of their Gainesville-area stations, including WTMG, WHHZ, WKZY, WDVH-FM, WDVH (AM), WRZN, and WTMN to MARC Radio.
18	Nashville classic hits station WVOL announced that they had been vandalized for the second time in three months, with the damage valued at one million dollars. The vandals smashed the station van's windshield.
18	Talk host Glenn Beck announced that he had put his New Caanan, Connecticut mansion on the market, explaining that he was eager to leave New York.
18	Charleston-Myrtle Beach station WWIK retired their Hot AC in favor of classic hits, assuming "Fun FM" as their new branding.
19	Tallahassee Catholic AM station WCVC announced that they had been vandalized, causing the station to go off the air over the weekend, and that their mixing board and digital satellite receiver were missing. On Tuesday morning, WCVC informed listeners that they were back on the air.
19	Recent tornadoes in North Carolina caused the transmitter for AM stations WCLY and WQDR to crash down.
20	After a two-year absence from the Los Angeles airwaves, Rick Dees was rehired by Clear Channel/Los Angeles (he had last worked for them as the morning host at Top 40 KIIS-FM until 2004) to be the new morning host at Rhythmic AC KHHT. He was scheduled to start on May 4.
20	The White House announced that Washington Hot AC WIAD on-air personality Tommy McFly would be the emcee for the 133rd 2011 White House Easter Egg Roll.
21	Two stations debuted in Detroit. 104.7 The Oasis would use a translator to simulcast the smooth jazz format on WGPR's HD2 station. 94.3 The Bone, through another translator would simulcast an alternative rock format on the HD3 Channel. Both were owned by Martz Communications Group, based in San Francisco.
22	The Canadian Radio-television and Telecommunications Commission gave Haliburton the green light to debut an A/C station on the 95.7 dial.
25	Sergei Rachmaninoff's Piano Concerto No. 2 is announced as the new number one in the Classic FM Hall of Fame annual poll, displacing Ralph Vaughan Williams' "The Lark Ascending" after four years at the top.
25	Two more stations join the FM News/Talk bandwagon: WKIM/Memphis and WPHR-FM/West Palm Beach.
25	New York City AM news/talk station WCBS's meteorologist Craig Allen celebrates 30 years as the lead weather anchor. In February, Allen had signed a three-year extension for the CBS radio station.
25	Jacksonville station WSJF ends its run with album adult alternative, choosing to air classic hits instead. The station would assume the call letters WYRE-FM.
25	Orlando AM news/talk station WDBO announces they will upgrade their FM frequency from 95.7 to 95.9. The station's translator was previously at 376 feet, and after the upgrade would measure at 680 feet.
25	The FCC announces that they are auctioning 92.7 in Lawrence Park Township, Pennsylvania, with the bid starting at $100,000.
26	Minnesota WGVX/KQRS sales manager Daniel McKeague is announced as Gilbert Gottfried's replacement as the Aflac Duck.
28	Los Angeles news/talk station KNX is fined $10,000 for failing to replace their NOTAM tower light.
29	Westwood One sells Metro Traffic to Clear Channel.

=== May ===
Date	Event
1	Rhythmic Top 40 KDPM/Eugene went silent as the station was sold to a Catholic group.
2	Madison, Georgia, adult standards station WYTH's transmission is damaged, after being in use since 1955. The station was back on the air through a different antenna.
2	Seattle classical station KING-FM shifts from commercial to non-commercial at midnight, airing "Ode to Joy" by Beethoven.
4	Sirius XM revamps its entire lineup, with all the separate channels on Sirius and XM corresponding on the same channel, with some exceptions, on both services.
4	KEZE/Spokane returns to the Rhythmic Top 40 format after spending nearly three years in Country and Triple-A, respectively. The move brings the number of Top 40s in Spokane to three, as they take on rival Rhythmic KGZG-FM and mainstream KZBD.
5	Oshkosh, Wisconsin classic hits station WISS replaces the format with news/talk, signing up as a Fox News Radio flag station.
5	Gabriel Garcia who was operating an unlicensed station, KNRG, was fined $25,000 after repeatedly resurrecting the station despite FCC warnings.
9	The "golden voice" announcer, Ted Williams, announces he will be returning to rehab for emotional reasons. Williams' show and book plans were placed on hold following the news.
14	Political activist and radio host Herman Cain announces he will be participating in the 2012 presidential election.
16	Despite a forest fire that burned down their transmitter and studios, Slave Lake CHSL-FM maintains the feed through their Facebook page and website. The station's owner comments that plans are already in place for a new studio.
18	CHSL-FM announces its return to the airwaves.
20	After a 13-year run, the Ace & TJ Show abruptly comes to an end after its two hosts announced that they have decided not to renew their contract with flagship station WNKS/Charlotte.
20	WNNF/Cincinnati dropped Triple-A for Adult Top 40 as "Journey 94.1."
21	AM daytimer WPYT/Pittsburgh flipped from Talk to Urban as "WAMO 100.1," using the legendary call letters that were used in Pittsburgh from 1960 to 2009. The station would use a 99 watt FM translator to cover the area.
24	WPRT/Nashville flipped from Rhythmic Top 40 to Hot AC, but continued to use "The Party" moniker.
24	Clinton, Tennessee country AM station WYSH announced that they would install solar panels on the station's roof, making them the first solar powered radio station.
25	Portland sports station KXTG moved from the FM frequency 95.5 to AM 750 at 5 pm. The 95.5 frequency then flipped to female-targeted Adult Top 40 as "Live 95.5" and changed its call letters to KBFF.
27	Top 40 WDKF and AC sister station WLQT/Dayton swap signals. WDKF goes from 94.5 to 99.9, while WLQT moves from the latter to the former.
31	WIHB/Charleston dropped its year-old Urban format to become the new home for sister station WIOP's Country format. After a week of simulcasting, WIOP replaced the Country format with Adult Contemporary as "Lite 95.9".

=== June ===
Date	Event
1	After serving the African-American community for 38 years, WILD/Boston switched formats to Chinese programming under a leasing deal between owner Radio One and China Radio International.
8	Sirius XM Radio replaced the five XM channels operated by Clear Channel – KISS-XM, Nashville!, Mix, Music Summit, and Bollywood & Beyond – with simulcasts of Clear Channel O&Os KIIS-FM, WSIX-FM, WLTW, WHTZ and WGCI respectively.
13	KSWN/McCook, Nebraska, dropped Adult Top 40 for Top 40/CHR as "93.9 The Zone".
17	WWWQ-HD2/Atlanta, a translator broadcasting at 97.9 and the HD2 subchannel of Top 40/CHR WWWQ, launched an Adult Top 40 format as "Journey 97.9". The musical direction was the same as sister station WNNF/Cincinnati.
17	A major shakeup resulted in Houston outlet KHPT releasing its airstaff and dropping the Classic Alternative format. The station became a simulcast of Classic Hits sister KGLK on June 20.
28	WWNQ/Columbia dropped Classic Hits for Top 40/CHR as "Q94".
30	Two Las Vegas area stations, KXLI and KYLI, changed formats to become 24/7 interactive radio stations branded as Jelli, with KXLI switching to a Rock format and KYLI changing to Top 40 Remix.
30	CJOT/Ottawa shifted from AC to Classic Hits as "Boom 99.7"
30	The Gen-X format arrived in New Orleans, as KOBW dropped 80s-based Classic Rock to become Adult Top 40/Retro hybrid "Voodoo 104.1".
30	106.7 Dream FM (owned by ABC/TV5 Philippines signed off for the final time as UBSI acquired the radio station as 106.7 Energy FM on July 1.

=== July ===
Date	Event
1	New Orleans got its first Spanish FM outlet, as KXMG debuted as "Mega 107.5".
1	WWNQ ended the "Q94" stunt for Classic Country branded as "Country Legends 94.3".
1	Tampa station WPOI flipped 80s & 90s "The Point" for the CHR format as "Hot 101.5".
4	WTOK/San Juan dropped Spanish AC for a Top 40 presentation (consisting of English-language CHR hits) as "Hot 102."
5	WFKS in Jacksonville rebranded its Top 40 format from "Kiss FM" to "Radio NOW".
7	KZZQ/Salt Lake City dropped Active Rock for a simulcast of sister station KZNS.
14	CBS radio announced that WCFS/Chicago would drop its AC format on August 1 to become a simulcast of all News sister station WBBM. This move was due to what would be an eventual flip to the same format coming from Modern Rock WKQX, which took place on July 29. Meanwhile, WKQX's sister station in New York City, WRXP, ended the Modern Rock format July 15. The station would switch to "FM News 101.9," an all-news format (similar to that of sister WWWN) on August 12.
15	WMYI/Greenville segued from AC to Hot AC as "Fresh 102.5."
18	Family Radio's WKDN/Philadelphia announced that they would change their license status from non-commercial to commercial.
19	KHLR/Little Rock flipped from Gospel to Rhythmic Oldies as "Heartbeat 106.7".
21	Lexington, Kentucky, picked up a second Urban outlet, as W280DO, a translator simulcast of Top 40 WLKT's HD2 subchannel, debuted as "WiLD 103.9."
25	WZJZ/Ft. Myers flipped from Rhythmic AC to Top 40/CHR as "Y100," using the same format and logo as its sister station in Miami.
28	Clear Channel launched yet another Urban HD2/Translator, as it flipped W281AB, a former simulcast of AM outlet WJLD and the HD2 subchannel of WMJJ, to Hip-Hop intensive "104.1 The Beat."
29	KSOC/Dallas-Ft. Worth dropped Urban AC for Urban Oldies as "Old School 94.5."

=== August ===
Date	Event
1	Triton Media Group, parent company of Dial Global, announces that they would acquire Westwood One for $250 million. When the deal was closed in late October, the combined company mostly retired the "Westwood One" name in favor of "The Dial Global Radio Networks"; a notable exception includes the onetime "CBS Radio Sports" programming and play-by-play packages, including The NFL on Westwood One.
1	Sporting News Radio announced that it would rebrand as Yahoo! Sports Radio.
3	Univision Radio unveiled a smartphone app for its radio stations.
3	Smooth Jazz was silenced in Orlando, as new owners flipped WLOQ to Spanish Top 40 as "KQ103," modeling its format after WKAQ/San Juan. The calls WHKQ went into effect on August 1.
4	CBS Radio announced that WKRK/Cleveland would end its automated Alternative Rock format on August 29, and would flip to sports talk as "92.3 The Fan." Adam "The Bull" Gerstenhaber, weekend/swing host at WFAN in New York, signed on as afternoon co-host, and former Fox Sports Radio personalities Kevin Kiley and Chuck Booms reunited for the morning drive.
5	Connoisseur Media sold their Des Moines radio outlets KZHZ and KZHC to Iowa Public Radio, who would convert the two stations into non-commercial outlets. As a result, KZHZ became the second station in Des Moines to drop the Rhythmic format after its sale to IPR.
8	Townsquare Media announced the acquisition of Double O Radio.
11	KESS dissolved its "La Kalle" (Latin Pop) format for the simulcast of KDXX "Recuerdo" (Spanish Oldies) format.
15	SiriusXM channel 15 became Studio 54 radio, bringing back the classic dance format last heard on satellite radio as "The Strobe". This came after BBC Radio 1 was dropped from the lineup, and moved online.
15	Univision sold KLTO/San Antonio to EMF, thus ending its Top 40 format after the sale was completed.
17	CFUN Vancouver flipped Classic Hits "Fun FM" to CHR "Sonic".
17	WMGM Atlantic City shifted Classic rock "103.7 The Shark" to Mainstream Rock with the name "103.7 WMGM Rocks."
18	CBS Radio announces the move of Philadelphia Sportsradio 610 WIP to the FM dial replacing Classic rock sister station WYSP. The switch took place on September 2.
19	WHTQ/Orlando dropped its Active Rock format to become a simulcast of News/Talk sister station WDBO.
25	Radio One announced that starting on September 1, Urban AC WRNB/Philadelphia would relocate from 107.9 to 100.3, replacing WPHI and its Urban Contemporary format. WPHI moved over to WRNB's former frequency and relaunched their Urban format on September 8.
26	CFLZ/Niagara Falls, Ontario, dropped Triple-A for Variety Hits as 105.1 ED FM.
29	Three stations made the flip to Sports: Adult Top 40 WPRT-FM/Nashville, the Urban AC FM translator of WHGB/Harrisburg, and WKRK/Cleveland.
30	Sister stations KZTQ and KWNZ/Reno swapped signals, with KZTQ going from 97.3 to 93.7 and retaining its Adult Hits format, while Top 40/CHR KWNZ returned to its original home at the 97.3 signal and relaunched its former Rhythmic Top 40 format after seven years, taking the new moniker "Swag 97.3."
31	Sports FM came to Biloxi, as WUJM dropped the Classic Country format to become "The Champ."
31	Just five years after selling it to Radio One, Davis Broadcasting reacquired WQNC and WPZS/Charlotte from the former.
31	KYOT/Phoenix officially transitioned from "The Coyote" to "Eva," completing its shift from Smooth Jazz to Gold-based Rhythmic AC.

=== September ===
Date	Event
1	91.7 FM (Port Harcourt), a new English-language mixed news, talk, and music radio station, is launched in Nigeria.
1	KYMV/Salt Lake City exited the MOViN' brand for 80s-based Variety Hits as "Rewind 100.7"
2	WTMP-AM & FM/Tampa's 57-year run as an Urban outlet came to an end as its new owners flipped the stations to a Spanish format.
2	Two Cumulus Media outlets, Top 40/CHR WJLQ/Pensacola and Country WWFF/Huntsville, flip to the Hot AC "Journey" brand. At the same in Pensacola, WRGV responded to WJLQ's format flip by shifting from Rhythmic to Top 40/CHR as "107.3 Hit Music Now!"
2	WLZT/Columbus began stunting in anticipation for a flip from Soft AC to Oldies on September 6.
2	WLND/Chattanooga flipped from Soft AC to Variety Hits as "98.1 The Lake."
2	KBZC/Sacramento dropped the All-90s format for Rhythmic AC, putting it in direct competition with KHYL.
2	CKAC/Montreal dropped its French Sports format for all-traffic, the second of its kind in Canada (after Vancouver) and the first French-language station to adopt the format. As a result of the flip, the station moved its broadcasts of Montreal Canadiens, Montreal Impact and Montreal Alouettes games over to CHMP.
6	Another Montreal outlet made a format adjustment, as CFQR flips from AC to Rhythmic Hot AC as "9–2–5 The Beat." They also retired the CFQR calls on September 9 after 45 years to take the new calls CKBE to match "The Beat" handle.
8	WARM/York shifted from AC to Adult Top 40 and adopts the "Wink" moniker, mirroring its sister station in Harrisburg.
9	WPGC/Washington, D.C.'s HD2 subchannel, which had offered a Hip-Hop format featuring local artists, was replaced with a Dance Top 40 format.
9	WMKK/Boston dropped Variety Hits for a simulcast of sister Sports Talk WEEI.
12	KRXV-KHWY-KHYZ/Barstow-Mountain Pass, California-Las Vegas dropped Hot AC and their 31-year-old "Highway Radio" slogan for Dance Hits, and took the "Vibe" moniker, which was formerly used at Las Vegas' KVBE.
12	Another format flip took place in Reno, as longtime Alternative KRZQ-FM switched to Adult Top 40 as "Mix 100.9." Also joining the Adult Top 40 fray was KLZK/Lubbock, who traded in AC to become "Yes 97.3."
16	WGMY/Tallahassee dropped Adult Top 40 for Top 40/CHR as "107.1 Hit Music NOW!"
16	Another format shift took place in Columbus, Ohio, as Urban AC WXMG relocated from 98.9 to 106.3, replacing WJYD and its Gospel format. WXMG's former frequency was then launched as Adult Hits "98.9 Jack FM."
16	Cumulus Media acquired Citadel Broadcasting and its assets.
19	WVRX Washington, D.C., departed the classic rock format once again, becoming a simulcast of talk station WMAL.
26	KZDX/Twin Falls, Idaho, dropped its long running CHR/Active Rock hybrid format as 99.9 the buzz for a more conventional Adult top 40 as Hot 100.
27	Cumulus took back ownership of KMJK/Kansas City due to the market now gaining another FM signal, thus increasing the limit of how many stations one can own in Kansas City .
30	WJOE/Ft. Wayne dropped News/Talk for an interactive R&B/Hip-Hop format, billed as "ClickHop.com".

=== October ===
Date	Event
1	KSKR Roseburg flipped from sports to CHR, under the branding Jelli.
5	A shakeup at Rhythmic Oldies KGMG/Tucson took place as the entire airstaff and PD are fired. The station was expected to flip to a Rhythmic AC format.
12	Clear Channel and EMF announced that K-Love and Air1 had been added to Clear Channel's iHeartRadio platform, starting on October 17.
17	WEZW/Cape May, New Jersey, became the first station in the United States to flip to Christmas music for the 2011 holiday season.
17	WPTY/Long Island flipped from Rhythmic/Dance Top 40 to Gold-leaning Rhythmic AC.
18	The FCC ordered Martz Communications Group to take W284BQ/Detroit, a translator broadcasting a Smooth Jazz format, off the air after it received complaints from Clear Channel Communications that the 104.7 frequency signal and coverage was interfering with the latter's Toledo outlet, WIOT, who also resides at the same frequency.
19	WVTT/Kane, Pennsylvania, swapped with WBYB/Portville, New York, so that WVTT was then on 96.7 in Portville while WBYB took over 103.9 in Kane. At the same time, the 96.7 frequency switched to a simulcast of the talk format on 103.9, displacing the country music format on that channel to low-power translators and HD radio.
20	KVGS/Las Vegas dropped Alternative for Adult Hits as "107.9 Bob FM."
24	After 47 years of being owned and operated by The International Free and Accepted Modern Masons, WGPR/Detroit was LMAd to Radio One, where it replaced the Urban AC format with WHTD's current Urban format. WHTD flipped to Gospel as "Praise 102.7."
26	After eight years as an Urban station, Columbia, South Carolina's WXBT dropped its format at 1 pm and started simulcasting sister station AM news/talk WVOC.
26	Clear Channel Communications eliminated hundreds of positions as part of an effort to streamline their operations.
27	Saga Communications quietly acquired the format and intellectual property of Rhythmic Top 40 KZHZ/Des Moines from Connoisseur Media and relaunched the format on both KIOA 93.3-HD2 and on translator K260AM as "Hits 99.9," upon the closing of KZHZ's sale to IPR.
27	Portage, Wisconsin news/talk station WPDR changed to oldies.
28	Radio One announced that they would drop the Gospel format of KROI/Houston for an all-news format. The flip took place on November 21, and the Gospel format moved over to the HD2 subchannel of sister station KMJQ.
28	KSGX Seattle stunted with Halloween music as "Freddy 104.9". The station would flip to Active Rock on November 1.
28	WMGC in Detroit began stunting with Christmas music. It was speculated that the station was expected to flip to a sports format, but on December 26, it returned to AC, rebranded as "Soft Rock 105.1."
31	WRNX/Springfield, Massachusetts' 21-year run as a Triple-A outlet came to an end as it flipped to Country.

=== November ===
Date	Event
1	Radio24syv, a Danish public service talk radio station, owned by Berlingske Media and PeopleGroup, is launched. Often credited with reviving Danish talk radio, it continued broadcasting until 2019.
4	Two Clear Channel O&Os flipped formats: Top 40/CHR WDTW/Detroit to Classic Rock, and Country KNBQ/Seattle to a Sports simulcast of KJR-AM.
5	The original transmission towers for WBZ, atop the Westinghouse Electric factory in East Springfield, Massachusetts, were taken down, 90 years after the station signed on from the towers. They had not been used since the 1962 closure of synchronous repeater WBZA (which had been located there after WBZ's move to Boston in 1931).
7	Another Clear Channel outlet adjusted format, with KUSS/San Diego dropping Country to simulcast News/Talk KOGO.
7	In Weslaco, Texas, thieves took the KBFM van from a restaurant parking lot and torched it after stripping the vehicle of its equipment.
9	Sacramento, California sports station KHTK rebranded from Sports 1140 to Sports Radio 1140 The Fan.
12	Flagstaff, Arizona Hot AC station KFSZ changed to CHR and assumed "Hits106" as its branding.
14	Grand Rapids, Michigan Spanish pop station WNWZ changed to a comedy format.
16	CBS Radio acquired WFSI/Annapolis from Family Radio. CBS then relocated WLZL's Spanish format to WFSI's 107.9 frequency on December 1, paving the way WLZL's 99.1 signal to be launched as an all-news station serving both the Washington, D.C., and Baltimore metropolitan areas starting in January 2012.
18	Clear Channel station KWMT-FM Tucson flipped Modern AC "The Mountain" for Hot AC as "My 92.9."
21	WBBB Raleigh rebranded "96 Rock" and became "Radio 96.1."
22	KSMJ/Bakersfield added an FM simulcast of sister news talk station KNZR, replacing adult contemporary "Mix 97.7."
23	WDAS-AM returned to Philadelphia after a four-year absence, this time as an urban oldies station.
26	CHNK/Winnipeg shifted from mainstream rock to Christmas music as "The Lounge". They retired the CHNK calls to take the new calls CFJL. On December 26, the station switched to Soft AC "The Breeze."
28	Austin Christian station KNLE caught fire after an electrical malfunction in the building's attic, causing $11,000 in equipment and building damage.

=== December ===
Date	Event
1	Two more Clear Channel outlets flipped formats: KGBY/Sacramento from Adult Top 40 to a simulcast of News/Talk sister KFBK, and KDZA-FM/Colorado Springs from Active Rock to Classic Rock.
1	Hawaiian AC KINE/Honolulu became the first station in the United States to adopt a Christmas music format based around Hawaiian music.
5	Ridgecrest, California country station KZIQ changed from country to Hot AC.
5	Cumulus Media and Clear Channel announced a deal that brought all of Cumulus' radio stations onto the iHeartRadio platform.
6	Merlin Media acquired WKDN Philadelphia from Family Radio.
8	Radio Sapientia 95.3FM Onitsha, a private commercial station, is launched by Sapientia International Media Centre in Onitsha, Anambra State, Nigeria.
9	Following the abrupt flip of Hot AC station KGBY to a simulcast of KFBK, Entercom/Sacramento flipped the format of KBZC from Rhythmic Hot AC "The Buzz" to Hot AC as "Star 106.5."
12	Chicago Spanish AC simulcast stations WVIV-FM and WVIX would be rebranded as Maxima 93.5/103.1.
12	KORL-FM/Honolulu became the first station in the US to use all four of its HD radio signals. The main signal flipped from Smooth Jazz to Hot AC, the Smooth Jazz format moved over to its HD2 subchannel, the HD3 channel debuted with a Korean Pop ("K-Pop") format and the HD4 channel was launched with a Japanese Pop ("J-Pop") format. The three HD subchannels would be heard on their FM translators as well.
15	Progressive Talk came to Milwaukee, as WXXM/Madison began simulcasting on Urban sister station WKKV's HD3 subchannel.
16	WSNQ/Cape May Court House, New Jersey, broke away from simulcasting Rhythmic sister station WZBZ after four years to broadcast a Classic Hits format as "Sunny 105.5."
19	Smooth AC returned to Cleveland as WNWV reverted to "The Wave" upon the station's sale from Elyria-Lorain Broadcasting to the Akron, Ohio-based Rubber City Radio Group. This came after WNWV spent two years as an AAA station.
19	After spending a year with a Gen-X format, WCGX/Columbus, Ohio returned to its former Alternative format and rebilled itself as "X106.7."
19	Astral Media acquired CHHR/Vancouver for $13.4 million (CDN).
21	Harvard Broadcasting acquired Rhythmic Top 40 CJNW/Edmonton from local owner John Charles Yerxa, who decided to sell the station due to health issues.
22	WPGC/Washington fires Big Tigger on his 39th birthday, after 18 years with the station.
25	Minneapolis-St.Paul got another Country outlet, as WLTE dropped AC to become "Buz'n 102.9." The AC format moved over to the HD2 subchannel of Adult Hits sister KZJK.
26	WLTQ-FM Sarasota shifted to Adult contemporary as "92.1 The Coast".
26	WGEX Albany, Georgia, lost its "Gen-X" format for Top 40, going as "97.3 Hit Music Now."
27	WLJY/Wausau, Wisconsin, dropped AC for Top 40/CHR as "Hot 96.7".
27	KKMY/Beaumont, Texas, dropped AC for Rhythmic Top 40 as "104.5 KISS-FM".
27	WMT-FM/Cedar Rapids dropped their Adult Top 40 format and started simulcasting sister Country KKSY. KKSY flipped to News/Talk sister station WMT-AM on January 2, 2012, and eventually took the KWMG call letters; WMT-FM then became KKSY-FM.
30	Hitz 247, a youth contemporary hit radio-formatted internet radio station, is launched in Melbourne, Australia. It was Andrew Gyopar and originated from former aspirant community station Hitz FM.

== Debuts ==
Date	Event
January 3	Tom Tancredo, former Congressman, presidential and gubernatorial candidate, joined KVOR as evening host.
January 4	Jeff Douglas joined CBC Radio One as co-host of As It Happens.
January 24	Robert Wuhl and Douglas Urbanski joined Westwood One.
January 28	Wanted sa Radyo, a weekday public affairs programme, begins on Radyo5 92.3 News FM in the Philippines.
February 24	Sirius XM Radio and Premiere Radio Networks launched a 24/7 channel based around Nikki Sixx's syndicated program Sixx Sense with Nikki Sixx, on XM channel 161.
February 28	WTSR, owned by the College of New Jersey, was now the new home of the minor league baseball team Trenton Thunder.
March 4	Hardwell On Air, a weekly radio show created and hosted by Dutch DJ and record producer Hardwell, is launched at Breda, Netherlands.
April 13	TSN launched "TSN Radio," a Canadian version of ESPN Radio. The network would broadcast primarily on former members of The Team, which folded in 2002.
May 2	Five time Grammy nominee pianist David Benoit debuted as a morning host on Los Angeles classic jazz station KKJZ.
June 25	WXYG/St. Cloud, Minnesota, debuted with a Classic Rock format targeting 45- to 65-year-olds. It was one of the few new AM stations to sign on in recent years.
July 10	The Gascony Show, an English-language radio chat show for the southwest of France and a flagship Sunday evening programme broadcast on Radio Coteaux, hosted by John Slattery, is launched.
July 29	CFJL/Winnipeg debuted with a Top 40/CHR format, branded as "Energy 106". They would be the market's second Top 40, as they took on the more adult-leaning rival CKMM. On November 23, CFJL changed its call letters to CHWE to match its on-air handle.
August 5	The HD2 trance/electronica subchannel Trancid relaunched after a three-year absence, joining Club Phusion, Pride Radio and Spin Cycle as part of the Dance genre offerings on Clear Channel's iHeartRadio roster.
October 3	Toronto got its first Urban AC outlet, as CKFG debuted.
October 27	WLKW-FM/Celoron, New York, signed on the air.

== Endings ==
Date	Event
January 21	Fred Thompson leaves Westwood One, to be replaced by Douglas Urbanski.
February 5	Trackslistan, a chart programme on Swedish Radio channel SR P3, broadcasts its last episode.
March 16	Garrison Keillor announces he will retire from A Prairie Home Companion in 2013. He changed his mind later in the year and did not announce his replacement, Chris Thile, until 2015, postponing his retirement until 2016.
April 4	KJCB/Lafayette, Louisiana, was forced off the air after the FCC canceled their license and they lost their transmitter lease. The owners vowed to fight this setback.
April 12	Tom Bigby, vice president of CBS Strategic Programming, announced he would be retiring after 23 years. He commented that he would still consult stations on programming strategy. Bigby first joined Infinity Broadcasting (later called CBS Radio) in 1989 at AM sports station WIP.
April 18	Toronto public station CKLN-FM went off the air after 28 years when their license was pulled following numerous broadcasting violations including quality issues.
April 19	Broadcasting school Columbia Academy of Vancouver closes its doors after running for 45 years, citing financial issues. The school had been sold in the autumn of 2010.
May 6	Charles McCord retires from radio after 48 years, 40 of them at the right hand of Don Imus for Imus in the Morning.
May 10	Bob Allen announces that he is retiring from KUVA after 51 years in both radio and TV, but will remain working as a consultant.
May 16	K.T. Mills ends a 20-year run with WALK-FM.
May 27	Char Binkley retires after 35 years at Christian station WBCL.
May 31	Tom Sheldon retires from WFIN after 45 years in radio.
May 31	WDOD/Chattanooga, Tennessee, leaves the air after 86 years because of the sale of its transmitter site to the Baylor School; the license is surrendered to the FCC.
June 3	WPAY/Portsmouth, Ohio, signed off the air after 78 years, due to the loss of its staff following the sale of its FM sister station to Western Kentucky University.
July 1	New Jersey Network signs off at Midnight. NJN's nine public radio stations were sold off, four of them becoming New Jersey Public Radio, affiliated with WNYC, and five going to WHYY-FM.
July 13	Boise State University sells KBSU/Boise to Impact Radio (who would take full ownership through a LMA prior to completion of the sale), ending its status as the market's only non-commercial outlet on the AM band.
August 1	Smooth jazz is no longer heard on Canadian terrestrial radio, after the last station carrying the format, CIWV, changed to country music as CHKX.
August 25	WNCX/Cleveland drops The Maxwell Show, hosted by Benjamin "Maxwell" Bornstein, after less than ten months, because of low ratings. Morning drive was temporarily filled by Dominic Nardella (in an uncredited role), formerly the program director of sister station WKRK-FM – which itself changed formats to sports talk.
September 1	Steve Malzberg is dismissed from his nationally syndicated show on WOR Radio Network; David Paterson would replace Malzberg on flagship station WOR, whose show would not be syndicated.
September 11	Americana, originally touted as the "successor to the late Alistair Cooke's Letter from America." broadcasts its final episode on BBC Radio 4.
October (dpedate unknown)	KTRS general manager and co-owner Tom Dorsey steps down as GM after 35 years. He would continue to hold ownership of the station, despite his leave.
October 26	Longtime on-air personality Porky Chedwick announces that he will retire after 63 years in the radio business, citing lack of sponsors as the cause of his retirement.
December 5	WSTV/Steubenville, Ohio, shuts down after 71 years.
December 6	Cogeco shuts down CJTS-FM/Sherbrooke after failing to find a buyer as required in its purchase of Corus Québec.
December 16	Longtime Minneapolis-St. Paul GM Marc Kalman retires after 40 years in the radio business.
December 20	WAY-FM takes Urban WWPW/Louisville off the air after Radio Multi-Media, the company that was leasing the station under a LMA, files for bankruptcy.

== Deaths ==
Date	Name	Age	Notability	Source
January	Doug Hoerth	66	Talk radio host at WTAE, KDKA, WWSW and WPTT in Pittsburgh; died "several days" prior to January 25	
January 11	David Nelson	74	American television/radio actor and producer	
January 15	Royal Marshall	43	Producer and sidekick for nationally syndicated host Neal Boortz	
January 20	Liz Dribben	73	Radio and television host in Buffalo and New York City	
February 10	Jon Petrovich	63	Former executive with the Associated Press broadcast unit and with CNN	
February 11	Ludlow Porch	76	American radio humorist	
February 25	Eneas Perdomo	80	Venezuelan popular singer who began his career in radio	
March 11	Danny Stiles	87	American radio host; was on four stations at the time of his death	
March 12	Derry Brownfield	79	Agriculture-oriented radio host and businessman	
March 17	Terry Preston	85	1940s and 1950s era DJ in Bakersfield, California and in Missouri; better known as a country singer under his birth name, Ferlin Husky	
March 21	Kjeld Tolstrup	45	Danish radio disc jockey (DR P3)	
March 26	Corey McGriff	32	Radio DJ/remixer and former airstaffer at WQHT/New York City who went by the alias "DJ Megatron"	
March 31	Tom Whalen	88	Longtime broadcaster at WBEN	
April 7	Coyote McCloud	68	Nashville radio host	
April 21	Tine Bryld	71	Danish social worker, writer, radio host and letters editor	
April 21	Dave Michaels	60	Midday host/program director on Classic Hits Radio	
April 27	Joseph Mazza	68	Nationally syndicated overnight radio host	
April 27	Jim Mandich	62	Miami Dolphins player, sportscaster	
April 27	Harry Thuillier	85	Irish Olympic fencer and radio presenter	
May 1	Osama bin Laden	54	Saudi-born leader of the al-Qaeda terrorist organization responsible for the September 11, 2001 attacks, including the destruction of the World Trade Center in New York City, which resulted in several radio and television broadcasting antennas being destroyed along with the buildings in the attacks; killed by Navy SEALs; Bin Laden's death was an immediate topic on most radio shows in the United States	
May 8	Charles McPhee	49	Syndicated radio host "Dream Doctor" who was known to help people understand their dreams	
May 20	John Cigna	74	Former KDKA on-air host for 30 years	
May 26	Tom Land	51	VP of Programming for Journal Communications	
May 30	Tillmann Uhrmacher	44	German DJ, music producer and radio host	
June 1	Jaehoon Ahn	70	North Korean-born American journalist and researcher, founding director of Radio Free Asia Korean language service	
June 2	Willem Duys	82	Dutch radio and television presenter and record producer	
June 2	Keith Smith	93	Australian radio and television personality (The Pied Piper)	
June 3	Papa Joe Chevalier	62	Las Vegas-based sports talk radio host	
June 13	Romeo Olea	49	Filipino radio journalist (DWEB)	
July 31	Rick Buckley	unknown	Owner of Buckley Broadcasting	
August 1	Jevon "Hollywood" Hotchkiss	34	On-air personality at WDTW/Detroit	
August 6	Fred Imus	69	Host of the Trailer Park Bash on Sirius XM Radio, brother of Don Imus and frequent guest on Imus in the Morning	
September 22	Chuck Collier	64	Radio personality best known for years in Cleveland, Ohio on WGAR (AM) from 1970 to 1990 and WGAR-FM from 1986 to 2011; originally an adult contemporary host on a lineup that had Don Imus, "Emperor Joe" Mayer, Bob Vernon and Norm N. Nite, he stayed with WGAR (AM) after a 1984 format switch to country music; inducted into the Country Music Radio Hall of Fame in 2009; voice-tracked middays at sister classic hits WMJI; worked for WCBS-FM in New York in the late 1970s	
October 18	Norman Corwin	101	American radio writer-producer	
October 30	Tom Keith	64	Public radio sound effects man for A Prairie Home Companion	
November 4	Andy Rooney	92	Radio and television writer, commentator and humorist	
December 11	Phillip Cottrell	43	British born New Zealand journalist (BBC Scotland, Radio New Zealand)	
December 17	Cesária Évora	70	Cape Verdean singer-songwriter, career launched on radio	
December 24	Lynn Samuels	69	Pioneering liberal talk radio host; originally at WABC, then later with Sirius XM Radio	
