= WIWA (AM) =

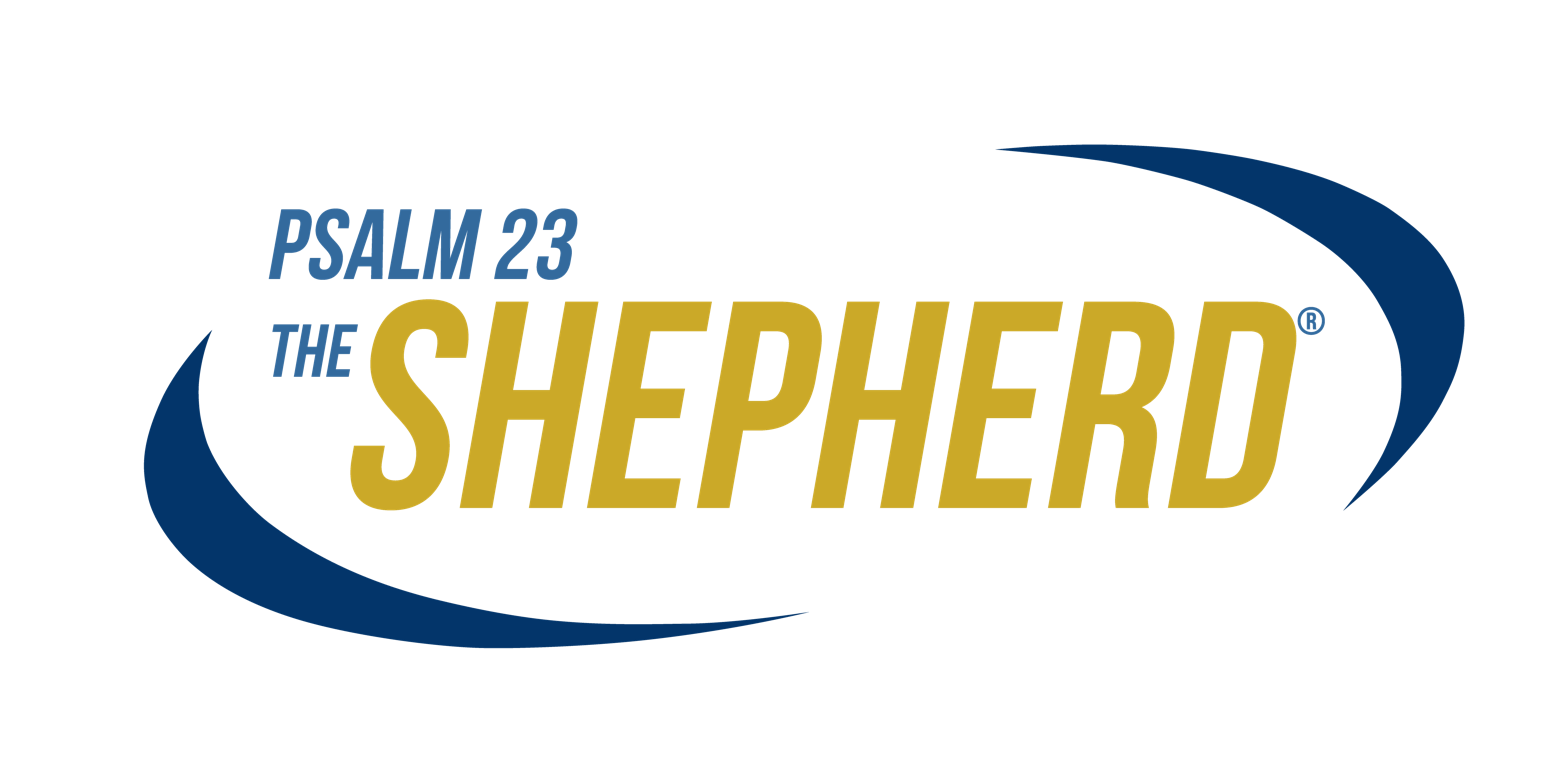

Eatonville, Florida; United States
- Broadcast area: Greater Orlando
- Frequency: 1270 kHz
- Branding: The Shepherd

Programming
- Language: English
- Format: Christian radio
- Affiliations: Salem Radio Network

Ownership
- Owner: Marc Radio Orlando, LLC
- Sister stations: WDVH, WHHZ, WPLL, WRZN, WTMG, WTMN

History
- First air date: 1957 (as WHIY Orlando)
- Former call signs: WHIY (1957–1978); WORL (1978–1988); WBZS (1988–1991); WHBS (1991–1996); WRLZ (1996–2019)

Technical information
- Licensing authority: FCC
- Facility ID: 57931
- Class: B
- Power: 25,000 watts (day); 5,000 watts (night)
- Transmitter coordinates: 28°34′03″N 81°25′38″W

Links
- Public license information: Public file; LMS
- Webcast: Listen live
- Website: TheSheperdRadio.com

WIWA (1270 AM) is a commercial radio station licensed to Eatonville, Florida, United States, and serving the Greater Orlando market. Owned by Marc Radio Orlando, LLC, it features a Christian format, with some programs simulcast on WTMN in Gainesville. The two stations have studios and offices located on NW 76th Drive in Gainesville.

WIWA's transmitter is sited on Brengle Avenue at West New Hampshire Street in Orlando.

== History ==
The station signed on the air in 1957 as WHIY, licensed to Orlando and branded as "Radio Hi Fi". In 1962, it transitioned to a country music format.

From 1978 to 1986, the station switched call signs to WORL and adopted a full service, adult contemporary music format. It spent a brief period in 1979 with a Disco music format as “Studio 13” before returning to AC the same year. By 1986, WORL 1270 was known as "Power Hits ORL".

In 1987, the station dropped AC for R&B. In late 1988, with FM on the rise, the station dropped music altogether. It began a business news format as WBZS. This lasted about one year before a switch to Spanish language programming.

WBZS, despite its call letters representing the word "Business," continued airing Spanish language programming and served the Orlando Hispanic community for the next six years. In 1991, the call letters changed to WHBS.

The station ran into financial problems and went dark in 1995. In 1996, it was revived under new ownership as WRLZ.

The station changed its call sign to WIWA on July 3, 2019. It began airing a Christian talk and teaching format, programmed along with WTMN 1430 AM in Gainesville, Florida.
