= WXJZ =

Coordinates: 29.634°N 82.314°W

- Gainesville, Florida; United States
- Broadcast area: Gainesville-Ocala, Florida
- Frequency: 100.9 MHz (HD Radio)
- Branding: 100.9 The Beach

Programming
- Format: Classic hits
- Subchannels: HD2: WDVH simulcast
- Affiliations: Compass Media Networks; Premiere Networks; United Stations Radio Networks

Ownership
- Owner: MARC Radio Group; (MARC Radio Gainesville, LLC)
- Sister stations: WDVH, WHHZ, WPLL, WRZN, WTMG, WTMN

History
- First air date: 1982 (as WMFM)
- Former call signs: WMFM (1981–1984); WYGC (1984–2002)

Technical information
- Licensing authority: FCC
- Facility ID: 3057
- Class: A
- ERP: 6,000 watts
- HAAT: 91 meters (299 ft)

Links
- Public license information: Public file; LMS
- Webcast: Listen Live
- Website: beachgainesville.com

WXJZ (100.9 FM) is a commercial radio station in Gainesville, Florida, broadcasting to the Gainesville-Ocala area. The station is owned by MARC Radio Group Gainesville, LLC and broadcasts a classic hits format branded as "100.9 The Beach".

== History ==
The station started on 104.9 MHz before moving to the frequency of the former WYGC "Gator Country 100.9". Simultaneously, WYGC moved to WXJZ's 104.9 frequency. On December 26, 2013, sister station WBXY's dance format moved over to the 100.9 signal, while JVC simulcasted the 99.5 signal until it was spun off to another company in January 2014. On September 12, 2015, at midnight, after stunting throughout September 11 with patriotic music and country songs in a tribute to the 9/11 terrorist attacks, JVC flipped the station to soft adult contemporary and bought the "Smooth 100.9" brand back to the market, with "Sailing" by Christopher Cross as its first song after the switch.

On May 23, 2016, at 6 A.M., WXJZ flipped to a simulcast of former sister station WYGC and rebranded as "100.9 WOW FM". The simulcast ended on August 4, 2016, at midnight as WYGC flipped to a news/talk format.

On August 15, 2017, WXJZ was sold to the MARC Radio Group, an upstart radio broadcaster based in Winter Park, from JVC Broadcasting. The "WOW 100.9" branding was replaced with "Classic Hits 100.9". On March 12, 2024, the station rebranded as "100.9 The Beach" (sharing the "Beach" branding with Satellite Beach sister station WSBH), while retaining its classic hits format.
