= WDVH =

WDVH refers to the following broadcasting stations in the United States:

- WDVH (AM), a radio station (980 AM) licensed to Gainesville, Florida
- WDVH-FM, a radio station (101.7 FM) licensed to Trenton, Florida
- WAJD, a radio station (1390 AM) licensed to Gainesville, Florida, which held the call sign WDVH from 1986 to 1987
- WLDW, a radio station (105.5 FM) licensed to Salisbury, Maryland, which held the call sign WDVH from 1989 to 1991
