= WITC =

WITC may refer to:

- WITC (FM), a defunct radio station located in Cazenovia, New York
- WITC, ICAO code for Cut Nyak Dhien Airport in Meulaboh, Aceh
- A Weekend in the City, a Bloc Party album
- Wisconsin Indianhead Technical College
