= KJCB =

KJCB may refer to:

- KJCB (FM), a radio station (88.9 FM) licensed to serve Lockwood, Montana, United States
- KJCB (AM), a defunct radio station (770 AM) formerly licensed to serve Lafayette, Louisiana, United States
