= Kjeld Tolstrup =

Danish DJ (1965– 2011)

Kjeld Tolstrup (27 June 1965 – 21 March 2011) was a Danish radio DJ.

== Career ==
Kjeld Tolstrup became one of the biggest names in Danish DJ circles in the 1980s performing at The Hacienda in Manchester, Ministry of Sound in London, Sensation event in Copenhagen, and a big number of clubs. Kjeld Tolstrup also remixed for many artists including C.V. Jørgensen, Love Shop, Cut 'N' Move and Infernal.

== Death ==
Kjeld Tolstrup died on 21 March 2011, at the age of 45, after a prolonged illness and hospitalization. In 2000 he had been hospitalized for three weeks because of a congenital heart defect.
