= Radio Sapientia 95.3FM Onitsha =

Radio station in Onitsha, Anambra, Nigeria

- Onitsha; Nigeria
- Frequency: 95.3 MHz

Programming
- Languages: English, Nigerian Pidgin, Igbo

Ownership
- Owner: Sapientia International Media Centre; (Nigerian Broadcasting Commission)

History
- First air date: December 8, 2011

Links
- Webcast: sapientiaonitsha.com
- Website: sapientiaonitsha.com

Radio Sapientia 95.3FM Onitsha is a private commercial radio station founded on December 8, 2011, by Sapientia International Media Centre. It is situated in Onitsha, Anambra State and licensed by the Nigerian Broadcasting Commission.

Radio Sapientia covers about 18 states in its media services. These include the south-south and the core north. The station has started web broadcasting that streams live globally. Every year, Radio Sapientia celebrates its anniversary, drawing crowd from all over the country with different entertainment groups and personalities. It has also added a TV channel in its broadcast.

== Presenters ==
- Uju Nwankwo
- Chinonso Ahec-3 Ekuma
- Joe Igbo
- Cynthia Nwosa
- Oma Chukwuemeka
- Ogo Dike
- Mac Davis
- Jude Geoman
- Jovia Uchenna
- JJ Agada Aguzie
- Ifeanyi Orakwue
- Freshmann Jay Nwanze

== Awards and nominations ==
Year	Event	Prize	Result	Ref
2015	Nigerian Broadcasters Merit Awards	Best Radio Station (South-East)	Won	
2014	Nigerian Broadcasters Merit Awards	Radio Station of the Year (South-East)	Nominated	
