= Charles McPhee =

Charles McPhee

Charles Lambert McPhee (April 24, 1962 – May 8, 2011) was a researcher, author, and nationally syndicated talk radio host. On his call-in program, "The Dream Doctor Show", which began in 2000, he interpreted dreams for people. He was a nephew of best-selling author John McPhee.

== Life and career ==
McPhee had worked in the dream and sleep disorder fields for over 25 years. He spent his career studying dreams and sleep patterns. He graduated from Princeton University in 1985. He also held a master's degree in communication management from the University of Southern California (1990). He received his board certification to perform polysomnographic testing for the diagnosis and treatment of sleep disorders in 1992. His dream interpretations and other writings have appeared on the AOL homepage, the Ladies Room and Predictions section of supanet.com, the UK's leading online source for news and information services, and Trader Magazine.

Known as the Dream Doctor, he was the author of three books, an online column, and a magazine column. He hosted the nationally syndicated Dream Doctor Radio Show from 2000 to 2006. His books included Stop Sleeping Through Your Dreams: A Guide to Awakening Consciousness During Dream Sleep (Henry Holt and Co., NY, 1996) and Ask the Dream Doctor: An A to Z Guide to Deciphering the Hidden Symbols of Your Dreams, (Random House, NY, 2002). He also had two daughters, Celia and Ella McPhee.

McPhee had been the Director of the Sleep Apnea Patient Treatment Program at the Sleep Disorders Center of Santa Barbara, California. He had also worked as a coordinator of the Sleep Disorders Center at Cedars-Sinai Medical Center in Los Angeles, California, and sleep research laboratory at the National Institute of Mental Health in Bethesda, Maryland.

McPhee died at the age of forty nine, about five years after being diagnosed with amyotrophic lateral sclerosis.

McPhee has been cited in numerous newspaper and magazine articles about dreams and dream interpretation, including The New York Times and The Wall Street Journal. In addition to appearing as a dream expert on CNN, he was the host of the popular Dream Doctor Radio Show, heard weeknights for six years across the country, during which he interpreted thousands of dreams.

== Publications ==
- Stop Sleeping Through Your Dreams: A Guide to Awakening Consciousness During Dream Sleep (Random House, New York, NY: 2002)
- Ask the Dream Doctor: An A to Z Guide to Deciphering the Hidden Symbols of Your Dreams (Henry Holt and Co., New York, NY: 1996)
- The Dream Doctor Dream Diary (Springhill Syndication LLC, Encino, CA: 2004)

== Radio show ==
McPhee hosted the popular Dream Doctor Radio Show for six years. The show started on KRUZ-FM (HOT AC) in Santa Barbara, California, in 2000. In two years, the show became the #1 show in the market for its time slot for adults aged 25–54. In October 2002, Cox Radio signed McPhee and moved the show to Atlanta. The show, featuring adult contemporary (AC) music and four dream interpretations per hour, was expanded to five hours every weeknight. Emanating from flagship WSB-FM (Soft AC), the show was picked up by FM AC music stations in major markets, including Miami, Denver, Minneapolis, Salt Lake City, San Antonio, and Tampa. Cox made was among the first syndicators to provide a customizable FTP version of the show for stations that wanted to play their own music and format the show with more dream interpretations.

The radio stations that ran more dream interpretations did markedly better than those that did not. The show did well, but audience research revealed that there was a problem with the show. The audience far preferred listening to McPhee and his dream interpretations than to the music. In 2004, McPhee's manager, George Oliva, started a radio syndication company, Springhill Syndication, to distribute a version of the show without music. He moved McPhee back to California and launched the new three-hour talk show on November 11, 2004. The program was picked up by newstalk, talk, and even music stations in markets that included Houston, Minneapolis, Salt Lake City, Las Vegas, West Palm Beach, Monterrey, and Hartford. A one-minute feature devoted to the meaning of the most common dream symbols played in a number of markets, including New York and Los Angeles. A weekend show expanded the reach of the Dream Doctor to markets that included San Francisco and Hartford.

In March 2006, McPhee became aware of problems with his voice. After a number of tests, he was diagnosed with probable amyotrophic lateral sclerosis (ALS) (Lou Gehrig's disease) in June 2006. After the diagnosis was confirmed in August 2006, McPhee announced the news to his audience that he had Bulbar ALS, a severe form of the disease. The final Dream Doctor Radio Show was broadcast on October 20, 2006.

== Web site ==
McPhee launched www.dreamdoctor.com in 1997. It was among the first sites on the Internet devoted entirely to providing credible information about dreams and sleep. Through it, he had amassed the largest database of dreams in the world. With it, he broke their code. Taking a scientific approach to dream interpretation and understanding, he used the database to arrive at his findings about dreams, all of which are evidenced in his writings, radio show, and web site. He concluded that everyone dreams in the same language of dream symbols, regardless of age, gender, geography, culture, religion, or native language. As all languages evolve and are influenced by contextual realities ranging from personal experience to regionalisms, so, contended McPhee, does the language of dreams. He added that what makes every dream unique and specific to the dreamer is the waking life background that generated the dream.

Due to his illness and its increasingly severe physical limitations, McPhee focused his professional efforts on his web site. In August 2009, the site was upgraded. In addition to thousands of free pages of information about dreams and sleep, it now gives users access to audio and video clips of McPhee as well as a unique dream interpretation tool called the Dream Wizard.

== Awards and reviews ==
- Internet Top Ten Site (June 19, 1998)
- "What's New ... On the Web" Yahoo pick of the Day (June 4, 1998)
- Cool Stuff on the Net Award (June 14, 1998)
- Eye on the Web's Daily Top Site (June 19, 1998)
- Dummies Daily, Web after Five (June 29, 1998)
- ZDTV Internet Tonight (October 8, 1998)
