= Papa Joe Chevalier =

American sports radio host

Armand "Papa Joe" Chevalier (September 12, 1948 – June 3, 2011) was a sports radio and talk radio host from Las Vegas, Nevada. His show, "The Papa Joe Show," was heard on Sporting News Radio until 2005. Papa Joe had brief stints in independent syndication, on Lifestyle Talk Radio Network, and Sports Byline USA, and the now-defunct Sports Fan Radio Network. Papa Joe's program aired from the studios of KNUU 970 AM in Las Vegas.

He was known for "Bite Me Wednesday," in which he would encourage fans to call in and air grievances

Chevalier died June 3, 2011, age 62, several months after he had suffered a stroke that paralyzed his right side.
