= KNLE-FM =

Radio station in Texas, United States

- Round Rock, Texas; United States
- Broadcast area: Austin-Round Rock, Texas
- Frequency: 88.1 MHz
- Branding: Candle 88

Programming
- Format: Religious; Christian Music/Christian Talk

Ownership
- Owner: Ixoye Productions, Inc.

History
- First air date: August 6, 1981
- Former call signs: KHCS-FM (1981–1987)
- Call sign meaning: K(C)aNdLE

Technical information
- Licensing authority: FCC
- Facility ID: 29293
- Class: A
- ERP: 3,000 watts
- HAAT: 71.0 meters
- Transmitter coordinates: 30°26′58.00″N 97°39′44.00″W

Links
- Public license information: Public file; LMS
- Website: http://www.knle.org/

KNLE-FM (88.1 FM) is a radio station broadcasting a Christian preaching/Christian talk format. Licensed to Round Rock, Texas, United States, the station serves the Austin area. The station is currently owned by Ixoye Productions, Inc. and is a listener supported station.

== History ==
The station went on the air as KHCS-FM on 1981-08-06. on 1987-01-07, the station changed its call sign to the current KNLE.

It once broadcast contemporary Christian music, but from at least 2011 onwards KNLE has broadcast independent Christian music submitted by its listeners and supporters. However, about 10 years later it underwent a programming change, broadcasting various sermons now.
