= KJCB (AM) =

Lafayette, Louisiana; United States
- Frequency: 770 kHz

Programming
- Format: Defunct

Ownership
- Owner: R & M Broadcasting

History
- First air date: 1981
- Last air date: April 4, 2011

Technical information
- Facility ID: 54341
- Class: B
- Power: 1,000 watts day 500 watts night
- Transmitter coordinates: 30°18′01″N 91°59′28″W

KJCB (770 AM, The Voice of the South) was a radio station broadcasting an Urban Contemporary music format from 1981 to 2011. Licensed to Lafayette, Louisiana, United States, the station was owned by R & M Broadcasting.

== History ==
The station was assigned the call letters KJCB on December 14, 1981. On April 4, 2011, KJCB was forced off the air after it lost its transmitter lease. The station's license was cancelled on January 23, 2020, after its licensee failed to respond to an inquiry from the FCC as to whether the station was operating.
