= WITC (FM) =

Radio station in Cazenovia, New York

Cazenovia, New York; United States
- Frequency: 88.9 MHz

Programming
- Format: Defunct

Ownership
- Owner: Cazenovia College

History
- First air date: April 10, 1978
- Last air date: February 9, 2022
- Former frequencies: 90.9 MHz (1978–1987)

Technical information
- Licensing authority: FCC
- Facility ID: 9430
- Class: A
- ERP: 130 watts
- HAAT: 10.0 meters (32.8 ft)
- Transmitter coordinates: 42°55′53.00″N 75°51′15.00″W

Links
- Public license information: Public file; LMS

WITC (88.9 FM) was a radio station broadcasting a variety format. Licensed to Cazenovia, New York, United States, the station was owned by Cazenovia College.

== History ==
WITC was licensed April 10, 1978. It was a 10-watt station at 90.9 MHz. The station moved to 88.9 in 1987. Its license was cancelled on February 9, 2022.
