= WDVH-FM =

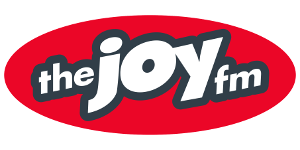
- Trenton, Florida; United States
- Broadcast area: Gainesville, Florida
- Frequency: 101.7 MHz
- Branding: The Joy FM

Programming
- Format: Contemporary Christian

Ownership
- Owner: Radio Training Network

History
- First air date: March 25, 1987
- Former call signs: WCWB (1987–1994); WDJY (1994–2004); WDVH-FM (2004–2011); WPLL-FM (2011–2012)

Technical information
- Licensing authority: FCC
- Facility ID: 21797
- Class: A
- ERP: 3,000 watts
- HAAT: 143 meters (469 ft)
- Transmitter coordinates: 29°36′31.73″N 82°50′58.0416″W

Links
- Public license information: Public file; LMS
- Webcast: Listen live
- Website: www.thejoyfm.com

WDVH-FM (101.7 FM), is a non-commercial Christian radio station licensed to Trenton, Florida and broadcasting to the Gainesville-Ocala, Florida radio market. It is owned by the Radio Training Network and airs a Contemporary Christian radio format known as The Joy FM. The Radio Training Network owns about a dozen FM stations and translators in Florida as part of "The Joy FM" network originating from WJIS in Bradenton. While WDVH-FM is a licensed as a commercial station, The Joy FM Network operates as a non-commercial organization, asking for donations during on-air fundraisers.

== History ==
The 101.7 frequency in Trenton was added to the FCC's table of allotments in 1985. On March 25, 1987, the station first signed on the air as WCWB from a tower site approximately two miles west of Trenton. It broadcast an automated country music format from a single wide mobile home next to the transmitting tower. In April 1994, the call sign was changed to WDJY.

In late 2000, the station ownership changed from Pinnacle AM Broadcasting, Inc to Pamal Broadcasting along with sister station AM 980 WLUS. In February 2004, WLUS's call letters were changed back to WDVH, at the same time, WDJY's call letters changed to WDVH-FM. This began the simulcast of the "Country Legends" classic country format from the WDVH studios on SE 27th Street in Gainesville. In October 2005, the studios were moved into the Sunshine Broadcasting building, located on 100 NW 76th Street in the Tower Hill Office Park, Gainesville. On November 1, 2011, the station switched from a classic country format to Contemporary Christian, branded as "Pulse 101.7" under new call letters, WPLL-FM. On September 20, 2012, Pulse 101.7 moved up to 106.9 WKZY, along with its Contemporary Christian format. The station's call sign was changed back to WDVH-FM on October 24, 2012. On April 15, 2013, WDVH-FM split from its simulcast with WPLL and changed its format to classic country, branded as "101.7 Hank FM". On May 1, 2016, sister station WDVH 980 AM flipped its format from talk radio to a simulcast of WDVH-FM. On September 6, 2016, WDVH-FM added a simulcast of country music on translator station 94.1 FM W241DH; the station and the translator were rebranded as "I Am Country 94.1/101.7".

On August 17, 2017, the classic country format moved to 106.9 WPLL as 101.7 WDVH-FM became an affiliate of The Joy FM Network. The station was sold by MARC Radio Gainesville, LLC, to the parent company of The Joy FM, the Radio Training Network. Following WDVH-FM's sale, AM 980 WDVH and translator station 94.1 W241DH began simulcasting WPLL, after the country format and "I am Country" branding moved to WPLL; WDVH AM / W241DH has since split from WPLL to broadcast an Urban Oldies format as "R&B 94.1".
