= WTMN =

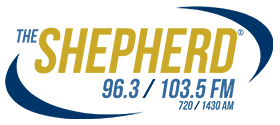
- Gainesville, Florida; United States
- Broadcast area: Gainesville-Ocala
- Frequency: 1430 kHz
- Branding: The Shepherd Radio

Programming
- Format: Christian radio
- Affiliations: SMN News

Ownership
- Owner: MARC Radio Gainesville, LLC
- Sister stations: WDVH, WHHZ, WPLL, WRZN, WTMG, WXJZ

History
- First air date: January 1990
- Former call signs: WWLO
- Call sign meaning: "Team" for previous sports format

Technical information
- Licensing authority: FCC
- Facility ID: 23022
- Class: D
- Power: 10,000 watts (day); 45 watts (night)
- Transmitter coordinates: 29°37′27.33″N 82°17′17.7468″W
- Translator: 96.3 W242CS (Gainesville)

Links
- Public license information: Public file; LMS
- Webcast: Listen live
- Website: theshepherdradio.com

WTMN (1430 AM) is a commercial radio station licensed to Gainesville, Florida, United States. It is owned by MARC Radio Gainesville, LLC, and broadcasts to the Gainesville-Ocala radio market. WTMN and sister station WRZN 720 AM in Hernando, simulcast a Christian format called "The Shepherd Radio."

Programming is also heard on FM translator W242CS at 96.3 MHz in Gainesville.

== History ==
WTMN signed on the air in January 1990. Its original call sign was WWLO. It was a daytimer with 2,500 watts power, and required to be off the air at night. It was diplexed on the WLUS tower (now WDVH) on SE 27th Street in Gainesville. The station initially broadcast an urban contemporary format. That format was moved to sister station 101.3 WTMG in 1993.

After that, several attempts were made to launch a sports radio format. But they were not successful because the dominant Gainesville team, the University of Florida Gators, are heard on AM 850 WRUF, the school's commercial radio station.

WTMN switched to urban gospel music in 2001, and later switched to a Christian talk and teaching format.

In 2003 the station upgraded its daytime power to 10,000 watts and in 2004 the station added 45 watts of night time power.
