= WHHZ =

- Newberry, Florida; United States
- Broadcast area: Gainesville
- Frequency: 100.5 MHz
- Branding: Rock It 100.5

Programming
- Format: Active rock
- Affiliations: Compass Media Networks

Ownership
- Owner: MARC Radio Group; (MARC Radio Gainesville, LLC)
- Sister stations: WDVH, WPLL, WRZN, WTMG, WTMN, WXJZ

History
- First air date: November 18, 1994
- Former call signs: WNFQ (1990–1998); WBXY (1998–1999); WRKG (1999–2001)

Technical information
- Licensing authority: FCC
- Facility ID: 48703
- Class: C2
- ERP: 44,000 watts
- HAAT: 143 meters (469 ft)
- Transmitter coordinates: 29°36′31.73″N 82°50′58.0416″W

Links
- Public license information: Public file; LMS
- Webcast: Listen live
- Website: rockit1005.com

WHHZ (100.5 FM), branded as "Rock It 100.5", is a commercial radio station licensed to Newberry, Florida, broadcasting to the Gainesville area. The station is owned by the MARC Radio Group and transmits with an Effective radiated power of 44 kw from a tower site 2 miles west of Trenton.

== History ==
The FCC added 100.5 MHz class A allocation for Newberry to the table of allotments on December 17, 1986. Newberry Broadcasting Corporation applied for and was granted the construction permit on January 10, 1990. During the construction phase, the allotment was upgraded to a class C3. The station first signed on the air on November 18, 1994. Originally, as a class C3 FM station broadcasting from a tower site west of High Springs, Florida, it never had good penetration into its primary target market of Gainesville.

After several call letter changes and format changes; WBXY in 1998, WRGK in 1999, it was sold to Asterisk Communications who then sold the station to Pamal Broadcasting. The sale was consummated in February 2001. Pamal immediately co-located the station with its other market stations in the WLUS building on SE 27th Street. The format was changed briefly to CHR before finally settling on Alternative Rock after stunting with the opening riffs of We Will Rock You by Queen. When University Of Gainesville-owned WRUF-FM changed formats in 2010 from Active Rock "Rock 104" to Country (as "103.7 The Gator"), WHHZ adopted an Active Rock format. On April 17, 2014 WHHZ transitioned back to an Alternative Rock format.

In July 2004, the transmitter was relocated to sister station WKZY's tower and the signal was upgraded to a class C2 FM allocation. This greatly improved coverage of the Gainesville city metro. Unfortunately, the improved signal never translated to higher ratings or higher revenue for the station. In October 2005 the studios were moved across town to the Sunshine Broadcasting building on 100 NW 76th drive in the Tower Hill Office Park along with Pamal's other Gainesville stations. In July 2011, WHHZ and all of its sister stations were sold by Pamal Broadcasting to the MARC Radio Group, an upstart radio broadcaster based in Winter Park.

On September 3, 2024, the station rebranded as "Rock It 100.5" with an Active Rock Format.
