= WPLL =

- Cross City, Florida; United States
- Broadcast area: Gainesville, Florida
- Frequency: 106.9 MHz
- Branding: I Am Country 106.9

Programming
- Format: Classic Country

Ownership
- Owner: MARC Radio Gainesville, LLC
- Sister stations: WDVH, WHHZ, WRZN, WTMG, WTMN

History
- First air date: November 16, 1987 (as 106.3 WDFL-FM)
- Former call signs: WDFL-FM (1987–1998); WKZY (1998–2012)
- Former frequencies: 106.3 MHz (1987–1998)

Technical information
- Licensing authority: FCC
- Facility ID: 73409
- Class: C1
- ERP: 100,000 watts
- HAAT: 143 meters (469 ft)
- Transmitter coordinates: 29°36′31.73″N 82°50′58.0416″W

Links
- Public license information: Public file; LMS
- Webcast: Listen Live
- Website: IAmCountryRadio.com

WPLL (106.9 MHz) is a commercial FM radio station licensed to Cross City, Florida, and broadcasting to the Gainesville area. The station is owned by MARC Radio Gainesville and airs a classic country radio format. WPLL uses the slogan "I Am Country 106.9."

The studios and offices are on NW 76th Drive in Gainesville. The transmitter is on SW 25th Avenue in Trenton.

== History ==
=== 106.3 WDFL-FM ===
On November 16, 1987, the station signed on as WDFL-FM, simulcasting the country format of sister station AM 1240 WDFL (now WZCC). It broadcast from the WDFL tower in Cross City, owned by Women in Florida Broadcasting, Inc. WDFL-FM was a Class A FM station with 3,000 watts of power carrying a satellite-fed country music format on 106.3 MHz.

=== Move to 106.9 ===
In 1998, Women in Florida Broadcasting received approval from the Federal Communications Commission to upgrade the signal to a C1, with 4,500 watts, and move it to its current transmitter site, about two miles west of Trenton, Florida. The signal upgrade required WDFL-FM to change its frequency to 106.9 MHz to avoid conflicts with WGUL-FM 106.3 in Beverly Hills, Florida (now WGHR in Spring Hill, Florida).

In 2000, WDFL-FM became WKZY ("Cozy") and its format changed to Adult Standards, fed via satellite from Westwood One's America's Best Music Network (then known as "AM Only").

=== Sale to Pamal Broadcasting ===
WKZY was sold to Pamal Broadcasting in late 2000, and in April 2001 launched a Soft Adult Contemporary format as "Lite Rock, 106.9 KZY." This format never did well, mostly because it was going up against heritage AC station 98.5 WKTK which has a better signal over the Gainesville-Ocala market. Pamal moved the studios from a single wide mobile home at the Trenton transmitter site to the studios of WLUS (now WDVH) on the east side of Gainesville. From that location, the station consistently had trouble delivering a reliable program feed to the transmitter site.

In 2003, Pamal changed format to Adult Hits as "106.9 KZY." In October 2005, WKZY along with Pamal's other Gainesville stations moved to a new studio facility in the Sunshine Broadcasting Building, located at 100 NW 76 Drive, in the Tower Hill Office Park. In order to comply with FCC 73.1225(a) (main studio rule), the station maintained its main studio at the Trenton transmitter site.

In 2007, the station was sold to Johnson Licenses, Inc. In December 2007, 106.9 KZY transitioned to Hot Adult Contemporary and later to an Adult Top 40 sound with a rhythmic lean. In 2009, the station changed its format from Adult Top 40 back to a Hot AC. WKZY also changed its slogan from "More Hit Music... Better Mix" to "The Best Mix of the 80's, 90's and today." The station also aired The Kidd Kraddick Morning Show syndicated from Dallas.

=== Contemporary Christian ===
On September 20, 2012, WKZY announced a switch to Contemporary Christian Music as 106.9 The Pulse. The Kidd Kraddick Morning Show was discontinued. On November 8, 2012, the station changed its call sign to the current WPLL.

On August 9, 2017, WPLL announced it would end its Contemporary Christian format. The last day of operations was Sunday, August 12. WDVH-FM 101.7 picked up the Christian Contemporary format as "The Joy FM," fed by WJIS in the Tampa area.

On August 14, 2017, WPLL switched to a Classic Country format previously heard on WDVH-FM.

== Previous logos ==
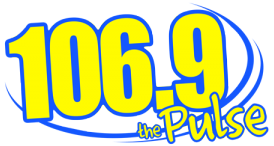
