= WRZN =

Radio station in Hernando–Gainesville, Florida

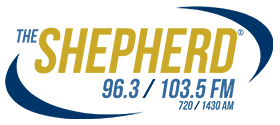
- Hernando, Florida; United States
- Broadcast area: Gainesville-Ocala
- Frequency: 720 kHz
- Branding: The Shepherd

Programming
- Format: Christian radio
- Affiliations: SMN News

Ownership
- Owner: MARC Radio Gainesville, LLC
- Sister stations: WDVH, WHHZ, WPLL, WTMG, WTMN

History
- First air date: June 1989

Technical information
- Licensing authority: FCC
- Facility ID: 39769
- Class: B
- Power: 10,000 watts (day); 250 watts (night)
- Transmitter coordinates: 28°55′21.72″N 82°22′20.31″W
- Translator: 103.5 W278CI (Oxford)

Links
- Public license information: Public file; LMS
- Webcast: Listen live
- Website: theshepherdradio.com

WRZN (720 AM) is a commercial radio station licensed to Hernando, Florida, United States, serving the Gainesville and Ocala markets. Owned by MARC Radio Gainesville, LLC, it carries a Christian radio format, with studios and transmitter sited on North Roscoe Road, just north of Hernando. WRZN simulcasts its with co-owned WTMN (1430 AM) in Gainesville, using the moniker "The Shepherd."

WRZN is also relayed over low-power FM translator W278CI at 103.5 MHz in Oxford.

== History ==
WRZN signed on the air in June 1989. It played oldies and was owned by Management and Marketing Synergy Inc, whose principals were Frank Watson and Clay Brinker. Andrew Blackburn was the original Operations Manager. The station carried the "Gold"" format from the Satellite Music Network.

In 2000, the station was sold to Pamal Broadcasting as a part of a multi-station market purchase in the Gainesville-Ocala market.

In 2009, WRZN was an affiliate of America's Best Music.

WRZN was purchased by Marc Radio in 2011. In early November 2011, WRZN became "Fox News Talk 720" airing a talk radio format. That lasted five years.

In 2016, it switched to a Christian talk and teaching format. It began carrying programs from national religious leaders.

WRZN's logo under its previous news-talk format
