= WDVH (AM) =

Radio station in Gainesville, Florida

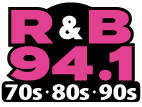
- Gainesville, Florida; United States
- Broadcast area: Gainesville-Ocala
- Frequency: 980 kHz
- Branding: R&B 94.1

Programming
- Format: Urban oldies

Ownership
- Owner: MARC Radio Gainesville, LLC
- Sister stations: WHHZ, WPLL, WRZN, WTMG, WTMN, WXJZ

History
- First air date: October 1954
- Former call signs: WDVH (1955–1986); WLUS (1986–2004)
- Call sign meaning: Founding owners Toby Dowdy, Rob Vaughn and Tom Hanson

Technical information
- Licensing authority: FCC
- Facility ID: 18047
- Class: D
- Power: 5,000 watts (day); 166 watts (night)
- Transmitter coordinates: 29°37′27.33″N 82°17′17.7468″W
- Translator: 94.1 W231DH (Gainesville)
- Repeater: 100.9 WXJZ-HD2 (Gainesville)

Links
- Public license information: Public file; LMS
- Webcast: Listen live
- Website: rnb941.com

WDVH (980 AM) is a commercial radio station licensed to Gainesville, Florida, United States. It airs an urban oldies format, and it is owned by MARC Radio. WDVH is also heard over low-power FM translator W231DH at 94.1 MHz in Gainesville; the translator's dial position is used in WDVH's moniker, "R&B 94.1".

== History ==
=== Early years ===
WDVH signed on the air on in October 1954. It broadcast from its current transmitter location on SE 27th Street (formerly known as Kincaid Road). The call sign stands for the three partners who launched the station, Toby Dowdy, Rob Vaughn and Tom Hanssen. Toby Dowdy was a country music musician, Rob Vaughn owned the land and Tom Hanssen was a radio station manager. Initially WDVH was a daytime-only station, required to go off the air at sunset.

In the mid-1950s, it added a second tower to give it night time service. Around 1968, both towers collapsed in a storm and only one tower was replaced, making it a non-directional daytime station again.

WDVH was sold in 1969 to Roy Danner (of Shoney's restaurant fame) and Larry Edwards. On May 1, 1970, the format changed to country music.

On June 30, 1980, the studio building burned down due to an electrical fire. Temporary studios were installed next to the transmitting tower in a double wide trailer while a new permanent studio building was built in place of the old one.

In April 1988, WWLO (1430 AM, now WTMN) was diplexed onto the WDVH tower. WWLO first went on the air with 2.5 kW daytime only. That station increased its power to 10 kW daytime, 45 watts nighttime in July 2003.

=== Adult Standards and Classic Country ===
WDVH was sold again, this time to Bill Morris, who in turn sold it to Crystal which became Pinnacle AM Broadcasting, Inc. The format changed to Adult Standards and the call letters were changed to WLUS in 1996 (US98). In 2000, the transmitter and computer automation equipment was seized by the Alachua County Sheriff's department for failure to pay unrelated business debts. This equipment was bought at auction by morning show host, Jim Brand with the hopes that it could be re-installed, quickly returning the station to the air.

When station ownership had more financial problems, the transmitter was sold to a Christian radio broadcaster based in St. Louis, Missouri. The station remained dark for nearly eight months while a sale was arranged to Pamal Broadcasting. This sale was consummated in late 2000 after Pinnacle installed a new transmitter.

When Pamal Broadcasting took over, it combined the studios of WKZY and WHHZ in the WDVH studio building. WDVH's format remained Adult Standards until 2004, when it was changed to Classic Country. It was simulcast with co-owned 101.7 WDVH-FM under the slogan "WDVH Country legends, 101.7 FM and 980 AM".

In 2005 the studios were moved across town to the Sunshine Broadcasting building on 100 NW 76th Drive (Tower Hill office park) along with WTMN, WTMG, WKZY, WHHZ and WDVH-FM. For the next six years, WDVH continued with Classic Country and "Tradio" shows on weekends.

=== Talk and Urban Oldies ===
In late October 2011, WDVH became "Florida's Fox News Radio 980 & 720" changing format to talk radio with Fox News Radio updates.

On May 1, 2016, WDVH changed its format back to a simulcast of classic country-formatted WDVH-FM. On September 6, 2016, WDVH rebranded as "I am Country 94.1 & 101.7".

On August 14, 2017, WDVH rebranded as "I am Country 106.9", after the format and "I am Country" branding relocated on FM to WPLL. (WDVH-FM was sold at that time to the Radio Training Network, becoming a simulcast of Bradenton station WJIS.)

On October 16, 2019, WDVH/W231DH split from its FM sister and flipped to urban oldies as R&B 94.1, with an emphasis on R&B and hip-hop hits from the 1970s, 1980s, and 1990s.

In October 2024, after sister station 101.3 WTMG was taken off the air by Hurricane Helene, its urban contemporary format and programming as Magic 101.3 was moved to W231DH/WXJZ-HD2 as an interim measure, bumping the existing R&B 94.1 format exclusively to the AM and internet radio.
