= WTMG =

- Williston, Florida; United States
- Broadcast area: Gainesville-Ocala
- Frequency: 101.3 MHz
- Branding: Magic 101.3

Programming
- Format: Rhythmic contemporary

Ownership
- Owner: MARC Radio Gainesville, LLC
- Sister stations: WDVH, WHHZ, WPLL, WRZN, WTMN

History
- First air date: 1983
- Former call signs: WJRQ (1983–1986); WLLO (1986–1987); WFEZ (1987–1996)
- Former frequencies: 92.1 MHz (1983–1996)
- Call sign meaning: We're The Magic of Gainesville

Technical information
- Licensing authority: FCC
- Facility ID: 6268
- Class: A
- ERP: 3,500 watts
- HAAT: 134 meters (440 ft)
- Transmitter coordinates: 29°25′9.21″N 82°32′56.9214″W

Links
- Public license information: Public file; LMS
- Webcast: Listen live
- Website: magic1013.com

WTMG (101.3 FM) is a commercial radio station licensed to Williston, Florida, United States, and serving the Gainesville-Ocala market. It is owned by MARC Radio Gainesville, LLC, with studios on NW 76th Drive in Gainesville. WTMG aired a rhythmic contemporary format until it was silenced when its tower was damaged in September 2024. Its programming was moved to co-owned WDVH.

== History ==
The station signed on the air in 1983. It originally broadcast at 92.1 on the FM dial. The call sign was WJRQ, airing a satellite-fed country music format.

It became WLLO ("Willow 92") in 1986, programming beautiful music, and changed its call letters to WFEZ the following year after a sale. The format flipped back to country music in 1988 due to advertiser difficulty in selling the easy listening format. However, the country format fared no better in ratings or revenue.

Later in 1988, WFEZ transformed into a Rhythmic Contemporary or "Churban" station, playing urban, dance and pop. Ocala-Gainesville radio veteran Tony Downes helped program it, along with station general manager Mark Tillery. "Hot 92.1" was a ratings success and paved the way for a move to mainstream urban which took to the air in the early 1990s. It has played Hip Hop, R&B, Old School and Classic Soul and on Sunday mornings, Urban Gospel. The station adopted the WTMG call sign in 1996 and moved to 101.3 FM.

At first, it was Gainesville's only Urban radio station, targeting the Mainstream Urban and Urban Adult Contemporary audiences alike. By 2009, WTMG began to evolve to a rhythmic Contemporary direction with an emphasis on hit-driven Hip-Hop and R&B. Because of this shift, Nielsen BDS placed the station on the Rhythmic Airplay panel. The station added the nationally syndicated Rickey Smiley Show for morning drive time.

On September 29, 2024, WTMG went off the air when its tower was destroyed. It was hit by high winds from Hurricane Helene. The station's signal has been moved to WDVH 980 AM and W231DH 94.1 FM.
