= Hartford, Connecticut =

Capital city of Connecticut, U.S.

Hartford
- State capital
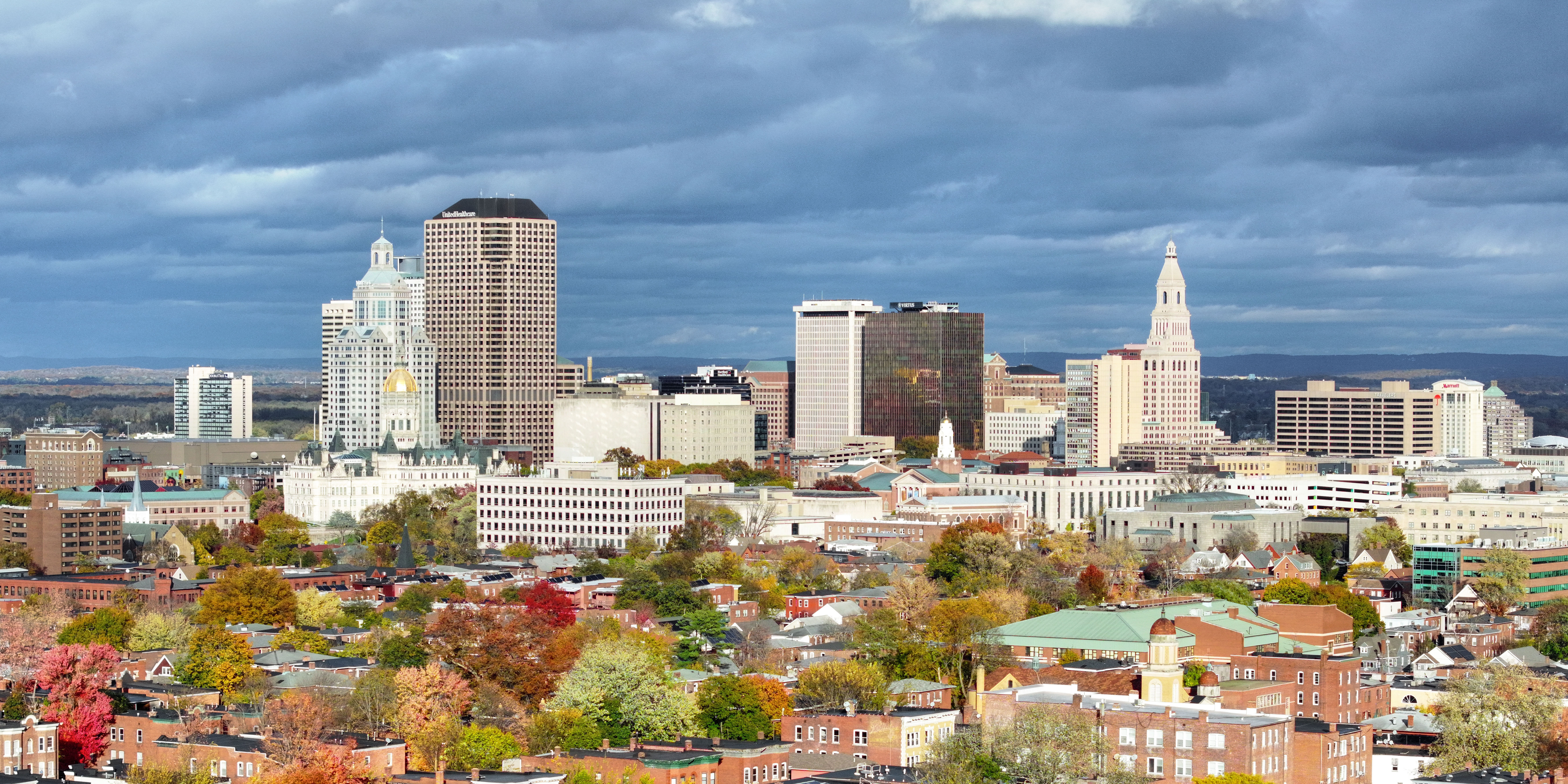
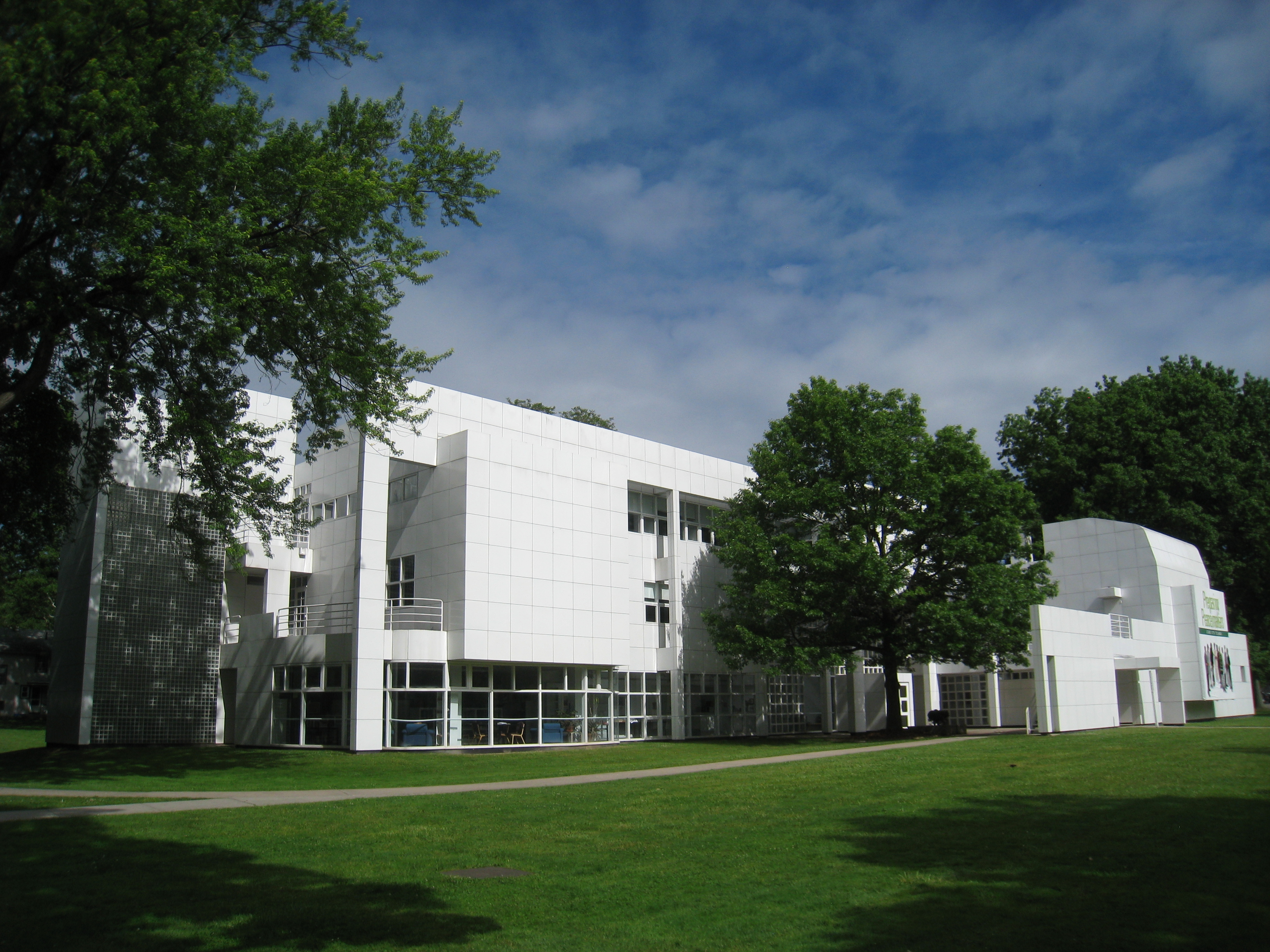
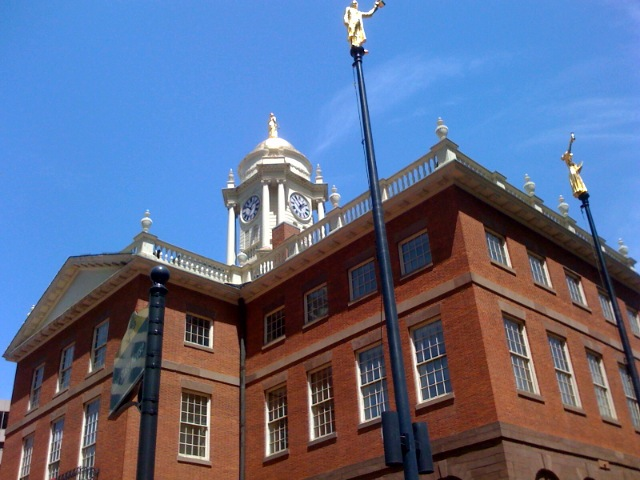
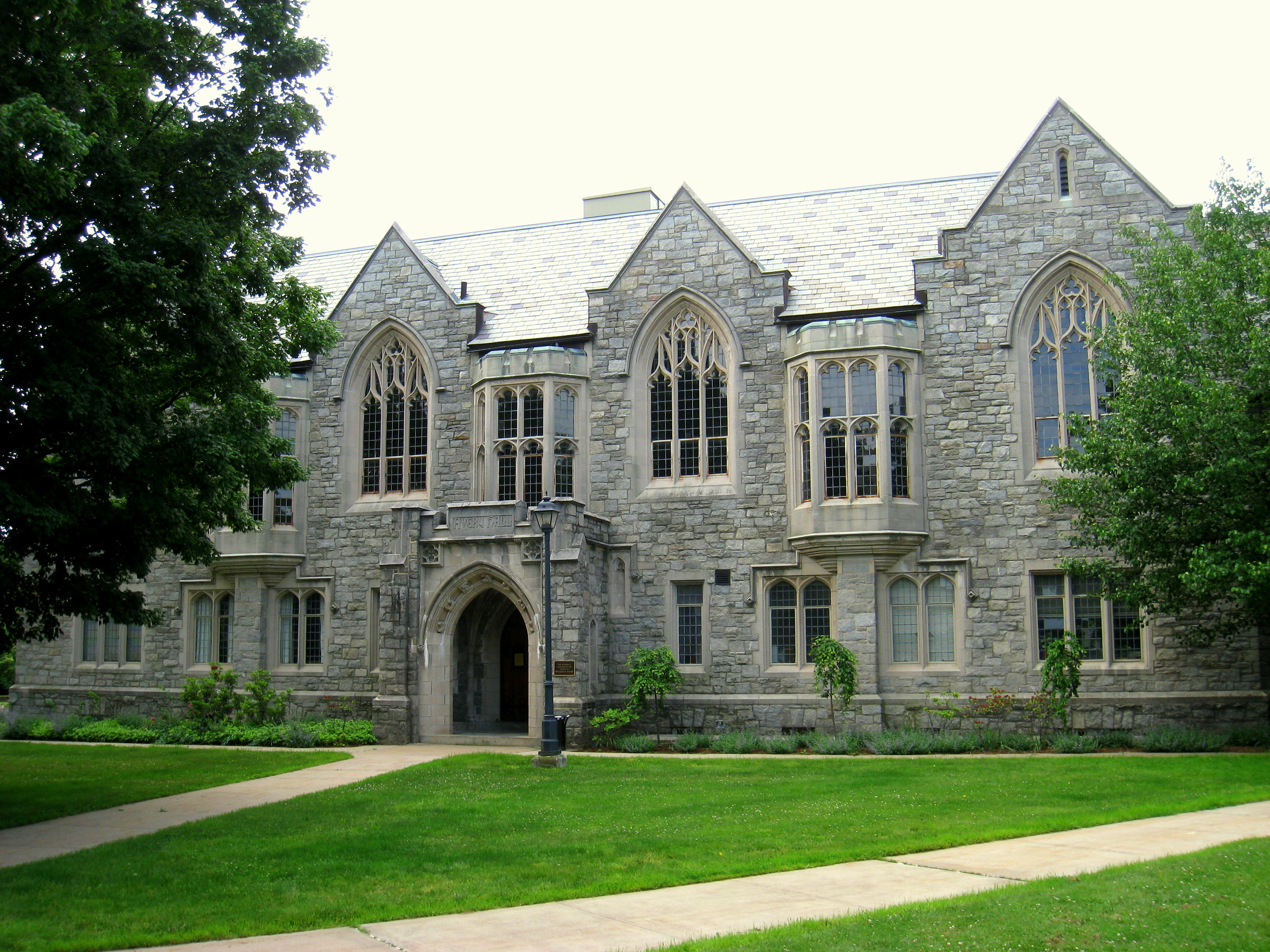
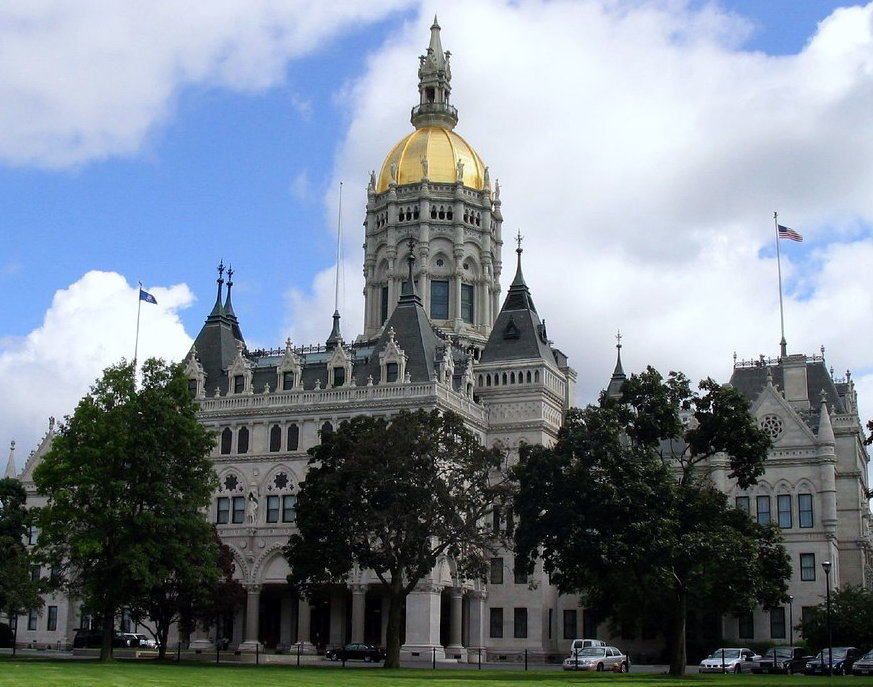
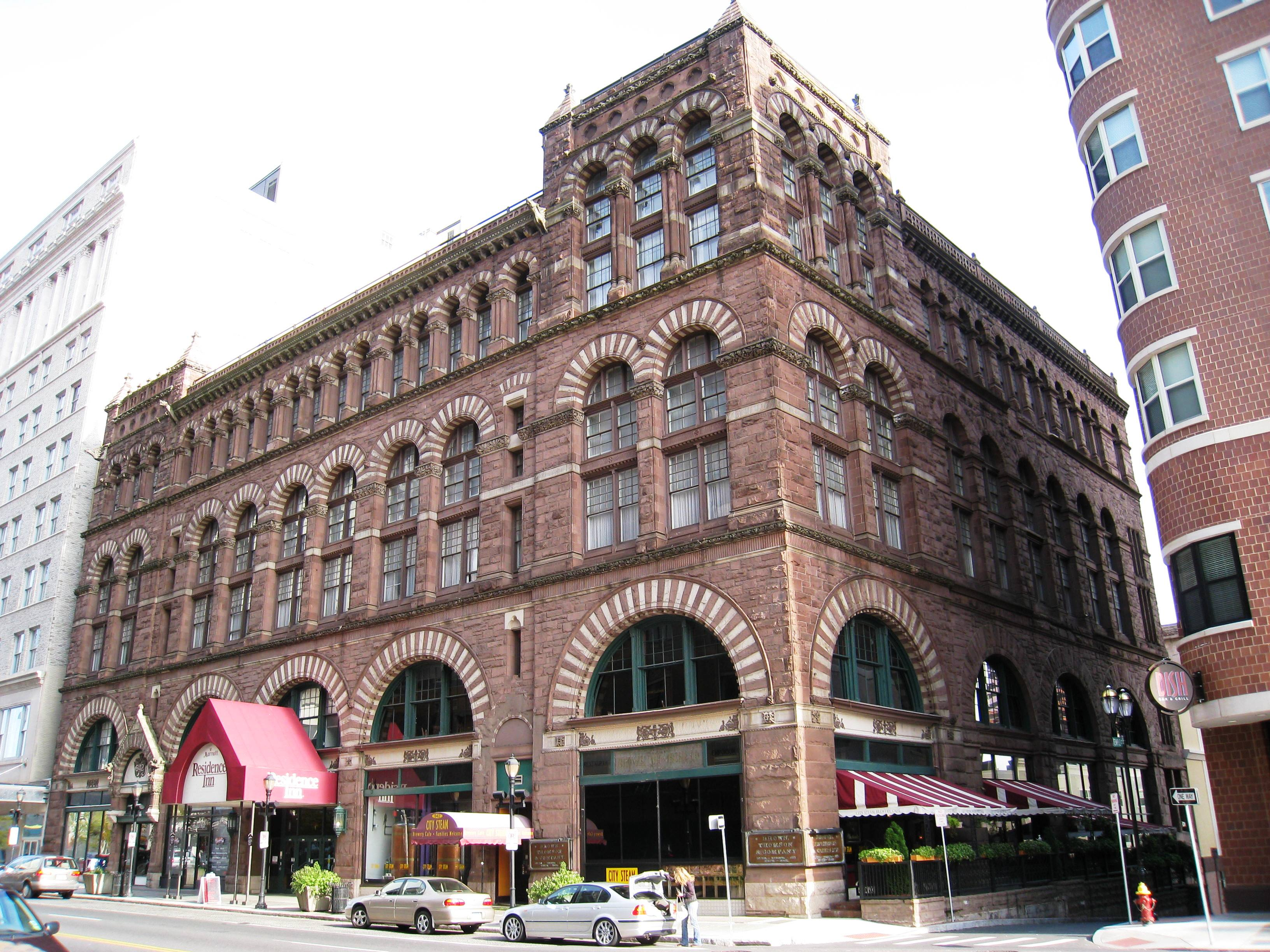
- Downtown Hartford Seminary Old State House UConn Law Connecticut State Capitol Cheney Building

- Flag Seal
- Nicknames: New England's Rising Star; The Insurance Capital of the World; America's Filing Cabinet
- Motto(s): Post Nubila Phoebus (Latin) "After the clouds, the sun"
- Interactive map of Hartford
- Location within Connecticut Location within the United States
- Coordinates: 41°45′45″N 72°40′27″W
- Country: United States
- State: Connecticut
- County: Hartford
- Region: Capitol Region
- MSA: Greater Hartford
- Settled: October 15, 1635
- Named: February 21, 1637
- Incorporated (city): May 29, 1784
- Consolidated: April 1, 1896
- Named for: Hertford, Hertfordshire

Government
  - Type: Mayor-council
  - Mayor: Arunan Arulampalam (D)
  - City Council: Shirley Surgeon; Marilyn Rossetti; Thomas Clarke II; Maly Rosado; Kelly Bilodeau; Amilcar Hernandez; Alex Thomas; Joshua Michtom; John Gale

Area
  - State capital: 18.05 sq mi (46.76 km^{2})
  - Land: 17.38 sq mi (45.01 km^{2})
  - Water: 0.68 sq mi (1.75 km^{2})
  - Urban: 535.9 sq mi (1,388.0 km^{2})
- Elevation: 30 ft (9.1 m)

Population (2020)
  - State capital: 121,054
  - Density: 7,028/sq mi (2,713.4/km^{2})
  - Urban: 977,158 (US: 47th)
  - Urban density: 1,820/sq mi (704/km^{2})
  - Metro: 1,150,473 (US: 51st)
  - CSA: 2,659,617 (US: 26th)
- Demonym: Hartfordite

GDP
  - Hartford (MSA): $114.887 billion (2022)
- Time zone: UTC−05:00 (EST)
  - Summer (DST): UTC−04:00 (EDT)
- ZIP Codes: 061xx
- Area codes: 860/959
- FIPS code: 09-37000
- GNIS feature ID: 2378277
- Primary airport: Bradley International Airport
- Secondary airport: Hartford–Brainard Airport
- Website: hartfordct.gov

Hartford is the capital city of the U.S. state of Connecticut. The city, located in Hartford County, had a population of 121,054 at the 2020 census and was estimated at 124,006 in 2025. Hartford is the most populous city in the Capitol Planning Region and the core city of the Greater Hartford metropolitan area with 1.17 million residents in total.

Founded in 1635, Hartford is among the oldest cities in the United States. It is home to the country's oldest continuously operating public art museum (Wadsworth Atheneum), the second oldest publicly funded park (Bushnell Park), the oldest continuously published newspaper (the Hartford Courant), the second-oldest secondary school (Hartford Public High School), and the oldest school for deaf children (American School for the Deaf), founded by Thomas Hopkins Gallaudet in 1817. It is the location of the Mark Twain House, in which the author Mark Twain wrote his most famous works and raised his family. He wrote in 1868, "Of all the beautiful towns it has been my fortune to see this is the chief."

Hartford alternated with New Haven as dual capitals of Connecticut from 1664, and Hartford has been the sole capital since 1875. Hartford was the richest city in the United States for several decades following the American Civil War. Since 2015, it has been one of the poorest cities in the country, with three out of ten families living below the poverty threshold. In sharp contrast, the Greater Hartford metropolitan statistical area was ranked 32nd of 318 metropolitan areas in total economic production and 8th out of 280 metropolitan statistical areas in per capita income in 2015.

Nicknamed the "Insurance Capital of the World" and "America's filing cabinet", the city holds high sufficiency as a global city, as home to the headquarters of many insurance companies, the region's major industry. Other prominent industries include the services, education and healthcare industries. Hartford coordinates certain Hartford–Springfield regional development matters through the Knowledge Corridor Economic Partnership.

== History ==
Various Native American tribes lived in or around Hartford, all Algonquian peoples. These included the Podunks, mostly east of the Connecticut River; the Poquonocks north and west of Hartford; the Massacoes in the Simsbury area; the Tunxis tribe in West Hartford and Farmington; the Wangunks to the south; and the Saukiog in Hartford itself.

=== Colonial Hartford ===
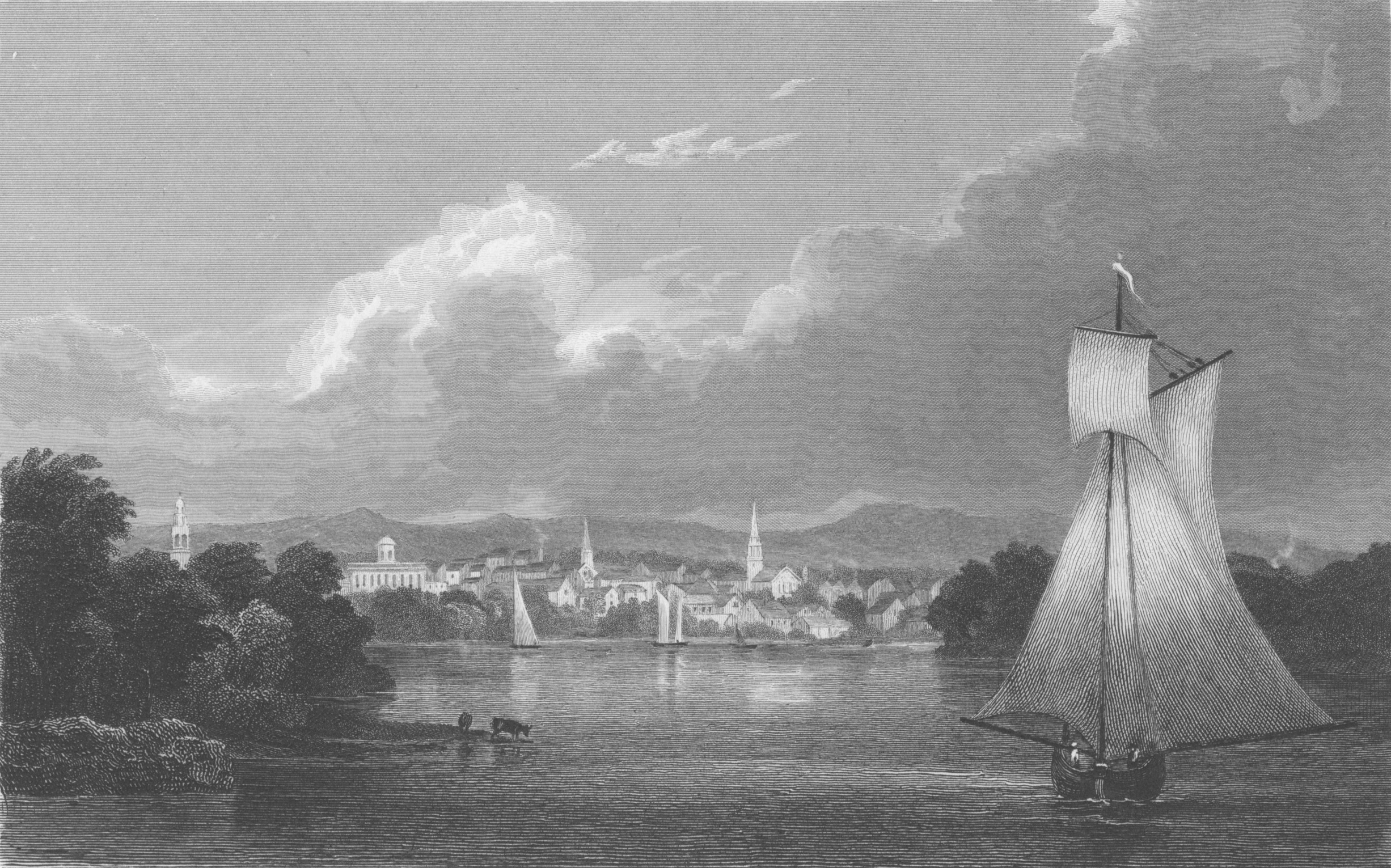
Hartford, c. 1770s

The first Europeans known to have explored the area were the Dutch under Adriaen Block, who sailed up the Connecticut in 1614. Dutch fur traders from New Amsterdam returned in 1623 with a mission to establish a trading post and fortify the area for the Dutch West India Company. The original site was located on the south bank of the Park River in the present-day Sheldon/Charter Oak neighborhood. This fort was called Fort Hoop or the "House of Hope." In 1633, Jacob Van Curler formally bought the land around Fort Hoop from the Pequot chief for a small sum. It was home to perhaps a couple of families and a few dozen soldiers. The fort was abandoned by 1654, but the area is known today as Dutch Point; the name of the Dutch fort "House of Hope" is reflected in the name of Huyshope Avenue. A significant reason for establishment of the Dutch trading post was to better control the flow of wampum, the de facto currency of New Netherland and portions of New England, to and from valuable Native American fur traders.

The Dutch outpost and the tiny contingent of Dutch soldiers who were stationed there did little to check the English migration, and the Dutch soon realized that they were vastly outnumbered. The House of Hope remained an outpost, but it was steadily swallowed up by waves of English settlers. In 1650, Peter Stuyvesant met with English representatives to negotiate a permanent boundary between the Dutch and English colonies; the line that they agreed on was more than 50 miles (80 km) west of the original settlement.

The English began to arrive in 1636, settling upstream from Fort Hoop near the present-day Downtown and Sheldon/Charter Oak neighborhoods. Puritan pastors Thomas Hooker and Samuel Stone, along with Governor John Haynes, led 100 settlers with 130 head of cattle in a trek from Newtown in the Massachusetts Bay Colony (now Cambridge) and started their settlement just north of the Dutch fort. The settlement was originally called Newtown, but it was changed to Hartford in 1637 in honor of Stone's hometown of Hertford, England. The etymology of Hartford is the ford where harts cross, or "deer crossing."

As the Puritan minister in Hartford, Thomas Hooker wielded a great deal of power; in 1638, he delivered a sermon that inspired the writing of the Fundamental Orders of Connecticut, which provided a framework for Connecticut's separation for Massachusetts Bay Colony and the formation of a civil government. The Fundamental Orders of Connecticut were the legal basis for Connecticut Colony until the 1662 royal charter granted to Connecticut by Charles II.

The original settlement area contained the site of the Charter Oak, an old white oak tree in which colonists hid Connecticut's Royal Charter of 1662 to protect it from confiscation by an English governor-general. The state adopted the oak tree as the emblem on the Connecticut state quarter. The Charter Oak Monument is located at the corner of Charter Oak Place, a historic street, and Charter Oak Avenue.

=== 19th century ===
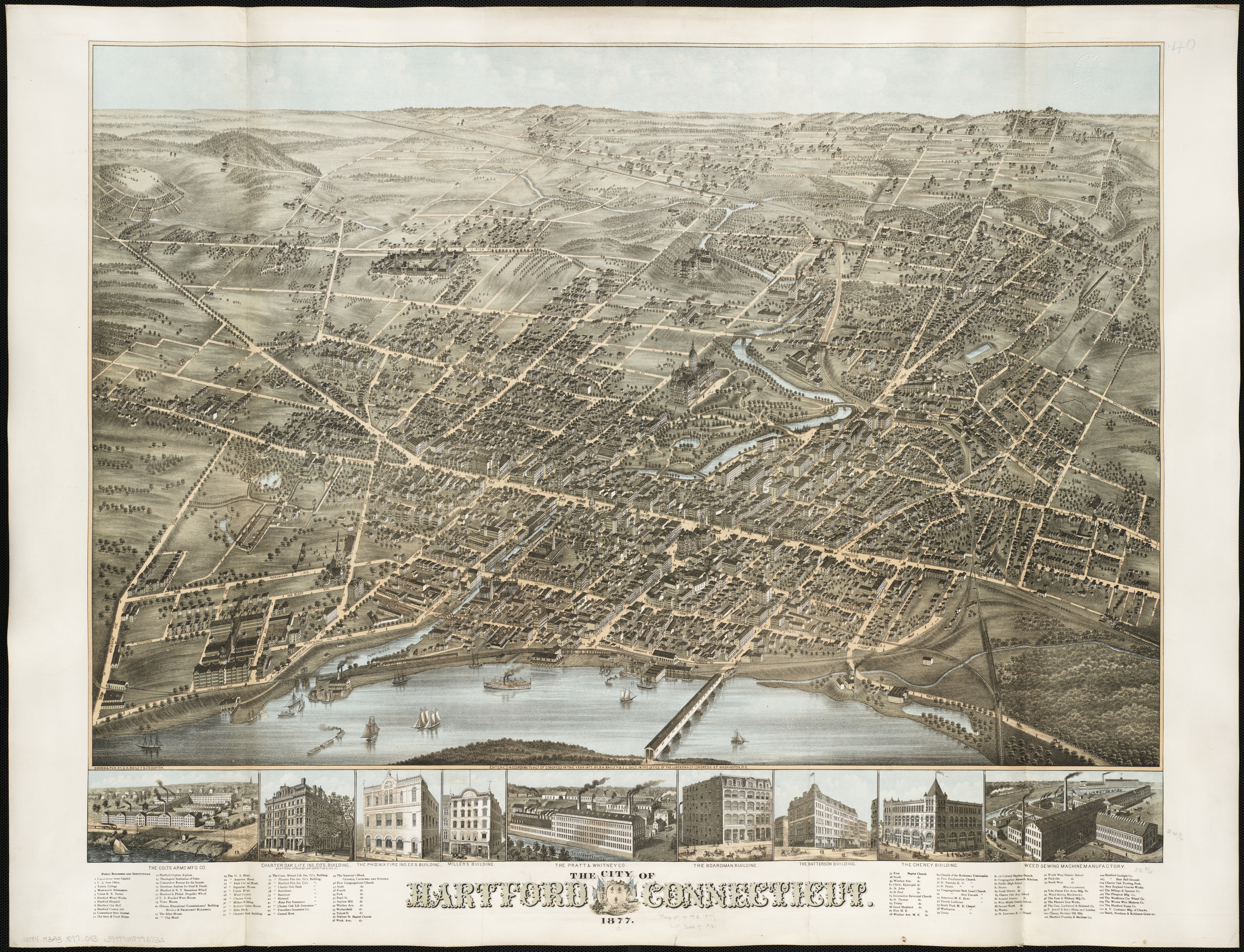
1877 map of Hartford

==== Political turmoil ====
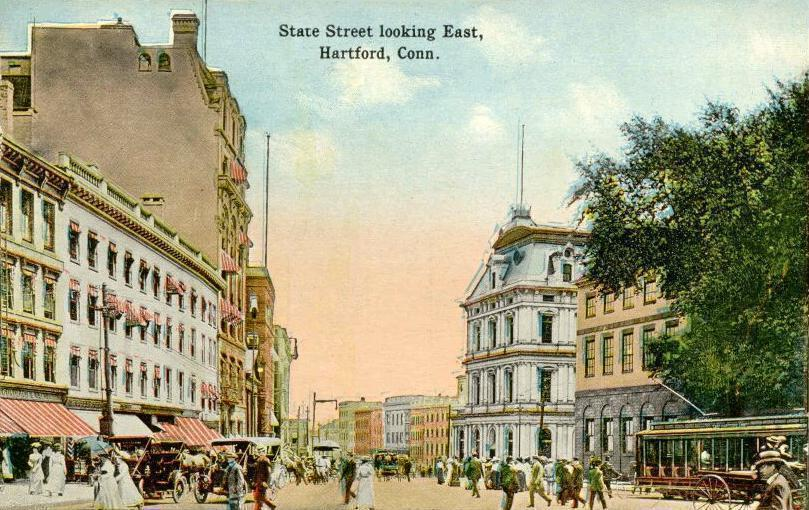
State Street in 1914

On December 15, 1814, delegates from the five New England states (Maine was still part of Massachusetts at that time) gathered at the Hartford Convention to discuss New England's possible secession from the United States. During the early 19th century, the Hartford area was a center of abolitionist activity, and the most famous abolitionist family was the Beechers. The Reverend Lyman Beecher was an important Congregational minister known for his anti-slavery sermons. His daughter Harriet Beecher Stowe wrote Uncle Tom's Cabin; her brother Henry Ward Beecher was a noted clergyman who vehemently opposed slavery and supported the temperance movement and women's suffrage. The Stowes' sister Isabella Beecher Hooker was a leading member of the women's rights movement.

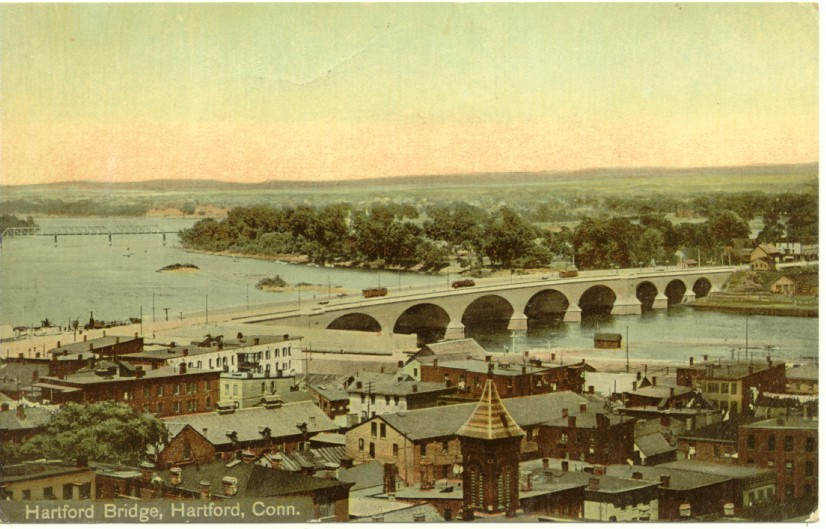
Bulkeley Bridge, c. 1906–1916

In 1860, Hartford was the site of the first "Wide Awakes", abolitionist supporters of Abraham Lincoln. These supporters organized torch-light parades that were both political and social events, often including fireworks and music, in celebration of Lincoln's visit to the city. This type of event caught on and eventually became a staple of mid-to-late 19th-century campaigning.

Hartford was a major manufacturing city from the 19th century until the mid-20th century. During the Industrial Revolution into the mid-20th century, the Connecticut River Valley cities produced many major precision manufacturing innovations. Among these was Hartford's pioneer bicycle and automobile maker Pope. Many factories have been closed or relocated, or have reduced operations, as in nearly all former Northern manufacturing cities.

==== Rise of a major manufacturing center ====
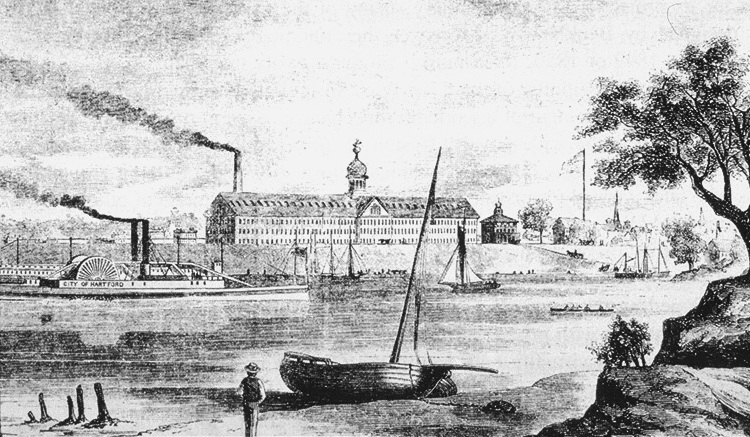
Colt's Armory from an 1857 engraving viewed from the east

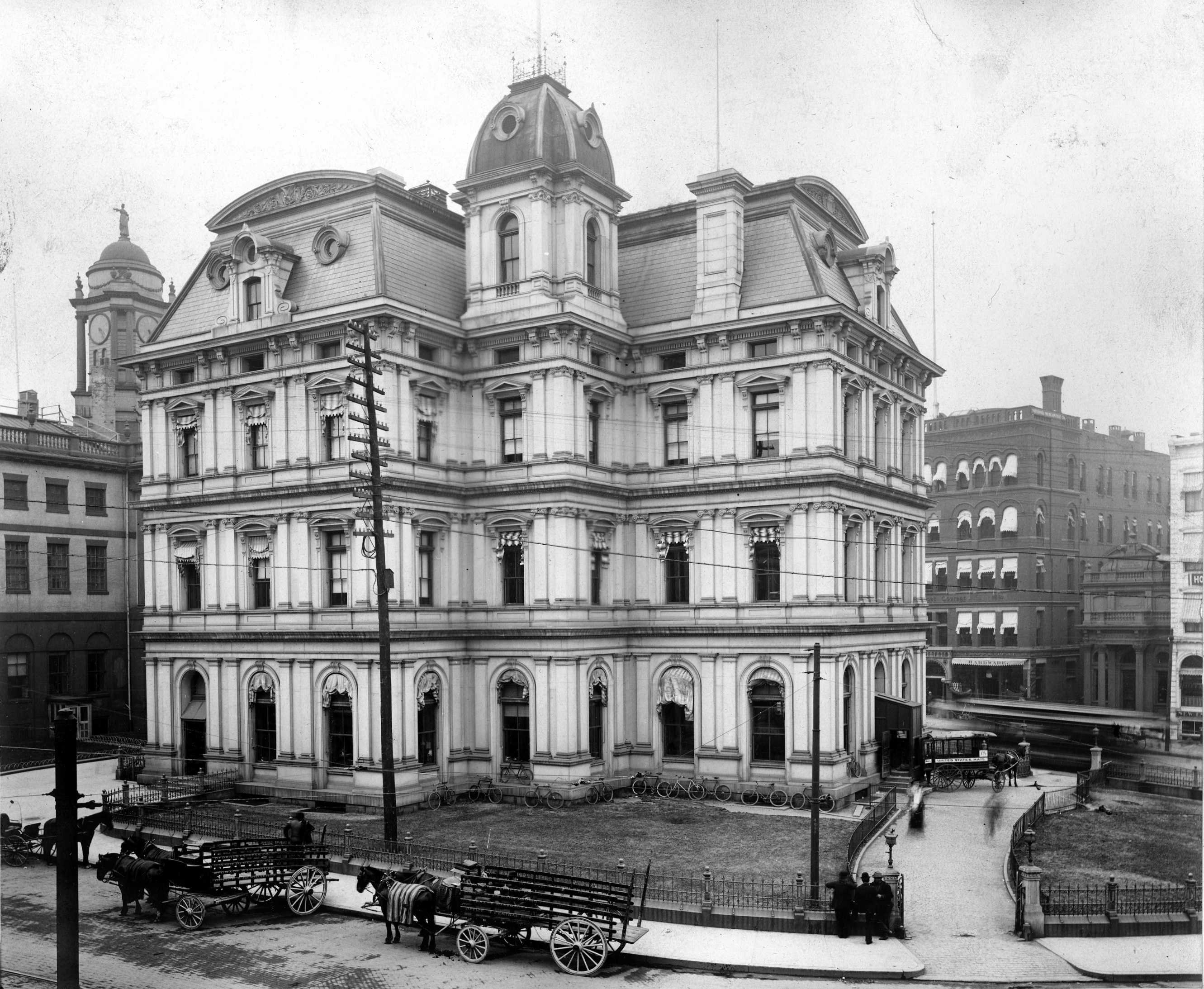
Old Post Office and Custom House next to the Old State House (left) in 1903. The building was completed in 1882 and demolished in 1934.

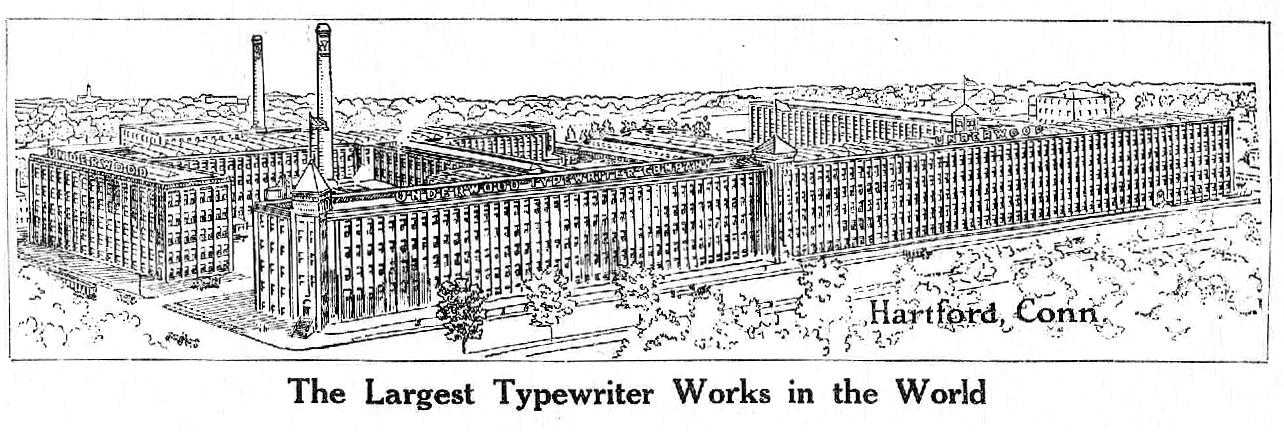
Underwood Typewriter factory in Hartford, c. 1911–1912

Around 1850, Hartford native Samuel Colt perfected the precision manufacturing process that enabled the mass production of thousands of his revolvers with interchangeable parts. A variety of industries adopted and adapted these techniques over the next several decades, and Hartford became the center of production for a wide array of products, including: Colt, Richard Gatling, and John Browning firearms; Weed sewing machines; Columbia bicycles; Pope automobiles; and leading typewriter manufacturers Royal Typewriter Company and Underwood Typewriter Company, which together made Hartford the "Typewriter Capitol of the World" during the first half of the 20th century.

The Pratt & Whitney Company was founded in Hartford in 1860 by Francis A. Pratt and Amos Whitney. They built a substantial factory in which the company manufactured a wide range of machine tools, including tools for the makers of sewing machines, and gun-making machinery for use by the Union Army during the American Civil War. In 1925, the company expanded into aircraft engine design at its Hartford factory.

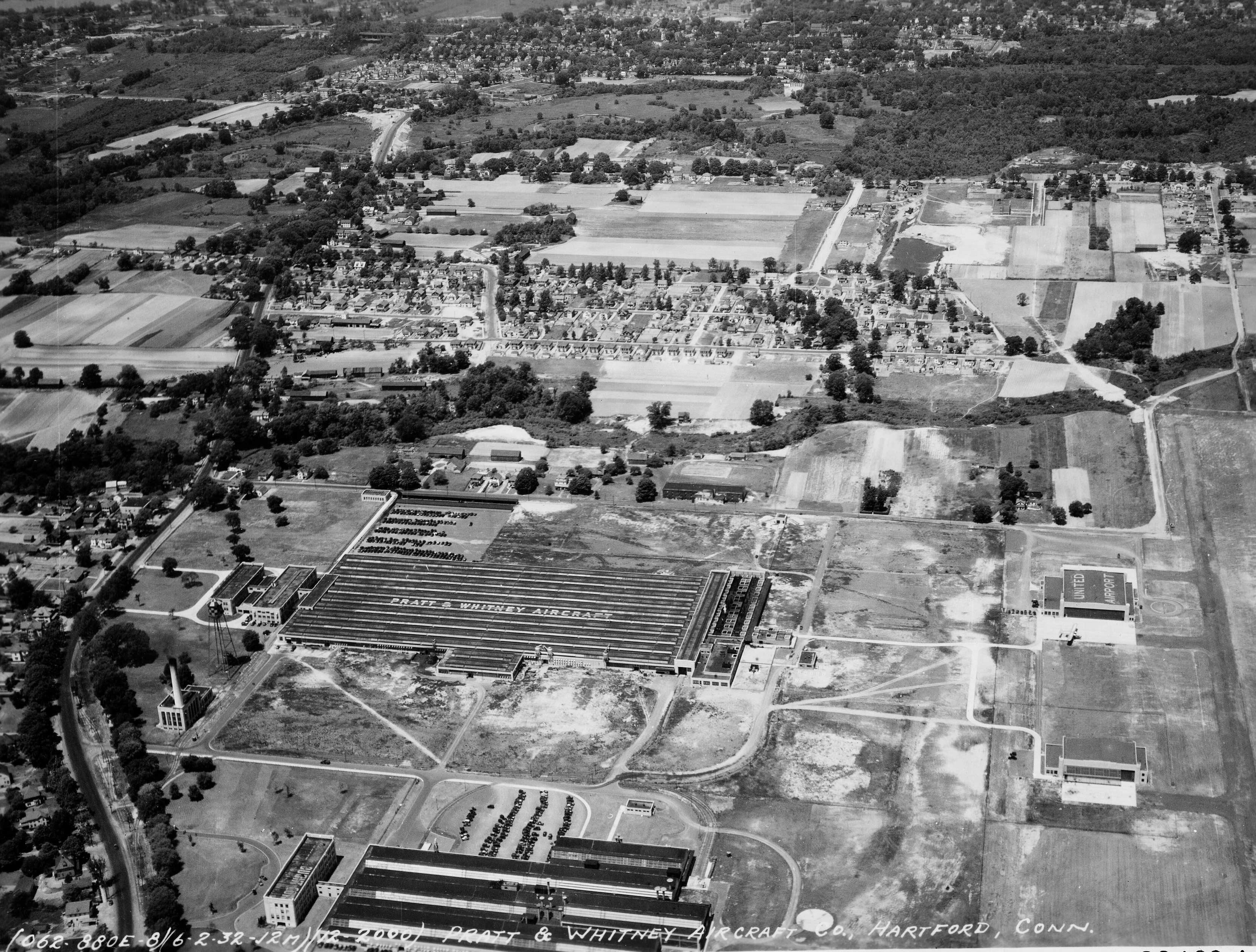
Pratt & Whitney Factory, 1940

Just three years after Colt's first factory opened, the Sharps Rifle Manufacturing Company set up shop in 1852 at a nearby site along the now-buried Park River, located in the present-day neighborhood of Frog Hollow. Their factory heralded the beginning of the area's transformation from marshy farmland into a major industrial zone. The road leading from town to the factory was called Rifle Lane; the name was later changed to College Street and then Capitol Avenue. A century earlier, mills had located along the Park River because of the water power, but by the 1850s water power was approaching obsolescence. Sharps located there specifically to take advantage of the railroad line that had been constructed alongside the river in 1838.

The Sharps Rifle Company failed in 1870, and the Weed Sewing Machine Company took over its factory. The invention of a new type of sewing machine led to a new application of mass production after the principles of interchangeability were applied to clocks and guns. The Weed Company played a major role in making Hartford one of three machine tool centers in New England and even outranked the Colt Armory in nearby Coltsville in size. Weed eventually became the birthplace of both the bicycle and automobile industries in Hartford.

Industrialist Albert Pope was inspired by a British-made, high-wheeled bicycle (called a velocipede) that he saw at the 1876 Philadelphia Centennial Exposition, and he bought patent rights for bicycle production in the United States. He wanted to contract out his first order, however, so he approached George Fairfield of Weed Sewing Machine Company, who produced Pope's first run of bicycles in 1878. Bicycles proved to be a huge commercial success, and production expanded in the Weed factory, with Weed making every part but the tires. Demand for bicycles overshadowed the failing sewing machine market by 1890, so Pope bought the Weed factory, took over as its president, and renamed it the Pope Manufacturing Company. The bicycle boom was short-lived, peaking near the turn of the century when more and more consumers craved individual automobile travel, and Pope's company suffered financially from over-production amidst falling demand.

In an effort to save his business, Pope opened a motor carriage department and turned out electric carriages, beginning with the "Mark III" in 1897. His venture might have made Hartford the capital of the automobile industry were it not for the ascendancy of Henry Ford and a series of pitfalls and patent struggles that outlived Pope himself.

In 1876, Hartford Machine Screw was granted a charter "for the purpose of manufacturing screws, hardware and machinery of every variety." The basis for its incorporation was the invention of the first single-spindle automatic screw machine. For its next four years, the new firm occupied one of Weed's buildings, milling thousands of screws daily on over 50 machines. Its president was George Fairfield, who ran Weed, and its superintendent was Christopher Spencer, one of Connecticut's most versatile inventors. Soon Hartford Machine Screw outgrew its quarters and built a new factory adjacent to Weed, where it remained until 1948.

=== 20th century ===
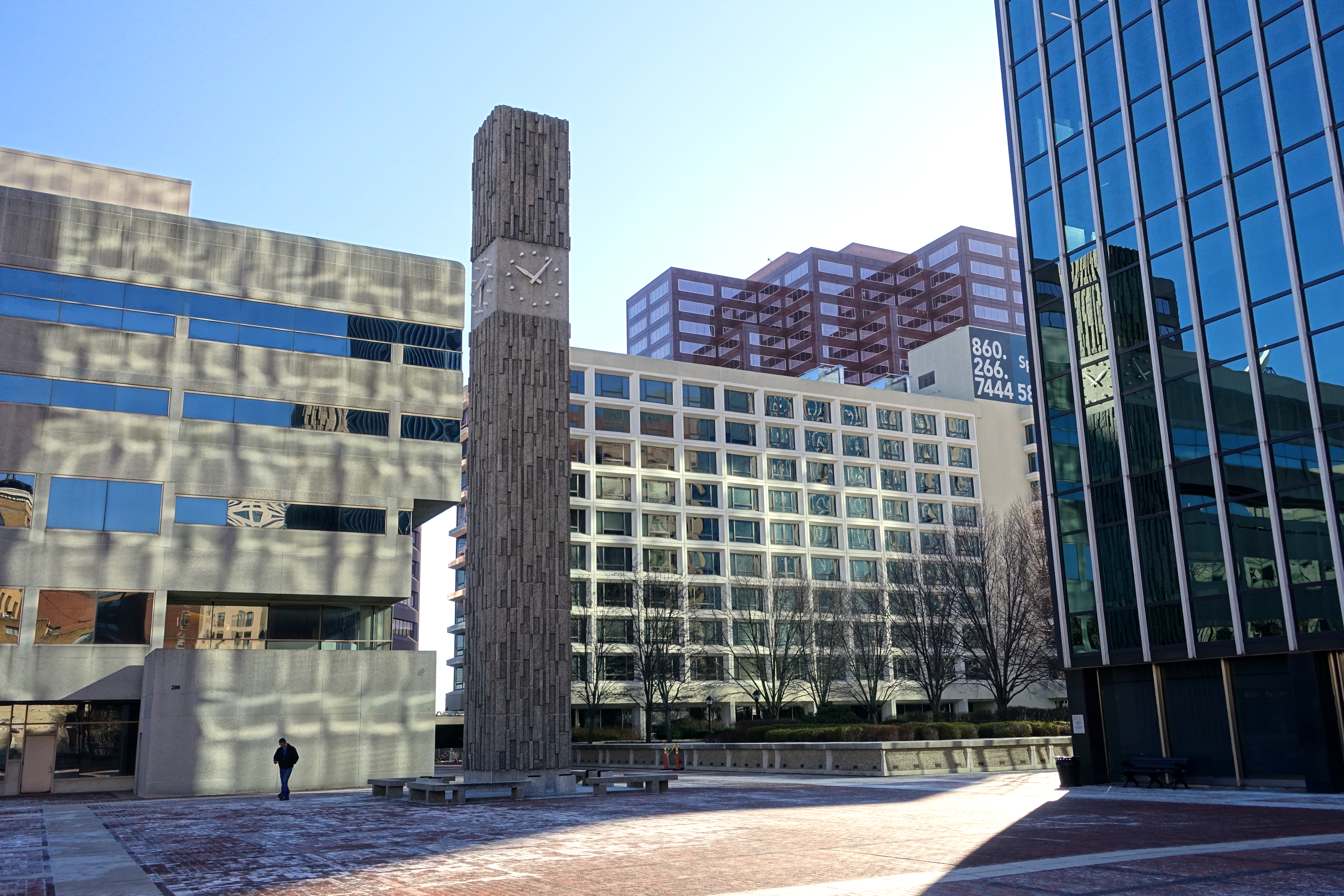
Constitution Plaza's clock tower

On the week of April 12, 1909, the Connecticut River reached a record flood stage of 24.5 feet (7.5 meters) above the low-water mark, flooding the city of Hartford and doing great damage. On July 6, 1944, Hartford was the scene of one of the worst fire disasters in the history of the United States. Claiming the lives of 168 persons, mostly children and their mothers, and injuring several hundred more. It occurred at a matinee performance of the Ringling Brothers and Barnum and Bailey Circus on Barbour Street in the city's north end and became known as the Hartford Circus Fire.

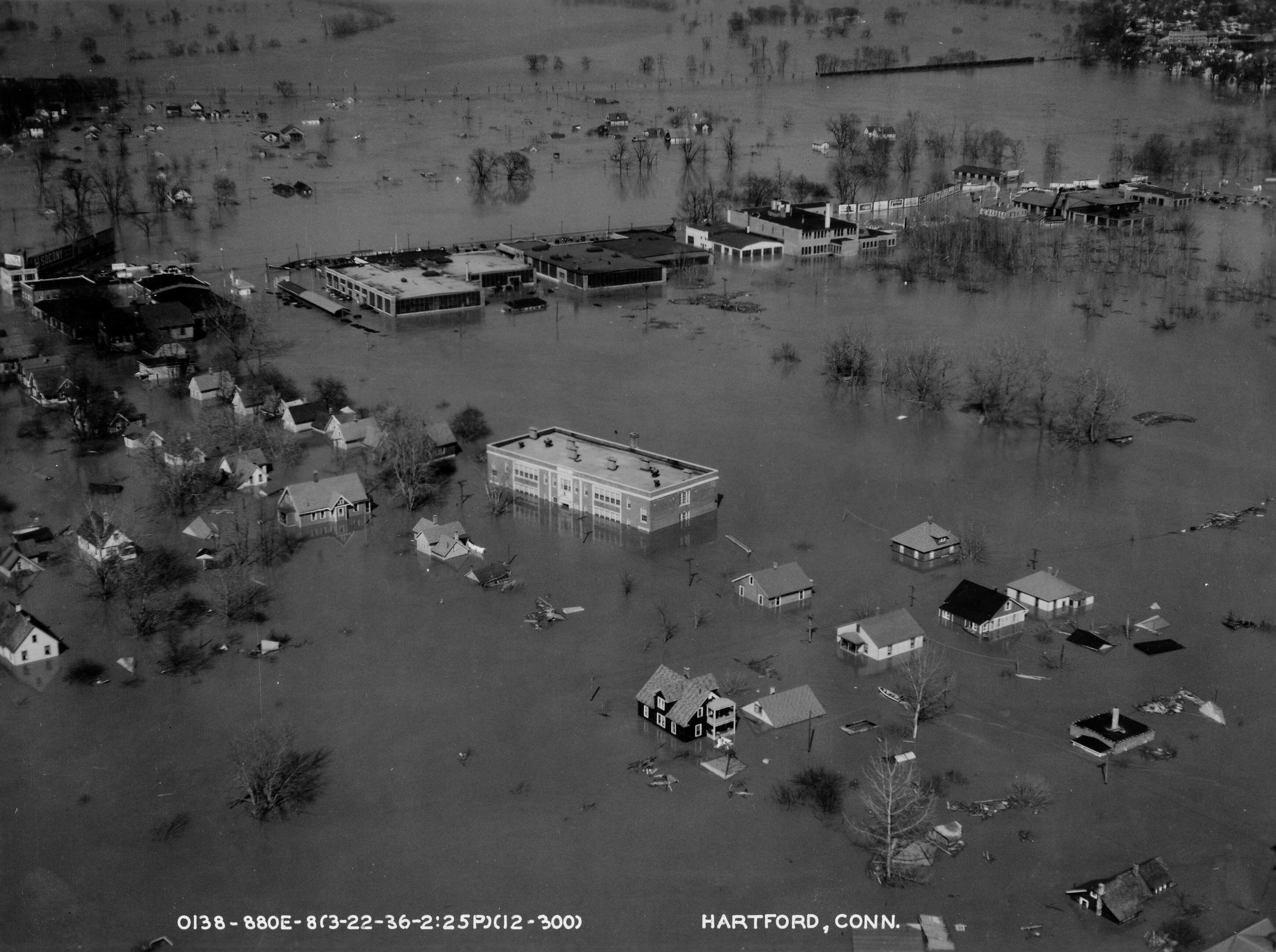
Connecticut River Flood, 1930

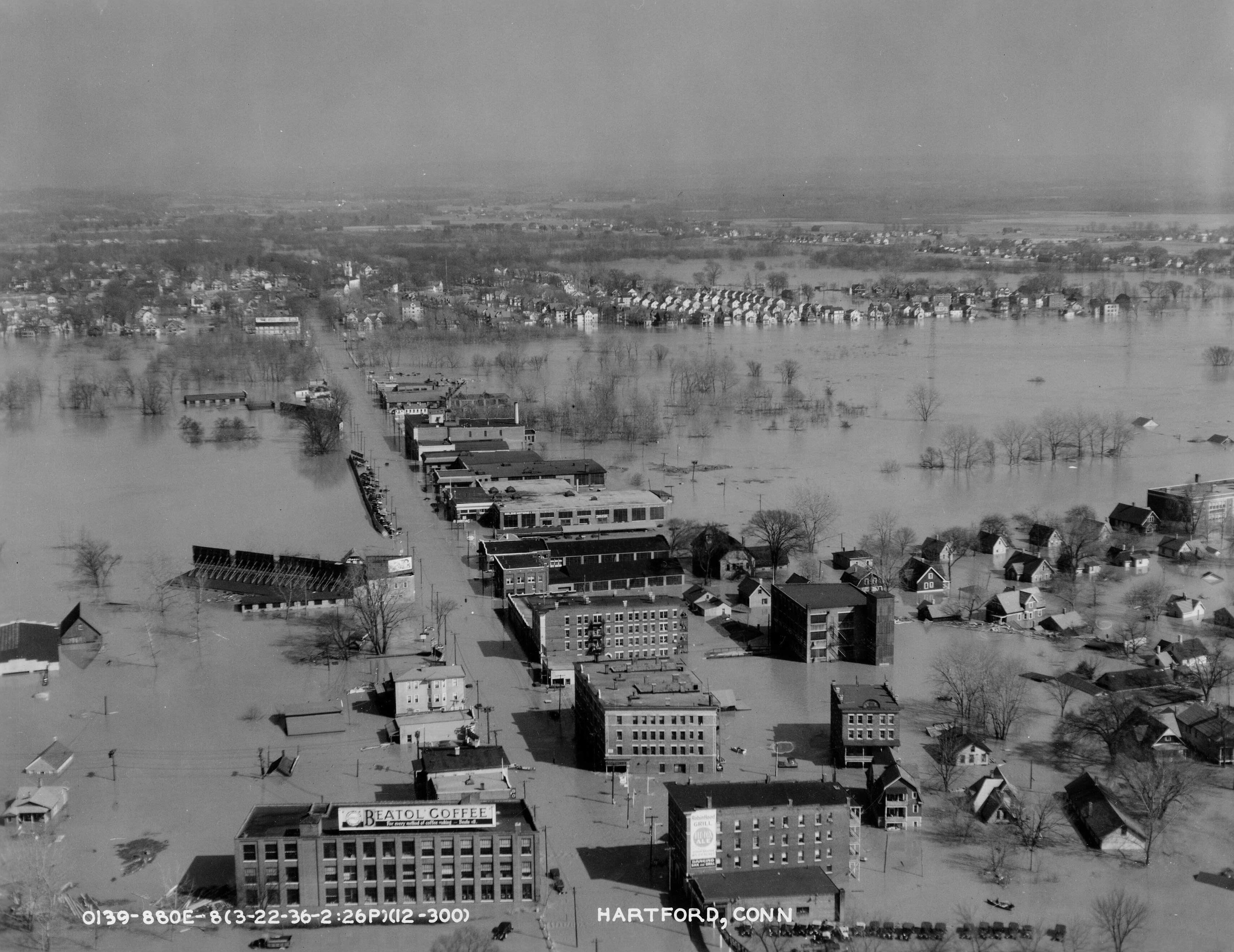
Connecticut River Flood, 1930

After World War II, many residents of Puerto Rico moved to Hartford. Starting in the late 1950s, the suburbs ringing Hartford began to grow and flourish and the capital city began a long decline. Insurance giant Connecticut General (now CIGNA) moved to a new, modern campus in the suburb of Bloomfield. Constitution Plaza had been hailed as a model of urban renewal, but it gradually became a concrete office park. Once-flourishing department stores shut down, such as Brown Thomson, Sage-Allen, and G. Fox & Co., as suburban malls grew in popularity, such as Westfarms and Buckland Hills.

In 1997, the city lost its professional hockey franchise, with the Hartford Whalers moving to Raleigh, North Carolina—despite an increase in season ticket sales and an offer from the state for a new arena. In 2005, a developer from Newton, Massachusetts tried unsuccessfully to bring an NHL team back to Hartford and house them in a new, publicly funded stadium.

Hartford experienced problems as the population shrank 11 percent during the 1990s. Only Flint, Michigan; Gary, Indiana; St. Louis, Missouri; and Baltimore, Maryland experienced larger population losses during the decade. Nonetheless, the population has increased since the 2000 Census.

In 1987, Carrie Saxon Perry was elected mayor of Hartford, becoming the first female African-American mayor of a major American city. Riverfront Plaza was opened in 1999, connecting the riverfront and the downtown area for the first time since the 1960s.

=== 21st century ===
A significant number of cultural events and performances take place every year at Mortensen Plaza (Riverfront Recapture Organization) by the banks of the Connecticut River. These events are held outdoors and include live music, festivals, dance, arts and crafts. Hartford also has a vibrant theater scene with major Broadway productions at the Bushnell Theater as well as performances at the Hartford Stage and TheaterWorks (City Arts).

In July 2017, Hartford considered filing Chapter 9 bankruptcy. After years of contending with a shrinking population base and high pension obligations, a $65 million budget gap was projected for the year of 2018. The city had cut the budget of public services and received union concessions, but these measures did not balance the budget. A state bailout later that year kept the city from filing for bankruptcy.

Downtown Hartford is busy during the day with commuters, but tends to be quiet in the evenings and weekends. More recently, increased residential and retail development has begun changing the pattern.

== Geography ==
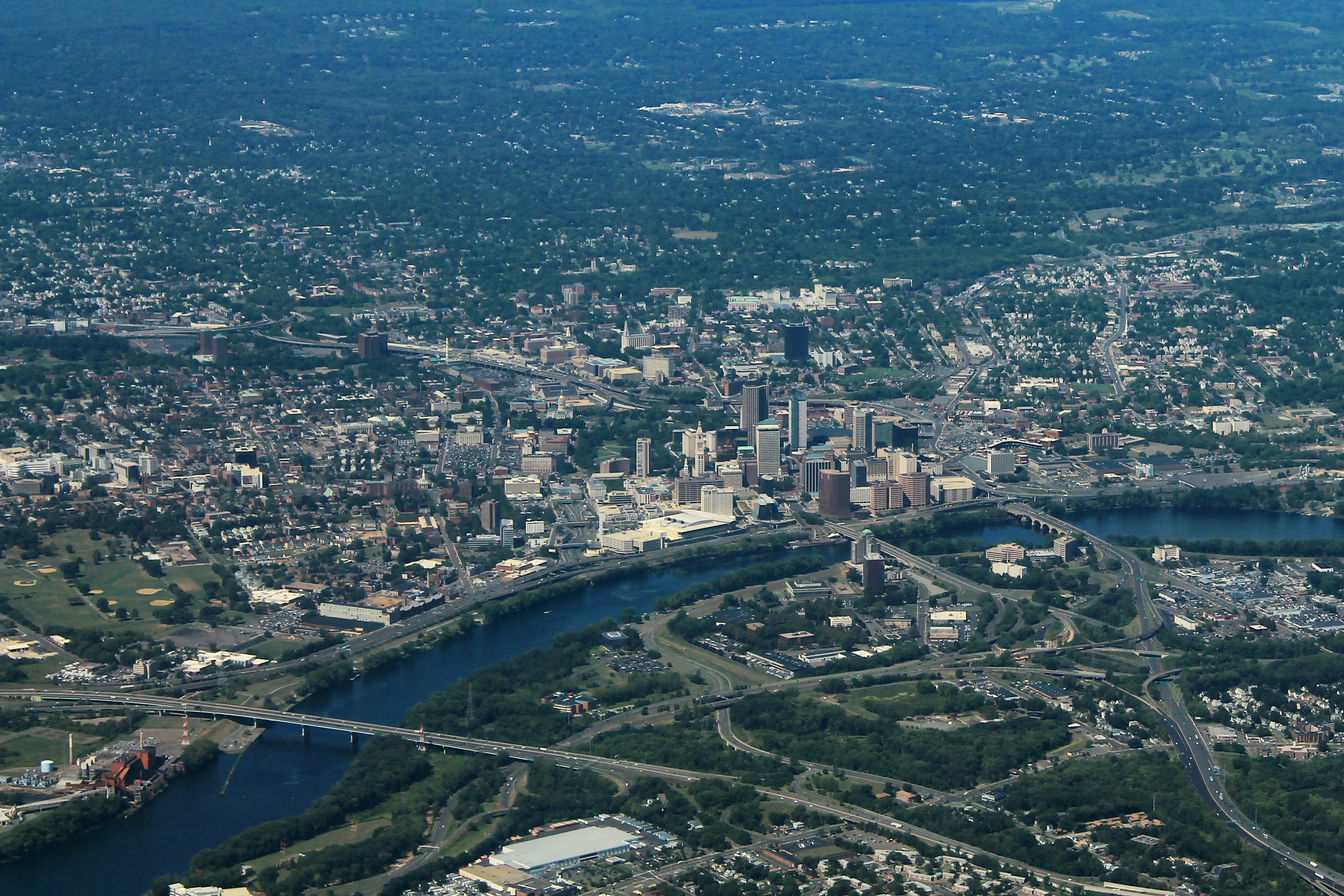
Downtown Hartford from the air, 2016

According to the United States Census Bureau, the city has a total area of 18.0 square miles (47 km^{2}), of which 17.3 square miles (45 km^{2}) is land and 0.7 square miles (1.8 km^{2}) (3.67%) is water.

The city of Hartford is bordered by the towns of West Hartford, Newington, Wethersfield, East Hartford, Bloomfield, South Windsor, Glastonbury, and Windsor. The Connecticut River forms the boundary between Hartford and East Hartford, and is located on the east side of the city.

The Park River originally divided Hartford into northern and southern sections and was a major part of Bushnell Park, but the river was nearly completely enclosed and buried by flood control projects in the 1940s. The former course of the river can still be seen in some of the roadways that were built in the river's place, such as Jewell Street and the Conland-Whitehead Highway.

=== Climate ===
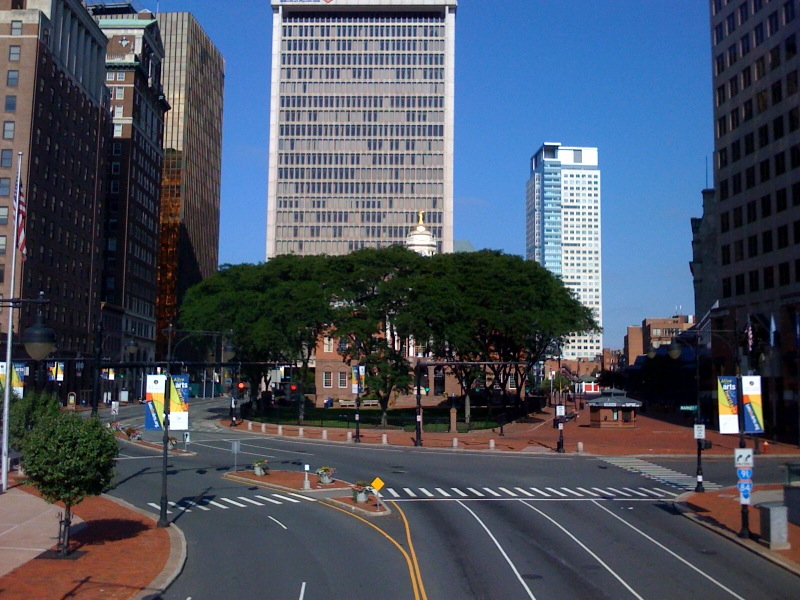
State House Square in Downtown Hartford, 2008

The Köppen climate classification categorizes Hartford as hot-summer humid continental (Dfa). Winters are moderately cold, with periods of snow, while summers are hot and humid. Spring and fall are normally transition seasons, with weather ranging from warm to cool. The city of Hartford lies in USDA Hardiness zone 6b-7a.

Seasonally, the period from April through October is warm to hot in Hartford, with the hottest months being June, July, and August. In the summer months there is often high humidity and occasional (but brief) thundershowers. The cool to cold months are from November through March, with the coldest months in December, January, and February having average highs of 35 to 38 °F (2 to 3 °C) and overnight lows of around 18 to 23 °F (−8 to −5 °C).

The average annual precipitation is approximately 47.05 inches (1,200 mm), which is distributed fairly evenly throughout the year. Hartford typically receives about 51.7 inches (131 cm) of snow in an average winter—about 40% more than coastal Connecticut cities like New Haven, Stamford, and New London. Seasonal snowfall has ranged from 115.2 inches (293 cm) during the winter of 1995–96 to 13.5 inches (34 cm) in 1999–2000. During the summer, temperatures reach or exceed 90 °F (32 °C) on an average of 17 days per year; in the winter, overnight temperatures can dip to a range of 5 to −5 °F (−15 to −21 °C) on at least one night a year. Tropical storms and hurricanes have also struck Hartford, although the occurrence of such systems is rare and is usually confined to the remnants of such storms. Hartford saw extensive damage from the 1938 New England Hurricane, as well as with Hurricane Irene in 2011. The highest officially recorded temperature is 103 °F (39 °C) on July 22, 2011, and the lowest is −26 °F (−32 °C) on January 22, 1961; the record cold daily maximum is −2 °F (−19 °C) on December 2, 1917, while, conversely, the record warm daily minimum is 80 °F (27 °C) on July 31, 1917.

Climate data for Bradley International Airport, Connecticut (1991–2020 normals, (Note: Mean monthly maxima and minima (i.e. the expected highest and lowest temperature readings at any point during the year or given month) calculated based on data at said location from 1991 to 2020.) extremes 1905–present) (Note: Official records for Hartford kept at downtown from January 1905 to December 1948, Brainard Airport from January 1949 to December 1954, and at Bradley Int'l in Windsor Locks since January 1955.)
Month	Jan	Feb	Mar	Apr	May	Jun	Jul	Aug	Sep	Oct	Nov	Dec	Year
Record high °F (°C)	72 (22)	77 (25)	89 (32)	96 (36)	99 (37)	100 (38)	103 (39)	102 (39)	101 (38)	91 (33)	84 (29)	76 (24)	103 (39)
Mean maximum °F (°C)	57.0 (13.9)	57.7 (14.3)	68.2 (20.1)	82.3 (27.9)	90.4 (32.4)	93.2 (34.0)	95.9 (35.5)	94.2 (34.6)	89.6 (32.0)	80.2 (26.8)	70.6 (21.4)	60.1 (15.6)	97.7 (36.5)
Mean daily maximum °F (°C)	35.8 (2.1)	38.5 (3.6)	47.3 (8.5)	60.5 (15.8)	71.7 (22.1)	79.9 (26.6)	85.2 (29.6)	83.3 (28.5)	75.7 (24.3)	63.5 (17.5)	51.5 (10.8)	40.6 (4.8)	61.1 (16.2)
Daily mean °F (°C)	27.1 (−2.7)	29.6 (−1.3)	37.8 (3.2)	49.5 (9.7)	60.0 (15.6)	68.9 (20.5)	74.3 (23.5)	72.5 (22.5)	64.8 (18.2)	53.0 (11.7)	42.3 (5.7)	32.6 (0.3)	51.0 (10.6)
Mean daily minimum °F (°C)	18.8 (−7.3)	20.7 (−6.3)	28.2 (−2.1)	38.4 (3.6)	48.4 (9.1)	57.8 (14.3)	63.4 (17.4)	61.7 (16.5)	53.8 (12.1)	42.4 (5.8)	33.0 (0.6)	24.6 (−4.1)	40.9 (4.9)
Mean minimum °F (°C)	−0.9 (−18.3)	1.9 (−16.7)	11.4 (−11.4)	26.3 (−3.2)	34.7 (1.5)	44.9 (7.2)	53.0 (11.7)	50.1 (10.1)	38.5 (3.6)	27.7 (−2.4)	17.7 (−7.9)	7.7 (−13.5)	−3.4 (−19.7)
Record low °F (°C)	−26 (−32)	−24 (−31)	−6 (−21)	9 (−13)	28 (−2)	37 (3)	44 (7)	36 (2)	30 (−1)	17 (−8)	1 (−17)	−18 (−28)	−26 (−32)
Average precipitation inches (mm)	3.28 (83)	3.13 (80)	3.81 (97)	3.88 (99)	3.79 (96)	4.28 (109)	4.17 (106)	4.21 (107)	4.39 (112)	4.52 (115)	3.51 (89)	4.08 (104)	47.05 (1,195)
Average snowfall inches (cm)	14.2 (36)	14.8 (38)	9.4 (24)	1.1 (2.8)	0.0 (0.0)	0.0 (0.0)	0.0 (0.0)	0.0 (0.0)	0.0 (0.0)	0.7 (1.8)	1.4 (3.6)	10.1 (26)	51.7 (131)
Average precipitation days (≥ 0.01 in)	10.9	10.5	11.2	11.5	12.3	11.8	10.7	10.4	9.2	10.5	9.9	11.5	130.4
Average snowy days (≥ 0.1 in)	6.1	6.2	3.8	0.7	0.0	0.0	0.0	0.0	0.0	0.1	0.9	4.5	22.3
Average relative humidity (%)	63.9	63.0	60.4	58.0	63.0	67.3	68.0	70.6	72.9	69.2	68.3	68.0	66.1
Average dew point °F (°C)	13.6 (−10.2)	15.8 (−9.0)	23.4 (−4.8)	32.4 (0.2)	45.0 (7.2)	55.6 (13.1)	61.0 (16.1)	60.1 (15.6)	53.1 (11.7)	40.8 (4.9)	31.3 (−0.4)	19.8 (−6.8)	37.7 (3.1)
Mean monthly sunshine hours	169.8	176.1	213.9	228.2	258.6	273.4	293.1	269.6	223.6	199.4	139.4	139.5	2,584.6
Percentage possible sunshine	58	59	58	57	57	60	64	63	60	58	47	49	58
Average ultraviolet index	1	2	4	6	7	8	8	8	6	4	2	1	5
Source 1: NOAA (relative humidity, dew point, and sun 1961–1990)
Source 2: Weather Atlas (UV)

=== Neighborhoods ===
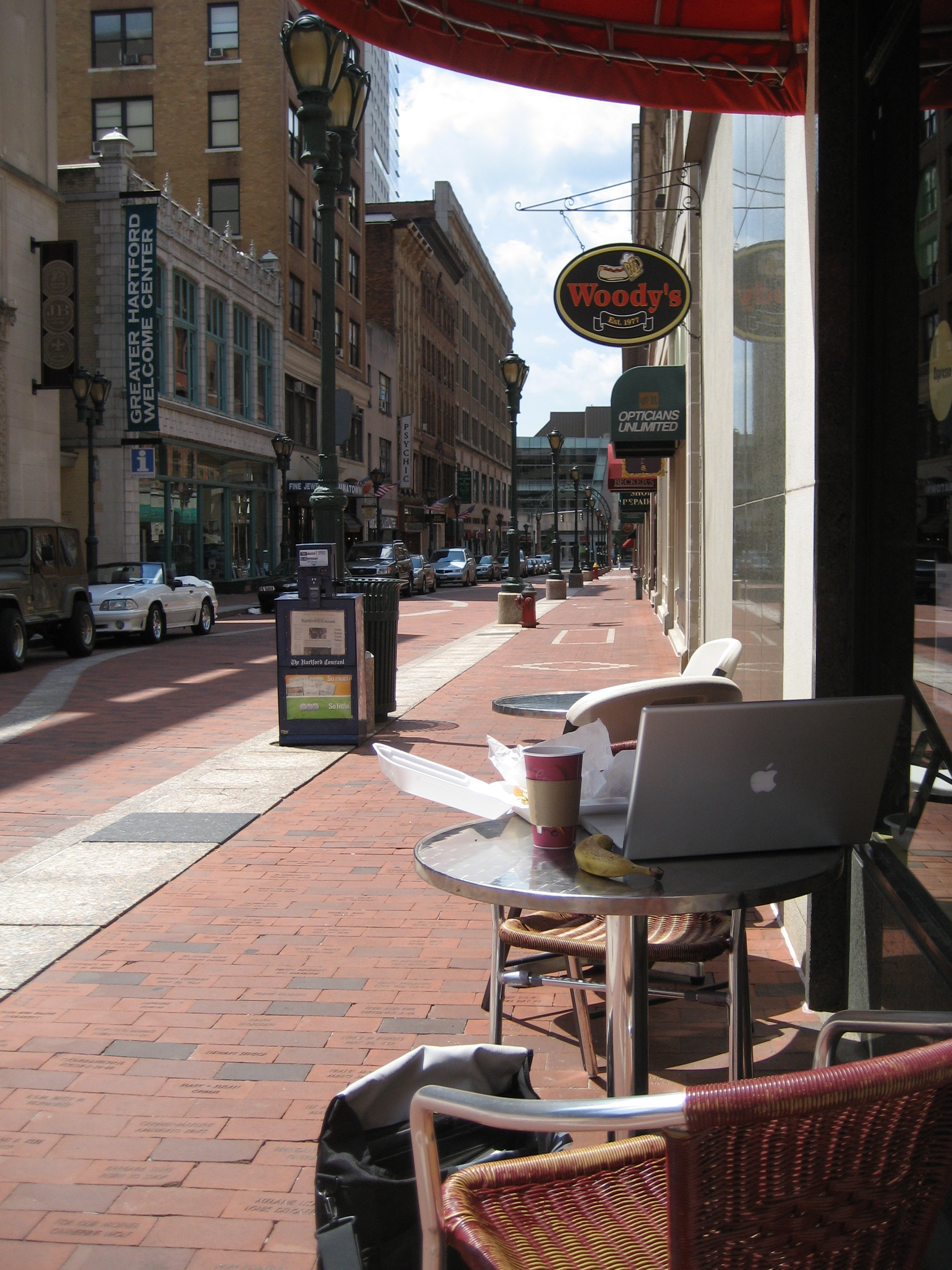
Pratt Street in Downtown Hartford

The central business district, as well as the State Capitol, Old State House and a number of museums and shops are located Downtown. Parkville, home to Real Art Ways, is named for the confluence of the north and the south branches of the Park River. Frog Hollow, in close proximity to Downtown, is home to Pope Park and Trinity College, which is one of the nation's oldest institutions of higher learning. Asylum Hill, a mixed residential and commercial area, houses the headquarters of several insurance companies as well as the historic homes of Mark Twain and Harriet Beecher Stowe. The West End, home to the Governor's residence, Elizabeth Park, and the University of Connecticut School of Law, abuts the Hartford Golf Club. Sheldon Charter Oak is renowned as the location of the Charter Oak and its successor monument as well as the former Colt headquarters including Samuel Colt's family estate, Armsmear. The North East neighborhood is home to Keney Park and a number of the city's oldest and most ornate homes. The South End features "Little Italy" and was the home of Hartford's sizeable Italian community. South Green hosts Hartford Hospital. The South Meadows is the site of Hartford–Brainard Airport and Hartford's industrial community. The North Meadows has retail strips, car dealerships, and Comcast Theatre. Blue Hills is home of the University of Hartford and also houses the largest per capita of residents claiming Jamaican-American heritage in the United States. Other neighborhoods in Hartford include Barry Square, Behind the Rocks, Clay Arsenal, South West, and Upper Albany, which is dotted by many Caribbean restaurants and specialty stores.

== Demographics ==
Historical population
Census	Pop.	Note	%±
1790	2,683		—
1800	3,523		31.3%
1810	3,955		12.3%
1820	4,726		19.5%
1830	7,074		49.7%
1840	9,468		33.8%
1850	17,966		89.8%
1860	29,152		62.3%
1870	37,180		27.5%
1880	42,015		13.0%
1890	53,230		26.7%
1900	79,850		50.0%
1910	98,915		23.9%
1920	138,036		39.6%
1930	164,072		18.9%
1940	166,267		1.3%
1950	177,397		6.7%
1960	162,178		−8.6%
1970	158,017		−2.6%
1980	136,392		−13.7%
1990	139,739		2.5%
2000	121,578		−13.0%
2010	124,775		2.6%
2020	121,054		−3.0%
2024 (est.)	122,129	▲	0.9%
Population 1800–1990

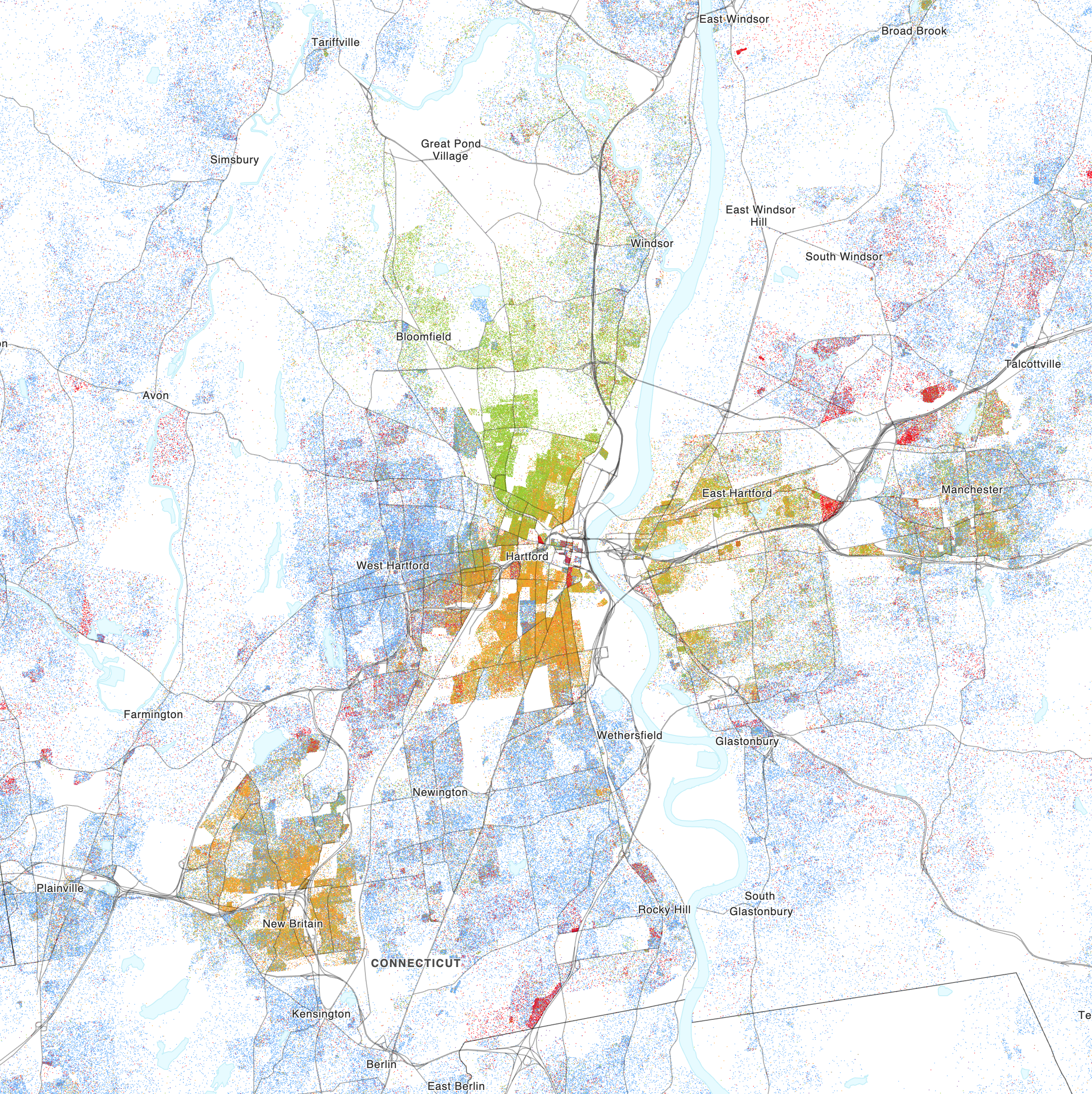
Map of racial distribution in Hartford, 2020 U.S. census. Each dot is one person: ⬤ White ⬤ Black ⬤ Asian ⬤ Hispanic ⬤ Multiracial ⬤ Native American/Other

Hartford, Connecticut – Racial and ethnic composition Note: the US Census treats Hispanic/Latino as an ethnic category. This table excludes Latinos from the racial categories and assigns them to a separate category. Hispanics/Latinos may be of any race.
Race / Ethnicity (NH = Non-Hispanic)	Pop 2000	Pop 2010	Pop 2020	% 2000	% 2010	% 2020
White alone (NH)	21,677	19,765	15,278	17.83%	15.84%	12.62%
Black or African American alone (NH)	43,775	44,223	43,024	36.01%	35.44%	35.54%
Native American or Alaska Native alone (NH)	328	309	262	0.27%	0.25%	0.22%
Asian alone (NH)	1,898	3,347	4,208	1.56%	2.68%	3.48%
Pacific Islander alone (NH)	42	27	34	0.03%	0.02%	0.03%
Some Other Race alone (NH)	685	851	1,411	0.56%	0.68%	1.17%
Mixed Race or Multi-Racial (NH)	3,913	2,068	3,522	3.22%	1.66%	2.91%
Hispanic or Latino (any race)	49,260	54,185	53,315	40.52%	43.43%	44.04%
Total	121,578	124,775	121,054	100.00%	100.00%	100.00%

At the 2010 United States census, there were 124,775 people, 44,986 households, and 27,171 families residing in the city. At the American Community Survey's 2019 estimates, the population increased to 123,088. The 2020 United States census tabulated a population of 121,054.

Hartford's racial and ethnic makeup in 2019 was 36.0% White, 42.7% Black or African American, 23.7% some other race, 3.4% Asian, 1.2% American Indian or Alaska Native, and 0.3% Native Hawaiian and other Pacific Islanders. 43.4% of the population were Hispanic or Latino, chiefly of Puerto Rican origin. Non-Hispanic Whites were 15.8% of the population in 2010.

The city's Hispanic and Latino population primarily consisted of Puerto Ricans (33.63%), Dominicans (3.0%), Mexicans (1.6%), Cubans (0.4%) and other Hispanic or Latinos at 5.63%.

The Hispanic and Latino population is concentrated on the city's south side, while African Americans are concentrated in the north. The white population forms a majority in only two census tracts: the downtown area and the far northwest. Nevertheless, many areas in the middle of the city, in Asylum Hill, and in West End, have a significant white population. More than three-quarters (77%) of the Hispanic population was Puerto Rican (with more than half born on the island of Puerto Rico) and fully 33.7% of all Hartford residents claimed Puerto Rican heritage. This is the second-largest concentration of Puerto Ricans in the Northeast, behind only Holyoke, Massachusetts, approximately 30 miles (48 km) to the north along the Connecticut River.

There are small but recognizable concentrations of people with origins in Mexico, Colombia, Peru, and the Dominican Republic as well. Among the non-Hispanic population, the largest ancestry group is from Jamaica; in 2014, Hartford was home to an estimated 11,400 Jamaican Americans, as well as another 1,200 people who identified otherwise as West Indian Americans.

There were 44,986 households, out of which 34.4% had children under the age of 18 living with them, 25.2% were married couples living together, 29.6% had a female householder with no husband present, and 39.6% were non-families. 33.2% of all households were made up of individuals, and 9.6% had someone living alone who was 65 years of age or older. The average household size was 2.58 and the average family size was 3.33.

In the city, the population distribution skews young: 30.1% under the age of 18, 12.6% from 18 to 24, 29.8% from 25 to 44, 18.0% from 45 to 64, and 9.5% who were 65 years of age or older. The median age was 30 years. For every 100 females, there were 91.4 males. For every 100 females age 18 and over, there were 86.0 males.

The median income for a household in the city was $20,820, and the median income for a family was $22,051. Males had a median income of $28,444 versus $26,131 for females. The per capita income for the city was $13,428.

== Economy ==
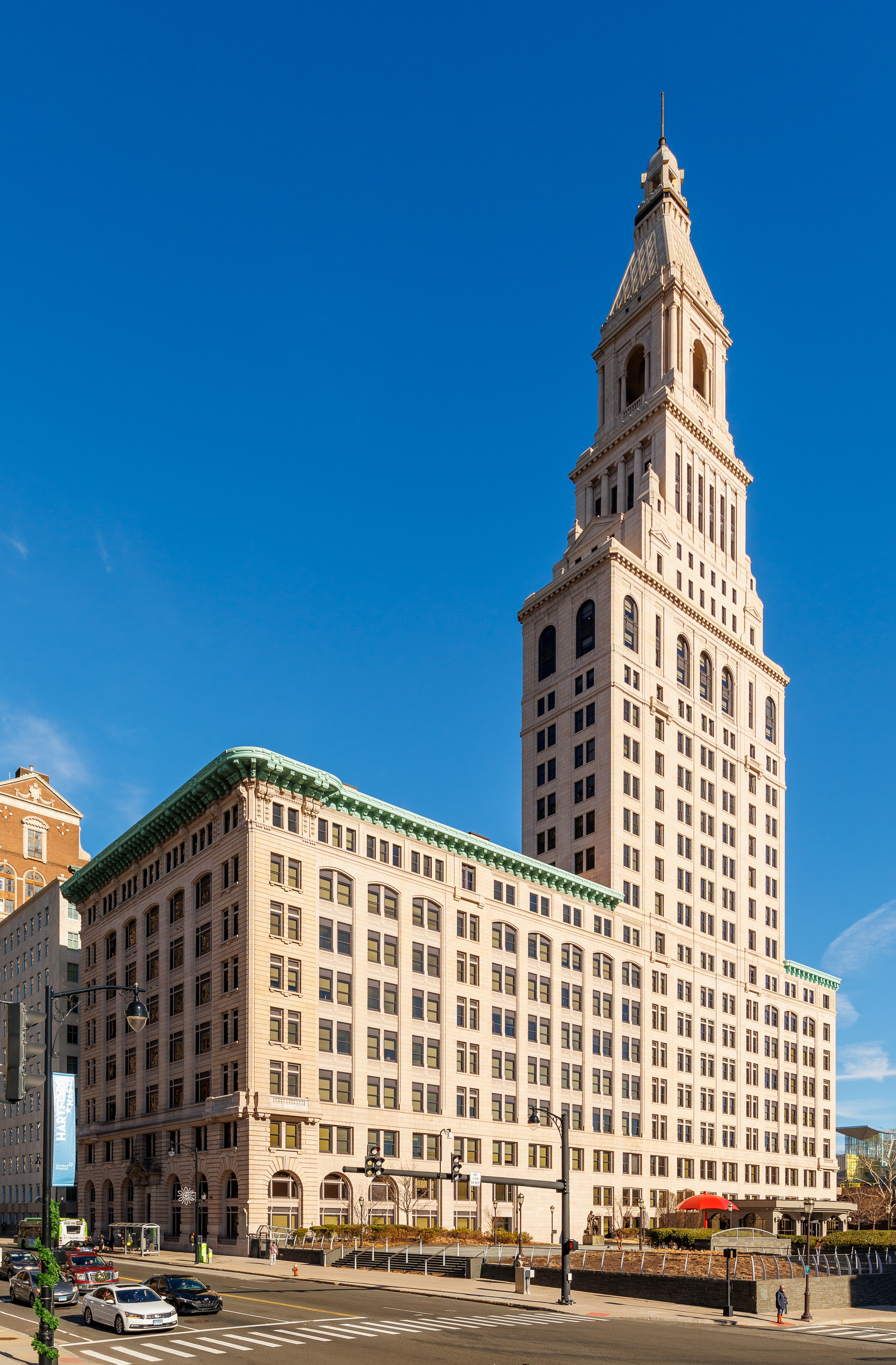
Travelers Tower in Downtown Hartford

Hartford is a center for medical care, research, and education. Within the city of Hartford itself, hospitals include Hartford Hospital, The Institute of Living, Connecticut Children's Medical Center, and Saint Francis Hospital & Medical Center (which merged in 1990 with Mount Sinai Hospital).

Hartford is also the historic international center of the insurance industry, with companies like Aetna, Conning & Company, The Hartford, Harvard Pilgrim Health Care, The Phoenix Companies, and Hartford Steam Boiler based in the city, and companies like Prudential Financial, Lincoln National Corporation, Sun Life Financial Travelers, UnitedHealthcare, and Axa XL having major operations in the city. Insurance giant Aetna had its headquarters in Hartford before announcing a relocation to New York City in July 2017. When CVS acquired Aetna a few months later, however, they announced Aetna would remain in Hartford for at least four years. The city is also home to the corporate headquarters of CareCentrix, Choice Merchant Solutions, Global Atlantic Financial Group, Hartford Healthcare, Insurity, LAZ Parking, ProPark Mobility, U.S. Fire Arms, and Virtus Investment Partners.

In 2008, Sovereign Bank consolidated two bank branches as well as its regional headquarters in a nineteenth-century palazzo on Asylum Street. Bank of America and People's United Financial have a significant corporate presence in Hartford. In 2009, Northeast Utilities, a Fortune 500 company and New England's largest energy utility, announced it would establish its corporate headquarters downtown.

Hartford is a burgeoning technology hub. In March 2018, Infosys announced that opening of a new technology innovation hub in Hartford, creating up to 1,000 jobs by 2022. The Hartford technology innovation hub will focus on three key sectors- insurance, healthcare and manufacturing. Hartford has continued to attract technology companies including CGI Inc., Covr Financial Technologies, GalaxE. Solutions, HCL Technologies and Larsen & Toubro. Insurance software provider Insurity is also headquartered in the city.

Local unemployment remains high in Hartford compared to other cities, the state, and the U.S. Of the four major cities in Connecticut (Bridgeport, New Haven, and Stamford), Hartford's unemployment rate of 7.5% in the fall of 2018 was the highest. As a whole, Connecticut's unemployment rate remains above 5% while the national rate hovers just under 4%.

== Arts and culture ==
=== Cuisine ===
The first American cookbook was American Cookery, The Art of Dressing Viands, Fish, Poultry, and Vegetables by Amelia Simmons, published in Hartford by Hudson & Goodwin in 1796. It was also the first cookbook to include recipes for squash and cornmeal, and it contained the first published recipe for pumpkin pie. It influenced a generation of American baking with a recipe for leavening bread with pearl ash. The full text of the book is available online.

Hartford's cuisine was shaped by its early settlers, who brought Dutch and English influence that combined with that of the Saukiog Native Americans in the area. The first half of the 20th century brought significant Polish immigration and a number of Polish restaurants, some of which still operate today. Italian food wasn't always accepted; a long-time Hartford restaurant owner recollected that, "in 1938, you wouldn't put an Italian name on a restaurant sign because everyone would think you were associated with the Mafia." The New York Times remarked on the diversity of food available in Hartford in 1979, noting that "Hartford has undergone a culinary revolution in recent years."

Hartford earned praise from Food and Wine as "a foodie destination". Food trucks are restricted to designated areas in the city, mostly along Bushnell Park in Downtown Hartford and at farmers' markets. Food can today be found throughout the city from a very wide variety of ethnic influence.

Hartford hosts a number of seasonal farmers' markets. The Hartford Regional Market is the largest market between New York City and Boston. In 2018, the Connecticut State Assembly voted to transfer ownership of the Regional Market to the Capital Region Development Authority, leaving its future somewhat uncertain.

The seashore is less than 35 miles (56 km) away and has played a large role in Hartford's food habits. Recently there has been an aquaculture boom in Long Island Sound, and as a result local kelp has started to appear on plates. The Connecticut River Valley is the most agriculturally productive region in New England and neighboring Wethersfield is renowned for its red onions, whose smell was said to waft into Hartford when production was at its historical height in the early 1800s.

Hartford and the surrounding area have craft beer, cider, and spirit industry, and there were more than two dozen breweries and distilleries in the Hartford area in 2017. The Connecticut Spirits Trail has a number of stops in Hartford and surrounding towns. These businesses all feed the city's collection of bars and nightclubs.

=== Points of interest ===
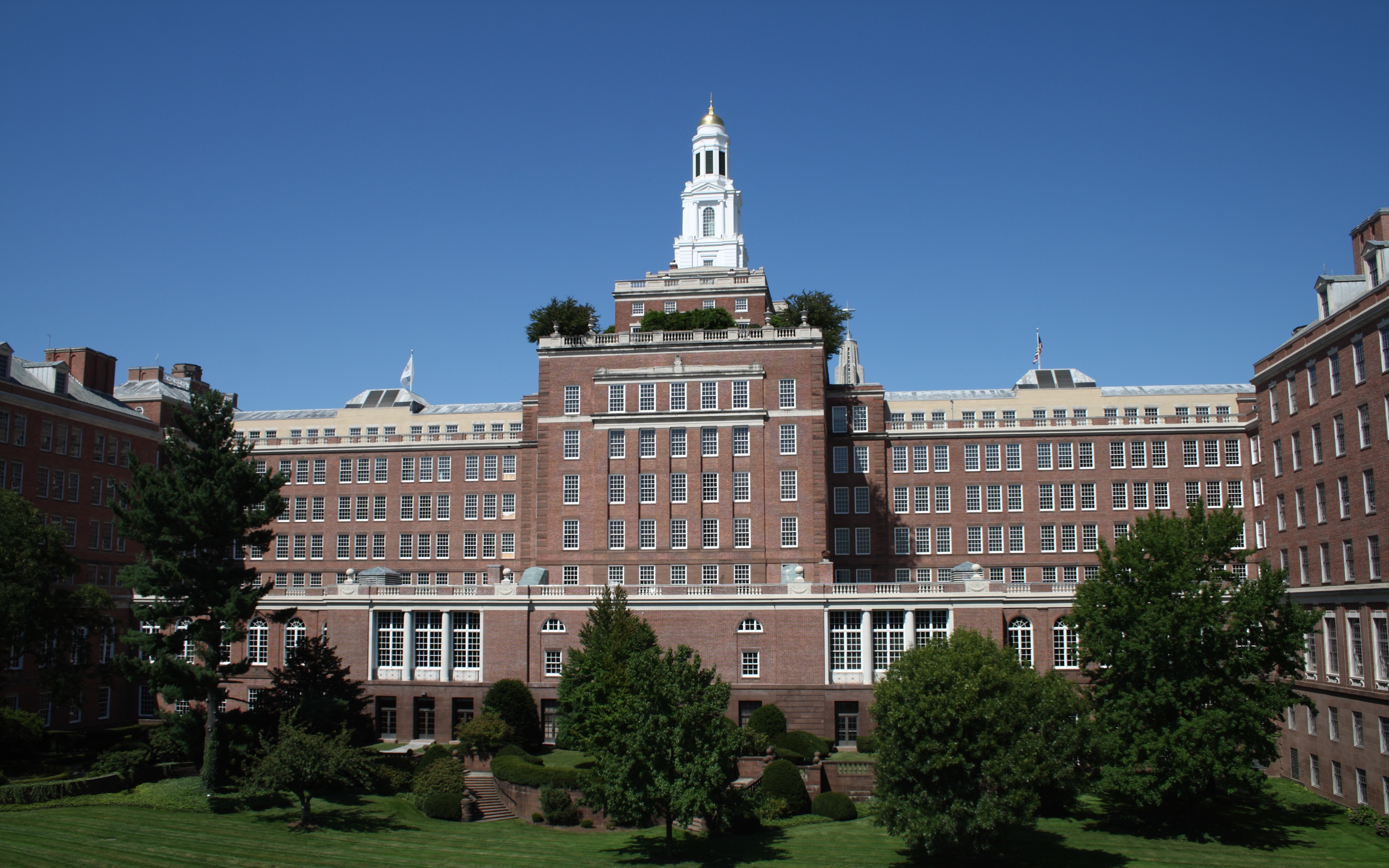
Aetna building in the Asylum Hill neighborhood

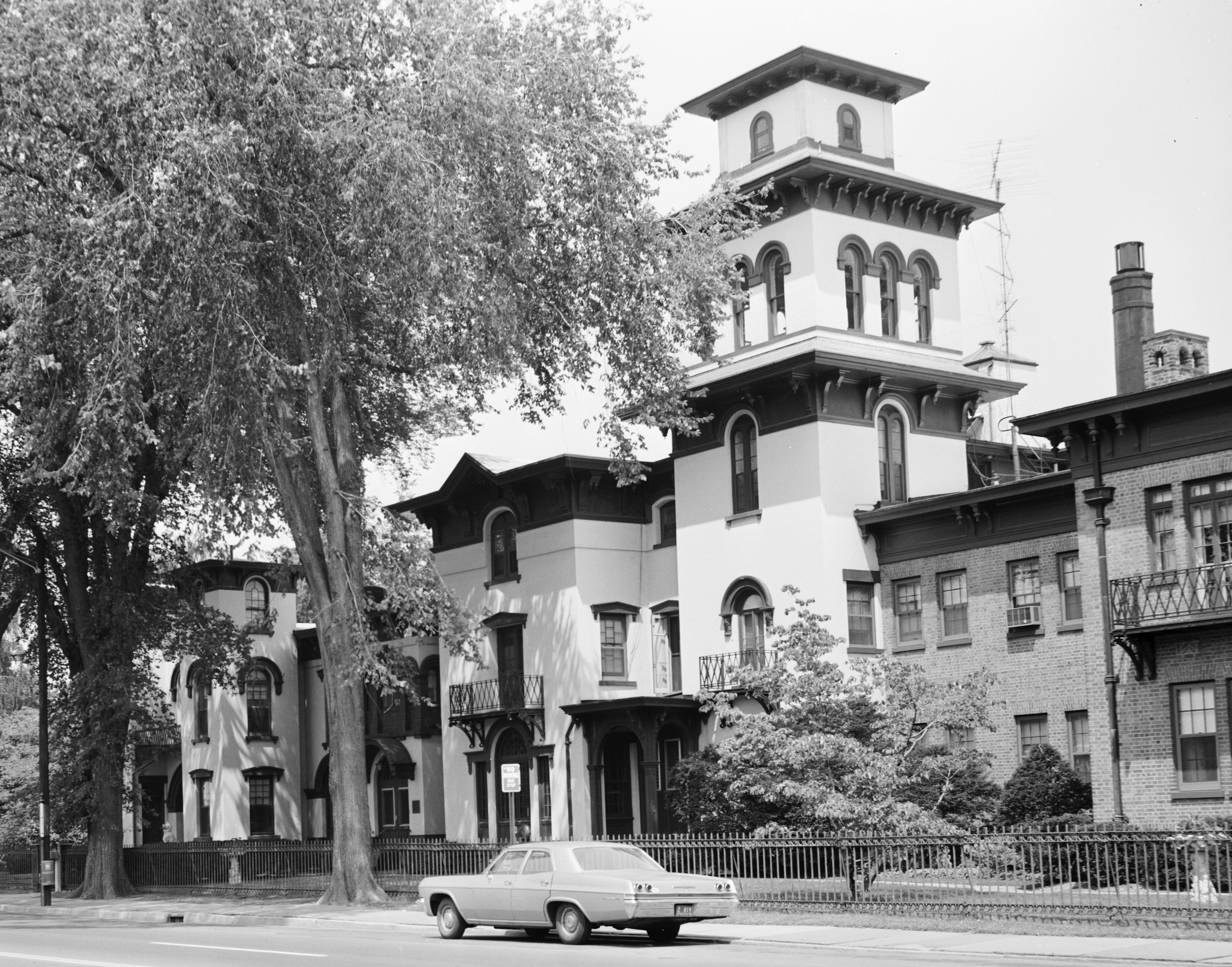
Armsmear

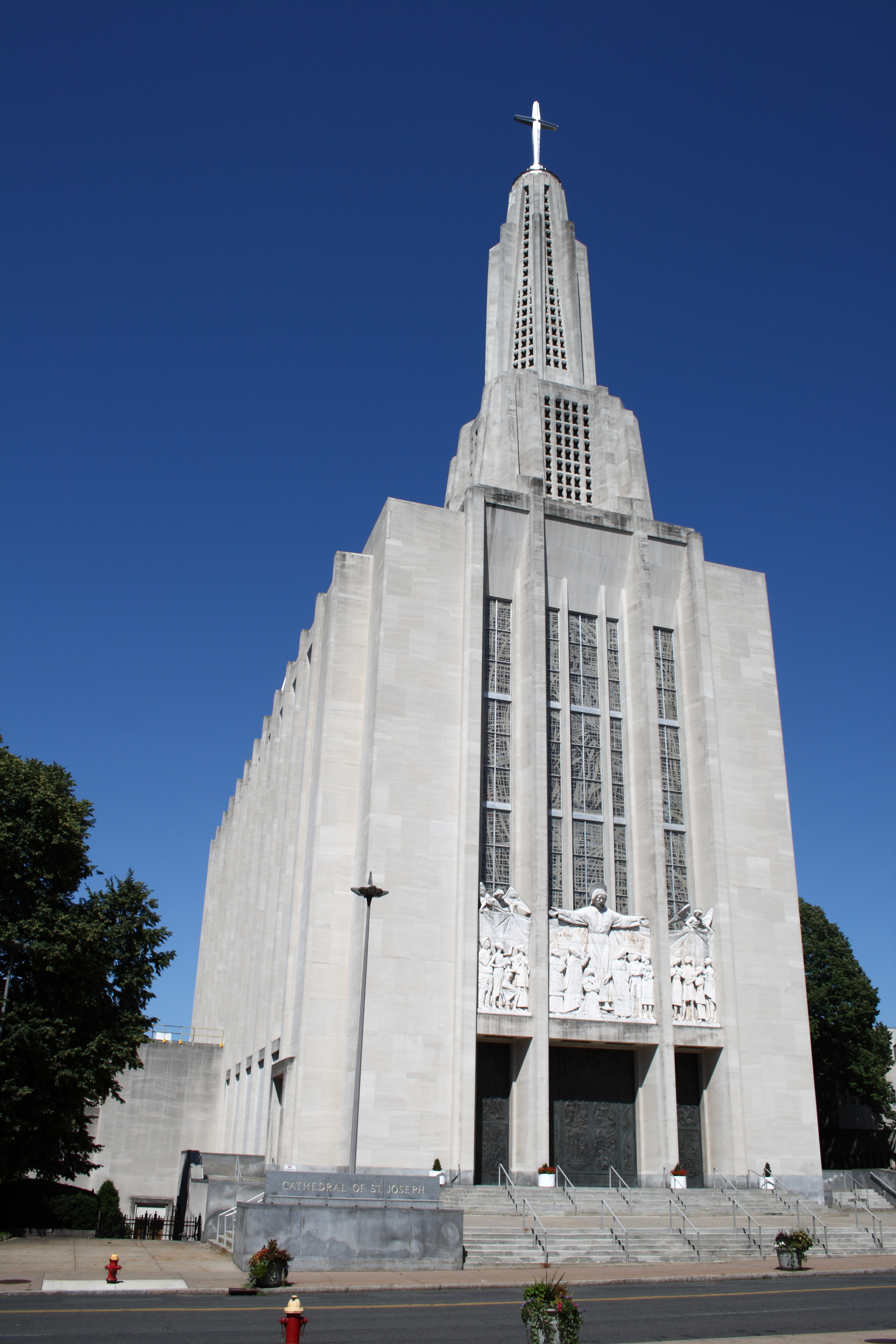
Cathedral of Saint Joseph

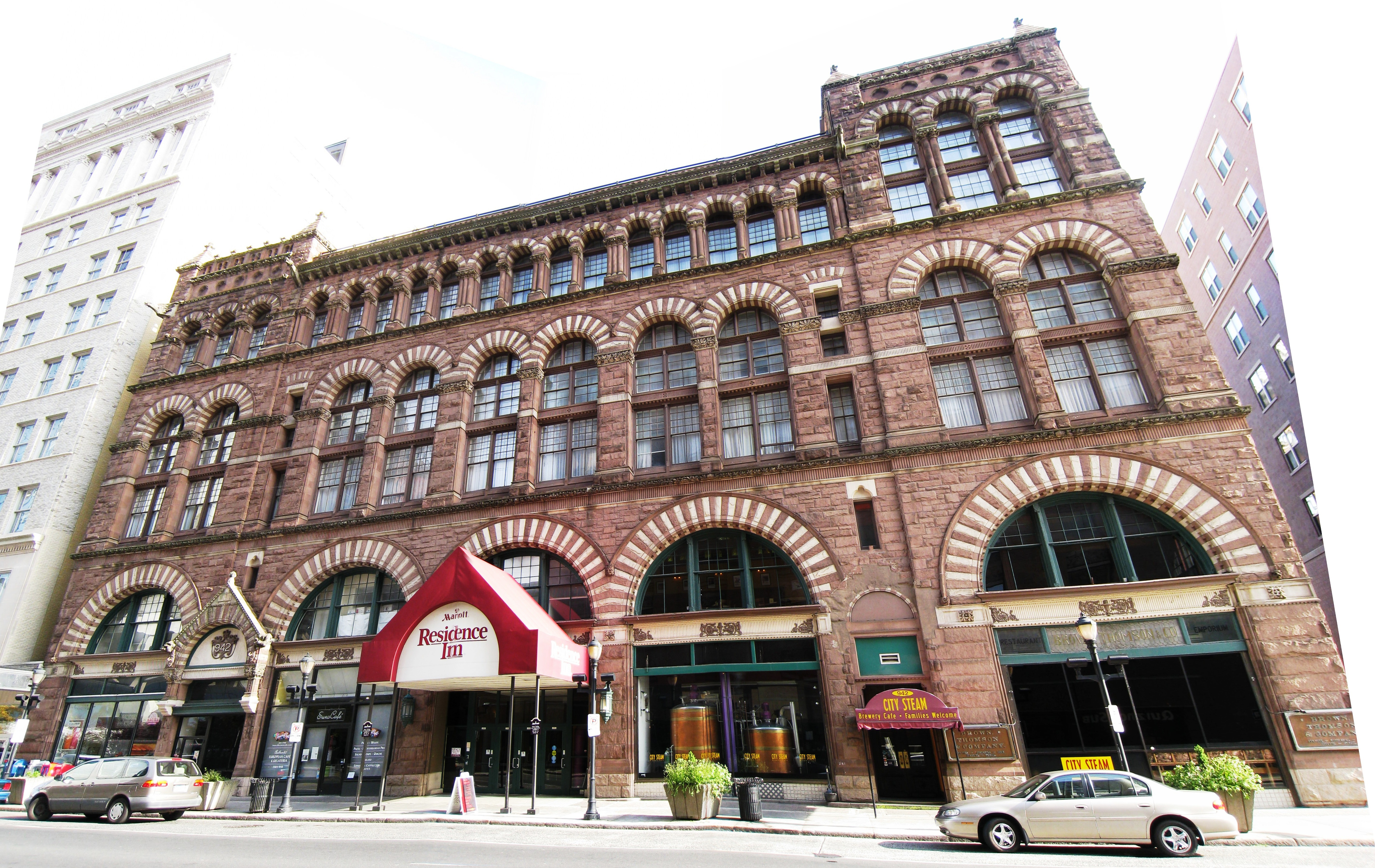
Cheney Building

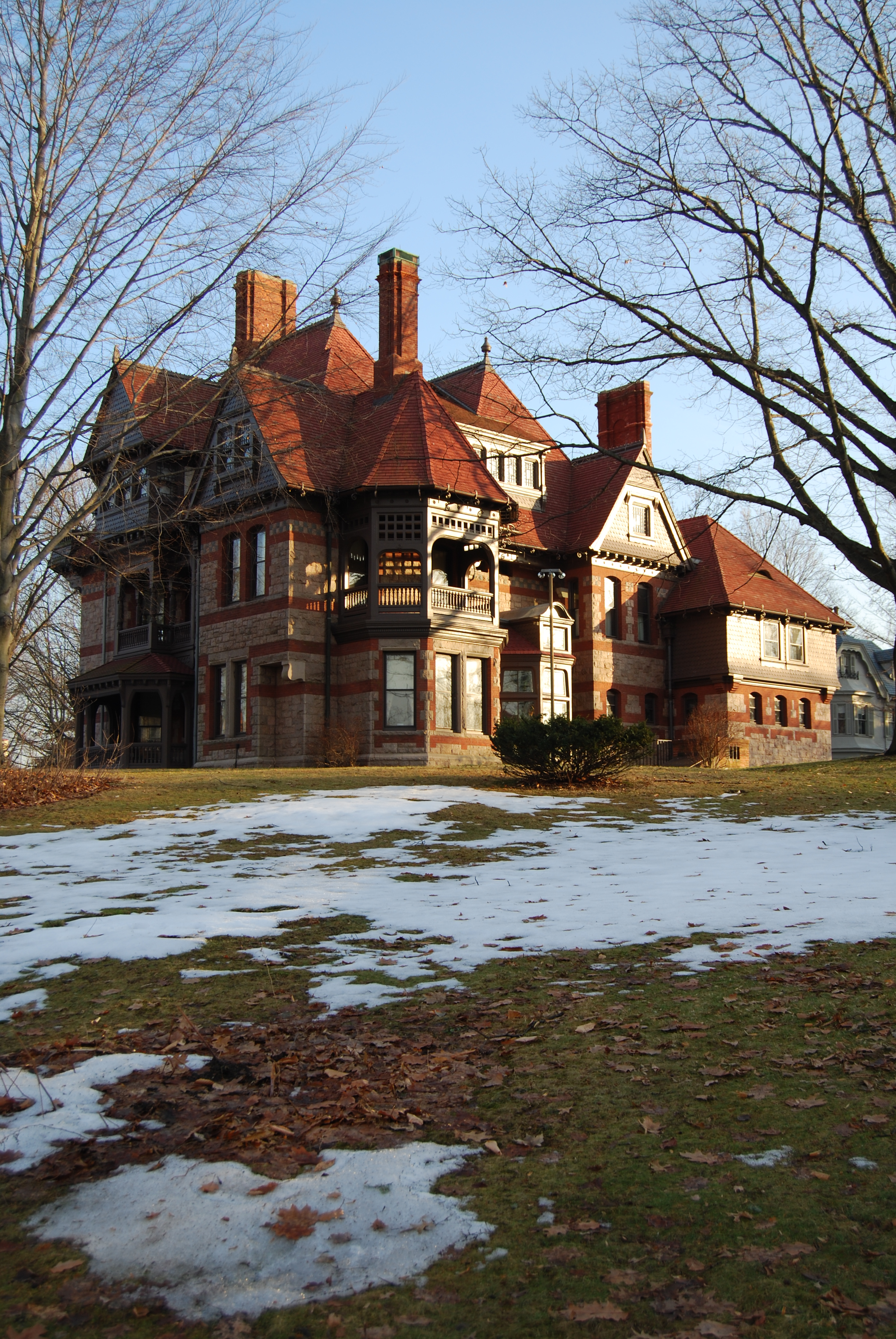
The house of Katherine Seymour Day, grandniece of Harriet Beecher Stowe, adjacent to the Stowe house; it now forms part of the research center dedicated to Stowe.

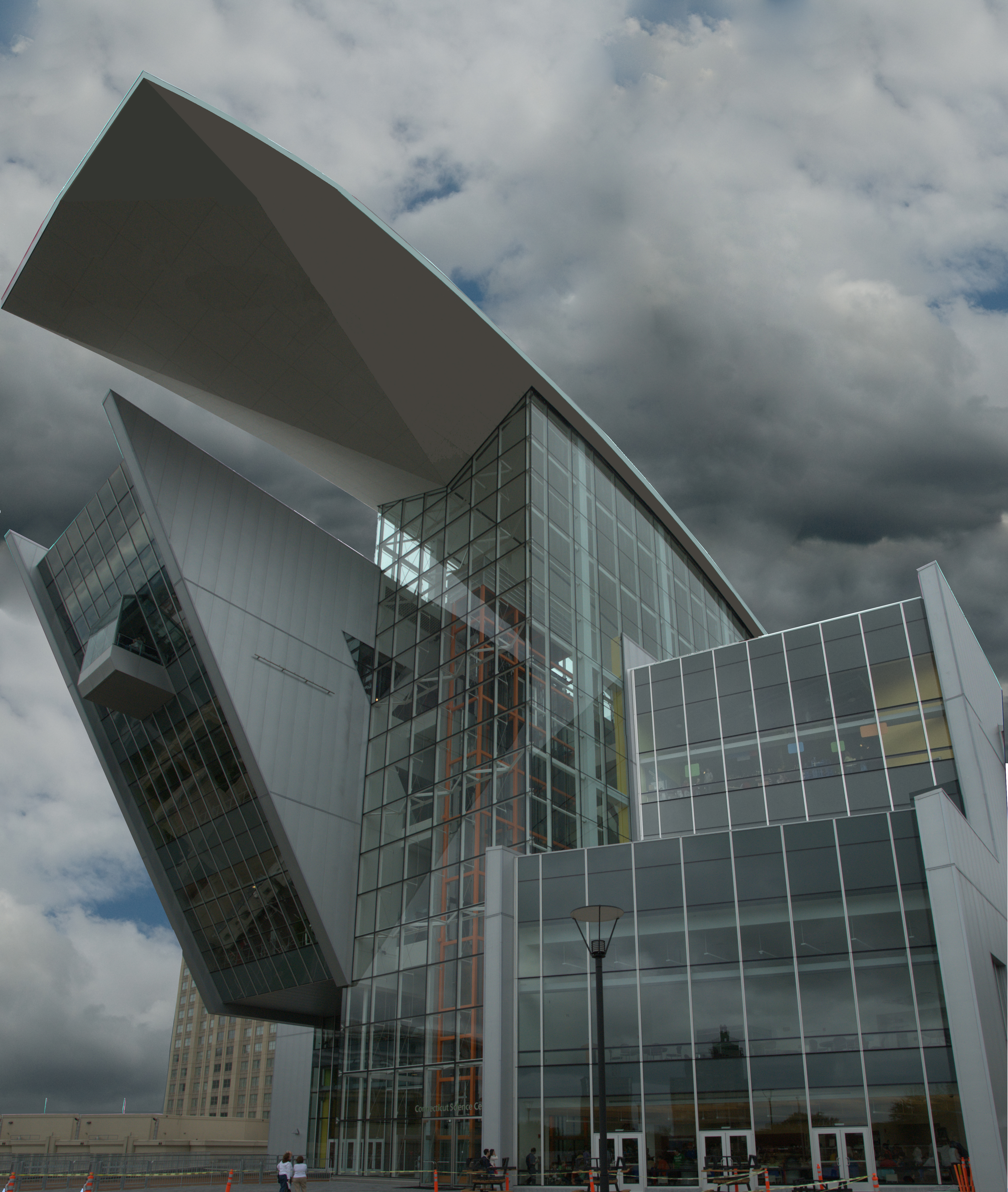
Connecticut Science Center on the Riverfront

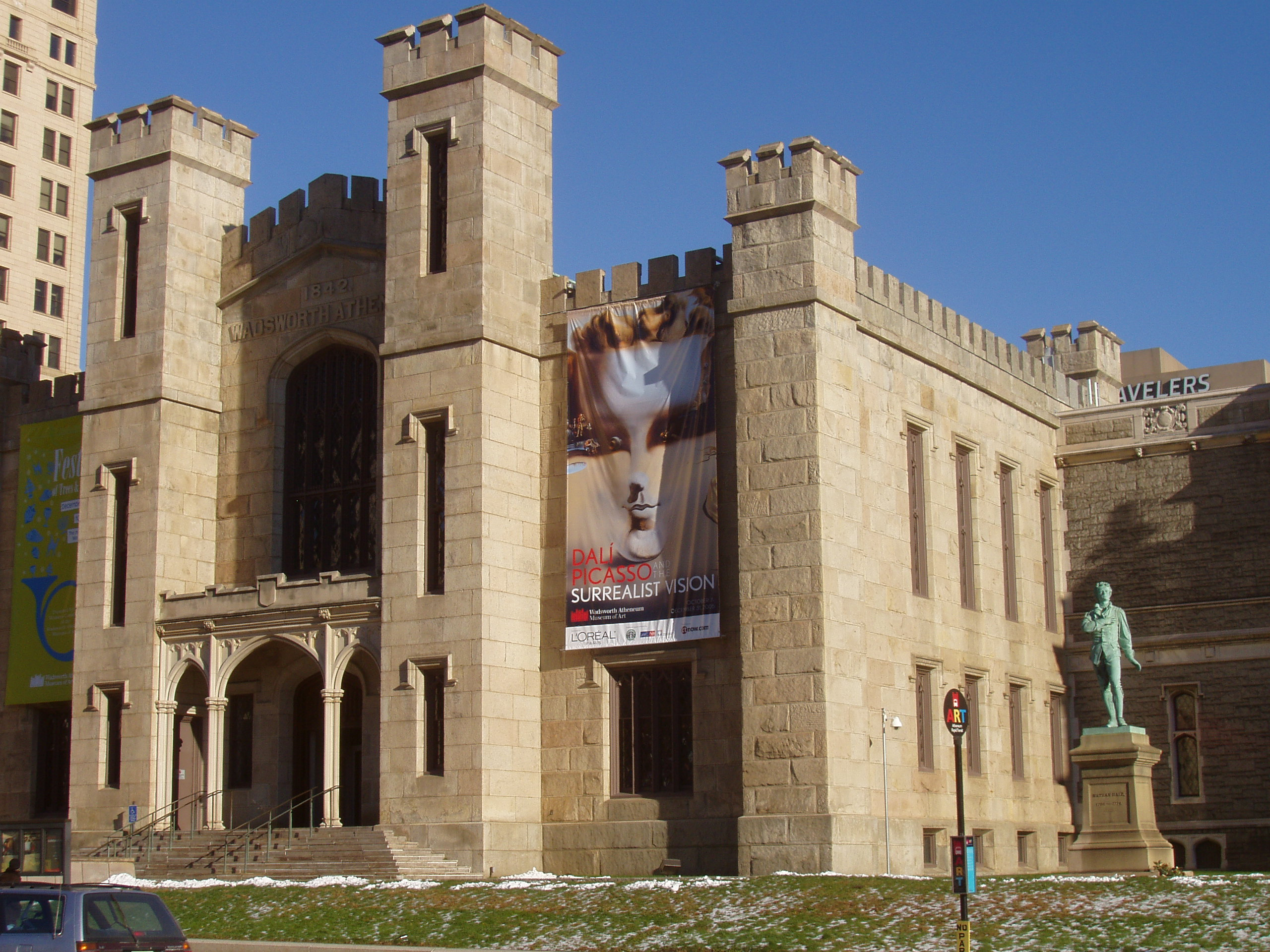
Wadsworth Atheneum

- Aetna building – Aetna building on Farmington Avenue is the world's largest Colonial Revival building, crowned by a tall Georgian tower inspired by the Old State House downtown.
- Ancient Burying Ground – The oldest historic site in Hartford and the city's first graveyard. Many of Hartford's renowned residents and founders are buried there.
- Armsmear – The Colt family estate.
- Bulkeley Bridge – A stone-arch bridge spanning the Connecticut River and connecting the city of Hartford with East Hartford.
- Bushnell Center for the Performing Arts – The theater was constructed in the 1930s by the same architects who designed New York City's Radio City Music Hall. It features a Georgian Revival exterior and an Art Deco interior, with a large hand-painted mural suspended from the ceiling that is the largest of its kind in the United States.
- Bushnell Park – This park is located below the State Capitol and legislative office complex and consists of lawn, sculpture, fountains, and a historic carousel. It is the first park in the country purchased by a municipality for public use, and it was designed by Jacob Weidenmann. The Soldiers & Sailors Civil War Memorial Arch frames the northern entrance to the park, the first triumphal arch in the United States.
- Cathedral of St. Joseph – This 281-foot (86 m) limestone Roman Catholic cathedral was built in 1961 to replace its predecessor lost to fire. It is located west of downtown along Farmington Avenue in the Asylum Hill neighborhood and has large Parisian stained glass windows, an 8,000 pipe organ, and the largest ceramic tile mural of Christ in Glory in the world.
- Center Church – The First Church of Christ in Hartford is located at 60 Gold Street and is also known as Center Church. It was founded by Thomas Hooker.
- Cheney Building – This building was designed in the late 19th century by H. H. Richardson. It is located downtown on Main Street and once housed the Brown, Thomson & Co. department store.
- Church of the Good Shepherd and Parish House - Commissioned by Elizabeth Jarvis Colt in 1866 and 1895, respectively, to commemorate her husband, Samuel Colt, and her son, Caldwell Hart Colt, and designed by Edward Tuckerman Potter. Both buildings are part of the Coltsville Historic District.
- City Place I – The tallest building in Connecticut at 38 stories, located at 185 Asylum Street.
- Colt Armory – The complex was once the main factory building of Colt's Manufacturing Company, topped with a blue and gold dome. It is currently being redeveloped and renovated and will feature apartments, retail space, and office space.
- Xfinity Theater (formerly the Meadows Music Theater) – An indoor/outdoor amphitheater-style performance venue located in the North Meadows.
- Connecticut Science Center – 154,000 square foot (14,000 m^{2}), nine-story, $165 million museum, designed by César Pelli and opened on June 12, 2009.
- Connecticut State Library – The building also contains the Museum of Connecticut History and a number of galleries devoted to Samuel Colt memorabilia, located in the hill district near the State Capitol atop Bushnell Park.
- Connecticut Convention Center – The 540,000 square foot (42,000 m^{2}) convention center is now open and overlooks the Connecticut River and the central business district. Attached to the center is a 409-room, 22-story Marriott Hotel. ConnectiCon is hosted every summer at the convention center.
- Connecticut Governor's Mansion – An imposing Georgian revival mansion situated near the highest point in the City of Hartford on upper Prospect Avenue.
- Connecticut Opera – Founded in 1942 and performing three fully staged operas per season, primarily at The Bushnell Center for the Performing Arts in Hartford.
- Connecticut State Capitol – This large Gothic-inspired building is located atop Bushnell Park and features many statues and engravings on its exterior. It is topped with a gold-leafed dome.
- Constitution Plaza – Constitution Plaza is a renowned and notorious redevelopment project built in the early 1960s. Hartford's historic Front Street neighborhood was razed to build the plaza. The complex is composed of numerous office buildings, underground parking, a restaurant, a broadcasting studio, and outdoor courtyards and fountains.
- Dunkin' Donuts Park – A baseball field that opened on April 13, 2017, as the home of the Hartford Yard Goats.
- Elizabeth Park & Rose Garden – A park straddling the border between Hartford and West Hartford.
- Harriet Beecher Stowe House & Research Center – The former home of Harriet Beecher Stowe located on Nook Farm in the Asylum Hill neighborhood on Farmington Avenue. It has become a museum along with its neighbor, the home of Mark Twain.
- The Hartford Financial Services Group headquarters campus on Asylum Hill occupies the former site of the American School for the Deaf, which has moved to a campus in West Hartford.
- Hartford Public Library – The Library was founded in 1774 and has over 500,000 holdings, an extensive calendar of programs, and free public access computers and Wi-Fi.
- Hartford Stage – Founded in 1963, this regional theatre company's productions have gone on to Broadway and have won several Tony Awards.
- Hartford Symphony Orchestra – Connecticut's regional orchestra.
- The Hartt School at the University of Hartford is recognized as one of the premiere performing arts conservatories in the United States.
- The Mark Twain House and Museum – The home was built by Samuel Clemens and his wife in 1874. They lived here 17 years, raising three daughters. This is where Mark Twain wrote many of his most popular books. The house is open year-round for tours, events, and author programs. It is located in Nook Farm, part of the Asylum Hill neighborhood on Farmington Avenue. National Geographic named it one of the ten best historic homes in the world.
- Old State House – The Old State House dates back to 1796, making it one of the nation's oldest. It was designed by Charles Bulfinch, who also designed the Massachusetts State House in Boston. It was recently restored with a gold-leafed dome and sits facing the Connecticut River in downtown. It was the site of the United States v. The Amistad trial.
- Phoenix Life Insurance Company Building – The first two-sided building in the world, located on Constitution Plaza and listed on the National Register of Historic Places.
- Polish National Home – Opened in 1930 to serve the Polish community that once dominated this part of Hartford, the building now serves as restaurant and banquet hall.
- Pope Park – Public park originally landscaped by the Olmsted Brothers.
- Real Art Ways – An alternative art gallery hosting contemporary art, music, and film productions.
- Soldiers and Sailors Memorial Arch – This brownstone memorial is located in Bushnell Park to honor the 4,000 Hartford citizens who served in the American Civil War, and the 400 who perished. It was the first triumphal arch in the United States.
- Trinity College – The liberal arts college was founded in 1823 and has more than 2,100 students. It is the second-oldest in Connecticut after Yale University in New Haven.
- Unitarian Meeting House (1964) – a modernist structure designed by Victor A. Lundy.
- University of Connecticut Hartford Campus – The downtown campus of the University of Connecticut, anchored on Prospect Street by the historic Beaux-Arts entrance of the former Hartford Times building.
- University of Connecticut School of Business – A branch of the University of Connecticut Business school operates in downtown Hartford on Market Street, north of Constitution Plaza.
- University of Connecticut School of Law – The campus is located off Farmington Avenue and features an extensive Gothic-inspired library.
- University of Hartford – The university was founded in 1877 and sits on 340 acres (140 ha) with a 13-acre (5.3 ha) campus on Bloomfield Avenue situated on land divided among Hartford, West Hartford, and Bloomfield in the Blue Hills neighborhood.
- Wadsworth Atheneum Museum of Art – The second oldest art museum in the U.S. (after the Pennsylvania Academy of the Fine Arts) is located on Main Street in downtown Hartford opposite the Travelers Tower. The museum features a significant collection of Italian Baroque old masters and post-impressionist modern art. Alexander Calder's Stegosaurus sculpture sits in a plaza between it and the Hartford Municipal Building.
- PeoplesBank Arena – The center hosts concerts and shows and is home to the Hartford Wolf Pack AHL hockey team and the Connecticut Huskies basketball team.

=== Parades ===
- Greater Hartford St. Patrick's Day Parade – Downtown – March – Run by The Central Connecticut Celtic Cultural Committee.
- Greater Hartford Puerto Rican Day Parade – Downtown, South Green, and Frog Hollow – June – Run by The Connecticut Institute for Community Development.
- Greater Hartford West Indian Parade – Northeast – August – Run by The West Indian Independence Celebrations since 1962.
- Hooker Day Parade – Downtown – May – Run by Hartford Business Improvement District.
- Connecticut Veterans Parade – Downtown – November – Run by The Ferris Group, LLC.

== Sports ==
Club	League	Sport	Venue	Founded	Titles
Hartford Yard Goats	Eastern League	Baseball	Dunkin' Donuts Park	1973	0
Hartford Wolf Pack	American Hockey League	Ice hockey	PeoplesBank Arena	1926	1
Hartford Athletic	USL Championship	Soccer	Trinity Health Stadium	2019	0
Hartford Wanderers	USA Rugby	Rugby union	Colt Park	1966	0
Hartford City FC	National Premier Soccer League	Soccer	Trinity Health Stadium	2015	0

The Hartford Wolf Pack of the American Hockey League plays ice hockey at the PeoplesBank Arena in downtown Hartford. The PeoplesBank Arena also hosts larger-profile games for both the men's and women's basketball teams of the UConn Huskies. Other UConn home games are played at Gampel Pavilion located on the university's main campus in Storrs, Connecticut. In addition, all UConn Men's Ice Hockey home games are played at the PeoplesBank Arena.

The Hartford Yard Goats, the Double-A affiliate of the Colorado Rockies, moved from New Britain to Hartford in 2017. The team currently plays at Dunkin' Donuts Park.

Hartford is home to a USL Championship division team, Hartford Athletic, which was founded in 2019 and currently plays in the 5,500-seat Trinity Health Stadium. Hartford is also home to another semi-pro soccer team, Hartford City FC, which is a member of the NPSL and also plays at Trinity Health Stadium.

=== Former teams ===
Club	League	Sport	Venue	Founded	Folded/Moved	Titles
New England/Hartford Whalers	World Hockey Association, National Hockey League	Hockey	Hartford Civic Center	1975	1997 (moved to North Carolina)	0
Hartford Dark Blues	National League	Baseball	Hartford Ball Club Grounds	1874	1876	0
Hartford Chiefs	Eastern League	Baseball	Bulkeley Stadium	1938	1952	0
Boston Celtics	National Basketball Association	Basketball	Hartford Civic Center	1975	1995 (part-time)	17
Hartford Hellcats/Connecticut Pride	Continental Basketball Association	Basketball	Hartford Civic Center	1993	2000	1
New England Blizzard	American Basketball League	Basketball	Hartford Civic Center	1996	1998	0
Hartford Blues	National Football League	Football	East Hartford Velodrome	1925	1927	0
Hartford Colonials	United Football League	Football	Rentschler Field	2010	2010	0
Connecticut Coyotes	Arena Football League	Football	Hartford Civic Center	1995	1996	0
New England Sea Wolves	Arena Football League	Football	Hartford Civic Center	1999	2000	0
Hartford Bicentennials	North American Soccer League	Soccer	Dillon Stadium	1975	1976	0
Hartford Hellions	Major Indoor Soccer League	Soccer	Hartford Civic Center	1979	1981	0
Hartford FoxForce	World TeamTennis	Tennis	State Arsenal and Armory	2000	2006	0

Hartford became the home of the WHA's New England Whalers in 1975 after the club moved from Boston, one of four WHA teams that joined the NHL in 1979. The city was home to the NHL's Hartford Whalers from 1979 to 1997, before the team relocated to Raleigh, North Carolina, and became the Carolina Hurricanes.

The Boston Celtics played a varying number of home games per year in Hartford from 1975 until 1995, when they opened the new TD Garden.

Hartford was also home to the Hartford Hellions of the Major Indoor Soccer League (MISL).

Hartford formerly had a National League baseball team, the Hartford Dark Blues, in the 1870s, and had an NFL team, the Hartford Blues, for three seasons in the 1920s.

Hartford briefly had a team in the UFL called the Hartford Colonials, but games were played in neighboring East Hartford's Rentschler Field.

From 2000 to 2006 Hartford was home to the Hartford FoxForce of World TeamTennis.

== Government ==
Like all cities in Connecticut except Groton, Hartford is legally a consolidated city-town; both the town and the city have been legally consolidated since 1896, though since 1784 the city's boundaries have been coextensive with those of the town.

Hartford is governed via the strong-mayor form of the mayor-council system. The current mayor is Arunan Arulampalam. Hartford voted in favor of restoring a mayor-council system in 2003, more than 50 years after establishing the council-manager form. Mayor Eddie Perez was first elected in 2001 and was re-elected with 76% of the vote in 2003. As the first strong mayor elected under the revised charter, he is widely credited with reducing crime, reforming the school system, and sparking economic revitalization in the city. Nonetheless, his reputation was hurt by accusations of corruption. The city council, formally known as the "Court of Common Council", has nine members.

In Connecticut, there is no county-level executive or legislative government. The state abolished county government in 1960, and since then counties have served as little more than boundaries for the state's probate, civil, and criminal courts. Connecticut municipalities provide nearly all local services such as fire and rescue, education, and snow removal.

Hartford passed an ordinance providing services to all residents regardless of their immigration in 2008. Said ordinance also prohibits police from detaining individuals based solely on their immigration status or inquiring as to their immigration status. In 2016, the ordinance was amended to declare that Hartford is a "Sanctuary city", although the term itself does not have an established legal meaning.

Hartford is a predominantly Democratic city and has voted for every presidential candidate in the party since Al Smith in 1928. In 2016, the city voted for Clinton 90%–8%, a slight shift from voting for Obama 93%–6% in the previous election. In 2020, Joe Biden won the city's vote by a margin of 87%–13%.

Hartford city vote by party in presidential elections
Year	Democratic	Republican	Third Parties
2024	81.78% 23,418	17.06% 4,884	1.16% 332
2020	86.6% 28,301	12.6% 4,116	0.8% 270
2016	90.22% 30,375	7.52% 2,531	2.26% 761
2012	93.24% 31,735	6.28% 2,138	0.48% 164
2008	91.75% 31,741	7.76% 2,686	0.49% 170
2004	79.64% 22,595	16.29% 4,623	4.07% 1,154
2000	80.22% 21,445	11.58% 3,095	8.20% 2,193
1996	82.92% 22,929	11.15% 3,082	5.94% 1,642
1992	73.30% 26,971	16.79% 6,180	9.91% 3,646
1988	76.08% 27,295	22.58% 8,100	1.35% 483
1984	71.17% 29,327	28.20% 11,621	0.63% 260
1980	69.75% 27,657	20.52% 8,138	9.73% 3,857
1976	72.02% 30,355	27.22% 11,473	0.76% 318
1972	66.45% 32,205	32.06% 15,535	1.49% 722
1968	71.27% 37,823	23.50% 12,468	5.23% 2,776
1964	83.36% 50,764	16.64% 10,132	0.00% 0
1960	72.03% 50,596	27.97% 19,647	0.00% 0
1956	54.79% 40,790	45.21% 33,657	0.00% 0
1952	60.22% 53,140	37.70% 33,273	2.08% 1,833
1948	63.94% 47,584	33.13% 24,653	2.93% 2,177
1944	66.76% 50,825	33.24% 25,295	0.00% 0
1940	65.03% 48,504	34.97% 26,079	0.00% 0
1936	70.54% 45,757	29.46% 19,107	0.00% 0
1932	58.19% 32,443	41.81% 23,315	0.00% 0
1928	55.40% 32,102	43.75% 25,351	0.86% 498

Voter registration and party enrollment as of October 31, 2024
Party	Active voters	Inactive voters	Total voters	Percentage
Democratic	37,996	594	38,590	58.97%
Republican	3,360	63	3,423	5.23%
Unaffiliated	22,574	421	22,995	35.14%
Minor parties	424	10	434	0.66%
Total	64,354	1,088	65,442	100%

=== City council ===
Members of the Hartford Court of Common Council
Name	Position	Took office	Term end date	Political affiliation
Shirley Surgeon	President	2020	2027	Democratic
Marilyn Rossetti	Majority Leader	2020 (Note: Previously served two terms ending in 2003)	2027	Democratic
Thomas Clarke II	Assistant Majority Leader	2016	2027	Democratic
Kelly Bilodeau	Councilmember	2024	2027	Democratic
Amilcar Hernandez	Councilmember	2023	2027	Democratic
Maly Rosado	Councilmember	2020	2027	Democratic
John Q. Gale	Councilmember	2015	2027	Hartford Party
Joshua Michtom	Councilmember	2020	2027	Working Families
Alex Thomas	Minority Leader	2024	2027	Working Families

== Education ==
=== Primary and secondary education ===
Hartford is served by the Hartford Public Schools. Hartford Public High School, the nation's second-oldest high school, is located in the Asylum Hill neighborhood of Hartford. The city is also home to Bulkeley High School on Wethersfield Avenue, Global Communications Academy on Greenfield Avenue, Weaver High School on Granby Street, and Sport Medical and Sciences Academy on Huyshope Avenue. In addition, Hartford contains The Learning Corridor, which is home to the Montessori Magnet School, Hartford Magnet Middle School, Greater Harford Academy of Math and Science, and the Greater Hartford Academy of the Arts. One of the technical high schools in the Connecticut Technical High School System, A.I. Prince Technical High School, also calls the city home. The Classical Magnet School is one of the many Hartford magnet schools. Hartford is also home to Watkinson School, a private coeducational day school, and Grace S. Webb School, a special education school. Catholic schools are administered by the Roman Catholic Archdiocese of Hartford.

The city's high school graduation rate reached 71 percent in 2013, according to the state Department of Education.

=== Colleges and universities ===
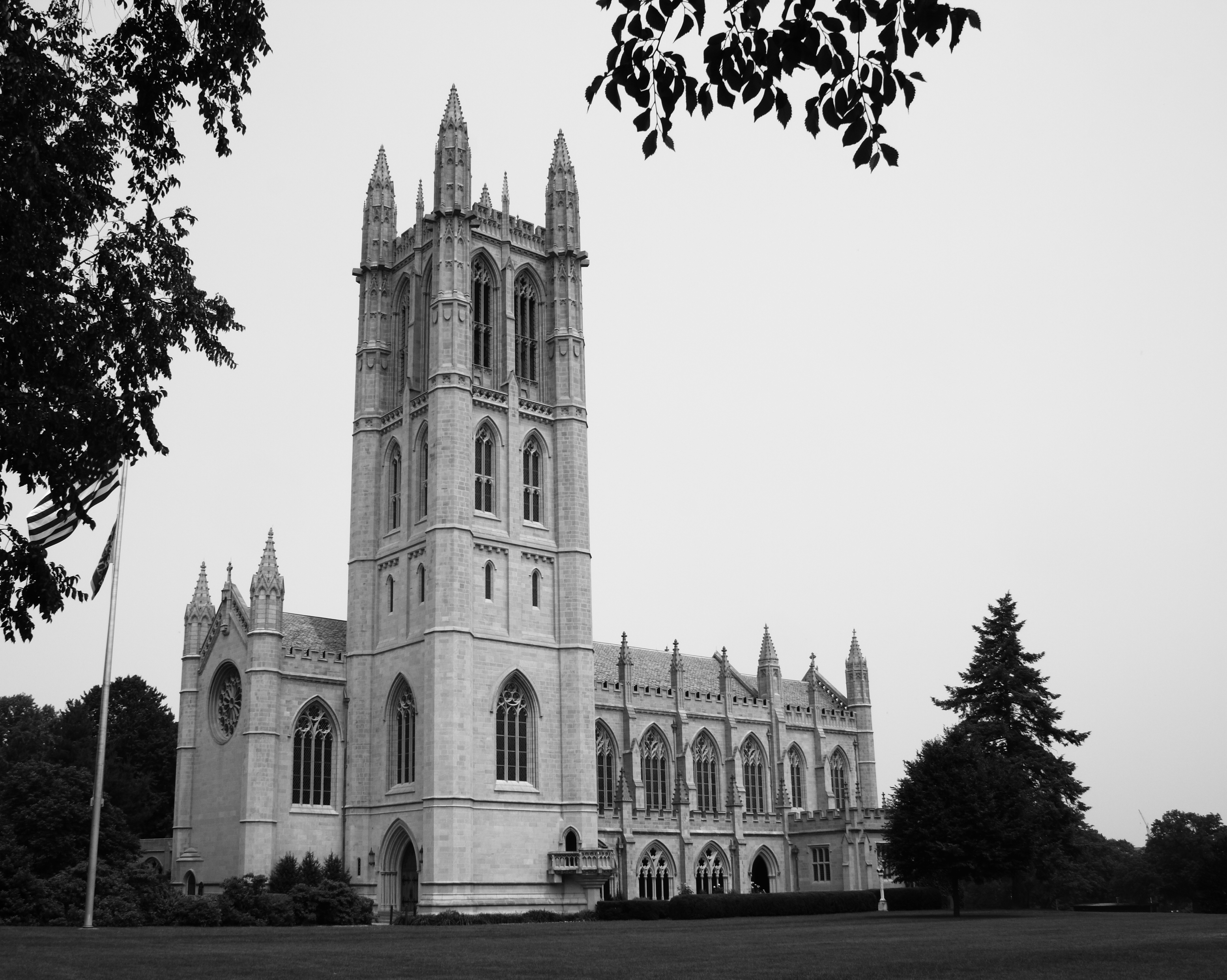
Trinity College Chapel

Hartford has several post-secondary institutions such as Trinity College, Capital Community College, the University of Connecticut's Hartford campus, the University of Connecticut School of Business, the Hartford Seminary, the University of Connecticut School of Law, and Rensselaer at Hartford (a branch campus of Rensselaer Polytechnic Institute). University of Saint Joseph opened its school of pharmacy in the downtown area in 2011.

The University of Hartford's cultural institutions include the Joseloff Gallery, the Renee Samuels Center, and the Mort and Irma Handel Performing Arts center. The "U of H" campus is co-located in the city's Blue Hills neighborhood and in neighboring towns West Hartford and Bloomfield.

== Media ==
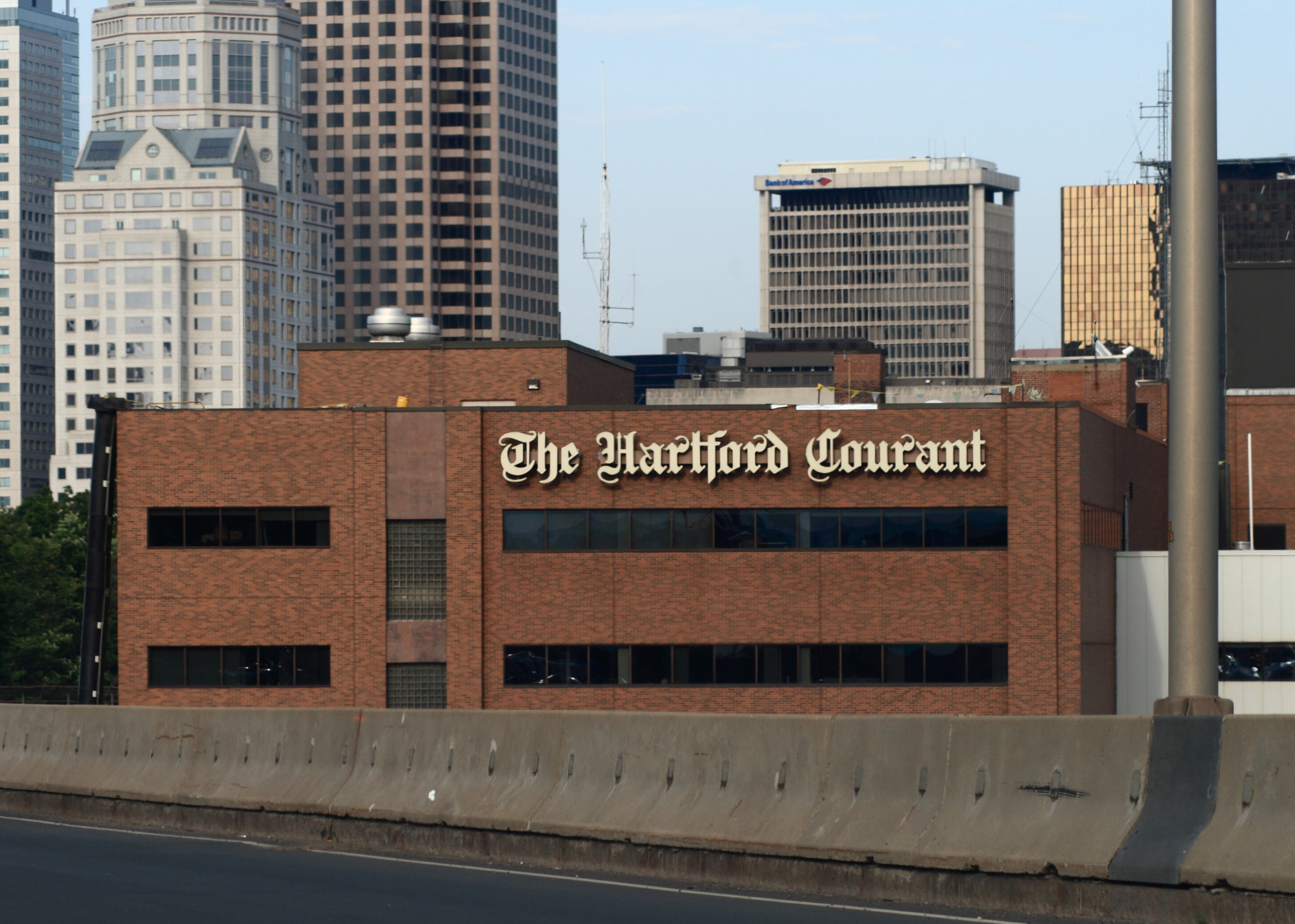
The Hartford Courant Co. building

The daily Hartford Courant newspaper is the country's oldest continuously published newspaper, founded in 1764. A weekly newspaper, owned by the same company that owns the Courant, the Hartford Advocate, also serves Hartford and the surrounding area, as do the Hartford Business Journal ("Greater Hartford's Business Weekly") and the weekly Hartford News.

The Hartford region is also served by several magazines. Among the local publications are: Hartford Magazine, a monthly lifestyle magazine serving Greater Hartford; CT Cottages & Gardens; Connecticut Business, a glossy monthly serving all of Connecticut; and Home Living CT, a home and garden magazine published five times a year and distributed statewide.

=== Broadcast media ===
Several radio stations are based in Hartford, including WDRC (AM), WDRC (FM), WHCN (FM), WJMJ (FM), WPOP (AM), WTIC (AM), WTIC (FM), and WPKT (FM, NPR).

Hartford's major television stations include WFSB 3 (CBS), WTNH 8 (ABC), WUVN 18 (Univision), WRDM-CD 19 (Telemundo O&O), WCCT-TV 20 (The CW), WHPX-TV (Ion Television O&O), WVIT 30 (NBC O&O), WHCT-LD 35 (MeTV O&O), WCTX 59 (MyNetworkTV) and WTIC-TV 61 (Fox). PBS member stations include WEDH 24 and WEDY 65 which are both part of the Connecticut Public Television (CPTV) network. These stations serve the Hartford/New Haven market, which is the 33rd largest media market in the U.S. as of 2020.

=== Film ===
- Must Read After My Death, a 2009 documentary film

== Infrastructure ==
=== Transportation ===
==== Highways ====
I-84, which runs from Scranton to I-90 in Sturbridge, just over the Massachusetts border, and I-91, which runs from New Haven along the Connecticut River ultimately to Canada, intersect in downtown Hartford. In addition to I-84 and I-91, two other highways service the city: Route 2, an expressway that runs from downtown Hartford to Westerly, passing through Norwich and past Foxwoods Resort Casino. The Wilbur Cross Highway portion of Route 15 that skirts the southeastern part of the city near Brainard Airport. A short connector known as the Conlin–Whitehead Highway also provides direct access from I-91 to the Capitol Area of downtown Hartford. The Main Street Bridge is a historic bridge on the highway.

Hartford experiences heavy traffic as a result of its substantial suburban population (nearly 10 times that of the actual city). As a result, thousands of people travel on area highways at the start and end of each workday. I-84 experiences traffic from Farmington through Hartford and into East Hartford and Manchester during the rush hour.

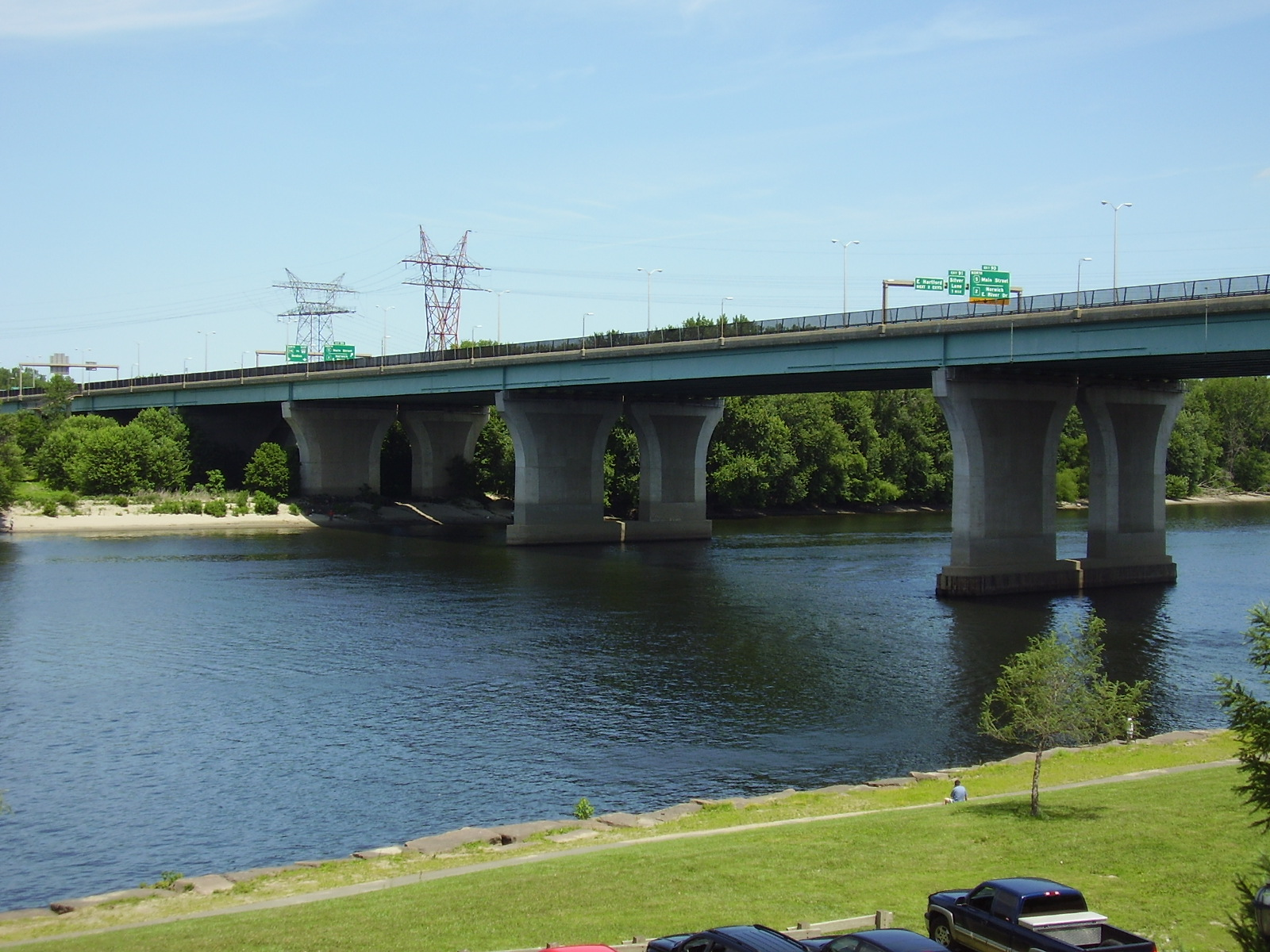
Charter Oak Bridge over the Connecticut River

Several major surface arteries also run through the city. Albany Avenue (Route 44) runs westward through the northern part of West Hartford to the Farmington Valley and the hills of northern Litchfield County and into New York, and eastward towards Putnam and into Rhode Island. Blue Hills Avenue (Route 187) runs north from Albany Avenue toward Bloomfield and East Granby. Main Street (Route 159) heads north through Windsor towards the western suburbs of Springfield, Massachusetts. Wethersfield Avenue (Route 99) heads south through Wethersfield towards Middletown. Maple Avenue heads south-southwest, becoming the Berlin Turnpike in Wethersfield and Newington. Farmington Avenue heads west through West Hartford Center and Farmington towards Torrington.

A large-scale project is being planned to rebuild the I-84 viaduct that cross through the city along with moving I-91 away from the Connecticut River.

==== Rail ====
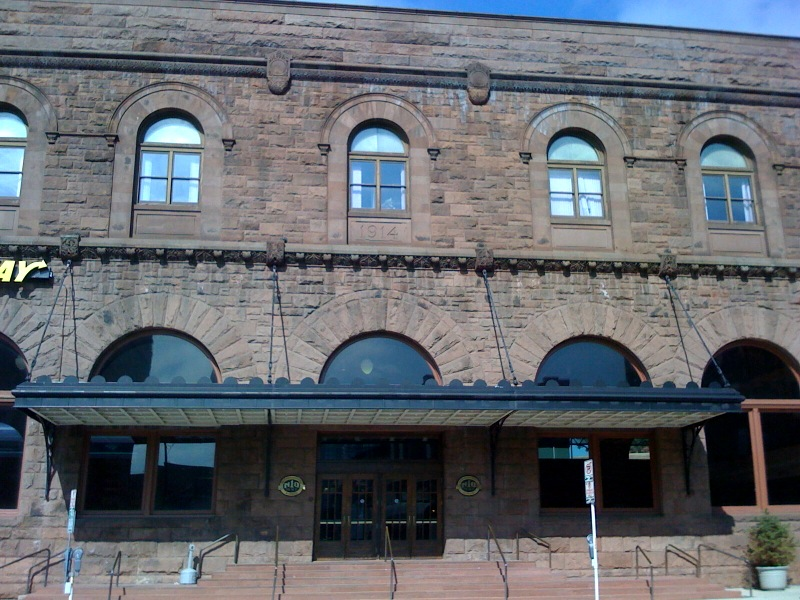
Hartford's Union Station

The city is served by the 1889 built Hartford Union Station. Amtrak provides service from Hartford to Vermont via Springfield and southward to New Haven. The station also serves numerous bus companies. Hartford Union Station is also served by the Hartford Line, a commuter rail service that runs between New Haven and Springfield and stops at stations in communities along Interstate 91. It uses the rail line owned by Amtrak. "CTrail" branded trains provide service along the corridor, and riders can use Hartford Line tickets to travel on board most Amtrak trains along the corridor at the same prices. The service launched on June 16, 2018.

==== Airports ====
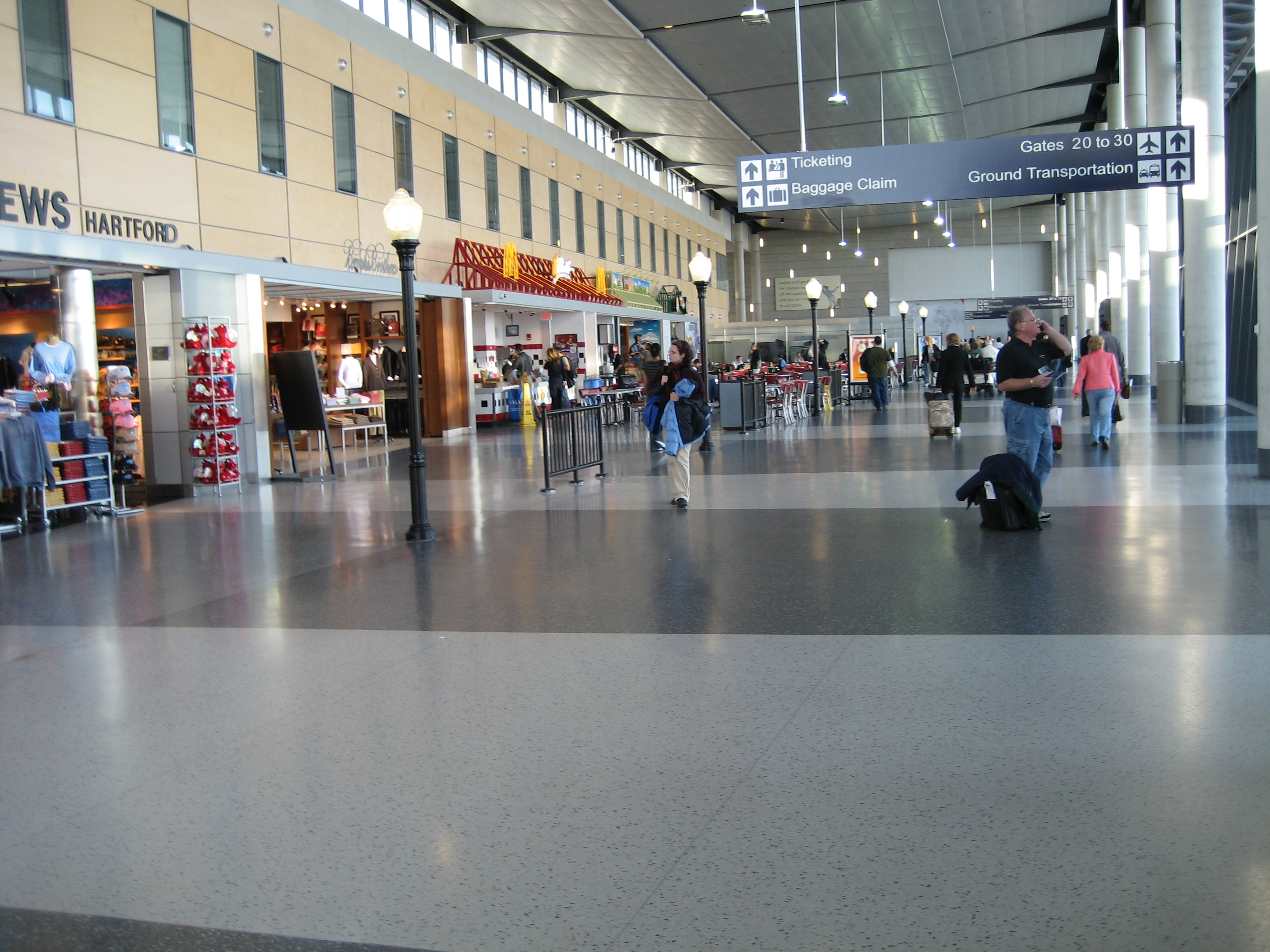
Bradley International Airport

Bradley International Airport (BDL) is located in Windsor Locks, Connecticut, and offers more than 150 daily departures to over 30 destinations on 9 airlines. It has 4 International flights daily. Connecticut Transit provides bus service between Bradley International Airport and downtown Hartford. Other airports serving the Hartford area include:

- Hartford-Brainard Airport (HFD), located in Hartford off I-91 and close to Wethersfield; serves charter and General Aviation flights
- Westover Metropolitan Airport (CEF), located in Chicopee, Massachusetts, 27 miles (43 km) north of Hartford; serves charter and military flights
- Logan International Airport (BOS), located in Boston, Massachusetts, offers 139 destinations, and is the closest option to Hartford for most International flights.
- Tweed New Haven Regional Airport (HVN), located in New Haven; is served by Avelo Airlines and Breeze Airways.

==== Bus ====
Connecticut Transit (CTtransit) is owned by the Connecticut Department of Transportation. The Hartford Division of CTtransit operates local and commuter bus service within the city and the surrounding area. Hartford's Downtown Area Shuttle (DASH) bus route is a free downtown circulator. All city buses are equipped with bike racks.

In March 2015, CTfastrak, Connecticut's first bus rapid transit system, opened, providing a separated right-of-way between Hartford and New Britain. In addition, express bus services travel from downtown Hartford and Waterbury, servicing intermediate suburban communities like Southington and Cheshire, providing reliable public transportation between these communities for the first time. CTfastrak consists of 10 stations along the dedicated New Britain to Hartford busway, as well as a downtown loop serving Union Station and other downtown landmarks. Amenities include high-level station platforms, on-board wi-fi, ticket machines for pre-boarding fare collection, and real-time arrival information at stations.

Interstate bus service is provided by Peter Pan Bus, Greyhound Bus and Megabus. Chinatown bus lines provide low-cost bus service between Hartford and their New York and Boston hubs. In addition, there are buses for connections to smaller cities in the state. The main bus station is located on the ground floor of the transport center at Hartford Union Station at One Union Place, serving Peter Pan Bus and Greyhound Bus customers. All Megabus arrivals and departures are at the corner of Columbus Boulevard and Talcott Street on the opposite side of downtown.

==== Bicycle ====
A bicycle route runs through the center of Hartford. This route is a small piece of the large eastern bicycle route – the East Coast Greenway (ECG). The 3,000-mile (4,800 km) ECG runs from Calais, Maine, to the Florida Keys. The route is intended to be off-road, but some sections are currently on-road. The section through Hartford is right through the middle of Bushnell Park.

There are designated bicycle lanes on several roads including Capitol Avenue, Zion Street, Scarborough Street, Whitney, and South Whitney.

=== Emergency services ===
==== Fire department ====
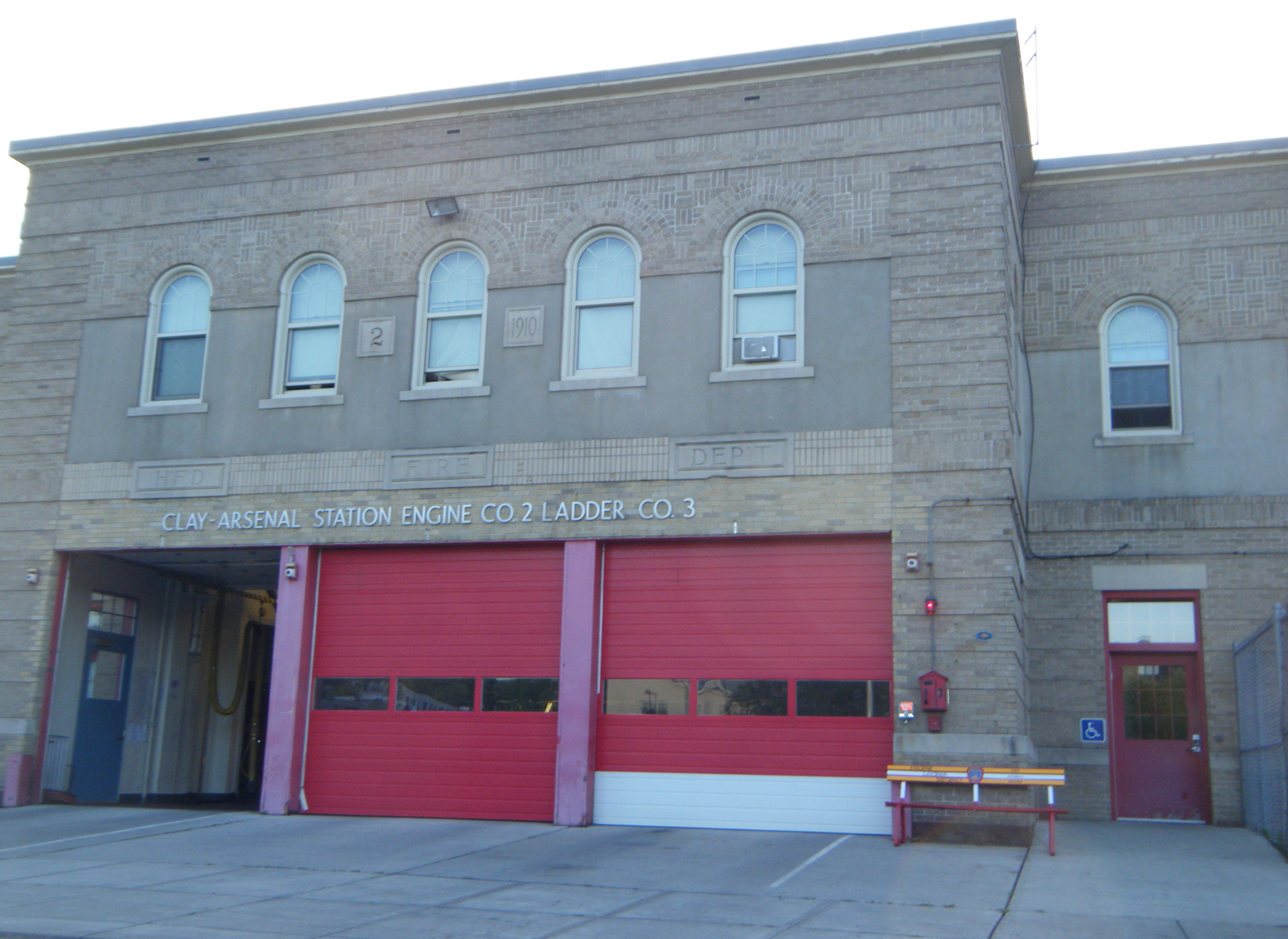
Fire station in Clay-Arsenal

The Hartford Fire Department is the fifth-largest fire department in Connecticut. The fire department operates out of 12 fire stations located throughout the city. Three of Hartford's fire stations are on the National Register of Historic Places. Engine 1 and Engine 15 are still in use today. The station for Engine 6, disbanded in 1984, has been repurposed as a homeless shelter.

==== Police department ====
The Hartford Police Department was founded in 1860, though the history of law enforcement in Hartford begins in 1636.

==== Emergency medical services ====
Hartford outsources ambulance services to private companies, including Aetna Ambulance in the South End and American Medical Response in the North End.

== Notable people ==
Hartford has been home to many historically significant people, such as dictionary author Noah Webster (1758–1843), American Sign Language creator Thomas Hopkins Gallaudet (1787–1851), .45 Colt inventor Sam Colt (1814–1862), Gallaudet University founder Edward Miner Gallaudet (1837–1917), and American financier and industrialist J.P. Morgan (1837–1913).

=== Visual and performing artists ===
A wide range of artists hail from Hartford.

==== Authors ====
Post US Civil War, the creation of Nook Farm brought many authors and related individuals to Hartford. For example, Mark Twain (1835–1910) moved there in 1874. Twain's next-door neighbor at Nook Farm was Harriet Beecher Stowe (1811–1896), and all the Beecher sisters lived there, including educator and publisher Catharine Beecher and feminist thinker Isabella Beecher Hooker. Poet Lydia Sigourney (1791–1865) was known as 'The Sweet singer of Hartford,' and poet Wallace Stevens (1879–1955), who was an insurance executive in the city. World War II correspondent Lyn Crost (1915–1997) lived there. More recently, Dominick Dunne (1925–2009), John Gregory Dunne (1932–2003), and Suzanne Collins (born 1962) have resided in Hartford.

==== Visual artists ====
Harlem Renaissance artist Laura Wheeler Waring was born and raised in Hartford, as was the architectural engraver Louis Orr.

==== Actors ====
Actors and others in the entertainment business from Hartford include Katharine Hepburn, Thomas Ian Griffith, Gary Merrill, Linda Evans, Eriq La Salle, Diane Venora, William Gillette, Grace Carney, and Charles Nelson Reilly, and TV producer and writer Norman Lear. Television show director Paul Stanley was born in Hartford. Marvel Comics artist George Tuska grew up in Hartford. Additionally, the fictional characters of Richard and Emily Gilmore were said to reside in Hartford on the Gilmore Girls.

==== Musicians ====
In the field of music, natives include singer Sophie Tucker (1884–1966), "last of the red-hot mamas." Others include:

- Rock and Roll Hall of Fame members Gene Pitney and Mike Carabello (of Santana)
- Mark McGrath
- bass guitarist Doug Wimbish of Living Colour
- Cindy Blackman (drummer for Lenny Kravitz and wife of Carlos Santana)
- jazz alto saxophonist Jackie McLean
- concert violinist Elmar Oliveira (born 1950)
- brothers Jeff Porcaro, Mike Porcaro, and Steve Porcaro (of the group Toto)

==== Architects ====
Frederick Law Olmsted (1822–1903), considered the father of the profession of Landscape architecture, was born in Hartford. Among his designs are New York's Central Park, 1893 Chicago World's Fair, and Asheville's Biltmore Estate. Other projects that Olmsted was involved in include the country's first and oldest coordinated system of public parks and parkways in Buffalo, New York; the country's oldest state park, the Niagara Reservation in Niagara Falls, New York; one of the first planned communities in the United States, Riverside, Illinois; Mount Royal Park in Montreal; the Emerald Necklace in Boston; Highland Park in Rochester, New York; Belle Isle Park in Detroit; the Grand Necklace of Parks in Milwaukee; and Cherokee Park and entire parks and parkway system in Louisville, Kentucky. Olmsted's nephew, Frederick E. Olmsted (1872–1925) was a pioneering forester who is credited helping to establish the National Forest system in the United States.

=== Scientists ===
Barbara McClintock (1902–1992), pioneering cytogeneticist was born in Hartford. She was awarded the 1983 Nobel Prize in Physiology or Medicine for the breakthrough discovery of genetic transposition. She is the only woman to receive an unshared Nobel Prize in the Medicine category.

Alexander Rich (1924–2015), biologist and biophysicist, was born in Hartford.

=== Athletes ===
Former Cleveland Browns head coach Eric Mangini is from Hartford. Former NHL player Craig Janney and current player Nick Bonino were born in Hartford. Other sports stars include NBA players Marcus Camby, Rick Mahorn, Johnny Egan, and Michael Adams, as well as NFL kicker John Carney, Dwight Freeney, Tebucky Jones, and Eugene Robinson.

=== Other notable figures ===
Martha Bulloch Roosevelt, mother of president Theodore Roosevelt and paternal grandmother of Eleanor Roosevelt, was born in Hartford on July 8, 1835.

Elizabeth May, leader of the Green Party of Canada (2006–2019 & 2022–2026) and member of the House of Commons for Saanich—Gulf Islands (since 2011).

== Recent developments ==
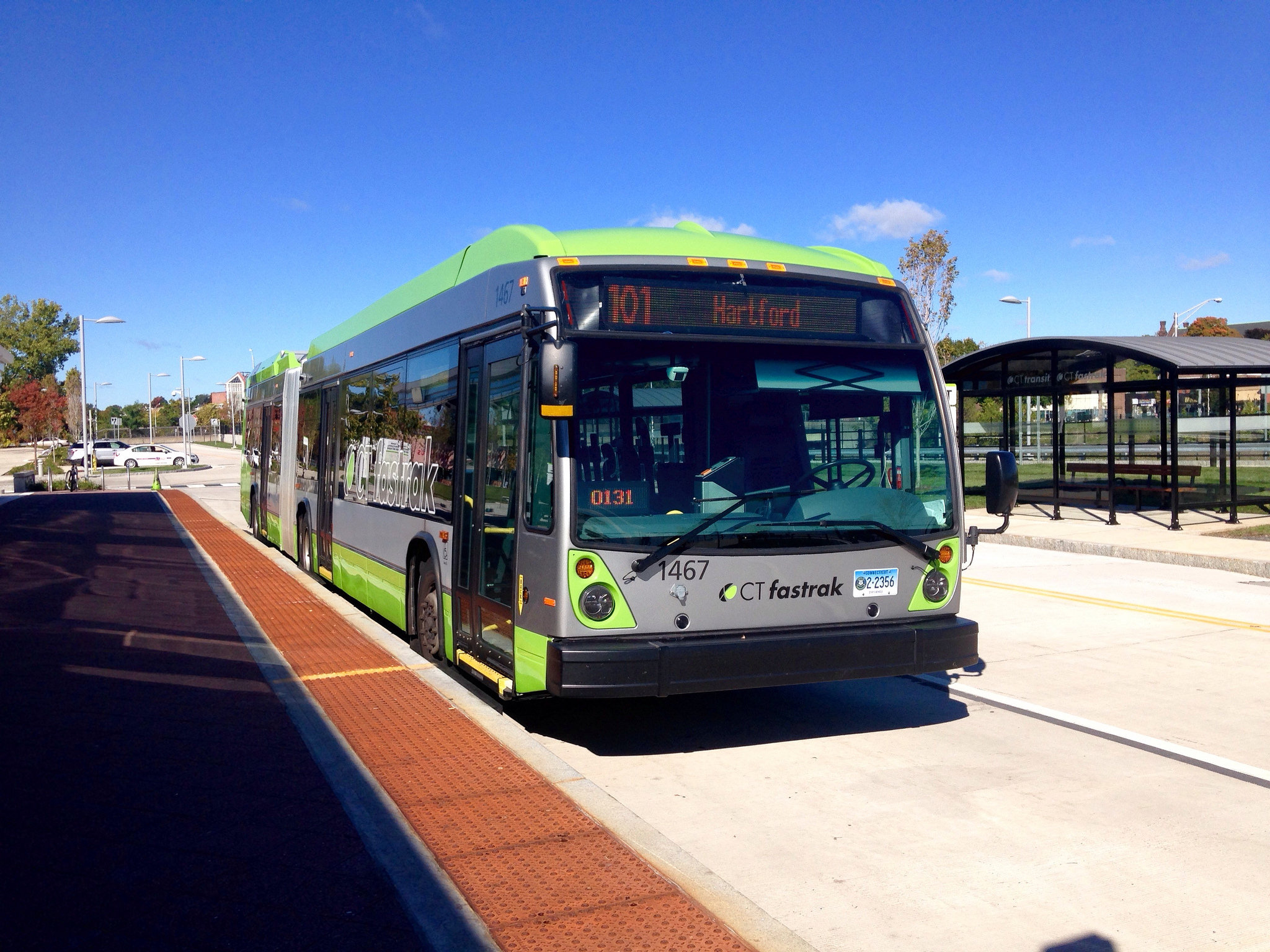
CTfastrak was built to connect the suburbs to Hartford.

- Adriaen's Landing – The state and privately funded project is situated on the banks of the Connecticut River along Columbus Boulevard, and connects to Constitution Plaza. Constitution Plaza forced hundreds of households to relocate when it was built a few decades ago. The latest project includes the 540,000-square-foot (50,000 m^{2}) Connecticut Convention Center, which opened in June 2005 and is the largest meeting space between New York City and Boston. Attached to the Convention Center is the 22-story, 409-room Marriott Hartford Hotel-Downtown, which opened in August 2005. Being constructed next to the convention center and hotel is the 140,000-square-foot (13,000 m^{2}) Connecticut Science Center.
- Capital Community College at the 11-story G. Fox Department Store Building – The 913,000-square-foot (84,800 m^{2}) former home of the G. Fox & Company Department Store on Main Street has been renovated and made the new home of Capital Community College as well as offices for the State of Connecticut and ground level retail space. Capital Community College helps train (mostly) adult students in specific career fields. On Thursdays, vendors sell crafts on the Main Street level. Two music clubs, Mezzanine and Room 960, are housed in the building.
- CTfastrak – The recently completed bus rapid transit system connects Hartford's Union Station to downtown New Britain. It was built to ease traffic on I-84.
- Front Street – The final component of Adriaen's Landing, Front Street, sits across from the Convention Center and covers the land between Columbus Boulevard and The Hartford Times Building. The Front Street development combines retail, entertainment and residential components. Publicly funded parts of the project will include transportation improvements. There have been significant delays in the Front Street project, and the first developer was removed from the project because of lack of progress. The city has chosen a new developer, but work is yet to begin on the retail and residential component of Front Street. The city and state may soon take action to increase the speed with which the project enters implementation phases. There has been talk of bringing an ESPN Zone to the Front Street (ESPN is headquartered in nearby Bristol). On the back side of Front Street, the historic Beaux-Arts Hartford Times Building is being converted into a downtown campus of the University of Connecticut.
- Hartford Line – According to Connecticut Governor Malloy, the Hartford Line commuter rail service will reach speeds up to 110 mph (177 km/h). The rail line is intended to unite the densely populated, 61 mi or 98 km region between Hartford, Springfield, and New Haven; ease the frequently congested Interstate 91 automobile highway; and increase mobility in a region that is now almost entirely dependent upon automobile ownership. As of May 2011, Connecticut's portion of the commuter line has been three-quarters funded. Currently, the state is seeking the $227 million necessary to complete the northern portion of the line from the $2.4 billion in federal funds that Florida rejected to fund its own high-speed rail project.
- Knowledge Corridor Partnership – In 2000, at The Big E in West Springfield, Massachusetts, Hartford and Springfield, Massachusetts – the two major New England, Connecticut River Valley cities with centers only 24 mi or 39 km) apart – jointly announced the Knowledge Corridor Partnership. The Knowledge Corridor Partnership aims to unite the two metropolitan areas economically, culturally, and geographically. The nickname comes from the metropolitan region's over 32 universities and liberal arts colleges, including several of the United States' most prestigious. As of the 10th anniversary of the Knowledge Corridor, it was announced that the Knowledge Corridor is beginning to receive federal funds, as opposed to either state or city funds.

== Sister cities ==
Hartford's sister cities are:

- Caguas, Puerto Rico
- Dongguan, China
- Floridia, Italy
- Huế, Vietnam
- Morant Bay, Jamaica
- New Ross, Ireland
- Ocotal, Nicaragua
- Sogakope, Ghana
- Thessaloniki, Greece
- Hertford, England

== See also ==
- Hartford Electric Light Company
- List of cities in Connecticut
