= KVOF-TV =

Television station in San Francisco (1968–1985)

- San Francisco, California; United States
- Channels: Analog: 38 (UHF)

Ownership
- Owner: Gene Scott; (Faith Center)

History
- First air date: December 28, 1968
- Last air date: December 1985
- Call sign meaning: "King's Voice of Faith"

Technical information
- ERP: 2,584 kW
- HAAT: 399 m (1,310 ft)
- Transmitter coordinates: 37°41′15″N 122°26′04″W

KVOF-TV (channel 38) was a television station in San Francisco, California, United States, which broadcast from 1968 to 1985. It was last owned by the Faith Broadcasting Network, controlled by pastor W. Eugene Scott, and was one of three television stations he owned; prior to its existence as a Christian station, it was built as independent station KUDO before going bankrupt in 1971 and being off the air for more than three years. It broadcast from San Bruno Mountain.

KVOF-TV's license renewal was dismissed in 1983 for failure to answer requests for documents in a comparative hearing that started when three other groups had already filed their own proposals for channel 38; this took place after other proceedings involving misuse of funds by Faith Center led to the dismissal of the license of Faith's other California station, KHOF-TV (channel 30) in San Bernardino. The station finally closed in late 1985, and a new channel 38 station, KWBB (now KCNS), began in 1986.

== KUDO ==
After filing in August 1965, the Bay Broadcasting Company received a construction permit for a new television station on San Francisco's channel 38 in April 1968, beating out an application by Reporter Broadcasting Company. Reporter Broadcasting, affiliated with The Sun-Reporter and owned by Carlton Benjamin Goodlett and other local stockholders, proposed a television station geared to San Francisco's minority communities; Bay, led by KGO-TV sports editor Bud Foster, had lengthy experience in local radio and television.

From studios at 760 Harrison Street, KUDO made its debut on Bay Area screens on December 28, 1968, which made it the last of four different UHF station debuts and relaunches in San Francisco in the same year. The inaugural telecast featured Carol Doda dressed as Father Time; she would have been Santa Claus if rain had not delayed channel 38's sign-on by a week. Foster took a different approach to programming channel 38 than would have been typical of an independent station. Instead of relying on reruns or movies, the station aired a variety of local programs, including a Saturday show known as On the Town that would go live to local events. One sports talk program was hosted by Willie Mays. Oakland Seals hockey games also aired on the new station, as did daily stock market coverage.

Watching KUDO, the new UHF station, can give you the sensation of owning your private television station—because, when you are tuned in, you often get the feeling that probably nobody else is watching.

— Oakland Tribune television columnist Bob MacKenzie

However, audiences and revenue failed to accrue to KUDO. It lost $1 million in its first three months of operation; in an April 1969 article panning the results of San Francisco's UHF boom, San Francisco Examiner columnist Dwight Newton called it a "mistake" and a "ghastly failure". In January 1970, Mays sued channel 38, alleging he had been paid just $8,700 of what was to be a two-year, $85,000 contract and that he was not even paid residuals for reruns.

The end for KUDO came on April 15, 1971, when it was adjudicated bankrupt and went dark. By this time, it had cut back its broadcast activities to the stock market program and weekend output. A public auction was held on June 26 to sell over $100,000 of equipment and office furniture. The license was assigned that August to bankruptcy trustee John M. England.

== KVOF-TV ==
In May 1973, the Federal Communications Commission (FCC) approved the sale of KUDO to Faith Center, the organization of pastor W. Eugene Scott, for $10,200. The station remained off the air for another year, during which time the call letters were changed to KVOF on March 22, 1974, and resumed on August 1 of that year with tests ahead of a September launch. KVOF-TV would primarily broadcast recorded programs from Faith Center in Glendale; in Southern California, the organization owned KHOF-TV in San Bernardino and KHOF (99.5 FM) in Los Angeles, in addition to WHCT-TV in Hartford, Connecticut. The television stations formed the Faith Broadcasting Network. Through the use of a microwave link from Faith Center to Oat Mountain and the use of a cable television relay that ended next to the channel 38 transmitter site, KHOF-TV was interconnected with KVOF-TV.

While a group challenged KVOF-TV's license along with those of several other Bay Area stations over poor children's programming in 1977, and gay rights groups had demanded equal time because channel 38 aired programs by Anita Bryant, it was an FCC probe into Faith Center's financial dealings that ultimately brought its California television stations to their doom. In 1978, the FCC began investigating charges that KHOF-TV in San Bernardino solicited funds from viewers but did not use them for the purposes that were stated; Faith Center refused to turn over financial documents, calling the exercise an "illegal fishing expedition" and claiming that it violated separation of church and state. In March 1980, administrative law judge Edward Luton found against KHOF-TV and ruled that that station's license should not be renewed. The ruling called into question Faith Center's character qualifications to be a licensee and put the other broadcast outlets at risk, especially the California stations that also had pending license renewals. The group made an effort to relieve its burden by attempting a distress sale to a minority group, the Television Corporation of Hartford (also known as Hispanic-American Communications), for $15 million. This was denied by the FCC as premature for KVOF-TV and WHCT-TV and too late for KHOF-TV.

In denying the distress sale, the FCC opted to accept competing applications for a new channel 38 television station. In June 1982, the FCC designated the KVOF-TV renewal application, filed in 1980, for comparative hearing opposite three bids from West Coast United Broadcasting Company, Together Media Ministries (owned by the First Assembly of God of Fremont), and Carmel-based LDA Communications, which all sought channel 38; this proceeding in turn depended on the renewal for the radio station. Administrative law judge Edward Kuhlmann dismissed KVOF-TV's renewal application in 1983 for failure to answer questions and produce documents that were necessary for the hearing. The initial decision that December gave the nod to West Coast United Broadcasting Company, whose Tacoma, Washington-based staff presented a superior proposal on integration of staff and management. Faith Center appealed, but the FCC denied this in 1984 and gave the church 90 days to continue running KVOF-TV in order to wind up its affairs. Faith Center then attempted to have the Supreme Court of the United States hear a challenge to its losses; it refused.

KVOF-TV was given until January 2, 1986, to close. Scott warned viewers of his San Francisco successor, "Here comes the Tower of Babel religious brigade ... the voices like Oral Roberts, Jimmy Swaggart and Jerry Falwell preaching homosexuals into hell and beating the drum with the same claptrap you hear Sunday on every religious station in the country". KWBB began operation in January 1986, featuring secular and religious programs—including Scott, who purchased four hours every night. The airtime sale, which at the very outset was for 24-hour-a-day programming, was part of a deal that granted West Coast United use of the previous KVOF-TV studio facilities.
