= WUVN =

Television station in Hartford, Connecticut

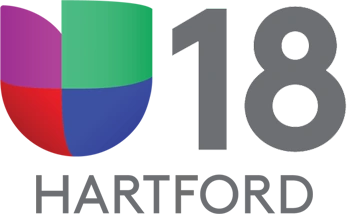
- Hartford, Connecticut; United States
- Channels: Digital: 22 (UHF), shared with WUTH-CD; Virtual: 18
- Branding: Univision 18; Noticias Nueva Inglaterra

Programming
- Affiliations: 18.1: Univision; 18.4: LATV

Ownership
- Owner: Entravision Communications; (Entravision Holdings, LLC)
- Sister stations: WUTH-CD

History
- First air date: September 25, 1954
- Former call signs: WGTH-TV (1954–1956); WHCT (1956–1972); WHCT-TV (1972–2001)
- Former channel numbers: Analog: 18 (UHF, 1954–2009); Digital: 46 (UHF, 2002–2018), 47 (UHF, 2018–2019)
- Former affiliations: ABC and DuMont (1954–1955); CBS (1955–1958); Independent (1958–1972, 1985–1991); Faith Broadcasting Network (1972–1985); Dark (1985, 1991–1997); inTV (1997–1998); Shop at Home (1998–1999); ValueVision (1999–2001)
- Call sign meaning: Univision

Technical information
- Licensing authority: FCC
- Facility ID: 3072
- ERP: 15 kW
- HAAT: 164.2 m (539 ft)
- Transmitter coordinates: 41°42′30″N 72°28′32″W

Links
- Public license information: Public file; LMS
- Website: noticiasnuevainglaterra.com

Semi-satellite
- WHTX-LD
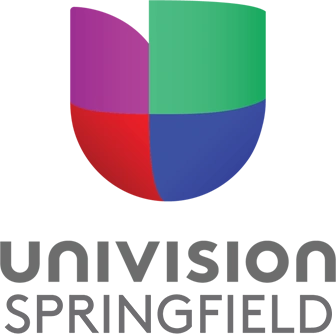
- Springfield–Holyoke, Massachusetts
- City: Springfield, Massachusetts
- Channels: Digital: 24 (UHF); Virtual: 43
- Branding: Univision Springfield

Programming
- Affiliations: 43.1: Univision

History
- First air date: February 1997
- Former call signs: W10CG (1992–1997); WHTX-LP (1997–2015)
- Former channel numbers: Analog: 10 (VHF, 1997–2003), 43 (UHF, 2003–2015); Digital: 43 (UHF, 2015–2019)
- Former affiliations: America One (1997–1998); AIN (1997–1998); Dark (1998–2003, 2009–2015)

Technical information
- Facility ID: 26337
- Class: LD
- ERP: 15 kW
- HAAT: 125.32 m (411 ft)
- Transmitter coordinates: 42°5′1.3″N 72°42′14.3″W

Links
- Public license information: LMS

WUVN (channel 18) is a television station in Hartford, Connecticut, United States, affiliated with the Spanish-language network Univision. It is owned by Entravision Communications alongside low-power UniMás affiliate WUTH-CD (channel 47). The two stations share studios at Constitution Plaza in downtown Hartford and transmitter facilities on Birch Mountain Road in Glastonbury, Connecticut. WUVN's Univision programming is also broadcast on WHTX-LD (channel 43) in Springfield, Massachusetts, from a transmitter on Provin Mountain in Agawam.

Channel 18 is Hartford's oldest television station. It began broadcasting on September 25, 1954, as WGTH-TV, a joint venture of The Hartford Times newspaper and General Tele-Radio. The station was an affiliate of ABC and the DuMont Television Network and operated from studios on Asylum Street. As with many ultra high frequency (UHF) stations of its day, it was at an economic disadvantage to very high frequency (VHF) stations; however, Hartford's VHF channel 3 was tied up in hearings. In 1955, CBS announced its intention to purchase channel 18; the station became a CBS affiliate later that year, and the deal closed in September 1956, at which time the call letters were changed to WHCT. Two years later, CBS—citing potential injury to the network if it did not do so—opted to close down WHCT and affiliate with the VHF station, WTIC-TV (channel 3). The station was off the air for two months before returning as an independent station in 1959.

In 1960, RKO General acquired WHCT, primarily for use as a test bed for subscription television technology, then hotly debated nationally. From June 1962 to January 1969, WHCT was the nation's first subscription TV station. It offered commercial programming receivable on all sets during the day; at night, it presented scrambled programs, including movies and sporting events, only receivable with decoders in the homes of paying customers. RKO General used the Phonevision system by Zenith Radio Corporation; when the Federal Communications Commission (FCC) authorized pay TV nationally, it stipulated that the programs offered were in color, which Phonevision could not do. RKO General ceased the subscription programming and ran channel 18 as a full-time commercial independent. It investigated a power increase but ran into the issue that a high-power WHCT would overlap impermissibly with the stations it owned in New York and Boston. RKO General attempted to sell the station but found no takers.

As a result, RKO donated the station to Faith Center, a California Christian church and television ministry. Faith Center investigated changes but ran into opposition from neighbors to new tower construction as well as its own financial difficulties. After Gene Scott became the pastor of Faith Center, the church took a hardline stance that it should not have to pay taxes, even though it was not tax-exempt; its refusal to pay taxes led to the temporary seizure of its transmitter site on two occasions. Under Scott's administration, the station's equipment and capabilities broke down, and by the early 1980s, its programming consisted of a still shot of Scott with audio of his speeches. An FCC investigation of Faith Center's practices led to years of attempts to sell the station under a distress sale policy that permitted below-market-value sales of legally troubled stations to minority-controlled groups.

On the third try, Faith Center was successful in proposing Astroline Communications, a Hispanic-controlled partnership, as the buyer. The station was off the air from January to September 1985 and returned as the market's third independent. WTXX and WTIC-TV (channel 61) were already established, and channel 18 was stuck in third place with less attractive programming outside of sports broadcasts. Alan Shurberg, a computer consultant who wanted to run channel 18 himself, protested Astroline's qualifications and the distress sale policy in a case that reached the Supreme Court as Metro Broadcasting, Inc. v. FCC in 1990; the justices upheld the distress sale policy. The legal battles sapped an already drained station; it filed for bankruptcy reorganization in 1988, and the case was converted to a liquidation in 1991, forcing channel 18 off the air. The trustee identified a buyer, but Shurberg challenged the minority qualifications of Astroline itself, resulting in the FCC calling an evidentiary hearing on the matter in 1997. In order to meet new federal regulations, the station returned to the air that year and broadcast infomercial and home shopping programming.

Entravision brought the long-running proceeding to an end in 2000 by settling the case for a total of $18 million and becoming the new buyer. On April 1, 2001, WHCT became WUVN, an affiliate of Univision; two years later, Entravision began producing a regional newscast for its Boston and Hartford stations. Entravision sold the station's spectrum for $125 million in 2017; as a result, WUVN is broadcast by the low-power WUTH-CD with a signal largely confined to the Hartford area.

== Early years ==
=== Establishment as WGTH-TV ===
On April 14, 1952, the Federal Communications Commission (FCC) ended a multi-year freeze on new television station assignments and allocated two channels to Hartford: very high frequency (VHF) channel 3 and ultra high frequency (UHF) channel 18. The first applicant for the channel was The Hartford Times, the city's afternoon newspaper and owner of radio station WTHT, the youngest of Hartford's major radio stations. The second group to apply was Hartford radio station WONS, owned by the General Tele-Radio Corporation and the city's Mutual Broadcasting System and Yankee Network outlet. WONS had been interested in television since 1947, when it applied for channel 3, at the time allocated to Springfield, Massachusetts; when channel 3 was reassigned to Hartford, the WONS application was dismissed. General Tele-Radio exercised an option on land on Avon Mountain. By September 1953, the FCC was ready to set up the hearings to determine winning applicants for channels 3 and 18.

On October 20, 1953, WTHT and WONS announced they were merging their radio and television stations, clearing the way for channel 18 to be awarded to the new General-Times Television Corporation, owned 55 percent by General Tele-Radio. Consequently, on February 15, 1954, WTHT left the air; its programming and ABC was merged with WONS to become WGTH on February 13, 1954. Channel 18 obtained affiliation with ABC and the DuMont Television Network; it was the 200th affiliate of ABC. In Avon, the FM antenna of the former WONS-FM was removed to make way for a new antenna to broadcast channel 18 on the same tower.

WGTH-TV put out its first test pattern on August 4, 1954, and began broadcasting regular programming on September 25 as the first TV station in Hartford. Its first presentation was an ABC college football game between Michigan State and Iowa; studios were on 555 Asylum Street, where WTHT had its radio studios.

Channel 18, now on the air, joined a growing attempt involving other UHF stations in Connecticut and western Massachusetts to have channel 3—still pending award—removed from commercial use in Hartford and replaced with channel 24, which had been allocated for educational broadcasts. The stations believed that channel 3, if built as a commercial station, would "upset" the work done by the stations in converting households to UHF. The commission barred this action, but it continued to be up for discussion as the FCC wrestled with the question of deintermixing VHF and UHF stations. One of the pending applicants for channel 3 was Hartford radio station WTIC, a longtime NBC affiliate. NBC upset WTIC's likely plans by acquiring WKNB-TV in New Britain, Connecticut. At the time, one company could own up to five VHF stations but up to seven UHF outlets, incentivizing an otherwise capped station group like NBC to add a UHF station.

In addition to network programs, WGTH-TV produced local shows at its Asylum Street studios. Charles Norwood, a newscaster on New Haven–based WNHC-TV, moved to channel 18 and presented the evening news. In 1955, channel 18 began airing Flippy the Clown, a children's show that had originated on WNHC-TV the year before.

=== WHCT: Hartford's CBS station ===
NBC's purchase of WKNB-TV set up a series of affiliate switches in Connecticut television, as WKNB-TV had been the CBS affiliate, and WNHC-TV lost its NBC affiliation; the New Haven station's protests had delayed the sale to NBC. CBS would be otherwise without an affiliate in the state, leading to a sudden burst of speculation in early July 1955 that the CBS network would buy WGTH-TV to become its Hartford station. On July 8, CBS announced the $650,000 purchase of WGTH-TV from General-Times Television Corporation with the intention of moving CBS network programming to channel 18; simultaneously, the Times exited WGTH radio. The move was hailed as a boost for the flagging fortunes of UHF television. It was CBS's second UHF purchase; in 1954, the network had bought WXIX in Milwaukee. The news was a surprise to NBC executives, who did not expect CBS to follow them into UHF broadcasting in the same market. It also caused WNHC-TV to affiliate with ABC, which would soon be forced from channel 18. While the sale was pending, WGTH-TV became the CBS affiliate for Connecticut on October 1. During 1955, General Tele-Radio carried out an acquisition of its own: the purchase of and merger with RKO Radio Pictures.

The FCC granted the sale of WGTH-TV to CBS in February 1956 but stayed it two months later on a petition from WNHC-TV, whose protests also had held up the sale of WKNB-TV to NBC. The New Haven station believed that the loss of CBS would cause economic injury only partially compensated by the addition of ABC programs. After Triangle Publications acquired WNHC-TV, it immediately withdrew the protests, clearing the commission to grant the sale to CBS. On September 16, 1956, WGTH-TV changed its call sign to WHCT.

In April 1957, the station's morning news segments began to be presented from a streetside studio with large windows fronting onto Asylum Street, allowing passersby to see programs in production and for the incorporation of outdoor images into the weathercasts. Later that year, the station debuted a local talent show featuring area children. CBS acquired the studio building in the transaction but sold it to Louis K. Roth in January 1958. It arranged to lease back the portion used by channel 18, much of which had been remodeled since the sale; the upper two floors were unused, while an office tenant was about to vacate the second floor.

=== Exit of CBS ===
The network felt compelled to affiliate with WTIC-TV while the opportunity was still available. To ignore the opportunity at this time would have placed the network at the grave risk of a serious competitive disadvantage for the indefinite future.

— Frank Stanton, on the decision to shut down WHCT and affiliate with WTIC-TV

For the entire time CBS owned WHCT, proceedings in the channel 3 case continued. In July 1956, the FCC tentatively awarded the channel to WTIC and its parent, Travelers Insurance Company, though its construction was deferred until the FCC decided whether to keep the VHF channel in Hartford or transfer it to Providence, Rhode Island. On February 27, 1957, the FCC decided on a 4–3 vote that channel 3 would remain allocated to Hartford. The manager of the new WTIC-TV declared that his station would not seek a network affiliation, and it began as an independent station on September 23, 1957.

In a surprise announcement in New York, CBS president Frank Stanton declared on October 9, 1958, that CBS would take WHCT off the air and affiliate with WTIC-TV on November 15. Stanton justified the decision as a good for the network by increasing its coverage on the VHF station with a wider coverage area and the assurance of reception in all homes; his statement cited the need to avoid the CBS television network being put at a long-term "serious competitive disadvantage". Simultaneously, Merle Jones, the president of the CBS television stations division, informed WHCT's 72 employees that their jobs would be eliminated. The decision by CBS to abandon the WHCT project came three months after NBC abandoned its highly-touted UHF station in Buffalo, New York, WBUF-TV. A column in Variety noted that "CBS probably figured 'If NBC could do it in Buffalo, why can't we do it in Hartford?'". It also pointed out that many in the industry had expected NBC to move from its UHF station to WTIC-TV, whose radio sister station had a lengthy historic association with NBC and which had been assumed as early as 1953 to be a likely NBC television affiliate.

As CBS took WHCT off the air, it filed to sell channel 18 to Capital Broadcasting—a consortium led by Edward D. Taddei, the general manager of WNHC-TV—for $250,000, which was less than half what CBS had paid for the station two years prior. The new owners put channel 18 back into service on January 24, 1959, with a limited schedule of programs. Two duckpin bowling lanes were installed on the third floor of the 555 Asylum building, and the station began offering weekly bowling telecasts. Another source of programming was an affiliation with New York's WNTA-TV, bringing to the channel 18 lineup shows such as The Mike Wallace Interview and Open End.

== RKO General ownership and subscription TV test ==
On March 31, 1960, RKO General announced plans to use Hartford and WHCT as a test bed for subscription television (STV) programming. It proposed a service to bring otherwise unavailable programs, such as first-run motion pictures, to viewers utilizing specialized decoders to be made by Zenith Radio Corporation. While the proposed service required FCC approval, RKO General moved to purchase channel 18 from Taddei immediately for $900,000. The subscription system would utilize Zenith's Phonevision technology; each program would cost between 75 cents and $1.50, and the decoder would keep a running receipt for subscribers to calculate their bill and send money to RKO.

The license transfer to RKO General subsidiary Hartford Phonevision, Inc., took place on July 11, 1960. The station continued as a conventional, advertiser-supported independent station while RKO General and Zenith sought FCC permission to carry out a three-year test of subscription television service. Local programming during this time included duckpin bowling; Teensville, a local series for young adults; public affairs and interview program Be Our Guest; and Let's Travel, a weekly travelogue. That November, WHCT was the first station in Connecticut to present signed coverage of election returns for the benefit of deaf viewers.

=== Subscription TV ===
After multiple days of hearings before the FCC in October 1960, discussing everything from programming to proposed charges and the possible impact on other television service, the commission granted approval for a three-year test of subscription television over WHCT in February 1961. With approval in hand, preparations began to start the service, including the manufacture of a test run of decoders. Shortly ahead of the subscription launch, in April 1962, RKO General hired Charles O. Wood III, the co-manager of RKO-owned WGMS in Washington, D.C., to run channel 18.

On the evening of June 30, 1962, WHCT broadcast an inaugural ceremony for subscription TV in its studios. After the program, 200 subscribers were instructed to dial the program code 000D into their decoders and saw the film Sunrise at Campobello. WHCT officials predicted they would have 5,000 subscribers by year's end. The station presented subscription TV programs nightly except on evenings when the station aired New York Mets baseball. In September, WHCT subscribers were the only viewers in America to see the boxing match of Floyd Patterson vs. Sonny Liston in their homes.

We lost money at an alarming rate ... and [RKO] let me off the hook very gently. They said, "You're fired."

— Charles Osgood, on being WHCT's general manager from 1962 to 1963

By the end of the first year, subscription TV had 3,000 subscribers, fewer than anticipated; RKO officials hoped to be able to upgrade from "subsequent first-run" movies, available 17 days after a showing in a theater in Hartford, to first-run films. The station was losing money; Wood was fired. He struggled to find other managerial positions, given the uniqueness of WHCT, going to work for ABC News and later CBS News under his first and middle name, Charles Osgood. By 1965, subscription TV had reached its FCC-imposed cap of 5,000 subscribers; the only new users were being added to replace subscribers who discontinued service. Nonetheless, the test was successful enough to motivate RKO to ask for a three-year extension, which it received, and Zenith to ask for authority to allow all stations nationwide to add STV capabilities.

During the second term of the STV experiment, RKO General began flirting with plans to expand the WHCT physical plant at a new site and with increased non-subscription programming. In 1967, the company proposed an expanded studio and office complex at Avon Mountain, which met with strong opposition from local homeowners, as the station's transmitter site was located in a residential area. The station bulked up its live programming with an evening sports-and-news show; the sports segment was co-anchored by retired boxer Willie Pep. In January 1968, RKO General announced a $2 million investment into WHCT that would include the construction of new studios, capability to present local shows in color, and a higher-power and taller transmitter facility. The new studios would be part of the redevelopment of Hartford's Trumbull Street; it proposed an office building on the northwest corner of Trumbull and Church streets. While those plans were under consideration, RKO General applied to the FCC for a second extension of the subscription TV test, and it began presenting color films during its ad-supported broadcast day, though the Phonevision system only worked in black-and-white. By May 1968, RKO General's plans for its new Hartford studios had grown from a three-story facility to a 15-story tower containing four floors of parking, street-level studios, offices for the station, and additional office space for lease. A ceremonial groundbreaking was held for the RKO General Building in late July; at that time, the company anticipated completion at the end of 1969.

=== Switch to independent operation and legal reverses ===
Beginning in late 1968, WHCT experienced a series of reverses and changes in business plan. The first came in November 1968, when the station slashed its subscription output from 28 hours a week to 12, saying that it would be able to present a higher quality of films with fewer repetition. To fill the time, channel 18 began airing CBS shows not cleared by WTIC-TV. On December 30, citing the recent approval of national pay TV service by the FCC, RKO announced that it would terminate the six-year experiment on January 31, 1969, and remove the decoders from the more than 4,000 subscribing households. Not only had the experimental period ended, in RKO's estimation, but the standards adopted by the FCC required subscription programs to be in color—something its existing system was incapable of doing, which Osgood later assessed as a reason for the system's failure at a time when color TV was growing in popularity. Even though the company had 10,000 decoders on hand and as many as 7,000 subscribers, heavy losses in the STV test had led to the company running a minimum service toward the end.

With the station once again a full-time, commercial independent station, WHCT promoted its new program lineup as "Yours for the Viewing: Now All You Pay Is Attention". Among the local shows channel 18 programmed was Operation Unabridged, hosted by Larry Woods, the only TV show in Hartford focusing on the Black community. Citing the end of the subscription experiment, RKO General began to reevaluate its business plan for WHCT as well as its Hartford construction plans.

Also weighing on channel 18 in 1969 and 1970 were a pair of adverse FCC actions. In June 1969, the FCC renewed WHCT's license, as well as those for the RKO General stations in Boston (WNAC-TV) and New York (WOR-TV), on a conditional basis pending antitrust lawsuits against RKO General subsidiaries in Ohio. WHCT's bid for a power increase was protested by WHNB-TV (channel 30) in New Britain and designated for hearing by the FCC in March 1970; the main issue was whether the increase would cause WHCT's signal to overlap with those of WOR-TV and WNAC-TV, something generally forbidden at the time. In an attempt to secure FCC approval, RKO General said it would sell the station if the increase were approved. When the commission refused to grant the requested upgrade, RKO General put WHCT up for sale anyway; it believed that a buyer without New York and Boston stations would have no trouble proposing the same improvement. While the station was on the market, the owners laid off eleven employees and reduced its broadcast day. The station was losing $50,000 to $60,000 a month and had lost a total of $11 million during the six and a half years it aired subscription TV programming.

== Faith Center ownership ==
=== Donation ===
After receiving no offers for WHCT at an asking price of $2 million, RKO General announced on April 30, 1971, that it would donate the station to Faith Center of Glendale, California, which operated KHOF FM and KHOF-TV in the Los Angeles area. Faith Center proposed to broadcast primarily religious programs but keep New York Yankees baseball on the channel 18 schedule. Black and Puerto Rican leaders in Hartford protested the acquisition on fears that Faith Center would not be responsive to their needs, noting that Faith Center proposed to ax 56 hours of programming a week from the station's schedule. The commission disagreed with the objection and approved the transfer of WHCT to Faith Center in February 1972. A local minority group appealed this action in federal court, which rejected its contention that the conversion of WHCT to a specialized Christian program format diminished service to the community in the same way as was being contended in several contemporary cases about radio station formats.

Under its new ownership, channel 18 again made tentative steps toward expanding its facilities. Avon officials denied the station in its first attempt to expand the Avon Mountain transmitter facility in November 1972, insisting the station own more surrounding land in the event of a tower collapse. A local family agreed to sell land to Faith Center to accommodate a new site on Talcott Mountain; local residents were upset by the town of Bloomfield's decision to permit the construction of a new 500-foot (150 m) tower in the residential zone, and the matter was appealed in court. Channel 18 tried again by joining a proposal by radio station WKSS to build on Rattlesnake Mountain in Farmington. Faith Center briefly merged with the Hartford Gospel Tabernacle, a local church, in 1973; the church was renamed the Faith Center of Hartford, but the affiliation had been dissolved by 1977.

In 1975, Faith Center attempted to sell bonds in the church to its parishioners and instead found itself $3.5 million in debt, the plan leaving the church and its broadcasting stations in a perilous financial condition. Twice between January and June, WHCT reduced its hours of operation, citing a poor economy. That year, Faith Center attempted to sell WHCT to the Christian Broadcasting Network (CBN) of Portsmouth, Virginia; at the time, it had deals pending to sell KHOF FM in Los Angeles and KVOF-TV in San Francisco to the Trinity Broadcasting Network. The application met with local opposition, with groups signaling that CBN would face the same issues in running the station in the same manner; the station manager for Faith Center blamed the underpowered transmitter, which limited channel 18's reach. Faith Center rescinded this application in February 1976. The station continued to broadcast some non-religious programming. It fired Woods in 1976 over the involvement of Wesleyan University students in producing his programming, but the station picked up several New England Whalers hockey games in a trial run for possible future telecasts.

Another sports program WHCT aired was Sports Only, a half-hour local sports show that was produced by Bill Rasmussen and debuted in 1976. It was a predecessor in format to SportsCenter, which was the first program broadcast by the Rasmussen-founded ESPN when it began three years later.

=== Tax battles ===
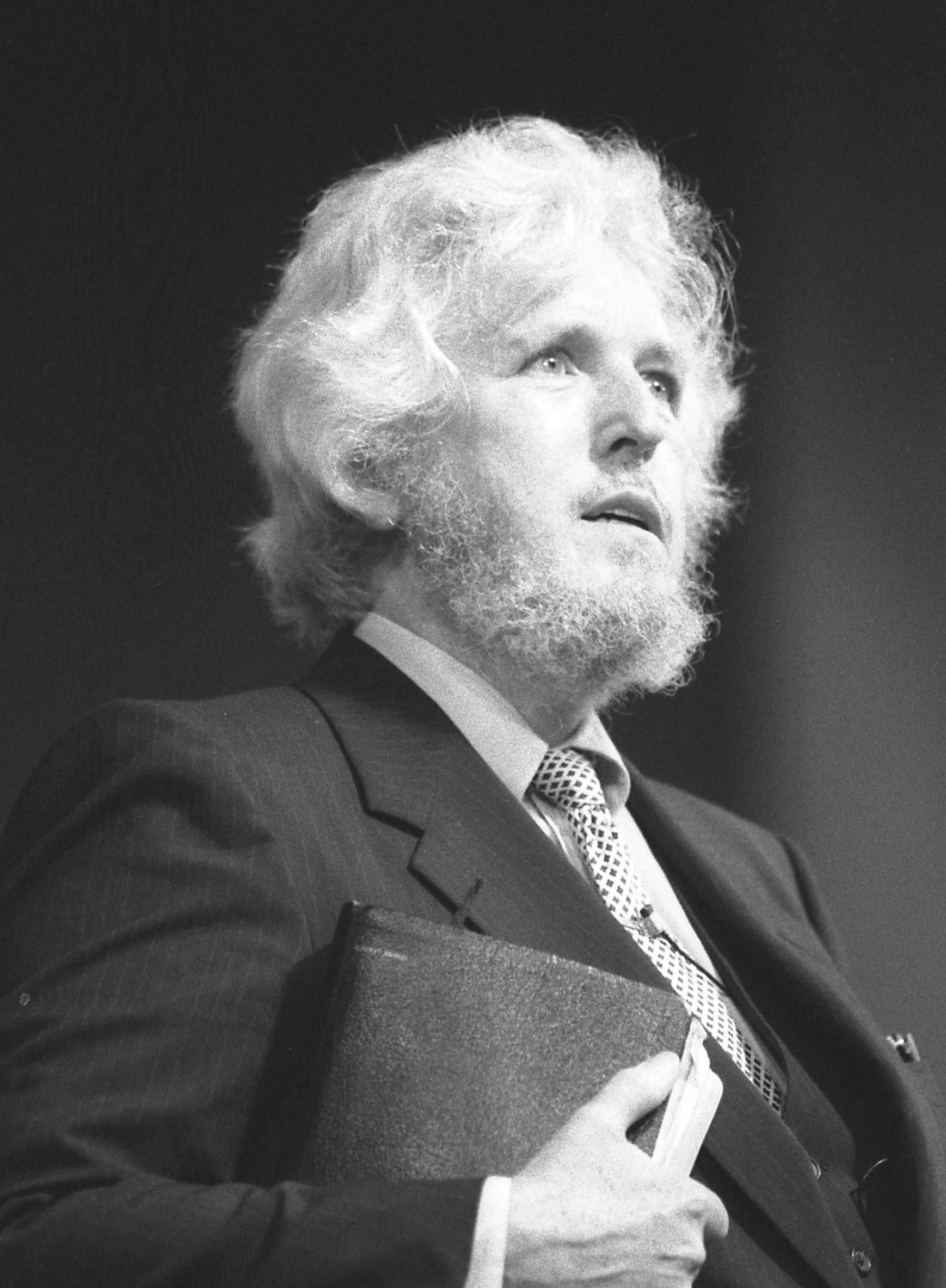
Gene Scott

Gene Scott joined the church as a financial consultant and then became its pastor after Faith Center's board ousted Raymond Schoch. Under Scott, a televangelist, Faith Center became more strident, particularly in its belief that—as a religious organization—its activities were tax-exempt. Local governments disagreed, finding that Faith Center had not qualified for tax-exempt status. On March 1, 1977, the deputy sheriff of Avon padlocked the WHCT transmitter site for nonpayment of a $7,000 tax bill to the town. The station paid the bill and returned to the air the next night. On his taped Festival of Faith program, Scott announced that Faith Center was challenging the government's ability to collect taxes owed by religious institutions without a court hearing in the belief that, unfettered, local governments could "destroy" financially strapped churches. On March 4, facing a $77,000 tax bill from the city of Hartford for the Asylum Street studio building, station officials holed up inside and refused to allow the deputy sheriff entry when he attempted to serve eviction papers. Scott taped messages calling for viewers to sign a "letter of outrage" and urged them to call city and county authorities. At one point, Scott went 65 hours without sleeping.

On March 9, 1977, Avon officials seized the transmitter again, this time for the unpaid tax bill in Hartford; earlier in the day, Scott had denounced an effort to silence him with "police-state tactics". Under protest, Faith Center paid the $77,000 in taxes plus penalties. While Faith Center continued to challenge Hartford and Avon officials in court over the tax obligations—a case that reached the Connecticut Supreme Court, which found against Faith Center—the station suffered through a variety of other problems. A fire in June 1977 activated the sprinkler system at 555 Asylum, causing heavy water damage; the station fired six engineers for attempts to unionize, which a National Labor Relations Board administrative law judge found to be illegal and ordered the station to compensate them. Vandals smashed $600,000 of WHCT's transmitting equipment in July 1979, which was estimated to keep channel 18 off the air for a month. The vandals left a handwritten note containing an unspecified "derogatory remark" against Scott.

=== First distress sale attempt ===
By the end of the 1970s, Faith Center was facing increasing FCC scrutiny of its broadcast properties in California. In 1978, the FCC began investigating charges that KHOF-TV in San Bernardino solicited funds from viewers but did not use them for the purposes that were stated; Faith Center refused to turn over financial documents, calling the exercise an "illegal fishing expedition" and claiming that it violated separation of church and state. In March 1980, administrative law judge Edward Luton found against KHOF-TV and ruled that that station's license should not be renewed. The ruling called into question Faith Center's character qualifications to be a licensee and put the other broadcast outlets at risk, especially the California stations that also had pending license renewals.

In April 1980, Faith Center reached an agreement to sell all three of its television stations to the Television Corporation of Hartford for $15 million. The agreement utilized the then-new distress sale policy, which allowed for stations facing possible hearings at the FCC to exit them by selling to minority-controlled licensees for substantially less than market value. Television Corporation of Hartford was a joint venture constructed in such a way as to qualify as a minority-controlled licensee. It consisted of Television Corporation of Virginia, a group of investors that owned WTVZ-TV in Norfolk, Virginia; Herman Valentine, a Black employee of WTVZ; and the East Los Angeles Community Union (TELACU), a Hispanic group. It proposed to operate the two California stations owned by Faith Center with Spanish-language programming and WHCT as an English-language independent. The station was in dire need of investment, having vacated the Asylum Street studios due to a proposed rent increase. By 1981, it had no working video tape machines at Avon Mountain, so viewers saw a still image of Scott.

The deal met with opposition and difficulty from various sources, among them the 46 different legal cases involving Faith Center as of 1980. A group of religious leaders in Hartford filed a petition to instead deny WHCT a renewal of its broadcast license, seeking to prevent Faith Center from profiting from a sale of the station; the FCC denied this request, allowing Faith Center to pursue a distress sale for the Hartford outlet, but stripped KHOF-TV of its license and forced KVOF-TV into comparative hearing with other applicants. The complicated ownership structure of Television Corporation of Hartford, with Valentine as the deciding shareholder, raised questions as to whether minority ownership or Valentine's affiliation with Television Corporation of Virginia would prevail in making decisions.

In early March 1982, the FCC transferred the license to Television Corporation of Hartford, though LDA Communications, a group involved in the comparative hearing for the Faith Center station in San Francisco, appealed the decision in federal court, fearing that the $4 million obtained in the sale would become a "war chest" for Faith Center to prolong litigation. As such, the deal remained pending when a new complication arose involving TELACU. In March 1982, the Los Angeles Times published a three-part report revealing that the Department of Labor was investigating TELACU for misuse of federal funds. The reports revealed that much of TELACU's spending took place away from its focus area of East Los Angeles, with investments in projects elsewhere in the U.S. and in Europe, and that current and former employees had illegally borrowed from the company; that TELACU executives received shares in the station without any financial outlay on their part; that some of the company's business investments, made based on federal anti-poverty grants, were unsound; and that TELACU was doing little to create jobs in the communities it was intended to serve.

Almost anything would be better than what the city has been given on the frequency for the last few years. For just a few hours at night, the television station has shown a slide of the Rev. W. Eugene Scott ... The station had no locally originated programs and no equipment to create them even if it wanted to. Its phone number for a time was unlisted.

— Editorial board of the Hartford Courant

The report caused concern for the future of the WHCT purchase. In April, the FCC rescinded its approval for the sale, acting on the LDA Communications petition, in order to review stockholder and purchase agreements related to Television Corporation of Hartford in light of the revelations in the Times's reporting. In the meantime, Television Corporation of Hartford began the zoning process for a new 499-foot (152 m) tower in Middletown to broadcast channel 18; approval was controversial and contested by nearby landowners who feared depreciation of their property values.

The Virginia investors of Television Corporation of Virginia withdrew from the transaction in July; Gene Loving, one of the investors, told the Richmond Times-Dispatch in a 1983 interview that "[w]e made the decision we couldn't be in business with them". TELACU continued to pursue the purchase of channel 18, in spite of the loss of its financial backing and the pending federal investigation, but unable to raise funds, it abandoned its bid to acquire WHCT in October 1982.

=== Second and third distress sale attempts ===
With TELACU's withdrawal, Faith Center made a second attempt to conduct a distress sale of WHCT. The proposed buyer was Interstate Media Corporation, a Los Angeles broadcast consulting firm controlled by Joseph Delano Jones. The transaction received FCC approval in September 1983, but it never closed. In June 1984, Faith Center proposed another distress buyer to the commission: Richard Ramirez, head of Astroline Communications. Ramirez was the Hispanic owner and general partner of Astroline, which was connected to Astroline Corporation, a Saugus, Massachusetts–based oil wholesale company. The $3.1 million sale was officially filed in August 1984; Ramirez promised a major investment to upgrade the ailing station's facilities and a switch to full-time independent status. The viability of such a station was questioned from the start, as two additional independent stations had been established in the Connecticut market in recent years: WTXX (channel 20) in 1982 and WTIC-TV (channel 61) in 1984.

Another prospective television station owner sought channel 18. Alan Shurberg, a computer programmer from Rocky Hill, filed in December 1983 for a competing application to the WHCT license. Shurberg, who desired to program channel 18 as an independent station, sought the ability to apply for a whole new license. Over the objections of FCC staff, the commission moved to approve the sale to Astroline in late September, but it said that if Astroline's deal were to fall through or the buyer were to not qualify as a minority, the channel would be opened to new applicants. A final decision was approved by the FCC and upheld by the United States Court of Appeals for the District of Columbia Circuit in December.

== Astroline Communications ownership ==
=== Acquisition and reconstruction ===
Astroline took control of WHCT on January 24, 1985. The station immediately left the air while the new owners assembled a programming inventory to replace Gene Scott with off-network reruns of shows such as Dallas, Knots Landing, and Columbo. Shurberg—notoriously private and a mystery to others in the WHCT case—was profiled in a February 1985 article in the Courant, noting that others wondered about the source of his money—a computer consulting business—and his friendship with Arnold Chase, owner of WTIC radio and television. He made weekly trips to Washington to keep up with the case.

Astroline initially intended to begin "interim operation" with a satellite-delivered program service before returning the station to air with its full schedule for the fall television season. However, the station needed more significant investment. In February, Astroline applied to the town of Avon to replace its existing tower with one twice as tall. Once more, the proposal met with bitter opposition. Residents feared that the taller tower would require strobe lights to meet federal aviation requirements, as had been the case when WTIC-TV erected its tower on Rattlesnake Mountain.

After being denied a 796-foot (243 m) tower by the town of Avon, station officials began a search for a new site but returned to Avon Mountain, this time with a proposal to build a 750-foot (230 m) mast on a much larger parcel across from the towers of several other local broadcast stations. Yet again, residents of Avon, Farmington, and West Hartford organized in opposition, primarily on unfounded concerns over radiation, but Avon granted zoning approval to the new site in November 1985.

While the station sought tower site approvals, Astroline put WHCT back on the air on September 30, 1985, from new studios on Garden Street. The station entered a competitive market; it was not assured coverage on local cable thanks to the recent abolition of must-carry rules, but United Cable, the main system in the Hartford area, added channel 18 to its lineup in mid-October. Over the next year, it secured the rights to Hartford Whalers hockey and Hartford Hawks men's basketball and began producing some local programs. Despite the Whalers deal, with WHCT replacing WVIT as the team's broadcaster, channel 18 could not fully capitalize on the hockey team because of its poor signal. The station was missing from cable systems in half of the state, and some of those that did carry it only added the station for hockey.

=== Shurberg court battle and bankruptcy ===
Responding to Shurberg's continued challenges to the FCC's distress sale policy, the commission upheld its 1984 approval of the Astroline sale in April 1987. In February 1988, after a requirement to do so was attached to the commission's appropriations by Congress, the FCC again affirmed its statements in the Shurberg case and two others involving preferences to minority and female applicants for new stations.

WHCT faced tough market conditions, with three independent stations operating in Hartford; by 1987, some industry experts feared one would likely be unable to continue within a year. As the latest entrant, its syndicated programming inventory was of lower quality than channels 20 or 61, which it trailed in the ratings, and other independents from outside the market were available on cable. Further, the Shurberg case required continued time and legal resources. In late 1988, syndicators including Columbia Pictures Television and Lorimar Television began to pull programming rights from channel 18 for nonpayment, and that November, Lorimar, MCA Television, and Orion Pictures—together owed $11.6 million—filed a motion to force the station into involuntary bankruptcy. A judge instead let WHCT continue operating while it worked out a repayment plan for its debts. Among the creditors was the Whalers, who nonetheless renewed their contract with channel 18 for the 1989–90 NHL season. As the Home Shopping Network began to occupy more of channel 18's broadcast day, the station's audience became too small to measure in total-day ratings.

On March 31, 1989, the U.S. Court of Appeals for the D.C. Circuit in Shurberg Broadcasting of Hartford Inc. vs. FCC ruled 2–1 in favor of Alan Shurberg and struck down the FCC's distress sale policy. The majority decision cited the 1978 Supreme Court decision Regents of the University of California v. Bakke, which considered racial preference in medical school admissions. The FCC announced it would not appeal the decision, and the court refused an en banc review. Ramirez declared that the sale of WHCT would be a last resort and that the company would seek new investors or financing to keep channel 18 going.

Astroline, arguing that the court's decision applied an unreasonable standard, appealed to the Supreme Court. The court took up Astroline's appeal as well as that of Metro Broadcasting in a case involving preferences for women and minorities in the award of a television station permit in Orlando, Florida. That case had also been decided by the D.C. Circuit but in favor of minority preferences. Briefs by the FCC, in the Astroline portion of the case, and the Department of Justice, in the Metro portion of the case, illustrated opposing views on affirmative action programs, which the FCC defended and the Department of Justice attacked. The case was of interest to many court watchers due to its possible impact outside of broadcasting. During oral argument, the justices hinted that the scarcity of mass media outlets, radio frequencies and TV channels and the regulated status of broadcasting might move them to allow preferential policies.

On June 27, 1990, the last day of the court's term, the Supreme Court handed down its decision in Metro Broadcasting, Inc. v. FCC. In a 5–4 decision authored by liberal justice William J. Brennan Jr. and unusually joined by the conservative Byron White, the court upheld the FCC's policies giving preference to women and minorities and the distress sale policy. The ruling was a victory for WHCT; Ramirez believed it opened the door to putting the station on a sound financial footing.

=== Shutdown and trusteeship ===
With the Shurberg court fight at last over, WHCT's existing problems became the renewed focus of attention, headlined by its $20 million in outstanding debt. The Whalers left the station in the 1990–91 season, opting to put their games on WTXX to better reach New Haven County. A Courant preview of the November 1990 television sweeps said of the station, "Against all odds, it's still alive and kicking." The main highlights of its programming day were the Catholic Mass and Boston Celtics basketball telecasts.

In February 1991, the major creditors of Astroline filed a motion to convert the bankruptcy case from a Chapter 11 reorganization to a Chapter 7 liquidation of the company's assets. As time went on, Astroline's lawyers became less optimistic about reaching a deal with the creditors; by early April, the station began preparing for an expected order to liquidate and shut down, as the creditors refused to grant Astroline time to find a buyer even though the station had generated positive cash flow for more than a year.

WHCT left the air on the afternoon of April 9, 1991, shortly after a judge converted the Chapter 11 bankruptcy to Chapter 7. Causes cited for the station's demise included the drain of legal representation in the Shurberg cases; the end of must-carry limiting the station's cable reach; rising prices for syndicated programming; and the recession that was most acute in New England. Its demise left the Celtics to sign last-minute deals with WVIT and WTWS in New London to air the remaining games in the NBA season.

Martin W. Hoffman was named bankruptcy trustee for Astroline Communications and began negotiating with various prospective buyers for WHCT, while other potential owners instead applied for competing applications against its license. Among them were Alan Shurberg and Stamford-based radio group Sage Broadcasting. Industry experts suggested that a specialty programmer would be most suited to buy channel 18 given the intense competition in the market. In November 1993, Hoffman filed an application with the FCC to sell the station to Two If By Sea Broadcasting Corporation for $250,000. The company owned less than 30 percent of WTVE in Reading, Pennsylvania, and 51 percent of WHRC-TV in Norwell, Massachusetts.

Shurberg contested the still-pending license renewal of WHCT and the sale to Two If By Sea. He asserted, based on documents uncovered in Astroline's 1991 chapter 7 bankruptcy case, that Astroline had misrepresented itself as a minority-controlled entity, claiming that its limited partners functioned as general partners and that Ramirez held less control of the company than advertised. During this time, to avoid a new deadline to go on air contained in Section 312(g) of the Telecommunications Act of 1996, the station began broadcasting on February 5, 1997. In April 1997, the commission designated his application for a new station for hearing with the license renewal for WHCT, finding that Shurberg's allegations raised "a substantial and material question of fact warranting exploration in an evidentiary hearing".

After returning to the air, WHCT cycled between several infomercial and home shopping services. It debuted with Infomall TV, switched to Shop at Home Network in June 1998, and changed to ValueVision in January 1999.

== WUVN: Entravision ownership ==
In 2000, Entravision Communications struck a deal with the parties in the long-running proceeding under which it would pay $18 million to settle all the claims and become the proposed buyer of WHCT, with Two If By Sea receiving $9.52 million, Shurberg receiving $7.48 million, and Astroline receiving the remaining $1 million. The FCC's Enforcement Bureau believed that the length of the case warranted accepting a "white knight" offer, typically frowned upon. Entravision's offer was briefly threatened by a separate dispute with Barbara Laurence, who attempted to obtain a 10-percent stake in WHCT and WNTO in Daytona Beach, Florida, by alleging that she found the stations for Entravision. The FCC granted the request in an order in October 2000, noting that its action allowed for the Astroline bankruptcy case to be terminated, avoided a comparative hearing (which had since been abolished), and wound up a proceeding dating back more than a decade.

Entravision, an operator of Spanish-language TV stations, announced that channel 18 would affiliate with Univision, replacing the ValueVision home shopping programming previously offered by the station. Simultaneously, it acquired WUNI (channel 27) in Worcester, Massachusetts, a Univision affiliate serving the Boston market. The station changed its call sign to WUVN and began broadcasting Univision programming on April 1, 2001. Two years later, in 2003, Univision began producing a regional Spanish-language newscast from Boston to serve WUNI and WUVN. Though the station continues to air the news program from Boston, Entravision raised the possibility of starting a local newscast when it bought the station in 2001 and again in 2006.

In 2017, Entravision sold WUVN's spectrum in the FCC's incentive auction for $125,568,545. Entravision then entered WUVN into a channel-sharing agreement with its WUTH-CD (channel 47), a low-power station receivable in the Hartford area. (Note: The then-Spanish International Network began broadcasting in Hartford as a translator rebroadcasting WXTV from the New York City area on June 28, 1980. The translator switched from channel 61 to channel 47 in 1984 to accommodate a new Hartford full-power TV station. The translator, which gained Class A status, changed call signs to WUTH-CA in 2001 and was one of the launch stations for Telefutura (now UniMás) on January 14, 2002.)

== WHTX-LD: From Hartford to Springfield ==
WHTX-LD, which rebroadcasts WUVN in Springfield, Massachusetts, has its origins in W10CG, a low-power station on channel 10 in Hartford that signed on in February 1997, using WHCT's former Garden Street facilities. Becoming WHTX-LP on March 31, the station shut down in December 1998 to make room for WTNH's digital signal; its programming from America One and the American Independent Network was moved to former simulcast partner WMLD-LP. As the station did not return to the air within a year of going dark, the license was deemed to have expired by the FCC on October 11, 2002. However, original owner Harvard Broadcasting claimed to the FCC that WHTX had briefly resumed operations on an annual basis, and the license was reinstated a month later; it was sold to Entravision soon thereafter.

Entravision moved the station to channel 43 in Springfield and signed the new WHTX-LP on the air in November 2003 as a semi-satellite of WUVN. WHTX was picked up by Comcast's Springfield-area systems on July 10, 2006, replacing the national Univision feed. Soon after WHTX made its move, Meredith Corporation filed an objection, stating that the station's claimed resumptions were not enough to avoid the automatic expiration of its license and that there were sufficient channels available in the Hartford area for WHTX to use. As a result, the move was never formally granted even a construction permit and was operated by a series of special temporary authority grants; on March 9, 2009, the FCC overturned the reinstatement of the WHTX license and revoked its operating authority. After finding that there was insufficient evidence to prove that WHTX-LP had in fact failed to operate for twelve consecutive months, the FCC again reinstated the station's license on November 3, 2014, and directed Entravision to file a new displacement application; on November 7, it filed to construct a digital companion channel for WHTX, again specifying operation on channel 43 in Springfield. The WHTX-LD signal was licensed on September 29, 2015.

== Subchannels ==
Grade A signal contours for WUTH-CD–WUVN and WHTX-LD; WUTH-CD–WUVN (RF 22) Hartford, CT; WHTX-LD (RF 24) Springfield, MA

WUVN and WUTH-CD broadcast from a transmitter on Birch Mountain Road in Glastonbury, Connecticut. WHTX-LD broadcasts from a transmitter on Provin Mountain in Agawam, Massachusetts. The stations' signals are multiplexed:

Subchannels of WUTH-CD and WUVN
License	Subchannel	Res.	Short name	Programming
WUTH-CD	47.1	1080i	Unimas	UniMás
WUVN	18.1	1080i	WUVN-HD	Univision
WUVN	18.4	480i	LATV	LATV

Subchannels of WHTX-LD
Subchannel	Res.	Short name	Programming
43.1	1080i	Univisn	Univision
43.4	480i	ESTRLLA	Estrella TV
43.88	1080i	AltaVsn	AltaVision

Subchannel broadcast with MPEG-4 video
