= Charles Osgood =

American television news anchor (1933–2024)

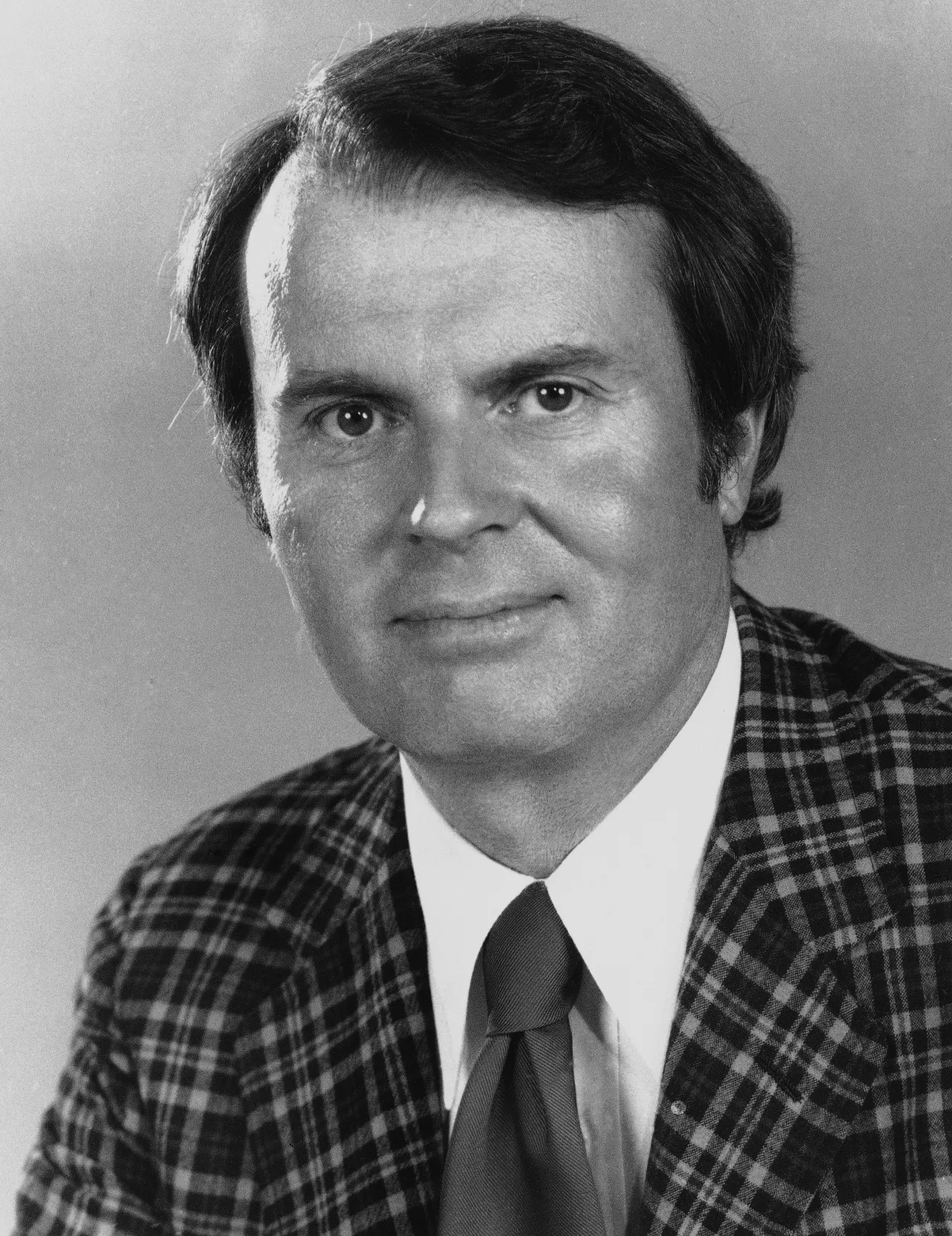
- Osgood in 1979
- Born: Charles Osgood Wood III; January 8, 1933; New York City, New York, U.S.
- Died: January 23, 2024 (aged 91); Saddle River, New Jersey, U.S.
- Education: Fordham University
- Years active: 1952–2017
- Spouses: Theresa Audette (divorced) Jean Crafton (m. 1973)
- Children: 5
- Presenting career
- Show: The Osgood File
- Network: CBS News Radio
- Country: United States
- Website: The Osgood File at the Wayback Machine (archived June 13, 2018)

Charles Osgood Wood III (January 8, 1933 – January 23, 2024) was an American radio and television commentator, writer, and musician. Osgood was the host of CBS News Sunday Morning, a role he held for over 22 years from April 10, 1994, until September 25, 2016. He also hosted a series of daily radio commentaries: The Osgood File, from 1971 until December 29, 2017.

Osgood narrated Horton Hears a Who!, an animated film released in 2008 based on the book of the same name by Dr. Seuss. He published a memoir of his boyhood in 2004.

== Early life and education ==
Osgood was born in Manhattan, New York City, on January 8, 1933. As a child, he moved with his family to the Liberty Heights neighborhood of Baltimore, Maryland. He attended St. Cecilia High School in Englewood, New Jersey.

His memoir about growing up in Baltimore during World War II is called Defending Baltimore Against Enemy Attack (2004), in which he recounts his perspective at age nine.

Osgood graduated from Fordham University in 1954 with a Bachelor of Science degree in economics.

== Early career ==
=== WFUV Radio ===
While attending Fordham, Osgood volunteered at the university's FM campus radio station, WFUV. He often played piano between records on his shows and frequently collaborated with other students, including future actor Alan Alda and future producer and director Jack Haley, Jr.

=== United States Army Band ===
Immediately after graduating from Fordham University, Osgood was hired as an announcer by WGMS (AM) and WGMS-FM, the classical music stations in Washington, D.C. (today WWRC and WTOP-FM respectively). Shortly afterward, however, he enlisted in the military to be the announcer for the United States Army Band. In 1991, he explained this turn of events in an interview with the Los Angeles Times.

[After college graduation] I went right to work for a classical musical [sic] station in Washington called WGMS. I was an announcer. I learned a lot doing that.

I was about to be drafted in the Army, this was 1954, and I ran into a guy while I was having dinner with a friend of mine and he was dressed in a white uniform, the most fancy uniform this side of the Ritz Hotel. It turned out he was the announcer for the United States Army Band. I asked him when he was getting out and he said within the next few weeks, so the next morning I was parked out at the commanding officer's office. He was impressed with the fact I could pronounce Rimsky-Korsakov. That's how I got the job. I spent three years with the United States Army Band. It was a great experience.

Besides acting as the band's master of ceremonies, he performed as a pianist with the band and sang with the United States Army Chorus.

His roommate, John Cacavas, composed arrangements for the band. They would collaborate on many songs, a relationship that would continue through the 1960s. In 1967, along with U.S. Senator Everett Dirksen (R- Illinois), they shared a Grammy Award for best spoken word performance for their single Gallant Men. As Dirksen read Osgood's patriotic words (originally intended to be sung) about the dignity of duty in the armed forces, it was framed by Cacavas' martial music and stirring choral refrains. In 1967 it peaked at number 16 on the Billboard 200 record chart.

=== Other work ===
Stationed adjacent to Arlington National Cemetery at Fort Myer during his service with the U.S. Army Band, using pseudonyms, Osgood worked as an announcer for radio stations in the Washington area to supplement his income and experience. He hosted the morning show on WEAM (WZHF today) as "Charlie Woods." At WGMS, he called himself "Carl Walden." At WPGC (AM) (WJFK (AM) today), a rock station, he referred to himself as "Chuck Forest."

In September 1955, President Dwight D. Eisenhower suffered a serious heart attack during a vacation in Denver, Colorado, and was confined to a hospital room there until November. During this time, under the auspices of WGMS, Osgood hosted a closed-circuit program of classical music delivered exclusively to the president's room to encourage his relaxation and convalescence.

=== WGMS Radio ===
When his tour with the U.S. Army Band was completed, in October 1957, Osgood returned to WGMS full-time as announcer Charles Wood and as a special assistant to the general manager. Before the end of 1958, WGMS promoted him to program director.

In 1960, credited by name and as a WGMS announcer, he provided introductions and commentary on a six-record album of a collection of thirty-three speeches by President Franklin Delano Roosevelt titled FDR Speaks. Edited by historian Henry Steele Commager, it included a welcome by the president's widow, former first lady Eleanor Roosevelt. Their son Franklin Delano Roosevelt, Jr. recited one of his father's speeches. Billboard magazine reported that FDR Speaks "was one of the most listened-to-attractions" at the 1960 Democratic National Convention which nominated senators John F. Kennedy and Lyndon B. Johnson as its candidates for President and Vice President of the United States.

=== WHCT Television ===
In April 1962, the parent company of WGMS, RKO General, transferred Osgood to Hartford, Connecticut, and promoted him to his first job in television: the general manager of Channel 18, WHCT (WUVN today).

WHCT was the first TV station in the United States to be licensed to use Phonevision, a system developed by Zenith that scrambled the station's picture and sound. This limited viewing to paid subscribers who were issued decoders attached to their television sets and telephone lines. The station offered its subscribers premium programming such as first-run movies, live sporting events, and cultural programs like ballets and symphonies, all with no commercials. Although RKO expected to operate WHCT at a loss for the three years before the Federal Communications Commission was due to renew the station's license, by early 1963, the financial realities became too difficult to bear unabated. In a 1985 interview with Broadcasting magazine, Osgood explained:

[The station] lost money at an alarming rate ... [RKO] let me off the hook very gently. They said, "you're fired."

=== ABC ===
Unemployed at age 30, Osgood turned to one of his Fordham classmates, Frank Maguire, who directed program development at ABC in New York. In 1963, Maguire hired Osgood to be one of the writers and hosts of Flair Reports, which related human interest stories on the ABC Radio Network.

"I went from being the world's youngest station manager to being the world's oldest cub reporter", he quipped in a 1981 interview with People magazine.

Another new Maguire hire for Flair Reports, whom Osgood befriended at ABC, was Ted Koppel.

==== Becoming "Charles Osgood" ====
While he was at ABC, he began using the name "Charles Osgood" because the network already had an announcer named "Charles Woods". In a 2005 interview with Inside Radio, Osgood related the story:

They didn't want to have a Charles Woods and a Charles Wood. When they told me to pick a name, I used my middle name as my last name. It's worked out well and is a little more distinctive and professional.

== Later career at CBS ==
=== Radio ===
Osgood moved over to CBS Radio in 1967 when it became clear, in his words, that he "wasn't going anywhere" at ABC. He worked as a reporter and anchor for WCBS. In August 1967, he anchored the first morning drive shift for WCBS after its conversion to an all-news format. The first day of all-news programming aired on WCBS-FM after an airplane crashed into the AM station's antenna tower on New York's High Island, keeping WCBS off air until a temporary tower could be erected.

Osgood anchored The Osgood File on Westwood One, a daily commentary morning show. It began as a segment on WCBS in 1967 and went national in 1971. Each three-minute Osgood File focused on a single story, ranging from a breaking development of national importance to a whimsical human-interest vignette. Some of those he did in rhyme, which is why he was known as CBS's "Poet in Residence." He continued these broadcasts until December 29, 2017.

=== Television ===
On television, Osgood joined CBS News in 1971. He was a reporter, and served as anchor of the CBS Sunday Night News from 1981 to 1987, co-anchor of the weekday CBS Morning News and frequent news reader on CBS This Morning from 1987 to 1992, as well as occasional anchor of the CBS Afternoon News and the CBS Evening News with Dan Rather.

Osgood hosted CBS News Sunday Morning from April 10, 1994, to September 25, 2016, succeeding the original host Charles Kuralt. Osgood's tenure of twenty-two years as host exceeded Kuralt's fifteen years.

Among Osgood's personal trademarks were his bow tie, his weekly TV signoff "Until then, I'll see you on the radio", and his propensity for delivering his commentaries in whimsical verse. Example: When the Census Bureau invented a designation for cohabitant(s) as "Person(s) of Opposite Sex Sharing Living Quarters", or "POSSLQ", Osgood turned it into a pronounceable three-syllable word and composed a prospective love poem that included these lines, which he later used as the title of one of his books:

There's nothing that I wouldn't do
If you would be my POSSLQ.

Osgood also pronounced the years between 2000 and 2010 as "twenty oh-" as opposed to the more common "two thousand (and)-."

=== End of broadcasting career ===
On December 21, 2017, it was announced Osgood would retire from The Osgood File due to health concerns, ending his broadcast career. His final broadcasts were on December 29, 2017.

== Other works ==
In 1956, Osgood wrote a three-act play called A Single Voice.

Osgood was the narrator in the 2008 animated film Horton Hears a Who!.

Osgood wrote a biweekly syndicated newspaper column. He authored seven books:

- Nothing Could Be Finer Than a Crisis That Is Minor in the Morning (Holt, Rinehart & Winston, 1979)
- There's Nothing That I Wouldn't Do If You Would Be My POSSLQ (Holt, Rinehart & Winston, 1981)
- Osgood on Speaking: How to Think on Your Feet Without Falling on Your Face (William Morrow and Company, 1988)
- The Osgood Files (G.P. Putnam's Sons, 1991)
- See You on the Radio (G.P. Putnam's Sons, 1999)
- Defending Baltimore Against Enemy Attack (Hyperion, 2004).
- A Funny Thing Happened on the Way to the White House (Hyperion, 2008).

He also edited two books:

- Kilroy Was Here (Hyperion, 2001).
- Funny Letters From Famous People (Broadway Books, 2003).

== Personal life and death ==
Osgood's first marriage to Theresa Audette ended in divorce after 16 years. He and his second wife, Jeanne Crafton, had five children, who were raised in Englewood, New Jersey. When they became empty nesters, Osgood and his wife moved to a 12-room duplex on West 57th Street at 7th Avenue in New York City. Osgood also maintained a summer home in Sainte-Maxime on the French Riviera from 1997 until his death, using a basement studio to record his radio broadcasts.

He died from complications of dementia at his home in Saddle River, New Jersey, on January 23, 2024, at age 91. CBS News Sunday Morning dedicated its full January 28, 2024, broadcast to celebrating Osgood's life and work.

== Honors ==
- 1990: National Association of Broadcasters Hall of Fame, radio division
- 2004: Walter Cronkite Award for Excellence in Journalism.
- 2005: Paul White Award, Radio Television Digital News Association

== See also ==
- New Yorkers in journalism
