= Faith Broadcasting Network =

Christian television and radio network, 1975–1983

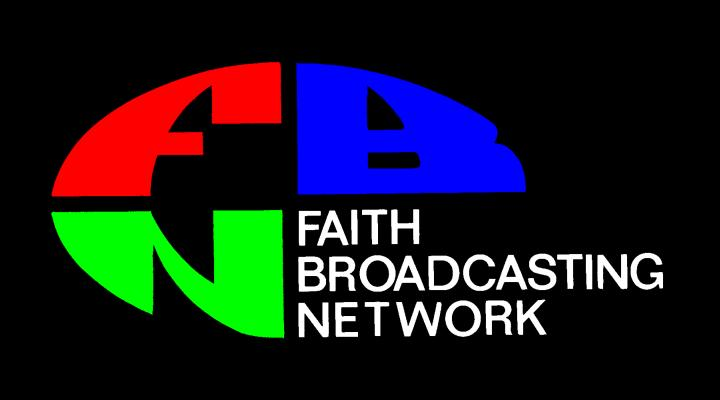
FBN Logo

Faith Broadcasting Network was a Christian television and radio network owned and operated by the Faith Center church in Glendale, California through a religious non-profit corporation, "Faith Center, Inc.".

From 1975 (the TV network's launch) until 1983 (when the TV network ceased operations), Faith Center, Inc. owned and operated WHCT-TV 18 in Hartford, Connecticut (now Univision affiliate WUVN), KVOF-TV 38 in San Francisco (now KCNS), and KHOF-TV (today's KPXN-TV) 30 in San Bernardino, CA; Faith Center, Inc. ran FBN as a two-station (KHOF & KVOF) TV network, with WCHT carrying some of FBN's programming while remaining independent. During the same era, it also owned and operated KHOF-FM, which was licensed in the city of Los Angeles, CA. From the early 1960s to the mid-1970s, it owned and operated KIFM, which was licensed in the city of Bakersfield, CA. Faith Center, Inc. also ran FBN as a two-station (KHOF-FM & KIFM) radio network from late 1971 until 1975.

== Radio stations ==
=== KHOF-FM ===
An FM radio station was the first broadcast property owned by Faith Center and was constructed around 1955. The transmitter site was located on a hill south of the junction of the Ventura and Glendale Freeways. Radio studios were originally in the pipe organ studios of Lorin Whitney in Glendale and later re-located to a rented store-front on Adams at the bottom west side of the transmitter hill. Studios were ultimately located at Faith Center when the church relocated to 1615 South Glendale Avenue in Glendale. The station operated on FM frequency 99.5 MHz with an original power of 16,500 watts and later increased to 100,000 watts. The call letters of KHOF stood for the King’s Herald Of Faith. The original station manager was Jean Carpenter and Chief Engineer, Howard Bollanback. After Howard left, Jack Short became Chief Engineer until 1961.

=== KIFM ===
Around late 1971 Faith Center acquired an FM radio station in Bakersfield, California. The station operated on FM frequency 96.5 MHz with the call sign of KIFM. The call sign was passed along from the previous ownership and the meaning is assumed to have been Kings Inspirational FM, or Kings Inspiration For Man. The KIFM studios in Bakersfield were located in a renovated residence on South H Street. While KIFM had a small staff to program the station there was a radio link established where the programming from KHOF-FM was sent to the KIFM studios. This allowed for some KHOF-FM programming including live church services to be broadcast on the Bakersfield station.

== Television stations ==
=== KHOF-TV ===
One of the early Christian television stations on the west coast was KHOF-TV. Faith Center constructed the station from ground up and signed it on the air in October 1969. The transmission facilities were located on Sunset Ridge, which is about 20 miles east of Mount Wilson, where the major television stations for Los Angeles are located. The station was licensed to San Bernardino and broadcast on UHF television channel 30. Programming originated at the transmitter facility, with video tape and film programming transported daily up the mountain for broadcast. A 30-mile microwave radio link was constructed from Faith Center in Glendale to Sunset Ridge which allowed for live programming, such as church services, telethons and festivals, to be broadcast.

=== WHCT-TV ===
On February 16, 1972 Faith Center further expanded its ministries with the addition of WHCT in Hartford, Connecticut. WHCT was acquired from RKO General and broadcast on UHF television channel 18. RKO donated the station to Faith Center. The call letters were passed along from the RKO ownership. The “W” in the call sign is the typical first letter of the FCC call sign for stations located east of the Mississippi River. While “HCT” without a doubt originally stood for Hartford, Connecticut (CT) there was a dual meaning of Hartford Christian Television. Studios were located at 555 Asylum Street in Hartford.

Unlike the other two television stations, WHCT remained a commercial station most of the broadcast day, at least initially. They signed on late morning, running rejected CBS shows, then religious shows early afternoon, a mix of cartoons, sitcoms, and westerns in the late afternoon and early evening, sports some evenings and Christian programming others. As sports contracts expired, the station gradually added more Christian programming and by 1974 was about half and half. Due to WHCT being across country, there was no economical means the station could be connected to Faith Center for live programming. Christian programming in the form of videotape and film was shipped from Faith Center to WHCT for airing on a part-time basis. By late 1975, the station was about 2/3 Christian, with 1/3 from Faith Center and 1/3 from selling time but was down to about 9 hours a day.

In 1975, Doctor Gene Scott took over Faith Center, and the station gradually cut the budget and stopped renewing most programming. Plans in 1975 were to sell Faith Center's assets, with WHCT to be sold to the Christian Broadcasting Network and become a more conventional commercial independent station, with Christian programming late mornings and prime time. However, the planned sale was canceled in early 1976. That fall, the station was nearly all Christian, but due to financial problems, WHCT was only on the air about 10 hours a day. By the fall of 1977, WHCT aired Christian programming the entire broadcast day (except for an hour), though the entire broadcast day was now down to about 8 hours. From 1977 to 1979, all the outside Christian programming was gradually replaced with strictly religious shows with Gene Scott. In 1980, with satellite technology, WHCT ran Faith Center programming full-time as well but hours were down to only a couple a day.

=== KVOF ===
Faith Center acquired a television station in San Francisco, California and signed it on the air on August 4, 1974. The call sign of KVOF which stood for King’s Voice Of Faith was assigned and the station transmitted on UHF channel 38. Office facilities were located at 601 Tarval Drive in San Francisco, while the transmitter and tower were located atop San Bruno Mountain in Daly City. For several years, Christian programming was shipped to KVOF from Faith Center by ground carrier, similar to how programming was being sent to WHCT in Hartford. In 1978, a microwave radio link was leased that interconnected Faith Center to KVOF, so programming could now originate in Glendale and be broadcast live on KVOF.

== Other assets ==
=== FBN Production Center ===
The demand of increased Christian programming for the five broadcast stations owned by Faith Center was met through the construction of a television production center. Production in the church auditorium was becoming very labor-intensive as it required setting up lights and sets for productions but then having to tear everything down for Wednesday and Sunday church services. This also required the disassembling and reassembly of the rows of folding chairs to accommodate the attendees of the church services. In circa 1973 Faith Center acquired the former Glendale Hardware store located on East Broadway in Glendale. The building was refurbished and converted into a three studio production facility. A microwave link was installed between the production center and Faith Center which allowed live broadcasts to originate from there.

== See also ==
- Faith Broadcasting Network Information Site
- Eugene Scott
