= KIFM (disambiguation) =

KIFM (1320 AM) is a radio station in West Sacramento, California, United States.

KIFM may also refer to:

- KIFM (98.1 FM), former radio station in San Diego, California, from 1978 to 2016, now KXSN
- KIFM (96.5 FM), former radio station in Bakersfield, California, United States, owned by Faith Broadcasting Network
