= Adarand Constructors, Inc. v. Peña =

Adarand Constructors v. Peña
- Supreme Court of the United States

Argued January 17, 1995 Decided June 12, 1995
- Full case name: Adarand Constructors, Incorporated, Petitioner v. Federico Peña, Secretary of Transportation, et al.
- Citations: 515 U.S. 200 (more) 115 S. Ct. 2097; 132 L. Ed. 2d 158; 1995 U.S. LEXIS 4037; 63 U.S.L.W. 4523; 67 Fair Empl. Prac. Cas. (BNA) 1828; 66 Empl. Prac. Dec. (CCH) ¶ 43,556; 78 Rad. Reg. 2d (P & F) 357; 95 Cal. Daily Op. Service 4381; 95 Daily Journal DAR 7503; 40 Cont. Cas. Fed. (CCH) ¶ 76,756

Case history
- Prior: Adarand Constructors, Inc. v. Skinner, 790 F. Supp. 240 (D. Colo. 1992); affirmed sub. nom., Adarand Constructors, Inc. v. Pena, 16 F.3d 1537 (10th Cir. 1994); cert. granted, 512 U.S. 1288 (1994).
- Subsequent: On remand, 965 F. Supp. 1556 (D. Colo. 1997); vacated, sub. nom. Adarand Constructors, Inc. v. Slater, 169 F.3d 1292 (10th Cir. 1999); rev'd, 528 U.S. 216 (2000); affirmed in part, 228 F.3d 1147 (10th Cir. 2000); cert. granted, 532 U.S. 941 (2001); cert. dismissed, sub nom. Adarand Constructors, Inc. v. Mineta, 534 U.S. 103 (2001).

Holding
- All racial classifications, imposed by whatever federal, state, or local government actor, must be analyzed by a reviewing court under a standard of "strict scrutiny", the highest level of Supreme Court review (such classifications are constitutional only if they are narrowly tailored measures that further compelling governmental interests).

Court membership
- Chief Justice William Rehnquist Associate Justices John P. Stevens · Sandra Day O'Connor; Antonin Scalia · Anthony Kennedy; David Souter · Clarence Thomas; Ruth Bader Ginsburg · Stephen Breyer

Case opinions
- Majority: O'Connor, joined by Kennedy; Rehnquist, Thomas (all but Part III–C); Scalia (as consistent with his concurrence)
- Concurrence: Scalia (in part and in judgment)
- Concurrence: Thomas (in part and in judgment)
- Dissent: Stevens, joined by Ginsburg
- Dissent: Souter, joined by Ginsburg, Breyer
- Dissent: Ginsburg, joined by Breyer

Laws applied
- U.S. Const. amends. V, XIV
- This case overturned a previous ruling or rulings
- Fullilove v. Klutznick (1980) (in part) & Metro Broadcasting, Inc. v. FCC (1990)

Adarand Constructors, Inc. v. Peña, 515 U.S. 200 (1995), is a landmark United States Supreme Court case which held that racial classifications, imposed by the federal government, must be analyzed under a standard of "strict scrutiny", the most stringent level of review, which requires that racial classifications be narrowly tailored to further compelling governmental interests. Justice Sandra Day O'Connor wrote the majority opinion of the Court, which effectively overturned Metro Broadcasting, Inc. v. FCC, in which the Court had created a two tiered system for analyzing racial classifications. Adarand held the federal government to the same standards as the state and local governments through a process of "reverse incorporation", in which the Fifth Amendment's Due Process Clause was held to bind the federal government to the same standards as state and local governments are bound under the 14th Amendment.

== Background ==
At the time this case was litigated, many contracts let by agencies of the United States federal government contained financial incentives for the prime contractor to employ subcontractors that were owned or controlled by "socially and economically disadvantaged individuals". The US Small Business Administration or a relevant state agency would certify certain businesses as disadvantaged. That usually meant that the business was owned by racial or ethnic minority groups or by women. In this particular case, the contract stated that

"the contractor shall presume that socially and economically disadvantaged individuals include Black Americans, Hispanic Americans, Native Americans, Asian Pacific Americans, and other minorities...."

In 1989, the US Department of Transportation (DOT) awarded a highway construction contract in Colorado to Mountain Gravel and Construction Company. Mountain Gravel solicited bids for a subcontract for guardrails along the highway. The lowest bid was submitted by Adarand Constructors, with a higher bid being submitted by Gonzales Construction. However, Gonzales Construction had been certified by the Small Business Administration as a disadvantaged business and so Mountain Gravel awarded the subcontract to Gonzales because of financial incentives in the Mountain Gravel's contract for employing disadvantaged businesses. Adarand filed suit in federal court against DOT by arguing that the subcontracting incentive clause, or bonus, that caused Adarand to lose a subcontract was unconstitutional. The federal district court and circuit court ruled in favor of DOT and against Adarand, who then appealed to the US Supreme Court. The case was docketed as Adarand Constructors, Inc. v. Federico Peña, Secretary of Transportation, et al. because Federico Peña was the US Secretary of Transportation at that time. Mountain States Legal Foundation represented Adarand Constructors.

The question before the Court was primarily whether the presumption of disadvantage based on race alone, as well as the consequent allocation of favored treatment, was a discriminatory practice that violated the equal protection clause of the 14th Amendment as well as the Due Process clause of the 5th Amendment.

== Opinion ==
=== Majority ===
In a 5–4 decision, Justice O'Connor wrote for the majority joined in full only by Justice Kennedy while Justice Rehnquist, Justice Thomas and Justice Scalia also joined in part. Justice O'Connor found that while reviewing the process of "reverse incorporation", there is congruency between the 5th and 14th amendment. Justice O'Connor held that regardless of the motive, strict scrutiny analysis applied to all race-based classification for both the State and Federal governments. The court specifically noted that Metro Broadcasting departed from prior cases by holding "benign" racial classifications need only satisfy intermediate scrutiny, which goes against the congruency of the 5th and 14th amendment.

=== Dissent ===
Justice Stevens, joined by Justice Ginsburg and Justice Breyer, dissented from the majority regarding the congruency between the 5th and 14th amendment. Justice Stevens argues that the concept of congruence "ignores important practical and legal differences between federal and state or local decisionmakers...a rule of 'congruence' that ignores a 'purposeful incongruity' so fundamental to our system of government is unacceptable."

== Subsequent developments ==
On September 5, 2005, the U.S. Commission on Civil Rights issued a report finding that, ten years after the Adarand decision, federal agencies still largely fail to comply with the rule in Adarand. Specifically, the Commission found that the Departments of Defense, Transportation, United States Department of Education, Energy, Housing and Urban Development, State, and the Small Business Administration, do not seriously consider race-neutral alternatives before implementing race-conscious federal procurement programs. The Commission found that such consideration is required by the strict scrutiny standard under Adarand and other Supreme Court decisions. Commissioner Michael Yaki dissented from the commission's report, arguing that the commission was taking a "radical step backwards" from the "race-progressive policies" of the past.
