= KILM =

Television station in Inglewood, California

- Inglewood–Los Angeles, California; United States
- City: Inglewood, California (Note: Originally licensed to Barstow, California; moved to Inglewood in 2018.)
- Channels: Digital: 24 (UHF), shared with KPXN-TV; Virtual: 64
- Branding: Bounce TV Los Angeles

Programming
- Affiliations: 64.1: Bounce TV

Ownership
- Owner: Ion Media; (Ion Media License Company, LLC)
- Sister stations: KPXN-TV

History
- First air date: August 15, 1987
- Former call signs: KVVT (1987–1992); KHIZ (1992–2012)
- Former channel numbers: Analog: 64 (UHF, 1987–2009); Digital: 44 (UHF, until May 2018), 38 (UHF, June–December 2018)
- Former affiliations: Independent (1987–1989); ABC (1989–1992); America One; AMGTV; RTV; Multicultural Independent; FilmOn TV (2012−2013); Infomercials (2013−2014); My Combat Channel; SonLife (2014−2017); Punch TV (2017−2018); Corner Store TV (2018); Ion Plus (2018–2021); Grit (2021); Bounce TV (2021–2024); Scripps News (2024); Laff (2024–2025)
- Call sign meaning: FilmOn TV (former LMA partner/programmer)

Technical information
- Licensing authority: FCC
- Facility ID: 63865
- ERP: 1,000 kW
- HAAT: 900 m (2,953 ft)
- Transmitter coordinates: 34°12′36″N 118°4′2.2″W

Links
- Public license information: Public file; LMS

KILM (channel 64) is a television station licensed to Inglewood, California, United States, broadcasting the digital multicast network Bounce TV to the Los Angeles area. It is owned by the Ion Media subsidiary of the E. W. Scripps Company alongside San Bernardino–licensed Ion Television station KPXN-TV (channel 30). Through a channel sharing agreement, the two stations transmit using KPXN-TV's spectrum from an antenna atop Mount Wilson.

== History ==
The station's logo as KHIZ, used until 2012.

KILM began broadcasting on August 15, 1987, as KVVT, originally licensed to Barstow. It was the only independent commercial television station in the Mojave Desert region to provide local news programs. In 1989, the station switched to ABC as a result of the Mojave Desert at the time not receiving a good signal from network-owned KABC-TV (channel 7) in Los Angeles. It became KHIZ in 1992; that same year, KABC boosted its signal to the Mojave Desert, causing channel 64 to disaffiliate from ABC. (A similar situation occurred in Cleveland and Akron, Ohio, where WEWS-TV (channel 5) and then-ABC affiliate WAKR/WAKC (channel 23, now WVPX-TV) both aired ABC programming until 1996). In the mid-2000s, the station changed its format and service area to be transmitted in both the Los Angeles metropolitan area and the Inland Empire region. Multicultural Broadcasting purchased Sunbelt Television, Inc. in 2007. KHIZ eventually incorporated ethnic programming into its schedule.

At one time, KHIZ aired a weekday morning news program, Inland Empire Live, that was produced from the facilities of CBS affiliate WSEE-TV (channel 35) in Erie, Pennsylvania, and distributed to KHIZ via satellite transmission.

FilmOn took over the station's operations under an LMA on September 1, 2012, at which point it became KILM. On November 25, 2013, FilmOn TV was removed and replaced with paid programming. On July 12, 2014, KILM dropped the all-paid programming lineup and replaced it with programming from the SonLife Broadcasting Network, a religious network owned by televangelist Jimmy Swaggart. On August 1, 2017, another LMA was made with a new network, Punch TV, which mainly consisted of public domain and brokered programming.

On June 1, 2018, KILM began channel sharing with Ion Television owned-and-operated station KPXN-TV (channel 30). As KPXN's broadcast radius does not adequately cover Barstow, KILM changed its city of license to Inglewood. Several weeks later, Ion Media Networks agreed to a $10 million purchase of the station, continuing a nationwide pattern of Ion buying out their channel sharing partners to retain full control of their spectrum. Multicultural terminated the Punch TV LMA at the start of August 2018, and began to carry a full schedule of paid programming from Corner Store TV while the sales process with Ion continued. The sale was completed on September 17, 2018, with Ion immediately converting the station to taking over the former channel space of KPXN-DT3 and its Ion Plus feed under KILM's 64.1 virtual channel, which allowed Ion to utilize KILM's must-carry status for main-channel full-market coverage of Ion Plus. Since then, KILM has aired various digital subchannel networks, all of them owned by Scripps Networks.

== Technical information ==
Subchannels of KPXN-TV and KILM
License	Subchannel	Res.	Short name	Programming
KPXN-TV	30.1	720p	ION	Ion Television
KPXN-TV	30.2	480i	CourtTV	Court TV
KPXN-TV	30.3	480i	IONPlus	Ion Plus
KPXN-TV	30.4	480i	Laff	Laff
KPXN-TV	30.5	480i	GameSho	Game Show Central
KPXN-TV	30.6	480i	BUSTED	Busted
KPXN-TV	30.8	480i	HSN	HSN
KILM	64.1	720p	Bounce	Bounce TV

=== Analog-to-digital conversion ===
KHIZ shut down its analog signal, over UHF channel 64, on February 17, 2009, the original target date on which full-power television stations in the United States were to transition from analog to digital broadcasts under federal mandate (which was later pushed back to June 12, 2009). The station's digital signal remained on its pre-transition UHF channel 44, using virtual channel 64.

=== Former translator ===
On May 6, 2009, KHIZ added a low-power analog translator K39GY channel 39 (now KHIZ-LD, channel 2), a former TBN translator in Victorville. It was sold in 2015 to DTV America.
