= Comparative hearing =

Process in American communications law

The comparative hearing process was used by the United States Federal Radio Commission from 1927 to 1934 and its successor, the Federal Communications Commission (FCC), from 1934 to 1994 for the evaluation of mutually exclusive applications for broadcast stations and other licenses. After designating such applications for hearing, commission examiners evaluated criteria to make an initial decision, which could then be appealed to a review board and then the full commission.

A confluence of factors in the 1990s, including a court case invalidating the commission's comparative criteria as arbitrary and capricious; an increased workload that had already led to the implementation of lotteries in certain fields in telecommunications and low-power television; and a desire to reduce the federal budget deficit, led to the FCC ultimately being required by Congress in the Balanced Budget Act of 1997 to auction off broadcast and other licenses to the highest bidder. The FCC had previously been authorized in 1993 to auction non-broadcast licenses.

== History ==
=== Introduction ===
The establishment of the Federal Radio Commission in 1927 introduced evaluation of public interest criteria to determining the allocation of radio frequencies in the United States, a process once governed by first-user considerations in the early days of radio. This continued into the FRC's successor, the Federal Communications Commission. In 1945, in Ashbacker Radio Corporation v. FCC, the Supreme Court of the United States required the FCC to hold comparative hearings for mutually exclusive station applications. The commission standardized comparative criteria in 1965, issuing a policy statement with a consistent list.

=== Reforms and use of alternate processes ===
In September 1983, two years after being authorized, the first low-power TV license lottery was held to select 23 station licensees, with minority-owned applicants given greater weight. At the first lottery, numbers were loaded into one of the four drums that the Selective Service System had once employed for draft lotteries in the Vietnam War. Lotteries were also used to assign cellular telephone licenses from 1984 to 1989, as there were more than 1,400 such licenses to be awarded; however, the use of lotteries encouraged speculators and "application mills", as well as resale of granted licenses.

The FCC reformed the process in 1990 to cut down on "sham applications" that hoped to profit from settlement payments among applicants and make hearings less time-consuming, reducing the number of cases for which the review board held arguments. In a 1998 journal article, economist Thomas Hazlett called the process "socially wasteful and politically charged".

=== Discontinuation ===
On December 20, 1993, a federal appeals court ruled in Bechtel v. FCC that a longstanding comparative criterion, which favored the integration of ownership and management, was arbitrary and capricious. The case had been filed by the losing applicant for a radio station in Selbyville, Delaware, Susan Bechtel. The appeals court found that the FCC could not prove the superior benefits of "integrated" management, which usually materialized as a promise by the owner to move to the community in question to manage the station. As a result, the commission froze all pending comparative cases on February 28, 1994, and began appointing settlement judges to allow applicants to withdraw pending cases. The freeze had an impact on new television networks, such as The WB, that were counting on the commission to approve new stations in varying areas of the United States.

The Balanced Budget Act of 1997 extended the FCC's authority to auction spectrum, first granted by Congress in 1993 to allow the commission to auction non-broadcasting services, to allow radio and television auctions; this came in the context of reducing the federal budget deficit, and the timing of its passage ensured it would have little impact on the transition to digital television in the U.S. The commission urged settlements in frozen comparative cases until September 28, 1999, when parties were ordered to bid on the frequencies they had sought. Most notably affected by Bechtel and its aftermath was 96.5 FM at Biltmore Forest, North Carolina, near Asheville. When no settlement was held in the 11-year battle, for which an initial winning applicant had already started a station under temporary authority, had it rescinded and then restored, it was sent to auction among five remaining parties. The initial station, WZLS, then definitively left the air in February 2002.

== Criteria ==
At the time the FCC abandoned the use of comparative criteria due to the ruling in Bechtel, these were the criteria:

- Diversification of media of mass communication, preferring applicants with fewer or no media interests
- Integration of ownership and management, preferring station owners who proposed to be active in the management of the proposed station
- Local residence in the area to be served and participation in civic activities
- Past broadcast record as a station owner or operator
- Broadcast experience
- Comparative coverage, with a general preference for stations serving more people
- Auxiliary power specification, to provide continued transmission in case of power loss, though this had become a "routine" specification for applicants
- Ethnicity and sex of applicant, with the commission giving preference to minorities active in management. This policy was upheld by Metro Broadcasting, Inc. v. FCC in 1990 but mostly overturned by Adarand Constructors, Inc. v. Peña in 1995.
- Daytime preference, in FM proceedings to owners of daytime-only AM radio stations
