= Phonevision =

Project to create a pay television system

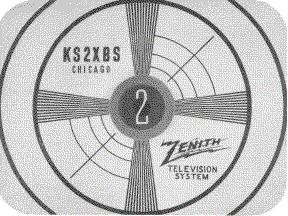
- Country: United States
- Broadcast area: Chicago, New York City and Hartford, Connecticut
- Headquarters: Chicago, Illinois

Programming
- Language: English

Ownership
- Owner: Zenith Radio Company

History
- Launched: 1951
- Closed: 1969

Phonevision was a project by Zenith Radio Company to create the world's first pay television system. It was developed and first launched in Chicago, followed by further trials in New York City and Hartford, Connecticut.

== History ==
Zenith had experimented with pay television as early as 1931, believing that advertising alone could not support television broadcasting as a viable enterprise in the long term. Zenith had originally occupied television channel 1 in Chicago starting on February 2, 1939, when W9XZV went on the air. W9XZV was one of America's first non-mechanical television stations and, until October 1940, the only television station in Chicago. Zenith's allocation was later moved to channel 2. In 1947, Zenith announced a perfected pay television system and selected the name "Phonevision" as the trademark for the concept. In 1950, in preparation for the public pay television test, the experimental station moved from the Zenith factory to the Field Building and became KS2XBS.

In July 1953, Zenith was forced to shut down KS2XBS when WBBM-TV was moved from channel 4 to channel 2 by the Federal Communications Commission as a side effect of channel shuffling in Wisconsin. The KS2XBS station's transmitter was later donated to Chicago's first educational station, PBS member station WTTW (channel 11).

In 1954, Zenith resumed testing in the eastern United States (on WOR-TV in New York City, now WWOR-TV and licensed to nearby Secaucus, New Jersey) and later negotiated foreign contracts in Australia and New Zealand. It also broadcast for a short time in Connecticut. In spite of its failure to gain national success, a significant amount of publicity and advertising for Phonevision was created for a short time.

The Phonevision system was operational on station WHCT in Hartford, Connecticut, for at least five years, ending early in 1968. The station would run conventional (non-subscription) entertainment programming during the day as an "independent" and then switch to Phonevision-encoded programming in the evening.

== Phonevision concept ==
The concept behind Phonevision involved making feature films available to home viewers at $1 per movie ($12.4 adjusted for inflation). Viewers were required to purchase a descrambler unit that sat on top of the television, plugged into the TV's antenna leads and also into the telephone line. Someone wishing to view a movie would call the Phonevision operator, who would add them to the viewer queue. A signal sent via phone lines would allow the box to descramble the signal and at the end of the month, viewers would be billed for the movie on their regular telephone bill. Some of Zenith's 1951 model TV sets were equipped with a special connector for Phonevision and included a section in the owner's manual explaining the Phonevision concept, providing instructions on how to order, and a schedule for film broadcasts.

The Theatre Owners of America called the service a monumental flop. However, according to then Zenith president Eugene F. McDonald, the service was a roaring success. Even though the three films initially available to the first 300 test households were more than two years old, only about 18 percent of Phonevision viewers had seen them at the movies, and 92 percent of Phonevision households reported that they would prefer to see films at home.

== Technical information ==
The system operated by switching a delay line in and out of the video, which chopped the picture into slats (like looking through an open venetian blind). Half of the slats would be shifted to the right by a significant amount. Decoding reversed the process and slid the other slats over the same amount, realigning the picture. The video information was also reversed in phase, exchanging black and white. The audio was processed by "frequency inversion scrambling", shifting the audio spectrum up 2.625 kHz in frequency. This produced audio that sounded much like single sideband radio except that only high frequencies were present.

Decoding of the audio was done by a dual-conversion processor. The audio was first shifted up 31.5 kHz, and then shifted down 34.125 kHz, producing a net "downshift" of 2.625 kHz. 31.5 was double the horizontal sweep frequency of 15.750 kHz, and 34.125 kHz was 13/6 × 15.750, giving a convenient frequency reference. The frequency tolerance was so tight that if encoded audio were recorded during a Phonevision broadcast, and then played back later into a homemade processor running on normal network programming, a slight frequency error could be detected in the restored audio. Also, when the station switched to local sync to run a local commercial, the frequency change could be heard.

One of the major limitations of the Phonevision system was that due to the delay line being switched in and out, color could not be broadcast, as the 3.58 MHz phase lock necessary for NTSC color broadcasting could not be held. This limitation contributed to the demise of the system, along with the FCC authorization of subscription programming in 1969.
