= Fullilove v. Klutznick =

- Supreme Court of the United States

Argued November 27, 1979 Decided July 2, 1980
- Full case name: H. Earl Fullilove, et al. v. Philip M. Klutznick, Secretary of Commerce, et al.
- Citations: 448 U.S. 448 (more) 100 S. Ct. 2758; 65 L. Ed. 2d 902; 1980 U.S. LEXIS 8

Case history
- Prior: Complaint dismissed, Fullilove v. Kreps, 443 F. Supp. 253 (S.D.N.Y. 1977), affirmed, 584 F.2d 600 (2d Cir. 1978); cert. granted, 441 U.S. 960 (1979).

Holding
- U.S. Congress can constitutionally use its spending power to remedy "past discrimination".

Court membership
- Chief Justice Warren E. Burger Associate Justices William J. Brennan Jr. · Potter Stewart; Byron White · Thurgood Marshall; Harry Blackmun · Lewis F. Powell Jr. William Rehnquist · John P. Stevens

Case opinions
- Plurality: Burger, joined by White, Powell
- Concurrence: Powell
- Concurrence: Marshall (in judgment), joined by Brennan, Blackmun
- Dissent: Stewart, joined by Rehnquist
- Dissent: Stevens

Laws applied
- U.S. Const. art. 1 § 8
- Overruled by
- Adarand Constructors, Inc. v. Peña, 515 U.S. 200 (1995) (in part)

Fullilove v. Klutznick, 448 U.S. 448 (1980), was a case in which the United States Supreme Court held that the U.S. Congress could constitutionally use its spending power to remedy the effects of past discrimination. The case arose as a suit against the enforcement of provisions in a 1977 spending bill that required 10% of federal funds going towards public works programs to go to minority-owned companies.

Chief Justice Burger's decision to allow "benign" (as opposed to "invidious") racial classifications under section 5 of the Fourteenth Amendment was controversial. The Marshall plurality argued to uphold the program under an equal protection analysis by applying intermediate scrutiny to benign racial classifications. The Court generally rejected arguments that benign racial classifications stigmatize the minority beneficiaries, burden non-beneficiaries and are overinclusive of minority individuals who may not be in need of a remedy for past discrimination.

Fullilove was overruled in part by Adarand Constructors, Inc. v. Peña.

== Opinion of the Court ==
The Court was deeply divided as to both the rationale for the decision and the outcome. Five separate opinions were filed, none of which commanded the support of more than three members of the Court. Chief Justice Burger wrote a plurality opinion, joined by Justices White and Powell; Justice Powell also wrote a separate concurrence. Justice Marshall delivered an opinion for a concurrence with an entirely different basis in law, joined by Justices Brennan and Blackmun.

The Court held that the minority set-aside program was a legitimate exercise of congressional power, and that under the particular facts at issue, Congress could pursue the objectives of the minority business enterprise program under the Spending Power. The plurality opinion noted that Congress could have regulated the practices of contractors on federally funded projects under the Commerce Clause as well. The plurality further held that in the remedial context, Congress did not have to act "in a wholly 'color-blind' fashion."

== Dissent ==
Two dissenting opinions were written, one by Justice Stewart, joined by Justice Rehnquist, and the other by Justice Stevens. Justice Stevens objected to the congressional procedures to determine the 10% set-aside figure.

== Subsequent history ==
Fullilove v. Klutznick was overruled by Adarand Constructors, Inc. v. Peña. There the Court adopted strict scrutiny for race preference in federal contracting. This brought the standard of review into uniformity with City of Richmond v. J.A. Croson Co., which applied strict scrutiny for race preferences in state and local government contracting.

== See also ==
- List of United States Supreme Court cases, volume 448
