= Metro Broadcasting, Inc. v. FCC =

- Supreme Court of the United States

Argued March 28, 1990 Decided June 27, 1990
- Full case name: Metro Broadcasting, Inc. v. Federal Communications Commission
- Citations: 497 U.S. 547 (more) 110 S. Ct. 2997; 111 L. Ed. 2d 445

Case history
- Prior: Winter Park Communications, Inc. v. FCC, 873 F.2d 347 (D.C. Cir. 1989), affirmed and remanded; Shurberg Broadcasting of Hartford, Inc. v. FCC, 876 F.2d 902 (D.C. Cir. 1989), reversed and remanded.

Holding
- The FCC policies do not violate equal protection since they bear the imprimatur of longstanding congressional support and direction and are substantially related to the achievement of the important governmental objective of broadcast diversity.

Court membership
- Chief Justice William Rehnquist Associate Justices William J. Brennan Jr. · Byron White; Thurgood Marshall · Harry Blackmun; John P. Stevens · Sandra Day O'Connor; Antonin Scalia · Anthony Kennedy

Case opinions
- Majority: Brennan, joined by White, Marshall, Blackmun, Stevens
- Concurrence: Stevens
- Dissent: O'Connor, joined by Rehnquist, Scalia, Kennedy
- Dissent: Kennedy, joined by Scalia

Laws applied
- U.S. Const. amend. XIV
- Overruled by
- Adarand Constructors, Inc. v. Peña, 515 U.S. 200 (1995)

Metro Broadcasting, Inc. v. FCC, 497 U.S. 547 (1990), was a case decided by the Supreme Court of the United States that held that intermediate scrutiny should be applied to equal protection challenges to federal statutes using benign racial classifications for a non-remedial purpose. The Court distinguished the previous year's decision City of Richmond v. J.A. Croson Co., by noting that it applied only to actions by state and local governments. Metro Broadcasting was overruled by Adarand Constructors, Inc. v. Peña, which held that strict scrutiny should be applied to federal laws that use benign racial classifications. This opinion was the last authored by William J. Brennan Jr., the longtime leader of the Court's liberal wing.

== See also ==
- List of United States Supreme Court cases, volume 497
- Fullilove v. Klutznick
