= 1999 term per curiam opinions of the Supreme Court of the United States =

The Supreme Court of the United States handed down eleven per curiam opinions during its 1999 term, which began October 4, 1999 and concluded October 1, 2000.

Because per curiam decisions are issued from the Court as an institution, these opinions all lack the attribution of authorship or joining votes to specific justices. All justices on the Court at the time the decision was handed down are assumed to have participated and concurred unless otherwise noted.

== Court membership ==
Chief Justice: William Rehnquist

Associate Justices: John Paul Stevens, Sandra Day O'Connor, Antonin Scalia, Anthony Kennedy, David Souter, Clarence Thomas, Ruth Bader Ginsburg, Stephen Breyer

== Brancato v. Gunn ==
- Full caption: Donald H. Brancato, Petitioner v. Priscilla F. Gunn, et al.
- Citations: 528 U.S. 1
- Full text of the opinion: opinion in U.S. Reports · Oyez · Cornell

528 U.S. 1
Decided October 12, 1999.
Motion for leave to proceed in forma pauperis denied.

Stevens filed a dissent.

== Antonelli v. Caridine ==
- Full caption: Michael C. Antonelli, Petitioner v. Dale Caridine, et al. Michael C. Antonelli, Petitioner v. United States
- Citations: 528 U.S. 3
- Full text of the opinion: opinion in U.S. Reports · Oyez · Cornell

528 U.S. 3
Decided October 12, 1999.
Motion for leave to proceed in forma pauperis denied.

Stevens filed a dissent.

== Judd v. United States Dist. Court for Western Dist. of Tex. ==
- Full caption: Keith Russell Judd, Petitioner v. United States District Court for the Western District of Texas, et al.
- Citations: 528 U.S. 5
- Full text of the opinion: opinion in U.S. Reports · Oyez · Cornell

528 U.S. 5
Decided October 12, 1999.
Motion for leave to proceed in forma pauperis denied.

Stevens filed a dissent.

== Dempsey v. Martin ==
- Full caption: John B. Dempsey, Petitioner v. Ralph Martin, District Attorney for Suffolk County
- Citations: 528 U.S. 7
- Full text of the opinion: opinion in U.S. Reports · Oyez · Cornell

528 U.S. 7
Decided October 12, 1999.
Motion for leave to proceed in forma pauperis denied.

Stevens filed a dissent.

== Prunty v. Brooks ==
- Full caption: Robert E. Prunty, Petitioner v. W. Brooks, et al.
- Citations: 528 U.S. 9
- Full text of the opinion: opinion in U.S. Reports · Cornell

528 U.S. 9
Decided October 12, 1999.
Motion for leave to proceed in forma pauperis denied.

Stevens filed a dissent.

== Flippo v. West Virginia ==
- Full caption: James Michael Flippo, Petitioner v. West Virginia
- Citations: 528 U.S. 11
- Full text of the opinion: opinion in U.S. Reports · Cornell · Oyez

528 U.S. 11
Decided October 18, 1999.
Circuit Court of West Virginia, Fayette County, reversed and remanded.

== In re Bauer ==
- Full caption: In Re Frederick W. Bauer, Petitioner
- Citations: 528 U.S. 16
- Full text of the opinion: opinion in U.S. Reports · Cornell · Oyez

528 U.S. 16
Decided October 18, 1999.
Motion for leave to proceed in forma pauperis denied.

Stevens filed a dissent.

== Texas v. Lesage ==
- Full caption: Texas, et al., Petitioners v. Francois Daniel Lesage and United States
- Citations: 528 U.S. 18
- Prior history: 158 F. 3d 213
- Full text of the opinion: opinion in U.S. Reports · Cornell · Oyez

528 U.S. 18
Decided November 29, 1999.
Fifth Circuit reversed and remanded.

== Adarand Constructors, Inc. v. Slater ==
- Full caption: Adarand Constructors, Inc., Petitioner v. Rodney Slater, Secretary of Transportation, et al.
- Citations: 528 U.S. 216
- Prior history: 169 F. 3d 1292
- Full text of the opinion: opinion in U.S. Reports · Justia · Oyez

528 U.S. 216
Decided January 12, 2000.
Tenth Circuit reversed and remanded.

== Village of Willowbrook v. Olech ==
- Full caption: Village of Willowbrook, et al., Petitioners v. Grace Olech
- Citations: 528 U.S. 562
- Prior history: 160 F. 3d 386
- Full text of the opinion: opinion in U.S. Reports · Justia · Oyez

528 U.S. 562
Argued January 10, 2000.
Decided February 23, 2000.
Seventh Circuit affirmed.

== See also ==
- List of United States Supreme Court cases, volume 528
