= KPXN-TV =

Television station in San Bernardino, California

- San Bernardino–Los Angeles, California; United States
- City: San Bernardino, California
- Channels: Digital: 24 (UHF), shared with KILM; Virtual: 30

Programming
- Affiliations: 30.1: Ion Television; for others, see § Subchannels

Ownership
- Owner: Ion Media; (Ion Television License, LLC)
- Sister stations: KILM

History
- First air date: October 12, 1969
- Former call signs: KITR (1965–1968; never used on air); KHOF-TV (1969–1983); KAGL (1985–1992); KZKI (1994–1997); KPXN (1997–2009)
- Former channel numbers: Analog: 30 (UHF, 1969–2009); Digital: 38 (UHF, until 2018)
- Former affiliations: Independent (1969–1983, 1985–1992, 1994–1995); Dark (1983–1985, 1992–1994); inTV (1995–1998)
- Call sign meaning: Paxson, as in Paxson Communications (predecessor to Ion Media) or Bud Paxson

Technical information
- Licensing authority: FCC
- Facility ID: 58978
- ERP: 1,000 kW
- HAAT: 900 m (2,953 ft)
- Transmitter coordinates: 34°12′36″N 118°4′2.2″W

Links
- Public license information: Public file; LMS
- Website: iontelevision.com

KPXN-TV (channel 30) is a television station licensed to San Bernardino, California, United States, serving as the Ion Television outlet for the Los Angeles area. It is owned by the Ion Media subsidiary of the E. W. Scripps Company alongside Inglewood-licensed Bounce TV station KILM (channel 64). Through a channel sharing agreement, the two stations transmit using KPXN-TV's spectrum from an antenna atop Mount Wilson.

== History ==
Channel 30 first signed on the air as KHOF-TV on October 12, 1969. It originally operated as a Christian broadcast outreach of the Faith Center Church in Glendale, of which Reverend Raymond Schoch served as the pastor, with Paul Crouch (who would leave in 1972 in order to begin his own Trinity Broadcasting Network) as his assistant and general manager. KHOF was the second full-time Christian television station. WYAH in Virginia Beach was the first Christian station in 1961, but beginning in 1967, that station began a very gradual evolution to a conventional commercial independent television station (which they completed in 1973). KHOF ran a mix of Schoch's own sermons, various televangelists and teaching programs, both local and syndicated. The church already owned and operated KHOF-FM radio (KKLA-FM now transmits on the frequency, but under a different license from KHOF-FM) in Los Angeles. The station began to have competition when their former GM Paul Crouch left in 1972 and acquired newly purchased KLXA-TV (channel 40) in 1974.

A year later, in 1975, Schoch stepped down for health reasons, and would pass away on September 26, 1977. Gene Scott took over the ministry in 1975 and his Christian views were evolving, as reflected in his sermons. As the decade went on, KHOF gradually shifted away from syndicated Christian shows and local Christian programs to only in-house programming from Scott. Their church broke up as well, and the original Faith Center Church eventually shut down and merged with other churches while Scott had his own congregation. By 1980, the station, along with the radio stations and other TV stations owned by Faith Center, was running only Scott's discussions and sermons full-time. By 1981, the Faith Center was renamed the University Network. In the 1980s, KHOF came under the scrutiny of the Federal Communications Commission (FCC) because of its fundraising operations, as well as Scott's refusal to allow the FCC to examine his station's financial records. The FCC eventually revoked KHOF-TV's license. After losing court challenges to the FCC action, KHOF-TV shut down on May 24, 1983. The final broadcast from Scott's channel 30 consisted of a number of cymbal-banging monkey toys termed as "The FCC Monkey Band" playing their mini-cymbals as a final attack against the commission.

In order to keep channel 30 from going dark until a new permanent licensee could be selected from the many applications that the FCC anticipated, they decided to allow an interim broadcaster to operate on the channel. In 1984, Angeles Broadcasting was granted an interim license and in January 1985, returned channel 30 to the air as KAGL. The station continued to broadcast religious programming from Gene Scott as well. Because KAGL utilized the old KHOF transmitter, still owned by Faith Center, KAGL provided Scott four hours of evening time and some daytime hours to continue the Festival of Faith programs he televised on KHOF. In 1992, the FCC shut down KAGL in order to allow new licensee Sandino Communications (an investor group whose name is shorthand for the city of license of San Bernardino) to construct a new transmitter for a planned television station under the KZKI call letters.

The current channel 30 signed on the air on January 7, 1994, as KZKI, airing a mix of religious programs, infomercials, and some movies in the four years between that time and the launch of Pax TV (later i: Independent Television, now Ion Television) on August 31, 1998. Sandino sold KZKI to Paxson Communications (the forerunner to Ion Media Networks) in 1995 for $18 million in cash and the assumption of debt.

KPXN's analog signal on UHF channel 30 was the last television station to transmit from Sunset Ridge in the Mount San Antonio range. At one time, KSCI (channel 18), KDOC-TV (channel 56), and KRCA (channel 62), all three of which now transmit from Mount Wilson, broadcast their signals from Sunset Ridge as well.

Until the expansion of Ion Television's schedule past 1 a.m. in early 2011, KPXN aired one hour of Bible teaching programs nightly at 1 a.m. from the Los Angeles University Cathedral, which was taught by Scott's widow, Melissa Scott. The program was part of Ion's national schedule via a time brokerage agreement.

== Newscasts ==
In the late 1990s, as part of Pax TV's partnership to provide Pax's stations with newscasts from local NBC affiliates, KPXN began airing rebroadcasts of the weekday editions of NBC owned-and-operated station KNBC (channel 4)'s 6 and 11 p.m. newscasts. KPXN branded the 7 p.m. airing of channel 4's 6 p.m. newscast (which aired on a one-hour tape delay) as The Channel 4 News at 6 p.m. on Pax 30, and the 11:30 p.m. airing of that station's late newscast (which aired on a half-hour delay) as The Channel 4 News at 11:30 on Pax 30. KPXN stopped airing the newscasts in 2005, after Pax dissolved its pact with NBC.

== Technical information ==
=== Subchannels ===
Subchannels of KPXN-TV and KILM
License	Subchannel	Res.	Short name	Programming
KPXN-TV	30.1	720p	ION	Ion Television
KPXN-TV	30.2	480i	CourtTV	Court TV
KPXN-TV	30.3	480i	IONPlus	Ion Plus
KPXN-TV	30.4	480i	Laff	Laff
KPXN-TV	30.5	480i	GameSho	Game Show Central
KPXN-TV	30.6	480i	BUSTED	Busted
KPXN-TV	30.8	480i	HSN	HSN
KILM	64.1	720p	Bounce	Bounce TV

=== Analog-to-digital conversion ===
KPXN-TV shut down its analog signal, over UHF channel 30, on June 12, 2009, as part of the federally mandated transition from analog to digital television. The station's digital signal remained on its pre-transition UHF channel 38, using virtual channel 30.

== See also ==
- Eugene Scott
