= KKLA-FM =

Coordinates: 34.224°N 118.063°W

- Los Angeles, California; United States
- Broadcast area: Greater Los Angeles
- Frequency: 99.5 MHz
- Branding: 99.5 KKLA

Programming
- Format: Christian/talk and teaching

Ownership
- Owner: Salem Media Group; (New Inspiration Broadcasting Co., Inc.)
- Sister stations: KRLA; KTIE

History
- First air date: 1985; November 13, 1956 (as KHOF)
- Former call signs: KHOF (1956–1985)

Technical information
- Licensing authority: FCC
- Facility ID: 48453
- Class: B
- ERP: 10,000 watts
- HAAT: 902.0 meters (2,959.3 ft)

Links
- Public license information: Public file; LMS
- Webcast: Listen live
- Website: www.kkla.com

KKLA-FM (99.5 MHz, "99.5 KKLA") is a commercial radio station licensed to Los Angeles, California and serving the Greater Los Angeles area. The station is owned by the Salem Media Group and broadcasts a Christian talk and teaching format. The KKLA-FM studios are located in Glendale and the transmitter is located atop Mount Wilson.

== History ==
The 99.5 FM frequency in Los Angeles has been home to two stations operating under separate licenses, both broadcasting a Christian radio format.

=== KHOF (1956–1985) ===
Originally owned by Pastor Ray Schoch's Faith Center Church in Glendale, California, the station signed on November 13, 1956, with the call letters KHOF. During the 1960s and 1970s, programming consisted of various syndicated ministries and programming produced by Faith Center. In 1975, Gene Scott took over Faith Center and moved properties including KHOF to strictly in-house programming. Some stations were sold. By 1980, Scott's sermons aired around-the-clock. The Federal Communications Commission canceled KHOF's license in September 1982, citing improper conduct on the part of Faith Center, including misappropriation of fundraising proceeds.

=== KKLA-FM (1985–present) ===
KKLA-FM operates on a license separate from that of the former KHOF, first issued in October 1985 to Salem Communications subsidiary New Inspiration Broadcasting with the call sign KKLA. At that time, the station launched a contemporary Christian music (CCM) format for part of the day and Christian talk and teaching for the rest of the day. By 1987, the majority of KKLA's programming consisted of the latter. The station eliminated Christian music by 1990; this void was filled by KFSG (96.3 FM) which began airing a CCM format for most of its broadcast day.

In 1995, the station's call letters changed to KKLA-FM. This was done to accommodate sister station KLFE (1240 AM) in San Bernardino, which changed its callsign to KKLA and simulcast KKLA-FM until 1999.

During part of the day Monday through Saturday, KKLA-FM broadcasts local Christian call-in talk shows that discuss a mix of religious and conservative political issues. At all other times and all day Sunday, the station airs ministries and teaching programs from speakers such as J. Vernon McGee, John F. MacArthur, and Hank Hanegraaff.

KKLA-FM claims to be the most-listened-to-Christian talk radio station in the United States.

== Awards ==
KKLA-FM was honored by the National Association of Broadcasters as its Religious/Gospel station of the year in 1995.

| Year | Awards | Category | Result | Source |
|---|---|---|---|---|
| 1995 | NAB Marconi Radio Awards | Station of the Year, Religious/Gospel | Won | |
