= WHPX-TV =

Television station in New London, Connecticut

- New London–Hartford–New Haven, Connecticut; United States
- City: New London, Connecticut
- Channels: Digital: 28 (UHF); Virtual: 26

Programming
- Affiliations: 26.1: Ion Television; for others, see § Subchannels

Ownership
- Owner: Inyo Broadcast Holdings; (Inyo Broadcast Licenses LLC)

History
- First air date: September 15, 1986
- Former call signs: WTWS (1986–1998)
- Former channel numbers: Analog: 26 (UHF, 1986–2009); Digital: 34 (UHF, until 2009), 26 (UHF, 2009–2019)
- Former affiliations: Independent (1986–1995); inTV (1995–1998)
- Call sign meaning: "Hartford Pax"

Technical information
- Licensing authority: FCC
- Facility ID: 51980
- ERP: 500 kW
- HAAT: 504.83 m (1,656 ft)
- Transmitter coordinates: 41°42′13″N 72°49′55″W

Links
- Public license information: Public file; LMS
- Website: iontelevision.com

WHPX-TV (channel 26) is a television station licensed to New London, Connecticut, United States, serving as the Ion Television affiliate for the Hartford–New Haven market. The station is owned by Inyo Broadcast Holdings, and maintains offices on Shaws Cove in New London and a transmitter on Rattlesnake Mountain in Farmington, Connecticut.

Prior to 2021, WHPX-TV's facilities served as the main studio for Federal Communications Commission (FCC) purposes for sister station WLWC and former sister station WPXQ-TV in Providence, Rhode Island.

== History ==
The station began operation on September 15, 1986, as independent station WTWS, with transmitter in the Oakdale neighborhood of Montville near Lake Konomoc. It was owned by C&S Broadcasting with majority owner Neil Denenberg and ran a low-budget general entertainment format. In 1988, the station took over some programming from WHCT-TV (channel 18, now Univision affiliate WUVN) as a result of that station's financial problems.

In 1990, the station also began to acquire programming that WTXX (channel 20, now WCCT-TV) chose not to renew. It also offered to pick up WTXX's programming inventory in 1992, but WTXX's owner (Renaissance Broadcasting) declined.

The station had added more infomercials to its lineup by 1993. Two years later, it was sold to Paxson Communications, and switched to Paxson's standard schedule of religious programming in the morning, infomercials in the afternoon and evenings, and worship programming overnight after affiliating with inTV. The rights to its programming were acquired by LIN Television, which placed those shows on WTVU (channel 59, now WCTX).

Paxson then began programming WHCT in 1997, and sold WTWS to Roberts Broadcasting. Roberts, in turn, sold the station to DP Media the following year. However, DP Media was owned by—and named for—Devon Paxson, son of Paxson Communications founder Bud Paxson. Paxson then cut its ties with WHCT and took control of WTWS. The station then affiliated with Pax TV (the predecessor to Ion Television) that year, and changed its call letters to WHPX-TV to reflect its affiliation. Paxson bought DP Media in 2000.

From 2001 until 2005, WHPX re-aired newscasts produced by NBC owned-and-operated station WVIT (channel 30).

== Technical information ==
=== Subchannels ===
The station's signal is multiplexed:

Subchannels of WHPX-TV
Subchannel	Res.	Short name	Programming
26.1	720p	ION	Ion Television
26.2	720p	Bounce	Bounce TV
26.3	480i	CourtTV	Court TV
26.4	480i	IONPlus	Ion Plus
26.5	480i	BUSTED	Busted
26.6	480i	GameSho	Game Show Central
26.7	480i	QVC	QVC
26.8	480i	HSN	HSN

=== Analog-to-digital conversion ===
WHPX-TV shut down its analog signal, over UHF channel 26, on February 17, 2009, to conclude the federally mandated transition from analog to digital television. The station's digital signal relocated from its pre-transition UHF channel 34 to channel 26.

In conjunction with the repack of Connecticut television stations on August 2, 2019, WHPX now transmits on channel 28 from Rattlesnake Mountain in Farmington where many Connecticut television station transmitters are located.
