= Channel 39 =

Channel 39 may refer to several television stations:

== Canada ==
The following television stations formerly broadcast on digital or analog channel 39 (UHF frequencies covering 621.25-625.75 MHz) in Canada:

- CBHT-DT in Halifax, Nova Scotia
- CFAP-DT in Quebec City, Quebec
- CJIL-TV-1 in Bow Island, Alberta

== New Zealand ==
- Channel 39 (New Zealand) (also known as Southern Television and formerly Channel 9 and Dunedin Television)

== Philippines ==
- SMNI 39

== See also ==
- Channel 39 TV stations in Mexico
- Channel 39 digital TV stations in the United States
- Channel 39 virtual TV stations in the United States
- Channel 39 low-power TV stations in the United States
