= WCTX =

Television station in New Haven, Connecticut

- New Haven–Hartford, Connecticut; United States
- City: New Haven, Connecticut
- Channels: Digital: 10 (VHF), shared with WTNH; Virtual: 59
- Branding: WCTX-TV

Programming
- Affiliations: 59.1: Independent with MyNetworkTV; 59.2: Charge!

Ownership
- Owner: Nexstar Media Group (sale pending to an unknown third party); (Nexstar Media Inc.)
- Sister stations: WTNH; Tegna: WCCT-TV, WTIC-TV

History
- First air date: April 3, 1995
- Former call signs: WTVU (1995–1996); WBNE (1996–2000)
- Former channel numbers: Analog: 59 (UHF, 1994–2009); Digital: 39 (UHF, until 2018)
- Former affiliations: The WB (1995–2000); UPN (2001–2006)
- Call sign meaning: Connecticut "X", station formerly branded as "The X"

Technical information
- Licensing authority: FCC
- Facility ID: 33081
- ERP: 20.5 kW
- HAAT: 342 m (1,122 ft)
- Transmitter coordinates: 41°25′22.2″N 72°57′4.9″W

Links
- Public license information: Public file; LMS
- Website: www.wtnh.com

WCTX (channel 59) is a television station licensed to New Haven, Connecticut, United States, serving the Hartford–New Haven market. It is programmed primarily as an independent station, but maintains a secondary affiliation with MyNetworkTV. WCTX is owned by Nexstar Media Group alongside ABC affiliate WTNH (channel 8); Nexstar's Tegna subsidiary owns Fox affiliate WTIC-TV (channel 61) and CW station WCCT-TV (channel 20). WCTX and WTNH share studios on Elm Street in downtown New Haven; per a channel sharing agreement, the two stations transmit using WTNH's spectrum from a tower in Hamden, Connecticut.

== History ==
The original construction construction permit for UHF channel 59 in New Haven, Connecticut, was issued by the Federal Communications Commission (FCC) to the Connecticut Radio Foundation, owner of WELI (960 AM), on June 24, 1953. However, the group was never able to get the station on-the-air and sold the permit–which had changed its call sign from WELI-TV to WTVU on November 4, 1965–to Impart Systems on August 22, 1967. In 1971, the then-owner of NBC affiliate WHNB-TV (channel 30, now WVIT) in New Britain built a low-power translator on UHF channel 59 in New Haven (W59AA licensed to West Haven). Although WHNB had boosted its power to cover New Haven a few months earlier, some areas in Southern Connecticut still could not get a good signal from the station.

On April 3, 1995, WTVU finally began broadcasting as a WB affiliate under a local marketing agreement (LMA) with LIN TV, owner of WTNH. Before WTVU's sign on, The WB's programming had been shown on WTNH following its late newscast on Saturday nights (The WB only offered two hours a week of programming at that point); viewers living in Southwestern Connecticut were able to view the network's programs in-pattern via New York City-based superstation WPIX.

Under the terms of the LMA, WTNH bought WTVU's entire broadcast day, giving the station a lineup of strong syndicated programs, mostly barter shows and second runs from WTNH. It also ran classic sitcoms and drama shows such as Hawaii Five-O, Perry Mason, M*A*S*H, I Love Lucy, Happy Days, The Honeymooners, The Andy Griffith Show, The Beverly Hillbillies, I Dream of Jeannie, Bewitched and Gilligan's Island among others that were removed from the schedules of WTXX (channel 20, now WCCT-TV) and WTWS (channel 26, now Ion Television affiliate WHPX-TV) some years back. It also picked up the over-the-air rights to Hartford Whalers hockey games, which aired on the station until the team became the Carolina Hurricanes in 1997.

On April 1, 1996, the station changed its call sign to WBNE (for "WB New England"). After Tribune Broadcasting (a minority owner of The WB) purchased then-UPN affiliate WTXX, WBNE and that station swapped network affiliations on January 1, 2001. With the new network relationship came a call sign change to WCTX calls and use of the on-air identity "The X". That identity was used in lieu of the conventional "UPN (channel number)" branding. LIN TV purchased WCTX outright in 2002. On September 19, 2005, WCTX became known as "UPN 9", highlighting its cable channel position in some areas.

On January 24, 2006, CBS Corporation and the Warner Bros. Entertainment unit of Time Warner announced that UPN and The WB would cease broadcasting and merge their programming inventories to create a new network called The CW. WTXX was chosen as Connecticut's CW affiliate after its owner Tribune announced a ten-year deal with the upcoming network; on April 26, WCTX announced it would join MyNetworkTV (a second new network launched by News Corporation).

MyNetworkTV began broadcasting on September 5, and as a result, the station did not carry the final two weeks of UPN programming, with WTXX carrying the last two UPN editions of WWE Smackdown. With its new network affiliation, the station changed its branding to "MyTV9". As of the 2007–2008 season, Connecticut Huskies men's basketball games aired primarily on WCTX, with select games on WTNH. It also signed a multi-year television deal with the WNBA's Connecticut Sun to broadcast select regular season games.

Until March 31, 2008, WCTX served as the default MyNetworkTV affiliate on Charter Communications cable systems for the Springfield–Holyoke, Massachusetts market as that area did not have an affiliate of its own. On that date, ABC affiliate WGGB-TV added the network as a secondary affiliation on its new Fox-affiliated second digital subchannel. WCTX is still seen on Charter. WCTX was also repeated on W11BJ (channel 11) from a transmitter on Rattlesnake Mountain in Farmington from 2004 until 2006 while LIN TV built a new transmitter for that station and moved its city of license to Springfield as WFXQ-CD (channel 28).

On March 21, 2014, Media General announced that it would purchase LIN Media and its stations, including WTNH and WCTX, in a $1.6 billion merger. The merger was completed on December 19.

On September 8, 2015, Media General announced that it would acquire the Meredith Corporation for $2.4 billion; the combined group would have been renamed Meredith Media General. Because Meredith already owned WFSB, the companies would have been required to sell either WFSB or WTNH–two of the market's top four stations–to comply with FCC ownership rules. However, on January 27, 2016, Nexstar Broadcasting Group announced that it had reached an agreement to acquire Media General, resulting in the termination of Meredith's acquisition by Media General.

On December 3, 2018, Nexstar announced it would acquire the assets of Tribune Media—owner of Fox affiliate WTIC-TV (channel 61) and WCCT-TV—for $6.4 billion in cash and debt. Nexstar was required to sell two of the stations (including one ranking in the top four in ratings) to a separate, unrelated company to comply with FCC ownership rules. On March 20, 2019, it was announced that Nexstar would keep the WTNH/WCTX duopoly and sell the WTIC/WCCT duopoly to McLean, Virginia–based Tegna Inc. as part of the company's sale of nineteen Nexstar- and Tribune-operated stations to Tegna and the E. W. Scripps Company in separate deals worth $1.32 billion.

On August 19, 2025, Nexstar agreed to acquire Tegna for $6.2 billion. The deal was approved and completed on March 19, 2026. As part of the transaction, Nexstar committed to the divestiture of WCTX within two years, along with five other stations in markets where the two companies combined held four TV station licenses.

== Programming ==
Occasionally as time permits, WCTX may air ABC programs normally seen on WTNH in the event Channel 8 is unable to air them because of extended breaking news coverage or locally produced special programming on that station.

WCTX formerly carried LIV Golf through CW Sports, in lieu of WCCT-TV. WCTX formerly carried Boston Red Sox games syndicated from the "Fox 25 Red Sox Television Network".

=== Newscasts ===
Since 2000, WTNH has been producing a nightly prime time newscast at 10 p.m. on channel 59. It has competed right from its April 17, 2000, debut with WTIC-TV's 10 p.m. broadcast, which established itself as the leading prime time newscast in the market since it debuted in 1989. As of the February 2008 ratings period, WTIC's weeknight newscast was the most watched late evening news broadcast in the market, even gathering more viewership than the 11 p.m. newscasts on Connecticut's Big Three stations.

In 2005, WCTX began simulcasting the second hour of WTNH's weekday morning show (at 6 am), followed by a third hour from 7 to 8 a.m. that is seen exclusively on WCTX, except for simulcast Good Morning America cut-ins on WTNH. The second hour was eventually dropped for an unknown reason. The 7 a.m. hour received competition on March 3, 2008, when WTIC launched its own weekday morning newscast. On April 26, 2010, WTNH rebranded from News Channel 8 to News 8. In addition, WTNH began broadcasting its local newscasts in 16:9 widescreen enhanced definition, with WCTX's newscasts being included in the upgrade. On October 4, 2010, WTNH became the third station in the market to begin broadcasting its newscasts in high definition; WCTX's newscasts also made the transition. On March 30, 2020, WTNH planned to launch an expansion of WCTX's prime time newscast to the three-hour entirety of prime time on weeknights and 90 minutes on weekends, presumably pushing back MyNetworkTV programming to the graveyard slot in late night, an increasingly common fate for the service. This quickly shifted to launching on March 16 instead to provide continuing coverage of the local impact of the COVID-19 pandemic.

== Technical information ==
=== Subchannels ===
Subchannels of WTNH and WCTX
License	Subchannel	Res.	Short name	Programming
WTNH	8.1	720p	WTNH-DT	ABC
WTNH	8.2	480i	Rewind	Rewind TV
WTNH	20.4	480i	Quest	Quest (WCCT-TV)
WCTX	59.1	720p	WCTX-DT	Main WCTX programming
WCTX	59.2	480i	CHARGE	Charge!

Broadcast on behalf of another station

Until TheCoolTV was added on WCTX 59.2 in 2010 (which was subsequently dropped on July 15, 2013), the subchannel aired a 24-hour live feed of WTNH's regional weather radar called the "SkyMax Doppler Network". Justice Network aired on WCTX 59.3 from February 2016 until March 2018, when WTIC-TV added it on its 61.4 subchannel. WCTX additionally carried live sports events of local interest from Sinclair's Stadium.

=== Analog-to-digital conversion ===
WCTX shut down its analog signal, over UHF channel 59, on June 12, 2009, as part of the federally mandated transition from analog to digital television. The station's digital signal remained on its pre-transition UHF channel 39, using virtual channel 59. In 2018, WCTX moved its digital signal to VHF channel 10, which it shares with sister station WTNH.

== See also ==
- Channel 9 branded TV stations in the United States
- Channel 39 digital TV stations in the United States
- Channel 59 virtual TV stations in the United States
