= WTXX =

WTXX may refer to:

- WTXX-LD, a low-power television station (channel 29, virtual 34) licensed to Springfield, Massachusetts, United States
- WCCT-TV, a television station (channel 20) licensed to Waterbury, Connecticut, United States, which used the call sign WTXX from 1982 to 2010
