= Pat Sheahan =

Pat Sheahan may refer to:

- Pat Sheahan (Canadian football), Canadian football coach
- Pat Sheahan (publican), New Zealand rugby union player, publican and publisher

== See also ==
- Pat Sheehan (disambiguation)
