= WTIC-TV =

Television station in Hartford, Connecticut

- Hartford–New Haven, Connecticut; United States
- City: Hartford, Connecticut
- Channels: Digital: 34 (UHF); Virtual: 61
- Branding: Fox 61

Programming
- Affiliations: 61.1: Fox; for others, see § Technical information and subchannels

Ownership
- Owner: Tegna Inc., a subsidiary of Nexstar Media Group; (Tegna Broadcast Holdings, LLC)
- Sister stations: WCCT-TV; Nexstar: WTNH, WCTX

History
- First air date: September 17, 1984
- Former call signs: WETG (never used on air)
- Former channel numbers: Analog: 61 (UHF, 1984–2009); Digital: 31 (UHF, 2003–2019)
- Former affiliations: Independent (1984–1986)
- Call sign meaning: Travelers Insurance Company, original owner of WTIC radio

Technical information
- Licensing authority: FCC
- Facility ID: 147
- ERP: 526 kW
- HAAT: 507 m (1,663 ft)
- Transmitter coordinates: 41°42′13″N 72°49′55″W

Links
- Public license information: Public file; LMS
- Website: www.fox61.com

WTIC-TV (channel 61) is a television station in Hartford, Connecticut, United States, serving the Hartford–New Haven market as an affiliate of the Fox network. It is owned by the Tegna subsidiary of Nexstar Media Group alongside CW station WCCT-TV (channel 20); Nexstar owns ABC affiliate WTNH (channel 8), and WCTX (channel 59), an independent station with MyNetworkTV. WTIC-TV and WCCT-TV share studios on Broad Street in downtown Hartford; WTIC-TV's transmitter is located on Rattlesnake Mountain in Farmington.

The station was established in 1984 as an independent station, securing the Fox affiliation at the network's launch in 1986. The affiliation gave the station ratings success and the backing to launch a local newscast. From 2000 to 2013, the station was co-owned with the Hartford Courant, which led to newsroom collaboration and a significant expansion of local news programming as well as legal cases and criticism of the cross-ownership of the newspaper and the TV station. Tegna Inc. acquired WTIC-TV in 2019 as the result of divestitures related to Nexstar's purchase of Tribune Media. When Nexstar and Tegna merged in 2026, the combined company was allowed to keep three licenses in Connecticut.

== History ==
=== Prior use of channel 61 in Hartford ===
Even though ultra high frequency (UHF) channel 61 had been allotted to Hartford since the mid-1960s, it was still not used by a full-power TV station by the end of the 1970s. However, there had been some interest in the allocation. Under the name of Kappa Television Corporation, a man from Rowayton applied in 1965 for a construction permit. His proposed station, WUHF-TV, would have focused on local sports and news coverage. It was intended to launch in 1967, but Kappa was unable to raise the money to build the station in the face of increased costs for color television equipment. As a result, in late 1968, the firm filed to sell its permit to Evans Broadcasting Corporation, a business of Thomas Mellon Evans. The Federal Communications Commission (FCC) approved the deal in April 1970, but Evans never went through with the purchase, and the permit was forfeited in 1971. There was also one group that stated its intention to file for the permit in 1973.

As the full-power allocation of channel 61 lay fallow, the FCC permitted its use by two translator stations during the 1970s. The first was established by Connecticut Public Television (CPTV), which built a translator to improve service to Waterbury in 1973. A second went on the air from Hartford in September 1980, rebroadcasting the programming of Spanish-language station WXTV in the New York City area.

=== Comparative hearing and construction ===
The advent of subscription television (STV) in the late 1970s led a number of applicants to express their interest in channel 61 in Hartford. The first two groups to do so each had plans to introduce STV on their stations: Golden West Broadcasters, the Los Angeles-based media company owned by Gene Autry, and Hartford Television, a subsidiary of the fledgling Sinclair Broadcast Group.

A third company, Arch Communications, entered the bidding in November 1979. Arch was a locally based consortium headed by Arnold Chase, the 28-year-old son of developer David Chase, owner of WTIC AM-FM in Hartford. The minority partners included Edna N. Smith, a Hartford educator; Randall Pinkston, a reporter for Hartford's WFSB (channel 3); and James Grasso, son of Connecticut governor Ella T. Grasso. Arnold Chase had become smitten with independent TV after seeing the depiction of a news crew in the movie The China Syndrome. This consortium was joined by a fourth contender, The Great Hartford County Telecasting Corporation, which was associated with an owner of nursing homes and a man with television and real estate interests in Los Angeles.

The FCC designated these four applications, plus a fifth for a station to be located in nearby Middletown, for comparative hearing in August 1981. Two years later, the commission delivered its ruling and awarded the construction permit to Arch Communications in September 1983. Arch announced it would name its station WETG—in memory of Grasso, who had died in 1981—and laid out plans for an independent station, the market's second after WTXX-TV (channel 20), to begin broadcasting in June 1984. By this time, Pinkston had sold his shares in Arch back to the company. The station began to purchase syndicated programming to fill out its broadcast day, helping to raise prices that Connecticut stations paid for syndicated shows. A 1,339-foot (408 m) tower on Rattlesnake Mountain near Farmington was approved definitively in July 1984.

Less than two months before going to air, channel 61 made one more change. In December 1983, the FCC liberalized its rules around call signs. This allowed David Chase to grant his son permission—with an FCC waiver—to name the station WTIC-TV, allowing the new channel 61 to trade on the WTIC call letters' 60-year heritage in Connecticut. Arnold Chase had wanted to use the WTIC call letters for some time, knowing they would give his new station instant visibility and credibility. However, he had been unable to do so before the rule change. This made channel 61 the second station in Connecticut to bear the WTIC-TV call sign; it had previously been used on channel 3 from its sign-on in 1957 until its sale in 1974 required a rename. The station remained dedicated in Grasso's memory and would use images of Grasso at sign-on and sign-off. The station would also be housed in One Corporate Center, a building owned by David Chase also colloquially known as the "Stilts Building". Channel 61 was cleared by CPTV and the WXTV translator, which moved to channel 47 in advance of WTIC-TV signing on and is today WUTH-CD.

=== Early years ===
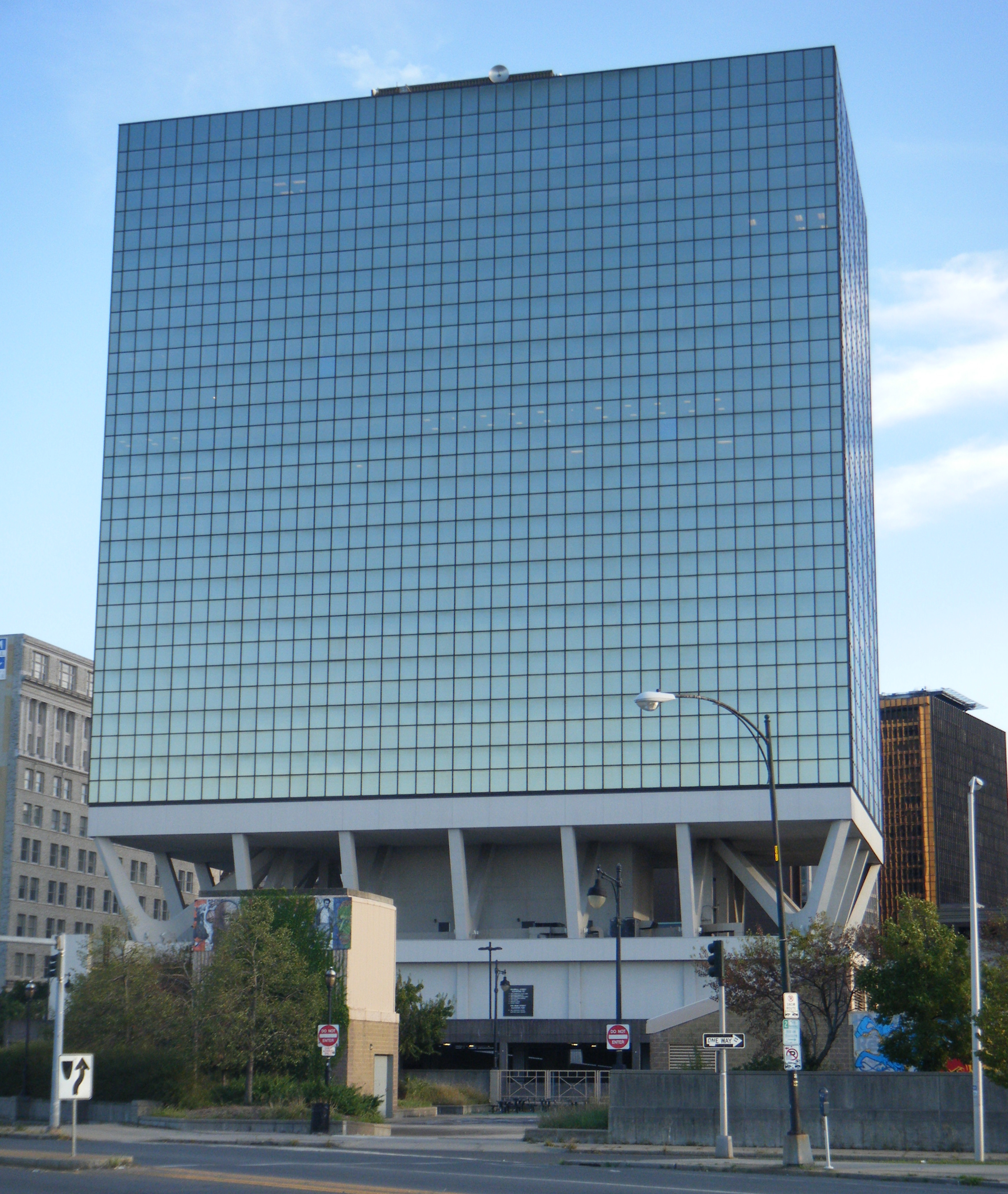
One Corporate Center in Hartford housed WTIC-TV from 1984 to 2009.

After an estimated $10 million in expenditures, WTIC-TV began broadcasting on September 17, 1984. Programming consisted primarily of syndicated reruns, with just one local show on the initial schedule. Jimmy Carter and Eddie Albert were guests of honor at the dedication ceremony, and Bob Steele, who had said the first words on WTIC-TV channel 3 when it started in 1957, did the same for the new WTIC-TV.

WTIC-TV signed on and established itself behind WTXX in the ratings, suffering from the more established syndicated programming inventory of channel 20, which had been an independent outlet since 1982, though such programming purchases as the local rights to air Boston Celtics basketball allowed the new station to make inroads. However, in 1986, an event would change both stations' trajectories. With the start-up of the new Fox network, WTXX and WTIC-TV each pushed to become its Hartford–New Haven affiliate. However, WTXX's signal had more overlap with WNYW, the Fox station in New York, than WTIC-TV, and channel 61 secured the affiliation. Given Fox's limited offerings, channel 61's program schedule remained otherwise unchanged. By 1988, WTIC-TV had surpassed WTXX in prime time and total-day ratings.

A downturn in the independent stations advertising market in the mid-1980s would take its toll on WTIC-TV's finances at the same time channel 61 was merging into Chase Broadcasting, David Chase's business and the owner of the WTIC radio stations. Disputes with syndicators MCA Television and Embassy Television led to sudden program removals. The merger was approved in September 1986 but not completed until a year later due to an internal review. Chase Broadcasting began to buy media properties outside of Connecticut in 1989, most notably other Fox-affiliated stations: WATL in Atlanta, KDVR in Denver, and WXIN in Indianapolis.

=== Renaissance Communications ownership ===
In 1991, Chase Broadcasting announced it would sell some or all of its properties in order to invest in new business ventures in Eastern Europe after the end of the Cold War, particularly successful cable television systems in Poland. While the Chase family would retain the WTIC radio stations for the time being, it sold four of its five Fox affiliates, including WTIC-TV, to Renaissance Communications, a Greenwich company that already owned WTXX. To comply with prevailing FCC regulations, Renaissance sold WTXX to a Roman Catholic non-profit group, Counterpoint Communications; both deals were completed in March 1993. Some syndicated programs from WTXX moved to WTIC-TV. While Renaissance tried to negotiate a local marketing agreement (LMA) with Counterpoint in which it would buy WTXX's entire broadcast day, Counterpoint wanted only a part-time arrangement, and negotiations fell through; eventually, WTXX entered into a part-time LMA with NBC affiliate WVIT (channel 30).

=== Tribune ownership ===
On July 1, 1996, Chicago-based Tribune Broadcasting announced that it would acquire Renaissance Communications for $1.13 billion (equivalent to $2.14 billion in 2025 dollars). Two years later, WTIC-TV replaced WVIT as the LMA partner for WTXX.

Tribune's presence in Connecticut media rapidly grew in the years after the LMA was announced. The company's merger with Times Mirror in 2000 brought the television station under the same corporate umbrella as the Hartford Courant newspaper, while Tribune bought WTXX outright in 2001, setting up a lengthy fight over cross-ownership of the newspaper and the TV station. The original FCC order required Tribune to sell either the newspaper or WTXX within six months, though the cross-ownership of the Courant and WTIC-TV would not need to be considered until the television station's license came up for renewal in 2007. Proposed changes in ownership rules and a circuit court ruling nullifying the same led a federal judge in 2005 to order Tribune to sell WTXX. The FCC then gave Tribune a waiver until 2007, which was later extended, to own that station.

In March 2009, Tribune announced that WTIC-TV and WTXX would relocate their studios and offices into the Courant building on Broad Street in Hartford as part of a multiplatform collaboration between the television and newspaper newsrooms; Richard Graziano, the general manager of the television stations, would also become publisher of the Courant. This was the largest of several similar newspaper-television integrations announced by Tribune in the same period. Connecticut attorney general Richard Blumenthal questioned the combination as violating the waiver. In 2010, two other Connecticut newspapers, the Norwich Bulletin and Record-Journal in Meriden, petitioned the FCC to force the breakup of the Connecticut operation in the context of Tribune's then-pending bankruptcy reorganization.

During Tribune's ownership, WTIC-TV was among the last stations in a top-30 media market to begin broadcasting in digital, requiring an extension from the FCC because it could not meet a 2002 deadline for major network affiliates. This was because the FCC had originally assigned very high frequency (VHF) channel 5, to which WNYW in New York objected; the original digital facility was a low-power operation on UHF channel 31 under special temporary authority. WTIC-TV shut down its analog signal, over UHF channel 61, on June 12, 2009, as part of the digital television transition; the station continued to broadcast digitally on channel 31, using virtual channel 61. The station later relocated its signal from channel 31 to channel 34 on August 2, 2019, as a result of the 2016 United States wireless spectrum auction.

Tribune announced plans to spin off its publishing division into a separate company in 2013; once the split was finalized the next year, WTIC-TV and WCCT-TV remained with the Tribune Company (which retained all non-publishing assets, including the broadcasting, digital media and Media Services units), while its newspapers (including the Courant) became part of the similarly named Tribune Publishing Company. Despite the split, the stations remained in the Courant building.

In 2017, Sinclair Broadcast Group announced it had agreed to purchase Tribune Media for $3.9 billion. The transaction was nullified on August 9, 2018, when Tribune Media terminated the Sinclair deal and filed a breach of contract lawsuit; this followed a public rejection of the merger by FCC chairman Ajit Pai and the commission voting to put the transactions up for a formal hearing.

=== Tegna and Nexstar ownership ===
In the wake of the collapse of the Sinclair deal, Tribune agreed to sell itself to Nexstar Media Group for $6.4 billion. Nexstar already owned two stations in Connecticut—New Haven-based ABC affiliate WTNH and WCTX—requiring that it divest either the New Haven stations or WTIC-TV and WCCT-TV. On March 20, 2019, Tegna Inc. announced it would enter the state and purchase WTIC-TV and WCCT-TV from Nexstar upon consummation of the merger as part of the company's sale of nineteen Nexstar- and Tribune-operated stations to Tegna and the E. W. Scripps Company in separate deals worth $1.32 billion. The sale was completed on September 19, 2019.

Nexstar acquired Tegna in a deal announced in August 2025 and completed on March 19, 2026. As part of the transaction, Nexstar committed to the divestiture of WCTX within two years, along with five other stations, mostly in markets where the two companies combined held four TV station licenses.

== News operation ==
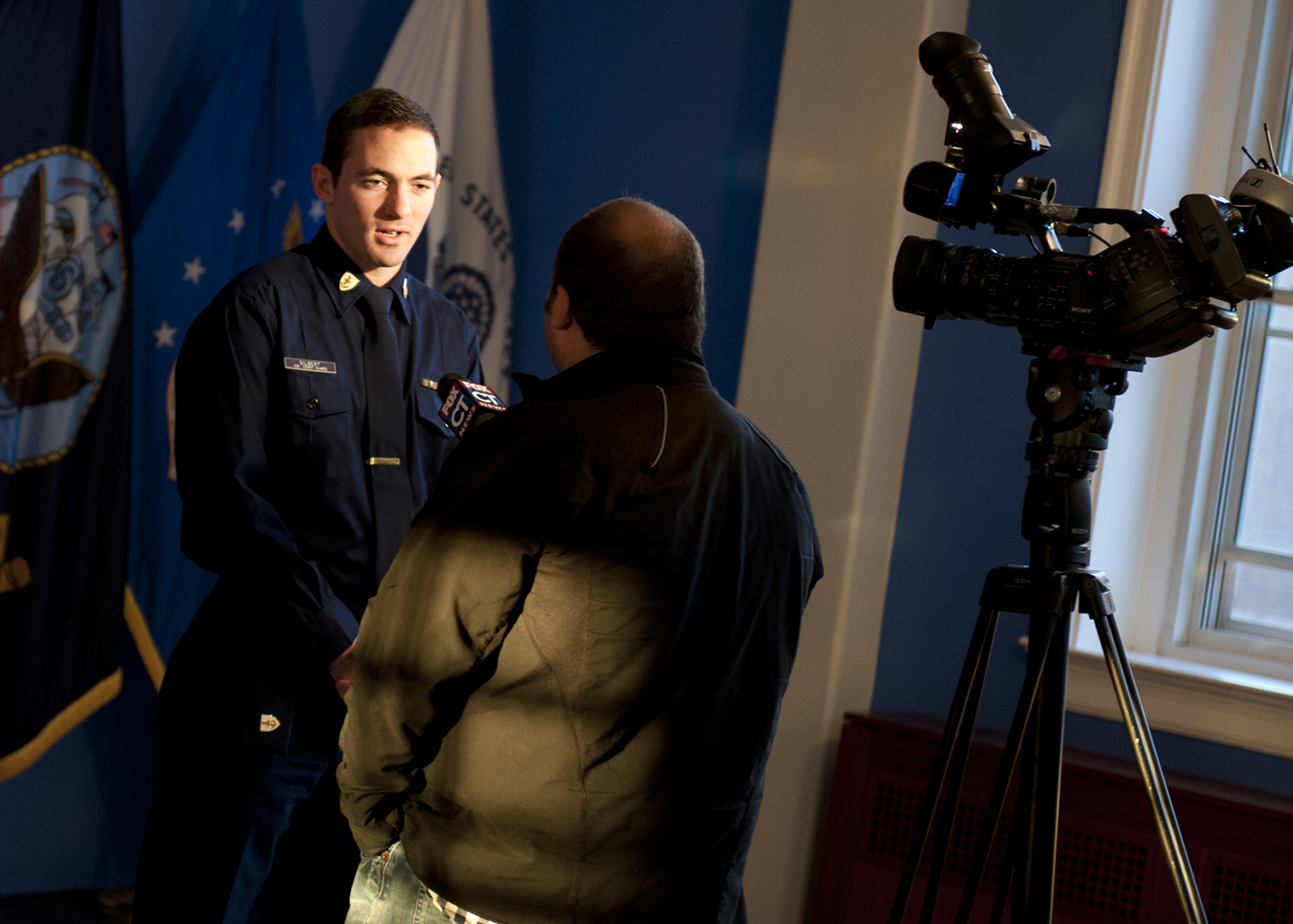
A WTIC-TV reporter conducting an interview in 2012

The creation of a news operation for channel 61, in the mold of the respected WTIC radio newsroom, was an early and long-held goal for Arnold Chase and his team. At the station's dedication ceremony in 1984, general manager Bruce C. Mayer promised, "As soon as we're ready, and that won't be too long, we're going to present the facts with a first-class news operation in the WTIC tradition." A news studio and newsroom were accommodated in the design of the One Corporate Center studios. However, five years passed before WTIC-TV aired a local newscast, in part because the merger into Chase Broadcasting helped afford the financial backing to make it a reality.

In November 1988, W. Vincent Burke, a former news executive with ABC, was hired to serve as the founding news director. Many anchors expressed interest in presenting the new half-hour 10 p.m. newscast, but even network correspondents were turned down to hire Chase's first choice. Longtime Connecticut news anchor Pat Sheehan, who had recently departed WFSB and was working as an investment banker, agreed to become the face of the new WTIC-TV newscast, meshing with the serious news approach favored by Chase.

The WTIC News at Ten began broadcasting in April 1989. Sheehan was joined by Beth Carroll, who had worked at WWLP-TV in Springfield, Massachusetts, on the anchor desk. In its early years, one of the most substantial areas of investment—and impact on the overall market—for WTIC-TV news was weather forecasting. The station had the first private Doppler weather radar in the state, which it trumpeted after a major severe weather outbreak on July 10, three months after the newscast hit the air. A private weather forecasting business, the New England Weather Service, was then created as an adjunct to WTIC radio and television. This led to a competition among Connecticut television stations to invest in new weather forecasting equipment. Ratings began to rise as well. At the start of 1991, the station expanded its newscast to seven days a week.

Under Renaissance, the 10 p.m. newscast expanded from 30 minutes to a full hour in 1995, with the second half hour originally featuring an in-depth feature segment, patterned after Nightline, known as "Tonight in Connecticut". After two months of low ratings, "Tonight in Connecticut" was dropped in August 1995. Sheehan would call the short life and quick demise of the segment "one of my greatest disappointments"; he left in 1999.

Beginning in the late 2000s, WTIC-TV began to increase its news output beyond late news. A two-hour morning newscast, the Fox 61 Morning News, began to air in 2008. After moving in with the Courant, noon and 6 p.m. broadcasts were added, the first in a flurry of new news offerings in the years that followed: an expanded morning newscast, 4 p.m. and 11 p.m. newscasts, weekend morning news, and a 5 p.m. newscast.

In July 2009, news reporter Shelly Sindland filed both state and federal complaints alleging age and gender discrimination in the station's newsroom. The Courant's coverage of this story came under scrutiny. Newsblues, a blog covering the television news business, reported that the newspaper printed WTIC-TV's reaction before it published a story about the complaint, while a blogger who had been a Courant employee at the time noted that he had been told a story had been posted to the website and then removed after a complaint by management. In 2010, the Connecticut Commission on Human Rights and Opportunities found "reasonable cause" in her complaint, a finding the commission made in just four percent of cases it adjudicated in the preceding year.

=== Notable former on-air staff ===
- Steve Berthiaume – weekend sportscaster, 1993–1996
- Jay Crawford – weekend sportscaster, 1992–1993

== Technical information and subchannels ==
WTIC-TV's transmitter is located on Rattlesnake Mountain in Farmington. The station's signal is multiplexed:

Subchannels of WTIC-TV
Subchannel	Res.	Short name	Programming
61.1	720p	WTIC-DT	Fox
61.2	480i	Ant TV	Antenna TV (4:3)
61.3	480i	GetTV	Great (4:3)
61.4	480i	Crime	True Crime Network (4:3)
61.5	480i	NEST	The Nest
20.1	720p	WCCT-DT	The CW (WCCT-TV)

Broadcast on behalf of another station

WCCT-TV serves as Connecticut's ATSC 3.0 (NextGen TV) lighthouse, airing WTIC-TV and other local stations in that format while WTIC-TV broadcasts its main ATSC 1.0 subchannel.
