= Pat Sheehan =

Pat Sheehan may refer to:

- Pat Sheehan (journalist), retired American male journalist
- Pat Sheehan (model) (1931–2006), American actress and model
- Pat Sheehan (Irish republican) (born 1958), Irish republican activist and politician

== See also ==
- Patrick Sheehan (disambiguation)
