= Farmington Mountain =

Mountain in Connecticut, United States

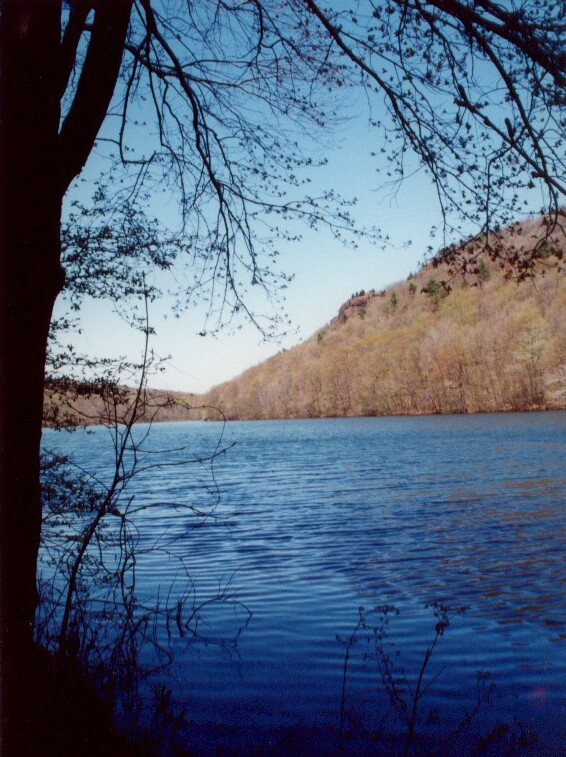
- Shoulder of Farmington Mountain from Farmington Reservoir

Highest point
- Elevation: 502 ft (153 m)
- Coordinates: 41°42′48″N 72°48′56″W

Geography
- Location: Farmington, Connecticut
- Parent range: Metacomet Ridge
- Topo map(s): New Britain, CT

Geology
- Rock age: 200 Ma
- Mountain type(s): Fault-block; igneous

Climbing
- Easiest route: Metacomet Trail

Farmington Mountain, 502 feet (153 m), is a traprock ridge located 9 miles (14 km) southwest of Hartford, Connecticut, in the town of Farmington. It is part of the narrow, linear Metacomet Ridge that extends from Long Island Sound near New Haven, Connecticut, north through the Connecticut River Valley of Massachusetts to the Vermont border. Farmington Mountain is known for its microclimate ecosystems, rare plant communities, and for the historic Hill-Stead Museum. Farmington Mountain is traversed by the 51-mile (82 km) Metacomet Trail.

== Geography ==
Roughly 1.4 miles (2,300 m) long by 0.5 miles (800 m) wide, Farmington Mountain rises steeply 250 feet (76 m) above the town of Farmington to the west. The mountain consists of an upper summit ridge with two distinct peaks and a lower plateau and ledge that hangs just above the center of Farmington. This ledge is contiguous with the lower ridges of Talcott Mountain to the north and Rattlesnake Mountain to the south. The Metacomet Ridge continues north and south from Farmington Mountain over those peaks.

The wooded ridgeline of Farmington Mountain is less distinct that its neighboring peaks on the Metacomet Ridge. Nonetheless, the mountain contains a number of prominent features. The historic Hill-Stead Museum, known for its French Impressionist masterpieces, architecture, and stately grounds is located on the northern part of the ridgeline. The southern half of the mountain is made up of largely wooded cliffs; the Farmington Reservoir is nestled between the ridge high point and the edge of the lower plateau. Other parts of the mountain are occupied by suburban housing.

The east side of Farmington Mountain drains into Trout Brook, then to the Park River, thence into the Connecticut River and Long Island Sound; the west side into the Farmington River, thence to the Connecticut River.

== Geology and ecology ==
Farmington Mountain, like much of the Metacomet Ridge, is composed of basalt, also called traprock, a volcanic rock. The mountain formed near the end of the Triassic Period with the rifting apart of the North American continent from Africa and Eurasia. Lava welled up from the rift and solidified into sheets of strata hundreds of feet thick. Subsequent faulting and earthquake activity tilted the strata, creating the cliffs and ridgeline of Farmington Mountain. Hot, dry upper slopes, cool, moist ravines, and mineral-rich ledges of basalt talus produce a combination of microclimate ecosystems on the mountain that support plant and animal species uncommon in greater Connecticut. Farmington Mountain is also an important raptor migration path. (See Metacomet Ridge for more information on the geology and ecosystem of Farmington Mountain).

== Hill-Stead ==
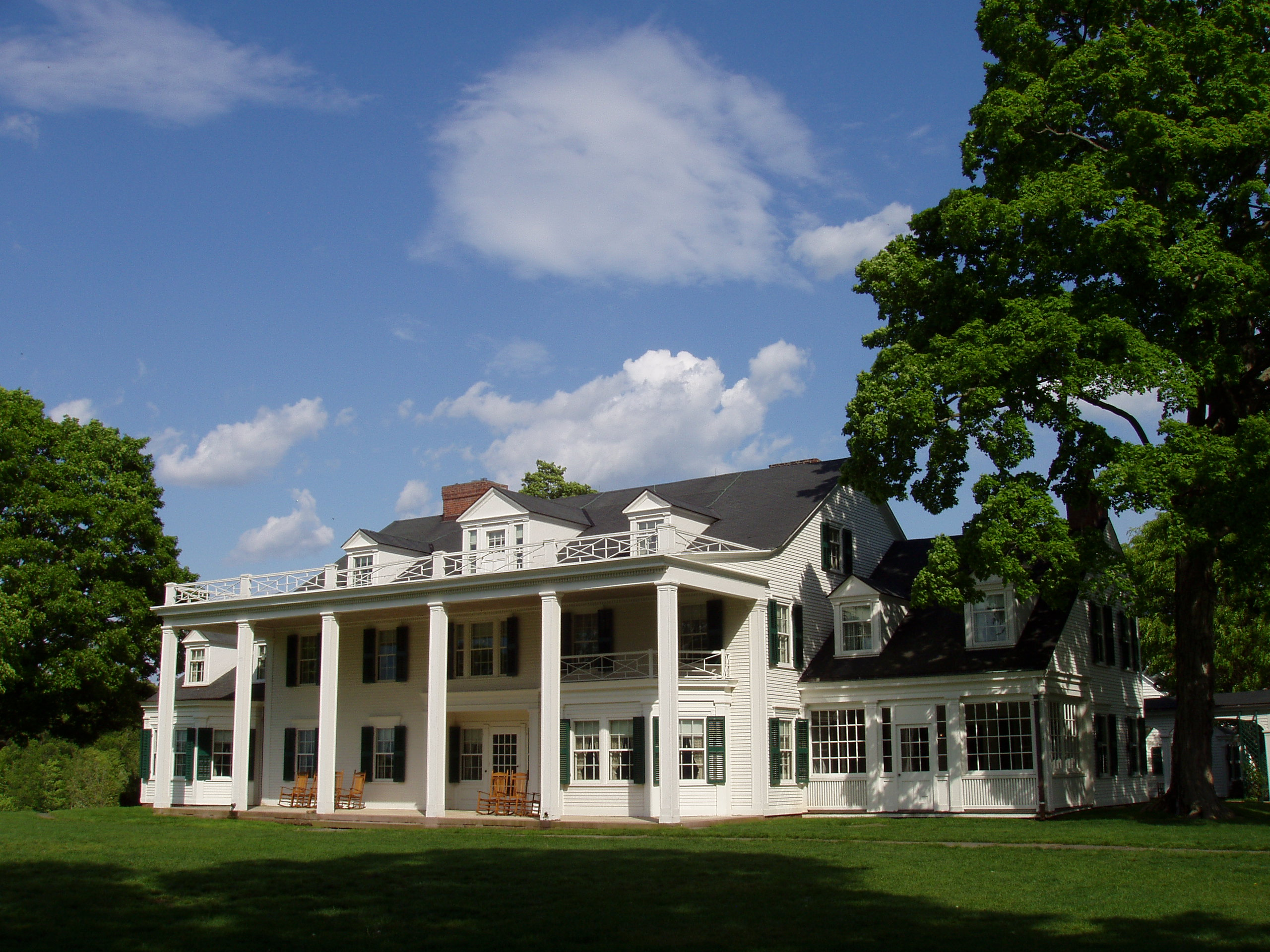
Hill-Stead Museum

Hill-Stead, now a museum, was created on 250 acres (1.0 km^{2}) of Farmington Mountain as a country estate for wealthy industrialist Alfred Atmore Pope, to the designs of his daughter Theodate Pope Riddle in 1901. Theodate inherited the house after her parents deaths, and prior to her own passing in 1946 willed Hill-Stead Museum as a memorial to her parents. She directed that both house and its contents remain intact, not to be moved, lent, or sold.

Hill-Stead comprises 152 acres (0.62 km^{2}). Buildings include the 33,000-square-foot (3,100 m^{2}) Colonial-Revival style Pope-Riddle House; an 18th-century farm house; a carriage garage with an Arts and Crafts theater; and a barn and additional farm buildings. The house is extensively furnished with paintings, prints, and art. Highlights include works by Édouard Manet, Claude Monet, James McNeill Whistler, Albrecht Dürer and postcards including correspondence from Mary Cassatt, Henry James, and James McNeill Whistler.

== Recreation and conservation ==
Both the Hill-Stead Museum and the town of Farmington manage networks of walking paths on the mountain. Farmington Mountain is also traversed by the Metacomet Trail, (maintained by the Connecticut Forest and Park Association), which extends from the Hanging Hills of Meriden, Connecticut, to the Massachusetts border. The walking paths of Hill-Stead Museum, accessible at no charge from the museum parking lot, are open from 7:30 am to 5:30 pm. Guidebooks are available. There is a charge for touring the museum, which is open May–October 10 am-5 pm and November–April: 11 am-4 pm. The Farmington Reservoir Trail, located on the southwest side of the mountain and managed by the town of Farmington, is open to hiking, bird watching, picnicking, snowshoeing, and other passive pursuits. The Metacomet Trail can be accessed from the same trailhead.

The ecosystem and ridgeline of Farmington Mountain are most threatened by development. In 2000, Farmington Mountain was included in a study by the National Park Service for the designation of a new National Scenic Trail now tentatively called the New England National Scenic Trail, which would include the Metacomet-Monadnock Trail in Massachusetts and the Mattabesett Trail and Metacomet Trail trails in Connecticut.

The Farmington Land Trust is active in the conservation of Farmington Mountain and its viewshed. The trust has secured a number of easements on the lower slopes of the mountain and adjacent parts of Metacomet Ridge.

== See also ==
- Hill-Stead Museum
- Metacomet Ridge
- Metacomet Trail
- Adjacent summits:

↓ South

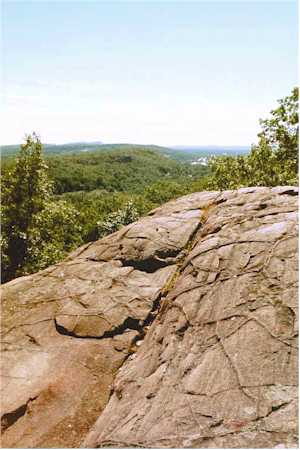
Rattlesnake Mountain

North ↑

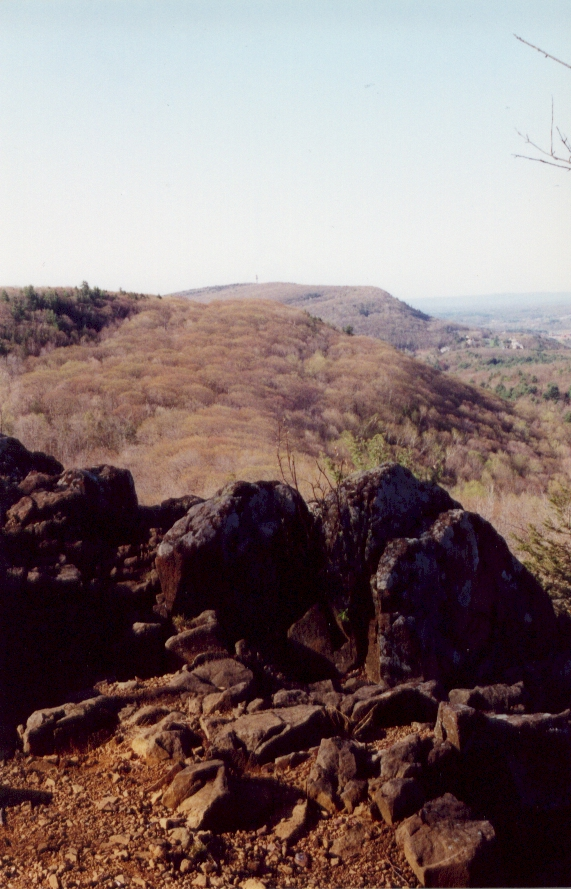
Talcott Mountain
