= Patrick Sheehan =

Patrick Sheehan may refer to:

- Patrick Sheehan (golfer) (born 1969), PGA Tour golfer
- Patrick Augustine Sheehan (1852–1913), Irish Catholic clergyman
- P. A. Ó Síocháin (1905–1995), Irish journalist, author, lawyer and Irish language activist
- P. J. Sheehan (born 1933), Cork politician
- Patrick Sheehan (Illinois politician), member of the Illinois House of Representatives
- Pat Sheehan (Irish republican) (born 1958), Northern Ireland MLA
- Patrick Sheehan (Oregon politician), politician in Oregon
- Patrick Francis Sheehan (1932–2012), Roman Catholic bishop in Nigeria
- "Glen of Aherlow" (song), also known as "Patrick Sheehan", an Irish song by Charles Kickham

== See also ==
- Pat Sheehan (disambiguation)
