= Pat Sheehan (journalist) =

American television news anchor

Pat Sheehan, born c. 1945, is a retired American television news anchor from Connecticut.

Sheehan spent most of his TV journalism career at WTNH-TV from 1971 to 1974 and from 1979 to 1983, WFSB-TV from 1974 to 1979 and from 1983 to 1988, and WTIC-TV from 1989 to 1999, as a reporter, and then an anchor, that made him a Connecticut Television icon. He was inducted into the Society of Professional Journalists Hall of Fame in 1998.

He was inducted into the Boston/New England Chapter of the National Academy of Television Arts and Sciences in 1997.

Sheehan graduated from the University of Connecticut in 1967. He led fundraising campaigns among alumni and later served as chairman of the Board of the UConn Foundation. After serving on the steering committee that developed the university's UConn 2000 rebuilding program, he established an alumni-based grassroots organization called the UConn Advocates to support university initiatives at the Connecticut General Assembly.
