= Channel 59 virtual TV stations in the United States =

The following television stations operate on virtual channel 59 in the United States:

- K18NB-D in Wray, Colorado
- KFRE-TV in Sanger, California
- KPXC-TV in Denver, Colorado
- W30DN-D in Manteo, North Carolina
- WCTX in New Haven, Connecticut
- WDNM-LD in Memphis, Tennessee
- WJEB-TV in Jacksonville, Florida
- WJMB-CD in Butler, Pennsylvania
- WSRG-LD in Scranton, Pennsylvania
- WTVK in Oswego, Illinois
- WVNS-TV in Lewisburg, West Virginia
- WXIN in Indianapolis, Indiana

The following stations, which are no longer licensed, formerly operated on virtual channel 59 in the United States:

- WEMW-CD in Greensburg, Pennsylvania
- WEPA-CD in Pittsburgh, Pennsylvania
- WJPW-CD in Weirton, West Virginia
- WPCP-CD in New Castle, Pennsylvania
