= Kidstime with T. X. Critter =

Local Connecticut television show

- Also known as: Kidstime Express
- Genre: Local children's television series
- Country of origin: United States
- Original language: English

Kidstime (Sunday mornings title) and Kidstime Express (weekday afternoons title) is a local children's television show broadcast by WTXX Channel 20 (now WCCT-TV) in Waterbury, Connecticut, in the 1980s and early 1990s. It was originally hosted by Mike Imfeld and his puppet companions with his cohost being T. X. Critter, operated by puppeteer Don Wunderlee. T. X. was the yellow precursor to ALF, created by the puppeteer Paul Fusco, a few years before the hit NBC TV show of the same name. At some point, Imfeld was replaced by Mike Mozart. Mozart was then later replaced by Lauren DeLisa, who remained the host until the show was canceled in 1993.

== Difference between Kidstime and Kidstime Express ==
The difference between Kidstime and Kidstime Express was in both duration and time slot. Kidstime was a Sunday morning TV show, and Kidstime Express was a weekday afternoon collection of thirty-second spots played between toy commercials that aired along with cartoon episodes of Transformers, G.I. Joe: A Real American Hero, He-Man and the Masters of the Universe, Thundercats, Teenage Mutant Ninja Turtles, Filmation's Ghostbusters, The Real Ghostbusters, Duck Tales, Muppet Babies, The Smurfs, Disney's Adventures of the Gummi Bears, Chip 'n Dale: Rescue Rangers, Silver Hawks, Inspector Gadget, Heathcliff, Dennis The Menace, The Littles, M.A.S.K., Care Bears, Hulk Hogan's Rock 'n' Wrestling, Popples, The Get Along Gang, Denver The Last Dinosaur, The Wuzzles, ALF: The Animated Series, The Adventures of Teddy Ruxpin, COPS, and The Super Mario Bros Super Show.

== Television audience participation ==
Children watching the show at home were encouraged to send in artwork, photographs, and safety tips that would be selectively chosen to be shown or announced on the air. One regular segment was "Funny Face Time" where a picture of a child viewer making a funny face that was sent to the TV station would be shown on the screen. All children whose submissions appeared on the show were given prizes, such as Wiffle Ball and Bat Sets which were and still are manufactured in Connecticut.

== Live appearances ==
T. X. Critter (animated by puppeteer Don Wunderlee) also made live appearances, appearing at least once at Lake Compounce amusement park in Bristol and Southington, Connecticut. Commercials for other amusement parks were frequently shown while Kidstime was on the air, among them ads for Quassy Amusement Park in Middlebury, Connecticut, and Catskill Game Farm in Catskill, New York. T.X. also appeared at the Greater Hartford Fair, the "Kid'rific" Children's Fair in downtown Hartford, the Wadsworth Atheneum art museum, the Connecticut Trolley Museum in East Windsor, the Glastonbury Apple Harvest Festival, the Connecticut International Auto Show at the Hartford Civic Center (now XL Center), and Hebron Elementary School.

== Other notable staff / cast members ==
Jim Henson Productions puppeteer Lisa Buckley created and puppeteered puppets for Kidstime from 1984 to 1986 when the show was entitled JJ, TX & Friends and later changed to Kidstime. The "JJ" in the original title referred to host J. J. Conlon and during his tenure there was a live studio audience and a second puppet on the show named Zeet. When Fusco left the show to work on ALF, Don Wunderlee a CT Punch and Judy puppeteer replaced him as the animator and voice of T. X. Critter.

== Kids Club ==
The show had a "Kids Club" fan club and children would be sent a membership card after joining. One benefit of joining the club was free admission to T. X. Critter's live performances. In October 1983, the fan club had nearly 1,500 members.

== Christmas Special ==
Kidstime also had at least one Christmas special, airing on December 23, 1986.
