= Renaissance Communications =

American television broadcasting company

- Company type: Public
- Industry: Broadcasting, Television
- Founded: 1988; 38 years ago
- Defunct: 1997; 29 years ago
- Fate: Acquired by Tribune Broadcasting
- Successor: Tribune Broadcasting; Nexstar Media Group
- Headquarters: Greenwich, Connecticut, United States
- Key people: Michael Finkelstein

Renaissance Communications Corporation was an American owner of television stations. A venture of Michael Finkelstein and Warburg Pincus headquartered in Greenwich, Connecticut, it specialized in major- and mid-major market independent stations, primarily airing Fox and WB affiliates. The company sold to Tribune Broadcasting in a deal announced in 1996 and closed in 1997.

== History ==
In 1981, Michael Finkelstein, a former Federal Communications Commission attorney and communications lawyer, bought WATR-TV in Waterbury, Connecticut. He retooled it from an NBC affiliate to an independent station. In 1983, Finkelstein joined Odyssey Partners, a New York City–based investment practice, as CEO of its TV stations. The firm acquired WDZL in Miami the next year.

Finkelstein founded Renaissance Communications in 1988 with the backing of Warburg Pincus. The firm acquired KTXL in Sacramento, California, and WPGH-TV in Pittsburgh for a total of $88 million. Renaissance also acquired WDZL and WTXX from Odyssey; in 1990, it bought WPMT in York, Pennsylvania, and the next year, it sold WPGH-TV. Between 1991 and 1992, it attempted to become a publicly traded company twice but failed.

Renaissance acquired four of the five stations owned by Chase Broadcasting in a deal announced in September 1992. This brought KDVR in Denver; WXIN in Indianapolis; WATL in Atlanta; and WTIC-TV in Hartford, Connecticut, into the Renaissance fold. Renaissance could not own both WTXX and WTIC-TV. To comply with prevailing FCC regulations, Renaissance sold WTXX to a Roman Catholic non-profit group, Counterpoint Communications; both deals were completed in March 1993. Some syndicated programs from WTXX moved to WTIC-TV. While Renaissance tried to negotiate a local marketing agreement (LMA) with Counterpoint in which it would buy WTXX's entire broadcast day, Counterpoint wanted only a part-time arrangement, and negotiations fell through; eventually, WTXX entered into a part-time LMA with NBC affiliate WVIT (channel 30).

Renaissance immediately sold WATL to Fox Television Stations. The next year, Renaissance did business with Fox Television Stations again when it agreed to trade KDVR to Fox for KDAF in Dallas. Fox was selling KDAF because it was moving its programming to the previous CBS affiliate, KDFW, as a result of a ten-station affiliation deal with New World Communications. The FCC approved the transaction in July 1995. At the same time, two new national networks, UPN and The WB, launched. Renaissance initially committed WDZL to The WB only to switch to UPN, a move that surprised observers because Finkelstein had previously been a public supporter of The WB. One reason was that it was rumored that Chris-Craft Industries would buy WBFS-TV, a competing Miami station. Renaissance later was forced to reverse course and switch back to The WB when Paramount Stations Group acquired WBFS instead. Also in 1994, Renaissance went public.

On June 30, 1995, Renaissance announced it had agreed to purchase Outlet Communications, which owned two NBC affiliates (WCMH and WJAR) and a third station committed to switching to NBC (WNCN), in a $360 million merger. NBC moved to outbid Renaissance with a $402 million offer and was sued by Renaissance, which claimed "unlawful interference". NBC claimed that Outlet's directors could still consider higher offers in the interest of shareholders; a judge refused to block the NBC bid, which Outlet then accepted. Renaissance received a breakup fee. Renaissance also lost out in its proposal to merge with River City Broadcasting.

Feeling that there were few valuable assets left to buy in a rapidly consolidating market, Finkelstein agreed to sell Renaissance to Tribune Broadcasting for $1.13 billion in a deal announced on July 1, 1996. The FCC approved the transaction in March 1997 but, per newspaper-broadcast cross-ownership limits, ordered Tribune to sell one of WDZL or the South Florida Sun-Sentinel. The deal closed that same month.

== Former stations ==
Stations are arranged in alphabetical order by state and city of license. Ownership of stations by Odyssey Partners is not included.

Stations owned by Renaissance Communications
Media market	State	Station	Purchased	Sold
Sacramento	California	KTXL	1987	1997
Denver	Colorado	KDVR	1993	1995
Hartford	Connecticut	WTXX	1988	1993
Hartford	Connecticut	WTIC-TV	1993	1997
Miami–Fort Lauderdale	Florida	WDZL	1982	1997
Atlanta	Georgia	WATL	1993	1993
Indianapolis	Indiana	WXIN	1993	1997
Harrisburg	Pennsylvania	WPMT	1990	1997
Pittsburgh	Pennsylvania	WPGH-TV	1987	1991
Dallas–Fort Worth	Texas	KDAF	1995	1997
