= WCCT-TV =

Television station in Waterbury, Connecticut

ATSC 3.0 station
- Waterbury–Hartford–; New Haven, Connecticut; United States
- City: Waterbury, Connecticut
- Channels: Digital: 33 (UHF); Virtual: 20
- Branding: Connecticut's CW 20

Programming
- Affiliations: 20.1: The CW; for others, see § Subchannels

Ownership
- Owner: Tegna Inc., a subsidiary of Nexstar Media Group; (Tegna Broadcast Holdings, LLC)
- Sister stations: WTIC-TV; Nexstar: WTNH, WCTX

History
- First air date: September 10, 1953
- Former call signs: WATR-TV (1953–1982); WTXX (1982–2010)
- Former channel numbers: Analog: 53 (UHF, 1953–1962), 20 (UHF, 1962–2009); Digital: 12 (VHF, 2003–2009), 20 (UHF, 2009–2019)
- Former affiliations: DuMont (1953–1956); ABC (secondary 1953–1956, primary 1956−1966); NBC (1966–1982); Independent (1982–1995); UPN (1995–2000); The WB (2001−2006)
- Call sign meaning: CW Connecticut

Technical information
- Licensing authority: FCC
- Facility ID: 14050
- ERP: 220 kW
- HAAT: 517 m (1,696 ft)
- Transmitter coordinates: 41°42′13″N 72°49′55″W

Links
- Public license information: Public file; LMS
- Website: www.fox61.com

WCCT-TV (channel 20) is a television station licensed to Waterbury, Connecticut, United States, serving the Hartford–New Haven market as the local CW outlet. It is owned by the Tegna subsidiary of Nexstar Media Group alongside Fox affiliate WTIC-TV (channel 61); Nexstar owns ABC affiliate WTNH (channel 8) and WCTX (channel 59), an independent station with MyNetworkTV. WCCT-TV and WTIC-TV share studios on Broad Street in downtown Hartford; WCCT-TV's transmitter is located on Rattlesnake Mountain in Farmington, Connecticut.

This station was established in 1953 as WATR-TV, an NBC affiliate originally serving Waterbury, New Haven, and southern Connecticut. Following a transmitter upgrade by Hartford NBC affiliate WVIT in 1982, WATR relaunched as WTXX, a regional independent station and the first station owned by Odyssey Partners, which became Renaissance Communications. WTXX became Connecticut's UPN affiliate in 1995 and switched to The WB in 2001, and became a charter CW affiliate in 2006. Adopting the current WCCT-TV call sign in 2010, it has been managed by WTIC-TV since 1998 and owned by Tegna since 2019. When Nexstar and Tegna merged in 2026, the combined company was allowed to keep three licenses in Connecticut.

== History ==
=== WATR (1953–1966) ===
The station commenced operations on September 10, 1953, as WATR-TV on channel 53, the second UHF station in Connecticut. It was owned by the Thomas and Gilmore families, along with WATR radio (1320 AM). The station's studios and transmitter were located on West Peak in Meriden. At the time, the station's signal only covered Waterbury, New Haven and the southern portion of the state.

WATR-TV was originally a dual secondary affiliate of both DuMont and ABC, sharing them with New Haven-based WNHC-TV (channel 8, now WTNH). DuMont ceased operations in 1955, but WATR-TV continued to carry the network's final regularly scheduled program, Boxing from St. Nicholas Arena, until it was canceled in August 1958; WATR-TV was one of only five remaining DuMont affiliates at the end.

In 1962, the station relocated to UHF channel 20 and moved to a new studio and transmitter site in Prospect, south of Waterbury. Channel 53 was later occupied by WEDN, Connecticut Public Television's outlet in Norwich.

=== NBC affiliate (1966–1982) ===
In August 1966, WATR-TV joined NBC. At the time, the network's primary affiliate in Connecticut, WHNB-TV (channel 30) in New Britain, was hampered by a weak signal in New Haven and the southwestern portions of the state. In the 1970s, the station offered limited local news and instead aired older syndicated programs and religious shows such as The PTL Club when NBC programs were not offered. A notable local production was Journeys to the Mind, a half-hour talk show with host Joel Dobbin, which approached topics of the occult with a serious and sober tone. Journeys ran from 1976 to 1981.

The original Viacom bought WHNB-TV in 1978 and changed its call letters to WVIT. Two years later, after WVIT more than doubled its transmission power to cover New Haven, it became clear that WATR-TV's NBC affiliation was regarded by the network as duplicative. In 1981, the Thomas/Gilmore interests opted to sell channel 20 to a joint venture of Odyssey Television Partners (later to become Renaissance Communications) and Oppenheimer and Company. The sale was announced in May 1981 and gained FCC approval that December.

=== WTXX: independent (1982–1995) ===
With NBC likely departing the station after its last affiliation contract expired to become exclusive to WVIT, the new owners of channel 20 ultimately opted to operate it as an independent station. NBC programming aired on channel 20 for the last time on April 10, 1982. On the next day (Easter Sunday), the station stayed off the air, preparing to relaunch as an independent. On April 12—two days after the NBC affiliation ended—channel 20 returned to the air as WTXX (for "Television XX", with "XX" referring to 20 in Roman numerals), and subsequently became Connecticut's first full-service independent station since Hartford's WHCT-TV (channel 18, now Univision affiliate WUVN) served as an independent from 1957 to 1975.

Soon after taking over, Odyssey replaced channel 20's tiny 250-foot (76 m) tower with a more powerful transmitter that more than doubled its signal and gave it a coverage area comparable with the major network stations in the state. It was a typical general-entertainment independent, carrying off-network series, movies, and cartoons presented by the local children's show Kidstime with T.X. Critter, a puppet created by and puppeteered by Paul Fusco who later created ALF. WTXX also carried some sports, most notably New York Mets telecasts from WOR-TV in New York City and Boston Celtics telecasts from WLVI-TV in Boston. WTXX prospered in its new status, and continued to do so even after WTIC-TV signed on in 1984. WTXX bid for the Fox affiliation two years later, but lost out to WTIC-TV. Channel 20's transmitter was located further south than the other major Connecticut stations, resulting in a significant overlap with Fox flagship WNYW. It could be seen at city-grade strength in Fairfield County, which is part of the New York City market, and provided at least secondary coverage to most of Long Island. Fox opted to affiliate with WTIC-TV, which did not have as large an overlap.

In October 1992, Renaissance Broadcasting sold WTXX to Counterpoint Communications, a non-profit media firm with close ties to the Roman Catholic Archdiocese of Hartford. Renaissance had recently acquired several stations, including WTIC-TV, from Chase Broadcasting, and Federal Communications Commission (FCC) regulations of the time did not allow common ownership of two stations in the same market. However, Renaissance retained the rights to all the programming it bought for WTXX. WTIC-TV wanted to establish a full-time local marketing agreement (LMA) with WTXX, which basically amounted to channel 20 being programmed by its main competitor. Counterpoint balked, wanting only a part-time agreement. Renaissance then moved some of WTXX's stronger shows to WTIC-TV, leaving the station with a considerably weakened schedule.

=== Duopolies and new networks (1995–2006) ===
Renaissance's sale of WTXX to Counterpoint, and Renaissance's subsequent acquisition of WTIC-TV, became official in March 1993. Under the terms of the sale to Counterpoint, WTXX retained few syndicated programs and some movies, and began airing programming from the Home Shopping Network (HSN) for 15 hours a day (including daytime and prime time). In addition, channel 20 would air a daily Catholic Mass, along with other Catholic religious programs, for one hour per day. While trying to negotiate an LMA, WTXX continued to run some Renaissance-owned programming daily from 3 to 7 p.m. free of charge. These shows were the Disney Afternoon cartoon block, double runs of The Cosby Show and Growing Pains on weekdays, and some hour-long first-run syndicated dramas on weekends. Renaissance sold the ad time for the slot and WTXX paid nothing to run the programming during these hours. That July, after negotiations with WTIC collapsed, WTXX entered into a lease agreement with Viacom-owned WVIT, which would provide 27 1/2 hours a week of its programs. Its schedule now included cartoons and children's programs during the morning and afternoon hours, and syndicated shows whose local rights were owned by WVIT during the early evenings. Most of the cartoons were shows WTXX previously had on a barter basis that WTIC could not fit on its schedule. The Disney Afternoon and other syndicated shows previously on WTXX moved to WTIC or stopped airing in the market. HSN programming remained during middays, prime time, and the overnight hours.

WTXX became Connecticut's UPN affiliate on April 3, 1995; for the 2 1/2 months prior to that, Hartford viewers who wanted to watch UPN programming had to view it on cable, by way of WSBK-TV from Boston. This was due in part that Viacom, who operated the station through a LMA with WVIT, owned a minority interest in UPN. Initially, it continued to run Home Shopping Network in prime time on nights without UPN programming. By spring 1996, the station expanded its LMA with WVIT to cover the entire day, except for overnights and the hours when the Catholic Mass aired. By this point, WTXX upgraded its syndicated programming, and HSN was relegated to overnights before being dropped completely.

In 1998, WVIT was sold to NBC, and WTIC (now owned by Tribune Broadcasting) replaced WVIT as WTXX's LMA partner. As part of the deal, some of the shows previously owned by WVIT were kept by WTXX and WTIC. The LMA change caused no impact on WTXX's daily broadcasts of the Catholic Mass, which continues to the present day. Around this time, the station changed its on-air name from "UPN 20" to "Connecticut's 20". It also picked up Boston Red Sox baseball games; the station's feed (with the "Connecticut's 20" bug) was carried during Red Sox highlights airing on ESPN for much of the late 1990s and early 2000s. In 1999, WTXX and WTIC consolidated their operations in a new facility at One Corporate Center on Church Street in Downtown Hartford.

On January 1, 2001, WTXX and WBNE (channel 59, now WCTX) swapped affiliations, with WTXX joining The WB and rebranding as "Connecticut's WB". This was due to the fact that the Tribune Company had a minority interest in The WB. Later that year, Tribune purchased WTXX outright, creating a duopoly with WTIC. Tribune, having already received a temporary waiver from FCC rules barring common ownership of a newspaper and a television station in the same area when it purchased the Hartford Courant a year earlier, received an additional waiver for its purchase of WTXX. Tribune had been seeking a waiver in anticipation of the FCC relaxing its rules to allow such media combinations to exist with the agency's blessing, which would include television duopolies. In March 2005, the FCC requested that Tribune sell WTXX to a new owner, but did not raise any additional pressure outside the request to force a sale or threaten a license forfeiture. In late 2007, the FCC loosened its restrictions on newspaper-broadcast cross-ownership perhaps creating an opening for Tribune (which was purchased by investor Sam Zell in December 2007) to retain WTXX without a waiver.

=== CW affiliate (2006–present) ===
On January 24, 2006, Time Warner announced that the company would merge the operations of The WB with CBS Corporation's UPN (which CBS acquired one month earlier in December 2005 following its split from Viacom), to form a 50/50 joint venture called The CW Television Network. The network signed a ten-year affiliation agreement with Tribune Broadcasting for 16 of the 19 WB affiliates that the company owned at the time, including WTXX.

In August 2008, the station changed its branding from "CW 20" to "txx" in a corporate effort by Tribune to strengthen its CW affiliates' local identities and reduce the dependence on the use of network branding. In June 2009, after 56 years of transmitting from various locations in New Haven County, WTXX shut down its analog transmitter in Prospect, solely using WTIC-TV's tower in Farmington for its full launch into the digital age.

In July 2010, the station changed its branding again to "The CT" with "The CT is the place 2B" slogan; to go along with this branding, the station changed its call letters to WCCT-TV on June 18. In March 2012, the station changed its logo and began to use its calls, WCCT-TV, as its branding, though the station remains a CW affiliate. In August 2018, WCCT-TV returned to the "CW 20" branding.

Tribune announced plans on July 10, 2013, to spin off its publishing division into a separate company, with the split finalized in 2014. WTIC-TV and WCCT-TV remained with the Tribune Company (which also retained all non-publishing assets, including the broadcasting, digital media and Media Services units), while its newspapers (including the Hartford Courant) became part of the similarly named Tribune Publishing Company.

Sinclair Broadcast Group announced it had agreed to purchase Tribune Media on May 8, 2017, for $3.9 billion. Tribune Media terminated the Sinclair deal on August 9, 2018, and filed a breach of contract lawsuit, nullifying the transaction; this followed a vote by the FCC to put the transactions up for a formal hearing and a public rejection of the merger by commission chairman Ajit Pai.

=== Tegna and Nexstar ownership ===
After the collapse of the Sinclair deal, Tribune agreed to sell itself to Nexstar Media Group for $6.4 billion. Nexstar already owned two stations in Connecticut—New Haven-based ABC affiliate WTNH and WCTX—requiring that it divest either the New Haven stations or WCCT-TV and WTIC-TV. Tegna Inc. agreed to purchase WCCT-TV and WTIC-TV from Nexstar on March 20, 2019, upon consummation of the merger, marking Tegna's entry into the state and southern New England. The sale of WCCT-TV and WTIC-TV was part of a larger series of deals involving nineteen Nexstar- and Tribune-operated stations to Tegna and the E. W. Scripps Company worth a combined $1.32 billion. The sale was completed on September 19, 2019.

Nexstar acquired Tegna in a deal announced in August 2025 and completed on March 19, 2026. As part of the transaction, Nexstar committed to the divestiture of WCTX within two years, along with five other stations, mostly in markets where the two companies combined held four TV station licenses.

== Programming ==
=== Newscasts ===
In July 1993, WTXX debuted a nightly 10 p.m. newscast produced by NBC station WVIT, called Connecticut News Live at 10. The news team consisted of WVIT's evening news team (anchors Gerry Brooks and Joanne Nesti, weather from Brad Field, Beasley Reece with sports), along with reporters from WVIT. In 1998, when WTIC replaced WVIT as WTXX's LMA partner, the WVIT-produced broadcasts were replaced with a simulcast of the first half-hour of WTIC's nightly 10 p.m. newscast; on April 24, 2006, the station began simulcasting the entire newscast; if Fox sports programming kept the newscast from starting on time on channel 61, it was aired on WTXX under the title News at Ten.

On December 12, 2009, WTIC, WCCT (then WTXX), and the Hartford Courant moved into new combined newsroom facilities in downtown Hartford, and WTIC rebranded from Fox 61 to Fox CT (a transition completed in July 2010); in addition, WTIC became the second station in the market to begin broadcasting its local newscasts in high definition. The news simulcasts on WCCT were included in the transition.

In June 2010, the station ended the simulcast of WTIC's 10 p.m. newscast. It aired a rebroadcast of WTIC's 11 p.m. newscast at 1 a.m., while the 10 p.m. newscast was re-aired on weekends; these rebroadcasts also included a sports highlight program called Xfinity Sports Desk at 1:45 a.m. on early Sunday and Monday mornings. Originally, this was not simulcast on WTXX but has since been added (the 10 p.m. newscast continues to be shown live on WCCT, if it is preempted on WTIC due to sports programming overruns). The station also carries the 5 a.m. (previously 8 a.m.) hour of WTIC's morning newscast (a previous simulcast of Fox 61 Morning News had aired at one point, but was later dropped). WTIC also produces a weekly public affairs show called The Real Story, which airs Sunday mornings at 8:30 a.m. with a repeat on WCCT at 11 a.m.

Other than simulcasts and default carriage of WTIC's newscasts in the event of Fox Sports programming delays, WCCT does not carry traditional local newscasts produced specifically for the station.

=== Sports programming ===
The station holds the local rights to air 29 New York Mets games from WPIX. WCCT held the local broadcast television rights to the WNBA's Connecticut Sun until 2023. Prior to airing Sun games, the station held the over-the-air broadcast rights to the NHL's Hartford Whalers.

== Technical information ==
=== Subchannels ===
WCCT-TV provides four subchannels, which are carried on the multiplexed signals of other Hartford–New Haven television stations:

Subchannels provided by WCCT-TV (ATSC 1.0)
Subchannel	Res.	Short name	Programming	ATSC 1.0 host
20.1	1080i	WCCT-DT	The CW	WTIC-TV
20.2	480i	Grit	Grit	WFSB
20.3	480i	Comet	Comet	WFSB
20.4	480i	Quest	Quest	WTNH

=== ATSC 3.0 lighthouse service ===
In 2021, WCCT-TV began serving as the ATSC 3.0 (Next Gen TV) lighthouse for Connecticut broadcasters with all subchannels on UHF 33.

Subchannels of WCCT-TV (ATSC 3.0)
Subchannel	Res.	Short name	Programming
3.1	1080p	WFSB-HD	CBS (WFSB)
8.1	1080p	WTNH-DT	ABC (WTNH)
20.1	1080p	WCCT-DT	The CW
30.1	1080p	WVIT-HD	NBC (WVIT)
61.1	1080p	WTIC-DT	Fox (WTIC-TV)

Subchannel broadcast with digital rights management

=== Analog-to-digital conversion ===
WCCT-TV (as WTXX) shut down its analog signal, over UHF channel 20, on June 12, 2009, as part of the federally mandated transition from analog to digital television. The station's digital signal relocated from its pre-transition VHF channel 12 to UHF channel 20 for post-transition operations. The digital signal's change in channel location was necessary to avoid interference with PBS member WHYY-TV in Wilmington, Delaware.
