= WTNH =

Television station in New Haven, Connecticut

- New Haven–Hartford, Connecticut; United States
- City: New Haven, Connecticut
- Channels: Digital: 10 (VHF), shared with WCTX; Virtual: 8
- Branding: News 8

Programming
- Affiliations: 8.1: ABC; 8.2: Rewind TV

Ownership
- Owner: Nexstar Media Group; (Nexstar Media Inc.)
- Sister stations: WCTX; Tegna: WCCT-TV, WTIC-TV

History
- Founded: August 1947
- First air date: June 15, 1948
- Former call signs: WNHC-TV (1948–1971); WTNH-TV (1971–1985)
- Former channel number: Analog: 6 (VHF, 1948–1953), 8 (VHF, 1953–2009)
- Former affiliations: DuMont (1948–1956); CBS (1948–1956); NBC (secondary, 1949–1955); ABC (secondary, 1949–1956); The WB (secondary, 1995)
- Call sign meaning: "Television New Haven/Hartford"

Technical information
- Licensing authority: FCC
- Facility ID: 74109
- ERP: 20.5 kW
- HAAT: 342 m (1,122 ft)
- Transmitter coordinates: 41°25′22.2″N 72°57′4.9″W

Links
- Public license information: Public file; LMS
- Website: www.wtnh.com

WTNH (channel 8) is a television station licensed to New Haven, Connecticut, United States, serving the Hartford–New Haven market as an affiliate of ABC. It is owned by Nexstar Media Group alongside WCTX (channel 59), an independent station with MyNetworkTV; Nexstar's Tegna subsidiary owns Fox affiliate WTIC-TV (channel 61) and CW station WCCT-TV (channel 20). WTNH and WCTX share studios on Elm Street in downtown New Haven; per a channel sharing agreement, the two stations transmit using WTNH's spectrum from a tower in Hamden, Connecticut.

== History ==
=== Local pioneer (1948–1970) ===
WTNH first went on the air on June 15, 1948, as WNHC-TV, originally broadcasting on channel 6. It is the oldest television station in Connecticut. The station was founded by the Elm City Broadcasting Corporation, owners of WNHC radio (1340 AM, now WYBC; and 99.1 FM, now WPLR) in New Haven. Elm City Broadcasting founded WNHC radio in December 1944 and was principally owned by Patrick J. Goode, U.S. postmaster for New Haven; Garo W. Ray, Chief Engineer; and Aldo DeDominicis, a radio salesperson.

WNHC-TV was originally an affiliate of the DuMont Television Network, and claims to have been the first full-time affiliate of that short-lived network. The station originally broadcast from WNHC radio's building on Chapel Street in downtown New Haven. However, with no studio facilities of its own, it could not produce local programming. For a time, WNHC-TV simply rebroadcast the signal of WABD, DuMont's flagship station in New York City. In October 1948, the station added CBS programming to its schedule, and additional secondary affiliations with NBC and ABC in 1949. The station was the first in the country to use videotape for local programming and one of the first to broadcast in color.

When the Federal Communications Commission (FCC)'s Sixth Report and Order ended the four-year freeze on television construction permit awards in 1952, it also reorganized channel allocations to alleviate interference issues. As a result, WNHC-TV changed frequencies and moved to channel 8 in December 1953. The next year, the FCC collapsed New Haven and Hartford into a single market. WNHC-TV shared some CBS programming with New Britain's WKNB-TV (channel 30, now NBC owned-and-operated station WVIT) until 1955, since WKNB's signal was not strong enough to cover New Haven at the time.

In 1956, the WNHC stations were purchased by Philadelphia-based Triangle Publications. Also that same year, WNHC-TV lost its CBS affiliation when that network purchased WGTH-TV in Hartford (channel 18, later WHCT and now Univision affiliate WUVN). This left channel 8 as a sole ABC affiliate, although it shared ABC programming with WATR-TV (channel 20, now WCCT-TV) in nearby Waterbury until 1966. Under Triangle ownership the WNHC stations moved to a new studio facility, on College Street in downtown New Haven, around 1960.

Until the original WTIC-TV (channel 3, now WFSB) signed on from Hartford in September 1957, WNHC-TV was the only station on the VHF dial in Connecticut. Many viewers northeast of Hartford used outdoor antennas to get spotty reception of CBS and NBC programs from Boston, while those southwest of Hartford with outdoor TV antennas got great to excellent reception from their respective New York City flagship stations; indeed, much of southwestern Connecticut is part of the New York City market. By contrast, most of Connecticut got a clear picture and pitch-perfect sound from channel 8.

=== Later years (1970–present) ===
Triangle was forced out of broadcasting in 1970 after then-Pennsylvania Governor Milton J. Shapp complained the company had used its Pennsylvania stations in a smear campaign against him. The WNHC stations were among the first batch to be sold, going to Capital Cities Communications, along with its sister stations in Philadelphia (WFIL-TV) and Fresno (KFRE-TV) in a deal that would be finalized in 1971. However, Capital Cities could not keep the radio stations because of the FCC's then-restrictions on ownership, resulting in WNHC-AM-FM being spun off to separate third parties. WNHC-TV changed its call letters to WTNH-TV on May 1, 1971, not long after Capital Cities officially took over, with the "N" and "H" representing the cities of New Haven and Hartford. The station later relocated for a second time in May 1983, into a studio facility on Elm Street.

On March 19, 1985, Capital Cities announced its intention to buy ABC in a deal that would stun the broadcast industry. As part of the deal, Capital Cities was required to sell WTNH due to a significant signal overlap with ABC's New York flagship station, WABC-TV. Like the other major stations in Connecticut, WTNH's city-grade signal reaches Fairfield County, which is part of the New York City market. It also provides at least grade B coverage to most of Long Island. At the time, the FCC normally did not allow common ownership of two stations with overlapping coverage areas, and would not even consider granting a waiver for a city-grade overlap (the FCC began allowing common ownership of two stations with overlapping coverage areas in 2000). As a result, WTNH was sold to Cook Inlet Television Partners, a subsidiary of Cook Inlet Region, Inc. (an Alaska Native Regional Corporation); the deal was eventually completed in January 1986. During the mid-1980s, the syndicated Sally Jessy Raphael talk show originated from the WTNH studios in New Haven, until the show moved to New York City later in the decade.

Cook Inlet sold WTNH to LIN Television in 1994. When a new UHF station in New Haven, WTVU (channel 59, now WCTX) signed on in April 1995 as a WB affiliate, WTNH began operating the station through a local marketing agreement (LMA); prior to WTVU's launch, WTNH held a temporary secondary WB affiliation, airing its programming (which at the time consisted solely of a Wednesday prime time lineup) Saturdays in late night. In 2001, LIN TV bought WCTX outright. On May 18, 2007, the company announced that it was exploring strategic alternatives that could have resulted in the sale of the company. On March 21, 2014, Media General announced that it would purchase LIN Media and its stations, including WTNH and WCTX, in a $1.6 billion merger. The merger was completed on December 19.

On September 8, 2015, Media General announced that it would acquire the Meredith Corporation for $2.4 billion, with the combined group to be renamed Meredith Media General if the sale had been finalized. Because Meredith already owned WFSB, and the two stations ranked among the four highest-rated stations in the Hartford–New Haven market in total day viewership, the companies would have been required to sell either WTNH or WFSB to comply with FCC ownership rules as well as recent changes to those rules regarding same-market television stations that restrict sharing agreements; WCTX would have been the only one of the three stations affected by the merger that could legally be acquired by Meredith Media General, as its total day viewership ranked below the top-four ratings threshold. However, on January 27, 2016, Nexstar Broadcasting Group announced that it had reached an agreement to acquire Media General (which was approved on January 17, 2017), resulting in the termination of Meredith's acquisition by Media General.

On December 3, 2018, Nexstar announced it would acquire the assets of Chicago-based Tribune Media—owner of Fox affiliate WTIC-TV (channel 61) and CW affiliate WCCT-TV (channel 20)—for $6.4 billion in cash and debt. Nexstar was required to sell two of the stations (including one ranking in the top four in ratings) to a separate, unrelated company to comply with FCC ownership rules. On March 20, 2019, it was announced that Nexstar would keep the WTNH/WCTX duopoly and sell the WTIC/WCCT duopoly to McLean, Virginia–based Tegna Inc. as part of the company's sale of nineteen Nexstar- and Tribune-operated stations to Tegna and the E. W. Scripps Company in separate deals worth $1.32 billion; this would make the WTIC/WCCT duopoly the first television properties in Connecticut and southern New England for Tegna.

On August 19, 2025, Nexstar agreed to acquire Tegna for $6.2 billion. The deal was approved and completed on March 19, 2026. As part of the transaction, Nexstar committed to the divestiture of WCTX within two years, along with five other stations in markets where the two companies combined held four TV station licenses. A temporary restraining order issued one week later by the U.S. District Court for the Eastern District of California, later escalated to a preliminary injunction, has prevented Nexstar from integrating the stations.

== News operation ==
WTNH logo used for news operations

WTNH broadcasts 48 hours of locally produced newscasts each week (with six hours each weekday and 4 1/2 hours each on Saturdays and Sundays) among both WTNH and WCTX. In addition to its main studios, WTNH operates a New London bureau and a Hartford bureau on Columbus Boulevard. Along with regional NOAA National Weather Service radar data, the station operates its own weather radar near its transmitter site in Hamden. Together, these two sources are called "SkyMax Doppler Network". This can be seen via live video with audio from the National Weather Service on WTNH's website.

For over a quarter century, the station used the Action News format made famous at former Philadelphia sister station WFIL-TV (which became WPVI-TV and is now an ABC O&O), using the same "Move Closer to Your World" music and graphics packages as WPVI. WTNH rebranded as NewsChannel 8 in 1996.

For most of the last half-century, WTNH has been a distant runner-up in the overall Connecticut market to dominant WFSB. However, in recent times, it has had to fend off a spirited challenge from WVIT. Since the turn of the millennium, the two stations have regularly traded the runner-up spot. However, WTNH appears to have higher ratings in southern and coastal Connecticut. Historically, WTNH's ratings for news and local programming are far higher in Nielsen's "Metro B" area of New Haven County than "Metro A" containing Hartford County.

Since 2000, WTNH has been producing a nightly prime time newscast at 10 p.m. on WBNE/WCTX. It has competed right from the start with WTIC-TV's 10 p.m. broadcast, which established itself as a viewer favorite since it debuted in 1989. As of the February 2008 ratings period, WTIC's weeknight newscast is actually the most watched late news broadcast in the market, even gathering more viewership than the 11 p.m. newscasts on Connecticut's Big Three stations. In 2005, WCTX began simulcasting the second hour of WTNH's weekday morning show at 6 a.m. followed by a third hour from 7–8 a.m. that was seen exclusively on WCTX, except for simulcast Good Morning America cut-ins on WTNH. The simulcast of the 6 a.m. hour was eventually dropped. The 7 a.m. hour received competition on March 3, 2008, when WTIC launched its own weekday morning show.

Its weekday noon newscast was originally an hour long, but was reduced to 30 minutes on February 23, 2009, when a new lifestyle/entertainment magazine show known as Connecticut Style was added at 12:30 p.m. On January 12, 2015, CT Style was added at 9 a.m. and the noon newscast become an hour long. On April 26, 2010, WTNH re-branded from News Channel 8 to News 8. In addition, WTNH began broadcasting its newscasts in 16:9 widescreen enhanced definition, with WCTX's newscasts and Connecticut Style being included in the upgrade. On October 4, 2010, WTNH became the third station in the market to begin broadcasting its local newscasts in high definition. WCTX's newscasts also made the transition, while Connecticut Style made the transition in 2015.

On January 2, 2017, Good Morning Connecticut was expanded to start at 4:30 a.m. while the noon newscast was shortened to 30 minutes. Connecticut Style was also cut to a half hour.

On March 30, 2020, WTNH planned to launch an expansion of WCTX's prime time newscast to the three-hour entirety of prime time on weeknights and 90 minutes on weekends. This quickly shifted to launching on March 16 instead to provide continuing coverage of the local impact of the COVID-19 pandemic.

== Technical information ==
=== Subchannels ===
Subchannels of WTNH and WCTX
License	Subchannel	Res.	Short name	Programming
WTNH	8.1	720p	WTNH-DT	ABC
WTNH	8.2	480i	Rewind	Rewind TV
WTNH	20.4	480i	Quest	Quest (WCCT-TV)
WCTX	59.1	720p	WCTX-DT	Main WCTX programming
WCTX	59.2	480i	CHARGE	Charge!

Broadcast on behalf of another station

=== Analog-to-digital conversion ===
WTNH shut down its analog signal, over VHF channel 8, on June 12, 2009, as part of the federally mandated transition from analog to digital television. The station's digital signal remained on its pre-transition VHF channel 10, using virtual channel 8.
