= Lake Konomoc (Connecticut) =

Lake in Connecticut, United States

Coordinates: 41°24′56″N 72°11′00″W

Lake Konomoc is a dammed lake near Palmertown in New London County, Connecticut.
