= Channel 39 low-power TV stations in the United States =

The following low-power television stations broadcast on digital or analog channel 39 in the United States:

- K39EO-D in Crescent City, California, to move to channel 19
- K39GH-D in Quanah, Texas, to move to channel 20
- K39JC-D in Butte, Montana, to move to channel 34
- KHGS-LD in Glenwood Springs, Colorado, to move to channel 27
- W39CV-D in Minocqua, Wisconsin, to move to channel 35

The following low-power stations, which are no longer licensed, formerly broadcast on digital or analog channel 39:

- K39AG in Ukiah, California
- K39AK in Vernal, Utah
- K39AN-D in New Mobeetie, Texas
- K39BT in Fraser, etc., Colorado
- K39CD in Lake George, Colorado
- K39CR in Eureka, Utah
- K39DG-D in Trinity Center, California
- K39DV in Emery, Utah
- K39DW in Daggett, etc., California
- K39FR in Delta, etc., Utah
- K39GG in Aitkin, Minnesota
- K39GV in Burley, etc., Idaho
- K39IU-D in Springfield, Missouri
- K39JS-D in Salt Lake City, Utah
- K39JU in Jackson, Wyoming
- K39KE-D in Chalfant Valley, California
- K39LV-D in Perryton, Texas
- KENY-LP in Alamosa, Colorado
- KMAH-LP in Cheyenne, Wyoming
- KTRY-LP in Pinedale, Wyoming
- W39AR in Concord, New Hampshire
- W39BP in Pensacola, Florida
- W39CY-D in Myrtle Beach, South Carolina
- W39DE-D in Cayey, Puerto Rico
- WBCF-LD in Florence, Alabama
- WERI-LP in Keysville, Virginia
- WGMU-LP in Burlington, Vermont
- WHUA-LP in Chattanooga, Tennessee
- WMLD-LD in Brownsville, Florida
- WUDM-LD in Wolcott, Indiana
- WWBK-LP in Richmond, Virginia
