= Channel 39 digital TV stations in the United States =

The following television stations broadcast on digital channel 39 in the United States:

- K39EO-D in Crescent City, California, to move to channel 19
- K39GH-D in Quanah, Texas, to move to channel 20
- K39JC-D in Butte, Montana, to move to channel 34
- KHGS-LD in Glenwood Springs, Colorado, to move to channel 27
- W39CV-D in Minocqua, Wisconsin, to move to channel 35

The following stations, which are no longer licensed, formerly broadcast on digital channel 39:

- K39AN-D in New Mobeetie, Texas
- K39DG-D in Trinity Center, California
- K39IU-D in Springfield, Missouri
- K39JS-D in Salt Lake City, Utah
- K39KE-D in Chalfant Valley, California
- K39LV-D in Perryton, Texas
- W39CY-D in Myrtle Beach, South Carolina
- W39DE-D in Cayey, Puerto Rico
- WBCF-LD in Florence, Alabama
- WMLD-LD in Brownsville, Florida
- WUDM-LD in Wolcott, Indiana
