= Rattlesnake Mountain (Connecticut) =

Mountain in Connecticut

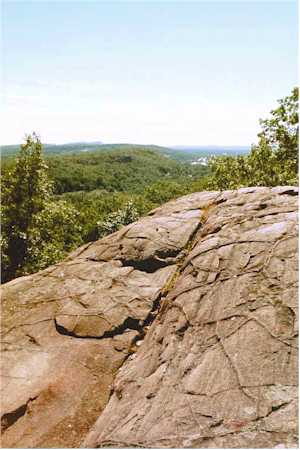
- View from Rattlesnake Mountain

Highest point
- Elevation: 750 ft (230 m)
- Parent peak: 41° 41' 59"N, 72° 49' 58"W
- Coordinates: 41°41′59″N 72°49′58″W

Geography
- Location: Farmington, Connecticut
- Parent range: Metacomet Ridge

Geology
- Rock age: 200 Ma
- Mountain type(s): Fault-block; igneous

Climbing
- Easiest route: Metacomet Trail

Rattlesnake Mountain is a traprock mountain, 750 feet (230 m) above sea level, located 9 miles (14 km) southwest of Hartford, Connecticut, in the town of Farmington. It is part of the narrow, linear Metacomet Ridge that extends from Long Island Sound near New Haven, Connecticut, north through the Connecticut River Valley of Massachusetts to the Vermont border. Rattlesnake Mountain, a popular outdoor recreation resource of the metropolitan Hartford area, is known for its cliff-top scenic vistas, unique microclimate ecosystems, and rare plant communities. Will Warren's Den, a boulder cave located on the mountain, is a local historic site. Rattlesnake Mountain is traversed by the 51-mile (82 km) Metacomet Trail.

== Geography ==
Roughly 1 mile (1.6 km) in diameter, Rattlesnake Mountain rises steeply 500 feet (150 m) above the Farmington River valley to the west. The mountain consists of an upper summit cone that descends into a series of tiered ridges which become contiguous with the Metacomet Ridge on Pinnacle Rock to the south and Farmington Mountain to the north.

A small traprock quarry, 0.4 miles (600 m) wide, occupies the northeast side of the mountain, and a suburban development the southwest side. Three broadcasting towers (WTIC-TV, WHPX-TV and WVIT-TV) stand on the summit.

The east side of Rattlesnake Mountain drains into Trout Brook, then to the Park River, thence into the Connecticut River and Long Island Sound; the west side into the Pequabuck River, then to the Farmington River, thence to the Connecticut River. The south side of the mountain supports the headwaters of the Quinnipiac River, which flows directly into Long Island Sound.

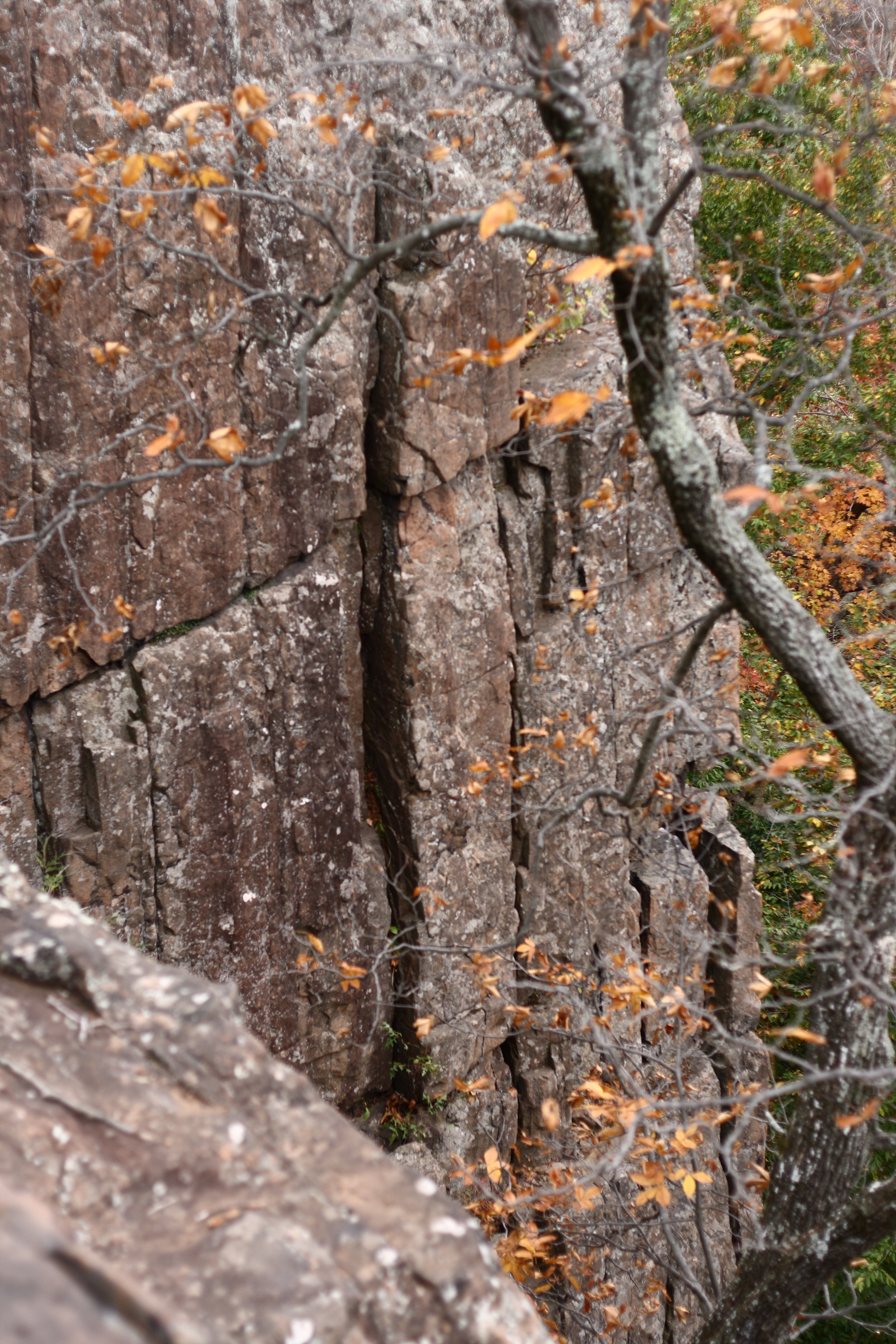
The Rattlesnake Cliffs, traprock cliffs atop Rattlesnake Mountain

== Geology and ecology ==
Rattlesnake Mountain, like much of the Metacomet Ridge, is composed of basalt, also called traprock, a volcanic rock. The mountain formed near the end of the Triassic Period with the rifting apart of the North American continent from Africa and Eurasia. Lava welled up from the rift and solidified into sheets of strata hundreds of feet thick. Subsequent faulting and earthquake activity tilted the strata, creating the cliffs and ridgeline of Rattlesnake Mountain. Hot, dry upper slopes, cool, moist ravines, and mineral-rich ledges of basalt talus produce a combination of microclimate ecosystems on the mountain that support plant and animal species uncommon in greater Connecticut. Rattlesnake Mountain is also an important raptor migration path. (See Metacomet Ridge for more information on the geology and ecosystem of Rattlesnake Mountain).

== Folklore ==
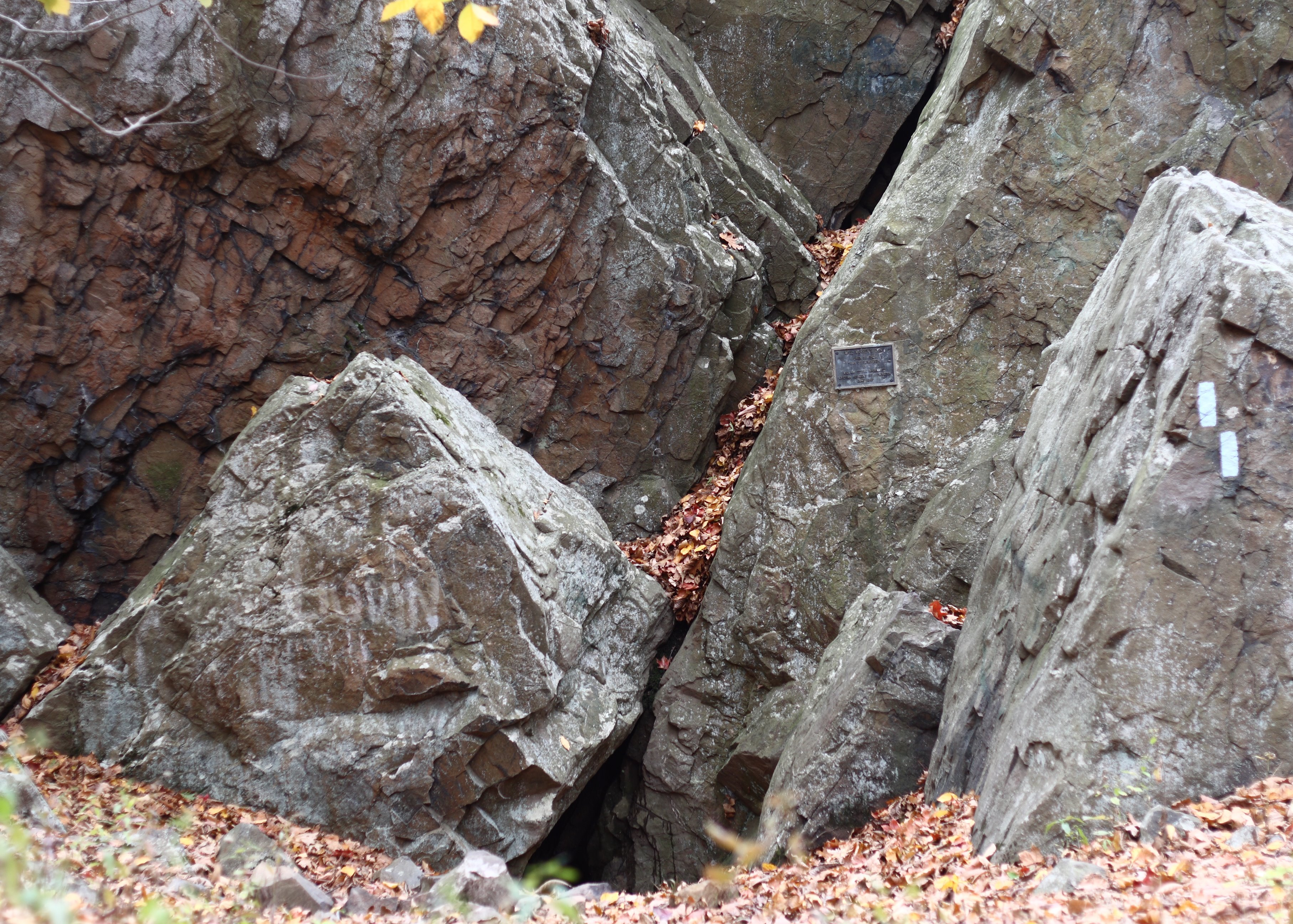
Will Warren's Den

Will Warren's Den, a boulder cave located on the west side of the mountain, is a historic landmark of the town of Farmington. A plaque affixed to the cave reads, "Said Warren, according to legend, after being flogged for not going to church, tried to burn the village of Farmington. He was pursued into the mountains, where some Indian squaws hid him in this cave." The cave is accessible from the Metacomet Trail.

== Recreation and conservation ==
Rattlesnake Mountain is traversed by the Metacomet Trail, (maintained by the Connecticut Forest and Park Association), which extends from the Hanging Hills of Meriden, Connecticut, to the Massachusetts border. Rattlesnake Mountain offers a number of clifftop views west over the Pequabuck River valley toward the eastern escarpment of the Berkshire Mountains. Suburban Farmington is visible below. The mountain is open to hiking, bird watching, picnicking, snowshoeing, and other passive pursuits. A number of rock climbing websites indicate several climbing routes on the mountain.

The ecosystem of Rattlesnake Mountain is most threatened by development and quarrying. In 2000, Rattlesnake Mountain was included in a study by the National Park Service for the designation of a new National Scenic Trail now tentatively called the New England National Scenic Trail, which would include the Metacomet-Monadnock Trail in Massachusetts and the Mattabesett Trail and Metacomet Trail trails in Connecticut.

The Farmington Land Trust is active in the conservation of Rattlesnake Mountain and its viewshed. Will Warren's Den (part of the William S. Wadsworth Memorial property) is among the many easements managed by the trust.

== See also ==
- Metacomet Ridge
- Adjacent summits:

↓ South

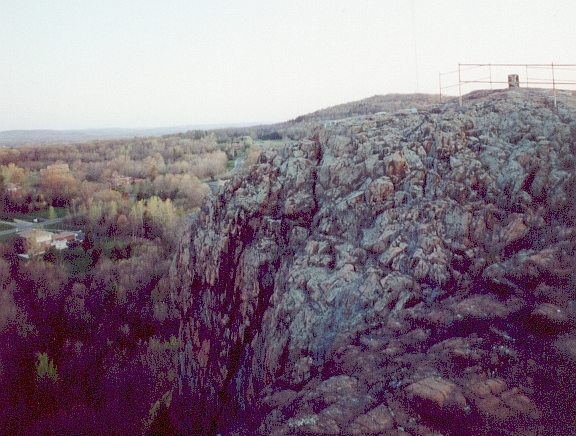
Pinnacle Rock

North ↑

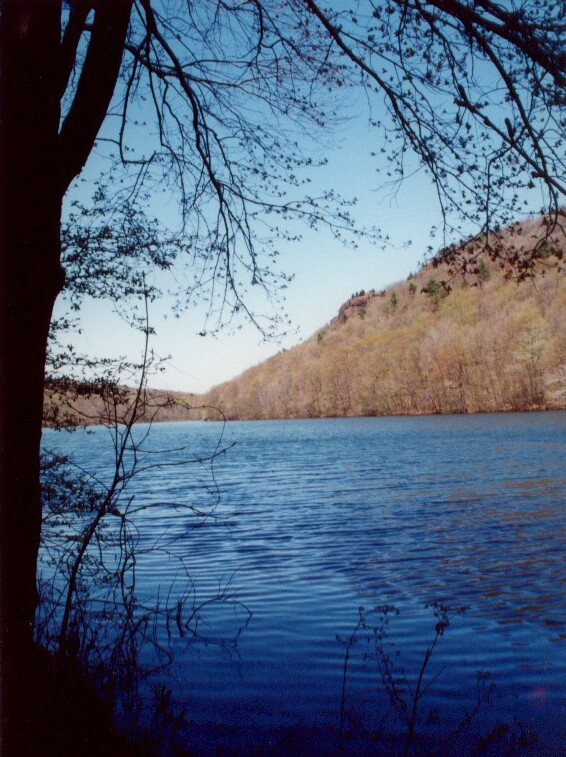
Farmington Mountain
