= Apple Valley Airport =

Apple Valley Airport may refer to:

- Apple Valley Airport (California) a public use airport in Apple Valley, California, United States
- Apple Valley Airport (Oregon) a private use airport in Buxton, Oregon, United States
