= Captain Ron =

1992 film by Thom Eberhardt

- Theatrical release poster
- Directed by: Thom Eberhardt
- Screenplay by: John Dwyer; Thom Eberhardt
- Story by: John Dwyer
- Produced by: David Permut
- Starring: Kurt Russell; Martin Short; Mary Kay Place
- Cinematography: Daryn Okada
- Edited by: Tina Hirsch
- Music by: Nicholas Pike
- Production companies: Touchstone Pictures; Touchwood Pacific Partners I
- Distributed by: Buena Vista Pictures Distribution
- Release date: September 18, 1992
- Running time: 100 minutes
- Country: United States
- Language: English
- Budget: $24 million
- Box office: $22,518,097

Captain Ron is a 1992 American comedy film directed by Thom Eberhardt, produced by David Permut, and co-written by John Dwyer and Thom Eberhardt for Touchstone Pictures. It stars Kurt Russell as the eponymous sailor with a quirky personality and a checkered past, alongside Martin Short and Mary Kay Place who hire him to sail a yacht through the Caribbean. It earned negative reviews and was a box-office disappointment.

== Plot ==
Martin Harvey is a middle-aged office worker who lives in Chicago with his wife, Katherine, 16-year-old daughter, Caroline, and 11-year-old son, Ben. When he learns his recently deceased uncle has bequeathed him a 60-foot yacht once owned by Clark Gable, he decides to take his family to the island of St. Pomme de Terre ("Saint Potato") to retrieve it so he can sell it. Katherine resists the idea, but agrees after Caroline announces she has just become engaged.

When the Harveys arrive at the island, they discover that the yacht, Wanderer, is in terrible condition. Upon hearing this, the yacht broker cancels his plan to send an experienced captain to help them sail it to Miami, and instead hires a local sailor named Captain Ron Rico (Ronrico is a rum brand); a laid-back, one-eyed Navy veteran who claims to have piloted USS Saratoga. He launches immediately after he realises the borrowed car he arrived in rolled off the dock and sank.

Captain Ron takes Ben's money in a game of Monopoly, giving him beer to drink and charging him for it later, but shows loyalty to Martin, whom he refers to as "Boss." Martin, who doesn't like Ron, calls him "Moron" in his diary, and believes he doesn't know what he's doing.

The Harveys decide to stop off in the Caribbean, but learn that Captain Ron doesn't know how to navigate. While on a random island, Martin decides to go on a nature hike, but runs into guerrillas led by General Armando. Captain Ron bargains for Martin's freedom by giving them a lift to the next island, and receiving some firearms in return to fight off pirates. This angers Martin, as he declares there will be no firearms on his yacht and tosses them overboard, before realizing that without them, he is going to have to give the guerrillas a lift.

In the yacht's cabin, Katherine shows Martin the initials of Clark Gable and Carole Lombard marked on the bedpost. They are so excited that they share their feelings and have passionate sex.

When the Harveys arrive at their next destination, San Juan, Martin and Katherine are arrested for smuggling the guerrillas. Caroline and Ben party with the locals and Captain Ron, which ends with Caroline getting a tattoo, Ben breaking his glasses, and Captain Ron losing his glass eye. Martin and Katherine are released from jail, but forced to leave that night. Martin decides to leave Captain Ron behind. They encounter pirates who steal the yacht, and are stuck floating in a raft.

They land in Cuba and discover the yacht there. The pirates find them, but with help from Captain Ron, they are able to escape with the yacht. Captain Ron learns that they underestimate Martin, and he decides to play hurt, forcing Martin to take control of the escape. Using the skills that Captain Ron taught them, they are able to get the sails up after the engine breaks, and distance themselves from the pirates. The United States Coast Guard, responding to a distress call from Captain Ron, arrives and stops the pirates, creating a safe passage to Miami.

The Harveys arrive in Miami and part ways with Captain Ron. As they sail to their destination, they decide to turn the yacht around and keep it. In the final scene, Captain Ron appears to have cleaned up his appearance and has quickly taken on a new role as a captain for a young couple and their small motorboat. Notably he is no longer wearing an eye patch.

== Cast ==
- Kurt Russell as Captain Ron Rico
- Martin Short as Martin Harvey
- Mary Kay Place as Katherine Harvey
- Meadow Sisto as Caroline Harvey
- Benjamin Salisbury as Ben Harvey
- Sunshine Logroño as General Armando (as Emannuel Logrono)
- Jorge Luis Ramos as General Armando's Translator
- J.A. Preston as Magistrate
- Tanya Soler as Angeline
- Raúl Estela as Roscoe
- Jainardo Batista as Mamba
- Dan Butler as Bill Zachery
- Tom McGowan as Bill
- Roselyn Sanchez as Clarisse
- Paul Anka as Donaldson, Yacht Broker
- Shanti Kahn as Patti, Donaldson's Secretary
- Katherine Calzada as Barbara
- John Scott Clough as Garth
- Marty Eli Schwartz as Supervisor
- Craig Rondell as Caroline's Fiancé
- C.M. Talkington (credited as Clement Talkington) as the Bicycle Messenger

== Production ==
John Dwyer based the film's premise off of an experience he had in 1969 when Dwyer's father, an advertising executive, bought a used Chris-Craft Commander at a Boat show in Fort Lauderdale, Florida and convinced his family it would be an "adventure" to sail the boat from Florida back to Texas. The broker convinced the family not to embark on the trip without hiring an experienced sea captain who like the movie was also named Ron. Like the film counterpart, the real Captain Ron not only also wore an eyepatch due to missing an eye but also had a peg leg which was not included in the film as it would've felt too ridiculous to believe. Captain Ron was also frequently drunk most of they voyage leading to the nickname of "Ron Rico" after the brand of rum he would drink.

The film as originally conceived followed an ad-man-seeking-status and was a more adult skewing comedy with Chevy Chase written in mind for the Captain Ron role. However, once Walt Disney Studios acquired the script it was rewritten as a family film and would follow a family inheriting a sailboat and seeking adventure in the Caribbean. Initially, Kurt Russell and Martin Short were cast in each other's roles before choosing to swap. Much of the film was shot in and around Puerto Rico.

The film was retitled twice before release. First it was titled Don't Rock the Boat, then Generational Ron, and then it was retitled On the Wanderer, before it was released as Captain Ron.

Filming on Captain Ron took place from February through May of 1992.

== Release ==
The film was theatrically released on September 18, 1992. A home video release would follow on March 24, 1993.

== Reception ==
=== Box office ===
The film grossed $22.5 million, against its budget of $24 million.

=== Critical response ===
The film premiered on September 18, 1992, to negative reviews from critics. It was panned for putting Russell in the comedic role and Short in the serious one, while others felt that Russell's fun performance as the irresponsible and sometimes unsympathetic yacht captain carried it through its flaws.

It has a score of 29% on Rotten Tomatoes based on 24 reviews with the consensus: "Despite the swashbuckling charms of Kurt Russell's seafaring antics, Captain Ron capsizes in its hackneyed narrative waters." It has since found a niche among sailors, and given the dearth of nautical comedies, the film saw a resurgence of interest in the mid-2010s. In 2016, Tammy Kennon of USA Today referred to the film as a "sailing cult classic" and suggested that the film might contain "the most widely celebrated ketch in pop culture".

Salisbury and Sisto were each nominated for a Young Artist Award.

Noah Segan has cited the character of Captain Ron as an inspiration for his performance as Derol in the film Glass Onion: A Knives Out Mystery.

In 2026, D.J. Jezierski published After Two, a novel written as an independent tribute to Captain Ron. Set three decades after the film, it brings together returning and new characters in Caribbean sailing adventure against a backdrop of mysterious treasure, shadowy enemies and centuries-old secrets.

== See also ==
- What About Bob?
