= Tony Martinez =

Tony Martinez may refer to:

- Tony Martínez (1940–1991), Cuban-born Major League Baseball shortstop
- Tony Martinez (broadcaster), American television and radio broadcaster
- Tony Martinez (actor) (1920–2002), Puerto Rican actor, singer, and bandleader
- Tony Martinez (darts player) (born 1969), Spanish-Belgian darts player
