= National Association of College Broadcasters =

American trade association

The National Association of College Broadcasters (NACB) was founded in 1988 by four undergraduate students at Brown University in Providence, Rhode Island. Jumpstarted by a $300,000 grant from the now-defunct CBS Foundation, thanks to connections through the father of co-founder Doug Liman, NACB became the first trade association specifically geared to all aspects of American student-staffed radio and television stations (other unaffiliated organizations, such as the National Broadcasting Society, Alpha Epsilon Rho, was geared to student journalists, and not all aspects of station operations, while the Intercollegiate Broadcasting System, geared to College radio, did not embrace Student television stations until well after NACB's founding. The National Association of Educational Broadcasters was focused on professionally run stations based on college campuses that were typically National Public Radio member stations).

Thanks in part to keynote addresses by legendary television journalist Walter Cronkite at its first national conference in November, 1988; media magnate Ted Turner the following year; and Quincy Jones at 1990's event, NACB put itself on the map quickly, reaching a peak of over 600 member stations in the U.S. and a few internationally by 1992. Its National College Television and Radio Awards was the second (after the Academy of Television Arts & Sciences' annual student competition) to give significant cash prizes for student productions in a wide range of programming categories that year, thanks to support from several of the U.S.'s major media companies, including CBS, ESPN, CNN, NBC, HBO, Fox, E! Entertainment, MTV Networks and Interep.

== History ==
Over its first few years, NACB hired three full-time staff to manage the association, at times including some graduating Brown students. The association continued to enjoy significant support from student volunteers and office space on campus donated by Brown University.

Among its notable successes were U-Net (later trademarked as U Network), a satellite-delivered programming network featuring top student productions; regional conferences expanding from the national; the comprehensive Station Handbook manual, an annually updated guide for Campus radio and TV station operations; and a monthly print magazine, College Broadcaster, widely read among student managers and college station faculty advisors, published from 1989 through 1996. Unfortunately, the cost of delivering programming by satellite and the relatively few Student television station that could receive such programming at the time limited the reach of the network. In the mid-1990s, Lucie Salhany, head of the upstart television network by United Television and Paramount Pictures, made a modest unsolicited offer to buy the rights to the U Network name. NACB countered with a $100,000 request, which she refused, thus the network was named UPN instead of U.

NACB's board of directors was composed of students and faculty, most of whom turned over annually and whose business savvy was understandably not as mature as the industry professionals it attracted to its conferences. Its advisory board of media luminaries never met physically and was infrequently tapped for assistance. Incorporated as a 501(c) non-profit, its revenue streams were limited to member dues (quite low, to account for limited student organization budgets), conference registrations, database list rentals and a few special projects, so donations continued to be vital to its survival. Due primarily to a lack of seasoned leadership who could build the relationships that insured continued philanthropic support, the organization ceased operations in 1998.

== Legacy ==
Realizing the vacuum left by NACB's demise, two of its member stations' faculty advisors (Michael Black, Warren Kozireski, Will Robedee, and Joel Willer) soon after founded College Broadcasters Inc., also a non-profit geared to college station operations. The organization worked with College Media Advisors programming content for their conventions initially, but started programming its own conventions in 2012. It continues to operate today. Fellow NACB co-founder David Bartis has continued to work closely with Doug Liman in the 20+ years since, forming a production company that has handled many major network television series as well as Doug directing major Hollywood studio feature films.

Notes:

- College Broadcaster (ISSN 1055-0461), Providence, RI
- Internet Archive of full issues of College Broadcaster magazine (1989-1997)
- SPIN magazine profile of NACB in May 1992 issue
- BMI Supports NACB
- History of Emerson College - see 1993 reference to NACB student programming awards
- Hofstra University awards from NACB (in 1990s section)
- Warren Kozireski biography, numerous NACB and College Broadcaster references
- ACRN ranked a top student station by NACB
- 27th Annual and 29th Annual EVVY Awards mention NACB
- KSJS-FM/San Jose references its two Station of the Year awards from NACB in 1989 and 1991 (Wayback Archive from ksjs.org/station_facts.html)
