= KPTV =

Television station in Portland, Oregon

- Portland–Salem, Oregon; Vancouver, Washington; United States
- City: Portland, Oregon
- Channels: Digital: 12 (VHF); Virtual: 12
- Branding: Fox 12 Oregon; Fox 12 News

Programming
- Affiliations: 12.1: Fox; for others, see § Subchannels

Ownership
- Owner: Gray Media; (Gray Television Licensee, LLC)
- Sister stations: KPDX

History
- First air date: September 18, 1952
- Former channel numbers: Analog: 27 (UHF, 1952–1957), 12 (VHF, 1957–2009); Digital: 30 (UHF, 1999–2009)
- Former affiliations: NBC (1952–1959); CBS (secondary, 1952–1953); DuMont (secondary, 1952–1955); ABC (secondary 1952–1955, primary 1959–1964); Independent (1964–1986, 1988–1995); Fox (1986–1988); UPN (1995–2002)
- Call sign meaning: Portland Television

Technical information
- Licensing authority: FCC
- Facility ID: 50633
- ERP: 24.5 kW
- HAAT: 529 m (1,736 ft)
- Transmitter coordinates: 45°31′18″N 122°44′57″W
- Translator(s): see § Translators

Links
- Public license information: Public file; LMS
- Website: www.kptv.com

KPTV (channel 12) is a television station in Portland, Oregon, United States, affiliated with the Fox network. It is owned by Gray Media alongside Vancouver, Washington–licensed KPDX (channel 49), an independent station with MyNetworkTV. The two stations share studios on NW Greenbrier Parkway in Beaverton; KPTV's transmitter is located in the Sylvan-Highlands section of Portland.

== History ==
=== Early years ===
KPTV signed on the air on September 18, 1952, as Oregon's first television station. KPTV originally broadcast on channel 27, making it also the nation's first commercial television station to broadcast on the UHF band. (the first experimental UHF station was Bridgeport, Connecticut's KC2XAK on channel 24). The station was originally owned by Empire Coil. As Portland's only television station at the time, it carried programming from all four networks of the time: ABC, CBS, NBC and the DuMont Television Network. CBS programming was dropped from KPTV's schedule when Portland's first VHF station, KOIN (channel 6), signed on the air on October 15, 1953. KPTV then became a primary NBC affiliate, and also continued to air some ABC and DuMont programming.

KPTV also broadcast programs from the short-lived original Paramount Television Network during the early 1950s; in fact, it was one of that network's strongest affiliates, carrying Paramount programs such as Time For Beany, Hollywood Wrestling, and Bandstand Revue. During the late 1950s, the station was also briefly affiliated with the NTA Film Network. Empire Coil sold KPTV and its other broadcast property, WXEL (now WJW-TV) in Cleveland, to Storer Broadcasting on November 17, 1954. On August 11, 1954, KPTV became the first television station in Portland to broadcast in color, three days before KOIN achieved the same milestone.

The VHF channel 12 allocation in Portland was first occupied by KLOR-TV, which signed on March 9, 1955, as a primary ABC affiliate with a secondary DuMont affiliation. However, KLOR's network affiliations were short-lived. In 1956, KLOR lost its affiliations with both networks as the DuMont Television Network ceased operations, and the ABC affiliation moved to KGW-TV (channel 8) when that station signed on the air in December. On April 17, 1957, Detroit businessman George Haggerty purchased KPTV from Storer and KLOR from its local owners. On May 1, the two stations merged under KPTV's license, but using the stronger channel 12 signal (channel 27 was later used by independent station KHTV, which was on the air for less than four months in 1959; more recently, the channel 27 frequency was used by the digital signal of PBS member station KOPB-TV, which returned to its original channel 10 assignment following the analog shutdown; the KHTV call letters were later used to sign on channel 39 in Houston in 1967, that station used the callsign from its launch until 1999; it is now KIAH).

On April 17, 1959, KPTV became an ABC affiliate after swapping its NBC affiliation with KGW. Later that year, KPTV was sold to the NAFI Corporation, which then purchased Chris-Craft Boats in 1960 and changed its name to Chris-Craft Industries. Color broadcasting by KPTV ended when KGW became an NBC affiliate in 1959, but returned in 1962, when ABC began color broadcasting.

KPTV was the home of the two top children's TV hosts in Portland's history: Rusty Nails, a quiet-natured clown who was the rough inspiration for The Simpsons creator Matt Groening's Krusty the Klown; and "Ramblin' Rod" Anders. While Rusty Nails originally ran Three Stooges shorts, Ramblin' Rod featured Popeye cartoons. Ramblin' Rod was the longest-running kids' show in Portland TV history, broadcast from 1964 to 1997. Other KPTV children's hosts included longtime KPTV personality Gene Brendler who played "Bent Nails" (Rusty's "brother"), and George Ross, who played "Dr. Zoom". Bob Adkins, better known as "Addie Bobkins", brought his show to KPTV from Eugene's KVAL-TV in 1961. "Addie Bobkins" featured a wise-cracking beatnik hand puppet named "Weird Beard". Both Ross and Adkins ran a variety of cartoons to entertain the kids.

=== First stint as an independent station ===
On March 1, 1964, KPTV lost its ABC affiliation to independent station KATU (channel 2), which had debuted in March 1962. KPTV sued ABC and KATU's then-owner Fisher Broadcasting for breach of contract; the proceeds from the settlement went to rebuild KPTV into a color-capable station, and to purchase a color mobile unit. KPTV soon became known as one of the top independent stations in the western United States. By the late 1960s, it was a regional superstation carried on every cable system in Oregon, as well as a number of cable systems in parts of Washington and Idaho.

In 1967, Portland Wrestling returned to KPTV after a 12-year absence. Frank Bonnema, news reporter and afternoon movie host, served as the voice of Portland Wrestling until shortly before his death on October 5, 1982. KPTV had originated telecasts of professional wrestling in 1953, with commentator Bob Abernathy, but lost the franchise to rival KOIN two years later. KPTV regained the franchise in 1967, and aired the wrestling matches until December 1991. Later wrestling commentators were KISN radio DJ Don Coss and former wrestlers Dutch Savage and Stan Stasiak. Portland Wrestling's chief promoters were Don Owen, and later, former wrestler-referee Sandy Barr. Primary long-time sponsors for the show were Chevrolet dealers Ron Tonkin of Portland and Friendly of Lake Oswego, and the celebrated ever-smiling furniture and appliance dealer Tom Peterson. Peterson was also the top sponsor for most of KPTV's movies.

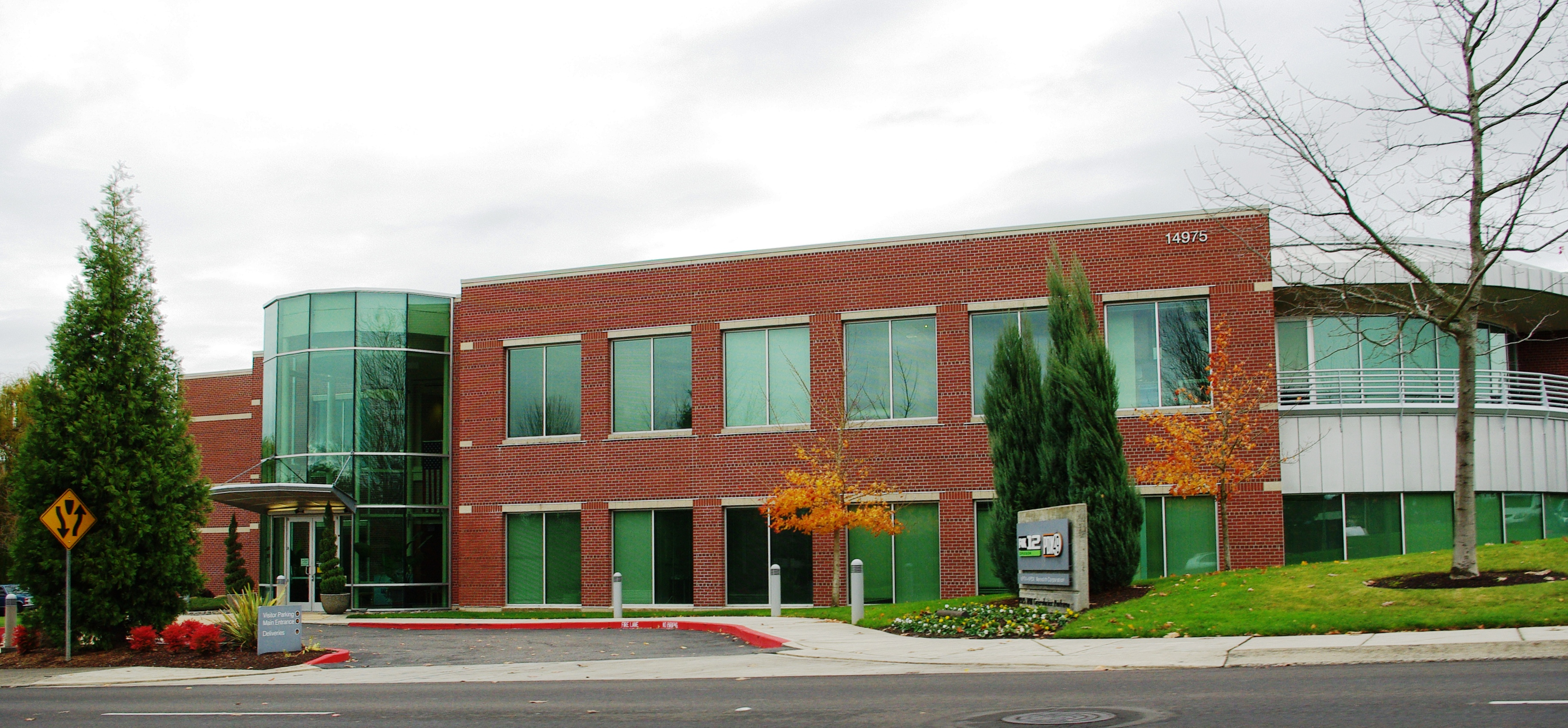
KPTV and KPDX studios and offices near Sunset Highway.

In 1970, KPTV became the first television station in the market to broadcast Portland Trail Blazers basketball games, with sports director Jimmy Jones serving as the team's first play-by-play television announcer; KPTV maintained the broadcast rights to Blazers games until the end of the 1977–78 season. In 1977, Chris-Craft placed its self-named television subsidiary underneath a holding company called BHC, Inc.

KPTV carried Operation Prime Time programming at least in 1978.

=== First Fox affiliation, then back to independence ===
On October 9, 1986, channel 12 became one of the original charter affiliates of the newly launched Fox network; it would, however, continue to function as an independent station, since Fox wouldn't start a full weeks' worth of programming until 1993; it was one of the few non-network-owned stations to affiliate with Fox upon its debut. KPTV did not remain a Fox affiliate for very long. By 1988, KPTV was one of several Fox affiliates nationwide (along with its Minneapolis–Saint Paul sister station, KMSP-TV) that were underwhelmed by the network's programming and low ratings in its first two seasons. KPTV subsequently dropped its affiliation with Fox on August 29, 1988, and reverted to being an independent station. Fox affiliation shifted to KPDX (channel 49), which first signed on the air in 1983. In 1993, KPTV, along with Chris-Craft's other independent stations, began carrying programming from the Prime Time Entertainment Network, a programming service owned by Chris-Craft in conjunction with Warner Bros. Entertainment.

=== UPN affiliation ===
By the early 1990s, Fox gradually rose in popularity as it began to carry stronger programming than had initially been broadcast during KPTV's first affiliation with the network, with many shows that were starting to rival the program offerings of the "Big Three" networks. In late 1994, Chris-Craft/United Television partnered with Paramount Pictures/Viacom to form the United Paramount Network (UPN) and both companies made independent stations that they respectively owned in several large and mid-sized U.S. cities charter stations of the new network. UPN was launched on January 16, 1995, with KPTV becoming a UPN owned-and-operated station—the first such O&O station in the Portland market—as a result of Chris-Craft/United's ownership stake in the network. KPTV would eventually be stripped of its UPN O&O status in 2000, after Viacom exercised a contractual clause to buy out Chris-Craft's ownership of the network, although the station retained its UPN affiliation until 2002.

=== Return to Fox ===
On August 12, 2000, Chris-Craft sold its UPN stations (spinning off two other stations that were not affiliated with that network in the process) to the Fox Television Stations subsidiary of News Corporation for $5.5 billion; the deal was finalized on July 31, 2001. However, instead of keeping the station, Fox traded KPTV to the Meredith Corporation, owner of KPDX, in exchange for WOFL in Orlando and its Gainesville semi-satellite WOGX in a deal which was finalized on June 17, 2002. The KPTV purchase gave Meredith the first television station duopoly in the Portland market.

Meredith then decided to swap the market's Fox and UPN affiliations; on September 2, 2002, Fox programming moved to the higher-rated KPTV—returning the network to channel 12 after a 14-year absence—while KPDX joined UPN. As part of the switch, KPTV's longtime moniker of "Oregon's 12" was changed to "Fox 12 Oregon". Although KPTV is the senior partner in the duopoly, the merged operation was based at KPDX's newer and larger facility in suburban Beaverton rather than KPTV's longtime home in East Portland. KPTV also absorbed KPDX's news department, resulting in the cancellation of KPDX's 10 p.m. newscast (KPDX now airs a weeknight 8 p.m. newscast that is produced by KPTV). The Fox affiliation switch coincided with a realignment of the National Football League that brought the market's most popular NFL team, the Seattle Seahawks, into the NFC West division. As a result, KPTV became an unofficial secondary station for the Seahawks, airing most of that team's games through the Fox network's rights to air games from the NFL's National Football Conference.

On October 27, 2012, KPTV revived Portland Wrestling after a 21-year absence from the station and renamed the program Portland Wrestling Uncut. The program had returned with the help of Rowdy Roddy Piper; Don Coss was back to announce the matches along with special guests. The wrestling matches were taped at KPTV's studios in Beaverton. Two months later on December 29, Portland Wrestling Uncut moved to KPTV's sister station KPDX, retaining the Saturday night timeslot that the program held when it was revived on KPTV. The show was canceled in mid-2014.

=== Sale to Gray Television ===
On May 3, 2021, Gray Television announced its intent to purchase the Meredith Local Media division for $2.7 billion. The sale was completed on December 1. As a result, KPTV and KPDX became Gray's first stations on the West Coast of the contiguous United States.

== Programming ==
KPTV clears most of Fox's programming schedule (nightly prime time, Saturday late night, and Fox Sports programming, along with the political talk show Fox News Sunday)—however it preempts the network's Saturday morning educational programming block, Xploration Station, which instead airs on KPDX. Much like the stations that were affected by the Fox/New World affiliation switches of 1994, KPTV chose not to air Fox's children's programming (4Kids TV; formerly Fox Kids) after the 2002 affiliation switch to Fox; instead airing children's programs acquired via syndication on weekend mornings (it was derived from a concept by New World Communications when it converted many of the network's affiliates to Fox), the lineup remained on KPDX until 4Kids TV was discontinued by Fox (due to a dispute between the network and the block's lessee 4Kids Entertainment) in December 2008.

=== The tradition of Perry Mason at noon ===
In 1966, KPTV began broadcasting syndicated reruns of Perry Mason on weekday evenings. In 1970, KPTV moved Perry Mason to a new time, weekdays at noon (replacing the long-running children's show, Rusty Nails). It was the start of a longtime Portland television tradition, as Perry Mason would continue to be broadcast in the 12 p.m. timeslot each weekday until 2012 (save for a 10-month period from 1974 to 1975, when it moved to 12:30 p.m.). By the late 2000s, KPTV audience research indicated that one out of eleven people in the entire Portland market who were watching television at 12 p.m. weekdays, were tuned in to Perry Mason on channel 12. The Perry Mason at noon tradition was so solid that when Meredith Corporation named Patrick McCreery as the new general manager of KPTV in August 2008, McCreery was granted the power to make any local programming changes he saw fit with one exception: he could not drop Perry Mason from the schedule nor move it from the 12 p.m. timeslot.

The tradition finally ended in August 2012 when KPTV moved Perry Mason to sister station KPDX channel 49, on September 4, 2012, in an earlier 8 a.m. timeslot (Rachael Ray replaced Mason in the noon timeslot on KPTV); the program's relocation from the noon slot—and displacement from KPTV—was cited as the result of decreased viewership of Perry Mason in recent years on channel 12 and programming shifts in daytime television towards more first-run syndicated talk and court programs. Because KPTV and KPDX held the broadcast rights to Perry Mason in the Portland market, KATU channel 2 did not broadcast the program on its MeTV subchannel (MeTV held broadcast rights to the program nationally), replacing it with other programs carried by that network.

By September 2014, Perry Mason had left KPDX and was replaced with variable programming, ending a 48-year long Portland tradition. Accordingly, the MeTV subchannel on KATU began showing Perry Mason in pattern with the national schedule until the station replaced the network with Charge! in September 2022. MeTV in Portland is now on the third subchannel of KJYY-LD, a translator of Salem-licensed Telemundo affiliate KJWY-LD.

Originally, KPTV replaced the reruns with syndicated programming, but has since added an hour-long newscast at 12:00 p.m. under The Noon News.

=== News operation ===
KPTV presently broadcasts 67 hours of locally produced newscasts each week (with 11 1/2 hours each weekday, five hours on Saturdays and 4 1/2 hours on Sundays); in regards to the number of hours devoted to news programming, it is the highest local newscast output of any television station in the state of Oregon. The station produced a half-hour sports wrap-up show called Oregon Sports Final that aired on Sundays at 11 p.m. (the program ended on September 10, 2017, and was replaced by the Sunday edition of the 11 p.m. newscast on September 17). KPTV is also one of the few Fox affiliates that produces newscasts for another television station in the same market, as it produces ten hours of local newscasts each week for sister station KPDX (consisting of two hour-long prime time newscasts at 8 and 9 p.m.).

Throughout its entire history, as a network affiliate and as an independent station, KPTV has always operated a local news department. Future Oregon governor Tom McCall, a longtime journalist before entering politics, joined KPTV in 1955 as a newscaster and political commentator. McCall left KPTV in late 1956 for KGW-TV, where he was a member of the original news team for seven years before leaving to run for Oregon's secretary of state. The station's long-running prime time newscast, known as The 10 O'Clock News, debuted in 1970. KPTV was also one of the first television stations in the country to run a mid-afternoon newscast, as the station aired a 3 p.m. news bulletin (known as Coffee Break News) from 1974 to 1978. Since then (especially after switching to Fox), KPTV has begun to go head-to-head with competitors KGW, KATU and KOIN by taking on a more news-intensive format, which took years to take effect.

The station launched its morning news program, Good Day Oregon, in 1996 as a three-hour weekday broadcast. The program has since been extended, and currently runs from 4:30 to 9 a.m.; KPTV was one of a growing number stations in the country with a morning newscast beginning before 5 a.m. until April 19, 2010, when the 4:30–5 a.m. portion of Good Day Oregon was cut, the 4:30 half-hour of the program was restored in 2012. KPTV is also one of the few local stations and one of a handful of Fox stations to offer a three-hour newscast on Saturday and Sunday mornings.

On June 5, 2007, KPTV became the second Portland television station to begin broadcasting its local newscasts in 16:9 widescreen standard definition. One year later on March 4, 2008, the station expanded its newscast schedule to include a weekday 4 p.m. newscast (which was canceled in 2011 but brought back in September 2019), as well as a weekday 8 p.m. newscast on KPDX, with MyNetworkTV programming on KPDX being shifted one hour to 9 to 11 p.m. as a result. The station expanded its 5 p.m. newscast (which had been airing only on Sundays, except when Fox sports programming was scheduled to preempt it) to seven nights a week, now airing on weeknights after its existing 4 p.m. program on September 8, 2008 (the program was eventually reduced to weekdays only by 2012). On April 19, 2010, KPTV began producing a fifth hour of Good Day Oregon for KPDX called More Good Day Oregon, running from 9–10 a.m.; the show features various entertainment and lifestyles topics from a seasoned panel of experts; this extension of the program was canceled in 2012. In 2011, KPTV began broadcasting an hour-long newscast at 6 p.m. on weeknights. On August 26, 2013, KPTV became the last television station in the Portland market to begin broadcasting its newscasts in high-definition.

In March 2014, KEVU in Eugene started airing some of KPTV's broadcasts. It aired the 8 a.m. hour of Good Day Oregon tape-delayed at 9 a.m. on weekdays and the 7:30 half-hour live on weekends, the first half-hour of The 5 O'Clock News, tape-delayed at 5:30 p.m. on weekdays and the first half-hour of The 10 O'Clock News, tape-delayed at 11 p.m. every night. These broadcasts have since been dropped.

==== Notable current on-air staff ====
- Tony Martinez – traffic reporter

==== Notable former on-air staff ====
- Ramblin' Rod Anders – host of the children's show The Ramblin' Rod Show for 35 years
- Lars Larson – news anchor & reporter (1985–1998) and Northwest Reports host/producer; now a nationally syndicated radio talk show host
- Lori Matsukawa
- Tom McCall – political commentator (and former Oregon governor)

== Technical information ==
=== Subchannels ===
The station's signal is multiplexed:

Subchannels of KPTV
Subchannel	Res.	Short name	Programming
12.1	720p	FOX 12	Fox
12.2	480i	COZI	Cozi TV
12.3	480i	DEFY	Defy
12.4	480i	OXYGEN	Oxygen
49.1	720p	Fox12+	KPDX (Independent with MyNetworkTV)
49.3	480i	Outlaw	Outlaw (KPDX)

Broadcast on behalf of another station

=== Analog-to-digital conversion ===
KPTV shut down its analog signal, over VHF channel 12, on June 12, 2009, the official date on which full-power television stations in the United States transitioned from analog to digital broadcasts under federal mandate. The station's digital signal relocated from its pre-transition UHF channel 30 to VHF channel 12.

When KPTV vacated its digital signal from UHF channel 30, sister station KPDX immediately switched its signal to that transmitter. Viewers watching KPTV's digital signal saw a cut from the opening of that day's episode of The 700 Club to the cold open of an episode of Law & Order: Criminal Intent (KPDX turned off its analog transmitter at 9:30 a.m.).

=== Translators ===
- K22LY-D Baker Valley
- K10RV-D Centerville, WA
- K17OY-D Centerville, WA
- K26NQ-D Hood River
- K25OJ-D La Grande
- K33FS-D La Grande
- K09AAK-D Madras
- K28OV-D Madras
- K34NS-D Milton-Freewater
- K35FO-D Milton-Freewater
- K16LN-D Pendleton
- K17GV-D Rainier
- K20HT-D Rockaway Beach
- K29LW-D Rockaway Beach
- K21DE-D Seaside–Astoria
- K29NO-D The Dalles

== See also ==
- Prime Time Entertainment Network – Chris-Craft's stations carried PTEN programing 1993–1995
