= The Pop Shoppe =

Soft drink retailer originating in London, Ontario, Canada

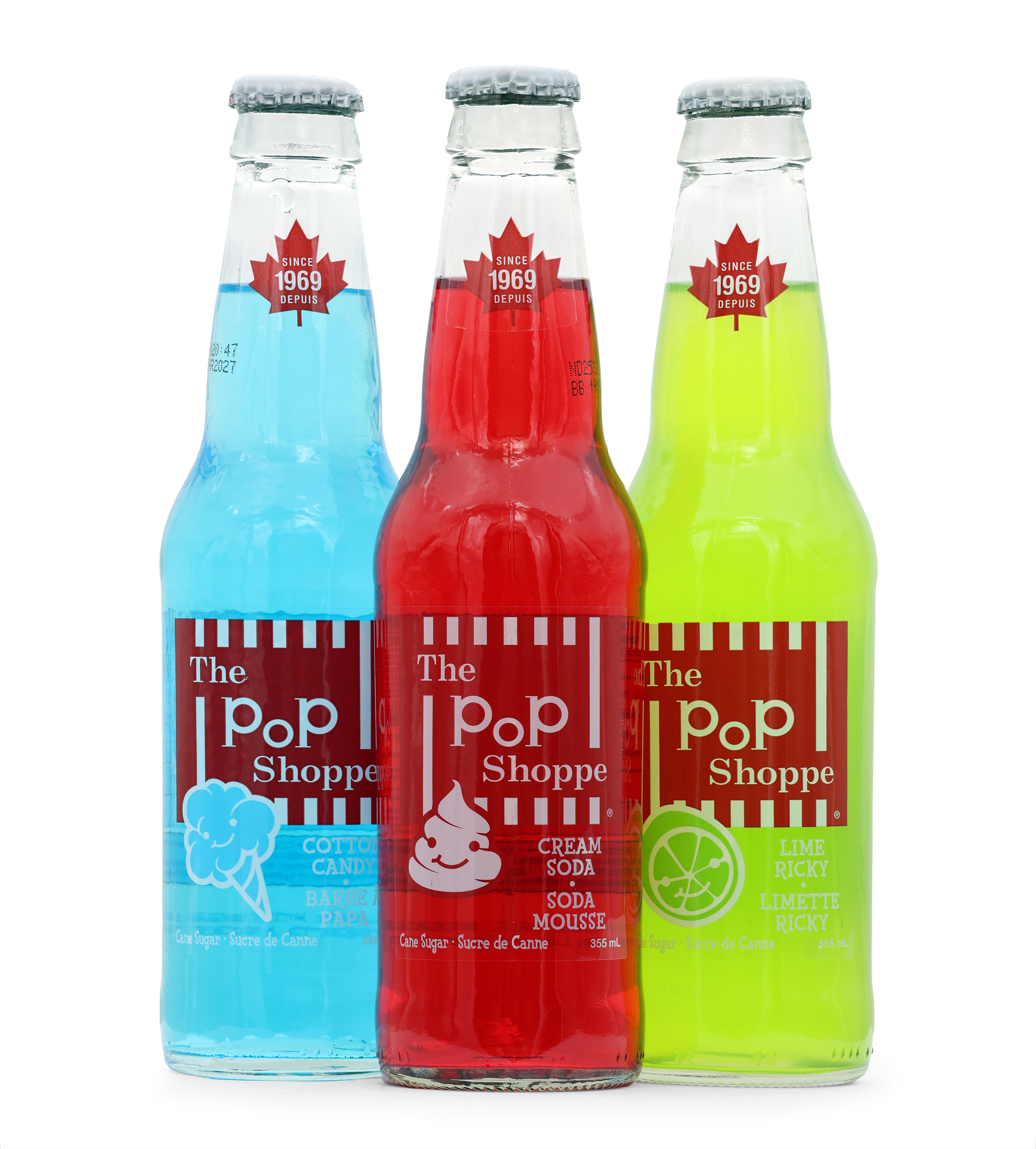
Three flavours of Pop Shoppe soft drinks: cotton candy, cream soda, and lime ricky

The PoP Shoppe is a soft drink retailer originating in 1969 at London, Ontario, by Gary Shaw in Canada. The PoP Shoppe avoided using traditional retail channels, selling its products through franchised outlets and its own stores in refillable bottles in 24-cartons.

== Original ==
Within three years, the company grew within the province to over 500 stores, and entered the United States in the following three years. Eventually, PoP Shoppe was selling throughout Canada and 12 American states. National Hockey League veteran Eddie Shack was the predominant spokesman for the brand. At its height, Pop Shoppe spawned a number of regional imitators, such as Saskatchewan's Pop House, Manitoba's Pick-A-Pop and Edmonton's Happy Pop.

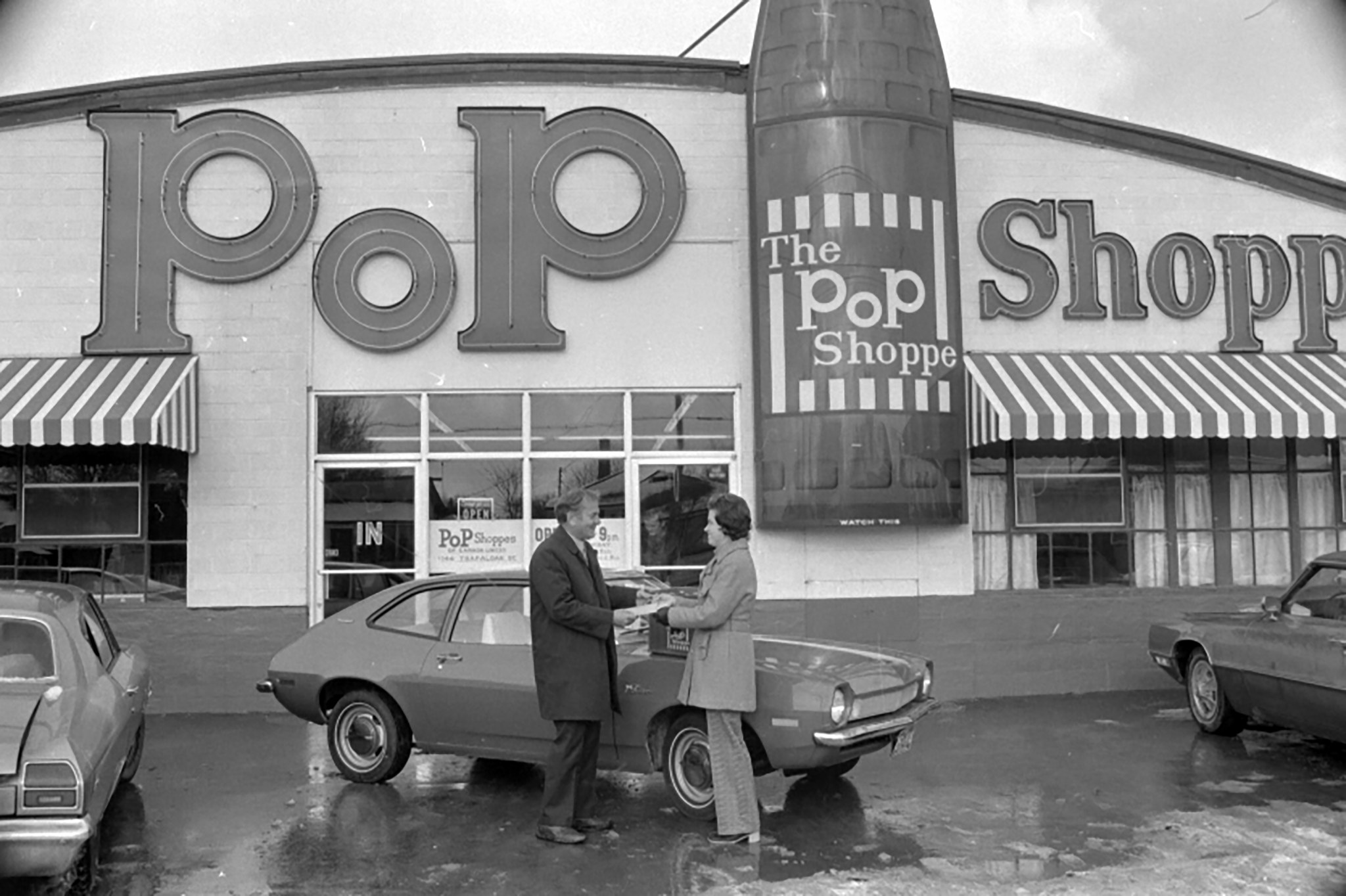
Brick & Mortar Store Circa 1969

The PoP Shoppe Pop enjoyed a regional popularity with residents of Portland, Oregon and surrounding environs as it was featured as the grand prize for winners of the "Smile Contest" and birthday celebrants on KPTV's "The Ramblin' Rod Show",

Circa 1977, there were 26 original flavours distributed from the Indianapolis bottling plant: cola, cream soda, fruit punch, grape, ginger ale, grapefruit, lemon, lemon-lime, lime rickey, orange, pineapple, root beer, strawberry, tonic water, soda water, black cherry, cherry cola, diet black cherry, diet cherry cola, diet cola, diet ginger ale, diet grapefruit, diet lemon, diet orange, diet root beer and diet strawberry.

In the early 1980s, sales slowed, largely blamed on competition from private label grocery store soft drink brands. The original company ceased operations in 1983 and its trademarks expired in 1993. A few small soft drink bottlers in the U.S. have at times sold pop using some of the millions of bottles and cases left abandoned by the closure; those were not related or authorized brands.

== Re-establishment ==
Burlington businessman Brian Alger re-established The PoP Shoppe brand in 2004 after buying the rights to the brand in 2002. Today The Pop Shoppe is sold through distributors, wholesalers, big box clubs and distribution centres rather than company-owned outlets.

The glass bottles are of a new design and are no longer refillable. They are, however, refundable in provinces that operate province-run recycle centres. The PoP Shoppe uses reclaimed glass in the making of new bottles.

In 2008, The Pop Shoppe brought back the classic stubby-style bottle that was popular in Canada during the 1970s. The stubby positioned on retail shelves next to its long-neck competitor bottles gave the appearance that consumers were getting less, and sales plummeted. In 2011, the stubby was discontinued and brought in line with the rest of the industry's long-neck craft soda bottle.

In 2016, The PoP Shoppe was acquired by Beverage World Inc.

In 2020, The Pop Shoppe discontinued sales of its Cola flavour citing low sales.
