= Prime Time Entertainment Network =

American television network (1993–1997)

- Type: Defunct broadcast television network
- Country: United States

Programming
- Picture format: 480i (NTSC)

Ownership
- Owner: Warner Bros. Domestic Television Distribution (Time Warner); BHC Communications (Chris-Craft Industries)
- Parent: Prime Time Consortium

History
- Launched: January 20, 1993; 33 years ago
- Closed: October 27, 1997; 28 years ago (4 years, 280 days)
- Replaced by: The WB; UPN

The Prime Time Entertainment Network (PTEN) was an American television network that was operated by the Prime Time Consortium, a joint venture between the Warner Bros. Domestic Television Distribution subsidiary of Time Warner and the BHC Communications subsidiary of Chris-Craft Industries. Launched on January 20, 1993, and operating until 1997, the network mainly aired drama programs aimed at adults between the ages of 18 and 54. At its peak, PTEN's programming was carried on 177 television stations, covering 93% of the country. Taking on a pay-TV network-type appearance, with its scheduling strategy, the network and premium-TV-like nature of this network followed the Cinemax model. At the time, Cinemax was the top-rated pay TV network, having had a reputation for securing high-profile films and shows (being the exclusive premiere network of GoodFellas in 1991, and having the final season of SCTV in 1983–84). This is significant as UPN would be the primary network of the stations that carried this network, such as WWOR and KCOP.

== History ==
=== Origins ===
At the time of PTEN's founding, co-owner Chris-Craft Industries owned independent television stations in several large and mid-sized U.S. cities (among them its two largest stations, WWOR-TV in New York City and KCOP-TV in Los Angeles) through its BHC Communications division, which formed the nuclei of the network.

PTEN was launched in 1993 as a potential fifth television network, as well as a fifth "major" network (the second since the demise of Star Television Network, launched in 1990, but shut down the year after, in 1991; and very much like its successors in The WB and UPN, despite reaching national coverage, PTEN would never secure "major" status), and was created in reaction to the launch of the Fox network (which debuted in October 1986, seven years before PTEN launched) as well as the successes of first-run syndicated programming during the late 1980s and early 1990s. It offered packaged nights of programming to participating television stations, beginning with a two-hour block on Wednesday evenings, with a second block (originally airing on Saturday, before moving to Monday for the 1994-95 season) being added in September 1993. Originally, the station groups involved in the Prime Time Consortium helped finance PTEN's programs; however, that deal was restructured at the beginning of the network's second year.

The service sought affiliations with various television stations not affiliated with the Big Three television networks. However, close to half of PTEN's initial affiliates were stations that were already affiliated with Fox; as a result, these stations usually scheduled PTEN programming around Fox's then five-night prime time schedule (although Fox would expand its schedule to seven nights with the addition of programming on Tuesdays and Wednesdays on January 19, 1993, the day before PTEN launched). PTEN launched on January 20, 1993, with two series: the science fiction series Time Trax and the action drama Kung Fu: The Legend Continues.

=== Demise ===
PTEN faced two obstacles created by its parent companies which would affect the network. On November 2, 1993, the Warner Bros. Entertainment division of Time Warner announced that it would form its own fifth network, The WB, as a joint venture with the Tribune Company, Six days earlier, on October 27, Chris-Craft Industries announced the launch of the United Paramount Network (UPN), in a programming partnership with the Paramount Television division of Viacom (which would become part-owner of the network in 1996). As a result, the core Chris-Craft independent stations (as well as those owned by Paramount) would serve as flagship stations of the new network; Chris-Craft also chose to pull out of the partnership to focus on operating UPN.

The network also faced issues from some PTEN-affiliated stations that took issue with the network's barter split, which gave nine minutes of advertising time per hour to the syndicator, leaving only five minutes for the stations to sell and program locally. PTEN also ran into difficulty when the studio was forced to let stations out of their back-end commitments for several series. PTEN adopted a variable schedule for the 1995-1996 season, for affiliates to schedule around The WB and UPN's programming on the night of their choosing. With Chris-Craft pulling out of the venture, PTEN essentially became a syndication service for its remaining shows, before ceasing operations altogether in 1997. One of the two series that aired during the service's final year of operation, the science fiction drama Babylon 5, would later be revived by TNT, where it aired for a fifth and final season beginning in 1998.

== Programming ==
=== Former programming ===
==== Series ====
- Babylon 5 (February 22, 1993, as a television film; January 26, 1994 – October 27, 1997, as a weekly series)
- Kung Fu: The Legend Continues (January 27, 1993 – January 1, 1997)
- Pointman (January 24, 1994, as a television film; January 26 – November 27, 1995, as a series)
- Time Trax (January 20, 1993 – December 3, 1994)

==== Films and mini-series ====
- The History of Rock 'n' Roll (March 6, 1995) 10 hour documentary
- Island City (March 2, 1994)
- The Wild West (March 22–26, 1993)
