= Herbert J. Siegel =

American businessman (1928–2023)

- Born: May 7, 1928; Philadelphia, Pennsylvania, U.S.
- Died: August 5, 2023 (aged 95); New York City, New York, U.S.
- Education: Lehigh University
- Occupations: Media proprietor, entrepreneur
- Spouse(s): Ann Levy (1950–2005); Jeanne Sorenson (m. 2007)
- Children: 2

Herbert J. Siegel (May 7, 1928 – August 5, 2023) was an American businessman and investor who served as chairman of Chris-Craft Industries. He was known for his significant role in media industry deals, including enabling the Time Warner merger in 1989 and selling television stations to News Corporation in 2000.

== Early life ==
Herbert Jay Siegel was born on May 7, 1928, in Philadelphia, to Jacob Siegel, a Romanian Jewish immigrant who worked as an overcoat manufacturer, and Frieda (née Stern) Siegel, a musician and homemaker. He graduated from Blair Academy in Blairstown, New Jersey, and earned a bachelor's degree in journalism from Lehigh University in 1950.

== Career ==
While still in college, Siegel attempted to purchase a 20% stake in the Philadelphia Eagles for $60,000 using trust fund money from his father. After this unsuccessful bid, he invested in a television program packaging company partially owned by his father-in-law, Isaac D. Levy, a co-founder of CBS.

=== Early business ventures ===
Using $100,000 from a trust fund provided by his father, Siegel began investing in various businesses. He invested in Official Films, a television show packager, and acquired multiple manufacturing companies, including his father's topcoat business, a Pittsburgh brewery, a car-wax manufacturer, and a jukebox maker. These early ventures netted him a $2 million profit.

In 1961, Siegel created a small conglomerate called Baldwin-Montrose through a three-way merger involving the Old Crown Brewing Corporation based in Fort Wayne, Indiana, Montrose Chemical Co., and Baldwin Rubber Co. In 1962, he purchased General Artists Corporation, a talent agency representing entertainers including Pat Boone, Perry Como, and Jackie Gleason.

=== Paramount Pictures investment ===
In 1965, Siegel partnered with Broadway producer Ernest H. Martin to acquire a 9% stake in Paramount Pictures. They gained board seats but faced conflicts with other directors. Paramount filed an antitrust lawsuit against Baldwin-Montrose, citing a conflict of interest due to its ownership of General Artists Corp. Siegel sold the talent agency and later sold his Paramount stake to Gulf and Western Industries, making a profit of $2.6 million.

=== Chris-Craft Industries ===
In 1968, Siegel acquired control of Chris-Craft Industries, where he served as chairman. At age 28, he became the youngest chairman of a company on the American Stock Exchange. He transformed the company from a boat manufacturer into a media company, selling off its boat-making division in 1981.

In 1969, Chris-Craft began an eight-year legal battle in an attempt to take over Piper Aircraft Corporation. Although a federal appellate court initially awarded Chris-Craft $35.8 million, the U.S. Supreme Court ultimately ruled against them. Siegel sold his stake in Piper for a nominal profit.

=== Media investments ===
In 1978, Siegel began acquiring shares in 20th Century Fox, eventually becoming the studio's largest shareholder with a 20% stake by 1980. He sold his position to Denver oilman Marvin Davis, making a profit of almost $50 million.

In the mid-1980s, Siegel played a crucial role at Warner Communications as a "white knight," helping the company resist a takeover attempt by Rupert Murdoch's News Corporation. He arranged for Chris-Craft to sell 42.5% of its BHC television station unit in exchange for 19% of Warner's voting shares. This arrangement created barriers for Murdoch, who was then an Australian citizen, due to federal laws limiting foreign investment in U.S. broadcast licenses.

=== Time Warner merger and later deals ===
Siegel's relationship with Warner Communications chairman Steve Ross became strained due to disagreements over corporate spending. Despite this, Chris-Craft's stake in Warner proved valuable when the company merged with Time Inc. in 1989, with the deal generating about $1 billion for Chris-Craft.

In the 1990s, Siegel focused on building the value of his television stations. Chris-Craft partnered with Viacom in 1995 to create the United Paramount Network (UPN). Although UPN lost more than $800 million by 2000, Chris-Craft sold its stake to Viacom.

In 2000, Siegel completed his final major deal, selling Chris-Craft's 10 television stations to Murdoch's News Corporation for $5.3 billion. The sale included valuable TV outlets in New York City, Los Angeles, and San Francisco.

== Business style ==
Siegel was known more as an asset manager than a hands-on business operator. He conducted business by monitoring stock prices on his Quotron monitor while his lawyers handled hostile takeovers. The humorist Art Buchwald notably remarked that Siegel deserved an Academy Award for earning the most money in Hollywood without ever making a movie.

== Personal life ==
Siegel married Ann Levy in 1950. After her death in 2005, he married Jeanne Sorenson in 2007. Frank Sinatra performed at his first wedding, while Tony Bennett sang at his second. He had two sons from his first marriage, John and William, who later became executives at Chris-Craft and its divisions.

He was active in Jewish philanthropy, supporting the UJA-Federation of New York.

Siegel died on August 5, 2023, at his home in Manhattan from heart failure at the age of 95.
