= KCOP-TV =

Television station in Los Angeles

ATSC 3.0 station
- Los Angeles, California; United States
- Channels: Digital: 13 (VHF); Virtual: 13
- Branding: Fox Los Angeles Plus

Programming
- Affiliations: 13.1: Independent with MyNetworkTV; for others, see § Subchannels

Ownership
- Owner: Fox Television Stations, LLC
- Sister stations: KTTV

History
- First air date: September 17, 1948
- Former call signs: KLAC-TV (1948–1954)
- Former channel numbers: Analog: 13 (VHF, 1948–2009); Digital: 66 (UHF, 1998–2009)
- Former affiliations: Independent (1948–1995); DuMont (secondary, 1950–1955); UPN (1995–2006)
- Call sign meaning: Copley Press (former owners)

Technical information
- Licensing authority: FCC
- Facility ID: 33742
- ERP: 120 kW
- HAAT: 905 m (2,969 ft)
- Transmitter coordinates: 34°13′29″N 118°3′51″W
- Translator(s): see § Translators

Links
- Public license information: Public file; LMS
- Website: www.foxla.com/fox-11-plus

KCOP-TV (channel 13), branded as Fox Los Angeles Plus, is a television station in Los Angeles, California, United States, owned by the Fox Television Stations group. It is programmed primarily as an independent station, with MyNetworkTV airing in late night (as the service's West Coast flagship). Under common ownership with Fox outlet KTTV (channel 11), the two stations share studios at the Fox Television Center on South Bundy Drive in West Los Angeles; KCOP-TV's transmitter is located atop Mount Wilson.

== History ==
=== Early history ===
Channel 13 first signed on the air on September 17, 1948, as KLAC-TV (standing for Los Angeles, California), and adopted the moniker "Lucky 13". It was originally co-owned with local radio station KLAC (570 AM). Operating as an independent station early on, it began running some programming from the DuMont Television Network in 1949 after KTLA (channel 5) ended its affiliation with the network after a one-year tenure. One of KLAC-TV's earlier stars was veteran actress Betty White, who starred in Al Jarvis's Make-Believe Ballroom (later Hollywood on Television) from 1949 to 1952, and then her own sitcom, Life with Elizabeth from 1952 to 1956. Television personality Regis Philbin and actor/director Leonard Nimoy once worked behind the scenes at channel 13, and Oscar Levant had his own show on the station from 1958 to 1960.

On December 23, 1953, Copley Press (publishers of the San Diego Union-Tribune) purchased KLAC-TV. The station then changed its call letters to KCOP, which reflected their ownership. A Bing Crosby-led group purchased the station in June 1957. In 1959, the NAFI Corporation, which would later merge with Chris-Craft Boats to become Chris-Craft Industries, bought channel 13. NAFI/Chris-Craft would be channel 13's longest-tenured owner, running it for over 40 years.

For most of its first 46 years on the air, channel 13 was a typical general entertainment independent station. It was usually the third or fourth highest-rated independent in Southern California, trading the No. 3 spot with KHJ-TV (channel 9, now KCAL-TV). The station carried Operation Prime Time programming at least in 1978.

In the early 1980s, KCOP became one of the many stations in the U.S. to broadcast Star Fleet (aka X-Bomber), a science-fiction marionette series which originally debuted in Japan in 1980.

During the 1980s and early 1990s, it was the Los Angeles home of Star Trek: The Next Generation (as well as The Original Series before it, as early as 1970), The Arsenio Hall Show and Baywatch. KCOP was the original Los Angeles home of the syndicated version of Wheel of Fortune (its longtime announcer until his death in 2010, Charlie O'Donnell, was a former staff announcer and news anchor at KCOP). The station had also picked up Jeopardy! from KCBS-TV (channel 2) in 1985. Both game shows moved to KCBS-TV in 1989, and later to current home KABC-TV (channel 7) in 1992. Channel 13 aired select episodes of the Australian soap opera Neighbours from early June to late August 1991. The station tried airing movies six nights a week in 1992; however, they fared poorly.

KCOP partnered with WWOR-TV and MCA TV Entertainment on a two night programming block, Hollywood Premiere Network starting in October 1990. KCOP carried the Prime Time Entertainment Network programming service from 1993 to 1995. KCOP carried Spelling Premiere Network at its launch in August 1994 on Thursday nights.

=== UPN affiliation (1993–2006) ===
On October 27, 1993, Chris-Craft and its broadcasting subsidiary, United Television, partnered with Viacom's newly acquired subsidiary Paramount Pictures to form the United Paramount Network (UPN), making KCOP the network's Los Angeles affiliate. UPN debuted on January 16, 1995. In 1996, Viacom bought 50% of UPN from Chris-Craft. At the network's launch, which also served to launch Paramount's Star Trek: Voyager, KCOP served as UPN's West Coast "flagship" station under the "UPN Thirteen" branding. During the late 1990s, the station began carrying a large number of younger-leaning talk shows (such as The Ricki Lake Show, The Jenny Jones Show, and The Montel Williams Show), reality series, some sitcoms during the evening, and syndicated cartoons (such as Double Dragon) in the morning, as well as the popular anime series Sailor Moon.

KCOP-TV's final logo under UPN affiliation, used from 2002 to 2006. There was another variant without the "KCOP/DT" text.

In 2000, Viacom bought CBS and Chris-Craft's 50% ownership interest in UPN. On August 12, 2000, Chris-Craft agreed to sell its television stations to the Fox Television Stations subsidiary of News Corporation for $5.5 billion; a deal that was finalized on July 31, 2001, creating a duopoly with Fox O&O KTTV. Upon being sold to Fox, the Fox Kids weekday block moved to KCOP in the mid-afternoons, only for it to be discontinued nationwide in January 2002. KCOP still ran UPN's Disney's One Too block during the morning until the network ended the block's run in 2003. Soon after, the station ran an hour-long morning cartoon block (supplied by DIC Entertainment), but dropped cartoons entirely in September 2006. Channel 13 was the last local television station to air cartoons on weekdays; like the other local stations, the cartoons were replaced with infomercials. In a separate transaction from its purchase of UPN, Viacom purchased KCOP's rival, KCAL-TV, from Young Broadcasting on June 1, 2002. Rumors persisted that UPN would move to the higher-rated KCAL, reverting KCOP to independent station status. However, Viacom decided to continue operating KCAL as an independent, as Fox renewed affiliation agreements for its UPN-affiliated stations for four years, keeping the network's programming on KCOP.

=== From UPN onto MNTV ===
With Fox's acquisition of KCOP, the station abandoned its longtime Hollywood studios at 915 North La Brea Avenue (once home to the classic Barry & Enright-produced game shows The Joker's Wild and Tic-Tac-Dough, and short-lived B&E entry Play the Percentages) with KCOP's news and technical operations being moved into KTTV's facilities at the Fox Television Center in West Los Angeles in 2003. The La Brea Avenue studio was put up for sale, with Fox electing to keep the facility, remodeling it to house the first two seasons of the reality series Hell's Kitchen. It was eventually abandoned with fixtures in place, and became a haven for squatters who were evicted by police in May 2009. The studio was eventually torn down, and currently the site is now a Sprouts store, with a large apartment complex that opened November 2015.

On January 24, 2006, the Warner Bros. unit of Time Warner and CBS Corporation announced that the two companies would shut down UPN and The WB and combine the networks' respective programming to create a new "fifth" network called The CW. KTLA, which had been the market's WB affiliate since the network's January 1995 launch, became The CW's Los Angeles affiliate as part of a 10-year affiliation deal between the new network and KTLA's owner, Tribune Broadcasting.

=== MyNetworkTV affiliation (2006–present) ===
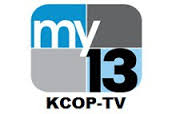
KCOP logo, used from 2006 to 2021.

The CW's initial affiliate list did not include any of Fox's UPN stations, but even without the Tribune affiliation deal, it is unlikely that KCOP would have been picked over KTLA as The CW's management was on record as preferring The WB and UPN's "strongest" affiliates—KTLA had led KCOP in the ratings dating back to when they were both independent stations. The day after the announcement of The CW's pending launch, on January 25, 2006, Fox dropped all network references from its UPN stations' on-air branding, and stopped promoting UPN's programs altogether. Accordingly, KCOP changed its branding from "UPN 13" to "Channel 13", and amended the station's 2002 logo to omit the UPN logo and just feature the boxed "13". On February 22, 2006, News Corporation announced the launch of a new "sixth" network called MyNetworkTV, which would have KCOP and the other Fox-owned UPN stations (plus independent station KDFI in Dallas–Fort Worth) as the core group of stations.

UPN continued to broadcast on stations across the country until September 15, 2006. While some of the network's affiliates that switched to MyNetworkTV (which commenced operations on September 5, 2006) aired the final two weeks of UPN programs outside of its recommended prime time slot, the Fox-owned stations, including KCOP, dropped UPN entirely on August 31, 2006. In September 2006, the station began identifying itself as "MyNetworkTV, Channel 13"; the branding changed again in May 2007, simplified to "My13 Los Angeles".

==== Rebranding to KCOP 13 and Fox 11 Plus; timeshifting of MyNetworkTV programming ====
KCOP 13 logo, used from July 2021 to January 2023. Currently used for on-air station identification purposes.

On July 12, 2021, KCOP-TV changed its on-air branding to KCOP 13, dropping the MyNetworkTV branding. The change of branding was accompanied by a move of MyNetworkTV programming to late night (see below) and carrying Decades (now Catchy Comedy) programming on weekdays from 10 a.m. to 2 pm, simulcasting the programming on sister KTTV's 11.4 subchannel.

As of September 14, 2015, the station began airing other programming in MyNetworkTV's traditional 8–10 p.m. timeslot, including TMZ Live and Hollywood Today Live; MyNetworkTV's schedule was thus carried out of prime time in late night from 11:30 p.m. to 1:30 a.m. on weeknights. This made KCOP the most high-profile station carrying MyNetworkTV to move it out of prime time, along with the first Fox-owned station to do so (Chicago-based WPWR-TV, licensed to Gary, Indiana, moved MyNetworkTV programming to 10 p.m.–midnight on September 1, 2016, after assuming that market's CW affiliation from Tribune-owned WGN-TV, taking The CW as its primary affiliation; WPWR would later move MyNetworkTV programming to 9–11 p.m. CT).

A year later, with the failure of Hollywood Today Live and KCOP's other alternate programming, KCOP returned MyNetworkTV back to the 8–10 p.m. slot. On July 12, 2021, MyNetworkTV's programming was again moved to late-nights (midnight to 2 a.m.), with off-network sitcoms filling prime time. As part of this, the station rebranded itself from "My13" to "KCOP 13".

Fox 11 Plus logo, used from January 2023 to 2026.

In January 2023, KCOP rebranded as "Fox 11 Plus", a branding scheme used by other Fox-owned MyNetworkTV stations that aligns them as a companion to their parent Fox station. On July 3, 2023, KCOP replaced the simulcast of Catchy Comedy programming with airings of Law & Order: Special Victims Unit from 10 a.m. to noon, followed by the syndicated Dateline and TMZ Live. The schedule change also eliminated airings of Fox Soul's Black Report and the Fox Weather programming segments. At some point between then and September, the MyNetworkTV schedule was moved to earlier in the day, from 2 p.m. to 4 p.m. However, starting the week of December 11, it was moved back to the traditional 8 p.m. to 10 p.m. slot, but eventually shifted to the 12 a.m. to 2 a.m. slot at some point later.

==== Rebranding to Fox Los Angeles + ====
As of September 2026, KCOP-TV was once again rebranded to "Fox Los Angeles +" as part of an effort by Fox to unify the branding of their MyNetworkTV affiliates.

== Programming ==
KCOP-TV may air Fox network programming should it be preempted by KTTV for long-form breaking news or severe weather coverage or other special programming.

=== Sports coverage ===
Channel 13 served as the broadcast home of the Los Angeles Marathon from its inception in 1986 until 2001, the NBA's Los Angeles Clippers from 1991 to 1996, MLB's Los Angeles Dodgers from 2002 to 2005, MLB's Los Angeles Angels from 2006 to 2019 and since 2021, MLS's Los Angeles FC from 2021 to 2022 and the NHL's Anaheim Ducks since 2024.

Like many local stations in the earlier years of television, KCOP hosted its own weekly Studio Wrestling show for many years during the 1970s. Stars such as Freddie Blassie, John Tolos, Rocky Johnson, André the Giant and The Sheik headlined the shows, with longtime local announcer Dick Lane behind the microphone calling the action. In later years, pro wrestling returned to KCOP by way of WWE's secondary flagship television program Smackdown!, which aired on the station from 1999 to 2006 (as a UPN affiliate) and again from 2008 to 2010 (as a MyNetworkTV O&O). In the past, Channel 13 also aired other wrestling programs, including World Class Championship Wrestling and the NWA. Channel 13 also televised live boxing matches, originating from the Grand Olympic Auditorium in downtown Los Angeles, on and off from the late 1960s until as recently as the mid-1990s, with legendary Los Angeles sportscaster Jim Healy calling the action in the early years.

From 2005 to 2007, KCOP carried St. Louis Rams preseason games produced by now-former corporate siblings Fox Sports Midwest and KTVI. Back in the 1950s during the team's early years in Los Angeles, the station broadcast many Rams regular season games before NFL games became more exclusive to the major broadcast networks (such as CBS, NBC and DuMont). However, in July 2008, the NFL's broadcast committee decided to no longer allow teams to broadcast preseason games beyond even their secondary markets. This was done more so to protect the league's broadcast partners, including KCBS-TV and KTLA, the respective local broadcasters of San Diego Chargers and Oakland Raiders preseason games.

From 2006 to 2011, KCOP held the broadcast television rights to Los Angeles Angels of Anaheim baseball; the team and Fox Sports West (now FanDuel Sports Network West) signed a 20-year broadcast deal beginning with the 2012 season, making 150 annual Angels telecasts exclusive to Fox Sports West, with select games airing on Prime Ticket (now FanDuel Sports Network SoCal), although KCOP still serves as an occasional overflow outlet. In the 2021 MLB season, KCOP was scheduled to air at least four Angels games due to delays in the NBA and NHL seasons caused by the COVID-19 pandemic. In 2022, 2023 and 2024, KCOP carried one spring training game between the Angels and the Dodgers featuring the Angels broadcasters. In 2025, KCOP and the Angels announced that 12 Sunday games would be simulcast on KCOP and FanDuel Sports Network West. That package would be the largest amount of Angels games to air on the station since 2011. One additional Thursday game in May aired exclusively on KCOP due to conflicts on FanDuel Sports Network West.

Due to its previous common ownership with Fox Sports West and Prime Ticket, KCOP served as an overflow channel for Bally Sports West and Bally Sports SoCal. During the 2011–12 season, KCOP aired Game 6 of the Clippers playoff series versus the Memphis Grizzlies on May 11. Over-the-air coverage of the Clippers moved to KTLA prior to the 2022–23 season; Kings over-the-air coverage moved to KCAL-TV prior to the 2023–24 season.

During the 2017 NFL season, KCOP aired two Los Angeles Chargers home games as an overflow for the NFL on Fox during weeks when CBS had the doubleheader, but the Los Angeles Rams were on KTTV.

In 2021, KCOP announced an agreement with Los Angeles FC of Major League Soccer to broadcast select matches alongside Bally Sports SoCal. In 2022, KCOP expanded its agreement to air games previously aired by Bally Sports. LAFC games moved exclusively to MLS Season Pass prior to the 2023 season. However, in February 2025, KCOP aired LAFC, LA Galaxy and Angel City FC matches from the Coachella Valley Invitational preseason tournament. In April 2025, KCOP announced a new agreement with LAFC to air encore matches on Tuesday nights.

On August 27, 2024, the Ducks announced that they would not renew their contract with Bally Sports, and would partner with both KCOP-TV and the Dallas Stars' free ad-supported streaming television (FAST) platform Victory+ to air all of its regional games, beginning in the 2024–25 NHL season. Selected games will air on KTTV.

=== News operation ===
For many years, KCOP aired a prime time newscast at 10 p.m., as well as a weekday afternoon newscast at 2 p.m. during the late 1970s and early 1980s. During the 1980s, the station paired its local 10 p.m. program with the syndicated Independent Network News (which was produced by New York City's WPIX). Channel 13's news programs generally were the lowest-rated evening newscasts of the seven VHF television stations in the Los Angeles market. The newscast's length varied from 30 minutes to an hour depending on the station's budget. An ambitious attempt to relaunch KCOP's news operation came in January 1993, when the 10 p.m. newscast was renamed Real News and introduced a new format that featured anchors moving around the station's newsroom (similar to the format pioneered by CITY-TV in Toronto), in-depth reports, and newsmagazine elements. However, the new format, which accompanied technological improvements and an expansion of the news staff, did not pay off in the ratings, and Real News was scaled back to a half-hour on weeknights in May 1994, with the anchors now seated at a desk, with weekend newscasts being cut entirely. Shortly after this, the newscast was rebranded as UPN News 13. For a brief period of time during the late 1990s, KCOP tried airing a half-hour newscast at 3:30 p.m. weekdays, later airing it at 7:30 p.m. weeknights. However, when the station was purchased by Fox and its operations were merged with KTTV, channel 13's newscast was moved to 11 p.m. to avoid direct competition with channel 11 (which runs an hour-long 10 p.m. newscast), and trimmed it from an hour in length down to 30 minutes. The station's news production and resources also began to be handled by KTTV.

After Fox purchased the station, KCOP's late-evening newscast took a more unconventional approach than its network-owned competition, KCBS-TV, KABC-TV and KNBC (channel 4). To appeal to a younger audience, it mainly featured its female news anchors in slightly more revealing, trendy clothing. Its news stories also tend to be much shorter in detail, in a faster-paced format. In addition, it became the first station to emphasize entertainment and trend-setting feature stories as a major part of its format, an idea that attracted a large young demographic. Nevertheless, channel 13's newscasts continually placed fourth in the ratings, as it did when the station was competing at 10 p.m. against KTTV, KTLA and KCAL-TV. However, KCOP's news drew substantially higher ratings among younger viewers, especially young Latinos.

On April 10, 2006, KCOP's newscast was expanded from 30 minutes to one hour, which made it the only Los Angeles station with an hour-long newscast at 11 pm. On August 14, 2006, the newscast was rebranded as My13 News to reflect the station's pending MyNetworkTV affiliation. With the purchase by Fox, many of KCOP's former staff either left the station or were released, reporter Hal Eisner was one of the remaining staffers who had been with KCOP since the Chris-Craft era, beginning there in the early 1990s. Before that, however, he had worked at KTTV for a time from 1987 to 1988. Today, Eisner files reports for KTTV.

On December 1, 2008, KCOP shortened its 11 p.m. newscast to a half-hour, which became anchored by KTTV's 10 p.m. anchors Christine Devine and Carlos Amezcua, as it was considered an extension of the earlier newscast; the newscast's retitling to Fox News at 11 marked the end of a KCOP-branded and produced newscast. On September 10, 2012, KCOP launched a half-hour 7 p.m. newscast on weeknights that also used the Fox News branding; the newscast was also anchored by Amezcua and Devine. On August 9, 2013, KCOP announced the cancellation of its 7 and 11 p.m. newscasts, ending a five-decade run of news programming on the station; its final newscast aired on September 22, 2013.

In 2018 and 2022, KCOP aired Good Day L.A. from 7 to 9 a.m. due to KTTV airing select FIFA World Cup matches in the morning. This marked a temporary return to news programming on KCOP since the cancellation of KTTV-produced newscasts in 2013. On March 3, 2025, KTTV launched LA Live News Tonight, a weeknight prime time newscast from 8 to 10 p.m., which directly competes with KCAL-TV. KTTV's 11 p.m. newscast, Good Nite LA, is simulcast on KCOP.

==== Notable alumni ====
- Ross Becker – anchor
- Harold Dow
- Tom Duggan
- Harris Faulkner
- Hal Fishman
- Sallie Fiske
- Gary Franklin
- Vic "The Brick" Jacobs
- Robert Kovacik
- Tawny Little
- Larry McCormick
- José Mota
- Kent Ninomiya
- Charlie O'Donnell
- Warren Olney
- Regis Philbin
- Bill Press
- George Putnam
- Lauren Sánchez
- Bill Seward
- Mark Thompson
- Betty White

== Technical information ==
=== Subchannels ===
The station's ATSC 1.0 channels are carried on the multiplexed signals of other Los Angeles television stations:

Subchannels provided by KCOP-TV (ATSC 1.0)
Subchannel	Res.	Short name	Programming	ATSC 1.0 host
13.1	720p	KCOP DT	Main KCOP-TV programming	KTLA
13.2	480i	BUZZR	Buzzr	KCBS-TV
13.3	480i	MOVIES!	Movies!	KNBC
13.4	480i	HEROES	Heroes & Icons	KTTV

On November 4, 2011, Fox Television Stations signed an affiliation agreement with Bounce TV for KCOP and its New York City-area sister station WWOR-TV. KCOP began carrying Bounce TV on digital subchannel 13.2 on March 8, 2012 (WWOR added the network on its 9.3 subchannel two weeks earlier on February 24). The network has also been added to the subchannels of Fox-owned MyNetworkTV stations in five other markets: WUTB in Baltimore, KUTP in Phoenix, WRBW in Orlando, KDFI in Dallas–Fort Worth and WFTC in Minneapolis–Saint Paul; the Baltimore affiliation had since moved to a subchannel of ABC affiliate WMAR-TV, soon after Fox sold-off MyNetworkTV outlet WUTB to Deerfield Media. In three other markets where Fox owns MyNetworkTV stations (WPWR-TV in Chicago, KTXH in Houston and WDCA in Washington, D.C.), Bounce TV is carried on the subchannel space of other competing stations in those markets.

As a result of Bounce TV signing a new carriage agreement with Univision Communications in 2014, the network moved to the third subchannel of Univision owned-and-operated station KMEX (channel 34) on March 9, 2015. Buzzr, a new digital multicast network focusing on classic game shows, which is a joint venture of FremantleMedia (most notably, the owners of the Mark Goodson and Reg Grundy libraries among others) and KCOP's parent company, Fox Television Stations, debuted on channel 13.2 on June 1, 2015.

On September 18, 2015, Weigel Broadcasting and Fox Television Stations announced an affiliation agreement to carry diginet Heroes & Icons on subchannels of Fox-owned stations in New York City, Los Angeles, Dallas, San Francisco, Washington, D.C., Phoenix, Detroit, Tampa, Orlando and Charlotte beginning October 1, 2015.

=== Analog-to-digital conversion ===
KCOP-TV shut down its analog signal, over VHF channel 13, on June 12, 2009, as part of the federally mandated transition from analog to digital television. The station's digital signal relocated from its transition period UHF channel 66, which was among the high band UHF channels (52–69) that were removed from broadcasting use as a result of the transition, to its analog-era VHF channel 13.

=== ATSC 3.0 lighthouse ===
Subchannels of KCOP-TV (ATSC 3.0)
Subchannel	Res.	Short name	Programming
2.1	1080p	KCBS NX	CBS (KCBS-TV)
4.1	1080p	KNBC NX	NBC (KNBC)
5.1	1080p	KTLA HD	The CW (KTLA)
11.1	1080p	KTTV NX	Fox (KTTV)
13.1	1080p	KCOP NX	Main KCOP-TV programming

Subchannel broadcast with digital rights management

=== Translators ===
- K21MH-D Daggett
- K27ON-D Lucerne Valley
- K30GU-D Morongo Valley
- K33ID-D Ridgecrest
- K17GJ-D Twentynine Palms
