= Island City (1994 film) =

- Genre: Science Fiction
- Created by: Jonathan Glassner
- Developed by: Jonathan Glassner
- Starring: Kevin Conroy; Brenda Strong; Eric McCormack; Constance Marie
- Country of origin: United States
- Original language: English

Production
- Executive producers: Jonathan Glassner; Bruce J. Sallan
- Producer: Christopher Chulack
- Production location: Irving, Texas
- Running time: 95 minutes
- Production companies: Lee Rich Productions; Warner Bros. Television

Original release
- Network: PTEN
- Release: March 2, 1994

Island City is a science fiction television pilot movie that was aired by Prime Time Entertainment Network in 1994. The film was produced by Lee Rich Productions in association with Lorimar Television. It is the last TV film to be produced by Lorimar after the company shut down in 1993. Due to low ratings and the high costs associated with producing a sci-fi television show, no other episodes were filmed.

== Premise ==
In the future, humanity develops a "fountain of youth" drug, but as many people around the world begin to take it, most begin to mutate into a barbaric proto-humanoid state. The few people immune to this side-effect of the drug band together and live in a futuristic city while the mutants live in the vast wasteland outside its gates. In an effort to save the human race and understand what went wrong, the city sends out research missions in fortified vehicles to bring back mutated humans for research, and to rescue healthy humans. The film focuses on one such squad of soldiers and scientists.

During one of their missions into the wasteland, the team comes under attack and one of their own is captured by the mutants. The rest of the movie, which was meant to serve as an introductory episode of a series, deals with the main characters coping with the loss of their friend and organizing a search-and-rescue mission, while secondary characters allow the viewer to explore various facets of life in the city.

The movie touches on many themes including genetic experimentation, virtual reality, and state-controlled marriages. Citizens of the city wear a colored crystal on their sternum based on the individual's genetic makeup, and can mate only with other citizens of the same color. Progeny resulting from people of two different colors would have the genetic mutation that, when combined with the "fountain of youth" drug, created the race of proto-humanoids.

Another plot line focuses on the morality of a "fountain of youth" drug. One of the lead female roles is married to a man who did not take the drug because he believed it immoral. Her husband has aged normally into his 60s or 70s while his wife remains physically and visually in her mid 30s.

The film features virtual reality goggles. The son of the missing soldier uses the goggles to study and do his history homework, and also to spend time fishing with his father. He also attempts to fulfill his sexual fantasies, but a parental block prevents his fantasy girl from removing her top.

== Cast ==
- Kevin Conroy as Col. Tom Valdoon
- Brenda Strong as Dr. Sammy Helding
- Eric McCormack as Greg 23
- Pete Koch as Lt Michael Mendi
- Constance Marie as Connie Sealle
