= BHC Communications =

American communications holding company

BHC Communications, Inc.
- Formerly: BHC, Incorporated
- Type: Public Subsidiary
- Traded as: AMEX: BHC
- Industry: Broadcast television
- Founded: 1977; 49 years ago
- Defunct: July 31, 2001; 25 years ago
- Fate: Sold to News Corporation
- Successor: Fox Television Stations
- Key people: Herbert J. Siegel, chairman/CEO; William Siegel, president (1996–2001)
- Revenue: $443.5 million (1997)
- Parent: Chris-Craft Industries
- Divisions: United Sales Enterprises; PTEN; UPN (1995–2000)
- Subsidiaries: Pinelands, Inc.; United Television, Inc.; Chris-Craft Television, Inc.; KCOP Television, Inc.; Oregon Television, Inc.

BHC Communications, Inc. was the holding company for the broadcast property of Chris-Craft Industries. BHC stands for "broadcasting holding company".

== History ==
The firm was originally incorporated in 1977 as BHC, Incorporated by Chris-Craft Industries to hold its two existing incorporated independent television stations, KCOP Television (KCOP-TV in Los Angeles) and Oregon Television (KPTV in Portland, Oregon), within BHC's Chris-Craft Television subsidiary. That same year, Chris-Craft purchased a share of 20th Century Fox. In 1981, the 20th Century Fox share, then at 20 percent, was traded for 19% of United Television. United owned three other television stations: independent KMSP-TV in Minneapolis, ABC affiliate KTVX in Salt Lake City, and NBC affiliate KMOL-TV (now WOAI-TV) in San Antonio.

Warner Communications, Inc. purchased a 42.5 percent share in BHC for $200 million in convertible preferred stock. With the Time, Inc./Warner Communications, Inc. merger into Time-Warner, Inc., BHC got a return of some stock held by Warner, cash, and Time Warner convertible preferred stock in Time Warner, a total of valued at $2.3 billion over a six-year period. With this settlement, BHC was reincorporated as BHC Communications, Inc. with stock restructured with two classes of stock giving Chris-Craft most of the voting power. Some BHC's shares were distributed to other Warner stockholders made it a publicly traded corporation. Some the payment were used to buy back BHC class A shares. WWOR-TV, an independent station (and national superstation) in the New York City area, was purchased in 1992 for $313 million. In 1995, United Sales Enterprises was formed to hand national spot advertising time for all BHC/United stations.

Chris-Craft TV teamed up with MCA Television for a syndicated programming block, Hollywood Premiere Network, for only the 1990–1991 season. In the early 1990s, BHC formed an alternative programming consortium, Prime Time Entertainment Network, with other station groups and Time Warner-owned Warner Bros. Domestic Television that was planned to expand into the fifth television network.

In January 1995, BHC affiliated all of its stations, except the Salt Lake City and San Antonio outlets, with the newly launched United Paramount Network, which it fully owned and financed but ran with Paramount/Viacom, the network's producer. In December 1996, Paramount exercised its option to buy half of the Network by paying half of the losses ($160 million). Included in the deal was to continue selling UPN "Star Trek: Voyager" instead of placing it in syndication.

In the late 1990s, BHC acquired two television stations, WHSW (now WUTB) in Baltimore, Maryland, and WRBW in Orlando, Florida, it resulted in the increase of BHC's number of television stations to ten.

In 1999, Viacom announced plans to merge with CBS Corporation. Because of a regulation upheld by the FCC years ago, prohibiting companies from owning two broadcast networks. Viacom's announcement raised questions regarding the future of Chris-Craft and Viacom's joint ownership of UPN. In Viacom and Chris-Craft's original agreement, two options for exiting the partnership had been determined—buying out the other partner or paying for what the partner had invested up to that date and providing funds for the future operation of UPN. Either option would cost Viacom substantial sums of money. Industry analysts agreed that Chris-Craft could emerge the winner and offered other possible scenarios—that Viacom might offer Chris-Craft some of its stations in exchange for severing the partnership or that Chris-Craft might sell Viacom's share to another company.

In 2000, a lawsuit was filed by BHC against the Viacom-CBS merger as BHC saw this as a breach of the UPN partnership. BHC lost the suit and sold its remaining ownership in UPN to Viacom for $5 million. Shortly thereafter, Chris-Craft announced that it was getting out of broadcasting after losing $500 million on UPN, the possibility of UPN shutting down or having their affiliation pulled. Many industry observers thought Viacom would end up getting the stations, but Viacom's bid lost out to News Corporation's Fox Television Stations, resulting in a sale which closed on July 31, 2001.

== Former stations ==
- Stations are arranged in alphabetical order by state and city of license.
- Two boldface asterisks appearing following a station's call letters (**) indicate a station built and signed on by BHC Communications.

Stations owned by BHC Communications
Media market	State	Station	Purchased	Sold	Notes
Phoenix	Arizona	KUTP **	1985	2001	
Los Angeles	California	KCOP-TV	1977	2001	(Note: Owned directly by Chris-Craft prior to the formation of BHC in 1977.)
San Francisco	California	KBHK-TV	1983	2001	
Orlando	Florida	WRBW	1998	2001	
Baltimore	Maryland	WUTB	1998	2001	
Minneapolis–St. Paul	Minnesota	KMSP-TV	1981	2001	(Note: Owned by United Television prior to its merger with Chris-Craft in 1981.)
New York City	New York	WWOR-TV	1992	2001	
Portland	Oregon	KPTV	1977	2001	
San Antonio	Texas	KMOL-TV	1981	2001	
Salt Lake City	Utah	KTVX	1981	2001	

== United Television ==
United Television, Inc.
- Type: Subsidiary
- Industry: Broadcast television
- Founded: 1956; 70 years ago
- Defunct: 2001; 25 years ago
- Fate: Sold
- Successor: Fox Television Stations
- Key people: John Siegel, chairman (1996–2001)
- Products: Television Stations (4833)
- Parent: Fox (?–1983); BHC Communications (1983–2001)
- Divisions: United Television Sales

United Television was a corporation founded in 1956 to run station KMSP-TV in Minneapolis. In 1975, United purchased KTVX, a Salt Lake City ABC affiliate, and KMOL-TV, a San Antonio NBC affiliate. Fox purchased an interest in the company, making it a subsidiary, and in 1980 briefly considered purchasing NBC affiliate WRBT in Baton Rouge prior to the interest change in 1981. In 1981, BHC/Chris-Craft traded its interest in 20th Century Fox to Marvin Davis and Marc Rich for a 19% interest in United. BHC upped its stake in United to 50.1 percent of common stock in 1983. A UHF station was acquired that same year in San Francisco. In the final quarter of 1985, United started a new UHF station in Phoenix, KUTP. Loaning its name to a network joint venture of its parent corporation BHC with Paramount Pictures, most of United stations switch programming to United Paramount Network.

In January 1998, United Television acquired a third UHF station in Baltimore for $80 million, changed its call letters to WUTB, and made the station a UPN affiliate. United, in October 1997, agreed to purchase WRBW (channel 65), a UHF station and UPN affiliate in Orlando, Florida, for $60 million and possible further considerations. In April 1998, United took a minority stake in Bohbot Entertainment & Media. 20th Century Fox later returned to interest in the broadcast industry when in 1986, it purchased 6 stations from Metromedia, which these stations became affiliated with Fox's new Fox Broadcasting Company, which was first aired in late 1986. Fox later reacquired United Television's stations as part of the acquisition of BHC by the latter in 2001.
