= Ramblin' Rod Anders =

American television presenter (1933–2002)

- Anders with his trademark buttons
- Born: November 26, 1932
- Died: May 11, 2002 (aged 69); Portland, Oregon, U.S.
- Occupation: Television host on KPTV
- Years active: 1950s - 1997
- Known for: Television personality

Ramblin' Rod Anders (November 26, 1932 – May 11, 2002), born Rodney Carl Andersen, was an American television personality and the host of The Ramblin' Rod Show, a children's television program broadcast on KPTV channel 12 in Portland, Oregon, from August 26, 1964 until his retirement on August 8, 1997. Anders was well known locally for his iconic, button-covered sweater which he wore on air.

== Biography ==
Anders was born at St. Vincent's Hospital near Beaverton, Oregon and grew up in Multnomah County. He began his broadcasting career in the 1950s, singing and playing records on Saturday mornings for radio station KTIL in Tillamook. Anders worked at KTIL until he was drafted into the armed forces, where he served as a radio repairman. After his discharge, he returned to radio, filling on-air positions beginning in 1958 at KFLW in Klamath Falls, Oregon and continuing to Portland radio stations KXL and KPOJ.

In 1964, while working for KPOJ, Anders heard of an opening for a host on a Portland children's TV show called Popeye's Pier 12 on KPTV, channel 12. He replaced host Bob Adkins (better known as "Addie Bobkins"). In the early 1970s, the show was renamed The Ramblin' Rod Show.

By the late 1970s, Anders had begun to wear message buttons on his cardigan, which were given to him by children appearing on the show. Within a few years, his cardigan was almost completely covered. At his retirement in 1997, the host estimated that he had received around 25,000 buttons.

Each year, Anders hosted local KPTV coverage of the Jerry Lewis MDA Labor Day Telethon and the Easter Seals Telethon. He also served as an in-house KPTV announcer and as a moderator on a Saturday morning public affairs show, 12 in the Morning. Anders also appeared in many commercials for various local businesses including two Portland area automobile dealerships, Beaverton Toyota and Mike Salta Pontiac. Anders retired in August, 1997 after 33 years with KPTV.

In 1994, Anders constructed the Apple Valley Airport on land near his log cabin home in Buxton, Oregon, west of Portland. During his retirement, he enjoyed flying and spending time with family.

On May 11, 2002, Anders died suddenly while making a personal appearance at a Volunteers of America Thrift Store located at SE 181st and Division streets in Gresham. He was 69 years old. Anders was entombed in the mausoleum of the IOOF Cemetery in Tillamook, Oregon.

== The Show ==
According to an article that appeared in the Eugene Register-Guard, the premise of The Ramblin' Rod Show was that children "love slapstick comedy... and kids love to see themselves on television, which is why Anders insisted on the individual shots of each child." The show was very popular, with a 20-25% share in its time slot and an audience that was often booked a month in advance.

Anders' show was originally called Popeye's Pier 12 and featured Popeye cartoons and had several marine-themed characters which were later dropped after the program was renamed The Ramblin' Rod Show around 1971 and began showing Hanna-Barbera and Warner Bros. cartoons. Each show began with Anders arriving on the set in a mobile tug-boat prop. The simple format of The Ramblin' Rod Show remained the same throughout Anders' tenure. The host introduced the children, spoke with them, celebrated birthdays, showed cartoons, and hosted smile contests. In the early years, Anders played guitar and had a skunk puppet named Petunia, which was retired in later years. Beginning in the 1980s, Chuck E. Cheese and his Pizzatime Players would visit and perform a song and dance number with the audience, usually to slightly altered Americana songs such as "Dancing in the Street".

In the 1960s, winners of the smile contest frequently won Roller Derby Street King Shoe Skates. During the early 1970s, contest winners and children celebrating their birthdays were entitled to complimentary Homer Pies (a type of ice cream sandwich), Archway brand cookies and Grandma's Cookies; in the late '70s, Pop Shoppe soda pop was also given to smile contest winners .

== Krusty the Clown inspiration ==
A decades-old rumor claims that Ramblin' Rod inspired Matt Groening to create the character Krusty the Clown, the bitter host of a fictional children's program on The Simpsons. Groening, who grew up in Portland, was likely aware of Anders' show on KPTV. However, in interviews, Groening has mentioned that it was Ramblin' Rod's predecessor on KPTV, a somewhat melancholy clown named Rusty Nails, who was the creation of Jim Allen and served as a partial inspiration for the character of Krusty.

== Trivia ==
In autumn of 2011, the Fizz Soda and Candy Shop, located in Portland, created a shrine to Ramblin' Rod. KPTV donated his microphone and an original Ramblin' Rod button to the shrine.

Fizz Soda and Candy Shop was later renamed Cosmic, and closed in 2014., with no mention of what became of the Ramblin' Rod shrine.

== See also ==
- List of local children's television series (United States)
