= Apple Valley Airport (Oregon) =

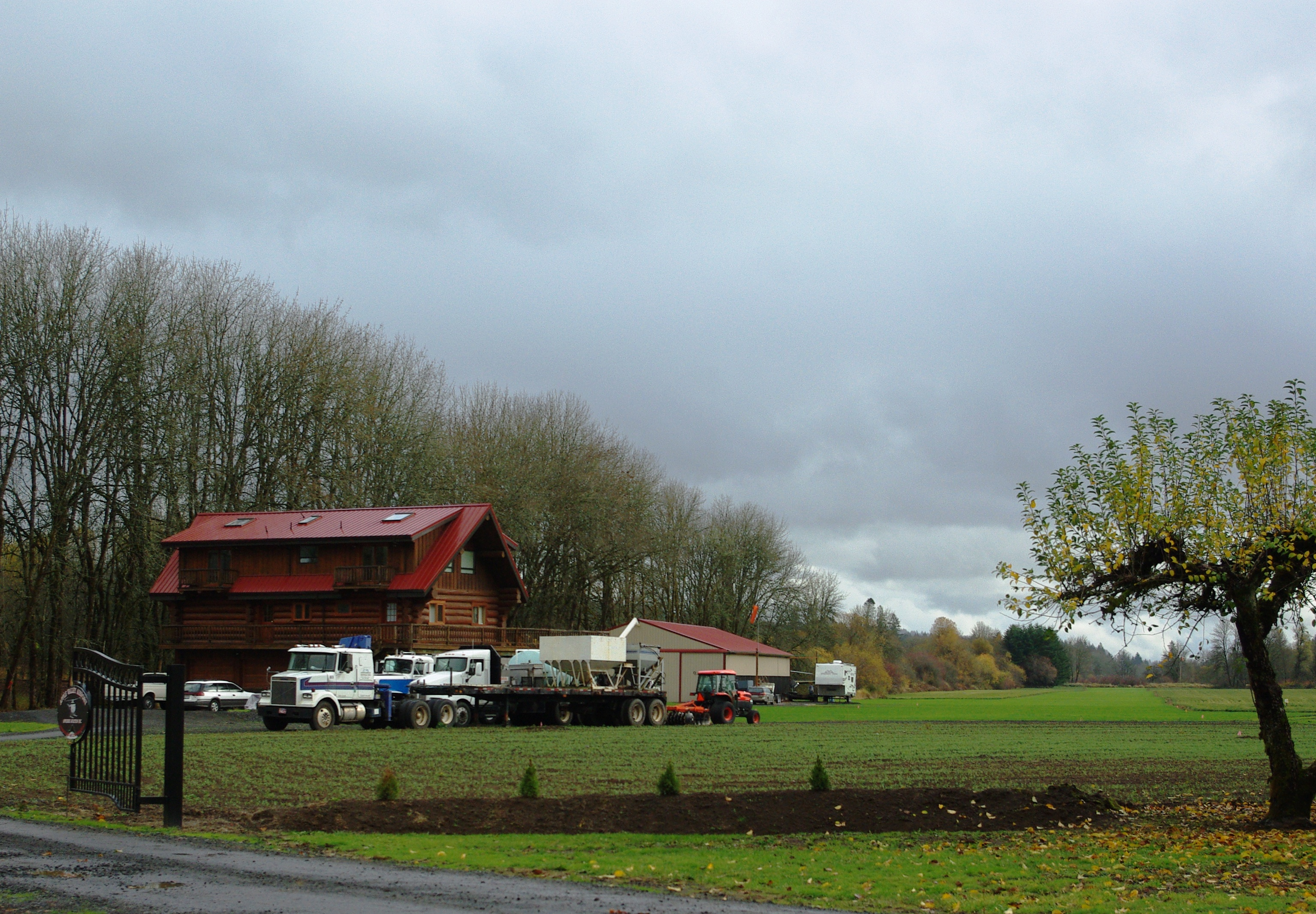
- Entrance
- IATA: none; ICAO: none; FAA LID: OR61

Summary
- Airport type: Private
- Owner: Michael and Jennie Applebee
- Location: Buxton, Oregon
- Elevation AMSL: 247 ft / 75 m
- Coordinates: 45°40′42.40″N 123°11′10.40″W
- Interactive map of Apple Valley Airport

Runways
Direction	Length		Surface
Direction	ft	m	Surface
11/29	2,470	752	Turf

Apple Valley Airport (FAA LID: OR61) is a private airport located one mile southeast of Buxton in Washington County, Oregon, United States. Built in 1994 by a Portland TV personality Rod Anders, the subsequent owners have pushed to expand operations at the airport. Near U.S. 26 west of the Portland metropolitan area, the 2,470 feet (750 m) long turf airstrip is used for agricultural operations.

== History ==
The airstrip was constructed in 1994 by Rod Anders, known as "Ramblin' Rod" to Portland TV viewers, for his private airplane alongside his log cabin home. In 2004, Mike and Jennie Applebee purchased the property and airstrip from the estate of Anders. In 2005, the owner announced plans to convert the airstrip into a commercial operation and include services such as flight training. Owner Jim Applebee was issued citations by the county in June 2005 for operations at the airport. Neighbors formed a group to oppose the conversion and hired an attorney. The application failed as incomplete and the citations were dismissed by the court.

In 2006, the owners filed again with the county to expand the use of the airport, which was to include commercial use and the basing of ten aircraft with usage to total 3,016 departures each year. A land-use meeting was held in September 2006, with the county denying the application for commercial use at the airport. In 2007, the Applebees appealed the county's decision to the Oregon Land Use Board of Appeals (LUBA), but lost the decision in June. Later LUBA sent part of the case back to the county and the Applebees were allowed to have agricultural operations at the airstrip, but they dropped an appeal to the Oregon Court of Appeals in November 2007 and announced plans to sell the property. In October 2008, the Applebees received initial approval to expand the airport grounds by adding a hangar, parking lot, and helipad.

== Details ==
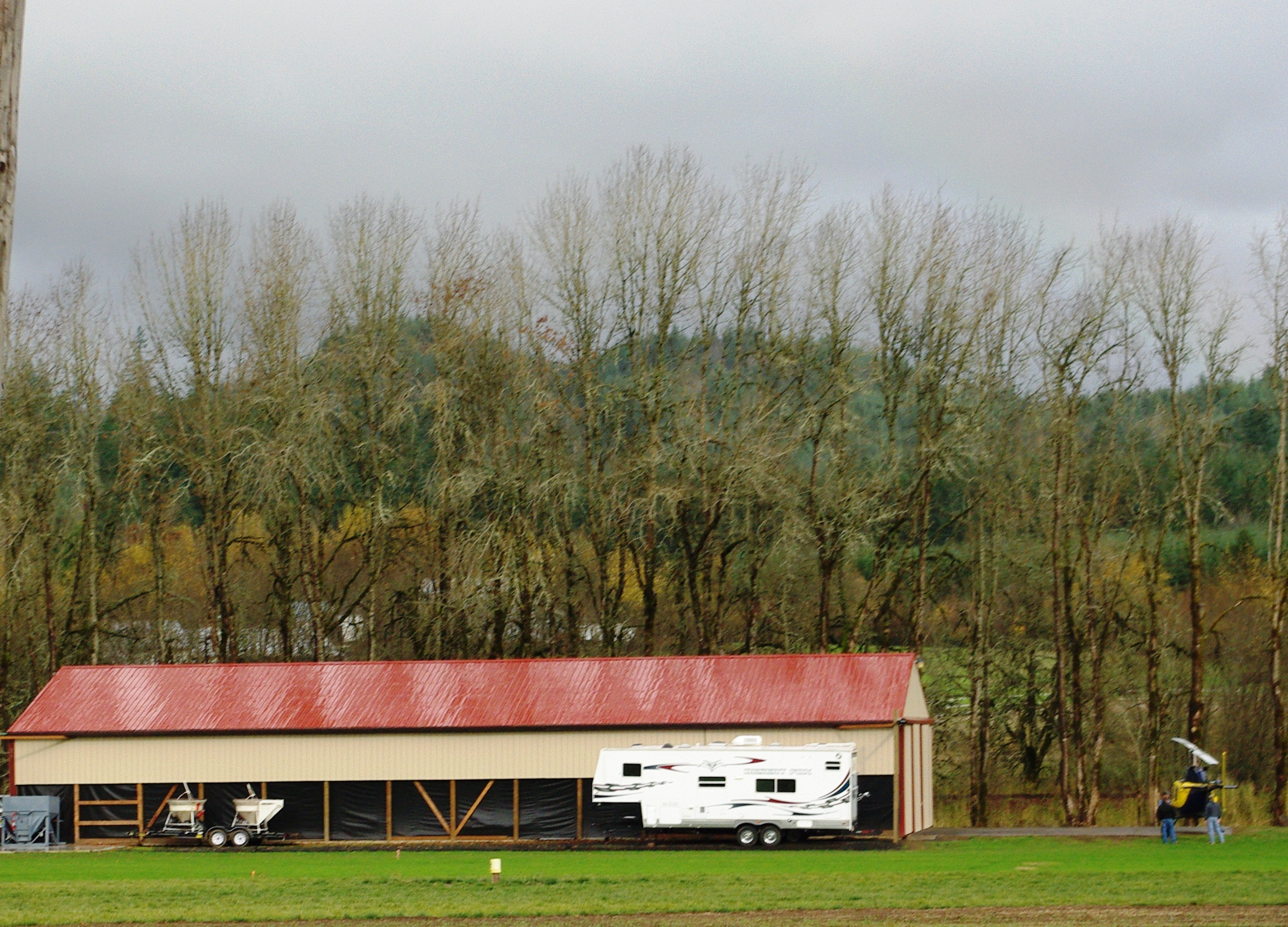
Helicopter at the airport in 2009

The 2,470 feet (750 m) long grass strip runway is located in rural Washington County near the community of Buxton, adjacent to the Sunset Highway. Owned by SK Farms, the airport is east of Fisher Road on the north side of the highway in the foothills of the Northern Oregon Coast Range. The airport is used as a base for agricultural based aviation such as spraying crops with pesticides and fertilizers. An unattended private facility, it is at an elevation of 247 feet (75 m) above sea level with a runway alignment of 11/29.
