= UPN =

American television network (1995–2006)

United Paramount Network
- Final logo used from 2002 to 2006
- Type: Defunct broadcast television network
- Country: United States
- Affiliates: List of former UPN affiliates
- Headquarters: Los Angeles, California

Ownership
- Owner: United Television & Paramount Television (1995–2000); Viacom (2000–2005); CBS Corporation (2005–2006)
- Parent: UPT Partnership G.P. (1995–2000); UPN (general partnership) (2000–2006)

History
- Founded: October 27, 1993; 33 years ago (33 years, 21 days)
- Launched: January 16, 1995; 31 years ago (31 years, 305 days)
- Founder: United Television (a subsidiary of Chris-Craft Industries) and Paramount Television (a subsidiary of Viacom)
- Closed: September 15, 2006; 20 years ago (20 years, 63 days)
- Replaced by: The CW

Links
- Website: upn.com

The United Paramount Network (UPN) was an American broadcast television network founded on October 27, 1993. It operated from January 16, 1995 to September 15, 2006. It merged with The WB to form The CW on September 18, 2006.

UPN was originally a joint venture between Chris-Craft Industries (later sold to News Corporation's subsidiary, United Television) and Viacom's then-recently acquired subsidiary, Paramount Television (which produced most of UPN's programming), then became solely owned by Viacom in 2000 after subsequently purchasing Chris-Craft's remaining stake. On December 31, 2005, UPN was kept by CBS Corporation, which was the new name for Viacom when it split into two separate companies. On January 24, 2006, CBS Corporation and Time Warner jointly announced that the companies would shut down UPN and competitor The WB to launch a new joint venture network later that year. UPN ceased broadcasting on September 15, 2006, with The WB following two days later. Select programs from both networks moved to the new network, The CW, when it launched on September 18, 2006.

== History ==
=== 1948–1994: Origins of the network ===
Paramount Pictures had played a pivotal role in the development of network television. It was a partner in the DuMont Television Network, and the Paramount Theaters chain, which was spun off from the corporate/studio parent and merged with ABC in a deal that helped cement that network's status as a major network. The Paramount Television Network was launched in 1948, but dissolved in the 1950s.

Paramount had long had plans for its own television network with the Paramount Television Service. Set to launch in early 1978, it would have run its programming for only one night a week. Thirty "Movies of the Week" would have followed Star Trek: Phase II on Saturday nights. Plans for the new network were scrapped when sufficient advertising slots could not be sold, though Paramount would contribute some programs to Operation Prime Time, such as the mini-series A Woman Called Golda, and the weekly pop music program, Solid Gold. Star Trek: Phase II was reworked as the theatrical film, Star Trek: The Motion Picture, absorbing the costs already incurred from the aborted television series.

Paramount, and its eventual parent Viacom (which bought the studio's then-parent, Paramount Communications, in 1994), continued to consider launching their own television network. Independent stations, even more than network affiliates, were feeling the growing pressure of audience erosion to cable television in the 1980s and 1990s; there were unaffiliated commercial television stations in most of the major television markets, even after the foundation of Fox in 1986. Meanwhile, Paramount, which had long been successful in syndication with repeats of Star Trek, launched several first-run syndicated series by the 1990s, including Entertainment Tonight, The Arsenio Hall Show, Friday the 13th: The Series, War of the Worlds, Star Trek: The Next Generation, and Star Trek: Deep Space Nine.

In 1993, Time Warner and Chris-Craft Industries entered into a joint venture to distribute programs via a prime time programming service, the Prime Time Entertainment Network (PTEN), which is UPN's partial parent. Chris-Craft later became a partner in UPN, and Time Warner launched The WB in a joint venture with the Tribune Company at roughly the same time.

=== 1994–1999: Launch and early years ===
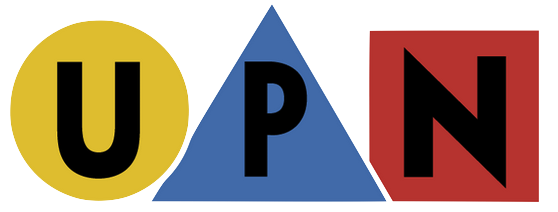
The original UPN logo, used from 1995 to 1999, and in various iterations from 1997 to 2002 (though the "primary colors" variant continued on some affiliates and in print advertising until 2002).

Silver variant of UPN logo, used from 1997 to 2002.

Paramount formed the Paramount Stations Group in 1991 when it purchased the assets of the TVX Broadcast Group, which owned several independent stations in major markets. This was not unlike the purchase of the Metromedia stations by News Corporation five years earlier, which were used as the nucleus for Fox. In another parallel, 20th Century Fox (the News Corporation subsidiary behind the Fox network, which was spun off with the company's other entertainment assets to 21st Century Fox on June 28, 2013 before Disney acquired them on March 20, 2019), like Paramount, had long been a powerhouse in television syndication. All indicators suggested that Paramount was about to launch a network of its own.

In April 1993, the Federal Communications Commission ended the fin-syn rules that prohibited networks from owning the rerun rights to programs they broadcast. Fear that networks would stop buying programs from independent studios was another reason for Paramount to start a network.

On October 27, 1993, Viacom and Chris-Craft announced the formation of a new television network, later to be named the United Paramount Network, with initial plans to run two hours of programming in prime time for two nights per week. The new network would be co-owned by United & Paramount Television, while most of its shows were to be produced by Paramount Television.

Initially, the network was to simply be called "U", but the "U Network" trademark was held by the now-defunct National Association of College Broadcasters (NACB), which had been operating a satellite television programming network featuring programs largely produced by college students since 1991. The founder and first head of UPN, Lucie Salhany, approached NACB with an offer of US$50,000 to transfer the name. Due to the costs related to rebranding the student network, and under the advice of its then-volunteer legal counsel, Cary Tepper, the non-profit association countered with a request of $100,000, which Salhany refused. At one point, the network was set to be titled the U/P Network before its current name was decided. Ultimately, the "U" in UPN stood for Chris-Craft subsidiary United Television, which owned the network's two largest stations, WWOR-TV in New York City and KCOP-TV in Los Angeles; the "P" represented Paramount Television, the studio that formed a programming partnership with Chris-Craft to create the network. Chris-Craft and Paramount/Viacom each owned independent stations in several large and mid-sized U.S. cities, and these stations formed the nuclei of the new network.

Warner Bros. announced plans to launch a similar network, which would become known as The WB, in close proximity to UPN. The belief that a new broadcast network could grow to be competitive was predicated on the idea that the network in question would not have a fledgling rival to contend with. With the change in landscape, the joint understanding of assured defeat prompted executives from Viacom and Time Warner (at the time, UPN and The WB's respective owners, with the latter owning most of The WB) to discuss the prospect of merging the networks together. Both sides reached an agreement on the division of affiliates, but Chris-Craft expressed extreme skepticism and declined to proceed with the merger. A merger would ultimately come in 2006 with the creation of The CW.

UPN launched on January 16, 1995, initially carrying programming only on Monday and Tuesday nights from 8:00 to 10:00 p.m. Eastern and Pacific Time. The first telecast, the two-hour pilot episode of Star Trek: Voyager, was an auspicious start, with 21.3 million viewers; however, Voyager would neither achieve such viewership levels again, nor would any of the series premiering on UPN's second night of broadcasting survive the season. In contrast, The WB debuted one week earlier, on January 11, with four series – only one of which, Muscle, would not survive its first season. The first comedy series to premiere on UPN were Platypus Man, starring Richard Jeni, and Pig Sty, with both shows airing Monday nights in the 9:00 p.m. hour; both received mixed reviews. Neither lasted long.

Other early UPN programs included the action series Nowhere Man, starring Bruce Greenwood and Marker, starring Richard Grieco; the comic western Legend starring Richard Dean Anderson; the sci-fi themed action series, The Sentinel; and Moesha, a sitcom starring R&B musician Brandy Norwood. Of the network's early offerings, only Star Trek: Voyager, Moesha and The Sentinel would last longer than one season. As a result of the lack of viewership, UPN operated on a loss and had lost $800 million by 2000.

Within nearly two years of the network's launch, on December 8, 1996, Paramount/Viacom purchased a 50% stake in UPN from Chris-Craft for approximately $160 million. Like Fox had done nine years earlier, UPN started with a few nights of programming each week, with additional nights of primetime shows gradually being added over the course of several seasons. Because of this, UPN's affiliates were basically independent stations for all intents and purposes during the network's early years, with these stations airing either syndicated programs or movies during primetime on nights when the network did not provide programming. The first expansion of its primetime lineup came with the addition of programming on Wednesday nights on March 6, 1996 (during the second half of the 1995–96 season); that expansion also saw UPN assume the broadcast rights to the Blockbuster Entertainment Awards, which aired its inaugural broadcast on CBS the year before.

UPN ordered 36 sci-fi films to air as part of its weekly movie presentations beginning in 1998; the films were supplied by four production companies, with most of the titles coming from Paramount. Some titles would be shown on Showtime first, which allowed the premium cable channel to cooperate in advertising the movies.

UPN completed its prime time expansion in the 1998–99 season, with Thursdays and Fridays as the last nights of programming to be added to the network's evening slate. That season saw the debut of The Secret Diary of Desmond Pfeiffer, a sitcom set during the Civil War that centered on a black English nobleman who becomes the valet to Abraham Lincoln; even before its premiere, the series was riddled by controversy and protests from several African American activist groups (including the Los Angeles chapter of the NAACP, who picketed outside Paramount Studios one week before the originally scheduled pilot episode) and some advertisers for its perceived lighthearted take on American slavery in the 19th century. Despite the publicity Desmond received from the controversial approach it applied to its topic, the series suffered from low ratings (with the first episode on October 5, 1998, placing 116th out of 125 programs aired that week on network television) and was canceled after four episodes.

=== 1999–2005: Viacom era and decline ===
Proposed logo for the scrapped Paramount Network.

Six months before Viacom announced its $36 billion merger with (the original) CBS Corporation, in March 1999, Viacom applied a contractual clause that would – within a 45-day grace period – force Chris-Craft to either buy Viacom out of UPN, or have Chris-Craft sell its ownership stake in UPN to Viacom. Three days later on February 8, Chris-Craft subsequently filed a lawsuit against Viacom in the New York Supreme Court to block Viacom's merger with CBS, claiming that a pact signed between the two partners in 1997 had prevented either from owning "any interest, financial or otherwise" in "any competing network", including CBS, for a four-year period through January 2001. On March 17, New York Supreme Court judge Herman Cahn ruled against Chris-Craft's move for a permanent injunction to curtail the Viacom-CBS merger and the enforcement of Viacom's ultimatum.

Unable to find a suitable partner, on March 20, Chris-Craft allowed Viacom to buy out its 50% stake for $5 million, giving Viacom full control of UPN. This gave UPN the rare distinction of being one of the only broadcast networks to not have had owned-and-operated stations (O&O) in the three largest media markets, New York City, Los Angeles, and Chicago (with The WB – the only network that never have had an O&O – being the only other, as minority owner Tribune Broadcasting owned most of its charter affiliates including those in all three markets, while majority owner Time Warner only owned WTBS-TV, an independent station that originated then-superstation TBS). With Viacom taking full ownership control of UPN, KCOP-TV and WWOR-TV lost their statuses as O&Os and automatically became affiliates of UPN, with UPN's de facto owned-and-operated flagship stations becoming Philadelphia outlet WPSG (now an independent station) and San Francisco outlet KBHK-TV (now KPYX, also an independent). In addition, neither Chris-Craft or Viacom had ever held ownership of Chicago affiliate WPWR-TV, which had been the largest UPN station that was not owned-and-operated by UPN before the Viacom buyout.

Shortly afterward, Viacom shortened UPN's official name from the "United Paramount Network" to the three-letter initialism, "UPN". Viacom also proposed a rebranding of UPN into the "Paramount Network", using a prototype logo based on Paramount's mountain logo, which served as the basis for the "P" triangle in UPN's original logo that was used until September 2002. This idea was abandoned after many affiliates protested, citing that the rebranding might confuse viewers and result in ratings declines, alongside the costs of rebranding their stations with a new image and new network (and possible call sign changes). Several years later, cable television network Spike (part of Viacom) rebranded as Paramount Network.

Viacom's purchase of CBS a few months before (which resulted in the merger of that network's owned-and-operated stations into Viacom's Paramount Stations Group unit), created duopolies between CBS and UPN stations in Philadelphia (KYW-TV and WPSG), Boston (WBZ-TV and WSBK-TV), Miami (WFOR-TV and WBFS-TV), Dallas–Fort Worth (KTVT and KTXA), Detroit (WWJ-TV and WKBD-TV), and Pittsburgh (KDKA-TV and WNPA). Viacom's purchase of CBS was said to be the "death knell" for the Federal Communications Commission's longtime ban on television station duopolies. Further transactions added San Francisco (KPIX-TV and KBHK-TV, the latter of which was traded to Viacom/CBS by Fox Television Stations) and Sacramento (KOVR and KMAX-TV, the former of which was sold to Viacom/CBS by the Sinclair Broadcast Group) to the mix.

At the time of UPN's launch, the network's de jure flagship stations were Chris-Craft-owned WWOR-TV in Secaucus, New Jersey (which serves the New York City market) and KCOP-TV in Los Angeles (which serves the Los Angeles market). Even after Chris-Craft sold its share in the network to Viacom, WWOR and KCOP were still commonly regarded as the de jure flagship stations of the network since it had long been common practice for this status to be associated with a network's station in the East Coast and West Coast. For this reason, some doubt was cast on UPN's future after Fox Television Stations bought most of Chris-Craft's television stations for $5.5 billion on August 12, 2000, which included several UPN affiliates (including WWOR and KCOP). Fox later bought the third-largest UPN affiliate, Chicago's WPWR-TV, through a separate deal with Newsweb Corporation for $450 million in June 2002. Despite the uncertainty of the network's future following the Fox purchases, UPN reached four-year affiliation agreements with Fox Television Stations' nine UPN affiliates on September 24, 2003.

In 2001, UPN entered into a public bidding war to acquire two series from The WB – Buffy the Vampire Slayer and Roswell – from producing studio 20th Century Fox Television. UPN eventually outbid The WB for the shows and aired them together on Tuesday nights until Roswell ended its run in 2002; Buffy ended its run the following year. In January 2002, Viacom President and COO, Mel Karmazin restructured UPN, resulting in UPN being taken out of the ownership of Paramount Television, and being placed under the oversight of CBS Television, with CBS President Leslie Moonves being given responsibility for UPN. Under CBS, new shows began to breathe life into UPN starting in Fall 2003 with America's Next Top Model and sitcom All of Us (which was produced by Will and Jada Pinkett Smith), followed up by the Fall 2004 premiere of the mystery series Veronica Mars and the Fall 2005 premiere of the sitcom Everybody Hates Chris, produced and narrated by Chris Rock.

=== 2005–2006: CBS Corporation era and network closure ===
On June 14, 2005, Viacom announced that it would be split into two companies due to declining performance of the company's stock; both the original Viacom – which was renamed CBS Corporation – and a new company that took the Viacom name would be controlled by the original Viacom's parent National Amusements (controlled by Sumner Redstone). UPN was kept by CBS Corporation, while the new Viacom took Paramount Pictures among other holdings each company acquired in the deal. The split took effect on January 1, 2006.

On January 24, 2006, UPN parent CBS Corporation and Time Warner, the majority owner of The WB, announced that they would shut down the two respective networks and launch a new broadcast network that would be operated as a joint venture between both companies, The CW, which incorporated UPN and The WB's higher-rated programs with newer series produced exclusively for The CW. The new network immediately signed 10-year affiliation agreements with 16 stations affiliated with The WB (out of 19 stations that were affiliated with the network) that were owned by that network's part-owner, the Tribune Company – including stations in the coveted markets of New York City, Los Angeles and Chicago – and 11 UPN stations that were owned by CBS Corporation. Fox Television Stations' nine UPN affiliates were passed over for affiliations as a result, and two days later, those stations removed all UPN branding and ceased promotion of the network's programs. One month later on February 22, Fox announced the formation of MyNetworkTV, a new network that would also launch in September 2006 that would use the company's soon-to-be former UPN affiliates as the nucleus. Over the next eight months, determinations were made as to which shows from the two networks would cross over to The CW, as well as which of UPN and The WB's affiliate stations would be selected to become affiliates of the new network. Programming-wise, six UPN shows – America's Next Top Model (which was the last surviving series from UPN that remained on The CW's schedule until it moved to VH1 in 2016), Veronica Mars, Everybody Hates Chris, Girlfriends, All of Us, and WWE SmackDown! – were chosen to move to The CW for its inaugural 2006–07 fall schedule.

With the exception of WWE SmackDown!, all of the programs that aired during the network's final three months were reruns. Unlike The WB, which closed its operations two days later with The Night of Favorites and Farewells (a special night of programming paying tribute to the network's most popular series), UPN closed with little to no fanfare on September 15, 2006, fading to black after that night's WWE SmackDown!. The Fox-owned UPN stations had disaffiliated from the network on August 31; as a result, UPN's last two weeks of programming did not air in 10 markets where Fox owned a UPN affiliate that was set to become an owned-and-operated station of MyNetworkTV, when that network launched on September 5, alongside other markets where the local UPN station affiliated with MyNetworkTV or terminated their UPN affiliation during the summer. Shortly after the network's closure, UPN's website was redirected to The CW's website, and then to CBS's website.

== Legacy ==
In November of 2026, Pluto TV launched a live TV channel titled "UPN Sitcoms" bringing the branding of the network back after 20 years. The channel's lineup includes UPN sitcoms such as The Parkers, Moesha, Malcolm & Eddie, among others.

== Programming ==
At the time of its shutdown, UPN ran only two hours of primetime network programming on Monday through Fridays from 8:00 to 10:00 p.m. ET (compared to the three primetime hours on Monday through Saturdays and four hours on Sundays offered by the Big Three networks, ABC, NBC and CBS). UPN never carried any weekend primetime programming throughout the network's run (though it did offer children's programming on weekend mornings until 2003, and a movie package to its affiliates on weekend afternoons until 2000, when the latter was replaced with a two-hour repeat block of UPN programs); as a result, affiliates held the responsibility of programming their Saturday and Sunday evening schedules with syndicated programs, sports, movies or network programs that were preempted from earlier in the week due to special programming, in the 8:00–10:00 p.m. (Eastern and Pacific Time) time period. This primetime scheduling allowed for many of the network's affiliates to air local newscasts during the 10:00–11:00 p.m. (Eastern and Pacific Time) time period.

Most of UPN's programming through the years was produced by Paramount Television or a Viacom-owned sister company (Viacom Productions, Big Ticket Television, Spelling Television or CBS Productions). UPN's first official program was Star Trek: Voyager, with the first comedy shows to debut being two short-lived series: the Richard Jeni starring vehicle Platypus Man and Pig Sty.

Other notable UPN programs during the network's existence included One on One,The Sentinel, Moesha, WWE SmackDown, America's Next Top Model, Girlfriends, the Moesha spin-off The Parkers, Veronica Mars, Everybody Hates Chris, Home Movies, and the animated adaptation of Dilbert. In Summer 2005, UPN aired R U the Girl, in which R&B group TLC (not with Left Eye, as she died in an automobile accident three years prior) searched for a woman to join them on a new song. The network also produced some special programs, including 2001's Iron Chef USA. Much of UPN's comedy programming between 1996 and 2006 (particularly those that aired as part of the network's Monday evening lineup) was largely aimed at African American audiences, with minor exceptions in shows such as Clueless, Realitycheck and Head Over Heels.

UPN occasionally acquired series canceled by the other broadcast networks, including former WB series Buffy the Vampire Slayer and Roswell (both of which moved to UPN in 2001, Buffy was picked up after The WB chose not to renew it due to issues with license fees while Roswell joined UPN after that same network also canceled the series), and former ABC series Clueless and The Hughleys. The first program that UPN acquired from another network was In the House, which moved to the network from NBC (which canceled the LL Cool J sitcom after its second season) in 1996. In its later years, as part of the network's desire to maintain its own identity with its own unique shows, UPN instituted a policy of "not picking up other networks' scraps", which was a strong argument when fan pressure was generated in 2004 for them to pick up Angel, the spin-off of Buffy the Vampire Slayer which had been dropped from The WB.

UPN aired only one regular sports event program: the much-hyped XFL in 2001, airing Sunday evening games as part of a package from co-creator and WWE founder Vince McMahon, which also included what was then WWF SmackDown!, and the only time the network carried programming officially outside of weeknights. UPN had planned to air a second season of the XFL in 2002, but it also demanded that SmackDown! be reduced by 30 minutes; McMahon did not agree to the change and the football league folded not long afterward.

=== News programming ===
Like Fox and The WB, UPN never aired national morning or evening newscasts; however, several of its affiliates and owned-and-operated stations did produce their own local news programs. Several UPN affiliates ran a local newscast in the 10:00–11:00 p.m. Eastern and Pacific (9:00–10:00 p.m. Central and Mountain Time) timeslot at some point during or throughout their affiliations with the network; there were also a few stations that produced a weekday morning newscast, although early evening newscasts were largely absent on most of these stations. The UPN affiliate body had fewer news-producing stations in comparison to stations aligned with the Big Three television networks (NBC, ABC and CBS) and considerably fewer than Fox and especially The WB. In several markets, the local UPN affiliate either outsourced news programming to an NBC, ABC or CBS station in the market (either due to insufficient funds or studio space for production of their own newscasts, or in later years after the FCC permitted duopolies in markets with at least eight unique station owners in 2000, the station being operated through a legal duopoly or management agreement with a major network affiliate); other affiliates opted to carry syndicated programming in the hour following UPN's primetime programming lineup. For example, one of the largest O&O UPN affiliates in the country, WPWR-TV, never aired news programming in its 11-year run. This is mainly due to Viacom and Chris Craft's non-affiliation with the Chicago station.

When the network launched in January 1995, UPN automatically added six affiliates with functioning news departments through Chris-Craft/United Television and Viacom's respective affiliation deals with the network; all of those stations started their news operations as either independent stations or during prior affiliations with other networks: WWOR-TV/Secaucus, New Jersey (New York City), KCOP-TV/Los Angeles, WKBD-TV/Detroit, KPTV/Portland, Oregon, KMSP-TV/Minneapolis and WTOG/Tampa, Florida. Two more stations would join them later on: KSTW/Seattle, also owned by Viacom at the time, after it affiliated with UPN in 1997 through the reversal of a 1995 affiliation switch with CBS affiliate KIRO-TV (which also kept its news department as a UPN affiliate), and KMAX-TV/Sacramento, which joined UPN after being acquired by Viacom in 1998 and began producing newscasts shortly after its 1995 affiliation with The WB. KSTW and WTOG's news departments were shut down in 1998 due to cost-cutting measures mandated by Viacom; newscasts would briefly return to KSTW via a news sharing agreement with KIRO-TV between 2003 and 2005.

Not all of UPN's news-producing stations were owned by the two companies that formed the nuclei of the network's affiliate group; WUAB/Cleveland, which started its news department in 1988, also continued its 10:00 p.m. newscast as a UPN affiliate (it would begin producing newscasts for sister station WOIO-TV in February 1995, after that station became a CBS affiliate; though WOIO eventually took over production of the newscast by 2002). Harrisburg affiliate WLYH-TV briefly continued its newscasts after switching to UPN from CBS in 1995, until WHP-TV began operating the station under a local marketing agreement that fall. WFTC/Minneapolis continued to produce a late evening newscast after Fox Television Stations (which acquired KMSP-TV through the Chris-Craft purchase, and converted it into a Fox O&O) acquired the station from Clear Channel Communications and switched the station to UPN – it was moved to 10:00 p.m. to avoid competing with KMSP's 9:00 p.m. newscast until the WFTC newscast was canceled in June 2006.

With the exception of KPTV and KMSP, both of which are now Fox stations, none of the former UPN affiliates that produced newscasts during their affiliation with the network continue to maintain an independent news department – despite license requirements imposed by the station's 1983 transfer of its license to Secaucus, New Jersey from New York City to cover New Jersey issues, WWOR-TV, which continued to produce news programming after coming under common ownership with Fox O&O WNYW, shut down its news department in July 2013 and replaced its lone 10:00 p.m. newscast with an outside produced program called Chasing New Jersey, a move that resulted in calls by state politicians for the FCC to revoke Fox's license to operate the station. KTTV took over production of sister station KCOP's newscasts in 2007, before discontinuing news programming on that station in 2013. KMAX's news department has since been merged with that of KOVR although it still produces a morning newscast separate from that station. WKBD shut down its news department (which was later shared with WWJ-TV) in December 2002, with its 10:00 p.m. newscast continuing to be produced by ABC affiliate WXYZ-TV until its eventual cancellation in 2005. CBS re-launched a news operation for both WWJ and WKBD under the umbrella title of CBS News Detroit in January 2023.

On September 11, 2001, UPN preempted its scheduled programming and simulcasted news coverage from CBS, with a UPN logo in the top right corner of the screen. UPN stations owned by Fox chose to air coverage from Fox News instead, while WWOR continued its local coverage.

=== Children's programming ===
When the network launched in January 1995, UPN introduced a weekend morning cartoon block called UPN Kids (later called "The UPN Kids Action Zone" during the 1998–99 season). Prior to the commencement of broadcast, UPN signed a content deal with Saban Entertainment, who produced the animated shows Bureau of Alien Detectors, The Mouse and the Monster and Space Strikers for UPN Kids during the 1995–96 and 1996–97 television seasons. Space Strikers was wholly owned by Saban Entertainment, although the ownership for Bureau of Alien Detectors and The Mouse and the Monster was jointly split between Saban and UPN. In late 1997, UPN added two teen-oriented series by Saban to the lineup; Sweet Valley High (based on the young adult book series by Francine Pascal) and Breaker High (which co-starred a then-unknown Ryan Gosling). Both shows filled the weekday morning block for the 1997–98 season, while they were also included alongside the animated series on Sunday mornings. Sweet Valley High had previously aired in first-run syndication between 1994 and mid-1997, before moving to UPN Kids. Unlike other networks, UPN gave its affiliates the option of running its weekend children's program block on either Saturdays or Sundays. In January 1998, the network entered into a deal with Saban Entertainment to program the Sunday morning block with Fox Kids programs which had recently ended, such as X-Men and Spider-Man.

In the mid to late 1990s, local affiliates of UPN were among some of the first stations in the United States to air dubbed anime such as Dragon Ball, Dragon Ball Z, Sailor Moon and Pokémon. At the time, the dubs of these anime were airing in first-run syndication (also often appearing on Fox and WB affiliates), with Pokémon later moving from syndication to Kids' WB in 1999, and the former moving to Cartoon Network in 1998. The syndicated anime dubs were never officially part of the national UPN Kids block.

In 1998, there were rumors that UPN then entered into discussions with then-corporate sister Nickelodeon (both networks were owned by Viacom) to produce a new block.

In 1999, UPN contracted the rights to the network's children's programming lineup to The Walt Disney Company; as a result, the teen-oriented and animated series were replaced with a new block called Disney's One Too, which debuted on September 6, 1999, and featured select programs seen on ABC's Disney's One Saturday Morning lineup (such as Recess and Sabrina: The Animated Series). Many UPN affiliates at the network's launch were already airing The Disney Afternoon, a block supplied by Disney-owned syndication distributor Buena Vista Television; however, that block would be discontinued in August 1997. The addition of Disney's One Too expanded UPN's children's program block back to two hours, running on Sunday mornings and weekday afternoons. In September 2002, Digimon: Digital Monsters moved to UPN from Fox Kids, due to Disney's acquisition of Fox's children's program inventory as well as the Fox Family Channel, which was renamed ABC Family (now Freeform) the past year. At the same time, the "One Too" branding was dropped from on-air usage due to the rebranding of ABC's Saturday morning lineup from One Saturday Morning to ABC Kids (although the block was unofficially referred to as Disney's Animation Weekdays outside the network). UPN subsequently chose not to renew its contract with Disney, with the network dropping all children's programming after August 31, 2003. This left UPN as one of only two major broadcast networks that did not air a children's programming block, the other being Pax TV, which discontinued its Pax Kids lineup in 2000, before returning children's programming as Ion Television through the 2006 launch of Qubo (as a 24/7 network, it was pulled off the air in 2021). Incidentally, UPN's successor The CW carried over the Kids' WB Saturday morning lineup from fellow predecessor The WB, resulting in UPN affiliates that joined The CW in September 2006 carrying network-supplied children's programming for the first time since the One Too block ended.

Some Fox stations that declined to carry 4Kids TV passed on that block to an affiliate of UPN or The WB, or an independent station, in order for the Fox affiliate to air general entertainment programming or local newscasts on Saturday mornings (for example, WFLD in Chicago moved the 4Kids TV schedule to co-owned then-UPN affiliate WPWR-TV, while WFLD aired infomercials).

=== Television films ===
During the late 1990s, UPN produced a number of television films under the umbrella brand Blockbuster Shockwave Cinema, in conjunction with sponsor (and then-sister company) Blockbuster Video, almost all of which were sci-fi films.

From UPN's inception until 2000, the network also offered a hosted movie series called the UPN Movie Trailer to its stations. The weekend block featured mostly older theatrically released action and comedy films, often those from the Paramount film library. The Movie Trailer block was discontinued in 2000 to give stations that opted for them room for a two-hour block of select UPN series that aired in primetime during the past week. There were also three Paramount-branded blocks that aired on Viacom's UPN owned-and-operated stations between 1995 and 2000: the Paramount Teleplex as the main brand for movies at any given timeslot, the Paramount Prime Movie for primetime features, and the Paramount Late Movie for films airing in late night timeslots. From 2002 to 2006, UPN offered a movie block (airing on Saturdays or Sundays depending on the affiliates) called Hot Weekend Movie, which carried movies (theatrical, made-for-TV and direct-to-video) from the Metro-Goldwyn-Mayer (MGM) library.

== Affiliates ==
UPN had approximately 143 full-power owned-and-operated or primary affiliate stations in the United States, and another 65 stations aired some UPN programming as secondary affiliates. Although it was considered a major network by Nielsen for ratings purposes, UPN was not available in every American television market. In some areas, UPN programming was shown off-pattern by affiliates of other networks (airing immediately after programming from their primary network on some Fox and WB stations, or during overnight timeslots on major network affiliates) or by otherwise independent stations, such as in the case of KIKU-TV in Honolulu, Hawaii. Some affiliates were also known to extensively preempt network programming in order to broadcast local sporting events.

By 2003, UPN had an estimated audience reach of 85.98% of all U.S. households (equivalent to 91,689,290 households with at least one television set). In contrast, The WB was viewable in 91.66% of all U.S. television homes. This is mainly because UPN did not have wide distribution in areas ranked below the top 100 Nielsen-designated media markets, whereas The WB operated The WB 100+ Station Group – a cable-only station group that was launched by the network in September 1998 – to provide broad coverage to those markets (from January 1995 to October 1999, The WB's programming was carried over the superstation feed of the network's Chicago affiliate WGN-TV through a programming agreement with its owner Tribune Broadcasting). Despite the fact that UPN would not be able to have extensive small-market coverage at launch due to a lack of commercial television stations in those areas, Paramount Television denied Advance Entertainment Corporation permission from distributing the network's programming over the WWOR EMI Service, the superstation feed of New York City affiliate WWOR-TV, preventing the network from reaching markets without an exclusive or secondary UPN affiliate. The network proposed launching a cable-originated service to increase its distribution to markets without an over-the-air affiliate in July 1998; however, the service, which was to have been named UPN Plus, ultimately never launched. UPN did have one cable-only affiliate in its station form, WNFM-TV in Fort Myers, Florida, which joined the network in 1998.

In markets where Viacom had a CBS/UPN duopoly after its 2000 merger with CBS, the UPN station was used to air CBS network programs if local sporting events or extended breaking news coverage would air on the CBS station, sometimes resulting in UPN programs being pre-empted outright, as the CBS-owned outlets were usually the senior partner in the duopolies (an exception being Detroit, where WKBD-TV is considered the senior partner to WWJ-TV due to WKBD being longer-established). One such event occurred on September 26, 2004, when Hurricane Jeanne forced a scheduled NFL game between the Pittsburgh Steelers and Miami Dolphins in Miami to be postponed from its scheduled start time of 1:00 p.m. to 8:30 p.m. ET; the game aired locally on KDKA-TV and WFOR-TV while their respective UPN sister stations, WNPA-TV and WBFS-TV, aired CBS's regular Sunday night programming instead.

These factors led to the network struggling in the ratings over much of UPN's existence, with its later Star Trek franchise, Star Trek: Enterprise, perhaps suffering the most and ultimately being canceled by the network in a controversial decision in February 2005. The most consistent ratings performer for the network was WWE SmackDown. During the 2004–2005 season, the network was getting consistently better ratings than The WB, much of this thanks to its carriage of the WWE.

=== Station standardization ===
When the network launched, UPN began having most of its stations branded using a combination of "UPN" or "Paramount" (the latter having been used only by the network's Viacom-owned stations, some of whom adopted the "Paramount" branding prior to UPN's launch), and the affiliated station's channel number. By the late 1990s, affiliates were simply branded under the "UPN (channel number or city)" scheme (for example, Chicago affiliate WPWR-TV called itself "UPN Chicago" and New York City O&O-turned-affiliate WWOR-TV was referred to as "UPN 9", until The CW's launch was announced in January 2006).

However, most of the UPN owned-and-operated stations under Viacom/CBS Corporation branded themselves by the network/city conventions (for example, KBHK-TV/San Francisco was branded as "UPN Bay Area", WKBD/Detroit was branded as "UPN Detroit", WUPA was branded as "UPN Atlanta" and WUPL/New Orleans was branded as "UPN New Orleans"). That type of branding did not always apply though, as for example, WSBK-TV/Boston was branded "UPN 38" and KMAX-TV/Sacramento was branded "UPN 31". WNPA/Pittsburgh originally branded itself as "UPN 19", but rebranded itself as "UPN Pittsburgh" soon after the network introduced its second and final logo in September 2002, making it one of the few that had carried both standardization styles. Many UPN-affiliated stations followed the same branding scheme (for example, KFVE/Honolulu used the brand "UPN Hawaii").

This would be a continuation of the trend of networks using such naming schemes, which originated at Fox (and even earlier by the Canadian CBC), and was also predominately used at CBS (which has most of its owned-and-operated stations, with a few exceptions, brand using a combination of the network's name and over-the-air channel number) and The WB (with the exception of its Tribune Broadcasting-owned affiliates in Los Angeles and Chicago, and certain other stations); NBC and ABC also use similar branding schemes, but not to the same broad level outside their O&Os. While the "Big Three" networks do not require their affiliates to have such naming schemes (though some affiliates choose to adopt it anyway) and only on the network's O&Os is the style required, UPN mandated it on all stations – though in one case, Milwaukee affiliate WCGV branded as "Channel 24" from 1998 to 2001, excluding UPN imagery from its station branding (WCGV, which previously branded as "UPN 24", had disaffiliated from the network for eight months in 1998 due to a compensation dispute; it received a rare waiver from the network to air a marathon of the last half of season four of Star Trek: Voyager which it had not aired in August 1998, before the fifth season's premiere in September.).

One Chris-Craft/United Television-owned station, KMSP-TV in Minneapolis–Saint Paul, only branded as "UPN 9" for its entertainment and network programming. Due to the station's circumstances of holding full cable carriage across the state of Minnesota and into The Dakotas as a superstation, local management preferred to retain their pre-UPN "Minnesota 9" branding in some manner, as most of the UPN schedule was of low appeal to the station's rural viewers, and it was building a successful and competitive news department that did not depend on the success or failure of UPN. KMSP's news division success despite UPN affiliation was one of the pushes for Fox Television Stations to acquire United Television overall, then convert KMSP-TV to a Fox owned-and-operated station in Fall 2002. The UPN affiliation thus moved to new sister station WFTC, which followed all UPN branding guidelines until Fox pulled their support for the network in January 2006.

== See also ==
- List of United States over-the-air television networks
- 2006 United States broadcast TV realignment
