= Tony Martinez (broadcaster) =

Tony Martinez is an American television and radio broadcaster known for his time on Portland radio station KKRZ as "Officer Tony", and as the traffic reporter for the KPTV Fox 12 morning news program Good Day Oregon. He is one of that show's original members.

== Early career ==
Martinez graduated from college with a master's degree in social work. In 1984, he began his broadcasting career at Portland FM radio station KKRZ, also known as 'Z100'. He soon amassed a large following as "Officer Tony", one of the hosts of Z100's "Morning Zoo".

== Good Day Oregon ==
In 1996, Martinez joined KPTV channel 12 as a traffic reporter for the debuting early morning news program, Good Day Oregon. Martinez is the only original member appearing regularly on the show.

== Life ==
Martinez is an adjunct professor and teaches Latino popular culture at Portland State University.

== Awards ==
Martinez is a five-time recipient of the "Best Traffic Reporter" Award from The Associated Press.
