= Chris-Craft Industries =

Former American company

Chris-Craft Industries, Inc.
- Formerly: National Automotive Fibers, Inc.
- Type: Public
- Traded as: NYSE: CCN
- Industry: Manufacturing; Broadcasting
- Founded: 1928; 98 years ago
- Defunct: 2001; 25 years ago
- Fate: Sold to News Corporation
- Successor: News Corporation (2001–2013); 21st Century Fox (2013–2019); Fox Corporation (2019–present)
- Headquarters: New York, New York, USA
- Products: Boats, hospital laundry bags, carpet fibers, insulation, and chemical products
- Revenue: $467.1 million (1998)
- Divisions: Chris-Craft Boats; Roamer Steel Boats Division
- Subsidiaries: BHC Communications, Inc. (79.96%); Chris-Craft Industrial Products, Inc.

Chris-Craft Industries, Inc., formerly National Automotive Fibers, Inc., was a publicly held American corporation that was traded on the New York and Pacific Stock Exchanges. In 1962, the company adopted the name of one of its acquisitions, Chris-Craft Boats, which was founded in the late 19th century and became famous for mahogany-hulled powerboats in the 1920s through the 1950s. Chris-Craft Industries also went into broadcasting, owning television stations via its subsidiary BHC Communications and co-founding the UPN TV network.

== History ==
=== National Automotive Fibers ===
National Automotive Fibers (NAF) was formed in Detroit in 1928 as a manufacturer of upholstery, carpeting, interior trim and plastic products for the automobile companies Chrysler Motors, Ford Motors and Studebaker-Packard. While successful, the company was only a minor automotive supplier. In the 1940s, NAF purchased the Montrose Chemical Company of San Francisco, but it was still centered on the auto industry. In 1956, the company suffered a major loss of $1 million against sales of $46 million. Paul V. Shields, a senior partner of Shields & Company, a Wall Street investment firm, acquired the company as he saw that NAF was overdependent on the auto industry but had growth potential. Shields trimmed NAF's product line and diversified the company into oil and gas operations, television and radio broadcasting. With this diverse portfolio, the company was renamed the NAFI Corporation in 1959. This brought a record profit of $1 million against lowered sales with assets of $10 million. NAF and Bing Crosby teamed up to purchase a television station, KPTV in Portland, Oregon, for $4 million on September 1, 1959. A Bing Crosby–led group sold Los Angeles' KCOP-TV in 1960 to the corporation.

=== Chris-Craft Industries ===
Chris-Craft Boats was an independent company until it was acquired by Shields & Company's NAFI Corporation in 1960 and merged with NAFI. They renamed the merged company in 1962 as Chris-Craft Industries, Incorporated. In 1962, the company acquired the Old Crown Brewing Corporation, a brewery company based in Fort Wayne, Indiana. Old Crown was sold to its employees a short time later.

In 1964, Chris-Craft launched the all-fiberglass Chris-Craft Commander. This dramatic new design was unveiled at the New York City National Boat show, perched at the top of an escalator on a giant, castered cradle. This first Commander was a 38' express hardtop with a 13' beam. The line of Commanders soon grew to include sizes ranging from 19' to 60'—all "styled in fiberglass."

In 1968, Baldwin-Montrose Chemical Co., Inc., took a controlling interest in Chris-Craft and installed its chairman, Herbert J. Siegel, as Chris-Craft's chairman.

In 1977, Chris-Craft Industries formed BHC, Inc., to hold its two existing television stations, KCOP in Los Angeles and KPTV in Portland, Oregon, both placed within BHC's Chris-Craft Television, Inc., subsidiary. That same year, Chris-Craft purchased a share of 20th Century Fox. The company attempted in 1979 a hostile take over of 20th Century Fox but failed. In 1981, the 20th Century Fox share, then at 20 percent, was traded to Marvin Davis and Marc Rich for 19 percent of United Television.

Between the 1960s and 1980s, Chris-Craft lost market share as competitors with more innovative designs and less expensive manufacturing techniques, such as fiberglass hulls, came on the scene. Chris-Craft ended production of its last mahogany-hulled boat, the Constellation, in 1971.

Chris-Craft Industries sold its boat division to Murray Industries in 1981. Chris-Craft Industries retained the Chris-Craft trademark and licensed it to Murray.

After Chris-Craft sold its boat division, it focused solely on its broadcast division. In 1992, BHC acquired Pinelands, an MCA spin off company that owned WWOR-TV in the New York City area, that MCA was forced to spin off the station due to the acquisition of MCA by Japanese multinational conglomerate Matsushita Electric (now Panasonic), and which foreign companies are prohibited from owning more than 25 percent of a television station. In 1994, BHC and Paramount Television announced the formation of the fifth television network United Paramount Network (UPN). The network, targeted toward the young male demographic group, premiered in early 1995 and offered four hours of original prime-time programming per week. The following year original programming was increased to six hours per week. As part of the agreement, Chris-Craft owned 100 percent of UPN, with Paramount having the option to acquire an equal share through January 15, 1997. In 1997, Viacom acquired a 50 percent interest in UPN for $160 million.

In the late 1990s, BHC acquired two television stations, WHSW (now WUTB) in Baltimore, Maryland, and WRBW in Orlando, Florida, it resulted in the increase of BHC's number of television stations to ten.

In 1999, Viacom announced plans to merge with CBS Corporation. Because of a regulation upheld by the FCC years ago, prohibiting companies from owning two broadcast networks. Viacom's announcement raised questions regarding the future of Chris-Craft and Viacom's joint ownership of UPN. In Viacom and Chris-Craft's original agreement, two options for exiting the partnership had been determined—buying out the other partner or paying for what the partner had invested up to that date and providing funds for the future operation of UPN. Either option would cost Viacom substantial sums of money. Industry analysts agreed that Chris-Craft could emerge the winner and offered other possible scenarios: that Viacom might offer Chris-Craft some of its stations in exchange for severing the partnership or that Chris-Craft might sell Viacom's share to another company.

However after the Viacom-CBS merger was completed in 2000, a lawsuit was filed by BHC against the Viacom-CBS merger as BHC saw this as a breach of the UPN partnership. BHC lost the suit and sold its remaining ownership in UPN to Viacom for $5 million. Shortly thereafter, Chris-Craft announced that it was getting out of broadcasting after losing $500 million on UPN, the possibility of UPN shutting down or having their affiliation pulled. Many industry observers thought Viacom would end up getting the stations, but Viacom's bid lost out to News Corporation's Fox Television Stations, resulting in a sale which closed on July 31, 2001.

== See also ==
- BHC Communications § Former television stations – list of television stations owned by Chris-Craft's subsidiary
- Chris-Craft Corporation – a company that reunited the brand name with the boat manufacturing division.
