= Chris-Craft Commander =

Range of motorboats

Chris-Craft Commander is the name of a range of cruisers built by Chris-Craft Industries. Originally built of wood, the first fiberglass Commander was built in 1963 and debuted at the 1964 New York Boat Show. At the time, none of the large main line motor yacht builders (Matthews, Owens, C.P. Leeks (Pacemaker), etc.) were building in fiberglass. Hatteras Yachts, which had started as a partnership between two North Carolina furniture makers, and Pearson, generally noted for their fiberglass auxiliary sailboat cruisers, were the only companies making fiberglass boats over 30' in length.

"The 38 Commander Express cruiser was the pivotal boat in the development of fiberglass technology by Chris-Craft Industries. It was the first all-fiberglass cruiser made by Chris-Craft. Its production bridged the past to the future as it was the last design by "Mac" Mackerer who had worked for Chris-Craft as far back as 1925, also working with Fred Hudson, who styled the first 38 Commander. The 38’ Commander Express proved to be a success for Chris-Craft resulting in the production of subsequent sedan and sport fisherman models."

== "Weekend" Commanders ==
Weekend Commanders range 19 feet to 28 feet length and are primarily boats designed for weekend recreation. Some are runabouts reminiscent of the boating style Chris Craft helped form in the 1920s.

Others are more suited to small sport fishermen or entertaining guests on short cruises. The largest boats in this range also provide occasional overnight capabilities. The 19' and 23' Commanders designed by Jim Wynn and Walt Walters of offshore racing fame, feature deep-V hulls and are suited for moderately rough water. The 30' Commanders have hulls designed by C. Ray Hunt, and are sought after for offshore fishing due to their deep-V hulls and rough water handling characteristics. Several options and variations existed throughout the entire model line, such as the 27' Commander which was available in an open "Sportsman" configuration with single or twin V8 motors.

The models in the range are:

- 19' Super Sport
- 23'
- 27'
- 27' Sports Express
- 28' Sports Express
- 30' Sportsman
- 30' Tournament Fisherman

== "Mainstream" Commanders ==
Mainstream Commanders ranged from 31 to 38 feet, and owe their label Mainstream to the fact that they represent the largest number of Commanders built. They are all boats that will accommodate families for long cruises with overnight stays, or provide entertainment opportunities at sea or in port.

The models in the range are:

- 31 Sports Express
- 31' Commander
- 31' Sedan
- 33' 337 Commander
- 35' Commander
- 35' Salon
- 35' SportsCruiser
- 36' SportsCruiser
- 36' Tournament Fisherman
- 38' Commander
- 38' Sedan
- 38' Sport Fisherman

== "Large" Commanders ==
Large Commanders range from 41 to 47 feet. They typically feature double staterooms, dual heads and shower cabins. Some of the models were available with different interior layouts. These boats will accommodate family or friends for extended cruises and provide for ample entertainment opportunities.

The models in the range are:

- 41' Flush Deck/Yacht
- 42' Commander
- 42' Sports Cruiser
- 42' Tournament Fisherman
- 45' Commander Flush Deck
- 45' Tournament Fisherman
- 47' Commander
- 47' Commander YachtFish (aft cockpit)

== "Luxury" Commanders ==
The models in the range are:

- 55' Commander
- 60' Commander
