= Fox 51 =

Fox 51 may refer to one of the following television stations in the United States affiliated with the Fox Broadcasting Company:

- KFXK-TV in Tyler, Texas
- WOGX in Gainesville, Florida
