= Steven Romo =

American journalist (born 1988)

- Born: 1988 (age 37–38); Dallas, Texas, U.S.
- Occupations: Television journalist, writer
- Years active: 2009–present
- Notable credit: NBC News journalist HuffPost contributor
- Height: 6 ft (183 cm)
- Title: News anchor
- Spouse: Stephen Morgan (m. 2022)
- Website: stevenromo.com

Steven Romo (born 1988) is an American news anchor, correspondent and writer. Based in New York City since 2021, he is a correspondent for NBC News; he also works as a contributor for HuffPost.

== Early life ==
Romo was born in Dallas and raised in the suburb of Duncanville, Texas. His father was a big rig truck driver, and his mother worked intermittently at grocery stores. He has described his childhood as marred by neglect due to his mother's mental health. Romo has written about his family's squalid home and animal hoarding. He has also discussed his Latino heritage and Mexican American identity, as well as his struggles with poverty. Romo has credited his childhood love of television and books as giving him the tools he needed to escape his difficult start in life.

In a personal essay for HuffPost, Romo wrote about his coming out experience. He also revealed more details about his dysfunctional family and childhood, including that he "dropped out" of school in the eighth grade before scrambling to get into college, which he successfully did as he has stated elsewhere that he attended Texas A&M University.

== Career ==
Romo was named among Kelly Clarkson, Rachel Zegler, Mark Consuelos, Alex Wagner, Ice Spice and others in Variety's list of New York's power players in pop culture.

He was named Journalist of the Year by the NLGJA: The Association of LGBTQ Journalists in 2024 for his "exceptional abilities, integrity and distinctive work that brought honor to the profession."

Romo got his start in journalism while attending Texas A&M University, where he wrote for the student-run newspaper, The Battalion. In 2016, he joined KTRK-TV in Houston, Texas. He became an anchor for the station in 2018. Romo turned down a primary anchor role at KTRK in 2021 so he could move to New York City with his fiancé. A short time later, he announced that he would begin working freelance for NBC News. In the summer of 2022, NBC announced Romo would join full-time as the newest correspondent for the network based in New York City.

Romo spent five years with the Disney-owned ABC station in Houston before making the move to NBC. During that time, he appeared on ABC News national platforms discussing his reporting experiences, beginning with coverage of Hurricane Harvey and the storm's deadly aftermath. He also appeared on Good Morning America in 2019 alongside Michael Strahan and Sara Haines to support charities that fight poverty in the Houston area.

Romo began writing for HuffPost in 2019 in addition to his work as a news anchor.

Romo started his career working at television stations across Texas. Prior to moving to Houston in 2016, Romo worked as an evening anchor in Tulsa. While reporting in Oklahoma, he was nominated for two Emmy Awards for his work covering the 2015 Oklahoma State University homecoming parade crash.

He was interviewed for Dani Shapiro's Family Secrets podcast season three. The episode "Bug Dust" was released in 2020.

Romo's views on a variety of topics have appeared on Today, The Daily Mirror, The Hill, Cosmopolitan and more.

In March 2023, he appeared as a guest on Andy Cohen's radio lineup with John Hill, broadcast on SiriusXM.

== Personal life ==
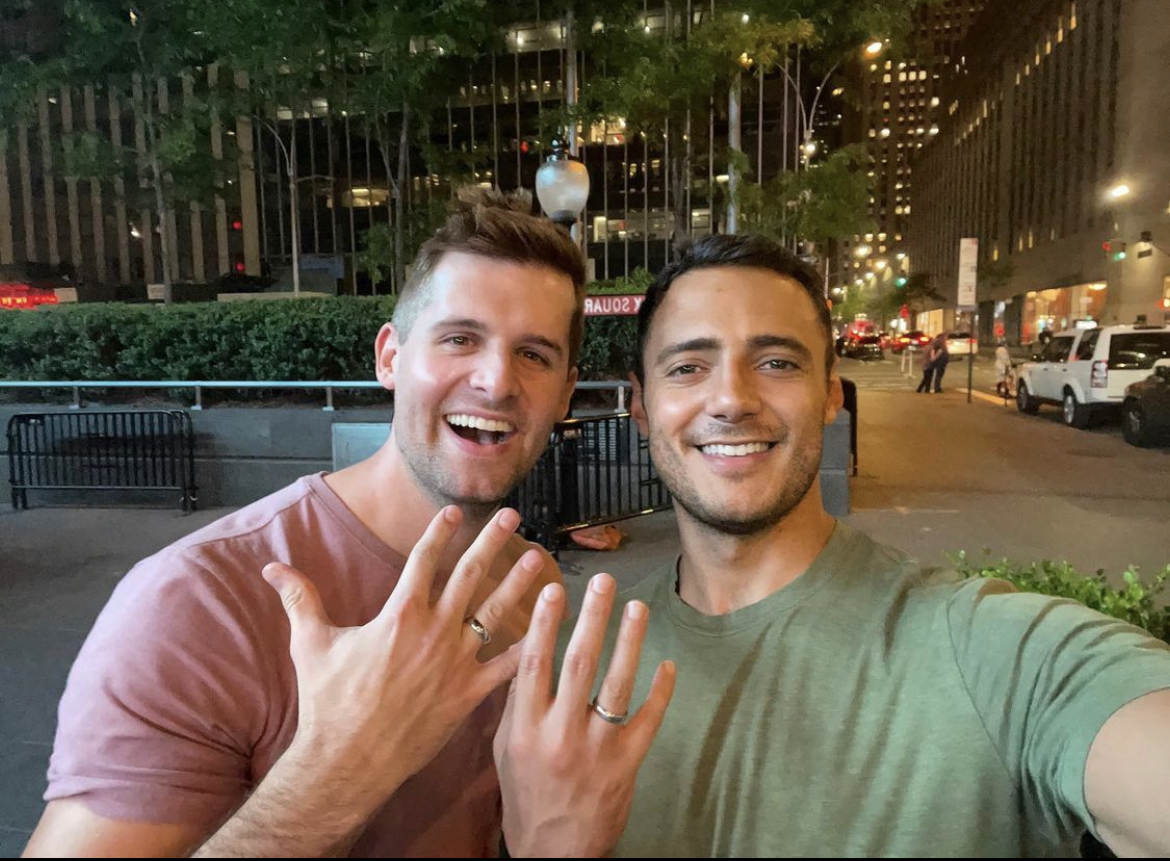
Romo and meteorologist Stephen Morgan announce their engagement.

Romo announced his engagement to Fox Weather meteorologist Stephen Morgan in July 2021. The pair reportedly met in Houston while covering Hurricane Harvey and began dating thereafter.

The couple married on October 8, 2022, in Dallas at a venue on White Rock Lake in front of 125 guests. Their wedding also garnered a great deal of media attention, appearing in The New York Times' Sunday Styles section, People and more.

In an essay for HuffPost, Romo wrote about his experiences coming out as gay, and how his feelings of isolation due to his upbringing made him surprised that he was able to find a "yelling-from-the-rooftops" type of love.

In a Today piece, Romo discussed his journey toward visibility saying, "Coming out freed me. I finally gave myself permission to meet more LGBTQ+ people, and I learned that queer joy is even more powerful than queer sorrow."

Romo is also a friend of fellow broadcast journalist Anderson Cooper, according to social media posts and reporting from The Today Show.

He has described himself as a mental and physical health advocate, stating in interviews his mother's death at 43 years old while he was in college sparked a desire to confront damaging habits early.

== See also ==
- LGBT culture in New York City
- List of LGBT people from New York City
- New Yorkers in journalism
