= WOFL =

Television station in Orlando, Florida

- Orlando, Florida; United States
- Channels: Digital: 33 (UHF); Virtual: 35
- Branding: Fox 35 Orlando; Fox 35 News

Programming
- Affiliations: 35.1: Fox; 35.2: Buzzr; 35.3: Fox Weather

Ownership
- Owner: Fox Television Stations, LLC
- Sister stations: WOGX, WRBW

History
- First air date: March 31, 1974 (Note: As WSWB-TV. The station left the air on September 30, 1976, and returned to the air as WOFL on October 15, 1979.)
- Former call signs: WSWB (1974–1976)
- Former channel numbers: Analog: 35 (UHF, 1974–2009); Digital: 22 (UHF, until 2020)
- Former affiliations: Independent (1974–1976, 1979–1986); Dark (1976–1979)
- Call sign meaning: Orlando, Florida

Technical information
- Licensing authority: FCC
- Facility ID: 41225
- ERP: 1,000 kW
- HAAT: 447 m (1,467 ft)
- Transmitter coordinates: 28°36′14″N 81°05′10″W

Links
- Public license information: Public file; LMS
- Website: fox35orlando.com

WOFL (channel 35) is a television station in Orlando, Florida, United States, serving as the market's Fox network outlet. It is owned and operated by the network's Fox Television Stations division alongside WRBW (channel 65), an independent station with MyNetworkTV. The two stations share studios on Skyline Drive in Lake Mary; WOFL's transmitter is located in Bithlo, Florida. WOFL's local news programming is also broadcast on co-owned WOGX, serving Ocala and Gainesville.

Channel 35 in Orlando went on the air as WSWB-TV on March 31, 1974. Built by Sun World Broadcasters, WSWB-TV was Orlando's first independent station. After facing 19 months of construction delays, it suffered from financial difficulties within months of launching. This culminated in the station's equipment being seized by federal marshals on September 30, 1976. Three years of legal wrangling over a buyer followed. Omega Communications, a company led by former Taft Broadcasting executive Bud Rogers, beat out Ted Turner and the Christian Broadcasting Network and put channel 35 back on the air October 15, 1979, as WOFL. Under Omega and Meredith Corporation, which became its full owner in 1983, the station prospered as the highest-rated and, for some years, the only full-market independent station in rapidly growing Central Florida.

WOFL began airing local newscasts in March 1998, first at 10 p.m. before expanding to mornings. After Meredith traded WOFL to Fox Television Stations in 2002, the news department grew aggressively over the course of the 2000s, with additional hours of morning, early evening, and late evening newscasts.

== WSWB-TV ==
Interest in constructing a commercial ultra high frequency (UHF) television station in Orlando stretched as far back as 1965, when the Connecticut-based Omicron Television Corporation applied for channel 35. The construction permit was awarded in 1966, but it was vacant by 1970, when Sun World Broadcasters Inc. applied for channel 35. It was headed by Orlando resident Earl Boyles, who had run television stations in multiple states, and featured stockholders from the Orlando area as well as the state of North Carolina. The Federal Communications Commission (FCC) approved the construction permit to Sun World on March 21, 1971, and the call sign WSWB-TV two months later.

Sun World's plans to build the station were delayed 19 months. In April 1972, the company ran newspaper ads promising the station would debut that August. Construction activities were snarled by a national shortage of building supplies, which delayed work on the studios on Colonial Drive east of Orlando, and difficulties with the land conditions at the tower site in Bithlo, which a station official called "mucky" and requiring compacted sand to withstand the weight of a 1,500-foot (460 m) tower. Planned airdates of March, August, and November 1973 were all missed.

WSWB-TV began broadcasting on March 31, 1974. It represented an investment of $3.6 million and was a general-entertainment independent station with movies, sports, reruns, children's shows, and pre-empted network programming. It also featured a local 10:30 p.m. newscast. The 10:30 news used national and international footage from Television News Inc.; it lasted six months before being scrapped. At the outset, WSWB-TV invested heavily in locally produced programs, which included a midday talk show, Florida Lifestyle; two children's shows, Romper Room and Uncle Hubie's Children's Playhouse; a teen dance hour, Blue Christie's Rock and Roll Sundance; and the country music program The Gene Thomley Show.

Within months of signing on the air, WSWB-TV began showing signs of financial strain. In November 1974, RCA, a major equipment supplier to the startup station, sued for $2.28 million they alleged they were owed on video tape equipment, which they sought to repossess. Sun World countersued, alleging that RCA had breached its contract and claiming loss of advertising sales and reputation after the RCA suit. The station spent 1975 fighting for its viability. In June, Sun World agreed to sell WSWB-TV to the Martin International Corporation, though the transaction was not submitted for FCC approval until December 16. Meanwhile, on July 2, leasing company Continental Credit Corporation moved to seize $200,000 of mostly office furnishings from the studios, though the station continued to broadcast. Continental pushed for the appointment of a receiver for WSWB-TV, to which Martin objected because it believed such a move would jeopardize the station's broadcast license; as a compromise, the parent of Sun World, not Sun World itself, was put into receivership. Following the appointment, WSWB-TV canceled its local programs, let go of their hosts, and focused on its early evening lineup and movies. In December 1975, Winter Park Federal Savings and Loan and Continental Credit—the two mortgageholders on WSWB-TV properties—moved to auction the station's facilities to satisfy creditors, with the savings and loan winning its own mortgages at auction.

=== Three years off the air ===
On October 3, 1975, a federal judge ordered Sun World Broadcasters to turn over RCA's equipment to the company within 28 days. RCA later gave the station until September 28, 1976, to pay what it was owed. The action went unheralded until September 30, 1976, when U.S. Marshals arrived at the station's studios with a court order and a group of movers and engineers to remove the RCA equipment from the building. At 2:39 p.m., in the middle of The Mickey Mouse Club and with no advance warning to viewers, channel 35 left the air. Viewers flooded the station's switchboard with calls after the shutdown and as they tuned in for programs throughout the day, asking what had happened. Even the youngest viewers, who watched channel 35's cartoons and children's programs, tried to help, sending letters of encouragement and in one case money from their allowances.

Station officials expressed hope that a new owner could be identified and the station put back on the air. By mid-October, one of these potential buyers had bought the transmitter site: Ted Turner, who owned WTCG in Atlanta and WRET in Charlotte, North Carolina. Turner successfully pushed for the appointment of a receiver for Sun World, an action seen as delaying any return to air until the station was sold. The still-pending Martin International application was dismissed, and instead Sun World tried to sell the station to the Christian Broadcasting Network (CBN). Turner rejected CBN's offer for the station's real estate; Sun World challenged Turner's actions with the FCC, believing he was attempting to purchase the bankrupt station in the same manner he bought WRET in 1970. A receiver was formally appointed to protect the broadcast license, which was about to expire, and collate the company's assets and claims. The receiver tentatively agreed to sell the station to Turner, but his decision was subject to review by circuit court judge Frederick T. Pfeiffer.

Even though Turner already owned the transmitter site, the stockholders of Sun World disagreed with the receiver's preferred bidder over the structure of the contract. The Turner bid for $1.1 million called for half to be paid at closing and the other half over 10 years, but Turner had the option to prepay the latter at a 10 percent discount. They preferred a different bid for channel 35: the Omega group, a five-man consortium headed by Lawrence H. "Bud" Rogers, a retired Taft Broadcasting executive. Pfeiffer bucked the receiver and his own "first impression" favoring Turner and approved the sale of WSWB-TV to Omega for $1.2 million on April 12, 1977. Turner refused to back down and promised to appeal Pfeiffer's decision.

In the meantime, the studio building was auctioned. Winter Park Federal Savings and Loan and Turner had each bid, but the winner was another Orlando television station: public station WMFE-TV (channel 24), which had outgrown its existing facilities at the Mid-Florida Technical Institute and sought larger quarters in preparation to start an FM radio station. Turner filed his appeal, in the Florida Fourth District Court of Appeal in West Palm Beach; industry experts noted that what was at stake was the potential to run the only independent station in the rapidly growing Orlando market at a time when independent outlets were on an upturn. The appeals court case, further delayed by the resignation of a judge, ended in June 1978 with a ruling upholding Pfeiffer's April 1977 decision favoring Omega. The ruling was unsuccessfully appealed to the Florida Supreme Court.

== WOFL: Omega and Meredith ownership ==
=== Orlando's leading independent ===
On June 15, 1979, the FCC approved the transfer of the channel 35 license to Omega Communications, Inc. The station changed its call sign from WSWB-TV to WOFL on August 30, and the new owners set to work converting a former bank on Orange Blossom Trail into channel 35's new studios. Lauding WSWB-TV's general manager in 1976, Ray Balsom, for keeping the station afloat and even profitable in the months before it closed, Rogers tapped him to be WOFL's first general manager. WOFL launched on October 15, 1979, again utilizing a typical independent station format. The Meredith Corporation of Des Moines, Iowa, had invested in Omega Communications before WOFL went on air and held a 40-percent stake as well as a buyout option that it could trigger before 1984. It acquired the remainder of Omega in a 1983 transaction valuing the station at $27.6 million—a substantial return on the $1.2 million Omega had paid to buy the facility out of receivership. In the years after its relaunch, WOFL was the primary independent station in its market, with a market share of 8 to 9 percent. In 1982, Central Florida gained its second independent, WMOD (channel 43). Licensed to Melbourne, it lacked the corporate and programming resources and technical facility of WOFL and only had a market share of 3 percent by late 1984. Though stations across Central Florida attempted to compete, only WOFL had a good signal and cable coverage in Orlando, while two other channels allotted to Orlando (27 and 65) were in the hearing phase. In October 1986, WOFL became the Orlando-market affiliate of the new Fox network; it considered leaving in 1988, when several Fox affiliates dropped the network over its weak Saturday night lineup.

With its prosperity, the station expanded its facilities and attempted to expand its coverage. In 1986, Meredith completed new studios for the station along Interstate 4 in the Orlando suburb of Lake Mary, consisting of a $5 million building and $1.5 million in new equipment. The larger studio facility was used not only by WOFL but other production endeavors and even other divisions of Meredith. Parts of the 1988 film Ernest Saves Christmas were filmed at channel 35, and the Meredith-owned magazine Golf for Women occupied space that had been designated for a future newsroom.

As early as 1983, a locally owned low-power TV station in Crystal River, W49AI, was on air, rebroadcasting WOFL to a small area in Citrus County. Meredith filed in 1986 to build channel 64, licensed to Inverness, as a rebroadcaster of WOFL under the proposed call sign WIFL. The application was contested by Ocala–based independent station WBSP-TV (channel 51, later WOGX) and the FCC's own Mass Media Bureau, which noted that multiple other applicants for the channel had sought full-service stations, not repeaters. In 1989, WOGX appealed the FCC's award of a construction permit to the full commission.

WOGX was acquired by Meredith from Wabash Valley Broadcasting in 1995. When the sale took effect on January 1, 1996, WOFL's general manager assumed responsibility for WOGX, and the company set up data links between the two stations. Master control for WOGX moved to Lake Mary; of 30 jobs in Ocala, eight to nine were eliminated, and another 11 were transferred to Lake Mary. The combination added 94,000 Gainesville-area homes to WOFL's viewing area.

On January 24, 1997, Meredith announced its acquisition of First Media Television, which owned three stations—including Orlando's CBS affiliate, WCPX-TV (channel 6). At the time, duopolies were not allowed; Meredith had to select a station to keep. Employees at both stations suggested that WOFL would be chosen for sale, but Meredith kept WOFL and instead traded WCPX to Post-Newsweek Stations.

== Fox ownership ==
As early as October 2001, speculation emerged of a potential trade between Meredith and the Fox Television Stations Group that would create duopolies in Orlando and Portland, Oregon. Fox had acquired WRBW (channel 65), then Orlando's UPN affiliate, as part of its purchase of the Chris-Craft Industries stations in July 2001; in Portland, Meredith owned Fox affiliate KPDX, and Fox had acquired KPTV from Chris-Craft. The deal, agreed in March 2002 and completed three months later, saw WOFL and WOGX go to Fox while KPTV went to Meredith.

== News operation ==
WOFL general manager Norris Reichel announced in July 1996 that the station planned to debut a "fast-paced" 10 p.m. local newscast seven nights a week in early 1997. The only local station airing news at 10 was WKCF (channel 18), which offered a WCPX-produced newscast. The plans were put on hold temporarily while Meredith decided which of WCPX or WOFL to divest, but when it decided to keep channel 35, the news department plans were cleared to launch. The 10 p.m. news debuted as a half-hour broadcast on March 1, 1998, targeting a younger audience in line with Fox network programming; the main news anchors were in their early thirties, and the station had a fleet of Ford Mustangs as news vehicles. The original plans also included a 6 p.m. newscast for WOGX focusing on Ocala and Gainesville news, but this failed to meet ratings and demographic targets and was discontinued after nine months. The prime time news expanded to a full hour in September 1999.

In 2000, WOFL expanded its news operation to mornings with the launch of Good Day Orlando, originally a two-hour program running from 7 to 9 a.m. against the national network morning newscasts. The news department was expanded by 13 employees and the station's video production unit closed to make way for the new newscast. After the Fox acquisition, this program expanded to three hours from 6 to 9 a.m. in September 2002 and was relaunched as the more news-oriented Fox 35 Morning News. It had grown again to four hours, from 5 to 9 a.m., by 2005.

Beginning in 2006, WOFL expanded its news operation outside of mornings and late night news. A 5 p.m. newscast debuted on March 6, 2006, originally with a format inspired by morning newscasts; encouraged by a strong early performance among viewers aged 25–54, the station expanded it to weekends five months later, bringing the total news output to 34 hours weekly. An expansion to 6 p.m. followed in 2007, as did a newscast at 11 p.m. in 2008.

In 2009, WOFL launched Good Day, a morning news and features program. It combined with the existing Fox 35 Morning News to create a five-hour local block in the morning. At the same time, the station purchased and installed its own weather radar, located near Christmas. An 8 p.m. newscast on WRBW was added in 2019.

WOFL provides the East Coast operations for the Fox local stations' streaming news channel, LiveNow from Fox, originating the channel in the morning hours before KSAZ-TV in Phoenix takes over.

== Technical information ==
WOFL's transmitter is located in Bithlo, Florida. The station's signal is multiplexed:

Subchannels of WOFL
Subchannel	Res.	Short name	Programming
35.1	720p	WOFL	Fox
35.2	480i	Buzzr	Buzzr
35.3	480i	FOX WX	Fox Weather
65.1	720p	WRBW	MyNetworkTV (WRBW)

Broadcast on behalf of another station

WOFL was the first television station in the Orlando market to broadcast its digital signal in February 2000, on channel 22. The analog signal was shut down on the digital transition date of June 12, 2009. WOFL continued to use channel 22 for digital broadcasts until being repacked to channel 33 on January 17, 2020, as a result of the 2016 United States wireless spectrum auction.
