= Stephen Morgan (meteorologist) =

American television personality (born 1989)

- Born: 1989 (age 36–37); St. Louis, Missouri, U.S.
- Occupation: Television meteorologist
- Years active: 2013–present
- Notable credit(s): Fox Weather co-anchor, host
- Title: meteorologist, host, co-anchor
- Spouse: Steven Romo (m. 2022)
- Website: Fox Weather

Stephen Morgan is a meteorologist and host for Fox Weather, leading coverage for the channel's main weekday hours. Morgan is based in New York City. Previously, he served as a meteorologist at KRIV-TV in Houston. Morgan moved to the East Coast with his husband Steven Romo in 2021.

== Early life ==
Morgan grew up in the suburbs of Saint Louis. His family was deeply religious, attending an Assemblies of God church. In an interview with The Advocate, Morgan said he figured out early on he is gay, and he fasted and prayed asking God to "fix" him. Eventually, he came out to his parents and sister, hoping they could assist him in "obeying God" by not being gay. He spoke of a slow process and eventual turning point he and his family underwent before ultimately realizing Morgan was exactly as God made him.

== Personal life ==
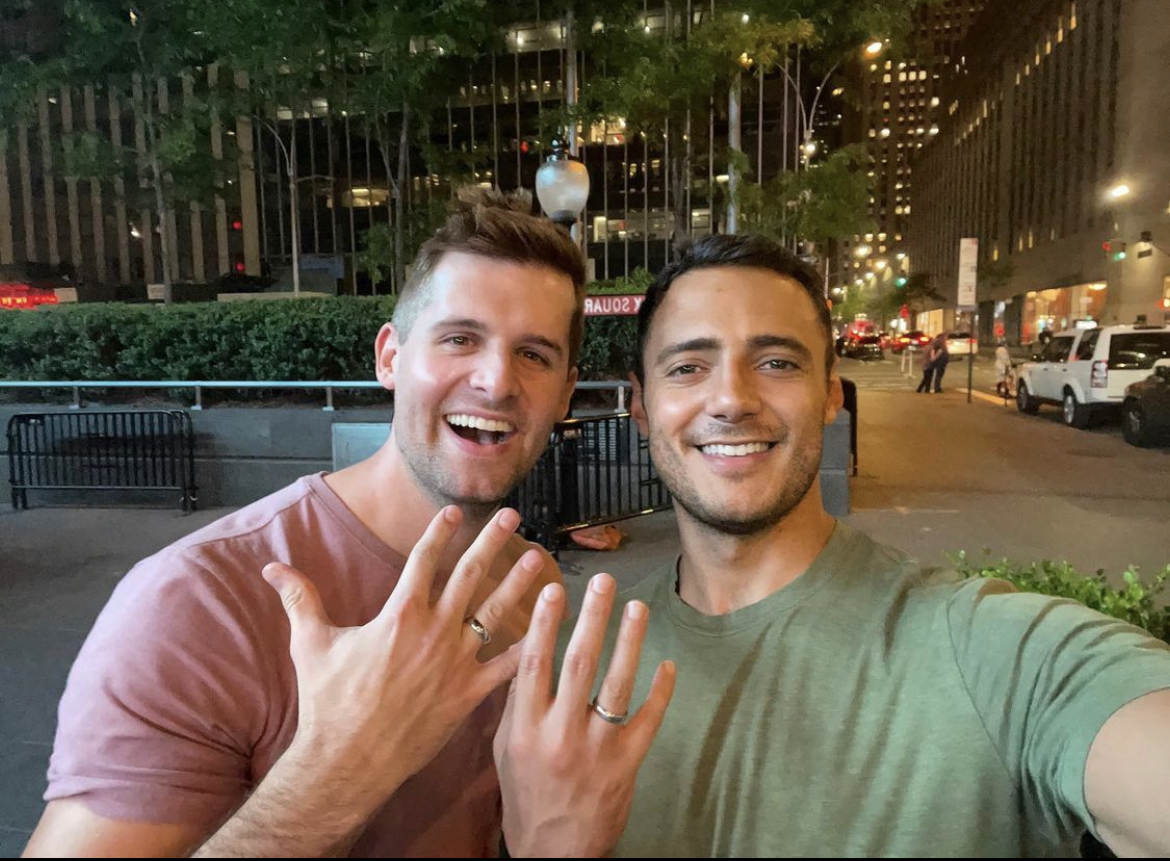
Morgan and NBC's Steven Romo announce their engagement.

Morgan announced his engagement to NBC News correspondent Steven Romo in July 2021. The pair reportedly met in Houston while covering Hurricane Harvey and began dating thereafter. News of the engagement went viral and made headlines in mainstream and gay publications worldwide, including Yahoo! News, E! News, Miami Herald, Houston Chronicle, Kansas City Star, Fort Worth Star Telegram, Instinct, Out, DNA, The Advocate and more.

The couple married on October 8, 2022, in Dallas, Texas at a venue on White Rock Lake in front of 125 guests. Their wedding also garnered a great deal of media attention, appearing in The New York Times Sunday Styles section, People Magazine and more.

== Career ==
Morgan joined Fox Weather from the FOX-owned station in Houston, Texas. He serves as meteorologist, anchor and host of the main daypart programming.

Morgan is a graduate of Saint Louis University with a degree in meteorology.

== See also ==
- LGBT culture in New York City
- List of LGBT people from New York City
- New Yorkers in journalism
