= WRBW =

Television station in Orlando, Florida

ATSC 3.0 station
- Orlando, Florida; United States
- Channels: Digital: 28 (UHF); Virtual: 65
- Branding: Fox Orlando Plus

Programming
- Affiliations: 65.1: Independent with MyNetworkTV; for others, see § Subchannels

Ownership
- Owner: Fox Television Stations, LLC
- Sister stations: WOFL

History
- First air date: June 6, 1994
- Former channel numbers: Analog: 65 (UHF, 1994–2009); Digital: 41 (UHF, 2002–2020)
- Former affiliations: Independent (1994–1995); UPN (1995–2006)
- Call sign meaning: Original owner Rainbow Broadcasting

Technical information
- Licensing authority: FCC
- Facility ID: 54940
- ERP: 1,000 kW
- HAAT: 447 m (1,467 ft)
- Transmitter coordinates: 28°36′14″N 81°5′10″W

Links
- Public license information: Public file; LMS
- Website: fox35orlando.com/fox35plus

WRBW (channel 65), branded as Fox Orlando Plus, is a television station in Orlando, Florida, United States. It is programmed primarily as an independent station, but maintains a secondary affiliation with MyNetworkTV. WRBW is owned by Fox Television Stations alongside WOFL (channel 35) and the two stations share studios on Skyline Drive in Lake Mary; WRBW's transmitter is located in Bithlo, Florida.

Channel 65 in Orlando spent nearly twelve years in hearings and multiple protracted legal battles. After four groups sought the permit, the Federal Communications Commission (FCC) awarded the station to Rainbow Broadcasting, headed by Cuban immigrant Joseph Rey, in 1984. Metro Broadcasting, another applicant, challenged the FCC's comparative hearing criteria, which included a preference for minority and female ownership of broadcast stations. At a time when affirmative action restrictions were under new scrutiny, Metro's challenge lingered at the FCC and the courts for years and was not finally adjudicated until the U.S. Supreme Court ruled in favor of the commission in Metro Broadcasting, Inc. v. FCC in 1990. That decision granted Rey the construction permit for WRBW, but he soon became enmeshed in a years-long tower site space dispute with WKCF, the new station's most direct potential competitor. At one point, tower site management had to override WKCF management, who were not willing to reduce power to let WRBW's antenna be safely attached to the tower.

WRBW went on the air on June 6, 1994. It operated as an independent station for less than a year before affiliating with the startup UPN in January 1995. The station added a local newscast produced by WFTV and, after being purchased by United Television in 1999, Orlando Magic basketball games to its lineup. Fox acquired WRBW in its 2001 purchase of United Television and traded for WOFL to create a duopoly. The station affiliated with MyNetworkTV in 2006 when UPN folded; in 2019, WRBW was rebranded as Fox 35 Plus, an extension of WOFL with a dedicated 8 p.m. local newscast.

== Prehistory ==
=== Hearing battle ===
In 1982, four groups applied for a construction permit to build a new TV station on channel 65 in Orlando, Florida. The channel had been inserted on a petition by Astro Enterprises, owner of WWBC in Cocoa, which presented engineering studies showing the channel was viable. The first group to seek the channel was Metro Broadcasting, a consortium led by Orlando car dealer and state representative Art Grindle and featuring a variety of local businesspeople. Three other groups filed at the deadline: Winter Park Communications, a company with Virginia and local interests whose application specified nearby Winter Park instead of Orlando as the city of license; Orlando Family Television, whose backers hailed from Georgia; and Rainbow Broadcasting Company, owned by Joseph Rey of Coral Gables. These firms faced a comparative hearing at the Federal Communications Commission (FCC), in which the applications would be judged on several criteria, including integration of ownership and management (whether owners were involved in station operations) and an affirmative action criterion on minority ownership. Metro Broadcasting originally did not have any minority investors but brought on a Black part-owner of a car dealership; Winter Park Communications had a Hispanic investor; one investor in Orlando Family Television was Black; and Rey's consortium included investors of Cuban descent, including Rey himself, a Cuban immigrant whose family fled the country when he was 11 in 1961.

The initial decision from FCC administrative law judge Walter Miller, issued December 14, 1983, favored Metro Broadcasting over Winter Park and Rainbow. The judge had dismissed Orlando Family Television, who successfully appealed the action to the FCC review board. The entire case came to the review board, which in December 1984 overturned Miller's initial decision and awarded channel 65 to Rainbow Broadcasting, whom Miller had disqualified for misrepresenting the involvement of one of its principals in station operations in another application in Sacramento, California. The review board disagreed with the denial and found that Rainbow beat Metro Broadcasting slightly on the integration criterion.

Metro challenged this ruling as well as the FCC's affirmative action practice of favoring women and minorities. In 1986, the FCC asked a court to declare these policies unconstitutional, an action that came under fire from minority and women's organizations, and it asked for Metro's legal challenge to be remanded to it so it could determine whether the preferences were of "decisional significance" in the channel 65 case; it found this to be the case. In 1987, Metro wrote in a separate commission proceeding on these preferences that they were unconstitutional: "Because the qualitative comparative criteria are few, the minority and gender preferences, especially when combined, assume overwhelming importance, unconstitutionally depriving nonfavored applicants of equal protection in violation of the Fifth Amendment." The proceeding, which was later shut down by Congress, delayed the whole case a year. Winter Park Communications also challenged but on different legal grounds: it believed that, because Orlando already had licensed TV stations and Winter Park did not, the grant of another Orlando-licensed station was inequitable and violated the Communications Act of 1934.

The United States Court of Appeals for the District of Columbia Circuit heard the case in late 1988. A majority of members of the three-judge panel believed that they were bound by precedent to uphold the minority preferences because of a 1984 decision, West Michigan Broadcasting Corporation; Metro was supported by an amicus curiae brief from the U.S. Department of Justice, but the FCC reversed its earlier stance and came out in support of minority preferences. The court, first in a three-judge panel and later in an en banc rehearing, backed the FCC's award of channel 65 to Rainbow Broadcasting in deciding Winter Park Communications, Inc. v. FCC. Metro Broadcasting announced that it was prepared to appeal the adverse rulings. Analysts, including those in favor of the affirmative action policies, believed that recent rulings were unfavorable to their cause.

Metro Broadcasting petitioned the Supreme Court of the United States for review of the D.C. Circuit decision in September 1989, arguing that precedent failed to be narrowly tailored and that a review would resolve inconsistencies in recent legal cases. Concurrently with its ruling in Winter Park Communications, the D.C. Circuit decided a separate case that also related to minority preferences, but its ruling was opposite. The Shurberg Broadcasting of Hartford, Inc. case was a years-long challenge to the FCC's distress sale policies, which permitted minorities to buy stations facing hearing actions for below market value, and was decided in favor of Alan Shurberg, who had challenged the distress sale of WHCT in Hartford, Connecticut. The Supreme Court announced it would take up the cases on January 8, 1990. The news excited Metro's lawyer, who predicted that one of Winter Park or Shurberg Broadcasting of Hartford would be reversed, and came as a disappointment to Rainbow's legal counsel.

Briefs by the FCC, in the Shurberg portion of the case, and the Department of Justice, in the Metro portion of the case, illustrated opposing views on affirmative action programs, which the FCC defended and the Department of Justice attacked. The case was of interest to many court watchers due to its possible impact outside of broadcasting. During oral argument, the justices hinted that the scarcity of mass media outlets, radio frequencies and TV channels and the regulated status of broadcasting might move them to allow preferential policies.

On June 27, 1990, the last day of the court's term, the Supreme Court handed down its decision in Metro Broadcasting, Inc. v. FCC. In a 5–4 decision authored by liberal justice William J. Brennan Jr. and unusually joined by the conservative Byron White, the court upheld the FCC's policies giving preference to women and minorities and the distress sale policy.

=== Press vs. Rainbow: Antenna battle ===
After the Supreme Court released the Metro Broadcasting decision, Joseph Rey told The Orlando Sentinel that he believed WRBW could get on the air within twelve months. However, construction did not begin until October 1993, by which time work had started at a rental tower site in the tower farm in Bithlo, ahead of a March 1994 deadline to complete construction.

Rainbow Broadcasting's efforts to construct WRBW soon took another legal turn. In 1986, anticipating the construction of WRBW, Rey had leased space on a tower in Bithlo, whose owner later—in 1990—let some of that space be used by Press Communications, owner of Orlando-market independent station WKCF. At the time, WKCF was moving from channel 68 to channel 18, an action that Rainbow had previously protested. A judge upheld the tower owner's decision, finding that Rey's lease was nonexclusive. Press charged Rey with delaying the move of WKCF and thus reducing its revenues. When it came time for WRBW's antenna to be mounted on the tower, WKCF officials refused to reduce power to allow the work to be conducted safely; only the intervention of the tower owner, who reduced WKCF's power over its objection, allowed installation to proceed, ultimately leaving their antennas mounted 17 feet (5.2 m) apart atop the 1,500-foot (460 m) mast. By March 1994, Press had five pending legal proceedings against Rey and Rainbow, alleging a secret meeting between Rey and FCC officials in 1993, when the construction permit had expired; challenging a reinstatement of the construction permit; and demanding the FCC require the WRBW antenna be removed from the tower. As a result, even though the transmitter and antenna had been installed, WRBW still was not on the air because it had installed a different antenna than its FCC application originally specified.

If the federal courts gave out combat medals, Orlando businessman Joseph Rey would be a Bronze Star winner—with a couple of oak-leaf clusters.

— Mark Gimein, Mediaweek, in a 1996 article on the wrangling between Press and Rainbow

On May 23, 1994, the FCC dismissed Press's objections to the construction permit grant. It attributed the delays in WRBW signing on the air to court challenges, including those from Press, and said Rainbow could not be expected to build the station while they were pending, but it still needed to approve the new antenna. The final lawsuit filed by Press was dismissed in April 1995, and an FCC administrative law judge dismissed Press's other petitions in April 1997.

== History ==
=== Early years ===
Nearly twelve years after the original filing and nearly four years after the Supreme Court decision in Metro Broadcasting, WRBW began broadcasting on June 6, 1994. It cost $5 million to put the station on the air. The new independent station sought to build an identity by aggressively counterprogramming its competitors, including airing cartoons in the early evening hours. It also featured movies and classic comedies. The station had already secured space for permanent studios and offices at Universal Studios Florida.

WRBW became a network affiliate after seven months on air with the January 1995 launch of UPN. While UPN had courted WKCF first, that station opted to affiliate with UPN's rival, The WB, leaving UPN to agree to an affiliation with channel 65 just over a month before its debut. On March 24, 1997, WRBW began airing a half-hour weeknight 10 p.m. newscast produced by Orlando's ABC affiliate, WFTV (channel 9)—the second newscast in that time slot in the market.

United Television—a subsidiary of Chris-Craft Industries and half-owner of UPN—agreed to buy WRBW from Rainbow in October 1997. The $60.3 million transaction did not close until July 1999. After it closed, the station made several programming changes, updating its daytime lineup with more recent shows.

WRBW took over from WKCF as the broadcast television carrier of Orlando Magic basketball in 1999, splitting games with the cable Sunshine Network. Channel 65 served in this role for eight seasons before the Magic opted to sell their rights exclusively to cable beginning in 2007.

=== Fox ownership ===
Fox Television Stations acquired most of Chris-Craft's television stations, including WRBW, in 2001. Though speculation emerged on whether Fox would consider moving the Fox network to WRBW from its Orlando affiliate, WOFL (channel 35), this never panned out. Beginning in October 2001, speculation emerged of a potential trade between Fox Television Stations and the Meredith Corporation, owner of WOFL, that would create duopolies in Orlando and Portland, Oregon. In Portland, Meredith owned Fox affiliate KPDX, and Fox had acquired KPTV from Chris-Craft. The deal, agreed in March 2002 and completed three months later, saw WOFL and its semi-satellite in Ocala, WOGX, go to Fox while KPTV went to Meredith.

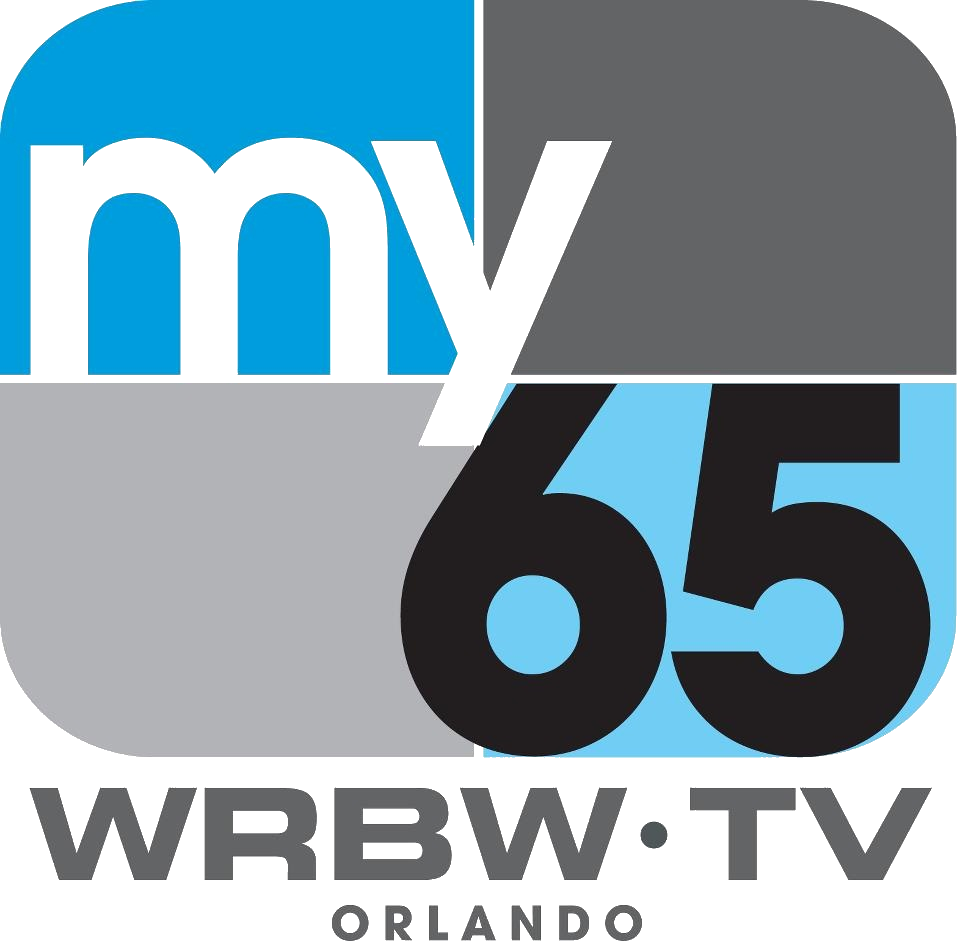
MyNetworkTV logo for WRBW, used from 2006 until 2019

On January 24, 2006, the Warner Bros. unit of Time Warner and CBS Corporation announced that the two companies would shut down UPN and The WB and replace them with a jointly owned network, The CW, incorporating their previous programs. In unveiling the merged network, while WB and UPN affiliates owned by WB minority stakeholder Tribune Broadcasting and by CBS Television Stations were announced to carry the new network, none of the Fox-owned UPN stations—many of which were competitors to Tribune- and CBS-owned stations—were chosen. Even though neither of these groups were present in Orlando, Fox president Peter Chernin moved immediately to remove all UPN branding from all of its stations. The next month, Fox parent News Corporation announced the creation of its own secondary network, MyNetworkTV, to serve its outgoing UPN stations as well as those WB and UPN affiliates owned by others that had not been selected for The CW.

Logo for WRBW, used from September 2019 until August 2026

In the 2010s and early 2020s, WRBW has been brought closer to WOFL in programming, including at one point airing some of channel 35's key non-network shows: in 2013, a significant portion of WOFL's syndicated programming inventory aired on WRBW to allow WOFL to air gavel-to-gavel coverage of the George Zimmerman trial. On September 9, 2019, WRBW was rebranded as "Fox 35 Plus", serving as a brand extension of WOFL; in addition, the station debuted an 8 p.m. newscast.

In 2019, Major League Soccer (MLS) team Orlando City SC signed a multi-year deal with WRBW to broadcast locally-televised matches. The arrangement was extended in 2021, with 24 of 35 regular-season fixtures slated for broadcast on WRBW, but all MLS local television rights agreements ended after 2022 to make way for the league's 10-year television rights deal with Apple.

On August 30, 2026, WRBW rebranded as "Fox Orlando Plus", receiving a major visual overhaul with on-air graphics similar to WOFL.

== Technical information ==
=== Subchannels ===
WRBW is a participant in Orlando's ATSC 3.0 (NextGen TV) deployment, which rolled out on July 1, 2021. The station's ATSC 1.0 channels are carried on the multiplexed signals of other Orlando television stations, which in exchange are broadcast in 3.0 format by WRBW from its transmitter in Bithlo:

Subchannels provided by WRBW (ATSC 1.0)
Subchannel	Res.	Short name	Programming	ATSC 1.0 host
65.1	720p	WRBW	Main WRBW programming	WOFL
65.2	480i	Movies.	Movies!	WRDQ
65.3	480i	H and I	Heroes & Icons	WKMG-TV
65.4	480i	QVC2.	QVC2	WFTV

Subchannels of WRBW (ATSC 3.0)
Subchannel	Res.	Short name	Programming
6.1	1080p	WKMG	CBS (WKMG-TV)
9.1	1080p	WFTV	ABC (WFTV)
27.1	1080p	WRDQ	WRDQ (Independent)
35.1	1080p	WOFL	Fox (WOFL)
65.1	1080p	WRBW	Main WRBW programming

Subchannel broadcast with digital rights management

=== Analog-to-digital conversion ===
WRBW began broadcasting a digital signal on June 1, 2002. The analog signal was shut down on the digital transition date of June 12, 2009. WRBW continued to use channel 41 for digital broadcasts until being repacked to channel 28 on January 17, 2020, as a result of the 2016 United States wireless spectrum auction.
