= Fox Television Stations =

Television station division of Fox

Fox Television Stations, LLC
- Trade name: Fox TV Stations
- Type: Division
- Industry: Broadcast television
- Predecessors: Metromedia; New World Communications; United Television; BHC Communications
- Founded: April 1986; 40 years ago
- Founders: Rupert Murdoch; Barry Diller
- Headquarters: New York City, New York, United States
- Area served: United States; Canada; Worldwide
- Key people: Jack Abernethy (CEO)
- Parent: Fox Corporation
- Divisions: 29 stations; LiveNOW from Fox; Fox Soul; MyNetworkTV; Fox Local
- Website: Fox Corporation

Fox Television Stations, LLC (FTS) is a group of television stations in the United States owned-and-operated by Fox Corporation. It owns and operates LiveNOW from Fox, Fox Local, and Fox Soul, and also oversees the MyNetworkTV syndication service.

== History ==
=== Foundations ===
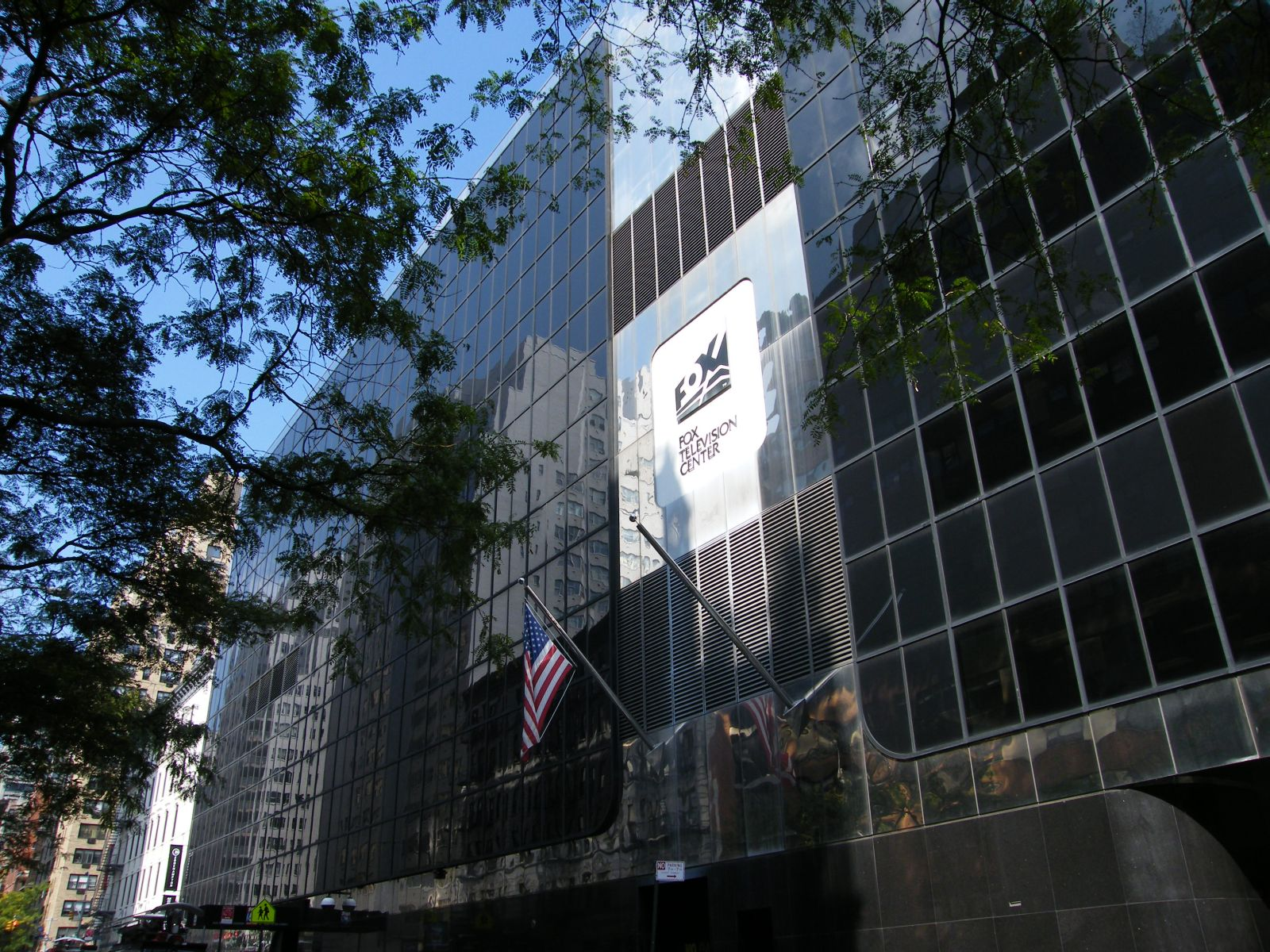
The Fox Television Center in New York City was opened by DuMont in 1954 as the DuMont Tele-Centre.

The Fox Broadcasting Company's foundations were laid in March 1985 through News Corporation's $255 million purchase of a 50% interest in TCF Holdings, the parent company of the 20th Century Fox film studio. In May 1985, News Corporation, a media company owned by Australian publishing magnate Rupert Murdoch that had mainly served as a newspaper publisher at the time of the TCF Holdings deal, agreed to pay $2.55 billion to acquire independent television stations in six major U.S. cities from the John Kluge-run broadcasting company Metromedia: WNEW-TV (now WNYW) in New York City, WTTG in Washington, D.C., KTTV in Los Angeles, KRIV in Houston, WFLD in Chicago, and KRLD-TV (now KDAF) in Dallas. A seventh station, ABC affiliate WCVB-TV in Boston, was part of the original transaction but was spun off to the Hearst Broadcasting subsidiary of the Hearst Corporation in a separate, concurrent deal as part of a right of first refusal related to that station's 1982 sale to Metromedia.

Because Metromedia, originally known as Metropolitan Broadcasting at its founding, was spun off from the failed DuMont Television Network, radio personality Clarke Ingram has suggested that the Fox network is a revival or at least a linear descendant of DuMont. The former Metromedia stations WNEW-TV (originally known as WABD) and WTTG were two of the three original owned-and-operated stations of the DuMont network, and the former base of DuMont's operations, the DuMont Tele-Centre in Manhattan, eventually became the present-day Fox Television Center.

On December 31, 1986, WXNE-TV in Boston (later renamed WFXT on January 19, 1987), became the seventh Fox-owned property, and the first to be acquired separately from News Corporation's 1986 purchase of Metromedia's six television stations. However, as the Federal Communications Commission (FCC) prohibited the common ownership of a television station and a newspaper in the same market, News Corporation had to apply for and was granted a temporary waiver in order to retain WFXT and the newspaper it had also published, the Boston Herald. In 1989, Fox placed WFXT in a trust company; the following year, it sold the station to the Boston Celtics' ownership group. News Corporation then later sold the Boston Herald in February 1994, eliminating the potential regulatory conflict with reacquiring WFXT. On October 5, 1994, Fox announced it would exercise the purchase option; it retook control of WFXT on July 7, 1995.

In 1990, FTS bought KSTU in Salt Lake City, making it the first network-owned station in Utah. In 1995, Fox transferred its production subsidiary, Fox Television Stations Productions, itself a successor to Metromedia's in-house production unit, to 20th Television, and it was renamed to Foxlab.

=== New World Communications deal ===
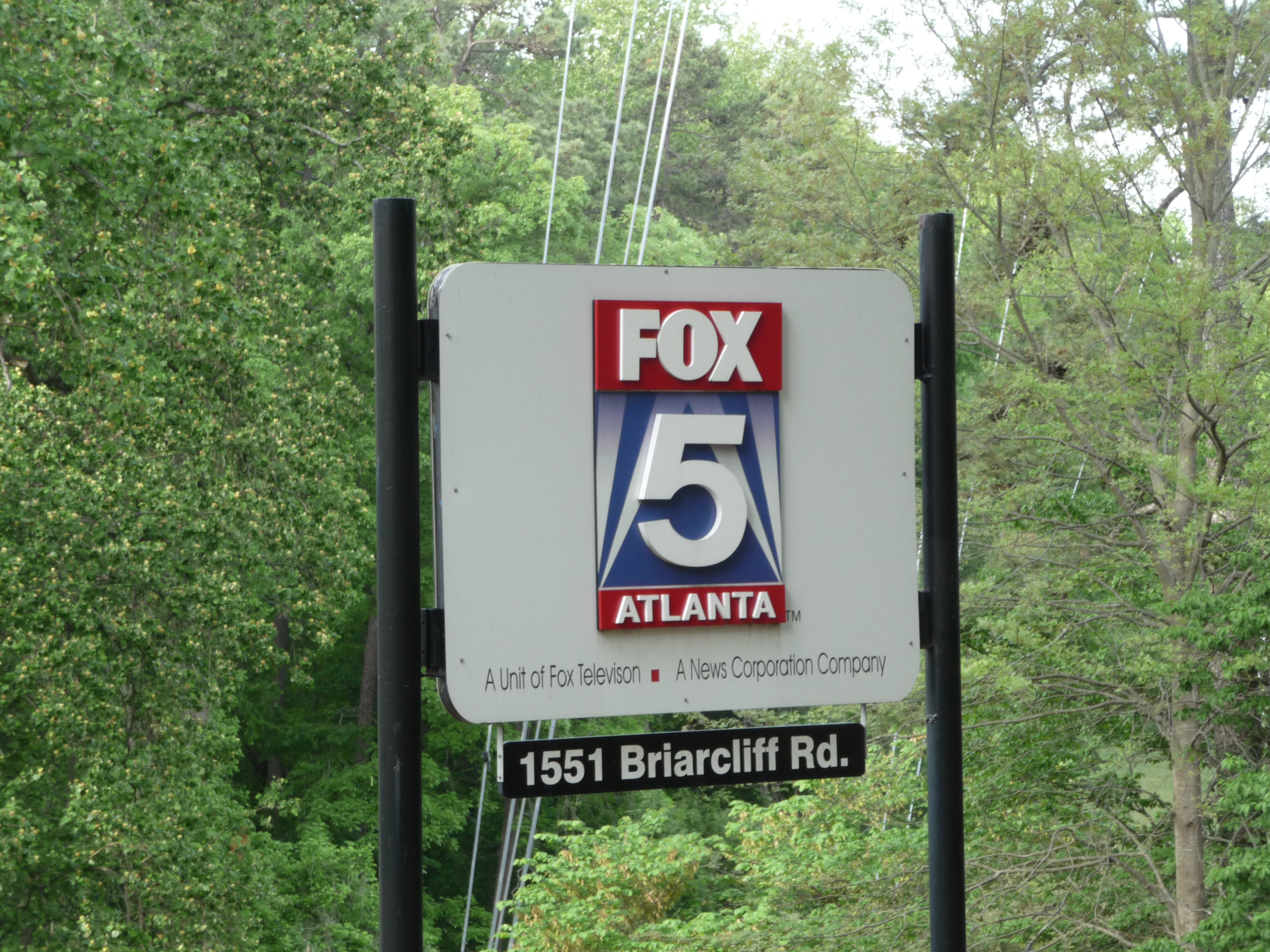
The New World Communications deal affected WAGA-TV in Atlanta, which switched to Fox after a longtime affiliation with CBS.

FTS gained a bulk of stations through the 1997 purchase of New World Communications, succeeding a 1994 business deal between the two companies which led to all of New World's stations switching from other networks to Fox during 1994–95. A significant factor that resulted in Fox's affiliation with, and later purchase of, New World Communications was Fox acquiring TV rights to the National Football League (NFL), primarily covering games involving teams in the National Football Conference (NFC). Because NFL games generate high ratings, owning these stations outright allows FTS to also collect the local advertising revenue, as well as use them as leverage during retransmission consent negotiations with cable and satellite providers.

The original 1994 affiliation deal with New World also triggered a chain of affiliation changes across the country and other multi-station affiliation deals for the next couple of years. Renaissance Broadcasting had previously sold WATL to FTS in 1993 to become a Fox owned-and-operated station, the first network-owned station in Atlanta. FTS was in the planning stages for a news department at the station, and WATL had even gone as far as hiring a news director. However, when the New World affiliation deal was signed, it was agreed that New World's and Atlanta's longtime CBS affiliate WAGA-TV switch to the Fox network. As a result, Fox cancelled the plans for a newscast on WATL and put the station up for sale.

Renaissance Broadcasting had also sold KDVR in Denver, along with its satellite station KFCT in Fort Collins, Colorado, to FTS on November 15, 1994, in exchange for acquiring KDAF in Dallas. One of original core stations that FTS acquired from Metromedia, it was set to lose Fox programming to that market's longtime CBS affiliate, New World's KDFW.

New World was also expanded its own broadcasting holdings in 1994 by buying other stations groups, but its combined purchases ran afoul with the FCC's media ownership rules at the time prohibiting a single company from owning more than twelve television stations nationwide. New World thus established a trust company in preparation for its sale of WGHP in High Point, North Carolina and WBRC in Birmingham, Alabama, which it would place the stations into in September and October 1994 respectively. Under the arrangement, New World owned the licenses of WBRC and WGHP, while its previous owner Citicasters continued to control their operations under outsourcing agreements.

In April 1995, Citicasters transferred the operations of WBRC and WGHP to the FTS, which assumed operational control through time brokerage agreements with New World. Both stations were sold directly to Fox three months later on July 22, 1995.

FTS also acquired WHBQ-TV in Memphis in an unrelated deal on August 18, 1994.

Among the other affiliation changes, most notable was Westinghouse Broadcasting's affiliation deal with CBS in 1995. This set off a complex trade of Philadelphia stations between CBS/Westinghouse and NBC; FTS instead independently bought its own Philadelphia station, WTXF-TV.

When New World's sale to Fox closed in 1997, ten stations became Fox owned-and-operated stations: KSAZ-TV in Phoenix; WTVT in Tampa, Florida; WAGA-TV in Atlanta; WJBK in Detroit; KTBC in Austin, Texas; KDFW in Dallas; WDAF-TV in Kansas City, Missouri; KTVI in St. Louis; WJW in Cleveland; and WITI in Milwaukee.

=== Chris-Craft deal ===
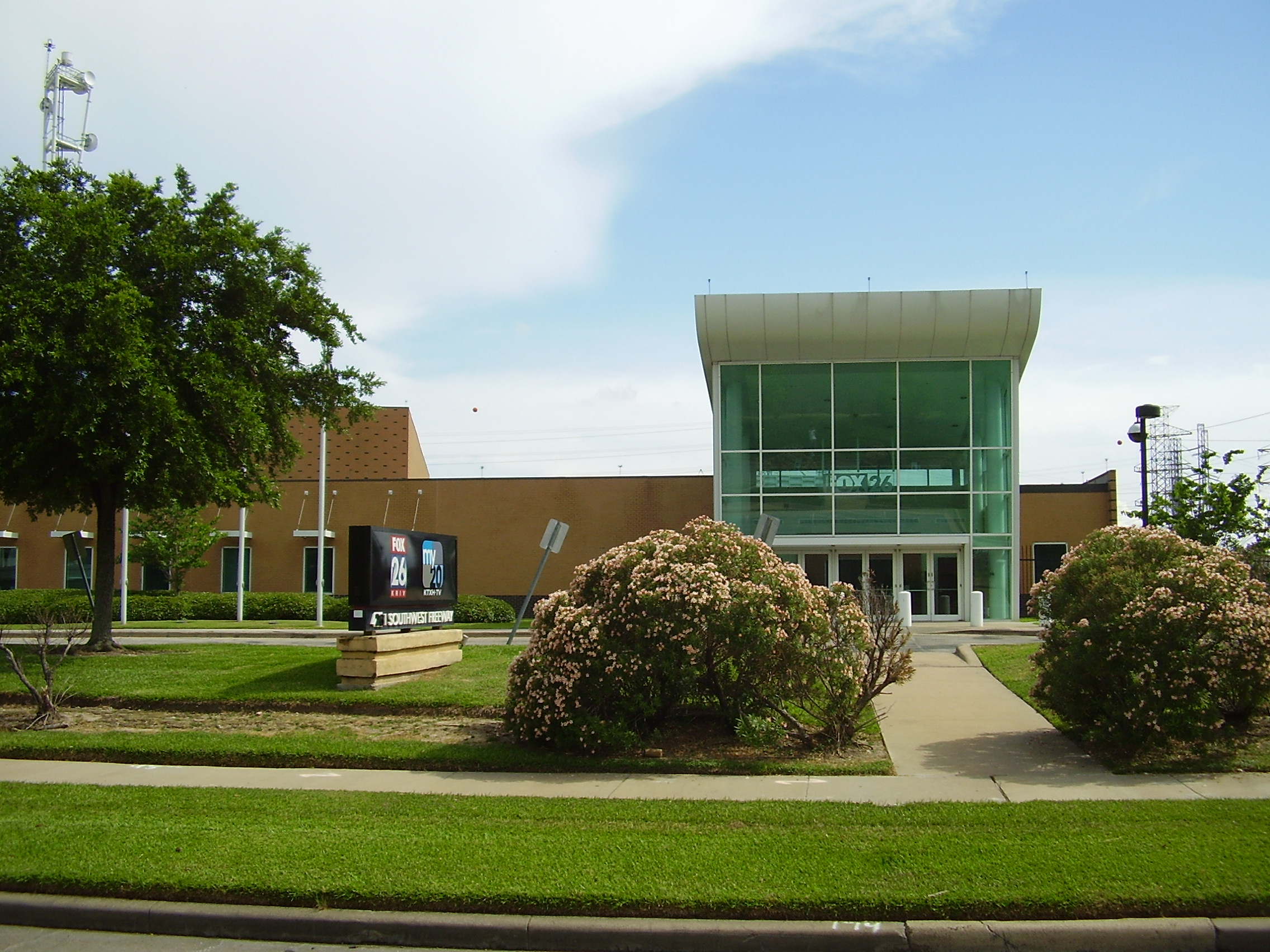
The studios for KRIV and KTXH in Houston, one of the duopolies FTS created after the Chris-Craft acquisition and its subsequent trades

FTS gained stations through the 2000 acquisition of the Chris-Craft/United group, which gave Fox ownership of several stations then affiliated with the UPN network (which had been a partnership between Chris-Craft and Viacom (Paramount's subsidiary) until March 2000 when the latter company bought the former's stake), and also created several duopolies (two stations in the same market owned by the same company). When the deal was finalized in 2001, this immediately created duopolies (two stations in the same market owned by the same company) between Fox and former Chris-Craft stations in markets such as Phoenix (KSAZ and KUTP), Los Angeles (KTTV and KCOP-TV) and New York City (WNYW and WWOR-TV).

Although former Chris-Craft station KTVX would have also created a duopoly with Fox station KSTU in Salt Lake City, FCC regulations at the time prohibited one company from owning two of the four highest-rated stations in a single market. FTS thus traded both KTVX and the former Chris-Craft station KMOL (now WOAI-TV) in San Antonio to Clear Channel Communications in 2001 in exchange for WFTC in Minneapolis, creating a duopoly for FTS with former Chris-Craft station KMSP-TV. Because KMSP had the stronger signal due to being a VHF station, while WFTC was a UHF station, FTS decided to switch the affiliations in 2002, with Fox programming going to KMSP and WFTC taking over the UPN affiliation.

FTS then bought KDFI in Dallas in 2000 and WPWR-TV in Chicago in 2002 to create duopolies with Fox-owned stations, KDFW and WFLD, respectively. FTS also made two other trades in 2002 to create more duopolies. Former Chris-Craft station KPTV in Portland, Oregon was traded to the Meredith Corporation in exchange for WOFL in Orlando, Florida, creating a duopoly with former Chris-Craft station WRBW. FTS then traded former Chris-Craft station KBHK (now KPYX) in San Francisco to Viacom for UPN stations KTXH in Houston and WDCA in Washington, D.C., creating duopolies with original Fox-owned stations KRIV and WTTG, receptively. WUTB in Baltimore was the only acquired Chris-Craft station during this time that FTS did not trade away or create a duopoly with.

=== Formation of MyNetworkTV ===
The studios for KDFW and KDFI in Dallas

The Fox-owned UPN affiliates were not included in the UPN/WB merger (The CW), which was announced on January 23, 2006. Soon after, these stations removed references to UPN from their on-air branding and websites. On February 22, 2006, FTS announced that all nine of their non-Fox outlets will be charter affiliates of a new service known as MyNetworkTV, which commenced operations on September 5, 2006, with telenovela programming that was original to be syndicated. On May 23, 2016, it was announced that one of the Fox-owned former UPN affiliates that were left out of the initial negotiations for CW affiliation a decade earlier, MyNetworkTV owned-and-operated station WPWR in Chicago, would be taking over the market's affiliation with the network from rival WGN-TV in September of that year. MyNetworkTV remained on WPWR as a secondary affiliation until 2019, when the CW affiliation transferred to WCIU-TV.

On December 21, 2007, FTS announced that it would sell eight smaller-market stations to Local TV, LLC, a division of Oak Hill Capital Partners. Six of the stations that were sold were ex-New World stations, including the two stations that were first acquired by FTS directly in 1995 (WGHP in High Point, North Carolina and WBRC in Birmingham, Alabama) and four via the 1997 merger (WDAF-TV in Kansas City, Missouri; KTVI in St. Louis; WJW in Cleveland; and WITI in Milwaukee. The other three were KSTU in Salt Lake City, and KDVR in Denver and with its satellite station KFCT in Fort Collins, Colorado. The transaction was completed in 2008.

In January 2009, NBC Owned Television Stations and FTS set up the first Local News Service with their Philadelphia stations after testing since the summer 2008. Fox and NBC then added other markets where they both own stations.

On May 15, 2012, as part of a five-year affiliation agreement extension between Fox and Sinclair Broadcast Group's 19 Fox affiliates (including company flagship WBFF) that will run through 2017, Fox included an option for Sinclair to purchase WUTB, exercisable from July 1, 2012, to March 31, 2013. On November 29, 2012, Sinclair exercised its option to purchase WUTB through Deerfield Media. On May 6, 2013, the FCC granted its approval of WUTB to Deerfield Media, which was formally consummated on June 1.

=== Expansion into more NFL markets ===
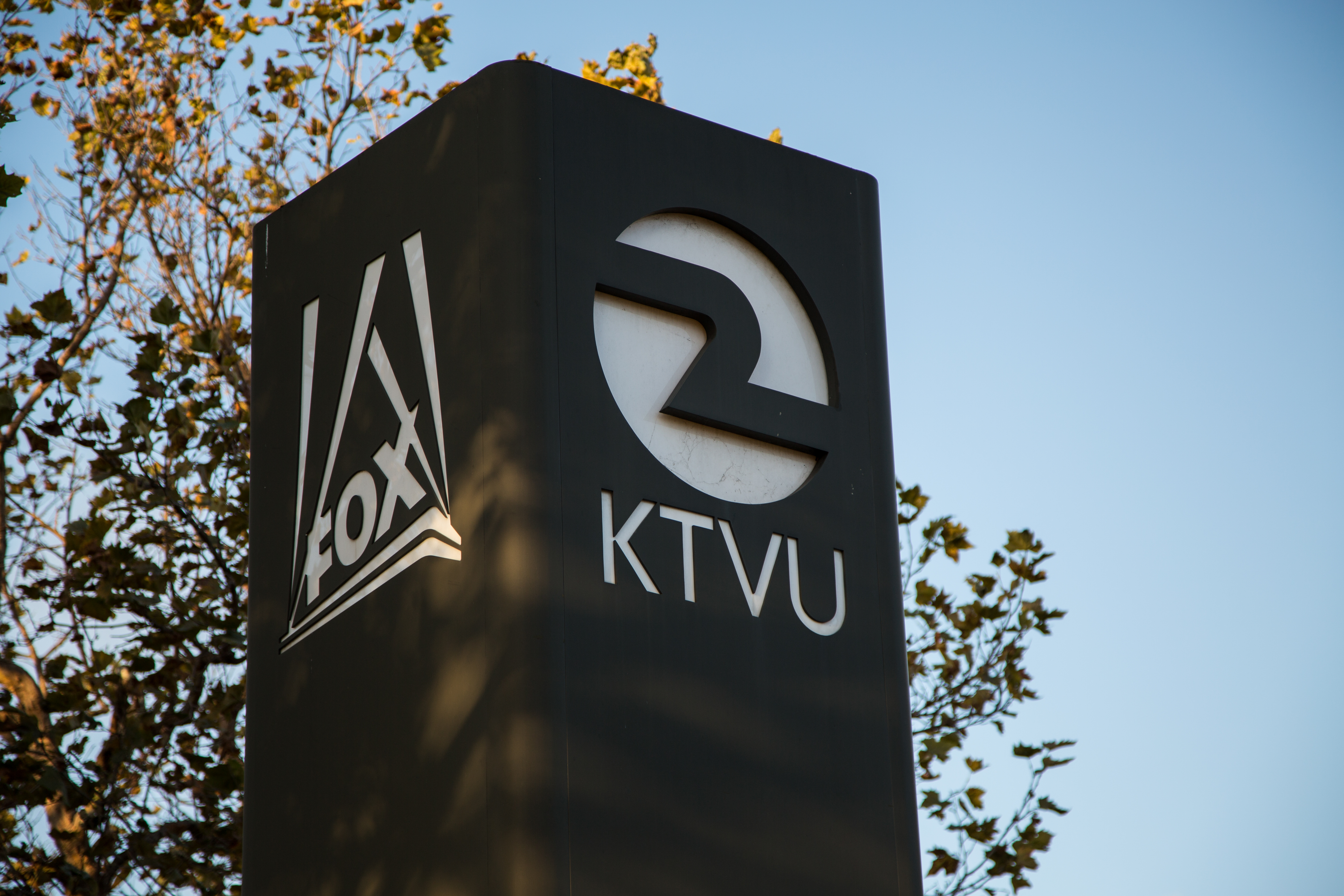
Longtime Fox affiliate KTVU in the San Francisco Bay Area was one of the several stations in NFL markets that FTS acquired during the 2010s.

On January 28, 2013, FTS announced that 17 of their stations would be affiliating with new subchannel network, Movies!, with an agreement between FTS and Weigel Broadcasting, to add the channel on the subchannels of Fox O&O stations. That same day, the company announced it would be acquiring the Charlotte duopoly of CW affiliate WJZY and MyNetworkTV affiliate WMYT-TV from Capitol Broadcasting Company. The deal was approved by the FCC on March 11 and completed on April 17. As part of the deal, WJZY became a Fox owned-and-operated station on July 1. The station community believed that the Charlotte station's purchase by FTS is proof that Fox is interested in owning a TV station in NFL markets (specifically those with NFC teams, as Charlotte is) to up the station groups' "bargaining power in retransmission consent negotiations with cable, satellite and telco operators."

As part of the restructuring that stemmed from the News Corporation/21st Century Fox split, it was announced on July 8, 2013, that 20th Television, which was until that time under FTS, will operate under the management of 20th Century Fox Television.

On June 24, 2014, FTS announced it would acquire its existing San Francisco Bay Area affiliate KTVU, along with its duopoly sister independent station KICU-TV, from Cox Media Group in exchange for WFXT in Boston and WHBQ-TV in Memphis. The station sale/trade was completed on October 8, 2014. Fox's motivation for acquiring KTVU was that it was another NFL market with an NFC team.

In addition to FTS's aforementioned purchases of Charlotte's WJZY in 2013 and the San Francisco Bay Area's KTVU in 2014, Variety reported that Fox is also interested in acquiring stations in the following other NFL markets: Seattle and St. Louis (the latter's KTVI had previously been owned by Fox, but was included in the 2007 sale to Local TV; with the St. Louis Rams relocating to Los Angeles starting with the 2016 NFL season, there is no word as to whether or not FTS' pursuit of a station in the St. Louis market has diminished). While discussions with Seattle's Fox affiliate KCPQ and its owner Tribune Broadcasting remained ongoing, Fox struck a deal on September 19, 2014, to buy KBCB, a station in nearby Bellingham, for $10 million; the purchase, submitted for FCC approval on October 3, was described as a "strategic option" for Fox by an insider. Tribune then agreed on October 17 to extend its affiliation agreement for KCPQ through July 2018, and pay increased reverse compensation fees to Fox for the broadcasting of the network's programming beginning in January 2015. Fox's application to acquire KBCB was dismissed by the FCC on November 20, 2014.

On January 20, 2015, it was announced that Fox Television Stations would be a charter launch partner for Buzzr, a new digital multicast network from Debmar-Mercury and FremantleMedia North America devoted to classic game shows, which launched that June. Later in the year, FTS also agreed to carry Weigel Broadcasting's Heroes & Icons network on subchannels of 11 major market stations.

On April 30, 2017, it was reported that 21st Century Fox was in talks to purchase Tribune Media in a joint venture with the Blackstone Group. On May 7, 2017, it was reported that Sinclair Broadcast Group was nearing a deal to purchase Tribune Media, and that 21st Century Fox had dropped its bid for the company. The deal was officially announced the next day. (However, on August 9, 2018, Tribune canceled the Sinclair deal.) On August 2, 2017, it was reported that 21st Century Fox was in talks to form a similar joint venture with Ion Media in an effort to counter Sinclair and displace Fox affiliations from their stations; analysts felt that the proposed partnership was meant as a bargaining ploy against Sinclair, as it would have to make significant investments into the acquired stations to make them profitable and capable of producing local news programming (Ion stations have historically had few employees or local infrastructure), and that Fox risked losing viewers through these transitions.

In January 2018, the Financial Times reported that FTS was finalizing a deal to acquire as many as 10 Fox affiliates from Sinclair, as part of an effort to reach FCC approval of its proposed acquisition of Tribune Media. The deal would likely include Seattle's KCPQ (as Sinclair already owns ABC affiliate KOMO-TV there), KOKH-TV in Oklahoma City (Tribune already owns KFOR-TV), KSTU-TV in Salt Lake City (Sinclair already owns KUTV), KTVI in St. Louis (Sinclair owns KDNL) and Tribune's Fox/CW duopoly of KDVR and KWGN in Denver. This deal would bring several former O&Os previously divested to Local TV, LLC (which was acquired by Tribune) back under Fox ownership.

On May 9, 2018, Fox announced it would purchase KCPQ, KDVR, KSTU, KTXL in Sacramento, KSWB-TV in San Diego, WJW in Cleveland and WSFL-TV, the CW affiliate for Miami-Fort Lauderdale. The move would give Fox stations in the home markets for the Seattle Seahawks, Denver Broncos, Cleveland Browns and Miami Dolphins as the network takes over the Thursday Night Football package from CBS and NBC. After Tribune terminated its merger agreement with Sinclair on August 9, 2018, however, the sale of the seven aforementioned stations to FTS was likewise nullified.

=== Fox Corporation subsidiary ===
On December 14, 2017, after rumors of such a sale, The Walt Disney Company announced that it would purchase FTS's parent company, 21st Century Fox for $52.4 billion, plus the assumption of $13.7 billion in debt by Fox, subject to government approval. FTS, along with several other assets was spun off into Fox Corporation, a company owned by the Murdoch family. The deal was completed on March 20, 2019.

With the loss of Twentieth Television in the deal, Fox Stations set up its own syndication arm, Fox First Run, despite some of their syndicated shows being distributed in conjunction with Warner Bros. Domestic Television Distribution and Dish Nation has barter sales with Trifecta Entertainment and Media.

On November 5, 2019, Nexstar Media Group announced an agreement to sell WITI in Milwaukee (effectively a re-purchase) and KCPQ and KZJO in Seattle to Fox Television Stations, and would purchase from Fox WJZY and WMYT-TV in Charlotte. This gives Fox additional two bigger NFL team market stations in the Green Bay Packers and Seattle Seahawks while losing the Carolina Panthers market.

==== Streaming ====
On January 13, 2020, FTS launched Fox Soul, a free ad-supported streaming television (FAST) channel targeting the African American community.

Also in 2020, FTS launched LiveNOW from Fox, a streaming news channel jointly operated by KSAZ, KTTV, and WOFL. The channel carries live coverage of breaking news events throughout the day as directed by a small crew of digital journalists, leveraging resources and raw footage from Fox's local news departments. The service originated from a Fox 10 News Now webcast that had been run by KSAZ; amid the COVID-19 pandemic, the channel soft launched a national expansion by becoming "CoronavirusNow" (with contributions from the national Fox News and Fox Business networks), before adopting its current name later that year.

In May 2023, FTS launched a new streaming platform known as Fox Local; the app primarily carries video content from Fox-owned stations, including local news programming, as well as the LiveNow, Fox Weather, and Fox Soul channels.

== Units ==
- Fox Television Stations
  - 18 Fox owned-and-operated (O&O) stations
  - 11 MyNetworkTV O&O stations
- Fox Television Stations Productions
- Fox First Run (2019—present) first run syndication arm; shows: Divorce Court, Dish Nation, 25 Words or Less, TMZ on TV/TMZ Live/TMZ Sports, You Bet Your Life
- Fox Soul (January 13, 2020—present)
- LiveNow from Fox (previously NewsNow and CoronavirusNOW, 2014–present)
- MyNetworkTV
- Fox Local

== Stations ==
Stations are arranged alphabetically by state and city of license.

- (**) – Indicates station was Fox-owned from the network's inception in 1986.

=== Current ===
List of stations currently owned by Fox
Media market	State/Dist.	Station	Channel	Purchased	Affiliation	Notes
Phoenix	Arizona	KSAZ-TV	10	1997	Fox	
Phoenix	Arizona	KUTP	45	2001	MyNetworkTV	
Los Angeles	California	KTTV **	11	1986	Fox	
Los Angeles	California	KCOP	13	2001	MyNetworkTV	
San Francisco–Oakland–San Jose	California	KTVU	2	2014	Fox	
San Francisco–Oakland–San Jose	California	KICU-TV	36	2014	MyNetworkTV	
Washington, D.C.	District of Columbia	WTTG **	5	1986	Fox	
Washington, D.C.	District of Columbia	WDCA	20	2002	MyNetworkTV	
Ocala–Gainesville	Florida	WOGX	51	2002	Fox	(Note: Semi-satellite of WOFL.)
Orlando–Daytona Beach	Florida	WOFL	35	2002	Fox	
Orlando–Daytona Beach	Florida	WRBW	65	2001	MyNetworkTV	
Tampa–St. Petersburg	Florida	WTVT	13	1997	Fox	
Atlanta	Georgia	WAGA-TV	5	1997	Fox	
Chicago	Illinois	WFLD **	32	1986	Fox	
Chicago	Illinois	WPWR-TV	50	2002	MyNetworkTV	
Detroit	Michigan	WJBK	2	1997	Fox	
Minneapolis–St. Paul	Minnesota	KMSP-TV	9	2001	Fox	
Minneapolis–St. Paul	Minnesota	WFTC	9.2	2002	MyNetworkTV	
Minneapolis–St. Paul	Minnesota	KFTC	26	2002	Fox; MyNetworkTV (DT2)	(Note: Satellite of WFTC.)
New York	New York	WNYW **	5	1986	Fox	
New York	New York	WWOR-TV	9	2001	MyNetworkTV	
Philadelphia	Pennsylvania	WTXF-TV	29	1995	Fox	
Austin	Texas	KTBC	7	1997	Fox	
Dallas–Fort Worth	Texas	KDFW	4	1997	Fox	
Dallas–Fort Worth	Texas	KDFI	27	2000	MyNetworkTV	
Houston	Texas	KRIV **	26	1986	Fox	
Houston	Texas	KTXH	20	2002	MyNetworkTV	
Tacoma–Seattle	Washington	KCPQ	13	2020	Fox	
Tacoma–Seattle	Washington	KZJO	22	2020	MyNetworkTV	
Milwaukee	Wisconsin	WITI	6	2020	Fox	(Note: Previously owned from 1997–2008.)

=== Former ===
Media market	State	Station	Channel	Purchased	Sold	Notes
Birmingham	Alabama	WBRC	6	1995	2008	
San Francisco–Oakland–San Jose	California	KBHK	44	2001	2002	
Denver	Colorado	KDVR	31	1995	2008	
Fort Collins	Colorado	KFCT	22	1995	2008	(Note: Satellite of KDVR.)
Atlanta	Georgia	WATL	36	1993	1995	
Baltimore	Maryland	WUTB	24	2001	2013	
Boston	Massachusetts	WCVB-TV **	5	1986		(Note: WCVB-TV was included in the original sale of the Metromedia stations to News Corporation, but was spun off in a separate, concurrent deal to the Hearst Corporation as part of a right of first refusal related to that station's 1982 acquisition by Metromedia.)
Boston	Massachusetts	WFXT	25	1987	1990	
Boston	Massachusetts	WFXT	25	1995	2014	
Kansas City	Missouri	WDAF-TV	4	1997	2008	
St. Louis	Missouri	KTVI	2	1997	2008	
Charlotte	North Carolina	WJZY	46	2013	2020	
Charlotte	North Carolina	WMYT-TV	55	2013	2020	
High Point–Greensboro–Winston-Salem	North Carolina	WGHP	8	1995	2008	
Cleveland	Ohio	WJW-TV	8	1999	2008	
Portland	Oregon	KPTV	12	2001	2002	
Memphis	Tennessee	WHBQ-TV	13	1995	2014	
Austin	Texas	K13VC	13	1997	2003	(Note: License for this station was cancelled.)
Dallas–Fort Worth	Texas	KDAF **	33	1986	1995	
San Antonio	Texas	KMOL-TV	4	2001		
Salt Lake City	Utah	KSTU	13	1990	2008	
Salt Lake City	Utah	KTVX	4	2001		

This list does not include KHON-TV in Honolulu, WLUK-TV in Green Bay, WVUE in New Orleans, and WALA-TV in Mobile, Alabama, which were owned by SF Broadcasting, a joint venture between Savoy Pictures and Fox television network, they were acquired from Burnham Broadcasting prior to the foundation of SF Broadcasting by former Fox executive Barry Diller, which also owned Silver King Broadcasting and HSN owned-and-operated stations during the entire period.
