= Mike Seidel =

American meteorologist (born 1956)

- Born: Michael Phillip Seidel; January 18, 1956 (age 70); Salisbury, Maryland
- Education: Salisbury State College (B.S., Mathematics, 1979); Pennsylvania State University (M.S., Meteorology, 1983)
- Occupations: Meteorologist, Fox Weather
- Known for: Live Coverage Of Breaking Weather
- Spouse: Christine Schroder

Michael Phillip Seidel (born January 18, 1956) is an American meteorologist best known for appearing on The Weather Channel from 1992 to 2024. He is noted for his field reporting from breaking weather including severe weather, hurricanes, and snowstorms. He was live on The Weather Channel in 46 states, DC and Puerto Rico, plus Canada, Mexico, Jamaica, and Cuba and has done over 25,000 live shots.

== Early career ==
Seidel's interest in weather started at the age of six when he began measuring snowfall in his hometown of Salisbury, Maryland. While he was in the eighth grade in school, Seidel installed a weather station on the roof of his house. He worked for four local radio stations during his high school and college years, including WJDY-AM in Salisbury, WDMV-AM in Pocomoke City and WKHI-FM in Ocean City (all three in Maryland), as well as WSUX-FM in Seaford, Delaware. After graduating from Wicomico Senior High School, now Wicomico High School, Seidel attended Salisbury State College and earned a Bachelor of Science degree, double majoring in mathematics and geography, in 1979. Seidel is also a 1979 student initiate of the Omicron Delta Kappa Circle and Phi Kappa Phi Honor Society at Salisbury State College.

Immediately after his graduation, Seidel began his television career with WMDT-TV, from 1980 to 1982, in Salisbury. Seidel also entered graduate school, and he earned his Master's degree in Meteorology at Pennsylvania State University. Seidel wrote his master's thesis under the direction of Dr. Greg Forbes, The Weather Channel's retired severe weather expert. During his graduate studies, Seidel appeared on Weather World on the Pennsylvania Public Television Network.

Seidel's first full-time broadcasting position was at WYFF-TV in Greenville, South Carolina, where he worked from 1983 through 1989. He next returned to Salisbury in 1989 to work as the meteorologist for WBOC-TV. Seidel remained there until March 1992, when he left for The Weather Channel.

== The Weather Channel ==
Seidel covered his first storm, Hurricane Edouard, on Labor Day Weekend in 1996 on Cape Cod. Since then he has covered 104 tropical storms and hurricanes, nor'easters, numerous snow and ice storms, and tornado outbreaks. He has also reported live from the PGA Tour, the Baseball All-Star Game, the World Series, and the Indianapolis 500 automobile race. From 2002 to 2012, Seidel hosted the National Football League "Kickoff Forecast" segments every Sunday morning from NFL venues.

While at The Weather Channel, Seidel appeared on numerous network news programs, including NBC's Today and Nightly News, CBS's The Early Show, CBS Mornings The CBS Evening News and CBS Sunday Morning, and ABC's Good Morning America, World News Tonight, Nightline and World News Now. Seidel has also reported live from breaking weather on CNN, Fox News, and MSNBC. Seidel filled in for Tony Perkins on ABC's Good Morning America in 2003 and for Al Roker on Today Show in 2009. He became the first Weather Channel and U.S. meteorologist to report live from Cuba during coverage of Tropical Storm Isaac August 24–26, 2012. On January 12, 2018, Seidel did his 20,000th live shot during a snowstorm in Rochester, NY. On August 31, 2023, Seidel did his 25,000th live shot covering Hurricane Idalia aftermath in Tampa, Florida.

While reporting from North Carolina during Hurricane Florence in 2018, Seidel received some media attention after a video was published showing him bracing his feet against the wind while two men casually walked by in the background. Observers on Twitter and some comedic news headlines suggested that Seidel was exaggerating the severity of the winds. In response, The Weather Channel stated, "It's important to note that the two individuals in the background are walking on concrete, and Mike Seidel is trying to maintain his footing on wet grass, after reporting on-air until 1:00 a.m. ET this morning and is undoubtedly exhausted."

Seidel was laid off on April 29, 2024, as part of broader cuts by the channel's parent company. In August 2024, Seidel moved to Fox Weather, debuting during coverage of Hurricane Debby.

== Personal life ==
Seidel was born in Salisbury, Maryland, the son of Marilyn "Lynn" (née Cahall), a nurse, and Samuel W. Seidel, an insurance executive. Seidel has been married to Christine Schroder since 1994. They have two children.
