= Mid Florida Tech =

Coordinates: 28.4723°N 81.4156°W

- 2900 W. Oak Ridge Rd. Orlando, FL 32809

Information
- Type: Public vocational school
- Established: 1963
- School district: Orange County Public Schools
- Principal: Alex Heidelberg (Senior Director)
- Website: Official web site

Mid Florida Tech is a public adult vocational school located in Orlando, Florida, part of Orange County Public Schools' Career and Technical Education department. Founded in 1963, it occupies a 106-acre (0.43 km^{2}) campus. It offers an array of programs that train students for skilled labor in diverse fields, from air conditioning and heating mechanics to real estate sales. In addition, the institution is also home to the Central Florida Fire Academy, which provides firefighting and emergency service training. Classes are held on and off-campus, and the school also features cooperative programs in conjunction with area employers.

== Personnel ==
As of 2003, some 12,000 enrollees attended 53 different programs within the school. The composition of the student body is reflective of the area's racial diversity: six percent mixed nationalities including Asian, 38 percent Hispanic, 29 percent African-American, and 27 percent White.

The staff consisted of 90 full-time instructors, 211 part-time instructors, 52 classified personnel, 14 custodians, and six administrators.

== Accreditation ==
Mid Florida Tech is accredited by the Commission of the Council on Occupational Education, the Southern Association of Colleges and Schools Commission on Middle and Secondary Schools, and the Commission on International and Trans-Regional Accreditation for Justice.
