= Fox Weather =

American streaming television network

- Country: United States
- Broadcast area: Worldwide
- Headquarters: 1211 Avenue of the Americas; New York City, New York 10036; U.S.

Programming
- Language: English

Ownership
- Owner: Fox Corporation
- Parent: Fox News Media
- Sister channels: Fox Broadcasting Company; Fox News; Fox Business; FS1; FS2; LiveNOW from Fox; Fox Soul; MyNetworkTV

History
- Launched: October 25, 2021; 5 years ago

Links
- Website: www.foxweather.com

Availability

Terrestrial
- Fox Television Stations: List of Fox Weather affiliates

Streaming media
- Fox One: fox.com: (American cable internet subscribers only; requires subscription, trial, or television provider login to access content)
- Online stream: Watch live
- YouTube: Watch live
- Service(s): DirecTV Stream, Fox One, FuboTV, Google TV, Hulu + Live TV, LG Channels, Pluto TV, Prime Video Live TV, Samsung TV Plus, Sling Freestream, The Roku Channel, Tubi, Vizio Watch Free+, Xumo, YouTube TV

Fox Weather is an American digital broadcast television network and group of streaming channels operated by Fox Corporation which launched on October 25, 2021, to provide weather forecasts and information for the United States. The service is available through free ad-supported streaming television services as well select digital subchannels of Fox Television Stations, YouTube TV, Hulu + Live TV, their own YouTube channel, Fox One, The Roku Channel, FuboTV, DirecTV Stream, Xfinity, Cox, Xumo, Amazon Fire TV, Sling Freestream, Dish Network, Samsung TV Plus, Pluto TV, its website and mobile apps, the mobile and digital media player apps of Fox, Fox News and Fox Business, the websites of Fox's owned and operated stations, the OTT service Tubi, and simulcasted on weekend mornings from 6 to 9 AM ET on Fox Business and in daytime and various weekend slots on select MyNetworkTV stations.

During significant weather events, Fox Weather is often simulcast on Fox News, LiveNOW from Fox or Fox Business.

== History ==
On December 9, 2020, Fox News Media announced the forthcoming launch of an ad-supported weather service that would include local and national weather related news. On June 24, 2021, Fox News Media announced a slate of six meteorologists who would make up the team reporting for the channel, joining from other local TV stations.

The channel is overseen by Fox News Media CEO Suzanne Scott and executive Sharri Berg.

News of the launch sparked discussion on how the channel will cover climate change, an issue their sister channel Fox News has often dismissed. Regarding how the issue of climate change will be addressed on the new network, Berg stated in an interview that "...climate change is part of our lives. It's how we live. It's not going to be ignored."

On August 18, 2021, Berg announced that Fox Weather would add three correspondents and five multimedia journalists to the team.

On September 1, 2021, Fox Weather released their first promo and announced that they would be launching in October. The launch date was later announced for October 25.

On October 18, 2021, Berg announced that Fox Weather would add four additional meteorologists and a multimedia journalist to the team.

The network was also added as an over-the-air digital subchannel at the start of 2022 in markets served by the network's owned-and-operated stations group, presumably with local insertion allowing local forecasts and severe weather coverage. A weekend morning simulcast of the channel airs on Fox Business from 6 to 8 a.m. ET, which started on December 4.

YouTube TV added Fox Weather on February 2, 2022, becoming the first weather-focused channel to air on the OTT service. On February 8, Berg announced that Fox Weather had also been added to the Amazon News and The Roku Channel OTT services, and would be added to Xumo and FuboTV later in February. Berg also announced that, in addition to its addition to over-the-air digital subchannels, Fox Weather content would be simulcast for 1–2 hours daily on Fox Television Stations' MyNetworkTV and independent stations.

On March 14, 2022, Berg announced that Fox Weather had hired Bryan Norcross as its hurricane specialist.

On April 12, 2022, Fox Weather announced that it has unveiled a Ford F-250 truck called the "Fox Weather Beast."

On May 2, 2022, Fox Weather debuted an hourly update podcast/report "Fox Weather Update." Weather updates and rolling coverage are also a part of the hourly loop of streaming/SiriusXM station Fox News Headlines 24/7.

On December 7, 2022, Fox News Audio and TuneIn, the live-streaming service announced their long partnership which includes Fox Weather for audio streaming.

On July 6, 2023, Berg announced that Fox Weather had hired Bob Van Dillen as on-air host. He started his role on July 10, 2023.

On August 23, 2023, Fox Weather was added to Samsung TV Plus and Cox.

On November 29, 2023, Fox Weather was added to Sling Freestream and Dish Network.

In August 2024, Fox Weather added long-time The Weather Channel personality Mike Seidel as a meteorologist and storm specialist. He started covering Hurricane Debby.

On August 1, 2024, Fox Weather was added to Pluto TV.

In February 2025, Fox Weather launched a premium ad-free subscription plan.

== Location and team ==
The channel's headquarters is at Fox News Media's office and draws on their existing meteorologists across US stations as well as dedicated meteorologists for the channel.

=== Notable current on-air staff ===
- Stephen Morgan – anchor (formerly of KRIV and KRBK)
- Bryan Norcross – tropical storm and hurricane specialist (formerly of WTVJ, WFOR-TV, The Weather Channel, and WPLG)
- Mike Seidel – meteorologist and storm specialist (formerly of The Weather Channel)
- Bob Van Dillen – anchor (formerly of HLN)

== Programming ==
=== Live ===
Currently, Fox Weather's schedule consists of the following programs:

- Fox Weather First (Weekdays 5-8 AM ET; 5-6 AM ET simulcast on Fox Business)
- Weather Command (Weekdays 8 AM-12 PM ET)
- America's Weather Center (Weekdays 12-3 PM ET)
- Fox Weather Now (Weekdays 3-6 PM ET)
- Fox Weather Live (Weeknights 6-9 PM ET)
- Weather Command Weekend (Weekends 6 AM-12 PM ET; 6-9 AM ET simulcast on Fox Business)
- Fox Weather Live Weekend (Weekends 12-8 PM ET)
- Fox Weather @ Night (Sun 8 PM - 12 AM ET, Mon - Thu 9 PM-5 AM ET)

=== Pre-recorded ===
- PARK'd (Weekends 8 PM-6 AM ET; from Fox Nation)

== Affiliates ==
City of license / Market	Station	Virtual channel	Primary affiliation (on main channel)	Notes
Los Angeles	KTTV	11.2	Fox	Full simulcast
Oakland - San Jose - San Francisco	KTVU	2.2	Fox	Full simulcast
Houston	KRIV	26.3	Fox	Full simulcast
New York City	WNYW	5.3	Fox	Full simulcast
Tacoma - Seattle	KCPQ	13.5	Fox	Full simulcast
Chicago	WFLD	32.5	Fox	Full simulcast
Washington D.C.	WDCA	20.4	MyNetworkTV	Full simulcast
Dallas - Fort Worth	KDFI	27.6	MyNetworkTV	Full simulcast
Phoenix	KSAZ-TV	10.5	Fox	Full simulcast
Milwaukee	WITI	6.4	Fox	Full simulcast
Minneapolis - St. Paul	KMSP-TV	9.7	Fox	Full simulcast
Orlando - Daytona Beach - Melbourne	WOFL	35.3	Fox	Full simulcast
Tampa - St. Petersburg	WTVT	13.6	Fox	Full simulcast
Austin	KTBC	7.6	Fox	Full simulcast
Atlanta	WAGA	5.6	Fox	Full simulcast
Philadelphia	WTXF-TV	29.5	Fox	Full simulcast
Detroit	WJBK	2.6	Fox	Full simulcast
Gainesville - Ocala	WOGX	51.5	Fox	Full simulcast
San Antonio	KCWX (Note: Only Fox Weather affiliate on a non-O&O Fox station.)	2.3	MyNetworkTV	Full simulcast

== See also ==
- NBC Weather Plus
- The Weather Channel
