= WOGX =

Television station in Ocala, Florida

Semi-satellite of WOFL, Orlando, Florida
- Ocala–Gainesville, Florida; United States
- City: Ocala, Florida
- Channels: Digital: 31 (UHF); Virtual: 51
- Branding: Fox 51 WOGX; Fox 51 News

Programming
- Affiliations: 51.1: Fox; for others, see § Subchannels

Ownership
- Owner: Fox Television Stations, LLC
- Sister stations: WOFL, WRBW

History
- First air date: November 1, 1983
- Former call signs: WBSP-TV (1983–1987)
- Former channel numbers: Analog: 51 (UHF, 1983–2009)
- Former affiliations: Independent (1983–1991)
- Call sign meaning: "Ocala–Gainesville" plus an X to conform to other call signs of 1980s owner Wabash Valley Broadcasting

Technical information
- Licensing authority: FCC
- Facility ID: 70651
- ERP: 500 kW
- HAAT: 259 m (850 ft)
- Transmitter coordinates: 29°21′33.2″N 82°19′42.6″W

Links
- Public license information: Public file; LMS
- Website: www.wogx.com

WOGX (channel 51) is a television station licensed to Ocala, Florida, United States, serving the Gainesville area as a Fox network outlet. Owned and operated by the network's Fox Television Stations division, the station maintains an advertising sales office on Northwest 53rd Avenue in Gainesville and a transmitter in Marion County, between Williston and Fairfield. It is considered a semi-satellite of WOFL (channel 35) in Orlando, which handles management and technical services and whose newscasts it simulcasts. Although Ocala is part of the Orlando television market, WOGX is assigned by Nielsen to the Gainesville market.

Efforts to build channel 51 in Ocala dated to the late 1960s, and for most of the 1970s, there was a serious effort to construct a station to be known as "WOCA". When that attempt fizzled after the Federal Communications Commission ruled they had spent too much time building the station, two interested parties formed Big Sun Television, which won the construction permit and put WBSP-TV on the air in October 1983. It operated as a conventional independent station with a range of movies and syndicated programs. Big Sun sold the station in 1986 to Indiana-based Wabash Valley Broadcasting, which changed the call sign to WOGX the next year and upgraded programming. Channel 51 joined the Fox network in May 1991, bringing the network to Gainesville for the first time.

The Meredith Corporation, then-owner of WOFL, bought WOGX-TV from Wabash Valley Broadcasting in January 1996 and immediately moved to consolidate operating functions with WOFL. The station debuted a local newscast in 1998, including an edition only seen in the Ocala–Gainesville market, though the latter lasted less than a year. WOFL and WOGX were traded to Fox Television Stations in 2002.

== Channel 51 in Ocala: Prehistory ==
The first group to express interest in building channel 51 in Ocala was Hubbard Broadcasting, owner of the to-be-built WTOG in St. Petersburg, who applied in March 1967 to construct the station. Hubbard intended for the Ocala station to join one on channel 20 in Fort Myers as a rebroadcaster.

Six years later, Marion Communications began preparing plans for channel 51. The station, dubbed WOCL in the planning stages, would be located in nearby Orange Lake, broadcasting from a 932-foot (284 m) tower. The tower location was contested; the advisory board for the Gainesville Airport lodged a protest in December 1973, stating it was on a direct air route from Ocala to Gainesville, but the Federal Aviation Administration (FAA) approved the proposed tower in September 1974. Because of the months-long delay in approval of the tower, activity on the station languished as the backers ran into a poor economy and struggled to gain financing amid high interest rates. However, the firm now had a construction permit and the call sign WOCA, as the group made a typo on a Federal Communications Commission (FCC) form. Another issue arose: while the FCC approved a taller tower, the FAA delayed approval six months while it sought to determine that the higher mast would not conflict with naval bomber runs to and from Lake George and the nearby Interstate 75. This delay caused Marion Communications to lose its funding, forcing it to sell the WOCA-TV construction permit to Gator Broadcasting Corporation. Gator ran into another issue: the CBS and NBC networks refused to give the group an affiliation for the Gainesville area.

By 1979, WOCA-TV still only existed on paper, and factions were forming as Gator Broadcasting continued to apply for extensions. In mid-1979, congressman Bill Chappell sided with other investors—organized as WOCA Inc.—and called on the FCC to reconsider granting another extension to Gator, telling the commission, "Should the Commission continue to grant extensions to Gator Broadcasting, without any movement toward construction on their part, this would only serve to deny my constituents in Marion County a UHF-TV outlet." Facing pressure to get on with construction, Gator Broadcasting announced that it was pouring the foundation for the tower at the Orange Lake site. The company's plans continued to wither as a network affiliation was not forthcoming. The station opted to switch from the tall tower at Orange Lake to a 199-foot (61 m) site in central Ocala in 1980, applying for a modification of the construction permit. The modification was denied; the FCC canceled the permit held by Gator Broadcasting in August 1980 because the facility was not built in a timely manner. Gator appealed, but the FCC upheld the dismissal on a 5–2 vote the next month. The commission's staff reported that, despite two years of extensions, "the most prominent facility completed within the studio building appears to be a toilet".

== Standalone history ==
=== WBSP-TV: Big Sun TV ===
Two investors who had been involved with the 1979 WOCA Inc. company, Randolph Tucker and Randall Schrader, formed a new firm in October 1980 with the intention of seeking a new channel 51 permit. Their firm, Big Sun Television, formally filed with the FCC on November 11. This application was granted on October 26, 1981. Officials of Big Sun Television slated to run WBSP-TV as an independent station with family-oriented programs. Meanwhile, the principals—seeking to avoid the money shortages that had doomed WOCA-TV—offered stock in Big Sun Television to the public. Among them was actor Patrick O'Neal, an Ocala native. The stock sale turned out to be unsuccessful, leaving the investors to start the station with mostly their own money. The original studio site on Fort King Street was later found to be unsuitable, and as it was being sold, Big Sun TV vacated it in June 1983.

WBSP-TV began broadcasting from studios on SW 37th Avenue on October 31, 1983, with its first full day on the air being the next day, November 1. The new station cost the investors in Big Sun Television $2.7 million to construct. It had unsuccessfully sought CBS affiliation before launch, but CBS was satisfied with its existing area coverage from WJXT in Jacksonville.

=== WOGX: Wabash Valley Broadcasting ownership ===
Wabash Valley Broadcasting of Terre Haute, Indiana, agreed to acquire WBSP-TV from Big Sun Television in May 1986. The purchase and that of WFTX-TV in Cape Coral, Florida, serving Fort Myers, marked the expansion of the Hulman family's broadcasting interests into Florida. In April 1987, coinciding with upgrades in studio equipment and programming, Wabash Valley changed the call sign to WOGX; the new designation conformed with other stations ending in X owned by the firm. With the upgrades, WOGX became just one of three independent stations to air the popular syndicated game shows Wheel of Fortune and Jeopardy!. At one time, George Steinbrenner, the owner of the New York Yankees as well as the local Kinsman Stud Farm, considered buying the station from Wabash Valley but opted not to do so.

During Wabash Valley's ownership, a second independent station made an incursion into the Ocala–Gainesville area. As early as 1983, a locally owned low-power TV station in Crystal River, W49AI, was on air, rebroadcasting Orlando's WOFL to a small area in Citrus County. The Meredith Corporation, owner of WOFL, began pushing in 1986 to build channel 64, licensed to Inverness, as a rebroadcaster of WOFL under the proposed call sign WIFL. Channel 51, both as WBSP and later as WOGX, fought the proposed station, as did the FCC's own Mass Media Bureau, which noted that multiple other applicants for the channel had sought full-service stations, not repeaters. In 1989, it appealed the FCC's award of a construction permit to the full commission.

As the Fox network grew in the late 1980s and early 1990s, its availability was spotty in north-central Florida. While Ocala had WOFL—also a Fox affiliate—on its cable lineup, there was no Fox affiliate on the Cox Cable system in Gainesville. Cox had planned to bring Fox into the area by adding a station whose construction was planned: WFXU (channel 57) in Live Oak, which was intended to rebroadcast WTLH, the Fox affiliate for the Tallahassee area. However, the delivery of its transmitter was delayed. Fox reviewed an application from WOGX for affiliation with the network and granted approval. Channel 51 joined Fox on May 30, 1991. In its first sweeps period with Fox, the station ranked as the number-one Fox affiliate in the nation in viewers 25–54.

== Ownership with WOFL ==
In March 1995, Wabash Valley announced it had agreed to sell WOGX to Meredith, in part on assurances that it would let it operate rather than convert it to merely repeat WOFL; the station was valued at $14.5 million in the deal, which according to John Newcomb of Wabash Valley Broadcasting was "more money than we thought it was worth to us". When the sale took effect on January 1, 1996, WOFL's general manager assumed responsibility for WOGX, and the company set up data links between the two stations. Master control for WOGX was handled at WOFL's studios in Lake Mary, a suburb of Orlando. Of 30 jobs in Ocala, eight to nine were eliminated, and another 11 were transferred to Lake Mary. The combination added 94,000 Gainesville-area homes to WOFL's viewing area.

After the consolidation, Meredith expressed some interest in starting a local newscast for the station, though at the time not even WOFL produced news. Meredith's plans to start a news operation for WOFL were delayed by its 1997 acquisition of Orlando's WCPX-TV; Meredith chose to keep WOFL and WOGX and trade away WCPX. Under these plans, WOFL would air a 10 p.m. newscast, but WOGX would have an additional 6 p.m. news program. This came to pass when WOFL began airing newscasts on March 1, 1998. Five reporters and two photographers were assigned to cover the Gainesville and Ocala areas for the newscasts, which were presented from Orlando. The early newscast was discontinued after nine months because it represented a decline in ratings over the entertainment programming it replaced and general manager Tom Calato found the news audience did not match the 18–49 target demographic for the station.

Meredith traded WOFL and WOGX to Fox Television Stations, the owned-and-operated stations division of the network, in 2002, receiving KPTV in Portland, Oregon, in exchange. In 2007, the station began broadcasting programming in high definition.

== Technical information ==
=== Subchannels ===
WOGX's transmitter is located in Marion County, between Williston and Fairfield. The station's signal is multiplexed:

Subchannels of WOGX
Subchannel	Res.	Short name	Programming
51.1	720p	WOGX-DT	Fox
51.2	480i	Movies!	Movies!
51.3	480i	ion-tv	Ion (4:3)
51.4	480i	Catchy	Catchy Comedy
51.5	480i	Fox WX	Fox Weather

=== Analog-to-digital conversion ===
WOGX began airing a digital signal on August 1, 2002. It ended regular programming on its analog signal, over UHF channel 51, on June 12, 2009, the official digital television transition date for full-power stations. The station's digital signal remained on its pre-transition UHF channel 31.
