= Changing Seas =

2009 American television series

- Narrated by: Craig Sechler, Season 7-17 and Peter Thomas, Seasons 1-6
- Opening theme: Composed by Steve Pfister from Pacific Mist Music
- Country of origin: United States
- No. of seasons: 17
- No. of episodes: 68

Production
- Running time: 26.42 minutes
- Production company: South Florida PBS/WPBT

Original release
- Release: 2009 – present

Changing Seas is a public television series produced by South Florida PBS (WPBT2-WXEL) in Miami, Florida, and narrated by announcers Craig Sechler and Peter Thomas.

The series accompanies oceanographers and other experts as they seek out new information about the oceans and shedding light on how human activities are threatening ocean resources.

== Season 1 (2009) ==
Changing Seas is a public television series produced by South Florida PBS in Miami, Florida. Since 2009, when its first season was released, the series has taken viewers on an exciting adventure to the heart of our liquid planet. In 2025, the show has released its 17th Season.

The first season of Changing Seas from 2009 follows scientists and explorers as they study the ocean and uncover new information that could lead to scientific breakthroughs. The season includes episodes about:

- The Goliath Grouper: The comeback of the giant Goliath Grouper in Florida, despite the rapid disappearance of large fish from the world's oceans
- Aquarius: Scientists spend ten days living and working at the world's only underwater laboratory, Aquarius, to study the effects of ocean acidification on local reef ecosystems
- Deep sea corals: The magnificent deep sea corals that grow off Florida's Atlantic coast, reaching heights of up to 300 feet
- Aquaculture: The growing demand for fresh seafood has pushed wild stocks to the brink, and aquaculture is one alternative to wild-caught fish
- Salt marshes: Researchers study one of America's iconic landscapes
- Deep-sea submersible Alvin: Upgrades to the Alvin allow it to go deeper than ever before
- Juvenile tarpon and snook: Scientists study and restore their habitat in Florida
- Mangroves and seagrasses: Experts work to restore Florida's important mangroves and seagrasses

No. overall	No. in season	Title
1	1	"Super Grouper"
At a time when large fish are rapidly disappearing from the world’s oceans, the giant Goliath Grouper is making a comeback in Florida.
2	2	"Mission to Inner Space"
Scientists spend ten days below the sea at the world’s only underwater laboratory “Aquarius,” to study the effects of ocean acidification on local reef ecosystems.
3	3	"Corals of the Deep"
In the deep waters off Florida’s Atlantic coast grow magnificent structures, capable of reaching 300 feet in height. These are the corals of the deep sea.
4	4	"Farming the Sea"
An ever-growing demand for fresh seafood has pushed wild stocks around the world to the brink. Aquaculture is one alternative to wild-caught fish.

== Season 2 (2010) ==
No. overall	No. in season	Title
5	1	"No Fish Left Uncounted"
A team of research divers counts fish in Dry Tortugas National Park to evaluate if marine protected areas are helping the regional ecosystem rebound from years of overfishing and environmental change.
6	2	"Sentinels of the Seas"
Florida’s bottlenose dolphins are showing disturbing signs of immune system dysfunction and disease, which may be linked to containment exposure.
7	3	"Seagrasses and Mangroves"
Seagrasses and mangroves are in decline globally, threatening an ecosystem collapse from the bottom of the food chain all the way to the top.
8	4	"Sinking the Vandenberg"
Near Key West lies the world’s second largest intentionally sunk shipwreck, the USNS General Hoyt S. Vandenberg. This artificial reef is now attracting fish, fishermen and divers.

== Season 3 (2011) ==
No. overall	No. in season	Title
9	1	"Alien Invaders"
In the waters of the western Atlantic and Caribbean, a voracious alien predator has taken hold. Native to the Indo-Pacific, the invasive lionfish is a major threat to biodiversity.
10	2	"Reef Revival"
In the emerging science of coral reef restoration, experts are discovering naturally occurring mechanisms that promote coral growth and restore ecological balance in these gardens of the sea.
11	3	"Prescription: Oceans"
In Florida, scientists are testing sea sponges for their potential anti-cancer properties. These and other marine invertebrates may hold the key to unlocking the secrets of our own biology.
12	4	"After the Spill"
The impact of the catastrophic oil spill in the Gulf of Mexico is far from over. Oceanographers continue to study the long-term effects this disaster might have on marine ecosystems.

== Season 4 (2012) ==
No. overall	No. in season	Title
13	1	"Tracking Tigers"
Tiger sharks are the ultimate apex predators. Scientists use satellite tags and DNA forensic tools to better understand the migrations of this magnificent species and to investigate the impacts of the world shark fin trade.
14	2	"Mysterious Microbes"
On coral reefs, microorganisms are copious creatures. Throughout Florida, scientists painstakingly work to identify key players within this microbial community and directly link a devastating coral disease to a human pathogen.
15	3	"Grouper Moon"
During winter full moons, Nassau Grouper gather in large numbers to spawn. Most of the known spawning sites have been fished out, but the Cayman Islands are home to the last great reproductive population of this endangered species.
16	5	"Coastal Carnivores"
Scientists studying the coastal Everglades have made some perplexing discoveries. Bull sharks are living upstream where alligators should thrive, and gators are swimming out to the ocean to feed. Co-production with Symbio Studios.

== Season 5 (2013) ==
No. overall	No. in season	Title
17	1	"Coral Hybrids"
While Elkhorn and Staghorn corals have undergone a drastic decline in the Caribbean, their hybrid, “Fused Staghorn,” is increasing in numbers in parts of the region. Experts are studying the animals to see if the hybrid might be better equipped to deal with environmental stressors than its parents.
18	2	"Sunken Stories"
In the Florida Keys, divers from around the country learn how to map shipwrecks and apply their skills on a mysterious 19th century slave ship. When diving isn’t possible, professional explorers use high-tech tools to scan objects buried beneath the seafloor.
19	3	"Creatures of the Deep"
In the cold, deep waters of the Gulf of Mexico, little-known animals spend their entire lives far removed from our human world. Until now, little research has been conducted on these creatures of the deep, keeping much of their lives a mystery.
20	4	"Reefs of Rangiroa"
Scientists with the Global Reef Expedition are on a mission to study remote coral reefs around the world. While in French Polynesia, experts conduct extensive habitat mapping and assess the health of reefs to compare and contrast the resilience of reef systems over a large geographical area. A co-production with Khaled bin Sultan Living Ocean Foundation.

== Season 6 (2014) ==
No. overall	No. in season	Title
21	1	"Living Fossils"
In the deep, dark waters off the coast of Honduras, strange flowerlike animals flourish. These sea lilies and feather stars, known as crinoids, have been in various forms since before the age of dinosaurs. Now experts descend into the deep to study the animals from a submersible.
22	2	"Biggest Fish in the Sea"
Each summer, the world’s largest known aggregation of whale sharks occurs just off the coast of Cancun, Mexico. Hundreds of these gentle giants come to the area to feed on plankton, giving experts the opportunity to learn more about the largest fish in the sea.
23	3	"Galapagos: Windows into the Future]"
The unique oceanic conditions of the Galápagos Islands serve as a perfect natural laboratory to study how climate change may impact corals in the future. Scientists spend a month in the archipelago to conduct research as part of the Global Reef Expedition. A co-production with Khaled bin Sultan Living Ocean Foundation.
24	4	"Saving Sawfish"
The strange, prehistoric-looking Smalltooth Sawfish were once coveted by anglers as popular trophy fish. But habitat loss and overfishing have greatly reduced the animals’ range and landed them on the endangered species list. Now, scientists are conducting research to save the species.

== Season 7 (2015) ==
No. overall	No. in season	Title
25	1	"Sea Turtles: The Lost Years"
After sea turtle hatchlings emerge from their nests, they vanish into the sea. Until recently, their journey was largely shrouded in mystery. Now, as technology advances, researchers are beginning to understand where turtles go during their so-called “lost years.”
26	2	"Grand Cayman's Famous Stingrays"
Each year, thousands of tourists interact with the tame southern stingrays that congregate in the shallow waters of Grand Cayman’s North Sound. Famous marine artist and scientist Dr. Guy Harvey has assembled a research team to study what impact the ecotourism might have on the wild fish.
27	3	"Billfish: Battle on the Line?"
The unique oceanographic conditions of the eastern tropical Pacific make the area one of the best spots in the world for big game anglers to hook billfish. But intense pressures from commercial fishing operations have taken their toll on the numbers of sailfish and marlin in the region. Researchers are studying the animals to provide the data necessary to protect the fish populations from further decline.
28	4	"The Secret Sex Life of Fish"
Most people are familiar with the pretty tropical fish found in aquariums, but few realize that some of these animals are capable of changing sex. Discover the unique ways of how some fish species do this and why they likely evolved this way.

== Season 8 (2016) ==
No. overall	No. in season	Title
29	1	"Sponges: Oldest Creatures in the Sea?"
Until recently there was scientific consensus that sponges were the first animals to branch off the “Animal Tree of Life,” a kind of family tree for all living and extinct animals on earth. But recent DNA research has cast doubt on that theory, with some scientists suggesting that ctenophores, also known as comb jellies, are an older lineage.
30	2	"Manatees: Conserving a Marine Mammal"
Every winter, hundreds of manatees aggregate at Crystal River, Florida, attracted by the warmer, spring-fed clear waters. This sanctuary is also a treasure for scientists, who take advantage of these manatee gatherings to study them. From decades of visual ID studies to the most cutting-edge DNA research, experts hope that science will help conserve this beloved marine mammal.
31	3	"Maug's Caldera: A Natural Laboratory"
In the remote Pacific, the islands of Maug rise out of the sea. Formed by an ancient volcano, shallow hydrothermal vents are found close to coral reefs inside the submerged caldera. These vents emit levels of CO2 that can be expected in the world’s oceans by the end of the century, making these waters a natural laboratory for scientists studying the impacts of ocean acidification on coral reefs. Co-produced with Open Boat Films.
32	4	"Beneath the Bridge"
The Blue Heron Bridge in Riviera Beach, Florida, is known as one of the best shore dives in the United States. What appears as an unlikely dive site at first is home to a rich variety of marine life, ranging from tiny nudibranchs to manta rays. Underwater photographers are documenting what lives beneath the bridge, and a scientist is studying how two species of octopus co-exist there.

== Season 9 (2017) ==
No. overall	No. in season	Title
33	1	"The Future of Seafood"
To feed a booming world population, more fish will need to be farmed in the future. One way to increase fish production in a sustainable way is to move aquaculture operations offshore – where there is plenty of space and strong currents avoid polluting sensitive ecosystems.
34	2	"Toxic Algae: Complex Sources and Solutions"
Putrid mats of blue green algae are wreaking havoc on Florida’s shorelines. Scientists think water pollution is to blame, and if something isn’t done about it there could be irreparable damage to the environment, the local economy and people’s health.
35	3	"The Fate of Carbon"
For millennia, the exchange of CO2 between the oceans and atmosphere has been in balance. Now, with more anthropogenic carbon dioxide in the atmosphere, the oceans are taking up more CO2 as well. This additional CO2 is negatively impacting sensitive ecosystems, making scientists worry how these changes will affect the way carbon is cycled through the seas.
36	4	"Majestic Mantas"
Mexico’s remote Revillagigedo Archipelago is a hotspot for oceanic mantas. Scientists use photo ID techniques and acoustic tags to study these mysterious fish. They are also researching if the filter-feeding rays are impacted negatively by microplastics – tiny pieces of toxic trash that float in the ocean.

== Season 10 (2018) ==
No. overall	No. in season	Title
37	1	"Dolphins: Breaking the Code"
Dr. Denise Herzing has dedicated her career to studying wild Atlantic spotted dolphins in the Bahamas. She researches the animals’ social structure, behaviors and communication. Now modern technology is making it possible to correlate the dolphins’ sounds and behavior, bringing experts closer to decoding dolphin communication.
38	2	"Cryptic Critters"
On a shipwreck near Key West lives a tiny potential new threat. Researchers want to know where this new species came from, and whether its sudden appearance spells disaster for the delicate coral reef ecosystem in the Florida Keys.
39	3	"Lords of the Wetlands"
While American crocodiles are recovering in parts of their range, their future looks bleak in Jamaica. Habitat loss and poaching have led to a drastic decline in the population. Dedicated experts are working to save the species through research, education, and conservation initiatives.
40	4	"Fishing the Flats for Science"
Flats fishing is popular with recreational anglers in the Caribbean and the Florida Keys. But until recently, little was known about tarpon, bonefish and permit – the species most coveted by sports fishermen. Now scientists are studying the fish to better understand their movements, habitat, and spawning behaviors.

== Season 11 (2019) ==
No. overall	No. in season	Title
41	1	"The Cordell Bank: A National Treasure"
California’s north-central coast is famous for its natural splendor. Only fifty miles northwest of San Francisco’s Golden Gate Bridge lies the Cordell Bank, a magical underwater island few people have ever heard of. Protected inside a National Marine Sanctuary, this oasis is an ecological hot spot for marine life - attracting birds, sea turtles and marine mammals from thousands of miles away.
42	2	"Toxic Waters"
Harmful algal blooms come in many forms, from toxic outbreaks impacting the health of animals and humans, to non-toxic but expansive sargassum mats devastating local economies and tourism. Scientists are working to understand what causes these blooms, how they impact us, and how we can stop them.
43	3	"Corals in Crisis"
Stony Coral Tissue Loss Disease is devastating Florida’s fragile coral reef ecosystem. But all hope is not lost. Dedicated scientists are working hard to find the cause of the disease, treat the ill and restore these cities of the sea to their former glory.
44	4	"Mystery of the Humpback Whale Song"
Each winter, a population of humpback whales migrates to its breeding grounds in the Hawaiian Islands. It is here that male humpbacks perform their elaborate and haunting song. Experts are studying the purpose of this song and what it might tell them about the animals’ overall fitness.

== Season 12 (2020) ==
No. overall	No. in season	Title
45	1	"Florida's Blue Holes: Oases in the Sea"
Blue holes scattered throughout the Gulf of Mexico inspire a team of exploration scientists and divers who set out to uncover the mysteries of what makes them ecological oases.
46	2	"A Decade After Deepwater"
Ten years after the Deepwater Horizon oil rig disaster, scientists are still studying its devastating impacts on the Gulf of Mexico. Now they are using lessons learned to prepare for the next big spill.
47	3	"Peru's Desert Penguins"
Along Peru’s barren coastline seabirds reign. Among them is the adorable Humboldt penguin, which builds its nests in the guano of other birds. Scientists monitor local penguin populations and study the animals’ interactions with fisheries.
48	4	"American Samoa's Resilient Coral Reefs"
American Samoa is home to some of the largest corals on record. Reefs in this remote island paradise are thriving, while corals elsewhere are in serious decline. Scientists study what makes these corals more resilient than others in the wake of local and global stressors.

== Season 13 (2021) ==
No. overall	No. in season	Title
49	1	"Recreational Shark Fishing: Collaborating for Conservation"
Shore-based, catch and release shark fishing is a popular past time in Florida. But is it having a negative impact on sensitive shark populations? Scientists have teamed up with anglers to study the survival rates of the fish and conduct outreach on best practices.
50	2	"At the Waters Edge: The Salt Marsh"
Along scenic coastlines in the South, waves of mesmerizing green and golden grass stretch to the horizon. This is the salt marsh - a part liquid, part solid landscape that is teeming with life. How do scientists study the salt marsh? And how resilient is it to climate change?
51	3	"Alvin: Pioneer of the Deep"
The deep-sea submersible Alvin has brought explorers to extraordinary places for more than 50 years. Now, as Alvin is poised to continue its revolutionary scientific work, a new set of upgrades will take it deeper than ever before. A co-production with Woods Hole Oceanographic Institution.
52	4	"Habitats: The Key to Florida's Fisheries"
Tarpon and snook are two of Florida’s most iconic game fish. Both species rely on mangrove creeks and ponds when they are juveniles. With half of the state’s mangroves lost to development, scientists employ creative solutions to restore and reconnect some of these important habitats to secure the future of the fisheries.

== Season 14 (2022) ==
No. overall	No. in season	Title
53	1	"Vanishing Whales"
The humpback whale population that migrates between Hawaiʻi and Alaska is considered a conservation success story. When sightings of the animals suddenly dropped, people became concerned. Scientists in both locations are trying to understand what happened to the whales and why.
54	2	"Humpback Health"
How does the body size and overall health of humpback whales change across their migratory cycle? A team of researchers studying the animals, which spend part of the year feeding in Alaska and a few months fasting while in their Hawaiian breeding grounds, is making remarkable discoveries.
55	3	"Kelp: Hidden Treasure of the Salish Sea"
The kelp forests of the Puget Sound have long played an essential role in the local ecosystem as a habitat and food source. Today, this foundational species is in decline, but resource managers, scientists, tribal citizens, and advocates are working together to solve the mysteries of conserving and restoring kelp forests.
56	4	"Saving Florida's Starving Manatees"
Florida’s iconic sea cows are dying in record numbers. Years of declining seagrass beds have eliminated one of the gentle giants’ primary food sources. Now wildlife managers have taken the unprecedented step of feeding the animals, while scientists are in a race against time to restore the lost seagrass.

== Season 15 (2023) ==
No. overall	No. in season	Title
57	1	"Mollusks: More than a Shell"
Seashells, with their beautiful shapes and colors, have inspired humans since the dawn of time. Equally fascinating are the animals which make them, and their unique place in the web of life.
58	2	"Sharks in Belize: Jaguars of the Sea"
Catching and tagging sharks along the Belize Barrier Reef, local fishers leverage their generational knowledge to help marine scientists and fisheries managers keep shark populations healthy for all.
59	3	"Bermuda: Life at Ocean's Edge"
As the shipwreck capital of the world, Bermuda is known for its treacherous reefs. But these uniquely resilient corals may offer clues to protecting the islands from the accelerating impacts of a changing climate.
60	4	"Life in the Dark: The Polar Night"
At the northernmost research station in the world, scientists brave the cold and darkness to solve an ocean mystery. They are trying to understand how some of the tiniest animals survive at a time of year when their main food source is not available.

== Season 16 (2024) ==
No. overall	No. in season	Title
61	1	"Ancient Adriatic: Croatia's Sunken History"
Archaeologists and conservators along Croatia’s Dalmatian Coast meticulously uncover and document a 2000-year-old Roman ship, providing invaluable insights into the region's maritime history and cultural heritage.
62	2	"Eagle Rays: Soaring on Spotted Wings"
Relatively little is known about the endangered whitespotted eagle ray’s ecology and life history. Now Florida scientists are using cutting-edge technology to gain deeper insight into the movement and diet of this elegant fish.
63	3	"Maui Aloha ʻĀina: From Mauka to Makai"
Hawaiians draw upon ancient wisdom to revive Maui’s traditional watersheds from the mountains to the sea. Even amidst profound loss in the wake of recent wildfires, these resilient islanders are committed to healing their island home.
64	4	"California Sea Otters: Life on the Edge"
The threatened southern sea otter is a voracious predator that needs to eat 25% of its body weight a day to survive. Dedicated experts study this endearing marine weasel to ensure its longtime survival along California’s coast.

== Season 17 (2025) ==
No. overall	No. in season	Title
65	1	"Costa Rica's Surfing Paradise"
In Costa Rica’s Playa Hermosa, a passionate coastal community unites to protect their iconic surf break, restore vital habitats, and safeguard the sea turtles that nest along their shores.
66	2	"Whales in a Plastic Ocean"
Floating plastic trash impacts even remote locations, including the Portuguese island of Madeira. Researchers study the effects these plastics are having on the health of marine mammals that frequent local waters.
67	3	"Mystery of the Spinning Fish"
A group of multidisciplinary scientists is trying to piece together what caused more than 80 species of fish to spin in the Florida Keys in the winter and spring of 2023/24.
68	4	"The Elephant Seals of Año Nuevo"
At Año Nuevo State Park, a dedicated team of scientists from the University of California Santa Cruz collaborates with a thriving colony of elephant seals to better understand their life cycles and ocean health.

== Awards ==
Year	Award/Festival	Category	Episode	Result	Notes
2025	NATAS Suncoast Chapter Regional Emmy Awards	Environment/Science	California Sea Otters: Ecosystem Engineers	Won	
2025	NATAS Suncoast Chapter Regional Emmy Awards	Environment/Science	Costa Rica’s Surfing Paradise	Won	
2025	NATAS Suncoast Chapter Regional Emmy Awards	Environment/Science	Whales in a Plastic Ocean	Won	
2025	NATAS Suncoast Chapter Regional Emmy Awards	Environment/Science	Mystery of the Spinning Fish	Won	
2025	NATAS Suncoast Chapter Regional Emmy Awards	Environment/Science	The Elephant Seals of Año Nuevo	Won	
2025	Nature Without Borders Film Festival	Endangered Species	California Sea Otters: Life on the Edge	Won	Won Outstanding Excellence Award
2025	Nature Without Borders Film Festival	Marine Life and Oceans	Eagle Rays: Soaring on Spotted Wings	Won	Won Outstanding Excellence Award
2025	Nature Without Borders Film Festival	Land and Water Management	Maui Aloha ʻĀina: From Mauka to Makai	Won	Won Outstanding Excellence Award
2025	Tulum WE Film Festival	Research Exploration Short Film	Alvin: Pioneer of the Deep	Won	
2025	Tulum WE Film Festival	Environment Conservation Short Film	Kelp: Hidden Treasure of the Salish Sea	Won	
2025	Tulum WE Film Festival	Wildlife Conservation Short Film	Sharks in Belize: Jaguars of the Sea	Won	
2025	Tulum WE Film Festival	Climate Change Short Film	Bermuda: Life at Ocean’s Edge	Won	
2025	#LabMeCrazy! Science Film Festival	TV Production	Maui Aloha ʻĀina: From Mauka to Makai	Finalist	
2025	S.O.F.A Film Festival	Wildlife (Endangered, All Species)	California Sea Otters: Life on the Edge	Won	Won Best Short
2024	NATAS Suncoast Chapter Regional Emmy Awards	Environment/Science	Ancient Adriatic: Croatia’s Sunken History	Nominated	
2024	NATAS Suncoast Chapter Regional Emmy Awards	Environment/Science	Eagle Rays: Soaring on Spotted Wings	Nominated	
2024	Nature Without Borders Film Festival	Ocean Life Documentaries	Mollusks: More than a Shell	Won	Won Outstanding Excellence Award
2024	Nature Without Borders Film Festival	Ocean Life Documentaries	Sharks in Belize: Jaguars of the Sea	Won	Won Outstanding Excellence Award
2024	Nature Without Borders Film Festival	Ocean Life Documentaries	Life in the Dark: The Polar Night	Won	Won Outstanding Excellence Award
2024	Nature Without Borders Film Festival	Environmental	Bermuda: Life at Ocean's Edge	Won	Won Outstanding Excellence Award
2024	CMS VATAVARAN International Film Festival	International - Environment Conservation	Kelp: Hidden Treasure of the Salish Sea	Nominated	
2024	#LabMeCrazy! Science Film Festival	TV Production	Humpback Health	Finalist	
2024	Cinema Verde International Environmental Film and Arts Festival	Short	Bermuda: Life at Ocean’s Edge	Honorable Mention	
2024	Cinema Verde International Environmental Film and Arts Festival	Short	Sharks in Belize: Jaguars of the Sea	Honorable Mention	
2023	Nature Without Borders Film Festival	Environmental	Saving Florida's Starving Manatees	Won	Won Domestic Best of Festival Award
2023	Nature Without Borders Film Festival	Ocean Life Documentaries	Vanishing Whales	Won	Won Outstanding Excellence Award
2023	Nature Without Borders Film Festival	Ocean Life Documentaries	Humpback Health	Won	Won Outstanding Excellence Award
2023	Nature Without Borders Film Festival	Environmental	Kelp: Hidden Treasure of the Salish Sea	Won	Won Outstanding Excellence Award
2023	NATAS Suncoast Chapter Regional Emmy Awards	Environment/Science	Life in the Dark: The Polar Night	Won	
2023	NATAS Suncoast Chapter Regional Emmy Awards	Environment/Science	Bermuda: Life at Ocean's Edge	Nominated	
2023	#LabMeCrazy! Science Film Festival	TV Production	Habitats: The Key to Florida's Fisheries	Finalist	
2023	Wild Oceans FilmFest	Best Production About Conservation	Kelp: Hidden Treasure of the Salish Sea	Finalist	
2022	NATAS Suncoast Chapter Regional Emmy Awards	Environment/Science	Humpback Health	Nominated	
2022	NATAS Suncoast Chapter Regional Emmy Awards	Environment/Science	Kelp: Hidden Treasure of the Salish Sea	Nominated	
2022	Tulum World Environment Film Festival	Ocean Conservation	A Decade After Deepwater	Won	Won Best Short Film in Ocean Conservation category
2022	Cinema Verde Film Festival	Florida Local Film Competition	Florida's Blue Holes: Oases in the Sea	Won	Won Most Hopeful Award
2022	Nature Without Borders Film Festival, Summer	Ocean Life	Recreational Shark Fishing: Collaborating for Conservation	Won	Won Excellence Award
2022	Nature Without Borders Film Festival, Summer	Ocean Life	At the Water's Edge: The Salt Marsh	Won	Won Excellence Award
2022	Nature Without Borders Film Festival, Summer	Ocean Life	Habitats: The Key to Florida's Fisheries	Won	Won Excellence Award
2022	Nature Without Borders Film Festival, Winter	Ornithology	Peru's Desert Penguins	Won	Won Excellence Award
2022	Nature Without Borders Film Festival, Winter	Oceanography	A Decade after Deepwater	Won	Won Exceptional Merit Award
2022	Nature Without Borders Film Festival, Winter	Ocean Life	American Samoa's Resilient Coral Reefs	Won	Won Exceptional Merit Award
2022	#LabMeCrazy! Science Film Festival	TV Production	Peru's Desert Penguins	Finalist	
2021	NATAS Suncoast Chapter Regional Emmy Awards	Environment	Alvin: Pioneer of the Deep	Won	
2021	NATAS Suncoast Chapter Regional Emmy Awards	Environment	At the Water's Edge: The Salt Marsh	Nominated	
2021	NATAS Suncoast Chapter Regional Emmy Awards	Environment	Recreational Shark Fishing: Collaborating for Conservation	Nominated	
2021	NATAS Suncoast Chapter Regional Emmy Awards	Environment	Habitats: The Key to Florida's Fisheries	Nominated	
2021	NATAS Suncoast Chapter Regional Emmy Awards	Writer- Long Form Content	Alvin: Pioneer of the Deep	Nominated	Writer: Liz Smith
2021	#LabMeCrazy! Science Film Festival	TV Production	Corals in Crisis	Won	
2021	The Accolade Global Film Competition	Documentary Program/Series	Alvin: Pioneer of the Deep	Won	Won Award of Excellence
2020	NATAS Suncoast Chapter Regional Emmy Awards	Environment	American Samoa's Resilient Coral Reefs	Won	
2020	NATAS Suncoast Chapter Regional Emmy Awards	Environment	A Decade After Deepwater	Won	
2020	NATAS Suncoast Chapter Regional Emmy Awards	Environment	Peru's Desert Penguins	Won	
2020	NATAS Suncoast Chapter Regional Emmy Awards	Environment	Florida's Blue Holes: Oases in the Sea	Nominated	
2020	Wild Oceans FilmFest	Best Production About Conservation	Corals in Crisis	Finalist	Postponed due to COVID-19
2020	Deering Estate	Programming Partner of the Year	Changing Seas	Won	
2019	NATAS Suncoast Chapter Regional Emmy Awards	Environment	Corals in Crisis	Won	
2019	NATAS Suncoast Chapter Regional Emmy Awards	Environment	Toxic Waters	Nominated	
2018	NATAS Suncoast Chapter Regional Emmy Awards	Health/Science	Dolphins: Breaking the Code	Nominated	
2017	NATAS Suncoast Chapter Regional Emmy Awards	Environment	The Future of Seafood	Nominated	
2017	NATAS Suncoast Chapter Regional Emmy Awards	Environment	Toxic Algae: Complex Sources and Solutions	Won	
2017	NATAS Suncoast Chapter Regional Emmy Awards	Environment	Majestic Mantas	Nominated	
2017	NATAS Suncoast Chapter Regional Emmy Awards	Health/Science	The Fate of Carbon	Won	
2017	Reef Renaissance Film Festival	Documentary Short	Beneath the Bridge	Won	Won Best-in-Show
2017	Reef Renaissance Film Festival	Documentary Short	Maug's Caldera: A Natural Laboratory	Won	Co-produced with Open Boat Films; Won third place in Documentary category
2016	BLUE Ocean Film Festival	Broadcast Series	Changing Seas	Finalist	
2016	BLUE Ocean Film Festival	Marine Animal Behavior	Beneath the Bridge	Finalist	
2016	BLUE Ocean Film Festival	Marine Animal Behavior	The Secret Sex Life of Fish	Finalist	
2016	BLUE Ocean Film Festival	Marine Science	Maug’s Caldera: A Natural Laboratory	Honorable Mention	Co-produced with Open Boat Films
2016	BLUE Ocean Film Festival	Marine Science	Sea Turtles: The Lost Years	Won	
2016	BLUE Ocean Film Festival	Ocean Exploration and Adventure	Living Fossils	Finalist	
2016	NATAS Suncoast Chapter Regional Emmy Awards	Environment	Beneath the Bridge	Won	
2016	NATAS Suncoast Chapter Regional Emmy Awards	Environment	Manatees: Conserving a Marine Mammal	Nominated	
2016	NATAS Suncoast Chapter Regional Emmy Awards	Environment	Maug’s Caldera: A Natural Laboratory	Won	Co-produced with Open Boat Films
2016	NATAS Suncoast Chapter Regional Emmy Awards	Health/Science	Sponges: Oldest Creatures in the Sea?	Won	
2016	Reef Renaissance Film Festival	Documentary Short	Grand Cayman’s Famous Stingrays	Won	Won Best-in-Show
2015	NATAS Suncoast Chapter Regional Emmy Awards	Health/Science/Environment	The Secret Sex Life of Fish	Won	
2015	BLUE Ocean Film Festival, Monaco	Broadcast TV Program	Galapagos: Windows into the Future	Finalist	a co-production with the Khaled bin Sultan Living Oceans Foundation
2015	BLUE Ocean Film Festival, Monaco	Shorts	Galapagos: Windows into the Future	Honorable Mention	a co-production with the Khaled bin Sultan Living Oceans Foundation
2015	REEF Renaissance Film Festival	Documentary Over 20 Minutes	Biggest Fish in the Sea	Won	Won Best-in-Show and Black Coral Award for 1st Place Documentary Over 20 Minutes
2015	REEF Renaissance Film Festival	Documentary Over 20 Minutes	Saving Sawfish	Won	Won Deep Blue Award
2015	REEF Renaissance Film Festival	Documentary Over 20 Minutes	Living Fossils	Won	Won Aquamarine Award
2014	NATAS Suncoast Chapter Regional Emmy Awards	Health/Science/Environment	Living Fossils	Won	
2014	NATAS Suncoast Chapter Regional Emmy Awards	Health/Science/Environment	Biggest Fish in the Sea	Nominated	
2014	NATAS Suncoast Chapter Regional Emmy Awards	Health/Science/Environment	Saving Sawfish	Nominated	
2014	BLUE Ocean Film Festival	Cultural Connections, People and the Sea	Sunken Stories	Finalist	
2014	BLUE Ocean Film Festival	Marine Science	Tracking Tigers	Finalist	
2014	BLUE Ocean Film Festival	Marine Science	Reefs of Rangiroa	Finalist	a co-production with the Khaled bin Sultan Living Oceans Foundation
2014	BLUE Ocean Film Festival	Marine Science	Creatures of the Deep	Honorable Mention	
2014	BLUE Ocean Film Festival	Marine Science	Grouper Moon	Honorable Mention	
2014	BLUE Ocean Film Festival	Marine Science	Coastal Carnivores	Honorable Mention	a co-production with Symbio Studios
2014	REEF Renaissance Film Festival	Documentary Short	Grouper Moon	Won	Won Best-in-Show and Black Coral Award for 1st Place Documentary Short
2014	REEF Renaissance Film Festival	Documentary Short	Sunken Stories	Won	Won Aquamarine Award for 3rd Place Documentary Short
2013	NATAS Suncoast Chapter Regional Emmy Awards	Health/Science/Environment	Creatures of the Deep	Nominated	
2012	NATAS Suncoast Chapter Regional Emmy Awards	Health/Science/Environment	Tracking Tigers	Nominated	
2011	NATAS Suncoast Chapter Regional Emmy Awards	Health/Science/Environment	Alien Invaders	Won	
2011	National Academies	Film/Radio/TV	Sentinels of the Seas	Won	
2011	Miami Today Gold Medal Award		Sentinels of the Seas	Won	
2010	NATAS Suncoast Chapter Regional Emmy Awards	Health/Science/Environment	Sentinels of the Seas	Won	
2009	NATAS Suncoast Chapter Regional Emmy Awards	Health/Science/Environment	Changing Seas Series	Nominated	
2009	International Wildlife Film Festival	Human-Wildlife Interactions	Super Grouper	Won	Won Honorable Mention for conservation message

=== Film Festival Official Selections ===
Year	Festival	Episode(s)	Notes
2026	International Ocean Film Festival	Whales in a Plastic Ocean	
2025	Cinema Verde International Environmental Film and Arts Festival	Maui Aloha ʻĀina: From Mauka to Makai; Eagle Rays: Soaring on Spotted Wings; Ancient Adriatic: Croatia's Sunken History	
2025	Friday Harbor Film Festival	Costa Rica's Surfing Paradise	
2025	S.O.F.A Film Festival	California Sea Otters: Life on the Edge; Whales in a Plastic Ocean	
2024	Wildlife Conservation Film Festival, NYC	Mollusks: More than a Shell; Bermuda: Life at Ocean’s Edge; Sharks in Belize: Jaguars of the Sea	
2024	Cinema Verde International Environmental Film and Arts Festival	Mollusks: More than a Shell; Life in the Dark: The Polar Night	
2024	International Ocean Film Festival's Traveling Program	Vanishing Whales	Screened at Wisconsin Coast Shipwreck National Marine Sanctuary
2024	Thunderbay International Film Festival	Vanishing Whales	Screened as part of the International Ocean Film Festival's Traveling Program; Hosted by the Thunder Bay National Marine Sanctuary
2024	Friday Harbor Film Festival	Ancient Adriatic: Croatia's Sunken History; Bermuda: Life at Ocean's Edge; Sharks in Belize: Jaguars of the Sea; Maui Aloha ʻĀina: From Mauka to Makai	
2024	World Whale Festival	Humpback Health	
2023	Wildlife Conservation Film Festival, NYC	Kelp: Hidden Treasure of the Salish Sea; Saving Florida's Starving Manatees	
2023	International Ocean Film Festival's Traveling Program	Vanishing Whales	World Ocean Day Florida Tour
2023	International Ocean Film Festival's Traveling Program	Sharks in Belize: Jaguars of the Sea	World Ocean Day Florida Tour
2023	Thunderbay International Film Festival	Recreational Shark Fishing: Collaborating for Conservation	Screened as part of the International Ocean Film Festival's Traveling Program; Hosted by the Thunder Bay National Marine Sanctuary
2023	International Ocean Film Festival, San Francisco	Vanishing Whales	
2023	Cinema Verde International Environmental Film and Arts Festival	Kelp: Hidden Treasure of the Salish Sea; Vanishing Whales; Saving Florida's Starving Manatees; Humpback Health	
2023	Nature Without Borders International Film Festival	Vanishing Whales; Humpback Health; Kelp: Hidden Treasure of the Salish Sea; Saving Florida's Starving Manatees	
2022	Green Planet Films Presents the International Film Festival in partnership with Mystic Aquarium	Kelp: Hidden Treasure of the Salish Sea	Screened as part of the International Ocean Film Festival's Traveling Program
2022	Summit to Sea Film Festival	Kelp: Hidden Treasure of the Salish Sea	Screened as part of the International Ocean Film Festival's Traveling Program
2022	Friday Harbor Film Festival	Kelp: Hidden Treasure of the Salish Sea	
2022	Wildlife Conservation Film Festival, NYC	At the Water’s Edge: The Salt Marsh; Habitats: The Key to Florida’s Fisheries; Recreational Shark Fishing: Collaborating for Conservation	
2022	TULUM World Environment Film Festival	American Samoa's Resilient Coral Reefs	
2022	Nature Without Borders Film Festival	Recreational Shark Fishing: Collaborating for Conservation; At the Water's Edge: The Salt Marsh; Alvin: Pioneer of the Deep; Habitats: The Key to Florida's Fisheries	
2022	World Whale Film Festival	Habitats: The Key to Florida’s Fisheries	
2022	International Ocean Film Festival, San Francisco	Recreational Shark Fishing: Collaborating for Conservation	
2022	Thunderbay International Film Festival, Alpena, Michigan	A Decade After Deepwater; American Samoa's Resilient Coral Reefs; Peru's Desert Penguins	Screened as part of the International Ocean Film Festival's Traveling Program; Hosted by the Thunder Bay National Marine Sanctuary
2021	S.O.F.A. Film Festival	American Samoa's Resilient Coral Reefs; Peru's Desert Penguins	
2021	International Ocean Film Festival, San Francisco	A Decade After Deepwater; American Samoa's Resilient Coral Reefs; Peru's Desert Penguins	
2021	Thunderbay International Film Festival, Alpena, Michigan	The Cordell Bank: A National Treasure; Mystery of the Humpback Whale Song; Corals in Crisis; Sunken Stories	Screened as part of the International Ocean Film Festival's Traveling Program
2021	Wildlife Conservation Film Festival, NYC	Florida's Blue Holes: Oases in the Sea; A Decade After Deepwater; Peru's Desert Penguins; American Samoa's Resilient Coral Reefs	
2021	Wildlife Conservation Film Festival, NYC	Majestic Mantas	World Wildlife Day Event; live panel discussion hosted by the US State Department as part of the Capitol Showcase Program
2021	Friday Harbor Film Festival	Alvin: Pioneer of the Deep	
2021	Environmental Film Festival in the Nation's Capital (DCEFF)	A Decade After Deepwater	
2021	World Whale Film Festival	Mystery of the Humpback Whale Song	
2020	International Ocean Film Festival, San Francisco	The Cordell Bank: A National Treasure; Mystery of the Humpback Whale Song	
2020	Wildlife Conservation Film Festival, NYC	Toxic Waters; Corals in Crisis; Mystery of the Humpback Whale Song	
2020	Friday Harbor Film Festival	A Decade After Deepwater	
2020	Korea International Ocean Film Festival	The Cordell Bank: A National Treasure	Screened in Busan, South Korea, as part of the International Ocean Film Festival's Traveling Program
2018	Thunderbay International Film Festival, Alpena, Michigan	Maug’s Caldera: A Natural Laborator	Screened as part of the International Ocean Film Festival's Traveling Program; Co-produced with Open Boat Films
2018	Wildlife Conservation Film Festival, NYC	Lords of the Wetlands	
2017	International Ocean Film Festival, San Francisco	Maug's Caldera: A Natural Laboratory	Co-produced with Open Boat Films
2017	Thunderbay International Film Festival, Alpena, Michigan	Grand Cayman's Famous Stingrays	Screened as part of the International Ocean Film Festival's Traveling Program
2017	Voices from the Water- International Traveling Film Festival on Water	Maug's Caldera: A Natural Laboratory	Co-produced with Open Boat Films
2016	International Ocean Film Festival, San Francisco	Grand Cayman’s Famous Stingrays; The Secret Sex Life of Fish	
2015	Thunderbay International Film Festival, Alpena, Michigan	Alien Invaders	Screened as part of the International Ocean Film Festival's Traveling Program
2015	Miami Underwater Festival	Grouper Moon; Saving Sawfish	Patricia and Phillip frost Museum of Science
2014	International Ocean Film Festival, San Francisco	Alien Invaders	
2014	40Fathoms Film Festival, Durban, South Africa	Alien Invaders	
2014	Miami Underwater Festival	Living Fossils	Patricia and Phillip frost Museum of Science
2013	Making Waves Film Festival, Boulder, Colorado	Alien Invaders	The festival was organized by the Colorado Ocean Coalition in partnership with the International Ocean Film Festival, San Francisco.
2012	Miami Underwater Festival	Reef Revival; Alien Invaders	Patricia and Phillip frost Museum of Science

== Funding ==
Funding for this program is provided by the Batchelor Foundation.

=== Additional Funding ===
Season #	Additional Funders
4	Divers Direct
5	Divers Direct
6	Divers Direct/Emocean Sports
7	Divers Direct/Emocean Sports; Do Unto Others Trust
8	Divers Direct/Emocean Sports; In Memory of Harriet Fagan; Do Unto Others Trust; The William J. McKeehan Foundation; Friends of Changing Seas
9	Divers Direct/Emocean Sports; Do Unto Others Trust; The William J. & Isobel G. Clarke Foundation; Lady Suzanna P. Tweed & Carleton Tweed Charitable Foundation; Skip & Diane Day
10	Divers Direct & Ocean Divers; Do Unto Others Trust; The Charles N. & Eleanor Knight Leigh Foundation; Tim Choate; Skip & Diane Day; Antoinette Paterakis Lambros; Kelly Arnold
11	The William J. & Tina Rosenberg Foundation; Do Unto Others Trust; Skip & Diane Day
12	The Arthur Vining Davis Foundations; The William J. & Tina Rosenberg Foundation; Do Unto Others Trust
13	In loving memory of David G. Parrot, by the Parrot Family Endowment for Environmental Education
14	The Parrot Family Endowment for Environmental Education
15	Trish & Dan Bell; The Parrot Family Endowment for Environmental Education
16	Trish & Dan Bell; The Parrot Family Endowment for Environmental Education
17	The Parrot Family Endowment for Environmental Education
