= WXEL =

WXEL may refer to:

- WXEL-TV, a television station (channel 42) licensed to West Palm Beach, Florida, United States
- WFLV, a radio station (90.7 FM) licensed to West Palm Beach, Florida, which held the call sign WXEL from 1985 to 2011
- WJW (TV), a television station (channel 8) licensed to Cleveland, Ohio, United States, which formerly used the call sign WXEL
