= WPBT =

Television station in Miami

- Miami–Fort Lauderdale–; Palm Beaches, Florida; United States
- City: Miami, Florida
- Channels: Digital: 29 (UHF), shared with WXEL-TV and WURH-LD; Virtual: 2
- Branding: South Florida PBS WPBT

Programming
- Affiliations: 2.1: PBS; for others, see § Subchannels

Ownership
- Owner: South Florida PBS, Inc.
- Sister stations: WXEL-TV; WURH-LD

History
- Founded: November 1953
- First air date: August 12, 1955
- Former call signs: WTHS-TV (shared operation, 1955–1979)
- Former channel numbers: Analog: 2 (VHF, 1955–2009); Digital: 18 (UHF, 2001–2019)
- Former affiliations: NET (1955–1970)
- Call sign meaning: "Public Broadcasting Television"

Technical information
- Licensing authority: FCC
- Facility ID: 13456
- ERP: 1,000 kW
- HAAT: 306 m (1,004 ft)
- Transmitter coordinates: 25°57′31″N 80°12′43″W
- Translator(s): W31DC-D 31 Fort Pierce

Links
- Public license information: Public file; LMS
- Website: www.wpbt2.org

WPBT (channel 2) is a PBS member television station in Miami, Florida, United States. It serves as the flagship station of South Florida PBS, which also owns Boynton Beach–licensed fellow PBS member WXEL-TV (channel 42, serving the West Palm Beach market) and Miami-licensed low-power station WURH-LD (channel 13). The three stations share transmitter facilities on Northwest 199th Street in Andover; WPBT's studios are located on Northeast 20th Avenue in North Miami. In addition to serving the Miami–Fort Lauderdale market, the station has significant viewership in much of the West Palm Beach market (alongside WXEL-TV), and is the only Miami area television station to serve the entire South Florida metropolis.

WPBT is one of two PBS member stations serving the Miami–Fort Lauderdale market, alongside WLRN-TV (channel 17), owned by Miami-Dade County Public Schools.

== History ==
The Community Television Foundation of South Florida was formed in November 1953. It immediately jumped into the bidding for Florida's first non-commercial educational television station. The only major competition came from the Dade County School Board. Ultimately, the Federal Communications Commission (FCC) awarded licenses to both groups in a time-share arrangement. They signed on channel 2 as a shared operation on August 12, 1955, operating as a member station of National Educational Television (NET) under the call letters WTHS-TV.

Under the arrangement, the school board and the foundation alternated airtime on channel 2 airing their programming from separate studios. The school board would air five hours of educational programming during the day, while Community Television Foundation was responsible for evening programming.

Gradually, Community Television Foundation expanded nighttime broadcasting hours, especially after the school board began WSEC-TV (channel 17) as a secondary station. WTHS-TV's broadcast day increased further after the formation of the Public Broadcasting Service (PBS) in 1969. At that time, the foundation began using the WPBT call letters for its programming. WTHS-TV continued to share the channel with WPBT until the Dade County Schools moved all instructional programming to WSEC-TV.

As both PBS and South Florida grew during the 1970s, it became apparent that a time-share arrangement was no longer feasible for what had become a major market. Finally, in 1979, the Dade County School Board relinquished its share of channel 2 and returned the WTHS license to the FCC. The board moved WTHS' programming inventory to channel 17, which changed its calls to WLRN-TV.

Until WXEL-TV signed on as the PBS member for West Palm Beach in 1982, WPBT served as the default PBS member for the Palm Beaches and Treasure Coast. For some time after WXEL signed on, WPBT continued to claim the Palm Beaches as part of its primary coverage area, going as far as to identify as "Miami/Fort Lauderdale/Palm Beaches" in 1986. The analog channel 2 signal traveled a very long distance under normal conditions.

In 1990, WPBT expanded upon its popularity of the Nightly Business Report program, by launching NBR Enterprises to sell videotapes and newsletters centered around the show.

WPBT partners with WFOR-TV to provide hurricane coverage with open captioning for those without TV sets that can show closed captioning when a hurricane warning is issued.

In 2010, WPBT rebranded as "2 HD" along with its children's program block KidVision.

On July 15, 2015, the Community Television Foundation announced an agreement with the WXEL Public Broadcasting Corporation, owner of WXEL-TV, to merge the two stations' operations into a new entity, to be known as "South Florida PBS". The merger, which was formally filed with the FCC on July 16, would enable the two stations to pool resources and fundraising efforts to offer more program content. However, the two stations have separate governing boards and conduct separate fundraising efforts. With the FCC's repack program, WXEL-TV would relocate its signal to WPBT's transmitter after relinquishing its digital channel 27 license to the FCC. WXEL continues to broadcast as a digital subchannel on WPBT's signal.

== Original programming ==
Some of WPBT's notable national programs include the science program Star Gazers, the bilingual sitcom ¿Qué Pasa, USA?, the film show film-maker and its most well known program, the business news and analysis program Nightly Business Report (which was widely distributed by public television stations, mainly those that are members of PBS and had its production responsibilities assumed by CNBC in 2013, and ended its run in December 2019). Locally produced programs that are seen exclusively on the station include Check, Please! South Florida, a restaurant review show based on the series Check, Please! that originated on fellow PBS station WTTW in Chicago.

The station also produces Your South Florida, a weekly half-hour public affairs and news program hosted by Pam Giganti that addresses issues in the local community.

WPBT has also produced two nature series, Wild Florida (hosted by Hunter Reno, which explored Florida's ecosystems and wildlife) and Changing Seas (which was narrated by Peter Thomas and explores the world's oceans along with leading experts who study the Earth's "last frontier"). It also produces several documentaries about the South Florida area; projects in development include Stranahan House, Florida’s State Parks, Into the Wild and Lost in Florida.

Since October 5, 1992 (one month before the 24th season of Sesame Street, six months after the debut of Barney & Friends and nine months after the debut of Lamb Chop's Play-Along), WPBT has had its very own children's programming block called KidVision which was a local version of PBS' children's strand (and later as PTV) until 2004 when it was turned into a local version of PBS Kids.

== Technical information ==
=== Subchannels ===
WPBT, WXEL-TV, and WURH-LD are broadcast from a transmitter facility on Northwest 199th Street in Andover. The shared signal is multiplexed:

Subchannels of WPBT, WXEL-TV, and WURH-LD
License	Subchannel	Res.	Short name	Programming
WPBT	2.1	1080i	WPBT-HD	PBS
WPBT	2.2	480i	Create	Create
WPBT	2.3	480i	WPBTHC	The Health Channel
WPBT	2.4	480i	KIDS360	PBS Kids
WXEL-TV	42.1	1080i	WXEL-DT	PBS
WURH-LD	13.1	480i	WURH	The Health Channel

=== Analog-to-digital conversion ===
WPBT ended regular programming on its analog signal, over VHF channel 2, on June 12, 2009, the official date on which full-power television stations in the United States transitioned from analog to digital broadcasts under federal mandate. The station's digital signal continued to broadcast on its pre-transition UHF channel 18, using virtual channel 2.

As part of the SAFER Act, WPBT kept its analog signal on the air until July 12 to inform viewers of the digital television transition through a loop of public service announcements from the National Association of Broadcasters.

=== Translator ===
- W31DC-D Fort Pierce
