= WMCU =

WMCU may refer to:

- WQOS (AM), a radio station (1080 AM) licensed to serve Coral Gables, Florida, United States, which held the call sign WMCU from 2007 to 2010
- WMLV, a radio station (89.7 FM) licensed to serve Miami, Florida, United States, which held the call sign WMCU from 1970 to 2007
