= WCCF =

WCCF may refer to:

- WCCF (AM), a radio station in Punta Gorda, Florida, United States
- World Club Champion Football, a Japanese collectible card game and arcade fantasy soccer game
- West Coast Computer Faire, a former annual computer industry conference
