= WCVU =

- Solana, Florida; United States
- Broadcast area: Charlotte County, Florida, North Port, Florida
- Frequency: 104.9 MHz
- Branding: Seaview 104.9

Programming
- Format: Oldies

Ownership
- Owner: iHeartMedia, Inc.; (iHM Licenses, LLC)
- Sister stations: WBCG, WBTT, WCCF, WCKT, WIKX, WOLZ, WWCD, WZJZ, WSRZ

History
- First air date: March 16, 1990 (as WMMY)
- Former call signs: WMMY (1990–1991); WQOL (1991); WMMY (1991–1995)
- Call sign meaning: "Seaview"

Technical information
- Licensing authority: FCC
- Facility ID: 71594
- Class: A
- ERP: 6,000 watts
- HAAT: 97 meters (318 ft)
- Transmitter coordinates: 26°53′37″N 82°3′3″W

Links
- Public license information: Public file; LMS
- Webcast: Listen live (via iHeartRadio)
- Website: wcvu.iheart.com

WCVU (104.9 FM) is a radio station broadcasting an oldies format. It is licensed to Solana, Florida, United States. The station is owned by iHeartMedia, Inc., through licensee iHM Licenses, LLC, and used to feature programming from Fox News Radio.

== History ==
former logo

The station went on the air as WMMY on March 16, 1990. On February 15, 1991, the station changed its call sign to WQOL; on March 3, 1991, to WMMY; and on September 25, 1995, to the current WCVU.
