= WURH =

WURH may refer to:

- WURH-CD, a television station (channel 25) licensed to serve Miami, Florida, United States
- WMRQ-FM, a radio station (104.1 FM) licensed to serve Waterbury, Connecticut, United States, which held the call sign WURH from 2007 to 2009
