= WSRX =

WSRX may refer to:

- WSRX-LP, a low-power radio station (107.9 FM) licensed to serve Vernon, New Jersey, United States
- WAYJ, a radio station (89.5 FM) licensed to serve Naples, Florida, United States, which held the call sign WSRX from 1992 to 2012
