= WXEL-TV =

Television station in Boynton Beach, Florida

- Boynton Beach–West Palm Beach, Florida; United States
- City: Boynton Beach, Florida (Note: Originally licensed to West Palm Beach; moved to Boynton Beach in 2018.)
- Channels: Digital: 29 (UHF), shared with WPBT and WURH-LD; Virtual: 42
- Branding: South Florida PBS WXEL

Programming
- Affiliations: 42.1: PBS

Ownership
- Owner: South Florida PBS, Inc.
- Sister stations: WPBT, WURH-LD

History
- First air date: July 8, 1982
- Former call signs: WWPF (CP, 1980–1982); WHRS-TV (1982–1985)
- Former channel numbers: Analog: 42 (UHF, 1982–2009); Digital: 27 (UHF, 2004–2018), 18 (UHF, 2018–2019)
- Call sign meaning: Excellence

Technical information
- Licensing authority: FCC
- Facility ID: 61084
- ERP: 1,000 kW
- HAAT: 306 m (1,004 ft)
- Transmitter coordinates: 25°57′31″N 80°12′43″W
- Translator(s): W31DC-D Fort Pierce

Links
- Public license information: Public file; LMS
- Website: www.wxel.org

WXEL-TV (channel 42) is a PBS member television station licensed to Boynton Beach, Florida, United States, serving the West Palm Beach area. Owned by South Florida PBS, it is a sister station to Miami-based flagship and fellow PBS member WPBT (channel 2) and low-power station WURH-LD (channel 13). The three stations share transmitter facilities on Northwest 199th Street in Andover; WXEL's studios are located on South Congress Avenue in Boynton Beach. WXEL, WPBT, and WURH-LD are also broadcast by a translator in Fort Pierce.

The launch of a public television station to serve the West Palm Beach area gained steam in the late 1970s, after the Palm Beach County School Board abandoned its permit for channel 42. A group eventually known as South Florida Public Telecommunications won the construction permit in 1979 after a settlement with WPBT, which long claimed the Palm Beaches as part of its service area and had also sought channel 42. However, the construction process for what eventually launched as WHRS-TV was protracted, primarily by environmental issues with the tower site. WHRS-TV launched on July 8, 1982, and changed its call sign to WXEL-TV at the start of 1985; for its first 25 years, it was co-owned with WHRS (90.7 FM). Originally broadcast from the school board's former instructional television studios, WXEL moved to its present studios in 1990. It was still dwarfed by WPBT, which continued to have more members in Palm Beach County alone than WXEL had total.

In the early 1990s, an employee revolt that resulted in the resignation of the station president was followed by high turnover, a lightning strike on the transmitter, and financial issues. Barry University, a private Catholic institution in Miami Shores, successfully fought proposals forcing it to cede part or all of the WXEL stations to Florida Atlantic University and became the sole owner in 1997. Barry University brought much-needed financial stability and led the digitalization and professionalization of WXEL. However, after a change in president, Barry started what would be an eight-year-long station sale process that ended with the station's president leading a group to buy WXEL-TV.

In 2015, WXEL merged with WPBT, its longtime competitor for viewers and members. The station's spectrum was sold at auction in 2016; as a result, WXEL-TV is broadcast by WPBT from its transmitter, which is located south of the West Palm Beach market.

== History ==
=== Permit fight and construction ===
Proposals for educational television in Palm Beach County first were floated by the Palm Beach County School Board in 1971, when a study was authorized to investigate the viability of such a station to operate on West Palm Beach's reserved channel 42. A construction permit application was filed that December with the Federal Communications Commission (FCC), but the school board never moved to provide the funding necessary for matching grants that would have financed construction. In 1972, a new superintendent came into office and argued that the board had no money to start a station and no business running one.

In 1975, a group known as Friends of Public Broadcasting formed to provide support for WHRS (91.7 FM), which the school board had previously founded. The group commissioned a study that found that 68 percent of Palm Beach County households could not receive Miami's channel 2 and there was enthusiasm in the county for a possible separate public station. In 1976, the school board signaled that it was willing to relinquish its channel 42 permit to make way for an application from the private group. Incorporating as the Public Broadcasting Foundation of Palm Beach, the group offered to take control of the county's neglected instructional television setup in exchange for the right to broadcast programs into the county schools. The proposed station and another outlet intended for Fort Pierce were seen as completing a statewide public broadcasting setup.

The owner of WPBT, the Community Television Foundation, filed an application for channel 42 on June 22, 1978, having previously investigated setting up a low-power translator on channel 42 before the Public Broadcasting Foundation filed its application. WPBT expressed its desire to continue serving its station members in Palm Beach County. One columnist for The Palm Beach Post, Alan Jenkins, wondered if the creation of a separate station merited the expense, particularly given the existing presence of WPBT among cable households. The competing applications led to a delay as the FCC adjudged the proposals; the Public Broadcasting Foundation also lost a federal grant because of the delay and incurred $67,000 in legal fees.

The dispute was settled in July 1979. The Public Broadcasting Foundation became the sole applicant for channel 42, while the Community Television Foundation received the Public Broadcasting Foundation's backing for a possible public station in Fort Pierce. In September, the FCC granted the construction permit, and the station received state and federal grants for construction costs. The station would broadcast from a tower in Greenacres City. This tower was being built by Malrite Communications, which would use it to broadcast a new commercial station, WFLX.

On July 1, 1980, the Public Broadcasting Foundation took control of the county's instructional television studios on Congress Avenue in Boynton Beach. Fundraising activities moved slowly at first but eventually perked up. However, foundation officials struggled to convince viewers that the station, which was assigned the call sign WWPF, would provide a different service from WPBT.

WWPF, which was already sometimes known as WHRS-TV in the local media even though the call sign did not formally change until May 24, 1982, intended to begin broadcasting on July 1, 1981, even though its hope to do so was threatened by cuts to public broadcasting made by the new Reagan administration. However, by May, the tower still had not been constructed because environmental approval was still pending on an access road to the tower site. One of the first board members and major fundraisers for the station, Victor Farris, resigned before going public with his concerns that WHRS-TV would never be built and calling the board members "dreamers". By that time, the projected start date had already slipped to the summer of 1982; Malrite was still negotiating with the Florida Audubon Society, a situation that persisted into early 1982. Founding board director Sam Marantz would later regret not using the Audubon Society to coordinate the five environmental agencies whose permits were needed and thereby reduce what turned out to be 14 months of startup delays.

The lengthy delays in station construction took a toll on the Public Broadcasting Foundation's finances, which were propped up by the operation of WHRS radio. Marantz, who had been a key figure in the incipient stages of the project but left in 1980, was reelected as board president in April 1982. He immediately cut 20 percent of the full-time staff and announced he would seek emergency loans to make payroll; however, this proved to not be necessary. He criticized the board as "self-serving" and noted a rift between the board and the full-time staff. However, the station was nearly complete.

=== Early years ===
The WHRS-TV transmitter was activated for the first time on June 23, 1982, with test signals. The station aired its first program, Sesame Street, on July 8. The first locally produced program, Financial Freedom with Jim Barry, debuted on August 12; it was based on the asset manager's book of the same title.

In January 1983, Lewis M. "Dusty" Sang became the new chairman of the station licensee, which had become known as South Florida Public Telecommunications. Sang devoted most of his energies to righting the ship at the young WHRS-TV by increasing fundraising efforts and community programming. On January 1, 1985, WHRS radio and television became WXEL and WXEL-TV; the new call sign signified "excellence" as a goal of public broadcasting. Sang also cited shedding the association of HRS with the state Department of Health and Rehabilitative Services and increasing identification with the stations. (Note: The station had taken its call sign from WHRS radio, which had started at the Hagen Road School.) Sang had gotten the idea for using WXEL from the station's program manager, who had once worked at a Cleveland television station known as WXEL in the 1950s. In 1985, the station began morning broadcasting for the first time, having originally been an evening-only operation that later added afternoon telecasts.

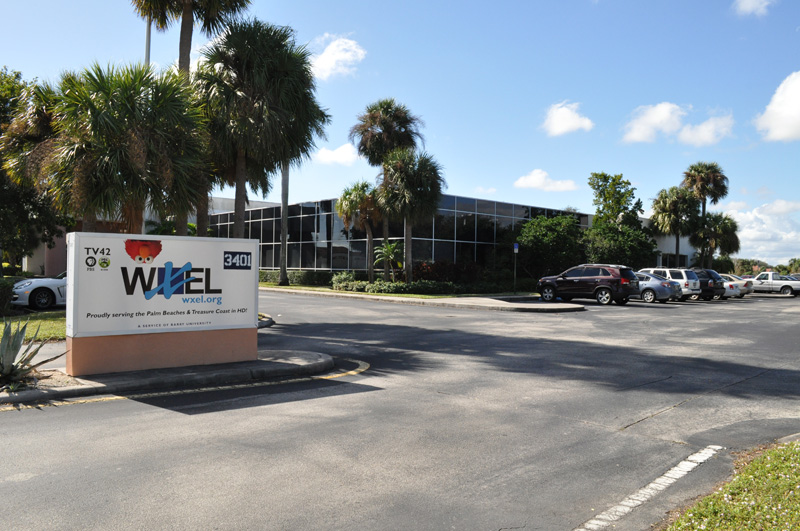
WXEL studios, 2012

Despite not being owned by the school board, WXEL radio and television continued to share the school board's office space in Boynton Beach. In 1985, the stations received a $3.2 million grant from the state of Florida to build a studio and offices somewhere in central Palm Beach County. The city of Boynton Beach deeded South Florida Public Telecommunications land elsewhere along Congress Avenue in 1986; Protests from nearby homeowners over a microwave tower at the site led to delays; ground was broken in May 1988, but during the process, the original general contractor and the insurance company associated with the work both defaulted, the latter resulting in a month-long halt to construction. The stations finally moved to the 35,000 square feet (3,300 m^{2}) building in February 1990.

The relationship between WXEL and WPBT continued to be frosty, as the two outlets continued to see each other as competition. WPBT dwarfed WXEL in public contributions ($3.79 million to $374,000), income ($8.5 million to $1 million), and employees paid more than $30,000 a year (73 to 6). WPBT refused to sell WXEL its Nightly Business Report; the general manager of WPBT told The Palm Beach Post, "Does Burger King sell their hamburgers to McDonald's?" WXEL considered that the agreement that led to its construction permit—and a promise not to pursue channel 21 in Fort Pierce—was voided when WPBT lobbied for cuts to state funding. An affiliate of Palm Beach Atlantic College eventually obtained the channel 21 permit, for which WXEL at one point entered into negotiations to acquire. When negotiations with WXEL fell apart, the college began talking to WPBT, which led to criticism not only from WXEL but from others in West Palm Beach television. The general manager of WPTV wrote the president of Palm Beach Atlantic College in disapproval, stating, "It appears the Miami outlet's sole purpose is to maintain its fundraising trolling in the more affluent communities in the West Palm Beach/Fort Pierce market." Had WPBT been successful, WXEL would have been sandwiched between two signals from its competitor, one to the north and the other to the south. However, the WPBT effort also fell through; unbeknownst to the Community Television Foundation, most of the equipment used in operating WTCE-TV had been sold to the Trinity Broadcasting Network (TBN) for capital, and in order to settle the debt with TBN, the college was forced to sell the station to the religious broadcaster.

The early 1990s saw the station expand its over-the-air coverage to the north. In 1992, it announced it would build translator W44AY, rebroadcasting WXEL from the former WTVX transmitter site on the St. Lucie–Indian River county line to some 200,000 people that had no over-the-air public television service. The translator was in service by June 1994.

=== 1992 employee revolt ===
WXEL had a rocky 1990s, with one of the largest events in the decade being a revolt by employees. On January 15, 1992, employees called for the resignation of chairman Sang over what they felt was misuse of funds and the hiring of a fundraising chief, John Dover—without a national search—in such a way that it could have jeopardized the public station's status and broadcast license by violating equal employment opportunity laws. Of the 64 employees of South Florida Public Telecommunications, 50 signed on to a letter demanding his resignation. The board of members, which backed Sang, then fired and suspended employees. As employees hired a Boca Raton law firm to investigate the hiring process, a local sponsor withheld its support and joined calls for Sang's resignation. The president of America's Public Television Stations, which represents public stations nationwide, called the revolt an unprecedented event in public television. An investigation by The Palm Beach Post, scrutinizing records of South Florida Public Telecommunications, found excessive spending on conference tables (more than $10,000 as compared to $877 for a similar purchase by WMFE-TV in Orlando the year before), lavish parties for donors, and on a fundraiser paid $25,000 more than a more experienced person in the same position at WPBT.

On January 25, Sang stepped down temporarily while a panel appointed by the board led an inquiry into the stations' finances. The crisis dented a previously scheduled radio fund drive which only drew a third of the expected pledges, while at least one donor threatened to switch her support of public television to WPBT. At an eight-hour hearing held in WXEL's Studio A, Sang downplayed the grievances at play but referred to "anarchy, mutiny, and insubordination" in his testimony, while staff offered complaints ranging from gala events that failed to bring in significant money to funds spent on research studies and a request by Sang that the greeters for such events be "only white, preferably attractive women" on the station staff.

On February 20, the panel delivered its findings and requested Sang's resignation; one of the suspended employees was reinstated to her position. The same day, Dover, the fundraising chief hired by Sang, resigned. The latter took place after he was surrounded by volunteers in the hallway of the station, to the astonishment of others. With Sang out of the picture, fundraising drives were urgently held in order to pay for immediate expenses, including PBS programming; WXEL had lost more than 1,300 members, seven percent of its total base, in six weeks, and the first full fund drive fell short of its goal.

In the years following the revolt, turnover among WXEL's staff was high. From February 1993 to January 1997, more than 100 employees had left an organization with an average payroll about half that number. WPBT briefly discussed a merger with WXEL at the start of 1993, before Mary Souder was named as WXEL's new leader. The transmitter was struck by lightning in July 1994, and WXEL-TV broadcast at reduced power for years.

=== Barry University ownership ===
In January 1997, negotiations were revealed to bring the WXEL stations under the aegis of Barry University, a Catholic university located in Miami Shores. The WXEL stations had suffered financially in the preceding years, with the lightning strike and cuts to federal and corporate grants resulting in a net loss of $400,000 in assets. A November 1996 financial report warned that either a merger or new revenue sources would be necessary to avoid cutbacks; at one point in 1994, the station's bank account held less than $2,000. For Barry, an attractive part of the merger was that it would provide publicity for the university in the West Palm Beach area. Three months prior, in October 1996, WXEL had mortgaged itself to Barry in exchange for a short-term $275,000 loan.

News of the Barry merger talks brought other potential bidders out of the woodwork. One of those was WPBT, whose advisory board for Palm Beach and Martin counties recommended proposing a buyout to WXEL, though it was unclear what would happen to WXEL-FM, which was sharing programming with Miami's WLRN-FM. WPBT touted the fact that it had more members in Palm Beach County than WXEL had total (20,500 to 13,000). A consortium of public universities under the Florida Board of Regents also made a bid on the stations. However, the WXEL board, in a hastily called meeting announced to the board by overnight mail, turned down both offers and voted to approve a merger with Barry University on January 24. The speed at which the merger was approved led to a rebuke by the editorial board of The Palm Beach Post, while the state government sent a request for information after the chancellor of the state university system wrote a letter to the Attorney General of Florida and the Florida Department of Education. Information sent in response to the request revealed that merger talks with Barry had begun in June 1996. In the meantime, Barry continued infusing cash into WXEL in order to prop up the public broadcaster: president Jeanne O'Laughlin expressed her belief that, without Barry's support, it "would not be in existence".

On February 18, the attorney general ruled that the Florida Cabinet, in its capacity as the state board of education, would have to approve WXEL's merger with Barry because it involved a state lease. The opinion from the attorney general found that a subsidiary created by Barry to facilitate the merger did not qualify as a state-authorized "educational or non-commercial broadcasting entity" to which the lease could be transferred. Three days later, Florida Atlantic University (FAU) and three community colleges formed a consortium seeking to run the WXEL stations for themselves. Governor Lawton Chiles suggested that Barry and the public college consortium share ownership of the stations. WXEL eyed public ownership warily; a station vice president worried that, as a division of a state university, it would be more vulnerable to funding cuts. The consortium led by FAU, in turn, had brought on WPBT to manage the stations in the event they got the licenses. Negotiations also began between FAU and Barry on a possible compromise. The Florida Cabinet voted unanimously to support such an ownership merger, though the plan continued to languish amid disputes over the shape of a partnership. In early June, Barry asked the Cabinet to approve outright ownership of WXEL by the Catholic university but came up one vote short on its first attempt, with the Cabinet asking it to return in August with a new plan.

Ultimately, the state schools failed to find enough money to become equal partners with Barry University, which in August 1997 became the full owner of the WXEL stations. Station president Souder was removed by the new management, while a $2.5 million donation by Dwayne Andreas, CEO of Archer Daniels Midland, erased all of WXEL's debt. Andreas and his wife were the largest single contributors to Barry University.

Barry tapped Jerry Carr, a longtime commercial television executive, to serve as the first permanent manager of the WXEL stations under its management. Carr's career in management had included being general manager of WBFS-TV in Miami, serving as the head of television operations for parent Grant Broadcasting System, and later managing WTVX while Paxson Communications Corporation managed it. Carr led an aggressive turnaround plan. The transmitter was repaired, restoring television coverage outside of Palm Beach County; Carr used must-carry laws to force WXEL onto every cable system in Broward County, within its coverage area, and even into Miami-Dade County; a public relations and marketing staff was hired; and several new local programs were started. These moves and others led to a doubling of prime-time ratings and a 30-percent increase in memberships. However, the Barry merger voided the original lease WXEL had with Malrite for the WFLX tower, resulting in a fourfold increase in rent. The station was more competitive with WPBT in its battle for viewers and members, though WPBT still had more members in Palm Beach County and the Treasure Coast than WXEL had total, and the overlap continued to deny WXEL access to WPBT-produced programs and several national vendors. From 1997 to 2001, WXEL steadily climbed out of its debt, though a decline in corporate giving after the September 11 attacks led to financial losses in 2002 for the first time since the Barry merger.

Another task facing Barry as owner of WXEL-TV was replacing the station's aged equipment and raising funds for the transition to digital television. The National Telecommunications and Information Administration classed WXEL-TV in 1998 as having an "urgent" priority for an equipment overhaul, with many components being obsolete and replacement parts becoming harder to find. The station's digitalization capital campaign was kicked off in 2000 by a $1 million donation. Digital also brought a one-time bonus to WXEL. In 2003, it received $6.4 million, payable over 15 years, as part of a three-way settlement with Paxson Communications Corporation and NBC, as owner of WTVJ (channel 6), involving digital channel assignments in the Miami and West Palm Beach areas. WXEL began digital broadcasting on channel 27 on July 4, 2004.

=== WNET sale attempt ===
At the age of 75, Jeanne O'Laughlin retired as president of Barry University in 2004; during this time, the full-time staff more than doubled, while the stations' list of large underwriters had grown from several dozen to more than 200. The change in university leadership, however, also prompted Barry University to investigate possibly spinning out or selling the WXEL stations. Yet again, suitors appeared for the stations: a group of community leaders; FAU; Nova Southeastern University; Educational Broadcasting Corporation (EBC), parent of WNET, the public television station serving New York City; and WPBT.

In April 2005, Barry selected a $5 million bid from the Educational Broadcasting Corporation, believed to be the first case of a PBS member station in one state purchasing a station in another; the Community Broadcasting Foundation of the Treasure Coast would in turn join the EBC bid. However, the next month, language inserted into the Florida state budget clouded the attempt by directing the state Board of Education, which would once more have to approve the deal, to prioritize "in-state public postsecondary institutions"—in other words, institutions such as FAU. The pending sale led to a decline in donations to WXEL itself. Even though the president of FAU would not block Barry's sale, the deal continued to languish for months, awaiting state approval. The Board of Education sought $1 million as a partial compensation for its investment in the stations over the years. The state ultimately approved after EBC agreed to allow FAU the use of an HD Radio subchannel on WXEL FM for student programming.

With the state of Florida approving of the sale, it fell to the FCC to grant the transfer of the licenses. However, by October 2007, this had still not taken place. According to The Palm Beach Post, the FCC was concerned about the impact of a New York City-based broadcaster owning a public television station in Florida. A West Palm Beach resident expressed similar concerns in an informal objection with the FCC, arguing that the purchase ran counter to "the spirit of local public broadcasting". Meanwhile, the station continued to suffer in donations and other logistical matters, such as repairs for damage from Hurricane Wilma.

In May 2008, Barry University and EBC terminated the sale agreement, more than three years after EBC had been selected to buy the WXEL stations. The FCC had privately expressed reservations about the ability of EBC to provide local control for the WXEL stations. Barry then reopened the sale process and called again for interested bidders. Despite looming budget cuts at the height of the Great Recession, the Palm Beach County school board voted in December 2008 to authorize negotiations to purchase the station. The school board sought partners to assist in its operation, but WPBT and the Community Broadcasting Foundation bristled at the level of control the school board wanted over the stations. Ultimately, however, the school board dropped its proposal, stating that it needed the money it would have used to buy WXEL to pay salaries.

During this time, on June 12, 2009, WXEL-TV shut off its analog signal. It continued to broadcast in digital on channel 27, using virtual channel 42.

=== WXEL Public Broadcasting Corporation ownership ===
Barry began exploring the possibility of selling WXEL radio and television separately in 2009 and reached an agreement with Classical South Florida, a division of the American Public Media Group, to sell WXEL-FM. Also in 2010, Jerry Carr retired from the station, with Bernie Henneberg being named president.

In 2011, Henneberg and other station managers organized as the WXEL Public Broadcasting Corporation and made a proposal to Barry University to buy the station for $700,000. Negotiations with the group stretched into February 2012, when a final deal was reached. The $1.44 million transaction was approved by the Barry University board in March 2012; state approval swiftly followed, followed by the FCC in July, resulting in the sale being consummated late that month.

At its first operational meeting in January 2013, the new community board immediately sought to renegotiate its 2003 settlement with NBC so as to receive what it was owed sooner and use that to pay down debt used to purchase the station.

=== Merger with WPBT ===
WPBT and WXEL, long competitors for viewers in Broward and Palm Beach counties, announced in July 2014 that they were once again exploring a merger, this time into an entity that would be known as South Florida PBS. In a joint news release, the stations cited precedent for public television mergers in New York City (WNET and WLIW) and Cincinnati and Dayton, Ohio (ThinkTV and CET); a merger would remove duplication between the two stations' programs, though there was concern about the sale of WXEL's spectrum.

On July 15, 2015, Community Television Foundation of South Florida and WXEL Public Broadcasting Corporation announced they had reached a merger agreement. The merger, which was formally filed with the FCC on July 16, would enable the two stations to pool resources and fundraising efforts to offer more program content. The merger was finalized in October 2015; WXEL president Henneberg became chief financial officer of the merged South Florida PBS.

In the 2016 United States wireless spectrum auction, South Florida PBS sold the spectrum of WXEL-TV for $4,696,299 and announced that WXEL-TV would move to the WPBT multiplex. WPBT intended to use the auction earnings to pay down debt and fund educational projects. A third license was added to the channel share after South Florida PBS was donated WIMP-CD (now WURH-LD). The change to sharing with WPBT took place on August 22, 2018; since the transmitter was now much further south, many viewers in the West Palm Beach area experienced new difficulty receiving WXEL-TV. WXEL-TV's community of license was changed from West Palm Beach to Boynton Beach to continue to meet coverage requirements after the transmitter change. The WPBT multiplex itself was repacked from channel 18 to channel 29 in April 2019.

== Subchannels ==
WPBT, WXEL-TV, and WURH-LD are broadcast from a transmitter facility on Northwest 199th Street in Andover. The shared signal is multiplexed:

Subchannels of WPBT, WXEL-TV, and WURH-LD
License	Subchannel	Res.	Short name	Programming
WPBT	2.1	1080i	WPBT-HD	PBS
WPBT	2.2	480i	Create	Create
WPBT	2.3	480i	WPBTHC	The Health Channel
WPBT	2.4	480i	KIDS360	PBS Kids
WXEL-TV	42.1	1080i	WXEL-DT	PBS
WURH-LD	13.1	480i	WURH	The Health Channel
