= WWCD =

WWCD may refer to:

- WWCD (AM), a radio station (1070 AM) licensed to serve Solana, Florida, United States
- WXZX, a radio station (105.7 FM) licensed to serve Hilliard, Ohio, United States, which held the call sign WWCD in 2024
- WXGT, a radio station (1580 AM) licensed to serve Columbus, Ohio, which held the call sign WWCD from 2020 to 2024
- WKVR (FM), a radio station (102.5 FM) licensed to serve Baltimore, Ohio, which held the call sign WWCD from 2010 to 2020
- WOSA, a radio station (101.1 FM) licensed to serve Grove City, Ohio, which held the call sign WWCD from 1990 to 2010
- WWCD (album), 2019 album by Griselda
