= WDLV =

- Fort Myers, Florida; United States
- Broadcast area: Southwest Florida
- Frequency: 88.7 MHz (HD Radio)

Programming
- Format: Contemporary Christian
- Subchannels: HD2: Air1; HD3: K-Love Eras
- Network: K-Love

Ownership
- Owner: Educational Media Foundation

History
- First air date: October 9, 1987
- Former call signs: WAYJ (1986–2012); WNPS (2012–2015)
- Call sign meaning: Contains LV for "Love"

Technical information
- Licensing authority: FCC
- Facility ID: 64256
- Class: C1
- ERP: 75,000 watts
- HAAT: 306.8 meters (1,007 ft)
- Transmitter coordinates: 26°25′23″N 81°37′48″W

Links
- Public license information: Public file; LMS
- Webcast: Listen live; HD2: Listen live
- Website: www.klove.com; HD2: www.air1.com

WDLV (88.7 FM) is a non-commercial, listener-supported radio station in Fort Myers, Florida. It airs a Christian contemporary radio format and is part of the Educational Media Foundation's K-Love network.

WDLV has an effective radiated power (ERP) of 75,000 watts.

== History ==
=== WAY-FM ===
The station was founded by Bob and Felice Augsburg as WAYJ, a contemporary Christian music (CCM)-formatted station. It was a way to expand messages about Christianity to a younger audience, following the success of their weekly program for youth on another local Christian station, WSOR.

WAYJ was first station and former flagship of the WAY-FM Network; after establishing additional stations, the WAY-FM group would relocate its corporate offices to Colorado Springs, Colorado, in 2001.

=== Ownership changes ===
On February 14, 2012, Classical South Florida said it was in the process of acquiring WAYJ from WAY-FM for $4.35 million. Following the announcement of the sale, WAY-FM announced that the organization would acquire competing station WSRX (89.5 FM). It is licensed to Naples and was owned by the Family Church of Marco Island. This move was designed to continue WAY-FM programming in its legacy Southwest Florida market. In the interim, programming from WAYJ began simulcasting on WSRX on March 1, 2012.

Upon completion of the sale on June 7, 2012, WAYJ's call sign was changed to WNPS. The WAYJ call letters were transferred to 89.5 on June 18, 2012.

=== K-Love ===
On July 17, 2015, WNPS was sold to Educational Media Foundation (EMF) and switched to EMF's K-Love network under new call letters, WDLV. In consequence, the CCM format, which is featured on K-Love, resumed at 88.7 FM after three years, but is now competing with the former occupant of 88.7, WAYJ.

Following this switch of formats, the prior K-Love affiliate in the Fort Myers area, WLVO (98.5 FM), became affiliated with Radio Nueva Vida. EMF's purchase of WDLV, along with co-owned WFLV, WMLV, W214BD, and W270AD, was consummated on November 2, 2015, at a price of $21.7 million.

In November 2022 WDLV began broadcasting an HD Radio signal, airing their Air 1 network on HD-2 and K-Love 90s on HD-3. Air 1 can also be found on translator W278DD (103.5 FM).
