= WAYJ =

- Naples, Florida; United States
- Frequency: 89.5 MHz (HD Radio)
- Branding: WAY-FM

Programming
- Format: Christian adult contemporary
- Subchannels: HD2: Spanish Christian adult contemporary; HD3: Contemporary worship music; HD4: WMYE simulcast

Ownership
- Owner: WAY-FM Network; (Hope Media Group)
- Sister stations: WAYF

History
- First air date: February 1, 1988
- Former call signs: WBPT (1988–1992); WSRX (1992–2012)
- Call sign meaning: "Way"

Technical information
- Licensing authority: FCC
- Facility ID: 59831
- Class: C1
- ERP: 100,000 watts
- HAAT: 94.1 meters (309 ft)
- Transmitter coordinates: 26°7′13.3″N 81°40′57.3″W
- Translator: See § Translators
- Repeater: 95.3 WOLZ-HD2 (Fort Myers)

Links
- Public license information: Public file; LMS
- Website: wayfm.com; vidaunida.com (HD2); worship247.com (HD3)

WAYJ (89.5 FM) is a radio station airing a Christian adult contemporary format, licensed to serve Naples, Florida, United States. The station is owned and operated by WAY-FM Network.

== History ==
The station went on the air as WBPT on February 1, 1988, as "Power 89.5 The Spark". It was a simulcast of WSRX (now WJYO) 91.5 "The Spark", which was playing hip-hop, freestyle, and dance music at the time.

On June 16, 1992, the station changed its call sign to WSRX, broadcasting as The Spark, with Arnie Coones. Later, Jim Channell, Donna Jones, Bob Edgar and Connie McNair were the hosts sharing Jesus across S.W. Florida as Praise FM, 89.5. The station was moved to the Shadowlawn Assembly of God Church, and there Shelre' joined the group and open the airways to adult contemporary Christian music 24 hours a day. Later, the station went to 100,000 watts.

On February 14, 2012, it was announced that WAY-FM was in the process of acquiring WSRX from the Family Church; this move was designed to continue WAY-FM programming in its legacy Southwest Florida market, following plans by Classical South Florida to acquire its now-former station, WAYJ (88.7 FM). On March 1, 2012, WSRX's programming was discontinued, in favor of simulcasting WAYJ in the interim. On June 7, 2012, the sale of WAYJ to Classical South Florida was completed, becoming classical music station WNPS, with WAY-FM programming exclusively heard on WSRX. On June 18, 2012, the station changed its call sign to the current WAYJ.

== Translators ==
WOLZ 95.3 FM repeats WAYJ on its HD Radio subchannel.

Broadcast translator for WOLZ-HD2
Call sign	Frequency	City of license	FID	ERP (W)	HAAT	Class	FCC info
W263BI	100.5 FM	Fort Myers, Florida	143063	250	322 m (1,056 ft)	D	LMS
