= Festival International du Film Maritime, exploration et l'environnement =

The Festival International du Film Maritime, d'Exploration et d'Environnement is a film festival held annually in the Palais Neptune, Palais des Congrès, in Toulon, France.

The festival concentrates on exploration, the environment and knowledge of the sea and under the sea. It includes competitions for photographs and films. It was the first festival of its type and inspired others, notably the San Francisco Ocean Film Festival in the USA.

== Founder ==
The festival was founded by Jacques-Henri Baixe, who began his career as a navy doctor. He practised underwater diving and later became a doctor specialising in diving medicine. He was also an avid collector of films: he created the Cinémathèque Mondiale de la Mer (World Film Library of the Sea). He produced and directed films himself, as well as television broadcasts. He died in 2001.

== History ==
The first Festival was held in 1954 in the Maison de la Chimie in Paris. The second Festival was held in San Diego in 1957. In subsequent years, it alternated between the Gaumont Palace Cinema in Toulon, the Salle Pleyel in Paris, Port Grimaud near St-Tropez, the Centre Culturel de Châteauvallon near Toulon, the Opéra Municipal de Toulon, and finally, since its construction in 1991, the Palais Neptune at the Palais des Congrès de Toulon.
