= WMLV =

K-Love radio station in Miami

- Miami, Florida; United States
- Broadcast area: Miami–Fort Lauderdale–; South Florida
- Frequency: 89.7 MHz
- Branding: K-Love

Programming
- Language: English
- Format: Contemporary Christian
- Network: K-Love

Ownership
- Owner: Educational Media Foundation
- Sister stations: WFLV; WDLV

History
- First air date: 1970
- Former call signs: WMCU (1970–2007); WKCP (2007–2015)
- Call sign meaning: Miami Love

Technical information
- Licensing authority: FCC
- Facility ID: 68118
- Class: C
- ERP: 100,000 watts
- HAAT: 309 meters (1,014 ft)
- Transmitter coordinates: 25°32′24″N 80°28′7″W

Links
- Public license information: Public file; LMS
- Webcast: Listen live
- Website: www.klove.com

WMLV (89.7 FM), branded as "K-Love", is a contemporary Christian-formatted radio station in Miami, Florida, owned by Educational Media Foundation. This listener supported, nonprofit public radio station had been owned by American Public Media Group (APMG), the parent nonprofit support organization of Minnesota Public Radio. The station was operated by Classical South Florida, a Florida nonprofit corporation owned by the American Public Media Group. The station's primary transmitter is located at 17107 SW 248 Street, 4.5 miles (7.2 km) north of downtown Homestead.

WMLV's programming is simulcast on WFLV in West Palm Beach and WDLV in Fort Myers. As WKCP, it originally used translator station W270AD at 101.9 FM, until that station adopted National Public Radio (NPR) programming shortly after APMG purchased WPBI (now WFLV) from Barry Communications in May 2011. WPBI's main signal still ran NPR news briefs at the top of drive time hours, and its HD2 subchannel also carried NPR programming, which was simulcast on W270AD.

== Lawsuit by former listeners ==
WMLV was formerly WMCU, a Christian radio station owned by Trinity University.

On October 19, 2007, the Christian Family Coalition spearheaded a lawsuit brought by two local residents, who filed suit against American Public Media and Trinity University and its officers, seeking an injunction and $15,000 in damages for the plaintiffs and an injunction to block the sale of WMCU and format change. The station signed back on a week prior to what was originally planned, partly in an effort to thwart any potential legal action prior to Federal Communications Commission (FCC) approval of the sale.

The FCC did eventually approve the sale, in March 2008, upheld following an Application for Review to the full FCC, and while the parties involved in the campaign to try to regain the frequency continued on for several years with the state, the station has not been affected by those other matters as the issues raised by those parties concerned the seller only.

== Sale to EMF and format change to K-Love ==
On July 17, 2015, WKCP and the two other Classical South Florida stations were sold to Educational Media Foundation and switched to EMF's K-Love contemporary Christian format under new call letters, WMLV. In consequence, Christian programming resumed at 89.7 FM for the first time since 2008. EMF's purchase of WMLV, along with co-owned WDLV, WFLV, W214BD, and W270AD, was consummated on November 2, 2015, at a price of $21.7 million.
