= WBTT =

- Naples Park, Florida; United States
- Broadcast area: Cape Coral-Fort Myers metropolitan area
- Frequency: 105.5 MHz (HD Radio)
- Branding: 105.5 The Beat

Programming
- Format: Rhythmic Contemporary

Ownership
- Owner: iHeartMedia, Inc.; (iHM Licenses, LLC)
- Sister stations: WBCG, WCCF, WCKT, WCVU, WIKX, WOLZ, WWCD, WZJZ

History
- First air date: October 22, 1987; 38 years ago
- Former call signs: WIXI (1987–1996); WXRM (1996–1997); WQNU (1997–2000)
- Call sign meaning: "The Beat"

Technical information
- Licensing authority: FCC
- Facility ID: 55756
- Class: C2
- ERP: 23,500 watts
- HAAT: 220 meters (720 ft)
- Transmitter coordinates: 26.317°N 81.787°W

Links
- Public license information: Public file; LMS
- Webcast: Listen live (via iHeartRadio)
- Website: 1055thebeat.iheart.com

WBTT (105.5 FM) is an urban-leaning rhythmic contemporary radio station licensed to Naples Park, Florida, and serving the Cape Coral-Fort Myers metropolitan area. The station's studios and offices are on Metro Parkway in Fort Myers. WBTT has an effective radiated power (ERP) of 23,500 watts.

== History ==
The station signed on the air on October 22, 1987. Its original call sign was WIXL. Owned by Woodlinger Broadcasting it aired an adult standards format from the Satellite Music Network (SMN). It was powered at 950 watts, a fraction of its current output.

Through the years it has had several different formats and call signs. WBTT's previous format was country music, when it was WQNU prior to its flip to rhythmic contemporary in the spring of 2000.
