= WBCG =

Radio station in Murdock, Florida

- Murdock, Florida; United States
- Broadcast area: Charlotte County, Florida
- Frequency: 98.9 MHz
- Branding: BIG 98.9

Programming
- Format: Classic rock

Ownership
- Owner: iHeartMedia, Inc.; (iHM Licenses, LLC)
- Sister stations: WBTT, WCCF, WCKT, WCVU, WIKX, WOLZ, WWCD, WZJZ

History
- First air date: November 2, 1998; 27 years ago (as WHHD)
- Former call signs: WHHD (1998–2001)
- Call sign meaning: "Big"

Technical information
- Licensing authority: FCC
- Facility ID: 82071
- Class: A
- ERP: 5,500 watts
- HAAT: 104 meters (341 ft)
- Transmitter coordinates: 27°0′9.00″N 82°10′54.00″W

Links
- Public license information: Public file; LMS
- Webcast: Listen Live
- Website: big989.iheart.com

WBCG (98.9 FM) is a radio station licensed to Murdock, Florida. Owned by iHeartMedia, Inc., the station broadcasts a classic rock music format branded as "BIG 98.9", syndicated from iHeartMedia, Inc.'s Premium Choice network.

== History ==
The station was assigned the call sign WHHD on November 2, 1998. On November 26, 2001, the station changed its call sign to the current WBCG.

On May 5, 2014, the station re-branded from "Beach 98.9" to "98.9 MyFM", maintaining its hot adult contemporary format.

On October 7, 2019, the station changed its format to contemporary Christian music as "UP! 98.9".

On August 1, 2022, the station changed its format again to classic rock music as "BIG 98.9".
