= WMYE =

- Fort Myers, Florida; United States
- Frequency: 91.9 MHz
- Branding: "Call Radio"

Programming
- Format: Christian contemporary hit radio

Ownership
- Owner: Call Communications Group

Technical information
- Licensing authority: FCC
- Facility ID: 174244
- Class: A
- ERP: 1,200 watts
- HAAT: 100 meters (330 ft)
- Transmitter coordinates: 26°47′8.74″N 81°47′45.90″W
- Repeater: 101.1 WAYJ-HD4 (Naples)

Links
- Public license information: Public file; LMS
- Webcast: Listen Live
- Website: CallFM.com

WMYE (91.9 FM) is a non-commercial, listener supported radio station licensed to Fort Myers, Florida. The station is currently owned by Call Communications Group. WMYE is one of several South Florida FM stations simulcasting a Christian Contemporary Top 40 format, known as "Call Radio."
