= American Public Media Group =

American public radio organization

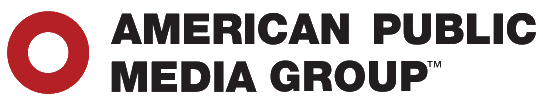
- Abbreviation: APMG
- Formation: September 1987; 39 years ago
- Type: Non-profit
- Tax ID no.: 36-3503764
- Headquarters: St. Paul, Minnesota
- Key people: Jean Taylor (President and CEO); Bradbury H. Anderson (Chairman)
- Subsidiaries: Minnesota Public Radio; American Public Media; Southern California Public Radio
- Website: americanpublicmediagroup.org
- Formerly called: Minnesota Communications Group

American Public Media Group (APMG), formerly the Minnesota Communications Group, is the non-profit parent organization of Minnesota Public Radio, American Public Media, and Southern California Public Radio. Jean Taylor is APMG's President and CEO.

== History ==
=== Minnesota Communications Group ===
In the second quarter 1998, Minnesota Communications Group and Greenspring Company approved the sale of Greenspring's catalog sales business, Rivertown Trading, to Dayton Hudson for $120 million. $90 million of the sale price would go into MPR's endowment fund, which then totaled only $19 million. Greenspring President Bill Kling and two other top executives received $7.3 million of proceeds via a "value participation unit" plan. Rivertown Trading started with a Prairie Home Companion–inspired "Powder milk Biscuit" poster order form in 1981.

=== American Public Media Group ===
American Public Media Group sold Greenspring Media Group, a for-profit publishing company, to Hour Media LLC in July 2013 as Greenspring was losing money. On August 27, 2014, APMG launched its podcasting network, Infinite Guest, with 12 shows, three existing APM programs, a MPR Classical program, two independent podcasts and six new ones. It is now called APM Podcasts

APMG began a series of radio station acquisition in Florida that ended up being its Classical South Florida (CSF) station group costing $30 million which was mostly paid for using bonds. APMG purchased WKCP in 2007 from Trinity International Foundation for $20 million. From Barry University in 2011, APMG purchased WPBI-FM in West Palm Beach for $4 million. With in a year, Way Media sold WNPS-FM in Fort Myers to APMG for $4.3 million. The subsidiary was losing $1 million per year. Educational Media Foundation offered $21.7 million in May 2015 for the stations. A large number of CSF's board directors resigned at APMG's acceptance of the offer before consulting the CSF board and that other purchaser could have been found for the stations. The sale closed in July 2015 leaving APMG with $8 million in bond debt over the sale price. The classical music on CSF was moved online to YourClassical.org the week of July 14, 2015, with CSF ceasing broadcasting. Educational Media Foundation's Christian programming began broadcasting while awaiting FCC approval.

In July 2025, APMG announced it will layoff 5% to 8% of staff due to a $6 million budget deficit.

== Subsidiaries ==
The American Public Media Group operates several sub-organizations, including:

- Minnesota Public Radio (MPR), a public radio network in Minnesota
- American Public Media (APM), program producer and distributor
- Southern California Public Radio (SCPR), a public radio network in Southern California
- Public Radio Market, an Amazon.com affiliate

== Finances ==
American Public Media Group receives substantial financial support from the Lumina Foundation to provide coverage of education-related issues that are of interest to the Lumina Foundation and its frequent partner in education policy initiatives, the Gates Foundation. Critics have suggested that this funding may lead to biased coverage and have noted the Lumina Foundation's connections to the private student loan company Sallie Mae. Lumina-funding of the American Public Media Group is not always disclosed in education press coverage or in coverage of white papers, articles, or editorials by other Lumina or Gates Foundation grantees, such as the New America Foundation.

In 2004, the combined revenue of APMG and MPR was US$84.9 million, making it the largest non-profit in Minnesota's arts and culture sector.
