= WZJZ =

Coordinates: 26.786°N 81.796°W

- Port Charlotte, Florida; United States
- Broadcast area: Fort Myers–Southwest Florida
- Frequency: 100.1 MHz (HD Radio)
- Branding: Magic 100.1

Programming
- Language: Spanish
- Format: Latin pop and adult contemporary music

Ownership
- Owner: iHeartMedia; (iHM Licenses, LLC)
- Sister stations: WBCG, WBTT, WCCF, WCKT, WCVU, WIKX, WOLZ, WWCD

History
- First air date: 1976; 50 years ago
- Former call signs: WEEJ (1976–1996); WFSN (1996–1997); WXRM (1997–1998); WOST (1998–2000); WKFF (2000–2001); WRLR (2001–2003); WCKT (2003–2007)
- Call sign meaning: "Jazz" (former format)

Technical information
- Licensing authority: FCC
- Facility ID: 35213
- Class: C1
- ERP: 84,000 watts
- HAAT: 323 meters (1,060 ft)

Links
- Public license information: Public file; LMS
- Webcast: Listen Live
- Website: magicftmyers.iheart.com

WZJZ (100.1 FM) is a commercial radio station licensed to Port Charlotte, Florida, and broadcasting to the Fort Myers–Southwest Florida media market. WZJZ is owned by iHeartMedia and airs a hybrid Latin pop and adult contemporary music format branded as "Magic 100.1".

The station's studios and offices are on Metro Parkway in Fort Myers, and its transmitter is off Horseshoe Road in Punta Gorda.

== History ==
=== Disco and smooth jazz ===
In 1976, the station first signed on at 100.1 MHz in Port Charlotte. It had the call sign WEEJ with an effective radiated power of 3,000 watts. It began with an all disco format. Through most of the 1980s it had an adult contemporary format until switching formats various times through the 1990s. In 2003, it took the callsign WCKT as "Cat Country 100."

On March 21, 2007, when it was a smooth jazz station, WZJZ moved from 107.1 FM to 100.1 FM, swapping frequencies with co-owned country music station WCKT. WCKT is now heard at 107.1, while WZJZ continues at 100.1. This gave WZJZ sizable signal improvements to the north of Fort Myers, going from Class A to Class C, while also reducing signal redundancy for the country format, as Clear Channel also owns another country station, 92.9 WIKX, in the Port Charlotte area.

=== Z100 ===
On March 29, 2009, at midnight, WZJZ began to repeatedly play the same portion of the song "I Like to Move It" by Reel 2 Real as a stunt in preparation for a format change. The new station was slated to be called Move 100.1. On March 30, 2009, WZJZ flipped to an upbeat rhythmic adult contemporary format and adopted the "Z100" moniker. Its logo was patterned after its Top 40 sister stations KKRZ in Portland, Oregon, and WHTZ in New York, New York.

=== Y100 ===
On July 25, 2011, after a weekend of stunting, WZJZ flipped to Top 40/CHR, using the moniker Y100, even though there is no "Y" in the call letters. The station's format and logo were patterned after its sister station in nearby Miami, WHYI, but customized for Southwest Floridians. The flip to Top 40 gave iHeartMedia two Top 40 stations in the Fort Myers market, along with rhythmic contemporary WBTT. In 2013, WZJZ once again switched its logo to match WHYI, but with some slight differences.

On March 24, 2016, at midnight, WZJZ tweaked its format to Hot AC and rebranded as "Y100.1".

=== Magic 100.1 ===
On January 12, 2024 at 5 a.m., after playing "Enemy" by Imagine Dragons, WZJZ shifted to a hybrid format consisting of both Spanish and English-language adult contemporary music (with the imaging of the station done entirely in Spanish), branded as "Magic 100.1" (the first song under the format being "The Best" by Tina Turner), mirroring a similar move at iHeart-owned WMIA-FM across the state in Miami; the move is an attempt to mimic the success WMIA had following its own launch the previous November.

== Previous logos ==
2003-2007 "Cat Country 100"

2011-2013 "Y100"

2013-2016 "Y100"

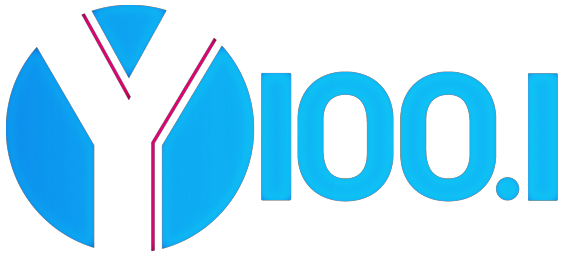
2016-2024 "Y100.1"
