= WCKT =

Coordinates: 26.317°N 81.787°W

- Lehigh Acres, Florida; United States
- Broadcast area: Fort Myers - Naples - Southwest Florida
- Frequency: 107.1 MHz (HD Radio)
- Branding: Cat Country 107.1

Programming
- Format: Country
- Affiliations: Premiere Networks

Ownership
- Owner: iHeartMedia, Inc.; (iHM Licenses, LLC)
- Sister stations: WBCG, WBTT, WCCF, WCVU, WIKX, WOLZ, WWCD, WZJZ

History
- First air date: January 1, 1976
- Former call signs: WAYK-FM (1976–1979); WSWF-FM (1979-1983); WOOJ-FM (1983–1989); WCKT (1989–2003); WRLR (2003); WDRR (2003–2004); WZJZ (2004–2007)
- Call sign meaning: sounds like "Cat"

Technical information
- Licensing authority: FCC
- Facility ID: 55755
- Class: C2
- ERP: 23,500 watts
- HAAT: 220 meters (720 ft)

Links
- Public license information: Public file; LMS
- Webcast: Listen live (via iHeartRadio)
- Website: catcountry1071.iheart.com

WCKT (107.1 FM) is a commercial radio station licensed to Lehigh Acres, Florida, and serving the Fort Myers-Naples area of Southwest Florida. It airs a country music format branded as "Cat Country" and is owned by iHeartMedia, Inc. In morning drive time, the station carries The Bobby Bones Show from Nashville. It airs The Boxer Show with Brandon Nasby from WCOL-FM Columbus in evenings. And overnight, After Midnite with Granger Smith is heard. WCKT's studios and offices are on Metro Parkway in Fort Myers.

WCKT is a Class C2 FM station. It has an effective radiated power (ERP) of 23,500 watts. The transmitter is off Old 41 Road at Channel 30 Drive in Bonita Springs.

== History ==
=== Beautiful music, Disco and Rock ===
The station signed on the air on January 1, 1976. Its call sign was WAYK-FM and it was owned by Broadcast Management, Inc., as the sister station to WAYK 1440 AM (now WWCL). At first, WAYK-FM was automated with a beautiful music format. It played quarter-hour sweeps of soft, mostly instrumental music and was an affiliate of the ABC Information Network. It was originally powered at just 2,350 watts, a fraction of its current output.

In the late 1970s, disco music was gaining in popularity. In 1979, the format was flipped to all-disco and the call letters were changed to WSWF-FM (standing for Southwest Florida). In 1985, the station flipped to album-oriented rock (AOR) and the call letters were changed to WOOJ (Orange Rock 107). In 1988, facing competition from a new and more powerful rock competitor, 96.1 WRXK, WOOJ tweaked its format to classic rock.

=== Cat Country ===
In 1989, the station changed to "Cat Country 107.1" and the call sign became WCKT. In only one ratings period, the new Cat Country beat longtime Southwest Florida country outlet 101.9 WHEW to become the area's #1 country station. WCKT programmed a music intensive format up against WHEW's more full service personality approach. WCKT 107.1 continued for several years until WHEW made a major change. It stayed country but become WWGR as "Gator Country 101.9" about the same time as the Ft. Myers and Naples markets were combined to become one radio market. Since then, WWGR has been the #1 country outlet in the Ft. Myers - Naples metro area.

In 1996, WCKT was acquired by Clear Channel Communications, which changed its name to iHeartMedia in 2014. During WCKT's history, Clear Channel briefly had the station on its 100.1 FM frequency (what is now WZJZ). Even though the 100.1 frequency is a stronger Class C1 signal, it is based in Port Charlotte. Its tower there didn't send a strong enough signal to cover the population living around Naples and Marco, on the southern end of the Fort Myers-Naples market.

In 2007, "Cat Country" returned to the 107.1 frequency. Over the years, it has gotten a boost in power and antenna height to better cover the spread-out Fort Myers radio market.

== Cat Country alumni ==
- "Super" Dave Logan
- Rick McGee (the first PD and longtime morning show host)
- Gator Michaels (later a record label executive)
- Barry "The Bear" Smith
- Doc Daily
- "Shotgun" Bob Walker (later PD at WCTK "Cat Country" Providence)
- Robin Wolf
- Holly Davidson (overnight DJ)
- Kerry Babb (former PD)
- Jeff "J.R." Reed
- Mark "The Shark" Wilson (former PD)
- Todd Nixon (former PD)
- Mike Tyler (former PD)
