= WIKX =

Radio stations in Charlotte Harbor, Florida

Coordinates: 26.897°N 82.241°W

- Charlotte Harbor, Florida; United States
- Broadcast area: Southwest Florida
- Frequency: 92.9 MHz
- Branding: Kix Country

Programming
- Format: Country
- Affiliations: Premiere Networks

Ownership
- Owner: iHeartMedia, Inc.; (iHM Licenses, LLC)
- Sister stations: WBCG, WBTT, WCCF, WCKT, WCVU, WOLZ, WWCD, WZJZ

History
- First air date: September 1, 1970
- Former call signs: WCCF-FM (1970–1979); WQLM (1979–1993)
- Call sign meaning: "Kix"

Technical information
- Licensing authority: FCC
- Facility ID: 28899
- Class: C1
- ERP: 100,000 watts
- HAAT: 246 meters (807 ft)

Links
- Public license information: Public file; LMS
- Webcast: Listen live (via iHeartRadio)
- Website: kixcountry929.iheart.com

WIKX (92.9 FM) is a commercial radio station licensed to Charlotte Harbor, Florida, and serving Charlotte County in Southwest Florida. It broadcasts a country music format branded as "Kix Country". The station is owned by iHeartMedia with studios on Tiseo Boulevard, off Kings Highway in Port Charlotte.

WIKX is a Class C1 FM station. It has an effective radiated power (ERP) of 100,000 watts, the maximum for most FM stations. The transmitter is near Redwood Road in Rotonda Lakes. The signal stretches from Sarasota to the north, down to Fort Myers to the south.

== History ==
The station signed on the air on September 1, 1970. The original call sign was WCCF-FM, the sister station to WCCF 1580 AM. WCCF-FM transmitted at 92.7 MHz and its city of license was Punta Gorda. It broadcast at 3,000 watts, a fraction of its current output. With the low power, WCCF-FM could only be heard in Punta Gorda and nearby communities.

At first, WCCF-FM simulcast the same programming as WCCF 1580 AM. But after a few years, it had its own format. It was automated and played beautiful music, consisting of quarter-hour sweeps of soft instrumentals. In the late 1970s, the station began adding some mellow vocals to the instrumental music and made the transition to easy listening. It changed its call letters to WQLM but was still co-owned with WCCF.

The 1990s brought some big changes to WQLM. It flipped to country music as WIKX. It moved up the dial to 92.9 MHz, which also brought a substantial boost in power to 50,000 watts. And in 1999, WIKX and WCCF were acquired by San Antonio-based Clear Channel Communications.

In the early 2000s, WIKX doubled its power to 100,000 watts and changed its city of license to Charlotte Harbor. In 2014, Clear Channel changed its name to iHeartMedia, Inc.
