= 2003 in the environment =

This is a list of notable events relating to the environment in 2003. They relate to environmental law, conservation, environmentalism and environmental issues.

== Events ==
- An aerial spraying program was carried out in Hamilton, New Zealand to eradicate the invasive gypsy moth.
- First San Francisco Ocean Film Festival.
- First Festival of Nature in Britain.
- A number of protected areas were established in 2003, including Algoma Headwaters Provincial Park in Canada, and Black Bulga State Conservation Area in Australia.
- A number of protected areas were established in 2003, including Djebel Aissa National Park in Algeria, which is of particular importance in preserving the ecosystem of the Hauts Plateaux.

=== February ===
- The European Waste Electrical and Electronic Equipment Directive and the Restriction of Hazardous Substances Directive are adopted.

=== May ===
- The Dairying and Clean Streams Accord is signed in New Zealand between Fonterra, Ministry for the Environment, Ministry of Agriculture and Forestry and regional councils.

=== June ===
- Al-Mishraq, a state run sulfur plant near Mosul in Iraq, was the site of the largest recorded human-made release of sulfur dioxide when a fire (thought to have been deliberately started) gained control and burned for almost a month.

=== September ===
- The Cartagena Protocol on Biosafety enters into force. It is an international agreement on biosafety as a supplement to the Convention on Biological Diversity. The Biosafety Protocol seeks to protect biological diversity from the potential risks posed by living modified organisms resulting from modern biotechnology.
- The California Electronic Waste Recycling Act is signed into law in the United States.

=== October ===
- The Protocol to the 1979 Convention on Long-Range Transboundary Air Pollution on Persistent Organic Pollutants comes into force. It is an agreement to provide for the control and reduction of emissions of persistent organic pollutants (POPs) in order to reduce their transboundary fluxes so as to protect human health and the environment from adverse effects.
- Permission was granted by the Uruguay government to build a pulp mill on the Uruguay River. Concerns about water pollution lead to protests and the Pulp Mills on the River Uruguay (Argentina v. Uruguay) case brought before the International Court of Justice. The Uruguay River pulp mill dispute was eventually resolved in 2010.

=== December ===
- Plans to build new runways in the United Kingdom at Stansted Airport in Essex and a short-haul runway at Heathrow Airport spark anger from environmental groups.
- An agreement was reached between the US states of Illinois and Arkansas to address pollution levels of the Illinois River.

== See also ==
- Human impact on the environment
- List of years in the environment
