= WWCD (AM) =

- Solana, Florida; United States
- Broadcast area: Charlotte County; Southwest Florida
- Frequency: 1070 kHz
- Branding: 1070 The Zone

Programming
- Format: Sports
- Affiliations: Fox Sports Radio; Tampa Bay Lightning

Ownership
- Owner: iHeartMedia, Inc.; (iHM Licenses, LLC)
- Sister stations: WBCG, WBTT, WCCF, WCKT, WCVU, WIKX, WOLZ, WZJZ

History
- First air date: November 19, 1986
- Former call signs: WKII (1985–2024)

Technical information
- Licensing authority: FCC
- Facility ID: 35214
- Class: B
- Power: 1,800 watts (day); 233 watts (night)
- Transmitter coordinates: 26°53′38.20″N 82°3′2.30″W

Links
- Public license information: Public file; LMS
- Webcast: Listen live (via iHeartRadio)
- Website: 1070thezone.iheart.com

WWCD (1070 AM "The Zone") is a commercial radio station licensed to Solana, Florida, United States, serving Charlotte County in Southwest Florida, but can be heard as far north as Sarasota and as far south as Marco Island. Owned by iHeartMedia, Inc., it features a sports format with programming from Fox Sports Radio, along with Tampa Bay Lightning games.

== History ==
The station signed on the air on November 19, 1986. Its call sign was WKII and it was owned by Kneller Broadcasting of Charlotte County.

Under the leadership of Kneller Broadcasting, WKII was a full service radio station with major community involvement. It aired a middle of the road (MOR) format with local news and sports. Former air personalities include Jack Mihall, Charlie Shoe and Larry Timko.

In 1997, WKII and its co-owned FM station, 100.1 WCKT (now WZJZ) were acquired by San Antonio-based Clear Channel Communications (now known as iHeartMedia). WKII had an adult standards format.
