= Dwayne O. Andreas School of Law =

Private law school in Orlando, Florida, US

- Established: 1999
- School type: Private
- Parent endowment: $28.959 million
- Dean: Leticia Diaz
- Location: Orlando, Florida, U.S. 28°34′1.5″N 81°18′4.7″W
- Enrollment: 753
- Faculty: 56
- USNWR ranking: 178-195
- Bar pass rate: 65.9% (Florida bar exam, July 2025 first-time takers)
- Website: www.barry.edu/en/academics/law/

The Dwayne O. Andreas School of Law (also known as Barry Law) is located in Orlando, Florida. The school is an academic college of Barry University in Miami Shores, Florida. Barry Law offers various programs for full-time and part-time students, including a three-year daytime program and a four-year extended studies program in the evening for working students.

In 2024, Barry University School of Law had a 75.3 percent bar passage rate, with 119 of 158 applicants passing. The 2024 class had a median LSAT of 150 and a median GPA of 3.23, with the school having a 60.20% acceptance rate and an enrollment rate from those accepted of 28.42%.

== Campus ==
The Dwayne O. Andreas School of Law is situated on a 20-acre (81,000 m^{2}) campus in Orange County, Florida directly east of the Orlando city limits and is located about a 15-minute drive from the Orlando downtown core.

The School of Law facilities includes the Dwayne O. Andreas Law Center Building, the Legal Advocacy Center, the Moot Court Building, a faculty office building, the Euliano Law Library, cafe, and buildings housing the school's legal clinic and bookstore. There is no campus housing.

== History ==
The current school of law was originally established as one of the three colleges of the University of Orlando (originally chartered under the name of Florida Technical University), the other two schools being graduate programs in business and education, the university had no undergraduate students. The founder and first president of the University of Orlando was Dr. Neil R. Euliano who was at the time the owner of the for-profit Florida Technical College based in Orlando. Euliano, who had operated for-profit trade schools starting in 1982, established the non-profit University of Orlando in 1993 and its law school in 1995. The University of Orlando started its inaugural law school class on September 18, 1995. The first year the law school had only evening and weekend courses and a full-time faculty of four professors. The charter class began their studies at the for-profit Florida Technical College's campus. University of Central Florida faculty member Leland McKee was retained by Euliano to establish the law school's first committee and board of business and political leaders in the Orlando community.

The law school applied for A.B.A. accreditation in 1998. The A.B.A. visited the law school campus on March 1, 1998. Later in March 1998, the board of trustees removed the law school's Dean, Wallace M. Rudolph and appointed Stanley M. Talcott, a faculty member, as the law school's third dean. In July 1998 the A.B.A. denied the law school's application for accreditation.

Euliano resigned from the University of Orlando in September 1998, after a consultant concluded that its law school would stand a better chance of getting accredited if he left. Euliano was advised that his dual role as the school's main financial backer and the university's president may be as a conflict of interest. The dean of the university's business school, Dr. James L. Chase, was appointed to serve as the university's interim president.

Euliano began approaching several institutions about buying the University of Orlando. Among the schools Euliano solicited were Barry University, the University of Central Florida and Rollins College. In December 1998, Barry University of Miami Shores, Florida announced its intent to acquire University of Orlando by March 15, 1999. In March 1999 the law school was renamed Barry University of Orlando School of Law, the University of Orlando's board of trustees was disbanded and a new board of trustees was appointed for the law school. The University of Orlando graduate business school was dissolved and the graduate school of education was folded into Barry University's School of Adult and Continuing Education.

Sister Peggy Albert, O.P. assistant president of Barry University, moved from Barry's Miami Shores campus to Orlando, where she served as the law school's chief administrator.

On January 15, 2000, Barry University of Orlando School of Law had its first commencement of 17 graduates.

Barry University of Orlando School of Law reapplied for accreditation and received a new A.B.A. inspection in October 1999. On February 17, 2001, the A.B.A. Council for the Section on Legal Education and Admissions to the Bar rejected the school's second accreditation bid. On June 4, 2001, the A.B.A.'s Council for the Section on Legal Education refused Barry's request to reconsider the application that they, the council, rejected in February, 2001.

The Law School was fully incorporated into Barry University and became Barry University School of Law. The A.B.A. agreed to reconsider the October 2000 application however on December 3, 2001, the A.B.A. again rejected the school's accreditation. At this time the law school was renamed the Dwayne O. Andreas School of Law. On February 2, 2002, the American Bar Association's Council for the Section on Legal Education voted to grant Barry University School of Law provisional accreditation. The accreditation was ratified by a formal vote of approval from the A.B.A. House of Delegates on February 5, 2002.

On July 1, 2003, former Florida Coastal School of Law Dean J. Richard Hurt became the dean of Barry University's Dwayne O. Andreas School of Law.

On December 2, 2006, the Council for the Section on Legal Education voted to grant Barry University, Dwayne O. Andreas School of Law full accreditation.

== Degree information ==
The School of Law offers the Juris Doctor (J.D.) degree. The program consists of 90 semester-hours of study in areas that are essential to the understanding and practice of law.

== Ranking and employment outlook ==
As of 2024, U.S. News & World Report ranks Barry University School of Law as 178-195 in Best Law Schools. In 2023, 86.5% of students were employed at graduation.

== List of past and present deans ==
=== University of Orlando School of Law ===
Edward John Wherry (1995–1997)
Wallace M. Rudolph (January 1997-March 1998)
Stanley Talcott (March 1998-July 2003).

=== Barry University of Orlando School of Law ===
Stanley Talcott (March 1998-July 2003).

=== Barry University School of Law ===
Stanley Talcott (March 1998-July 2003)
Joseph Richard Hurt (July 2003-January 2007).

=== Dwayne O. Andreas School of Law ===
Joseph Richard Hurt (July 2003-January 2007)
Leticia Diaz (January 2007 – present).

== Notable faculty ==
Canadian lawyer and academic Faisal Kutty taught as a visitor.
