= WURH-LD =

Television station in Miami

- Miami, Florida; United States
- Channels: Digital: 29 (UHF), shared with WPBT and WXEL-TV; Virtual: 13
- Branding: The Health Channel

Programming
- Affiliations: 13.1: The Health Channel

Ownership
- Owner: South Florida PBS, Inc.
- Sister stations: WPBT, WXEL-TV

History
- First air date: October 16, 1990
- Former call signs: W25BF (1990–1997); WIMP-LP (1997–2001); WIMP-CA (2001–2011); WIMP-CD (2011–2017); WURH-CD (2017–2023)
- Former channel numbers: Analog: 25 (UHF, 1990–2011); Digital: 25 (UHF, 2011–2018); 18 (UHF, 2018–2019); Virtual: 25 (2011–2019)
- Former affiliations: HSN; ElementosTV; Cubana de Televisión

Technical information
- Licensing authority: FCC
- Facility ID: 4366
- Class: LD
- ERP: 1000 kW
- HAAT: 306 m (1,004 ft)
- Transmitter coordinates: 25°57′31″N 80°12′43″W
- Translator(s): W31DC-D 31 Fort Pierce

Links
- Public license information: LMS
- Website: allhealthtv.com

WURH-LD (channel 13) is a low-power television station in Miami, Florida, United States. Known as The Health Channel, it is owned by South Florida PBS and part of the multiplex containing WPBT (channel 2) and WXEL-TV (channel 42). The stations' transmitter is on Northwest 199th Street in Andover, Florida. Despite being legally licensed as a low powered station, it shares full power spectrum with WPBT, and WXEL-TV. Utilizing full coverage to the Miami-Dade market.

== History ==
On October 16, 1990, construction permit 890310UU became W25BF. On July 7, 1997, W25BF became WIMP-LP. WIMP became a Class A station on September 18, 2001, and became WIMP-CA as a result. After a flash-cut to digital TV while staying on physical channel 25, it became WIMP-CD in November 2011.

Then-owner Sunshine Broadcasting Company sold WIMP-CD's spectrum as part of the broadcast incentive auction, for $3,138,184. On December 15, 2017, Sunshine Broadcasting closed on the donation of the station to South Florida PBS, Inc. It planned to enter into a channel-sharing arrangement to operate the station on the spectrum allocated to their WPBT. The station changed its call sign to WURH-CD on December 27, 2017, and to WURH-LD on August 3, 2023, after South Florida PBS elected to revert the station to non–Class A status.

The station was previously affiliated with HSN and Elementos TV, a Hispanic TV network from Salt Lake City, Utah.

== Digital channel ==
WPBT, WXEL-TV, and WURH-LD are broadcast from a transmitter facility on Northwest 199th Street in Andover. The shared signal is multiplexed:

Subchannels of WPBT, WXEL-TV, and WURH-LD
License	Subchannel	Res.	Short name	Programming
WPBT	2.1	1080i	WPBT-HD	PBS
WPBT	2.2	480i	Create	Create
WPBT	2.3	480i	WPBTHC	The Health Channel
WPBT	2.4	480i	KIDS360	PBS Kids
WXEL-TV	42.1	1080i	WXEL-DT	PBS
WURH-LD	13.1	480i	WURH	The Health Channel
