= WOLZ =

- Fort Myers, Florida; United States
- Broadcast area: Southwest Florida
- Frequency: 95.3 MHz (HD Radio)
- Branding: 95.3 The Beach

Programming
- Format: Classic Hits
- Subchannels: HD2: WayFM Network (WAYJ)
- Affiliations: Premiere Networks

Ownership
- Owner: iHeartMedia, Inc.; (iHM Licenses, LLC)
- Sister stations: WBCG, WBTT, WCCF, WCKT, WCVU, WIKX, WWCD, WZJZ

History
- First air date: September 30, 1969
- Call sign meaning: Oldies (former format)

Technical information
- Licensing authority: FCC
- Facility ID: 13898
- Class: C1
- ERP: 79,000 watts
- HAAT: 145 meters (476 ft)
- Transmitter coordinates: 26°30′18.00″N 81°51′14.00″W
- Translator: HD2: 100.5 W263BI (Fort Myers)

Links
- Public license information: Public file; LMS
- Webcast: Listen live (via iHeartRadio)
- Website: 953beach.iheart.com

WOLZ (95.3 FM, "The Beach") is a commercial radio station licensed to Fort Myers, Florida, United States, and serving Southwest Florida. It airs a classic hits format and is owned by iHeartMedia, Inc.

WOLZ also broadcasts in HD Radio: its digital subchannel carries Christian Contemporary music from WAYJ n Naples, known as "Way FM", which feeds FM translator W263BI at 100.5 MHz in Fort Myers.

== History ==
The station signed on the air in September 30, 1959. Its original call sign was WFJY. For its early years, it was powered at only 1,500 watts, a fraction of its current output. It later was WSOR, a non-commercial station owned by the Riverside Baptist Church of Fort Myers. It aired a Christian radio format, mostly religious music with some preaching shows.

In the 1980s, it was acquired by the Heritage Broadcasting Company. It became a commercial station with an oldies format. The call letters WOLZ were chosen to represent the word oldies. Heritage applied to the Federal Communications Commission (FCC) to boost the power to 100,000 watts. That would allow WOLZ to be heard around much of Southwest Florida, including Fort Myers and Marco Island. In the 2000s, as the station shifted from oldies to classic hits, the branding avoided the word "oldies." In 2016, the station rebranded from "95.3 The River" to "95.3 OLZ." The playlist deleted early 1960s music, concentrating on the 70s and early 80s.

On May 28, 2021, WOLZ rebranded from "95.3 OLZ" to "95.3 The Beach." The playlist shifted to more 80s music with some 70s and 90s titles.
