= WFLV =

Radio station in West Palm Beach, Florida, U.S.

- West Palm Beach, Florida; United States
- Broadcast area: West Palm Beach, Florida
- Frequency: 90.7 MHz (HD Radio)
- Branding: K-Love

Programming
- Language: English
- Format: Contemporary Christian
- Subchannels: HD2: Public radio (WLRN-FM); HD3: Air1 (Contemporary worship music)
- Network: K-Love

Ownership
- Owner: Educational Media Foundation
- Sister stations: WMLV; WDLV

History
- First air date: November 24, 1969
- Former call signs: WHRS-FM (1969–1985); WXEL (1985–2011); WPBI (2011–2015)
- Call sign meaning: Florida Love

Technical information
- Licensing authority: FCC
- Facility ID: 58363
- Class: C1
- ERP: 38,000 watts
- HAAT: 340 meters (1,120 ft)
- Transmitter coordinates: 26°35′21.2″N 80°12′43.2″W
- Translators: HD2: 101.9 W270AD (West Palm Beach); HD3: 91.5 W218CW (West Palm Beach)

Links
- Public license information: Public file; LMS
- Webcast: Listen live; Listen live (via iHeartRadio); HD2: Listen live; Listen live (via iHeartRadio); HD3: Listen live
- Website: www.klove.com; HD2: www.air1.com; HD3: www.familyradio.org

WFLV (90.7 FM) is a contemporary Christian formatted radio station in West Palm Beach, Florida, United States, owned by the Educational Media Foundation and branded K-Love. The transmitter is in west of U.S. Route 441 in Lake Worth.

WFLV broadcasts in the HD Radio (digital) format. The HD-2 channel carries contemporary worship music, branded Air1, The HD-3 channel carries Christian radio format, branded Family Radio.

== History ==
The station signed on in 1969 as WHRS-FM, an outreach of the School District of Palm Beach County to the large number of migrant families in the Palm Beaches. (Its calls represented one of its public schools, Hagen Road Elementary School.) It joined the then-new National Public Radio (NPR) network in 1972. Originally airing a mix of classical music and fine arts programming with Spanish and bilingual programming in the mornings, it gradually evolved into a typical NPR classical music and fine arts station. In 1981, WHRS was sold to South Florida Public Telecommunications, the community group that owned the license for the area's new PBS station, WWPF-TV, which changed its calls to WHRS-TV before signing on in 1982. In 1985, the two stations changed their call letters to WXEL and WXEL-TV. Barry University bought the stations in 1997.

In April 2005, Barry announced a pending purchase of both WXEL and WXEL-TV to a group consisting of Educational Broadcasting Corporation (owners of New York City's WNET and WLIW) and the Community Broadcast Foundation of Palm Beach and the Treasure Coast, a local volunteer organization. Barry University decided to terminate the sale in May 2008.

Another deal to sell WXEL radio, this time to American Public Media (APM), doing business as Classical South Florida, was reached on April 20, 2010, after receiving approval from the station's trustees. The sale closed on May 25, 2011, and, as WXEL-TV was not included in the deal, the call letters of the radio station were changed to WPBI. APM operated the station as a full-time satellite of its Miami station, WKCP.

With the sale, all NPR news programming moved to WPBI's HD Radio subchannel. A low-power translator, W270AD in West Palm Beach, relays the subchannel's schedule; it had previously been used to simulcast WKCP. Most of the market gets at least grade B coverage from WLRN-FM in Miami or WQCS in Fort Pierce.

On July 17, 2015, Classical South Florida's stations, including WPBI, were sold to Educational Media Foundation (EMF) and switched to EMF's contemporary Christian network, K-Love; WPBI's call sign changed was changed to WFLV. WFLV-HD2 and W270AD continued to run NPR news and talk. On October 16, 2015, it was announced that Miami-Dade County Public Schools–owned WLRN-FM would lease WFLV-HD2 and W270AD from EMF and relaunch "WPBI News" that November as "101.9, NPR For The Palm Beaches". EMF's purchase of WFLV, along with co-owned WDLV, WMLV, W214BD, and W270AD, was consummated on November 2, 2015, at a price of $21.7 million.
