= WCCF (AM) =

Radio station in Punta Gorda, Florida

- Punta Gorda, Florida; United States
- Broadcast area: Charlotte County, Florida
- Frequency: 1580 kHz
- Branding: WCCF News Radio

Programming
- Format: Talk radio
- Network: Fox News Radio
- Affiliations: Compass Media Networks; Genesis Communications Network; Premiere Networks; Radio America; USA Radio Network; Westwood One; Tampa Bay Buccaneers; Tampa Bay Rays

Ownership
- Owner: iHeartMedia, Inc.; (iHM Licenses, LLC)
- Sister stations: WBCG, WBTT, WCKT, WCVU, WIKX, WOLZ, WWCD, WZJZ

History
- First air date: September 15, 1961; 64 years ago
- Call sign meaning: Charlotte County, Florida

Technical information
- Licensing authority: FCC
- Facility ID: 28897
- Class: B
- Power: 1,250 watts days; 110 watts nights
- Transmitter coordinates: 26°53′37.00″N 82°3′3.00″W
- Translator: 100.9 W265EA (Punta Gorda)

Links
- Public license information: Public file; LMS
- Webcast: Listen live (via iHeartRadio)
- Website: wccfam.iheart.com

WCCF (1580 kHz) is a commercial AM radio station broadcasting a talk radio format. It is licensed to Punta Gorda, Florida, and is owned by iHeartMedia, Inc. The studios and offices are on Tiseo Boulevard in Port Charlotte.

By day, WCCF is powered at 1,250 watts. As 1580 AM is a Canadian clear channel frequency, WCCF reduces power at night to 110 watts to avoid interference. It uses a non-directional antenna at all times. The transmitter is off Deltona Drive in Charlotte Park. Programming is also heard on 250-watt FM translator W265EA at 100.9 MHz.

== Programming ==
WCCF has one local program on weekdays, Charlotte County Speaks with Ken Lovejoy in late mornings. The rest of the schedule features nationally syndicated programs: The Clay Travis and Buck Sexton Show, The Dana Loesch Show, The Jesse Kelly Show, The Chad Benson Show, Coast to Coast AM with George Noory and This Morning, America's First News with Gordon Deal.

For live sports, WCCF carries Tampa Bay Buccaneers football and Tampa Bay Rays baseball games. Most hours begin with an update from Fox News Radio.

WCCF logo until 2019

== History ==
The station signed on the air on September 15, 1961. It originally was a daytimer, required to go off the air at night. In the 1970s, WCCF was a country music station. It carried news updates from the Mutual Broadcasting System.

In 1970, it gained a sister station. WCCF-FM debuted, airing a beautiful music format on 92.7 MHz. Today, that station is a different talk outlet, 92.5 WFSX-FM in Estero.
