= South Florida PBS =

Public broadcasting organization in Florida, United States

South Florida PBS, Inc. is a non-profit organization which owns the two largest public television stations in South Florida, WPBT in Miami and WXEL-TV in West Palm Beach. It also owns WURH-LD, a commercial station donated by their owners to the organization in the fall of 2017 which shares WPBT's spectrum as part of a channel sharing arrangement.

The company was formed from a 2015 merger of the Community Television Foundation of South Florida, owner of WPBT, and WXEL Public Broadcasting Corporation, owner of WXEL. The merger, which was formally filed with the FCC on July 16, would enable the two stations to pool resources and fundraising efforts to offer more program content. However, the two stations have separate governing boards and conduct separate fundraising efforts.

Between them, the two stations serve a potential audience of over six million people from the Treasure Coast to the Florida Keys. The two stations have long had significant overlap in the three largest counties in their service area–Palm Beach, Broward and Miami-Dade. Despite the presence of WXEL, WPBT long claimed the Palm Beaches as part of its primary coverage area.
