= Wildlife Conservation Film Festival =

- Location: New York City
- Founded: 2010
- Founded by: Christopher J. Gervais
- No. of films: 70+
- Website: http://www.wcff.org/

Wildlife Conservation Film Festival (WCFF) is an international film festival based in New York, that promotes and produces interactive events around independent films that promote sustainability and the conservation of biodiversity.

== History ==
The Wildlife Conservation Film Festival was founded in 2010 by Christopher J. Gervais as a 2-day event and has since grown to a 10-day festival. It is a juried event and attendees and participants are international wildlife conservationists, filmmakers, photographers, scientists and people across the globe that work toward the preservation of global biodiversity. It has grown into an educational conference. In 2016 WCFF announced that DDB Worldwide (New York) will be partnering with them on a pro bono basis in order to further their exposure.
