= International Ocean Film Festival =

American annual film festival

- Location: San Francisco, California, United States
- Language: International
- Website: https://intloceanfilmfest.org/

The International Ocean Film Festival (IOFF), formerly the San Francisco Ocean Film Festival, is a film festival held in San Francisco, CA, since 2004; it features films about marine life, the ocean, coastal cultures and conservation.

Celebrating its 10th edition in 2013, this is the first dedicated Ocean Film Festival in North America and the second in the world after the acclaimed Festival International du Film Maritime, exploration et l'environnement, in Toulon, France, founded in 1954. The IOFF has become the premier venue for international marine filmmakers to screen their works to a growing North American audience and has inspired the creation of several other ocean film festivals in the US, including the Blue Ocean Film Festival.

All films selected for the festival are eligible to compete for awards in Adventure, Coastal Culture, Environment, Conservation, Short Film, and Wildlife categories.

== History ==
The International Ocean Film Festival was founded in 2004 and is a volunteer-driven 501(c)3 non-profit organization.

In 2005, the San Francisco Examiner noted: "[In 2004, the] San Francisco Ocean Film Festival was such a success that its organizers are doing it again this weekend. Roughly 1,500 people turned out for the weekend-long series of maritime-related films. And the festival, the first of its kind in the U.S., inspired ocean lovers in Southern California and Hawaii to organize their own, scaled-down versions. ... The call for entries remained intentionally vague again this year so as to capture a broad spectrum of themes, from conservation to recreation. That, coupled with the word of mouth generated by the success of last year's event, resulted in Jake and his small army of dedicated volunteers being inundated with submissions, roughly three times as many as last year "If you want to know about what’s happening to oceans around the world, you can read about it in newspapers or research it on the Internet. Or, Ana Blanco would say, you could attend the San Francisco International Ocean Film Festival, now in its 11th year. ...", wrote the same newspaper in 2006.

The 2013 event took place from March 7–10, 2013, at Theater 39 on Pier 39 and featured a multimedia presentation by Jean-Michel Cousteau at the opening gala.

== Awards ==
The IOFF has offered a different program each year. Past award winners have included:

Wildlife Film: Sex under the Sea (Belgium), Etienne Verhaegen; Giants of the Dee (Germany), Ralf Kiefner & Andrea Ramalho

Adventure Film: Rescue Men: The Story of the Pea Island Surfmen (USA), Allan Smith; Come Hell or High Water (USA), Keith Malloy

Animated Film: I’m Going to Bite Someone (USA), Steve Dildarian

Coastal Culture Film: Papa Mau (USA), Na’alehu Anthony; The Giant and the Fisherman (Italy), Manfred Bortoli

Environmental Film: Sanctuary in the Sea (USA), Robert Talbot; Plastic Paradise – The Great Pacific Garbage Patch (USA), Angela Sun

Conservation Film: In the Wake of Giants (USA), Lou Douros; Saving the Ocean – The Sacred Islands (USA), John Angier

Short Film: The Krill is Gone (USA), Jeffrey Bost & Matt Briggs; Sinistre – (Indonesia), Jose Lachat

== Education program ==
The International Ocean Film Festival creates and gives student and family programs to educate themselves about ocean conservation, inspire viewers to make their own films, and encourage advocacy for the protection of ocean ecosystems. The 2011 student program took place from March 9–11, screening a dozen films and hosting a range of guest speakers for middle and high school student audiences from public, private, and home schools. The three days of free programming included free tours of the Aquarium of the Bay, as well as curriculum support and study guides relating to IOFF films.

Reservations are required for the IOFF education program.

Past Student Festival Films
Amazing Jellies
In the Wake of Giants
Kilauea Sea Turtles
Monsterboards
One River
Save Sharks Don’t Serve Them
The Coral Gardener
The Bay Vs. The Bag
The Krill Is Gone
The Majestic Plastic Bag
The Ocean Zone (Student Film)
Yao Ming Shark Fin Soup
Connection
Gigantic Jenga
The Great Huki
Ocean Oases: Protecting Seamounts and Canyons of the Atlantic
Pacific Drifters
Plastic Tide
Whale Disentanglement Network
The Mermaid – A Story of Restoration (2012 winner)

The family program, directed to a younger audience, was held over two days, from March 12–13, 2011, with discounted admission. The films shown at family festival include:

2011 Family Festival Films
Abby Sunderland Sets Sail
Amazing Jellies
Birdathlon
Chasing the Swell
Home for Hawksbill
Killer Whales
Physics of Surfing
Raja Ampat
The Bay vs The Bag
The Coral Gardener
Willem and the Whales

== See also ==
- 2003 in the environment
