= Barry University =

Catholic university in Miami Shores, Florida, US

- Former name: Barry College (1940–1981)
- Type: Private university
- Established: 1940; 86 years ago
- Accreditation: SACS
- Religious affiliation: Catholic (Dominican Order)
- Academic affiliations: ACCU; CIC; ICUF; NAICU
- Endowment: $62.7 million (2025)
- President: Mike Allen
- Faculty: 255 (full-time), 647 (part-time)
- Students: 6,825 (fall 2024)
- Undergraduates: 3,232 (fall 2024)
- Postgraduates: 3,593 (fall 2024)
- Location: Miami Shores, Florida, United States; 25°52′43.81″N 80°11′50.17″W
- Campus: 122 acres (0.49 km^{2}); Large suburb
- Other campuses: Hollywood; Miami; Tallahassee; Ocala; Orlando; Palm Beach Gardens; Pembroke Pines
- Newspaper: The Buccaneer
- Colors: Red, black, and silver
- Nickname: Buccaneers
- Sporting affiliations: NCAA Division II – Sunshine State
- Mascot: Bucky the Parrot
- Website: barry.edu
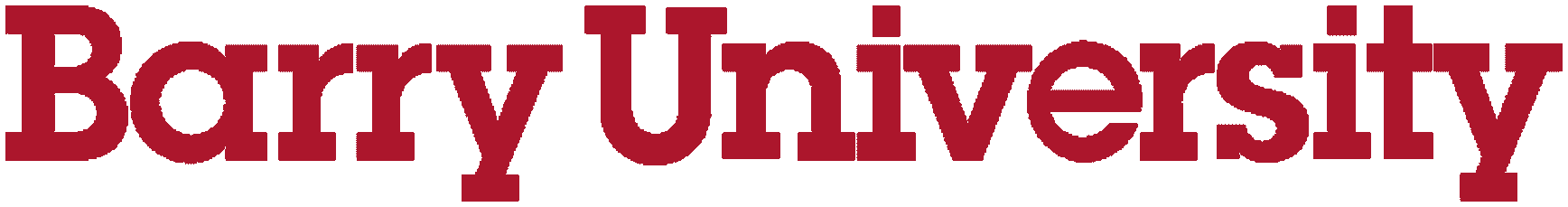

Barry University is a private Catholic university in Miami Shores, Florida, United States. Founded in 1940 by the Adrian Dominican Sisters, it is one of the largest Catholic universities in the Southeast and is located within the Archdiocese of Miami.

The university offers more than 100 degree programs, from bachelors to doctorate, in six schools and two colleges. Barry University has almost 7,000 students, a campus of 54 buildings, a branch campus in Tallahassee, a law school in Orlando, and 50,000 alumni.

== History ==
=== Beginnings ===
Barry College was founded as a women's college by a pair of siblings: Patrick Barry, Bishop of St. Augustine, and his sister, Mary Gerald Barry, OP, then prioress of the Adrian Dominican Sisters. The construction of what was then the Barry College for Women began in 1940, in what had previously been "a tract of tropical vegetation". The empty lot was soon transformed into the main campus in Miami Shores, Florida. The original campus consisted of five buildings. Mother Barry served as president from 1940 to 1961.

Barry College became Barry University on November 13, 1981. Barry University continues to be sponsored by the Dominican Sisters of Adrian, Michigan. It is an independent 501(c)(3) organization and has an independent board of trustees.

=== Presidents ===
The university has had six Adrian Dominican Sisters serve as president since its inception: M. Gerald Barry, 1940–61; M. Genevieve Weber, 1962–63; M. Dorothy Browne, 1963–74; M. Trinita Flood, 1974–81; Jeanne O'Laughlin, 1981–2004; and Linda Bevilacqua, 2004–2019. Mike Allen began his tenure as the seventh president of Barry University on July 1, 2019. He is the first man and lay person to lead Barry University since its founding in 1940. The motherhouse of the sisters is in Adrian, Michigan.

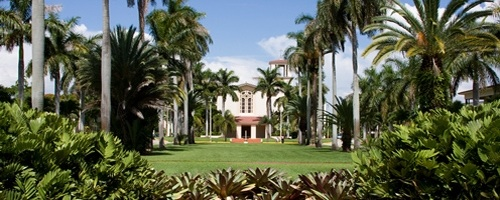
Cor Jesu Chapel

=== Cor Jesu Chapel ===
The Cor Jesu ("Heart of Jesus") Chapel is intended to be the spiritual and physical heart of the campus. It was financed with the aid of Margaret Brady Farrell, a parishioner of St. Patrick's Church in Miami Beach. Soon after discovering that the construction of the Cor Jesu was postponed due to insufficient funds, Farrell donated all the funds needed for completion the chapel's construction. In her honor, the Division of Business and Finance building was dedicated as "Farrell House". The chapel is topped by an 80-foot (24 m) tower holding carillon chimes. It seats 500 persons. Traces of Romanesque architecture can be seen in the inside of the chapel which "was built in choir style with wood wainscoting and a canopy over the altar". A stained-glass window of amber color, containing the image of a Celtic cross, is visible from the main entrance of the campus.

== Facilities ==
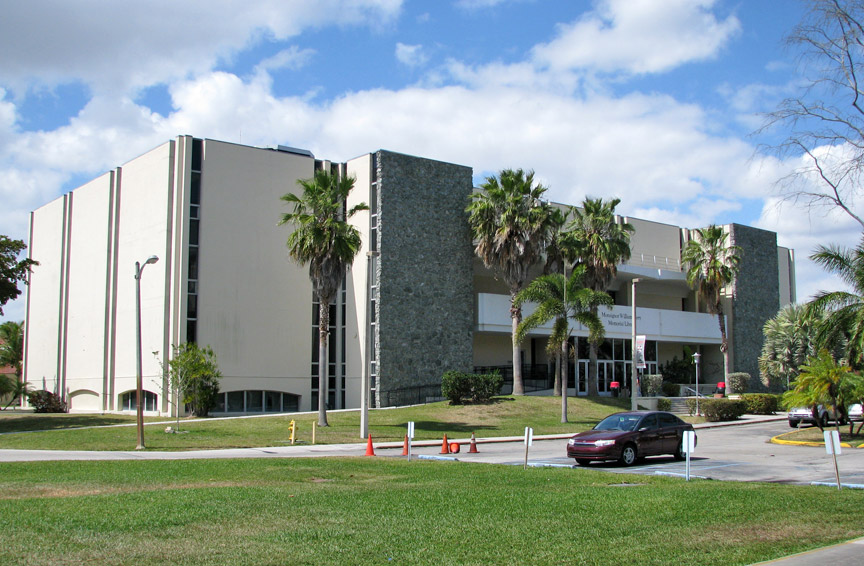
Monsignor William Barry Memorial Library

Barry University's main campus is in Miami Shores, Florida. While the main campus is in Miami Shores, Barry University offers several continuing adult education classes at other locations in Florida. Barry University has a campus in Orlando containing the Dwayne O. Andreas School of Law.

There are more than 40 buildings at the Miami Shores campus. These contain technology laboratories and indoor and outdoor sporting facilities.

The Monsignor William Barry Memorial Library contains more than 710,000 items, including 2,600 periodical titles, 5,000 audiovisual items, 150 electronic databases, and an "excellent Catholic American collection". The library also contains a collection of documents pertaining to Operation Pedro Pan.

=== Expansion ===
While Barry University is primarily a liberal arts college, the university has expanded its programs of study to include specialized programs in nursing, teacher education, medical technology, and social work.

Barry began graduate programs for men and women in 1954, a continuing education program in 1974, a school of business in 1976, a division of biological and biomedical sciences in 1983, and a school of podiatric medicine in fall 1985.

In 1999, the Barry University School of Law was established in Orlando, Florida. Barry University's law school is named the Dwayne O. Andreas School of Law.

== Academics ==
Barry University offers more than 50 traditional undergraduate programs, accelerated bachelor's programs designed specifically for working adults, and more than 40 graduate programs (many of these with evening/weekend classes) in 9 schools. As of 2019, student to faculty ratio was 12:1.

=== Schools and colleges ===
- School of Arts and Sciences
- Andreas School of Business
- Adrian Dominican School of Education (ADSOE)
- Dwayne O. Andreas School of Law (Orlando)
- College of Health Professions and Medical Sciences
- Barry University School of Podiatric Medicine
- School of Professional and Career Education
- School of Social Work

=== Rankings ===
Forbes' 2015 ranking listed Barry University 615th on their list of America's Top Colleges. In 2022-23, Barry University was ranked #331-440 in the National Universities category by U.S. News & World Report.

== Student activities ==
=== Athletics ===
Barry University became a member of the Sunshine State Conference (SSC) in June 1988 and a member of NCAA Division II since 1984. The Buccaneers have won 16 NCAA Division II national championships (women's soccer 1989, 1992, 1993; volleyball 1995, 2001, 2004; men's golf 2007, 2013, 2014; men's tennis 2010, 2013, 2015; women's tennis 2011, 2014 and rowing 2015, 2016) and 65 SSC titles. The Bucs have produced 309 All-Americans and 361 Scholar All-Americans.

The SSC sponsors championships in 23 sports for men and women: baseball, men's and women's basketball, Beach Volleyball , men's and women's cross country, women’s Flag Football, men’s and women’s lacrosse, men's and women's golf, rowing, men's and women's soccer, softball, men’s and women’s swimming, men's and women's tennis, and men’s and women's volleyball.

Multiple alumni of Barry's baseball team have gone on to play Major League Baseball, including pitcher Henry Owens, catcher Yan Gomes, pitcher Tyler Kinley, and second baseman Alex De Goti. MLB pitcher Josh James also briefly attended Barry before transferring to Western Oklahoma State College.

=== Student organizations ===
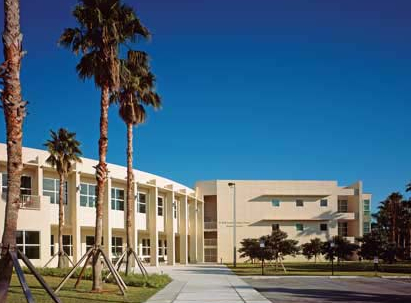
Landon Student Union

Barry University has more than 60 student organizations, two fraternities and one sorority, honor societies, and a student government.

=== Student media ===
The Barry Buccaneer is the student newspaper, ranging from 8 to 16 pages, and is published at the first of every month starting in September and ending in May. The Buccaneer serves as a laboratory for journalism minors. All work, including writing, editing, advertising and design, is completed by students.

WBUJ, 99.5 FM, is Barry University's student-run campus radio station. Sponsored by Barry's Department of Communications, WBUJ provides students the opportunity to gain knowledge of radio-industry practices and standards, hands-on technical skills, and marketable on-air experience. Student DJs cover a wide range of music genres, from hip hop and classic rock to classical music and blues. Other programming includes sports shows, talk shows, and daily news.

=== Campus ministry ===
Barry has a Department of Campus Ministry. The sacraments of the Catholic Church are administered in accordance with the guidelines of the Roman Catholic Archdiocese of Miami. Protestant and Catholic campus ministers are employed by the university. Protestant Communion is offered monthly in multi-faith services.

== Notable alumni ==
Name	Class year	Notability	References
Francisco de Borbón von Hardenberg	2001	relative of the Spanish royal family	
Alberto M. Carvalho	1990	Educator, superintendent of Miami-Dade County Public Schools	
Juju Casteneda	2017	Television personality, businessperson	
Alexander Dinelaris Jr.	Did not graduate	Screenwriter, playwright, producer	
Alex Ferrer	1983 (B.P.S.)	Television personality, lawyer, and retired judge who presided as the arbiter on Judge Alex	
Allyson Maynard Gibson	1975	Former attorney general of the Bahamas	
Yan Gomes	2009	First Brazilian-born player in Major League Baseball	
David Johnson	c. 1990	Photographer	
Tyler Kinley		Baseball player	
Laura Loomer	2015	Far-right and anti-Muslim political activist and conspiracy theorist	
Shaquille O'Neal	2012 (Ed.D.)	Former NBA player, rapper, actor, sports analyst	
Alberto Rojas	Did not graduate	Auxiliary bishop and Episcopal vicar for the Archdiocese of Chicago	
Joy Taylor	2009	Host of Skip and Shannon: Undisputed	
Saima Wazed		Bangladesh National Advisory Committee on Autism and Neurodevelopmental Disorders, member of World Health Organization Expert Advisory Panel on Mental Health, autism activist	

== See also ==
- Dwayne O. Andreas School of Law
- Independent Colleges and Universities of Florida
- WXEL-TV and WFLV
