= Solana, Florida =

- Census-designated place
- Location in Charlotte County and the state of Florida
- Coordinates: 26°56′20″N 82°01′40″W
- Country: United States
- State: Florida
- County: Charlotte

Area
  - Total: 1.64 sq mi (4.24 km^{2})
  - Land: 1.53 sq mi (3.97 km^{2})
  - Water: 0.10 sq mi (0.27 km^{2})
- Elevation: 26 ft (7.9 m)

Population (2020)
  - Total: 671
  - Density: 438.0/sq mi (169.11/km^{2})
- Time zone: UTC-5 (Eastern (EST))
  - Summer (DST): UTC-4 (EDT)
- ZIP code: 33950
- Area code: 941
- FIPS code: 12-66875
- GNIS feature ID: 2402864

Solana is an unincorporated community and census-designated place (CDP) in Charlotte County, Florida, United States. The population was 671 at the 2020 census, down from 742 at the 2010 census. It is part of the Punta Gorda, Florida Metropolitan Statistical Area, included in the North Port-Bradenton, Florida Combined Statistical Area.

== Geography ==
Solana is located on the eastern edge of Punta Gorda. It is bordered to the east by Interstate 75, with access from Exit 164 (U.S. Route 17). Via I-75 it is 26 miles (42 km) north of the Fort Myers area and 30 miles (48 km) southwest of the outskirts of Venice.

According to the United States Census Bureau, the Solana CDP has a total area of 1.7 square miles (4.3 km^{2}), of which 1.5 square miles (4.0 km^{2}) is land and 0.12 square miles (0.3 km^{2}), or 7.13%, is water.

== Demographics ==
Historical population
Census	Pop.	Note	%±
1990	1,128		—
2000	1,011		−10.4%
2010	742		−26.6%
2020	671		−9.6%
U.S. Decennial Census

As of the census of 2000, there were 1,011 people, 459 households, and 267 families residing in the CDP. The population density was 590.3 inhabitants per square mile (227.9/km^{2}). There were 563 housing units at an average density of 328.7 per square mile (126.9/km^{2}). The racial makeup of the CDP was 91.69% White, 5.44% African American, 0.20% Native American, 1.09% Asian, 0.49% from other races, and 1.09% from two or more races. Hispanic or Latino of any race were 2.37% of the population.

There were 459 households, out of which 18.5% had children under the age of 18 living with them, 40.3% were married couples living together, 12.0% had a female householder with no husband present, and 41.8% were non-families. 31.8% of all households were made up of individuals, and 13.5% had someone living alone who was 65 years of age or older. The average household size was 2.20 and the average family size was 2.69.

In the CDP, the population was spread out, with 18.2% under the age of 18, 9.1% from 18 to 24, 22.4% from 25 to 44, 26.9% from 45 to 64, and 23.4% who were 65 years of age or older. The median age was 45 years. For every 100 females, there were 101.4 males. For every 100 females age 18 and over, there were 101.7 males.

The median income for a household in the CDP was $23,472, and the median income for a family was $30,855. Males had a median income of $28,594 versus $20,726 for females. The per capita income for the CDP was $17,176. About 14.2% of families and 19.7% of the population were below the poverty line, including 48.5% of those under age 18 and none of those age 65 or over.
