= Classical South Florida =

Radio network serving South Florida, United States

Network logo

Classical South Florida was a radio network serving South Florida, owned by the American Public Media Group. Its stations carried classical music programming from American Public Media's Classical 24 service, as well as programs such as Performance Today, SymphonyCast, Pipedreams, and Saint Paul Sunday. Its stations were also affiliated with National Public Radio (NPR), carrying its hourly news bulletins. WPBI-HD2 and W270AD carried news and talk programming from NPR and other sources.

== Stations ==
- WKCP 89.7 MHz, Miami, Florida (now WMLV)
- WNPS 88.7 MHz, Fort Myers, Florida (now WDLV)
- WPBI 90.7 MHz, West Palm Beach, Florida (now WFLV)
  - W214BD 90.7 Gifford, Florida (Vero Beach, Florida)
  - W270AD 101.9 MHz, West Palm Beach, Florida (relayed WPBI-HD2 as "101.9 WPBI News")

With insufficient funding, the entire network was purchased by Educational Media Foundation for programming the CCM format, K-Love in July 2015. However, NPR's newscasts and its HD2 channel (which featured NPR's talk programming) continued on its West Palm Beach outlet, now WFLV. It has since been replaced by Air1.
