= Andover, Florida =

Andover
- Neighborhood of Miami Gardens
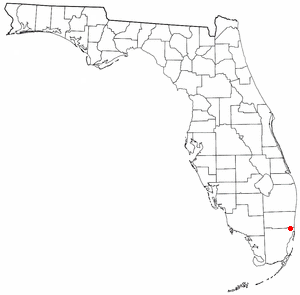
- Location in the state of Florida
- Coordinates: 25°57′58″N 80°12′19″W
- Country: United States
- State: Florida
- County: Miami-Dade
- City: Miami Gardens

Area
  - Total: 1.8 sq mi (4.6 km^{2})
  - Land: 1.7 sq mi (4.3 km^{2})
  - Water: 0.12 sq mi (0.3 km^{2})

Population (2000)
  - Total: 8,489
  - Density: 5,064/sq mi (1,955.4/km^{2})
- Time zone: UTC-5 (Eastern (EST))
  - Summer (DST): UTC-4 (EDT)
- ZIP codes: 33169, 33179
- FIPS code: 12-01315

Andover is a neighborhood in Miami Gardens, Florida. It was formerly a census-designated place. The population was 8,489 at the 2000 census. Transmitters for several Miami television stations are located in Andover.

== Geography ==
Andover is located at 25°57′58″N 80°12′19″W (25.966019, -80.205193).

According to the U.S. Census Bureau, the CDP has a total area of 4.6 km^{2} (1.8 sq mi). 4.4 km^{2} (1.7 sq mi) of it is land and 0.3 km^{2} (0.12 sq mi) of it (6.15%) is water.

== Demographics ==
Historical population
Census	Pop.	Note	%±
1990	6,251		—
2000	8,489		35.8%
U.S. Decennial Census; 1990 2000

=== 2000 census ===
Andover CDP, Florida – Racial and ethnic composition Note: the US Census treats Hispanic/Latino as an ethnic category. This table excludes Latinos from the racial categories and assigns them to a separate category. Hispanics/Latinos may be of any race.
Race / Ethnicity (NH = Non-Hispanic)	Pop 2000	% 2000
White alone (NH)	1,104	13.01%
Black or African American alone (NH)	5,843	68.83%
Native American or Alaska Native alone (NH)	14	0.16%
Asian alone (NH)	95	1.12%
Native Hawaiian or Pacific Islander alone (NH)	2	0.02%
Other race alone (NH)	23	0.27%
Mixed race or Multiracial (NH)	151	1.78%
Hispanic or Latino (any race)	1,257	14.81%
Total	8,489	100.00%

As of the census of 2000, there were 8,489 people, 3,472 households, and 2,131 families residing in the CDP. The population density was 1,951.0 people/km^{2} (5,053 people/mi^{2}). There were 3,956 housing units at an average density of 909.2 units/km^{2} (2,355 units/mi^{2}). The racial makeup of the CDP was 22.04% White (13% were Non-Hispanic White,) 70.97% African American, 0.27% Native American, 1.14% Asian, 0.02% Pacific Islander, 3.07% from other races, and 2.47% from two or more races. Hispanic or Latino of any race were 14.81% of the population.

There were 3,472 households, out of which 31.6% had children under the age of 18 living with them, 32.4% were married couples living together, 23.4% had a female householder with no husband present, and 38.6% were non-families. 33.6% of all households were made up of individuals, and 17.1% had someone living alone who was 65 years of age or older. The average household size was 2.44 and the average family size was 3.11.

In the CDP, the population was spread out, with 26.4% under the age of 18, 9.3% from 18 to 24, 30.6% from 25 to 44, 18.6% from 45 to 64, and 15.2% who were 65 years of age or older. The median age was 34 years. For every 100 females, there were 78.6 males. For every 100 females age 18 and over, there were 71.2 males.

The median income for a household in the CDP was $31,779, and the median income for a family was $41,367. Males had a median income of $30,660 versus $26,686 for females. The per capita income for the CDP was $17,798. About 11.5% of families and 15.8% of the population were below the poverty line, including 17.3% of those under age 18 and 27.7% of those age 65 or over.

As of 2000, before being annexed to Miami Gardens, English as a first language accounted for 74.96% of all residents, while Spanish accounted for 17.91%, French Creole accounted for 4.61%, French made up 1.58%, West African Niger-Congo languages (Kru, Igbo and Yoruba) were at 0.52%, and Yiddish was the mother tongue for 0.39% of the population.

== Education ==
Miami-Dade County Public Schools operates public schools in the area. Schools in the former CDP include:

- Andover Middle School
