= ABC 10 Miami =

ABC 10 Miami may refer to:

- WPLG (1961–2025; now an independent station)
- WPST-TV (1957–1961; now defunct)
