= ABC10 =

ABC 10 may refer to one of the following American Broadcasting Company-affiliated television stations in the US:

== Current affiliates ==
- KAKE in Wichita, Kansas
- KGTV in San Diego, California
- KTEN-DT3 in Ada, Oklahoma
- KXTV in Sacramento, California, which operates the abc10.com website
- WALB-DT2 in Albany, Georgia
- WBUP in Ishpeming, Michigan
- WDIO-DT in Duluth, Minnesota
- WJAR-DT2, a digital subchannel of WJAR in Providence, Rhode Island

== Formerly affiliated ==
- KOOL-TV (now KSAZ-TV) in Phoenix, Arizona (1954–1955)
- KOVT in Silver City, New Mexico (1987–2012; now defunct)
  - Was a re-broadcast of KOAT-TV in Albuquerque
- KRBB-TV/KTVE in El Dorado, Arkansas–Monroe, Louisiana (1955–1981)
- WPLG in Miami–Fort Lauderdale, Florida (1961–2025)
- WPST-TV in Miami, Florida (1957–1961; now defunct)
- WTSP in St. Petersburg, Florida (1965–1994)
