= KHWB =

KHWB may refer to:

- KHWB-LD, a low-power television station (channel 34, virtual 38) licensed to serve Eugene, Oregon, United States
- KIAH, a television station (channel 38, virtual 39) licensed to serve Houston, Texas, United States, which held call sign KHWB from 1999 to 2006
