= Calvin Hughes =

American journalist

Calvin Hughes is a news anchor on WPLG Local 10, in Miami, Florida, United States.

In mid-2010 Hughes moved form the morning and noontime anchor position to a nighttime co-anchor slot.

Hughes came to Local 10 in late 2006 from KYW-TV, the CBS station in Philadelphia, where he had been since November 2003 and anchored the weekend newscasts and served as a weekday night side reporter, covering several national stories, including the Live 8 Concert and Amish schoolhouse shootings. Hughes previously worked in Atlanta (WGCL-TV from 1999 to October 2002, where he worked with Jane Robelot), Dallas (KXAS-TV, 1995–99), Lexington, Kentucky (WKYT-TV), and Evansville, Indiana (WTVW), as an anchor and reporter. At 19, Hughes began reporting for the local radio station KBIA in Columbia, Missouri, while still a student at the University of Missouri, where he received a degree in journalism.

Hughes was born in Cleveland and also spent several years in East St. Louis, Illinois. In 2002, he was selected to run the relay leg of the Olympic torch as it passed through the streets of St. Louis, Missouri, headed for the winter games in Salt Lake City, Utah.

Hughes is a devoted father of three. He is divorced and lives in South Florida.
