= Eye Opener (American TV program) =

- Genre: Morning news program
- Created by: Lee Abrams
- Presented by: Laila Muhammad; Oliver Tull; Kevin Roth; Neeha Curtis; Hilary Kennedy; Allyn Hoang; Courtenay DeHoff
- Country of origin: United States
- Original language: English
- No. of seasons: 6

Production
- Executive producers: Raymond J. Brune (2011–2012); Justin Allen (2012–2016); Chris Myers (2016-2017)
- Production locations: Chicago, Illinois (2011–2012); Dallas, Texas (2012–2017)
- Camera setup: Multi-camera
- Running time: 180 minutes (weekday edition); 60 minutes (weekend editions)
- Production company: Tribune Broadcasting

Original release
- Network: Syndication
- Release: May 9, 2011 – June 21, 2017

Eye Opener (sometimes EyeOpener or Eye Opener TV) is an American syndicated morning news program produced by Nexstar Media Group that premiered on May 9, 2011, and ended on June 21, 2017. The program utilized a local/national hybrid format billed as a "provocative and unpredictable" combination of general and political news, health, entertainment, technology and opinion segments, mixed with humor and variety elements; stations carrying the program are given the option to provide news, weather and traffic inserts focusing on their local market each half-hour. At the show's conclusion, it was hosted by Laila Muhammad, Oliver Tull, Neeha Curtis, Hilary Kennedy, Allyn Hoang, Courtenay DeHoff and Kevin Roth, who was also the show's meteorologist.

== History ==
The idea for the program was conceived by Tribune Company chief innovation officer Lee Abrams (who resigned in October 2010). In the spring of 2011, Tribune Broadcasting developed a concept for a morning news program intended for stations owned by the company that did not maintain existing news departments. The program, which was given the title Eye Opener, would incorporate a local/national format (with the intent to syndicate the program to other markets) similar to that of morning news programs on the major broadcast television networks, with three-minute-long national segments conducted in a more free-form style. Steve Charlier, senior vice president of news at Tribune Broadcasting, described the program as a platform in which "comedy meets national news," designed to distinguish itself and stations carrying the program by offering a morning show that stands out from its traditionally formatted competitors.

The program debuted as a test run on May 9, 2011, on Tribune-owned CW affiliate KIAH in Houston, Texas – which maintained a news department, but only carried twice-daily evening newscasts – replacing syndicated programs and infomercials in the two-hour timeslot (from 6:00 to 8:00 a.m.); the program's national segments – originally hosted by Kirby O'Connell, Sean Dowling and Adam Lee Campbell – were initially produced in studio facilities at the Tribune Tower in Chicago, which also serves as the corporate headquarters for the Tribune Company. The program was originally hosted by Kirby O’Connell, Sean Dowling (who served as news anchor) and Adam Lee Campbell (who handled consumer, technology and pop culture-related reports), with the hosts appearing in more casual attire. In addition to news, health and parenting advice segments, the program initially also featured more irreverent and humorous features including a how-to segment conducted by a "hunky handyman" character named "Wrench," a commentary segment by Roger Lodge and a social media segment by "Monsignor Jebediah O'Flaherty," a character used as part of a segment lampooning celebrity tweets.

On October 31, 2011, production of the program's national segments was relocated to the studios of Tribune's Dallas CW affiliate, KDAF; the program largely overhauled its hosting staff with the relocation, with co-hosts Ellen Fox and Douglas Caballero, and sole holdover Dowling. The program concurrently began airing on KDAF and was also syndicated to fellow Tribune station, MyNetworkTV affiliate WPHL-TV in Philadelphia, later expanding to two of their sister stations – CW affiliates KRCW-TV in Portland and WSFL-TV in Miami (all three of which, unlike KDAF and KIAH, did not produce their own news programming) on January 2, 2012. These stations were chosen by Tribune for the initial national rollout of Eye Opener as they, as Charlier noted, "need to be growth markets" that also have a population skewing toward the program's 18-49 target audience, with plans to eventually syndicate the program to stations not owned by Tribune Broadcasting. By July 2012, in the Dallas, Philadelphia and Houston markets, Eye Opener saw an increase in viewers in the 25-54 demographic year-to-year in the program's scheduled time periods, whereas viewership in that demographic declined in Miami and Portland.

In September 2012, Eye Opener began airing on MyNetworkTV affiliates KXNW in Fort Smith, Arkansas (which Tribune earlier acquired in November 2011) and WWMB in Myrtle Beach, South Carolina. Eye Opener expanded to weekends on September 20, 2014, with the premiere of an hour-long edition of Saturday and Sunday mornings on KDAF and KIAH.

=== Replacement by Morning Dose ===
On June 15, 2017, Tribune Broadcasting announced the launch of Morning Dose, a two-hour social media-focused morning show produced in partnership with Chicago-based digital content branding agency Dose, which will replace Eye Opener on the five Tribune stations carrying the latter program (KDAF, KIAH, WDCW, KRCW and WPHL), along with the group's Miami CW affiliate, WSFL-TV, on June 29. Hosted by Melissa Rycroft and Gary Striewski, with news segments anchored by Laila Muhammad (along with Hillary Kennedy, the only announced holdovers from Eye Opener), the program featured a mix of news stories selected by Dose through its social storytelling and scientific trend methodology to "[showcase] the content and advancing the stories that will drive the day’s social conversation.” On September 6, 2018, Tribune announced that Morning Dose would be cancelled effective October 19.

== Affiliates ==
In August 2016, the Eye Opener website listed five stations, all of which are owned by Nexstar Media Group, that aired the program each weekday:

- WPHL-TV/Philadelphia, Pennsylvania (6:00-8:00 a.m. ET)
- WDCW/Washington, D.C. (6:00-8:00 a.m. ET)
- KDAF/Dallas, Texas (5:00-8:00 a.m. CT)
- KIAH/Houston, Texas (5:00-8:00 a.m. CT)
- KRCW-TV/Portland, Oregon (6:00-8:00 a.m. PT)

== See also ==
- NewsFix – a newsreel-style newscast airing on Tribune-owned KIAH in Houston and KDAF in Dallas-Fort Worth.
- The Daily Buzz – a similar syndicated morning program that ran from 2002 to 2015.
- Independent Network News – a syndicated daily news program produced by Tribune that ran from 1980 to 1990, later known under the title USA Tonight.
