= Megan Glaros =

American meteorologist

- Born: Dyer, Indiana
- Education: Lake Central High School; Texas Christian University; Indiana University
- Occupations: Meteorologist; Reporter
- Years active: 2002-present
- Known for: Morning weather anchor
- Notable credit(s): CBS New York weather and entertainment CBS Chicago weather CBS This Morning; CBS Evening News; The Talk; Good Morning America
- Television: WTAP-TV; Sinclair Broadcast Group; WPLG-TV; WCBS-TV; WBBM-TV
- Children: 3

Megan Linnea Glaros is an American meteorologist. She was formerly the weekday morning meteorologist for WBBM-TV in Chicago and the weekend meteorologist/weekday entertainment reporter for WCBS-TV in New York City.

== Early life and education ==
Glaros grew up in Dyer, Indiana, which is located about 35 miles southeast from Chicago, Illinois. She has been dancing since she was six years old, training at The Dance Gallery in Munster, Indiana, Ruth Page Center for the Arts, and Lou Conte Dance Studio, the latter two in Chicago. She also modeled professionally while in high school and college. She studied at Texas Christian University and then Indiana University, where she studied atmospheric sciences and journalism. She was an NFL cheerleader for the Indianapolis Colts for a few months in 2002 before taking her first job in television.

== Life and career ==
Glaros started her career in Parkersburg, West Virginia. She quickly moved on to Baltimore, Maryland, where she worked for Sinclair Broadcast Group, forecasting for up to five different cities a night.

Glaros moved to South Florida in September 2004 and became the Local 10 morning news meteorologist and host of SportsJam Live. She dealt with the very active hurricane seasons of the past few years, forecasting Hurricanes Katrina, Rita, Wilma and many others. She filled in on Good Morning America many times while working in Miami.

She joined WCBS-TV in May 2008 as the weekend morning meteorologist and as an entertainment reporter during the week.

Effective August 30, 2010, Glaros became the meteorologist for the CBS 2 Chicago Morning News at 4:30, 5, 6 and 11 am. She also has been called upon by the network to cover weather news and reporting for CBS This Morning and the CBS Evening News, including reporting on hurricanes Florence and Dorian. Glaros was laid off with other CBS employees due to corporate restructuring on May 27, 2020. Glaros was replaced by new CBS 2 weekday morning meteorologist Laura Bannon on April 5, 2021.

Glaros appeared on CBS Mornings as a meteorologist during the week of November 1, 2021.

== Professional qualifications ==
Glaros received her American Meteorological Society seal in 2006. She is also a member of the National Weather Association.
