= WSFL-TV =

Television station in Miami

- Miami–Fort Lauderdale, Florida; United States
- City: Miami, Florida
- Channels: Digital: 27 (UHF); Virtual: 39
- Branding: The Spot – South Florida 39

Programming
- Affiliations: 39.1: Independent; for others, see § Subchannels

Ownership
- Owner: E. W. Scripps Company; (Scripps Broadcasting Holdings LLC)
- Sister stations: WPXM-TV

History
- First air date: October 16, 1982
- Former call signs: WDZL (1982–1998); WBZL (1998–2006)
- Former channel numbers: Analog: 39 (UHF, 1982–2009); Digital: 19 (UHF, 2001–2019)
- Former affiliations: Independent (1982–1995); Fox Kids Network (secondary, 1993–1997); The WB (1995–2006); The CW (2006–2024)
- Call sign meaning: South Florida

Technical information
- Licensing authority: FCC
- Facility ID: 10203
- ERP: 1,000 kW
- HAAT: 297 m (974 ft)
- Transmitter coordinates: 25°58′8″N 80°13′19″W

Links
- Public license information: Public file; LMS
- Website: The Spot – South Florida

WSFL-TV (channel 39), branded as The Spot – South Florida 39, is an independent television station in Miami, Florida, United States. It is owned by the E. W. Scripps Company alongside Ion Television station WPXM-TV (channel 35). WSFL-TV's studios are located on Southwest 78th Avenue in Plantation; its transmitter is located in Andover.

Channel 39 began broadcasting on October 16, 1982, as WDZL. Though it was the second major independent outlet in the city after WCIX-TV, it struggled in its early years. A mishap when the antenna was installed caused the original owners to develop financial difficulties that forced a sale of controlling interest to Odyssey Partners, while a third independent, WBFS-TV (channel 33), went on the air in December 1984 and nearly immediately surpassed WDZL in the ratings. Under the ownership of Renaissance Communications, the station aired Fox Kids programming in the Miami market, became affiliated with The WB in 1995, and began airing a 10 p.m. newscast produced by NBC station WTVJ in January 1997.

The Tribune Company acquired Renaissance in a deal completed in March 1997. Tribune required a waiver to own the South Florida Sun-Sentinel newspaper and WDZL in the same market; under a temporary waiver it obtained from the Federal Communications Commission, it was required to keep their operations separate. WDZL became WBZL in April 1998 to emphasize its network affiliation. In 2002, the hold-separate condition was removed, and Tribune moved WBZL operations into the Sun-Sentinel facility in Fort Lauderdale; began featuring Sun-Sentinel content on channel 39's newscasts; and integrated their advertising sales and other operations. The WTVJ newscast was dropped in 2008 ahead of the 2009 debut of a four-hour morning show, originally known as SouthFlorida.com/Live and later The Morning Show; it lasted 16 months before being canceled due to low ratings. In 2014, Tribune split its publishing and broadcasting holdings into separate companies.

Nexstar Media Group bought Tribune Media in 2019 and sold WSFL-TV to Scripps as part of the transaction. Scripps intended to start a news department but instead contracted with WPLG for local newscasts between 2021 and 2025. The station airs a lifestyle show, Inside South Florida, and is the broadcast television home of Florida Panthers hockey.

== History ==
=== Early years ===
In early 1981, the Federal Communications Commission (FCC) designated four applications for channel 39 for comparative hearing. Four groups applied: Contemporary Television Broadcasting, Inc.; Florida Broadcasting Ministry, Inc.; Susan M. Jaramillo and Howard R. Conant, a limited partnership, doing business as 39 Broadcasting Company; and Sun Belt Broadcasting, Inc. Two applicants dropped out, and the Jaramillo–Conant group merged with Contemporary Television Broadcasting, owned by Irving Pollack and other stockholders, later in 1981 as 39 Broadcasting Ltd. WDZL began broadcasting on October 16, 1982, from studios in Hollywood, Florida—at its launch, it was the only television station with studios in Broward County. It was an independent station—Miami's second, after WCIX-TV (channel 6)—which featured classic action and adventure TV series as well as Spanish-language programs on Sunday nights.

From the start, WDZL was hamstrung. When its antenna was first installed, it fell to the ground and was damaged. The station got on the air with an emergency antenna but suffered from financial difficulties due to the three-month delay in operating at full power and needed new investors. In a deal negotiated in 1983 and completed in 1984, 39 Broadcasting Ltd. sold 79% of the station to Odyssey Partners, a New York investment firm. After the sale, Odyssey hired Big Wilson, formerly of WCIX-TV, to host a late night movie. Shortly after the purchase, the Miami market gained another independent station when Milton Grant put WBFS-TV (channel 33) on the air. Within months, WBFS surpassed WDZL in the ratings, making channel 39 the third-rated independent in the market.

In August 1985, Odyssey Partners hired Harvey Cohen, general manager of WCIX-TV, to the same role at WDZL. Two WCIX executives followed him to channel 39. The new management revamped the station's lineup by airing more movies, including uncut films. Michael Finkelstein, who ran the TV stations for Odyssey Partners, founded Renaissance Communications in 1988 with the backing of Warburg Pincus. In addition to acquiring other stations, Renaissance purchased WDZL and WTXX in Connecticut from Odyssey.

When Fox Kids began in 1990, Miami Fox affiliate WSVN (channel 7) passed on the weekend lineup, which aired on channel 39. Two years later, WDZL signed a five-year deal to air all Fox Kids programming. After Hurricane Andrew, which blew down WCIX's tower, WDZL simulcast that station's 6 and 11 p.m. newscasts; WCIX, by this point a CBS affiliate, was already rebroadcasting its late news on WDZL and producing prime time news breaks for channel 39.

Beginning in late 1993, Warner Bros. and Paramount Pictures entered into a war with each other to launch new national television networks. Renaissance initially was said to have committed WDZL-TV to The WB and was the network's first announced affiliate. However, it never signed an agreement, and in December, it announced it was going with the Paramount network. While Paramount Television Group chairman Kerry McCluggage told Broadcasting & Cable that Finkelstein had "felt he backed the wrong horse", executives familiar with the negotiations told the magazine that Paramount's partner in the network, Chris-Craft Industries, was hinting that it might buy WBFS-TV, which earlier that year had been up for sale—an outcome that Finkelstein feared would put channel 39 at a disadvantage. Renaissance had previously explored a bid for WBFS-TV that would have combined it with WDZL. The switch surprised observers because Finkelstein had previously been a public supporter of The WB.

Even though WBFS-TV entered into an affiliation agreement with The WB in April 1994, ahead of a January 1995 launch. WBFS-TV owner Combined Broadcasting reached an agreement to sell the station to Paramount Stations Group. As a consequence, WBFS-TV and WDZL swapped proposed affiliations to leave WBFS-TV with UPN and WDZL with The WB, and WDZL joined The WB at its launch on January 11, 1995.

=== Tribune ownership ===
On July 1, 1996, Chicago-based Tribune Broadcasting announced that it would acquire Renaissance Communications for $1.13 billion (equivalent to $2.08 billion in 2025 dollars). The deal came with a complication specific to WDZL. Tribune needed to pursue a newspaper–broadcast cross-ownership waiver to retain WDZL and the South Florida Sun-Sentinel newspaper, published in Fort Lauderdale. Knight-Ridder, owner of The Miami Herald, opposed the permanent waiver sought by Tribune, arguing that the waiver either not be granted or the rule be changed for all. In approving the broader purchase of Renaissance, the FCC denied a permanent waiver and instead gave Tribune 12 months to divest itself of either WDZL or the Sun-Sentinel, with the company indicating its intention to keep the newspaper. Tribune appealed this decision unsuccessfully to the United States Court of Appeals for the District of Columbia, which ruled that the FCC could require the sale even though it was considering lifting the cross-ownership restrictions. However, in light of the pending review and pressure from Republican lawmakers, Tribune received an extended waiver lasting through the commission's review. Fox Kids programming was dropped in 1997 to make way for an expansion of Kids' WB, with the block moving to WYHS (channel 69, now WAMI-DT), and the station changed its call sign to WBZL on April 27, 1998, to emphasize its network affiliation.

On January 6, 1997, NBC affiliate WTVJ (channel 6) began producing a 30-minute 10 p.m. newscast for channel 39. The WB39 News at 10 was initially anchored on weeknights by WTVJ anchors Willard Shepard and Jackie Nespral. It competed with WSVN's 10 p.m. news hour. By 1999, it drew about half the audience of WSVN. In 2001, a new, channel 39-exclusive anchor team of Julia Yarbough and Micah Ohlman replaced Nespral and Shepard. Under the waiver, Tribune was forbidden from using Sun-Sentinel resources in channel 39's operation. This changed in 2002, when the FCC permitted Tribune to combine the operations of the newspaper and the TV station so that it could offer its own TV news service. Tribune proceeded to do so, combining news, promotions, and advertising sales and placing the operation under Sun-Sentinel publisher Bob Gremillion. The Sun-Sentinel began promoting WBZL's 10 p.m. newscast, and the newspaper also began partnering with WTVJ, which had been working with The Miami Herald. Advertising sales executives from WBZL were teamed with those of the Sun-Sentinel, which had a larger, more specialized group of account executives.

On January 24, 2006, CBS Corporation (which had been formed from the split of Viacom in two) and Time Warner's Warner Bros. Entertainment division announced that they would dissolve UPN and The WB, moving some of their programming to a newly created network, The CW. Sixteen Tribune Broadcasting stations, including WBZL, were selected as affiliates. A day before The CW began on September 18, WBZL became WSFL-TV, its new call sign representing South Florida.

In 2008, Tribune shuffled WSFL-TV's local programming and moved to increase its connection to the Sun-Sentinel. In March, it announced that channel 39 and its 40 employees would relocate to the Las Olas Drive offices of the newspaper, and in April, it announced plans for a four-hour morning news program, from 5 to 9 a.m., focusing on local content and personalities and utilizing Sun-Sentinel editorial resources. The WTVJ-produced newscast was discontinued effective September 1 to focus on the new program, which launched on April 13, 2009, as SouthFlorida.com/Live, hosted by Dave Aizer, Kristin Anderson, and Amber Lyon. The program, later retitled The Morning Show, was canceled on August 4, 2010, due to low ratings. It was replaced by new primetime news breaks and a relaunched public affairs program, Inside South Florida. The next year, the station began airing Tribune's syndicated Eye Opener morning news program, adding local news inserts. In 2012, Tribune rebranded WSFL-TV to no longer share logo design elements with the Sun-Sentinel and refocus channel 39 on entertainment.

On July 10, 2013, Tribune announced plans to spin off its publishing division into a separate company. When the split was finalized in 2014, Tribune Company changed its name to Tribune Media and retained non-publishing assets, including WSFL-TV and other stations, while newspapers including the Sun Sentinel became part of the new Tribune Publishing Company. In 2015, WSFL debuted another news program from Tribune, NewsFix.

In 2017, Tribune agreed to sell itself to Sinclair Broadcast Group. In order to meet regulatory limits on national TV station reach, Sinclair agreed to divest WSFL to Fox Television Stations in what was part of a $910 million deal; Fox executives declined to make any public statement regarding the status of WSVN, which had an affiliation agreement with the network through June 30, 2019. Both transactions were nullified when Tribune Media terminated the merger and filed a breach of contract lawsuit against Sinclair; this followed FCC chairman Ajit Pai rejecting the deal and the commission voting to put it through a hearing.

=== Scripps ownership ===
Logo used from 2020 to 2024

After the Sinclair–Tribune deal fell through, Nexstar Media Group agreed to acquire Tribune Media on December 3, 2018, for $6.4 billion in cash and debt. As part of the deal, WSFL was divested to the E. W. Scripps Company in a series of transactions with multiple companies that totaled $1.32 billion. The sale was completed on September 19, 2019. Scripps added a second television station in Miami in 2020 with its acquisition of Ion Media, owner of WPXM-TV (channel 35).

Scripps initially contemplated starting a news operation for channel 39 in 2020. Instead of its own news operation, however, Scripps partnered with WPLG (channel 10) to launch a weekday morning newscast from 7–9 a.m. and a nightly 10 p.m. newscast in June 2021. This was later reduced to the 10 p.m. newscast on weeknights only. The contract for Local 10 News on WSFL was terminated on August 1, 2025.

On April 19, 2024, Nexstar announced that The CW would not renew its affiliations with Scripps-owned stations, including WSFL-TV; WBFS-TV became the network's new affiliate as of September 1.

== Sports programming ==
On July 2, 2024, Scripps Sports, the sports division of the E. W. Scripps Company, announced a deal with the Florida Panthers hockey team to broadcast its games on WSFL-TV beginning in the 2024–25 season. In the team's first season with Scripps, which also obtained the rights to broadcast the Panthers in the West Palm Beach and Fort Myers media markets, the team more than doubled its average household delivery per regular-season game.

== Technical information ==
=== Subchannels ===
WSFL-TV's transmitter is located in Andover, Florida. The station's signal is multiplexed:

Subchannels of WSFL-TV
Subchannel	Res.	Short name	Programming
39.1	1080i	WSFL-DT	Main WSFL-TV programming
39.2	480i	CourtTV	Court TV
39.3	480i	AntTV	Antenna TV
39.4	480i	IONPLUS	Ion Plus
39.5	480i	QVC	QVC

=== Analog-to-digital conversion ===
WBZL began broadcasting a digital signal on December 1, 2001. WSFL-TV ended regular programming on its analog signal, over UHF channel 39, on June 12, 2009, the official digital television transition date. The station's digital signal continued to broadcast on its pre-transition UHF channel 19.

WSFL relocated its signal from channel 19 to channel 27 on April 5, 2019, as a result of the 2016 United States wireless spectrum auction.

== See also ==
- WHDT, which shares The Spot South Florida brand and website
