= Michael Putney =

Michael Putney (born December 16, 1940, in New York City) is a senior political television reporter and columnist, based in Miami, Florida, United States. Putney is the winner of two Emmy Awards.

== Early life and education ==
Putney was born in New York City but raised in St. Louis. At the age of 14, he and his family moved to Berkeley, California. He attended Berkeley High School and upon graduating went to Deep Springs College in California. After his two years there, he obtained his BA in English Literature from the University of Missouri. He then went on the get his master's degree at the University of Missouri.

== Career ==
Putney began his career in journalism in 1966 as a radio reporter and later as a news director at KCGM in Columbia, Missouri. In 1970, he moved to Washington, DC to work for The National Observer as a general arts writer and then eventually worked his way up to becoming general assignment reporter and national feature writer.

Putney's television career in South Florida began in 1981 at WTVJ, which at the time was a CBS affiliate. At WTVJ, he worked as a reporter emphasizing on government and politics, becoming weekend co-anchor in 1986. In 1989, he joined WPLG, which at the time was an affiliate of ABC, to become senior political reporter and host of "This Week In South Florida with Michael Putney."

Putney also writes a semimonthly column on politics for The Miami Herald, and has reported for National Observer (United States) and Time.

The State Supreme Court appointed Putney to the Florida's Judicial Management Council.

Putney retired from WPLG on December 18, 2022, after hosting This Week in South Florida almost every Sunday for the prior 33 years since the show's premiere broadcast.
