= WPST-TV =

Television station in Miami (1957–1961)

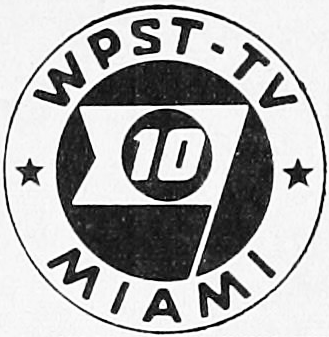
- Miami, Florida; United States
- Channels: Analog: 10 (VHF)

Programming
- Affiliations: ABC (1957–1961)

Ownership
- Owner: National Airlines; (Public Service Television, Inc.)

History
- First air date: August 2, 1957
- Last air date: November 19, 1961
- Call sign meaning: "Public Service Television"

Technical information
- ERP: 316 kW
- HAAT: 284 m (932 ft)
- Transmitter coordinates: 25°57′27″N 80°12′43″W

WPST-TV (channel 10) was a television station in Miami, Florida, United States, that operated for four years, from 1957 to 1961. Launched as the third commercially licensed very high frequency (VHF) station in Miami and the market's second American Broadcasting Company (ABC) affiliate after WITV (channel 17), it was owned by Public Service Television, Inc., the broadcasting subsidiary of Miami-based National Airlines (NAL), and managed by NAL founder/CEO George T. Baker. It was the first television station in the United States to have its broadcast license revoked by the Federal Communications Commission (FCC).

The majority of WPST-TV's existence was shrouded in controversy. NAL prevailed after a protracted bidding process against three other applicants for the station license. Storer Broadcasting, another bidder forced to withdraw early on, sold to NAL the studio facilities and tower of WGBS-TV (channel 23), which was taken dark in advance of WPST-TV's sign-on on August 2, 1957. The uncovering of a wide-ranging ethics scandal within the FCC in early 1958 revealed NAL, along with two other bidders for the license, engaged in unethical lobbying and unauthorized ex parte communications with several commissioners prior to their voting in favor of the NAL application. After FCC commissioner and Miami native Richard A. Mack—directly influenced by close friend and practicing attorney Thurman A. Whiteside to vote for NAL—resigned in the scandal's wake, the bidding process for the channel 10 license was reopened. NAL's license for WPST-TV was ultimately revoked and a replacement license granted to L. B. Wilson, Inc., which launched WLBW-TV, now known as WPLG, on November 20, 1961.

WPST-TV was one of two stations in Miami to have their licenses revoked outright due to this scandal, the other being WCKT (channel 7). Unlike WCKT, which had all assets and programming sold to the succeeding owners, the only connection between WPST-TV and WLBW-TV was the ABC affiliation.

== Applications and initial decision ==
A freeze on issuing television station licenses was imposed by the Federal Communications Commission (FCC) on September 30, 1948, in order to address interference issues and reassess future channel allocations. Because of this, WTVJ, which began telecasting on March 21, 1949, was the only television station in the Miami market. When the "freeze" was lifted on April 13, 1952, the Miami market was allotted four very high frequency (VHF) signals: channels 2, 4, 7 and 10—with WTVJ already operating on channel 4—and two ultra high frequency (UHF) signals: channels 27 and 33. The channel 2 allocation was designated as non-commercial educational.

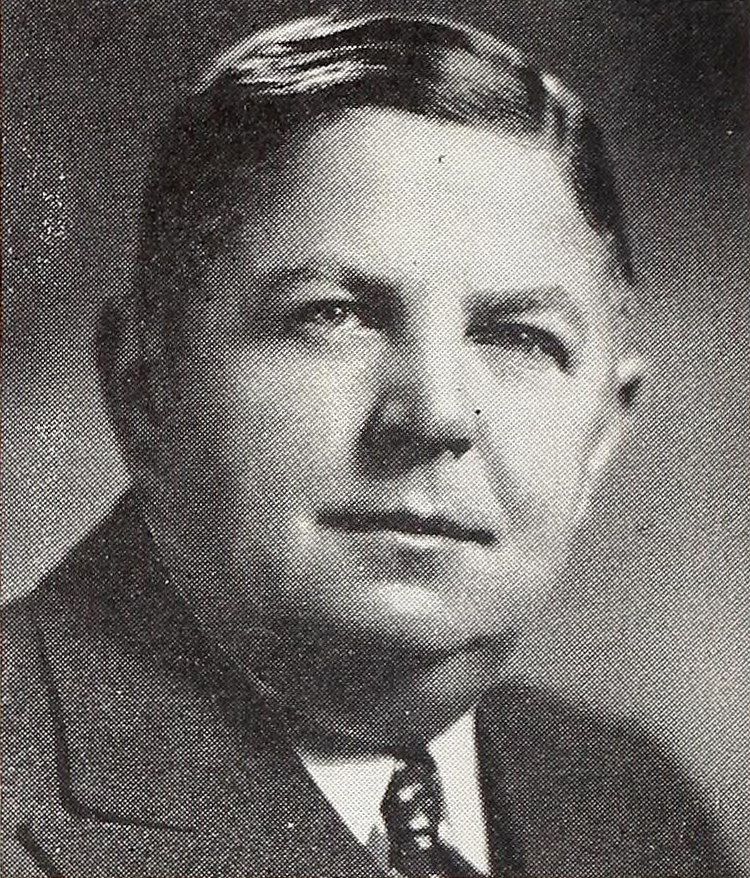
L. B. Wilson

The bidding process for the channel 10 allocation was complicated and hotly contested. Radio stations WKAT (1360 AM) and WGBS (710 AM) were the first two applicants in June 1952; WKAT was owned by former Miami Beach mayor A. Frank Katzentine, while WGBS was owned by Miami Beach–based Storer Broadcasting. The latter's bid also included construction of a new studio facility at Biscayne Boulevard and 21st Street. A third applicant emerged on January 14, 1953: David Haber, an automotive repair company owner who had recently purchased WFEC (1220 AM). L. B. Wilson, Inc., operators of Cincinnati, Ohio, station WCKY, filed an application on March 23, 1953; the company's founder and namesake, L. B. Wilson, maintained a regular residency in Miami Beach and was active in the area's social life. WGBS was the first applicant to withdraw on April 9, 1953; Storer had agreed to purchase WBRC-TV in Birmingham, Alabama, which would be its fifth TV station and place it at the limit under FCC regulations. In a change of heart, however, Storer reapplied on September 1, promising to divest one of its existing stations if granted the license. Storer's re-entry turned the application process into a five-way battle, as North Dade Video, Inc., had also submitted an application in April.

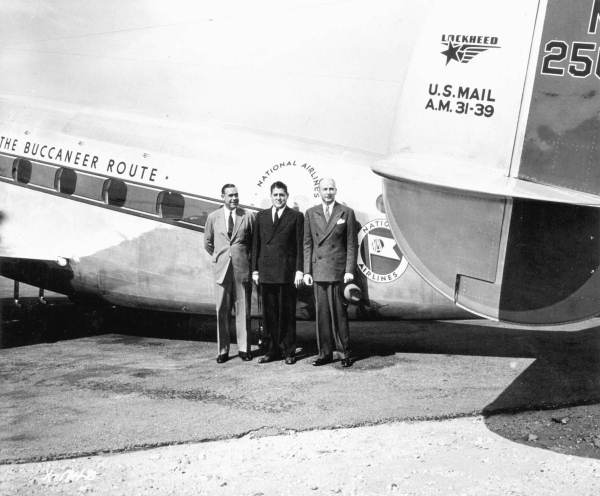
George T. Baker (center), founder and CEO of National Airlines, standing in front of a Lockheed Lodestar.

A sixth applicant entered the picture on October 28, 1953: Public Service Television, controlled by George T. Baker, founder and CEO of Miami–based National Airlines (NAL), which owned the new company's stock. By the end of November 1953, two bidders were gone: Haber voluntarily withdrew his bid, while Storer's reapplication was rejected by the FCC, prompting Storer to appeal in court over the commission's policy of station ownership limits. The FCC changed this policy the following year to include two UHF signals with five VHF signals, allowing Storer to purchase the assets of an existing Fort Lauderdale UHF station with an unbuilt construction permit for a Miami station, relaunching it as WGBS-TV. Hearings for the channel 10 allocation began on January 29, 1954, presided over by examiner Herbert Sharfman, but it was not until June that the applicants were subject to a formal review. North Dade Video attracted attention when vice president Angus Graham, who had been the chairman of the Miami-Dade school board, resigned his position after a referendum on funding for an educational TV station failed the previous November, over which he was cross-examined.

The majority of the attention focused on George T. Baker. Baker testified that he viewed the channel 10 application as a force for good to improve civic engagement, citing the Kefauver Special Committee on organized crime as evidence that "behind the glitter and glamor of South Florida lies moral decay, delinquency and graft—the three forces that are dry-rotting the fiber of the community". Baker proposed using channel 10 to televise government proceedings and legislative sessions, advocated televising courtroom proceedings, and offered to broadcast religious programming free of charge. WKAT had previously accused Public Service Television of being ineligible due to excessing alien ownership, a charge the FCC rejected; in turn, Baker levied accusations of gambling operations at WKAT, claiming to have seen the station's cross-examining attorney at The Palms, an area gambling club. Baker was a stockholder with the Hialeah Park Race Track but pledged the station would not carry any advertising from it or any other race tracks. L. B. Wilson died on November 1, 1954, but his company's bid continued. When the hearings concluded on March 30, 1955, examiner Herbert Sharfman recommended the channel 10 license be granted to the WKAT concern, favoring the group's local ties, community involvement, and broadcasting experience. A. Frank Katzentine called the ruling "a victory for the people of Greater Miami as much as it was for me and the people of WKAT".

== Storer re-enters the picture ==
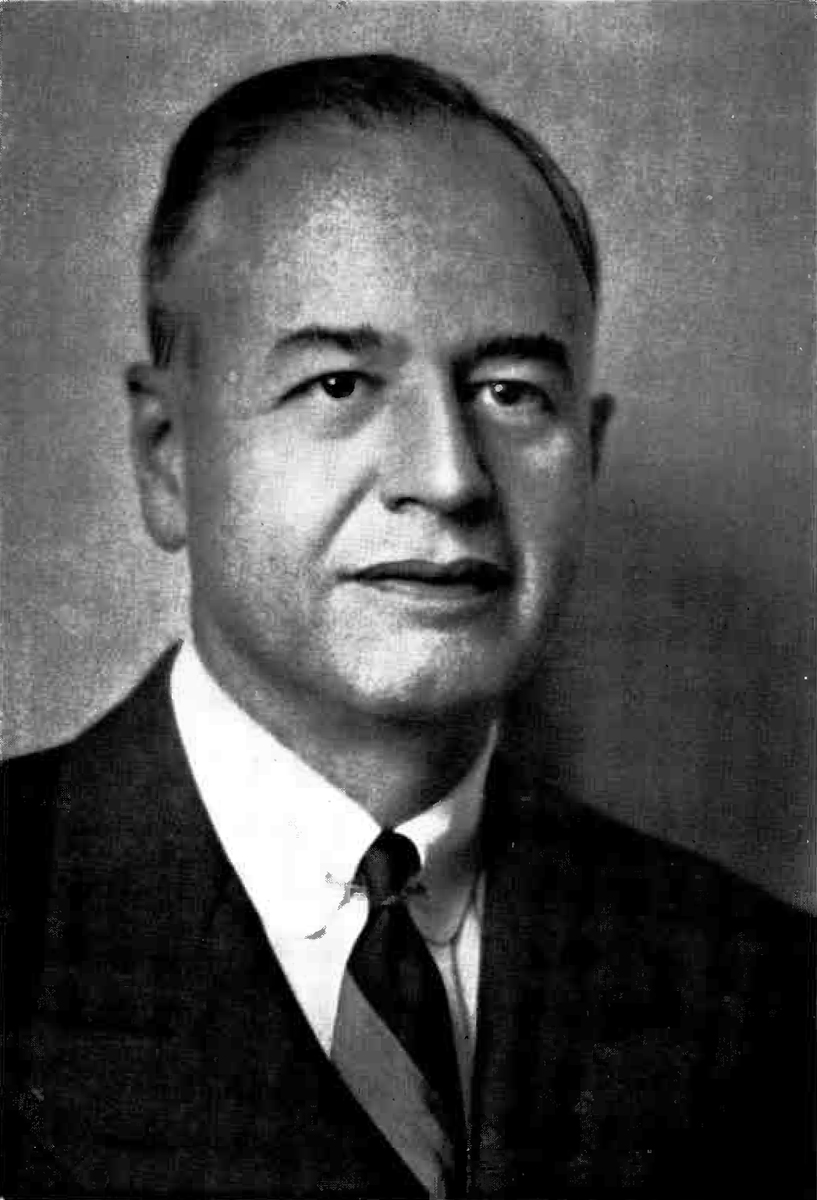
George B. Storer

Weeks after the FCC examiner's initial decision, Storer Broadcasting president George B. Storer re-emerged in the channel 10 fight. Along with Gerico Investment—owner of ABC-TV affiliate WITV (channel 17)—Storer filed a petition seeking all VHF transmissions in the market, including WTVJ, be converted to UHF. Storer also demanded that he be granted the channel 10 license and threatened to suspend WGBS-TV's operations if neither demand was satisfied. Storer had prevailed in a lower court ruling against the FCC's ownership limits, enabling him to make the ultimatum. WTVJ owner Mitchell Wolfson regarded the threat as brazen "legal shenanigans" and a move of desperation, as WGBS-TV was losing money. WGBS-TV was also in danger of losing its NBC affiliation to the Biscayne Television partnership of James M. Cox, John S. Knight, and Niles Trammell, which had recently won a recommendation to be awarded the channel 7 license; Trammell, a former NBC executive, announced the network would join their station when it launched. The FCC rejected this petition in July 1955, prompting Storer and Gerico to file for an injunction with the United States Court of Appeals in Washington forcing the commission into agreeing to a policy of all-VHF or all-UHF transmissions in a given market, referred to as "deintermixture".

The Storer-Gerico suit was one of two filed against the new stations: the losing applicants for the channel 7 license also appealed after the FCC granted it to the Biscayne Television concern. Both were turned down by the appeals court on March 9, 1956, allowing for WCKT to be built on channel 7. As expected, WCKT debuted that July as an NBC affiliate, forcing WGBS-TV to operate as an independent with a significantly downscaled lineup moving operations to an existing house on the Biscayne Boulevard site. The last of the Storer-Gerico appeals was rejected in court on January 17, 1957, affirming WCKT's license and removing the last impediment for awarding the channel 10 license; Katzentine was regarded by The Miami News as the "leading contender". The January 21, 1957, issue of Broadcasting offered another twist: the FCC was set to award the license at an upcoming February 6 meeting, but Broadcasting reported a decision already had been written favoring Public Service Television/NAL, reversing Herbert Sharfman's WKAT/Katzentine recommendation and surprising an NAL spokesman contacted by the Miami Herald. The report came as Oklahoma Sen. A. S. Mike Monroney, part of the Interstate and Foreign Commerce Committee, called on the FCC to defer making a decision on NAL until determining if an airline, eligible for possible government subsidies (NAL was not receiving any at the time), should be allowed to own a television station. The commission rejected considering the letter because it was not part of the record in the proceeding and believed that doing so would constitute "legal error".

== Construction ==
The FCC's February 1957 meeting affirmed the Broadcasting report and confirmed industry rumors, awarding a construction permit for channel 10 to Public Service Television/NAL. Four of the seven commissioners voted for NAL, two voted for other candidates, and one abstained. The commission praised NAL for directly integrating ownership with management, matching WKAT and North Dade Video, Inc., in multiple attributes ranging from programming proposals to media diversification, while L. B. Wilson, Inc.'s bid was adversely affected by Wilson's death. George T. Baker expressed gratitude at the grant, telling the Miami News, "...I can assure you that the station will be exactly what the name implies . . . public service television". The grant coincided with last-minute petitions filed by WKAT and Eastern Air Lines being denied. Based in Miami like NAL, Eastern claimed NAL's television license would force the airline to spend an additional $1 million yearly in advertising to make up for the competitive disadvantage, while WKAT cited a statement from Baker lobbying the Civil Aeronautics Board (CAB) to prevent Northeast Airlines from having a New York–Miami route certified, claiming competition to a core NAL route would "ruin" the airline.

Construction on the new station accelerated through an unexpected source. In March, Public Service Television contacted Storer and expressed interest in purchasing WGBS-TV's physical plant and assets, which the Miami Herald reported as "converting" WGBS-TV to a VHF signal. On April 5, Storer announced it had agreed to sell land, tower, and studio facilities to Public Service Television for an undisclosed price (reported to be in excess of $500,000 by Broadcasting magazine) and that WGBS-TV would leave the air on April 13, with Public Service Television assuring employment for WGBS-TV's staff; the deal would also allow channel 10 to commence operation sooner than otherwise. Among the retained staffers was former WGBS-TV station manager Walter M. Koessler, who was hired by Public Service Television for the same position. Taking the WPST-TV call sign, the new station secured an affiliation with ABC on June 16, 1957, effective August 1; incumbent affiliate WITV was given no advance notice and, like WGBS-TV before it, converted to an independent with a "curtailed" program lineup. Gerico filed a final petition requesting that WITV move to channel 6 (recently allocated to Miami by the FCC), claiming WCKT and WPST-TV "effectively deleted UHF service" in the market. This petition was denied, prompting WITV to go dark on May 11, 1958.

== Station operation ==
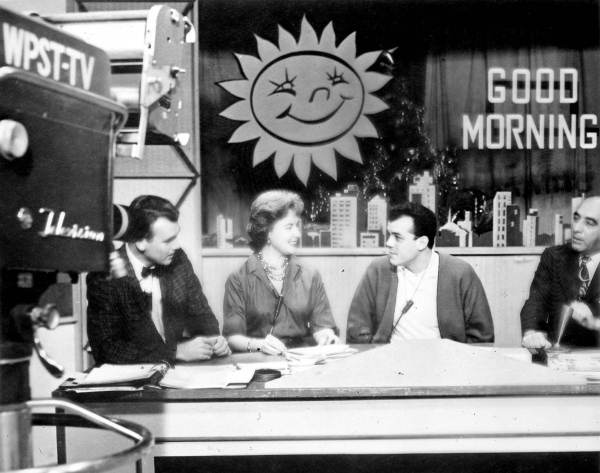
Boyd Workhoven and Molly Turner interviewing Julius La Rosa on WPST-TV's Good Morning.

We think we can run as good a TV station as we do an airline. They're both government-regulated businesses, the airline moreso than this. This should be easier in many ways.

— George T. Baker, founder/CEO of National Airlines and WPST-TV

Assuming WGBS-TV's facilities, WPST-TV was launched under severe space constraints until the permanent studios on Biscayne Boulevard could be completed; an existing warehouse on the property was torn down to make way for the new building. Construction began with groundbreaking in June 1957 and was initially estimated for a November completion. WPST-TV aimed for an August 1, 1957, sign-on, but it officially started the following day. The two-story residential building temporarily housing WPST-TV (and which previously housed WGBS-TV) was not big enough to support a proper studio, with the living room partitioned into studios "A" and "B" and the adjacent outdoor carport functioning as a weather set. During the new building's construction, a time capsule was sealed into the entrance walkway outside on December 23, 1957, with instructions not to be opened until 2057.

Two WITV personalities soon defected to WPST-TV: Bill Wyler moved his weekday afternoon teenage dance show to WPST-TV when it launched, while news commentator Bill Bayer joined the station in November. Children's host Frank Weed moved his show Tumbleweed Ranch, which previously aired over WITV and WTVJ, to WPST-TV on Saturday afternoons. Molly Turner, who already had prior on-camera experience as a freelancer for multiple Miami stations, joined WPST-TV as an in-studio commercial host and was eventually promoted to weather reporter. Turner would eventually co-host Good Morning, the station's morning show mixing cartoons, beauty advice and light interviews. In an interview with the Miami Herald, Baker reiterated his aspirations to use WPST-TV as a tool to improve coverage of community events and government functions and favored the station delivering on-air editorials, saying, "I think our station has the right to say what it thinks on community issues."

On January 17, 1958, WPST-TV inaugurated the studios it had built on the Biscayne Boulevard site. 500 civic leaders and dignitaries attended the gala event, including George B. Storer and actress Jayne Mansfield; they watched filmed messages from vice president Richard Nixon, Florida governor LeRoy Collins, FCC chairman John C. Doerfer, ABC head Leonard Goldenson, and ABC vice president of television Oliver Treyz.

== Richard Mack scandal ==
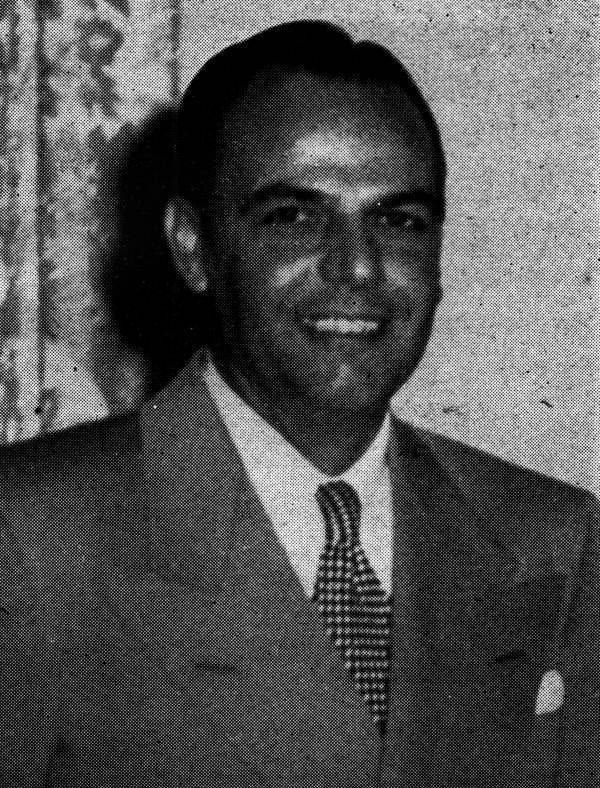
FCC commissioner Richard Mack

The same day that WPST-TV's studios were formally dedicated, Drew Pearson's syndicated newspaper column alleged widespread corruption within the FCC that influenced the granting of multiple television station licenses, singling out WPST-TV in particular. Pearson claimed FCC commissioner Richard A. Mack was paid several thousand dollars by Thurman A. Whiteside, a Miami-based lawyer retained by NAL, while the Eisenhower administration sought to overrule examiner Herbert Sharfman's recommendation of A. Frank Katzentine; additionally, Mack admitted that Whiteside was a "close friend" and his own legal representation. Baker and Whiteside refuted Pearson's claims, though the latter admitted to representing Mack legally in the past. Pearson's column, which also claimed that Mack made a promise to Whiteside that he would vote for NAL, helped spur the House Subcommittee on Legislative Oversight into furthering an investigation into the commission's practices.

While being cross-examined, FCC chairman John C. Doerfer revealed that an unidentified airline had paid for a 1956 golf trip of the CAB chairman. However, it was former subcommittee counsel Bernard Schwartz, fired by the subcommittee after alleging members were "trying to whitewash" behavior by White House officials, who ultimately doomed WPST-TV. Schwartz told reporters an unnamed commissioner had engaged in bribery regarding an unnamed license application dispute; testifying under oath, Schwartz affirmed Pearson's allegations against Mack and Whiteside, calling the latter a "fixer". Even more damning for Mack was a letter he sent to the FCC in 1951 while still a member of the Florida Railroad and Public Utilities Commission that endorsed Katzentine. The New York Herald Tribune and Miami Herald reprinted it on February 17, 1958, showing that Mack lauded Katzentine as "a pioneer resident of Miami and has been an outstanding business and civic leader for years".

While on the witness stand several days later, Whiteside testified that Mack had business connections to WPST-TV and WCKT through an insurance company, Stembler-Shelden. Whiteside admitted to contacting Mack on NAL's behalf and made several personal loans to Mack that totaled $2,650 following his FCC appointment, but he denied exerting pressure on Mack for the license and assailed Bernard Schwartz as "an unmitigated liar" and "a depraved person". Such improper ex parte communications with FCC officials on behalf of aspiring television station licensees were so common that the House subcommittee's chief counsel found evidence of them in almost every major TV station case decided by the commission.

Oregon Sen. Wayne Morse called for President Eisenhower to seek Mack's resignation as a result of Whiteside's testimony and said Doerfer "should be thoroughly investigated". On February 21, per a story by Clark Mollenhoff in The Minneapolis Tribune, Eisenhower assistant Sherman Adams notified Mack that his "usefulness in the administration" had ended due to the revelations, hastening Mack's resignation. NAL would quickly find itself directly affected by the case: the CAB reversed examiners' findings recommending National for newly established St. Louis–Florida and Chicago–Florida routes, granting them instead to Trans World Airlines and Northwest Airlines, respectively. When asked if the CAB's actions had anything to do with the channel 10 license scandal, Baker asked, "Who can tell?"

== A broadcast license on trial ==
With the channel 10 scandal in public view, the FCC selected retired Pennsylvania Supreme Court justice Horace Stern to preside over a rehearing for the WPST-TV license, the first time an examiner outside of the commission's staff had ever been appointed. Stern's presence drew a brief protest among WPST-TV's attorney, noting that Stern was associated with a law firm representing the owner of WPEN in Philadelphia, but FCC chairman John C. Doerfer swore him in on June 23, 1958. FCC general counsel Warren Baker's list of witnesses to be summoned included Mack, Whiteside, George T. Baker, A. Frank Katzentine, and former Miami mayor Perrine Palmer Jr., plus the same two executives from Florida Power & Light implicated in the Biscayne Broadcasting license case: chairman McGregor Smith and vice-president Ben Fuqua, who also doubled as a lobbyist. Representatives from Eastern Air Lines were also allowed to participate, having again asked for the FCC to pull the license. Citing a proposal by Pan Am to buy National, the airline was worried that Pan Am would use the station to promote itself "to the detriment of Eastern" and also cited rules that prohibited airlines from acquiring "public service enterprises not utilized in providing air transportation". The deal had another indirect conflict of interest: Stern was the father-in-law of a Pan Am executive, who stood to profit from the deal; Stern was advised to remain as examiner by all parties.

Among the issues Stern was tasked with resolving for the FCC: if Mack needed to recuse himself from voting; if any candidates attempted to influence the commissioners; if the license was voidable; and if any of the applicants should be disqualified. On the rehearing's first day, Katzentine admitted to visiting Mack twice with Perrine Palmer after learning of his NAL vote in advance, "to get him unpledged" and vote on the "merits"; Katzentine also spoke on the phone with Thurman Whiteside, who promised to "release" Mack from a pledge if one existed. Prior to meeting Mack and Whiteside, Katzentine consulted Sen. George Smathers, while Palmer met with Whiteside, who had agreed to lobby Mack on behalf of NAL as a promise made with Robert H. Anderson (at the time heading a law firm representing NAL and later appointed as a circuit court judge). Ben Fuqua testified to speaking with Mack upon McGregor Smith's request, while Smith was approached by Tennessee Sen. Estes Kefauver regarding Katzentine's application; Fuqua also urged Mack to vote on the merits of the applicants. Kefauver recommended Fuqua for lobbying as he knew Mack better than Smith; Fuqua likewise insisted he was a "messenger boy" and that Smith wanted to repay Kefauver for a favor. Whiteside testified that, over an eight-year period, Mack took out 17 personal loans that totaled $10,900, with all but $250 repaid at the start of 1958; Whiteside also denied having been contacted or influenced by Anderson despite being presented with a photostat of his statement to the House Subcommittee saying otherwise. Two days after Whiteside's testimony, on September 25, 1958, he and Mack were indicted on three counts of influence peddling, fraud and conspiracy to "corruptly influence" the awarding of the channel 10 license; Mack called the charges "ridiculous", while Whiteside blamed "Washington politics".

All of those [lobbying on behalf of Katzentine]... to whom Mack was obligated, by reason of friendship or political support... actually sought his vote for WKAT, however vigorously both he and they denied, they asked him for it in so many words. One would have to be quite naïve to accept... that they urged him only to decide... on the merits... Mack certainly knew what was being asked of him.

— Judge Horace Stern

A cross-examination of George T. Baker resulted in Baker assailing Sen. Smathers for lying to the House Subcommittee to "put out a big story", while Katzentine's attorney read from Smathers' statement describing Baker as "over-bearing and abusive" during a visit to his office. Baker also denied knowledge of Whiteside influencing Mack but said, "I'm grateful for what he did if he did it... but he certainly didn't do it at our direction." Meanwhile, Robert F. Jones—a former Ohio legislator and FCC commissioner—testified before the House Subcommittee that North Dade Video paid him $2,000 to lobby commissioner T.A.M. Craven, along with Reps. Emanuel Celler and John Carl Hinshaw, on why an airline subsidiary should not own a television station in a market central to the airline. Craven recused himself from voting, while Jones claimed their discussion was "academic". A brief from U.S. Attorney General William P. Rogers urged Judge Stern to void the WPST-TV license, institute a new bidding process, and disqualify NAL, Katzentine and North Dade Video from consideration based on prior attempts to influence Mack. FCC associate general counsel Edgar W. Holtz largely concurred, calling the WPST-TV decision "improperly made" and asking the judge to make an example with a ruling establishing ethical standards.

Stern's ruling, delivered on December 1, 1958, sided with Rogers and Holtz and urged a full voiding of the license, determining Mack was the only commissioner influenced by direct lobbying and viewed his personal loans with Whiteside as possible extortion. Quoting heavily from the Bible and Latin literature, Stern harshly criticized NAL, Katzentine, and North Dade Video, but declined to disqualify them; Stern also refrained from commenting on L. B. Wilson, Inc., which largely escaped scrutiny and criticism during the rehearing. The front page of the Miami Herald declared "NAL Hold On Ch. 10 Seen Lost", but while some of the station's staff expressed concerns about being taken dark, the majority largely remained confident in both Baker and WPST-TV's future. Baker declined to comment, but WPST-TV attorney Norman Jorgensen promised to contest Stern's ruling before the FCC, telling the Herald, "[T]here will be litigation. You can bet on that." Meanwhile, the Miami Church of Religious Science announced the securing of funding for a license application, having made the decision to apply based on "a sudden thought".

== The FCC's verdict ==
After a motion to move the trial from Washington to Miami was denied, and after postponement at the request of defense counsel, federal judge F. Dickinson Letts denied a final request for a delay from the defense on March 26, setting an April 7 opening date for the Mack–Whiteside trial. To avoid creating any undue publicity for the trial, the FCC agreed to suspend a future rehearing on the WPST-TV license until after the trial concluded.

The trial lasted 14 weeks; jury selection alone took three days in the highly publicized trial, as more than half of the 73 prospective jurors had already heard of the case. Katzentine complained that the defense was harassing him by ordering him to Washington "at once" to testify. Senator Kefauver also testified, revealing that, in addition to having lobbied McGregor Smith and Ben Fuqua to persuade Mack, he had also talked to several FCC members in the interest of having a ruling on the merits. Government testimony also raised the fact that Whiteside had endorsed a $1,500 loan to Mack made by the First National Bank of Coral Gables. Defense testimony wrapped up in late June, and the court record of the trial ran 6,700 pages long. Television Digest criticized the trial for its dullness and slow pace and having not revealed any new information other than what had already been established; it noted that its "cast of characters was ready for full rerun" and declared that "...the end of the marathon construction job was nowhere near in sight".

The case ended on July 10, when judge Burnita Shelton Matthews declared a mistrial because of a hung jury. One juror out of twelve refused to join the others in a guilty verdict and could not be persuaded. The news greatly enthused Mack's father, a Fort Lauderdale hotel manager, while Whiteside's attorney hailed the holdout juror, 40-year-old government engineer John A. Sakaley, as a "man of great courage and stature". The expensive case, however, had begun to take its toll on the parties. Whiteside's attorney claimed that his client had fallen in "extreme financial hardship" for paying all the expenses of all the witnesses. Katzentine died in March 1960 of a heart attack at the age of 58, being remembered as a crime-fighter. Despite this, it remained business as usual at WPST-TV itself, with programs such as Youth Asks Business and the Sunday evening public affairs show Important leading what the Fort Lauderdale News called "the area's biggest package of local shows".

Mack and Whiteside appealed the judge's denial of their motions for acquittal, but a federal appeals court rejected the bid in September 1959, allowing the Department of Justice to proceed with its plans for a new trial. Appeals with the U. S. Supreme Court were rejected twice in December 1959 and January 1960, respectively, effectively forcing a retrial. Mack's physical and mental health, however, deteriorated to the point where he was admitted to the psychiatric institute at Jackson Memorial Hospital under court order on January 28, 1960. Doctors cited his "lacking in competancy [sic] and capacity to conduct his personal or other affairs and to exercise judgement" made worse by alcoholism. Mack's father signed a petition stating that his son's mind was "wandering"; Mack had already been given psychiatric treatment twice and was hospitalized following a fall the preceding October. Mack's wife filed for divorce, claiming he refused to support her and started drinking to excess. Charges against Mack were dropped, allowing Whiteside to be retried separately; Whiteside was found not guilty by October.

On June 1, the FCC heard final oral arguments in the channel 10 case, with government lawyers arguing that the license should be revoked and that WKAT and North Dade Video, for their influence, be disqualified. The final ruling came down on July 14, when the FCC revoked the license, gave the nod to L. B. Wilson, Inc., and set September 15 as the date for Wilson to get its station on the air, though it only granted the Cincinnati company a four-month license, primarily to allow new applicants to have a chance to make a case for channel 10 and also because Wilson's was an "award by default". It also went beyond Stern's recommendation by disqualifying North Dade Video over its ex parte influence efforts, which Stern had merely termed "imprudent". Public Service Television was caught off guard; Baker refused comment, while the station manager was flying from New York to Miami when the news was released.

== Fighting the clock ==
Channel 10 supports its name, Public Service Television, with almost a full morning of household hints, gardening and the honoring and interviewing of civic groups... Channel 10 has said it doesn't care about ratings, and perhaps it doesn't. But no matter how good is the intention of the station, these unwatched morning programs are put on instead of far superior network public shows such as College News Conference and most of John Daly's news specials. It is the viewer who loses.

— Kristine Dunn, Miami News television editor

The decision spurred L. B. Wilson, Inc. executives into action, as, barring any appeals, they would need to be ready to go on air in two months. President Charles Topmiller began meeting with area civic leaders, pledged to hire as many WPST-TV employees as possible, and announced the new station would be named WLBW-TV, in tribute to Wilson. WPST-TV, however, dismissed 19 of the station's 89 employees on August 4 and abruptly dropped much of the station's local output including Good Morning, opting to sign on at 10:30 a.m. daily as opposed to 7:30 a.m.; a spokesman denied the downscaling had anything to do with the license turmoil and claimed the station suffered no loss of advertising. Miami News television editor Kristine Dunn considered WPST-TV's "feeble" ratings in the market "paradoxical and amazing" given ABC's national resurgence, noting the station could not compete with WTVJ's Ralph Renick in local news production. Dunn wrote that despite refusals by station personnel to acknowledge a delicensing threat, "...the opinion of broadcasters here was that the ax would fall. And Channel 10's actions have not indicated optimism."

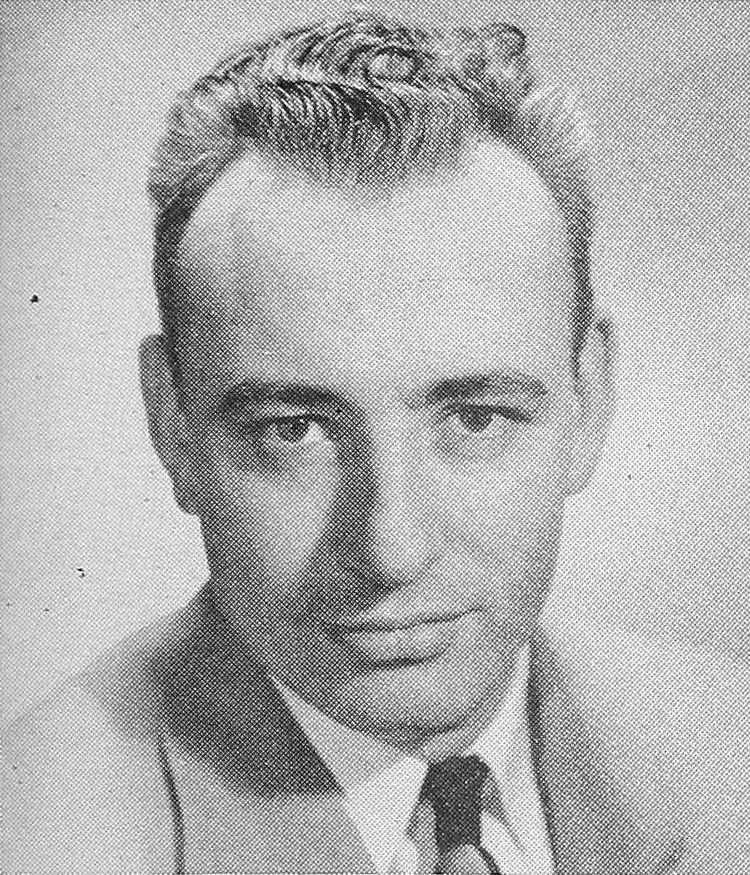
Charles Topmiller

Two weeks after the ruling, WPST-TV had yet to enter into negotiations with WLBW-TV over dispersal of assets in what the Miami News called a "shadow box" and "a cat-and-mouse game". Topmiller acknowledged he had not approached George T. Baker about purchasing any WPST-TV equipment, while industry observers felt Baker would simply refuse to sell anything and file "a powerful appeal". Baker filed such an appeal on August 12, 1960, along with a stay request for the changeover with the FCC. News sports columnist Tommy Devine addressed the possible fate of ABC's sports coverage, including the NCAA Football Game of the Week and AFL games, as the network was prevented from making a new commitment due to WPST-TV's existing contract, but an ABC executive did not anticipate "any interruption in our programs in Miami". With the September 15 launch date looming, WLBW-TV found a home by signing a lease for a building previously used by the Soundac animation studio after Baker presented a lease offer deemed "prohibitive". Opposition filed by WLBW-TV to the stay request claimed Baker valued the studio building at $6 million, five times the book value. Joe Bryant of the Fort Lauderdale News was critical of the FCC's compressed timeline forcing WLBW-TV to make significant expenditures, saying that "the whole situation could hardly have been muddled more by a group of complete amateurs than it has by the experts of the FCC".

While the FCC moved the changeover to October 1, stay requests were denied for both WPST-TV and WHDH-TV (channel 5) in Boston, whose license had also been revoked but allowed to continue under special temporary authority. With the appeal court filing still pending, the FCC postponed the changeover order on September 21, 1960, until 15 days after the court's ruling. As it was, WLBW-TV began hiring several former WPST-TV staffers, including newscaster Jack Gregson, engineer Bill Latham, announcer Bill Wyler, and production manager George Booker. By November 1960, WLBW-TV began transmitting a test pattern nightly at 2:00 a.m. when WPST-TV was not in operation but otherwise functioned as a shell, employing a minimum of staffers during the interregnum and spending $8,000 a week to run a television station which could not broadcast. During the appeals court hearing, a WPST-TV attorney claimed the delicensing was "basically illegal and has no substance in fact". Overshadowing the process, Thurman A. Whiteside committed suicide on May 13, 1961, in his law office library, despite having often talked about his legal situation in public lightheartedly.

The appeals court ruled in favor of the FCC in July 1961, with Judge E. Barrett Prettyman writing:

Surreptitious efforts to influence an official charged with the duty of deciding contested issues upon an open record in accord with the basic principles of our jurisdiction eat at the very heart of our system of government—due process, fair play, open proceedings, unbiased, uninfluenced decision... We do not have here an ordinary case of 'unclean hands', in which counterbalancing considerations of public interest in the service involved might justify awards despite misbehavior. This case concerns corrupt tampering with the adjudicatory process itself.

Baker and WPST-TV filed a writ of certiorari with the U. S. Supreme Court to review the appeals court decision; this request was denied on October 9, 1961, along with a request by WLBW-TV for monetary compensation due to the repeated delays. With Baker having exhausted all remaining legal options, the FCC imposed a changeover time of 3:00 a.m. on November 20, 1961, marking the first revocation of a broadcast license for a television station in the United States.

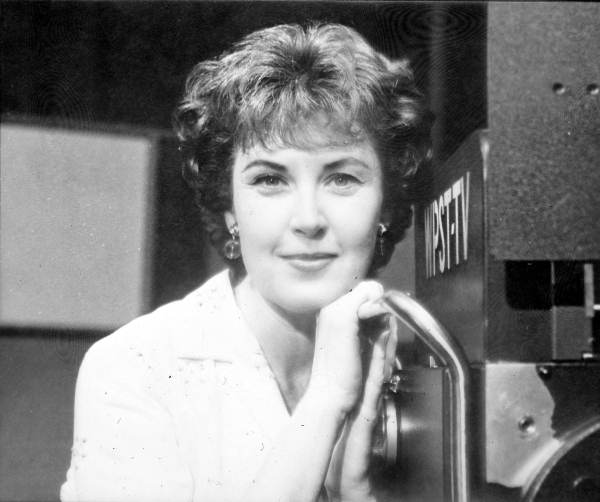
Molly Turner

Topmiller was relieved by the appeal process ending, noting that WLBW-TV had already hired up to 70 staffers and secured an affiliation with ABC. With one month remaining, WPST-TV general manager Walter Koessler pledged the station's 77 employees would remain until the changeover and noted 21 of those staffers WLBW-TV had already hired. One soon-to-be displaced staffer told The Miami News, "Running a television station doesn't exactly prepare you for running an airline." Molly Turner was hired as public service director and host of a daily local variety show patterned after Ruth Lyons' 50/50 Club in Cincinnati. Bill Bayer moved his Sunday evening panel discussion show Important to WLBW-TV, renamed Miami Press Conference. Bill Wyler, already on retainer at the new station for over a year, announced the revival of his teenage dance show on Saturday afternoons. Virginia Booker, an off-camera WPST-TV staffer, was hired as lead weather forecaster. Others from WPST-TV that made the move to WLBW-TV included their news editor, lead cameraman and two newsfilm reporters. WLBW-TV also hired talent from elsewhere, including area radio host Larry King for a late-night talk show.

== Shutdown and disposal ==
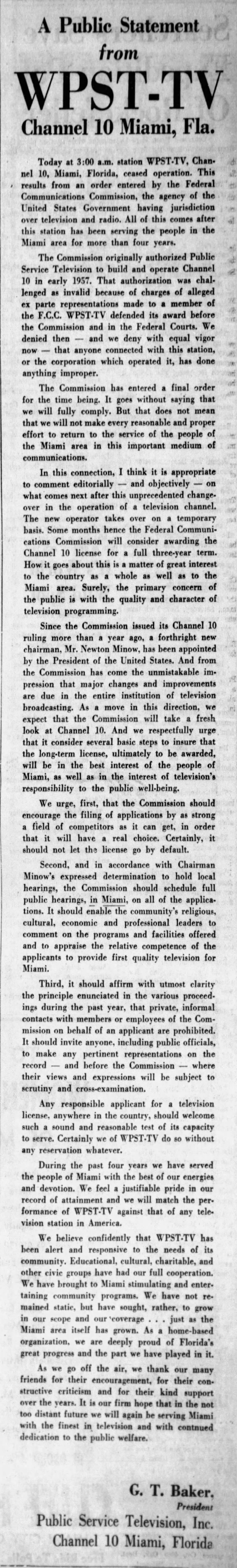
WPST-TV ad published in newspapers the day after their final sign-off.

WPST-TV's final air date of November 19, 1961, was punctuated by a "farewell editorial" delivered on-camera by George T. Baker at 7:00 p.m. and repeated at midnight prior to closedown. Baker's statement, reprinted in advertisements taken out in Miami's daily newspapers the very next day, offered one final rejection of the allegations against the firm, declaring, "We denied then—and we deny with equal vigor now—that anyone connected with this station, or the corporation which operated it, has done anything improper." It encouraged the FCC to field a strong set of competitors for permanent authority to operate on channel 10, expressed confidence in its program service to Miami, and expressed, "It is our firm hope that in the not too distant future we will again be serving Miami with the finest in television and with continued dedication to the public welfare." At 7:15 a.m., WLBW-TV began its first broadcast and themselves took out ads in the same newspapers but held a more cordial tone, saying, "We are mindful of our obligations to our audience. In our programming, we will always consider ourselves an invited guest in your home." Jack E. Anderson, the television editor of the Herald, commented that the station's legal troubles were in no way reflected in its output and credited WPST-TV with a "record of responsible telecasting".

Despite the station ceasing operations, the "WPST Television Channel 10" lighted marquee outside the former studios continued to be turned on every night, purportedly on orders from Baker; former WPST-TV manager Walter Koessler theorized that the lit marquee was symbolic of Baker's drive to re-enter television broadcasting somehow, saying, "Maybe Baker intends that the spirit of WPST shall not die from this land." While Koessler also previously stated that Baker would reapply for the channel 10 license and thus maintain ownership of WPST-TV's studio building and equipment, a November 20 report in The Miami News indicated that the cameras and other movable assets would be sold to new Indianapolis television station WIBC-TV, which would operate on channel 13. The Indianapolis channel 13 case was a mirror image of channel 10 in Miami; the FCC had ordered the channel be handed over from WLWI to a new operator, but the case was on appeal, and the outgoing channel 13 operators were not willing to aid the would-be new franchisee. As it happened, the Indianapolis case had a different ending; in June 1962, Crosley Broadcasting Corporation, owner of WLWI, offered to sell the owners of WIBC another of its television stations, WLWA in Atlanta, which was accepted.

WPST-TV's closure ultimately coincided with Baker's gradual withdrawal from the company he founded. Days before the TV station shut down, Baker resigned as president of NAL on November 4, 1961, assigning those duties to nephew Robert E. Wieland. Lewis B. Maytag then purchased majority control of NAL in April 1962 and replaced Baker as airline chairman. Days after his resignation on September 12, 1962, rumors soon emerged of Baker becoming a financial consultant for Riddle Airlines. Baker would sue Maytag in May 1963 for violating the terms of the stock sale agreement. Also by May 1963, Baker finally decided to sell the studio property after having kept the WPST-TV marquee lit nightly for 18 months after it closed. Storer repurchased the transmitter site in 1964 in order to facilitate a facility upgrade to WGBS-FM. After initially announcing plans to reactivate channel 23 from the same site, Storer sold the permit and leased the land to Coastal Broadcasting Systems, which returned channel 23 to operation after more than a decade as WAJA-TV on November 14, 1967.

== Aftermath ==
WLBW-TV was given short-term operating authority, which—by design—allowed the FCC to accept permanent applications for a channel 10 license within months. Public Service Television applied on the basis of its on-air record in May 1962. The FCC returned the application that July as "unacceptable for filing". Wilson and three other competitors applied, but after a hearing examiner favored one of Wilson's challengers, the incumbent received the commission's approval in 1964. Unlike with WPST-TV, after WCKT's license was revoked with Sunbeam Television receiving short-term operating authority, Biscayne Television sold the previous WCKT's assets to Sunbeam, which launched their iteration of WCKT on December 19, 1962, retaining all staff. The permanent license was again shrouded by accusations of favoritism at the FCC, as Drew Pearson criticized the WLBW-TV bid for Broadcasting publisher Sol Taishoff's ownership interest in the company. Taishoff maintained a close relationship with the commissioners, prompting Pearson to remark that WLBW "has now ended up partly in the hands of the man who most influences the FCC—the same Sol Taishoff". Indeed, Taishoff was listed as a beneficiary in L. B. Wilson's will. WLBW-TV was sold to Post-Newsweek Stations in 1969 and renamed WPLG the following year. Despite this severe license discontinuity and little connection between the two other than the ABC affiliation, WPLG claims the National Airlines station's history as its own.

George T. Baker died while on vacation in Vienna on November 4, 1963, at the age of 62. His death was noted by the Associated Press obituary as marking "the last of the one-man airlines". Twenty-two days later, on November 26, Richard A. Mack was found dead in a Miami apartment; released from the Jackson Memorial Hospital psychiatric institute earlier in the year, Mack failed to find another line of work and lived alone with almost no money to his name. The News noted Mack's death, attributed by homicide detectives to natural causes and likely to have taken place four or five days earlier, "completed a chain of tragedy" for the central figures in the WPST license scandal: Thurman A. Whiteside, Frank A. Katzentine, George T. Baker and Mack himself. Mack was buried at Arlington National Cemetery.

== See also ==
- WHDH-TV (channel 5)
