= Arthur Frank Katzentine =

American businessman and politician (1902–1960)

Arthur Frank (A. F.) Katzentine

Mayor of Miami Beach
- In office 1932–1934

Personal details
- Born: 1902 Talladega, Alabama, U.S.
- Died: March 27, 1960 (aged 57–58) Miami Beach, Florida, U.S.
- Resting place: Woodlawn Park, Miami
- Spouse: Ucola
- Occupation: Attorney

Military service
- Allegiance: United States Army
- Rank: Colonel

Arthur Frank (A. F.) Katzentine (1902–1960) was an attorney, judge, politician and radio station owner in Miami Beach, Florida. He was the 8th Mayor of Miami Beach, from 1932 to 1934.

== Civic life ==
Born in Talladega, Alabama, he attended Birmingham–Southern College and later Vanderbilt Law, moving to Miami in 1925 to practice law. From 1928 to 1930, he was a Miami Beach municipal judge. He resigned to run for mayor of Miami Beach; he won election, serving as mayor from 1932 to 1934. He served in the United States Air Force during World War II, reaching the rank of lieutenant colonel.

As a lawyer, judge, and later as a private citizen, he was always found to be tough on criminals. John Pennekamp of The Miami Herald credited Katzentine with breaking the hold that organized crime had in the area. He was a founding member of the Miami Crime Commission, a group dedicated to pushing back against the organized crime influences in South Florida. He had returned to presiding it by 1960.

Katzentine was on the executive committee to fight polio, known as infantile paralysis at the time. He was a member of the Miami Pioneer's Club.

== Broadcasting ==
In 1937, Katzentine applied for a license for one of Miami's first radio stations. WKAT was first licensed by the Federal Communications Commission (FCC) on December 3, 1937, to operate on 1500 kHz, transmitting from North Bay Road in Miami Beach. The call sign KAT was for Katzentine's last name.

Katzentine attempted to expand in 1952 by applying to build television channel 10. In 1955, an FCC examiner recommended granting Katzentine's application for the channel. However, in January 1957, the commission reversed the recommendation and awarded the channel to Public Service Television, a subsidiary of National Airlines. The reversal became a national controversy exposing influence issues at the FCC, in which Katzentine claimed he was robbed of the channel, and the channel was re-awarded in July 1960 to L. B. Wilson, Inc.

Katzentine's broadcast interests included a background music service and the local Muzak franchise as well as founding and financing the first TV station in Central America, in Guatemala City.

== Death ==
Katzentine died of a heart attack on March 27, 1960. At the time, he was a partner in the law firm of Katzentine and Heckerling and serving as president of the Miami Crime Commission. WKAT radio remained owned by Katzentine's widow Ucola until 1978.

== See also ==
- Miami Beach Mayors
- Miami Beach timeline
- Miami Beach government
- WPST-TV, for more information on channel 10
