= NewsFix =

American television news program

- Also known as: CW33 NewsFix (KDAF version); CW39 NewsFix (KIAH version); NewsFix SFL (WSFL-TV version)
- Genre: News program
- Created by: Lee Abrams; Gary Jaffe
- Narrated by: Greg Onofrio; Dennis Jon Bailey (weekend substitute)
- Country of origin: United States
- Original language: English
- No. of seasons: 7 (KIAH); 2 (KDAF); 1 (WSFL)

Production
- Executive producers: Gary Jaffe, Steve Simon
- Production locations: Dallas, Texas (KDAF and KIAH versions); Miami, Florida (WSFL version)
- Camera setup: Multi-camera
- Running time: 30 or 60 minutes
- Production company: Tribune Media

Original release
- Network: KDAF/Dallas; KIAH/Houston; WSFL-TV/Miami
- Release: 19 March 2011 – 14 September 2018

Related
- Nightcap (KDAF); CW 39 News (KIAH)

NewsFix is an American television news program produced for CW affiliates KDAF in Dallas-Fort Worth, KIAH in Houston, Texas and WSFL-TV in Miami that originally premiered on March 19, 2011 on KIAH.

The program – airing daily on the former two stations at 5:00 and 9:00 p.m. Central Time and on the latter two at 10:00 p.m. local time (Eastern Time in Miami, and Central in Houston) – used a long-form format similar to a newsreel, with all stories presented primarily through video footage filmed by photojournalists employed by both stations and filed from affiliate news video services; it was targeted at a younger demographic (specifically those aged 12 to 34) that may receive news through online and other digital services rather than through television. On September 6, 2018, Tribune announced that the Dallas and Houston editions of the program would be cancelled effective September 14.

== Format ==
The newscasts – which are respectively produced by KIAH and WSFL, although the editions on KIAH and KDAF are structured as two separate programs featuring stories focused on the respective Houston and Dallas-Fort Worth markets – de-emphasizes the use of news anchors to present the stories featured during the broadcast, opting to instead use footage involving the story with illustration on the story being reported through narration, intending to mirror how news video is delivered through the Internet in some respects.

Other differences in presentation include the use of a world map augmented with markers resembling mobile app icons to identify the location and to serve as a toss to each story segment (which is referenced with a brief headline-style description under the icon marker), the use of contemporary music (instead of custom or pre-packaged theme music) for the program's theme music and the substitution of teases before breaks in favor of the aforementioned visual tags to indicate segments and stories set to air.

The narrators for NewsFix are Greg Onofrio (for the weeknight editions) and Dennis Jon Bailey (for the weekend editions), who also deliver a commentary segment at the end of each broadcast. NewsFix maintains a faster-paced format than conventional television newscasts, incorporating an average of 33 segments per broadcast, about half of which focus on local stories. The program also incorporates a short weather segment (limited to current weather observations and a five-day forecast) and a sports segment (consisting mainly of scores, omitting highlights or game commentary), as well as features such as "Crime Bureau" (formatted similarly to a police blotter with photos of criminals on the run), "Day in Pictures" (featuring photographs of news stories and happenings in each city) and a historical music segment, "Day in Music".

== Background ==
=== Origins ===
At the time the concept was being developed, KIAH (channel 39) carried more traditional early evening and prime time newscasts, which regularly fell behind newscasts on most of its main English and Spanish station competitors – particularly in the 9:00 p.m. time slot against the longer-established prime time newscast on Fox owned-and-operated station KRIV (channel 26) – since the station launched its news department in January 2000 (then as WB affiliate KHWB). By September 30, 2009, KIAH had expanded its news programming to include an hour-long early evening newscast, with (later aborted) plans to launch a weekday morning newscast earlier that year.

The idea for the program was conceived by Tribune Company chief innovation officer Lee Abrams (who resigned in October following complaints surrounding an inappropriate company-wide e-mail) in collaboration with KIAH news executive producer and Imaginator Gary Jaffe, as an alternative to newscasts Abrams deemed to follow "the 1970s television playbook". The Houston outlet would serve as the pilot station for the format to be named NewsFix, described by then-KIAH general manager Roger Bare in an interview with TVSpy as "a newsreel updated for the 21st century," which would only utilize an off-camera narrator to provide continuity for story and segment packages, requiring a far smaller staff to produce the broadcasts compared to traditional local news programs. As a byproduct of not using on-air anchors and reporters, it was designed to eliminate the "happy talk" segments between news blocks to devote more time to stories, while emphasizing the use of photojournalists that write and edit each story. Tribune originally planned to launch the format on Dallas sister station KDAF, but ended up offering the idea to KIAH (then without a news director, following the departure of KyAnn Lewis for a producer role at The Daily Buzz) after being rejected by station management. Gary Jaffe was hired by KIAH to serve as the "imaginator" (or news director) of the program.

=== Launch in Houston ===
On July 22, 2010, Tribune announced plans to premiere NewsFix on KIAH that September, with plans to expand the format to some of the company's other stations "that don't have a strong legacy news product or where the local news tradition may not be as strong as it is in other markets" if NewsFix proved successful in the Houston market. Station employees were informed that the rebooted newscast would feature "fast-paced stories, added special effects and a minimum of on-camera appearance by reporters or anchors." A pilot outlining the proposed format, produced at sister station WPIX in New York City, was presented to Tribune staffers in August 2010. Due to logistical issues that needed to be assessed (including workflow reconfiguration, staff training and production upgrades), the format launch was delayed three times – first to December, then to January 2011 and finally to March 2011.

KIAH reassigned most of its on-air staff (while others left) and hired additional production personnel in advance of the program's launch. Following 15-minute previews aired at the tail-end of KIAH's traditionally formatted newscasts the day before (March 18), the station relaunched its newscasts under the NewsFix format on March 19, 2011. Houston radio personality Greg Onofrio was hired to serve as the program's continuity narrator as well as an on-air commentator. At its start, the program was criticized for featuring stories often less current in nature, occurring the previous day and those that were light or offbeat in quality, with Jaffe stating in a Houston Chronicle interview that while the program "still [has] a component of day-of news," it was trying to "bring new stories into the mix" while also not simply updating the same stories featured, "trying to push the timeline forward." Some journalism analysts and professors also expressed doubt that the anchor-less format would attract viewers, particularly due to research by the Radio Television Digital News Association suggesting the importance of anchors to both older and younger viewers.

In its first two weeks, ratings for NewsFix were lower than under KIAH's previous traditional format, with the 9:00 p.m. broadcast averaging a 0.5 rating (down from a 1.0 rating in the February 2011 sweeps period). Bare expected that viewership would decline somewhat among people seeking a conventional newscast, but expected the program to draw in new viewers (with comments from viewers estimated to be "about two-thirds" in support of the change). Monthly ratings for the late evening broadcast dropped from a 1.0 in April to 0.9 in the May sweeps period (from a high of 3.3 in December 2009 before the reformatting), before increasing to a 1.2 in August. On September 14, 2015, KIAH added a half-hour edition of its iteration of the format, CW 39 NewsFix, at 10:00 p.m. on Monday through Friday evenings. On September 6, 2018, Tribune announced that the Houston version of NewsFix would be cancelled effective September 14. Following the cancellation, local newscasts returned to KIAH with a local three-hour morning newscast titled Houston's Morning Dose that the station launched on October 22 . KIAH, which was acquired by Nexstar Media Group in September 2019, resumed a 9 p.m. newscast on May 11, 2020, with ABC 13 Eyewitness News at 9 p.m. on CW 39. The show utilized the news staff and studio of ABC-owned KTRK-TV (channel 13). On August 20, 2020, Morning Dose was rebranded to No Wait Weather + Traffic. Then on August 18, 2025, a traditional morning newscast replaced No Wait Weather + Traffic with the debut of H-Town Morning News. KIAH's morning news programs are produced with no involvement from KTRK. On August 28, 2026, KIAH ceased airing KTRK's 9 p.m. newscast (KTRK will continue to air its 9 p.m. newscast on its streaming platforms) and Tegna-owned CBS affiliate KHOU began airing a 9 p.m. edition of KHOU 11 News featuring its news team on August 29.

=== Expansion to Dallas ===
Like KIAH, the news operation at its Dallas sister station KDAF (channel 33) had struggled; although it saw initial success with the 9:00 p.m. newscast that first launched its news department in January 1999 against established competition from Fox O&O KDFW (channel 4), a switch from a traditional toward a more tabloid-style format under news director David Duitch (who left the station in July 2012 to become website editor for The Dallas Morning News) resulted in declining viewership for KDAF's newscasts beginning in 2009. Following the departures of four on-air staffers, Larissa Hall (senior producer of KDAF's morning program EyeOpener) was promoted to "director of content" to oversee the station's newscasts in August 2012, developing a format called Nightcap, incorporating multimedia journalists (which require a single person to film, edit and report news stories) and humor within most of its story content, in order to reduce costs and make the broadcast profitable. The revamped newscast continued to post low ratings from the time it debuted on November 1, 2012, even registering "hashmarks" (indicating viewership too low to register a ratings point) on some nights during the initial switch to the Nightcap format, though ratings slowly increased over time (particularly in the adult 25–54 demographic). Hall left the station one month after Nightcap launched after being reassigned to other duties within the Tribune Company.

Steve Simon left KIAH to become news director at KDAF in November 2013, replacing Hall's replacement as news director, Denise Killian; he joined Bare who began overseeing the operations of KDAF (in addition to his existing duties at KIAH) in September. Following the change, reports indicated that Simon planned to bring the NewsFix format to the Dallas-Fort Worth market. The succeeding months saw the departures of many of KDAF's anchors and reporters, including longtime reporter Barry Carpenter and anchor Amanda Fitzpatrick (both of whom were with the station prior to the adoption of the Nightcap format), in preparation for the change. The Dallas edition of NewsFix (using the same narrators as the KIAH broadcasts) premiered on KDAF on May 20, 2014, beginning with the 5:00 p.m. broadcast; that edition would expand to an hour on Monday through Friday evenings on September 7, 2015 (matching the length of the weekend editions, which remained a one-hour broadcast after the early-evening newscast was reduced on weeknights prior to the adoption of the Nightcap format). As with its Houston counterpart, the Dallas version of NewsFix was cancelled on September 6, 2018, with the final edition airing on September 14. Nexstar Media Group, in addition to KIAH, acquired KDAF in September 2019.

=== Expansion to Miami ===
On September 28, 2015, Tribune expanded the NewsFix format to Miami, when then-CW affiliate WSFL-TV (channel 39) became the third station to launch the format, with the debut of a half-hour prime time newscast, NewsFix SFL at 10:00. The move marked the first time that the station had aired a full-fledged local news program since the August 4, 2010 cancellation of The Morning Show – a four-hour morning news program that was produced at the Fort Lauderdale offices of its former newspaper sister, the Sun-Sentinel – with news programming being relegated to hourly updates that aired during the station's evening programs (and eventually, local news inserts during EyeOpener on weekday mornings) afterward; it was also the first prime time newscast to air on the station since August 31, 2008, following the termination of a news share agreement between WSFL and NBC owned-and-operated station WTVJ (channel 6), in which the latter produced a half-hour newscast for WSFL. NewsFix SFL was discontinued in September 2018. WSFL was acquired by the E. W. Scripps Company in September 2019 and remained affiliated with the CW until dropping the network to become an independent station in September 2024. Newscasts returned to WSFL in June 2021 with 7-9 a.m. and 10 p.m. editions of Local 10 News produced by BH Media-owned ABC affiliate WPLG. On May 6, 2024, WSFL replaced the WPLG-produced morning newscast with Morning Rush from Scripps News from 8 to 9:30 a.m. The 10 p.m. edition of Local 10 News was discontinued on August 1, 2025, and was moved to WPLG on August 4, which coincided with WPLG dropping ABC to become an independent station.

== See also ==
- EyeOpener – a syndicated morning news/lifestyle program produced by Tribune that debuted in May 2011.
- Independent Network News – a syndicated daily news program produced by Tribune that ran from 1980 to 1990, later known under the title USA Tonight.
