= Molly Turner =

American journalist (1923–2016)

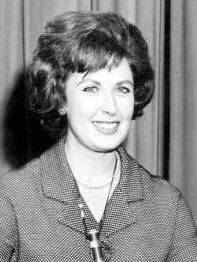
- Molly Turner in 1963
- Born: 1923
- Died: July 21, 2016 (aged 92–93); New Jersey
- Occupations: News anchor and reporter
- Years active: 1951-1988

Molly Turner (1923 – 21 July 2016) was an American television news anchor and Emmy Award-winning television reporter in Florida.

== Career ==
Turner's television career began in 1951, when her mother encouraged her to audition for a Saturday morning show on Florida's WTVJ Channel 4. Turner was given the comedic role of country music singer Cousin Effie in the station's "Uncle Martin Show". She later went on to producing, working on both commercials and a three-hour morning show. In 1960 she became the midday anchor at rival station WLBW Channel 10.

In 1969 WLBW was bought by Post-Newsweek and became WPLG. The focus of its broadcasting shifted to hard news. Turner became a television reporter, the first woman to hold such a position in South Florida. From 1974, she began to specialise in consumer reporting.

Throughout her working life, Turner contributed to community organisations and projects; in the late 1980s she served on the Women's Park Founders' Committee, which established Women's Park in Miami-Dade County.

In 1988 she retired from news reporting.

=== Recognition ===
Turner was founder and president of the Gold Coast Chapter of American Women in Radio and Television; in 1975 she was named the organisation's "Woman of the Year" and in 1986 she received its Florida Legend award. In 2001 she won the Imprint Award from the Miami International Press Club. She won three Emmy Awards for investigative reporting on water quality, health clubs, and the women's rights movement, and she also won a National Press Club merit award in 1997 for a series of articles on housing shortages, entitled Locked Out of the American Dream.

In 2003, WPLG television station invited her back to the station to celebrate her 80th birthday. In 2007, she was visited in her retirement home by U.S. Representative Ileana Ros-Lehtinen and Turner's former colleague Dwight Lauderdale for a presentation to acknowledge her services to local television news.
