= Ann Bishop (journalist) =

American journalist

- Born: December 26, 1930; Rochester, New York, United States
- Died: November 14, 1997 (aged 66); Miami, Florida, United States
- Occupation: Television news anchor

Ann Bishop (December 26, 1930 – November 14, 1997) was a broadcast journalist in Rochester, New York, Baltimore, Maryland, and South Florida.

== Career ==
Ann Bishop (born: Harriette Himes) began her career writing for the CBS affiliate in upstate New York. She went on to work as a reporter for stations in Rochester and Baltimore. She accepted a position with WPLG Channel 10 in 1970. She was the first female broadcaster in a major market (Miami) to co-anchor the early and late evening news.

From 1976 until 1982, Bishop anchored the news alongside Glenn Rinker, Chuck Dowdle, and Walter Cronise. In 1982, Glenn Rinker left WPLG, and was replaced by Mike Schneider. Schneider and Bishop anchored the news together until 1986. In 1985, WPLG-TV beat the long-running ratings winner WTVJ and held on to the lead for ten years. Bishop continued to anchor the news alongside Dwight Lauderdale until 1995. Following her retirement, she continued to work as a consultant for the Post-Newsweek television stations, including WPLG, until her death on November 14, 1997, from colon cancer.

During her career, she covered three Democratic National Conventions, Pope John Paul II’s visit to Nassau, the Eastern Airlines strike, the forty-year anniversary of D-Day and the wedding of Prince Charles and Princess Diana. She also appeared on The Oprah Winfrey Show. Additionally, she received several honors, including the David Brinkley Award for Excellence, in 1990, awarded by Barry University.
