= KIAH =

Television station in Houston

ATSC 3.0 station

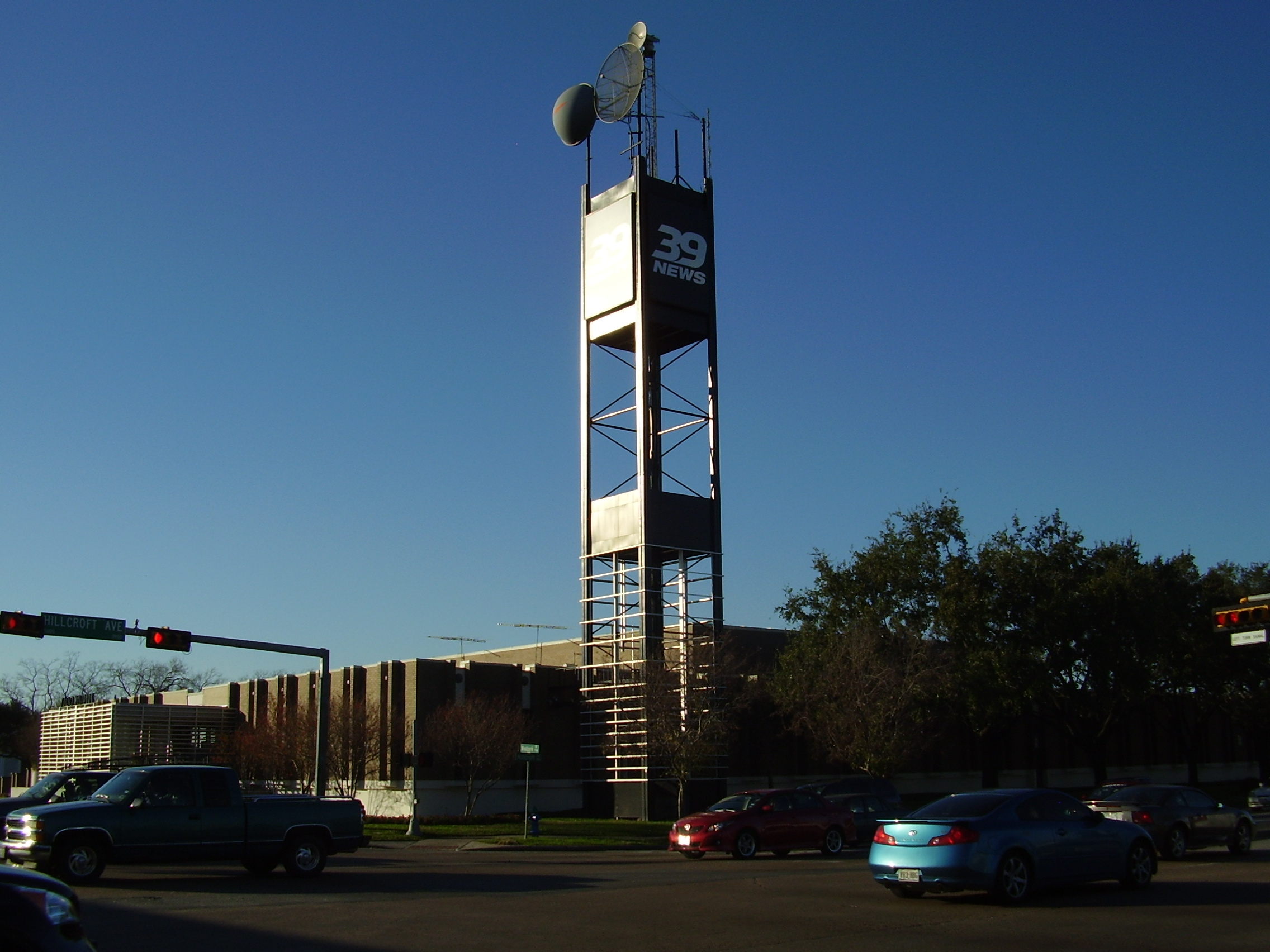
- KIAH's studios in Houston
- Houston, Texas; United States
- Channels: Digital: 34 (UHF); Virtual: 39
- Branding: CW 39 Houston

Programming
- Affiliations: 39.1: The CW; for others, see § Subchannels

Ownership
- Owner: Nexstar Media Group; (Tribune Media Company)
- Sister stations: Tegna: KHOU, KTBU

History
- First air date: January 6, 1967
- Former call signs: KHTV (1967–1999); KHWB (1999–2006); KHCW (2006–2008)
- Former channel numbers: Analog: 39 (UHF, 1967–2009); Digital: 38 (UHF, 2002–2019)
- Former affiliations: Independent (1967–1995); The WB (1995–2006)
- Call sign meaning: ICAO airport code for George Bush Intercontinental Airport

Technical information
- Licensing authority: FCC
- Facility ID: 23394
- ERP: 1,000 kW
- HAAT: 586 m (1,923 ft)
- Transmitter coordinates: 29°34′7″N 95°29′58″W

Links
- Public license information: Public file; LMS
- Website: cw39.com

KIAH (channel 39) is a television station in Houston, Texas, United States, serving as the local outlet for The CW. It is owned by Nexstar Media Group, whose Tegna subsidiary owns CBS affiliate KHOU (channel 11) and KTBU (channel 55). KIAH's studios are adjacent to the Westpark Tollway on the southwest side of Houston, and its transmitter is located near Missouri City, in unincorporated Fort Bend County.

== History ==
=== Origins ===
The station first signed on the air on January 6, 1967, as an independent station under the callsign KHTV (standing for "Houston Television"). Prior to its debut, the channel 39 allocation in Houston belonged to the now-defunct DuMont affiliate KNUZ-TV, which was on the air from October 1953 to June 1954. Channel 39 was originally owned by the WKY Television System, a subsidiary of the Oklahoma Publishing Company, publishers of Oklahoma City's major daily newspaper, The Daily Oklahoman. After the company's namesake station, WKY-TV, was sold in 1976, the WKY Television System became Gaylord Broadcasting, named for the family that owned Oklahoma Publishing.

As Houston's first general entertainment independent station, KHTV ran a schedule of programs including children's shows, syndicated programs, movies, religious programs and some sporting events. One of its best known locally produced programs was Houston Wrestling, hosted by local promoter Paul Boesch, which aired on Saturday evenings (having been taped the night before at the weekly live shows in the Sam Houston Coliseum). From 1983 to 1985, the station was branded on-air as "KHTV 39 Gold". It was the leading independent station in Houston, even as competitors entered the market (including KVRL/KDOG (channel 26, now KRIV), when it launched in 1971). During this time, KHTV was distributed to cable providers as a regional superstation of sorts, with carriage on systems as far east as Baton Rouge, Louisiana.

=== As a WB affiliate ===
On November 2, 1993, the Warner Bros. Television division of Time Warner and the Tribune Company announced the formation of The WB Television Network, one of two television networks scheduled to launch during the 1994–95 season to compete against Fox and, to a lesser extent, with ABC, NBC and CBS. Among the affiliation agreements it initially signed, which included the eight independent stations Tribune owned at the time, The WB reached an agreement with Gaylord Broadcasting in which KHTV and sister independents KTVT (now a CBS owned-and-operated station) in Dallas–Fort Worth, WVTV (now a CW affiliate) in Milwaukee and KSTW (now an independent station) in Tacoma, Washington, would become charter WB affiliates.

A wrench was thrown into that agreement in May 1994, after New World Communications signed a long-term agreement to affiliate its major network-affiliated stations with Fox, starting that September and as individual contractual agreements with the affected stations expired. Under the deal, Fox tapped longtime Dallas-Fort Worth CBS affiliate KDFW (now a Fox owned-and-operated station) – which New World had recently acquired from Argyle Television Holdings – to switch to the network once its contract with the latter network expired in July 1995. CBS eventually approached Gaylord Broadcasting to negotiate an agreement for KTVT (the only viable option for it to retain a VHF affiliate in the Dallas–Fort Worth market); on July 22, 1994, the group asked the U.S. District Court for the Northern District of Texas to confirm that its Dallas, Houston and Seattle stations were not "legally obligated to 'affiliate'" with The WB, as none of the stations had signed a formal agreement even though Warner asserted that Gaylord's stations were legally bound to draft affiliation proposals for The WB.

Not pleased with Gaylord's about-face, on August 18, WB majority owner Time Warner filed several lawsuits in attempts to block the Gaylord-CBS affiliation deal under breach of contract and bad faith negotiation complaints, and enforce an alleged contract with Gaylord to affiliate with The WB. CBS and Gaylord came to a deal on September 14, when the two parties signed a ten-year agreement with CBS to affiliate with KTVT and KSTW (which would replace KIRO-TV, which would later return to the network in June 1997 after a two-year run as a UPN affiliate, as the Seattle market's CBS outlet). Because of the dispute between Time Warner and Gaylord, for six months after the network launched on January 11, 1995, Houston was the only top-10 television market in the U.S. that did not have a WB charter affiliate. (Dating to the network's January 1995 launch, The WB had been available locally on Prime Cable, Phonoscope Communications, and other local cable and satellite providers through the superstation feed of Chicago affiliate and Tribune television flagship WGN-TV [now conventional basic cable channel NewsNation].) This status came to an end in the fall of 1995; on September 18, Gaylord announced it would sell KHTV to Tribune Broadcasting, the Chicago-based broadcasting subsidiary of the Tribune Company, for $95 million. Under the transactional terms, KHTV also signed an agreement to affiliate with The WB.

KHTV became a WB affiliate two days later on September 20 and changed its callsign to KHWB (for "Houston's WB"), at which time, it began to identify as "Houston's WB39". However, because the network offered prime time programs only on Sunday and Wednesday evenings at the time (it would gradually evolve into offering a six-night-a-week schedule by September 1999), KHTV continued to fill the 7 to 9 p.m. time slot with feature films and some first-run syndicated programs on nights when the network did not offer programming. During this period, alongside WB prime time and Kids' WB children's programming, KHTV carried recent and some older off-network sitcoms and drama series, movies on weekends as well as in prime time on weekdays, some first-run syndicated shows, and a blend of animated and live-action syndicated children's shows. The station subsequently dropped on-air references to its over-the-air channel position in September 2003, opting to identify only as "Houston's WB".

=== As a CW affiliate ===
Original CW 39 logo, used from 2006 to 2008

On January 24, 2006, UPN parent company CBS Corporation (which split from Viacom in December 2005) and WB network parent Time Warner (through its Warner Bros. Entertainment division) announced that they would dissolve the two networks to create The CW, a joint network venture that initially featured a mix of original first-run series and programs that originated on The WB and UPN. The network signed a ten-year affiliation agreement with Tribune Broadcasting for 16 of the 19 WB affiliates that the company owned at the time, including KIAH, to serve as charter outlets of the network.

Nearly one month after the CW launch announcement, on February 22, 2006, News Corporation subsidiaries Fox Television Stations and Twentieth Television announced the launch of MyNetworkTV, a network created primarily to serve as a network programming option for UPN and WB stations that were left out of The CW's affiliation deals. That service committed all nine UPN-affiliated stations that corporate sister Fox Television Stations owned at the time, including KTXH, to serve as MyNetworkTV's charter affiliates. A few months later, the Federal Communications Commission approved a callsign change from KHWB to KHCW (standing for "Houston's CW"), which became official on April 27, 2006. On September 13, 2006, KHCW changed its on-air branding from "Houston's WB" to "CW 39", restoring the channel number to its branding. KHCW remained a WB affiliate until the network ceased operations on September 17, 2006; the station affiliated with The CW upon that network's debut on September 18. (KTXH joined MyNetworkTV upon that network's launch on September 5.)

On July 15, 2008, Channel 39 changed its call letters to KIAH as part of a branding campaign emphasizing the station's local orientation (KIAH also serves as the ICAO airport code for George Bush Intercontinental Airport). Due to The CW's sagging ratings, Tribune wanted its CW-affiliated stations (including KIAH) to change their on-air imaging and de-emphasize the network's branding. The station changed to the simplified "Channel 39" branding on August 29, 2008, although "Channel 39, The CW" was used during network promotions. However, it was simplified again to just "39" in January 2011 for regular programming, and the "CW 39" branding returned for use in network promotions (though retaining the numeric "39" introduced with the 2008 rebranding); the "CW 39" branding returned full-time on March 28, using the slogan "Real Houston" to continue to emphasize KIAH's local orientation. The station became "Houston CW" branding-wise in the 2017–18 television season, before merging both its network and city into the brand as "CW 39 Houston" in September 2018, which it has remained as since.

=== Aborted sale to Sinclair; sale to Nexstar ===
Sinclair Broadcast Group entered into an agreement to acquire Tribune Media on May 8, 2017, for $3.9 billion, plus the assumption of $2.7 billion in Tribune debt. The deal received significant scrutiny over Sinclair's forthrightness in its applications to sell certain conflict properties, prompting the FCC to designate it for hearing and leading Tribune to terminate the deal and sue Sinclair for breach of contract.

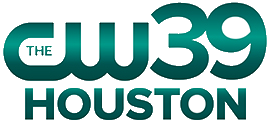
Previous primary logo from 2018 until Spring 2020; used as a secondary logo until 2024

Following the Sinclair deal's collapse, Irving-based Nexstar Media Group announced its purchase of Tribune Media on December 3, 2018, for $6.4 billion in cash and debt. The sale was completed on September 19, 2019.

Nexstar acquired Tegna, owner of KHOU (channel 11) and KTBU (channel 55), in a deal announced in August 2025 and completed on March 19, 2026. A temporary restraining order issued one week later by the U.S. District Court for the Eastern District of California, later escalated to a preliminary injunction, has prevented Nexstar from integrating the stations.

== News programming ==
When the current incarnation of channel 39 signed on as an independent station, it aired hourly news updates between programs during commercial breaks. In August 1990, the station launched its first news department and began producing half-hour newscasts at 7 and 11 p.m., a move that was made to fill a gap that KRIV had left open, following that station's 1989 decision to discontinue its 7 p.m. newscast and move it to 9 p.m. as the Fox network had expanded its prime time schedule to additional nights. The 11 p.m. newscast was intended to cater to people that missed the traditional 10 p.m. newscasts, though both proved unsuccessful and the news department was ultimately shut down in May 1992.

KHTV (later KHWB) did not carry any news programming from that point on, until Tribune Broadcasting required its then-WB affiliates that did not already produce their own newscasts to form news departments in 1999; the station launched a half-hour 9 p.m. newscast in 2000, to compete with KRIV's longer-running and hour-long late evening newscast in that timeslot. The station's then-chief meteorologist, Keith Monahan, won numerous awards for his weather reports including several Texas Lone Star Awards and multiple first-place finishes in Texas AP judging, and was honored with a Lone Star Emmy in 2006 and a Lone Star Emmy nomination in 2007 for the "Best Weathercast in Texas".

The station expanded its late evening newscast to one hour on June 30, 2008 (the program previously only expanded to a one-hour broadcast due to significant breaking news events). Plans originally called for the launch of a weekday morning newscast in 2010 (which ultimately never launched), along with plans to unveil a new set and the upgrade of its news broadcasts to high definition. On September 28, 2009, KIAH launched an hour-long early evening newscast at 5 p.m. The station then began broadcasting its newscasts in high definition on May 10, 2010, with the debut of a new set, becoming the last English-language network station in the Houston market to make the upgrade. However, like most Tribune-owned stations with in-house newscasts in HD, the locally originated live field reports are also broadcast in the format.

=== NewsFix, Eye Opener and Morning Dose ===
On March 19, 2011 (delayed from an originally slated fall 2010 launch), KIAH relaunched its newscasts and became the pilot station for a new Tribune-developed news format, NewsFix. Described by KIAH general manager Roger Bare as "a newsreel updated for the 21st century," the program de-emphasizes the traditional use of anchors and reporters, preferring instead to use footage featuring those involved in the story. Houston radio personality Greg Onofrio provides continuity as the program's narrator, and also appears on-screen to provide a commentary segment at the end of the newscast. The plan was to roll out the format to certain other Tribune-owned stations if NewsFix proved successful on KIAH; Dallas sister station KDAF would adopt the NewsFix format in 2014, and WSFL-TV in Miami followed suit in September 2015.

On May 9, 2011, KIAH became the test market for another Tribune news concept, Eye Opener. Airing weekday mornings (from 5 to 8 a.m.), the program is a local/national hybrid show billed as a "provocative and unpredictable" combination of daily news, lifestyle, entertainment and opinion segments, interspersed with half-hourly local news, weather and traffic inserts presented by a solo anchor from KIAH's Houston studios, with national content initially pre-produced at Tribune's Chicago headquarters. By the fall of 2011, production of Eye Opener's national segments relocated from Chicago to the studios of KIAH sister station and fellow CW affiliate KDAF in Dallas, which began airing Eye Opener on October 31 of that year, along with WPHL-TV in Philadelphia, WSFL-TV in Miami and KRCW-TV in Portland, Oregon (which, unlike KDAF and KIAH, do not produce their own news programming). Eye Opener ended its run on June 21, 2017, and was replaced with Morning Dose on June 29.

On September 6, 2018, Tribune announced that Morning Dose and NewsFix would be canceled effective September 14, and that KIAH would begin producing a local three-hour morning newscast titled Houston Morning Dose which was launched on October 22.

=== Return of prime time newscasts ===
A 9 p.m. newscast returned to KIAH on May 11, 2020, with the introduction of a nightly newscast entitled ABC 13 Eyewitness News at 9 p.m. on CW 39. The show utilized the news staff and studio of ABC owned-and-operated KTRK-TV (channel 13); the agreement was the second between Nexstar and an ABC O&O station, after an existing partnership between WPHL-TV and WPVI-TV in Philadelphia. The 9 p.m. edition of ABC 13 Eyewitness News at 9 p.m. on CW 39 continued on KIAH until August 28, 2026 (KTRK now airs its 9 p.m. news on its streaming platforms), and CBS affiliate KHOU, owned Nexstar's subsidiary Tegna, Inc, took over production of KIAH's 9 p.m. newscast featuring the KHOU 11 News team from their facility near Uptown Houston

=== In-house morning newscast (2020–present) ===
On August 20, 2020, KIAH rebranded its morning newscast as No Wait Weather + Traffic, ending Morning Dose. A traditional morning newscast returned on August 18, 2025, titled H-Town Morning News.

=== Notable current on-air staff ===
- Maggie Flecknoe – morning reporter

=== Notable former on-air staff ===
- Alan Ashby – sports director
- Jim McKrell – station spokesman

== Technical information ==
=== Subchannels ===
The station's ATSC 1.0 channels are carried on the multiplexed signals of other Houston TV stations:

Subchannels provided by KIAH (ATSC 1.0)
Subchannel	Res.	Short name	Programming	ATSC 1.0 host
39.1	1080i	KIAH-DT	The CW	KPRC-TV
39.2	480i	Ant TV	Antenna TV	KHOU
39.3	480i	TheNest	The Nest	KUHT
39.4	480i	HSN2	HSN2	KHOU
39.5	480i	Rewind	Rewind TV	KTMD

KIAH (as KHCW) carried The Tube Music Network on its second digital subchannel until the service was discontinued on October 1, 2007.

=== Analog-to-digital conversion ===
KIAH ended regular programming on its analog signal, over UHF channel 39, on June 12, 2009, as part of the federally mandated transition from analog to digital television. The station's digital signal remained on its pre-transition UHF channel 38, using virtual channel 39.

=== ATSC 3.0 lighthouse service ===
Subchannels of KIAH (ATSC 3.0)
Subchannel	Res.	Short name	Programming
2.1	1080p	KPRC	NBC (KPRC-TV)
8.1	1080p	KUHT	PBS (KUHT)
11.1	1080p	KHOU	CBS (KHOU)
39.1	1080p	KIAH	The CW
47.1	1080p	KTMD	Telemundo (KTMD)

Subchannel broadcast with digital rights management

== See also ==
- Channel 34 digital TV stations in the United States
- Channel 39 virtual TV stations in the United States
