= WQVN =

Coordinates: 25°50′23.3″N 80°11′22.2″W

- North Miami, Florida; United States
- Broadcast area: South Florida metropolitan area
- Frequency: 1360 kHz

Programming
- Language: Haitian Creole
- Format: Haitian

Ownership
- Owner: Nelson Voltaire; (Radio Piment Bouk)
- Sister stations: WKAT

History
- First air date: December 5, 1937 (88 years ago)
- Former call signs: WKAT (1937–2018)

Technical information
- Licensing authority: FCC
- Facility ID: 27713
- Class: B
- Power: 9,300 watts day 400 watts night
- Translator: 102.3 W272DS (Miami)

Links
- Public license information: Public file; LMS
- Webcast: Listen live
- Website: wqvn.co

WQVN (1360 kHz) is a commercial AM radio station, licensed to North Miami and serving South Florida. It is owned by Nelson Voltaire, with the license held by Radio Piment Bouk. Programming is in the French Creole language, and is targeted at listeners from Haiti.

By day, WQVN is powered at 9,300 watts non-directional. But at night, to reduce interference to other stations on 1360 AM, it reduces power to 400 watts. The transmitter is on NE 71st Street in Miami. Programming is also heard on 13-watt FM translator W272DS at 102.3 MHz.

== History ==
WKAT was first licensed by the FCC on December 3, 1937 to operate on 1500 kHz, transmitting from North Bay Road in Miami Beach. The original licensee was Miami Beach mayor A. Frank Katzentine. The station first signed on the air just 2 days later. The frequency was moved to 1330 kHz in 1940, and the current 1360 kHz on the "Radio Moving Day" on March 29, 1941.

In the 1940s, singer-songwriter Arthur Fields worked at the station while in semi-retirement when the station had a popular music format.

WKAT spent the 1960s and 1970s as a Miami Beach-based local talk station.

Prior to 2005, WKAT had been South Florida's last remaining classical music station.

The conservative talk radio format began in 2005 with a lineup that resembled other outlets owned by Salem Communications: Michael Medved, Laura Ingraham, Hugh Hewitt, Michael Savage, and William Bennett among others. And like the other stations, its tagline was "Where Your Opinion Counts."

In 2005–06, WKAT was the radio station that carried games of the Florida Pit Bulls, a defunct franchise in the American Basketball Association, later joining the Continental Basketball Association, as the Miami Majesty.

WKAT next began airing Salem Communications' "Radio Luz" Spanish-language Christian format, which also airs on sister station WWDJ 1150 in Boston.

On December 11, 2017, Salem Media Group sold WKAT to Miami-Haitian broadcaster and activist Nelson Voltaire, known under his on-air name “Piman Bouk.” The station switched to Haitian language programming under an LMA in January 2018.

Salem retained the Radio Luz format and iconic Miami “WKAT” callsign and moved them to sister station WHIM. The station on 1360 AM concurrently changed its call sign to the current WQVN.

=== Larry King ===
Larry King's early radio career was spent at WKAT, where he hosted a morning show at Pumpernik's restaurant on Miami Beach, interviewing entertainers working in Miami, including Jackie Gleason and Frank Sinatra.

=== Neil Rogers ===
For two years, WKAT 1360 AM was the South Florida home for talk radio host Neil Rogers, who debuted on the station in March 1976 in the 3 to 6 PM afternoon drive shift and left in 1978.
