= Dwight Lauderdale =

Former television news anchor

- Born: Columbus, Ohio
- Occupations: News anchor Commentator

Dwight Lauderdale (born in Columbus, Ohio) is a former TV news anchor. He was the first African American news anchor in South Florida and became one of the state's most watched and longest running anchors.

== Early life ==
Dwight Lauderdale was born and raised in a working-class suburb of Columbus, Ohio. He describes his parents as "hardworking". "My parents", he says, "were strict disciplinarians, and while I thought it was unfair back then, I'm glad they were that way because it kept me out of trouble." His father, in particular, taught him the importance of being himself. "My father", he says, "taught me to never allow anyone to define who I am, that I am the only one who can do that. He taught me to not think of myself as a victim".

== Career ==
At age 17, after winning an oratorical contest, Lauderdale received a job offer from the news director at WTVN-TV (ABC) in Columbus. He accepted the job and started work in November 1968, part-time at night, processing film. (Some sources claim it was WSYX-TV). He did not have to drop school to accept the job. He did everything from processing film, to writing news copy, to producing, and for on-air talent. He completed his education at Ohio University, majoring in Communications and graduating cum laude in 1973.

In 1974, Lauderdale moved to South Florida for a reporting opportunity at WCKT-TV (now WSVN). Two years later, WPLG offered him a three-year contract as a reporter/weekend anchor, and he accepted the job. He quickly established himself as a prolific street reporter, working half a dozen stories per day, including the Mariel Boatlift. He also managed to score the first one-on-one interview of Bill Clinton's presidency. More than anything, he remembers the rigid ground rules: " Seven minutes only, and they were standing there with a stopwatch". He was bumped up to the weeknight anchor desk in June 1985 on an interim basis, which was made permanent the following January. His first anchor partner was Ann Bishop and later shared anchoring duties with Diane Magnum, Kristi Krueger and Laurie Jennings.

== Lasik ==
In July 2004, Lauderdale had his Lasik surgery televised. Lauderdale, who was farsighted, learned that he might be a candidate for corrective eye surgery after viewing a news story about this surgery on his own station. Lauderdale sought a consultation when he realized just how critical the surgery was to his job performance. He never had a problem reading the teleprompter, which was 20 feet away from him, but did have a problem one time when he had to read from a script without his glasses. Lauderdale was treated by monovision and modified monovision (two strategies to treat each eye, one for reading and one for distance).

== Retirement ==
On February 25, 2008, Dwight Lauderdale announced that he would be retiring in May of that year. WPLG's final broadcast with Lauderdale as an anchor was on May 22, 2008.

== Awards ==
Dwight Lauderdale has been awarded the N.A.T.A.S Silver Circle Award, The Ohio State Award, and two Florida Emmy's, as well as a Sun-Sentinel reader's award in 1998 as the number one Anchor in the market. South Florida Magazine named him best news anchor in 1990. Additionally, Dwight Lauderdale has a scholarship in his name (The Dwight Lauderdale Scholarship) at Barry University which is awarded to students in broadcast communications each seminar.
