= WPXM-TV =

Television station in Miami

- Miami–Fort Lauderdale, Florida; United States
- City: Miami, Florida
- Channels: Digital: 21 (UHF); Virtual: 35

Programming
- Affiliations: 35.1: Ion Television; for others, see § Subchannels

Ownership
- Owner: Ion Media; (Ion Media License Company, LLC)
- Sister stations: WSFL-TV

History
- First air date: October 1992 (Note: The Broadcasting and Cable Yearbook says October 15, while the Television and Cable Factbook says October 25.)
- Former call signs: WMLB-TV (1992−1993); WDLP-TV (1993); WCTD (1993–1998)
- Former channel numbers: Analog: 35 (UHF, 1993–2009); Digital: 26 (UHF, 2004–2010), 35 (UHF, 2010–2018)
- Former affiliations: Independent (1993–1998); inTV (1998)
- Call sign meaning: Pax Miami

Technical information
- Licensing authority: FCC
- Facility ID: 48608
- ERP: 225 kW
- HAAT: 279 m (915 ft)
- Transmitter coordinates: 25°57′31″N 80°12′43″W

Links
- Public license information: Public file; LMS
- Website: iontelevision.com

WPXM-TV (channel 35) is a television station in Miami, Florida, United States, serving as the market's Ion Television outlet. It is owned by the Ion Media subsidiary of the E. W. Scripps Company alongside independent station WSFL-TV (channel 39). WPXM-TV's offices are located on Northwest 14th Street in Sunrise, and its transmitter is located in Andover, Florida.

== History ==
The station first signed on the air in October 1992 as WMLB-TV. Originally operating as an independent station, the station changed its call letters to WDLP-TV in January 1993, before changing it again to WCTD in December of that year. Channel 35 was acquired by Paxson Communications in 1997. Shortly after the sale was finalized, the station became an affiliate of the Infomall TV Network (inTV), which carried an infomercial format. On August 31, 1998, the station's call letters were changed to WPXM-TV; that same date, the station became a charter owned-and-operated station of Pax TV (now Ion).

From 2002 through the 2005 season, WPXM was the flagship broadcast station of the Florida Marlins (now the Miami Marlins), whose games also aired on then-sister station WPXP-TV in West Palm Beach.

== Newscasts ==
From 2001 until 2005, when NBC entered a shared services agreement with Pax TV, WPXM aired rebroadcasts of NBC owned-and-operated station WTVJ (channel 6)'s newscasts.

== Technical information ==
=== Subchannels ===
The station's signal is multiplexed:

Subchannels of WPXM-TV
Subchannel	Res.	Short name	Programming
35.1	720p	ION	Ion Television
35.2	720p	Bounce	Bounce TV
35.3	480i	Grit	Grit
35.4	480i	Laff	Laff
35.5	480i	BUSTED	Busted
35.6	480i	HSN	HSN
35.7	480i	GameSho	Game Show Central
35.8	480i	Mystery	Ion Mystery

=== Analog-to-digital conversion ===
WPXM-TV shut down its analog signal, on UHF channel 35, on February 17, 2009, the original target date on which full-power television stations in the United States to transition from analog to digital broadcasts under federal mandate (which was later pushed back to June 12, 2009). On February 18, the station's digital signal relocated from its pre-transition UHF channel 26 to channel 35. WPXM was the only Miami-licensed station that applied to cease analog transmissions on the original transition date, despite the DTV Delay Act having extended the deadline to June 12.
