= WPLG =

Television station in Miami

- Miami–Fort Lauderdale, Florida; United States
- City: Miami, Florida
- Channels: Digital: 10 (VHF); Virtual: 10
- Branding: Local 10

Programming
- Affiliations: 10.1: Independent; for others, see § Subchannels

Ownership
- Owner: Berkshire Hathaway; (WPLG, Inc.)

History
- First air date: November 20, 1961 (Note: Several station histories trace its establishment to August 2, 1957, when predecessor WPST-TV began broadcasting. However, WPST-TV had no continuity of ownership or facilities with WLBW-TV.)
- Former call signs: WLBW-TV (1961–1970)
- Former channel numbers: Analog: 10 (VHF, 1961–2009); Digital: 9 (VHF, 1999–2009)
- Former affiliations: ABC (1961–2025)
- Call sign meaning: in memory of former Washington Post publisher Phillip Leslie Graham

Technical information
- Licensing authority: FCC
- Facility ID: 53113
- ERP: 156 kW
- HAAT: 309 m (1,014 ft)
- Transmitter coordinates: 25°58′1″N 80°12′42″W

Links
- Public license information: Public file; LMS
- Website: www.local10.com

WPLG (channel 10) is an independent television station in Miami, Florida, United States. It is the sole television property owned by holding company Berkshire Hathaway. WPLG's studios are located on West Hallandale Beach Boulevard in Pembroke Park, and its transmitter is located in Miami Gardens, Florida.

WPLG signed on the air as WLBW-TV on November 20, 1961, as the replacement for WPST-TV, which was forced to shut down by the Federal Communications Commission (FCC) following the revelation of bribery undertaken with one of the commissioners to secure that station's license. L. B. Wilson, Inc., was found to be the only bidder for the original channel 10 license not to have engaged in coercive action, and was thus awarded a temporary permit to begin telecasting. While WPST-TV's license was revoked in July 1960, WLBW-TV had to wait for nearly a year to finally sign on using entirely different facilities, but hired multiple former WPST-TV staffers and acquired the ABC affiliation WPST-TV held.

Sold to Post-Newsweek Stations in 1969, WLBW-TV was renamed WPLG the following year in honor of Philip Leslie Graham. Led by on-air talent including Ann Bishop, Dwight Lauderdale, Bryan Norcross, Michael Putney and Calvin Hughes, WPLG's news department emerged in the 1970s as a leader in local television ratings and has maintained that position ever since. WPLG has been owned by Berkshire Hathaway since 2014, when Post-Newsweek (renamed Graham Media Group) divested it, but continues to maintain infrastructure and logistical ties to its previous ownership. After refusing to accept ABC's demands for increased reverse compensation, it disaffiliated from the network in August 2025; ABC moved to a subchannel of WSVN.

== Prior history of channel 10 ==
The first station to broadcast on channel 10 in the Miami market was WPST-TV, owned by Public Service Television, the broadcasting subsidiary of National Airlines (NAL). WPST-TV was the second ABC affiliate in the Miami market, having assumed it from ultra high frequency (UHF) station WITV. WPST-TV first signed on the air on August 2, 1957, from a transmitter tower and facilities purchased from Storer Broadcasting when their UHF outlet, WGBS-TV, was taken off the air. A gala grand opening celebration for a purpose-built studio facility on Biscayne Boulevard took place on January 17, 1958. The same day, Drew Pearson's syndicated newspaper column alleged unethical behavior among FCC commissioner Richard A. Mack and Miami attorney Thurman A. Whiteside, working on behalf of National Airlines, who bribed the commissioner to help obtain the broadcast license.

Investigations by the House Subcommittee on Legislative Oversight and a rehearing on the WPST-TV license award by retired judge Horace Stern revealed a pattern of influencing behavior among three of the four bidders for the license, as well as lobbyists and legislators aligned with the bidders after learning of Mack's vote. Mack resigned his position and was later arrested with Whiteside on three counts of influence peddling, fraud and conspiracy. Stern, who was acting as an independent examiner on the FCC's behalf, recommended on December 1, 1958, that WPST-TV's license be revoked. The FCC agreed on July 14, 1960, revoking the license and awarding a temporary four-month operating permit to Cincinnati-area broadcaster L. B. Wilson, Inc., the only bidder for the license not to be implicated in the scandal, effective immediately on WPST-TV's closure.

L. B. Wilson, Inc. had been one of the four applicants for the channel in 1953. Owner of radio station WCKY in Cincinnati, its namesake was L. B. Wilson of that city, who wintered in Miami Beach. He died of a heart attack on October 28, 1954, in a Cincinnati hotel suite; this was credited with weakening the credibility of his business's application. Wilson's will split his stake in the business. One half went to his widow, Constance, and was voted on by three executives: Charles H. Topmiller, who had worked for Wilson for 24 years; Jeannette Heinze, Wilson's secretary of 23 years; and Thomas A. Welstead, manager of WCKY's office in New York City. The other went to Wilson's brother, Hansford; the three executives and another employee; and three friends, one of whom was Sol Taishoff, the publisher of Broadcasting magazine.

== History ==
=== The new channel 10 ===
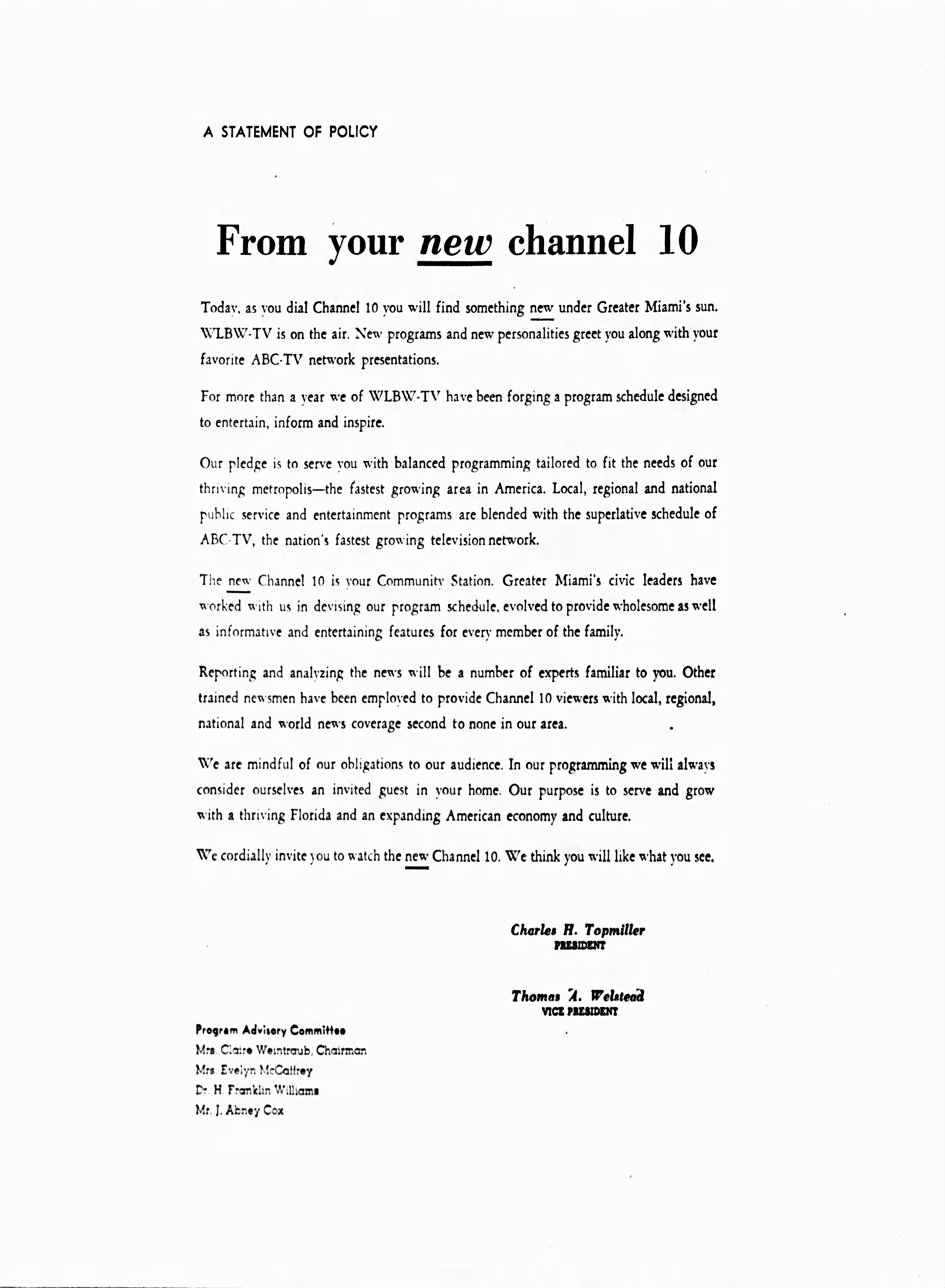
This "statement of policy" ad was published in newspapers on WLBW-TV's first day of operations.

As the temporary license granted to L. B. Wilson, Inc. was basically a "license by default", replacement station WLBW-TV was quickly assembled by company president Charles Topmiller, who assumed the role upon his death in 1954 (and which the call sign was selected in tribute). Separate studio facilities and transmitter towers needed to be secured due to NAL founder/CEO George T. Baker refusing to sell any of WPST-TV's assets, valuing the studio building at more than five times the market value. WPST-TV was originally given a date of September 15, 1960, to vacate the airwaves and allow for WLBW-TV to broadcast, but a series of appeals filed by Baker delayed the process substantially, with the FCC temporarily suspending the order. WLBW-TV was given authority to transmit a test pattern during the overnight hours, doing so starting in November 1960, operating on a standby basis employing a minimum of staffers.

After Baker exhausted his appeals with the U.S. Supreme Court denying a writ of certiorari to Judge E. Barrett Prettyman's ruling affirming the FCC's revoking order on October 9, 1961, the commission imposed a new deadline of 3 a.m. on November 20, 1961. WPST-TV's last day of operations on November 19 featured an on-air editorial delivered by Baker decrying the FCC's verdict and rejecting the allegations levied against the station. Baker's editorial was reprinted in newspapers the next day alongside a "statement of policy" advertisement taken out by WLBW-TV. The marquee outside the former WPST-TV studios continued to be turned on every night for nearly 18 months after closure as a sign of defiance by Baker, only turning it off after agreeing to sell the building. The former WPST-TV transmitter site was repurchased by Storer, and later reused for WAJA-TV. Despite this severe license discontinuity and little connection between the two other than the ABC affiliation, what is now WPLG claims the National Airlines station's history as its own.

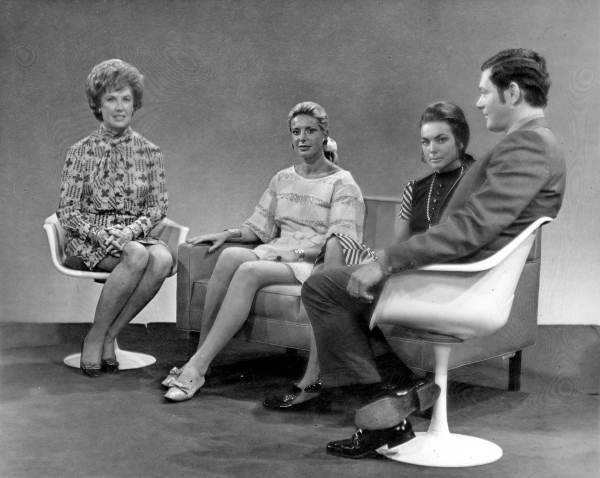
WLBW-TV For Women Today hosts Molly Turner and Gerry Burke with Luciana Pignatelli.

The first program to be seen on the new WLBW-TV was a short dedication led by Topmiller and short talks by a priest, a rabbi, and a minister. The studio facilities proved cramped from the start: in reviewing the first day of operations, which included a debate among Miami mayoral candidates, news and children's programs, The Miami News television critic Kristine Dunn noted that WLBW-TV already needed "more studio space, more storage space and more office space". Some of the people who were shown on WPST-TV moved to the new station, including Bill Bayer (whose public affairs program Important became Miami Press Conference after the change). Molly Turner, who had previously hosted a mid-morning interview show on WPST-TV, was hired by WLBW-TV to host a daily variety show modeled after The 50/50 Club with Ruth Lyons, a popular program in Cincinnati. It was also the first station in Miami to feature a weather girl, Virginia Booker.

However, with an initial operating authority to run for four months, L. B. Wilson, Inc., had to face competitors nearly immediately. In February 1962, the FCC opened the door to competing applications against Wilson's bid for a full-term license for WLBW-TV. In addition to Wilson, former WPST-TV owner Public Service Television applied (only to have its bid deemed unacceptable for filing), as did a group of former WPST-TV employees organized as the South Florida Television Corporation; Civic Television, headed by Charles Crandon; and the Miami Television Company, whose stakeholders included a string of local civic leaders. FCC hearing examiner H. Gifford Irion objected to South Florida Television in his initial decision, issued at the end of 1963, because of its experience and civic participation; but in July 1964, the full FCC opted to disagree on the examiner's choice and awarded a full-term license to Wilson on a 4–1 vote.

With its long-term prospects more secure, WLBW-TV began to plan for the future. In 1964, it began airing local color programming from film and tape. In 1965, the station acquired a parcel of land at Biscayne Boulevard and NE 39th Street to construct a purpose-built, color-equipped facility with two studios. Construction began that fall, and the studio formally opened in March 1967, allowing the station to broadcast local programs, including the dance show Saturday Hop, in color. The station became known as "Colorvision 10".

=== Post-Newsweek ownership ===
In March 1969, L. B. Wilson, Inc., announced the $20 million sale of WLBW-TV and WCKY radio (which it had owned for 40 years) to the Washington Post Company's Post-Newsweek Stations division for $20 million. It was the first broadcasting purchase for the Post since acquiring WJXT in Jacksonville in 1953. The FCC approved in September 1969, and one of the Wilson ownership's last acts was to deliver $250,000 in bonus checks to WLBW and WCKY employees with a year or more of tenure. News of Post-Newsweek's first changes came at the end of the year. On March 16, 1970, the station's call letters were changed to the current WPLG, the calls were chosen in honor of Philip L. Graham, husband of Washington Post publisher Katharine Graham, who died by suicide in 1963. Similarly to L. B. Wilson, Graham also had local connections to the area: the oldest son of Ernest R. Graham, he had been a longtime resident of Miami and was the brother to former Florida senator Bob Graham.

WPLG adopted its current "10" logo, which features four stripes of differing colors within the "0" that represent a sunset, in 1982.

WPLG logo, used from 1999 to 2004.

On January 1, 1989, the Miami–Fort Lauderdale market underwent a three-way network affiliation swap that saw CBS affiliate WTVJ (channel 4) becoming an NBC owned-and-operated station; independent station and charter Fox affiliate, WCIX (channel 6) becoming a CBS owned-and-operated station; and NBC affiliate WSVN (channel 7) becoming a Fox affiliate (although they initially promoted themselves as an independent). WTVJ and WCIX later swapped channel positions on September 10, 1995, as compensation for an affiliation deal involving Group W, with WCIX moving to channel 4 as WFOR-TV and WTVJ moving to channel 6. Neither transaction affected WPLG, which retained its ABC affiliation as well as its channel 10 allocation. As a result, it was the only television station in the Miami–Fort Lauderdale market that retained the same network affiliation throughout its history until August 2025. Possibly because of this consistency, WPLG remains one of the highest-rated stations in South Florida. In 2004, WPLG began branding itself as "Local 10" under the branding standardization adopted by Post-Newsweek for its stations.

From April 2007 to May 2009, WPLG was South Florida's most-watched English-language television station according to Nielsen; this can partially be attributed to its availability on Comcast's West Palm Beach system, which in turn had a potentially negative effect on the ratings for that market's ABC affiliate, WPBF. However, Comcast removed WPLG from its West Palm Beach area systems on April 13, 2011. After the May 2009 ratings period, the station switched to a single anchor format for its evening newscasts; WPLG's total-day viewership fell behind CBS-owned WFOR, which took the first place position among the market's English-language stations. However, WPLG remained tied with WSVN for second/third.

On July 18, 2008, Post-Newsweek Stations announced that it would purchase WTVJ for $205 million. The purchase would have created a duopoly between WTVJ and WPLG, duopolies involving two "Big Three" stations ordinarily would be prohibited under the FCC's media ownership rules, which do not allow duopolies involving two of a market's four highest-rated stations in terms of audience share; however during the May 2008 Nielsen ratings period, WPLG ranked in first place and WTVJ ranked sixth in total-day viewership, allowing the possibility of a purchase. Under the proposal, WTVJ would have merged its operations with WPLG at the studio facility (which was under construction at the time) on Hallandale Beach Boulevard in Pembroke Park. However, the sale was cancelled on December 23, 2008, with NBC Universal and The Washington Post Company citing poor economic conditions and the lack of approval by the FCC.

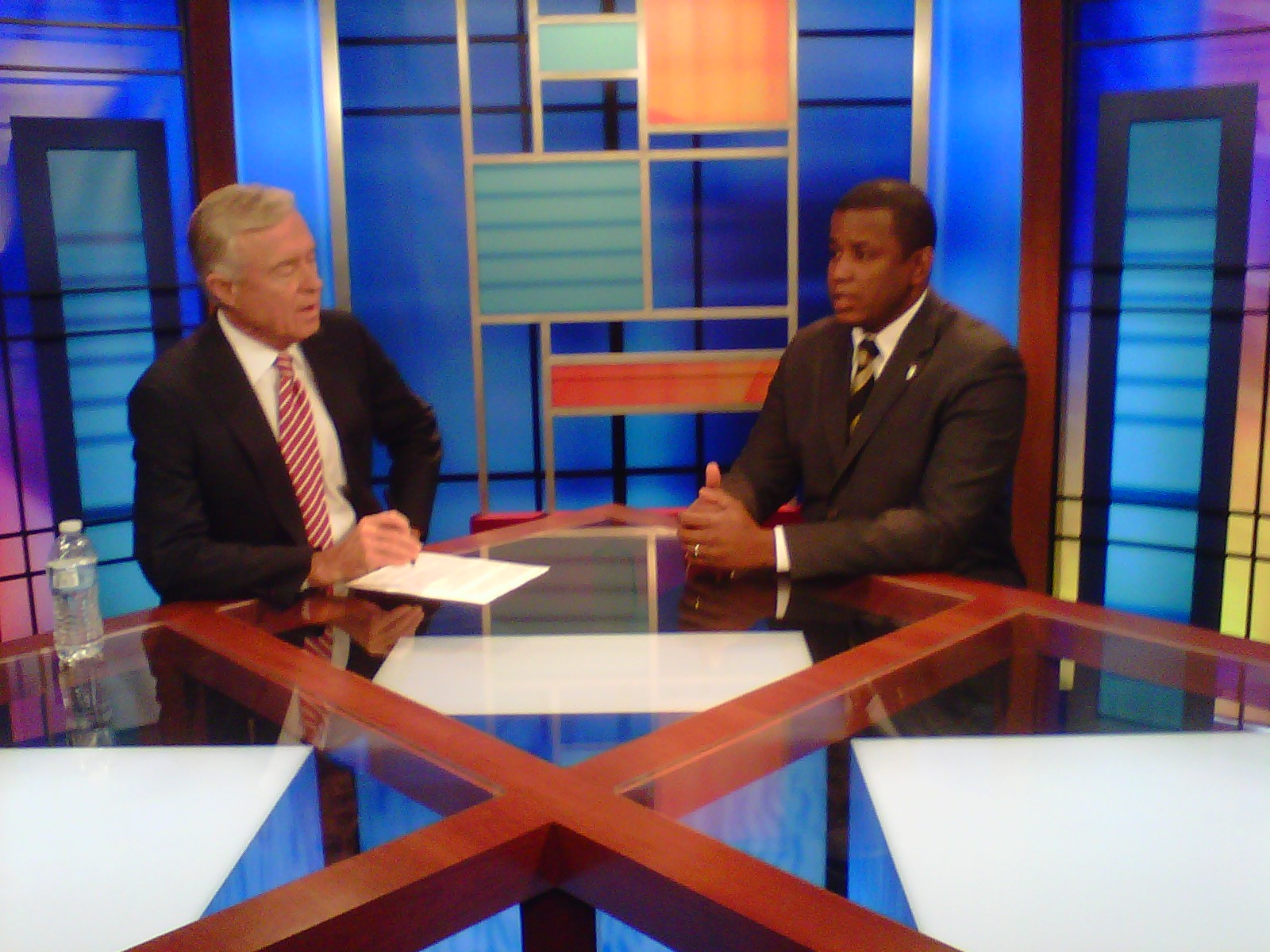
2010 U.S. Senate candidate Kendrick Meek (right) being interviewed at the news studio

On March 28, 2009, WPLG relocated its studio facilities from 3900 Biscayne Boulevard to the new Pembroke Park facility. As a result of this relocation, all of the South Florida market's "Big Three" network stations were now based outside of the Miami city limits.

=== Sale to Berkshire Hathaway ===
In 2013, the Washington Post Company sold the Washington Post to Amazon founder and chairman Jeff Bezos; the company retained most of the other non-newspaper assets, including the Post-Newsweek broadcast outlets, and renamed itself Graham Holdings.

On March 12, 2014, Graham Holdings announced that it would sell WPLG to the BH Media subsidiary of Berkshire Hathaway in a cash and stock deal. Berkshire Hathaway and its chairman, Warren Buffett, had been longtime stockholders in Graham Holdings; the sale of WPLG included a large majority of Berkshire Hathaway's shares in Graham Holdings. To maintain continuity following the consummation of the purchase, BH Media entered into agreements with Post-Newsweek Stations (renamed Graham Media Group in July 2014) to continue providing the station with access to its centralized digital media, design, and traffic services after the sale's completion. The sale was finalized on June 30.

=== ABC disaffiliation and switch to independent ===
WPLG's affiliation agreement expired at the end of 2024, but the station continued to carry ABC programming pending negotiations with ABC's parent, The Walt Disney Company. The station later announced its disaffiliation from ABC on March 20, 2025, and would become an independent effective August 4, ending a nearly 64-year relationship with the network. WPLG president E. R. Bert Medina said in a statement the station could not afford the increased reverse compensation fees demanded by Disney without laying off employees and compromising the quality of its news department. Medina also argued that WPLG's ABC affiliation was being devalued by simulcasts of live events on "other platforms".

ABC affiliated with WSVN, which established "ABC Miami" on its second digital subchannel. WPLG became a news-intensive independent with 93 hours of local newscasts per week. To provide the transmission bandwidth necessary in order for ABC Miami to start, the ATSC 3.0 arrangement between WPLG and WSVN was terminated on July 28.

== Programming ==
=== Dr. Phil on WPLG ===
In 2004, WPLG announced it had won a bidding war to air Dr. Phil and Judge Judy starting in 2006. However, the station had a contractual stipulation not to air Dr. Phil in direct competition with The Oprah Winfrey Show, also produced by Harpo Productions. WPLG's only option was to cancel its 5 p.m. newscast, forgoing its time slot to Dr. Phil, preceded by Judge Judy at 4 p.m. This became the station's final decision.

Initially having moderate ratings, the change ended up being successful as WPLG ranked number 1 in the 5 p.m. time slot, beating out its competitors' 5 p.m. newscasts, and was able to tone viewers into its 6 p.m. newscast. This change was so successful that other local stations in the Miami and West Palm Beach markets started airing syndicated programming in place of local newscasts, such as WPTV, WTVJ, and WPBF. But by 2011, Dr. Phil's ratings had declined and WPLG announced that the show would move back to WFOR, replacing Oprah which had ended its 25-year run shortly beforehand.

=== News operation ===
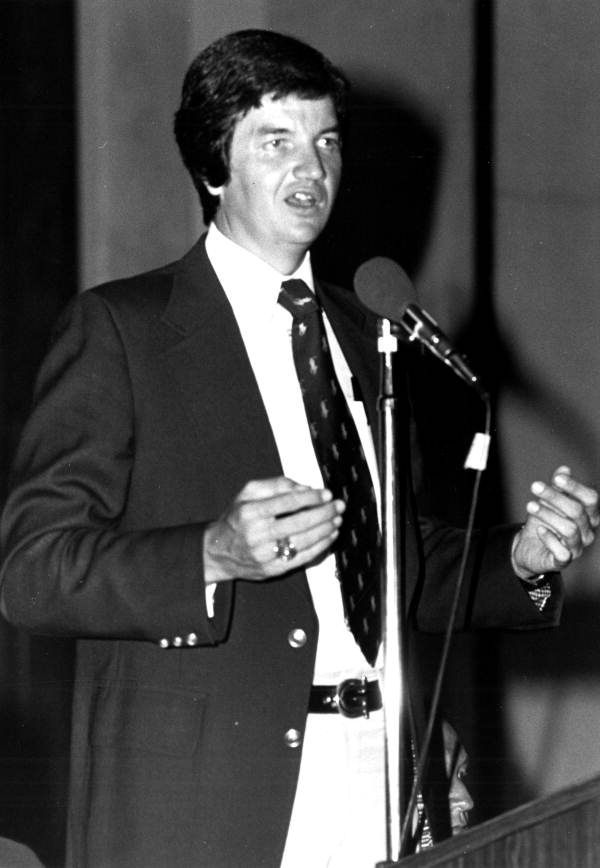
Chuck Dowdle

In addition to local newscasts, WPLG produces the hour-long political discussion program This Week in South Florida, which debuted in 1990 and airs Sundays at 11:30 a.m. From the show's inception until his retirement on December 18, 2022, the program was hosted by senior political reporter Michael Putney. Glenna Milberg, who has co-moderated the show since 2014, became the sole leader of the program upon Putney's retirement.

In 1979, WPLG deployed the first helicopter in the Miami market used for newsgathering, known as "Sky 10". The station became well known from 1976 to 1982 for its popular anchor team of Glenn Rinker, Ann Bishop, sports anchor Chuck Dowdle and meteorologist Walter Cronise. In 1982, the station adopted the Eyewitness News format for its newscasts, which was used until its news branding was changed to the generic Channel 10 News in 2001; that year, Rinker left for another position in Orlando and was replaced as evening co-anchor by Mike Schneider. Schneider and Bishop remained paired as the station's lead anchor team until 1986, when Schneider left to become the 5:30 and 11 p.m. co-anchor at CBS flagship station WCBS-TV in New York City and was replaced by general assignment reporter Dwight Lauderdale (who had been working at WPLG since 1976); Lauderdale's appointment as anchor made him the first African-American to anchor a nightly newscast in the South Florida market, and he remained the station's primary evening co-anchor until his retirement in 2008.

Bryan Norcross, who worked at WPLG in the early 1980s before moving to rival station WTVJ, became nationally known as the meteorologist who guided South Florida residents through Hurricane Andrew in 1992, delivering 23 consecutive hours of live on-air coverage during the Category 5 storm. In recognition of his work during Hurricane Andrew, Norcross received Bryan Norcross Day designations in Miami, Miami Beach, and Fort Lauderdale. He later returned to WPLG in 2018 as Hurricane Specialist, a role he held until 2022.

By 1985, WPLG had surpassed rival WTVJ (channel 4, now on channel 6) in the ratings and would dominate the ratings for over ten years. Ann Bishop would continue to serve as co-anchor for the station's evening newscasts until 1995, when she moved to a part-time position at the station until she died from colon cancer in 1997. Don Noe joined WPLG in 1979 and was one of Miami's most popular chief meteorologists (Walter Cronise having moved to the morning newscasts) up until his retirement in 2007; Chuck Dowdle, meanwhile, had left by 1986 for fellow ABC station WSB-TV in Atlanta; his slot was filled by Khambrel Marshall, who later moved to WCIX/WFOR and then to WPLG's then-sister station in Houston, KPRC-TV.

On March 28, 2009, in conjunction with the station's relocation to its Pembroke Park studios, WPLG became the third Miami station to begin broadcasting its local newscasts in high definition. On August 22, 2011, WPLG debuted an hour-long newscast at 5 p.m., which replaced Dr. Phil after it moved back to WFOR-TV; the station had produced an early evening newscast in that timeslot previously until it was replaced by Dr. Phil in 2006. On January 13, 2014, WPLG added an hour-long newscast at 4 p.m. weekdays, which competes against an existing hour-long newscast in that slot on WSVN. On April 27, 2014, WPLG expanded This Week in South Florida to one hour, retaining its 11:30 a.m. timeslot on Sundays. On August 13, 2018, WPLG added a half-hour 3 p.m. weekday newscast; later that fall, it expanded to a full hour.

On March 10, 2021, it was announced that WPLG would start producing newscasts (under the Local 10 News branding) for WSFL-TV, allowing the latter to restore news content in some form to the station after the discontinuation of NewsFix in September 2018. Local 10 News on WSFL-TV began on June 1, 2021, with a two-hour extension of their weekday morning newscast from 7 to 9 a.m., and a nightly newscast during the 10 p.m. hour. WSFL later replaced the WPLG-produced morning newscast with Scripps News' Morning Rush from 8 to 9:30 a.m. on May 6, 2024.

As part of becoming an independent station, WPLG increased its news output from 56 to 93 hours a week. The weekday morning news was extended to 11 a.m., and a weeknight prime time news block from 9 to 11 p.m. (which included the 10 p.m. newscast that formerly aired on WSFL) was added.

=== Sports programming ===
Following the announcement that WPLG would become an independent, the station announced agreements with Fort Lauderdale United FC, of the USL Super League, and HBCU Go, which features college football and men's college basketball from the MEAC, SWAC, SIAC, CIAA, and GCAC conferences.

In October 2025, WPLG announced an agreement with the NBA's Miami Heat to simulcast 12 regular season games with FanDuel Sports Network Sun. As part of the deal, WPLG also aired 12 games featuring the Sioux Falls Skyforce, the Heat's NBA G League affiliate. On June 8, 2026, with the closure of FanDuel Sports Network, it was announced that the Heat would move their regional games to WPLG for the 2026–27 season. WPLG will also stream Heat games and other ancillary content for free via the Local 10+ Platinum app within Miami–Dade, Broward and Monroe counties.

==== Notable current on-air staff ====
- Louis Aguirre – anchor
- Calvin Hughes – anchor
- Will Manso – sports director; also heard during coverage of Miami Hurricanes football on WQAM (560 AM)

==== Notable former on-air staff ====
- Morry Alter – host of The Morry Story (1980s)
- Jack Barry – host of local game show Hole in One in 1962
- Ann Bishop (1970–1995)
- Susan Candiotti
- Jimmy Cefalo – sports anchor
- Liz Cho
- Bertha Coombs
- Victoria Corderi
- Roy Firestone
- Megan Glaros
- Carlos Granda
- Larry King
- Steve Kroft (1977–1980)
- Dwight Lauderdale (1976–2008)
- Max Mayfield – Hurricane Specialist (2007–2019)
- Bryan Norcross – Hurricane Specialist (1983–1990 and 2018–2022)
- Charles Perez – anchor/reporter
- Walter Perez – reporter
- Michael Putney – senior political reporter and host of This Week in South Florida (1989–2022)
- Rob Schmitt
- Richard Schlesinger
- Mike Schneider – 6 and 11 p.m. anchor
- Jon Scott – anchor
- Molly Turner
- Lisa Willis – reporter, fill-in anchor (2001)

== Technical information ==
=== Subchannels ===
WPLG broadcasts from a transmitter facility in Miami Gardens, Florida. Its signal is multiplexed:

Subchannels of WPLG
Subchannel	Res.	Short name	Programming
10.1	720p	WPLG	Main WPLG programming
10.2	480i	Me TV	MeTV
10.3	480i	H & I	Heroes & Icons

WPLG previously carried LATV on its second digital subchannel; the Spanish-language network was replaced by MeTV on April 24, 2012. On January 24, 2013, Post-Newsweek Stations entered into an affiliation agreement to carry the Live Well Network on digital subchannels of WPLG and its then-Orlando sister station WKMG-TV; both stations added the network in April 2013.

=== Analog-to-digital conversion ===
WPLG shut down its analog signal, on VHF channel 10, on June 12, 2009, the official date on which full-power television stations in the United States transitioned from analog to digital broadcasts under federal mandate. The station's digital signal relocated from its pre-transition VHF channel 9 to channel 10 for post-transition operations. Three other local stations (WSVN, WPXM-TV and WLTV-DT) also moved their digital signals to their former analog channel allocation, requiring viewers to rescan their digital tuners. WPLG and WSVN are the only Miami stations that continue to broadcast on the VHF band.

== Out of market coverage ==
WPLG is one of four Miami-based TV stations that are viewed on cable in The Bahamas.
