= WTCN-CD =

Television station in Palm Beach, Florida

- Palm Beach–West Palm Beach, Florida; United States
- City: Palm Beach, Florida
- Channels: Digital: 17 (UHF); Virtual: 43
- Branding: WTCN-TV My 15 (cable channel)

Programming
- Affiliations: 43.1: Independent with MyNetworkTV; for others, see § Subchannels

Ownership
- Owner: Sinclair Broadcast Group; (WTVX Licensee, LLC)
- Sister stations: WTVX, WWHB-CD, WPEC

History
- First air date: October 1988
- Former call signs: W19AQ (1987–1996); WINQ-LP (1996–2002); WWHB-CA (2002–2003); WTCN-CA (2003–2019)
- Former channel numbers: Analog: 19 (UHF, 1988–1999), 43 (UHF, 1999–2012); Digital: 50 (UHF, 2009–2012), 43 (UHF, 2012–2019); Translator: 53 (UHF)
- Former affiliations: Independent (1988–1999); The WB (1999–2006)
- Call sign meaning: Treasure Coast Network

Technical information
- Licensing authority: FCC
- Facility ID: 70865
- ERP: 15 kW
- HAAT: 292.5 m (960 ft)
- Transmitter coordinates: 27°1′32″N 80°10′41.9″W
- Translator(s): WTVX 34.3 Fort Pierce

Links
- Public license information: Public file; LMS
- Website: my15wtcn.com

WTCN-CD (channel 43, cable channel 15) is a low-power, Class A television station licensed to Palm Beach, Florida, United States, serving the West Palm Beach area. It is programmed primarily as an independent station, but maintains a secondary affiliation with MyNetworkTV. WTCN-CD is owned by Sinclair Broadcast Group alongside CBS affiliate WPEC (channel 12), CW affiliate WTVX (channel 34), and WWHB-CD (channel 48). The stations share studios on Fairfield Drive in Mangonia Park (with a West Palm Beach postal address); WTCN-CD's transmitter is located southwest of Hobe Sound, Florida.

Due to WTCN's low-power status, the station's directional antenna pattern prevents it from reaching Vero Beach (to the north) and Boca Raton (to the south). In order to expand the broadcasting radius, WTCN is simulcast in standard definition on WTVX's third digital subchannel (34.3) from a transmitter southwest of Palm City.

WTCN-CD brands as My 15 after the cable channel position on most West Palm Beach area cable providers.

== History ==
WTCN began as W19AQ (known on-air as "WAQ"), a station that began broadcasting as channel 19 in West Palm Beach in October 1988. The original owner was Palm Beach Broadcasting, led by William B. O'Donnell. WAQ had hoped to become an ABC affiliate when WPEC dropped ABC for CBS at the end of 1988, but instead the affiliation went to WPBF. According to the Sun-Sentinel, WAQ's initial programming consisted of "morning cartoons (Beverly Hills Teens); old, public domain (and often silent) movies (Bachelor in Paradise, The Pickwick Papers); vintage TV series (The Man from U.N.C.L.E.); sports (Notre Dame football, Florida Marlins baseball); and music (Hit Video USA, which ran from 1 to 6 a.m.)." The station later carried Howard Stern's original syndicated television program, and tape-delayed races from the Palm Beach Kennel Club.

The station struggled to pay its bills and after declaring bankruptcy in 1991, the license was transferred from the O'Donnell family's company, Palm Beach Broadcasting, to Main Street TV of Carle Place, New York. In 1996, Adelphia Cable removed WAQ from its channel lineup because of "continuing problems with the picture quality", and once again the station filed for bankruptcy. By this point the station was airing home shopping programming, old black and white movies, a local bowling show, and The Cliff Dunn Show, which was simulcast on local radio station WPBR. The loss of cable caused station revenue to drop from $303,315 in 1995 to only $24,995 in 1996. Station advertising rates dropped from $95 for a 30-second spot to as low as $5.

After losing nearly $7 million in 1996, the station changed call letters to WINQ-LP and its studios were moved to the suburb of Lake Park. The station was sold to William B. Turner in 1999 for $875,000 including $175,000 in debt. Martin County businessman Bill Brothers purchased the station for an undisclosed price in 2001. The station then changed its callsign to WWHB-CA and WTCN-CA on August 1, 2002, and January 15, 2003, respectively. In the fall of 2005, CBS/Viacom bought WTCN and sister station WWHB-CA from Bill Brothers for $7.7 million. Local operations were then integrated with WTVX at its facility at Beacon Circle in West Palm Beach. However, master control originated from the studios of WBFS-TV and WFOR-TV on Northwest 18th Terrace in Doral (WFOR served as the flagship of the network-owned cluster, dubbed the "CBS South Florida Television Station Group").

At some point during the first six months of 2005, it began airing Kids' WB programming when the area's primary UPN and secondary WB affiliate WTVX stopped airing it. After its purchase by CBS/Viacom, WTCN became affiliated with The WB, its first full network affiliation. Until that point, WTVX had aired programming from that network after UPN prime time.

On January 24, 2006, CBS Corporation (which split from Viacom in December 2005) and Time Warner's Warner Bros. Entertainment (the division that operated The WB) announced that they would dissolve UPN and The WB, and move some of their programs to a newly created network operated as a joint venture between the companies, The CW Television Network. On the same day, The CW signed a ten-year affiliation agreement with eleven CBS-owned UPN stations, including WTVX. Even without the affiliation deal, that station's full-powered status made it a foregone conclusion that the station would become the CW affiliate for the Gold and Treasure Coasts.

On February 22, News Corporation announced that it would start up another new broadcast television network called MyNetworkTV. This new network, which would be sister to Fox, would be operated by Fox Television Stations and its syndication division 20th Television. WTCN would subsequently become one of only two MyNetworkTV affiliates owned by CBS. In 2006, WTCN placed sixth in the Nielsen ratings in the Palm Beach market with 0.4% of the audience.

On February 7, 2007, CBS agreed to sell seven of its smaller-market stations to Cerberus Capital Management for $185 million. Cerberus formed a new holding company for the stations, Four Points Media Group, which took over the operation of the stations through local marketing agreements in late-June 2007 until the group deal closed on January 10, 2008. At this point in time, local operations of WTVX, WTCN, and WWHB moved to offices on Palm Beach Lakes Boulevard. Master control was eventually moved to Four Points' hub facility at KUTV in Salt Lake City, Utah, on February 25, 2008.

On March 20, 2009, Nexstar Broadcasting Group took over the management of Four Points under a three-year outsourcing agreement. After the digital transition date on June 12, 2009, WTCN began airing on WTVX's previous digital channel (50). At this point, the station's transmitter was relocated to its current location southwest of Hobe Sound.

On September 8, 2011, the Sinclair Broadcast Group announced its intent to purchase Four Points from Cerberus Capital Management for $200 million; Sinclair began managing the stations, including WTCN, under local marketing agreements following antitrust approval. Sinclair subsequently announced its purchase of the entire broadcasting division of Freedom Communications, including WPEC. As a result, Sinclair would now control three of the six largest English-language network affiliations in West Palm Beach. The deal with Sinclair acquiring Four Points was completed on January 3, 2012.

Although WTVX, WTCN, and WWHB initially retained separate operations from WPEC, they eventually moved into WPEC's studios. On May 24, 2012, the FCC granted WTCN a construction permit to air a low-power digital signal on UHF channel 43 (one of its former analog allotments) and become WTCN-CD (with "CD" referring to digital Class A status). Its 15 kW power offers market-wide coverage as opposed to the limited broadcast radius of the former analog signal.

The station began airing sports programming from the American Sports Network syndication package on August 30, 2014.

== Subchannels ==
The station's signal is multiplexed:

Subchannels of WTCN-CD
| Subchannel | Res. | Short name | Programming |
|---|---|---|---|
| 43.1 | 1080i | MyTV | Main WTCN-CD programming |
| 43.2 | 480i | Antenna | Antenna TV |
| 43.3 | 480i | Weather | Weather |
| 43.4 | 480i | Dabl | Dabl |

== See also ==
- Channel 15 branded TV stations in the United States
- Channel 43 low-power TV stations in the United States
