= WTVX =

Television station in Fort Pierce, Florida

- Fort Pierce–West Palm Beach, Florida; United States
- City: Fort Pierce, Florida
- Channels: Digital: 20 (UHF); Virtual: 34
- Branding: West Palm CW 34

Programming
- Affiliations: 34.1: The CW; for others, see § Technical information and subchannels

Ownership
- Owner: Sinclair Broadcast Group; (WTVX Licensee, LLC)
- Sister stations: WPEC; WTCN-CD; WWHB-CD

History
- First air date: April 5, 1966
- Former channel numbers: Analog: 34 (UHF, 1966–2009); Digital: 50 (UHF, 2002–2009); 34 (UHF, 2009–2019)
- Former affiliations: CBS (1966–1989); Independent (1989–1995); UPN (1995–2006); The WB (secondary, 1995–1997 and 2000–2005)

Technical information
- Licensing authority: FCC
- Facility ID: 35575
- ERP: 1,000 kW
- HAAT: 455.7 m (1,495 ft)
- Transmitter coordinates: 27°7′20″N 80°23′19″W

Links
- Public license information: Public file; LMS
- Website: cw34.com

WTVX (channel 34) is a television station licensed to Fort Pierce, Florida, United States, serving the West Palm Beach area as an affiliate of The CW. It is owned by Sinclair Broadcast Group alongside CBS affiliate WPEC (channel 12) and two low-power, Class A stations: WTCN-CD (channel 43) and WWHB-CD (channel 48). The stations share studios on Fairfield Drive in Mangonia Park; WTVX's transmitter is located southwest of Palm City, Florida.

WTVX was established in Fort Pierce in 1966 and was the third—and successful—attempt to sustain a television station in that city. It was the CBS affiliate for areas north of Palm Beach County. In 1980, a new transmitter facility and substantial power increase added the Palm Beaches to its coverage area. A decade later, a network affiliation shuffle in the West Palm Beach market led to WTVX losing its CBS affiliation. After being spurned by ABC, WTVX became an independent station and shut down its news department. The station was sold to Krypton Broadcasting, which soon after struggled through a lengthy bankruptcy case that ended with WTVX being auctioned off. An affiliate of UPN from 1995 to 2006 and The CW since, the station has made several further and short-lived attempts at local news programming.

== History ==
=== Early years ===
Fort Pierce had previously had a television station, WTVI (channel 19), in two separate stints from 1960 to 1962. It had been a money-loser and had failed twice for financial reasons. However, one of the minority owners of WTVI thought the venture was worth trying again in the wake of the All-Channel Receiver Act mandating UHF tuning in television sets. In April 1965, Indian River Television, a company owned by J. Patrick Beacom (mayor of St. Lucie Village) and Bill Minshall, filed to build a new television station on channel 19 in Fort Pierce, which the Federal Communications Commission (FCC) granted on July 28 of that year. The application had been amended to specify channel 34 when the FCC overhauled UHF allotments nationwide that summer.

Indian River then spent $50,000 to acquire the studio and transmitter site along US 1 just south of the St. Lucie–Indian River county line, built for WTVI in 1960, from that station's founder, Gene Dyer. Indian River reinstalled equipment after the structure had been stripped several years prior.

WTVX went on the air on April 5, 1966, after broadcasting a test pattern since March 24. It immediately affiliated with CBS; previously, cable companies had imported Miami CBS affiliate WTVJ (channel 4). However, WTVX could not air every CBS show immediately because some sponsors withheld their programs from the new station. The new station's 26 kW of effective radiated power did not reach past Martin County. Due to WTVX's weak signal, WTVJ continued to claim the Palm Beaches as part of its primary coverage area; when that station opened a news bureau in West Palm Beach in 1970, 12.4 percent of its audience was said to come from Palm Beach County.

After a sale announcement in 1970 was later labeled "premature", the Minshall and Koblegard families—which by this point owned the entirety of the station—reached a deal in 1977 to sell WTVX to Frank Spain, owner of WTWV in Tupelo, Mississippi. However, a federal investigation into station practices was sparked when Edward Trent, an employee who had been fired the previous year, told the FCC that WTVX engaged in an illegal practice known as "clipping", replacing commercials and short credits sequences from network programs with local commercials. The commission proceeded to designate the renewal of WTVX's broadcast license for hearing on the matter. WTVX admitted to carrying out clipping in June 1978, claiming it had done so because it had oversold ad time; the station ultimately had its license renewed and paid a $10,000 fine. That allowed the sale of WTVX to Frank Spain to proceed.

=== Palm Beach expansion and blackout lawsuit ===
Spain launched a major capital campaign to improve the station's facilities. More than $5 million was put into WTVX, including newer and larger Fort Pierce studios on North 25th Street (SR 615) and the commissioning of a 1,549-foot (472 m) tower after some early county opposition. It featured the most powerful UHF transmitter in Florida, operating at the UHF maximum of 5 million watts. The station finally had a signal capable of reaching the Palm Beaches, filling what had been something of a donut hole in CBS coverage. In addition, the more powerful WTVX began appearing on Palm Beach County cable systems that had not previously carried it, further extending its reach.

It's [declining attendance] a disturbing trend, but one that can be reversed. We can reverse it by winning, getting into the Super Bowl, getting a new stadium and getting television stations like that one in Fort Pierce off our backs.

— Joe Robbie, September 1980

Although the station came to dominate the Treasure Coast with its improved facilities, the upgraded signal brought an end to a special arrangement. From 1972 to 1979, with the approval of CBS and NBC, WTVX carried Miami Dolphins home games that would have to be blacked out by West Palm Beach stations because their signals reached into the 75-mile (121 km) blackout radius around the Miami Orange Bowl; hotels on Singer Island invested in antenna systems to receive WTVX and attract patrons when Dolphins games were blacked out. (The earliest such telecast was Super Bowl II in 1968.) After fighting the Dolphins and the league in court for two years at an estimated cost to Spain of $250,000, the station lost its fight against NFL blackout policies in appeals court in 1982 and opted not to continue.

=== Loss of CBS affiliation and independence ===
In 1987, a series of events began in Miami that would culminate in WTVX being left without a network affiliation.

That January, NBC bought WTVJ, which was contracted to be a CBS affiliate through the end of 1988. CBS then affiliated with and bought WCIX (channel 6), Miami's Fox affiliate, to carry its programming beginning at the start of 1989. Technical limitations stemming from the addition of channel 6 to Miami several years after the other VHF assignments and the need to maintain spacing to channel 6 in Orlando meant that WCIX's transmitter was sited further south than the other Miami stations. This left key areas of Broward County having to rely on translator stations or cable to watch WCIX. CBS feared a loss of service in Broward, and WTVX's signal did not reach this area. After contacting both of the VHF stations in West Palm Beach—NBC affiliate WPTV-TV (channel 5) and ABC affiliate WPEC (channel 12)—it reached a deal with WPEC.

This put ABC in the position of searching for a new affiliate among three stations: WTVX, West Palm Beach Fox affiliate WFLX (channel 29), and WPBF (channel 25), a station whose studios were under construction in Palm Beach Gardens and which was projected to sign on as an independent. Conventional wisdom when the WPEC switch to CBS was announced gave WTVX a strong chance of emerging with the ABC hookup. WTVX was the most established of the three stations and the only one with a functioning news department. Bob Morford, the news director, told his staff in a memo, "The bottom line for WTVX is that we expect we will become the next ABC affiliate for this market." In September, officials from the three stations made presentations to ABC executives in New York. WTVX was seen as being in the lead, with its established operation, but it was not based in West Palm Beach, the largest city in the media market. WFLX had solid ratings and viewership that extended into Broward County, though it had no news department. However, WPBF was cited by media as a "dark horse" and by WPTV's general manager as a "sleeper" because of its proposed technical facilities and the track record of one of its owners, John H. Phipps, in running Tallahassee-area CBS affiliate WCTV, one of the most successful television stations in the country.

In October, ABC handed down its decision: it had selected WPBF, which had offered to pay the first-ever fee to affiliate with a network. Longstanding industry practice called for networks to pay affiliates. The news reverberated with a thud in Fort Pierce; Morford cited his station's location as a disadvantage and believed that ABC was more interested in affiliating with a West Palm Beach–area station instead. The very same officials that just two months prior had stated they had "not even contemplated" life as an independent stared independence straight in the face. Morford declared the 35-person news staff would remain and that the station would reinforce its commitment to local news. Morford noted that, while movies and syndicated shows would be on the new lineup, "the world does not need another movie channel". Meanwhile, Frank Spain put WTVX on the market in November, trying to gauge its value without a network affiliation; he opted not to take the various offers that ranged from $9 to $24 million—half the $49 million value it had as a CBS affiliate.

On January 1, 1989, the affiliation switch took effect, and WTVX relaunched as a general-entertainment independent with a lineup heavy on syndicated shows and news. The loss of CBS programming cost the station two-thirds of its total-day audience and 60 percent of its prime time audience. WTVX initially moved its late local newscast to 10 p.m., the first such program in the Palm Beach/Treasure Coast market. A Maryland real estate developer obtained an option to buy the station, but no deal was ever reached, and WTVX came off the market for a second time. However, by April 1990, the station was courting three suitors, and though Frank Spain initially backed out at the eleventh hour of a deal with Krypton Broadcasting, the firm, owned by Elvin Feltner of Singer Island, reached an agreement to spend $8 million to purchase WTVX. The purchase was part of a long-term plan to own 12 television stations in Florida. The sale was approved in February 1991 and consummated that April.

=== Krypton bankruptcy and Whitehead Media ownership ===
Krypton, which also owned WNFT in Jacksonville and WABM in Birmingham, Alabama, soon found itself in financial trouble. In January 1992, Krypton missed a payment on a $19 million loan it had received two years prior from Dutch bank Internationale Nederlanden Bank N.V., and in June, the bank sued, seeking its money. While attempting to buy a fourth station, WQTV in Boston, in 1993, several program suppliers asked a federal court to order WNFT and WTVX into bankruptcy. By August 1993, 26 cases had been filed against Feltner for debts owed, ranging from the 1990 loan to $1,300 in condominium association fees. WTVX owed $3.3 million to program distributors including Columbia Pictures, MCA Television, Warner Bros., Paramount Television, and 20th Century Fox, while former station employees recalled that tapes of programs they no longer had rights to air were being shipped from Jacksonville to Fort Pierce to air on WTVX before the companies obtained an injunction against such activity. Also in August, the Alabama station joined its Florida sisters in bankruptcy.

In a court-ordered settlement in October 1993, Feltner relinquished all day-to-day control of WTVX and WNFT. A December report from a federal examiner, Soneet Kapila, suggested turning over their operations to a trustee. Kapila noted that Feltner had spurned an offer from Paxson Communications Corporation, which at the time was pursuing an entrance into television, for all three stations. He found that the Krypton stations needed an infusion of new capital and that they could not be sold if Feltner was still involved.

Even though Feltner was able to settle the suit filed by Internationale Nederlanden Bank in March 1994, and Feltner sued the syndicators alleging a conspiracy to hurt his stations, it was not enough. Columbia Pictures won an $8.8 million claim in the WTVX–WNFT case in July, when a federal judge found the stations had committed willful copyright infringement (in 1995, MCA would win a $9 million judgment upheld in 1997), and in September, the same week WTVX secured affiliation with the new United Paramount Network (UPN) for 1995, the stations were ordered to auction in October.

Five companies placed initial bids on WTVX. A firm backed by the chief operating officer for the two stations, Dan Dayton; local radio station owner Amaturo Group (which proposed to turn over operations to WPEC); WPFP, a company bankrolled by WFLX owner Malrite Communications; and Price Communications, which once owned radio stations in West Palm Beach, all lost out to a $12.65 million bid by Whitehead Media, owned by Silver King Broadcasting vice president Eddie Whitehead and financed by Paxson (which had just purchased WPBF). A judge approved the winning bids for WTVX and WNFT; Feltner unsuccessfully challenged the Whitehead sale, claiming that Paxson's hand in operations would constitute a then-illegal duopoly. The FCC tossed his challenge in early June, allowing Whitehead Media to close on the sale and enter into a local marketing agreement (LMA) with Paxson to supply its programming.

Even before the Whitehead deal closed, WTVX had begun to turn itself around. With UPN programming as well as an affiliation with The WB, and a trustee at the helm, fiscal improvements were felt at the station. When Whitehead assumed control, it fired some of the station's 43 staffers, including the general manager, and operations moved from Fort Pierce to WPBF's Palm Beach Gardens studios, with its transmitter facility and use of WPBF's Treasure Coast bureau as a sales office remaining its only presence on the Treasure Coast. (WTCE-TV, the Trinity Broadcasting Network station in Fort Pierce, then occupied the studio building.)

=== Paramount/Viacom/CBS ownership ===
Paxson Communications Corporation's businesses were rapidly shifting in the mid-1990s. Most notable was the development of a chain of major-market UHF television stations that primarily broadcast infomercials, Infomall TV (inTV). The ownership of network-affiliated WPBF and operation of WTVX did not fit this mold. In order to concentrate on Infomall TV and its Florida radio properties, Paxson retained an advisor in July 1996 to help it analyze a potential sale of the stations. Rumors ran hot about potential buyers for the pair, including The Walt Disney Company, which had just purchased ABC.

After Paxson decided to shop the two stations to separate acquirers, WTVX was the first to find a buyer: the Paramount Stations Group, which paid $34.3 million. (Because of an overlapping contour with WBFS-TV in Miami, which it owned, the license assets were assigned to another company, Straightline Communications, which then leased them to Paramount along with those of WLWC in New Bedford, Massachusetts.) When Paramount took control, it made two immediate changes: it dropped The WB, UPN's chief competitor (from which it only aired prime time shows at times not conflicting with UPN), and it moved operations to Miami, retaining a West Palm Beach office for sales, engineering, and a public affairs staffer.

In 2000, after the FCC legalized television duopolies, Paramount parent company Viacom merged with CBS, which additionally owned WFOR-TV in Miami, and purchased WTVX outright. All three stations were run from Miami under one general manager. That same year, WB programming returned to WTVX, once again airing in off hours on channel 34; the entire network lineup moved from WTCN-CA to WTVX in April 2002 but returned to WTCN in 2005. When UPN and WB merged to form The CW in 2006, WTVX was among 11 charter CBS-owned stations to be announced as an outlet of the new service.

=== Four Points and Sinclair ownership ===
CBS agreed to sell a package of smaller-market TV stations, including WTVX, WTCN-CA, and WWHB-CA, in February 2007 to Cerberus Capital Management for $185 million. Cerberus formed a new holding company for the stations, Four Points Media Group, and closed on the deal on January 10, 2008. On March 20, 2009, Nexstar Broadcasting Group took over the management of Four Points under a three-year outsourcing agreement.

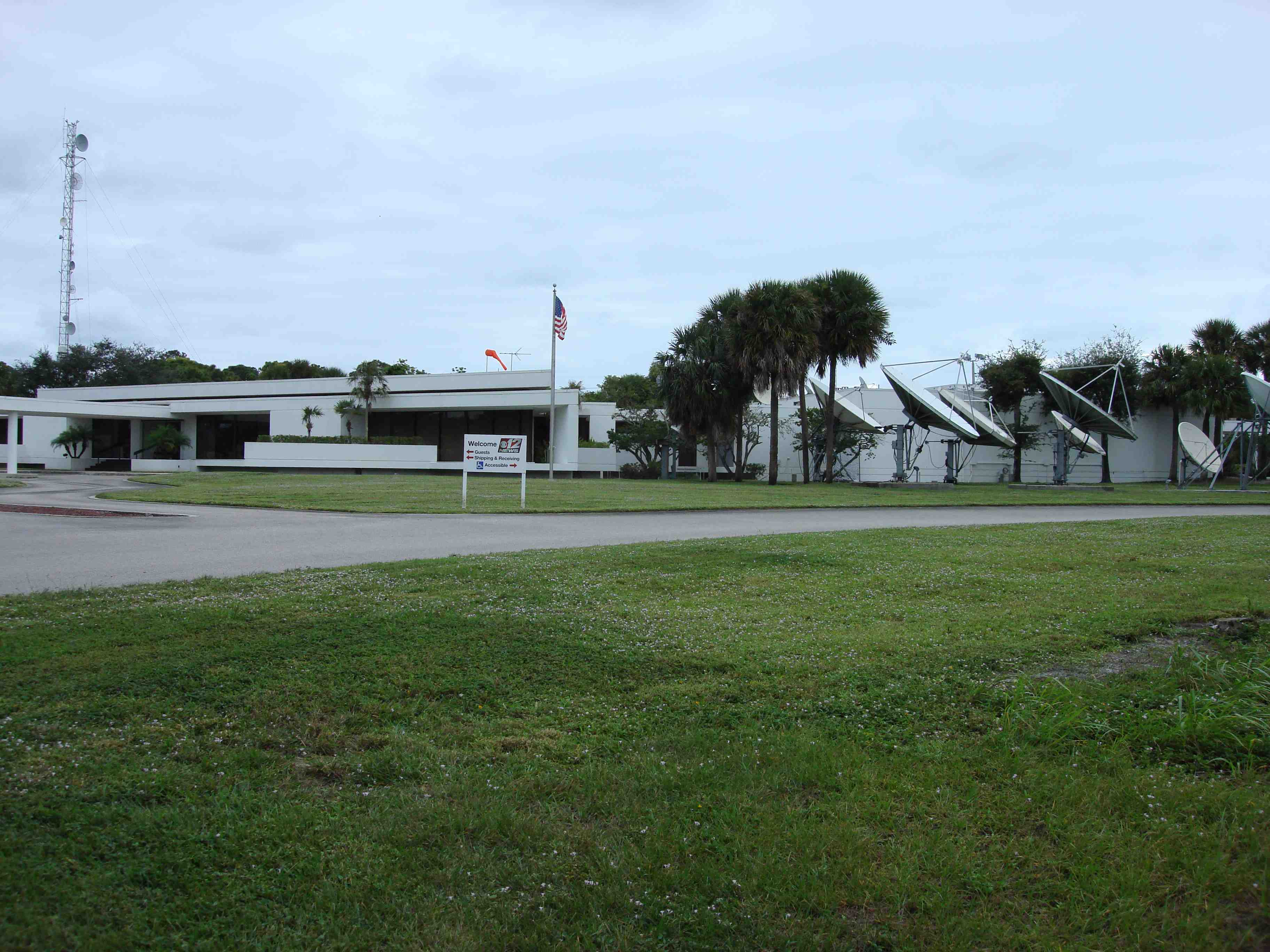
The WPEC studios in Mangonia Park

On September 8, 2011, the Sinclair Broadcast Group announced its intent to purchase Four Points from Cerberus Capital Management for $200 million. Sinclair then began managing the stations (including WTVX, WTCN, WWHB, and WLWC) under local marketing agreements following antitrust approval by the Federal Trade Commission (FTC). Within months of announcing the Four Points deal, Sinclair moved to acquire the television station division of Freedom Communications, which included WPEC. The deal with Sinclair acquiring Four Points was completed on January 3, 2012.

== Newscasts ==
=== As a CBS affiliate ===
As a CBS affiliate, WTVX operated a local news department from its main studios in Fort Pierce, and after 1980, newsrooms in Stuart and West Palm Beach. It generally fought WPEC for second place behind WPTV, with its viewership concentrated on the Treasure Coast.

As of August 5, the 'T' in WTVX will stand for 'television', the 'X' will stand for 'generic programming' and the 'V' will stand for the 'void' left by the departure of news.

— Curt Fonger, WTVX news anchor, on his station without local news

When WTVX went independent, it initially maintained its newscasts, launching the first 10 p.m. newscast in the West Palm Beach market. However, station management discovered the newscasts attracted an audience incompatible with the rest of WTVX's programming. Ratings fell considerably, and WTVX spent the first several months of the year cutting newscast after newscast (ending up with just 5:30, 6, and 11 p.m. newscasts), while the news staff dropped from 40 to 16 people, and many of those that remained began to look for jobs elsewhere. The weekend newscast was axed in June 1989, and the station then proceeded to shutter its news department altogether on August 4. The market's Big Three affiliates, all based in West Palm Beach, each bought time on WTVX's final broadcast to woo its news viewers and promote their coverage of the Treasure Coast.

=== Newscasts in the 1990s and 2000s ===
In 1996, WTVX started a 10 p.m. newscast produced by WPBF, which featured such elements as yellow graphics, a faster pace, and a segment of Treasure Coast news. It was not a ratings success and was dropped after only a year, upon the sale to Paramount.

It seems like a little thing when it happens, but when you mispronounce Pompano Beach one time, people know that you're not around.

— Fields Moseley, KUTV–WTVX news anchor, on the challenges of anchoring a Florida local newscast from Utah

Four Points would make a second, short-lived attempt at starting local news using a hybrid approach from 2008 to 2009, sensing an opportunity to provide an alternative to WFLX's newscast. The half-hour CW West Palm News at Ten was produced using local reporters in the market—with a total of 30 West Palm Beach-based staff—and news and weather presenters at KUTV in Salt Lake City.

=== Newscasts from WPEC ===
On March 3, 2014, WPEC replaced its 7 p.m. newscast with a new 10 p.m. newscast on WTVX. WTVX eventually added simulcasts of WPEC's 9 a.m. and noon newscasts and an airing of Sinclair's Full Measure with Sharyl Attkisson, replacing the late newscast with airings of Sinclair's national news program The National Desk (which is also seen in the morning). Under the name Sharyl Thompson, Attkisson had started in television as a reporter at WTVX from 1982 to 1985.

== Technical information and subchannels ==
WTVX's transmitter is located southwest of Palm City, Florida. The station's signal is multiplexed:

Subchannels of WTVX
Subchannel	Res.	Short name	Programming
34.1	1080i	CW	The CW
34.2	480i	Catchy	Catchy Comedy
34.3	480i	MyTV	WTCN-CD in SD
34.5	1080i	CBS	CBS (WPEC) UHF simulcast
48.1	480i	ROAR	Roar (WWHB-CD)

Simulcast of subchannels of another station
Broadcast on behalf of another station

In 2022, WWHB-CD's main subchannel began to be officially hosted on WTVX as part of the deployment of ATSC 3.0 (Next Gen TV) on WWHB-CD, though WTVX itself is not broadcast in 3.0.

=== Analog-to-digital conversion ===
WTVX began broadcasting a digital signal in November 2002. It ended regular programming on its analog signal, over UHF channel 34, in December 2008. The station's digital signal relocated from its pre-transition UHF channel 50 to channel 34. It was then moved to channel 20 in the repack.
