= WPBF =

Television station in Tequesta, Florida

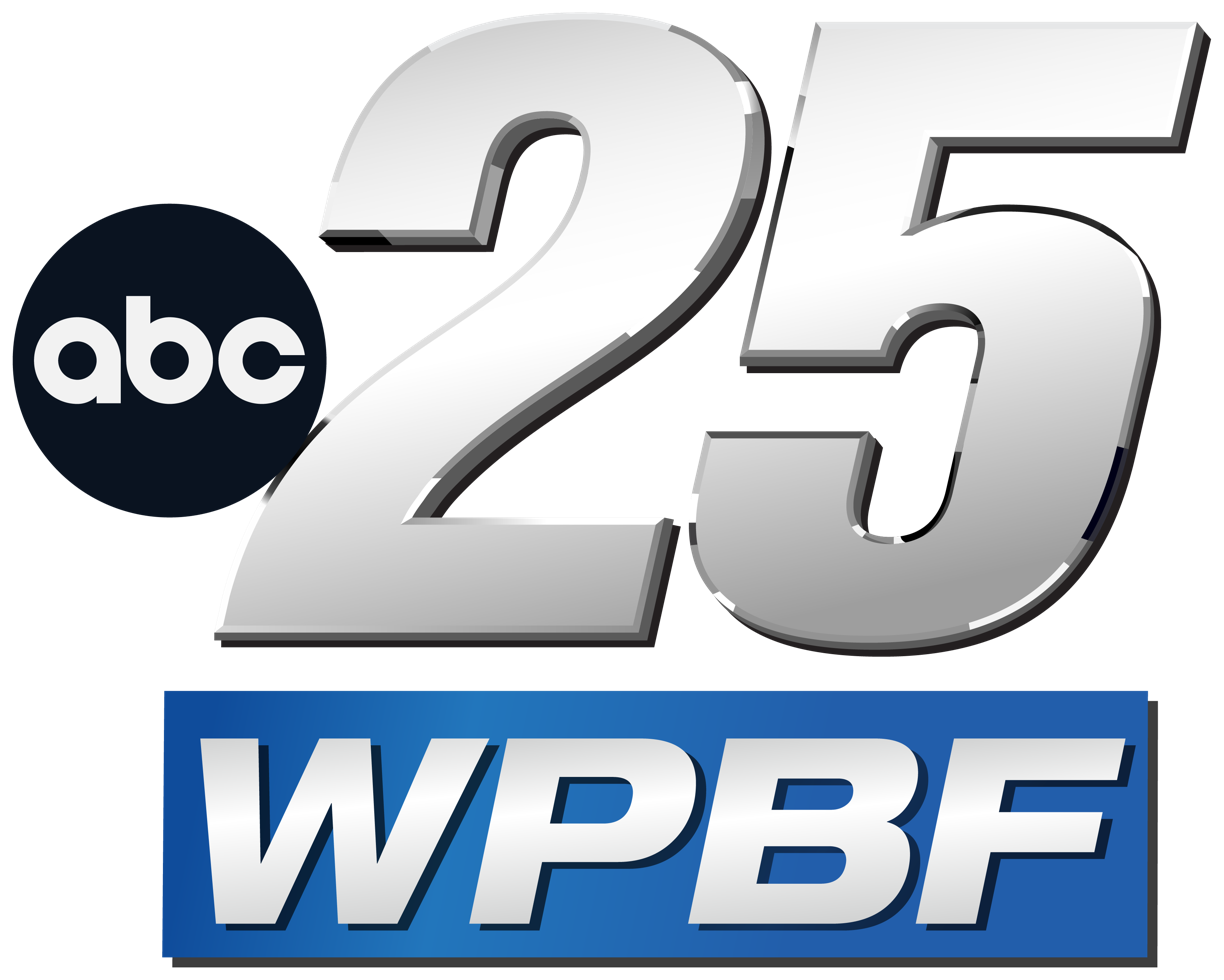
- Tequesta–West Palm Beach, Florida; United States
- City: Tequesta, Florida
- Channels: Digital: 16 (UHF); Virtual: 25
- Branding: WPBF 25; WPBF 25 News

Programming
- Affiliations: 25.1: ABC; for others, see § Subchannels

Ownership
- Owner: Hearst Television; (Hearst Properties Inc.)

History
- First air date: January 1, 1989
- Former channel number: Analog: 25 (UHF, 1989–2009)
- Call sign meaning: West Palm Beach, Florida

Technical information
- Licensing authority: FCC
- Facility ID: 51988
- ERP: 1,000 kW
- HAAT: 450 m (1,476 ft)
- Transmitter coordinates: 27°7′19″N 80°23′41″W

Links
- Public license information: Public file; LMS
- Website: www.wpbf.com

WPBF (channel 25) is a television station licensed to Tequesta, Florida, United States, serving the West Palm Beach area as an affiliate of ABC. Owned by Hearst Television, the station maintains studios on RCA Boulevard in the Monet section of Palm Beach Gardens and a transmitter in Palm City southwest of I-95.

Thirteen applicants sought channel 25 in Tequesta, which was awarded to a group that proposed closed-captioned news programming. Nearly all of the company was then sold to a partnership of John H. Phipps and Alan Potamkin. While channel 25 intended to be an independent station, the ABC affiliation unexpectedly became available as a result of an affiliation switch that started in the Miami market and spread to West Palm Beach. Even though it was not on the air, WPBF obtained the ABC affiliation—surprising industry observers—and set television precedent as the first station to pay a network to affiliate.

After hastily building its facilities and news department, WPBF launched on January 1, 1989, with ABC programming from its first day on air. However, it debuted at third in the local news ratings and struggled economically for several years. Channel 25 was owned in the mid-1990s by Florida-based Paxson Communications Corporation, though Paxson soon focused on developing its own national network and decided to sell WPBF, its only major network affiliate. Hearst acquired channel 25 in 1997 and lifted the station from third to second place in local news audience.

== History ==
=== Start-up ===
In 1985, the Federal Communications Commission (FCC) designated 13 applications for a new television station on channel 25 in Tequesta, Florida, for comparative hearing. The field thinned to six before an administrative law judge gave the initial nod to Martin Telecommunications in July 1986, citing its ownership by a Hispanic woman, Betty Heisler, and its proposal to air closed captioning on all of its news programs. Martin Telecommunications's entirely Hispanic ownership beat out a bid from Triple J Properties, a group of three women and Tequesta residents. Several of the competing applicants appealed the award to Martin Telecommunications, and during that time, another firm, Tequesta Television secured additional investors and paid Martin and the other groups, anxious to avoid years of legal challenges, to drop their bids, clearing the way for Tequesta to be awarded the construction permit. The two additional investors that would own 98 percent of the company were John H. Phipps, who had built WPTV in West Palm Beach in 1956 and owned Tallahassee-area CBS affiliate WCTV, and Alan Potamkin, an owner of car dealerships in Miami.

By the summer of 1988, negotiations were nearly being concluded on the former RCA site in Palm Beach Gardens, but no programming plans had been made public, nor had the tower been constructed. This caught the attention of local broadcasters because of impending turmoil in the Miami area. In 1987, NBC had bought WTVJ, the CBS affiliate in Miami; its existing contract with WSVN (channel 7) did not end until the end of 1988. CBS, in shopping for a new station in Miami, acquired WCIX, which broadcast on channel 6. Because channel 6 was also assigned in the Orlando area, WCIX's antenna had to be located further south than the other Miami stations, with the result being that key areas of Broward County were poorly served without translator stations or cable. CBS's existing affiliate for Palm Beach County and points north, WTVX in Fort Pierce, had only added significant coverage in Palm Beach County in 1980, when it made a major facility upgrade, and it was a UHF station. Rumors began to emerge that WPBF would be involved in a swap that could affect up to six stations. However, Phipps and Potamkin began buying programming with an eye to making the new WPBF the second independent station in the West Palm Beach market.

CBS rectified its Broward County problem by poaching WPEC (channel 12) in West Palm Beach from ABC. That put ABC on the hunt for a new affiliate and started a three-way battle. The contenders were WTVX, the outgoing CBS affiliate with an existing news department; WFLX (channel 29), a successful Fox affiliate and independent station; and WPBF, a station that was not even on the air. In September, officials from these three stations made presentations to ABC executives in New York. WTVX was seen as being in the lead, with its established operation, but it was not based in West Palm Beach, the largest city in the media market; WFLX had solid ratings and viewership even into Broward County, though it had no news department; but WPBF was cited by media as a "dark horse" and by WPTV's general manager as a "sleeper" because of its proposed technical facilities and the track record of Phipps in running WCTV, one of the most successful television stations in the country.

ABC announced its choice on October 18, 1988: in a move that stunned broadcasters and the other two contenders vying for the affiliation, it selected WPBF. George Newi, the head of affiliate relations for ABC, noted the track record of Phipps in Tallahassee as a decision. It also helped that Phipps was willing to pay for the affiliation, forking over an estimated $1 million (equivalent to $2.7 million in 2025) at a time when networks typically compensated stations for carrying their programs; it was the first time a station had ever paid for a network affiliation, known in the industry as reverse compensation. In addition, WPBF agreed to cover most of its startup promotional costs. The decision drew fire from the competitors. Murray Green, general manager of WFLX, called the decision "ludicrous" for awarding the affiliation to a station that was not even broadcasting yet. Bob Morford, the news director for WTVX, felt that "ABC is apparently under the impression that it's better to sign on a new station in Palm Beach" than align with an outlet in Fort Pierce. The precedent-setting reverse compensation deal, which was said to make affiliates of ABC "very nervous", was so unusual that it spurred an editorial in Electronic Media calling the idea of selling affiliations to the highest bidder a "dangerously short-sighted move" with the potential to destabilize the industry.

The decision put Phipps and Potamkin on the clock to finish construction of WPBF. As late as November 10, the studio building was an empty warehouse; equipment had to be ordered and installed and a staff assembled. The transmitter was turned on with days to go, and WPBF made it to air on January 1, 1989—a half-hour later than planned, because an engineer overslept. However, the station struggled in its early years with signal issues in southern Palm Beach County, channel slot issues on some cable systems, and difficulty establishing viewer loyalty. This was particularly acute because WPLG, the Miami ABC affiliate, was widely available on cable. These issues and the early 1990s recession, which softened the local advertising market, led to deep cuts. Between July and October 1991, WPBF dismissed more than 30 percent of its staff, and Capital Cities/ABC forgave $500,000 (equivalent to $1.2 million in 2025) in affiliation fees that the station had pledged to pay its network.

=== Paxson and Hearst ownership ===
While Phipps and Potamkin never placed WPBF up for sale, they received an unexpected offer in late 1993 and accepted it at the start of 1994. The buyer was Clearwater-based Paxson Communications Corporation, which at the time owned radio stations in several major cities across the state but no television properties. Founder Lowell Paxson vowed that WPBF would not be its last Florida TV station. He also deepened his involvement in the West Palm Beach area, buying the former Woolworth Donahue estate in Palm Beach for $12 million (equivalent to $25.4 million in 2025) to live there and a West Palm Beach office building to serve as his corporate headquarters. Paxson also supported the purchase of WTVX out of bankruptcy court by Whitehead Media in 1995, providing financing and assuming control over operations via a local marketing agreement (LMA).

Paxson's increasing business interests focusing on infomercial programming—the seeds for what became Ion Television—and radio in Florida led the company to sell the West Palm Beach station. In 1996, Paxson hired an investment firm to consult it on a sale of WPBF and its LMA with WTVX or a trade with another station. Several buyers were rumored, including the ABC network itself, but Paxson took the stations off the market for the short-term, even though he still desired to sell WPBF, his only network affiliate. WTVX was ultimately sold to the Paramount Stations Group, the owner of the UPN network it broadcast; the LMA structure made it easier to separate the two stations at sale.

In March 1997, Paxson reached a deal to sell WPBF to the Hearst Corporation for $85 million (equivalent to $170.5 million in 2025), more than double what he had paid for it and for a cash flow multiple higher than the industry average.

== News operation ==
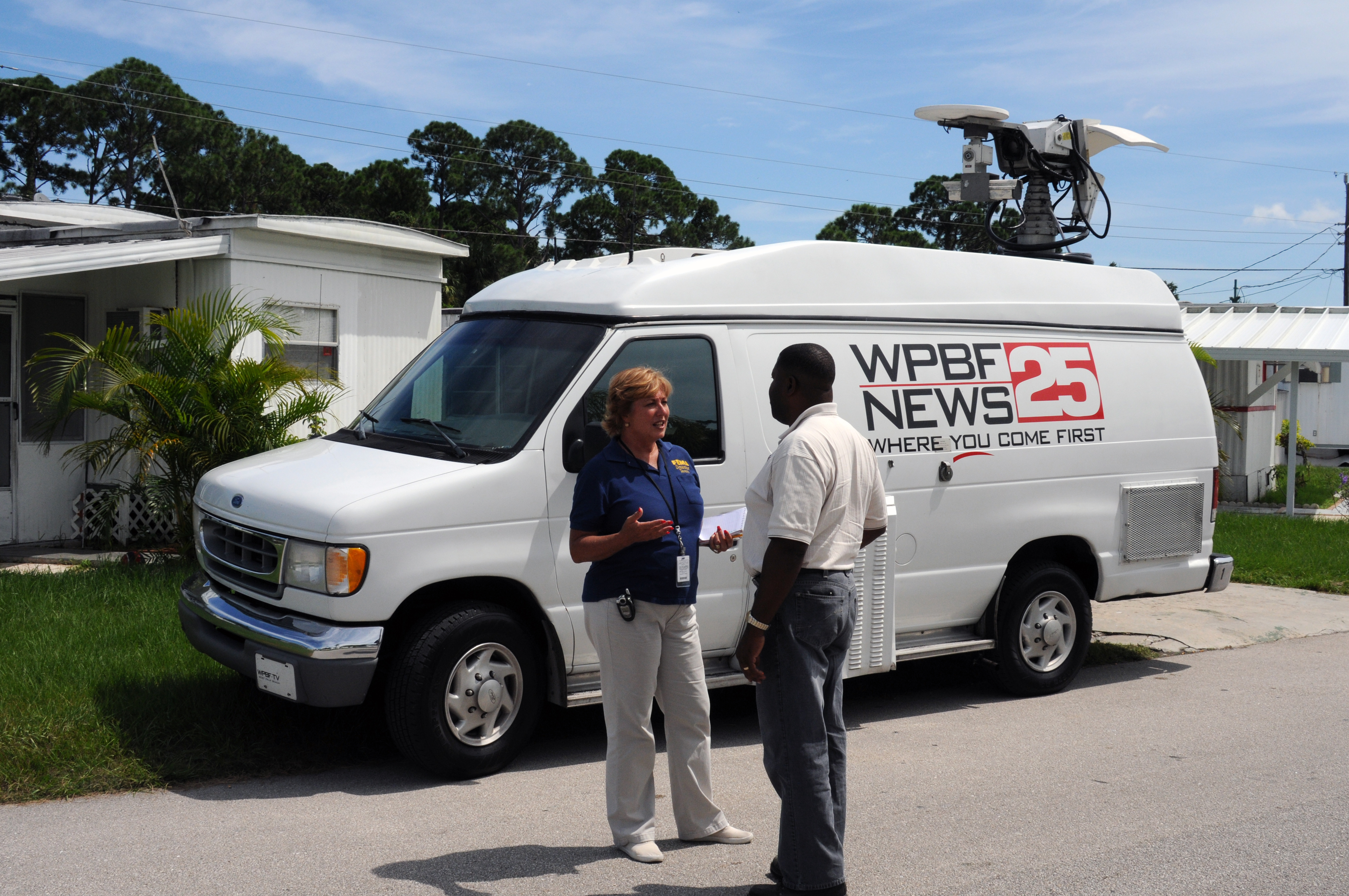
A WPBF reporter interviews a Federal Emergency Management Agency public information officer after Tropical Storm Fay in 2008

The same haste with which WPBF was built extended to the news department. Founding news director Lee Polowczuk started on November 14; within 50 days, after receiving hundreds of unsolicited audition tapes from around the country, the news department was up and running. Newscasts started on the station's second day of broadcasting, originating from a room intended for use as a prop closet until the actual newsroom could be finished. Most of the original news talent had worked in other Florida markets, including ex-WTVJ anchors Jim Brosemer and Marc Goldberg, as well as Sheila O'Connor, who had worked in Orlando.

The local newscasts from WPBF debuted in third place in the ratings behind the two other West Palm Beach stations; the newly independent WTVX shuttered its news department in August 1989. Phipps and Potamkin made another expansion of the news staff in 1990, bringing it to 67 people, in an effort to lift the station out of third. Closed captioning on the local newscasts—the promise that had once earned Heisler a favorable opinion at the FCC—was instituted in 1990; with all three local newsrooms doing so within a span of several months, West Palm Beach became one of just two markets nationally in which all local newscasts were captioned. However, the station's cuts meant that, by 1991, there were fewer full-time reporters than at WPTV or WPEC; even weekend newscasts were briefly suspended. Under Paxson ownership, WPBF received a new news set. It also briefly produced a 10 p.m. newscast for WTVX. However, ratings did not improve.

Third-place continued to be WPBF's finish in the early years under Hearst, but ratings began to improve in 2000, attributed to improvements made by the new ownership. This included the 1999 launch of a morning newscast, years after WPTV and WPEC. However, ratings continued to be an issue. In 2003, the station dropped separate sports segments in its newscasts. In one shake-up, the 11 p.m. newscast was retooled with a three-anchor format.

In the mid-2000s, the station finally found a formula that improved its ratings, one centered around weather: forecasts were moved to the lead story in each WPBF newscast. After seeing ratings increases, channel 25 added 4 p.m. and 5:30 a.m. newscasts in 2006. Weekend morning and weekday 5 a.m. newscasts were added in 2008. The steady climb made WPBF a solid contender for second alongside WPEC by 2014, though both stations still trailed longtime market leader WPTV. After The Ellen DeGeneres Show ended its run in 2022, WPBF reintroduced a 4 p.m. news hour. The next year, the station debuted a 10 p.m. newscast on its MeTV subchannel, lengthened its noon news to an hour, and launched a weekly public affairs show, On the Record. By January 2024, WPBF led in local news ratings at 5, 6, and 11 p.m., with WPTV coming in second in all three time slots.

=== Notable former on-air talent ===
- Victor Blackwell, anchor
- Stefan Holt, reporter and anchor
- Glenn Schwartz, meteorologist

== Technical information ==
=== Subchannels ===
WPBF's transmitter is located in Palm City, southwest of I-95. The station's signal is multiplexed:

Subchannels of WPBF
Subchannel	Res.	Short name	Programming
25.1	720p	WPBF	ABC
25.2	480i	ESTRELL	Estrella TV
25.3	480i	CRIME	True Crime Network
25.4	480i	STORY	Story Television
25.5	480i	MeTV	MeTV
48.4	480i	Rewind	Rewind TV (WWHB-CD)

Broadcast on behalf of another station

Estrella TV was added as a subchannel in 2009, replacing a weather subchannel. The Rewind TV subchannel of WWHB-CD moved to the WPBF multiplex in March 2022, when that station became the first West Palm Beach market transmitter for ATSC 3.0 (NextGen TV). In exchange, WPBF is hosted in that format on the WWHB-CD multiplex.

=== Analog-to-digital conversion ===
WPBF discontinued regular programming on its analog signal, over UHF channel 25, at 11:59 p.m. on June 12, 2009, the official date on which full-power television stations in the United States transitioned from analog to digital broadcasts under federal mandate. The station's digital signal remained on its pre-transition UHF channel 16, using virtual channel 25.

As part of the SAFER Act, WPBF kept its analog signal on the air until July 12 to inform viewers of the digital television transition through a loop of public service announcements from the National Association of Broadcasters.
