= WBFS-TV =

Television station in Miami

- Miami–Fort Lauderdale, Florida; United States
- City: Miami, Florida
- Channels: Digital: 32 (UHF); Virtual: 33
- Branding: CW Miami 33

Programming
- Affiliations: 33.1: The CW; for others, see § Subchannels

Ownership
- Owner: CBS Television Stations; (Miami Television Station WBFS Inc.)
- Sister stations: WFOR-TV

History
- Founded: February 2, 1983
- First air date: December 9, 1984
- Former channel numbers: Analog: 33 (UHF, 1984–2009)
- Former affiliations: Independent (1984–1995, 2022–2024); UPN (1995–2006); FoxBox/4KidsTV (secondary, 2002–2008); MyNetworkTV (2006–2022)

Technical information
- Licensing authority: FCC
- Facility ID: 12497
- ERP: 1,000 kW
- HAAT: 296.9 m (974 ft)
- Transmitter coordinates: 25°58′8″N 80°13′19″W

Links
- Public license information: Public file; LMS
- Website: www.cbsnews.com/miami/

WBFS-TV (channel 33) is a television station in Miami, Florida, United States, affiliated with The CW. It is owned by the CBS Television Stations group alongside WFOR-TV (channel 4), a CBS owned-and-operated station. The two stations share studios on Northwest 18th Terrace in Doral; WBFS-TV's transmitter is located in Andover, Florida.

WBFS-TV was established in 1984 as the fourth attempt at activating the channel for full-power use in Miami, and the first to be successful. It was the first station signed on by the Grant Broadcasting System, and would be by far the most successful due to Grant's aggressive approach to program purchasing and promotion. While these practices made WBFS a competitive independent in South Florida, they also sent Grant into receivership within three years. After being owned by a consortium of Grant's creditors throughout the late 1980s and early 1990s, the Paramount Stations Group reached a deal to purchase WBFS-TV in 1994, resulting in the station joining UPN in 1995; however, WBFS-TV was passed over for affiliation with The CW in 2006 and affiliated instead with MyNetworkTV, airing that service's offerings until 2022. After two years as an independent, the station became the Miami-market CW affiliate in September 2024. Its operations were consolidated with WFOR in 2001, and since then WFOR has occasionally produced newscasts for WBFS.

== History ==
=== Three unbuilt construction permits ===
Channel 33, allocated to Miami since the introduction of ultra high frequency (UHF) channel assignments in 1952, went unused by a full-power station for more than 30 years. There had been some activity around it when it was first assigned, drawing two applicants; the Miami Biscayne Television Corporation obtained the construction permit, but it went unbuilt. In the 1960s, three bids were made to start a channel 33 station, by Gem Broadcasting, proposing an all-Spanish-language station; and Supreme Broadcasting; Gem was replaced by Gateway Television Corporation, led by Miamian and former Federal Communications Commission (FCC) attorney Vincent B. Welch. Gateway was awarded the construction permit in 1964 after the other two firms dropped out of the running.

Gateway abandoned its bid by 1966, and Hialeah food processor Budd Mayer filed for the channel, proposing subscription television (STV) operation using the Telemeter system. Gold Coast obtained a construction permit in March 1967, though no station ever materialized. In the meantime, beginning in 1974, WCIX (channel 6), hampered by a poor signal in Broward County, began operating a translator on channel 33.

=== "Florida's Super Station" ===
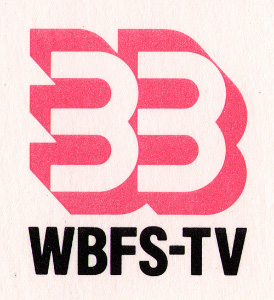
WBFS's original Grant double-sided logo, used from 1984 to 1995.

In 1977, Miami STV Inc., a company owned by the Block family of Milwaukee, filed with the FCC for authority to build channel 33. Like Gold Coast of a decade earlier, Miami STV was aligned with a subscription television operation, in this case SelecTV. Miami STV was granted a construction permit in July 1980, with the FCC turning down an application for a high-power satellite of WCIX in the process; the owners proposed a hybrid service of ad-supported and subscription programs, similar to what WKID was already broadcasting on channel 51.

The call letters WBFS-TV were assigned under Block in February 1983; that November, the Shlenker Group, which owned KTXH in Houston and KTXA in Fort Worth, Texas, filed to buy a majority stake in the unbuilt station from Miami STV for $46,250. Shlenker would finance construction; in exchange, plans for STV operation would be dropped. At the end of 1983, the WCIX channel 33 translator was shut down.

From the new Guy Gannett tower adjacent to US 441, WBFS-TV began broadcasting on December 9, 1984. It operated from studios on Northwest 52nd Avenue in Miami Gardens, converting a former Beck's brewery. By the time it went on the air, investment had turned over: Milton Grant, a stockholder in the Shlenker Group, had become the outright owner, and WBFS-TV's sign-on heralded the start of the Grant Broadcasting System of independent stations. Unlike most stations, WBFS-TV was not heavily reliant on movies in prime time. Grant, an aggressive buyer of syndicated programming sometimes years in advance, brought this style to the Miami market. The station promoted its maximum-power signal of 5 million watts, enough to reach into West Palm Beach, with slick imaging and the slogan "Florida's Super Station". The marketing blitz for WBFS's launch was said to have cost $2 million over 60 days. The station also aired Miami Hurricanes football and men's basketball.

=== Grant bankruptcy and Combined ownership ===
The Grant Broadcasting System sold the Fort Worth and Houston stations in early 1985 and expanded to new startup independents in two larger markets, Philadelphia (WGBS-TV) and Chicago (WGBO-TV). By March 1986, WBFS had tied WCIX as the top independent station in South Florida. However, the new stations and WBFS-TV had to grapple with their high promotional expenses and rapidly rising programming costs. The other Miami stations saw Grant's strategy coming and matched his bids, blunting the impact of his spending. Equally importantly, when the television advertising market slowed down, the highly leveraged Grant-Shlenker consortium faced financial difficulties. Syndicators began to seek payment from a group that did not have the resources to pay. Programs were hastily pulled from the WBFS-TV schedule because their syndicators, such as Embassy Pictures, were threatening to pull the programs and already shopping them to channel 33's competitors.

On December 8, 1986, all three Grant television stations filed for Chapter 11 bankruptcy protection in Philadelphia. This protected them from the demands of the syndicators. WBFS-TV was the most successful of the three stations economically, though only in relative terms. Before taxes, it lost $6.54 million in 1986, compared with $9.72 million at the Philadelphia station and $13.76 million in Chicago. One syndicator even went as far as to file a competing application against WBFS-TV's license renewal, largely as a leverage maneuver in bankruptcy court.

In a March 1987 bankruptcy court proceeding in Philadelphia, Grant was allowed to continue operating its stations until at least July 1 through cash and accounts receivables to fund operations, denying a motion by the company's creditors to assume control of the stations or force their sale. However, on July 7, Grant agreed to enter into receivership and turn over control of the company and its three stations to its television program suppliers and bondholders under a reorganization plan to repay $420 million in debt from the stations' operations by 1995, at which point the stations would be sold off. The reorganization plan was formally filed on October 13 and approved on March 30, 1988. In July 1988, Combined Broadcasting, a creditor-controlled company, took over Grant and the three stations.

Despite being run by a consortium of creditors, WBFS continued to do well under Combined's stewardship. It became the over-the-air home of the expansion Miami Heat of the NBA in 1988. It added rights to 50 games from the Florida Marlins of Major League Baseball's National League and 10 road games of the Florida Panthers of the NHL in 1993.

In 1993, Combined put WBFS and WGBO up for sale, seeking $90 million for the pair. Chris-Craft Industries expressed interest in both stations, and Renaissance Communications, owner of competing independent WDZL (channel 39), also looked into a bid to combine both stations' programming, but Combined took them off the market later in the year. Combined sold WGBO to Univision in early 1994 for $30 million; not all of the Spanish-language network's programming was airing in Chicago at the time. In April 1994, Combined signed an affiliation agreement for WBFS-TV with The WB, a new television network slated to start in January 1995.

=== Sale to Paramount and affiliation with UPN ===
In October 1994, Combined reached an agreement to sell WBFS-TV and WGBS-TV to Paramount Stations Group. As a consequence, Paramount announced that the two stations would join the forthcoming United Paramount Network (UPN), which was created through a programming partnership with Chris-Craft, and that WBFS-TV and WDZL would swap proposed affiliations to leave WBFS-TV with UPN and WDZL with The WB. Even though the deal did not close for nearly a year—as it was dependent on Paramount selling another Philadelphia station, WTXF—WBFS joined the new UPN at its launch on January 16, 1995.

As UPN expanded in programming offering, the sports teams left. The Heat had returned to WBFS-TV in 1993, but they signed a deal with WAMI-TV (channel 69) in 1998. The Marlins followed suit in 1999.

WBFS-TV's UPN33 logo, used from 2002 to 2006.

In 2000, Paramount's parent company Viacom merged with CBS, making WBFS a sister station to CBS owned-and-operated station WFOR-TV. WBFS moved into WFOR-TV's facilities in Doral, and the two Miami stations and WTVX in the West Palm Beach market, which had been owned alongside WBFS by Paramount and Viacom prior to the merger, were placed under one general manager: Steve Mauldin, who had been leading WFOR-TV since 1998. However, revenue was flat to down across the three stations, and WBFS-TV's share of Miami designated market area TV revenues slipped from 8.7 to 7.3 percent between 2001 and 2006.

Since being consolidated with WFOR-TV, WBFS-TV has occasionally aired CBS network programming to accommodate the CBS station's coverage of news and weather events and Miami Dolphins preseason coverage (to which WFOR-TV holds the rights).

=== Transition to MyNetworkTV, independence and The CW ===
WBFS's first logo as a MyNetworkTV affiliate, used from 2006 to 2010.

WBFS's second logo as a MyNetworkTV affiliate, used from 2011 to 2022.

On January 24, 2006, CBS Corporation (which had been formed from the split of Viacom in two) and Time Warner's Warner Bros. Entertainment division announced that they would dissolve UPN and The WB, moving some of their programming to a newly created network, The CW. Twelve CBS-owned UPN stations were chosen as charter affiliates of The CW; WBFS-TV was not included, as the deal also included a long-term affiliation pact with 16 Tribune Broadcasting stations—including WBZL (the former WDZL, later renamed WSFL).

To serve affiliates of the two networks not selected for The CW—namely its own—News Corporation announced the creation of MyNetworkTV on February 22, 2006. After initially announcing plans that May to take WBFS-TV independent, CBS opted to affiliate three of its stations—WBFS-TV; WUPL in New Orleans, similarly situated to WBFS-TV; and WTCN-CA in the West Palm Beach market—with MyNetworkTV in July.

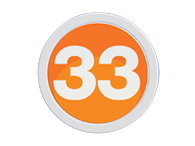
Former logo as an independent, first used from 2010 to 2011, then from 2022 to 2024.

By 2023, the station no longer aired MyNetworkTV programming, operating as an independent from that point forward. CBS later announced WBFS would join The CW on September 1, 2024, as part of a larger agreement reached with Nexstar Media Group, majority owner of the network since 2022; this also included co-owned WKBD-TV in Detroit, which had dropped CW programming one year earlier. WBFS took over from WSFL as part of another earlier move where the affiliations of Scripps-owned CW affiliates went unrenewed.

== Local programming ==
=== Newscasts ===
The first news of any kind on WBFS-TV came in the form of prime time news breaks supplied by WTVJ in 1993.

Soon after the Viacom-CBS merger in 2001, and in the wake of the September 11 attacks, WBFS began to air a nightly 10 p.m. newscast from WFOR-TV. This was the third prime time news broadcast in the market after WSVN's long-established 10 p.m. newscast and a WTVJ-produced newscast in that slot on WB affiliate WBZL. In 2003, the newscast was expanded from 30 minutes to a full hour, and the next year, WBFS added a two-hour-long extension of WFOR's weekday morning newscast, airing from 7 to 9 a.m., which replaced paid programming in that time slot and competed against WSVN's morning newscast Today in Florida. The morning newscast failed to garner viewership and aired for the last time on October 17, 2008, when WBFS-TV's weekend newscasts were also dropped and several on-air talent and six behind-the-scenes employees were dismissed as part of budget cuts. The 10 p.m. newscast ended in September 2011.

A prime time newscast, now airing at 9 p.m., was re-introduced in July 2022 using the new CBS News Now format. The Now format was discontinued in 2023; WBFS would later reintroduce a locally produced 9 p.m. newscast anchored by Jim Berry and Najahe Sherman. A morning newscast from 7 to 8 a.m. was restored in January 2024.

=== Sports programming ===
In 2020, Inter Miami CF announced that, alongside WFOR-TV, WBFS would carry regionally televised matches. (Note: All Major League Soccer local television rights agreements ended after 2022 to make way for MLS's 10-year deal with Apple.) In 2025, WBFS announced an agreement with the Miami Marlins of Major League Baseball to simulcast 15 games.

== Technical information ==
=== Subchannels ===
WBFS-TV's transmitter is located in Andover, Florida. The station's signal is multiplexed:

Subchannels of WBFS-TV
Subchannel	Res.	Short name	Programming
33.1	1080i	WBFS-TV	The CW
33.2	480i	WBFSTV2	Movies!
33.3	480i	WBFSTV3	Charge!
33.4	480i	WBFSTV4	Comet
33.5	480i	WBFSTV5	Story Television
33.6	480i	WBFSTV6	Roar
33.7	480i	WBFSTV7	MeTV Toons

=== Analog-to-digital conversion ===
WBFS-TV ended programming on its analog signal, on UHF channel 33, on June 12, 2009, the official date on which full-power television stations in the United States transitioned from analog to digital broadcasts under federal mandate. The station's digital signal continued to broadcast on its pre-transition UHF channel 32, using virtual channel 33.
