= Channel 15 branded TV stations in the United States =

The following television stations in the United States brand as channel 15 (though neither using virtual channel 15 nor broadcasting on physical RF channel 15):

- WCWN in Schenectady, New York
- WTCN-CD in Palm Beach, Florida
