= WIRK-TV =

Television station in West Palm Beach, Florida (1953–1956)

- West Palm Beach, Florida; United States
- Channels: Analog: 21 (UHF)

Programming
- Affiliations: CBS (1953–1954); NBC (1953–1954); ABC (1953–1955); Independent (1955–1956)

Ownership
- Owner: WIRK-TV, Inc.

History
- First air date: September 13, 1953
- Last air date: February 29, 1956

Technical information
- ERP: 18.6 kW
- HAAT: 220 ft (67 m)
- Transmitter coordinates: 26°42′43.4″N 80°3′6.1″W

WIRK-TV (channel 21) was a television station licensed to West Palm Beach, Florida, United States. It was the first television station in the Palm Beach area, signing on September 13, 1953. However, it was quickly overshadowed by new VHF stations, which took away its network affiliations, and ceased telecasting February 29, 1956.

== Foundation and construction ==
The owners of WIRK radio (1290 AM), organized as WIRK-TV, Inc., filed with the Federal Communications Commission (FCC) to build a new television station in West Palm Beach—on channel 12—on May 21, 1952. However, as two other applicants also pursued the channel, WIRK-TV opted to amend its application in November to specify UHF channel 21, also allocated to West Palm Beach, instead, and thus get a head start on the VHF stations whose fates would be determined by lengthy comparative hearings. The change allowed WIRK-TV to get its construction permit on December 18, 1952—the first such permit in West Palm Beach.

While WIRK originally planned to house the television station at an expansion of its Phillips Point facility, channel 21 instead took up residence on the 12th floor of the Harvey Building downtown in a 10-year lease agreement. However, channel 21's film department was in the Remington Rand Building, one floor below the WIRK radio studios. That summer, construction began for the new WIRK-TV studios and a maximum-height tower topping the Harvey Building. Though West Palm Beach was already served by coaxial network lines, the new station would not be interconnected immediately because of the time needed for the telephone company to make the connection.

== Sign-on and operations ==
WIRK-TV secured affiliations with CBS, NBC and ABC, and channel 21 began transmitting a test pattern at the end of August after the transmitter was hoisted atop the Harvey Building on August 25. The station formally opened on September 13, 1953, airing network fare as well as a range of local shows. Some features on WIRK-TV came from personalities on the radio side. Rome Hartman, who was known for his sports commentary on WIRK radio, brought his Sportscope show to television. Country music DJ Johnny Wooten, "the Yardbird", also appeared on TV, and the radio station's continuity director doubled as the WIRK-TV weatherman. WIRK became an interconnected network affiliate on November 25.

== Lost affiliations and closure ==
In summer 1954, CBS pulled its affiliation from WIRK-TV after its Miami affiliate, WTVJ, installed a stronger antenna giving it improved coverage in the Palm Beach areas. Mid-1954 also saw the station be sued by film distributor Unity TV Corp. for refusing to pay rental on movies it had acquired to air. But the biggest threat to channel 21, in spite of a high UHF conversion rate, was the signing on of the VHF stations in West Palm, channels 5 and 12. When they came to air in 1954 and 1955, respectively, WJNO-TV and WEAT-TV took the NBC and ABC affiliations from WIRK-TV, leaving the UHF station without a network hookup and at a decided disadvantage to its newer competitors. Of WIRK-TV as an independent, Hartman remarked, "We were strictly local programming and old films." The local shows also included a teen dance program and an in-studio auction.

WIRK-TV then set out to try to challenge its VHF competitors on legal grounds. In 1955, it contested the sale of WEAT-AM-TV to General Teleradio, hoping to have the FCC set it aside, but the commission found that WIRK lacked standing to do so and also dismissed WIRK's application on the merits. On February 29, 1956, WIRK-TV ceased operations. In a statement, Joseph S. Field, president of WIRK-TV, Inc., attacked the FCC for its inattention to the problems of small and UHF stations like channel 21, noting that the company "had operated this station long past the point of good judgment" hoping for a remedy but not finding one, blaming "big business and powerful network influence" for the status quo that had ultimately claimed the venture. Field had further words for the chairman of the FCC, sarcastically congratulating him on "eliminat[ing] another small potato in this era of big business" and suggesting that the FCC change its name to the "Federal Communications Protective League". One of the partners in WIRK, disenchanted after the TV station's failure, then sold his stake in the radio station to Hartman. The license, still in force, was canceled on December 21.
