= WWHB-CD =

Television station in Stuart, Florida

ATSC 3.0 station
- Stuart–West Palm Beach, Florida; United States
- City: Stuart, Florida
- Channels: Digital: 33 (UHF); Virtual: 48

Programming
- Affiliations: 48.1: Roar; for others, see § Subchannels

Ownership
- Owner: Sinclair Broadcast Group; (WTVX Licensee, LLC)
- Sister stations: WPEC; WTVX; WTCN-CD

History
- Founded: March 8, 1984
- First air date: January 11, 1991
- Former call signs: W16AR (1990–1995); WTCN-LP (1995–2001); WTCN-CA (2001–2003); WWHB-CA (2003–2019)
- Former channel numbers: Analog: 16 (UHF, 1991–2001), 15 (UHF, 2001–2002), 14 (UHF, 2002–2003), 48 (UHF, 2003–2012); Digital: 48 (UHF, 2012–2019)
- Former affiliations: Independent (1991–1999); The WB (1999–2002); Azteca América (2002–2022)
- Call sign meaning: Named for former owner William H. Block

Technical information
- Licensing authority: FCC
- Facility ID: 63557
- Class: CD
- ERP: 15 kW
- HAAT: 292.5 m (960 ft)
- Transmitter coordinates: 27°1′32″N 80°10′41.9″W

Links
- Public license information: Public file; LMS

WWHB-CD (channel 48) is a low-power, Class A television station licensed to Stuart, Florida, United States, serving as the West Palm Beach area's outlet for the digital multicast network Roar. It is owned by Sinclair Broadcast Group alongside CBS affiliate WPEC (channel 12), CW affiliate WTVX (channel 34), and WTCN-CD (channel 43), an independent station with MyNetworkTV. The stations share studios on Fairfield Drive in Mangonia Park; WWHB-CD's transmitter is located southwest of Hobe Sound, Florida.

WWHB-CD is the ATSC 3.0 (Next Gen TV) transmitter for West Palm Beach, hosting its main subchannel and the four major network stations. In exchange, its subchannels are broadcast on four full-power stations in the market.

== History ==
WWHB began broadcasting on January 11, 1991, as an independent station with the call sign W16AR. It was located on UHF channel 16 and was licensed to Stuart. Retired businessman August Gabriel began the station with $200,000 and three employees. It changed its call sign to WTCN-LP in 1995. From October 1996 until February 1997, it briefly produced a local morning show known as Good Morning Treasure Coast that was hosted by Tom Teter. Ed Birchfield also briefly hosted a 7 p.m. Treasure Coast News program from February to July 1997.

The station moved to UHF channel 15 in 2001 (when it converted to Class A and changed its calls to WTCN-CA in February of that year) and then to UHF channel 14 in 2002. It added a translator on UHF channel 53 in order to reach West Palm Beach. On January 15, 2003, the station changed its calls to the current WWHB-CA and switched to UHF channel 48. This aired from a transmitter at the western boundary of Johnathan Dickinson State Park in Martin County southwest of Jupiter Island.

Martin County businessman Bill Brothers purchased the station in 2001. It was Brothers who revitalized the station creating the first Hispanic language local television service for the West Palm Beach market. Rebuilding the broadcasting facilities together with his sister station WTCN, WWHB served the Treasure Coast's rapidly growing Hispanic population. In 2005, Viacom bought WWHB and sister station WTCN (channel 43) from Brothers for $7.7 million. Viacom moved the studios back to West Palm Beach and improved the station's signal.

On February 7, 2007, CBS agreed to sell seven of its smaller-market stations to Cerberus Capital Management, L.P., for $185 million. Cerberus then formed a new holding company for the stations, Four Points Media Group, which took over the operation of the stations through local marketing agreements in late-June 2007. The deal closed on January 10, 2008. Although the URL for the WWHB website has not changed since the sale to Four Points, it now redirects to a separate section of WTVX's website. As of February 25, 2008, the station is now being operated out of Four Points' hub station KUTV in Salt Lake City, Utah.

On September 8, 2011, Sinclair Broadcast Group announced its intent to purchase Four Points from Cerberus Capital Management for $200 million; Sinclair began managing the stations, including WWHB-CA, under local marketing agreements following antitrust approval. The deal with Sinclair acquiring Four Points was completed on January 3, 2012.

On January 1, 2023, WWHB-CD switched to TBD programming after Azteca América ceased operations, sharing the affiliation with WTCN-CD's third digital subchannel.

== Subchannels ==
Subchannels provided by WWHB-CD (ATSC 1.0)
Subchannel	Res.	Short name	Programming	ATSC 1.0 host
48.1	480i	ROAR	Roar	WTVX
48.2	480i	Charge!	Charge!	WPTV-TV
48.3	480i	Stadium	The Nest	WFLX
48.4	480i	Rewind	Rewind TV	WPBF

Subchannels of WWHB-CD (ATSC 3.0)
Subchannel	Res.	Short name	Programming
5.1	1080p	WPTV	NBC (WPTV-TV)
12.1	1080p	WPEC	CBS (WPEC)
12.10	1080p	T2	T2 (from Tennis Channel)
12.11	1080p	PBTV	Pickleballtv
12.20		GMLOOP	GameLoop
25.1	1080p	WPBF	ABC (WPBF)
29.1	720p	WFLX	Fox (WFLX)
48.1	1080p	WWHB-CD	Roar

Subchannel broadcast with digital rights management
Subchannel streamed via the Internet
