= WFLX =

Television station in West Palm Beach, Florida

- West Palm Beach, Florida; United States
- Channels: Digital: 35 (UHF); Virtual: 29
- Branding: Fox 29

Programming
- Affiliations: 29.1: Fox; for others, see § Subchannels

Ownership
- Owner: Gray Media; (Gray Television Licensee, LLC)
- Operator: E. W. Scripps Company
- Sister stations: WPTV-TV, WHDT

History
- First air date: October 1, 1982
- Former channel numbers: Analog: 29 (UHF, 1982–2009); Digital: 28 (UHF, 2002–2019)
- Former affiliations: Independent (1982–1986)
- Call sign meaning: "Flix", reference to the station's original movie-intensive lineup

Technical information
- Licensing authority: FCC
- Facility ID: 39736
- ERP: 800 kW
- HAAT: 452 m (1,483 ft)
- Transmitter coordinates: 26°34′30.7″N 80°14′31.1″W

Links
- Public license information: Public file; LMS
- Website: www.wflx.com

WFLX (channel 29) is a television station in West Palm Beach, Florida, United States, affiliated with the Fox network. It is owned by Gray Media and operated by the E. W. Scripps Company alongside NBC affiliate WPTV-TV (channel 5) and Stuart-licensed independent station WHDT (channel 9). The stations share studios on Banyan Boulevard in downtown West Palm Beach; WFLX's transmitter is located near Wellington west of US 441/SR 7.

== History ==
WFLX's signature logo, used from 1995 until 2008.

WFLX was to begin operations in August 1982 but delays pushed the sign-on date back to October 1, 1982, as an independent station, the market's first. Originally owned by Malrite Communications, it ran a programming lineup typical of independent stations at the time—early-morning cartoons, older sitcoms later in mornings, movies in early afternoons/prime time (hence the slogan "South Florida's Free Movie Station"), classic sitcoms in the late-afternoon, and current sitcoms during early/late-evenings. WFLX originally operated from studios located on West Blue Heron Boulevard/SR 708 in Riviera Beach. Unlike most independents, the amount of children's programming seen on WFLX during this time was low compared to similar stations in other markets, a trend owing to the older demographics of the West Palm Beach area; instead, the station focused on its movies, owning a library of 3,600 titles by 1984. The station was an aggressive promoter, using a red macaw named Firecracker as its mascot in station advertisements and events, playing movie requests from viewers and counterprogramming West Palm Beach's three network-affiliated stations.

One of WFLX's original programs was Bedtime Movies, which aired late on Saturday night. Although rarely making a dent in the ratings against NBC's Saturday Night Live, the show gained a loyal cult following thanks to its rotating group of hosts: attractive young women, who would announce the films while lying on a queen sized bed, wearing a lace teddy. The "Bedtime Movie Girls" (as well as a few male hosts) were also sent out on station promotions, at county fairs, jai alai matches and even tractor pulls. Bedtime Movies was cancelled at the end of 1987, but was brought back briefly in the late 1990s.

On October 9, 1986, WFLX became one of the charter affiliates of Fox. At the time, it was the de facto affiliate of the network in all of South Florida, since WCIX, the Fox affiliate in Miami (now CBS O&O WFOR-TV), had a signal unable to reach most Broward and northern Miami-Dade county viewers, an issue eventually rectified on January 1, 1989, when a number of affiliation swaps in Miami and West Palm Beach resulted in Miami's WSVN becoming Miami's Fox affiliate. WPTV and WFLX would be the only two West Palm Beach stations unaffected by any of the affiliation shuffles.

As the 1990s approached, WFLX picked up Fox Kids programming in afternoons and phased out older sitcoms for talk and reality shows. After the 1993–1994 season, it was recognized as the "Fox Affiliate of the Year". In 1998, Malrite was purchased by Raycom Media. Shortly after the merger, ratings came out affirming that WFLX was one of Fox's highest affiliates in terms of network ratings, including bleed-over numbers into Miami/Fort Lauderdale to the south. In April 2002, WFLX was the first station in the West Palm Beach market to broadcast in high definition, carrying network programming in the format.

In April 2005, Raycom tested The Tube Music Network, one of the first digital subchannel networks, on this station for three weeks. Raycom then announced on April 25, 2005, that it would be the launch station group for The Tube affiliating 29 stations. On October 1, 2007, The Tube ceased operations due to financial issues.

WFLX's former logo, used from 2008 until 2026.

WFLX discontinued regular programming on its analog signal, over UHF channel 29, at noon on June 12, 2009, the official date on which full-power television stations in the United States transitioned from analog to digital broadcasts under federal mandate. The station's digital signal remained on its pre-transition UHF channel 28, using virtual channel 29.

In March 2011, Raycom announced that WFLX would be operated through a shared services agreement with WPTV-TV, the NBC affiliate for the Treasure Coast owned and operated by E. W. Scripps Company. In addition to news content, which WPTV had produced for WFLX since the beginning of 2011, WPTV would handle technical, promotional, and online operations for WFLX, along with possible production of local content outside of news. The stations would have separate sales departments; WFLX's sales team (which remained separate from WPTV) would lease space at WPTV's studios on South Australian Avenue in downtown West Palm Beach. It was later announced that WFLX would vacate their existing studio in Riviera Beach at the end of May.

== Programming ==
WFLX frequently broadcasts New York Giants games due to a large number of transplants from the New York area. The only exception is when the Miami Dolphins are on Fox at the same time (which only occurred when the Dolphins played host to an NFC team prior to the introduction of cross flexing procedures in 2014; most Dolphins games still air on WPEC due to CBS' contract with the AFC).

=== News operation ===
WFLX presently broadcasts 17 hours of locally produced newscasts each week (with three hours each weekday and one hour each on Saturdays and Sundays).

==== News share with WPEC ====
After Fox required most of its affiliates to air newscasts in 1990, WFLX entered in a news share agreement with CBS affiliate WPEC (then owned by the Photo Electronics Corporation). On September 11, 1991, that station started producing a nightly prime time broadcast at 10 p.m. on WFLX known as The Fox 29 10 O'Clock News. Originally thirty minutes long, it soon expanded to a full hour. In 2000, an hour-long weekday morning show at 7 a.m. began to air entitled Fox 29 Morning News; this was expanded to two hours on September 6, 2006.

WFLX and WPEC maintained separate news sets and on-air identities but shared a weather set and most on-air personnel, except for a few that only appeared on one station. While produced by WPEC, the broadcasts maintained their own separate identity and look, similar to other Raycom stations. As with network programming, the newscasts also rated in the Miami–Fort Lauderdale market, a trend some have attributed to backlash to that area's Fox affiliate WSVN. As a result, Adelphia (whose system was later acquired by Comcast) pulled WSVN off its West Palm Beach cable lineup in 2005. On January 31, 2008, WPEC and WFLX became the second and third stations respectively in all of South Florida to offer newscasts in high definition behind NBC affiliate WPTV.

WFLX was the first station in the West Palm Beach market to air a prime time newscast at 10 p.m., and compete with CW affiliate WTVX, which aired their own 10 p.m. newscast (produced at the studios of its Salt Lake City sister station, KUTV, and including two locally based reporters) from August 4, 2008, until it was moved to 6:30 p.m. on March 2, 2009 (and was discontinued altogether three months later). Five years later, WPEC began airing a weeknight-only 10 p.m. newscast for that station.

==== Partnership with WPTV ====
It was announced on October 22, 2010, that the agreement with WPEC would end on December 31, 2010. On January 1, 2011, WPTV established a new partnership with WFLX and began producing the two-hour weekday morning show and nightly hour-long prime time newscast. These newscasts originated from a secondary set at WPTV's facilities on South Australian Avenue in downtown West Palm Beach (its mailing address actually says Banyan Boulevard, which is also known as 1st Street) and required the addition of more than a dozen new personnel. The new news agreement eventually led to WFLX's shared services agreement with WPTV later in 2011.

WPTV's agreement marked the first time that a Scripps station produced such a newscast since a now-defunct arrangement between WXYZ-TV and WKBD-TV (which was then a UPN affiliate) in Detroit. An entirely new format was introduced and the coverage was different. On Friday and Sunday nights at 10:45, there was a fifteen-minute sports highlight show called The Wayne Akers Ford Sports Zone (named after a local dealership). On September 19, 2011, WPTV added a half-hour weekday late afternoon newscast to WFLX known as Fox 29 News First at 4. With this addition, there was now 57 hours of local news each week provided by the two stations. This addition made it the third Fox affiliate to air a newscast produced by another station in the same market to carry a late afternoon or early evening newscast, along with WSYM-TV in Lansing, Michigan, and WQRF in Rockford, Illinois. Fox 29 News - First at 4 was canceled in the fall of 2014 as WPTV shifted production of the half-hour from WFLX to WPTV and the newscast (now an hour-long) became The Now South Florida, as all Scripps stations adapted The Now branding for their 4 p.m. newscasts.

== Subchannels ==
The station's signal is multiplexed:

Subchannels of WFLX
Subchannel	Res.	Short name	Programming
29.1	720p	Fox	Fox
29.2	480i	Bounce	Bounce TV
29.3	480i	HEROES	Heroes & Icons
29.4	480i	OxygnTC	Oxygen
29.5	480i	StartTV	Start TV
29.6	480i	Quest	Quest
29.7	480i	WFLXOUT	Outlaw
48.3	480i	Stadium	The Nest (WWHB-CD)

Broadcast on behalf of another station

Until the network's shutdown on October 1, 2007, WFLX offered The Tube Music Network on its second digital subchannel and Comcast digital channel 220. From there on until fall 2011, WFLX-DT2 remained unoccupied but showed a simple station identification and the current time of day. On September 26, 2011, WFLX relaunched subchannel 29.2 with Bounce TV.
