= WPEC =

Television station in West Palm Beach, Florida

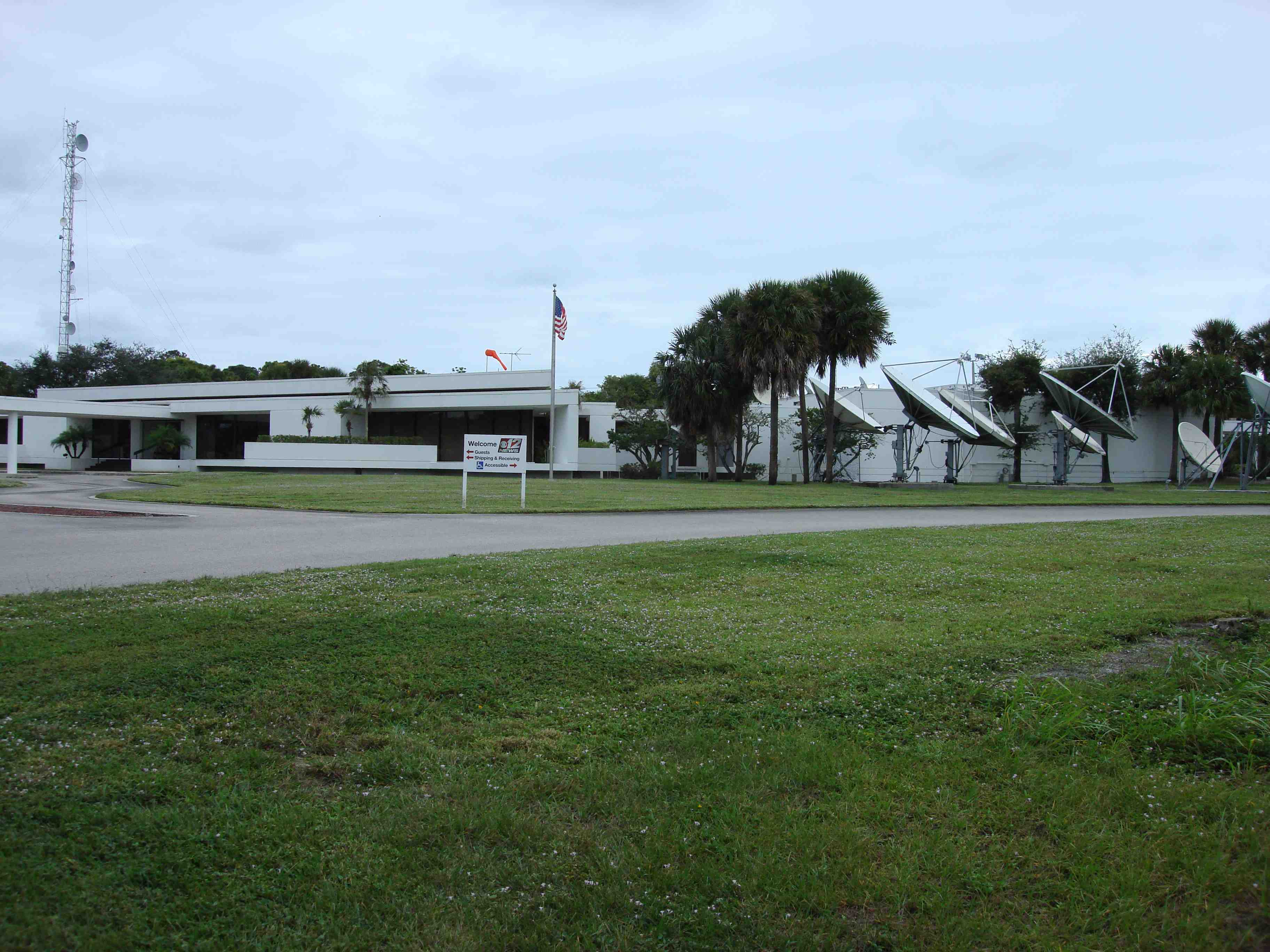
- The WPEC studios in Mangonia Park
- West Palm Beach, Florida; United States
- Channels: Digital: 13 (VHF); Virtual: 12
- Branding: CBS 12

Programming
- Affiliations: 12.1: CBS; for others, see § Subchannels

Ownership
- Owner: Sinclair Broadcast Group; (WPEC Licensee, LLC)
- Sister stations: WTVX; WTCN-CD; WWHB-CD

History
- First air date: January 1, 1955
- Former call signs: WEAT-TV (1955–1974)
- Former channel numbers: Analog: 12 (VHF, 1955–2009)
- Former affiliations: ABC (1955–1989)
- Call sign meaning: "Photo Electronics Corporation"

Technical information
- Licensing authority: FCC
- Facility ID: 52527
- ERP: 160 kW
- HAAT: 309 m (1,014 ft)
- Transmitter coordinates: 26°35′19.7″N 80°12′28.7″W

Links
- Public license information: Public file; LMS
- Website: cbs12.com

WPEC (channel 12) is a television station in West Palm Beach, Florida, United States, affiliated with CBS. It is owned by Sinclair Broadcast Group alongside CW affiliate WTVX (channel 34) and two low-power, Class A stations: WTCN-CD (channel 43) and WWHB-CD (channel 48). The stations share studios on Fairfield Drive in Mangonia Park; WPEC's transmitter is located southeast of Wellington, Florida.

The third TV station built in West Palm Beach and second-oldest in operation, channel 12 began as WEAT-TV on January 1, 1955. It was the ABC affiliate under several owners, including RKO General and land developer John D. MacArthur. In 1974, the station was acquired by Photo Electronics Corporation, headed by Alexander W. Dreyfoos, Jr. The station adopted its current call sign and expanded its news operation, but it continued to remain locked in second place in local news ratings behind NBC affiliate WPTV.

In order to compensate for an affiliation switch in Miami that would leave CBS with a coverage shortfall in Broward County, south of the market but within WPEC's signal area, CBS induced WPEC to switch from ABC to CBS in January 1989. While Broward viewers turned to WPEC for CBS programming for a time, the station failed to woo them for news viewership. Dreyfoos sold WPEC in 1995 to Freedom Communications; it became the company's flagship television property. Freedom sold its stations to Sinclair in 2011; Sinclair simultaneously acquired WTVX and the two low-power stations from Four Points Media Group. Under Sinclair's ownership, the station has slipped from second to third in news ratings.

== History ==
=== WEAT-TV ===
In April 1952, the Federal Communications Commission (FCC) opened to new television station applications after a four-year freeze, with channels 5 and 12 available in West Palm Beach. Applications for channel 12 were taken from radio station WIRK (which later amended its application for channel 21 and ultimately operated WIRK-TV for two and a half years), Television Theater of the Palm Beaches, radio station WWPG (Palm Beach Broadcasting), and—in November 1953—WEAT-TV, Inc. This company was associated with radio station WEAT (1490 AM, moved to 850 in 1954), though it did not actually own the station at the time.

The other two applicants each withdrew after WEAT-TV filed, leaving the path clear for WEAT-TV to obtain the channel 12 construction permit. The transmitter site on Congress Avenue was shared with WEAT, which was relocating from 1490 to 850 kHz; one of the three towers in the AM station's array would also hold the antenna for the TV station. While WEAT radio was affiliated with NBC, WEAT-TV would be a primary affiliate of ABC.

WEAT-TV began broadcasting on January 1, 1955. It was the second VHF station on the air in West Palm Beach after WJNO-TV (channel 5, known as WPTV after 1956), an NBC affiliate which started in August 1954. (Note: WEAT-TV was the third station on the air in West Palm Beach, as both WEAT-TV and WJNO-TV were predated by UHF station WIRK-TV, on air between September 1953 and February 1956.)

Six months after signing on, the sale of WEAT radio and television to General Teleradio, later reorganized as RKO General, was announced. RKO owned the stations for less than two years before selling them to Rex Rand and Bertram Lebhar Jr., incorporated as Palm Beach Broadcasting, in 1957.

In 1963, Rand and Lebhar sued John D. MacArthur, claiming the businessman and developer had failed to pursue a stock and loan agreement. However, by September, negotiations were ongoing on an outright sale of the station to MacArthur. The $2.1 million purchase (through Gardens Broadcasting) was confirmed that October, with MacArthur also announcing plans to establish new studios to a site in Palm Beach Gardens. Under MacArthur, WEAT-TV began broadcasting local and network programs in color. In the 1967–68 season, ABC aired a national game show, Treasure Isle, which originated from MacArthur's Colonnades Beach Hotel in Palm Beach Shores and once was aired by channel 12 in the 7 p.m. time slot. MacArthur also expressed interest in teaming with Lamar Hunt to acquire the ABC network in 1968, having previously purchased video equipment from the failed Overmyer Network.

=== WPEC ===
MacArthur, then 76, announced in April 1973 that he would begin selling off his vast business holdings in Palm Beach County. The first business to be sold was WEAT-TV; the buyer was Photo Electronics Corporation (PEC), a company founded by local entrepreneur Alexander W. Dreyfoos, Jr. and business partner George W. Mergens. Dreyfoos later noted in a 1982 interview for the Palm Beach Daily News that he was attracted to the electronic side of television. It was in technology that PEC had made its money; in 1971, the company had received an Academy Award for technical achievement for its Video Color Negative Analyzer (VCNA), a tool used in photography. The VCNA's success provided the funding to acquire WEAT-TV.

PEC assumed operation of the station on December 1; the station moved to its present studio facilities on Fairfield Drive in Mangonia Park and changed its call sign to WPEC on January 27, 1974. The untangling of WEAT radio with the television station required hiring a mostly new news staff.

Dreyfoos, who had been a hands-off manager in large part because he was actively developing a color laser printer, took active control of WPEC in late 1980, dismissing top-level management and installing his own; Bob Wiegand, the general manager of WKRC-TV in Cincinnati, was attracted to West Palm Beach by Dreyfoos's openness to remaking the station. The studio facilities were expanded, providing dedicated space for the station, which had initially been squeezed into PEC's existing footprint. Mergens died from injuries sustained in a bicycle accident in July 1986.

=== Affiliation switch to CBS ===
On August 6, 1988, WPEC announced that it would become an affiliate of CBS in January 1989, leaving ABC after 34 years. CBS had convinced WPEC to join the network as part of a deal it was making in the Miami market. Simultaneous with the affiliation news, CBS purchased WCIX (channel 6) from TVX Broadcast Group to become the new CBS affiliate in the Miami market, replacing WTVJ (channel 4). CBS had been represented in the market by WTVX (channel 34), a station licensed to and based in Fort Pierce that had only begun serving Palm Beach County in 1980. For technical reasons, WCIX's transmitter site was much further south than other major television stations in the Miami market and consequently provided little to no signal over most of Broward County, an area outside the West Palm Beach market but covered by the signals of WPEC and WPTV.

The switch to CBS excited Dreyfoos, who was running the station as acting general manager after Wiegand resigned; it came at a time when WPEC's news ratings were sliding because of an unpopular change in anchors and would allow WPEC to get out of the shadow of Miami ABC affiliate WPLG. CBS reportedly paid $5 million over two years to the station, consisting of an increase in network compensation payments; $1 million in capital improvements to the transmitter; and promotion expenses. The switch also put ABC in the position of needing a new affiliate in West Palm Beach. In a move that stunned local broadcasters, it bypassed outgoing CBS affiliate WTVX (and Fox affiliate WFLX) and chose to affiliate with WPBF (channel 25), a station not even on the air, based on its more central location; the track record of one of its owners with another station; and its willingness to pay the first-ever reverse compensation affiliation fee to the network.

After the switch, Broward viewers made up a much larger portion of WPEC's audience. In 1988, seven percent of channel 12 viewers in total-day ratings and six percent in afternoon and prime time came from Broward. In February 1989, however, those figures surged to 24 percent, 29 percent, and 32 percent, respectively. WPEC courted Broward viewers with enhanced news coverage and special antenna deals. However, the station found that residents of these areas watched primarily for network programs and turned to Miami stations for their local news. In a second switch in 1995, CBS returned to the channel 4 facility; instead, NBC moved to channel 6.

=== Freedom Communications ownership ===
Dreyfoos was interested in acquiring additional TV stations, but after valuations rose in the industry and a surge in unsolicited offers for WPEC in the first half of 1995, he put the station on the market. For many years, Dreyfoos had received expressions of interest in the station from a variety of suitors, including Generoso Pope Jr., founder of the National Enquirer. He believed that WPEC would be better served in a consolidated media environment being part of a larger station group.

For more than $150 million—including interest, approaching $160 million—Freedom Communications was the winning bidder for WPEC in September 1995. It was the largest transaction in the company's history and made WPEC its flagship television property. Freedom's bid beat out larger suitors such as Meredith Corporation, Clear Channel Communications, The New York Times Company, and Tribune Company, many of whom were surprised at the final sale price; Dreyfoos benefited from a growing frenzy of consolidation and large media purchases during the time the station was on the market, and in the long term, the station had appreciated in value because of extensive population growth in the West Palm Beach market. In the purchase, Freedom acquired the buildings belonging to WPEC and Photo Electronics Corporation itself; the company's remaining business was moving to Seattle. The rise in the station's valuation was a surprise. The Mergens family sued Dreyfoos after the sale, claiming that he had purposefully understated the company's value when he purchased their 38 percent stake in the station in 1994 at a valuation of $38 million.

=== Sinclair ownership ===
Freedom announced on November 2, 2011, that it would bow out of television and sell its stations, including WPEC, to the Sinclair Broadcast Group. Sinclair had earlier announced the acquisition of Four Points Media Group, owner of WTVX as well as low-power stations WTCN-CA and WWHB-CA, and the two purchases resulted in the first full duopoly in West Palm Beach.

WPEC housed the studios for the American Sports Network, a Sinclair-run sports channel and syndication service that operated from 2014 to 2017. News programs for Sinclair-managed WGFL in Gainesville, were presented from the WPEC facilities until their discontinuation on May 12, 2023. In 2022, WPEC hosted a gubernatorial debate, held at the Sunrise Theater in Fort Pierce, between Ron DeSantis and Charlie Crist.

== News operation ==
Channel 12 only aired a half-hour evening newscast until becoming WPEC; one of Dreyfoos's first programming moves was to extend the station's evening news to a full hour. However, the station was behind WPTV and even Miami's WTVJ locally; MacArthur's general disinvestment in news gave WPTV a significant head start in news coverage. After Dreyfoos took a more active hand in managing WPEC in 1981, the station opted for a younger look in news, replacing well-liked anchorwoman Eleanor Schano White with the duo of John Matthews and Laurel Sauer. Reg Miller, who replaced Matthews, and Sauer remained the lead anchors at channel 12 until 1988, when management decided to fire Miller and move Sauer to weekends and replace them with the younger Steve Wolford and Jacquie Bange. This was met with pickets and a precipitous ratings decline, leading to Bange's demotion after eight months.

To prepare for the 1989 affiliation switch and to lure viewers in Broward County, the station reinforced its news presence in the southern part of its market and beyond, bolstering an existing news bureau in Boca Raton and adding one in Fort Lauderdale. A full-time staff of five people was devoted to covering news from Broward. While the station improved its ratings overall, it still found itself in its traditional second-place position behind WPTV. With WTVX's news department going under, WPEC also established a news bureau in Stuart, covering the Treasure Coast. After two years, the station abandoned its Broward news quest; it found that the viewers turning to channel 12 for network programs were watching other Miami stations for their local news.

From 1991 to 2010, WPEC produced news programs for Fox affiliate WFLX, beginning with the debut of a 10 p.m. news hour in September 1991. This was the first early late local news in the market since WTVX had briefly aired one in early 1989, after losing CBS but before closing its newsroom. The idea had originated the year before when, at a party, WPEC's general manager told his WFLX counterpart in jest, "I hear you're going into the news business. Why don't you call us, we'll do it for you." The move gave WFLX a newscast, at a time when Fox was encouraging its affiliates to add local news, and allowed WPEC to spread the costs of its news operation across more programming. The program had dedicated anchors but shared most on-air personnel; WPEC received an annual licensing fee and revenue sharing when advertising revenues exceeded a certain amount. In May 2000, the partnership was expanded with an hour-long 7 a.m. newscast, the Fox Morning News, which filled the void created when WPEC had to drop the 7 a.m. hour of its news to air The Early Show. An 8 a.m. hour of the program was introduced in 2006. The deal was unwound at the end of 2010, when WPTV began producing WFLX's news with programs in the same time slots.

The market's news ratings race tightened in the 2000s, when WPBF—which had been the third-place station since its 1989 debut—improved its product as WPEC narrowed the gap with WPTV. However, by 2014, the station's position had diminished to a close third behind WPBF in West Palm Beach–market news ratings and a more distant third in market revenue.

On March 3, 2014, WPEC replaced its 7 p.m. newscast with a new 10 p.m. newscast on WTVX, which was later discontinued. That year, WPEC itself debuted the market's first 3 p.m. newscast, aimed at a female audience and featuring three women as anchors. A 9 a.m. newscast began airing in 2016.

=== Notable former on-air staff ===
- Donna Deegan, anchor, 1980s (known as Donna Clewis while at WPEC)
- Suzy Kolber, reporter and weekend anchor, 1991–1993
- Alison Kosik, reporter
- Al Terzi, anchor, 1978–1980
- Gary Tuchman, reporter, 1985–1990

== Technical information ==
=== Subchannels ===
WPEC's transmitter is located southeast of Wellington, Florida. The station's signal is multiplexed:

Subchannels of WPEC
Subchannel	Res.	Short name	Programming
12.1	1080i	CBS	CBS
12.2	480i	Charge!	Charge!
12.3	480i	Comet	Comet
12.4	480i	TheNest	The Nest

=== Analog-to-digital conversion ===
WPEC ended regular programming on its analog signal, over VHF channel 12, on June 9, 2009 (three days before the most full-power television stations in the United States transitioned from analog to digital broadcasts under federal mandate on June 12). The station's digital signal remained on its pre-transition VHF channel 13, using virtual channel 12.
