= WPTV-TV =

Television station in West Palm Beach, Florida

- West Palm Beach, Florida; United States
- Channels: Digital: 12 (VHF); Virtual: 5
- Branding: WPTV

Programming
- Affiliations: 5.1: NBC; for others, see § Subchannels

Ownership
- Owner: E. W. Scripps Company; (Scripps Broadcasting Holdings LLC)
- Sister stations: WFLX, WHDT

History
- First air date: August 22, 1954
- Former call signs: WJNO-TV (1954–1956); WPTV (1956–2010)
- Former channel numbers: Analog: 5 (VHF, 1954–2009); Digital: 55 (UHF, 2003–2009)
- Call sign meaning: West Palm Television

Technical information
- Licensing authority: FCC
- Facility ID: 59443
- ERP: 50 kW
- HAAT: 386.3 m (1,267 ft)
- Transmitter coordinates: 26°35′21.2″N 80°12′42.8″W
- Repeater: WHDT 5.11 Stuart

Links
- Public license information: Public file; LMS
- Website: www.wptv.com

WPTV-TV (channel 5) is a television station in West Palm Beach, Florida, United States, affiliated with NBC. It is owned by the E. W. Scripps Company alongside WHDT (channel 9), an independent station licensed to Stuart, and operated with Gray Media–owned Fox affiliate WFLX (channel 29). The stations share studios on Banyan Boulevard in downtown West Palm Beach; WPTV-TV's transmitter is located along US 441 southwest of West Palm Beach.

Channel 5 began broadcasting as WJNO-TV on August 22, 1954. It broadcast from a former greenhouse in Palm Beach and was the first VHF television station in the area. The station was sold to John Phipps in 1956, becoming WPTV, and to Scripps in 1961. It moved its studios to West Palm Beach in 1971, relocating to its present site in 2001. An NBC affiliate from the outset, WPTV has spent much of its history as the news ratings leader in the market, though in the 2020s, WPBF has challenged it and surpassed it in some time periods.

== History ==
=== Construction and early years ===
In 1952, channel 5 was allocated to West Palm Beach by the Federal Communications Commission (FCC). Two groups applied. One was WJNO (1230 AM), a West Palm Beach radio station that had been waiting for the FCC to lift its multi-year freeze on new television station licenses to make an application. The other was Palm Beach Television, a consortium that counted Theodore Granik—creator of The American Forum of the Air—among its stockholders. On November 4, 1953, the two groups combined their bids, ending the contest and receiving a construction permit. As part of the merger, Palm Beach Television changed its name to WJNO-TV, Inc., and joined forces with WJNO radio (still under partially separate ownership) to put the new station on the air.

WJNO-TV began broadcasting on August 22, 1954. Frank Folsom, president of the Radio Corporation of America, put the station formally on air and launched a two-hour dedication that included appearances from stars Dorothy Sarnoff, Vaughn Monroe, Eddy Arnold, Lou Monte, and Paul Gilbert. It was an affiliate of NBC. Its studio was in Palm Beach at the Palm Beach Playhouse. The studio had previously functioned as the greenhouse of the Royal Poinciana Hotel. WJNO-TV was the first VHF television station in the city, which already had a UHF outlet: WIRK-TV on channel 21, which started in September 1953. WTVJ in Miami, whose signal also covered the Palm Beaches, dropped its remaining NBC programming a month later. West Palm Beach gained a second VHF station, WEAT-TV (channel 12, now WPEC), in 1955; it was an ABC affiliate. WIRK-TV folded in 1956. Channel 5 aired some CBS programs.

In 1956, WJNO-TV, Inc. sold the station to John H. Phipps, owner of WCTV serving Tallahassee. When the sale closed in November, channel 5 changed call signs to WPTV. Phipps sold the station for $2 million in 1961 to Scripps-Howard Broadcasting, making it the fourth Scripps-Howard television station.

In the early 1960s, WPTV made two efforts to improve its signal and expand its coverage area. When Phipps filed to sell the station to Scripps-Howard, WPTV also filed to move its transmitter from near Lake Park to a site near US 441 and Lantana Road, with a new, 1,031-foot (314 m) tower. The proposed relocation, as well as a similar application by WEAT-TV, alarmed the Miami stations, who feared an incursion by WPTV and WEAT-TV into areas of Broward and Dade counties that previously were only able to receive the three commercial stations in Miami. The FCC approved the tower in February 1962, and WPTV began broadcasting from the site that September. In 1965, WPTV made a second and more controversial tower proposal. It proposed building a 2,000-foot (610 m) tower at Boca Raton, further south than the Lantana site. This would have been the tallest television tower in Florida. WPTV's proposal secured support from the Palm Beach County school board and Florida Atlantic University, both of which planned new educational TV stations. The new tower posed a further threat to the Miami TV stations by extending a city-grade picture further south into south Broward and Dade. It also struggled to obtain federal approval. The FCC and Federal Aviation Administration (FAA) had issued policies that required broadcasters seeking to build towers over 2,000 feet in height to overcome what Broadcasting magazine called "a virtual ban" that presumed such towers to be a hazard to air navigation by default. The Aircraft Owners and Pilots Association opposed the tower plan, while six Miami and Fort Lauderdale stations objected to the increased competition and potential to hurt the development of UHF telecasting in South Florida. Miami NBC affiliate WCKT also objected to the potential overlap of stations carrying NBC programming. The application remained pending until WPTV moved to dismiss it in 1968.

=== Flagler Drive studio era (1971–2001) ===
By the end of the 1960s, WPTV had outgrown the former greenhouse in Palm Beach; Jerry Renninger of The Palm Beach Post-Times described the studio as "dark" and "crowded" and the newsroom as "a narrow, corridor-like room", and the building was developing structural problems. In 1969, WPTV purchased a waterfront plot of land across the Intracoastal Waterway in West Palm Beach, at the west end of the Flagler Memorial Bridge. Ground on the 20,000-square-foot (1,900 m^{2}) facility was broken in August 1970, and WPTV moved operations at the end of May 1971.

During the late 1970s and early 1980s, WPTV remained number one in the West Palm Beach market in spite of the network's number-three status and ratings struggles. WPTV's popularity was such that NBC network programming outperformed its national average; in 1990, even weak parts of NBC's lineup on a national level, such as soap operas and the NBC Nightly News, rated first in West Palm Beach. For much of the Flagler Drive period, between 1981 and 1998, WPTV was run by general manager Bill Brooks, a former Roman Catholic priest who had previously served as the station's public service director.

=== Move to Banyan Boulevard (2001–present) ===
WPTV outgrew its Flagler Drive studio facility in the mid-1990s, when the sales department was forced to move to an office across the street. The waterfront property had become increasingly valuable. Scripps contended it had the right to develop the property with high-rise waterfront apartments, but development on the east side of Flagler Drive had become locally unpopular since the construction of the nearby, 27-story Waterview Towers. In 1982, the city of West Palm Beach imposed a moratorium to stop Scripps from developing; five years later, it scrapped a voter-approved settlement with the company. The company into the 1990s continued to push for local approval to replace the studio building with a 15-story office tower and 13-story apartment complex. In December 1995, Scripps won approval for Catalfumo Construction and Development to build the site. Two years later, Scripps agreed to a land swap with Catalfumo for a site at the intersection of Australian Avenue and Banyan Boulevard on which to build a new WPTV studio. The replacement was designed in a Mediterranean style, in keeping with local architectural tastes.

The station began broadcasting from the new, 70,000-square-foot (6,500 m^{2}) facility on March 16, 2001. Anchors Jim Sackett and Laurel Sauer began the 6 p.m. newscast from the old studio and then traveled by helicopter to the new facility to finish the newscast within half an hour. The facility featured three studios, as opposed to the prior building's two, as well as additional space for the news department and station staff. Some space was rented out, first to a commercial production company and later to Paxson Communications Corporation; WPTV provided services to Pax affiliate WPXP-TV (channel 67) under a joint sales agreement at the time. The studio was used for exterior shots on the second season of the NBC sitcom Good Morning, Miami.

On January 1, 2011, WPTV replaced WPEC as the provider of newscasts for Fox affiliate WFLX (channel 29), owned by Raycom Media. That March, Scripps and Raycom entered into a shared services agreement under which Scripps provided technical and promotional functions, as well as business office space, to WFLX while Raycom continued to manage programming and sales.

In May 2025, Scripps sold the land on which the WPTV studios stood for $40 million to a venture including Related Ross, which intends to replace the studio with a tower as high as 25 stories. Scripps has leased a site on RCA Boulevard in Palm Beach Gardens, adjacent to WPBF (channel 25), and expects to move in late 2027.

== News operation ==
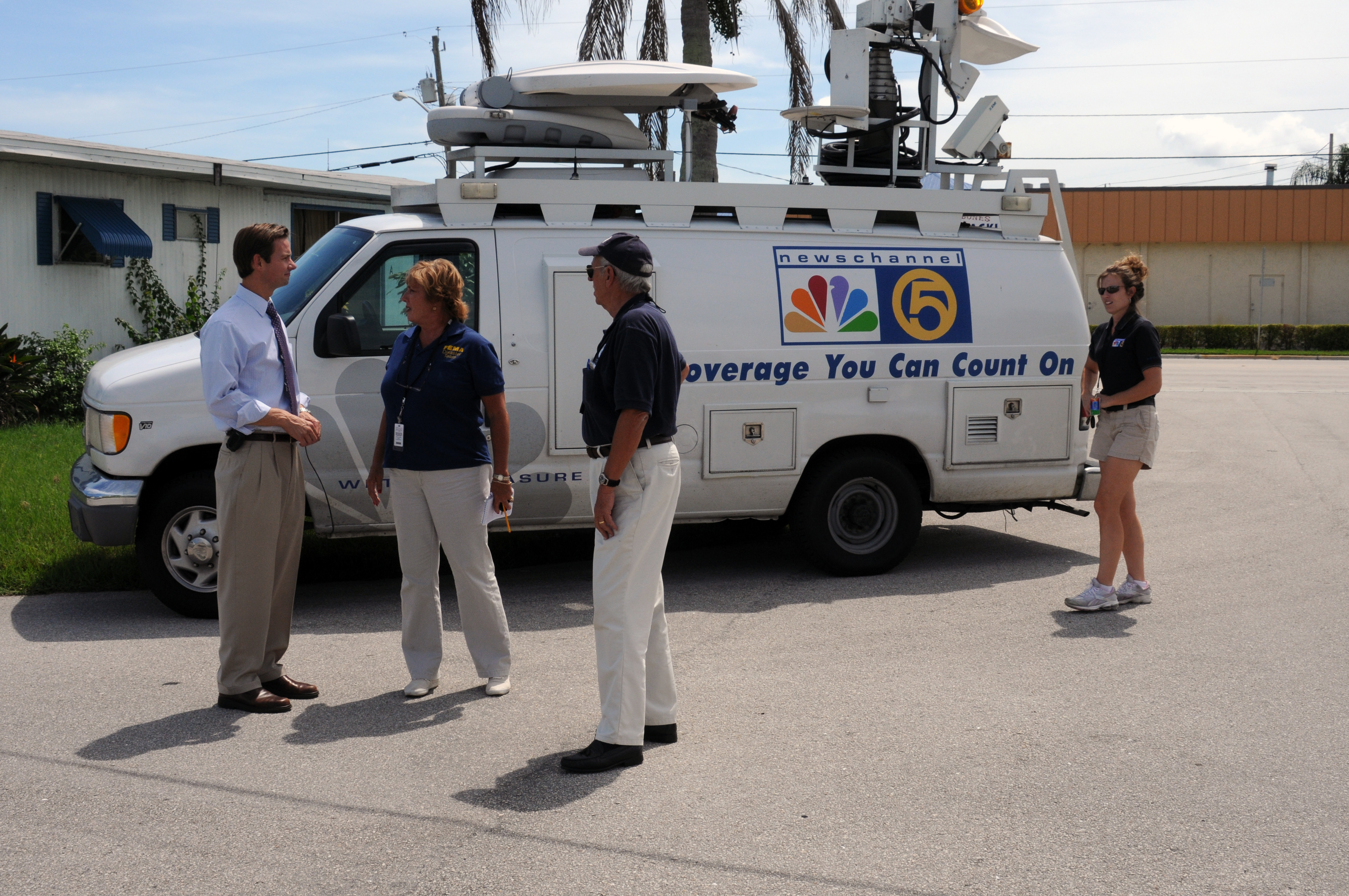
A WPTV news crew conducts an interview in 2008

WPTV built itself up as the dominant station in local news programming in West Palm Beach from early in its history. While WEAT-TV generally underinvested in news, WPTV built a highly-rated anchor team of newsman Bill Gordon, sportscaster Buck Kinnaird, and weatherman Tony Glenn that persisted throughout the 1960s and 1970s. Gordon's popularity with the older TV viewing audience in West Palm Beach propelled WPTV to large leads in total viewers. WPEC anchorman Bill Markham observed, "One of the reasons everybody watches Channel 5 in West Palm Beach is just force of habit." In 1978, Steve Sonsky wrote in The Miami Herald, "Gordon is to West Palm what Ralph Renick and Wayne Fariss are to Miami, what Cronkite is to America: an institution." Gordon anchored and served as news director from 1961 to 1978 and returned as a commentator from 1979 to 1981.

In addition to usually being the first local station to introduce new technology, WPTV had stability at its lead male anchor position, with three lead male anchors in its first 31 years. Gordon was replaced by Bob Howick, who served as news director and anchor from 1978 to 1984, and Barry Judge, who anchored from 1985 to 1989.

When Judge left, Jim Sackett—already at WPTV since 1978—became the station's main evening anchor. At 6 and 11 p.m., he was paired with Laurel Sauer. Sauer had been a popular anchor at WPEC until being demoted in January 1988, a move that caused picketing outside that station's studios. She sued WPEC to get out of the non-compete clause in her contract; a judge agreed her demotion was a breach of contract, allowing her to immediately go to work for WPTV. Sackett and Sauer were WPTV's main evening team for the next 18 years. WPTV demoted Sauer from the 11 p.m. newscast in October 2007, prompting her to leave the next year; Sackett retired in 2011, ending a 33-year career at WPTV.

In 1990, ratings surveys found that WPTV had nearly as many or more viewers than all other local stations combined for its 5:30, 6, and 11 p.m. newscasts. The news department gradually expanded, introducing a 5 p.m. newscast in 1990 and weekend morning news in 1992 and lengthening its morning newscast from 30 minutes to two hours over the course of the decade.

The market's news ratings race tightened in the 2000s, when WPBF—which had been the third-place station since its 1989 debut—improved its product as WPEC narrowed the gap with WPTV. In November 2007, WPEC beat out WPTV in late news by 155 households. While WPTV led most news ratings races in 2014, it had mostly been supplanted by WPBF as of 2024; WPTV placed second at 5, 6, and 11 p.m. but led at 6 a.m.

When WPTV took over news production for WFLX, it began producing 17 hours a week of newscasts for that station, consisting of an hour-long 10 p.m. nightly newscast and a two-hour morning show at 7 a.m. weekdays. WFLX newscasts originated from a separate set. A half-hour 4 p.m. newscast was added in August 2011 and discontinued in 2014. Under the most recent version of the WFLX agreement with Raycom's successor Gray Media, signed in 2020, Scripps dedicates two anchors, a meteorologist, and two reporters to each of the morning and 10 p.m. newscasts, as well as a total of four producers to newscasts on WFLX. Also included in the agreement was a clause allowing WFLX to launch a 6:30 p.m. newscast if WPTV added a 7 p.m. newscast.

=== Notable former on-air staff ===
- Mark Alford – environmental reporter, 1991–1993
- Glenn Burns – meteorologist, 1976–1979
- Andrea Canning – reporter
- Cari Champion – reporter and anchor, 2003–2006
- Tom Dunn – weekend anchor, 1988–1998
- Marci Gonzalez – reporter, weekend anchor
- Van Hackett – anchor, 1973–1976
- Bob Lorenz – sports anchor
- Jennifer Lopez – meteorologist, 1996–1997
- Jim Mueller – sports anchor, 1968–1971
- Jennifer Valoppi – reporter and anchor, 1981–1985

== Technical information ==
=== Subchannels ===
WPTV-TV's transmitter is located southwest of West Palm Beach along US 441. The station's signal is multiplexed:

Subchannels of WPTV-TV
Subchannel	Res.	Short name	Programming
5.1	1080i	WPTV-TV	NBC
5.2	480i	IONPLUS	Ion Plus
5.3	480i	LAFF	Laff
5.4	480i	Ion	Ion
5.5	480i	GET	Great
5.6	480i	QVC2	QVC2
5.7	480i	Shop LC	Shop LC
5.8	480i	MVSGLD	MovieSphere Gold
48.2	480i	Charge!	Charge! (WWHB-CD)

=== Analog-to-digital conversion ===
WPTV began broadcasting a digital signal on UHF channel 55 in April 2003, at the culmination of a tower replacement project at the Lantana Road site. The new mast was 300 feet (91 m) taller than the existing one and provided space to co-locate other TV and radio transmission facilities. WPTV maintained separate digital and analog signals until the digital television transition on June 12, 2009; after the transition, the digital signal relocated from channel 55 to channel 12 in the VHF band.
