= WFOR-TV =

Television station in Miami

- Miami–Fort Lauderdale, Florida; United States
- City: Miami, Florida
- Channels: Digital: 22 (UHF); Virtual: 4
- Branding: CBS Miami; CBS News Miami

Programming
- Affiliations: 4.1: CBS; for others, see § Subchannels

Ownership
- Owner: CBS Television Stations Inc.
- Sister stations: WBFS-TV

History
- First air date: September 20, 1967
- Former call signs: WCIX-TV (1967–1984); WCIX (1984–1995)
- Former channel number: Analog: 6 (VHF, 1967–1995), 4 (VHF, 1995–2009)
- Former affiliations: Independent (1967–1986); Fox (1986–1988)
- Call sign meaning: "Channel 4"

Technical information
- Licensing authority: FCC
- Facility ID: 47902
- ERP: 1,000 kW
- HAAT: 296.9 m (974 ft)
- Transmitter coordinates: 25°58′8″N 80°13′19″W

Links
- Public license information: Public file; LMS
- Website: www.cbsnews.com/miami/

WFOR-TV (channel 4), branded as CBS Miami, is a television station in Miami, Florida, United States. It is owned and operated by the CBS television network through its CBS Television Stations division alongside WBFS-TV (channel 33), an affiliate of The CW. The two stations share studios on Northwest 18th Terrace in Doral; WFOR-TV's transmitter is located in Andover, Florida.

The history of this station begins with the assignment of channel 6 as the fifth very high frequency (VHF) channel for Miami in 1957. However, unlike the previously available channels, channel 6 would need to broadcast from a site further south because it operated on the same frequency as a full-service station in Orlando. After a multiple-year proceeding, the Federal Communications Commission granted a construction permit to Coral Television for WCIX-TV in 1964. Coral's earlier attempts to build the transmitter on one of the upper Florida Keys failed to materialize, and the station began broadcasting in September 1967 from a tower in Homestead. Even though over-the-air reception proved difficult in much of Broward County, WCIX-TV largely thrived as an independent station, and later the market's first Fox affiliate, under General Cinema Corporation and Taft Broadcasting ownership and featured a nightly 10 p.m. newscast.

Taft's 1987 sale of WCIX and five other stations to the TVX Broadcast Group came at the same time NBC purchased long-standing CBS affiliate WTVJ; after CBS failed to finalize a contract with outgoing NBC affiliate WSVN, the network purchased WCIX from TVX in January 1989, with channel 6 becoming the new CBS station in Miami. Because of the weak signal in Broward, CBS induced an affiliation switch in the West Palm Beach market to a station that offered signal coverage in the northern part of the market. CBS also expanded the news department, though it continued to rate in last place among the English-language stations in the market. In the wake of Hurricane Andrew in 1992, the station lost the use of its Homestead tower for nearly two years and set up a charitable organization, now known as Neighbors 4 Neighbors, to promote volunteer efforts in South Florida.

A complicated transaction between CBS and NBC saw WTVJ and WCIX swap transmitter sites and broadcast licenses in September 1995, with WCIX "moving" to channel 4 and becoming WFOR-TV. CBS's 2000 merger into the first iteration of Viacom added then-UPN affiliate WBFS-TV as a sister station. The local news offered by WFOR-TV generally continued to lag in the ratings after the move to channel 4 but has been more competitive since the late 1990s.

== WCIX-TV, channel 6 ==
=== Channel 6 in Miami ===
In June 1956, the Federal Communications Commission (FCC) proposed adding a fifth very high frequency (VHF) channel to Miami: channel 6, in addition to channels 2 (educational), 4, 7, and 10. The proposal met with some puzzlement among Miami television officials. Channel 6 had been assigned to Orlando and was used by WDBO-TV. A new channel 6 station in Miami would need to locate its transmitter at least 220 miles (350 km) from the Orlando station, which would force the tower to be sited as far south as Homestead and have a height limit to accommodate nearby Homestead Air Force Base.

The addition of channel 6 brought a glimmer of hope to WITV, a flagging ultra high frequency (UHF) station on channel 17 which applied to the FCC in July 1957 and sought to move to channel 6. New applicants also made overtures of interest in the channel in late 1957 and early 1958, including Publix Broadcasting (a group of Miami Beach attorneys; no relation to the supermarket chain); the South Florida Amusement Company, which operated movie theaters; and Coral Television Corporation, whose principal, Leon McAskill, was the president of a company that published a weekly in Miami Beach. The owners of the now-closed WITV, Gerico Investment Co., unsuccessfully appealed in hopes of getting the right to automatically move to channel 6, but in January 1959, an appeals court decided that it must face other potential applicants.

In May 1959, hearings opened among South Florida Amusement, Publix, and Coral. A tentative decision was recommended by a hearing examiner in September 1960 and announced in March 1961, favoring South Florida Amusement on the grounds that it had greater experience in broadcasting. The president of South Florida Amusement, Sherwin Grossman, soon came under closer scrutiny for his actions while running WBUF-TV in Buffalo, New York. WBUF-TV had operated at a loss from 1953 to 1955, shut down, and then was sold to NBC and revived for another three years. Coral alleged that Grossman had ordered program logs from 1955, immediately prior to the NBC takeover, not be made available to anyone; that his Buffalo station had aired a bingo program in contravention of the Code of Practices for Television Broadcasters and never delivered promised prizes; and that WBUF-TV had aired excessive commercials during movies. While the FCC initially did not admit the evidence, the uncovering of new data led the commission to reopen the record in the first week of 1962, with new charges that letters from Buffalo civic leaders supporting the addition of VHF stations there had been forged. Despite the initial nod and after being cleared of allegations of wrongdoing, Grossman was allowed to withdraw from contention in November 1963, paving the way for the other applicant, Coral Television Company, to receive the construction permit on May 1, 1964. The station then took the call sign WCIX-TV on May 21.

=== Tower siting ===
Coral had originally proposed to locate its tower on one of the Ragged Keys, due east of Black Point. The Florida Cabinet agreed in December 1964 to lend Coral the land to erect a 1,546-foot (471 m) tower, with the company hoping that the site 214.8 miles (345.7 km) from WDBO-TV would receive an FCC waiver. Nearly immediately, however, a problem arose: an attorney lobbied the state for a delay, and property owners on Key Biscayne and Ragged Key filed objections. The Zoning Appeals Board approved, only for the director of planning and zoning to appeal the decision to the Metro Commission; other local interests, including the Dade County Port Authority, the Izaak Walton League, and the Audubon Society, also opposed. Meanwhile, Coral asked for approval from the Federal Aviation Administration. It also acquired a color production truck, dubbed "Cortez 6", and leased it to clients such as public broadcaster WTHS-TV.

However, the company opted to change its plans and instead build a 1,000-foot (300 m) tower near Redlands, Florida, at Coconut Palm and Tennessee roads. This site received federal and Dade County approval in April 1966, though final FCC approval took longer to secure, in part because WLBW-TV charged that there had been a transfer of control and because the FCC had originally assigned it to cover South Miami, not Miami. In March 1967, the station began moving into its first studio facility: a round, midcentury structure at 1111 Brickell Avenue which had previously been built as a law office. This replaced temporary station offices in the Dupont Plaza Hotel which had previously been earmarked for development as permanent quarters.

=== The early years ===
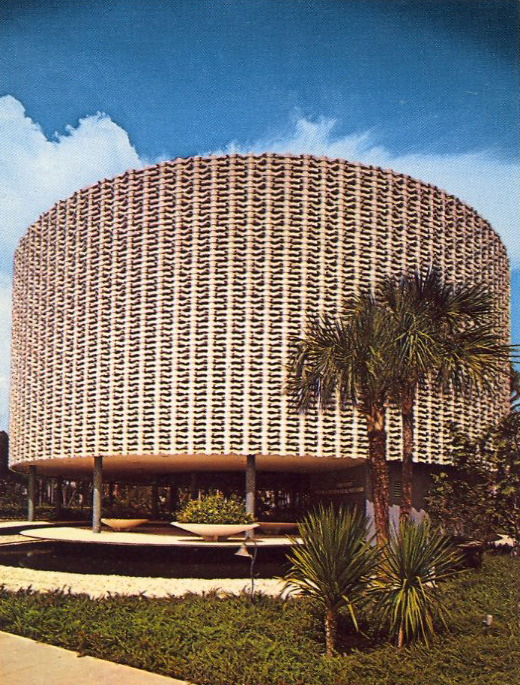
This round five-story office building on Brickell Avenue in downtown Miami, originally built for a law firm, served as the first studio home for WCIX-TV.

WCIX-TV finally signed on the air on September 20, 1967. It was Miami's first independent station and promoted itself as a "Carousel of Color"; local programming included a children's show hosted by the "White Baron", who also drove a white custom car and flew a white biplane over South Florida, and the station's first local 10 p.m. newscast, hosted by newspaper columnist Hy Gardner. In addition, WCIX-TV offered two Spanish-language programs on weekends; by March 1969, it also had a weeknight 11 p.m. newscast in Spanish. The station's financial picture became a question in September 1968. After an appeals court ruling in favor of WLBW-TV on its objection, the FCC set a hearing as to whether there had been an unauthorized transfer of control of Coral. WCIX-TV was not cleared in the transfer of control case until October 1971.

General Cinema Corporation acquired more than $1 million in debentures in Coral Television from American Viscose Corporation at the end of 1968. General Cinema then opted to convert its debentures into majority control of Coral Television in 1972.

The southerly location of the WCIX-TV transmitter meant that many areas north of Fort Lauderdale in Broward County did not receive an acceptable signal. The station made up for this shortfall in its coverage area by signing on translator stations throughout Broward County and in Boca Raton in 1972. Initially broadcasting on channel 61 from the First National Bank building in Fort Lauderdale, channel 64 from atop the Boca Raton Hotel, and channel 69 from the Home Federal building in Hollywood, WCIX added a 1,000-watt translator on channel 33 transmitting from Hallandale in 1974. The channel 33 translator was shut down in early 1984 to allow WBFS-TV to sign on; as a result, WCIX lost significant circulation in Palm Beach County.

WCIX-TV also grew its reach through cable systems in South Florida. As early as 1968, cable systems in Lehigh Acres and Fort Myers Beach on the west coast fed the station to their subscribers; it was added to the system in West Palm Beach on a part-time basis in March 1975 and to systems in southern and central Brevard County that September. In West Palm Beach and Brevard County, it shared time with WKID (channel 51). As this happened, the station grew its audience share in the Miami area of dominant influence. In May 1975, it captured the tenth-highest audience share of any independent station in the United States. By May 1979, Star Trek reruns on WCIX-TV at 6 p.m. successfully tied WCKT's hour-long local newscast in the ratings. WCIX-TV added an all-night movie showcase hosted by veteran radio host Big Wilson in June 1979; Night Owl Movies became a fixture at the station for the next five years, highlighted by Wilson's live piano performances, ad-libbing and commercial pitches. Chuck Zink, a longtime children's show host at WTVJ, also joined WCIX-TV in 1982 to host an afternoon movie and interstitials during The Mike Douglas Show.

=== Taft Broadcasting ownership ===
While General Cinema had first explored selling WCIX-TV in 1974, it retained the station for another eight years. Even though it was General Cinema's only television property, channel 6's profits more than offset the three money-losing radio stations it owned. General Cinema traded WCIX-TV to Cincinnati-based Taft Broadcasting in early 1983 in exchange for WGR-TV in Buffalo and $70 million.

Under Taft, WCIX (the station officially dropped the "-TV" suffix from its call sign in 1984) had to contend with an increasingly crowded independent station marketplace in South Florida. Even though WKID served primarily as a carrier for ON TV subscription programming, two new stations began broadcasting general-entertainment formats. First on air was WDZL (channel 39) in October 1982, followed by Milton Grant-owned WBFS-TV (channel 33) in December 1984. Taft struck back with more aggressive program purchases. In 1983, for the first time in station history, WCIX carried Miami Dolphins preseason games; the relationship continues to this day, making it the longest-tenured preseason TV rights partner in the NFL. However, by March 1986, WBFS had tied WCIX as the top independent station in South Florida.

Taft also began the process of moving WCIX out of 1111 Brickell. The building sat on some of Miami's most desirable real estate and had not been explicitly designed for television use. However, the station's first attempt to locate in West Dade was rebuffed because of its proximity to a nearby elementary school, and county officials also rejected a proposal to add height to the tower as a possible safety risk. A studio site at NW 18th Terrace was selected, and WCIX moved to the West Dade facility in September 1985; the 1111 Brickell building was then demolished in July 1988. WCIX also upgraded its transmissions, becoming South Florida's first commercial TV station to broadcast in stereo in June 1985 and one of the first in the United States to offer Spanish-language audio for selected programs (including newscasts) later that year.

On October 9, 1986, WCIX became a charter affiliate of the newly launched Fox Broadcasting Company, whose initial offerings were the talk show The Late Show Starring Joan Rivers and later weekend prime time programming; it was one of a handful of VHF stations to affiliate with the network upon its launch.

=== Acquisition by CBS ===
CBS's interest in WCIX was legitimate. We saw it as a tremendous asset opportunity. I can understand people at WTVJ being upset because this apparently did drive down the price (for their 1987 sale), but there was never to my knowledge any Machiavellian plan afoot. It's always more fun to have conspiracy theories, but that's really not Larry Tisch's style.

— Peter Lund, CBS executive

At the same time WCIX joined Fox, the station became part of a multi-year dispute between NBC, CBS, and Sunbeam Television. Wometco Enterprises, parent of CBS affiliate WTVJ, was taken private in a 1983 leveraged buyout by Kohlberg Kravis Roberts (KKR), which also purchased Storer Communications in 1985. The FCC approved the Storer buyout on the condition KKR divest either the cable systems held by both Wometco and Storer or WTVJ and WAGA-TV (Note: While Wometco and Storer remained nominally separate companies, the FCC recognized it as a combined entity under KKR control. Wometco operated cable systems in Atlanta where Storer's WAGA-TV was based, while Storer operated cable systems in Miami; this therefore placed KKR in violation of broadcast-cable system cross-ownership restrictions.) within 18 months. KKR opted to sell WTVJ, along with Storer's television stations, to Lorimar-Telepictures in May 1986 in a $1.85 billion deal, with WTVJ alone selling for $405 million. By October, KKR amended the deal to exclude WTVJ; several days later, The Miami Herald reported that CBS had inquired with Taft about purchasing WCIX for as much as $125 million, prompting Lorimar to rescind their interest in WTVJ. While CBS's valuation of WCIX was a fraction of WTVJ's asking price, the talks with Taft ended when network chairman Laurence Tisch expressed worry over the CBS Evening News rating badly enough on WCIX that the newscast's slumping national ratings would be affected further. WTVJ general manager Alan Perris later claimed that Tisch objected to Lorimar—who produced Dallas, Knots Landing, and Falcon Crest for the network—wanting to purchase a significant portion of the affiliate base and threatened to disaffiliate all of the CBS stations in the deal.

CBS's offer to buy WTVJ for $170 million was deemed unacceptable to KKR, which valued the station between $250 million and $300 million; the network claimed much of the station's profits came from frequently preempting network programming. KKR then offered WTVJ to both Capital Cities/ABC Inc. and NBC parent company General Electric under the belief a competing network would not have their bids affected by a CBS disaffiliation threat, internally referred to as "that Channel 6 card". ABC declined the offer, but rumblings of interest in the station by NBC quickly emerged; negotiations were purposefully kept hidden over the next few weeks in an effort to prevent Tisch from knowing anything in advance. KKR agreed to sell WTVJ to General Electric Property Management Co. (a holding company for NBC) on January 16, 1987, for $270 million, a markdown of $135 million from Lorimar's prior purchase agreement. For the first time in the history of North American television, a broadcast network directly purchased an affiliate of a competing network.

Taft Broadcasting, which was undergoing a corporate restructuring, sold WCIX and five other independent stations to the TVX Broadcast Group for a combined $240 million in November 1986. This agreement contained a clause that allowed CBS to make an offer on WCIX-TV within 10 days of the sale being announced, per a report in Electronic Media. Despite renewed talks with CBS to the outgoing ownership, when the deal was finalized on March 30, 1987, TVX president Tim McDonald told The Miami News that WCIX was not only not for sale but that TVX was committed to investing into the station, effectively forcing CBS into negotiating with existing NBC affiliate WSVN by default. Complicating matters was WSVN's existing affiliation contract with NBC that ran through the end of 1988 and which NBC pledged to honor even after the WTVJ purchase was completed. By contrast, WTVJ's CBS contract was set to expire in April 1988 but would be extended on a two-week basis for the remainder of the year. Ed Ansin, president of WSVN owner Sunbeam Television, contested NBC's purchase of WTVJ up to the point it was approved by the FCC in September 1987.

Conventional wisdom assumed CBS would affiliate with WSVN, but an impasse developed around Ansin's demand that a CBS contract be effective on January 1, 1989, when WSVN's NBC contract was to end. Sports broadcasts were the reason for Ansin's unwavering date: NBC was to carry the 1988 Summer Olympics, the 1988 World Series, and a majority of Miami Dolphins football games thanks to the network's NFL-AFC broadcast rights. Tony Malara, president of CBS's affiliate relations division, insisted CBS was deeply distressed at having to remain on a station controlled by NBC; WSVN general manager Bob Leider countered that CBS never mentioned such distress during the negotiations, and Ansin claimed CBS had agreed to his timeframe, which Malara denied. Ansin made arrangements to fly to New York City on April 26 to sign a CBS contract at Black Rock when Malara called off the meeting, citing that they were reaching out to other parties regarding a purchase or affiliation. Malara said to Ansin the trip was pointless if he would not waver off the January 1 date and later told the Herald, "at that point, we'd lost our appetite" for Ansin.

If we do it, it'll be important for me to come down to Miami on Fridays during the winter to check things out.

— Howard Stringer, CBS station group president, on rumors of the network purchasing WCIX

Meanwhile, TVX's Taft purchase gave it stations in markets far larger than those where it had traditionally operated. TVX's bankers, Salomon Brothers, provided the financing for the acquisition and in return held more than 60 percent of the company. The company was to pay Salomon Brothers $200 million on January 1, 1988, and missed the first payment deadline, having been unable to lure investors to its junk bonds even before Black Monday. TVX began to sell many of its smaller-market stations, and CBS expressed further interest in the station. To resolve the problem that had discouraged CBS in its first look at WCIX-TV, the network began analyzing executing a second affiliation switch in the West Palm Beach market to ensure continued coverage in Broward. WTVX, the CBS affiliate there, was a UHF outlet based in Fort Pierce and had only become a full-market station in 1980; the network eyed moving to one of the two VHF stations, WPEC and WPTV. Rumors were already swirling in the market when a story in Electronic Media noted that CBS and Salomon Brothers were talking. In Miami and West Palm Beach, chatter about an impending two-market affiliation switch grew. Howard Stringer, the new CBS station group president, told the News on August 5 that he expected a resolution "very soon... probably by next week", while Ed Ansin admitted to not being in contact with anyone from CBS since April.

On August 8, 1988, CBS announced it would spend $59 million to buy WCIX. The network also announced that it would move from WTVX to WPEC in the West Palm Beach market at the same time that it moved from WTVJ to WCIX in the Miami market. Even with the WPEC arrangement, both WTVJ and WSVN sent literature to advertising clients mocking WCIX's broadcast signal, with WSVN's packet stating "WCIX does not deliver". WCIX began carrying CBS programs displaced by WTVJ during the interregnum, including The Price Is Right, Card Sharks and CBS News Nightwatch in October, and Sunday Morning (which WPLG had carried) and Face the Nation in December. WSVN agreed to assume the Fox affiliation, aided partially by the cancellation of The Late Show, but was promoting itself as a news-intensive independent. While the affiliation switches officially took effect at 3 a.m. on January 1, 1989, WCIX carried CBS's Happy New Year, America directly after their final night of Fox programming. CBS's purchase of WCIX took effect on January 3; while this partially prevented the network from mounting an on-air promotional effort, the station did engage in an outdoor billboard campaign, with one billboard for Murder, She Wrote featuring a dagger piercing a numeral "4".

=== As a CBS owned-and-operated station ===
WCIX's first logo under CBS ownership, introduced in the summer of 1989.

Despite a significant technical overhaul and upgraded programming, WCIX struggled as a CBS station due to its weak signal in Fort Lauderdale. CBS continued to operate a local telephone number for any home reception issues into the summer of 1989, employed a director of cable and viewer relations for WCIX, and offered installation of dual-pointed antennas for $90 through a marketing tie-in with Sears. In 1989, CBS leased a new low-power TV station, W27AQ, which broadcast on channel 27 from a transmitter in Pompano Beach. A transmitter at Coral Springs, W55BO, was launched in 1993; the former channel 69 transmitter license was reactivated on channel 58 as W58BU in 1994.

However, immediate appraisals of WCIX's performance under CBS were quite poor. Ratings for the CBS Evening News fell by more than half in the first two months. In July, Stringer—who had overseen the August 1988 purchase of the station—told the media that CBS owning WCIX was "a disaster" and noted that with its signal troubles, "We can never be better than third." Station and network management were forced to control the fallout from the remark, which made the front page of Variety; Stringer apologized, and Tisch issued a memorandum noting that the network was "well aware" of the situation it was facing but fervently believed that CBS's resources could make WCIX successful. Ad agencies noted that WSVN continued to behave like a network affiliate and WCIX like an independent in the ratings and that they allocated their advertising budgets accordingly.

WCIX's transmission tower collapsed on August 24, 1992, as a result of destructive winds caused by Hurricane Andrew, forcing channel 6 off the air. Within hours, the station resumed broadcasts via the channel 27 translator at Pompano Beach. WDZL began carrying WCIX's newscasts the next day. Within several days, WCIX was back on the air using an emergency transmitter on a borrowed tower near the Dade–Broward line; as a result of being further north, the facility had to operate at reduced power. In April 1993, CBS began brokering time on Miami's WDLP-TV (channel 35), whose antenna was in Kendall, as an aid to viewers in cities south of Miami, where Andrew had interrupted cable service. While the temporary facility incidentally improved reception in Broward, the FCC would not permit a permanent relocation of channel 6 to this site because of short-spacing to Orlando, forcing CBS to begin planning to rebuild at Homestead even though some homeowners there feared the tower could fall on homes in another storm. The Homestead tower was rebuilt and reactivated in June 1994; the new mast cost $5 million and was designed to handle winds of 145 miles per hour (233 km/h), greater than Andrew's maximum velocity.

In the wake of the devastation caused by Andrew, WCIX's staff helped create Neighbors Helping Neighbors, a grassroots charitable organization which aimed to help people rebuild. The organization lives on as Neighbors 4 Neighbors, which is still supported by the station; the National Association of Broadcasters honored WFOR-TV in 1999 with its first Service to America Award for its "exemplary" community outreach. In 2017, Neighbors 4 Neighbors furnished more than $800,000 in goods and services to South Florida organizations.

== WFOR-TV, channel 4 ==
=== Move to channel 4 ===
The Grade A signal contours of channels 4 and 6 in Miami as they existed in the early 1990s. Channel 4's signal (red) broadcast from a tower midway between Miami and Fort Lauderdale and provided primary coverage of areas from Boca Raton in the north to Goulds in the south. Channel 6's signal (blue) broadcast from a tower at Homestead, in the southern portion of the metropolitan area, and did not adequately reach populous areas in Broward County north of Fort Lauderdale–Hollywood International Airport.

Fox's announcement that it would affiliate with twelve TV stations owned by New World Communications in May 1994 touched off two and a half years of affiliation switches in markets across the United States, much like the one that had affected the Miami and West Palm Beach markets in 1989. After Scripps-Howard Broadcasting and ABC executed a group affiliation agreement in June (also renewing two key affiliations in Detroit and Cleveland and acquiring the ABC rights in Phoenix and Tampa), one of the newly affected markets was Baltimore. There, the outgoing ABC affiliate was Westinghouse Broadcasting (Group W)'s WJZ-TV. Group W then signed a 10-year affiliation agreement and joint venture partnership with CBS announced on July 14. That deal saw three Group W stations—WJZ-TV, WBZ-TV in Boston, and KYW-TV in Philadelphia—becoming CBS affiliates.

The Group W–CBS deal created a new problem in Philadelphia. KYW-TV was NBC's affiliate there, while CBS owned WCAU-TV. Immediately, Fox and NBC began angling for the station. Fox pulled out of the bidding in September after signing an agreement to buy its affiliate there, WTXF. At that time, speculation began about a trade between CBS and NBC, where NBC would receive WCAU-TV in exchange for NBC-owned stations elsewhere in the United States. By early September, Mediaweek was reporting the outlines of what NBC would give CBS in return: KCNC-TV in Denver; KUTV in Salt Lake City, which that network was in the process of acquiring; and WTVJ on channel 4, which—unlike channel 6—was unencumbered by transmitter siting difficulties.

The deal was announced on November 21, 1994, and involved a trade of FCC licenses, transmitter facilities, and channel numbers. As part of the deal, WCIX would be transferred to the CBS–Group W joint venture and change its call sign to WFOR-TV. (Note: The deal was structured in such a way that WFOR-TV operates on the former WTVJ license and WTVJ operates on the former WCIX license.) The move was an upgrade for CBS and a downgrade for NBC, as channel 6 alone did not adequately reach 15 to 25 percent of the market. Additionally, WCIX had a reputation of being one of the lowest-rated CBS affiliates for large events, such as the Super Bowl and television miniseries. The channel 6 problem, which had been CBS's since 1989, would soon become NBC's issue, while CBS was returning to channel 4: WCIX general manager Allen Shaklan said, "[e]xcept for the past six years, channel 4 has always been the home of CBS ... I guess you can go home again.

The switch was intended to be executed in early July, but delays in obtaining FCC approval pushed it back; the commission granted the transfers in August, setting up the switch for 1 a.m. on September 10, 1995. The deal also included the Broward County translators that repeated channel 6. CBS reacquired full control of WFOR-TV after Group W's parent, Westinghouse Electric Corporation, merged with CBS at the end of 1995. In the immediate aftermath, NBC's ratings fell on the weaker channel 6, but CBS ratings did not improve.

=== Forming a duopoly ===
WFOR-TV "CBS 4" logo, in use from 1999 to 2010.

Allen Shaklan, general manager of WFOR-TV at the time of the channel switch, was replaced by Steve Mauldin in 1998. Building off a personal relationship with Roger King of King World Productions, Mauldin made a key syndicated programming acquisition: the popular The Oprah Winfrey Show, which helped boost the ratings for channel 4's early evening newscasts. In November 1999, WFOR-TV had the highest total-day ratings in the market, a station first. By 2001, Broadcasting & Cable had described the station as a "bright spot" in a CBS owned-and-operated station group that mostly suffered from low ratings.

In 2000, Viacom bought CBS. This brought Viacom's Miami station, WBFS-TV, and WTVX in the West Palm Beach market (both affiliates of UPN) under the same corporate umbrella; WBFS-TV moved into WFOR-TV's Doral studios, and in 2001, all three stations were placed under general manager Mauldin. (Note: CBS exited the West Palm Beach market in 2007 by selling WTVX and two low-power stations there, along with three stations in other cities, to Four Points Media Group, a subsidiary of Cerberus Capital Management.) However, WFOR-TV's share of Miami market revenues stagnated at around 14 percent from 2001 to 2006 under Mauldin and his successor, Brian Kennedy.

From 2020 to 2022, WFOR shared the over-the-air broadcast rights to Major League Soccer's Inter Miami CF with WBFS-TV. (Note: All Major League Soccer local television rights agreements ended after 2022 to make way for MLS's 10-year deal with Apple.)

CBS named Darryll Green general manager of WFOR–WBFS in 2021; Green is the first African American general manager of a TV station in the market.

== News operation ==
=== As an independent station ===
A 10 p.m. newscast debuted with WCIX-TV in 1967, but Coral lacked the financial resources to do much in the area of news. However, General Cinema bolstered the operation and relaunched it in 1973 under the name Eyewitness News, with a seven-night-a-week 10 p.m. report. WTVJ weekend anchorman Prescott Robinson joined the news team on channel 6, and the station also became the first customer of Television News Inc., a newsfilm service marketed to independent stations. A news set was built in what had been a conference room at the 1111 Brickell facility; the large wooden conference table, a holdover from when the building was a law office, was so heavy that the news set was built over the tabletop.

WCIX-TV's newscast remained half an hour until it became an hourlong program in June 1978; Robinson departed and was replaced by Larry Klaas, while the previously dropped weekend newscasts were reinstated. However, the program still suffered from a comparatively low budget and fewer resources than the network-affiliated stations' news offerings. Klaas was replaced by Barbara Sloan, who had been anchoring on WFBC-TV in Greenville, South Carolina, and was spotted by news director Dick Descutner on someone else's audition tape. By that time, the WCIX-TV news hour consisted of a half-hour local newscast and the syndicated Independent Network News.

Shortly after taking over, Taft announced its own plans to revamp the news operation, replacing the director. Local weekend news was restored again in 1984 with former WPLG reporter Gail Anderson as anchor, and Independent Network News was dropped, leaving just the local half-hour newscast. In 1988, the station signed Ralph Renick—the longtime news director and anchor at WTVJ who had left the station after 1985 to make a short-lived run for Governor of Florida—to contribute nightly commentaries to its newscasts, in addition to hosting a weekly panel discussion show.

=== Action News ===
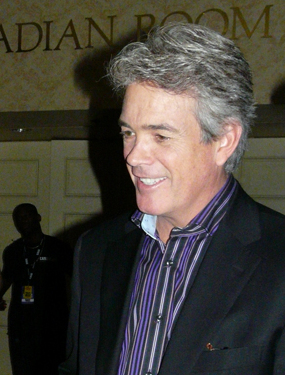
John Roberts, known as "J. D. Roberts" while at WCIX from 1989 to 1990.

On January 1, 1989, WCIX-TV switched from airing a 10 p.m. newscast to 6 and 11 p.m. broadcasts, with Renick's editorials flanking the 6 p.m. newscast as a lead-in for the CBS Evening News. However, because CBS did not take over the station until January 3, 1989, it was unable to make immediate sweeping changes to the news operation, which had a staff of 35, half the personnel of the other Miami-market stations. CBS hired additional talent from elsewhere, including Giselle Fernández from Chicago, J. D. Roberts from Toronto, and Dan Coughlin from Cleveland. Veteran WTVJ reporter Al Sunshine joined WCIX as an investigative reporter, a position he held for the next 25 years. Rebranded as Action News in May 1989, WCIX debuted a 6:30 p.m. newscast in July; this moved the CBS Evening News to 7 p.m. and restored a network evening newscast to that time slot in the market (WSVN had aired the NBC Nightly News at 7 when it was an NBC affiliate). The new program was hosted by Sloan and Fernández.

Veteran anchor John Hambrick, who succeeded Renick at WTVJ, joined WCIX at the end of 1989, beginning a 3 1/2-year stint at the station. Coughlin and Roberts both left WCIX in 1990: Coughlin joined SportsChannel Ohio as a Cleveland Indians play-by-play announcer, while Roberts moved back to Toronto for a role at CTV News. Renick also retired in September 1990 for what was later revealed to be a terminal cancer diagnosis. Meteorologist Bob Soper, fired from WSVN in March 1992 for having an on-air style that did not align with their tabloid format, joined WCIX by that September as co-host of a nightly program tied to the Neighbors Helping Neighbors initiative along with some forecasting duties; Soper remained with the station until his retirement in 2005.

In the station's final two years as WCIX, a highly touted approach to news coverage garnered national attention and was copied in other markets but failed to attract ratings. In May 1994, the station announced that it would change its 4 and 6 p.m. newscasts to a "family sensitive" format with no violent footage and reduce the prevalence of crime news in all of its newscasts. While it was not the first station to feature such a format (notably among them, CBS-owned WCCO-TV in Minneapolis–Saint Paul), the move came during the May ratings period and was promoted with a full-page newspaper ad. Critics called into question the sincerity of the change given that in between the two "family sensitive" newscasts was the comparatively racy syndicated talk show Geraldo. That ratings period saw a 24 percent year-over-year decline for viewership of channel 6's 6 p.m. newscast. While some other stations adopted the format around the United States, WCIX was not the only station to experience ratings declines. News director Sue Kawalerski, who implemented the idea, unexpectedly left in June 1995, and the format was dropped alongside the move to channel 4 that September.

=== WFOR-TV ===
The station's newscasts were rebranded News 4 South Florida upon moving from channel 6 to channel 4. More changes followed in the months after the channel change; Sloan departed, while the station added 21 new positions in the news department. One of those new hires came directly from WTVJ: Bryan Norcross was hired as chief meteorologist in February 1996, in addition to an on-air contributor role for CBS News during the Atlantic hurricane season; Norcross also co-anchored a new 5:30 p.m. newscast. An hour-long morning newscast also debuted in February 1996, making channel 4 the last English-language station in town to compete in mornings. The station also received a news helicopter, "Chopper 4"; its zoom camera, one of only a handful in the United States, provided unique images of the recovery of the black box of ValuJet Flight 592 from the Florida Everglades in May 1996, and it was also used in police rescue efforts.

Steve Mauldin's arrival in late 1998 heralded major changes at WFOR-TV. Six weeks after he started, a fire erupted at the under-construction American Airlines Arena in Miami. He found himself frustrated with the station's coverage of the event. In 2001, he told Broadcasting & Cable, "I sat here in my office with about six TVs"; other stations arrived on the scene first, including one from West Palm Beach. The station was last in the ratings at 5 p.m. and second to last at 6 and 11. As part of an overhaul that included a new news director (formerly of WSVN) and a new main anchor team, the station got a new look with more tropical colors—Mauldin derided the last look as one that could have been used in Dayton, Ohio—and newscast music with a salsa beat. The station kept up high ratings for some time; in February 2003, it led in total households for its 11 p.m. newscast for the first time ever, even despite a change in anchor from Steve Wolford to Eliott Rodriguez. Rodriguez was then moved to the noon and 5:30 p.m. newscasts to make way for the pairing of Maggie Rodriguez and Robb Hanrahan, the latter returning to the market after seven years. Norcross left WFOR in 2008 to devote time to an emergency communications business he established with former National Hurricane Center director Max Mayfield.

In 2010, WFOR-TV began broadcasting its local newscasts in high definition as part of an overhaul of the station's on-air news presentation, including a new logo. WFOR's newscasts were expanded in 2017 with a new 4:30 a.m. morning half-hour and a newscast at 7 p.m.; both additions occurred alongside the arrival of Hurricane Irma. The station was a recipient of an Alfred I. duPont–Columbia University Award in 2019 for an hour-long documentary, "The Everglades: Where Politics, Money and Race Collide".

Current logo for CBS News Miami.

WFOR-TV launched a streaming news service, CBS News Miami (a localized version of the national CBS News streaming service) on January 24, 2022, as part of a rollout of similar services across the CBS-owned stations. The service was originally announced as CBSN Miami, but its launch coincided with the rebranding of the CBSN services under the CBS News name. By February 2023, WFOR rebranded as CBS Miami in conjunction with the CBS News Miami service. WFOR continues to be a solid performer in a close market; in February 2022, it led all English-language TV stations in 11 p.m. news ratings (though far behind WLTV and WSCV). Kim Voet took over as president and general manager of all CBS television operations in Miami in July 2023.

=== Notable on-air staff ===
==== Current staff ====
- Jim Berry, news anchor and former sports director
- Steve Goldstein, sports anchor since 2015 and preseason TV voice of the Miami Dolphins since 2021
- Betty Nguyen, morning news co-anchor

==== Former staff ====
- Jessica Aguirre, reporter
- Susan Barnett, morning news co-anchor
- David Bernard, meteorologist
- Rick Folbaum, news anchor
- Dave Malkoff, reporter
- Antonio Mora, news anchor
- Katie Phang, commentator
- Ken Rosato, news anchor
- Jennifer Santiago, reporter and anchor

== Technical information ==
=== Subchannels ===
WFOR-TV's transmitter is located in Andover, Florida. Its signal is multiplexed:

Subchannels of WFOR-TV
| Subchannel | Res. | Short name | Programming |
|---|---|---|---|
| 4.1 | 1080i | WFOR-TV | CBS |
| 4.2 | 480i | WFORTV2 | Start TV |
| 4.3 | 480i | WFORTV3 | Dabl |
| 4.4 | 480i | WFORTV4 | Outlaw |
| 4.5 | 480i | WFORTV5 | Catchy Comedy |

=== Analog-to-digital conversion ===
WFOR-TV signed on its digital signal on May 1, 2001. The station ended programming on its analog signal, on VHF channel 4, on June 12, 2009, the official date on which full-power television stations in the United States transitioned from analog to digital broadcasts under federal mandate. The station's digital signal continued to broadcast on its pre-transition UHF channel 22, using virtual channel 4.
