= Channel 17 digital TV stations in the United States =

The following television stations broadcast on digital channel 17 in the United States:

- K17BA-D in Yreka, California
- K17BN-D in Needles, California
- K17BV-D in Redwood Falls, Minnesota, on virtual channel 41, which rebroadcasts KPXM-TV
- K17CA-D in Carson City, Nevada
- K17CL-D in Pahrump, Nevada
- K17DA-D in Lake Havasu City, Arizona
- K17DF-D in Crowley Lake, California
- K17DG-D in Rural Summit County, Utah, on virtual channel 11, which rebroadcasts KBYU-TV
- K17DL-D in Branson, Missouri
- K17DM-D in Myton, Utah
- K17DS-D in Clarendon, Texas
- K17DT-D in Elko, Nevada
- K17DU-D in Christmas Valley, Oregon
- K17ED-D in Payette, Idaho
- K17EU-D in Holyoke, Colorado, on virtual channel 47, which rebroadcasts K21NZ-D
- K17EV-D in Omak, Washington
- K17EZ-D in Rogue River, Oregon
- K17FA-D in Willmar, Minnesota, on virtual channel 11, which rebroadcasts KARE
- K17FE-D in Wadena, Minnesota, on virtual channel 42, which rebroadcasts KSAX
- K17FK-D in Montoya & Newkirk, New Mexico
- K17FR-D in Walker Lake, Nevada
- K17GD-D in Paso Robles, California
- K17GE-D in Dove Creek, etc., Colorado, on virtual channel 17, which rebroadcasts K17JJ-D
- K17GJ-D in Twentynine Palms, California
- K17GK-D in Arlington, Oregon
- K17GV-D in Rainier, Oregon, on virtual channel 12, which rebroadcasts KPTV
- K17HA-D in Astoria, Oregon, on virtual channel 8, which rebroadcasts KGW
- K17HB-D in Winnemucca, Nevada
- K17HE-D in Susanville, etc., California
- K17HI-D in Amarillo, Texas
- K17HQ-D in Hatch, Utah
- K17HW-D in Green River, Utah
- K17HX-D in Minersville, Utah
- K17HY-D in Ridgecrest, etc., California, on virtual channel 34, which rebroadcasts KMEX-DT
- K17ID-D in Cherokee & Alva, Oklahoma
- K17IE-D in Navajo Mountain School, Utah
- K17IF-D in Oljeto, Utah
- K17IG-D in Hoehne, Colorado
- K17IH-D in Montezuma Creek-Anet, Utah
- K17II-D in Logan, Utah, on virtual channel 10, which rebroadcasts KULX-CD
- K17IL-D in Ellensburg, etc., Washington
- K17IP-D in Huntsville, etc., Utah, on virtual channel 4, which rebroadcasts KTVX
- K17JA-D in Basalt, Colorado
- K17JC-D in Orderville, Utah
- K17JD-D in Mount Pleasant, Utah, on virtual channel 30, which rebroadcasts KUCW
- K17JE-D in Mayfield, Utah
- K17JF-D in Bluff, etc., Utah
- K17JH-D in Mexican Hat, etc., Utah
- K17JI-D in Fresno, California
- K17JJ-D in Cortez, Colorado
- K17JK-D in Cane Beds, Arizona/Hildale, Utah
- K17JN-D in Enid, Oklahoma
- K17JP-D in Big Timber, etc., Montana
- K17JS-D in Philipsburg, Montana
- K17JW-D in Romeo, Colorado
- K17JZ-D in Bondurant, Wyoming
- K17KB-D in Belgrade, etc., Montana
- K17KC-D in Meeteetse, Wyoming
- K17KF-D in Cambridge, Idaho
- K17KR-D in Winthrop, Washington
- K17KU-D in Saco, Montana
- K17KW-D in Gettysburg, South Dakota
- K17KX-D in Anton, Colorado, on virtual channel 4, which rebroadcasts KCNC-TV
- K17KZ-D in Harlowton, etc., Montana
- K17LM-D in Yuma, Arizona
- K17LP-D in Fruitland, New Mexico
- K17LV-D in Paragould, Arkansas, on virtual channel 8, which rebroadcasts KAIT
- K17MB-D in Circleville, Utah
- K17MH-D in Cedar Falls, Iowa
- K17MI-D in Eads, etc., Colorado
- K17MJ-D in San Antonio, Texas
- K17MK-D in Elk City, Oklahoma
- K17MN-D in Carlsbad, New Mexico
- K17MO-D in Flagstaff, Arizona, on virtual channel 5, which rebroadcasts KPHO-TV
- K17MP-D in Midland, Texas
- K17MQ-D in Thompson Falls, Montana
- K17MS-D in Poplar, Montana
- K17MT-D in Garfield, etc., Utah
- K17MU-D in Rural Sevier County, Utah
- K17MV-D in Richfield, etc., Utah, on virtual channel 9, which rebroadcasts KUEN
- K17MW-D in St. James, Minnesota
- K17MX-D in Frost, Minnesota
- K17MY-D in Jackson, Minnesota
- K17MZ-D in Torrey, Utah
- K17NA-D in Panguitch, Utah
- K17NB-D in Henrieville, Utah
- K17ND-D in Koosharem, Utah
- K17NE-D in Arlee, Montana
- K17NF-D in Brookings, South Dakota
- K17NG-D in Sage Junction, Wyoming
- K17NH-D in Sterling, Colorado, on virtual channel 7, which rebroadcasts KMGH-TV
- K17NI-D in Mesa, Colorado
- K17NJ-D in Rockaway Beach, Oregon, on virtual channel 8, which rebroadcasts KGW
- K17NK-D in Cedar City, Utah, on virtual channel 5, which rebroadcasts KSL-TV
- K17NL-D in Enterprise, Utah
- K17NM-D in Scipio, Utah
- K17NN-D in Leamington, Utah
- K17NP-D in Columbia, etc., Utah
- K17NQ-D in Orangeville, Utah, on virtual channel 5, which rebroadcasts KSL-TV
- K17NS-D in Chloride, Arizona
- K17NT-D in Ely & McGill, Nevada
- K17NU-D in Ruth, Nevada
- K17NV-D in Eureka, Nevada
- K17NW-D in Alexandria, Minnesota
- K17NX-D in Centralia/Chehalis, Washington, on virtual channel 13, which rebroadcasts KCPQ
- K17NY-D in Fruitland, Utah
- K17NZ-D in Bonners Ferry, Idaho
- K17OA-D in Wray, Colorado, on virtual channel 47, which rebroadcasts K21NZ-D
- K17OB-D in Plevna, Montana
- K17OE-D in Colorado Springs, Colorado
- K17OK-D in Snowmass Village, Colorado
- K17OS-D in Laredo, Texas
- K17OV-D in Duluth, Minnesota
- K17OW-D in Hobbs, New Mexico
- K17OX-D in Seward, Alaska
- K17OY-D in Centerville, Washington
- K17PA-D in Mullan, Idaho
- KAAS-TV in Salina, Kansas
- KABH-CD in Bend, Oregon
- KACN-LP in Anchorage, Alaska
- KAJF-LD in Kansas City, Missouri, on virtual channel 21
- KAZQ in Albuquerque, New Mexico
- KBMY in Bismarck, North Dakota
- KBYU-TV in Provo, Utah, on virtual channel 11
- KCRP-CD in Corpus Christi, Texas
- KDIT-CD in Des Moines, Iowa
- KDIT-LD in Fort Dodge, Iowa
- KDSD-TV in Aberdeen, South Dakota
- KDTL-LD in St. Louis, Missouri
- KEEN-CD in Las Vegas, Nevada
- KIDU-LD in Brownwood, Texas
- KISU-TV in Pocatello, Idaho
- KIVY-LD in Crockett, Texas
- KJJC-TV in Great Falls, Montana
- KLBY in Colby, Kansas
- KLDF-CD in Lompoc, California
- KLTS-TV in Shreveport, Louisiana
- KLWB in New Iberia, Louisiana
- KMIZ in Columbia, Missouri
- KMOL-LD in Victoria, Texas
- KMTR in Eugene, Oregon
- KMWE-LD in Saint Cloud, Minnesota, on virtual channel 17
- KNCT in Belton, Texas
- KNSD in San Diego, California, on virtual channel 39
- KNVO in McAllen, Texas
- KODG-LD in Palm Springs, California
- KOOH-LD in Helena, Montana
- KPCB-DT in Snyder, Texas
- KPHO-TV in Phoenix, Arizona, on virtual channel 5
- KPJR-TV in Greeley, Colorado, on virtual channel 38
- KPTS in Wichita, Kansas
- KSBB-CD in Santa Barbara, California, an ATSC 3.0 station.
- KSNF in Joplin, Missouri
- KTEN in Ada, Oklahoma
- KTWO-TV in Casper, Wyoming
- KUAN-LD in Poway, etc., California, uses KNSD's spectrum, on virtual channel 48
- KUTU-CD in Tulsa, Oklahoma
- KVBI-CD in Clarkston, Washington
- KVIA-TV in El Paso, Texas
- KWQC-TV in Davenport, Iowa
- KWSU-TV in Spokane, Washington
- KYNE-TV in Omaha, Nebraska
- KYTL-LD in Twin Falls, Idaho
- W17CT-D in Manteo, North Carolina
- W17DL-D in Toa Baja, Puerto Rico, on virtual channel 17
- W17DO-D in Wilmington, North Carolina
- W17DZ-D in Sister Bay, Wisconsin
- W17EA-D in Arroyo, Puerto Rico
- W17EB-D in Columbus, Ohio, on virtual channel 44
- W17ED-D in Hornell/Alfred, New York
- W17EE-D in Lilesville/Wadesboro, North Carolina
- W17EH-D in Quincy, Illinois
- W17EI-D in Jackson, Tennessee
- W17EM-D in Panama City, Florida
- W17ES-D in Adel, Georgia
- WAAY-TV in Huntsville, Alabama
- WALV-CD in Indianapolis, Indiana, on virtual channel 46
- WBEH-CD in Miami, Florida, on virtual channel 38
- WBME-CD in Milwaukee, Wisconsin, on virtual channel 41
- WBMN-LD in Ocala, Florida
- WBNX-TV in Akron, Ohio, on virtual channel 55
- WBZM-LD in Wilkes-Barre, Pennsylvania
- WCEE-LD in Charlotte, North Carolina
- WCET in Cincinnati, Ohio, on virtual channel 48
- WDTT-LD in Knoxville, Tennessee
- WEAR-TV in Pensacola, Florida
- WEAU in Eau Claire, Wisconsin
- WEIJ-LD in Fort Wayne, Indiana
- WEPH in Tupelo, Mississippi
- WEWA-LD in Wewahitchka, Florida
- WFFC-LD in Midland, Michigan
- WFTS-TV in Tampa, Florida, on virtual channel 28
- WFXU in Live Oak, Florida
- WGAT-LD in Augusta, Georgia
- WGBD-LD in Green Bay, Wisconsin
- WGBP-TV in Opelika, Alabama
- WHNS in Greenville, South Carolina
- WIRS in Yauco, Puerto Rico, uses WVEO's spectrum, on virtual channel 42
- WJMB-CD in Butler, Pennsylvania, on virtual channel 60, which rebroadcasts WOSC-CD
- WJMY-CD in Tuscaloosa, Alabama
- WJVF-LD in Jacksonville, Florida
- WKMU in Murray, Kentucky
- WKOH in Owensboro, Kentucky
- WKSO-TV in Somerset, Kentucky
- WKTD-CD in Portsmouth, Virginia
- WLCF-LD in Decatur, Illinois
- WLWC in New Bedford, Massachusetts, uses WPXQ-TV's spectrum
- WLIG-LD in Plainview, etc., New York
- WMLW-TV in Racine, Wisconsin, uses WBME-CD's spectrum, on virtual channel 49
- WMNN-LD in Lake City, Michigan
- WMWI-LD in Verona, Wisconsin
- WNMF-LD in Morristown, New Jersey, on virtual channel 17
- WOTV in Battle Creek, Michigan
- WPBI-LD in Lafayette, Indiana, on virtual channel 16
- WPFO in Waterville, Maine
- WPHL-TV in Philadelphia, Pennsylvania, on virtual channel 17
- WPXB-LD in Daytona Beach, Florida
- WPXQ-TV at Newport, Rhode Island
- WRAL-TV in Raleigh, North Carolina, on virtual channel 5
- WRTN-LD in Alexandria, Tennessee
- WSYR-TV in Syracuse, New York
- WTAT-TV in Charleston, South Carolina
- WTCN-CD in Palm Beach, Florida
- WTLW-LD in Lima, Ohio
- WUPL in Slidell, Louisiana
- WUVP-DT in Vineland, New Jersey, uses WPHL-TV's spectrum, on virtual channel 65
- WVBG-LD in Greenwich, New York
- WVEO in Aguadilla, Puerto Rico, on virtual channel 17
- WVXF in Charlotte Amalie, U.S. Virgin Islands
- WVVA in Bluefield, West Virginia
- WXMI in Battle Creek, Michigan
- WXVT-LD in Cleveland, Mississippi
- WYIN in Gary, Indiana, on virtual channel 56

The following stations, which are no longer licensed, formerly broadcast on digital channel 17 in the United States:

- K17AF-D in Delta Junction, Alaska
- K17CG-D in Ukiah, California
- K17GC-D in Pitkin, Colorado
- K17LB-D in Perryton, Texas
- K17LN-D in Gold Beach, Oregon
- K17LX-D in Bakersfield, California
- K17ML-D in Red River, New Mexico
- K17OD-D in Silver City, New Mexico
- K41JT-D in Kilauea Military Camp, Hawaii
- KGLU-LD in Ottumwa, Iowa
- KHJL-LD in Rapid City, South Dakota
- KJRW in Eureka, California
- W17EQ-D in Byromville, Georgia
- WDYI-LD in Macon, Georgia
- WNDC-LD in Salisbury, Maryland
- WPGF-LD in Memphis, Tennessee
