= List of television stations in Florida =

This is a list of broadcast television stations that are licensed in the U.S. state of Florida.

== Full-power ==
- Stations are arranged by media market served and channel position.

Full-power television stations in Florida
Media market	Station	Channel	Primary affiliation(s)	Notes	Refs
Fort Myers	WINK-TV	11	CBS, Antenna TV/MyNetworkTV on 11.2		
Fort Myers	WBBH-TV	20	NBC		
Fort Myers	WZVN-TV	26	ABC	(Note: Licensed to Naples, Florida.)	
Fort Myers	WGCU	30	PBS		
Fort Myers	WFTX-TV	36	Fox	(Note: Licensed to Cape Coral, Florida.)	
Fort Myers	WXCW	46	The CW, Univision on 46.3, UniMás on 46.4		
Fort Myers	WRXY-TV	49	CTN	(Note: Licensed to Tice, Florida.)	
Gainesville	WUFT	5	PBS		
Gainesville	WCJB-TV	20	ABC, The CW on 20.2		
Gainesville	WNBW-DT	9	NBC		
Gainesville	WOGX	51	Fox	(Note: Licensed to Ocala, Florida.) (Note: Semi-satellite of WOFL.)	
Gainesville	WGFL	28	CBS, MyNetworkTV on 28.2	(Note: Licensed to High Springs, Florida.)	
Jacksonville	WJXT	4	Independent		
Jacksonville	WJCT	7	PBS		
Jacksonville	WTLV	12	NBC		
Jacksonville	WCWJ	17	The CW		
Jacksonville	WJXX	25	ABC	(Note: Licensed to Orange Park, Florida.)	
Jacksonville	WFOX-TV	30	Fox, MyNetworkTV/MeTV on 30.2, Telemundo on 30.4		
Jacksonville	WJAX-TV	47	CBS		
Jacksonville	WJEB-TV	59	TBN		
Key West	WGEN-TV	8	Estrella TV		
Key West	WSBS-TV	22	Mega TV		
Miami–Fort Lauderdale	WPBT	2	PBS		
Miami–Fort Lauderdale	WFOR-TV	4	CBS		
Miami–Fort Lauderdale	WTVJ	6	NBC		
Miami–Fort Lauderdale	WSVN	7	Fox, ABC on 7.2 and 18.1		
Miami–Fort Lauderdale	WPLG	10	Independent		
Miami–Fort Lauderdale	WLRN-TV	17	PBS		
Miami–Fort Lauderdale	WLTV-DT	23	Univision		
Miami–Fort Lauderdale	WBFS-TV	33	The CW		
Miami–Fort Lauderdale	WPXM-TV	35	Ion Television		
Miami–Fort Lauderdale	WSFL-TV	39	Independent		
Miami–Fort Lauderdale	WHFT-TV	45	TBN		
Miami–Fort Lauderdale	WSCV	51	Telemundo, TeleXitos on 51.2		
Miami–Fort Lauderdale	WBEC-TV	63	Educational independent	(Note: Licensed to Boca Raton, Florida.)	
Miami–Fort Lauderdale	WAMI-DT	69	UniMás	(Note: Licensed to Hollywood, Florida.)	
Orlando	WESH	2	NBC	(Note: Licensed to Daytona Beach, Florida.)	
Orlando	WKMG-TV	6	CBS		
Orlando	WFTV	9	ABC		
Orlando	WDSC-TV	15	Educational independent		
Orlando	WKCF	18	The CW, Estrella TV on 18.3	(Note: Licensed to Clermont, Florida.)	
Orlando	WUCF-TV	24	PBS		
Orlando	WOTF-TV	26	Grit		
Orlando	WRDQ	27	Independent, Telemundo on 31.2		
Orlando	WOFL	35	Fox		
Orlando	WVEN-TV	43	Univision, UniMás on 43.7	(Note: Licensed to Melbourne, Florida.)	
Orlando	WTGL	45	Religious independent	(Note: Licensed to Leesburg, Florida.)	
Orlando	WHLV-TV	52	TBN	(Note: Licensed to Cocoa, Florida.)	
Orlando	WACX	55	Religious independent		
Orlando	WOPX-TV	56	Ion Television		
Orlando	WRBW	65	MyNetworkTV		
Orlando	WEFS	68	Educational independent		
Panama City	WJHG-TV	7	NBC, The CW on 7.2, CBS on 7.3, Ion on 7.4		
Panama City	WMBB	13	ABC		
Panama City	WPGX	28	Fox		
Panama City	WPCT	46	Tourist info	(Note: Licensed to Panama City Beach, Florida.)	
Panama City	WBIF	51	Daystar	(Note: Licensed to Marianna, Florida.)	
Panama City	WFSG	56	PBS	(Note: Satellite of WFSU-TV.)	
Tallahassee	WFSU-TV	11	PBS		
Tallahassee	WTLF	24	The CW		
Tallahassee	WTXL-TV	27	ABC		
Tallahassee	WTWC-TV	40	NBC, Fox on 40.2		
Tallahassee	WFXU	57	MeTV	(Note: Licensed to Live Oak, Florida.)	
Tampa–St. Petersburg	WEDU	3	PBS		
Tampa–St. Petersburg	WEDQ	3.4	PBS		
Tampa–St. Petersburg	WFLA-TV	8	NBC		
Tampa–St. Petersburg	WTSP	10	CBS		
Tampa–St. Petersburg	WTVT	13	Fox		
Tampa–St. Petersburg	WCLF	22	CTN	(Note: Licensed to Clearwater, Florida.)	
Tampa–St. Petersburg	WFTS-TV	28	ABC		
Tampa–St. Petersburg	WMOR-TV	32	Independent	(Note: Licensed to Lakeland, Florida.)	
Tampa–St. Petersburg	WTTA	38	The CW/MyNetworkTV		
Tampa–St. Petersburg	WWSB	40	ABC	(Note: Licensed to Sarasota, Florida.)	
Tampa–St. Petersburg	WTOG	44	Independent		
Tampa–St. Petersburg	WVEA-TV	50	Univision, UniMás on 50.6		
Tampa–St. Petersburg	WFTT-TV	62	Scientology Network	(Note: Licensed to Venice, Florida.)	
Tampa–St. Petersburg	WXPX-TV	66	Independent, Ion Television on 66.2	(Note: Licensed to Bradenton, Florida.)	
West Palm Beach	WPTV-TV	5	NBC		
West Palm Beach	WHDT	9	Independent	(Note: Licensed to Stuart, Florida.)	
West Palm Beach	WPEC	12	CBS		
West Palm Beach	WTCE-TV	21	TBN	(Note: Licensed to Fort Pierce, Florida.)	
West Palm Beach	WPBF	25	ABC	(Note: Licensed to Tequesta, Florida.)	
West Palm Beach	WFLX	29	Fox		
West Palm Beach	WTVX	34	The CW, MyNetworkTV on 34.3		
West Palm Beach	WXEL-TV	42	PBS	(Note: Licensed to Boynton Beach, Florida.)	
West Palm Beach	WFGC	61	CTN	(Note: Licensed to Palm Beach, Florida.)	
West Palm Beach	WPXP-TV	67	Ion Television	(Note: Licensed to Lake Worth, Florida.)	
~Mobile, AL	WEAR-TV	3	ABC, NBC on 3.2	(Note: Licensed to Pensacola, Florida.)	
~Mobile, AL	WSRE	23	PBS		
~Mobile, AL	WHBR	33	CTN		
~Mobile, AL	WFGX	35	MyNetworkTV	(Note: Licensed to Fort Walton Beach, Florida.)	
~Mobile, AL	WJTC	44	Independent		
~Mobile, AL	WFBD	48	TCT	(Note: Licensed to Destin, Florida.)	
~Mobile, AL	WPAN	53	Blab TV		
~Mobile, AL	WAWD	58	Tourist info		

== Low-power ==
Low-power television stations in Florida
Media market	Station	Channel	Network	Notes	Refs
Fort Myers	WHDN-CD	9	NTD America		
Fort Myers	WANA-LD	16	[Blank]		
Fort Myers	WGPS-LD	22	Various		
Fort Myers	WXDT-LD	23	Daystar		
Fort Myers	WWDT-CD	43	Telemundo, TeleXitos on 43.2		
Fort Myers	WLZE-LD	51	Univision, UniMás on 51.2		
Gainesville	WNFT-LD	8	Various		
Gainesville	WRUF-LD	10	Local weather		
Gainesville	WTBZ-LD	14	[Blank]		
Gainesville	WOCX-LD	16	[Blank]	(Note: Licensed to Reddick, Florida.)	
Gainesville	WBMN-LD	17	Various		
Gainesville	W19EX-D	19	Various		
Gainesville	WFGZ-LD	22	Various	(Note: Licensed to Lake City, Florida.)	
Gainesville	WGVT-LD	26	Various		
Gainesville	WOCD-LD	27	[Blank]		
Gainesville	WSHX-LD	29	Univision		
Gainesville	W30EM-D	30	[Blank]		
Gainesville	WTGB-LD	34	Telemundo		
Gainesville	WYME-CD	45	Antenna TV		
Gainesville	WYKE-CD	47	CTN		
Jacksonville	W06DI-D	6	[Blank]	(Note: Licensed to Jasper, Florida.)	
Jacksonville	WJKF-CD	9	Story Television		
Jacksonville	WJXE-LD	10	Various		
Jacksonville	WUJX-LD	18	Quiero TV		
Jacksonville	WKBJ-LD	20	Various		
Jacksonville	WQXT-CD	22	Various	(Note: Licensed to St. Augustine, Florida.)	
Jacksonville	WJVF-LD	23	Various		
Jacksonville	WDVW-LD	26	Various		
Jacksonville	WWRJ-LD	27	Various		
Jacksonville	WUBF-LD	29	Silent		
Jacksonville	WUJF-LD	33	Daystar		
Jacksonville	WODH-LD	34	Various		
Jacksonville	WRCZ-LD	35	Various		
Jacksonville	W30EE-D	39	HSN		
Jacksonville	WBXJ-CD	43	Mariavision		
Jacksonville	WJGV-CD	48	Religious independent	(Note: Licensed to Palatka, Florida.)	
Jacksonville	W32EZ-D	50	Various		
Key West	W22FI-D	3	[Blank]		
Key West	WFIB-LD	6	Silent		
Key West	WFSF-LD	10	Silent		
Key West	W16CL-D	16	[Blank]		
Key West	WEYW-LP	19	Silent		
Key West	W21EK-D	21	[Blank]		
Key West	W25DQ-D	25	Silent		
Key West	WGZT-LD	27	[Blank]		
Key West	WYMI-LD	28	Silent	(Note: Licensed to Summerland Key, Florida.)	
Key West	W29CW-D	29	[Blank]	(Note: Licensed to Duck Key, Florida.)	
Key West	WCAY-CD	35	Tourist info		
Key West	WKWT-LD	42	[Blank]		
Key West	WKIZ-LD	49	[Blank]		
Miami–Fort Lauderdale	WMDF-LD	3	Independent		
Miami–Fort Lauderdale	WTXI-LD	11	Diya TV		
Miami–Fort Lauderdale	WURH-CD	13	WPBT Health Channel (PBS Encore)		
Miami–Fort Lauderdale	WDGT-LD	14	Various		
Miami–Fort Lauderdale	W16CC-D	16	Various	(Note: Licensed to Westgate, Florida.)	
Miami–Fort Lauderdale	W16CA-D	16	Various	(Note: Licensed to Homestead, Florida.)	
Miami–Fort Lauderdale	WDFL-LD	18	Independent on 18.2, ABC on 18.12		
Miami–Fort Lauderdale	WEYS-LD	31	Almavision		
Miami–Fort Lauderdale	WBEH-CD	38	Daystar		
Miami–Fort Lauderdale	WJAN-CD	41	América TeVé		
Miami–Fort Lauderdale	WWSM-LD	43	Religious independent		
Miami–Fort Lauderdale	WLMF-LD	53	América TeVé, Spanish independent on 53.2		
Orlando	WOFT-LD	8	Various		
Orlando	WSWF-LD	10	Various		
Orlando	WOME-LD	11	Infomercials		
Orlando	WDYB-CD	14	Various		
Orlando	WQFT-LD	17	[Blank]		
Orlando	WRCF-CD	29	UniMás		
Orlando	WSCF-LD	30	Mega TV, Independent on 30.2		
Orlando	WTMO-CD	31	Telemundo, TeleXitos on 31.3		
Orlando	W19EM-D	32	TBN		
Orlando	W36EC-D	36	Silent	(Note: Licensed to Bartow, Florida.)	
Orlando	WZXZ-CD	36	Various		
Orlando	WHDO-CD	38	Various		
Orlando	WATV-LD	47	Various		
Orlando	WDTO-LD	50	Daystar		
Orlando	WPXB-LD	50	Daystar		
Orlando	WFEF-LD	50	Various		
Panama City	WGOM-LD	10	[Blank]		
Panama City	W25FK-D	16	[Blank]		
Panama City	W17EM-D	17	[Blank]		
Panama City	WEWA-LD	17	[Blank]	(Note: Licensed to Wewahitchka, Florida.)	
Panama City	WIDM-LD	19	[Blank]		
Panama City	WSDW-LD	20	Univision		
Panama City	WECP-LD	21	CBS, MyNetworkTV on 21.2, Telemundo on 21.5		
Panama City	WPFN-CD	22	Tourist info		
Panama City	WWEO-LD	24	[Blank]	(Note: Licensed to Defuniak Springs, Florida.)	
Panama City	W29FN-D	29	[Blank]		
Panama City	W34FF-D	40	[Blank]		
Tallahassee	W04DX-D	4	Silent		
Tallahassee	W08EQ-D	8	Audio-only independent		
Tallahassee	WTFL-LD	15	Telemundo		
Tallahassee	W14EU-D	20	Independent		
Tallahassee	W28FD-D	28	[Blank]	(Note: Licensed to Greenville, Florida.)	
Tallahassee	W29FO-D	29	[Blank]		
Tallahassee	W35EC-D	35	[Blank]		
Tallahassee	WXTL-LD	36	Univision		
Tallahassee	WVUP-CD	45	CTN		
Tampa–St. Petersburg	W05CO-D	5	3ABN		
Tampa–St. Petersburg	WPDS-LD	14	Educational independent	(Note: Licensed to Largo, Florida.)	
Tampa–St. Petersburg	W31EG-D	15	Various		
Tampa–St. Petersburg	WSVT-LD	18	Daystar		
Tampa–St. Petersburg	WGCT-LD	19	Various		
Tampa–St. Petersburg	WARP-CD	20	Various		
Tampa–St. Petersburg	WXAX-CD	26	Various		
Tampa–St. Petersburg	WTAM-LD	30	Various		
Tampa–St. Petersburg	W32FH-D	33	HSN		
Tampa–St. Petersburg	WSPF-CD	35	TCT		
Tampa–St. Petersburg	WDNP-LD	36	Various		
Tampa–St. Petersburg	WSNN-LD	39	MyNetworkTV		
Tampa–St. Petersburg	W16DQ-D	43	Various		
Tampa–St. Petersburg	WTBT-LD	45	Various		
Tampa–St. Petersburg	WZRA-CD	48	Ethnic independent	(Note: Licensed to Oldsmar, Florida.)	
Tampa–St. Petersburg	WRMD-CD	49	Telemundo, TeleXitos on 49.3		
West Palm Beach	WWCI-CD	10	Various	(Note: Licensed to Vero Beach, Florida.)	
West Palm Beach	W11DH-D	11	[Blank]	(Note: Licensed to Wabasso, Florida.)	
West Palm Beach	W15EO-D	15	Various	(Note: Licensed to Sebastian, Florida.)	
West Palm Beach	W25ER-D	16	[Blank]		
West Palm Beach	WMMF-LD	19	Various		
West Palm Beach	WBWP-LD	19	Various		
West Palm Beach	WXOD-LD	24	Various		
West Palm Beach	WVWW-LD	30	Diya TV		
West Palm Beach	WDOX-LD	32	Various		
West Palm Beach	WSLF-LD	35	Daystar	(Note: Licensed to Port St. Lucie, Florida.)	
West Palm Beach	WTCN-CD	43	MyNetworkTV		
West Palm Beach	WEWF-LD	47	Various	(Note: Licensed to Jupiter, Florida.)	
West Palm Beach	WWHB-CD	48	Roar		
~Mobile, AL	WBQP-CD	12	Various		
~Mobile, AL	W19CO-D	19	HSN		
~Mobile, AL	W27EP-D	27	[Blank]		

== Translators ==
Television station translators in Florida
Media market	Station	Channel	Translating	Notes	Refs
Fort Myers	WUVF-LD	2	WLZE-LD		
Fort Myers	WZDT-LD	39	WXDT-LD		
Gainesville	WKMG-LD	6	WKMG-TV		
Gainesville	WACX-LD	32	WBPI-CD; WACX		
Key West	W12DI-D	8	WGEN-TV		
Key West	W33EP-D	39	WSFL-TV		
Miami–Fort Lauderdale	W18EU-D	8	WGEN-TV		
Miami–Fort Lauderdale	WGEN-LD	8	WGEN-TV		
Miami–Fort Lauderdale	WSBS-CD	22	WSBS-TV		
Miami–Fort Lauderdale	WFUN-LD	48	WJAN-CD		
Orlando	WKME-CD	31	WTMO-CD	(Note: Licensed to Kissimmee, Florida.)	
Orlando	WMVJ-CD	31	WTMO-CD		
Panama City	W27EO-D	27	WTVY		
Tampa–St. Petersburg	W26DP-D	44	WTOG	(Note: Licensed to Inverness, Florida.)	
Tampa–St. Petersburg	W36FJ-D	44	WTOG	(Note: Licensed to Sebring, Florida.)	
Tallahassee	W03CA-D	3	W08EQ-D		
Tallahassee	W23FJ-D	15; 57	WTFL-LD; WFXU	(Note: Licensed to Jennings, Florida.)	
Tallahassee	W35DH-D	35	WCTV		
Tallahassee	WNXG-LD	38	WCTV		
West Palm Beach	W31DC-D	2	WPBT		
~Mobile, AL	W31EP-D	31	WMBP-LD		
~Mobile, AL	WDES-CD	58	WAWD		

== Defunct ==
- WETV Key West (1989–1990)
- WFTL-TV → WGBS-TV Fort Lauderdale, Miami (1953–1957)
- WIRK-TV West Palm Beach (1953–1956)
- WITV Fort Lauderdale (1953–1958)
- WJHP-TV Jacksonville (1953–1957)
- WPFA-TV Pensacola (1953–1955)
- WPST-TV Miami (1957–1961)
- WSUN-TV St. Petersburg (1953–1970)
- WTHS-TV Miami (shared operation with WPBT, 1955–1979)
- WTVI Fort Pierce (1960–1961, 1961–1962)

== See also ==
- Florida § Media
- 1989 South Florida television affiliation switch

== Bibliography ==
- "United States TV Stations: Florida", Yearbook of Radio and Television, New York: Radio Television Daily, 1964, OCLC 7469377 – via Internet Archive
- Gonzalo R. Soruco (1996). Cubans and the Mass Media in South Florida. University Press of Florida. ISBN 978-0-8130-1379-4.
