= Channel 45 virtual TV stations in the United States =

The following television stations operate on virtual channel 45 in the United States:

- K02QP-D in Chowchilla, California
- K14AR-D in Glasgow, Montana
- K14HC-D in Prescott, Arizona
- K14HG-D in Kingman, Arizona
- K15CR-D in Lake Havasu City, Arizona
- K15MB-D in Kansas City, Missouri
- K16BP-D in Cottonwood, Arizona
- K18CB-D in Bullhead City, Arizona
- K20NX-D in Hilo, Hawaii
- K21OB-D in Lake Charles, Louisiana
- K22MJ-D in Hinsdale, Montana
- K22MQ-D in St. James, Minnesota
- K24NR-D in Amarillo, Texas
- K28CW-D in Flagstaff, Arizona
- K29NC-D in Monroe, Louisiana
- K34KZ-D in Hobbs, New Mexico
- K34QB-D in Vail, Colorado
- K36PL-D in Park City, Utah
- K45KS-D in Billings, Montana
- KDHW-CD in Yakima, Washington
- KDIT-CD in Des Moines, Iowa
- KDIT-LD in Fort Dodge, Iowa
- KEDD-LD in Los Angeles, California
- KFTY-LD in Middletown, California
- KOHC-CD in Oklahoma City, Oklahoma
- KQRO-LD in Morgan Hill, California
- KRET-CD in Palm Springs, California
- KRLJ-LD in Joplin, Missouri
- KSHV-TV in Shreveport, Louisiana
- KSKJ-CD in Van Nuys, California
- KURK-LD in Santa Rosa, California/San Francisco, California
- KUTP in Phoenix, Arizona
- KUVI-DT in Bakersfield, California
- KVTX-LD in Victoria, Texas
- KWPL-LD in Santa Fe, New Mexico
- KXCC-LD in Corpus Christi, Texas
- KXLN-DT in Rosenberg, Texas
- W13DP-D in Youngstown, Ohio
- W13DQ-D in Atlanta, Georgia
- W20DF-D in Russellville, Alabama
- W26EY-D in Manteo, North Carolina
- W29FF-D in Atlantic City, New Jersey
- W30EG-D in Knoxville, Tennessee
- W35DW-D in Greenville, North Carolina
- WBFF in Baltimore, Maryland
- WCWN in Schenectady, New York
- WDRN-LD in Fayetteville, North Carolina
- WELL-LD in Philadelphia, Pennsylvania
- WFUP in Vanderbilt, Michigan
- WFWC-CD in Fort Wayne, Indiana
- WGNM in Macon, Georgia
- WHFT-TV in Miami, Florida
- WHWV-LD in Huntington, West Virginia
- WLCF-LD in Decatur, Illinois
- WMCF-TV in Montgomery, Alabama
- WNEO in Alliance, Ohio
- WNLO-CD in Norfolk, Virginia
- WNMF-LD in Morristown, New Jersey
- WODK-LD in St. Louis, Missouri
- WRGT-TV in Dayton, Ohio
- WTBT-LD in Tampa, Florida
- WTCI in Chattanooga, Tennessee
- WTGL in Leesburg, Florida
- WTPM-LD in Mayaguez-Anasco, Puerto Rico
- WVNC-LD in Watertown, New York
- WVUP-CD in Tallahassee, Florida
- WVWW-LD in Vero Beach, Florida
- WWAT-CD in Charleroi, Pennsylvania
- WXLV-TV in Winston-Salem, North Carolina
- WYME-CD in Gainesville, Florida
- WZTD-LD in Richmond, Virginia

The following stations, which are no longer licensed, formerly operated on virtual channel 45:

- K45KX-D in Weed, California
- KCDR-LD in Cedar Rapids, Iowa
- KHPB-CD in Bastrop, Texas
- KLHU-CD in Lake Havasu City, Arizona
- KMDK-LD in Jonesboro, Arkansas
- W45DI-D in Juana Diaz, Puerto Rico
- W45DJ-D in Panama City, Florida
- W45ED-D in Clarksdale, Mississippi
- WKDH in Houston, Mississippi
- WMUN-CD in New York, New York
- WWJS-CD in Clarksville, Indiana
