= KPWT =

KPWT may refer to:

- KPWT-LD, a low-power television station (channel 36, virtual 3) licensed to serve Astoria, Oregon, United States; see List of television stations in Oregon
- KDIT-LD, a low-power televisions station (channel 17, virtual 45) licensed to serve Fort Dodge, Iowa, United States, which held the call sign KPWT-LD in 2021
- KTKX, a radio station (106.7 FM) licensed to Terrell Hills, Texas, United States, which held the call sign KPWT from 2006 to 2010
- Bremerton National Airport (ICAO code KPWT)
