= WVUP =

WVUP may refer to:

- WVUP-CD, a television station in Florida
- West Virginia University at Parkersburg, a college in West Virginia
