= WHBR =

WHBR may refer to:

- WHBR (TV), a television station (channel 34 digital) licensed to Pensacola, Florida, United States
- WHBR-FM, a radio station (103.1 FM) licensed to Parkersburg, West Virginia, United States
