= WTJR =

Television station in Quincy, Illinois

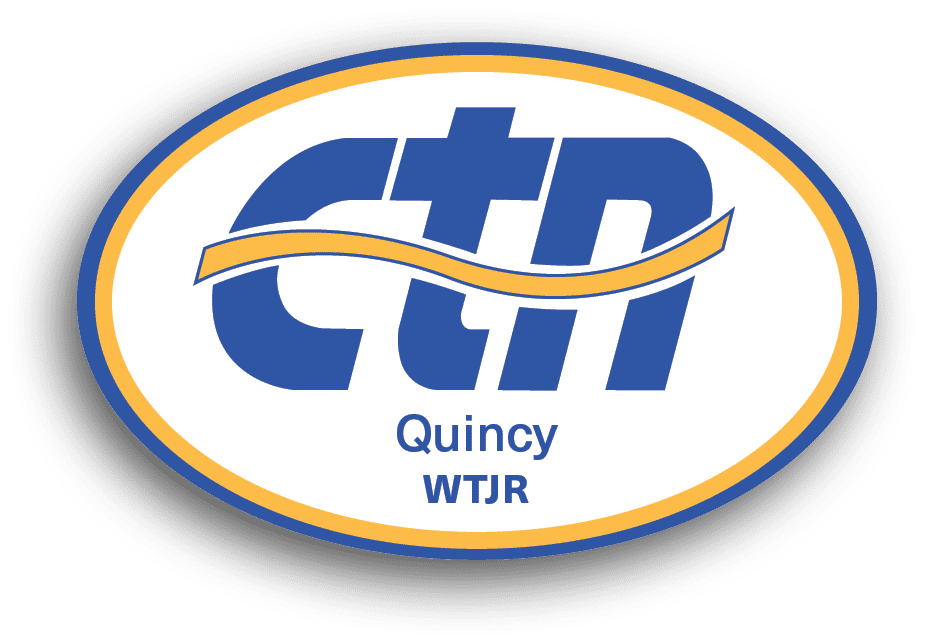
- Quincy, Illinois; Hannibal, Missouri; Keokuk, Iowa; United States
- City: Quincy, Illinois
- Channels: Digital: 32 (UHF); Virtual: 16
- Branding: CTN Quincy

Programming
- Affiliations: 16.1: CTN; for others, see § Subchannels

Ownership
- Owner: Christian Television Network; (Christian Television Network, Inc.)

History
- First air date: January 1, 1986
- Former channel numbers: Analog: 16 (UHF, 1986–2009)
- Call sign meaning: Working Till Jesus Returns

Technical information
- Licensing authority: FCC
- Facility ID: 4593
- ERP: 1,000 kW
- HAAT: 308 m (1,010 ft)
- Transmitter coordinates: 39°58′19.3″N 91°19′40.4″W

Links
- Public license information: Public file; LMS
- Website: www.ctnonline.com/affiliate-stations/ctn-decatur-quincy/

WTJR (channel 16) is a religious television station in Quincy, Illinois, United States, owned by the Christian Television Network (CTN). The station's studios are located on North Sixth Street in downtown Quincy, and its transmitter is located on Cannonball Road northeast of the city. WTJR offers 24-hour religious programming, much of which is produced either locally or at the CTN home base in Clearwater, Florida.

CTN acquired WTJR from another religious broadcaster, locally based Believers Broadcasting Corporation, in May 2006.

== Technical information ==
=== Subchannels ===
The station's signal is multiplexed:

Subchannels of WTJR
Channel	Res.	Short name	Programming
16.1	1080i	WTJR-DT	CTN
16.2	480i	Lifesty	CTN Lifestyle (4:3)
16.3	480i	CTNi	CTN International (4:3)
16.4	480i	N2	Newsmax2 (4:3)
16.5	480i	BIZ-TV	Biz TV

=== Analog-to-digital conversion ===
WTJR shut down its analog signal, over UHF channel 16, on January 20, 2009. The station's digital signal remained on its pre-transition UHF channel 32, using virtual channel 16.
