= WLCN-CD =

Television station in Charleston, South Carolina

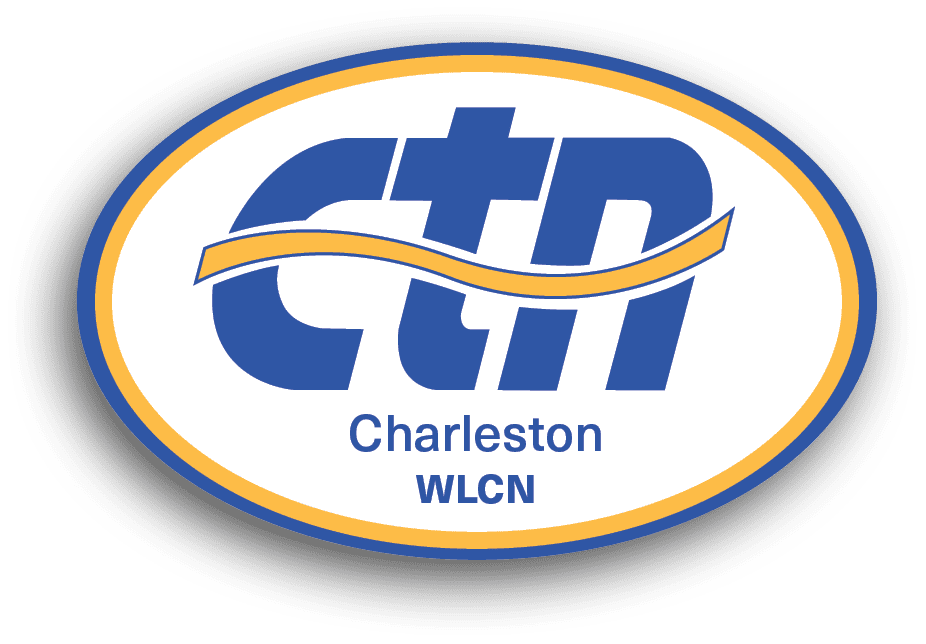
- Charleston, South Carolina; United States
- Channels: Digital: 18 (UHF); Virtual: 18
- Branding: CTN Charleston

Programming
- Affiliations: 18.1: CTN; for others, see § Subchannels

Ownership
- Owner: Christian Television Network; (Christian Television Network of South Carolina, Inc.)

History
- First air date: June 12, 2009
- Former call signs: W18BK (1992–1997); WJRB-LP (1997–January 2009); WLCN-CA (January–July 2009)
- Former channel numbers: Analog: 18 (UHF, 1997–2009)
- Former affiliations: Independent (2009–2011); America One/My Family TV (secondary, 2009–2011)
- Call sign meaning: Lowcountry Community Network (original); "We Love Christ Now" (current)

Technical information
- Licensing authority: FCC
- Facility ID: 55203
- Class: CD
- ERP: 15 kW
- HAAT: 84.2 m (276 ft)
- Transmitter coordinates: 33°1′24.2″N 80°7′22.3″W

Links
- Public license information: Public file; LMS
- Website: ctnonline.com/affiliate/ctn-charleston/

WLCN-CD (channel 18) is a low-power, Class A television station in Charleston, South Carolina, United States, owned by the Christian Television Network (CTN). The station's transmitter is located in Summerville, South Carolina. WLCN-CD offers 24-hour religious programming, much of which is produced either locally or at the CTN home base in Clearwater, Florida.

== History ==
WLCN-CD began broadcasting on June 12, 2009, under the ownership of Jen Rose Broadcasting. The station offered local news, weather, and sports programming along with syndicated programming from America One and My Family TV. After its conversion to digital, the station added Retro TV and Untamed Sports to its subchannels. WLCN produced local shows with emphasis on political, financial and spiritual support, as well as local sports such as South Carolina Stingrays ice hockey and Summerville High School Greenwave football.

On January 23, 2011, the station's previous owners, Faith Assembly of God of Summerville, sold the station to the Christian Television Network. The sale closed on January 23, 2012. Soon afterward, programming on WLCN switched to programming and services similar to other CTN stations.

== Subchannels ==
The station's signal is multiplexed:

Subchannels of WLCN-CD
Subchannel	Res.	Short name	Programming
18.1	720p	WLCN-DT	CTN
18.2	480i	Lifesty	CTN Lifestyle (4:3)
18.3	480i	CTNi	CTN International (4:3)
18.4	480i	N2	Newsmax2 (4:3)
18.5	480i	BIZ-TV	Biz TV (4:3)
