= KNLC =

Television station in St. Louis

- St. Louis, Missouri; United States
- Channels: Digital: 14 (UHF); Virtual: 24
- Branding: MeTV St. Louis

Programming
- Affiliations: 24.1: MeTV; for others, see § Subchannels

Ownership
- Owner: Weigel Broadcasting; (KNLC-TV LLC)

History
- First air date: September 12, 1982
- Former channel numbers: Analog: 24 (UHF, 1982–2009)
- Former affiliations: Religious independent (1982–2017); Fox Kids (secondary, 1995–1996); UPN (secondary, 1999–2000); Secular independent (2017–2018)
- Call sign meaning: New Life Evangelistic Center (founding owner, former lessee of 24.2 subchannel)

Technical information
- Licensing authority: FCC
- Facility ID: 48525
- ERP: 900 kW
- HAAT: 394 m (1,293 ft)
- Transmitter coordinates: 38°21′40″N 90°32′55″W

Links
- Public license information: Public file; LMS
- Website: Weigel site for KNLC

KNLC (channel 24) is a television station in St. Louis, Missouri, United States, which broadcasts the classic television network MeTV. Owned by Weigel Broadcasting, the station maintains a transmitter near Hillsboro-House Springs Road in House Springs, Missouri.

== History ==
Founded by Rev. Larry Rice, head of the New Life Evangelistic Center (NLEC), the station first signed on the air on September 12, 1982, making it the first new television station in the St. Louis market since KDNL-TV (channel 30) signed-on in 1969. Originally, KNLC maintained a schedule consisting entirely of religious programming, which included shows such as The 700 Club and The PTL Club, programs by televangelists Richard Roberts and Jimmy Swaggart, and locally produced religious shows. In September 1984, KNLC transitioned into a hybrid format similar to that offered by the independent stations owned at the time by the Christian Broadcasting Network (CBN), incorporating a selection of secular classic television series featuring sitcoms and westerns from the 1950s and early 1960s, many of which had not been airing in many other U.S. markets.

Unlike most religious/secular independents that aired a single daily block of family-oriented secular programs within their schedules (for example, weekdays from 3 to 7 p.m.), KNLC scheduled its secular shows in a hodgepodge manner in random short-form blocks. It initially carried secular programs from 7 to 7:30 and 9 to 10:30 a.m., 2 to 3 p.m., 5 to 6 p.m. and 9 to 9:30 p.m., with religious shows filling the remaining time slots during its broadcast day between 5 a.m. and 1 a.m. By the late 1980s, the station began mixing its religious and secular shows in a more consistent pattern, and expanded its syndicated offerings with the acquisition of several barter cartoons and (relatively more) recent sitcoms. The daytime schedule from 9 a.m. to 3 p.m. featured a mixed format of secular and religious shows, though cartoons exclusively occupied the 7 to 9 a.m. and 3 to 5 p.m. time periods and classic sitcoms aired from 5 to 7 p.m. In 1986, the New Life Evangelistic Center launched a second religious independent serving the Columbia–Jefferson City market, KNLJ in New Bloomfield; the ministry would sell that station to the Christian Television Network in 2007.

KNLC logo, used from 1982 to 2010.

KNLC was approached by the United Paramount Network (UPN) to become that network's St. Louis charter affiliate in the run-up to its January 1995 debut; however, the station turned its offer down, a move that led to UPN being unavailable over-the-air in the market for its first seven months of operation then beginning a succession of secondary affiliations with other network affiliates in the market, when it affiliated with ABC station KDNL-TV in August 1995. That month, KNLC took over the local programming rights to Fox Kids, after KPLR-TV (channel 11) turned down Fox Kids because the owner felt "they had a strong slate of children's programming and no room for the Rangers". Longtime ABC affiliate KTVI (channel 2)—which switched to Fox on August 7 through an affiliation agreement with New World Communications—opted not to carry Fox's children's program block to accommodate expanded newscasts on weekday mornings, syndicated programming on weekday afternoons, and first-run and off-net syndicated children's programs, infomercials and local real estate programs on weekend mornings; outgoing Fox station KDNL could not retain the block due to the station's newfound programming commitments to ABC. KNLC carried Fox Kids on weekdays from 7 to 8 a.m. and 3 to 5 p.m. as well as on Saturday mornings. The station also acquired more recent first-run and off-network syndicated programs around this time; however, its growth would not last.

While Fox Kids offered the station an opportunity—St. Louis had the largest Fox Kids Club in the country, with 251,000 members—KNLC quickly rankled Fox Kids executives. It did not sell local advertising in Fox Kids programming; instead, it aired public service announcements and Christian ministry messages and even urged kids to write to the governor of Missouri asking for clemency with death row prisoner Johnny Lee Wilson. Fox Kids president Margaret Loesch also privately expressed concerns with Rice's proselytizing in commercial breaks. This prompted Fox executives to shy away from Rice, but even more concerning to viewers was the poor signal of KNLC, even on local cable systems. Crediting an avalanche of mail from the Fox Kids Club with influencing the decision, the network opted to move its children's shows to KTVI beginning in September 1996.

As children's programming on broadcast television had begun to decline and the more popular classic television shows had migrated to cable television, KNLC began to reduce its programming budget for the acquisition of secular shows. Nonetheless, and despite rebuffing prior overtures from the network, KNLC chose to take on a part-time affiliation with UPN in May 1999. It was the first time UPN programs had been seen in St. Louis in 16 months after KDNL-TV dropped its secondary affiliation with the network in January 1998. However, Channel 24 refused to clear as much as 75 percent of UPN's output because of views by management that felt the network's programs and advertisements were offensive. UPN eventually chose to move its programming to WB affiliate KPLR-TV in September 2000; KPLR-TV carried its entire prime time schedule in late night hours. (The network would not have a full-time affiliate in St. Louis until April 2003, when WRBU's home shopping contract ran out.)

KNLC also turned down an offer by Paxson Communications to affiliate KNLC with Pax TV (now Ion Television), after KUMO-LP (channel 51) and its full-power parent station in Mount Vernon, Illinois, WPXS (channel 13), disaffiliated from the network in 2004 (the network would return to KUMO and WPXS in 2005, however it would not be available over-the-air in the market from 2008 to 2013, when Ion affiliated with WRBU following that station's transfer into an Ion-controlled trust company.)

On September 7, 2017, it was announced that KNLC was being sold to Weigel Broadcasting for $3.75 million; Weigel would convert KNLC to a secular independent station. The sale was completed on December 14, 2017. New Life retains control of one subchannel to carry their programming, on KNLC-DT2, known as "NLEC TV."

On February 1, 2018, MeTV moved from KMOV 4.2 to KNLC 24.1. This provided an HD feed over the air and also brought MeTV to satellite providers Dish Network and DirecTV for the first time in the St. Louis market.

=== KNLC-DT2 ===
Former logo for DT2 subchannel

KNLC launched a digital subchannel on virtual channel 24.2 on February 4, 2009, when it began carrying Renewable Energy Satellite (RES), a 24-hour channel consisting of programs discussing various renewable energy methods. The subchannel was operated by Missouri Renewable Energy (MORE), a non-profit environmental advocacy group associated with the New Life Evangelistic Center.

In May 2024, NLEC TV began airing announcements indicating that its over-the-air coverage on 24.2 would be ending June 24, the day before Weigel launched MeTV Toons, a new network dedicated to classic cartoons. NLEC has indicated plans to continue its programming through its online feed.

== Programming ==
Prior to Weigel's purchase, KNLC's programming schedule had consisted mostly of religious shows produced for local broadcast and syndication and provided by the Here's Help Network (such as Ed Hindson), along with a mix of public domain classic television shows and movies. As ownership transitioned, NLEC programming moved from 24.1 and displaced Renewable Energy Satellite on 24.2 (RES programming continued on 24.2 during the overnight hours). Weigel put Heroes & Icons onto both 24.1 and 24.3. Subchannel 24.4 carries the Movies! network and 24.5 carries Catchy Comedy. The remaining syndication contracts were nullified on February 1, 2018, upon MeTV's move to KNLC's main channel, due to a non-compete clause that NLEC agreed upon as a condition of maintaining its subchannel. With Weigel taking the subchannel back from NLEC in 2024, the online version of the channel will resume carrying some of the classic sitcoms and westerns it could not carry due to that non-compete clause.

== Technical information ==
=== Subchannels ===
The station's signal is multiplexed:

Subchannels of KNLC
Subchannel	Res.	Short name	Programming
24.1	720p	MeTV	MeTV
24.2	480i	TOONS	MeTV Toons
24.3	480i	HEROES	Heroes & Icons
24.4	480i	MOVIES	Movies!
24.5	480i	CATCHY	Catchy Comedy
24.6	480i	START	Start TV
24.7	480i	WEST	WEST
24.8	480i	STORY	Story Television
24.9	480i	DABL	Dabl
24.10	480i	MeTV+	MeTV+

=== Analog-to-digital conversion ===
KNLC shut down its analog signal, over UHF channel 24, on January 19, 2009, just over five months before the federally mandated June 12 transition to digital broadcasts for full-power television stations in the U.S. The station terminated its analog signal earlier than intended to accommodate the transition of CBS affiliate KMOV (channel 4)'s digital signal from its original assignment on UHF channel 56—an allocation that was among the higher tier of channels on that broadcast band (52–69) designated for decommission from broadcasting use—to a permanent allocation on UHF channel 24. The station's digital signal continued to broadcasts from its pre-transition UHF channel 14, using virtual channel 24.

In concurrence with the conversion arrangements, KNLC's then-owner New Life Evangelistic Center partnered with KMOV to raise funds to purchase digital converter boxes for viewers living in low-income households around their shared viewing area.
