= KWHS-LD =

Television station in Colorado Springs, Colorado

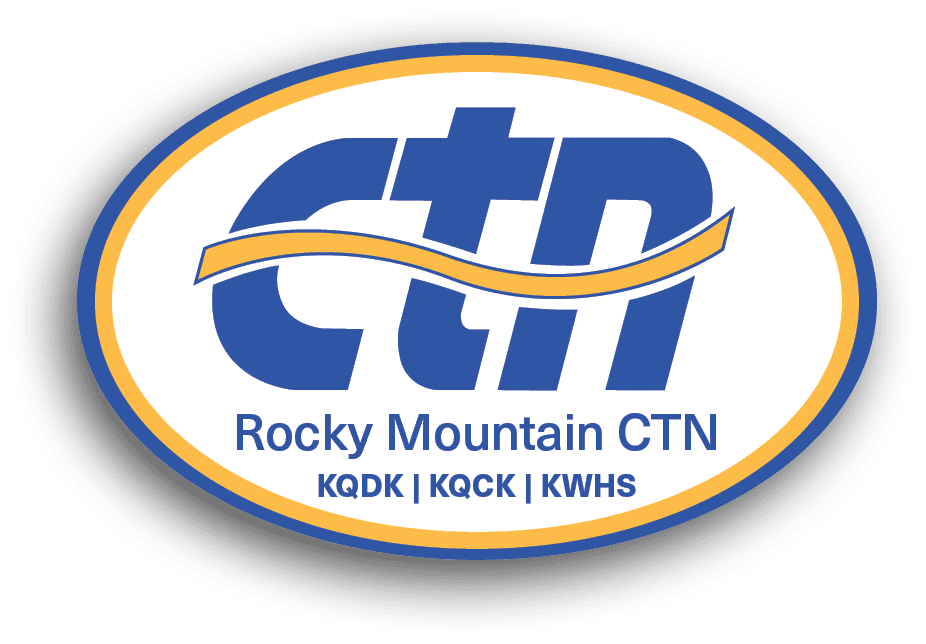

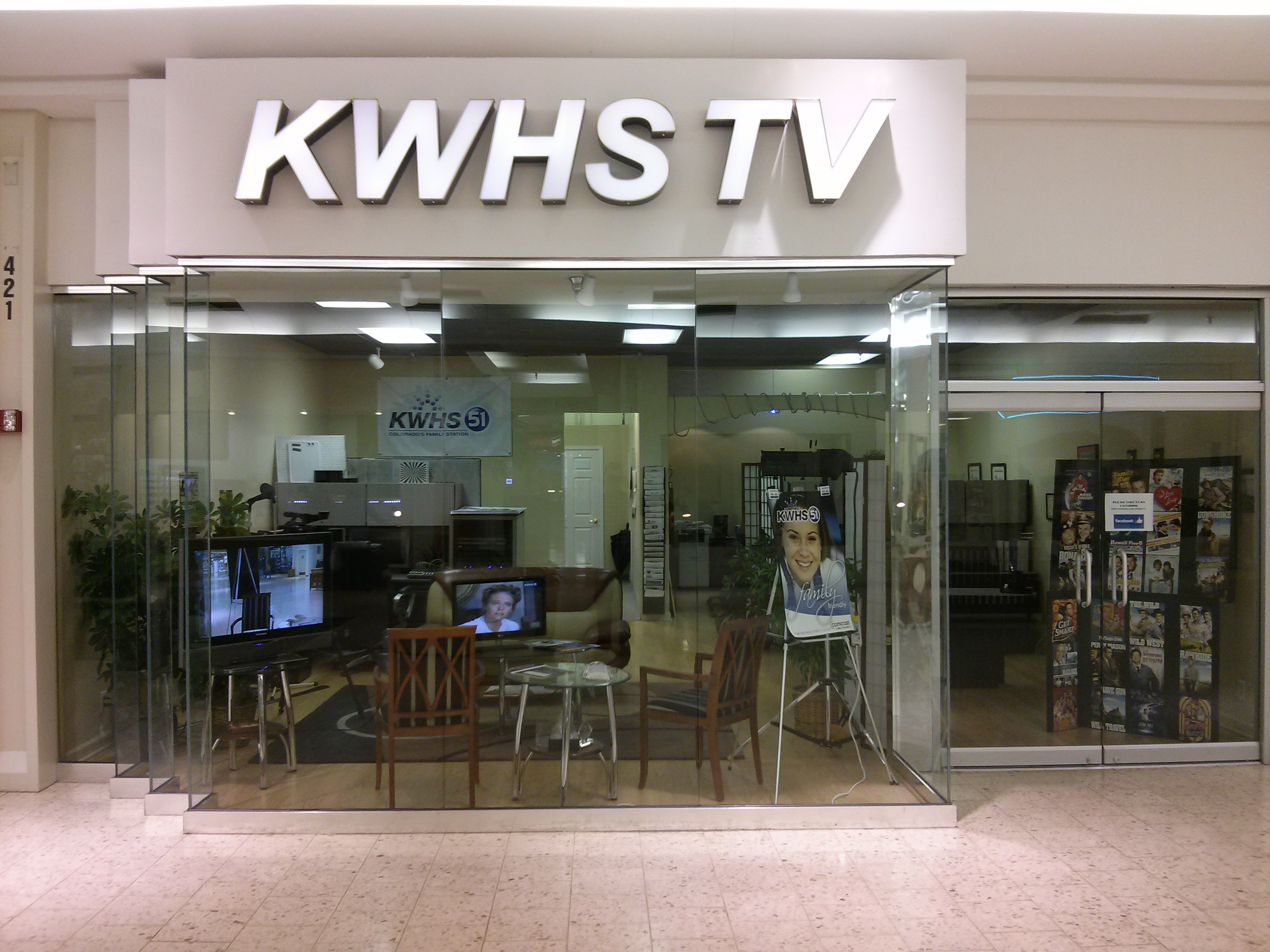
- Station's studio/office within Chapel Hills Mall
- Colorado Springs, Colorado; United States
- Channels: Digital: 10 (VHF); Virtual: 51
- Branding: Rocky Mountain CTN

Programming
- Affiliations: 51.1: CTN; 51.3: CTN International

Ownership
- Owner: Christian Television Network; (Christian Television Corporation, Inc.)
- Sister stations: KQDK-CD, KQCK

History
- First air date: 1992
- Former call signs: K51CE (1991–1996); KWHS-LP (1996–2011)
- Former channel numbers: Analog: 51 (UHF, 1995–2011); Digital: 51 (UHF, 2011–2019)
- Former affiliations: LeSEA (1992–2018)
- Call sign meaning: "World Harvest Southern Colorado"

Technical information
- Licensing authority: FCC
- Facility ID: 74501
- Class: LD
- ERP: 3 kW
- HAAT: 654.4 m (2,147 ft)
- Transmitter coordinates: 38°44′41.9″N 104°51′39.4″W

Links
- Public license information: LMS
- Website: www.ctnonline.com/affiliate-stations/ctn-rocky-mountain/

KWHS-LD (channel 51) is a low-power religious television station in Colorado Springs, Colorado, United States, owned by the Christian Television Network (CTN). The station's transmitter is located atop Cheyenne Mountain.

== History ==
The station, which signed on the air in 1992 and maintains a studio in Colorado Springs, was previously a semi-satellite of KWHD in Denver, owned by LeSEA Broadcasting (now Family Broadcasting Corporation). Both outlets shared the same programming with some exceptions. (KWHD is now KETD, carrying Estrella TV; the station does still operate a subchannel carrying a schedule of religious programming that remained identical to that of KWHS until 2018.)

In June 2014, it was announced LeSEA had inked an affiliation deal with Cozi TV, KWHS-LD was one of the stations that began carrying the channel. On July 1, 2017, Light TV replaced Cozi TV on KWHS-LD's subchannel.

On February 5, 2018, it was announced that LeSEA would sell KWHS-LD, along with Class A station KEEN-CD in Las Vegas and full-power station WHNO in New Orleans, to Clearwater, Florida–based Christian Television Network for $5.7 million. The sale was completed on April 23, 2018.

== Technical information ==
=== Subchannels ===
The station's signal is multiplexed:

Subchannels of KWHS-LD
Subchannel	Res.	Short name	Programming
51.1	1080i	KWHS-HD	CTN
51.3	480i	CTNi	CTN International (4:3)
