= KFDR =

Television station in Jefferson City, Missouri

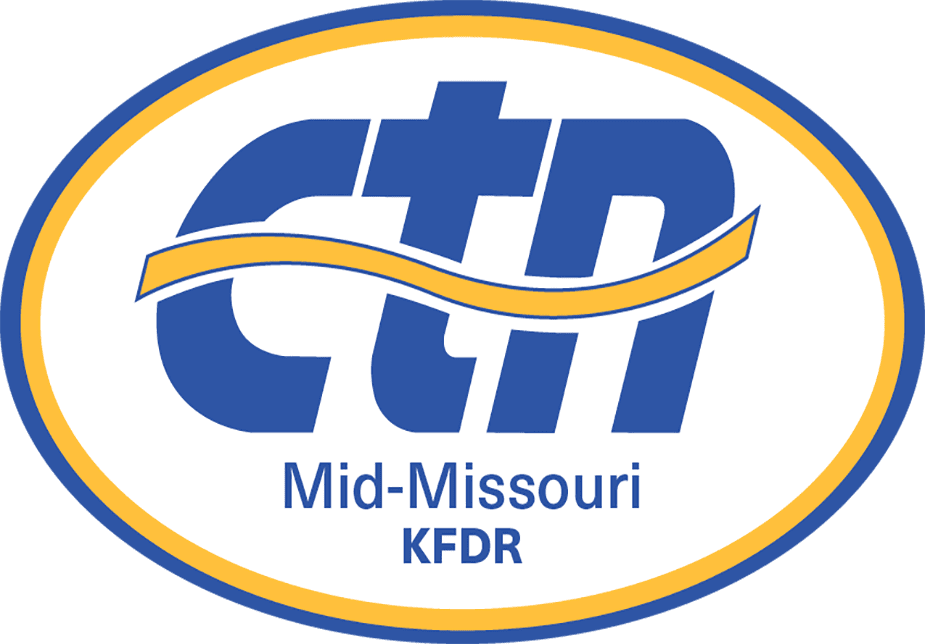
- Jefferson City–Columbia, Missouri; United States
- City: Jefferson City, Missouri
- Channels: Digital: 20 (UHF); Virtual: 25
- Branding: CTN Mid-Missouri

Programming
- Affiliations: 25.1: CTN; for others, see § Subchannels

Ownership
- Owner: Christian Television Network, Inc.

History
- First air date: March 30, 1986
- Former call signs: KNLJ (1984–2023)
- Former channel numbers: Analog: 25 (UHF, 1986–2009)
- Former affiliations: Religious Ind. (1986–2007)

Technical information
- Licensing authority: FCC
- Facility ID: 48521
- ERP: 1,000 kW
- HAAT: 316 m (1,037 ft)
- Transmitter coordinates: 38°42′15″N 92°5′22″W

Links
- Public license information: Public file; LMS
- Website: ctnonline.com/affiliate/kfdr/

KFDR (channel 25) is a religious television station licensed to Jefferson City, Missouri, United States, serving the Columbia–Jefferson City market. The station is owned by the Christian Television Network (CTN). KFDR's transmitter is located near New Bloomfield, Missouri.

== History ==
The station (originally KNLJ) first signed an agreement on Easter Sunday in 1986 at 3 p.m. to be a sister station and simulcast to KNLC in St. Louis; at that time, both stations were owned by Reverend Larry Rice's ministry, the New Life Evangelistic Center.

In September 1986, KNLJ broke away from KNLC while it was still running most of the same Christian programs (such as The 700 Club, Richard Roberts, Jerry Falwell, among others) as well as locally produced programs from the ministry. They ran syndicated cartoons, some classic sitcoms, westerns, and outdoor sporting programs about 12 hours a day. In 1990, KNLJ affiliated with Fox Kids and also ran The Disney Afternoon. When Mid-Missouri got its own Fox affiliate a few years later, the Fox Kids block moved there. As the 1990s progressed, the secular shows were becoming much cheaper.

In mid-2007, the station was sold to the Christian Television Network with the New Life Evangelistic Center retaining KNLC. Both secular and Christian programming was dropped in favor of simulcasting the Christian Television Network full-time. Religious groups had previously bought time on both CTN and KNLJ.

On March 13, 2023, the station changed its call sign to KFDR, in accordance with the approval from the Federal Communications Commission (FCC).

== Technical information ==
=== Subchannels ===
The station's signal is multiplexed:

Subchannels of KFDR
Channel	Res.	Short name	Programming
25.1	1080i	KFDR-HD	CTN
25.2	480i	Lifesty	CTN Lifestyle (4:3)
25.3	480i	CTNi	CTN International (4:3)
25.4	480i	N2	Newsmax2 (4:3)
25.5	480i	BIZ-TV	Biz TV

=== Analog-to-digital conversion ===
KNLJ shut down its analog signal, over UHF channel 25, on June 12, 2009, the official date on which full-power television stations in the United States transitioned from analog to digital broadcasts under federal mandate. The station's digital signal remained on its pre-transition UHF channel 20, using virtual channel 25.
