= Joy Junction =

American children's television show

- Genre: Children's; Christian
- Created by: Don MacAllister
- Country of origin: United States
- Original language: English
- No. of episodes: At least 39 (known)

Production
- Running time: 30 minutes

Original release
- Network: WCLF
- Release: November 10, 1979 – January 1, 2005

Joy Junction is an American Christian children's television series produced by and initially broadcast on WCLF in Clearwater, Florida, beginning in 1979. Episodes were also aired on the Trinity Broadcasting Network (worldwide) and FamilyNet, among others. New episodes were still being produced as of 1990 and the show was still being broadcast as late as 2005.

The theme song is a variation of Three Dog Night's hit song "Joy to the World".

The series would become infamous when, in 2012, cast member Ronald William Brown was arrested and later sentenced to 20 years in prison for possession of child pornography and conspiracy to kidnap a child. As a result, others involved in the show would subsequently cease broadcasting and remove all official sources of information on the show. While VHS recordings of clips/episodes have surfaced on the internet, a large part of the show is now considered lost media.

== Summary ==
In the show, a cast of characters led by Sheriff Don (played by Don MacAllister) would teach children manners, values, ethics and Biblical history. It was targeted at children age 4 (despite the TV rating for the show, in later years, being TV-Y7) to 13 years of age. Joy Junction encouraged children to write in weekly to receive Bible lessons and games.

It also featured episodes of the animated cartoon series Jot.

== Cast ==
- Don MacAllister as Sheriff Don, the show emcee and referee for the games.
- Forrest Padley as Professor Klodhopper, an absent-minded professor who is lovable but not practical. He often brings a kooky invention to demonstrate, with scattered results.
- David Brantley as Whittler Dan, a kind-hearted farmer who enjoys telling stories. He has a cousin, Jungle Bob, who is identical to Dan, but British and wears a monocle, pith helmet, and a Dr. Livingston getup.
- Ronald William Brown as Ron and Marty, two friends. Marty (a ventriloquist dummy) is an elementary-aged boy who always brings up a problem he is having in his daily life (peer pressure and bullying as examples), and Ron gives him advice on how to deal with the problem in a Christian way.
- Les Padley as Deputy Les, Sheriff Don's assistant. He appears as an occasional supporting character and assists setting up the games.
- Al DiSanto as Papillon, the resident artist. He creates sketches on a large drawing board, which are relevant to the day's lesson. Despite his French name and yellow beret, he talks with a noticeable Brooklyn accent.

The position of soloist alternated between Sarah Edens and Darsi Wilson.

== Controversy ==
The show became controversial in the early 2010s, years after it was last broadcast, when it was discovered that a prominent cast member, Ronald William Brown (1955–2020), possessed child pornography and photographs of dead children, and had expressed a desire to rape and cannibalize young boys.

Brown's character on the show was a ventriloquist with a dummy named Marty. The pair taught children lessons about right and wrong, including about the dangers of "pornography" and "evil thoughts". In doing so, Brown often interacted with children on set.

Brown first drew police attention in 1998, when boys' underwear was found in his possession. However, he was let go after claiming they were for his puppet. In 2012, Brown was arrested and subsequently sentenced to 20 years in prison for possession of child pornography and conspiracy to kidnap a child after police discovered messages on a dark web chatroom detailing this. Brown died on August 5, 2020, aged 65, due to motor neuron disease.

Little information of the show is available from official sources, though selected clips/episodes have resurfaced online in the 2020s.
