= WYKE-CD =

Television station in Inglis–Yankeetown, Florida

Translator of WCLF, Clearwater, Florida
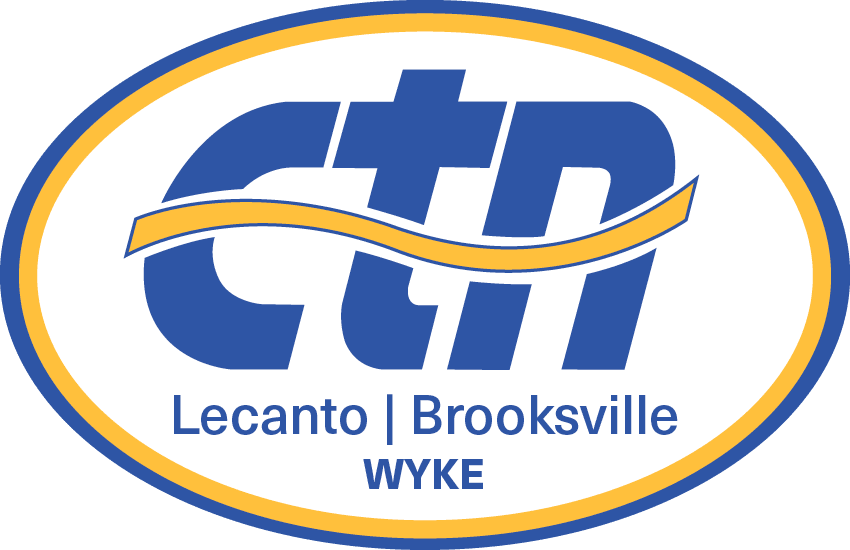
- Inglis–Yankeetown–Lecanto, Florida; United States
- City: Inglis–Yankeetown, Florida
- Channels: Digital: 24 (UHF); Virtual: 47
- Branding: CTN Yankeetown–Brooksville

Programming
- Affiliations: 47.1: CTN; for others, see § Subchannels

Ownership
- Owner: Christian Television Network; (Christian Television Corporation, Inc.)

History
- Founded: June 16, 1982
- Former call signs: W49AI (1982–1995); WYKE-LP (1995–2009)
- Former channel numbers: Analog: 49 (UHF, 1982–February 2005), 47 (UHF, February−March 2005); Digital: 47 (UHF, 2005−2020)
- Former affiliations: As WOFL repeater: Independent (1982−1986); Fox (1986−1991); As stand-alone station: Channel America (1991−1995); America One (1995−2015); YTA TV (2015–2022); Faith TV (1991−2008); My Family TV (secondary, 2008−2014); Religious (WACX) (secondary, 2017−2019)
- Call sign meaning: Dual meaning: "We're Your Key Training Center" (reference to the Key Training Center, former owner and licensee) or Yankeetown, FL (city of license)

Technical information
- Licensing authority: FCC
- Facility ID: 63901
- Class: CD
- ERP: 15 kW
- HAAT: 87.8 m (288 ft)
- Transmitter coordinates: 28°53′2.2″N 82°31′20.1″W

Links
- Public license information: Public file; LMS
- Website: www.ctnonline.com/wyke-tv.html

WYKE-CD (channel 47) is a low-power, Class A television station licensed to both Inglis and Yankeetown, Florida, United States, two cities in Levy County—part of the Gainesville market—but serving Citrus County, part of the Tampa Bay market. It is a translator of Clearwater-based WCLF (channel 22), the flagship station of the Christian Television Network (CTN).

== History ==
The station was founded in 1982 as W49AI (channel 49). It was owned by the Citrus County Association for Retarded Citizens, a non-profit organization that assists handicapped and disabled people in Citrus County. The station repeated the TV signal of Orlando's WOFL, with some shows replaced with local programming. However, it did not carry WOFL's late-night programming, as it left the air around midnight. W49AI became a Fox affiliate when WOFL did in 1986.

W49AI dropped Fox and WOFL around 1991 when Ocala's WOGX affiliated with the Fox network. At that point, it offered more local programming, plus shows from other satellite networks, like Channel America, America One (later Youtoo America, now YTA TV), and My Family TV. WYKE has also aired religious programming from Faith TV and Orlando independent station WACX.

In May 1995, W49AI became WYKE-LP, named after the Key Training Center in Lecanto, where Citrus County's handicapped learn basic occupational skills for employment.

On February 9, 2005, WYKE relocated to channel 47 and became a Class A station (though they kept the "-LP" suffix). Soon after, on March 21, the station completed a flash-cut to digital, becoming one of the first licensed digital Class A stations in the United States. However, the station would not adopt a "-CD" suffix until 2009.

On December 10, 2021, it was announced that CTN would purchase WYKE-CD for $1 million; the sale was completed on March 15, 2022.

== News operation ==
WYKE aired a half-hour morning show called Citrus Today, hosted by Dennis Miller. Originally called Citrus Sunrise, the show aired weekdays at 9:30 a.m. and featured local news and public affairs segments.

In the past, the station has aired simulcasts of Gainesville ABC affiliate WCJB's morning, evening, and late newscasts.

== Subchannels ==
The station's signal is multiplexed:

Subchannels of WYKE-CD
Channel	Res.	Short name	Programming
47.1	1080i	WYKE	CTN
47.3	480i	CTNi	CTN International (4:3)
47.5	480i	BIZ-TV	Biz TV (4:3)
