= WVLR (TV) =

Television station in Tazewell, Tennessee

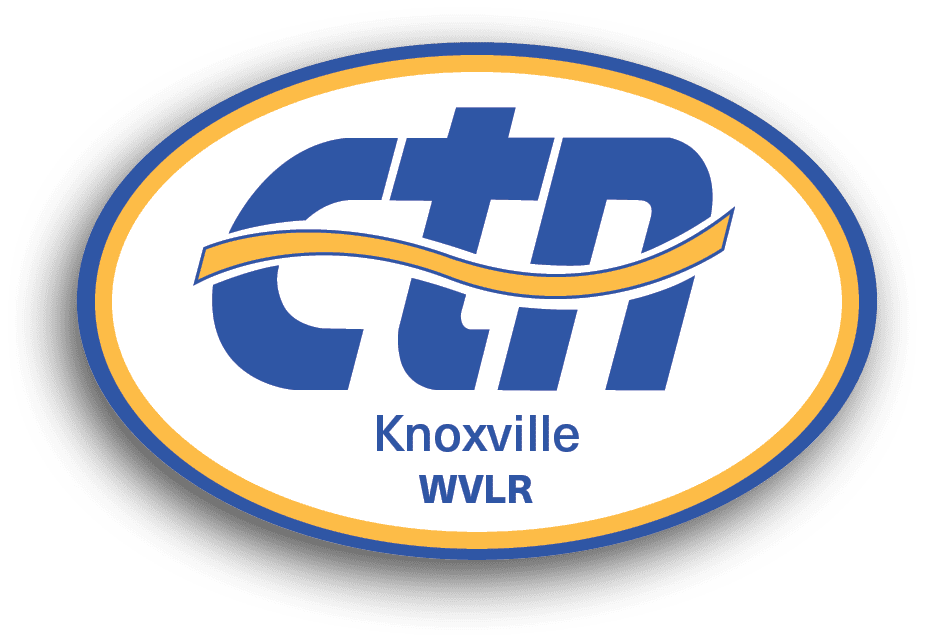
- Tazewell–Knoxville, Tennessee; United States
- City: Tazewell, Tennessee
- Channels: Digital: 36 (UHF); Virtual: 48
- Branding: CTN Knoxville

Programming
- Affiliations: 48.1: CTN; for others, see § Subchannels

Ownership
- Owner: Christian Television Network; (Volunteer Christian Television, Inc.)

History
- First air date: October 6, 2002
- Former channel numbers: Analog: 48 (UHF, 2002–2009); Digital: 48 (UHF, 2009–2020)
- Call sign meaning: Volunteer Christian Television

Technical information
- Licensing authority: FCC
- Facility ID: 81750
- ERP: 798 kW
- HAAT: 430 m (1,411 ft)
- Transmitter coordinates: 36°15′30.3″N 83°37′42.6″W

Links
- Public license information: Public file; LMS
- Website: ctnonline.com/affiliate/wvlr-tv/

WVLR (channel 48) is a religious television station licensed to Tazewell, Tennessee, United States, serving the Knoxville area. The station is owned by the Christian Television Network (CTN). WVLR's studios are located on Kyker Ferry Road in Kodak, and its transmitter is located on Clinch Mountain near Powder Springs in unincorporated Grainger County.

== History ==
The station signed on October 6, 2002; it was added to East Tennessee cable systems in early 2003.

== Technical information ==
=== Subchannels ===
The station's signal is multiplexed:

Subchannels of WVLR
Subchannel	Res.	Short name	Programming
48.1	1080i	WVLR-HD	CTN
48.3	480i	CTNi	CTN International (4:3)
48.4	480i	BUZZR	Buzzr (4:3)
48.5	480i	BIZ-TV	Biz TV

=== Analog-to-digital conversion ===
WVLR shut down its analog signal, over UHF channel 48, on June 12, 2009, the official date on which full-power television stations in the United States transitioned from analog to digital broadcasts under federal mandate. The station "flash-cut" its digital signal into operation on UHF channel 48. Because it was granted an original construction permit after the FCC finalized the DTV allotment plan on April 21, 1997, WVLR did not receive a companion channel for a digital television station.
