= WHNO =

Television station in New Orleans

- New Orleans, Louisiana; United States
- Channels: Digital: 21 (UHF); Virtual: 20
- Branding: CTN Louisiana

Programming
- Affiliations: 20.1: CTN; for others, see § Subchannels

Ownership
- Owner: Christian Television Network; (Christian Television Corporation of New Orleans, Inc.)

History
- First air date: October 20, 1994
- Former channel number: Analog: 20 (UHF, 1994–2009)
- Former affiliations: LeSEA (primary, 1994–2018); CBS (secondary, 1998–2002)
- Call sign meaning: World Harvest New Orleans

Technical information
- Licensing authority: FCC
- Facility ID: 37106
- ERP: 300 kW
- HAAT: 254 m (833 ft)
- Transmitter coordinates: 29°55′13.1″N 90°1′28.6″W

Links
- Public license information: Public file; LMS
- Website: WHNO page on CTN website

WHNO (channel 20) is a religious television station in New Orleans, Louisiana, United States, owned by the Christian Television Network (CTN). The station's studios are located on St. Charles Avenue in downtown New Orleans, and its transmitter is located off Behrman Highway in the city's Algiers neighborhood.

== Prior history of UHF channel 20 in New Orleans ==
The UHF channel 20 allocation in the New Orleans market was originally occupied by WJMR-TV (now Fox affiliate WVUE), a primary CBS and secondary ABC affiliate which moved to that channel from UHF channel 61 on July 20, 1955. That station changed its channel allocation two more times—first to VHF channel 13 on January 13, 1959 (less than one month before it adopted the WVUE call letters) and then to channel 12 on September 6, 1962 (due to interference with Biloxi, Mississippi, station WLOX on channel 13)—before settling on channel 8 on June 8, 1970.

== History ==
The construction permit for UHF channel 20 that bore WHNO dates to 1988 and was filed by Tucker Broadcasting Company, Limited Partnership. Tucker was not the original winner in comparative hearing. An FCC law judge found in favor of Delta Broadcasting Company, a competing applicant headed by market veteran John G. Curren, in 1990; the FCC review board proposed granting the station to another aspiring owner, Swan Broadcasting. In 1991, LeSEA Broadcasting (now Family Broadcasting Corporation) purchased the construction permit with the intent to sign on a station in the market on channel 20.

The station first signed on the air on October 20, 1994; the station carried a mix of Christian-targeted programs, family-oriented syndicated programs and movies. As in other markets where LeSEA owned stations, WHNO opted against taking an affiliation with the United Paramount Network (UPN) prior to the network's January 16, 1995, launch as the programming planned for the network conflicted with the company's core programming values; the affiliation instead went to upstart station WUPL (channel 54), which launched in June 1995.

In September 1995, channel 20 began carrying the (first incarnation of the) CBS morning program CBS This Morning; the station then carried its successor morning show, The Early Show, from that program's debut in 1999 until 2002, when the program moved to WUPL. Much like with WUPL today, WHNO carried the programs as WWL-TV (channel 4) had long carried a weekday morning newscast that runs into the 7–9 a.m. timeslot occupied by the network's morning programs in most other markets. In 2000, WHNO began to air Christian-targeted paid programming in some off-peak hours.

When Hurricane Katrina struck the New Orleans area on August 29, 2005, the storm's flooding and damaging winds caused extensive damage to WHNO's Behrman Highway studios. The station ceased over-the-air broadcasts due to transmitter problems related to the storm. LeSEA provided a direct feed of its national World Harvest Television service to New Orleans area cable and satellite providers (including the market's largest, Cox Communications). Channel 20 returned to the air that November, carrying WHT programming. This lasted until December 3, 2005, when WHNO resumed its regular locally based program schedule and began providing local advertising once again.

LeSEA president Peter Sumrall (the son of late founder Dr. Lester Sumrall) appointed veteran television and cable manager Dean Powery to become WHNO's general manager in May 2007. Under Powery, the station increased its staff and upgraded its programming from its post-Katrina low to turn it into a more competitive station in the New Orleans market; Powery also reconnected with local ministries, added newer syndicated programming and local college football games to WHNO's schedule and expanded the station's production capabilities. In 2011, LeSEA Broadcasting acquired the locally based independent sports website SportsNOLA.com from NewOrleans.com.

On February 5, 2018, it was announced that LeSEA would sell WHNO and two low-power stations in Las Vegas and Colorado Springs to Clearwater, Florida–based Christian Television Network for $5.7 million. The sale was completed on April 23, 2018.

Former WHNO logo, used from 2003 to 2008

Final WHNO logo under LeSEA ownership, used until 2018

== Programming ==
As a CTN station, WHNO offers a mix of local and national Christian ministry programs.

=== Sports programming ===
WHNO carried the only televised game of the short-lived springtime Regional Football League: the New Orleans Thunder–Mobile Admirals contest in Mobile, Alabama, on May 8, 1999. The league lasted only one season.

In 2010, WHNO hired veteran sports journalist and personality Ken Berthelot to expand the station's sports programming. With over 40 years of experience in sports, Berthelot quickly put together a five-hour sports programming block that aired on Monday through Friday nights, which covered college and local high school sports. In September 2012, Berthelot expanded WHNO's sports block to ten hours a week (running weeknights from 5 to 7 p.m.) to counterprogram and compete against the local news programming on WWL-TV, WVUE, NBC affiliate WDSU (channel 6) and ABC affiliate WGNO (channel 26).

On August 24, 2011, general manager Dean Powery oversaw the acquisition of SportsNOLA.com, an acquisition that added veteran sports journalist Ken Trahan and more than 20 local sports contributors. In 2012, WHNO began airing high school football, baseball and basketball games again for the first time since Hurricane Katrina. WHNO became an affiliate of the Southland Conference Television Network in September 2012, carrying sporting events from the conference's universities including games from nearby Southeastern Louisiana University and Nicholls State University. The Southland Conference Television Network dissolved on July 1, 2015.

== Technical information ==
=== Subchannels ===
The station's signal is multiplexed:

Subchannels of WHNO
Subchannel	Res.	Short name	Programming
20.1	1080i	WHNO-HD	CTN
20.2	480i	N2	Newsmax2 (4:3)
20.3	480i	CTNi	CTN International (4:3)
20.4	480i	BUZZR	Buzzr
20.5	480i	Biz-TV	Biz TV

After the digital transition, WHNO began to multiplex its digital signal. In 2009, WHNO began carrying the LeSEA-owned World Harvest Television service on digital subchannel 20.2. In 2013, the station added WeatherNation TV on its second digital subchannel, followed by the addition of Cozi TV and a third digital subchannel, LeSEA's World Harvest Television, in August 2014. In September 2015, WHNO-D1 began broadcasting in 1080i high-definition on 20.1. Soon after, WHNO dropped one of the three subchannels, World Harvest Television, from channel 20.3. WeatherNation TV subsequently moved from channel 20.4 to 20.3. WHNO carried Light TV until the station was sold to CTN.

When CTN took over the station, all of the secular and outside digital subchannels were dropped in favor of CTN's in-house subchannel offerings, CTN Lifestyle (a mix of secular lifestyle and religious programs) on 20.2 and CTNi (CTN's Spanish service) on 20.3.

=== Analog-to-digital conversion ===
WHNO shut down its analog signal, over UHF channel 20, on January 16, 2009. The station's digital signal remained on its pre-transition UHF channel 21, using virtual channel 20. This made WHNO the second television station in the New Orleans market (after WVUE) to discontinue its analog signal prior to the June 12, 2009, digital transition deadline.
