= WYBU-CD =

Television station in Columbus, Georgia, United States

- Columbus, Georgia; Phenix City, Alabama; United States
- City: Columbus, Georgia
- Channels: Digital: 26 (UHF); Virtual: 16
- Branding: CTN Central Georgia

Programming
- Affiliations: 16.1: CTN; for others, see § Subchannels

Ownership
- Owner: Christian Television Network, Inc.

History
- First air date: May 1987
- Former call signs: W16AF (1985–1996); WCGT-LP (1996–2006); WYBU-CA (2006–2010)
- Former channel numbers: Analog: 16 (UHF, 1985–2010); Digital: 16 (UHF, 2010–2020)
- Former affiliations: UPN (1998–1999)

Technical information
- Licensing authority: FCC
- Facility ID: 17544
- Class: CD
- ERP: 15 kW
- HAAT: 175.9 m (577 ft)
- Transmitter coordinates: 32°27′59″N 85°3′22″W

Links
- Public license information: Public file; LMS
- Website: www.ctnonline.com/affiliate-stations/ctn-central-georgia/

WYBU-CD (channel 16) is a low-power, Class A religious television station in Columbus, Georgia, United States, owned by the Christian Television Network (CTN). The station's studios are located on 4th Place (off US 280) in Phenix City, Alabama, and its transmitter is located on Windtree Drive west of Phenix City.

Channel 16 has been on the air since 1987 as a low-power station in Columbus. For most of its first 20 years in service, "TV-16" aired local programming and content from various sources, including the American Christian Television System. From 1998 to 1999, it was the Columbus-area affiliate of UPN. CTN purchased the station in 2005.

== History ==
=== Early years ===
Channel 16, with the call sign W16AF, was on the air in Columbus by May 1987, when it placed advertising in local newspapers announcing its existence. In December 1987, the license was transferred to Dr. Stephen Hollis, a local ophthalmologist who had built the station. Hollis also owned W22AH (channel 22), which began broadcasting in September. In February 1989, the sale of the two stations to Brenda Walls and Linda McCarter was reported locally. Their husbands, Reid Walls and Ron McCarter, owned American Cable Company, a new cable system serving North Columbus. Where Hollis had been fighting to get cable carriage for his stations, channels 16 and 22 quickly appeared on the American lineup. At this point, channel 16 was mostly airing programming from the American Christian Television System (ACTS), the original licensee, as well as rebroadcasts of Columbus city council meetings; W22AH was airing the Trinity Broadcasting Network. Mick Walsh, television columnist for the Ledger-Enquirer, credited the cable carriage with ensuring channel 16's survival.

Even though the sale was reported, Hollis did not actually sell the station until 1991, when the Earley family of Birmingham, Alabama, acquired channel 16 from Hollis. In the 1990s, "TV-16" began airing considerably more local programming. In 1991, it began airing a same-day video replay of the Talkline program on local radio station WRCG (1420 AM). A former candidate for the Georgia state legislature, James White, hosted the conservative commentary program The Right Side, which debuted in 1993. However, the Earleys' plan to use high school football as a selling point for the station—a strategy that had been successful in Alabama—did not play in Columbus. Further, the station had signal issues, even on the cable systems that carried it. Walsh called trying to tune it in "like trying to find a pearl in a dishpan full of dirty dishes" and noted, "If TV-16 was a horse, it would have been shot long ago."

=== McClure Broadcasting ownership ===
By 1996, Hollis owned the station again, and this time, it was sold to McClure Broadcasting, which owned a cluster of radio stations in Columbus. McClure made significant changes to revamp the station's facilities and image. New call letters, WCGT-LP, were adopted. It also announced its intention to move the transmitter to the tower of McClure-owned WCGQ and fight for a spot on the TCI-TeleCable system, the only one of three in the city that did not carry channel 16. This particular system was the largest in the city: whereas the other cable systems airing channel 16 had 40,000 subscribers, TCI-TeleCable alone had 37,000. Pledges to upgrade the signal and programming were successful in earning WCGT-LP a spot on the TCI system in August 1997.

In April 1998, WCGT-LP began airing UPN's prime time programming. However, the station's timing in doing so was poor. The WB, UPN's rival, had just launched The WB 100+ Station Group of cable-only affiliates in small markets, including Columbus. That left full-power station WSWS-TV in Opelika, Alabama, without an affiliation. WSWS-TV began courting UPN nearly immediately and even announced it would be the new affiliate in October 1998, but channel 16 remained the sole source of UPN programming in the Columbus market until September 1999, when UPN affiliated with WSWS-TV.

In 2003, Archway Broadcasting acquired the McClure radio stations, though channel 16 was not sold in the deal. The station's programming in 2004 consisted primarily of Christian religious programs and an assortment of local series, though the station also aired local sports in the form of Columbus Wardogs arena football and Phenix City Central High School football.

=== CTN ownership ===
Chuck McClure, the owner of McClure Broadcasting, died in July 2004. His estate then sold WCGT-CA to the Christian Television Network of Largo, Florida, for $300,000 in November 2005; CTN immediately assumed operational control under a local marketing agreement.

In addition to national programming from CTN and other Christian television producers, CTN continues to maintain the Phenix City studios for the production of local programs.

== Subchannels ==
The station's signal is multiplexed:

Subchannels of WYBU-CD
Subchannel	Res.	Short name	Programming
16.1	1080i	WYBU-HD	CTN
16.2	480i	Life	CTN Lifestyle (4:3)
16.3	480i	CTNi	CTN International (4:3)
16.4	480i	N2	Newsmax2 (4:3)
16.5	480i	BIZ-TV	Biz TV (4:3)
