= WHLV-TV =

Television station in Cocoa, Florida

- Cocoa–Orlando, Florida; United States
- City: Cocoa, Florida
- Channels: Digital: 32 (UHF); Virtual: 52

Programming
- Affiliations: 52.1: TBN; for others, see § Subchannels

Ownership
- Owner: Trinity Broadcasting Network; (Trinity Broadcasting of Texas, Inc.)

History
- First air date: August 6, 1982
- Former call signs: WTGL-TV (1982–2007)
- Former channel numbers: Analog: 52 (UHF, 1982–2009); Digital: 51 (UHF, until 2020)
- Former affiliations: CTN (1980s–1990s); TLN (until 2006); Faith TV (until 2006)

Technical information
- Licensing authority: FCC
- Facility ID: 24582
- ERP: 900 kW
- HAAT: 494 m (1,621 ft)
- Transmitter coordinates: 28°35′12.6″N 81°4′57.5″W

Links
- Public license information: Public file; LMS
- Website: www.tbn.org

WHLV-TV (channel 52) is a religious television station licensed to Cocoa, Florida, United States, serving the Orlando area. The station is owned by the Trinity Broadcasting Network (TBN). WHLV-TV's transmitter is located in unincorporated Bithlo, Florida.

WHLV-TV formerly operated from studios located within the TBN-owned Holy Land Experience, a Christian theme park which closed in 2020. One year earlier in 2019, the Federal Communications Commission (FCC) abolished the "Main Studio Rule", which required full-service television stations like WHLV-TV to maintain facilities in or near their communities of license.

== History ==
The station was founded August 16, 1982, as WTGL-TV by Good Life Broadcasting (WTGL stands for "The Good Life"). The station was initially a blend of family-type general entertainment programming such as classic cartoons, westerns, classic sitcoms and old movies, as well as Christian programming.

WTGL was at a severe disadvantage, since it was licensed in Brevard County. As a result, even though its transmitter was located as close to Orlando as possible while staying within 15 miles (24 km) of Cocoa (as required by Federal Communications Commission regulations of the time), Orlando only got a grade B signal. The market's second-largest city, Daytona Beach, barely got any signal at all. As a result, WTGL began dropping most of its secular programming by 1984, and by 1985 became an affiliate of the Clearwater-based Christian Television Network, becoming the network's second station alongside flagship WCLF in Clearwater. In the mid-1990s, a small amount of entertainment programming was added. The station would end its affiliation with CTN in the late 1990s, but it continued to operate as a predominantly religious station, changing its affiliations to the Total Living Network and Faith TV.

On December 12, 2000, after the FCC began to permit duopolies, Good Life Broadcasting signed on a second station, WLCB-TV (channel 45). WLCB aired a mix of Christian shows, public domain movies, public domain episodes of some shows, as well as low budget classic sitcoms, sports shows, and lifestyle programming. WTGL continued on with a mostly Christian format.

On September 28, 2006, it was announced that WTGL-TV had been sold to the Trinity Broadcasting Network. Good Life Broadcasting continued to control the original WTGL's master control operations. The two stations shared a studio at the corner of Michigan Street and I-4 in Orlando until June 2007, when then-WLCB and the master control for what was then WTGL moved to the former studios of WKCF in Lake Mary.

In August 2007, WTGL's calls were changed to its current calls, WHLV-TV. This made the WTGL callsign available to the former WLCB, which officially took the WTGL calls in mid-September 2007.

Under the previous ownership of Good Life Broadcasting, then-WTGL-TV applied for a digital signal on channel 53, but the request was dismissed on account of the station's license being put up for sale (Good Life Broadcasting effectively moved the intellectual unit of the original WTGL-TV to what was then WLCB-TV, which today bears the WTGL call sign).

On January 22, 2009, WHLV's analog transmitter experienced a tube failure—the same problem which reduced the analog signal of WKCF to 60 percent of its authorized power. Unlike most other TBN owned-and-operated stations (which went digital exclusive on April 16, 2009), WHLV continued operating its analog transmitter at half of its licensed power under special temporary authority until the June 12 changeover date. On that day, WHLV activated its post-transition channel 51 digital transmitter after WOGX in nearby Ocala, Florida, ceased analog transmissions on that channel.

In June 2009, channels 52.2–52.5 were initially added to the digital lineup, but for unknown reasons the channels remained dark and carried no actual programming until August 15, 2010, when they finally began to pass TBN multiplex programming. At that point, master control was turned over to TBN. Since then, the station, like most other TBN O&Os, has essentially been a pass-through for automated TBN programming.

== Technical information ==
=== Subchannels ===
The station's signal is multiplexed:

Subchannels of WHLV-TV
Subchannel	Res.	Short name	Programming
52.1	720p	TBN HD	TBN
52.2	720p	TVDEALS	Infomercials
52.3	480i	Inspire	TBN Inspire
52.4	480i	ONTV4U	OnTV4U (infomercials) (4:3)
52.5	480i	POSITIV	Positiv

TBN-owned full-power stations permanently ceased analog transmissions on April 16, 2009.

=== Analog-to-digital conversion ===
WHLV-TV shut down its analog signal, over UHF channel 52, on June 12, 2009, the official date on which full-power television stations in the United States transitioned from analog to digital broadcasts under federal mandate. The station's digital signal continued to broadcasts on its pre-transition UHF channel 51, using virtual channel 52.
