= WLCF-LD =

Television station in Decatur, Illinois

- Decatur, Illinois; United States
- Channels: Digital: 17 (UHF); Virtual: 45

Programming
- Affiliations: 45.1: CTN; for others, see § Subchannels

Ownership
- Owner: Christian Television Network, Inc.

History
- First air date: December 5, 1991; (initial licensing date)
- Former call signs: W41BL (1991–1996); WEIL-LP (1996–2008); WLCF-LP (2008–2020)
- Former channel numbers: Analog: 41 (UHF, 1993–2002), 54 (UHF, 2002–2007), 45 (UHF, 2007–2008); Digital: 45 (UHF, 2008–2020)
- Call sign meaning: "Where the Love of Christ Flows"; -or-; Disambiguation of CTN's flagship station, WCLF

Technical information
- Licensing authority: FCC
- Facility ID: 37482
- Class: LD
- ERP: 15 kW
- HAAT: 309.6 m (1,016 ft)
- Transmitter coordinates: 39°57′3″N 88°52′5″W

Links
- Public license information: LMS
- Website: www.ctnonline.net/wlcf-tv.html

WLCF-LD (channel 45) is a low-power religious television station in Decatur, Illinois, United States, owned by the Christian Television Network (CTN). The station's transmitter is located north of Oreana, Illinois. WLCF-LD offers 24-hour religious programming, much of which is produced either locally or at the CTN home base in Clearwater, Florida.

CTN acquired WLCF from another religious broadcaster, Believers Broadcasting Corporation, in February 2008.

== Subchannels ==
The station's signal is multiplexed:

Subchannels of WLCF-LD
| Channel | Res. | Short name | Programming |
|---|---|---|---|
| 45.1 | 1080i | WLCF LD | CTN |
| 45.2 | 480i | Lifesty | CTN Lifestyle (4:3) |
| 45.3 | 480i | CTNi | CTN International |
| 45.4 | 480i | N2 | Newsmax2 |
| 45.5 | 480i | BIZ-TV | Biz TV |
