= WEPH =

Television station in Tupelo, Mississippi

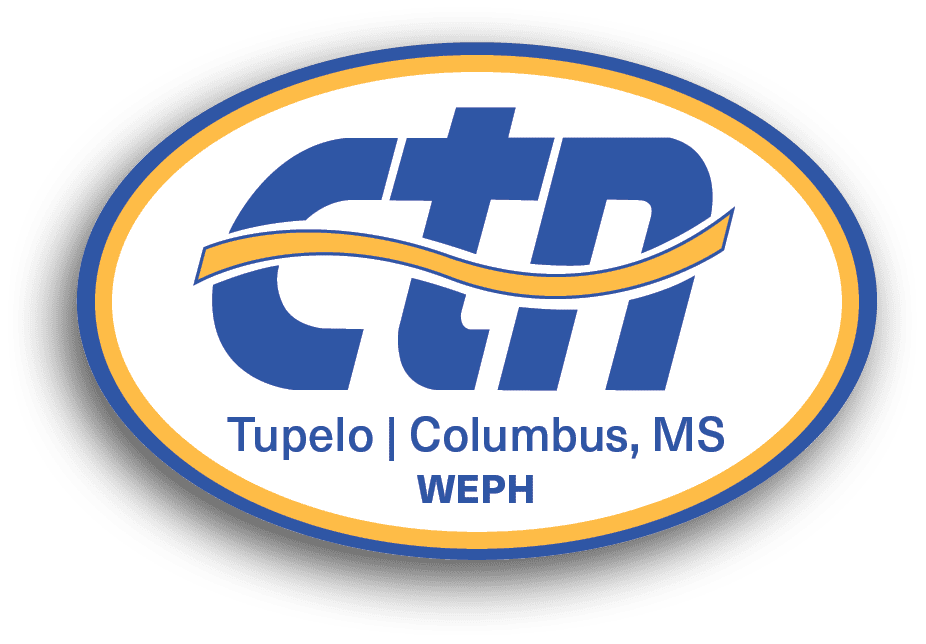
- Tupelo–Columbus, Mississippi; United States
- City: Tupelo, Mississippi
- Channels: Digital: 17 (UHF); Virtual: 49

Programming
- Affiliations: 49.1: CTN; for others, see § Subchannels

Ownership
- Owner: Christian Television Network; (Christian Television Network of Mississippi, Inc.)

History
- First air date: October 6, 2010 (initial licensing date)
- Former channel numbers: Digital: 49 (UHF, 2010–2018)

Technical information
- Licensing authority: FCC
- Facility ID: 83946
- ERP: 700 kW
- HAAT: 453 m (1,486 ft)
- Transmitter coordinates: 33°47′40″N 89°5′16″W

Links
- Public license information: Public file; LMS
- Website: ctnonline.com/affiliate/weph/

WEPH (channel 49) is a religious television station in Tupelo, Mississippi, United States, owned by the Christian Television Network (CTN). The station's studios are located on County Road 1702 in Tupelo, and its transmitter is located northwest of Woodland, Mississippi.

== History ==
The station was founded in October 2010. It is the only full-power television station (excepting the MPB stations in Booneville, Oxford and Mississippi State) in northeast Mississippi to have never been affiliated with a major commercial television network.

== Subchannels ==
The station's signal is multiplexed:

Subchannels of WEPH
Channel	Res.	Short name	Programming
49.1	720p	WEPH-HD	CTN
49.2	480i	Lifesty	CTN Lifestyle (4:3)
49.3	480i	CTNi	CTN International (4:3)
49.4	480i	N2	Newsmax2 (4:3)
49.5	480i	BIZ-TV	Biz TV

== Out-of-market coverage ==
WEPH is also carried outside the Tupelo–Columbus market on some cable systems in the Mississippi Delta, as well as Franklin, Amite and Perry counties in southern Mississippi.
