= Christian Television Network =

American religious television network

Christian Television Network, Inc.
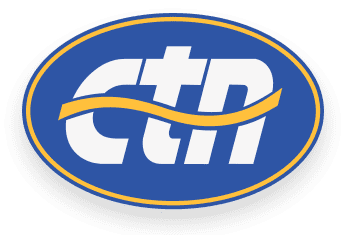
- Type: Television network
- Country: United States
- Broadcast area: United States, worldwide (not available in all markets or regions)
- Headquarters: 6922 142nd Ave, Largo FL

Ownership
- Key people: Yolanda Morris Brian Morris Bodie D'Andrea

History
- Launched: 1979
- Founder: Robert D'Andrea

Links
- Website: http://www.ctnonline.com/

Christian Television Network, Inc. (CTN) is an American non-profit broadcast television network of small owned-and-operated stations (O&O) that broadcasts religious programming. It is based in Largo, Florida (with a mailing address of Clearwater), and the flagship station is WCLF channel 22, which signed on the air in the Tampa Bay region in 1979. It is now available on DirecTV channel 376, Dish Network channel 262, and Glorystar channel 117. The channel was started to produce and broadcast programming to teach and encourage Christian living. It was founded by Robert D'Andrea, who died in January 2022.

== Program services ==
CTN operates two channels:

- The main CTN service focuses primarily on televangelism with some alternative medicine infomercials and a block of exercise videos.
- CTNi is also televangelism-based but with all programming in Spanish.

A third channel, CTN Lifestyle, consisted of secular nonfiction programs from the syndication market; as of 2026, this channel is no longer offered.

== Stations ==
All stations are owned and operated by CTN unless specified.

(**) - indicates a station signed on by CTN or a CTN subsidiary.

| Media market | State/Terr. | Station | Channel | Notes |
|---|---|---|---|---|
| Colorado Springs | Colorado | KWHS-LD | 51 | |
| Denver | Colorado | KQDK-CD | 39 | (Note: Owned by Casa Media Partners, LLC.) |
| Fort Myers | Florida | WRXY-TV ** | 49 | |
| Inglis–Yankeetown–Lecanto | Florida | WYKE-CD | 47 | |
| Pensacola | Florida | WHBR ** | 33 | |
| Tallahassee | Florida | WVUP-CD ** | 45 | |
| Tampa–St. Petersburg | Florida | WCLF ** | 22 | |
| West Palm Beach | Florida | WFGC | 61 | |
| Columbus | Georgia | WYBU-CD | 16 | |
| Macon | Georgia | WGNM | 45 | (Note: Carried UPN along with CTN until September 2006.) |
| Decatur | Illinois | WLCF-LD | 45 | |
| Quincy | Illinois | WTJR | 16 | |
| Cedar Rapids–Waterloo | Iowa | KFXB-TV | 40 | |
| New Orleans | Louisiana | WHNO | 20 | |
| Tupelo | Mississippi | WEPH ** | 49 | |
| Jefferson City | Missouri | KFDR | 25 | |
| Las Vegas | Nevada | KEEN-CD | 17 | |
| Tulsa | Oklahoma | KWHB | 47 | |
| Aguadilla | Puerto Rico | WELU | 34 | (Note: Owned by Senda Educational Broadcasting.) |
| Isabel Segunda | Puerto Rico | WVQS-LD | 50 | |
| Quebradillas | Puerto Rico | WQSJ-CD | 48 | (Note: Satellite of WSJN-CD.) |
| Ponce | Puerto Rico | WUSP-LD | 25 | (Note: Daystar affiliate owned by Senda and operated by CTN.) |
| San Juan | Puerto Rico | WSJN-CD | 20 | |
| Charleston | South Carolina | WLCN-CD | 18 | |
| Chattanooga | Tennessee | WTNB-CD | 27 | |
| Knoxville | Tennessee | WVLR ** | 48 | |
| Nashville | Tennessee | WHTN | 39 | |
| Houston | Texas | KHLM-LD | 12 | |
| Cheyenne | Wyoming | KQCK | 33 | |

== Former affiliates ==
| Media market | State | Station | Channel | Notes |
|---|---|---|---|---|
| Orlando | Florida | WTGL-TV | 52 | |
| Orlando | Florida | WIRB | 56 | |
| Fort Lauderdale–Miami | Florida | WKID-TV | 51 | (Note: Purchased evening airtime in the late-1970s before the establishment of WCLF.) |
| Columbus | Georgia | WSWS | 66 | |
| Winston-Salem–Greensboro | North Carolina | WEJC | 20 | |

== Notes ==
Until 2011, Detroit, Michigan-based WLPC-LD also used the CTN and Christian Television Network names, but was never affiliated or associated with this network; that station has since renamed itself as Impact Network.
