= WGNM =

Television station in Macon, Georgia, United States

- Macon, Georgia; United States
- Channels: Digital: 33 (UHF); Virtual: 45
- Branding: CTN Central Georgia

Programming
- Affiliations: 45.1: CTN; for others, see § Subchannels

Ownership
- Owner: Christian Television Network, Inc.

History
- Founded: August 17, 1987
- First air date: November 30, 1990
- Former channel numbers: Analog: 64 (UHF, 1990–2008); Digital: 45 (UHF, 2003–2020)
- Former affiliations: Independent (1990–1996); UPN (1996–2006)
- Call sign meaning: Good News Television of Macon (founding owner)

Technical information
- Licensing authority: FCC
- Facility ID: 24618
- ERP: 793 kW
- HAAT: 223 m (732 ft)
- Transmitter coordinates: 32°45′51″N 83°33′32″W

Links
- Public license information: Public file; LMS
- Website: ctnonline.com/affiliate-stations/ctn-central-georgia/

WGNM (channel 45) is a religious television station in Macon, Georgia, United States, owned by the Christian Television Network (CTN). The station's studios are located on Steven Drive in northwestern Macon, and its transmitter is located on GA 87/US 23/US 129 ALT (Golden Isles Highway), along the Twiggs–Bibb county line.

== History ==
The station first signed on the air on November 30, 1990, as an independent station owned by the locally based Macon Urban Ministries, doing business as Good News Television. WGNM became an affiliate of UPN in the summer of 1996. The station was sold to the Christian Television Network (CTN) in February 2004; despite this, the new owner maintained the UPN affiliation and some syndicated secular programming, along with an overnight affiliation with the Shop at Home Network, though religious programming has always made up the bulk of WGNM's broadcast schedule.

Upon the merger of UPN and The WB into The CW, announced in January 2006, CTN used the opportunity to withdraw WGNM from carrying secular programming, refusing to take either The CW or MyNetworkTV. CTN completed the withdrawal on September 2, 2006, and switched to a fully religious schedule.

On February 1, 2008, WGNM turned off its analog transmitter and began broadcasting exclusively in digital.

On April 24, 2020, at 12 p.m., WGNM moved from RF channel 45 to RF channel 33 and began broadcasting in 1080i high definition.

== Subchannels ==
The station's signal is multiplexed:

Subchannels of WGNM
Subchannel	Res.	Short name	Programming
45.1	1080i	WGNM-DT	CTN
45.2	480i	N2	Newsmax2
45.3	480i	CTNi	CTN International (4:3)
45.4	480i	BUZZR	Buzzr
45.5	480i	BIZ-TV	Biz TV (4:3)
