= WHOT-TV =

Television station in Opelika, Alabama

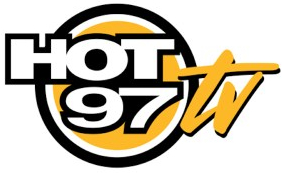
- Opelika, Alabama; Columbus–Atlanta, Georgia; United States
- City: Opelika, Alabama
- Channels: Digital: 17 (UHF); Virtual: 66
- Branding: HOT 97 TV

Programming
- Affiliations: 66.1: Hot 97 TV; for others, see § Subchannels

Ownership
- Owner: CNZ Communications, LLC; (CNZ Communications SE, LLC)

History
- First air date: May 23, 1982
- Former call signs: WSWS-TV (1982–2005); WLGA (2005–2020); WGBP (2020); WGBP-TV (2020–2025)
- Former channel numbers: Analog: 66 (UHF, 1982–2009); Digital: 47 (UHF, 2009–2013), 30 (UHF, 2013–2019)
- Former affiliations: Independent (1982–1984, 1998–1999, 2009–2010); CTN (1984–1995); The WB (1995–1998); UPN (1999–2006); The CW (2006–2009); WeatherNation (2012–2013); Antenna TV (2013–2017); Infomercials (2017); Cozi TV (2017–2020); NBC LX Home (2020–2024); Merit TV (2024–2025)
- Call sign meaning: For main channel's programming from Hot 97; Hotlanta is also a common nickname for Atlanta

Technical information
- Licensing authority: FCC
- Facility ID: 11113
- ERP: DTS1: 550 kW; DTS2: 589 kW
- HAAT: DTS1: 537 m (1,762 ft); DTS2: 424 m (1,391 ft)
- Transmitter coordinates: DTS1: 32°19′16.4″N 84°47′28.2″W; DTS2: 32°51′6.8″N 84°42′5.5″W
- Translator(s): WYGA-CD 66.1 (29 UHF) Atlanta

Links
- Public license information: Public file; LMS
- Website: www.hot97.com/tv/

WHOT-TV (channel 66) is a television station licensed to Opelika, Alabama, United States. Owned by CNZ Communications, the station broadcasts from a two-site distributed transmission system, with transmitters at Cusseta and Warm Springs, Georgia.

Channel 66 was allocated to Opelika in the early 1978 and went on air as WSWS-TV in 1982. It was an independent station for its first two years before airing the programs of the Christian Television Network for a decade. The station returned to secular programming in 1995 as an affiliate of The WB; the network moved its programming to a cable channel in the Columbus, Georgia, market in 1998, leaving channel 66 an independent again until then-owner Pappas Telecasting affiliated some of its stations with UPN in 1999. In 2005, the transmitter was moved from near Opelika to Cusseta, Georgia, and the station relaunched as WLGA. After The WB and UPN merged into The CW in 2006, channel 66 was an affiliate of that network until a sudden affiliation move in April 2009, amidst the bankruptcy of Pappas. The station was off the air for most of the period from June 2010 to June 2012 and was the last broadcast property held by a liquidating trust for Pappas, finally being sold in 2016 to CNZ Communications. CNZ built the Warm Springs transmitter, placing sufficient signal over parts of the Atlanta metropolitan area to seek must-carry status on cable within the far larger Atlanta market. It became WGBP-TV in 2020 and WHOT-TV in 2025, with a succession of digital multicast television networks on its primary subchannel.

== History ==
=== In Opelika: Early years ===
At the petition of Wardean, Inc., the Federal Communications Commission (FCC) allocated channel 66 to Opelika, Alabama, in 1978. Wardean then filed for and obtained a construction permit for the channel in 1979. However, it opted to wait to start the station because of high interest rates stifling the economy.

WSWS-TV went on the air on May 23, 1982, a week after starting test broadcasts, as an independent station. Two years later, it was sold to the Christian Television Network (CTN) of Largo, Florida, airing Christian ministry programs as well as financial news from the Financial News Network. It was CTN's first television ministry outside of Florida. As a ministry, the station was hindered by its location in Opelika and not the main population center in its coverage area, Columbus, Georgia. When station manager Ron E. Cottle proposed opening a Columbus studio in 1987, neighbors near the planned facility protested its location in a residential area. Its signal was weak on local cable systems, and Phenix City Cable removed the station from its lineup in 1988 to add TNT.

=== Affiliations with The WB, UPN, and The CW ===
After a decade, the station started to emerge from Christian programming. It was sold to RCH Broadcasting, also known as Genesis Broadcasting, of Tampa and affiliated with The WB after taking programming from America One to replace its Christian programs. RCH then sold it to Pappas Telecasting. The WB, however, was not a panacea for its poor signal, which continued to trouble local cable companies that refused to carry the station; a plan to move to the tower of WRBL and WTVM in Cusseta, Georgia, fell through. In 1998, WSWS-TV announced it would switch from The WB to UPN. However, by the fall, UPN still had not moved, though it had lost The WB to a cable channel; in October, UPN programs were only being seen on WCGT-LP (channel 16), which had just gained the UPN affiliation in April. It was not until September 1999 that UPN affiliated with WSWS-TV.

In 2005, the station began to prepare to relocate from its original transmitter site at Salem Hill, near Opelika, to Cusseta, where it was building a new 1,766-foot (538 m) mast and high-power transmission facility near that used by WRBL and WTVM; it also planned to relocate its offices to Columbus. However, the tower suddenly blew over in a storm on February 27. During the rebuild, Pappas proceeded with its relaunch plans, including changing the call sign to WLGA on June 27, 2005. The tower was rebuilt at a height of 1,814 feet (553 m) and brought into service late in 2005. When The WB and UPN merged to form The CW in 2006, WLGA—the only broadcast affiliate between the two networks—became its Columbus-area affiliate as part of a 10-year agreement between the new network and Pappas.

=== Loss of CW affiliation ===
On April 2, 2009, it was announced that The CW would move to a subchannel of NBC affiliate WLTZ beginning April 27. The move came at a perilous moment for Pappas. The company had filed for Chapter 11 bankruptcy reorganization in May 2008; while the beginning of the Great Recession was primarily to blame, the company's bankruptcy filing specifically cited The CW's poor ratings.

After operating as an independent, the station's on-air record became spotty while Pappas worked through bankruptcy. On June 4, 2010, Pappas took WLGA off the air citing its bankruptcy and "the scarcity of funds generally" at the venture. It briefly went back on the air beginning May 31, 2011, to retain its license before leaving the air again on June 14, 2011. The station returned to the air in 2012 with WeatherNation and later Antenna TV, but it continued to be in Pappas's liquidating trust. By 2015, just three former Pappas stations had not been sold: the combination of KCWI-TV and KDMI in Des Moines, Iowa, and WLGA.

=== CNZ Communications ownership; Atlanta move-in ===
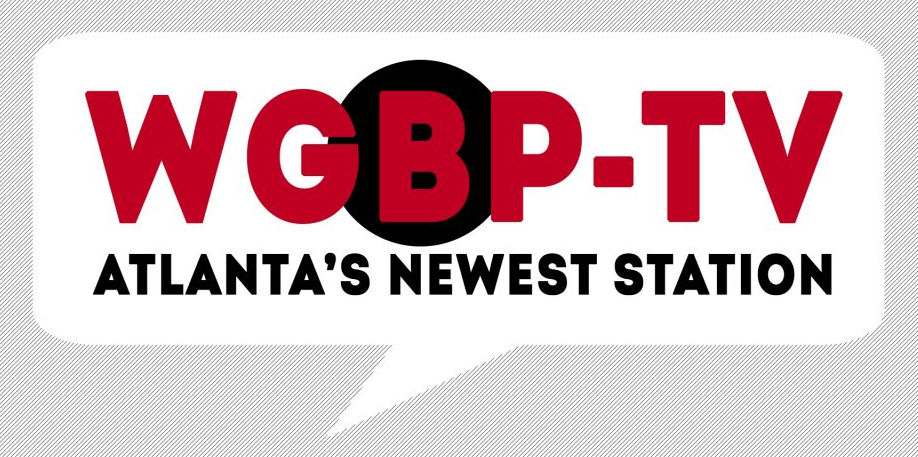
Logo as WGBP-TV

Pappas finally liquidated WLGA in 2016 by selling it to CNZ Communications for $500,000.

CNZ invested in adding a second transmitter at Warm Springs, Georgia, converting the station into a distributed transmission system (DTS). The primary purpose of this was to extend the station's signal to include the Atlanta area, a move that allowed CNZ to successfully petition Nielsen Media Research to reclassify the station into the Atlanta designated market area in September 2020. At that time, the call sign changed to WGBP-TV. In January 2022, the FCC denied a carriage complaint made by WGBP-TV against satellite TV provider DirecTV, but it signaled that the station would qualify for must-carry status in both Columbus and Atlanta during the next round of retransmission consent elections.

On October 6, 2025, it was announced that the station, which had changed its call sign from WGBP-TV to WHOT-TV on October 1, would on October 30 affiliate with MediaCo Holding's Hot 97 TV—a free ad-supported streaming television (FAST) channel produced by New York City urban contemporary radio station WQHT featuring programming on hip-hop music and culture.

== Subchannels ==
The station's signal is multiplexed:

Subchannels of WHOT-TV
Subchannel	Res.	Short name	Programming
66.1	720p	WGBPTV	Hot 97 TV
66.2	480i	WHKY	[Blank]
66.3	480i	ShopHQ	Infomercials
66.4	480i	HSN	HSN
66.5	480i	QVC	QVC
66.7	480i	TRUCRIM	True Crime Network
66.8	480i	QVC2	QVC2
66.9	480i	WHKY14	[Blank]
66.10	480i	JTV	Jewelry TV
66.11	480i	MarioVi	Mariavision
66.12	480i	CRTV	Infomercials
