= WFGC =

Television station in Palm Beach, Florida

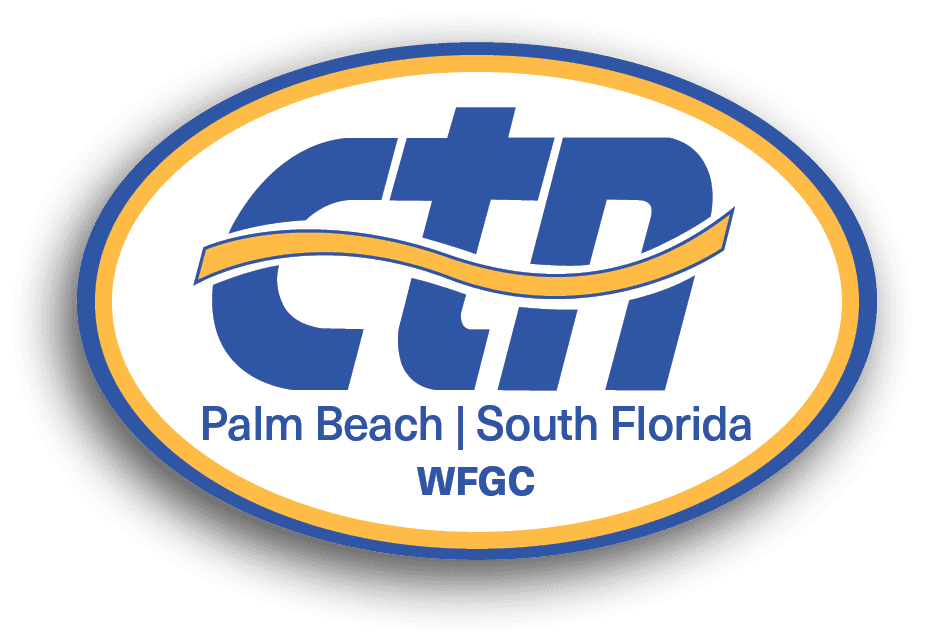
- Palm Beach–West Palm Beach, Florida; United States
- City: Palm Beach, Florida
- Channels: Digital: 7 (VHF); Virtual: 61
- Branding: CTN Palm Beach–South Florida

Programming
- Affiliations: 61.1: CTN; for others, see § Subchannels

Ownership
- Owner: Christian Television Network; (Christian Television of Palm Beach County, Inc.)

History
- First air date: May 21, 1993
- Former channel numbers: Analog: 61 (UHF, 1993–2009); Digital: 49 (UHF, 2003–2020)
- Call sign meaning: West Palm Beach; Florida; God; Christ

Technical information
- Licensing authority: FCC
- Facility ID: 11123
- ERP: 67.6 kW
- HAAT: 354 m (1,161 ft)
- Transmitter coordinates: 26°35′21.2″N 80°12′42.8″W

Links
- Public license information: Public file; LMS
- Website: ctnonline.com/affiliate/wfgc/

WFGC (channel 61) is a religious television station licensed to Palm Beach, Florida, United States, serving the West Palm Beach area. The station is owned by the Christian Television Network (CTN). WFGC's studios are located on West Blue Heron Boulevard in Riviera Beach (in the former studio of Fox affiliate WFLX, channel 29), and its transmitter is located near Royal Palm Beach, Florida.

== Technical information ==
=== Subchannels ===
The station's signal is multiplexed:

Subchannels of WFGC
Subchannel	Res.	Short name	Programming
61.1	1080i	WFGC-HD	CTN
61.2	480i	N2	Newsmax2 (4:3)
61.3	480i	CTNi	CTN International (4:3)
61.4	480i	BUZZR	Buzzr (4:3)
61.5	480i	BIZ-TV	Biz TV (4:3)

=== Analog-to-digital conversion ===
WFGC ended regular programming on its analog signal, over UHF channel 61, on June 12, 2009, the official date on which full-power television stations in the United States transitioned from analog to digital broadcasts under federal mandate. The station's digital signal remained on its pre-transition UHF channel 49, using virtual channel 61.
