= KEEN-CD =

Television station in Las Vegas

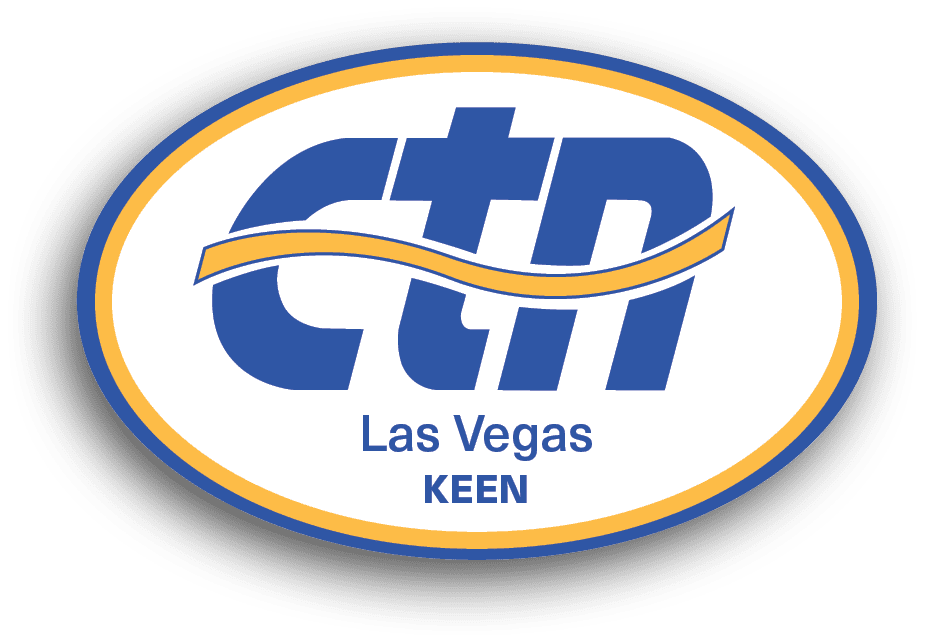
- Las Vegas, Nevada; United States
- Channels: Digital: 17 (UHF); Virtual: 17
- Branding: CTN Las Vegas

Programming
- Affiliations: 17.1: CTN

Ownership
- Owner: Christian Television Network; (Christian Television of Las Vegas, Inc.)

History
- Founded: August 21, 1990
- Former call signs: K17CT (1990–1997); KEEN-LP (1997–2008); KEEN-CA (2008–2010)
- Former affiliations: America One; Independent; TLN; LeSEA
- Call sign meaning: Keen (slang for great; wonderful; marvelous)

Technical information
- Licensing authority: FCC
- Facility ID: 10498
- Class: CD
- ERP: 4.1 kW
- HAAT: 317.6 m (1,042 ft)
- Transmitter coordinates: 36°0′36.4″N 115°0′22.7″W

Links
- Public license information: Public file; LMS
- Website: www.ctnonline.com/affiliate-stations/ctn-las-vegas-keen/

KEEN-CD (channel 17) is a low-power, Class A television station in Las Vegas, Nevada, United States, owned by the Christian Television Network (CTN). The station's transmitter is located on Black Mountain southeast of Henderson.

== History ==
On August 21, 1990, the Federal Communications Commission (FCC) granted an original construction permit to Charles K. "Harry" Tootle to build a low-power television station serving the Las Vegas metropolitan area on UHF channel 17. The station was given callsign K17CT and was licensed on September 14, 1993. Early programming mostly consisted of locally produced talk shows and seminars on videotape from the conservative "Patriot" community, which were also shown on Tootle's other licensed station, K19CS.

Tootle sold the station to Innovative Technologies, Inc. of Las Vegas in August 1996. The new owners changed the station's call letters to KEEN-LP in October 1997 and on January 2, 2001, the license for KEEN-LP was upgraded to Class A, although the station at that time kept the "-LP" suffix instead of changing to "-CA". It operated as a local independent station and earned recognition for its, appropriately, innovative use of the Internet. In addition to over-the-air viewing (the station was not carried by the local cable companies), KEEN-LP broadcast over the Internet, and while that was not notable in itself, the station made it possible for viewers of any given program to participate in live chat sessions, making the experience truly interactive.

VMG Broadcasting Company acquired the station in September 2003, transferred control of the station to Christian Communications of Chicagoland two months later, then sold the station outright in September 2004. On August 12, 2008, the call sign was changed from KEEN-LP to KEEN-CA, and again to KEEN-CD on August 4, 2010.

On February 5, 2018, it was announced that LeSEA Broadcasting (now Family Broadcasting Corporation) would sell KEEN, along with KWHS-LD in Colorado Springs, Colorado, and full-power station WHNO in New Orleans, to Clearwater, Florida–based Christian Television Network. The sale was completed on April 23, 2018.

== Programming ==
As a LeSEA O&O, KEEN-CA broadcast programming that can be defined as a mix between sacred and secular. Religious programming was interspersed throughout the day, but the station also aired classic family television programming, such as Ozzie & Harriet, Make Room for Daddy, and Little House on the Prairie. A three-hour block of Saturday morning children's programming meets the station's E/I requirements, and a two-hour block of Saturday evening Spanish-language programming caters to the area's large Hispanic population.

The programming mix, unique for LeSEA and tailored for the Las Vegas market, has met with some success. The National Religious Broadcasters organization named KEEN-LP its Low Power Station of the Year in 2005.

== Subchannels ==
The station's signal is multiplexed:

Subchannels of KEEN-CD
Subchannel	Res.	Short name	Programming
17.1	1080i	KEEN	CTN
17.3	480i	CTNI	CTN International (4:3)
17.5	480i	BIZ-TV	Biz TV (4:3)
