= WHBR (TV) =

Television station in Pensacola, Florida

- Pensacola, Florida; Mobile, Alabama; United States
- City: Pensacola, Florida
- Channels: Digital: 34 (UHF); Virtual: 33
- Branding: CTN Pensacola-Tallahassee

Programming
- Affiliations: 33.1: CTN; for others, see § Technical information and subchannels

Ownership
- Owner: Christian Television Network; (Christian Television of Pensacola/Mobile, Inc.)

History
- First air date: January 30, 1986 (Note: The Broadcasting and Cable Yearbook says January 27, while the Television and Cable Factbook says January 26.)
- Former channel numbers: Analog: 33 (UHF, 1986–2009)

Technical information
- Licensing authority: FCC
- Facility ID: 10894
- ERP: 1,000 kW
- HAAT: 415 m (1,362 ft)
- Transmitter coordinates: 30°36′45.4″N 87°38′41.6″W

Links
- Public license information: Public file; LMS
- Website: www.ctnonline.com/affiliate-stations/ctn-pensacola-tallahassee-whbr-wvup/

WHBR (channel 33) is a religious television station licensed to Pensacola, Florida, United States, serving northwest Florida and southwest Alabama. The station is owned by the Christian Television Network (CTN). WHBR's studios are located on Pensacola Boulevard (US 29) in Pensacola, and its transmitter is located in Robertsdale, Alabama.

== History ==
The station was founded in January 1986.

WHBR ended regular programming on its analog signal, over UHF channel 33, on January 20, 2009. The station's digital signal remained on its pre-transition UHF channel 34, using virtual channel 33.

== Technical information and subchannels ==
WHBR's transmitter is located in Robertsdale, Alabama. The station's signal is multiplexed:

Subchannels of WHBR
Subchannel	Res.	Short name	Programming
33.1	1080i	WHBR-HD	CTN
33.3	480i	CTNi	CTN International (4:3)
33.4	480i	N2	Newsmax2 (4:3)
33.5	480i	BIZ-TV	Biz TV
