= WVUP-CD =

Television station in Tallahassee, Florida

- Tallahassee, Florida; Thomasville, Georgia; United States
- City: Tallahassee, Florida
- Channels: Digital: 30 (UHF); Virtual: 45
- Branding: CTN Pensacola-Tallahassee

Programming
- Affiliations: 45.1: CTN; for others, see § Subchannels

Ownership
- Owner: Christian Television Network; (Christian Television Corporation, Inc.)

History
- First air date: May 11, 1984
- Former call signs: W17AB (1984–2000); WVUP-LP (2000–2001); WVUP-CA (2001–2009)
- Former affiliations: Independent (1984–1989); HSN (1989); Religious (1989–1998); UPN (1998–2001)
- Call sign meaning: Station was an affiliate of UPN in the early 2000s

Technical information
- Licensing authority: FCC
- Facility ID: 3032
- Class: CD
- ERP: 15 kW
- HAAT: 260.6 m (855 ft)
- Transmitter coordinates: 30°34′28″N 84°12′9″W

Links
- Public license information: Public file; LMS
- Website: www.ctnonline.com/affiliate-stations/ctn-pensacola-tallahassee-whbr-wvup/

WVUP-CD (channel 45) is a low-power, Class A television station in Tallahassee, Florida, United States, owned by the Christian Television Network (CTN). The station's studios are located on Capital Circle Northeast in Tallahassee, and its transmitter is located on Thomasville Road in northern Leon County, Florida, near the Georgia state line. WVUP-CD offers 24-hour religious programming, much of which is produced either locally or at the CTN home base in Clearwater, Florida.

The station went on the air in 1984 as W17AB and was one of the most successful low-power TV stations anywhere in the United States in the 1980s. However, the advent of a new full-power independent station led to its conversion to home shopping programs and then to local Christian programming. In the late 1990s and early 2000s, the station briefly returned to a general entertainment format as a UPN affiliate. However, its owner, Southern Nights Entertainment Corporation, was insufficiently capitalized. As a result, the station was sold at public sale in 2001 to The Note Capital Corporation. CTN then purchased it and returned it to the air with its Christian programming in 2003.

== History ==
=== W17AB in the 1980s ===
Octagon Corporation, the owner of WMBB-TV in Panama City, applied in 1980 to build a translator on channel 40 in Tallahassee to rebroadcast WMBB-TV to Panama City. At the time, the station was an NBC affiliate, which Tallahassee lacked. When channel 40—an underlying allocation for a full-service station in the city—received applications, Octagon then filed to build channel 40 outright as a full-power simulcaster of WMBB-TV. Those plans hit a snag, however, when an affiliation switch in Panama City turned WMBB-TV into an ABC affiliate, which Tallahassee already had. At the suggestion of the Federal Communications Commission (FCC), Octagon reapplied to operate a low-power station capable of originating its own programming. Group W Cable, which served Tallahassee, then made a lucrative suggestion of its own: if channel 17 went on the air as an independent, it would gain carriage on the cable system.

W17AB began broadcasting on May 11, 1984. However, it was not immediately seen in cable homes because the company feared adding the low-power station would require it to pay additional copyright fees. Octagon won a ruling in federal district court, and a copyright judge ruled that the addition of local low-power TV stations did not require such payments, paving the way for W17AB to be added to the Group W lineup in February 1985. The addition of cable coverage caused viewership to jump from 7,000 to 16,000 households; Arbitron began listing its programming in ratings surveys, a practice previously only afforded to full-power stations, and in its May and July 1985 ratings books, W17AB was the most-watched low-power station in the country.

In 1986, Phipps Television, owner of Tallahassee-area CBS affiliate WCTV, acquired W17AB and kept its format as a minority and local-interest complement to WCTV. The A. C. Nielsen Company, the other television ratings agency at the time, also began rating W17AB, making it the first low-power TV station so measured. In addition, Phipps upgraded programming and equipment.

However, the launch of new TV programming options cut severely into W17AB's marketability. In the span of a year, three new full- and low-power TV stations went on the air in the market. On March 13, 1989, the station switched from being an independent to rebroadcasting the Home Shopping Network, consequently losing its cable carriage; five people were laid off. Months later, the station was sold to Associated Christian Television System, owner of WACX, a Christian television station in Leesburg. By 1991, when it purchased W09BI (later WWRP-LP), it was airing an all-religious lineup on channel 17.

=== UPN affiliation ===
W17AB emerged from its religious programming in October 1998 and began airing UPN. The network had not been seen in Tallahassee for more than a year since WGVP in Valdosta, Georgia, in the Tallahassee media market but not receivable in the city, had become its affiliate. Southern Nights then acquired W17AB from Associated Christian Television System.

Concurrently with this move, Southern Nights was leasing and attempting to buy WGVP. In September 1998, it had reached a deal, filed with the FCC, to buy 51 percent of that station for $3.65 million. The deal hung at the FCC for 18 months before it granted approval in March 2000. The call sign on W17AB changed to WVUP-LP on April 20, 2000. Owing to financial complications, the Valdosta deal was not consummated, and the company's financial position deteriorated quickly. In September 2000, pursuant to early 1999 agreements between Southern Nights and WGVP owner Hutchens Communications, SNE auctioned its rights to purchase Hutchens to the highest bidder on the steps of the Lowndes County, Georgia, courthouse. A secured creditor then forced the public sale of WVUP-LP itself in February 2001.

In the wake of the sale, The Note Capital Corporation filed to assume the license of WVUP-LP. However, the station was so desperate for cash that it ran programming from the American Collectibles Network, a home shopping service, outside of UPN program hours and had not reliably been on the air for two months. Comcast cable system managers also claimed that some evenings, home shopping aired instead of the UPN lineup; as a result, Comcast removed WVUP-LP from its system in early March 2001. Don Palmer, head of Southern Nights, claimed that the primary reason for its financial struggles was litigation resulting from the failed Valdosta station purchase in which the company sought to recover costs it incurred running WGVP. UPN programs then turned up on a local cable channel in the interim, though there was no over-the-air broadcast of the network until WTLF started in 2003.

=== CTN ownership ===
In September 2002, The Note Capital Corporation sold WVUP-CA to the Christian Television Network (CTN) of Clearwater. CTN programming debuted on the station in 2003, and it returned to the local cable system in January 2004.

== Subchannels ==
The station's signal is multiplexed:

Subchannels of WVUP-CD
Subchannel	Res.	Short name	Programming
45.1	1080i	WVUP TV	CTN
45.3	480i	CTNi	CTN International (4:3)
45.4	480i	BUZZR	Buzzr (4:3)
45.5	480i	BIZ-TV	Biz TV (4:3)

== See also ==
- Christian Television Network
