= WBEH-CD =

Television station in Miami

- Miami–Fort Lauderdale, Florida; United States
- City: Miami, Florida
- Channels: Digital: 17 (UHF); Virtual: 38

Programming
- Affiliations: 38.1: Daystar; 38.2: Daystar Español; 38.3: Daystar Reflections

Ownership
- Owner: Daystar Television Network; (Word of God Fellowship, Inc.)

History
- First air date: March 2, 1993
- Former call signs: W20BE (1993–1997); W27BS (1997–1999); W61DD (1999); W31CD (1999–2000); WPMF-LP (2000–2014); WPMF-CD (2014–2018)
- Former channel numbers: Analog: 61 (UHF, 1998–2001), 31 (UHF, 2001–2003), 38 (UHF, 2003–2014); Digital: 38 (UHF, 2014–2019)
- Former affiliations: Azteca América (2002–2011; 2017–c. 2022); The Family Channel (2011–2017)

Technical information
- Licensing authority: FCC
- Facility ID: 30129
- Class: CD
- ERP: 15 kW
- HAAT: 184.6 m (606 ft)
- Transmitter coordinates: 25°58′8″N 80°13′19″W

Links
- Public license information: Public file; LMS

WBEH-CD (channel 38) is a low-power, Class A religious television station in Miami, Florida, United States, owned by the Daystar Television Network. The station's studios are located on Northwest 168th Street in Miami Gardens, and its transmitter is located in Andover, Florida.

== History ==
Launched March 2, 1993, W20BE on channel 20 went defunct within six months. (Note: FCC records: the station is listed as DW20BE for a point of time—a D in front of a call sign always indicates a defunct license.) The license was reactivated on September 27, 1995, becoming W20BE once more. What followed was a move to channel 27 as W27BS on January 9, 1997; and an attempt to move to channel 61, which would have made the station W61DD—the same day the change was made in FCC records on July 1, 1999; the calls changed again to W31CD and the station moved to channel 31. On May 31, 2000, W31CD became WPMF-LP, and a year later, WPMF received a Class A television license (though its calls retained the "-LP" suffix). The station received its license to broadcast digitally on January 3, 2014, at which point the call sign changed to WPMF-CD.

WPMF-LP joined Azteca América in November 2002. In 2011, it switched to My Family TV, which became The Family Channel in 2013. On November 1, 2017, WPMF-CD rejoined Azteca América, replacing WGEN-TV (channel 8). The station changed its call sign to WBEH-CD on November 9, 2018.

HC2 Holdings planned to acquire the station from Prime Time Partners in June 2019, along with WSPF-CD. The sale of WBEH-CD would fall through in 2020; in June 2022, Prime Time Partners would sell the station to the Word of God Fellowship, parent of the Daystar Television Network.

== Subchannels ==
The station's signal is multiplexed:

Subchannels of WBEH-CD
| Subchannel | Res. | Short name | Programming |
|---|---|---|---|
| 38.1 | 1080i | WBEH-CD | Daystar |
| 38.2 | 720p | WBEH-ES | Daystar Español |
| 38.3 | 480i | WBEH-SD | Daystar Reflections |
