= KDIT-CD =

Television station in Des Moines, Iowa

- Des Moines, Iowa (Note: Originally licensed to Marshalltown, Iowa; moved to Des Moines in 2022.); United States
- Channels: Digital: 17 (UHF); Virtual: 45
- Branding: Catchy Comedy Des Moines

Programming
- Affiliations: 45.1: Catchy Comedy; for others, see § Subchannels

Ownership
- Owner: Weigel Broadcasting; (KDIT-TV LLC)

History
- First air date: February 2, 1987
- Former call signs: K39AS (1985–1995); KDAO-LP (1995–2015); KDAO-CD (2015–2021)
- Former channel numbers: Analog: 39 (UHF, 1987–2000), 45 (UHF, 2000–2015); Digital: 44 (UHF, 2015–2019)
- Former affiliations: America One/AIN (2000s); Retro TV (until 2021)
- Call sign meaning: Des Moines Iowa Television

Technical information
- Licensing authority: FCC
- Facility ID: 46753
- Class: CD
- ERP: 15 kW
- HAAT: 557.6 m (1,829 ft)
- Transmitter coordinates: 41°49′48.0″N 93°36′51.6″W
- Translator(s): KDIT-LD 17 Fort Dodge

Links
- Public license information: Public file; LMS
- Website: KDIT-CD page on Catchy Comedy website

KDIT-CD (channel 45) is a low-power, Class A television station licensed to Des Moines, Iowa, United States, broadcasting the digital multicast network Catchy Comedy and four other Weigel networks. The station is owned by Weigel Broadcasting, and maintains a transmitter in Alleman, Iowa.

== History ==
Logo under former call sign.

On July 29, 2021, it was reported that Weigel Broadcasting would purchase the then KDAO-CD for $200,000, pending approval of the Federal Communications Commission (FCC). The sale did not include the KDAO-CD call sign, which was retained by MTN Broadcasting. The sale was completed on September 29; and the callsign was changed to KDIT-CD on October 12.

== Subchannels ==
The station's signal is multiplexed. CBS affiliate KCCI (channel 8) carries MeTV, Heroes & Icons and Story Television as subchannels under an existing contract between Weigel and KCCI's owner, Hearst Television (which does the same in many of its other markets).

Subchannels of KDIT-CD
Subchannel	Res.	Short name	Programming
45.1	480i	Catchy	Catchy Comedy
45.2	480i	Movies!	Movies!
45.3	480i	StartTV	Start TV
45.4	480i	TOONS	MeTV Toons
45.5	480i	WEST	WEST
45.6	480i	DABL	Dabl
45.12	480i	EMLW	OnTV4U (infomercials)
