= WCLF =

Television station in Clearwater, Florida

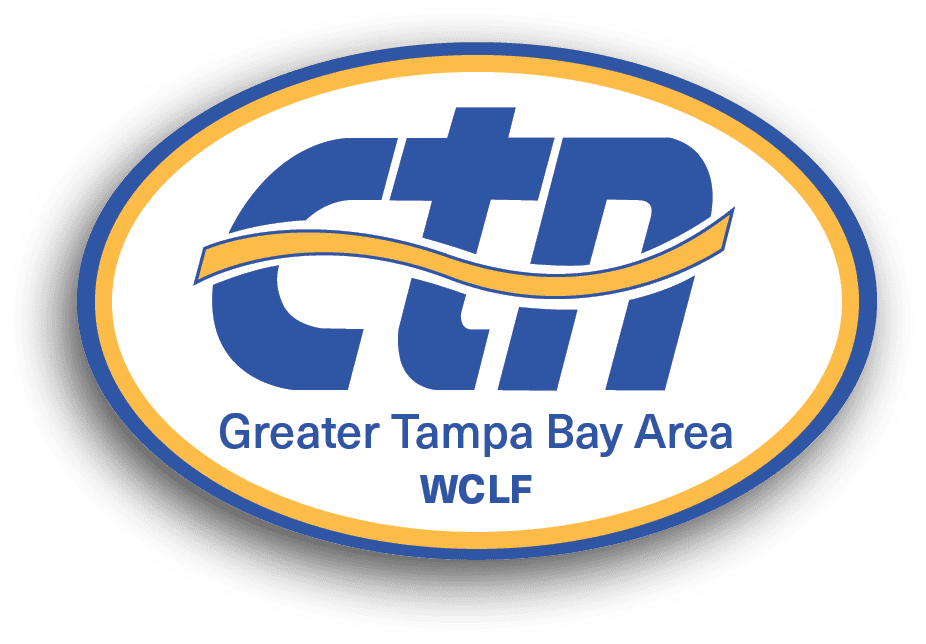
- Clearwater–Tampa–St. Petersburg, Florida; United States
- City: Clearwater, Florida
- Channels: Digital: 21 (UHF); Virtual: 22
- Branding: CTN Greater Tampa Bay

Programming
- Affiliations: 22.1: CTN; for others, see § Subchannels

Ownership
- Owner: Christian Television Network; (Christian Television Corporation, Inc.)

History
- First air date: October 24, 1979
- Former channel numbers: Analog: 22 (UHF, 1979–2009)
- Call sign meaning: "Where Christ's Love Flows" or "Clearwater, Florida"

Technical information
- Licensing authority: FCC
- Facility ID: 11125
- ERP: 1,000 kW
- HAAT: 409 m (1,342 ft)
- Transmitter coordinates: 27°49′10″N 82°15′39″W

Links
- Public license information: Public file; LMS
- Website: ctnonline.com/affiliate-stations/ctn-greater-tampa-bay/

WCLF (channel 22) is a religious television station licensed to Clearwater, Florida, United States, serving the Tampa Bay area. It is the flagship station of the nationwide Christian Television Network (CTN), which has owned and affiliated stations throughout the Southeastern and Midwestern United States. WCLF's studios are co-located with CTN's headquarters on 142nd Avenue in nearby Largo (with a Clearwater mailing address), and its transmitter is located near Riverview.

== History ==
In August 1977, Bob D'Andrea, a local electric contractor and born again Christian, applied for a construction permit to build a television station on Tampa's then-unused channel 28. The station would operate on a non-profit basis and telecast Christian programming. However, a month later, a second group, Family Television Corporation, also applied for the channel—the application that would eventually result in WFTS-TV five years later. With increased interest in channel 28, D'Andrea's reformed group, the Christian Television Corporation, amended its application for channel 22 at Clearwater and was granted a construction permit in February 1979. In the meantime, the station began programming prime time hours on WKID-TV in Fort Lauderdale; after the permit award, interim offices were set up at D'Andrea's electrical company in Largo. Construction also began on the transmitter facility, a site shared with WTSP-TV.

WCLF began broadcasting on October 24, 1979, from temporary quarters while studios on land donated by local Christian college Florida Beacon College were being completed. In addition to presenting programs from other Christian ministries and broadcasters nationally, such as The PTL Club and The 700 Club, WCLF announced local programs such as Horizons 22, a feature program, and Joy Junction, a children's show. Horizons 22 was originally co-hosted by Bob Wells and his wife Barbara; Bob also served as program director, relocating from Cleveland after stints as a weatherman and comedy personality for WJW-TV and general manager of radio station WSUM there. Construction of the Beacon College studios continued into 1980, and issues with fire codes led to lawsuits by the city of Largo and Pinellas County. One of the station's board members, John Wesley Fletcher, resigned in 1981 after being disfellowshipped by the Assemblies of God; he later played a role in the PTL financial scandal.

== Technical information ==
=== Subchannels ===
The station's signal is multiplexed:

Subchannels of WCLF
| Subchannel | Res. | Short name | Programming |
|---|---|---|---|
| 22.1 | 1080i | WCLF TV | CTN |
| 22.3 | 480i | CTNi | CTN International |
| 22.4 | 480i | N2 | Newsmax2 |
| 22.5 | 480i | BIZ-TV | Biz TV |

=== Analog-to-digital conversion ===
WCLF shut down its analog signal, over UHF channel 22, on February 17, 2009, to conclude the federally mandated transition from analog to digital television. The station's digital signal remained on its pre-transition UHF channel 21, using virtual channel 22.
