= WHME-TV =

Television station in South Bend, Indiana

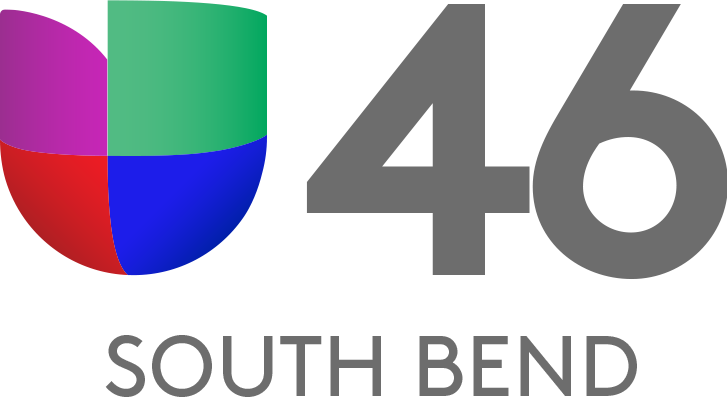
- South Bend, Indiana; United States
- Channels: Digital: 36 (UHF); Virtual: 46
- Branding: Univision 46 South Bend; Noticias N+ Univision South Bend (newscasts)

Programming
- Affiliations: 46.1: Univision; for others, see § Subchannels

Ownership
- Owner: Family Broadcasting Corporation; (Family Entertainment Television, Inc.)

History
- First air date: August 3, 1974
- Former call signs: WMSH-TV (1974–1977)
- Former channel numbers: Analog: 46 (UHF, 1974–2009); Digital: 48 (UHF, until 2019)
- Former affiliations: Religious independent (1974–2024)
- Call sign meaning: World Harvest Missionary Evangelism

Technical information
- Licensing authority: FCC
- Facility ID: 36117
- ERP: 260 kW
- HAAT: 304.3 m (998 ft)
- Transmitter coordinates: 41°35′43″N 86°9′38″W

Links
- Public license information: Public file; LMS
- Website: whmetv46.com

WHME-TV (channel 46) is a television station in South Bend, Indiana, United States, affiliated with the Spanish-language network Univision. The station is owned by locally based Family Broadcasting Corporation (formerly known as LeSEA Broadcasting and later World Harvest Broadcasting). WHME-TV's studios are located on Ironwood Road on the south side of South Bend, and its transmitter is located on Kern Road (near Roosevelt Road) in Mishawaka.

Prior to 2024, WHME-TV served as the flagship station of World Harvest Television, an organization founded by Assembly of God minister Lester Sumrall, whose sons are still active with the ministry.

== History ==
=== WMSH-TV ===
The G & E Religious and Educational Broadcasting Corporation obtained a construction permit for a new television station on channel 46 in South Bend on April 10, 1973. The allocation had previously been used by WNDU-TV, when that station signed on the air on July 15, 1955; WNDU moved to its present channel 16 in 1957. G & E, representing 618 churches, took the call letters WMSH-TV and broke ground on studio facilities on May 27. The transmitter site would be located separately from the studios due to potential interference to WSBT radio. Intended to begin on September 1, 1973, channel 46 instead began telecasting in late July or on August 3, 1974. (Note: The Broadcasting and Cable Yearbook says July 27, the FCC history card says the station started on July 26, and the Television and Cable Factbook says July 25.)

Within less than a year of telecasting, financial problems developed at G & E. The station had a total of $2.5 million in debt against $1.8 million in assets. A court placed the company into receivership, after which 14 creditors sued to force channel 46 into bankruptcy. Three months later, two investors who held $18,000 in station-issued bonds sued G & E for selling securities without being registered with federal or state authorities, as well as omissions in statements made by the company; Secretary of State Larry Conrad then charged G & E head George McQueen with criminal misrepresentation.

Citing lack of funds, WMSH-TV went silent September 2, 1975. The bankruptcy case stretched into 1976 as several buyers expressed interest.

=== WHME-TV ===
In January 1977, rumors began to circulate that the Lester Sumrall Evangelistic Association was in negotiations to buy WMSH-TV from its trustee, Elkhart attorney Gordon MacKenzie. The rumors would be confirmed in March when the $496,000 sale was announced. Sumrall closed on the purchase on July 21, and the newly renamed WHME-TV signed on the air on September 10, 1977; the station ran mostly religious programs, along with a blend of classic cartoons, sitcoms from the 1950s, 1960s and 1970s, and some drama series. Cameras from the Sumrall stations in Indianapolis and Miami were brought to South Bend, as WMSH did not have any color cameras.

By 1978, the station ran cartoons from 7 to 9 a.m. on weekdays. WHME ran Christian programs such as The PTL Club, The 700 Club, and locally produced Christian programs from 9 a.m. to about 1 p.m. Secular general entertainment programs ran from 1 to 7 p.m. Then after 7 p.m., WHME ran repeats of The PTL Club, The 700 Club and some of the religious shows that aired on Sundays, along with locally produced Christian programs. Saturdays consisted of Christian-themed children's programs until 9 a.m., a blend of secular cartoons and sitcoms until noon or 1 p.m., and some other family-friendly programs until 5 p.m. Christian programming continued after 6 p.m. Saturday nights and all day on Sundays (featuring televangelists such as Jerry Falwell, Jimmy Swaggart and Oral Roberts, as well as the Catholic Mass from Notre Dame). The station began broadcasting on a 24-hour schedule by 1980.

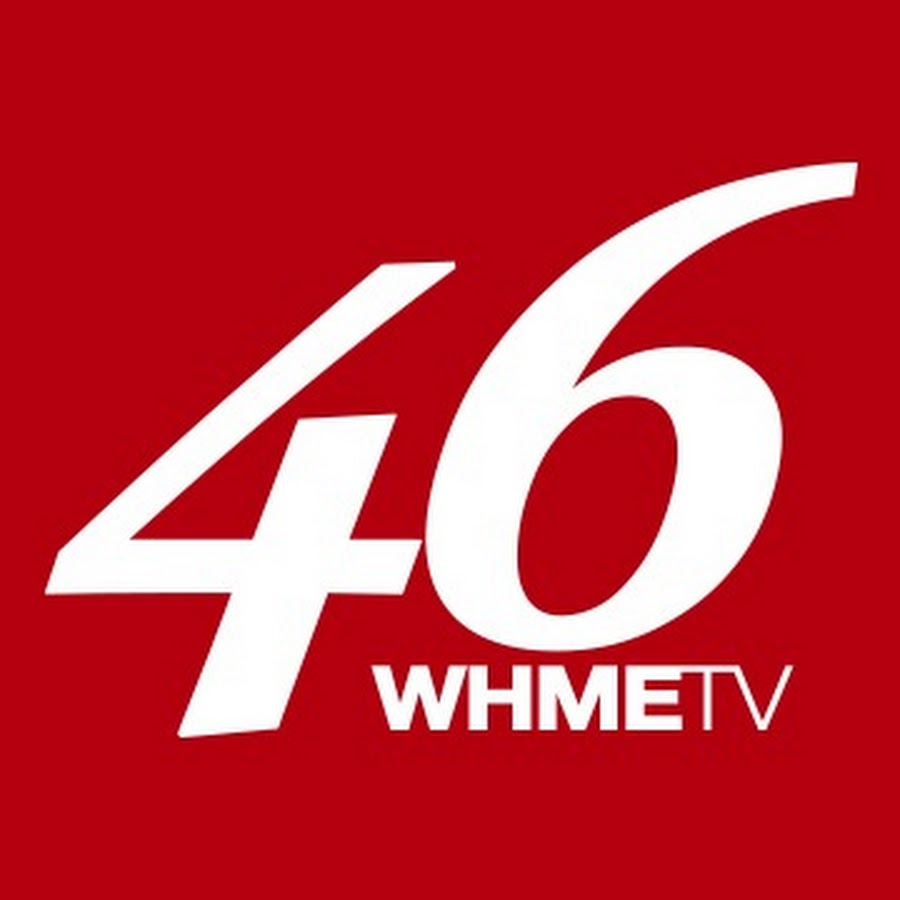
Former WHME logo, used until August 2024.

By the early 1980s, morning cartoons returned to WHME, and throughout most of the 1980s and into the early 1990s, the station aired regular children's programs on weekdays, including reruns of The Flintstones, Rocky and Bullwinkle, Underdog, and Alvin and the Chipmunks. The station later added both The Wonderful World of Disney during the late 1980s and later The Disney Afternoon animation block by the early 1990s. WHME-TV also aired the nationally syndicated evening news program, Independent Network News. By the early 1990s, more sitcoms from the 1970s and 1980s were added onto the schedule. Throughout much of 1994 and 1995, WHME carried 60 Minutes as a result of CBS affiliate WSBT-TV (channel 22) losing its rights to carry the program as a result of WSBT carrying both Fox programming and Chicago Bears football. On May 27, 1996, WHME began carrying the Kids' WB program block within its afternoon lineup when W12BK (channel 12, now WYGN-LD), switched to being a translator of ABC affiliate WBND-LP (channel 58), but unlike other LeSEA-owned stations, it declined to carry prime time programming from the block's parent network, The WB (which instead affiliated with W69BT channel 69 in October 1999, now WMYS-LD, and later moved to WMWB-LP channel 25, now WCWW-LD). In the early 2000s, WHME decreased the number of cartoons on its schedule and replaced them with more sitcoms and drama series.

In August 2024, WHME and Indianapolis sister station WHMB-TV switched their primary channels to Univision. Despite the switch, the station still airs religious programming on Sunday mornings during off-network hours.

== Technical information ==
=== Subchannels ===
The station's signal is multiplexed:

Subchannels of WHME-TV
Subchannel	Res.	Short name	Programming
46.1	720p	WHME-HD	Univision
46.2	480i	ION	Ion
46.3	480i	GRIT	Grit
46.4	480i	LAFF	Laff
46.5	480i	QVC	QVC
46.6	480i	HSN	HSN
46.7	480i	QVC2	QVC2
46.8	480i	HSN2	HSN2
28.4	720p	CourtTV	Court TV (WSJV)
28.7	480i	Rewind	Rewind TV (WSJV)

Broadcast on behalf of another station

=== Analog-to-digital conversion ===
WHME-TV shut down its analog signal, over UHF channel 46, on June 12, 2009, the official date on which full-power television stations in the United States transitioned from analog to digital broadcasts under federal mandate. The station's digital signal remained on its pre-transition UHF channel 48, using virtual channel 46.

On March 8, 2011, WHME-TV received a construction permit to move its digital operations to its former analog allotment on channel 46, due to interference with WMLW-TV in Racine, Wisconsin (which transmits from Milwaukee), a station that also broadcast its digital signal on UHF channel 48, with both stations having signal conflicts on the edges of their market areas. The conflict was resolved in January 2018 when WMLW cashed in their spectrum in the 2016 FCC auction and moved to a channel share with their sister low-power station, though WHME moved to channel 36 in 2019 as a result of the spectrum repack.

Between 2012 and sometime in early 2013, digital subchannel 46.3 was leased to Aliento Vision, a family-oriented Spanish-language network. The subchannel previously carried no content besides a card listing the channel numbers, call letters and city of license, but added Light TV to its 46.3 subchannel. In July 2020, Light TV was dropped, and QVC was added to 46.5.

=== Former translator ===
WHME-TV's signal was relayed on a repeater station serving the Chicago market, WHNW-LD (channel 18) in Gary, until the station's license was canceled on August 25, 2017.

== See also ==
- Family Broadcasting Corporation
- fetv
- WHMB-TV
- KWHE-TV
