= WHPD =

Radio station in Dowagiac, Michigan

WHPD and WHPZ

WHPD: Dowagiac, Michigan; WHPZ: Bremen, Indiana; United States
- Broadcast area: South Bend metropolitan area
- Frequencies: WHPD: 92.1 MHz (HD Radio); WHPZ: 96.9 MHz (HD Radio)
- Branding: Pulse FM 96.9/92.1/103.1

Programming
- Format: Contemporary Christian
- Subchannels: HD2: Christian talk "Harvest FM"

Ownership
- Owner: Family Broadcasting Corporation
- Sister stations: WHME

History
- First air date: WHPD: January 1971; WHPZ: March 1, 1993
- Former call signs: WHPD: WDOW-FM (1971–1994); WVHQ (1994–2000); WDOW-FM (2000–2006); WHPZ: WMJC (1990–1992); WYEZ (1992–1996)

Technical information
- Licensing authority: FCC
- Facility ID: WHPD: 69804; WHPZ: 6335
- Class: WHPD: A; WHPZ: A
- ERP: WHPD: 3,300 watts; WHPZ: 2,000 watts
- HAAT: WHPD: 91 meters (299 ft); WHPZ: 141 meters (463 ft)
- Transmitter coordinates: WHPD: 41.998°N 86.054°W; WHPZ: 41°24′43.1″N 86°1′50.9″W
- Repeater(s): 103.1 WHME (South Bend, Indiana)

Links
- Public license information: WHPD: Public file; LMS; WHPZ: Public file; LMS
- Website: www.pulsefm.com

WHPD (92.1 MHz) is an FM radio station licensed to Dowagiac, Michigan. WHPZ (96.9 MHz) is an FM radio station licensed to Bremen, Indiana. WHME (103.1 MHz) is an FM radio station licensed to South Bend, Indiana. The three stations are known as "Pulse FM" and they simulcast a Contemporary Christian radio format. They are owned by LeSEA Broadcasting, part of the Family Broadcasting Corporation, started by evangelist Lester Sumrall. LeSEA stands for the Lester Sumrall Evangelistic Association. Pulse FM serves the Michiana region of Michigan and Indiana, including South Bend and Elkhart.

All three stations are licensed for HD Radio operations and feature a Christian talk and teaching format on their HD2 side channels known as "Harvest", continuing the format formerly heard on WHME before it began to simulcast its sister stations in 2018.

== History ==
WHME, the flagship station of LeSEA, was the original host of the Christian contemporary music festival that is now known as the World Pulse Festival, which began as a free concert to celebrate WHME's 19th birthday in 1987. On December 9, 1996, WHME's Christian contemporary music format moved to WHPZ 96.9 FM. In 2018, WHME returned to its Christian contemporary format as a simulcast of Pulse FM, and its former talk and teaching format moved to the HD2 side channels of all three Pulse stations.

WHPD signed on the air in 1971. It broadcast on 97.7 MHz with the call sign WDOW-FM. It was the FM counterpart to WDOW (1440 AM), which is now defunct. WDOW-FM moved to 92.1 MHz and changed its call letters to WVHQ in 1994. (The 97.7 spot on the dial is now the home of WZOW-FM, a classic rock station in Goshen, Indiana.) WVHQ returned to the WDOW-FM call sign in 2000, continuing with its mainstream adult contemporary music format as "Q92". LeSea Broadcasting bought the station in February 2005 for $950,000. It became WHPD in 2006, as a Christian contemporary music station.

WHPZ signed on the air on March 1, 1993. Its call letters were WYEZ, owned by WMRI, Inc. The station aired an easy listening format. In January 2000, it was bought by LeSea Broadcasting for $280,296. LeSea switched the format to contemporary Christian music.

== Sources ==
- Michiguide.com - WHPD History
