= WBCQ =

WBCQ may refer to:

- WBCQ (SW), a shortwave radio station operating from Monticello, Maine, United States
- WBCQ-FM, a radio station (94.7 FM) licensed to Monticello, Maine, United States
