= WHME =

WHME may refer to:

- WHME (FM), a radio station (103.1 FM) licensed to South Bend, Indiana, United States
- WHME-TV, a television station (channel 36, virtual 46) licensed to South Bend, Indiana, United States
