= WXME =

- Monticello, Maine; United States
- Broadcast area: Aroostook County, Maine
- Frequency: 780 kHz
- Branding: 98.3 The Ride

Programming
- Language: English
- Format: Oldies
- Affiliations: USA Radio Network, Genesis Communications Network

Ownership
- Owner: Allan Weiner
- Sister stations: WBCQ, WBCQ-FM

History
- First air date: February 2, 1981 (as WOZW)
- Former call signs: WOZW (1981–1987); WREM (1987–2007); WCXH (2007–2008)
- Former frequencies: 710 kHz (1981–2007)

Technical information
- Licensing authority: FCC
- Facility ID: 17514
- Class: D
- Power: 5,000 watts (daytime); 60 watts (nighttime)
- Transmitter coordinates: 46°20′30″N 67°49′4″W
- Translator: 98.3 W252DW (Monticello)

Links
- Public license information: Public file; LMS
- Webcast: Listen Live (TuneIn); Listen Live (MP3)

WXME (780 AM) is a radio station located in Monticello, Maine, United States, serving the Northern Maine market and broadcasts an oldies format. The station is owned and operated by Allan Weiner, who also owns the shortwave station WBCQ. WXME's broadcast facilities are co-located with WBCQ shortwave and WBCQ-FM 94.7.

== History ==
WXME was formerly known as WCXH 780, WREM 710, and WOZW 710.

WREM broadcast a variety of formats ranging from classic rock and alternative rock to talk radio and religious programming. For a number of years, WREM simulcasted talk radio from WEGP.

In the summer of 2007, the station moved to 780 kHz, increased power to 5,000 watts daytime non-directional and 60 watts nighttime non-directional, and changed its call sign to WCXH, simulcasting Channel X Radio from Caribou, Maine.

By 2008, WCXH had dropped the Channel X Radio simulcast; on September 10, 2008, the station changed its call letters to WXME. In 2009 the station carried a talk radio format largely from Fox News Radio. From March 2010 to July 2010 the station simulcasted Central Maine-based WSKW's oldies format before reverting to the previous News/Talk format. In February 2011 the station returned to a simulcast of WEGP. In the summer of 2014 WXME changed to an oldies/classic hits format before reverting to a News/Talk format in early 2015. Later, in 2018, WXME obtained a license for an FM translator on 98.3 FM. Since then, the station has broadcast a news/talk format during the daylight hours and rock music at night.

On May 15, 2025, WXME changed their format from talk/rock to oldies, branded as "98.3 The Ride".

Broadcast translator for WXME
Call sign	Frequency	City of license	FID	ERP (W)	HAAT	Class	FCC info
W252DW	98.3 FM	Monticello, Maine	201363	175	0 m (0 ft)	D	LMS

== Previous logo ==
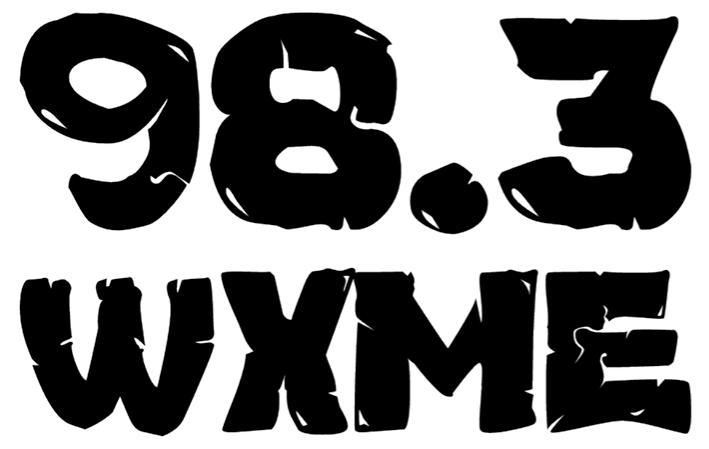
