= KWHB =

Television station in Tulsa, Oklahoma

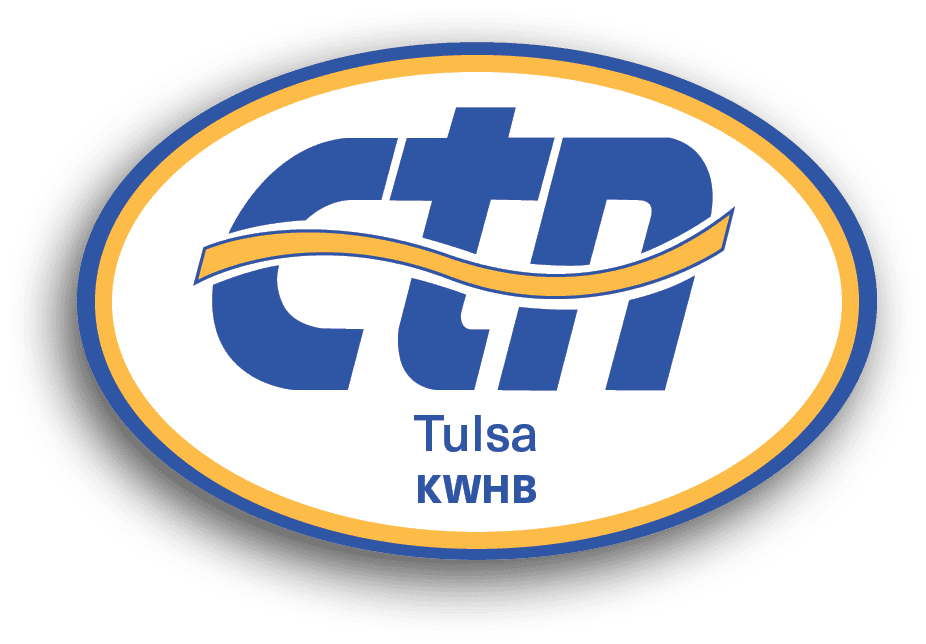
- Tulsa, Oklahoma; United States
- Channels: Digital: 16 (UHF); Virtual: 47
- Branding: CTN Tulsa

Programming
- Affiliations: 47.1: CTN; for others, see § Subchannels

Ownership
- Owner: Christian Television Network; (Christian Television Corporation, Inc.)

History
- First air date: June 3, 1985
- Former call signs: KTCT (1985–1986)
- Former channel numbers: Analog: 47 (UHF, 1985–2009); Digital: 48 (UHF, 2002–2019)
- Former affiliations: Religious Independent (1985–1986, 2018–2020); LeSEA (1986–2018); The WB (secondary, 1995–1999)
- Call sign meaning: World Harvest Broadcasting (reference to former owner, LeSEA / Family Broadcasting Corporation)

Technical information
- Licensing authority: FCC
- Facility ID: 37099
- ERP: 26 kW
- HAAT: 182.4 m (598 ft)
- Transmitter coordinates: 36°2′35″N 95°57′12″W

Links
- Public license information: Public file; LMS
- Website: www.ctnonline.com/affiliate-stations/ctn-tulsa-kwhb/

KWHB (channel 47) is a religious television station in Tulsa, Oklahoma, United States, owned by the Christian Television Network (CTN). The station's studios are located on Yellowood Avenue in Broken Arrow, and it transmits from atop the CityPlex Towers (located south of the Oral Roberts University campus).

== History ==
=== Early history ===
The non-commercial UHF channel 47 allocation was contested between two groups that vied to hold the construction permit to build a new station on the frequency. The first prospective permittee was the David Livingstone Missionary Foundation, a nonprofit religious corporation headed by Billy James Hargis, a Tulsa-born evangelist, who founded American Christian College; the foundation filed an application with the Federal Communications Commission (FCC) on April 17, 1978. The second applicant, Alden Communications Corporation, filed its own application on September 5. The FCC granted the license to the Livingstone Missionary Foundation on December 12, 1979. After vying for the construction permit for a year-and-a-half, Alden and the Livingstone Foundation proposed consolidating their respective permit applications. Following a March 1980 hearing in which the FCC determined issues regarding the respective licensing proposals, the Hargis group (which by that time, had transferred the permit application to another of his organizations, Church of Christian Crusade, Inc. [CCC]) was granted the permit that winter, despite issues that Alden had raised against CCC in part over possible rule violations in its attempts to discourage public file inspections. Hargis planned to sign on the station by Christmas of 1981. CCC applied for its station to use KBJH-TV as its callsign, applying the calls that the Livingstone Foundation used on its Christian radio station on 98.5 FM, KBJH (now KVOO-FM). That request was protested by the Scripps-Howard Broadcasting, which contested that the assignment would create confusion with Scripps-owned NBC affiliate KJRH-TV (channel 2); however, the FCC Broadcast Bureau stated that calls were sufficiently different to prevent confusion in part because KJRH was a VHF station, and granted CCC use of the callsign in January 1982.

In October 1983, Church of the Christian Crusade sold an 85% interest in the permit to Oral Roberts University (ORU) for 85% of FCC-approved expenditures totaling $255,000; the FCC granted approval of the transaction on January 12, 1984. However, ORU would later back out of the transaction that spring, at which time CCC was granted its next set of calls for the channel 47 permit, KDLF-TV (after the organization's radio station in Port Neches, Texas, now KBPO). The permit changed hands once again in July 1984, when CCC sold the permit to Television Communications Inc. (owned by local minister Jack Rehburg) for $410,000; Rehburg subsequently planned to call its proposed station KTCT (for "Tulsa Christian Television", which had served as the branding for KGCT-TV [channel 41, later KTFO and now MyNetworkTV affiliate KMYT-TV] when Rehburg maintained a time-leasing agreement with that station from 1984 to 1985).

After the Rehburg group backed out of the sale, the permit would finally find a buyer who would sign on the station in the fall of 1984, when the permit was sold to San Francisco–based Coit Drapery and Cleaners, Inc. Channel 47, as KTCT, first signed on the air on June 3, 1985. Operating as a religious independent station, it originally maintained studio facilities located at East 58th Street and South Garnett Road in southeastern Tulsa (0.1 miles [0.16 km] east of the then-studio facility of KGCT). Its initial schedule consisted of Christian programming from the PTL Satellite Network, including shows such as The PTL Club, Heritage Village USA and 100 Huntley Street, as well as programs from televangelists such as Kenneth Copeland, Jerry Falwell, Jimmy Swaggart and Richard Roberts. KTCT suffered from financial problems early on, and reduced its programming schedule to approximately six hours a day by that winter. Coit Drapery and Cleaners opted to put KTCT up for sale there, and wanted to sell the station to a Christian religious broadcast ministry.

=== LeSEA ownership ===
In April 1986, South Bend, Indiana–based LeSEA Evangelistic Ministries (eventually renamed Family Broadcasting Corporation in June 2018) – an organization headed by Lester Sumrall and sons Frank, Phillip and Peter Sumrall – purchased the station from Coit for $3.4 million. After the acquisition was finalized in the fall of 1986, LeSEA changed the station's call letters to KWHB (standing for "World Harvest Broadcasting"). The station initially retained some PTL programming and added other religious programs in the ministry's inventory and original programs (such as The 700 Club, LeSEA Alive, Lester Sumrall Teaches and televangelism programs from pastors such as Dwight Thompson, Ernest Angley and Jack Van Impe). By 1987, KWHB also added secular family-oriented entertainment programming on weekday afternoons between 2 and 7 p.m. and from 9 a.m. to 6 p.m. on Saturdays; at the time, it began selling airtime during its secular programming to local and national advertisers to run commercials during program breaks.

After KGCT began a two-year operational cessation in February 1989, in order to allow original owner Green Country Associates to weigh sale offers for the station, KWHB acquired a selection of cartoon shorts and animated series that channel 41 previously carried on its schedule. As time went on, KWHB carried a broad mix of various syndicated programs including classic and some recent sitcoms (such as The Adventures of Ozzie & Harriet, Mister Ed, The Little Rascals, Dennis The Menace (both the live-action sitcom and the animated series), The Brady Bunch, I Love Lucy, The Andy Griffith Show and The Cosby Show), westerns (such as Bonanza), and animated series (such as The Jetsons, Yogi's Gang and DuckTales); it also carried a mixture of movies and sporting events on weekends. Televangelist and church service programming by this time typically aired during the prime time and overnight hours and throughout most of its Sunday lineup. Although the station ran a decent amount of general entertainment programming, the Tulsa edition of TV Guide never included KWHB in its listings for undisclosed reasons, an unusual situation given that the magazine had provided listings for full-time Christian television stations in its other regional editions.

During the 1990s, KWHB also began producing several local programs such as the public affairs program 47 Family Magazine, and ministerial programs like Life on the Vine, Full Gospel House of Prayer and Through the Bible with Les Feldick (the latter of which was syndicated to other television stations throughout Oklahoma and surrounding states); one such show, the Contemporary Christian music video program EQ Video, was syndicated to all eleven television stations that LeSEA owned at that time. On July 11, 1993, Tele-Communications, Inc. (TCI) – which, as a byproduct of a corporate breakup tied to AT&T's 1999 purchase of TCI, would sell its Tulsa cable franchise to Cox Communications in February 2000 – began offering KWHB on channel 7, which expanded the station's distribution to cable television subscribers in the Tulsa area; KWHB was one of three Tulsa-area stations (along with KTFO and Claremore-based educational independent KRSC-TV [channel 35, now KRSU-TV]) to be given clearance on TCI as a result of rules included in the Cable Television Protection and Competition Act that allowed full-power television stations to elect for mandatory carriage on cable providers.

KWHB became a part-time network affiliate on January 11, 1995, when it initiated a rather informal charter affiliation with The WB at that network's launch. Channel 47 initially carried the network's family-oriented prime time shows (such as 7th Heaven, The Parent 'Hood, Smart Guy and Sister, Sister) and, beginning with its debut that September, animated series from the network's children's program block, Kids' WB, on weekday afternoons and Saturday mornings. However, because of LeSEA Broadcasting's ministerial structure, the strict content guidelines that the group maintained for secular programs carried on its stations resulted in KWHB refusing to clear prime time network shows that contained strong profanity, violent or sexual content (such as Unhappily Ever After, Savannah, Charmed and Buffy the Vampire Slayer) on the belief that they would offend the sensibilities of channel 47's mostly Christian and Evangelical viewership; these programs were substituted with either ministry and televangelist programs or secular syndicated programs already in LeSEA's inventory or sports. Originally, this was not a significant issue as the preempted programs could be seen in the market via the superstation feed of Chicago WB affiliate WGN-TV (now standalone cable channel NewsNation) on most of the area's cable and satellite providers.

Local cable provider TCI dropped WGN from its lineup on December 31, 1996, when WGN, The Nashville Network and BET were removed to make room for five channels not previously carried on TCI's Tulsa system (Cartoon Network, TLC, Animal Planet, ESPN2 and HGTV). While this cut off access to the KWHB-preempted WB programs carried on the superstation feed to TCI's approximately 170,000 subscribers in the Tulsa area, it remained available locally on Heartland Cable Television, DirecTV, Dish Network and PrimeStar. WGN was particularly vulnerable to removal as it had lost access to much of the Chicago Bulls' 1996–97 game schedule due to a dispute between its Tulsa-based distributor, United Video Satellite Group (co-founded by Ed Taylor and Roy Bliss, founders of local TCI predecessor Tulsa Cable Television), and the National Basketball Association (NBA) over WGN's carriage of the team's telecasts outside of the Chicago market (TCI did not include its Oklahoma systems among those that retained the WGN national feed per an agreement reached with United Video that December, which kept the channel available on TCI in five Midwestern states). The WB began to regret affiliating with a conservative religious station because of LeSEA's preemption policies, and began making plans to move its programming elsewhere. Muskogee-based KWBT (channel 19, now CW affiliate KQCW-DT) took over as the market's WB affiliate when it bowed on September 12, 1999, carrying The WB's entire prime time schedule (including the few shows that KWHB carried beforehand) as well as the Kids' WB lineup. (For the reasons concerning The WB's prior partnership with KWHB, in preparation for the network's fall 1999 premiere week, KWBT included some returning WB prime time shows that station had declined to carry, as part of an evening catch-up block that aired during the week of September 12.)

In August 1998, LeSEA Broadcasting and KWHB were fined up to $12,000 by the Federal Communications Commission for exceeded Children's Television Act advertising limits (which restrict programming time allocated to commercials to 12 minutes per hour on weekdays and 10½ minutes per hour on weekends) during children's programs that aired on the station a total of 47 times between July 13, 1996, and December 1, 1997. In a notice of apparent liability for forfeiture, the FCC noted that the station noted on its last renewal application that it had exceeded the guidelines by anywhere between 15 and 95 seconds during the cited incidents. The station cited in an application for its prior license renewal that the violations resulted from "inadvertence and/or human error stemming from the failure of KWHB's personnel to detect, over the course of more than a year, a computer error responsible for the commercial overages," and issue that the Commission has "repeatedly rejected" as a reasoning for advertising time violations in the past. In 2001, KWHB moved to new studio facilities located on South Memorial Drive (north of East 91st Street) in southeastern Tulsa.

Former KWHB logo, used from 2008 until June 2018.

On May 4, 1999, transmission lines at KWHB's Coweta transmitter facility were knocked out due to intense lightning related to severe thunderstorms associated with a storm system that produced 66 tornadoes across the central third of Oklahoma on May 3. KWHB's signal was taken offline on May 8, due to a steady decrease in power to the transmission lines, as station engineers were preparing to remove and replace the lines and their internal electrical conductors. On that date, TCI regained access to the station at its northeastern Oklahoma headends after repairs to the direct fiber optic studio feed were completed. KWHB's over-the-air signal returned to the air on May 19.

Former KWHB logo, used from June 2018 until March 2020.

By 2012, KWHB had reduced its secular programming slightly (consisting of sitcoms, drama series and lifestyle programs) to 3 to 7 p.m. each weekday, with a scattering of secular shows airing for a few hours each Saturday and for up to an hour on Sundays, along with a three-hour-long block of children's programs compliant with FCC educational programming guidelines on Saturday mornings. In September 2017, following similar scheduling changes at LeSEA's other stations, KWHB was repositioned as a family-oriented entertainment station. Secular shows were now more than half the schedule. Its schedule was revamped to consist mostly of off-network reruns of sitcoms and drama series made from the 1950s to present during the afternoon and evening hours, a late-night block of westerns, and first-run syndicated court and lifestyle shows on weekday early afternoons and weekend afternoons; religious programming was relegated to weekday mornings between 7:30 a.m. and noon, but continue to make up the majority of its Sunday lineup.

=== Christian Television Network ownership ===
On October 22, 2019, Family Broadcasting Corporation announced it would sell KWHB to Clearwater, Florida–based Christian Television Corp. (owned and headed by Robert D'Andrea) for $2.1 million. The sale included only the license, transmitter, other equipment, and real estate. It excluded sales and programming contracts as well as employment contracts. This would mean all programming from KWHB would be dropped and the station would convert to CTN shows full time (some of which also aired previously on KWHB under different contracts). The sale received FCC approval on January 13, 2020, and was finalized one month later on February 20. On March 1, 1 1/2 weeks after the purchase's closure, channel 47 converted into an owned-and-operated station of the Christian Television Network; this resulted in KWHB becoming the third full-time, full-power religious station in the Tulsa market, alongside Bartlesville-licensed TBN owned-and-operated station KDOR-TV (channel 17) and Oral Roberts University-owned religious independent KGEB (channel 53). (CTN had gained O&Os in Las Vegas, Colorado Springs and New Orleans through a previous sale involving LeSEA in April 2018.)

== Past programming ==
=== News programming ===
In November 1995, KWHB entered into a news share agreement with KJRH-TV to produce twice-daily news and weather updates each weekday at 5:55 and 6:29 p.m. The five-minute-long updates utilized the same anchors as those seen on KJRH's 5 and 6 p.m. newscasts. These news updates continued to air until the agreement concluded in 1998.

=== Sports programming ===
Since coming under LeSEA ownership in the late 1980s, channel 47 has carried various local and syndicated sporting events. The station carried weekly high school football games involving teams from northeastern Oklahoma high schools on Friday nights in the fall of 1989; it expanded high school sports coverage expanded in January 1990, when KWHB began carrying a high school basketball "game-of-the-week" each Friday evening. Most of the games were broadcast on tape delay in late night on the night the game was held, though most games began to be televised live in 2005. In addition, starting in 2000, the station maintained a contract with Jenks High School to telecast games involving the Jenks Trojans football and basketball teams. From 1992 to 1999, KWHB held the local broadcast rights to televise NFL preseason games involving the Dallas Cowboys. From 1992 to 1995, the station also carried tape-delayed broadcasts of Central Hockey League games featuring the Tulsa Oilers.

From 1988 to 1998, channel 47 carried regular season and postseason college basketball and football games involving various local and regional teams including the Tulsa Golden Hurricane (through Creative Sports/ESPN Plus's contract with the Missouri Valley Conference and, then with Tulsa's member conference after 1996, the Western Athletic Conference, along with several 2005 regular season games that KWHB produced in conjunction with College Sports Television), the Oral Roberts Golden Eagles and the Oklahoma Sooners, as well as select NCAA tournament appearances involving at least some of those teams distributed via syndication partners of those teams or through CBS (for network-televised games conflicting with those carried on KOTV [channel 6]). Prior to being added by the provider, KWHB also fed select telecasts of NCAA men's basketball tournament games to Tulsa Cable Television and its successors United Artists Cable and TCI (such as the first-round men's basketball tournament game between the Sooners and the East Tennessee State Buccaneers in March 1989, and the March 1991 Missouri Valley Conference tournament game between Tulsa and the Wichita State Shockers). From 1993 to 2014, channel 47 held the partial local rights to the Southeastern Conference syndication package by Jefferson-Pilot Communications and Raycom Sports, carrying regular season college football and basketball games as well as the SEC men's basketball tournament.

From 1997 to 1999, KWHB carried outlaw and championship sprint car races held at Tulsa Speedway (which closed in 2005) each weekend during the track's auto racing season. From 1999 to 2004, the station carried regular season and occasional playoff minor league baseball games involving the Tulsa Drillers. The agreement marked the first time that the Drillers had their games aired on local television since 1994 (when TCI discontinued an exclusive contract with the team to carry its games on the provider's two community access channels, with select games airing regionally on Home Sports Entertainment [HSE]), and the first time since 1982 that the team's games were carried over-the-air locally (when ABC affiliate KTUL (channel 8) and then-independent station KOKI-TV (channel 23, now a Fox affiliate) carried an approximately 20-game regular season package that year). For the final year of the contract, KWHB carried most of the team's 2004 regular season games, though declining ratings resulted in the station cancelling plans to air the last two scheduled Drillers broadcasts at the end of the season.

In April 2001, KWHB obtained the broadcast rights to carry AF2 games involving the Tulsa Talons, beginning with the arena football league's 2001 season. The station initially aired the Talons' regular season games on a tape-delayed basis; KWHB began to televise several of the team's games live in 2003. Talons co-owner Henry Primeaux cited KWHB's telecasts of the entire 16-game regular season in 2005 in part for helping increasing ticket sales by 14% and raising attendance by 8.3% (an average of 44,722, up from 41,292 in 2004) over the previous year. The Talons transferred their local broadcasts exclusively to KWBT for the 2005 season. The Talons returned to channel 47 on a one-time-only basis in August 2007, when it telecast their appearance in that year's ArenaCup championship game against the Wilkes-Barre/Scranton Pioneers. (The team's vice president and general manager at that time, Bill Paddock, incidentally served as general manager for KWHB from 1999 to 2005.) From 2005 to 2007, the station also carried select regular season and exhibition National Basketball Development League games involving the Tulsa 66ers (which became the Oklahoma City Blue upon its relocation downstate to Oklahoma City in 2014).

== Technical information ==
=== Subchannels ===
The station's signal is multiplexed:

Subchannels of KWHB
Subchannel	Res.	Short name	Programming
47.1	1080i	KWHB-D1	CTN
47.2	480i	Life	CTN Lifestyle
47.3	480i	CTNi	CTN International (4:3)
47.4	480i	N2	Newsmax2
47.5	480i	BIZ-TV	Biz TV

=== Analog-to-digital conversion ===
KWHB began transmitting a digital television signal on UHF channel 48 on February 21, 2003. The station shut down its analog signal, over UHF channel 47, on February 17, 2009 (the original target date for full-power television stations in the United States to transition from analog to digital broadcasts under federal mandate (which Congress had moved the previous month to June 12 to allow additional time for consumers unprepared for the changeover to make necessary precautions to continue receiving broadcast stations). The station's digital channel assignment was relocated from its pre-transition allocation on UHF channel 48 to its former analog-era allocation, UHF channel 47.
