= WBND-LD =

Television station in South Bend, Indiana

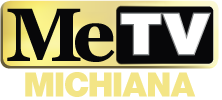
- South Bend, Indiana; United States
- Channels: Digital: 35 (UHF); Virtual: 57
- Branding: ABC 57

Programming
- Affiliations: 57.1: ABC; 57.2: MeTV; 57.3: Movies!

Ownership
- Owner: Weigel Broadcasting Company
- Sister stations: WCWW-LD, WMYS-LD

History
- Founded: June 26, 1995
- First air date: October 18, 1995
- Former call signs: W58BT (October–December 1995)
- Former channel numbers: Analog: 58 (UHF, 1995–2002), 57 (UHF, 2002–2010); Digital: 49 (UHF, 2007–2012), 34 (UHF, 2012–2019)
- Former affiliations: Secondary: UPN (1995–2003)
- Call sign meaning: South Bend

Technical information
- Licensing authority: FCC
- Facility ID: 71426
- Class: LD
- ERP: 15 kW
- HAAT: 320.2 m (1,051 ft)
- Transmitter coordinates: 41°36′54.9″N 86°11′6.6″W

Links
- Public license information: LMS
- Website: www.abc57.com

WBND-LD (channel 57) is a low-power television station in South Bend, Indiana, United States, affiliated with ABC. It is owned by Weigel Broadcasting (as the company's only ABC affiliate), and is sister to WCWW-LD (channel 25), an affiliate of The CW, and WMYS-LD (channel 69). The three stations share studios on Generations Drive (near the Indiana Toll Road) in northeastern South Bend; WBND-LD's transmitter is located just off the St. Joseph Valley Parkway on the city's south side.

Due to its low-power status, its broadcasting radius only covers the immediate South Bend area. Therefore, Weigel relies on paid television subscription carriage for all three of its South Bend television stations to reach the entire market.

== History ==
The station signed on the air on October 18, 1995, the date that longtime ABC station WSJV (channel 28) became Michiana's new Fox affiliate, as W58BT, originally broadcasting on UHF channel 58. However, from the beginning, it branded itself under the fictional call letters "WBND", relegating mentions of its legal call sign to station identifications, and signed on as the area's new ABC affiliate in Michiana. Prior to the launch, Fox won the rights to NFL football games starting with the 1994 season, and the network signed an affiliation agreement with Quincy Newspapers to have WSJV join Fox on April 21, 1995; prior to this, some Fox programming (including its NFL game telecasts) had been airing on CBS affiliate WSBT-TV (channel 22), while the network's full schedule was only available on cable via network-owned WFLD from Chicago or WFFT from Fort Wayne (on the Indiana side), and WXMI from Grand Rapids or, until late 1994, WKBD from Detroit (on the Michigan side). ABC approached WNDU-TV (channel 16) and WSBT, but both had firm affiliation deals with NBC and CBS, respectively. The only other viable choice was WHME-TV (channel 46), but that station's owner, religious broadcaster LeSEA, never even considered putting it up for sale or taking a network affiliation.

With just weeks to go before WSJV was due to join Fox, it appeared that ABC would be left without an affiliate in Michiana. Facing the prospect of piping in network-owned WLS-TV in Chicago, WPTA in Fort Wayne, and WOTV in Battle Creek, Michigan, for cable viewers, ABC agreed more or less by default to sign an affiliation deal with W58BT. This was the second 11th-hour affiliation deal Weigel had reached as a result of the massive network switches of 1994–95; sister station WDJT-TV in Milwaukee (by coincidence, also on channel 58) had become a CBS affiliate under similar circumstances in 1994.

Weigel would have preferred to sign on the station in December, when it planned to bring a new transmitter online that would have increased channel 58's footprint to a 40-mile (64 km) radius of South Bend. However, ABC officials insisted that the swap be made on the day WSJV joined Fox. Due in part to the rush to get ready for the switch, the station's 2,000-watt transmitter suffered a partial failure on the morning of October 18, rendering it almost unviewable. However, Weigel managed to keep ABC programming available via W69BT, which became a satellite of W58BT. The transmitter was fixed within a few days.

By the end of that year, the station changed its call letters to WBND-LP. During the late 1990s, the station carried UPN programming outside of network hours as a secondary affiliate. The station relocated to UHF channel 57 in 2002, after WSJV received approval from the Federal Communications Commission (FCC) to use channel 58 for its digital signal. In 2003, the station's UPN affiliate ended with that network's move to WSBT-TV's second digital subchannel, known as "UPN Michiana", which programmed the network in regular prime time hours.

Ultimately, WBND would outlast WSJV, when in August 2016, "SBT2" (which had carried an independent format after UPN's demise) assumed the market's Fox affiliation from WSJV as "Fox Michiana". WSJV then positioned themselves to try to sell their broadcast spectrum in the 2016 auction, but were ultimately unsuccessful, and now carries Weigel's Heroes & Icons network on their main channel.

In early August 2008, Weigel Broadcasting agreed to sell all three of its South Bend stations, including WBND, to Schurz Communications, founding owner of WSBT-TV, for undisclosed terms. If this sale had been approved by the FCC, WBND's operations would have been moved into WSBT's new facility in Mishawaka (which opened in November 2008) and it may have resulted in the WDJT-produced newscast on channel 57 being replaced by simulcasts of WSBT-TV's newscasts. However, after the FCC failed to approve the deal within a year, Weigel and Schurz walked away from the deal in August 2009.

From June to July 2011, the station's website was redirected to WBND's Facebook account as Weigel's web staff undertook a major rebuilding of both WDJT and WBND's websites (WDJT's original site remained operational, while WBND's was taken down completely). During this time, the station unusually reported current weather conditions using map imagery uploaded through its on-staff meteorologists via their Twitter accounts to the TwitPic service and the station's Facebook photos section. The station debuted its new website by the start of August 2011.

== Programming ==
=== Sports programming ===
WBND-LD carries the road games of Notre Dame football which air as part of the ESPN College Football on ABC package, either as a part of its regular schedule or games against Atlantic Coast Conference opponents (including the 2020 ACC Championship Game as part of that year's temporary conference affiliation); WNDU-TV (formerly owned by the university itself until its 2005 sale to Gray Television) has carried the team's home games since 1990 as NBC holds exclusive rights to the team's regular season home games. Channel 57 aired its first ever Notre Dame home football game, an intrastate matchup and win against the Indiana Hoosiers, on December 20, 2024, as part of ESPN's coverage of the first round of that year's inaugural 12-team College Football Playoff.

=== News operation ===
WBND-LD currently broadcasts 31 hours of local newscasts each week (with 4 1/2 hours each on Mondays through Saturdays and four hours on Sundays); in addition to the newscasts seen on WBND, the station produces and airs 13 1/2 hours of news a week for CW affiliate WCWW-LD (with 2 1/2 hours each weekday and a half-hour each on Saturdays and Sundays). Unlike most ABC stations in the Eastern Time Zone, the station does not produce a midday newscast on weekdays. WBND-LD's news operation has no sports department.

The station ran an abbreviated 11-minute-long newscast at 11 p.m. from 2007 to April 2011, using a form of the Eleven @ 11:00 news format, with The Insider filling out the timeslot following the newscast until 11:35 p.m. The newscast was produced and anchored by staff at WDJT, and featured emphasis on a weather forecast segment within the first ten minutes, under the "First Alert Weather" branding. WBND was the third Weigel station to carry a newscast produced by WDJT, the others being their Milwaukee sister stations WMLW-CA and WYTU-LD. Local news footage was shot by photographers in South Bend, and then transmitted to WDJT's studios in Milwaukee via satellite. WDJT's reporters and anchors then edited the video and added voiceovers, before sending the completed program back to South Bend.

In November 2010, Weigel began to seek applicants for reporting, anchoring and web content positions to be locally based in South Bend, suggesting the station was looking to start a standalone news operation. On April 4, 2011, the station officially launched its news operation and began broadcasting locally produced daily newscasts at 6 a.m., 6 p.m. and 11 p.m. This made WBND one of the few low-powered television stations to operate an in-house news department. The newscasts air in high definition, though in downscaled 4:3 on its analog low-power signal until that channel went dark later that year.

In September 2011, WBND-LD added an additional hour to its weekday morning newscast at 5 a.m. and launched two half-hour newscasts: one at 7 p.m. on Monday through Saturday evenings and a newscast at 6 p.m. on Saturdays (replacing the 6:30 p.m. newscast previously seen on that night). The station launched an hour-long 5 p.m. newscast on September 10, 2012, simultaneously discontinuing the 7 p.m. newscast on weeknights (the station continued production of the Saturday edition of the 7 p.m. newscast). In September 2014, the station expanded its weekday morning newscast by a half-hour to 4:30 a.m., and debuted a two-hour extension of the program from 7 to 9 a.m. on WCWW-LD; WBND also debuted three hours of newscasts on weekend mornings, with a two-hour block running from 6 to 8 a.m. on both Saturday and Sunday, and an additional hour on Saturdays from 9 to 10 a.m. and on Sundays from 10 to 11 a.m.

== Technical information ==
=== Subchannels ===
The station's signal is multiplexed:

Subchannels of WBND-LD
Channel	Res.	Short name	Programming
57.1	720p	ABC57	ABC
57.2	720p	MeTV	MeTV
57.3	480i	MOVIES	Movies!

On June 2, 2011, WBND launched its second digital subchannel on 57.2 as an owned-and-operated MeTV station. On December 17, 2013, Movies! was added to 57.3.

=== Analog-to-digital conversion ===
WBND received a construction permit from FCC on March 21, 2007, for a companion digital channel. Six months later on September 14, 2007, the station began broadcasting its high definition digital signal on UHF channel 49, using virtual channel 57. The station had been providing an HD feed to local cable providers for over a year prior to the launch of the over-the-air digital signal to provide ABC programming in high definition.

On May 29, 2012, the FCC granted WBND-LD a permit to move its digital signal from UHF channel 49 to channel 39. On August 19, WBND-LD swapped digital frequencies with WMYS-LD, with WBND taking WMYS's proposed channel 34 allotment and WMYS taking the channel 39 allotment. The newly reassigned digital RF channels went on the air on August 19, replacing the previous digital signals.
