= WMYS-LD =

Television station in South Bend, Indiana

- South Bend, Indiana; United States
- Channels: Digital: 28 (UHF); Virtual: 69
- Branding: My Michiana; Telemundo Michiana (69.2)

Programming
- Affiliations: 69.1: Heroes & Icons (primary); MyNetworkTV (secondary); 69.2: Telemundo; for others, see § Subchannels

Ownership
- Owner: Weigel Broadcasting; (WBND-TV Limited Partnership)
- Sister stations: WBND-LD; WCWW-LD

History
- First air date: December 2, 1987
- Former call signs: W69BT (1987–1999); WMWB-LP (1999–2002); WRDY-LP (2002–2004); WAAT-LP (2004–March 2006); WCWW-LP (March 2006); WMYT-LP (March–April 2006)
- Former channel numbers: Analog: 69 (UHF, 1987–2010); Digital: 23 (UHF, 2007–2012), 39 (UHF, 2012–2018), 33 (UHF, 2018–2019)
- Former affiliations: Independent (via WCIU-TV, 1987–1995; sole affiliation, 2004–2006); Telemundo (secondary, via WCIU-TV, 1987–1988); Univision (secondary, via WCIU-TV, 1989–1994); ABC (via WBND-LP; 1995–1999, 2002–2004); UPN (secondary, 1995–2003); The WB (1999–2002); The Sportsman Channel (secondary, 2004–2009)
- Call sign meaning: MyNetworkTV South Bend

Technical information
- Licensing authority: FCC
- Facility ID: 168647
- Class: LD
- ERP: 15 kW
- HAAT: 334.2 m (1,096 ft)
- Transmitter coordinates: 41°36′54.9″N 86°11′6.6″W

Links
- Public license information: LMS
- Website: www.mymichianatv.com

WMYS-LD (channel 69) is a low-power television station in South Bend, Indiana, United States, owned by Weigel Broadcasting. It carries Weigel's diginet Heroes & Icons, and has a secondary affiliation with MyNetworkTV. WMYS-LD is sister to ABC affiliate WBND-LD (channel 57) and CW affiliate WCWW-LD (channel 25) and the three stations share studios on Generations Drive (near the Indiana Toll Road) in northeastern South Bend; WMYS-LD's transmitter is located just off the St. Joseph Valley Parkway on the city's south side.

Due to its low-power status, its broadcasting radius only covers the immediate South Bend area. Therefore, Weigel relies on paid television subscription carriage for all three of its South Bend television stations to reach the entire market.

== History ==
The station first signed on the air on December 2, 1987, as W69BT, broadcasting on UHF channel 69. It originally operated as a translator of Chicago sister station WCIU-TV, which at the time was an independent station with Telemundo as a secondary affiliation. On October 18, 1995, W58BT (channel 58, now WBND-LD on channel 57) became the South Bend market's new ABC affiliate, after full-power WSJV (channel 28) ended its affiliation with that network to join Fox. Due to W58BT's low-power signal which could not reach the entire market, Weigel then converted W69BT into a translator of W58BT to reach areas that could not receive an adequate signal as Weigel campaigned the FCC to increase the station's signal radius, along with establishing its pay-TV coverage.

After several years, those efforts were successful. As most of the market could receive channel 57 without issue, in October 1999, channel 69 became an affiliate of The WB with its own schedule, just as WGN-TV in Chicago dropped The WB on its superstation feed. The station's callsign was changed to WMWB-LP (standing for "Michiana's WB").

After Weigel purchased WYGN-LP (channel 25, now CW affiliate WCWW-LD) in 2002 from 3ABN, Weigel chose to move channel 69's schedule, call letters, and WB affiliation to that station, which was closer to the majority of the channels on the South Bend television dial. Channel 69 then adopted channel 25's former WRDY-LP call letters. It later changed its calls three more times: first to WAAT-LP in 2004, then briefly to WCWW-LP in March 2006. From 2002 until 2004, it was once again simulcasting ABC programming from WBND-LP; after that, it returned to being an independent station, with occasional programming from the Sportsman Channel.

In March 2006, Weigel reached an affiliation deal to affiliate channel 69 with MyNetworkTV, a network launched as a partnership between Fox Television Stations and Twentieth Television; in accordance to the new affiliation, it changed its calls to WMYT-LP before modifying it to WMYS-LP in April 2006. WMYS affiliated with MyNetworkTV when it launched on September 5, 2006. Until 2011, when MeTV launched on WBND-LD2, the station carried classic television series and retro commercials associated with MeTV's stations in Chicago, though without the branding due to its network affiliation and a sizeable amount of recent first-run programming within WMYS-LP's schedule. From 2015 to 2019, it carried Cubs and White Sox games broadcast by WGN Sports.

In early August 2008, Weigel Broadcasting agreed to sell all three of its South Bend stations, including WMYS, to Schurz Communications, the longtime owner of the local CBS affiliate WSBT-TV, for undisclosed terms. However, in the absence of action by the Federal Communications Commission (FCC), the deal was called off in August 2009.

== Technical information ==
=== Subchannels ===
The station's signal is multiplexed:

Subchannels of WMYS-LD
Channel	Res.	Short name	Programming
69.1	720p	MyMich	Heroes & Icons (primary); MyNetworkTV (secondary)
69.2	1080i	TLMNDO	Telemundo (WYTU-LD)
69.3	480i	CATCHY	Catchy Comedy
69.4	480i	DABL	Dabl

Simulcast of subchannels of another station

=== Analog-to-digital conversion ===
On September 14, 2007, WMYS and its sister stations began low-power digital broadcasts. On November 30, 2010, WMYS turned off its analog signal on channel 69 because of a power supply failure, although the station remained available on its digital companion channel and on digital cable. The station had a construction permit obtained by the FCC to move its analog signal to UHF channel 34, since channel 69 is an out-of-core allotment for post-digital transition television broadcasting and low-power television stations were at the time under no obligation to cease analog broadcasts. On April 16, 2012, the FCC granted a construction permit for WMYS-LD to move its digital frequency from channel 23 to channel 34 (its former proposed analog allotment and formerly occupied by the analog signal of WNIT). On August 19, WMYS-LD swapped digital frequencies with WBND-LD, with WMYS taking WBND's proposed channel 39 allotment and WBND taking the channel 34 allotment. On August 29, 2018, WMYS moved from channel 39 to channel 33. On October 18, 2019, WMYS moved from channel 33 to channel 28 (its former proposed analog allotment and formerly occupied by the analog signal of WSJV).
