= WEGP =

- Presque Isle, Maine; United States
- Broadcast area: Aroostook County, Maine
- Frequency: 1390 kHz
- Branding: Relevant Radio

Programming
- Format: Catholic radio
- Affiliations: Relevant Radio

Ownership
- Owner: Relevant Radio, Inc.

History
- First air date: June 24, 1960
- Former call signs: WTMS (1994)
- Call sign meaning: Edward G. Perrier (founder)

Technical information
- Licensing authority: FCC
- Facility ID: 9423
- Class: B
- Power: 5,000 watts
- Transmitter coordinates: 46°39′14.6″N 68°2′59.7″W

Links
- Public license information: Public file; LMS
- Webcast: Listen live
- Website: relevantradio.com

WEGP (1390 AM) is a radio station in Presque Isle, Maine. The station airs a Catholic talk format as an affiliate of Relevant Radio, and is owned by Relevant Radio, Inc. WEGP's transmitter is off Chapman Road in Presque Isle. It is the most powerful AM station in Northern Maine, broadcasting at 5,000 watts full-time, and using a non-directional antenna during the day. But at night, to protect other stations on 1390 AM, WEGP switches to a directional antenna.

== History ==
WEGP signed on the air on June 24, 1960. It was started by Edward G. Perrier. WEGP gets its name from its founder's initials. At the time, Perrier was the owner-publisher of the Presque Isle Star-Herald, mistakenly taken for the engineer for WAGM-TV (channel 8).

When Perrier decided to start WEGP, WAGM-TV was looking for a way to carry its signal into the Houlton area. In an effort to assist WAGM-TV in broadening its signal range, Perrier searched for a site and found an old horse pasture in Presque Isle. He performed the required testing and design and presented it to WAGM-TV. But the TV station changed hands and the new owners were not interested in using Perrier's ideas. Perrier decided to use the land for a transmitter site for his radio station.

WEGP was the second radio station to go on the air in Aroostook County, after WAGM radio (910 AM), the sister station to channel 8. That station, which later became WKZX, shut down in 1991. On March 18, 1994, WEGP changed its call sign to WTMS. After a single day, that change was reversed back and the station became WEGP again.

As music listening moved from AM to FM radio, WEGP went dark for a couple years during the mid-1990s. It was revived in 1997 by Paul Decelles, owner and president of Decelles Media, Inc. WEGP was simulcast from 1997 to April 2007 on another AM station in Aroostook County, WREM (710 AM) in Monticello. At that time, the local marketing agreement (LMA) with WREM was dropped.

Since its founding, WEGP had been powered at 5,000 watts. In August 2006, WEGP applied to the Federal Communications Commission (FCC) for an upgrade of its signal. In late 2007, the improvements were complete, boosting daytime power to 25,000 watts and nighttime power to 10,000 watts. In August 2010 the station was bought by Gregory McNeil, founder of Northern Maine Broadcasting, Inc. The simulcast with WREM, now known as WXME (780 AM), was brought back in February 2011.

Ownership of WEGP was taken back by Paul Decelles' Decelles-Smith Media on May 14, 2014. In March 2015, a "message to our listeners" on the station's web site said the station was off air pending a sale and the programming could be heard via each show's web sites. In April 2015, the station was sold to a Catholic radio organization, the Presence Radio Network. The sale was consummated on August 14, 2015, at a purchase price of $67,500. In 2018, The Presence Radio Network's stations were sold to Immaculate Heart Radio for $750,000, and on May 21, the stations became affiliates of Relevant Radio.
