= WNIT =

WNIT may refer to:

- WNIT (TV), a television station in South Bend, Indiana (channel 31, virtual 34)
- Women's National Invitation Tournament
