= Sumrall =

Sumrall can refer to:

- Sumrall, Mississippi
- Allison Sumrall, voice actress
- Lester Sumrall, television evangelist
