= Howard Carter (English preacher) =

- circa 1960-1970
- Born: January 3, 1891; Birmingham, England
- Died: January 22, 1971 (aged 80); Springfield, Missouri
- Spouse: Ruth Steelberg

Alfred Howard Carter (3 January 1891 – 22 January 1971), better known as Howard Carter, was a pioneer in the Pentecostal Christian faith.

== The Crown Mission ==
Carter was born in Birmingham. He took over England's first Pentecostal Bible School. In 1913 an organization called the Crown Mission began in the city, and shortly afterwards Carter became the leader of this group. By 1916 he became involved in a second Pentecostal work, and had to quit his regular work to maintain leadership of the two churches.

== In prison ==
In World War I, Carter was imprisoned in Wormwood Scrubs as a conscientious objector, and then spent time in Princetown Work Centre in the former Dartmoor Prison. While in prison he received the revelation of the nine gifts of the Holy Spirit. These teachings, based on the text of 1 Corinthians 12:8-10, are still used today as the primary teaching on the gifts of the Spirit within all major Pentecostal Christian belief systems.

From 4 September 1918 to 11 June 1919 he was a 'brother' on the staff of Wallingford Farm Training Colony, an institution run by the National Union for Christian Social Service for 'difficult' boys mainly referred by Boards of Guardians.

== Hampstead Bible School ==
In 1921, Carter was handed over leadership of Hampstead Bible School, originally to be on a temporary basis until a more suitable person was available to fill the opening. That never happened, as he held this position for some 27 years. Under Carter's leadership the school grew so much that they had to purchase a nearby house, and two more Bible schools were opened up.

He took his work so seriously at the school that he did not receive any of the money donated to the school for his own use unless it was marked specifically for him, and he paid his own room and board to the school out of his salary.

== Assemblies of God ==
Howard Carter later became a founding member of Assemblies of God in Great Britain and Ireland. He served on the General Council of these groups as vice-chairman 1929-1934, and as chairman 1934-1945.

== Later life ==
Howard Carter left the Hampstead Bible School in 1948 and moved to the United States where he eventually married Ruth (Fisher) Steelberg. She was the daughter of Elmer Kirk Fisher, who was the founder of the Upper Room Mission in Los Angeles, California. She had previously been married to Wesley Rowland Steelberg, who was general superintendent of the Assemblies of God U.S.A. Steelberg had died while on a trip to Wales in 1952. Carter spent the rest of his life in the U.S., and began to travel extensively as a preacher until his death in Springfield, Missouri, in 1971.

== Lester Sumrall ==
Howard Carter and Lester Sumrall first met in Eureka Springs, Arkansas when Carter was in his forties and Sumrall was in his early twenties. They formed an immediate relationship and traveled the world together as missionaries preaching the Gospel of Jesus Christ. Sumrall wrote about Carter in his books Adventuring with Christ and Pioneers of Faith. Sumrall also expounded on Carter's teachings of the nine gifts of the Spirit in his book The Gifts and Ministries of the Holy Spirit.

== Publications ==
- Questions and Answers on Spiritual Gifts

The Gifts of the Holy Spirit (possibly published by Springfield MO: Gospel Publishing House [AG USA], c1920s) New York Tokyo Moscow - c 1934 Spiritual gifts and their operation (Springfield, MO: Gospel Publishing House, 1968)
