= William Coperthwaite =

William S. Coperthwaite
- Born: September 19, 1930; Monticello, Maine
- Died: November 26, 2013 (aged 83); Washington, Maine
- Known for: A Handmade Life: In Search of Simplicity (2002); Yurt designs

William S. Coperthwaite (September 19, 1930 – November 26, 2013), a native of Maine, U.S., pioneered yurt building in the United States. For his book A Handmade Life: In Search of Simplicity, he received the Nautilus Book Award.

== Childhood and family ==
William Coperthwaite was born in Monticello, Maine, the son of William Sherman Coperthwaite Sr. and Lillian Coperthwaite. He had three sisters and was the youngest of the four children. Within a few years the family relocated to South Portland, where his father continued jobs as a carpenter, stableman, blacksmith and farmer. He graduated from South Portland High School in 1949, being active on the school paper, varsity track, and serving as representative to the Maine Student Legislature. He was awarded a State of Maine Competitive Scholarship.

== Education ==
William Coperthwaite attended Bowdoin College in Brunswick, Maine, where he majored in art history. His extra-curricular activities included track and pole vaulting, and he served as vice-president of the Outing Club. He later enrolled in the innovative Putney Graduate School of Teacher Education (Antioch University New England) Master's degree program and in 1972 was awarded a Ph.D. in education from Harvard University. Coperthwaite's Harvard research examined the process of instructing groups of students on yurt construction. His dissertation was on native Alaskan culture. One of the many yurts he built leading student groups (in 1976 on the new campus of World College West in Marin County, California) became the subject of a student-composed song; "Yurt Fever". Its final verse concluded with "...a person can stray all over the place, but a Yurt is always a round".

== Philosophy and lifestyle ==
"Those who guide us, who inspire us, having gone our way before, are now partners with us in building a better world. Any success we have is theirs as well as ours. To copy or imitate them should be only the beginning--the apprentice stage of life. It is fine to think, 'what will a Shaker do? What would Scott Nearing have said? What would Gandhi have thought?' These are good exercises for the mind, a way of weighing ideas and contemplated actions, valuable so long as we do not follow anyone blindly.

"Only by standing on their shoulders can we build a better world, but we should use the wise as advisers, not masters."

“Each of us tries to live in the best way we know how. I want to contribute to the problems of the world as little as possible. I really believe we must find simpler ways to live or society will collapse.”

William Coperthwaite is the subject of "Mr. Coperthwaite: A Life in the Maine Woods," a series of four observational films by the anthropologist and filmmaker Anna Grimshaw. "The four films chart Coperthwaite’s life as it unfolds over the course of a year. They explore the changing character of work through the seasons and the distinctive temporality of specific tasks."

== Death ==
William Coperthwaite died on November 26, 2013 in a single-car accident, when high winds and freezing rain created hazardous driving conditions, on his way to celebrate Thanksgiving with friends
