= World Harvest Radio International =

Religious shortwave radio station in South Carolina, United States

Coordinates: 32.6816°N 81.1299°W

World Harvest Radio International (WHRI) was a shortwave radio station in the United States, broadcasting conservative religious programming worldwide in the English language on a number of frequencies. Part of the Family Broadcasting Corporation Christian broadcasting group, WHRI was based in Cypress Creek, South Carolina, with programs for audiences in Asia broadcast from T8WH in Palau.

== History ==
Lester Sumrall founded the Lester Sumrall Evangelistic Association (LeSEA) and its humanitarian arm LeSEA Global Feed the Hungry, World Harvest Radio International.

WHRI signed on in 1985 with their first service, Angel 1, covering Central America, South America, and the Caribbean. Its 2nd service from WHRI, Angel 2 went on the air in 1987, covering Europe, Central and South America.

In 1993, WHRI opened a second station, KWHR (transmitted from Ka Lae, the southernmost point in Hawaii), which provided Angel 3 covering China and Eastern Asia, expanding in 1997 with Angel 4, covering the South Pacific. The license for KWHR expired in 2009.

Angel 3 and Angel 4 used to transmit from T8WH in Palau, a station which had originally been built by High Adventure Ministries in the mid-1980s, and operated for some 15 years under the call sign KHBN. The Palau site is no longer in operation, having closed October 27, 2019.

Along with the sale of WHRI, this concludes all of World Harvest Radio's shortwave broadcasting.

In 1998, its third station, WHRA in Greenbush, Maine, signed on with Angel 5, a signal for Africa and the Middle East. As of November 17, 2009, World Harvest ceased operations of WHRA and dismantled its facilities, with its frequencies reassigned for WHRI.

WHRI also operates Angel 6 with a signal primarily for Mexico.

In August 2020, it was announced that WHRI was selling its facilities to Allen Weiner, owner of Monticello, Maine-based shortwave station WBCQ, pending FCC approval.

== Frequencies (in MHz) ==
- Angel-1: 6.175, 7.315, 9.605, 9.895, 11.565, 11.775, 17.51, 21.63
- Angel-2: 5.92, 6.195, 7.315, 9.825, 9.84, 9.895, 11.635, 17.51
- Angel-3: 9.93, 9.965
- Angel-4: 9.625, 9.96, 11.705, 15.4, 15.5, 17.8
- Angel-5: 9.93, 9.96, 9.965, 9.975
- Angel-6: 6.175, 7.385, 9.795, 9.86, 15.16
