= FETV =

American cable and satellite network

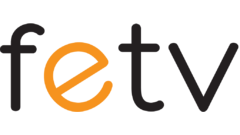
- Country: United States
- Headquarters: South Bend, Indiana

Programming
- Language: English
- Picture format: 480i (SDTV); 1080i (HDTV)

Ownership
- Owner: Family Broadcasting Corporation
- Sister channels: Family Movie Classics

History
- Launched: 2013

Links
- Website: https://www.fetv.tv

Availability

Streaming media
- Service(s): DirecTV Stream, Frndly TV, FuboTV, Philo, Sling TV

FETV (initialism for Family Entertainment Television and stylized as fetv) is an American cable and satellite television network owned by the Family Broadcasting Corporation. Marketed as "satellite and cable network featuring classic and inspirational programming the whole family can enjoy", the network airs a variety of classic television programs from the 1950s through the 1980s and classic movies, along with religious and televangelism programming. The service is available to over 50 million subscribers via cable, satellite and streaming platforms.

== Programming ==
FETV consists of classic TV programs with a wide variety of genres, including sitcoms, westerns, mystery and action series. FETV has officially launched a new logo and wording to the capital letters fetv (using the ? writing style) Marathons are periodically shown at various times of the year. FETV also airs classic movies throughout the weekend on Sundays. During the early morning hours each day, FETV airs paid programming including four hours of religious programming on Sundays.

On February 1, 2025, FETV began airing most of their classic TV programs in their original, unaltered format, rather than syndicated versions edited down to fit a 30- or 60-minute timeslot due to the increasing length of commercial breaks over time. This resulted in the network carrying an "off-the-clock" schedule, with most programming no longer starting at the top or bottom of the hour.

=== Current programs ===
- Adam-12 (April 3, 2023–present)
- Barney Miller (January 1, 2018–present)
- The Beverly Hillbillies (August 30, 2021–2023; August 30, 2025–January 2, 2026; August 3, 2026–present)
- Bewitched (2017–present)
- The Bionic Woman (November 2, 2026–present)
- Car 54, Where Are You? (May 5, 2026–present)
- The Carol Burnett Show (January 3, 2026–present)
- Emergency! (April 4, 2022–present)
- Hazel (2015–January 25, 2025; March 3, 2025–present)
- Highway Patrol (April 1, 2024–present)
- I Dream of Jeannie (January 8, 2018–2021; November 2, 2026–present)
- The Jeffersons (August 25, 2025–present)
- Leave It to Beaver (August 30, 2021–present)
- The Munsters (September 29, 2025–present)
- My Three Sons (February 3, 2025–present) (seasons 1–5 only)
- Perry Mason (2014–present)
- Rawhide (November 1, 2021–October 28, 2024; July 4, 2026–present)
- The Rebel (December 7, 2026–present)
- The Rookies (July 7, 2025–present)
- S.W.A.T. (February 1, 2026–present)
- Wanted Dead or Alive (September 6, 2026–present)

=== Former programs ===
- The A-Team
- The Addams Family (October 5, 2020–October 29, 2021)
- Bat Masterson (November 4, 2019–October 29, 2021)
- The Bob Newhart Show (August 27, 2018–2020)
- Bonanza
- Charlie's Angels
- Daniel Boone (October 30, 2023–October 26, 2025)
- Designing Women (September 30, 2020–August 30, 2021)
- The Dick Van Dyke Show
- Dragnet (August 19, 2024–August 2, 2026)
- Dr. Quinn, Medicine Woman (September 22, 2022–December 31, 2024)
- Father Knows Best (October 2018–2021)
- The Flying Nun (2018–2021)
- Green Acres (November 4, 2019–2022)
- Hart to Hart (January 21, 2018–2021)
- Here Come the Brides (November 1, 2025–September 25, 2026)
- Here's Lucy
- Highway to Heaven
- Knight Rider
- Laramie (October 28, 2024–September 5, 2026)
- Lassie
- The Life and Legend of Wyatt Earp (April 29, 2024–May 9, 2025)
- The Lone Ranger (2015–September 28, 2025)
- Magnum, P.I.
- Mannix (August 30, 2021–2023)
- Marcus Welby, M.D.
- The Mary Tyler Moore Show (August 27, 2018–2020)
- Matlock (September 2017–2021)
- Maude
- The Monkees (December 9, 2017–August 28, 2021)
- Murder, She Wrote
- One Day at a Time (2019–2021)
- The Partridge Family (December 9, 2017–August 28, 2021)
- The Patty Duke Show
- Peter Gunn (December 10, 2017–2020)
- Petticoat Junction
- Quincy, M.E. (August 28, 2023–August 24, 2025)
- The Real McCoys (November 1, 2021–2022)
- Route 66 (June 1, 2019–October 2024)
- The Roy Rogers Show (September 17, 2017–2020)
- The Saint (August 31, 2019–2021)
- Sergeant Preston of the Yukon
- The Six Million Dollar Man
- T. J. Hooker (June 26, 2017–August 30, 2021)
- The Texan (July 1, 2023–October 28, 2024)
- Tombstone Territory (November 4, 2019–October 29, 2021; October 30, 2023–October 28, 2024)
- Wagon Train (November 1, 2021–April 26, 2024)
- The Wild Wild West (August 26, 2019–June 27, 2021)
