= WBCQ-FM =

Coordinates: 46.342°N 67.817°W

- Monticello, Maine; United States
- Broadcast area: Aroostook County, Maine
- Frequency: 94.7 MHz
- Branding: "Classic Country 94.7 Kixx FM"

Programming
- Format: Classic country
- Affiliations: Salem Radio Network

Ownership
- Owner: Allan Weiner; (Allan H. Weiner)
- Sister stations: WBCQ, WXME

History
- First air date: September 2008
- Call sign meaning: Weiner Broadcasting Company

Technical information
- Licensing authority: FCC
- Facility ID: 170487
- Class: A
- ERP: 6,000 watts
- HAAT: 95 meters

Links
- Public license information: Public file; LMS
- Webcast: Listen Live (TuneIn); Listen Live (MP3)
- Website: kixxfm.com

WBCQ-FM (94.7 FM) is a radio station licensed to Monticello, Maine, United States. The station currently broadcasts a locally originated classic country format with news and weather at the top of the hour. WBCQ-FM resumed full-time as of October 7, 2013.

WBCQ-FM is owned by Barbara Weiner and Allan Weiner, who also owns the shortwave station WBCQ and AM station WXME. For 5 years, County Communications, Inc. (and later Northern Maine Media) the owner of radio station WHOU-FM, operated WBCQ-FM under a local marketing agreement. That relationship ended April 2, 2013.
