= Hal Turner =

American Holocaust denier and radio host

- Born: Harold Charles Turner; March 15, 1962 (age 64); Jersey City, New Jersey, U.S.
- Occupation: Radio host

Harold Charles "Hal" Turner (born March 15, 1962) is an American political commentator and convicted felon from North Bergen, New Jersey.

Turner's viewpoints typically encompass Holocaust denial and white supremacy, and have included calls for assassination of government officials. In August 2010, he was convicted for making threats against three federal judges with the 7th U.S. Circuit Court of Appeals, for which he spent two years in prison.

Turner has sporadically hosted The Hal Turner Show, usually on shortwave radio station WBCQ, since 2002, as well as a corresponding blog, which has changed URLs frequently and has spread hoaxes and fake news.

== Early life ==
Turner was born in Jersey City and raised in Union City and from age five in Ridgefield Park, where he attended Ridgefield Park High School. Prior to working on radio, Turner worked as a driver and a salesman.

== Early career ==
Identifying himself as "Hal from North Bergen", Turner became notable in American conservative circles as a frequent caller to and supporter of WABC radio talk show hosts Bob Grant and Sean Hannity. Turner parlayed this fame into a role as the northern New Jersey coordinator for Patrick J. Buchanan's 1992 presidential campaign.

Turner claims he established a friendship with Sean Hannity, on whose radio program he had once been a frequent presence. In 2008, while Hannity and Malik Zulu Shabazz of the New Black Panther Party were debating Barack Obama's association with Jeremiah Wright, Shabazz asked Hannity if he should "be judged by (his) promotion and association with Hal Turner". Hannity began to say that he didn't know Turner, but then said he was someone he had banned from his radio program ten years before. Turner subsequently gave an account of their association on his website, in which he said of Hannity's response: "I was quite disappointed when Sean Hannity at first tried to say he didn't know me. In fact, Sean does know me and we were quite friendly a few years ago." Phil Boyce, Program Director of WABC, disputed the account, which described a friendship developing between Turner and Hannity in 1993, three years before Hannity was actually hired at WABC.

Turner became a talk radio host, joining fellow regular callers Frank from Queens and John from Staten Island to start the program The Right Perspective. Turner left the program in 2002, citing artistic differences. In 2002, Turner became a solo host, purchasing a time slot on shortwave radio station WBCQ, over which he broadcast for approximately four years. On WBCQ on March 22, 2004, he left the show "after harshly criticizing his supporters, listeners, and WBCQ." The show lacked financial support and Turner had health problems, leading to the temporary closure of his website and show.

== Activism and assault claims ==
In the 2000 US congress election, Turner sought the Republican Party nomination for election to the United States Congress from New Jersey's 13th congressional district. He received 18.6% of the vote, losing to Theresa de Leon. Turner has identified himself as the "Chairman of the Republican Party of Hudson County, NJ Corp," a group which has no connection to the official Hudson County Republican Party recognized by the state and national party. According to news reports, Hudson County Republican officials have stated that Turner's party is a "paper corporation with little or no membership".

In response to an October 7, 2005, assault against a white student by a Black student at Kingston High School, Turner, working with the white nationalist group National Vanguard, organized a rally which he called a "rally against violence". He characterized the rally as both "pro-white" and "against violence". The victim's mother chose not to attend the rally. In response, local residents, including political and religious leaders, organized a number of "Unity Rallies" with a tolerance theme. When the rally occurred on November 19, 2005, Turner and the National Vanguard attracted approximately 50 demonstrators, compared to the 100 counter-demonstrators. Turner called for the attacker to be charged with a hate crime, but the case resulted in the perpetrator being indicted as an adult with two felony counts: assault and attempted assault instead.

On April 12, 2006, Turner had a physical altercation with Jaime Vazquez, a former Jersey City deputy mayor and a member of the Jersey City Council, who was the Jersey City Commissioner of Veterans Affairs at the time. The North Bergen Reporter quoted Turner as saying "(t)he illegal immigrants are breaking the law, and people like me should break the law as well by shooting them down." In response, Vazquez picketed with a sign reading "Hal Turner — shoot me! Racists and bigots like you are cowards." This was followed by a physical confrontation, during which Vazquez suffered a back injury and a fractured wrist. Turner and Vazquez later filed criminal charges against each other. On July 16, 2006 North Bergen Municipal Court Judge Joseph Romano found both men to be equally credible and thus neither criminally liable.

== Broadcasting and website issues ==
In 2002, Turner started broadcasting, but quit the show in July 2008 and resumed broadcasting it in April 2009 as the Turner Radio Network. In August 2008 his website also closed. Although he retained a blog, it was shut down by his host, Google's Blogger, for violations of terms of service.

=== Origin of China eminent domain hoax ===
In February 2009, Turner posted an article on his blog entitled: "FEDS GRANT EMINENT DOMAIN AS COLLATERAL TO CHINA FOR U.S. DEBTS!" claiming that a secret agreement had been made to allow China to physically take U.S. land, in the event of a U.S. default. The story created "hundreds of identical Internet replications" according to Snopes.

=== Anonymous website raid ===
Turner stated that in December 2006 and January 2007 individuals who identified themselves as members of the group Anonymous took Turner's website offline, costing him thousands of dollars in bandwidth bills. On January 19, 2007, Turner sued 4chan, eBaum's World, 7chan, Abjects IRC network, and other websites for copyright infringement. On January 22, 2007, he lost his plea for an injunction. In February 2007 4chan responded to the lawsuit. In April 2007, the judge asked the parties to submit information to schedule proceedings. However, Turner failed to respond. Mail from the court to Turner was returned as "Undeliverable". The judge dismissed the case in December 2007.

=== FBI informant ===
Turner was a paid informant for the Federal Bureau of Investigation (FBI) for several years, supplying information about right-wing groups to federal agents. The original allegations that Turner acted as an informant for the FBI surfaced in 2008 after unidentified hackers claimed on Turner's website's forums that they had read email correspondences between him and an FBI agent, apparently his handler. This led to a discussion on a neo-Nazi website on January 10, 2008, in which Turner revealed that he was quitting political work, ending his radio show and separating "from the 'pro-White' movement". The FBI has declined to comment on the matter. The Southern Poverty Law Center and the Anti-Defamation League reported on the emails that "a neo-Nazi Website had posted material reportedly found by the hackers, including alleged exchanges between himself and law enforcement agents which indicated that Turner had been providing information to them."

On July 28, 2009, in a Chicago courtroom, Turner's defense lawyer said that Turner worked as a paid informant for the FBI. In December 2009, The Record published an investigative report on Turner's "complex" relationship with the FBI and Federal U.S. Marshal Service, noting that all parties broke off contact at several points.

Turner's information led to the arrests of the Hutaree militia, with Turner's FBI handler serving as the prosecution's witness.

Michael A. Orozco, Turner's lawyer said, "I don't think he was a racist. He was doing a lot of those things at the behest of the FBI."

=== Return to radio ===
On October 7, 2015, Turner returned to radio for the weekly, two hour Hal Turner Show, broadcast on shortwave radio station WBCQ and over the internet. For a time in 2015, Turner promoted another broadcast over "Superstation 95," a pirate radio station in the New York City area. The show aired until February 1, 2017, and then resumed on July 5, 2017, eventually adding two more shortwave affiliates, WRMI and WWCR. Turner stated at the end of March 2019 that he had run out of funds to keep the show on WBCQ and WRMI. An associated fundraising appeal was a success, and Turner expanded his broadcast to a daily show. Turner ended his run on WBCQ in September 2025, while continuing the show on its other affiliates.

== Threats against judges and political figures ==
Turner has a history of making threats against various public figures. In 2005, Turner publicized the names of three federal court judges who handled lawsuits involving Matt Hale, a white supremacist convicted of soliciting the murder of a federal judge. Turner posted the judges' names and addresses on his Web site.

On December 6, 2006, Turner announced on his website:

We may have to ASSASSINATE some of the people you elect on Nov. 7! This could be your LAST ELECTION CHANCE, to save this Republic ... Sorry to have to be so blunt, but the country is in mortal danger from our present government and our liberty is already near dead because of this government. If you are too stupid to turn things around with your vote, there are people out here like me who are willing to turn things around with guns, force and violence. We hope our method does not become necessary

Since the announcement was made, Turner has had difficulties finding a host for his website. He alleged that his website has been the target of denial of service attacks, and subsequently filed a pro se lawsuit.

On April 4, 2008, Turner encouraged violence against Lexington, Massachusetts, school superintendent Paul Ash for establishing a new curriculum supporting homosexuals. On his website, he stated:

I advocate parents using FORCE AND VIOLENCE against Superintendent Paul B. Ash as a method of defending the health and safety of school children presently being endangered through his politically-correct indoctrination into deadly, disease-ridden sodomite lifestyles.

He went on to provide Ash's personal information, including his address. Fourteen months later, on June 2, 2009, Turner posted on his blog

Let me be the first to say this plainly: These judges deserve to be killed. Their blood will replenish the tree of liberty. A small price to pay to assure freedom for millions.

The next day Turner posted information on how to find Chief Judge Frank Easterbrook and Judges Richard Posner and William J. Bauer.

=== Arrests, trials, and conviction ===
On June 3, 2009, Turner was arrested in New Jersey and charged with inciting injury to two politicians in Connecticut and a state ethics official. The warrant issued was for inciting his website's readers to "take up arms" against the officials. Two weeks later, Turner was re-arrested on June 24, 2009, at his New Jersey home for making threats against the judges of the United States Court of Appeals in Chicago. When he was arrested, FBI officials seized 200 rounds of ammunition as well as three handguns and one shotgun. In the federal case, Turner was denied bail.

On June 30, 2009, the website for Turner's blog was shut down and replaced with a notice stating that the site had been taken down by Turner's family, directing interested parties to a blog for the Family of Hal Turner, with entries by his mother.

==== United States v. Turner ====
On July 28, 2009, in the case of United States v. Turner in Chicago, Turner pleaded not guilty to threatening to kill three federal appellate judges there and then sought his release from custody, saying he had been an informant for the FBI. The judge gave Turner ten days "to produce concrete evidence of Turner's help to the FBI or federal marshals." On August 11, Turner was denied bail again. The judge cited the fact that Turner, from his prison cell, recorded and posted on the internet a telephone conversation that included the names of his arresting FBI agents. The judge said that Turner's act "tells me something about the disposition of Mr. Turner."

His lawyer said the defense would use "Turner's background as an FBI informant" and argue that he was "trained by the FBI" as "an agent provocateur" to incite people. In late October 2009 Turner was freed on $500,000 bond, and was ordered not to use a computer or any device that can access the Internet. His trial started on November 30, 2009, and ended on December 4, 2009, with the defense opting not to call any witnesses. After two hours of deliberation, the jury announced it was deadlocked. Three days later the judge declared a mistrial, and a retrial was set for March 1, 2010. This second trial, overseen by Western District of Louisiana judge Donald Walter, was moved from the Northern District of Illinois to the Eastern District of New York: since the prosecution was to call the three judges to the stand, the defense felt that Turner would not get a fair hearing if the trial was conducted in the same city where the judges worked. A mistrial was declared on March 10.

In August 2010, his third trial began and on August 31, after three days of testimony, the jury found Turner guilty. On 21 December 2010, he was sentenced to 33 months in prison. Upon completion of his sentence, he was barred from participating in Internet or satellite radio programming for three years. In his sentencing memorandum, U.S. Attorney Patrick J. Fitzgerald made the following comment:

For years, Turner has engaged in a campaign of intimidation against public officials and private citizens alike. Even Turner's arrest in this case failed to deter him. Turner continued his tactics by using intimidation against a key witness in the government's case against him. All the while, Turner has displayed defiance and no regret for his actions. Turner remains utterly incapable of acknowledging the genuine fear experienced by his innumerable victims – that is, except when he is the victim of a perceived threat. Turner has committed a serious crime, engaged in witness intimidation, lied repeatedly under oath, and has shown no regret whatsoever.

After his conviction, Turner was incarcerated in the Metropolitan Detention Center, Brooklyn, and was later moved to the Federal Correctional Complex, Terre Haute. In May, he sent letters to The Jersey Journal saying he is one of 38 people housed in Communication Management Unit in the prison Terre Haute with terrorists, like John Walker Lindh, and fears for his life once fellow prisoners find out he was a government informant.

During his incarceration, Turner declared bankruptcy, and his wife filed for divorce.

In August 2011, Turner filed an appeal for his conviction. He claimed that the government "failed to substantiate the charge" and asked to be released pending the appeal.

==== Connecticut v. Turner ====
In July 2009 the Connecticut case was handed to a division of the state court that handles more serious matters. In early February 2011, Turner appeared in a Hartford court for the Connecticut v. Turner pre-trial hearing on three counts of inciting injuries to persons. The three felony counts Turner faced each carried one to 10 years in prison.

In late February 2011, the federal government reported that e-mails "show it appears Turner plans to pursue judicial and law-enforcement officials after he's released from prison." On February 2, Turner wrote "when I get out, I'm gonna go after some 'problems' and take care of them in a manner that will be horrific."

On March 25, 2011, Turner appeared in Hartford asking the court to be allowed to change his attorney, telling the judge, "I have no confidence in his ability to defend me." The judge reluctantly allowed him to change his private attorney for a public defender citing Turner's unusually bad year. On April 7, with a public defender at his side, Turner pleaded not guilty and the case went to trial.

In July 2011, Turner's public defender asked for the case to be dismissed, saying Turner's statements were free speech and that Connecticut courts did not have jurisdiction because his threats were made in New Jersey. Prosecutor Thomas Garcia responded that Turner himself wrote that his intent behind the writing was to "foment direct action" against the lawmakers "personally."

In September 2011, Turner asked Judge Carl J. Schuman for permission to represent himself after disagreeing with his public defender, John Stawicki, about defense strategy. Judge Schuman agreed, but Stawicki remained as stand-by counsel. That same week jury selection began.

On September 16, 2011, after three hours of deliberation, Turner was found not guilty of "felony inciting injury to people and misdemeanor threatening." After hugging his family, Turner was "escorted back into custody" to continue serving his sentence in the federal case.

Turner was released from prison on October 5, 2012.
