= WHME (FM) =

South Bend, Indiana; United States
- Broadcast area: Michiana
- Frequency: 103.1 MHz (HD Radio)
- Branding: PulseFM

Programming
- Format: Christian contemporary
- Subchannels: HD2: Christian talk "Harvest FM"

Ownership
- Owner: Family Broadcasting Corporation
- Sister stations: WHPZ; WHPD; WHME-TV; WHRI

History
- First air date: 1968
- Call sign meaning: "World Harvest Michiana Entertainment"

Technical information
- Licensing authority: FCC
- Facility ID: 37149
- Class: A
- ERP: 3,000 watts
- HAAT: 91 meters (299 ft)
- Transmitter coordinates: 41°36′11.1″N 86°12′51″W

Links
- Public license information: Public file; LMS
- Webcast: Listen live; HD2: Listen live
- Website: www.pulsefm.com; www.whmefm.com

WHME (103.1 FM, "PulseFM") is a Christian radio station in South Bend, Indiana. The flagship radio station of Family Broadcasting Corporation, it broadcasts a contemporary Christian music format as part of a trimulcast with 96.9 WHPZ and 92.1 WHPD.

The station carries a Christian talk and teaching format, Harvest FM, on its HD Radio subchannel.

== History ==
WHME has a long history of airing Christian contemporary music, and was the original host of the Christian contemporary music festival that is now known as the World Pulse Festival, which began as a free concert to celebrate WHME's 19th anniversary in 1987.

On December 9, 1996, WHME's Christian contemporary music format moved to WHPZ, and the station switched to a Christian talk format, branded as Harvest FM.

In March 2018, it was announced that WHME would return to the PulseFM format (forming a trimulcast with it and WHPD), and that all three stations would upgrade their signals to deploy HD Radio service (with the Harvest FM programming moving to the HD2 subchannels of all three stations).
