= World Pulse Festival =

The World Pulse Festival is a Christian contemporary music festival in South Bend, Indiana. It was started in 1986 by LeSEA Broadcasting Corporation as a birthday celebration for radio station WHME. It is held on WHME grounds in South Bend, Indiana, except in 2014, when it was moved to the Compton Family Ice Arena at Notre Dame. In 2017, the Pulse Festival started the "Pulse Summer Series" that spread out a concert each month during the season. Its attendance numbers have ranged between 40,000 and 60,000 attendees, making it one of the largest Christian music festivals in the Midwest.

== History ==
- 2002-Newsboys, ZOEgirl, Michael W. Smith, Mark Schultz, By The Tree, Andy, & Everyday Sunday.
- 2003-Newsboys, Sixpence None The Richer, Jars of Clay, Paul Colman Trio, Out of Eden, Denver, The Mile High Orchestra.
- 2004-Third Day, Audio Adrenaline, Rebecca St. James, Tait, and Petra.
- 2005-Phil Keaggy, MercyMe, Jars of Clay, Nicole C. Mullen.
- 2006-Barlow Girl, Jeremy Camp, TobyMac, Newsboys, Salvador.
- 2007-Superchick, Sanctus Real, Krystal Myers Kutless, Michael W. Smith.
- 2008-C3, Mandisa, Skillet, TobyMac, Casting Crowns.
- 2009-Robbie Seay Band, Ayiesha Woods, Hawk Nelson, David Crowder Band, Jeremy Camp.
- 2010-Josh Wilson, Sidewalk Prophets, Fireflight, Kutless, Amy Grant, TobyMac.
- 2011-Newsboys, Third Day, Jars of Clay, Group 1 Crew, Dara Maclean, Hyland.
- 2012-MercyMe, Needtobreathe, Peter Furler, Britt Nicole, Rhett Walker Band, Dara Maclean, Manic Drive.
- 2013-Switchfoot, Audio Adrenaline, Natalie Grant, The City Harmonic, Jason Castro.
- 2014-Chris Tomlin, Sanctus Real, Mandisa, Skillet, Building 429, Colton Dixon, Ellie Holcomb and 1 Girl Nation.
- 2015-Amy Grant, Tenth Avenue North, Michael W. Smith, Building 429, Sidewalk Prophets, Vertical Church Band, Blanca.
- 2016-For King & Country, Switchfoot, Phillips, Craig and Dean, Lincoln Brewster, Plumb, Union of Sinners and Saints, 7eventh Time Down, The Imperials
- 2017-Matthew West, Mandisa, Crowder, Skillet, Colton Dixon
- 2018-For King & Country, Blanca, TobyMac, Stars Go Dim, Mercy Me, We Are Messengers
