= WCWW-LD =

Television station in South Bend, Indiana

- South Bend, Indiana; United States
- Channels: Digital: 25 (UHF); Virtual: 25
- Branding: CW 25 (general); ABC 57 News on CW 25 (newscasts)

Programming
- Affiliations: 25.1: The CW; for others, see § Subchannels

Ownership
- Owner: Weigel Broadcasting; (WCWW-TV Limited Partnership)
- Sister stations: WBND-LD, WMYS-LD

History
- First air date: August 31, 1990
- Former call signs: W25BM (1990–1995); WYGN-LP (1995–2002); WRDY-LP (2002); WMWB-LP (2002–2006); WCWW-LP (2006–2012)
- Former channel numbers: Analog: 25 (UHF, 1990–2012); Digital: 27 (UHF, 2007–2012)
- Former affiliations: 3ABN (1990–March 2002); ABC (via WBND-LP, March–October 2002); The WB (October 2002–2006); ABC (LD4, via WBND-LD, 2019–2021)
- Call sign meaning: CW Network Weigel

Technical information
- Licensing authority: FCC
- Facility ID: 24617
- Class: LD
- ERP: 14.9 kW; 15 kW (CP)
- HAAT: 344.2 m (1,129 ft)
- Transmitter coordinates: 41°36′55″N 86°11′7″W

Links
- Public license information: LMS
- Website: www.thecw25.com

WCWW-LD (channel 25) is a low-power television station in South Bend, Indiana, United States, affiliated with The CW. It is owned by Weigel Broadcasting alongside WBND-LD (channel 57), an ABC affiliate, and WMYS-LD (channel 69). The three stations share studios on Generations Drive (near the Indiana Toll Road) in northeastern South Bend; WCWW-LD's transmitter is located just off the St. Joseph Valley Parkway on the city's south side.

Due to its low-power status, its broadcasting radius only covers the immediate South Bend area. Therefore, Weigel relies on paid television subscription carriage for all three of its South Bend television stations to reach the entire market.

WCWW-LD is the only CW affiliate owned by Weigel, after flagship WCIU-TV in Chicago reverted to being an independent station on September 1, 2024.

== History ==
The station was founded on August 31, 1990, as W25BM, operating as an affiliate of the Three Angels Broadcasting Network; it later changed its callsign to WYGN-LP in October 1995. On March 14, 2002, the station was transferred to its current owner, Weigel Broadcasting, who had been previously broadcasting general entertainment programming on what is now WYGN-LD; it also dropped 3ABN which went to WYGN-LD, changed its callsign to WRDY-LP, and began simulcasting ABC programming from sister station WBND-LP; that fall, the station dropped the WBND-LP simulcast and affiliated with The WB, which moved to WRDY-LP from the original WMWB-LP (now WMYS-LD), and it adopted the WMWB-LP callsign previously held by channel 69 to reflect its new affiliation with the network.

On March 1, 2006, Weigel officials announced that WMWB would affiliate with The CW, a network formed out of the struggling WB and UPN networks in partnership with the two networks' owners Time Warner and CBS Corporation, when it premiered in September; channel 25 changed its call letters to WCWW-LP upon the network's launch on September 18, 2006. The WCWW calls had belonged to sister station WMYS, which took an affiliation with CW competitor MyNetworkTV (which launched two weeks earlier); the two stations both have borne the WRDY and WYGN calls.

In early August 2008, Weigel Broadcasting agreed to sell all three of its South Bend stations, including WCWW, to Schurz Communications, the longtime owner of the local CBS affiliate WSBT-TV (channel 22), for undisclosed terms. However, in the absence of action by the Federal Communications Commission, the deal was called off in August 2009.

With Weigel flagship WCIU-TV's assumption of the CW affiliation in Chicago on September 1, 2019, Until 2024, Weigel owned both of the network's affiliates on the southern shore of Lake Michigan.

== Newscasts ==
On March 19, 2012, WCWW-LD debuted a nightly half-hour prime time newscast at 10 p.m. that is produced by WBND-LD (entitled ABC 57 News at 10 on CW 25). WBND also produces two hours of morning news on WCWW from 7 to 9 a.m. weekdays.

== Technical information ==
=== Subchannels ===
The station's signal is multiplexed:

Subchannels of WCWW-LD
Channel	Res.	Short name	Programming
25.1	1080i	CW25	The CW
25.2	480i	START	Start TV
25.3	480i	TOONS	MeTV Toons
25.4	480i	MeTV+	MeTV+
25.5	480i	STORY	Story Television
25.6	480i	WEST	WEST
25.12	480i	EMLW	OnTV4U

In July 2010, WCWW-LD launched a second digital subchannel on 25.2 as an affiliate of This TV.

In September 2018, WCWW-LD's digital subchannel 25.2 replaced This TV with Start TV. This TV moved to a newly launched third subchannel.

In February 2019, WCWW-LD added a high-definition simulcast of sister station WBND-LD on digital subchannel 25.4.

In September 2021, WCWW-LD replaced a simulcast of WBND-LD on digital subchannel 25.4 with MeTV's expansion network, MeTV+.

In March 2022, WCWW-LD launched a fifth digital subchannel on 25.5 as an affiliate of Story Television.

In September 2025, WCWW-LD launched a sixth digital subchannel 25.6 as an affiliate of WEST.

=== Analog-to-digital conversion ===
On September 14, 2007, WCWW and its sister stations began broadcasting low-power digital signals. WCWW-LD broadcasts with an effective radiated power of 25 kW on channel 25. On December 28, 2010, WCWW-LP turned off its analog signal on channel 25 because of equipment failure. On April 16, 2012, the FCC granted WCWW-LP a construction permit to move its digital frequency from channel 27 to its former analog allotment, UHF channel 25.
