= WBCQ (SW) =

- Monticello, Maine; United States
- Broadcast area: North America; South America; Europe; Asia
- Frequencies: 3.265 MHz; 5.130 MHz; 6.160 MHz; 7.490 MHz; 9.330 MHz
- Branding: WBCQ, The Planet

Programming
- Format: Variety

Ownership
- Owner: Allan Weiner; (Allan H. Weiner)
- Sister stations: WBCQ-FM; WXME-AM

History
- First air date: September 8, 1998
- Call sign meaning: Weiner Broadcasting Company Q

Technical information
- Licensing authority: FCC
- Facility ID: 77261
- Power: 500,000 watts
- Transmitter coordinates: 46°20′28″N 67°48′53″W

Links
- Public license information: Public file; LMS
- Webcast: Listen Live (TuneIn); Listen Live (MP3)
- Website: www.wbcq.com

WBCQ is a shortwave radio station operating at Monticello, Maine, United States. The station is owned and operated by Allan Weiner, who also owns and operates WXME AM 780 kHz and WBCQ-FM 94.7 MHz at the shortwave site. The station transmits talk shows and other programs produced by commercial networks as well as former pirate radio broadcasters, including Weiner himself.

== History ==
WBCQ began operation on September 8, 1998, on 7,415 kHz.

WBCQ, Monticello, Maine, began testing August 20 and began programming September 8, only on 7415, on a 245° beam, which roughly crosses Buffalo, Columbus, Evansville, Little Rock, San Antonio, Laredo, Durango, Tuxpan, across the Pacific to south of New Zealand.

== Rotatable antenna and 500 kW transmitter ==
In 2018, WBCQ applied for a transmitter license associated with a rotatable antenna, later revealed to be a 500 kW transmitter for an Ampegon rotatable curtain antenna on a single mast. This transmitter was originally funded by and leased out to World's Last Chance, a flat-Earth nontrinitarian Christian cult. In 2026, WLC's assets were lost due to the theft of their cryptocurrency wallet, and Weiner turned off the transmitter and placed it back up for lease.

== Acquisition of World Harvest Radio International ==
In August 2020, it was reported that pending FCC approval, Weiner planned to purchase World Harvest Radio International, the shortwave arm of the Family Broadcasting Corporation.

== Frequencies ==
As of 2023, WBCQ broadcasts on 7.49 MHz (41m band) from noon until midnight (as WWCR is licensed to use the frequency during morning hours), including original programming in the late-afternoon and evening hours (Eastern Time Zone). WBCQ also broadcasts on 6.16 MHz (a secondary frequency that operates evenings) and 5.13 MHz ("Radio Angela," an evening service with eclectic music and spoken word entertainment); the currently off-air 500 kW rotating transmitter is licensed at 9.33 MHz.

== Notable shows ==
- Radio Newyork International
- The Hal Turner Show
- Marion's Attic with Marion Webster and Kristina
