= WNDU-TV =

Television station in South Bend, Indiana

- South Bend–Elkhart, Indiana; United States
- City: South Bend, Indiana
- Channels: Digital: 27 (UHF); Virtual: 16
- Branding: WNDU 16; 16 News Now

Programming
- Affiliations: 16.1: NBC; for others, see § Subchannels

Ownership
- Owner: Gray Media; (Gray Television Licensee, LLC)

History
- First air date: July 15, 1955
- Former channel numbers: Analog: 46 (UHF, 1955–1957), 16 (UHF, 1957–2009); Digital: 42 (UHF, 1998–2019)
- Former affiliations: United (secondary, 1967); PBS (per program, 1970–1974)
- Call sign meaning: Notre Dame University (former owner)

Technical information
- Licensing authority: FCC
- Facility ID: 41674
- ERP: 650 kW
- HAAT: 310.4 m (1,018 ft)
- Transmitter coordinates: 41°36′20″N 86°12′46″W

Links
- Public license information: Public file; LMS
- Website: www.wndu.com

WNDU-TV (channel 16) is a television station in South Bend, Indiana, United States, affiliated with NBC. Owned by Gray Media, it maintains studios on the campus of the University of Notre Dame, the station's founding owner, along State Road 933 on South Bend's north side; its transmitter is located southeast of the St. Joseph County Fairgrounds on the city's south side.

The station's studios also house production facilities for the syndicated agricultural news programs AgDay and U.S. Farm Report, the former of which is broadcast locally by WNDU-TV; WNDU-TV's weather department provides the forecasts seen on those shows.

== History ==
The station first signed on the air on July 15, 1955, as a project of Notre Dame president Theodore Hesburgh, originally broadcasting on UHF channel 46. WNDU-TV was owned by the Michiana Telecasting Corporation, a subsidiary of the University of Notre Dame. The station took its call letters from WNDU radio (1490 AM and 92.9 FM, later WNDV-FM), which were also owned by the university until 1998. However, like its radio sisters, it operated as a full-fledged commercial station rather than a non-profit public broadcaster (which is standard, and much like fellow NBC affiliate KOMU-TV in Columbia, Missouri, was and still is; after WNDU-TV was sold, this left KOMU and WVUA-CD/WVUA in Tuscaloosa, Alabama, as the only commercial TV stations owned by a university). On September 29, 1957, to much fanfare, WNDU-TV moved to UHF channel 16.

The station immediately took the NBC affiliation from WSJV (channel 28) and has been with the network ever since. WNDU-TV's early broadcast schedule included programs like Romper Room and the first local telecast of a Notre Dame football game. WNDU aired the children's program Sesame Street from 1970 until February 1974, when non-commercial PBS member station WNIT (channel 34) signed on the air. From 1967 to 1986, WNDU aired Beyond Our Control, a locally produced sketch comedy program, which was presented as part of the station's involvement in the Junior Achievement program.

The studio at State Road 933 and Dorr Road opened in 1982.

On October 18, 1995, as a result of the affiliation changes in the South Bend market, WSJV switched to Fox (it disaffiliated from Fox in 2016 and is a primary Heroes & Icons-affiliated station) and W58BT signed on as an ABC affiliate; it eventually became WBND. WNDU was one of the two stations that retained its network affiliation (the other was WSBT-TV, which retained its affiliation with CBS).

On November 24, 2005, the University of Notre Dame entered into an agreement to sell the station to Gray Television for $85 million in an all-cash deal, with the university placing the money received from the sale in an endowment. The sale closed on March 5, 2006, after which the Federal Communications Commission granted Gray a cross-ownership waiver for WNDU and Goshen-based newspaper The Goshen News. This was necessary because the FCC prohibits the common ownership of a newspaper and a television station in the same market (Gray eventually spun off the Times and four other newspapers the following year into a new company called Triple Crown Media, which was subsequently merged with Host Communications). WNDU-TV was named station of the year by the Indiana Broadcasters Association for 2015 and 2016.

In September 2015, Gray Television announced that it would purchase Schurz Communications for $442.5 million; Schurz had owned WSBT-TV since it began broadcasting in December 1952. Despite WSBT-TV's higher ratings, Gray kept WNDU and sold WSBT-TV to expedite approval of the deal; on October 1, 2015, Gray announced that WSBT-TV would be swapped to Sinclair Broadcast Group for WLUC-TV in Marquette, Michigan. The FCC approved the sale on February 12, 2016; the transaction would be completed four days later.

On February 1, 2021, Gray Television announced its intent to purchase Quincy Media, owner of Heroes & Icons affiliate WSJV, for $925 million in a cash transaction. As WSJV is lower ranked than the top four stations in ratings in the South Bend market, Gray sought a failing station waiver to permit common ownership of both WSJV and WNDU-TV. The sale was completed on August 2.

== Programming ==
As an NBC affiliate, WNDU-TV is the home station for the network's broadcast of Notre Dame football home games. It produces and airs its own pregame show, Countdown to Kickoff, which airs prior to every Notre Dame football home game broadcast on NBC. The station also airs reruns of Inside Notre Dame Football and Inside Notre Dame Basketball, a review show of Notre Dame athletic teams that is produced by Fighting Irish Media at the University of Notre Dame.

Due to an increased focus on news programming, WNDU-TV made room for a three-hour Saturday morning newscast in 1994, by airing NBC's teen-oriented program block TNBC in early hours of Saturday and Sunday mornings to fulfill E/I guidelines. WNDU currently airs the network's The More You Know programming block for two of the three hours on Saturday with the final hour airing on Sundays at 7 a.m. In addition, the station's primary channel preempts the Saturday edition of Today for its Saturday morning newscast with the program airing on its second digital subchannel instead; the primary channel airs the Sunday edition of Today on a one-hour delay in order to accommodate its Sunday morning newscast. Prior to its move to Peacock on September 12, 2022, WNDU aired the soap opera Days of Our Lives one hour later than most NBC affiliates at 2 p.m. local time.

=== Programming controversies ===
Under Notre Dame's ownership, WNDU opted not to air certain NBC programs out of concerns over inappropriate content. Such shows included the animated series God, the Devil and Bob (for content offensive to the religious values of the university) and the American version of the British sitcom Coupling (due to the program's sexual content). The latter series instead aired on WSBT-DT2, then South Bend's UPN affiliate, on Thursday nights after UPN programming. Neither show was renewed for a second season. The station also aired the Notre Dame commencement address of President Barack Obama in full on May 17, 2009 (four years after the university sold the station), in lieu of the first half of a Stanley Cup Playoff game.

=== News operation ===
WNDU-TV broadcasts a total of 38 1/2 hours of local newscasts each week (with 6 1/2 hours each weekday, four hours on Saturdays and two hours on Sundays). WNDU-TV used a helicopter for its news-gathering purposes from the 1980s through 2006. Past news anchors include Mike Collins and siblings Maureen and Terry McFadden. Past reporters include Mark Peterson, Tom Rinaldi, Hannah Storm, and Anne Thompson.

The station has had a weather department for most of its existence; its first chief meteorologist was Dick Addis, who worked at the station from 1965 until his retirement in 2001; other weather staff has included Cindi Clawson, Gordy Young, Frank Waugh, David Harker, and Mike Hoffman. The station also has a sports department, often covering Notre Dame sports; past sports staff includes Jeff Jeffers, Jack Nolan, and Chuck Freeby.

On April 21, 2010, starting with its noon newscast, WNDU became the second television station in the South Bend market (behind WSBT-TV) to begin broadcasting its local newscasts in high definition.

On September 4, 2018, WNDU debuted a 4 p.m. newscast.

As of 2024, there were twelve people on the news team and five on the weather team, in addition to there being a sports journalist team.

== Technical information ==
=== Subchannels ===
The station's signal is multiplexed:

Subchannels of WNDU-TV
Channel	Res.	Short name	Programming
16.1	1080i	WNDU	NBC
16.2	720p	365BLK	365BLK
16.3	480i	Antenna	Antenna TV
16.4	480i	Justice	True Crime Network
16.5	480i	IonPlus	Ion Plus
16.6	480i	Oxygen	Oxygen
16.7	480i	GetTV	Great

WNDU began broadcasting its digital signal on channel 42 in December 1998, becoming the first TV station in the South Bend market to do so.

WNDU's second digital subchannel formerly carried a standard-definition simulcast of the station's main channel (with limited programming substitutions for shows preempted on the main channel for local programming); the subchannel became affiliated with Antenna TV on July 1, 2013.

On October 1, 2024, WNDU announced that Chicago Sports Network, the television home of the Chicago Bulls, Chicago Blackhawks, and Chicago White Sox, would affiliate with its second and fourth subchannels. On June 6, 2025, following Comcast's carriage agreement with CHSN, it was announced that the network would leave the station on June 9 at midnight. At that time, a static card was displayed on both CHSN subchannels informing the viewer that the network had shut down its over-the-air service (interrupting a replay of an NBA game between the Los Angeles Lakers and Chicago Bulls from March 27 of that year), and the main CHSN subchannel switched to 365BLK a day later (despite WSJV already carrying the network at the time; following the station's sale to Sinclair Broadcast Group, the latter's 365BLK subchannel was replaced with The Nest on July 30). The card continued to be seen on the overflow subchannel until a week later when it was changed to a "New Programming Coming Soon" card, with the EPG title being "WNDU Programming".

=== Analog-to-digital conversion ===
WNDU-TV ended regular programming on its analog signal, over UHF channel 16 on February 17, 2009, the original target date on which full-power television stations in the United States were to transition from analog to digital broadcasts under federal mandate (which was later pushed back to June 12, 2009). The station's digital signal remained on its pre-transition UHF channel 42, using virtual channel 16.

As part of the SAFER Act, WNDU-TV kept its analog signal on the air until March 3 at 7 p.m. to inform viewers of the digital television transition through a loop of public service announcements from the National Association of Broadcasters.
