= WSJV =

Television station in Elkhart, Indiana

ATSC 3.0 station
- Elkhart–South Bend, Indiana; United States
- City: Elkhart, Indiana
- Channels: Digital: 30 (UHF); Virtual: 28

Programming
- Affiliations: 28.1: Roar; for others, see § Technical information and subchannels

Ownership
- Owner: Sinclair Broadcast Group; (WSBT Licensee, LLC)
- Sister stations: WSBT-TV

History
- First air date: March 20, 1954
- Former channel numbers: Analog: 52 (UHF, 1954–1958), 28 (UHF, 1958–2009); Digital: 58 (UHF, 2002–2009), 28 (UHF, 2009–2019)
- Former affiliations: ABC (1954–1995); NBC (1954–1955); DuMont (1954–1955); Fox (1995–2016); Heroes & Icons (2016–2025)
- Call sign meaning: St. Joseph River Valley

Technical information
- Licensing authority: FCC
- Facility ID: 74007
- ERP: 258 kW
- HAAT: 332.6 m (1,091 ft)
- Transmitter coordinates: 41°37′0″N 86°13′1″W

Links
- Public license information: Public file; LMS

WSJV (channel 28) is a television station licensed to Elkhart, Indiana, United States, serving the South Bend area with programming from the digital multicast network Roar. It is owned by Sinclair Broadcast Group alongside dual CBS/Fox affiliate WSBT-TV (channel 22). The two stations share studios on East Douglas Avenue in Mishawaka and transmitter facilities on Ironwood Road in southern South Bend.

WSJV began broadcasting in 1954 as the NBC and ABC affiliate for the Elkhart–South Bend area, losing NBC to WNDU-TV (channel 16) when that station started in 1955. It broadcast on channel 52 before moving to channel 28 in 1958. After Fox acquired the rights to National Football League games in 1994, it began looking for new affiliates in markets where it had none, with South Bend the largest such market. Quincy Newspapers then switched the station from ABC to Fox.

In 2016, Quincy sold the programming rights and Fox affiliation to WSBT-TV, where Fox became a subchannel. Since then, WSJV has broadcast national digital multicast television networks. Gray Television successfully petitioned the FCC to let it keep WSJV when it acquired Quincy in 2021 and traded it to Sinclair in 2025. WSJV serves as the market's ATSC 3.0 (NextGen TV) host station, with four other commercial stations in the market each broadcasting some of WSJV's subchannels in ATSC 1.0 format on its behalf.

== History ==
=== Truth Publishing Company ownership ===
The Truth Publishing Company, publisher of The Elkhart Truth and owner of WTRC radio (1340 AM and 100.7 FM), applied to the Federal Communications Commission (FCC) for a new television station on Elkhart's ultra high frequency (UHF) channel 52 in May 1953. The FCC granted the company a construction permit on June 3, 1953, approving the second station in the South Bend–Elkhart area. Construction began in late 1953; the station was located southwest of Elkhart. In November, the station signed to become an affiliate of ABC.

WSJV began broadcasting on March 20, 1954; a test pattern had gone out on March 15 and 16 before the new antenna suffered a fault that required emergency repairs and postponed the planned March 17 sign-on date. Power was increased twelvefold in November when a new transmitter was installed. The station originally aired programs from ABC, NBC, and the DuMont Television Network; NBC affiliated with the new WNDU-TV the next year, while DuMont wound down operations.

In 1957, the FCC approved the assignment of lower UHF channels to WSBT-TV (from channel 34 to 22) and WSJV (from channel 52 to 28); it had already allowed WNDU-TV to switch from channel 46 to 16. This required a relocation of UHF channel assignments among several localities in Illinois, Indiana, and Michigan. For WSJV, the change also brought a relocation of the tower site from Elkhart to a location near Mishawaka. The channel switch took place on February 14, 1958; it was the last of the three stations to move to the lower channel it was assigned. The station began to broadcast in color on October 7, 1963, with three ABC color programs being broadcast every week.

After the station invested in purchasing color tape and film equipment, WSJV began broadcasting non-network programs in color in 1966, five years after ABC began airing some of its programs in color in 1961. In 1968, the station bought two color television cameras and began airing all of its locally produced shows in color. Local programs from the station's early years included Kidsville, U.S.A. and two shows featuring puppet DD Donovan. Truth Publishing also expanded its operation in television by buying WKJG radio and television in Fort Wayne in 1957; the Fort Wayne outlets were sold in 1971. The station group was promoted as the Communicana Group.

=== Quincy Newspapers ownership ===
In 1974, Truth Publishing sold WSJV for $3.2 million to Quincy Newspapers Inc. (QNI) of Quincy, Illinois; it retained the radio stations, which continued to operate for a time from the same building. At the time, Quincy's only television property was WGEM-TV in its home city. The sale earned Truth Publishing a tax certificate from the FCC because it broke up cross-ownership of the South Bend cable system, which was founded by the three major commercial stations in the market. In 1976, the station debuted an 11 p.m. newscast, having previously only broadcast local news at 6 p.m.

On April 3, 1988, the station's tower was partially toppled by a windstorm. The station began broadcasting at reduced power the next day, but a replacement mast was not put into service until November.

WSJV began airing weekend newscasts for the first time in its history in 1992; the station had previously only aired weeknight newscasts at 6 and 11 p.m., which news director and 20-year employee Larry Ford believed had severely hurt its local image and contributed to its status as a distant third in Michiana television news. The move came after Don Fuller, a charter station employee who had been general manager for WSJV since 1965, retired that year. Under Ford's replacement, Jim Parisi, the station added a 5 p.m. newscast featuring an interactive news format soliciting feedback from viewers by telephone and email, the first such newscast in the United States; Parisi, who co-anchored, could read emails live on air from a computer placed on the news set. The station also debuted a half-hour morning local newscast and sought to increase its presence in areas of the market beyond Elkhart so as to reduce the perception it was "an Elkhart station".

=== Affiliation switch to Fox ===
In December 1993, Fox gained the broadcast rights to televise games from the NFL's National Football Conference, which firmly established Fox as the fourth national network. After this acquisition, it began a campaign to upgrade its affiliate base. South Bend was the largest market in the United States without a dedicated Fox affiliate; throughout the 1994 NFL season, CBS affiliate WSBT-TV aired both Fox programming and Chicago Bears football and lost the rights to air 60 Minutes as a result.

Quincy signed an agreement with Fox on April 19, 1995, to become a full-time Fox affiliate on October 18 of that year and begin carrying its NFL games sooner. With the other two secular commercial television stations in the market uninterested in switching affiliations, ABC faced the prospect of having cable systems import affiliates from nearby markets. In August, Weigel Broadcasting, which had a South Bend translator for its flagship station, WCIU-TV in Chicago, obtained the rights to the ABC affiliation for South Bend and launched a low-power station, "WBND", in time for the switch to take place.

In retaliation for Quincy's decision to spurn ABC for Fox in South Bend, the network pulled its programming from WREX in Rockford, Illinois, which had recently been acquired by Quincy. ABC moved its Rockford affiliation to WTVO, the previous NBC affiliate in that market; it had recently made a significant investment into WTVO's owner, Young Broadcasting.

Prior to WSJV's launch as South Bend's first Fox affiliate, Fox programming was viewed in the market via WFLD in Chicago, as well as the cable-only Foxnet network. To coincide with the affiliation switch, WSJV relaunched and shuffled its news offerings. It moved its late news into prime time and saw growing ratings. However, the two-hour morning show, Wake Up, failed to attract viewers: originally aired from 6 to 8 a.m., it moved to 7–9 a.m. in July 1996 to compete against the network morning shows, though it later moved back. This trend continued into the early 2000s; in one Nielsen survey in 2001, WSJV's morning newscast drew a fraction of the offerings of its competitor, while 12 percent of households watching TV at the time tuned to WSJV's late newscast. This was ascribed to the fewer news resources at channel 28's command as well as its location in Elkhart. In 2003, the morning newscast was extended to air for three hours, and an early evening newscast at 5:30 p.m. was introduced; this was the only newscast aired year-round at that time slot in the market, because program schedules changed in the market during daylight saving time.

WSJV began broadcasting a digital signal in October 2002; having been assigned channel 58 by the FCC, its launch forced WBND-LP to move to channel 57. The station shut down its analog signal on February 17, 2009, the original digital television transition date for full-power stations, joining WNDU-TV and WSBT-TV in doing so. The station's digital signal relocated from its pre-transition UHF channel 58, which was among the high band UHF channels (52–69) that were removed from broadcasting use as a result of the transition, to channel 28 for post-transition operations.

=== Loss of Fox affiliation ===
In June and July 2016, the station's general manager and news director stepped down and moved to other Quincy Media stations. The South Bend Tribune reported the possibility that Quincy was planning to shut down WSJV and consolidate its Fox affiliation onto another station in the market so it could sell WSJV in the FCC's then-forthcoming spectrum incentive auction—which would allow stations to relinquish their broadcast spectrum to the FCC in exchange for a share of the profit from its resale to wireless providers as part of a reallocation process. Spectrum was said to be particularly valuable in the South Bend market due to its proximity to several major markets such as Chicago and Indianapolis.

On July 25, 2016, Quincy announced the transfer of the Fox affiliation rights to Sinclair Broadcast Group's WSBT-TV in exchange for the ABC and CW affiliations in Peoria, Illinois, from Sinclair-owned WHOI. WSBT then announced that it would replace its two existing subchannels with Fox Michiana, beginning on August 1, 2016. For a 60-day transition period until September 30, the new service was simulcast by WSJV to allow viewers and pay television providers time to transition from the former signal.

Along with the transfer, the WSJV newsroom closed down, as the WSBT-TV newsroom was expanded to produce morning and late evening newscasts for Fox Michiana. WSBT-TV hired some of the former WSJV news staff; others went to other Quincy stations. After the transition, the station was reduced to a skeleton crew and became mostly a pass-through for the Heroes & Icons network. Quincy donated the station's entire news and tape archive to the Indiana University Libraries Moving Image Archive; equipment from WSJV was shipped elsewhere in the company.

=== Gray and Sinclair ownership ===
On February 1, 2021, Gray Television, owner of WNDU-TV, announced its intent to purchase Quincy Media for $925 million in a cash transaction. As WSJV was lower-rated than the top four stations in ratings in the South Bend market (not counting Weigel's low-power stations but including WHME-TV), Gray sought a failing station waiver to permit common ownership of both WSJV and WNDU-TV. The sale was completed on August 2.

Gray and Sinclair filed with the FCC in 2025 to trade WSJV for WHOI, which resulted in Sinclair owning both the WSJV and WSBT licenses.

== Technical information and subchannels ==
The station's subchannels are carried in ATSC 1.0 format on the multiplexed signals of other South Bend-area television stations:

Subchannels provided by WSJV (ATSC 1.0)
Subchannel	Res.	Short name	Programming	ATSC 1.0 host
28.1	480i	ROAR	Roar	WSBT-TV
28.2	480i	COMET	Comet	WNIT
28.3	480i	MYSTERY	Ion Mystery	WNIT
28.4	720p	CourtTV	Court TV	WHME-TV
28.5	480i	THENEST	The Nest	WNIT
28.6	480i	Bounce	Bounce TV	WSBT-TV
28.7	480i	Rewind	Rewind TV	WHME-TV

The main subchannels of WNDU-TV, WSBT-TV, WSJV, WNIT, and WHME-TV, plus WSBT-TV's Fox subchannel, are broadcast by WSJV in 3.0 format from its transmitter on Ironwood Road in southern South Bend:

Subchannels of WSJV (ATSC 3.0)
Subchannel	Res.	Short name	Programming
16.1	1080p	WNDU	NBC (WNDU-TV)
22.1	1080p	CBS	CBS (WSBT-TV)
22.2	720p	FOX	Fox (WSBT-TV)
22.10	1080p	T2	T2
22.11	1080p	PBTV	Pickleballtv
22.20		GMLOOP	GameLoop
28.1	480p	ROAR	Roar
34.1	1080p	PBS	PBS (WNIT)
46.1	720p	WHME-HD	Univision (WHME-TV)

Subchannel broadcast with digital rights management
Subchannel streamed via the internet
