= Family Broadcasting Corporation =

Christian evangelical television network

- Country: United States
- Headquarters: South Bend, Indiana, United States

Programming
- Language: English
- Picture format: 1080i (HDTV); 480i (SDTV)

History
- Launched: 1972
- Founder: Lester Sumrall
- Former names: LeSEA Broadcasting

Links
- Webcast: World Harvest Television
- Website: www.familybroadcastingcorporation.com

Network's former logo

Family Broadcasting Corporation, formerly known as LeSEA Broadcasting, is an American Christian television network. Founded by Lester Sumrall in 1972, Family Broadcasting Corporation is headquartered in South Bend, Indiana, and broadcasts Christian and family programming. Peter Sumrall, son of Lester Sumrall, served as its president and chief executive officer from 2002 to 2015. His son, Drew Sumrall, now serves in the same position.

== National channels ==
=== World Harvest Television (WHT) ===
World Harvest Television (WHT), on DirecTV, focuses mostly on direct televangelism, carrying hosts such as Sid Roth, Joseph Prince, Joyce Meyer, and James Robison. Program time not filled by televangelists is filled with infomercials; WHT does air some limited entertainment programming, consisting mainly of a block of Westerns in the afternoons and in the overnight graveyard slot, along with non-religious E/I programs and a few syndicated programs such as Sports Stars of Tomorrow and America's Heartland on Saturdays. WHT is available in over 21.2 million homes across the country on DirecTV, as well as on the Sky Angel Faith Package; a video stream of the channel is available on the Internet.

=== Family Entertainment Television (FETV) ===
Family Entertainment Television (FETV), on DirecTV Stream, DirecTV, Dish Network, Verizon Fios, AT&T U-Verse, Frndly TV, and Sling TV offers viewers a mix of religious and family-friendly programming. FETV provides such programming as Perry Mason, The Lone Ranger, Hazel, and Bewitched as well as a selection of televangelists in the morning time slots.

=== Family Movie Classics (FMC) ===
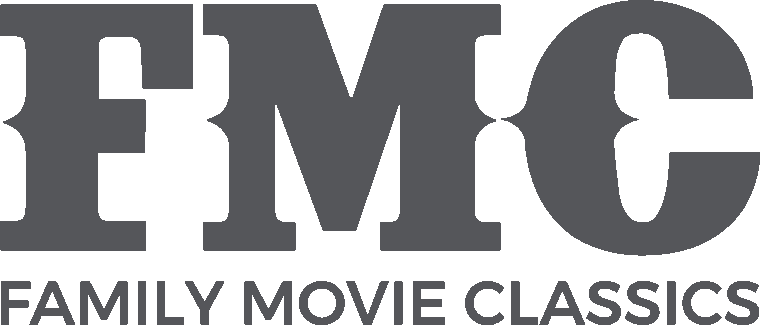

Family Movie Classics (FMC) is an American cable and satellite television network owned by the Family Broadcasting Corporation. The network features classic movies. FMC launched on October 28, 2021, on Dish Network to 9 million subscribers. In 2022, streaming services Frndly TV, DirecTV Stream and Philo added the movie service to their offerings.

== FBC-owned TV stations ==
=== WHMB-TV ===
Originally acquired by Family Broadcasting Corporation in 1972, WHMB-TV 40 was the longest continually operated Christian television station in the United States. WHMB-TV is now affiliated with the Univision network broadcasting Spanish-language programming to Hispanic/Latino viewers in the Indianapolis and Central Indiana viewing area, and soon to have local Spanish-language newscasts every day that will include a one-hour local morning newscast on weekdays, Noticias N+ Univision Indianapolis 6am and 6:30am leading into the national morning show Despierta América, with Edición Digital Indianapolis at 12:30pm after Noticiero N+ Univision: Edición Digital and Noticias N+ Univision Indianapolis weeknights leading into the national evening newscasts, Noticiero N+ Univision starts to air, and for weekend evenings at 6 and 11pm. WHMB reaches the entire Indianapolis, Indiana, television market.

=== WHME-TV ===
On September 10, 1977, WHME-TV 46 South Bend came onto the airwaves with mostly religious programming, as well as some family programming. Today, WHME is Family Broadcasting Corporation's headquarters, housing a number of separate divisions. WHME-TV formerly aired programming that was a blend of religious programming (local and national), local sports, and family entertainment. It is now a Univision affiliate airing Spanish-language programming to Hispanic/Latino viewers in the Michiana viewing area, and soon to have local Spanish-language newscasts every day that will include a one-hour local morning newscast on weekdays, Noticias N+ Univision South Bend 6am and 6:30am leading into the national morning show Despierta América with Edición Digital South Bend at 12:30pm after Noticiero N+ Univision: Edición Digital and Noticias N+ Univision South Bend weeknights leading into the national evening newscasts, Noticiero N+ Univision starts to air, and for weekend evenings at 6 and 11pm.

=== KWHE ===
KWHE TV 14 covers the major population centers of Hilo, Maui, Kona, and Honolulu, with Christian and family programming. The station is carried on Oceanic Cable channel 11 and on Hawaiian Telcom channel 14.

== Former television stations ==
=== KWHB ===
Purchased by Family Broadcasting Corporation in 1985, KWHB 47 is the oldest Christian television station in Tulsa, Oklahoma. Today, KWHB can be viewed on over 84 cable stations in Oklahoma, serving a potential audience of over 1.5 million people. The station was sold to the Christian Television Network on February 20, 2020.

=== WHFT ===
WHFT TV 45 Miami, Florida signed on in 1975, was acquired by LeSea in the summer of 1976, and was sold to Trinity Broadcasting Network in July 1980.

=== WHKE ===
WHKE signed on in June 1988 and was owned by LeSea. The station was sold to Paxson Communications in 1995, being a temporary affiliate of the paid programming network inTV before the August 1998 launch of PAX TV, today's Ion Television.

=== WHNO ===
WHNO TV 20 New Orleans signed on in October 1994. The station was sold to the Christian Television Network in April 2018.

=== WCVI-TV ===
WCVI-TV 23 was acquired in 2014 and is the Family Broadcasting Corporation station in the U.S. Virgin Islands. The station was sold to Lilly Broadcasting in 2020, and now serves as Christiansted's CBS and ABC affiliate via two subchannels.

=== METV ===
Middle East Television was acquired from Christian Broadcasting Network in July 2001. It is located in Limassol, Cyprus, and broadcasts to all of Western Asia. The station was sold to Sid Roth's Messianic Vision, Inc., in September 2016.

== Radio ==
=== Shortwave ===
Since 1985 Family Broadcasting Corporation has operated World Harvest Radio International (WHRI), designed to reach the over 200 million shortwave radio receivers in the world. Family Broadcasting Corporation is the only Christian broadcaster currently operating a global network of shortwave radio transmitters. Transmitter facilities are located in South Carolina and in Palau, Oceania (T8WH). Six transmitters are in operation full-time, named the Six Angels.

- Angel 1—Covers Africa, North America, Central America, South America, and Australia
- Angel 2—Covers parts of North America, Europe, and parts of Asia
- Angel 3—Covers Asia (T8WH)
- Angel 4—Covers Australia (T8WH)
- Angel 5—Covers Africa
- Angel 6—Covers North and Central America

In August 2020, it was announced that WHRI was selling its facilities to Allen Weiner, owner of Monticello, Maine-based shortwave station WBCQ, pending FCC approval.

=== FBC-owned FM radio stations ===
==== Harvest FM ====
Harvest 103.1 FM, or WHME (FM), began broadcasting in 1968. The radio station, which serves the South Bend, Indiana, area, features a mix of interactive talk, Bible teaching programs, and inspirational music 24 hours a day.

==== Pulse FM ====
Founded in 1996, Pulse FM WHPZ 96.9 broadcasts contemporary Christian music to the Michiana market. In December 2004, Family Broadcasting Corporation purchased WDOW 92.1 FM to increase Pulse FM's listening base, and the call letters are now WHPD 92.1. For many years, the radio station hosted World Pulse Festival, a one-day Christian music festival. In 2017, Pulse FM transitioned to a new concert format named Pulse Summer Series, a series of three summer concerts in downtown South Bend, Indiana, at the Morris Performing Arts Center.
