= WNIT (TV) =

Television station in South Bend, Indiana

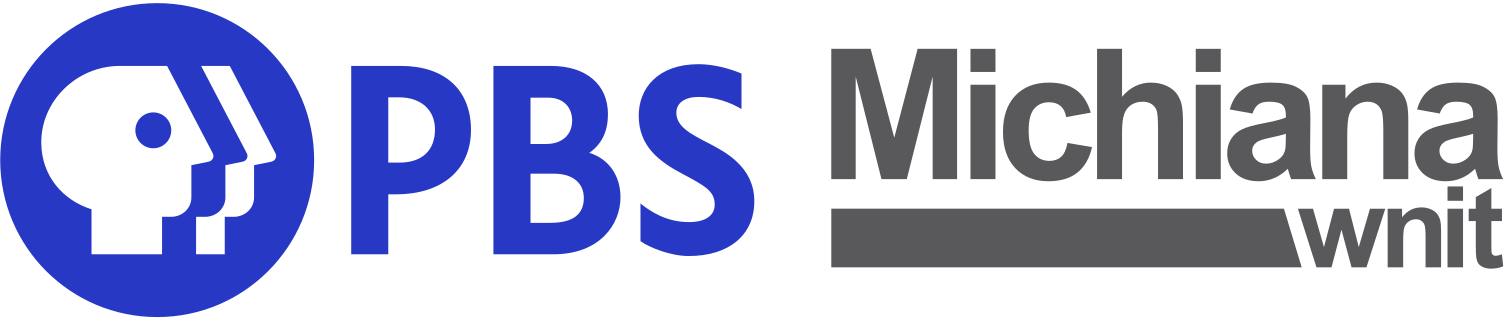

- South Bend, Indiana; United States
- Channels: Digital: 31 (UHF); Virtual: 34
- Branding: PBS Michiana

Programming
- Affiliations: 34.1: PBS; for others, see § Subchannels

Ownership
- Owner: Michiana Public Broadcasting Corporation

History
- Founded: December 1972
- First air date: January 31, 1974
- Former call signs: WNIT (CP, 1972–1974); WNIT-TV (1974–1989)
- Former channel numbers: Analog: 34 (UHF, 1974–2008); Digital: 35 (UHF, 2003–2019)
- Call sign meaning: Northern Indiana Television

Technical information
- Licensing authority: FCC
- Facility ID: 41671
- ERP: 78.3 kW
- HAAT: 332.9 m (1,092 ft)
- Transmitter coordinates: 41°36′49.2″N 86°11′20″W

Links
- Public license information: Public file; LMS
- Website: www.wnit.org

WNIT (channel 34), branded as PBS Michiana, is a PBS member television station in South Bend, Indiana, United States, owned by the Michiana Public Broadcasting Corporation. The station's studios are located at the Center for Public Media at the corner of Lafayette and Jefferson Boulevards in downtown South Bend, and its transmitter is located in southern South Bend, just off the St. Joseph Valley Parkway.

WNIT began broadcasting on January 31, 1974, culminating more than five years of effort to establish a public television station for Michiana. It originally broadcast from studios—and, beginning in 1985, offices—at the Elkhart Area Career Center. A 2009 fire destroyed the offices in Elkhart; in 2010, it moved to downtown South Bend after receiving a donation of the former studio of WSBT-TV and upgrading the structure for its own use. WNIT produces local programming on Michiana issues and culture.

== History ==
=== Construction and early years in Elkhart ===
In June 1968, an effort began to construct and operate an educational television station in South Bend, Indiana, on channel 34. The Michiana Public Broadcasting Corporation was formed by 19 people in South Bend, Elkhart, and Mishawaka. It envisioned a station offering educational programs for schools by day and programming for the community at night. The group initially estimated it would be on the air by September 1969, but the application to the Federal Communications Commission (FCC) was not made until April 1969. The group filed for a federal grant from the United States Office of Education, but the office awarded its money to higher-priority projects, forcing Michiana Public to try again and find more support in the community. By the time a second application was made, the corporation had reached a deal with the Elkhart Community School Corporation to operate the station and with a second group, Citizens for Better Television, that wanted to set up the noncommercial station itself.

Michiana Public Broadcasting Corporation received a $364,000 grant in April 1972 to fund station construction. The FCC granted the construction permit on April 26, and the station took the call sign WNIT in August. In August 1973, Michiana Public acquired a transmitter, antenna, and studio equipment from KFIZ-TV in Fond du Lac, Wisconsin. and a transmitter building was prepared at Ironwood and Kern roads. The station hoped to start telecasting in December 1973 and then in January 1974, due to delayed arrival of the equipment from Fond du Lac. WNIT began test broadcasting on January 31, 1974, with afternoon and daytime programming, and received final authorization on May 1, telecasting six days a week. It held its first on-air auction fundraiser in April 1975 and was connected to PBS by satellite in 1978.

By 1980, channel 34 had 5,300 members, with membership, auction proceeds, and federal funding from the Corporation for Public Broadcasting each making up more than 20 percent of the station's revenue. It had three local programs: the talk show Straight Talk; The Mary Fischer Show, focusing on topics concerning seniors; and Images, an arts magazine. Its only general manager to that time, Thomas Brubaker, resigned in 1983 and was replaced by Donald Checots of KAWE in Bemidji, Minnesota. Under Checots, the station's offices moved from the 100 Center complex in Mishawaka to modular buildings on the studio site at the Elkhart Area Career Center.

When it was built, WNIT used a 500-foot (150 m) tower site donated to the station by WNDU-TV (channel 16), and the original lease term had been surpassed by 1987. In 1989, the station received a federal grant to purchase a new transmitter, enabling a 50-percent power increase to 1.5 million watts as well as broadcasting in stereo. In the meantime, the original transmitter became less reliable, leading to more frequent outages. The new tower on Johnson Street and transmitter were activated on February 15, 1991.

Trina Cutter became WNIT's general manager in 1994. When Cutter arrived, the station had only one local program that was not the auction or a pledge drive, Capitol Views, later known as Politically Speaking. In 1999, WNIT debuted a new Sunday afternoon program, Open Studio, a four-hour afternoon showcase of local talent and community topics that served as its flagship local production. Each program, which spotlighted a specific local community, had segments on arts and community issues and integrated Politically Speaking. Open Studio also spun off several new programs on the outdoors and literature. The station also took its first steps toward converting to digital broadcasting by upgrading its cameras. Cutter departed in 2002 to run WNEO–WEAO in her home state of Ohio and was replaced by Mary Pruess, previously of WHRO-TV in Norfolk, Virginia. In response to rioting in Benton Harbor, Michigan, the station produced a discussion of that community's issues which evolved into the public affairs series Michiana Week.

=== Relocation to South Bend and digital era ===
WNIT began broadcasting digitally on channel 35 on April 30, 2003. WNIT's analog signal ceased on March 12, 2008, after three weeks of half-power operation as the klystron tubes on the transmitter failed. Since the digital conversion was planned within a year anyway, it was decided to not replace the tubes owing to their high cost. The station's digital signal remained on its pre-transition UHF channel 35, using virtual channel 34, until it was later repacked to channel 31 in 2019 as a result of the 2016 United States wireless spectrum auction.

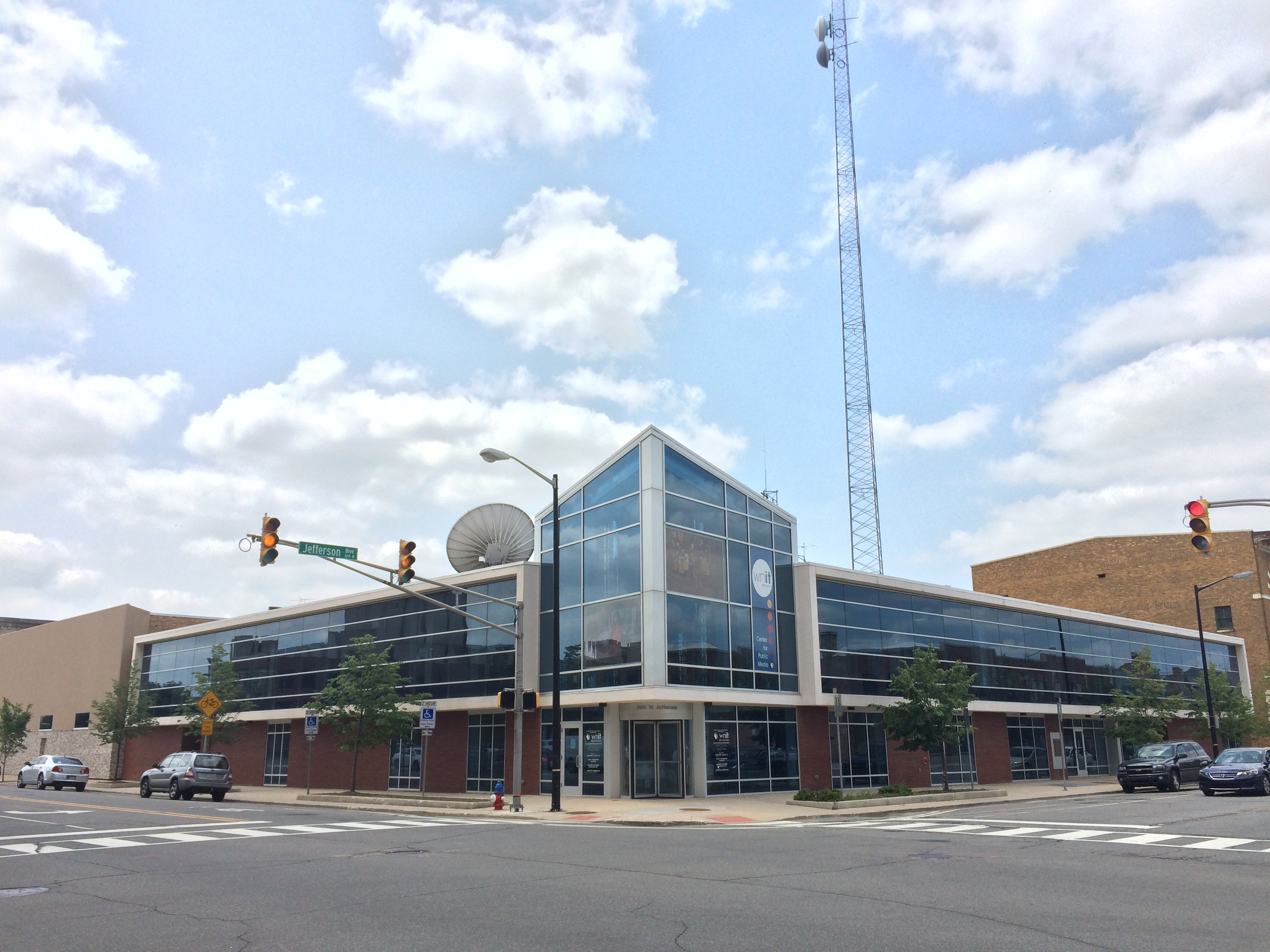
Wide view of the WNIT Center for Public Media

After having broadcast from the Elkhart Area Career Center since its sign-on, with its lease soon to end with the Elkhart schools, WNIT sought a more visible location. It first explored sites in Elkhart, including downtown. But no location in Elkhart worked out, and in 2006 WNIT accepted an offer of the studios WSBT-TV (channel 22) would leave behind when it moved to an under-construction facility in Mishawaka. The city of South Bend contributed to the renovation costs, including paying for the construction of a three-story glass atrium on the corner of Jefferson and Lafayette boulevards. While construction was under way in South Bend, a fire destroyed the modular buildings housing WNIT's offices on January 11, 2009. The studios, in a separate structure, and control facility were not affected, but business records were lost. The roof caved in, making it difficult for investigators to determine a cause. New offices were set up on Franklin Street in Elkhart while construction in South Bend continued. The WNIT Center for Public Media became home to office staff, master control, and studio functions gradually over the course of 2010. For the first time, all of the station's operations were under one roof. The new facility was 30,000 square feet (2,800 m^{2}), in comparison with the 8,500 square feet (790 m^{2}) WNIT had at the Elkhart Area Career Center, and had a studio twice the size as well as a community room.

Pruess departed in 2012 and was replaced by Greg Giczi, a longtime leader of the production house associated with WNDU-TV and a former chief executive of KAET in Phoenix, Arizona. Under Giczi, the station debuted a weekly program, EducationCounts_Michiana, on local education issues. WNIT also moved to add the PBS Kids channel, which it could not do without replacing outdated equipment. Giczi retired in 2025 and was replaced by WNIT's development director, Amanda Miller Kelley. In response to cuts to public broadcasting funding triggered by the Rescissions Act of 2025 and a new budget in Indiana, the station laid off five of its 28 employees that August. Some of the cuts were counterbalanced by a grant from the Public Media Bridge Fund.

== Local programming ==
Regular local programming on WNIT includes the series Dinner & a Book, EducationCounts_Michigan, Outdoor Elements, and Experience Michiana.

== Funding ==
For the year ending September 30, 2025, the Michiana Public Broadcasting Corporation reported $4.51 million in revenue, of which $1.07 million came from the Corporation for Public Broadcasting in the agency's final year. Members supplied $1.7 million in income.

== Subchannels ==
WNIT's transmitter is located in southern South Bend, just off the St. Joseph Valley Parkway. The station's signal is multiplexed:

Subchannels of WNIT
Subchannel	Res.	Short name	Programming
34.1	1080i	WNIT-HD	PBS
34.2	480i	WNIT-SD	Create
34.3	480i	WNIT-KC	PBS Kids
34.4	480i	WNIT-WX	Weather Michiana WNIT 4
34.5	480i	Learn	Michigan Learning Channel
28.2	480i	COMET	Comet (WSJV)
28.3	480i	MYSTERY	Ion Mystery (WSJV)
28.5	480i	THENEST	The Nest (WSJV)

Broadcast on behalf of another station
