= Lester Sumrall =

American evangelist (1913–1996)

- Sumrall in 1996
- Born: Lester Frank Sumrall; February 15, 1913; New Orleans, Louisiana, U.S.
- Died: 28 April 1996 (aged 83); South Bend, Indiana, U.S.
- Resting place: Palmer Prairie Cemetery
- Occupations: Clergyman, Teacher, Philanthropist
- Movement: Pentecostalism
- Spouse: Louise Layman
- Children: 3

Lester Frank Sumrall (February 15, 1913 – April 28, 1996) was an American Pentecostal pastor, evangelist, teacher, and missionary. He founded the Lester Sumrall Evangelistic Association (LeSEA) and its humanitarian arm LeSEA Global Feed the Hungry, World Harvest Radio International, and World Harvest Bible College.

== Life and career ==
Sumrall was born on February 15, 1913, in New Orleans, Louisiana, to George Sumrall and Betty (née Chandler) Sumrall. He began preaching at the age of 17 after a recovery from tuberculosis. At the age of 19, he founded a church in Green Forest, Arkansas, and was ordained by the Assemblies of God.

In 1934, Sumrall began traveling abroad. He preached in Tahiti and New Zealand and established a church in Brisbane, Australia. He traveled with Howard Carter throughout eastern Asia and Europe. In South America, Sumrall met Louise Layman. The couple were married on September 30, 1944, and had three children: Frank Lester (1946–2025), Phillip Stephen (1950–2026) and Peter Andrew (1953–2015).

Several decades later Sumrall wrote about his experiences seeing deliverance from demons; his work was influential in spreading the concept of demons residing in "dark" or non-Christian regions of the world.

Sumrall and his family spent many years in the Philippines during the 1950s. He flew to Manila, Philippines, upon learning about the possession of Clarita Villanueva, whom he have delivered from two demonic entities in 1953. The culmination of his evangelistic work in the country was the establishment of the Cathedral of Praise in Manila. With over 24,000 members, it is the largest congregation in the Philippines.

In 1957, Sumrall established the Lester Sumrall Evangelistic Association. He would also found World Harvest Bible College (now Indiana Christian University) and World Harvest Magazine. In 1963 Sumrall moved to South Bend, Indiana to pastor Christian Center Cathedral of Praise (now Christian Center Church). It was around this time that he withdrew from the Assemblies of God denomination.

In 1968, Sumrall began what would become World Harvest Missionary Evangelism (WHME-FM). Sumrall has been called the "father of Christian television". From 1972 to 1997, he acquired television stations throughout the United States as part of World Harvest Television (also known as LeSEA Broadcasting). In 1987, Sumrall established a humanitarian aid organization, LeSEA Global Feed the Hungry.

Sumrall wrote many works during his lifetime ranging from topics such as evangelism, miraculous healing, demons and exorcism, angels and more. Some of his works were of a more polemic nature such as warning about the supposed dangers and detrimental effects of movies and Roman Catholicism. He also wrote some autobiographical works: Adventuring with Christ, The Life Story of Lester Sumrall: The Man, the Ministry, the Vision (as told to Tim Dudley), Through Blood and Fire in Latin America, and My Three Sons.

Sumrall died on April 28, 1996, at age 83, a week after being admitted to St. Joseph's Regional Medical Center in South Bend for spinal meningitis.

== Works (selected) ==
- Adventuring with Christ; illustrated, 128 pp.
- Dominion is Yours!, 1981
- Ecstasy: Finding Joy in Living, 151 pp. Thomas Nelson, 1980.
- The Gifts and Ministries of the Holy Spirit, 1985
- Roman Catholicism Slays, 61 pp. Zondervan, 1940.
- The Will, The Potent Force of the Universe, 1985, 66 pp. LeSEA Publishing Co.
- Worshipers of the Silver Screen; with a foreword by Edith Mae Pennington, 64 pp.

== Bibliography ==
- Lester Sumrall (1983). 101 Questions and Answers on Demon Powers. Harrison House (OK). ISBN 0-89274-261-5.
- Lester Sumrall (2003) [1993]. The Life Story of Lester Sumrall: The Man, the Ministry, the Vision. New Leaf Press (AR). ISBN 0-89221-532-1.
- Murphy, Leona Sumrall (1984) Miracles and the Sumrall Family. Praise Books
