= Monticello, Maine =

Town in Maine, United States

- Town
- Location of Monticello, Maine
- Coordinates: 46°19′33″N 67°52′30″W
- Country: United States
- State: Maine
- County: Aroostook

Area
  - Total: 38.41 sq mi (99.48 km^{2})
  - Land: 38.24 sq mi (99.04 km^{2})
  - Water: 0.17 sq mi (0.44 km^{2})
- Elevation: 545 ft (166 m)

Population (2020)
  - Total: 737
  - Density: 19/sq mi (7.4/km^{2})
- Time zone: UTC−5 (Eastern (EST))
  - Summer (DST): UTC−4 (EDT)
- ZIP code: 04760
- Area code: 207
- FIPS code: 23-46685
- GNIS feature ID: 582604

Monticello is a town in Aroostook County, Maine, United States on the northern branch of the Meduxnekeag River. The population was 737 at the 2020 census.

== History ==
Originally known as Wellington Township, Monticello was settled in 1830 by General Joel Wellington, who owned it, and incorporated in 1846.

Some of the earlier migrant workers of Monticello were called the “Amerisee”—a currently disbanded tribe whose members consisted of tribal people from all five Wabanaki Maine tribes, who traveled together as migrant seasonal workers. Many of them had settled in the Monticello and other Aroostook County areas. The word “Amerisee” comes from the Mi’kmaq word “Amase’jijg” which means “some distance” or “quite far” in reference to the distance they traveled for work, which often included all areas of Canada and Aroostook County Maine. The Matthew(s) family shows up in the 1900 Census for Monticello Maine. They had intended to form a sixth tribe—one that accepted members from all five tribes who were originally one tribe, but due to colonization, it had been split up into the five groups known today. The Amerisee wished to reunite the five tribes. The attempt ultimately failed and the Amerisee tribal members, were reabsorbed into their tribes of origin. John Matthew (Mathieu, Mathew and Matthews—alternative spellings for the same family), who is listed on the 1900 Census in Monticello Maine along with his family, writes that he is “Amerisee” however under “Tribe of Father of this Indian” and “Tribe of Mother of this Indian” he says they were both “mi’kmaw” which is the Mi’kmaq word for “Mi’kmaq”. His children were listed as Frank, Lizzie and Annie (Anastasia) Matthew. His parents were Frank and Bertha Matthew(s). He was also a basket maker. According to his death record, he was born in “Restigouche Ind.” territory, which is a testament to how far they would travel to reach farmland in places such as Monticello. John Matthew and other families like his, make up an interesting Native American element to Monticello's migrant seasonal and farm work history. International shortwave broadcast station WBCQ is located here.

== Geography ==
According to the United States Census Bureau, the town has a total area of 38.41 square miles (99.48 km^{2}), of which 38.24 square miles (99.04 km^{2}) is land and 0.17 square miles (0.44 km^{2}) is water.

== Demographics ==
Historical population
Census	Pop.	Note	%±
1850	227		—
1860	483		112.8%
1870	760		57.3%
1880	965		27.0%
1890	1,132		17.3%
1900	1,332		17.7%
1910	1,297		−2.6%
1920	1,268		−2.2%
1930	1,467		15.7%
1940	1,504		2.5%
1950	1,284		−14.6%
1960	1,109		−13.6%
1970	1,072		−3.3%
1980	950		−11.4%
1990	872		−8.2%
2000	790		−9.4%
2010	790		0.0%
2020	737		−6.7%
U.S. Decennial Census

=== 2010 census ===
As of the census of 2010, there were 790 people, 343 households, and 224 families living in the town. The population density was 20.7 inhabitants per square mile (8.0/km^{2}). There were 422 housing units at an average density of 11.0 per square mile (4.2/km^{2}). The racial makeup of the town was 92.9% White, 0.3% African American, 4.6% Native American, 0.3% Asian, and 2.0% from two or more races. Hispanic or Latino of any race were 0.3% of the population.

There were 343 households, of which 23.6% had children under the age of 18 living with them, 52.2% were married couples living together, 7.9% had a female householder with no husband present, 5.2% had a male householder with no wife present, and 34.7% were non-families. 29.4% of all households were made up of individuals, and 13.5% had someone living alone who was 65 years of age or older. The average household size was 2.30 and the average family size was 2.82.

The median age in the town was 47.1 years. 18% of residents were under the age of 18; 7.8% were between the ages of 18 and 24; 20.6% were from 25 to 44; 34.4% were from 45 to 64; and 19.2% were 65 years of age or older. The gender makeup of the town was 52.2% male and 47.8% female.

=== 2000 census ===
As of the census of 2000, there were 790 people, 325 households, and 230 families living in the town. The population density was 20.7 people per square mile (8.0/km^{2}). There were 420 housing units at an average density of 11.0 per square mile (4.2/km^{2}). The racial makeup of the town was 93.29% White, 4.43% Native American, 0.51% Asian, 0.89% from other races, and 0.89% from two or more races. Hispanic or Latino of any race were 0.13% of the population.

There were 325 households, out of which 28.6% had children under the age of 18 living with them, 59.7% were married couples living together, 6.2% had a female householder with no husband present, and 29.2% were non-families. 24.0% of all households were made up of individuals, and 14.8% had someone living alone who was 65 years of age or older. The average household size was 2.43 and the average family size was 2.90.

In the town, the age distribution of the population shows 22.5% under the age of 18, 7.1% from 18 to 24, 24.6% from 25 to 44, 26.6% from 45 to 64, and 19.2% who were 65 years of age or older. The median age was 42 years. For every 100 females, there were 92.2 males. For every 100 females age 18 and over, there were 96.2 males.

The median income for a household in the town was $23,566, and the median income for a family was $30,000. Males had a median income of $21,688 versus $17,431 for females. The per capita income for the town was $12,489. About 6.8% of families and 12.1% of the population were below the poverty line, including 6.8% of those under age 18 and 22.6% of those age 65 or over.

== Notable people ==
- Donald Ardell, state legislator
- William Coperthwaite, educator and yurt advocate; born in Monticello
- Max Good, college basketball coach; grew up in Monticello
- Ralph Good, pitcher with the Boston Doves; born in Monticello
