= WJLP =

Television station in Middletown Township, New Jersey

- Middletown Township, New Jersey; New York, New York; United States
- City: Middletown Township, New Jersey (Note: Originally licensed to Ely, Nevada; transferred to Middletown Township in 2014.)
- Channels: Digital: 3 (VHF), shared with WNWT-LD; Virtual: 33
- Branding: MeTV New Jersey–New York

Programming
- Affiliations: 33.1: MeTV; for others, see § Subchannels

Ownership
- Owner: Weigel Broadcasting; (WJLP-TV Limited Partnership)
- Sister stations: WNWT-LD, WZME

History
- Founded: September 21, 1998
- First air date: July 9, 2001
- Former call signs: KBJN (2001–2005); KVNV (2005–2014)
- Former channel numbers: Analog: 3 (VHF, 2001–2009); Virtual: 3 (2009–2015)
- Former affiliations: NBC, via KVBC (2001–2008); Independent (2008–2009); My Family TV (later became The Family Channel) (2009–2014)
- Call sign meaning: Jules L. Plangere, Jr. (chairman of previous owner PMCM TV)

Technical information
- Licensing authority: FCC
- Facility ID: 86537
- ERP: 40 kW
- HAAT: 476 m (1,562 ft)
- Transmitter coordinates: 40°42′46.8″N 74°0′47.3″W

Links
- Public license information: Public file; LMS
- Website: www.metv.com/wjlp

WJLP (channel 33) is a television station licensed to Middletown Township, New Jersey, United States, broadcasting the classic television network MeTV to the New York City area. It is owned by Weigel Broadcasting alongside Story Television outlets WZME (channel 43) and WNWT-LD (channel 37, officially a low-power station, operating under a channel sharing arrangement with WJLP). WJLP and WNWT-LD share studios in Freehold Township, New Jersey, and transmitter facilities at One World Trade Center in Lower Manhattan.

== History ==
=== Origins in Ely, Nevada (2001–2014) ===
Founded in 1998 by Harris Broadcasting, the station went on the air two and a half years later. The station was originally located in Ely, Nevada and signed on July 9, 2001, as KBJN, a satellite of KVBC (now KSNV), the NBC affiliate in Las Vegas. Harris Broadcasting soon sold it to KVBC owner Valley Broadcasting Company. The call letters were changed to KVNV on November 15, 2005.

On July 1, 2008, Valley Broadcasting filed an application with the Federal Communications Commission (FCC) to sell KVNV to PMCM TV, LLC (which owns six Jersey Shore radio stations in Monmouth and Ocean counties as Press Communications, LLC). The sale was approved on September 17, 2008, and was consummated on November 12, 2008; soon afterward, the station was relaunched as Intelliweather 3, carrying looping weather conditions and a news ticker. KVNV affiliated with My Family TV in October 2009. During 2012, the station began to expand its local programming, including a local weekend public affairs program and a locally produced children's program (to comply with the FCC's E/I regulations). KVNV also began to simulcast the noon and 6 p.m. newscasts of former sister station KRNV-DT in Reno, and added the statewide political show Nevada's Eye on Washington.

=== Move to New Jersey (2014–present) ===
Soon after its purchase of the station, PMCM TV sought to reallocate KVNV to Monmouth County, New Jersey, as part of a legal loophole that allows any VHF station that moves to a state with no FCC-licensed commercial VHF stations to receive automatic permission to move. Nearly all commercial TV stations serving New Jersey are based in New York City or Philadelphia; the only commercial VHF station in the state, Secaucus–licensed WWOR-TV, moved to UHF after the 2009 digital television transition. The FCC denied the request in a December 18, 2009, letter. The full commission denied PMCM's application for review in a memorandum opinion and order released on September 15, 2011; however, this denial was reversed by the U.S. Court of Appeals for the D.C. Circuit on December 14, 2012. KVNV applied for a construction permit to move on May 28, 2013, to Middletown Township, New Jersey (though its transmitter location would be at the Condé Nast Building in midtown Manhattan to serve the entire New York media market).

In January 2014, MeTV announced that KVNV, would become its New York City affiliate, replacing Bridgeport, Connecticut-based WZME. In its June 2014 bill, Comcast systems in central New Jersey stated that KVNV would be added to its lineup on July 31, 2014. This was delayed because of objections from WFSB in Hartford, Connecticut, who voiced concerns to the FCC about signal overlap and disruption of its Fairfield County, Connecticut, channel lineup. WFSB's owner at the time, Meredith Corporation, also suggested that the FCC assign virtual channel 33 (which is WFSB's RF channel) to KVNV instead of 3. On September 12, 2014, the FCC Media Bureau issued a public notice seeking comment on an alternative virtual channel proposal set forth by PMCM, under which KVNV would broadcast on virtual channel 3.10 to not interfere with WFSB and would seek cable carriage on channel 3 throughout the New York market, except in Fairfield County, Connecticut.

KVNV commenced test broadcasting on September 29, 2014, at approximately 2:30 p.m. on RF channel 3 (virtual channel 3–10). This test transmission consisted of an EBR test pattern with a black text field bearing text – Line 1: "KVNV TV" static, Line 2: "WJLP-TV" static. Immediately at the base of the black text box, a white rectangular square rapidly moved back-and-forth horizontally. No audio or tones accompanied the test pattern. The test broadcast ended on September 30, 2014, at approximately 2 p.m. The station made a brief return to the air on October 1, 2014, at approximately 12:30 p.m.; this transmission lasted approximately five minutes.

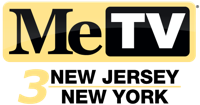
First logo used as a MeTV affiliate (2014–2015); was still used as a bug until January 2022.

On October 1, 2014, at 5:01 p.m., KVNV signed-on its transmitter with intentions to officially commence programming at 6 p.m. The 5 p.m. transmission consisted of an EBR test pattern with a black text field, this time bearing text – Line 1: "KVNV-TV" static, Line 2: "CHANNEL 3.10" static. Immediately at the base of the black text box, a white rectangular square rapidly moved back-and-forth horizontally. No audio or tones accompanied the test pattern. The intention of this 58 minute broadcast was to allow for potential viewers to re-scan their tuners in order to add channel 3 as an active channel. At 5:59 p.m., the test pattern gave way to a solid black screen.

At 6 p.m., KVNV commenced regular programming from MeTV with an episode of CHiPs. The launch consisted of no sign-on message and was basically a soft launch. The station's TVCT information during this time identified the station as KVNV-HD using virtual channel 3.10.

On October 3, 2014, the call letters were changed to WJLP.

The FCC assigned virtual channel 33 on an interim basis to WJLP on October 23, 2014; this followed an October 3 joint filing by Meredith, CBS Television Stations, and Ion Media Networks urging the FCC to take this action because CBS-owned KYW-TV and Meredith's WFSB use virtual channel 3 and Ion-owned WPXN-TV was carried on cable channel 3 on most Optimum systems in the New York market.

On November 7, 2014, following another joint complaint from Meredith, CBS and Ion, the FCC ordered that WJLP suspend operations effective at noon on November 10 unless the station remapped its virtual channel from 3.10 to 33.1. On November 10, 2014, PMCM TV filed an appeal with the D.C. Circuit of the U.S. Court of Appeals. The station asked the court for a stay until a final solution regarding the channel 3 dispute could be made. The station hoped that the court would review the appeal and make a decision on November 12, 2014. Simultaneously, WJLP also filed two petitions with the FCC.

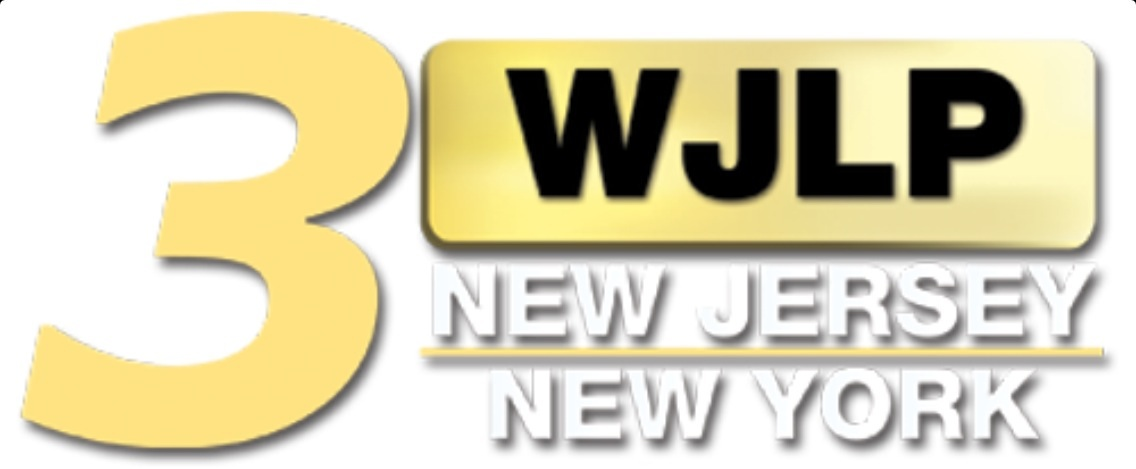
Final WJLP logo indicating virtual channel 3.10, 2015

At approximately midnight on November 11, 2014, WJLP ran a video message from Lee Leddy, Group Station Manager for PMCM TV, LLC and the owner and licensee of WJLP, that explained the situation and what he called "erroneous complaints" to the FCC by CBS, Ion, and Meredith. Channel 3 then signed off the air. WZME resumed its place as the sole MeTV outlet for the New York area.

WJLP returned to the air a day after with a bumper that explained that the station was granted an emergency stay to continue broadcasting until at least December 1, 2014. On November 25, 2014, a federal court upheld the stay and allowed WJLP to continue broadcasting on channel 3.10. On March 16, 2015, the station remapped its virtual channel from channel 3 to channel 33 on an "interim" basis following an order from the FCC.

=== Sale to Weigel Broadcasting ===
On October 11, 2021, PMCM TV announced a pending sale of WJLP and WNWT-LD to Weigel Broadcasting of Chicago for $62.5 million. The sale was completed on January 7, 2022.

== Programming ==
As of January 2022, WJLP carries the majority of the MeTV lineup, with some exceptions; Your New Jersey, hosted by Lisa Marie Falbo, is a public affairs show focused on the Garden State, and New Jersey Politics with Laura Jones which takes a look at what's happening in Trenton and local municipalities. Both shows air on Saturday and Sunday mornings.

WJLP had previously preempted several hours of the MeTV schedule each day to air infomercials.

== Technical information ==
=== Subchannels ===
Subchannels of WJLP and WNWT-LD
License	Subchannel	Res.	Short name	Programming
WJLP	33.1	720p	MeTV	MeTV
WJLP	33.2	480i	TOONS	MeTV Toons
WJLP	33.3	480i	LAFF	Laff
WJLP	33.4	480i	WEST	WEST
WJLP	33.6	480i	NEST	The Nest
WJLP	33.7	480i	STORY	Story Television (WNWT-LD)
WJLP	33.8	480i	MeTV+	MeTV+
WNWT-LD	37.1	480i	STORY	Story Television

Simulcast of subchannels of another station

In February 2015, the station added the Justice Network (now True Crime Network) on digital subchannel 33.2. This was changed to Laff in 2016. On March 20, 2016, WJLP added two standard definition subchannels to its lineup, Escape (now Ion Mystery) and Grit. These diginets are also available on many Univision-owned stations, including those in the New York City television market.

A fifth subchannel was added two months later on 33.10 which airs local maritime and weather reports. The underlying audio for this station was provided by WWZY Long Branch. WJLP later added audio subchannels to its lineup—Thunder, B985, The Boss 107.1 FM, and Great Gold 1410 AM. All of these terrestrial radio stations are owned by Press Communications, LLC, which is a sister company to PMCM TV, LLC. The radio channels were dropped in January 2022, ahead of WJLP's sale to Weigel.
