= WHTG =

WHTG may refer to:

- WHTG (AM), a radio station (1410 AM) licensed to Eatontown, New Jersey, United States
- WKMK, a radio station (106.3 FM) licensed to Eatontown, New Jersey, United States formerly known as WHTG-FM 1961 to 2010
- WBBO, a radio station (98.5 FM) licensed to Ocean Acres, New Jersey, United States formerly known as WHTG-FM briefly From September 15, 2010, to December 8, 2010
