= Hit 106 =

Hit 106, HIT-106 or Hits 106 can refer to one of the following radio stations:

- KARP-FM, licensed to Dassel, Minnesota
- WHTG-FM, licensed to Eatontown
  - WBBO Bass River Township, New Jersey (simulcast of WHTG-FM)
- WHYB, licensed to Menominee, Michigan, formerly branded as "Hits 106"
- WIOG, licensed to Bay City, Michigan
