= WHCT =

WHCT may refer to:

- WHCT-LD, a low-power television station (channel 35) licensed to serve Hartford/New Haven, Connecticut, United States
- WUVN, a television station (digital 22, virtual 18) licensed to serve Hartford, Connecticut, which held the call sign WHCT from 1955 to 2000
