= WBXI =

WBXI is a set of call letters used for the following television stations:

- WBXI-CD, Indianapolis, IN
- WBXI, a WB 100+ Station Group affiliate in Binghamton, NY, which is predecessor of WBNG-TV's .2 subchannel
