= New Country Y-107 =

Radio station simulcast around New York City (1996–2003)

New Country Y-107 was a radio station simulcast on as many as four FM stations all on 107.1 MHz around New York City. Airing a country music format, the stations targeted a primarily suburban and exurban audience. Owned by Big City Radio, New Country Y-107 broadcast from 1996 to 2002; the simulcast then flipped to contemporary Spanish music as "Rumba 107" before being broken up after it was sold in 2003. The station was based at the headquarters of Big City Radio in Hawthorne, New York, moving to Manhattan in 2001.

== Stations ==
New Country Y-107 debuted on three stations, later expanded to four in 1998.

Y-107 quadcast
| Call sign in 1998 | Frequency | City of license | Service area | Current (Note: As of June 10, 2021) call sign |
|---|---|---|---|---|
| WWYY | 107.1 FM | Belvidere, NJ | New Jersey Skylands and Pocono Mountains (Pennsylvania) | WWYY |
| WWZY | 107.1 FM | Long Branch, NJ | Jersey Shore and Staten Island | WWZY |
| WYNY (Note: Flagship station) | 107.1 FM | Briarcliff Manor, NY | Westchester/Rockland County, NY and Bergen County, NJ | WXPK |
| WWXY | 107.1 FM | Hampton Bays, NY | Eastern Long Island and the Hamptons | WLIR-FM |

'"`UNIQ--templatestyles-00000012-QINU`"'
- Grade A 60 dBu signal contours for the New Country Y-107 quadcast, c. 2001.
- '"`UNIQ--templatestyles-0000000C-QINU`"''"`UNIQ--templatestyles-00000011-QINU`"'
  - '"`UNIQ--templatestyles-0000000D-QINU`"'
    WWYY (107.1 FM) Belvidere, New Jersey
  - '"`UNIQ--templatestyles-0000000E-QINU`"'
    WWZY (107.1 FM) Long Branch, New Jersey
  - '"`UNIQ--templatestyles-0000000F-QINU`"'
    WYNY (107.1 FM) Briarcliff Manor, New York
  - '"`UNIQ--templatestyles-00000010-QINU`"'
    WWXY (107.1 FM) Hampton Bays, New York

== History ==
=== Building the quadcast ===
On December 5, 1996, two stations on 107.1 MHz recently purchased by Odyssey Communications, alternative-formatted WRGX—licensed to Briarcliff Manor, New York, and serving Westchester County—and WZVU, a rock outlet in Long Branch, New Jersey, became a simulcast of a country music format. They were joined a month later by WWHB in Hampton Bays, New York, which had simulcast WNEW-FM in New York City. The design of the network—with transmitters ringing New York City but not actually covering the urban core—was intended, as it matched the distribution of country music listeners in the area, who mostly lived in the suburbs; it had come about because the market had been without a country station for most of the last year, after the sale of what was WYNY (103.5 FM).

Six months after launching, New Country Y-107's stations received more fitting call letters: WRGX became WWXY, WZVU became WWZY, and WWHB became WWVY. In December 1997, Odyssey Communications changed its name to Big City Radio and became a publicly traded company.

The station was strongest in suburban areas. In 1998, it ranked 25th overall in the New York City metro; in the embedded market of the Jersey Shore, it ranked third. New Country Y-107 doubled the ratings of the next most listened-to station in Rockland County within a year of its debut. The return of a country music station helped increase interest in country concerts and events; in 1998, the Country Music Expo in Edison returned after skipping 1997, as it now had a way to promote itself.

In 1998, Big City Radio spent $3.65 million to purchase a fourth station on 107.1: WRNJ-FM, located in Belvidere, New Jersey, which served the Lehigh Valley to the far west. Unlike the other Y-107 stations, WRNJ had been a country station prior to its acquisition by Big City. Renamed WWYY, its addition formed a quadcast. The WYNY call letters were added to the simulcast on the Briarcliff Manor transmitter in December 1998. These call letters had been first used in New York City radio in 1977 at 97.1 MHz and had been associated with country music on 97.1 and 103.5 MHz until 1996.

=== Financial problems at Big City Radio ===
In November 1999—as the company struggled to raise its share price and its strategy of using multiple signals to cover a large market had not panned out as anticipated—Big City Radio's founder, Michael Kakoyiannis, resigned. He was replaced by Charles Fernandez of Heftel Broadcasting, a station group that primarily targeted Hispanic audiences, and the company merged with Fernandez's Hispanic Internet Holdings. The company announced plans to change its other "Y107" network, in the Los Angeles area, to a Spanish-language format, though New Country Y-107 would be left untouched. The station, however, continued to struggle, as its four transmitters did not provide the type of clear coverage that one New York City station could.

Big City's financial problems, however, continued to grow. In 2001, the company dismissed its program director and morning show host for "economic reasons". As other Big City stations changed to Spanish-language formats, speculation mounted that New Country Y-107 would be next. That October, Big City Radio moved the studio operation from Hawthorne to Manhattan.

=== From country to Rumba ===
In late April 2002, it was finally announced that New Country Y-107 would leave the format, and the station's air staff began saying their on-air goodbyes. On May 8, it made way for "Rumba 107.1" and became a Spanish-language contemporary hit radio outlet.

The format change did not improve Big City's increasingly dire financial position. In November 2002, the company retained a broker to shop the quadcast and its other properties for sale. The stations were sold in 2003 to Nassau Broadcasting Partners for $43 million. When the deal took effect, Nassau broke up the quadcast.

Nassau ended up retaining only the Lehigh Valley station, WWYY. Jarad Broadcasting acquired the Long Island station, which became WLIR-FM; WWZY in New Jersey was sold to Press Communications for $20 million; and Pamal Broadcasting leased and then bought the Westchester County station, converting it to a simulcast of its WSPK in Poughkeepsie before returning it to its own station.
