= Modern rock =

Umbrella term describing rock made from the mid-1970s to present day; radio format

Modern rock is an umbrella term used to describe rock music that is found on college and commercial rock radio stations. Some radio stations use this term to distinguish themselves from classic rock, which is based in 1960s–1980s rock music.

== Radio format ==
Modern rock (also known as alternative radio) is a rock format commonly found on commercial radio; consisting primarily of the alternative rock genre. Generally beginning with hardcore punk but referring especially to alternative rock music since the 1980s, the phrase "modern rock" is used in the US to differentiate the music from classic rock, which focuses on music recorded in the 1960s through to the early 1990s.

A few modern rock radio stations existed during the 1980s, such as KROQ-FM in Los Angeles, XETRA-FM in San Diego, WHTG-FM (now WKMK) on the Jersey Shore, WLIR on Long Island, and WFNX in Boston. Modern rock was solidified as a radio format in 1988 with Billboard's creation of the Modern Rock Tracks chart. The chart was based on weighted reports from college radio stations and commercial stations such as those listed above. Radio & Records, a US trade publication, began tracking airplay from several of these stations on their New Rock weekly track chart beginning in January 1989, calling them "radio's most successfully adventurous current-intensive stations" that would serve as "the proving ground for many of tomorrow's stars".

The 1988 episode of the VH1 show I Love the '80s discussed INXS, the Cure, Morrissey, Depeche Mode, and Erasure as modern rock artists representative of that year. In, the breakthrough success of the grunge bands Nirvana and Pearl Jam resulted in many American radio stations switching to the format. Modern rock is considered by some to be a specific genre of alternative rock.

The format has gone through two distinct periods, dividing the line from classic modern rock and the current alternative rock format used today. Up until grunge went mainstream, the format featured a wide variety of up-tempo danceable music from a diverse group of artists that were being played in rock discos and clubs. This was a legacy from new wave music and the Second British Invasion that immediately preceded it. Of all the artists who had songs hit the top 30 in the first modern rock chart, only seven of them were American. Between 1992 and 1994, most of the female, foreign and dance music had largely disappeared from the chart. While the chart still featured a variety of alternative rock music, it was largely guitar rock created by male Americans. By 1996, the modern rock chart was largely identical to the mainstream rock chart; it was therefore surveying what was then mainstream rock music.

By the 2000s, the format lost ground on commercial radio. Rolling Stone reported in March 2005 that rock radio audiences had shrunk by nearly 20 percent over at least six years, and that Y100, the last modern rock station in Philadelphia, had switched to hip-hop after WHFS in Washington, D.C., WZBT in Miami and KLOL in Houston had folded in the previous six months. Boston's WBCN announced in July 2009 that it would leave the air that August, months after New York's K-Rock switched to Top 40. The same year Billboard renamed its Modern Rock chart Alternative, to better reflect the name used within the format. Chicago's Q101 (WKQX) dropped alternative rock for all-news programming after a sale, and in 2011 WYSP in Philadelphia, WRXP in New York and WVRX in Washington, D.C. switched from rock to talk radio.

== See also ==
- Active rock - A format for new hard rock and heavy metal bands. Similar to mainstream rock, it plays some classic hard rock favorites, although the format primarily focuses on new and emerging artists.
- Alternative rock (genre)
- Campus radio
- Classic alternative - a format that plays alternative music from the 1970s through 1990s, referring to classic rock that has not been given significant recognition.
- College rock
- Indie rock
- Mainstream rock - created after the AOR format during the 1970s, which existed until the early to mid-1980s, mainstream rock has become more favorable over classic rock. It focuses on popular rock hits from the 1970s up until the mid-2000s and has little current music in its playlists. Few radio stations will play newer rock artists; unlike active rock, it functions as modern classic rock.
- Post-grunge
