= WHTG (AM) =

- Eatontown, New Jersey; United States
- Broadcast area: Monmouth–Ocean County, New Jersey
- Frequency: 1410 kHz
- Branding: The Breeze

Programming
- Language: English
- Format: Oldies
- Affiliations: Associated Press

Ownership
- Owner: Press Communications, LLC
- Sister stations: WKMK; WTHJ; WWZY; WBHX; WBBO

History
- First air date: November 1, 1957
- Call sign meaning: Harold and Theo Gade (station founders)

Technical information
- Licensing authority: FCC
- Facility ID: 72323
- Class: D
- Power: 500 watts (day); 126 watts (night)
- Transmitter coordinates: 40°16′10.4″N 74°4′17.5″W
- Translator: 100.7 W264DH (Eatontown)

Links
- Public license information: Public file; LMS
- Webcast: Listen live
- Website: breezeradio.com

WHTG (1410 kHz) is a commercial AM radio station broadcasting an oldies format. Licensed to Eatontown, New Jersey, the station serves the Monmouth and Ocean County areas. WHTG is owned by Press Communications, LLC and features programming from Associated Press. The station also broadcasts on FM translator W264DH on 100.7 FM in Eatontown.

== History ==
WHTG signed-on the air on November 1, 1957, a simulcast of its co-owned station WHTG-FM. In 1984, when the station began playing a big-band standards format, WHTG-FM began featuring alternative rock. Eventually the station gravitated toward an oldies format, called "Great Gold".

Until its purchase in 2000 by Press Communications, the station was privately owned by the Gade family, the station's founders. While the station maintains its original AM tower and transmitter site in Tinton Falls, the studios are now located in nearby Neptune.

During the 1960s, Wally Dow announced, sold time, and performed all general duties at the station. He was general manager of the station from 1968 until September 1970, when he and his family moved to Florida.

For much of its history WHTG was a daytime only radio station. The station's traditional signoff was Perry Como's recording of "The Lord's Prayer", used every day except for Yom Kippur when a different signoff was used. Relaxing of Federal Communications Commission (FCC) rules allowed the station to broadcast for two hours after local sunset and now broadcasts around the clock on 500 watts daytime and 126 watts nighttime. Once the station changes over to 126 watts the listening radius is severely diminished.

On July 28, 2022 WHTG changed its branding to "The Breeze", now positioning as "The Jersey Shore's Feel Good Station". "The Breeze" was previously used on Press stations WBHX and WWZY until 2013.

== Translator ==
Broadcast translator for WHTG
Call sign	Frequency	City of license	FID	ERP (W)	HAAT	Class	Transmitter coordinates	FCC info
W264DH	100.7 FM	Eatontown, New Jersey	156685	21	74.9 m (246 ft)	D	40°16′41.4″N 74°4′49.5″W	LMS
