= Press Communications =

American radio and television broadcast company

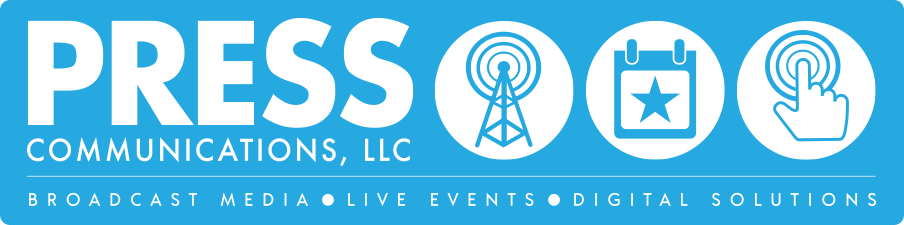
- Type: Limited Liability Company
- Industry: Broadcast television, Radio broadcasting
- Founded: 1895 (Newspapers); 1947 (Radio); 2008 (Television)
- Headquarters: Neptune Township, New Jersey
- Area served: New Jersey, neighboring areas of Pennsylvania and New York
- Owner: Robert E. McAllan (CEO)
- Subsidiaries: PMCM TV, LLC
- Website: http://www.presscommradio.com http://www.pmcmtv.com

Press Communications Radio, LLC is a broadcasting company in the American state of New Jersey which owns six radio stations. The company is owned by Robert E. McAllan, and is a sister entity to PMCM TV, LLC. It traces its roots back to 1895, and entered radio broadcasting in 1947 by launching the first FM station entirely in the Garden State, WBAB-FM in Atlantic City, New Jersey (at the time, owned by its subsidiary, Press-Union Newspapers), simulcasting WBAB, later falling silent. While no longer in the newspaper business, the company has a formal business partnership with the Gannett-owned Asbury Park Press.

== PMCM TV ==
PMCM TV, LLC was founded in 2008 in Wall Township, New Jersey to purchase KJWY from Sunbelt Communications Company and KVNV from Valley Broadcasting Company. After the sale closed in 2009, the stations were moved to Wilmington, Delaware (to serve the Philadelphia market) and Middletown Township, New Jersey (to serve the New York City market) respectively and resumed broadcasting in 2013. The Wilmington station, which PMCM renamed KJWP, was sold to Maranatha Broadcasting Company in 2017, and the Middletown Township which PMCM renamed WJLP, was sold to Weigel Broadcasting in 2022.

== Broadcasting ==
=== Radio stations ===
Press Communications, LLC
City	Call sign	Frequency	Branding	Format	Notes
Eatontown, New Jersey	WHTG	1410 kHz	The Breeze	Oldies	Purchased in November 2000
Ocean Acres, New Jersey	WBBO	98.5 MHz	B 98.5	CHR	Purchased in August 2004
Tuckerton, New Jersey	WBHX	99.7 MHz	107.1 The Boss	Classic Rock	Purchased in March 2017, simulcasts WWZY
Eatontown, New Jersey	WKMK	106.3 MHz	Thunder 106	Country music	Purchased in November 2000, simulcast on WTHJ
Bass River Township, New Jersey	WTHJ	106.5 MHz	Thunder 106	Country music	Purchased in November 2000, simulcasts WKMK
Long Branch, New Jersey	WWZY	107.1 MHz	107.1 The Boss	Classic Hits	Purchased in March 2017, simulcasts WBHX

Formerly owned stations:

Press Communications, LLC
City	Call sign	Frequency	Years owned	Current status
Atlantic City, New Jersey	WBAB	1490 kHz	1940s-1955	CBS Radio affiliate. Went dark, frequency handed to new owners in 1955, now WBSS, owned by Longport Media
Atlantic City, New Jersey	WBAB-FM	100.7 MHz	1947-1955	FM simulcast of WBAB (AM), first FM station in New Jersey. Went dark, frequency handed to new owners in 1959, now WZXL, owned by Equity Communications

=== Television stations ===
PMCM TV
City of license / Market	Station	Channel TV (RF)	Years owned	Current status
Middletown Township, NJ / New York, NY	WJLP	33 (3)	2008-2022	MeTV owned-and-operated, owned by Weigel Broadcasting
New York, NY	WNWT-LD	37 (3)	2018-2022	Local Now affiliate owned by Weigel Broadcasting
Wilmington, DE / Philadelphia, PA	KJWY/KJWP	2 (2)	2009-2017	MeTV affiliate, WDPN-TV, owned by Maranatha Broadcasting Company

== See also ==
- Me-TV
- CBS Radio
