= WNWT-LD =

Television station in New York City

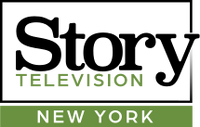
- New York, New York; United States
- Channels: Digital: 3 (VHF), shared with WJLP; Virtual: 37

Programming
- Affiliations: 37.1: Story Television

Ownership
- Owner: Weigel Broadcasting; (WJLP-TV Limited Partnership)
- Sister stations: WJLP, WZME

History
- Founded: December 8, 1989
- First air date: May 1, 1998
- Former call signs: W38CL (1998−2004); W03BM (2004); WBQM-LP (2004–2012); WBQM-LD (2012–2019)
- Former channel numbers: Analog: 38 (UHF, 1998–2004), 3 (VHF, 2004–2011); Digital: 50 (UHF, 2011–2019); Virtual: 3 (2009–2013), 51 (2013–July 2019), 6 (July 2019), 18 (late July–August 1, 2019)
- Former affiliations: The Box (1998–2001); MTV2 (2001–2006); Cornerstone Television (2006–2012); Spanish Independent (2012–2013, 2014–2019); CNN en Español (2013–2014); Local weather (2019; later on 37.2 between 2019 and 2022); NewsNet (2019−2021); Local Now (2021−2022)
- Call sign meaning: News, Weather, Talk

Technical information
- Licensing authority: FCC
- Facility ID: 22797
- Class: LD
- ERP: 40 kW
- HAAT: 476 m (1,562 ft)
- Transmitter coordinates: 40°42′46.8″N 74°0′47.3″W

Links
- Public license information: LMS

WNWT-LD (channel 37) is a television station in New York City, airing programming from Story Television. It is owned by Weigel Broadcasting alongside MeTV station WJLP (channel 33) and fellow Story Television outlet WZME (channel 43). WNWT-LD and WJLP share studios in Freehold Township, New Jersey, and transmitter facilities at One World Trade Center in Lower Manhattan. Despite WNWT-LD legally holding a low-power license, it transmits using WJLP's full-power spectrum through a channel sharing agreement. This ensures complete reception across the New York City television market.

The station has used various virtual channels since its conversion to digital television in 2012, due to the lack of allocations in the New York and Philadelphia markets, starting on channel 3 (conflicting with KYW-TV), then 51 (averting a conflict with NJ PBS station WNJN on channel 50) from late 2013 until mid-2019, then 6 and 18 (conflicting with WPVI-TV, then WUVN in Hartford, Connecticut), before finally settling on channel 37 on August 1, 2019.

== History ==
=== As W38CL, W03BM, and WBQM-LP ===
Founded in 1989 as the second over the air television station in Brooklyn, the station didn't go on the air until 1998. Originally on channel 38 as W38CL, licensed to (The) Bronx with its transmitter at Sound Shore Medical Center in New Rochelle, it was later moved to channel 3 due to a reassignment of channel 38 to WWOR-TV as its new digital companion channel and WPXU-LP in Amityville, New York. Throughout the 1990s the station ran The Box, and later MTV2 through transfer of ownership from Viacom. At that point in early 2006, it switched to Cornerstone Television. On August 17, 2007, Renard Communications Corp. (which owned almost all of New York State's The Box affiliates) announced that it would sell WBQM-LP, along with, at that time, sister station WMBQ-CA to Equity Media Holdings for $8 million. However, the transaction had a closing deadline set for June 1, 2008, and either party could cancel the sale if it were not completed by then. The sale was not consummated. As of December 8, 2008, Equity Media Holdings was in Chapter 11 bankruptcy.

=== As WBQM-LD ===
In February 2012, Renard reached another deal to sell WBQM-LD, this time to Buenavision TV Network NY, LLC (WMBQ was sold separately several months earlier).

As of February 2013, WBQM-LD affiliated with CNN en Español and transmitted CNN en Español's signal on virtual channel 3.1 and 3.4, while the local Buenavision signal was on 3.2. As of November 2013 its virtual channel changed from channel 3 to channel 51, although its real channel frequency on channel 50 did not change. CNN en Español was removed in 2014 to join WRNN-TV thus returning to a Spanish independent station.

=== As WNWT-LD ===
On December 9, 2018, BuenaVision agreed to sell WBQM-LD to PMCM TV for over $300,000. The deal, which was completed on February 19, 2019, made WBQM-LD a sister station to WJLP. On April 18, the station changed its callsign to WNWT-LD, and then on May 1, it became a primary NewsNet affiliate. In late July 2019, WNWT moved from channel 51 to channel 6 and later to channel 18 which broadcast weather reports simulcasting WJLP 33.10 before switching back to NewsNet a week later. At the same time WNWT-WX moved to its second subchannel.

On August 1, the station switched to virtual channel 37, a rare assignment in broadcasting in North America, likely to prevent adjacent-market confusion with Univision affiliate WUVN in Hartford, Connecticut, which has long held channel 18 (the channel 6 assignment was likewise also temporary due to a probable objection from ABC O&O WPVI-TV in Philadelphia). The physical channel 37 is reserved by most broadcasting authorities for the purposes of radio astronomy and medical telemetry, though a PSIP assignment of WNWT-LD's VHF physical channel otherwise causes no interference for those purposes.

=== Sale to Weigel Broadcasting ===
On October 11, 2021, PMCM TV announced a pending sale of WNWT-LD and WJLP to Weigel Broadcasting of Chicago for $62.5 million, a time when the station served as the de facto flagship affiliate of The Weather Channel's Local Now. The sale was completed on January 7, 2022. It then switched to Weigel's Story Television several months after.

== Subchannels ==
Subchannels of WJLP and WNWT-LD
| License | Subchannel | Res. | Short name | Programming |
|---|---|---|---|---|
| WJLP | 33.1 | 720p | MeTV | MeTV |
| WJLP | 33.2 | 480i | TOONS | MeTV Toons |
| WJLP | 33.3 | 480i | LAFF | Laff |
| WJLP | 33.4 | 480i | WEST | WEST |
| WJLP | 33.6 | 480i | NEST | The Nest |
| WJLP | 33.7 | 480i | STORY | Story Television (WNWT-LD) |
| WJLP | 33.8 | 480i | MeTV+ | MeTV+ |
| WNWT-LD | 37.1 | 480i | STORY | Story Television |

Simulcast of subchannels of another station
