= WHCT-LD =

Television station in Hartford–New Haven, Connecticut

- Hartford–New Haven, Connecticut; United States
- Channels: Digital: 35 (UHF); Virtual: 35
- Branding: MeTV Hartford

Programming
- Affiliations: 35.1: MeTV; for others, see § Subchannels

Ownership
- Owner: Weigel Broadcasting; (WHCT-TV LLC)

History
- Former call signs: For canceled WHCT-LP: W69CL (1991–1997, 1998–2001); W32BV (1997–1998); WHCT-LP (2001–2015)
- Former channel numbers: Analog: 38 (UHF, 2001–2020)
- Former affiliations: Jewelry Television (until 2020)
- Call sign meaning: Hartford, Connecticut (heritage calls of WUVN)

Technical information
- Licensing authority: FCC
- Facility ID: 189254
- Class: LD
- ERP: 15 kW
- HAAT: 375.8 m (1,233 ft)
- Transmitter coordinates: 41°42′13″N 72°49′55″W

Links
- Public license information: LMS
- Website: metv.com

WHCT-LD (channel 35) is a low-power television station licensed to both Hartford and New Haven, Connecticut, United States, airing programming from the classic television network MeTV. The station is owned by Weigel Broadcasting, and maintains a transmitter on Rattlesnake Mountain in Farmington.

== History ==
The WHCT call letters, which were once used on channel 18 (now Univision affiliate WUVN), were adopted by the station in August 2001. Ten years after the station signed on, from 1991 to 2001, its call letters were W69CL, with a brief change to W32BV during a failed attempt to move it to channel 32 from 1997 to 1998.

In December 2019, Weigel Broadcasting agreed to purchase WHCT-LD from Venture Technologies Group for $1.5 million. The sale was completed on September 30, 2020, and Weigel placed five of their networks on WHCT-LD immediately, replacing the Jewelry Television affiliation.

Weigel had not had an affiliate in the area for any of their networks since WZME (channel 43, mainly serving the New York market from Bridgeport) ended their affiliation with MeTV in 2015. WZME would eventually be affiliated with MeTV+ on September 27, 2021, and Story Television upon its launch on March 28, 2022.

== Subchannels ==
The station's signal is multiplexed:

Subchannels of WHCT-LD
Subchannel	Res.	Short name	Programming
35.1	720p	MeTV	MeTV
35.2	480i	HEROES	Heroes & Icons
35.3	480i	START	Start TV
35.4	480i	MOVIES	Movies!
35.5	480i	CATCHY	Catchy Comedy
35.6	480i	MeTV+	MeTV+
35.7	480i	STORY	Story Television
35.8	480i	TOONS	MeTV Toons
35.9	480i	DABL	Dabl
35.10	480i	WEST	WEST
