= Story Television =

American digital multicast TV network

- Type: Digital broadcast television network
- Country: United States
- Broadcast area: 73.23% OTA coverage and streaming
- Headquarters: Chicago, Illinois

Programming
- Language: English
- Picture format: 720p HDTV master feed, can be downscaled to 480i SDTV

Ownership
- Owner: Weigel Broadcasting
- Parent: Noah TV Limited Partnership
- Key people: Neal Sabin; (Vice Chairman, Weigel Broadcasting) Donna D’Alessandro, (executive VP of network content for Weigel Broadcasting)
- Sister channels: MeTV; MeTV+ MeTV Toons; Catchy Comedy; Movies! Start TV; Heroes & Icons; WEST; Dabl

History
- Launched: March 28, 2022; 4 years ago

Links
- Website: storytelevision.com

Availability

Terrestrial
- See List of affiliates

Streaming media
- Service(s): Frndly TV, FuboTV, Philo

Story Television is an American digital broadcast television network owned by Weigel Broadcasting that airs programming which is related to history, normally older programs which are licensed from other networks.

The formation of the network was announced on February 14, 2022. Weigel president Neal Sabin stated: “As we looked at the landscape, we looked at what genre works really well for advertisers and viewership that isn’t currently on the air right now." The genre which was chosen would be history-oriented programming. The name "Story" directly came from "history", the word that will play in the shows' taglines.

The network was launched on March 28, 2022 on stations owned by Weigel, Hearst Television, Maranatha Broadcasting Company, Marquee Broadcasting and others, along with national cable distribution through providers such as Spectrum where no affiliate exists.

== Programming ==
Each day of the week has a different theme.

- Monday: Military and Combat (briefly replaced by Modern Marvels)
- Tuesday: Tech and Innovation
- Wednesday: World Events
- Thursday: American History
- Friday: Modern Marvels (briefly replaced by Forged in Fire)
- Saturday: Unexplained Phenomena
- Sunday: Biography

The channel rebroadcasts programming that originally aired on cable networks owned by A+E Global Media such as A&E and History Channel.

== Affiliates ==
Current affiliates for Story Television
Media market	State/District	Station	Channel
Birmingham–Tuscaloosa–Anniston	Alabama	WVTM-TV	13.3
Mobile	Alabama	WFGX	35.2
Tuskegee–Montgomery	Alabama	WBMM	22.7
Kingman	Arizona	KMEE-TV	6.4
Phoenix	Arizona	KMEE-LD	40.3
Clarksville–Little Rock	Arkansas	KKME-LD	3.5
Fort Smith	Arkansas	KHBS	40.4
Harrison	Arkansas	KXMP-LD	8.5
Avalon–Los Angeles	California	KAZA-TV	54.2
Reedley–Fresno	California	KVBC-LP	13.4
Salinas–Monterey–Santa Cruz	California	KSBW	8.4
San Francisco–San Jose–Oakland	California	KTLN-TV	68.3
Sacramento–Stockton–Modesto	California	KCRA-TV	3.3
Denver	Colorado	KCNC-TV	4.6
Glenwood Springs	Colorado	KREG-TV	3.7
Hartford–New Haven	Connecticut	WHCT-LD	35.7
Bridgeport	Connecticut	WZME	43.1
Washington	District of Columbia	WDME-CD	48.2
Jacksonville	Florida	WJKF-CD	9.2
Miami–Fort Lauderdale	Florida	WBFS-TV	33.5
Orlando	Florida	WESH	2.3
Panama City	Florida	WPFN-CD	22.3
St. Petersburg–Tampa	Florida	WTOG-TV	44.7
Tequesta–West Palm Beach–Boca Raton	Florida	WPBF	25.4
Toccoa/Atlanta	Georgia	WGTA	32.5
Albany	Georgia	WSWG	44.7
Macon	Georgia	WPGA-LD	50.2
Savannah	Georgia	WJCL	22.3
Boise	Idaho	KRID-LD	22.2
Twin Falls	Idaho	KYTL-LD	17.4
Champaign	Illinois	WXSL-LD	14.2
Chicago	Illinois	WCIU-TV	26.5
Rockford	Illinois	WFBN-LD	35.3
Evansville	Indiana	WZDS-LD	5.5
Indianapolis	Indiana	WBXI-CD	47.3
South Bend	Indiana	WCWW-LD	25.5
Des Moines	Iowa	KCCI	8.4
Mason City	Iowa	KIMT	3.5
Lexington	Kentucky	WLJC-TV	65.2
Louisville	Kentucky	WLKY	32.4
Alexandria	Louisiana	KBCA	41.5
Lafayette	Louisiana	KLWB	50.6
New Orleans	Louisiana	WDSU	6.4
Portland	Maine	WPXT	51.4
Baltimore	Maryland	WBAL-TV	11.3
Boston	Massachusetts	WCVB-TV	5.3
Detroit	Michigan	WWJ-TV	62.5
Kalamazoo	Michigan	WJGP-LD	26.4
Lansing	Michigan	WLMN-LD	29.4
Muskegon–Grand Rapids	Michigan	WTLF	54.4
Traverse City	Michigan	W16DN-D	16.3
Minneapolis–Saint Paul	Minnesota	KMSP-TV	9.8
Jackson	Mississippi	WAPT	16.3
Kansas City	Missouri	KMBC-TV	9.3
St. Louis	Missouri	KNLC	24.8
St. Louis	Missouri	WXSL-LD	14.2
Springfield	Missouri	KRFT-LD	8.6
Omaha	Nebraska	KETV	7.3
Las Vegas	Nevada	KPVM-LD	25.6
Albuquerque	New Mexico	KOAT-TV	7.5
New York City	New York	WNWT-LD	37.1
New York City	New York	WJLP	33.7
Rochester	New York	WAWW-LD	20.2
Springville–Buffalo	New York	WBBZ-TV	67.3
Syracuse	New York	WHSU-CD	51.2
Winston-Salem–Greensboro–High Point	North Carolina	WXII-TV	12.3
Cincinnati	Ohio	WLWT	5.4
Cleveland	Ohio	WOCV-CD	35.2
Columbus	Ohio	WCBZ-CD	22.7
Dayton	Ohio	WZCD-LD	30.4
Oklahoma City	Oklahoma	KOCO-TV	5.4
Tulsa	Oklahoma	KUTU-CD	25.6
Astoria	Oregon	KPWT-LD	3.6
Lancaster–Harrisburg–York–Lebanon	Pennsylvania	WGAL	8.4
Johnstown	Pennsylvania	WTOO-CD	50.5
Philadelphia	Pennsylvania	WDPN-TV	2.7
Pittsburgh	Pennsylvania	WTAE-TV	4.3
Scranton	Pennsylvania	WRLD-LD	30.6
Columbia	South Carolina	WOLO-TV	25.7
Greenville–Spartanburg–Anderson	South Carolina	WYFF	4.4
Myrtle Beach	South Carolina	WFXB	43.8
Chattanooga	Tennessee	WDNN-CD	49.5
Crossville–Knoxville	Tennessee	WBXX-TV	20.2
Lebanon–Nashville	Tennessee	WJFB	44.7
Memphis	Tennessee	WNBA-LD	2.5
Dallas–Fort Worth	Texas	KAZD	55.5
Houston	Texas	KYAZ	51.4
Cedar City–St. George	Utah	KCSG	8.6
Ogden–Salt Lake City	Utah	KCSG-LD	8.6
Burlington	Vermont	WPTZ	5.2
Ashland–Richmond–Petersburg	Virginia	WUPV	65.4
Yorktown–Norfolk	Virginia	WYSJ-CD	8.1
Bellingham	Washington	KVOS-TV	12.7
Seattle–Tacoma	Washington	KFFV	44.6
Green Bay	Wisconsin	WMEI	31.3
Milwaukee	Wisconsin	WISN-TV	12.4
