= WWZY =

Simulcast with WBHX (99.7 FM) Tuckerton
- Long Branch, New Jersey; United States
- Broadcast area: Monmouth County, New Jersey
- Frequency: 107.1 MHz
- Branding: 107.1 The Boss

Programming
- Format: Classic hits

Ownership
- Owner: Press Communications, LLC
- Sister stations: WBBO; WBHX; WHTG; WKMK; WTHJ

History
- First air date: June 1, 1960
- Former call signs: WRLB (1960–1980); WWUU (1980–1982); WMJY (1982–1989); WZVU (1989–1997)
- Call sign meaning: Onetime member of the regional New Country Y-107 quadcast

Technical information
- Licensing authority: FCC
- Facility ID: 32983
- Class: A
- ERP: 5,000 watts
- HAAT: 110 meters (360 ft)
- Transmitter coordinates: 40.304722°N 73.985556°W
- Repeater: 99.7 WBHX (Tuckerton)

Links
- Public license information: Public file; LMS
- Webcast: Listen live
- Website: www.1071theboss.com

WWZY ("107.1 The Boss") is a classic hits–formatted radio station licensed to Long Branch, New Jersey, and serving Monmouth County, New Jersey. It is owned by Press Communications, and simulcast on co-owned 99.7 WBHX in Tuckerton, New Jersey. Its studios and offices are on West Bangs Avenue in Neptune City, New Jersey.

WWZY is a Class A station, with an effective radiated power (ERP) of 5,000 watts. Its transmitter is located on Broadway at Memorial Parkway in Long Branch.

== History ==
=== 1960–1981 ===
WWZY first went on the air on June 1, 1960, as WRLB "Radio Long Branch". At the time, the station's owner was afforded the possibility of broadcasting with 50,000 watts, but he declined, thinking that FM radio had limited potential. Therefore, the station signed on with 3,000 watts from a tower located in Long Branch, New Jersey. The studios were located adjacent to the tower. WWZY still uses the tower site, although the studios are now in Neptune City. When the Long Branch 107.1 did not use 50,000 watts, the Federal Communications Commission subsequently assigned 107.1 to several more communities around New York City. One was Briarcliff Manor, New York, another was Belvidere, New Jersey, and a third was Hampton Bays, New York. Having four stations near each other, all broadcasting on 107.1 MHz, caused interference for some listeners.

Throughout the 1960s and 1970s, WRLB was a full-service radio station, broadcasting big-band music, high school sports and local news.

In 1968, WRLB revamped its programming continuing with adult middle of the road music from 6 a.m. until midnight when it switched to rock and top40 music.

=== 1981-1996 ===
In 1981, WRLB was sold to Monmouth Broadcasting and became contemporary hit radio, WWUU (known on-air as "U 107"). The station was sold again to Jonathan and Elizabeth Hoffman (under the similar name "Mammoth Broadcasting"), and in 1982 became WMJY (Y-107), featuring live local talent playing the hits.

At first, Y-107 maintained U 107's CHR format. Within a few years, Y-107 was an album rock station, using the slogan "Rock Hits Home", the format gradually shifted to classic rock.

In late 1988, Mammoth sold WMJY to K&K Broadcasting.

In May 1989, WMJY changed to a local, soft adult contemporary format called "SeaView 107 FM". The call letters changed to WZVU in June 1989 to reflect the SeaView name.

WZVU's corporate parent, K&K Broadcasting began to encounter financial problems. In 1992, all of the local DJs were terminated, and the station switched to a satellite-delivered oldies format. In early 1994, the station became "Oldies 107.1".

=== 1996–2003 ===
In mid–1996 the station was sold to Big City Radio. On December 5, 1996, the station became part of the Big City Radio trimulcast (and eventual quadcast) with other 107.1 stations, WRGX in Briarcliff Manor, New York, and WWHB in Hampton Bays, New York. WZVU and the other two multicast stations switched formats to country music, known as "New Country Y-107". Call letters of the Long Branch station were changed to WWZY. Later, WRNJ-FM in Belvidere, New Jersey, was added to make Y-107 a four-station "quadcast".

On May 7, 2002, the "Y-107" quadcast ended the country format, and after a day of stunting with construction sounds, the quadcast flipped to a tropical music format as "Rumba 107". The format was ill-suited to the quadcast suburban signals, so the WWZY transmitter was moved to a tower in the Belford section of Middletown Township, in an attempt to improve its coverage of New York City. At the end of the year, Big City Radio filed for bankruptcy and sold the quadcast to Nassau Broadcasting, which broke up the quadcast and sold the individual stations. WWZY was then acquired by Press Communications LLC, moved back to the Long Branch tower, became The Breeze on June 30, 2003, and started simulcasting on WBHX in Tuckerton, New Jersey.

=== 2003–2013 ===
From 2003 to 2013, the station aired an adult contemporary format, and was branded "The Breeze". The station was simulcast on 99.7 WBHX in Tuckerton from June 30, 2003, to November 1, 2015. The WBHX transmitter is located on Long Beach Island in the town of Beach Haven, New Jersey. The station is also played throughout most of the day in southern Ocean County on WCAT-TV, the public-access television cable TV channel serving Pinelands Regional High School.

=== 2013–present ===
WWZY kept the Breeze branding until the fall of 2013 when it changed to 107.1 FM "A Music Radio Station". On July 1, 2014, 107.1 and 99.7 rebranded as Fun 107.1, shifting to a hot AC format. "107.1 FM" ended the WBHX simulcast on November 1, 2015.

On March 1, 2017, WWZY began teasing a "Big Announcement" on air and on its Facebook page, which would occur the following Friday, March 3, at 5 pm. It also revived the simulcast on WBHX, giving the format almost full market coverage over Monmouth and Ocean County. The only mention of 99.7 is at the top-of-the-hour station ID. The first song on The Boss was "We Will Rock You" by Queen. On March 3, 2017, the station again began simulcasting on 99.7 WBHX.
