= CBS Television Stations =

Local station division of CBS

- Formerly: Viacom Television Stations Group (2000–2006); CBS News and Stations (2021–2026)
- Type: Division
- Predecessors: Midwest Communications; Paramount Stations Group; Westinghouse Broadcasting
- Founded: 1941; 85 years ago (as CBS's owned-and-operated stations division); May 24, 2000; 26 years ago (current incarnation)
- Headquarters: New York City, United States
- Revenue: $1.6 billion (2014)
- Owner: Skydance
- Parent: Skydance TV

CBS Television Stations (a/k/a CBS Stations) is a division of the Skydance TV unit of Skydance Corporation that owns and operates a group of American television stations. As of January 2021, the division owned 28 stations: 15 are the core stations of the CBS television network (Including those in locations such as New York, Los Angeles, Chicago, Detroit, Dallas, San Francisco, Baltimore, Boston, Miami, Philadelphia, Atlanta, among others), two are affiliates of The CW, ten are independent stations, and one is a primary-channel affiliate of the digital subchannel network Start TV, located in Indianapolis. As of January 2018, it maintained a half-interest in Start TV, which was co-owned with Weigel Broadcasting.

CBS began its television operations on July 1, 1941, with its initial owned-and-operated station, WCBS-TV (then known as WCBW) in New York City. Other owned-and-operated stations were acquired through an ownership stake or outright purchase instead of being built by the network. The Westinghouse Electric Corporation's purchase of CBS in 1995 then merged the network's owned-and-operated stations with those of Westinghouse Broadcasting (Group W). With the subsequent 2000 merger with Viacom, the CBS-owned stations were combined with Viacom's Paramount Stations Group to form the Viacom Television Stations Group. The group was then renamed CBS Television Stations in 2006, and later CBS News and Stations in 2021, before re-branding back to CBS Television Stations.

== History ==
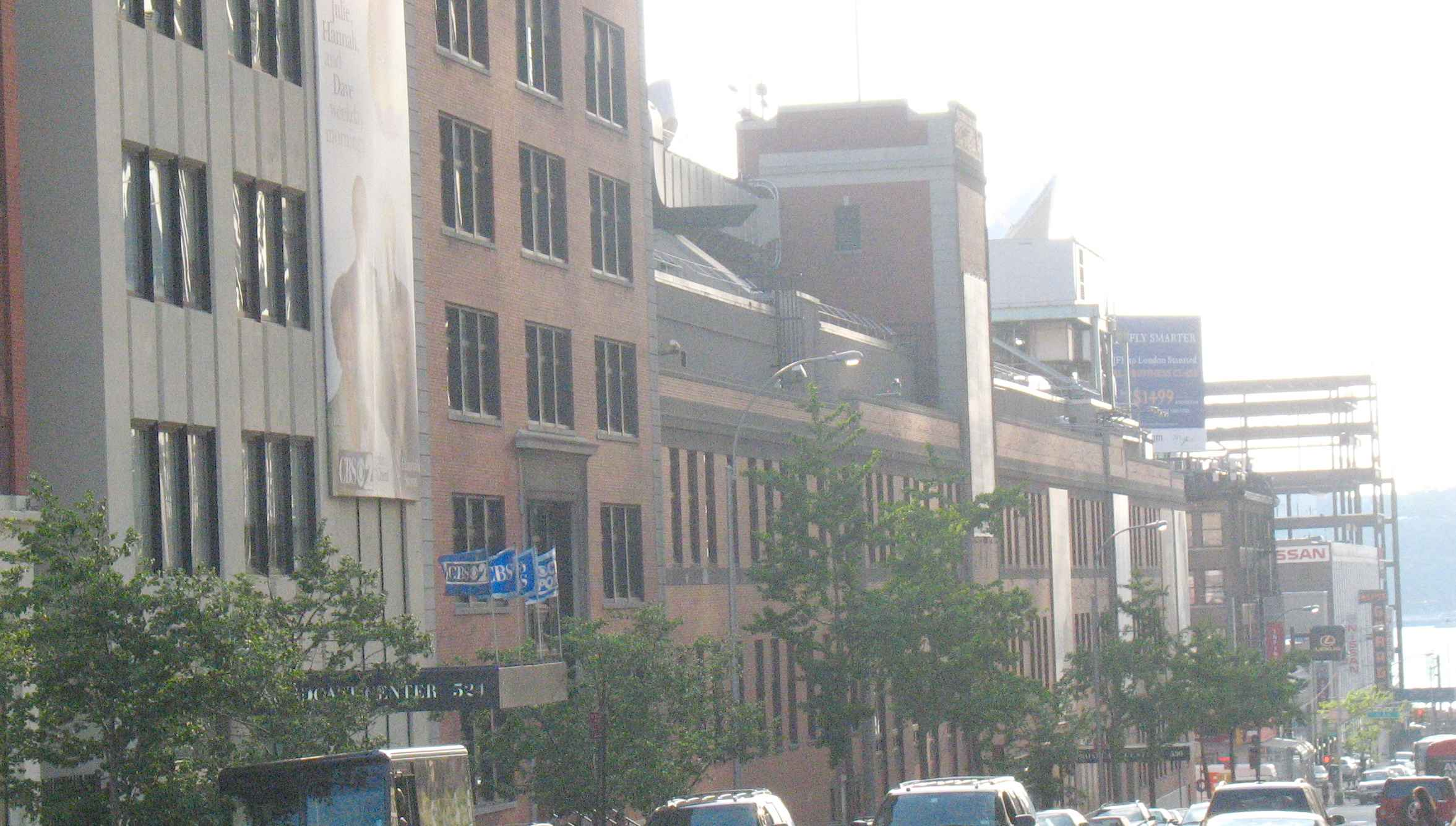
The CBS Broadcast Center in New York City, home of WCBS and WLNY

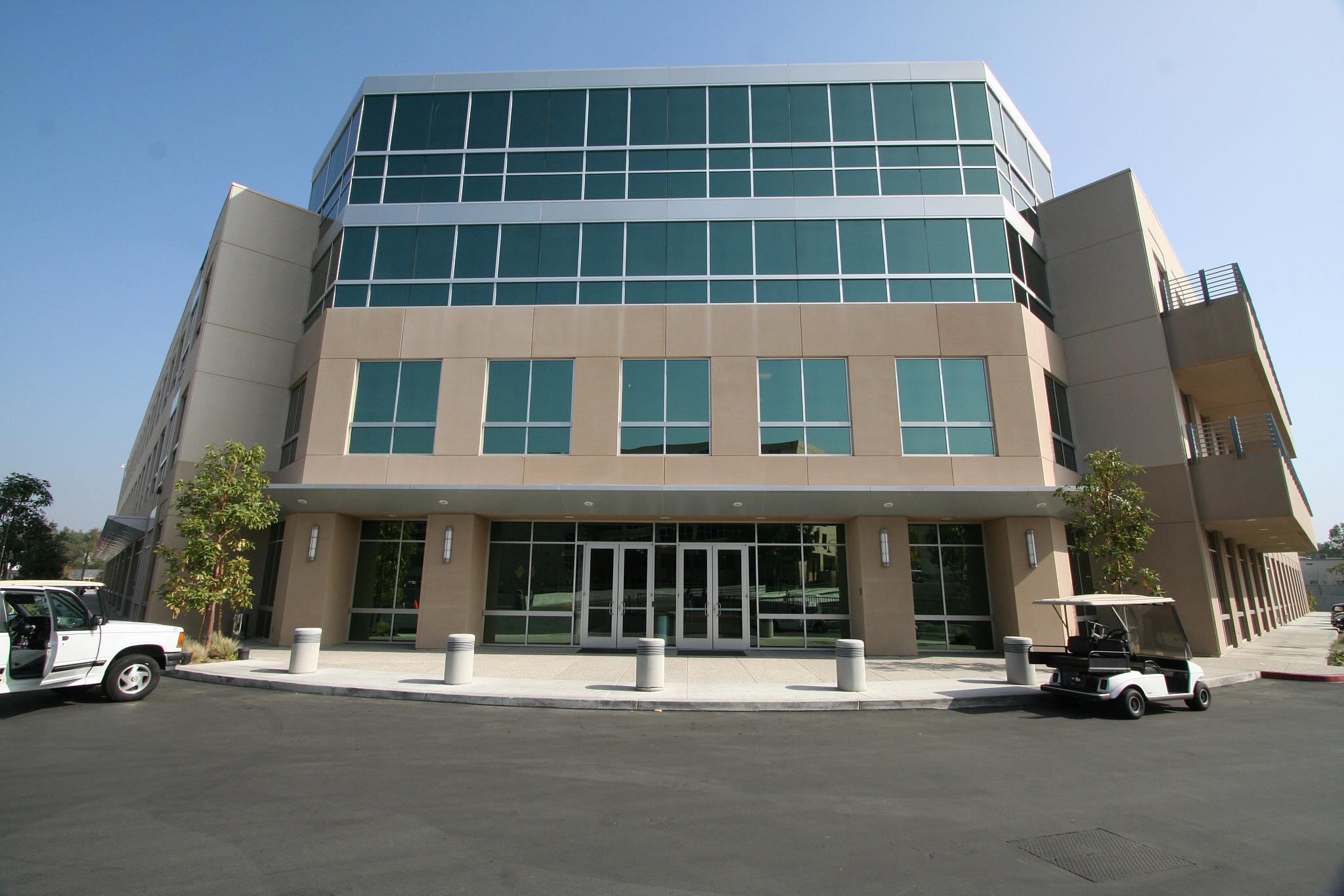
KCBS and KCAL operate at the CBS Studio Center in Los Angeles' Studio City neighborhood.

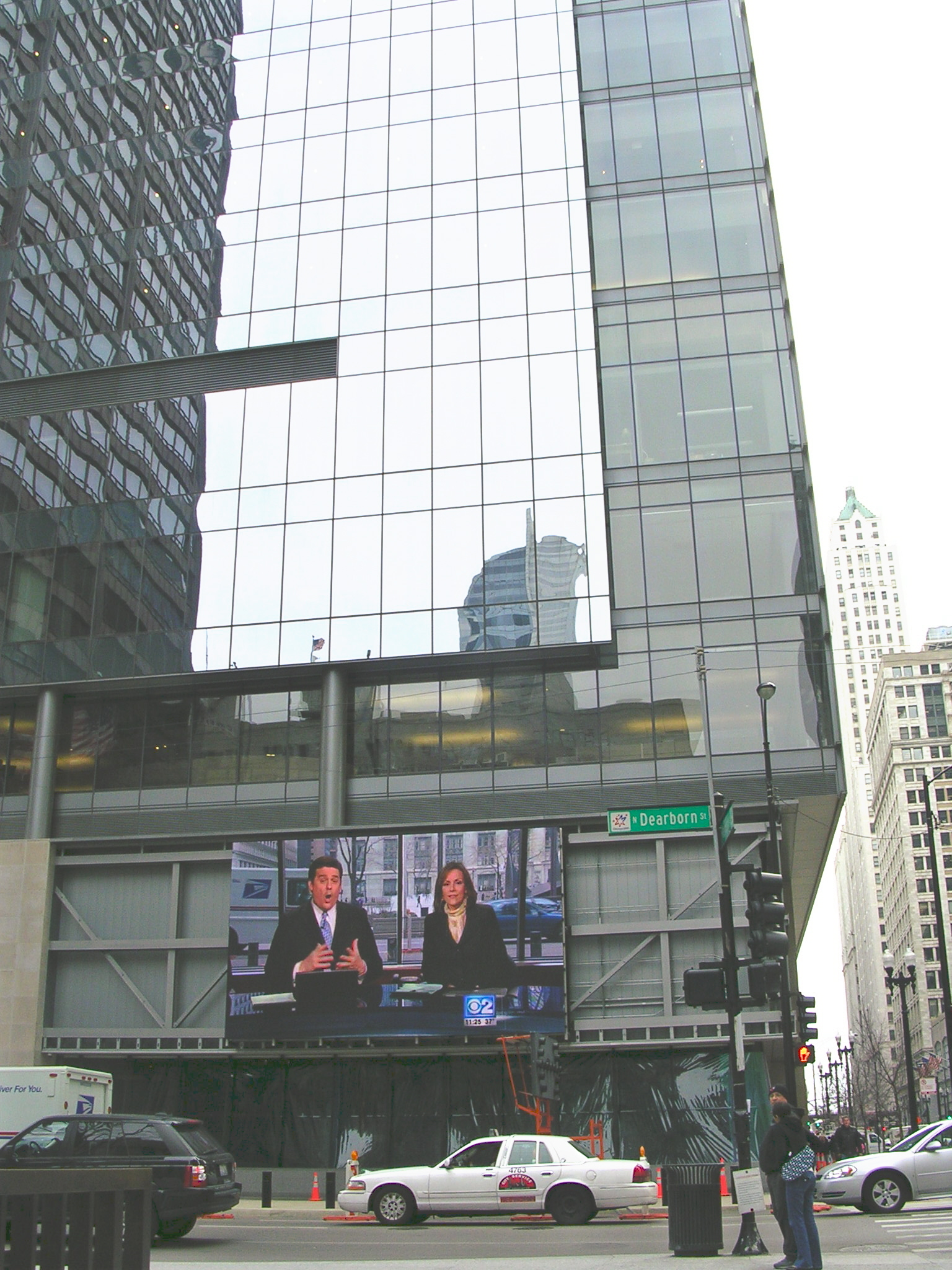
The WBBM studio building at the Block 37 development in Chicago

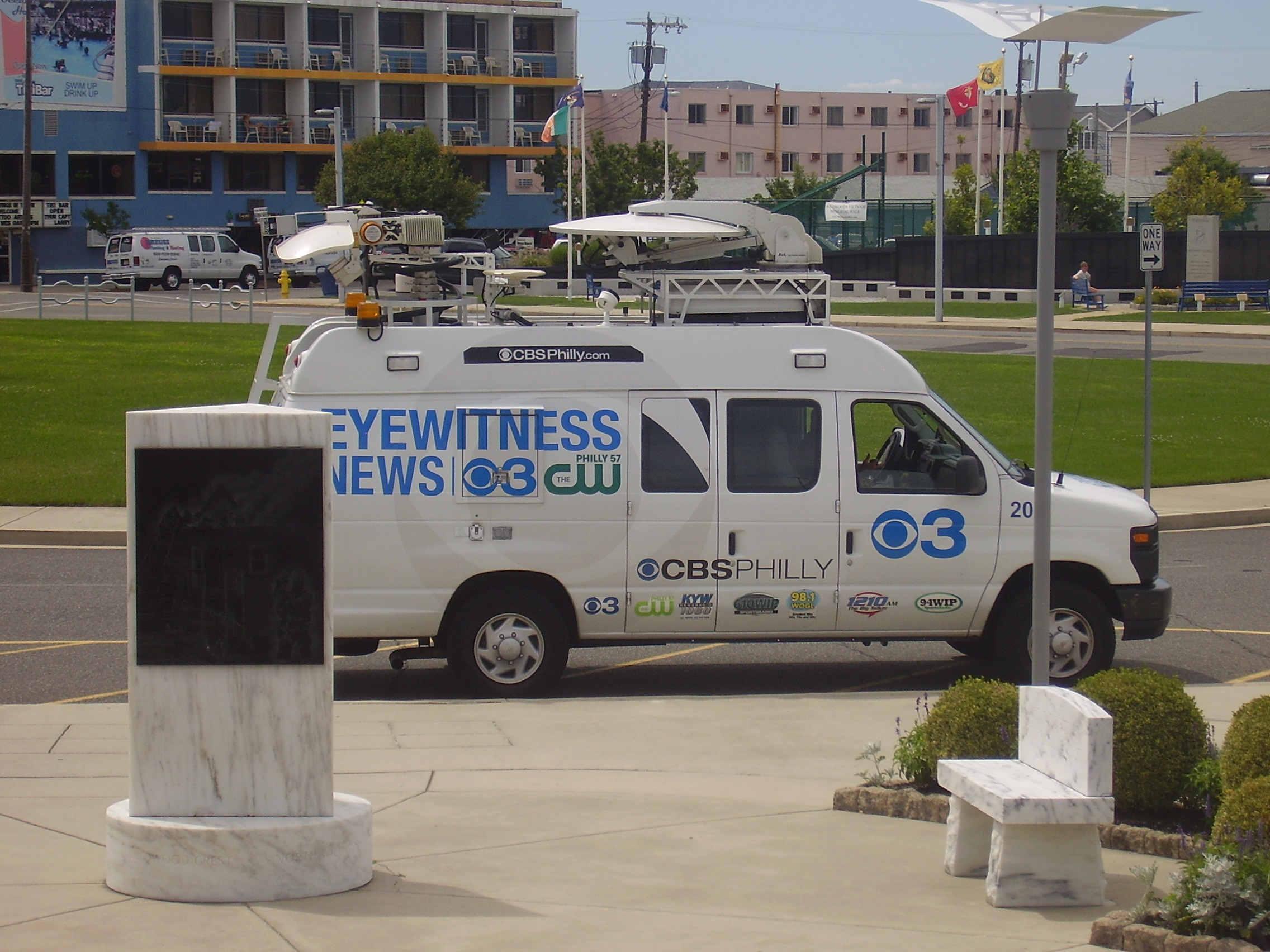
A news van for KYW/WPSG in Philadelphia, parked in The Wildwoods area

The KTVT/KTXA studio building in Dallas

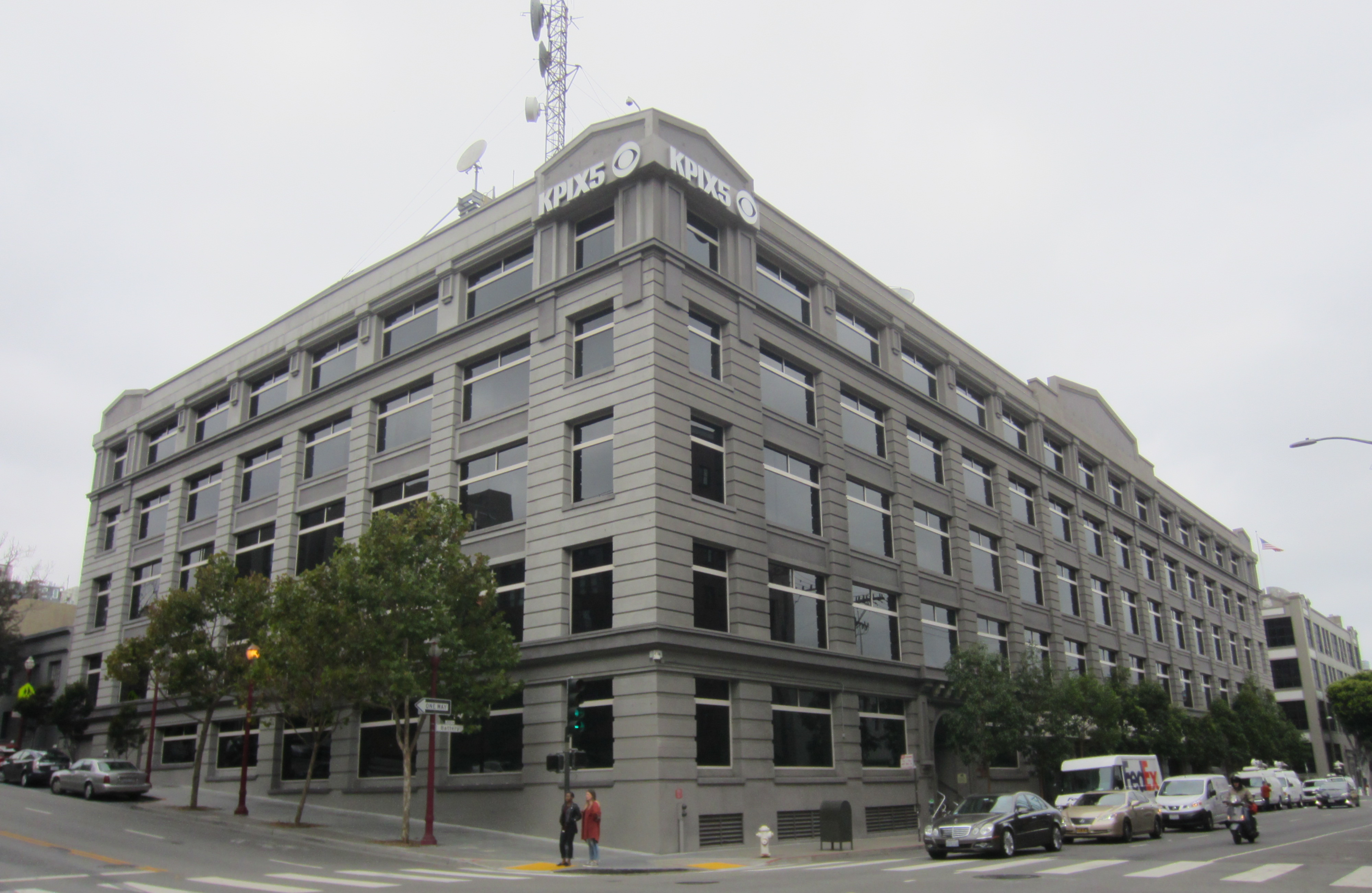
The KPIX/KPYX studio building in San Francisco

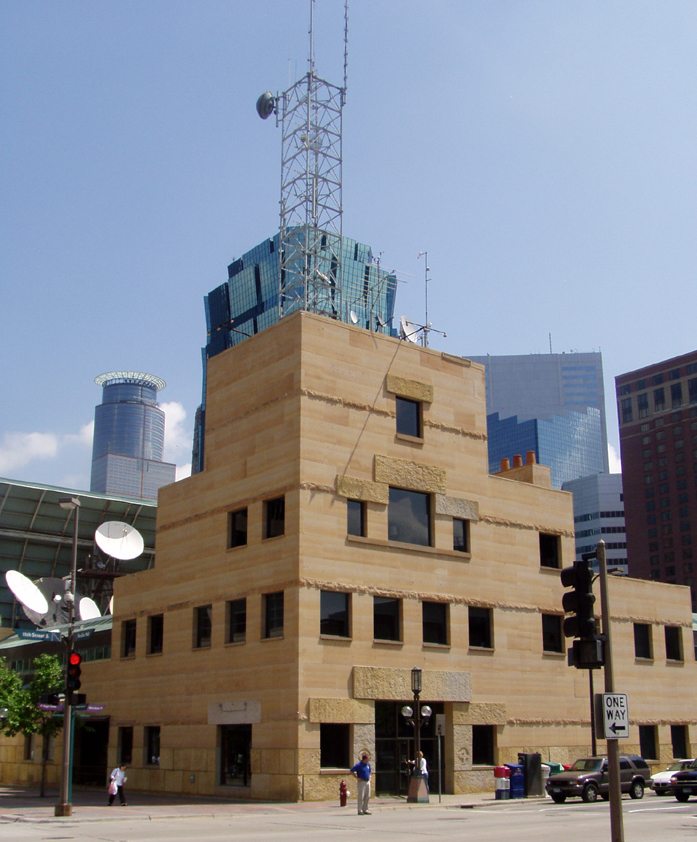
The WCCO studio building in Minneapolis

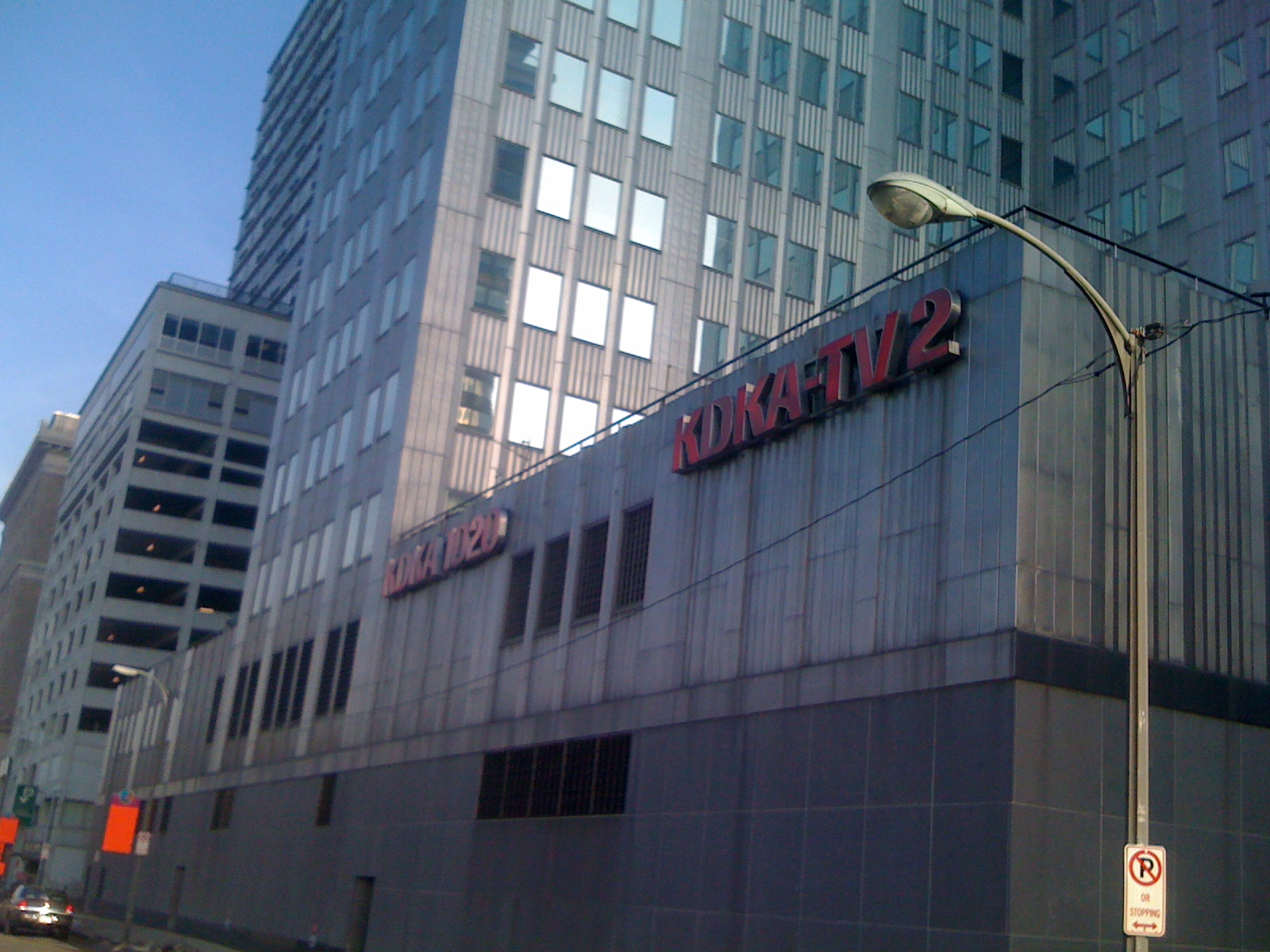
The KDKA/WPKD-TV studio building in Pittsburgh

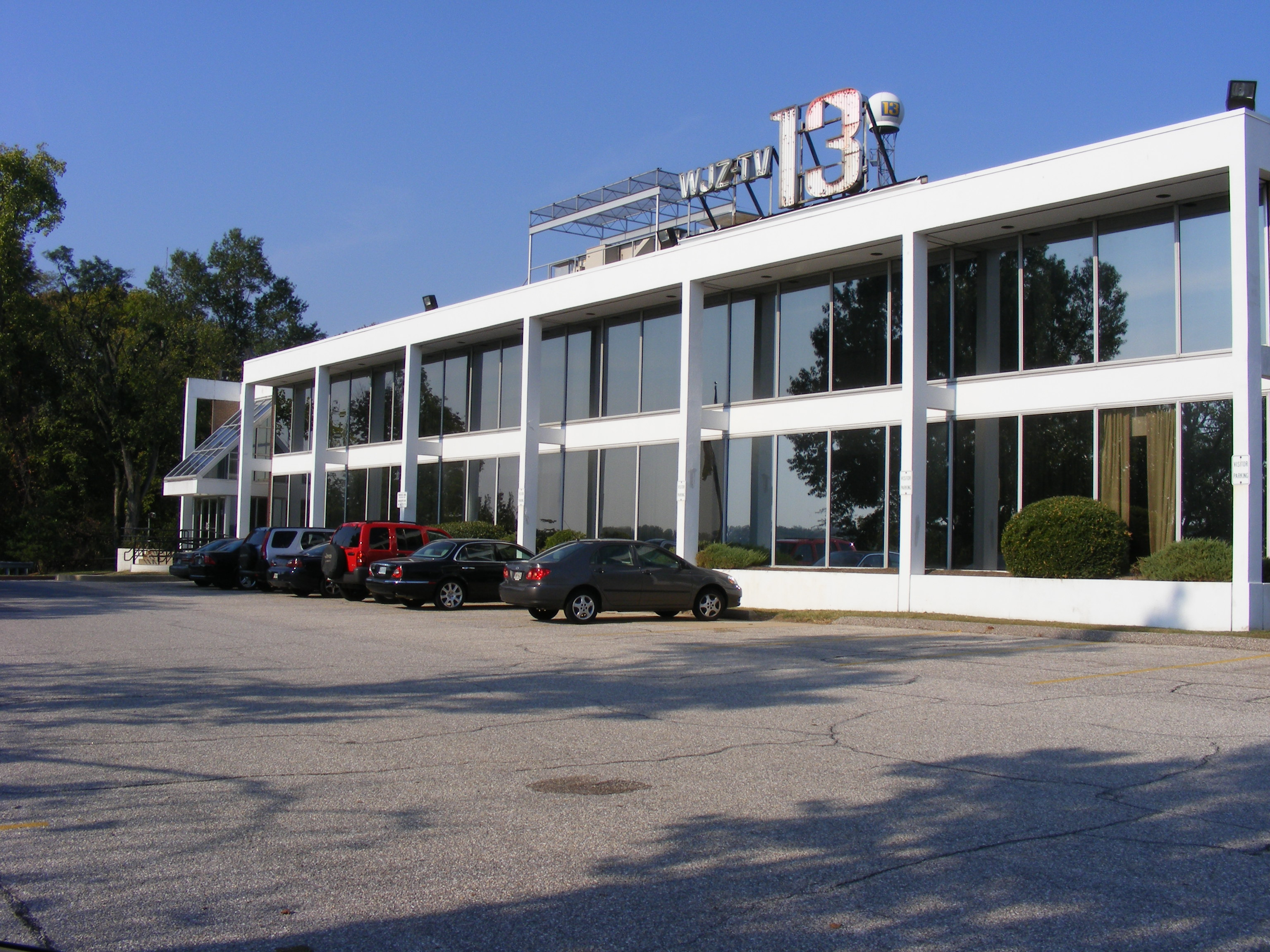
The WJZ studio building in Baltimore

=== Experimenting with New York City station and expansion (1941–1994) ===
CBS's involvement in television dates back to the opening of experimental station W2XAB in New York City on July 21, 1931. On June 24, 1941, W2XAB received a commercial construction permit and program authorization as WCBW. Later renamed WCBS-TV, it would ultimately be the only station (as of 2020) originally built and signed on by CBS. The rest of the stations would be acquired by CBS, either in an ownership stake or outright purchase.

In 1950, when rival NBC was dominant in television and black and white transmission was widespread, CBS began to buy or build their own stations (outside of New York City) in Los Angeles, Chicago, and other major cities. Up to that point, CBS programming was seen on such stations as KTTV in Los Angeles, in which CBS – as a bit of insurance and to guarantee program clearance in that market – quickly purchased a 50% interest, partnering with the Los Angeles Times. CBS then sold its interest in KTTV (now the West Coast flagship of the Fox network) and purchased outright Los Angeles pioneer station KTSL in 1950, renaming it KNXT (after CBS's existing Los Angeles radio property, KNX), later to become KCBS-TV. In 1953, CBS bought pioneer television station WBKB in Chicago, which had been signed on by former investor Paramount Pictures (and would become a sister company to CBS again decades later) as a commercial station in 1946, and changed that station's call sign to WBBM-TV, moving the CBS affiliation away from WGN-TV.

The network bought Washington, D.C. affiliate WOIC (now WUSA) in a joint venture with The Washington Post in 1950, only to sell its stake to the Post in 1954 due to tighter FCC ownership regulations. CBS would also temporarily rely on UHF technology by owning WXIX in Milwaukee (now CW affiliate WVTV) and WHCT in Hartford (now Univision affiliate WUVN), but as UHF was not viable for broadcasting at the time (due to the fact that most television sets of the time were not equipped with UHF tuners), CBS decided to sell those stations off and affiliate with VHF stations WITI and WTIC-TV (now WFSB). More long-term, CBS bought stations in Philadelphia (WCAU, now owned by NBC) and St. Louis (KMOX-TV, now KMOV), but would eventually sell these stations off as well; before buying KMOX-TV, CBS had attempted to purchase and sign on the channel 11 license in St. Louis, now KPLR-TV.

CBS did attempt to sign on a station in Pittsburgh, as it was at the time the sixth-largest market but had just one commercial VHF station in DuMont-owned WDTV, while the rest were either on UHF (the modern-day WPGH-TV and WINP-TV) or public television (WQED). Although the FCC turned down CBS's request to buy the channel 9 license in nearby Steubenville, Ohio and move it to Pittsburgh (that station, initially CBS affiliate WSTV-TV, is now NBC affiliate WTOV-TV), CBS did score a major coup when Pittsburgh-based Westinghouse Electric, a co-founder of NBC with RCA, bought WDTV from struggling DuMont and opted to affiliate the now-recalled KDKA-TV with CBS instead of NBC (like KDKA radio) due to NBC extorting and coercing Westinghouse to trade KYW radio and WPTZ (now KYW-TV) for Cleveland stations WTAM, WTAM-FM (now WMJI), and WNBK (now WKYC); the trade ended up being reversed in 1965 by order of the FCC and the Department of Justice after an eight-year investigation. Had CBS not been able to affiliate with KDKA-TV, it would have affiliated with eventual NBC affiliate WIIC-TV (now WPXI) once it signed on in 1957 instead. This coup eventually led to a much stronger relationship between Westinghouse and CBS.

CBS was a central player in a multi-year affiliation drama in Miami, Florida, in the 1980s. Long-standing affiliate WTVJ (channel 4) in Miami (along with most of the Storer Communications chain) was to have been sold to Lorimar-Telepictures in May 1986, but that deal fell apart when CBS inquired with ownership of WCIX (channel 6) about a possible purchase. WTVJ was sold to NBC in January 1987, but contractually obligated to be run as a CBS affiliate until January 1, 1989. After CBS failed to secure an affiliation with outgoing NBC affiliate WSVN, the network bought WCIX and moved all network programming there as part of a larger six-station, two-market affiliation swap. CBS's ownership of WCIX was generally regarded as a failure due to the station's signal and technical deficiencies, with then-station group president Howard Stringer telling local media in July 1989, "we can never be better than third".

CBS then acquired Midwest Communications in 1992, which owned WCCO-TV in Minneapolis and WFRV-TV in Green Bay.

=== Moving O&Os and merger with Westinghouse (1994–2000) ===
In 1994, the Fox Broadcasting Company agreed to a multi-year, multi-station affiliation deal with New World Communications, resulting in most of New World's stations switching to Fox. This set off a chain of affiliation changes across the country and other multi-station affiliation deals for the next couple of years. Unable to find a station who would agree to replace New World's WJBK-TV in Detroit, CBS struck an eleventh-hour deal to purchase UHF station WGPR (now WWJ-TV) outright. CBS also had trouble finding a station who would agree to replace New World's WAGA in Atlanta, and therefore bought UHF station WVEU (now WUPA) out of desperation, even though WVEU had the lowest ratings and the weakest signal out of Atlanta's full-power stations. However, late in November 1994, WGNX (now WANF) changed their minds and agreed to affiliate with CBS, and so CBS ended up selling WVEU to Viacom in May 1995.

The Westinghouse Electric Corporation, through its Westinghouse Broadcasting (Group W) division, sought an affiliation deal of its own, and after several months of negotiations with the other networks, Westinghouse agreed to affiliate its entire television unit with CBS. Among the Group W stations, KPIX in San Francisco and KDKA-TV in Pittsburgh were already CBS affiliates, while WJZ-TV in Baltimore and WBZ-TV in Boston switched from ABC and NBC, respectively. This affiliation pact displaced existing CBS-owned WCAU-TV; after NBC prevailed in a bidding war for the station, NBC agreed to sell to the CBS–Group W partnership KCNC-TV in Denver, KUTV in Salt Lake City, and WTVJ's license and transmitter. In turn, CBS sold to NBC both WCAU-TV and WCIX's license and transmitter. CBS retained WCIX's intellectual property, thus, when the asset swap took place on September 10, 1995, WCIX "moved" to channel 4 and was renamed WFOR-TV, operating on WTVJ's former license.

Westinghouse would then buy CBS outright, a transaction which closed in late 1995. CBS had also bought WPRI-TV in Providence, Rhode Island in early 1995 prior to the deal closing; at the time, the FCC normally did not allow common ownership of multiple stations with overlapping coverage areas, so WPRI was sold off in favor of Westinghouse's WBZ. Following the completion of the CBS takeover, the former Westinghouse Broadcasting operations took on the CBS name and identity, though the Group W name survived until the end of the 1990s as a holding company within the merged entity's structure. In 1997, Westinghouse changed its name to CBS Corporation.

When CBS/Westinghouse began purchasing several broadcasting assets from Gaylord Entertainment during the late 1990s, these transactions included the acquisition of KTVT in Dallas.

=== Merger with, split from, and reunion with Viacom (2000–present) ===
On May 24, 2000, with the merger of Viacom and CBS Corporation, Viacom's Paramount Stations Group were combined with CBS's owned-and-operated stations division to form the Viacom Television Stations Group. At the time, Viacom owned the UPN network and the Paramount Stations Group controlled UPN's owned-and-operated stations. The merger created duopolies between CBS and UPN stations in Philadelphia (KYW-TV and WPSG), Boston (WBZ-TV and WSBK-TV), Miami (WFOR and WBFS-TV), Dallas–Fort Worth (KTVT and KTXA), Detroit (WWJ-TV and WKBD-TV) and Pittsburgh (KDKA-TV and WNPA).

Viacom had also exercised a contractual clause that forced Chris-Craft Industries to either buy Viacom out of UPN, or have the former sell its ownership stake in the network to Viacom. On March 20, 2000, Chris-Craft allowed Viacom to buy out its 50% stake, giving Viacom full control of the network. However on August 12 of that year, Fox Television Stations outbid Viacom for Chris-Craft's UPN stations.

Viacom then took full control of UPN affiliates WTVX in Fort Pierce, Florida, and WLWC in New Bedford, Massachusetts, from Straightline Communications in 2001, after the Paramount Stations Group had operated the two stations through local marketing agreements since 1997.

In 2002, Viacom traded UPN stations KTXH in Houston and WDCA in Washington, D.C. to Fox in exchange for KBHK-TV (now KPYX) in San Francisco, one of the former Chris-Craft stations, resulting in the creation of a duopoly with CBS-owned KPIX. Viacom also bought independent Los Angeles station KCAL-TV in 2002, creating a duopoly with CBS-owned KCBS, which broadcasting industry observers also speculated was done to use as possible future leverage against UPN affiliate KCOP-TV, another former Chris-Craft station owned by Fox.

The former Viacom Television Stations Group logo with the current CBS eye and the 2002-2006 UPN logo.

In 2005, Viacom bought CBS-affiliate KOVR in Sacramento, resulting in another duopoly with UPN-owned-and-operated KMAX-TV. Viacom also purchased the low-powered stations WTCN-CA and WWHB-CA, integrating their local operations with WTVX.

Viacom also sold some of their stations, creating duopolies for their new owners instead. The UPN-owned-and-operated WUPL was sold to Belo Corporation, owners of CBS affiliate WWL-TV in New Orleans, after Belo turned down Viacom's offer to purchase WWL. On February 10, 2005, UPN-owned stations WNDY-TV in Indianapolis and WWHO in Columbus, Ohio, were sold to the LIN TV Corporation, owners of then-CBS Indianapolis affiliate WISH-TV. Later on November 4, 2005, The New York Times Company bought UPN-owned-and-operated station KAUT-TV to create a duopoly with NBC affiliate KFOR-TV in Oklahoma City.

Viacom Television Stations Group was then rebranded to CBS Television Stations on January 3, 2006, three days after Viacom split itself into two publicly traded companies, the second incarnations of CBS Corporation and Viacom, both of which remained controlled by National Amusements.

On January 24, 2006, CBS Corporation and Time Warner announced that it would shut down UPN and competitor The WB to launch The CW later that September. The formation of The CW to replace both UPN and The WB triggered the 2006 United States broadcast TV realignment, a chain of affiliation changes across the country and the establishment of competitor MyNetworkTV. On the day of the network launch announcement, The CW immediately announced it had reached affiliation agreements with Tribune Broadcasting (who had owned a stake in The WB) and CBS Television Stations. Tribune originally committed 16 stations that were previously affiliated with The WB, while CBS committed 11 of its UPN stations. Both companies also owned several UPN and WB-affiliated stations that did not join The CW in overlapping markets; these stations either later affiliated with MyNetworkTV or another network, or became completely independent. As part of its affiliation agreement with the network, Tribune Media agreed to divest its ownership interest in The WB (a move it made partly to avoid shouldering shutdown costs for The WB). and did not acquire an equity stake in The CW.

In 2007, CBS-owned-and-operated WFRV-TV in Green Bay and its satellite WJMN-TV in Escanaba, Michigan, were sold to Liberty Media. That same year, Cerberus Capital Management formed the holding company Four Points Media Group to serve as a buyer for seven smaller-market stations, including CBS-owned-and-operated stations KUTV in Salt Lake City and KEYE-TV in Austin, Texas; and The CW affiliates WTVX in Fort Pierce, Florida, and WLWC in New Bedford, Massachusetts. Also including were KUSG (now KMYU) in St. George, Utah, which served as satellite station of KUTV; and WTCN-CA and WWHB-CA, the sister stations to WTVX. The sale with Four Points closed on January 10, 2008.

In 2009 and 2010, three managers at its New York City station, WCBS-TV, were named CBS Television Stations executives while continuing to manage at the station. Station manager Peter Dunn was named CBS Television Stations President in November 2009. Station creative services director Bruce Erik Brauer was named in June 2010 senior vice president of creative services for the group. WCBS news director David Friend became the group's senior vice president of news in August 2010.

On June 14, 2010, Local TV, owner of CBS affiliate WTKR, acquired The CW affiliate WGNT from CBS Television Stations to create its own duopoly in the Hampton Roads area.

On December 12, 2011, CBS Television Stations announced its intent to purchase Riverhead, New York-licensed WLNY-TV (channel 55), later announced for a purchase price of $55 million, creating a duopoly with WCBS-TV. The company announced that it would add additional on-air staff and expand WLNY's local news programming (at the time, that station had only an 11 p.m. newscast). The FCC approved the sale on January 31, 2012, and CBS took control of the station on March 30. WLNY suspended its own news operations the previous day and began airing WCBS-TV produced newscasts on July 2, 2012.

On October 21, 2014, CBS and Weigel Broadcasting announced the launch of a new digital subchannel service called Decades, scheduled to launch on all CBS owned and operated stations in May 2015. The channel is co-owned by CBS and Weigel, with Weigel being responsible for distribution to stations outside CBS Television Stations. It airs programs from the extensive library of CBS Television Distribution, including archival footage from CBS News. On July 18, 2018, CBS and Weigel announced that another new subchannel service, Start TV, would launch on September 4; the new service replaced Decades on the CBS-owned stations. An additional CBS-owned subchannel service, Dabl, launched on September 9, 2019; this service, although carried on the CBS Television Stations, is run by CBS Television Distribution.

The station group made a couple of content agreements in 2014 and 2015. The stations agreed in December 2014 for its content to be shown on Curb's Taxi TV. In November 2015, the station group agreed to allow Health Media Network to air local news reports on its network in doctors' waiting rooms.

In May 2016, Adam Wiener was named as the Executive Vice President and General Manager of CBS Local Digital Media, responsible for all digital and streaming initiatives of the CBS Television Stations.

On August 1, 2018, CBS Television Stations and CBS Interactive announced plans to launch CBSN Local, a group of streaming local news channels, led by Wiener, to be distributed through the existing national CBSN service. The first of these services, CBSN New York, launched on December 13, 2018, with Los Angeles following in June 2019. Eleven other markets launched, most recently CBS News Miami in January 2022.

CBS and Viacom then merged for the second time, forming ViacomCBS (now Paramount Skydance Corporation), on December 4, 2019.

In January 2021, it was reported that Dunn and Friend had been placed on administrative leave, following allegations of racist and sexist conduct.

Former logo as CBS Television Stations (2017–2021)

Former logo as CBS News and Stations (2021–2026)

On April 15, 2021, CBS Television Stations and CBS News announced that their respective divisions would merge into a single entity. It was also announced that Neeraj Khemlani (former Executive Vice President of Hearst Newspapers) and Wendy McMahon (former President of the ABC Owned Television Stations Group) were named presidents and co-heads. This transition was completed on May 3.

On July 16, 2021, CBS named Adrienne Roark as a president for the CBS Stations, effective August 2; she primarily oversees the group's stations in the eastern United States. Two additional presidents were announced on August 13, 2021: Jennifer Mitchell, who would oversee CBS's stations in the western half of the country starting on September 7, and Tom Canedo, who immediately began overseeing the eight CBS-owned CW affiliates.

In the fall of 2022, WSBK-TV and WBFS-TV returned to independence, ending the only affiliations of MyNetworkTV carried by any Paramount station.

On May 5, 2023, CBS announced that its eight CW affiliates would drop the network and become independent in September, with the intention of expanding local programming, including live sports, as well as programming from other Paramount properties. Paramount and Warner Bros. Discovery (the latter being Time Warner's successor) sold a majority stake in The CW to Nexstar Media Group on October 3, 2022; as part of the deal, CBS was given the right to end its CW affiliations. However, WKBD-TV in Detroit would subsequently sign a deal to re-affiliate with The CW on September 1, 2024, alongside first-time affiliate WBFS-TV in Miami; both stations are in markets where the previous CW affiliate had been owned by the E. W. Scripps Company, which announced plans to drop The CW from its stations in that timeframe.

In May 2025, McMahon resigned as president of CBS News and Stations.

On November 3, 2026, Skydance announced that CBS's television station group would re-brand back to "CBS Television Stations", along with the division no longer including CBS News.

== Stations ==
Stations are arranged in alphabetical order by state and city of license.

=== Current ===
List of stations currently owned by CBS
| Media market | State | Station | Channel | Purchased | Affiliation | Notes |
|---|---|---|---|---|---|---|
| Los Angeles | California | KCBS-TV | 2 | 1951 | CBS | |
| Los Angeles | California | KCAL-TV | 9 | 2002 | Independent | |
| Sacramento–Stockton–Modesto | California | KOVR | 13 | 2005 | CBS | |
| Sacramento–Stockton–Modesto | California | KMAX-TV | 31 | 2000 | Independent | (Note: Owned by the original Viacom prior to its acquisition of CBS.) |
| San Francisco–Oakland–San Jose | California | KPIX-TV | 5 | 1995 | CBS | |
| San Francisco–Oakland–San Jose | California | KPYX | 44 | 2002 | Independent | |
| Denver | Colorado | KCNC-TV | 4 | 1995 | CBS | (Note: This station was affected by a 1995 ownership swap between CBS/Westinghouse and NBC.) |
| Miami–Fort Lauderdale | Florida | WFOR-TV | 4 | 1989 | CBS | (Note: Purchased as WCIX-TV, which broadcast on channel 6.) |
| Miami–Fort Lauderdale | Florida | WBFS-TV | 33 | 2000 | The CW | |
| St. Petersburg–Tampa | Florida | WTOG | 44 | 2000 | Independent | |
| Atlanta | Georgia | WUPA | 69 | 2000 (Note: Previously owned from 1994–1995 when it was WVEU.) | CBS | |
| Chicago | Illinois | WBBM-TV | 2 | 1953 | CBS | |
| Indianapolis | Indiana | WBXI-CD | 47 | 2001 | Start TV | (Note: Owned by the original Viacom as a result of the MTV Networks acquisition of The Box in 2001.) |
| Baltimore | Maryland | WJZ-TV | 13 | 1995 | CBS | |
| Boston | Massachusetts | WBZ-TV | 4 | 1995 | CBS | |
| Boston | Massachusetts | WSBK-TV | 38 | 2000 | Independent | |
| Detroit | Michigan | WWJ-TV | 62 | 1995 | CBS | |
| Detroit | Michigan | WKBD-TV | 50 | 2000 | The CW | |
| Minneapolis–St. Paul | Minnesota | WCCO-TV | 4 | 1992 | CBS | |
| Minneapolis–St. Paul | Minnesota | KCCW-TV | 12 | 1992 | CBS | (Note: Satellite of WCCO-TV.) |
| New York | New York | WCBS-TV | 2 | 1941 (Note: The only station that was built and signed-on by CBS.) | CBS | |
| New York | New York | WLNY-TV | 55 | 2012 | Independent | |
| Philadelphia | Pennsylvania | KYW-TV | 3 | 1995 | CBS | |
| Philadelphia | Pennsylvania | WPSG | 57 | 2000 | Independent | |
| Pittsburgh | Pennsylvania | KDKA-TV | 2 | 1995 | CBS | |
| Pittsburgh | Pennsylvania | WPKD-TV | 19 | 2000 | Independent | |
| Dallas–Fort Worth | Texas | KTVT | 11 | 1999 | CBS | |
| Dallas–Fort Worth | Texas | KTXA | 21 | 2000 | Independent | |
| Tacoma–Seattle | Washington | KSTW | 11 | 2000 | Independent | |

=== Former ===
This list also contains stations that were owned and operated by CBS prior to the 2000 merger with Viacom and the subsequent establishment of the CBS Television Stations division.

| Media market | State/Dist. | Station | Channel | Purchased | Sold | Notes |
|---|---|---|---|---|---|---|
| Los Angeles | California | KTTV | 11 | 1949 | 1951 | (Note: Co-owned with the Los Angeles Times in a joint venture; 49% owned by CBS, 51% owned by the Times.) |
| Hartford–New Haven | Connecticut | WHCT-TV | 18 | 1956 | 1958 | (Note: Known as WGTH-TV prior to 1956.) |
| Washington, D.C. | District of Columbia | WTOP-TV | 9 | 1950 | 1954 | (Note: Co-owned with The Washington Post in a joint venture; 45% owned by CBS, 55% owned by the Post.) |
| Washington, D.C. | District of Columbia | WDCA | 20 | 2000 | 2001 | |
| West Palm Beach | Florida | WTVX | 34 | 2001 | 2008 | (Note: Operated by the original Viacom through its Paramount Stations Group division from 1997 until Viacom/CBS acquired the station outright in 2001.) |
| West Palm Beach | Florida | WTCN-CD | 43 | 2005 | 2008 | |
| West Palm Beach | Florida | WWHB-CD | 48 | 2005 | 2008 | |
| Indianapolis | Indiana | WNDY-TV | 23 | 2000 | 2005 | |
| Slidell–New Orleans | Louisiana | WUPL | 54 | 2000 | 2007 | |
| Detroit | Michigan | WBXD-CA | 5 | 2001 | 2004 | (Note: Known as WBXD-LP prior to 2002 and WBXD-CA from 2002 onward.) |
| Escanaba–Marquette | Michigan | WJMN-TV | 3 | 1992 | 2007 | (Note: Satellite of WFRV-TV.) |
| Alexandria | Minnesota | KCCO-TV | 7 | 1992 | 2017 | (Note: Ceased operations in 2017.) |
| St. Louis | Missouri | KMOX-TV | 4 | 1958 | 1986 | |
| Chillicothe–Columbus | Ohio | WWHO | 53 | 2000 | 2005 | |
| Oklahoma City | Oklahoma | KAUT-TV | 43 | 2000 | 2005 | |
| Philadelphia | Pennsylvania | WCAU-TV | 10 | 1958 | 1995 | |
| Providence | Rhode Island | WPRI-TV | 12 | 1995 | 1996 | |
| Providence | Rhode Island | WLWC | 28 | 2001 | 2008 | |
| Austin | Texas | KEYE-TV | 42 | 2000 | 2007 | |
| Houston | Texas | KTXH | 20 | 2000 | 2001 | |
| Salt Lake City | Utah | KUTV | 2 | 1995 | 2008 | |
| Salt Lake City | Utah | KUSG | 12 | 1999 | 2008 | (Note: Satellite of KUTV.) |
| Portsmouth–Norfolk–Virginia Beach | Virginia | WGNT | 27 | 2000 | 2010 | |
| Green Bay | Wisconsin | WFRV-TV | 5 | 1992 | 2007 | |
| Milwaukee | Wisconsin | WXIX-TV | 18 | 1955 | 1959 | |

== See also ==
- TVX Broadcast Group
- Paramount Stations Group
- Westinghouse Broadcasting
