= WBXI-CD =

Television station in Indianapolis

- Indianapolis, Indiana; United States
- Channels: Digital: 36 (UHF); Virtual: 47
- Branding: WBXI-CD Indianapolis

Programming
- Affiliations: 47.1: Start TV; for others, see § Subchannels

Ownership
- Owner: CBS Television Stations; (CBS Mass Media Corporation)

History
- Founded: August 23, 1989
- First air date: 1990
- Former call signs: W47AZ (1990–2001); WBXI-CA (2001–2015)
- Former channel numbers: Analog: 47 (UHF, 1990–2015); Digital: 47 (UHF, 2015–2019)
- Former affiliations: The Box (1990–2001); MTV2 (2001–2004 and 2004–2007); UPN (via WNDY-TV, 2004); MTV Tres (2007–2014); Local Weather (2014–2017); Decades (2018)
- Call sign meaning: The Box Indianapolis (former affiliation)

Technical information
- Licensing authority: FCC
- Facility ID: 70416
- Class: CD
- ERP: 15 kW
- HAAT: 268.6 m (881 ft)
- Transmitter coordinates: 39°53′39.2″N 86°12′20.5″W

Links
- Public license information: Public file; LMS
- Website: wbxica.cbslocal.com

WBXI-CD (channel 47) is a low-power, Class A television station in Indianapolis, Indiana, United States, broadcasting programming from the digital multicast network Start TV. Owned by the CBS Television Stations group, the station maintains an office on North Alabama Street in downtown Indianapolis; its transmitter is located on Walnut Drive on the city's northwest side.

== History ==
The station first signed on the air in 1990 as W47AZ. Originally serving as an affiliate of the viewer-request music video network The Box, the station changed its call letters to WBXI-CA in 2001; that year, the station switched to MTV2 following that network's acquisition by Viacom, which acquired WBXI-CA. For a few months in 2004, channel 47 served as a repeater of then-sister station and UPN affiliate WNDY-TV (channel 23, now a MyNetworkTV affiliate); this ended when Viacom's Television Stations Group (now CBS Television Stations) subsidiary sold WNDY-TV to the LIN TV Corporation, owners of then-CBS (now CW) affiliate WISH-TV (channel 8), in February 2005.

Unexpectedly, Viacom retained ownership of WBXI-CA, before spinning it off to CBS Corporation in December of that year, following CBS' split from the former company; Viacom retained ownership of the MTV Networks; however, the station maintained its MTV2 affiliation.

In 2007, the station switched to MTV2's Spanish-language sister network MTV Tr3s. This would end in 2014 upon the expiration of its last carriage contract, when WBXI would switch to continuous weather information.

On January 1, 2018, WBXI began carrying programming from CBS/Weigel Broadcasting's Decades, with a local hour of the weather loop remaining weekdays at 7 a.m., which is considered as WBXI's lone "local" program. On September 3, 2018, WBXI-CD launched CBS/Weigel's new network Start TV, dropping Decades. Decades shifted over to the second subchannel of WSDI-LD.

== Technical information ==
=== Subchannels ===
The station's signal is multiplexed:

Subchannels of WBXI-CD
Subchannel	Res.	Short name	Programming
47.1	720p	StartTV	Start TV
47.2	480i	Catchy	Catchy Comedy
47.3	480i	Story	Story Television
47.4	480i	Movies!	Movies!
47.5	720p	TCT	Total Christian Television

=== Analog-to-digital conversion ===
WBXI-CA maintained a construction permit to shut down its analog signal and flash cut its digital signal into operation on UHF channel 47 on September 1, 2015. The station turned on its digital signal on August 21, 2015, and ceased operations of its analog signal on September 1, 2015, the mandatory date for Class A stations to cease operations.
