= WZME =

Television station in Bridgeport, Connecticut

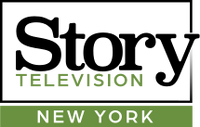

- Bridgeport, Connecticut; New York, New York; United States
- City: Bridgeport, Connecticut
- Channels: Digital: 21 (UHF), shared with WEDW; Virtual: 43
- Branding: Story Television New York; MeTV+ New York (43.2)

Programming
- Affiliations: 43.1: Story Television; for others, see § Subchannels

Ownership
- Owner: Weigel Broadcasting; (WZME-TV LLC)
- Sister stations: WJLP, WNWT-LD

History
- Founded: October 20, 1980
- First air date: September 28, 1987
- Former call signs: WBCT-TV (1987–1988); WHAI-TV (1988–1998); WIPX (1998); WBPT (1998–1999); WSAH (1999–2012)
- Former channel numbers: Analog: 43 (UHF, 1987–2008); Digital: 42 (UHF, 2006–2017); 49 (UHF, 2017–2019)
- Former affiliations: Independent (1987–1999); Shop at Home (1999–2007); Gems TV (2007–2009); RTV (2009–2012); MeTV (2012–2015); Heroes & Icons (2015–2016); SonLife (2017–2019); Shop LC (January–November 2020); ShopHQ (November 2020–2021); MeTV Plus (2021−2022, now on 43.2)
- Call sign meaning: Memorable Entertainment (backronymed initialism of MeTV; instituted before Weigel ownership)

Technical information
- Licensing authority: FCC
- Facility ID: 70493
- ERP: DTS1: 200 kW; DTS2: 210 kW
- HAAT: DTS1: 219 m (719 ft); DTS2: 428 m (1,404 ft)
- Transmitter coordinates: DTS1: 41°16′44.3″N 73°11′6.4″W; DTS2: 40°44′54″N 73°59′9″W

Links
- Public license information: Public file; LMS

WZME (channel 43) is a television station licensed to Bridgeport, Connecticut, United States, serving as the New York City market's outlet for the diginet Story Television. It is owned and operated by network parent Weigel Broadcasting alongside Middletown Township, New Jersey–licensed MeTV station WJLP (channel 33), and New York–licensed WNWT-LD (channel 37, officially a low-power station, operating under a channel sharing arrangement with WJLP). WZME's official primary transmitter is located on Booth Hill Road in Trumbull, Connecticut, with its officially secondary, but de facto, main transmitter located at the Empire State Building in midtown Manhattan.

== Prior use of channel 43 ==
Channel 43 was activated first by Bridgeport radio station WICC as WICC-TV on March 29, 1953. It was affiliated with ABC and DuMont and provided local service to the Bridgeport area. In seven years of operation, the station struggled to compete with the receivable VHF stations in New York and Connecticut. As an early ultra high frequency (UHF) station, most viewers needed converters or new sets to receive it. Though the station continued to air ABC programming into 1960, it had no viewership and largely operated as an investment on the off chance a VHF allocation would become available. After manager Kenneth Cooper suspected that nobody was watching, he ran a contest during prime time: the first caller to the station would receive a $100 bill. The contest was announced 20 times. There were no calls. In December 1959, the station put out a news release declaring itself both the "poorest television station in the U.S." and the "only station in the U.S. without any viewers". That September, to avoid competition from the VHF stations, WICC-TV shifted to a daytime operating schedule. In its first month on the air, it did not sell a single commercial. The station left the air by year's end. An attempt to reactivate it as WFTT with a format consisting of printed news information and background music was abandoned after the Federal Communications Commission (FCC) ruled that audio and video programming had to be related. As a result, Cooper put the station on the market in September 1968. Even though the facility was ready to be activated, with no investors expressing interest, Cooper surrendered the permit, which the FCC canceled on July 20, 1971.

== History ==
=== As a home shopping station (1987–2009) ===
A group of women, under the name of Bridgeways Communications Corporation, received a construction permit for a new station on channel 43 on November 20, 1980, and on September 28, 1987, the station signed on as WBCT-TV, airing home shopping programming. Initially, the station planned to become a locally focused independent station, with WBCT's management concerned that Bridgeport was being served only by New York City stations; a year later, however, the station had changed its plans and planned to implement cultural programming aimed at the Jewish community in the New York City market as a whole. Shortly afterward, the station changed its call letters to WHAI-TV, in reference to chai, the Hebrew word for living. However, the station was sold in 1994 to ValueVision, which in turn sold WHAI to Paxson Communications in 1996. By then, the station had also added infomercials to the schedule.

Original plans called for the station to become a charter station of the Pax TV network (as WIPX) when it launched in August 1998, but those plans were scrapped (mainly due to duopoly concerns resulting from Paxson's acquisition of WPXN-TV channel 31, as both stations' signals overlap and are considered part of the New York City market; at that time the FCC did not allow common ownership of such stations) and the call letters were again changed, this time to WBPT. After an attempt to sell the station to Cuchifritos Communications (which planned to make the station the flagship of a Spanish-language home-shopping service) fell through, the station was sold in 1999 to the Shop at Home Network which switched the station to the network and changed its call letters to WSAH.

Azteca América nearly bought the station late in 2000 to serve as its New York City affiliate. The deal quickly collapsed, with Azteca América citing concerns over WSAH's coverage of the market; the network ultimately affiliated with WNYN-LP. The station continued to run Shop at Home, with a brief interruption in 2006 when the network temporarily closed.

On September 26, 2006, the E. W. Scripps Company (the then-owner of the former Shop at Home owned-and-operated stations) announced that it was selling WSAH along with four other stations (KCNS in San Francisco; WMFP in Boston; WOAC (now WRLM) in Canton, Ohio; and WRAY-TV in Raleigh, North Carolina) to Multicultural Television for $170 million. Multicultural assumed control of KCNS, WOAC and WRAY on December 20, 2006, and flipped their programming to an all-infomercial format; it did not take control of WSAH and WMFP immediately due to the stations' pending license renewal. The licenses were renewed in early April 2007, and on April 24, 2007, Multicultural took control of these stations.

In May 2007, WSAH changed shopping networks, switching from Shop at Home to Gems TV, a shopping network that specialized in jewelry. In addition, infomercials once again became a part of the schedule. The Gems TV affiliation was discontinued in 2009.

=== Switch to entertainment programming (2009–2016) ===
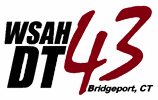
WSAH's logo before joining MeTV.

On July 1, 2009, WSAH affiliated with the Retro Television Network (RTV), becoming one of only a few affiliates to carry RTV on its main channel. Initially, RTV programming was seen from 6 p.m. to midnight, with infomercials continuing during the remainder of the broadcast day. In September 2009, WSAH cut RTV programming back to end at 11 p.m. on weekdays, and 10 p.m. on weekends. Shortly afterwards, the station announced that it would drop RTV completely at the end of the month. The next month, WSAH added a subchannel, airing Chinese-language programming from sister station KCNS. On June 6, 2011, the station rejoined RTV, running its programming from 12 p.m. to 12 a.m.

After Multicultural ran into financial problems and defaulted on its loans, WSAH was placed into a trust; the station was then placed for sale. On October 6, 2011, it was announced that WSAH would be auctioned off in bankruptcy court by the end of 2011. In the auction, held on November 15, the station was acquired by NRJ TV, LLC, which had earlier acquired KCNS and WMFP; the deal was subject to bankruptcy court approval, though the auction was challenged by Arthur Liu, who owned Multicultural and was associated with failed bidder NYVV. The FCC approved the sale on March 20, 2012, and it was consummated eight days later.

In December 2011, MeTV announced on its website that it signed WSAH as its New York City affiliate. On January 4, 2012, WSAH switched from Retro Television Network to MeTV on its primary channel, carrying MeTV's programming from 2 a.m. to 6 a.m. and 9 a.m. to 12:30 a.m. on weekdays and 11 a.m. to 12:30 a.m. on weekends. Infomercials ran in the hours that MeTV programming was not shown (making it the largest MeTV affiliate not to carry the network's complete schedule, particularly unusual given the size of the New York City market, and since most MeTV affiliates that preempt programming are in mid-sized and small markets and are alternately affiliated with major broadcast networks). RTV moved to WSAH's second subchannel, replacing the Chinese-language programming. On July 29, 2012, the station's call letters became WZME to reflect its affiliation with MeTV.

On January 24, 2014, MeTV announced that it would move its New York City affiliation from WZME to KVNV (which relaunched as WJLP channel 3) when that station completed its move from Ely, Nevada, to Middletown Township, New Jersey, in the fall of 2014. At that time, WZME remained the New York–Connecticut MeTV affiliate. With the New York area overlap with WJLP, WZME made the decision to change its network affiliation. As of October 11, 2015, WZME became the affiliate in the New York-Connecticut area of Heroes and Icons, which is also broadcast on WWOR-DT4.

=== As a religious station (2017–2019) ===
On January 1, 2017, WZME became an affiliate of the Sonlife Broadcasting Network, run by Jimmy Swaggart Ministries.

=== Return to home shopping station (2020–2021) ===
On January 1, 2020, WZME switched affiliations to Shop LC (formerly the Liquidation Channel), a home shopping network for the first time in 11 years. Sonlife was shifted to the station's second digital subchannel. In November, the station switched affiliations again to ShopHQ.

=== Sale to Weigel Broadcasting; switch to MeTV Plus (2021–present) ===
On September 1, 2021, WZME was sold to Weigel Broadcasting. MeTV programming returned to the station via Weigel's MeTV+ on September 27, 2021.

On April 1, 2022, MeTV+ on 43.1 was replaced with Story Television and MeTV+'s programming moved to a new 43.2 subchannel.

== Technical information ==
=== Subchannels ===
Subchannels of WEDW and WZME
License	Subchannel	Res.	Short name	Programming
WEDW	49.1	480i	WEDW-1	PBS
WZME	43.1	720p	Story	Story Television
WZME	43.2	480i	MeTV+	MeTV+
WZME	43.3	480i	MeTV	MeTV
WZME	43.4	720p	TOONS	MeTV Toons
WZME	43.12	480i	EMLW	OnTV4U

=== Analog-to-digital conversion ===
WZME (as WSAH) signed on its digital signal on channel 42 on December 16, 2006. The station ended regular programming on its analog signal, over UHF channel 43, on July 4, 2008. The analog signal was taken off the air, following a lightning strike at the transmitter. Since the cost of repairing the transmitter was considered to be uneconomical, due to the pending analog shutdown, the station's owners sought permission from the FCC to keep the analog transmitter silent. This did not affect WSAH's digital signal or its availability on cable. The station's digital signal remained on its pre-transition UHF channel 42, using virtual channel 43.

=== Spectrum reallocation ===
The FCC made public on April 13, 2017, that WZME had agreed to surrender its broadcast spectrum for the sum of $191,813,165. The station moved to Bridgeport-licensed public television station WEDW (owned by Connecticut Public Television) for its channel sharing arrangement. WZME previously aired The Works on 43.2 and Comet on 43.3.

== See also ==
- List of television stations in Connecticut
