= Channel 37 =

Intentionally unused television broadcasting channel

Channel 37 is an intentionally unused ultra-high frequency (UHF) television broadcasting channel by countries in most of ITU region 2 such as the United States, Canada, Mexico and Brazil. The frequency range allocated to this channel is important for radio astronomy, so all broadcasting is prohibited within a window of frequencies centered typically on 611 MHz. Similar reservations exist in portions of the Eurasian and Asian regions, although the channel numbering varies.

== History ==
Channel 37 in System M and N countries occupied a band of UHF frequencies from 608 to 614 MHz. This band is particularly important to radio astronomy because it allows observation in a region of the spectrum in between the dedicated frequency allocations near 410 MHz and 1.4 GHz. The area reserved or unused differs from nation to nation and region to region (as for example the EU and British Isles have slightly different reserved frequency areas).

One radio astronomy application in this band is for very-long-baseline interferometry.

When UHF channels were being allocated in the United States in 1952, channel 37 was assigned to 18 communities across the country. One of them, Valdosta, Georgia, featured the only construction permit ever issued for channel 37: WGOV-TV, owned by Eurith Dickenson "Dee" Rivers Jr., son of the former governor of Georgia (hence the call letters). Rivers received the CP on February 26, 1953, but WGOV-TV never made it to the air; on October 28, 1955, they requested an allocation on channel 8, but the petition was denied.

In 1963, the Federal Communications Commission (FCC) adopted a 10-year moratorium on any allocation of stations to Channel 37. A new ban on such stations took effect at the beginning of 1974, and was made permanent by a number of later FCC actions. As a result of this, and similar actions by the Canadian Radio-television and Telecommunications Commission, Channel 37 has never been used by any over-the-air television station in Canada or the United States.

The 2016–2021 repack left no North American stations above UHF 36.

The low-power WNWT-LD in New York was given virtual channel 37 in August 2019, thus becoming the first American station to be so assigned via the digital television PSIP standard. While the channel is displayed as "37.1" or "37-1" on a digital television set, WNWT-LD's physical signal remains on VHF channel 3, causing no interference.

== Allocation issues ==
Reservations and use outside the US have a non-exclusive legal status

- The Canadian Radio-television and Telecommunications Commission (CRTC) enacted such a ban on Channel 37, but radio astronomy has no exclusive status on this channel.
- Mexico observes a similar ban on the use of this TV channel, but the allocation, like Canada's, is not exclusive.
- Guatemala has a ban on Channel 37.
- The Bahamas has a similar ban to Canada's on Channel 37.
- Belize has an absolute ban on Channel 37.
- Most NTSC System-M countries have an informal ban on Channel 37 as well but give radio astronomy no exclusive use of the channel.

The 2016-2021 repack left no US, Canadian, and Mexican OTA TV broadcasters above UHF 36. Many small-market rebroadcasters were taken dark by their corporate owners. This left former UHF 38–83 in the hands of cellular telephone and land-mobile operators, with UHF 14-36 as the main OTA TV broadcast band and UHF 37 as a vacant guardband.

Since July 2000, Channel 37 may be used in the US for medical telemetry equipment on a co-primary basis. The equipment must emit no more than one watt of effective radiated power and is for use in hospitals and other such facilities.

- The power level permitted by the FCC is many times more than the amount allowed for Part 15 unlicensed broadcasting.
- In US areas set aside for radio-frequency silence, the equipment is banned by statute and regulation.
- The seemingly-low power level can be troublesome for radio astronomy equipment, which depends on detecting extraordinarily low signal strengths. Any use of the same frequencies raises the noise floor, thereby decreasing the signal-to-noise ratio and making the work more difficult.

Channel 1 was also removed from the TV bandplan in the late 1940s, channels 70 to 83 (800 MHz band) by the 1980s mainly for cellular telephone and trunked two-way land mobile radio systems and, in June 2009, channels 52 to 69 (700 MHz band) for mobile phones, emergency services and mobile TV services such as Qualcomm's now-defunct MediaFLO (channel 55). Additional channels from 38 to 51 (600 MHz band) were auctioned in early 2017, leaving channel 37 as a guard band between repacked TV stations and more mobile networks, for which T-Mobile US won most of the licenses.

Certain channels, 14 through 20, are used for land mobile communications in some large metropolitan areas in the U.S. However, facilities using this decades-old co-allocation are treated as just another station to avoid interference to in their local area.

The channels displayed by cable converter boxes under these numbers are not on the same frequencies as their over-the-air counterparts; there are also virtual channel numbering schemes in use in digital television which do not map directly to fixed frequency channel assignments. As such, a "cable 37" channel may (and most often does) exist, but on a much lower frequency.

== Outside North America ==
=== In NTSC-M countries ===
Outside North America, channel 37 is actively used in these countries where NTSC-M is used:

- In the Philippines, GMA TV-5 in Davao uses UHF 37 as GMA Network's digital channel (ISDB-T) with analog broadcasts on Channel 5. Channel 37 was also used by UNTV-37 in Metro Manila as Progressive Broadcasting Corporation's analog channel, with digital broadcasts assigned to Channel 38 (ISDB-T).
- In the Dominican Republic channel 37 is also used for the CDN news channel
- In South Korea KBS 2TV's analog channel on gwanak-san Transmission station.

=== In other countries ===
In these other countries, the frequency allocation for these TV channels is different:

- in the UK (many transmitters used by the Five network actually broadcast in the past on PAL channel 37; as mentioned below, it was previously used as a local device output channel before Five's launch, and the network had to provide service regarding re-tunes of those devices to a new channel at no cost to the viewer).
- in Western Europe, Channel 37 is used fairly widely as a relay transmitter frequency.
- In Malaysia, NTV7 broadcast in PAL on CCIR Channel 37 (599.25 MHz) prior to analogue shutdown. Currently the frequency is not in use.
- In Indonesia, Channel 37 UHF has been used by many analog terrestrial networks depending on its location, such as MNCTV for the Jakarta metropolitan area, tvOne for Medan, GTV for Semarang, TVRI for Makassar, and Metro TV for Denpasar, while in digital, the frequency now used as multiplexing by Emtek in Samarinda and MNC Group in Mamuju.
- In Qatar, Channel 37 was used by the second channel of Qatar TV.

Channel 37 is not the same frequency as it is in the countries using the System-M/N standard. At least in the UK, 606–614 MHz is reserved for radio astronomy.

The UK's namesake "Channel 37", while different in frequency, was formerly part of a small group of channels reserved for non-broadcast purposes such as RF modulators for output devices such as game consoles and videocassette recorders. The UK-named 34-37 channel range is no longer reserved in this manner.

In Japan, UHF television channel frequencies are offset by one channel compared to North American channel naming convention. Japan's channel 36 is in use by TV Asahi in some regions.

== Global UHF TV allocation table (605–615 MHz) ==
This Radio Astronomy Allocation is between the following wavelengths:

- 605 MHz = 0.49552 m = 49.55 cm
- 615 MHz = 0.48747 m = 48.75 cm
- Assume either a 100 kHz or a 250 kHz guardband with respect to this allocation.

Western Europe
Ch	DVB Video (MHz)	Audio (MHz)
36	594	596.75
37	602	604.75
38	610	612.75
39	618	620.75
40	626	628.75

Eastern Europe
Ch	DVB Video (MHz)	Audio (MHz)
35	586	589.75
36	594	597.75
37	602	605.75
38	610	613.75
39	618	621.75

China
Ch	DTMB Video (MHz)	Audio (MHz)
24	562	565.75
25	610	611.75
26	618	619.75
27	626	627.75
28	634	635.75

Australia
Ch	DVB Video (MHz)	Audio (MHz)
37	590.25	595.75
38	597.25	602.75
39	604.25	609.75
40	611.25	616.75
41	618.25	623.75

New Zealand
Ch	DVB Video (MHz)	Audio (MHz)
36	591.25	596.75
37	599.25	602.75
38	607.25	612.75
39	615.25	620.75
40	623.25	628.75

DVB-T adoption note : The tables above are not accurate for nations that have adopted DVB-T. The frequencies for audio and video are merged with DVB terrestrial television. The new DVB frequencies are rounded off to an even number in MHz as a general rule.

== National arrangements for radio astronomy different from ITU-R ==
National arrangements for radio astronomy different from ITU-R Radio Regulations

Central and Western Europe

- Austria: no allocation - only mention of No. 5.149
- Bulgaria: no allocation
- Belgium: assignment to radio astronomy (shared with active services)
- Finland: no allocation
- Estonia: no allocation
- Iceland: no allocation
- Liechtenstein: no allocation
- Luxembourg: no allocation
- Netherlands: primary status
- Portugal: no allocation
- Spain: no allocation
- Sweden: no allocation
- United Kingdom: no reference to No. 5.149

Rest of World

- Armenia: no allocation
- Russian Federation: no allocation
- Turkey: no allocation
- New Zealand, Maori TV and others (not allocated to Radio Astronomy at all)
