= WBBO =

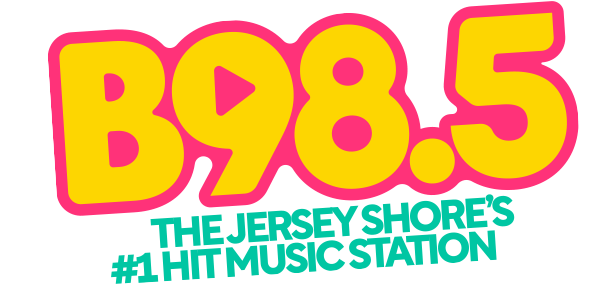
- Ocean Acres, New Jersey; United States
- Broadcast area: Ocean; Burlington
- Frequency: 98.5 MHz
- Branding: B98.5

Programming
- Format: contemporary hit radio

Ownership
- Owner: Press Communications, LLC
- Sister stations: WHTG; WKMK; WTHJ; WWZY; WBHX

History
- First air date: March 10, 1993
- Former call signs: WQNJ (1990–1997); WBBO (1997–2006); WKOE (2006); WKMK (2006–2010); WHTG-FM (2010)

Technical information
- Licensing authority: FCC
- Facility ID: 59495
- Class: A
- ERP: 3,400 watts
- HAAT: 136 meters (446 ft)
- Transmitter coordinates: 39°42′56.8″N 74°17′29.5″W

Links
- Public license information: Public file; LMS
- Website: www.b985radio.com

WBBO (98.5 FM, "B98-5") is a radio station airing a contemporary hit radio format, licensed to Ocean Acres, New Jersey, and serving Ocean and Burlington counties in New Jersey. The station is owned by Press Communications.

== Early history ==
The station first signed on the air on March 10, 1993, under the call sign WQNJ, with a simulcast of WJLK-FM. WQNJ was originally owned by Seaira, Inc, a local company that was headed by Pat Parson, a former WCBS news anchor.

It was mostly a 100% simulcast, with the exception of local commercial cut-ins and on weekday mornings at 6, 7, 8 and 9 o'clock, Pat Parson would do a 5-minute newscast. This basic format lasted until 1996 when it was announced that Nassau Broadcasting had purchased the station (and others in the Jersey Shore area).

In 2001, Nassau sold WBBO (along with WOBM-FM and WJLK) to Millennium Radio Group. In March 2002 WBBO began simulcasting on WCHR-FM 105.7; on April 15, 2002, that station changed to a classic rock format. In April 2003, it was announced that Millennium was selling WBBO to Press Communications, the original applicant for 98.5 in the late 1980s. In August 2004, Press officially took over WBBO.

== G Rock Radio ==
On February 18, 2005, WBBO started simulcasting sister station WHTG-FM "G-106.3" from Eatontown and became GRock Radio. On July 5, 2006, 98.5 changed calls to WKOE as part of a switch with new move-in 106.5 in Bass River Township. WKOE was formerly located at 106.3 in Ocean City. On July 24, 2006, at midnight, WHTG-FM's simulcast on 98.5 ceased.

== Real Jersey Kountry K98.5 ==
Later on July 24, 2006, after "stunting" with playing The Eagles "New Kid In Town" over and over for 12 hours, 98.5 debuted as "K-98.5: Real Jersey Kountry" and new call letters of WKOE, were assigned at 10 am that day (switching from WBBO which had been re-instated). The WKOE call letters were quickly replaced with WKMK to avoid a legal situation after it was noted that using WKOE on a country formatted station violated a usage agreement that Press Broadcasting signed regarding the WKOE calls.

== Thunder 98.5 ==
On February 16, 2009, "K98.5", switched its moniker to "Thunder 98.5".

== B 98.5 returns ==
The station swapped its "Thunder" country format with co-owned WHTG-FM and WBBO on September 15, 2010, at 3:00 pm. At that time, the station resumed its former identity of "B 98.5", and at that time also swapped call signals, assuming the WHTG-FM identity long associated with 106.3 FM in Eatontown, which became WKMK at that time. Some of the staff were a carry-over from Hit 106. In the weeks leading up to the station change, commercials continuously announced "Hit 106 is moving down the dial". On December 8, 2010, 98.5 returned to the WBBO call sign.
