= Ocean Acres, New Jersey =

Populated place in Ocean County, New Jersey, US

- Census-designated place
- Location of Ocean Acres in Ocean County highlighted in red (left). Inset map: Location of Ocean County in New Jersey highlighted in orange (right).

- Location in Ocean County Location in New Jersey Location in the United States
- Coordinates: 39.741788°N 74.280983°W
- Country: United States
- State: New Jersey
- County: Ocean
- Township: Barnegat / Stafford

Area
  - Total: 5.96 sq mi (15.44 km^{2})
  - Land: 5.83 sq mi (15.09 km^{2})
  - Water: 0.14 sq mi (0.35 km^{2}) 1.81%
- Elevation: 121 ft (37 m)

Population (2020)
  - Total: 18,185
  - Density: 3,121.2/sq mi (1,205.09/km^{2})
- Time zone: UTC−05:00 (Eastern (EST))
  - Summer (DST): UTC−04:00 (Eastern (EDT))
- FIPS code: 34-54315
- GNIS feature ID: 02389608

Ocean Acres is an unincorporated community and census-designated place (CDP) split between Barnegat Township and Stafford Township, in Ocean County, in the U.S. state of New Jersey. As of the 2020 census, Ocean Acres had a population of 18,185. Ocean Acres is located in the northwestern end of Stafford Township and part of Barnegat Township, and is the newest and biggest part of both communities, with approximately 5,500 lots in an area of 6 square miles (16 km^{2}).

== History ==
Ocean Acres was started in the early 1960s, on a large tract west of the Garden State Parkway sprawling between Stafford Township and Barnegat Townships. Potential buyers were bused to the site and in its first year, 2,000 lots were sold. The original Ocean Acres development offered three home designs, two ranch styles and a bi-level design. The original models were located on New Jersey Route 72, west of the present site of the Southern Ocean Medical Center, all three are currently used as businesses.

Throughout the 1970s and 1980s, growth on the community was slow. Only a handful of the streets were paved, and most homes were used as summer homes. The community offered several recreation centers, such as a lakefront park near the Nautilus Drive entrance (it was eventually leveled to make way for an expanded lake), a second lakefront park with tennis and basketball courts off of Buccaneer Lane was created. This included a bathing beach and pool, and an 18-hole golf course. The pool has since been removed, but the bathing beach is still open to swimmers after being closed for several years throughout the 1990s. This lake also serves as a popular area for fishing and kayaking. While many original recreational centers original to Ocean Acres, many new parks and recreation centers owned by Stafford Township were built since the 1990s.

For years, a state-mandated moratorium on construction west of the Garden State Parkway had limited the 5,500-lot community to fewer than 800 homes. In the 1990s, when the moratorium was lifted and sewer lines were installed; development skyrocketed. Several area developers built nearly thousands of homes in the 1990s. Large areas of vacant land in Ocean Acres were even set aside for other individual subdivisions, such as The Oaks at Stafford development. The Ocean Acres Elementary School opened to grades K-2 in 1999.

Development in the Barnegat side of the development was restricted for years due to environmental concerns, development was jump-started in the 2000s starting with the completion of Nautilus Boulevard, which was formerly a "missing link". The Walters Group became the first developer to build in the Barnegat section, an early sales promotion for the Ocean Acres Barnegat homes included a free Toyota Yaris hatchback to be included with the homes.

In 2010, the Garden State Parkway exit 67 in Barnegat was redesigned to redirect the southbound exit ramp onto the Lighthouse Drive entrance to Ocean Acres. The opening of the exit and redesign of the interchange fueled growth of the Barnegat section starting in the 2010s, with a major shopping center under construction at the intersection.

== Geography ==
According to the United States Census Bureau, the CDP had a total area of 5.956 square miles (15.43 km^{2}), including 5.848 square miles (15.15 km^{2}) of land and 0.108 square miles (0.28 km^{2}) of water (1.81%).

== Demographics ==
Historical population
Census	Pop.	Note	%±
1980	4,850		—
1990	5,587		15.2%
2000	13,155		135.5%
2010	16,142		22.7%
2020	18,185		12.7%
Population sources: 1950 1960 1970; 1980 1990 2000; 2010 2020

Ocean Acres first appeared as a census designated place in the 1980 U.S. census.

=== Racial and ethnic composition ===
Ocean Acres CDP, New Jersey – Racial and ethnic composition Note: the US Census treats Hispanic/Latino as an ethnic category. This table excludes Latinos from the racial categories and assigns them to a separate category. Hispanics/Latinos may be of any race.
Race / Ethnicity (NH = Non-Hispanic)	Pop 2000	Pop 2010	Pop 2020	% 2000	% 2010	% 2020
White alone (NH)	12,406	14,595	15,429	94.31%	90.42%	84.84%
Black or African American alone (NH)	123	197	280	0.94%	1.22%	1.54%
Native American or Alaska Native alone (NH)	14	14	7	0.11%	0.09%	0.04%
Asian alone (NH)	122	234	293	0.93%	1.45%	1.61%
Native Hawaiian or Pacific Islander alone (NH)	3	8	0	0.02%	0.05%	0.00%
Other race alone (NH)	12	17	42	0.09%	0.11%	0.23%
Mixed race or Multiracial (NH)	110	141	558	0.84%	0.87%	3.07%
Hispanic or Latino (any race)	365	936	1,576	2.77%	5.80%	8.67%
Total	13,155	16,142	18,185	100.00%	100.00%	100.00%

=== 2020 census ===
As of the 2020 census, Ocean Acres had a population of 18,185. The median age was 41.2 years. 22.3% of residents were under the age of 18 and 17.9% of residents were 65 years of age or older. For every 100 females there were 95.0 males, and for every 100 females age 18 and over there were 92.5 males age 18 and over.

100.0% of residents lived in urban areas, while 0.0% lived in rural areas.

There were 6,520 households in Ocean Acres, of which 34.3% had children under the age of 18 living in them. Of all households, 60.8% were married-couple households, 11.3% were households with a male householder and no spouse or partner present, and 21.4% were households with a female householder and no spouse or partner present. About 19.1% of all households were made up of individuals and 10.7% had someone living alone who was 65 years of age or older.

There were 6,924 housing units, of which 5.8% were vacant. The homeowner vacancy rate was 1.3% and the rental vacancy rate was 3.6%.

Racial composition as of the 2020 census
Race	Number	Percent
White	15,890	87.4%
Black or African American	310	1.7%
American Indian and Alaska Native	34	0.2%
Asian	295	1.6%
Native Hawaiian and Other Pacific Islander	0	0.0%
Some other race	393	2.2%
Two or more races	1,263	6.9%
Hispanic or Latino (of any race)	1,576	8.7%

=== 2010 census ===
The 2010 United States census counted 16,142 people, 5,561 households, and 4,371 families in the CDP. The population density was 2,760.1 people per square mile (1,065.7 people/km^{2}). There were 5,923 housing units at an average density of 1,012.8 units per square mile (391.0 units/km^{2}). The racial makeup was 94.10% (15,190) White, 1.39% (224) Black or African American, 0.12% (20) Native American, 1.45% (234) Asian, 0.05% (8) Pacific Islander, 1.60% (258) from other races, and 1.29% (208) from two or more races. Hispanic or Latino of any race were 5.80% (936) of the population.

Of the 5,561 households, 38.7% had children under the age of 18; 64.4% were married couples living together; 10.4% had a female householder with no husband present and 21.4% were non-families. Of all households, 17.5% were made up of individuals and 9.7% had someone living alone who was 65 years of age or older. The average household size was 2.90 and the average family size was 3.30.

27.2% of the population were under the age of 18, 7.3% from 18 to 24, 25.2% from 25 to 44, 26.1% from 45 to 64, and 14.1% who were 65 years of age or older. The median age was 39.2 years. For every 100 females, the population had 94.0 males. For every 100 females ages 18 and older there were 89.6 males.

=== 2000 census ===
As of the 2000 United States census there were 13,155 people, 4,683 households, and 3,807 families living in the CDP. The population density was 868.2 people/km^{2} (2,249 people/mi^{2}). There were 4,959 housing units at an average density of 327.3 units/km^{2} (848 units/mi^{2}). The racial makeup of the CDP was 96.34% White, 1.00% African American, 0.13% Native American, 0.93% Asian, 0.02% Pacific Islander, 0.54% from other races, and 1.04% from two or more races. Hispanic or Latino of any race were 2.77% of the population.

There were 4,683 households, out of which 38.7% had children under the age of 18 living with them, 69.4% were married couples living together, 8.9% had a female householder with no husband present, and 18.7% were non-families. 15.5% of all households were made up of individuals, and 8.5% had someone living alone who was 65 years of age or older. The average household size was 2.81 and the average family size was 3.12.

In the CDP the population was spread out, with 27.3% under the age of 18, 5.9% from 18 to 24, 30.8% from 25 to 44, 20.0% from 45 to 64, and 16.0% who were 65 years of age or older. The median age was 37 years. For every 100 females, there were 96.0 males. For every 100 females age 18 and over, there were 90.8 males.

The median income for a household in the CDP was $53,169, and the median income for a family was $58,404. Males had a median income of $42,368 versus $31,208 for females. The per capita income for the CDP was $21,249. About 2.4% of families and 3.5% of the population were below the poverty line, including 4.3% of those under age 18 and 4.1% of those age 65 or over.
