= WBHX =

Simulcasting WWZY 107.1 Long Branch
- Tuckerton, New Jersey; United States
- Broadcast area: Ocean County Atlantic County
- Frequency: 99.7 MHz
- Branding: 107.1 The Boss

Programming
- Format: Classic hits

Ownership
- Owner: Press Communications, LLC

History
- First air date: August 10, 1999
- Former call signs: WTUC (1992–1997, CP)

Technical information
- Licensing authority: FCC
- Facility ID: 56233
- Class: A
- ERP: 1000 watts
- HAAT: 174 meters (571 ft)
- Transmitter coordinates: 40.218143°N 74.042252°W

Links
- Public license information: Public file; LMS
- Webcast: Listen live
- Website: 1071theboss.com

WBHX (99.7 FM, "The Boss") is a commercial radio station licensed to Tuckerton, New Jersey, owned by Press Communications. The station is simulcast with co-owned WWZY in Long Branch. The two stations air a classic hits radio format known as "The Boss." WBHX's studios and offices are on West Bangs Avenue in Neptune City, New Jersey.

WBHX is a Class A station. It has an effective radiated power (ERP) of 1000 watts. The station's transmitter is on Hartley Lane in Little Egg Harbor Township.

== History ==
=== Classic rock ===
The station signed on the air on August 10, 1999. It aired a mostly automated classic rock format.

On July 22, 2002, WBHX was sold to Press Communications for $2.75 million. On October 4, 2002, the station switched to an adult contemporary format known as "The Breeze".

=== WWZY simulcast and 99.7 The Island ===
WBHX began a simulcast with WWZY (107.1 FM) on June 30, 2003. WWZY covered the northern part of the Monmouth-Ocean radio market while WBHX covered the southern end. In addition to 107.1 and 99.7, the station was also heard in parts of Ocean County on WCAT-TV, the public-access television cable TV channel based at Pinelands Regional High School.

Starting November 1, 2015, WBHX ended its simulcast with WWZY. It began playing Christmas music as "99.7 The Island". On December 26, 2015, WBHX changed its format to classic hits, still under the "99.7 The Island" branding.

On March 3, 2017, WBHX ended its classic hits format and resumed simulcasting with WWZY, by then a classic rock station branded "The Boss".

=== Attempted move to 99.3 ===
Beginning in 2010, Press Communications attempted to move WBHX inland and to 99.3 MHz. The intent was to force WZBZ, broadcasting on 99.3 from Atlantic City, to move to 99.7 in return. However, stations that are 10.6 or 10.8 MHz apart (near the typical 10.7 MHz intermediate frequency of FM receivers) must be physically separated by 10 km to avoid causing interference for listeners.

WZBZ's transmitter site is 2 km from that of WAJM (88.9 FM), and moving to 99.7 would separate the two stations by 10.8 MHz. Press' contention was that the frequency swap was possible, since WAJM's license expired in 2006 and it was legally nonexistent. The company stated WAJM did not file for renewal until after WBHX's application, four years later. The FCC's assertion was that precedent favored WAJM, as a proposed facility could not take precedence over an operating station, even if such operation was unlawful. Unusually, Press appealed the FCC's decision to the U.S. Court of Appeals for the D.C. Circuit, which upheld the decision, and later the Supreme Court of the United States, which declined to hear the case.

=== Little Egg Harbor tower ===
Verizon Communications owned the unused telephone tower and former telephone switch building in Beach Haven which WBHX leased for its transmitter equipment and tower. WBHX paid Verizon rental fees. In mid-2017, Verizon announced it would be auctioning the real estate, requiring WBHX to vacate the property and relocate to a different tower.

On December 4, 2017, WBHX began operating on a tower at the nearby Beach Haven municipal parking lot.This tower was temporary and was subject to wind and rain storms affecting its signal. In November 2018, WBHX relocated to an antenna on a former TV tower in Little Egg Harbor Township near Tuckerton. That site eventually became the present home of the WBHX transmitter. In November 2021, WBHX installed a new antenna at 178 meters (584 feet) in height above average terrain (HAAT) at the tower in Little Egg Harbor Township.
