= WKMK =

Radio station in Eatontown, New Jersey

WKMK and WTHJ

WKMK: Eatontown, New Jersey; WTHJ: Bass River Township, New Jersey; United States
- Broadcast area: Monmouth; Middlesex; Ocean; Burlington; Atlantic
- Frequencies: WKMK: 106.3 MHz; WTHJ: 106.5 MHz
- Branding: "Thunder 106"

Programming
- Format: Country music

Ownership
- Owner: Press Communications, LLC
- Sister stations: WHTG; WWZY; WBHX; WBBO

History
- First air date: WKMK: October 11, 1961; WTHJ: 1970
- Former call signs: WKMK: WHTG-FM (1961–2010); WTHJ: WSLT-FM (1970–1981); WSLT (1981–1992); WKOE (1992–2006); WBBO (2006–2010)
- Former frequencies: WKMK: 105.5 MHz (1961–1965); WTHJ: 106.3 MHz (1970–2006)
- Call sign meaning: WTHJ: Thunder Country Jersey

Technical information
- Licensing authority: FCC
- Facility ID: WKMK: 72324; WTHJ: 49984
- Class: WKMK: A; WTHJ: A
- ERP: WKMK: 1,100 watts; WTHJ: 1,450 watts
- HAAT: WKMK: 161 meters (528 ft); WTHJ: 208 meters (682 ft)
- Transmitter coordinates: WKMK: 40°16′41.4″N 74°4′49.5″W; WTHJ: 39°37′53.4″N 74°21′10.5″W

Links
- Public license information: WKMK: Public file; LMS; WTHJ: Public file; LMS
- Webcast: Listen live
- Website: thunder106.com

WKMK (106.3 FM Thunder 106) is a country music radio station, licensed to serve Eatontown, New Jersey. WKMK programming is simulcast on WTHJ (106.5 FM), licensed to serve Bass River Township, New Jersey. The stations are owned by Press Communications with studios located in Neptune, New Jersey. WKMK's transmitter is located at exit 105 of the Garden State Parkway in Tinton Falls. WTHJ's transmitter is located on the tower of Philadelphia television station WWSI, located in Tuckerton.

== History ==
=== WHTG history ===
Logo as "FM 106.3", used from 1984 to 2000

WHTG-FM first signed on at the 105.5 MHz frequency on October 11, 1961, as the sister station of WHTG (1410 AM). The station was named for Harold and Theo Gade, its first owners and operators. Until its 2000 sale, the station operated from a small house in Tinton Falls, Monmouth County. Eventually, the Gades' daughter Faye became general manager of the station, and assumed ownership of the station in 1985.

Interference with WDHA-FM in northern New Jersey resulted in the move to its current 106.3 MHz frequency in 1965, which had been vacated in 1963 when WFHA in Red Bank discontinued operations. Primarily a beautiful music station, it also broadcast adult standards and big bands in the evenings, simulcasting on its sister station until July 1984.

Under programming director Rich Robinson, the FM station adopted a format merging adult contemporary music and alternative rock, with the AM station retaining its existing format. The station's branding from this point emphasized its frequency over its call letters, becoming known as FM 106.3. WHTG-FM gained near-immediate attention for breaking artists then-unknown in the United States, spotlighting emerging local bands, such as Dramarama, along with national alternative artists such as The Bolshoi, Flesh for Lulu, Social Distortion, and Hüsker Dü. Matt Pinfield started at WHTG in December 1984, becoming programming director by the time of his 1995 departure to host MTV's 120 Minutes

=== WTHJ history ===
This facility was originally allocated to Ocean City and broadcast from that city as WSLT-FM on 106.3 MHz, beginning in 1970. The station broadcast with beautiful music, adult contemporary and classical formats until a local marketing agreement led to a country format and the new call sign of WKOE. More format changes ensued, but none of them made much of an impact on the Atlantic City market and the owners eventually applied to move the station to its present location and frequency. On July 6, 2006, WKOE swapped frequencies with WBBO, which had been simulcasting WHTG-FM on 98.5 FM and was known as B98.5 prior to that. From August 2005 to January 2009 it simulcasted G 106.3 in Ocean County and South Jersey. On January 19, 2009, the format switched to top 40 along with WHTG-FM. On December 8, 2010, the WBBO call sign reverted to the FM station on 98.5 MHz licensed to Ocean Acres, near Manahawkin. Concurrently the station on 106.5 MHz in Bass River Township, became WTHJ.

=== Ownership change ===
The WHTG cluster was sold to Press Communications in 2000. The last song played on FM 106.3 was Blink-182's "Man Overboard", before the station switched to the slightly more active rock-leaning G106.3 on November 3, 2000. It would later evolve into an alternative rock station playing current and classic hits from the genre, as well as heritage artists such as The Cure and R.E.M. The station, billed "G106.3, Your Rock Alternative", echoed FM 106.3's original alternative-era slogan from 1985 to 1989.

G 106.3 also featured special programming on weekend mornings. The Saturday Morning Breakfast Club took a nostalgic look at alternative rock from the 1980s, while Common Threads (a program that dates back to the FM 106.3 era and originally featured themed sets of songs) showcased modern acoustic music. With the acquisition of WBBO, G106.3 became known as "G-Rock Radio", with a simulcast on 106.3 and 98.5. In July 2006, WBBO's 98.5 signal was moved to 106.5. During this time, G-Rock was trimulcasted on 98.5, 106.3, and 106.5 to assist listeners in the frequency transition. G-Rock later dropped their weekday noon request show called "90's at Noon" for a more 80's influenced request show known as "The Retro Request Hour". Another specialty show heard on Sunday nights called The Underground, which featured indie bands as well as b-sides and unknown tracks from current played artists, which was dropped in March 2007. On June 24, 2007, specialty programming on Sunday nights returned with "The Punkyard with Pete Lepore", which consisted of two hours of punk music. By spring 2008, other weekend programming on G Rock included the all-request "Radio Kaos with Scott Lowe" from 7 pm – midnight Saturdays. There also was "Queens of Noise with Terrie Carr" on Sundays from 9-10 pm, which featured female-fronted bands and solo rock artists.

=== Hit 106 ===
On January 19, 2009, the previous alternative rock format heard on WHTG and WBBO was dropped in the middle of the day with no advance notice in favor of a Top 40 format, known as "Hit 106". The last song was Le Disko by Shiny Toy Guns.

A Facebook group known as Bring Back GRock! formed to protest the format change. Membership in the group peaked at over 10,700. A protest outside of Press Communications was held the week of the change, attended by about 200 people. In a letter posted in response to the protest, CEO of Press Communications Robert McAllan lambasted the G Rock Radio fans for their perceived reluctance to fill out Arbitron surveys, adding that he hoped that they would tune into the new station, which counted Justin Timberlake, 50 Cent, Pink and Fall Out Boy among its core artists.

=== Thunder 106 ===
On September 15, 2010, at 3:00 pm, Press Broadcasting's "Thunder" country format swapped formats and call signs with Hit 106, with "Thunder" now broadcasting on the renamed WKMK and WBBO-FM and the hit music format moved to the 98.5 frequency in Ocean Acres, now known as WHTG-FM.
