= Short-term Analog Flash and Emergency Readiness Act =

2009 United States law

- Long title: An act to require the Federal Communications Commission to provide for a short-term extension of the analog television broadcasting authority so that essential public safety announcements and digital television transition information may be provided for a short time during the transition to digital television broadcasting.
- Acronyms (colloquial): SAFER Act
- Enacted by: the 110th United States Congress
- Effective: December 23, 2008

Citations
- Public law: Pub. L. 110–459 (text) (PDF)
- Statutes at Large: 122 Stat. 5121

Legislative history
- Introduced in the Senate as S. 3663 by Jay Rockefeller (D‑WV) on October 1, 2008; Committee consideration by House Energy and Commerce Committee, Senate Commerce Committee; Passed the Senate on November 20, 2008 (unanimous consent); Passed the House on December 10, 2008; Signed into law by President George W. Bush on December 23, 2008

The Short-term Analog Flash and Emergency Readiness Act, or SAFER Act, (S. 3663, Pub. L. 110–459 (text) (PDF)) is a U.S. law that required the Federal Communications Commission (FCC) to allow the continuation of full-power analog TV transmissions in 2009 for an additional 30 days for the purpose of broadcasting public service announcements regarding the DTV transition in the United States and emergency information. It is also commonly known as the "DTV nightlight bill" or "analog nightlight", referring to a small nightlight that is left on after all of the other lights are out. Despite the analog shutoff deadline being extended to June 12, 2009 as part of the DTV Delay Act, stations that signed off before the deadline were still permitted to participate in the SAFER Act.

This was allowed for such broadcasts, in both English and Spanish, until July 12, 2009, while normal programming ceased the previous month. It was passed by both houses of the U.S. Congress, originating in the U.S. Senate as S. 3668, and approved by the U.S. House in mid-December 2008. Such broadcasts were not required, and for stations which changed from analog to digital broadcasts on the same frequency (known as a flash-cut) this would have been impossible. Only stations signing off early or in the "core spectrum" (channels 2 to 51) were allowed to participate so that channels 52 to 69 could be cleared from the TV broadcasting spectrum. At least one station above 51, Fox affiliate WPGH-TV in Pittsburgh (channel 53), signed off its analog signal on the original February deadline, thereby allowing it to participate in the SAFER Act.

The act was signed into law by President George W. Bush on December 23, 2008 and the FCC was given until January 15, 2009 to finalize the related rules and regulations. The initial FCC-generated list of eligible stations was published on December 29, 2008. Other stations were encouraged to apply, especially in media markets where no station was listed. Stations only required a special temporary authority (STA) from the FCC to be a part of the service.

Limited presence of advertising and sponsorship was permitted, insofar as it is needed to allow news broadcasts from the main digital station to be simulcast onto the nightlight channel during an emergency. Commercial activity was otherwise limited to mere identification of sponsors. An updated FCC list of eligible stations, released January 15, 2009, identified twenty-eight stations nationwide which have expressed interest in conducting these broadcasts. The cost per station to operate the transmitters for one month has been estimated at $3,500 to $15,000, depending on the frequency, power level, and local electric rates.

Low-power TV (LPTV) stations were not required to transition to digital broadcasting until July 13, 2021, thus the bill does not affect them. Because of this exception, several stations throughout the nation, such as Washington, D.C.'s WJLA (ABC) and WDJT-TV (CBS) in Milwaukee, took advantage of the loophole by moving network programming from their former analog full-power stations to purchased or leased LPTV stations in order to continue to provide some form of analog network programming and local news to their market area until such time as digital adoption has been deemed sufficient by the stations. WJLA ended their extended service shortly after the nightlight period, while the special dispensation by CBS for WDJT to air the network on their station ended on December 31, 2009, at which time it began to transmit MeTV station WBME-TV's main signal until Weigel's low-power analog signals in Milwaukee were turned off at the beginning of 2013.

After June 12, 2009, a low-power analog station in Chicago, not required to shut down after 30 days like other nightlight stations, aired newscasts that otherwise could not be seen by a number of people after the transition while stations attempted to solve technical and reception problems.

The FCC reported 121 stations providing nightlight service in 87 markets after the June 12, 2009 transition.

All of the stations were supposed to be off the air by July 12, 2009, and David Fiske of the FCC said no investigation was planned to ensure compliance. Fiske said someone would have to report a full-power station for violating the rule. Continuation of full-power analog broadcasting beyond this date was very unlikely, as stations had a financial incentive to shut down their analog transmitters as soon as possible, which consumed much more power than their digital replacements, and had incurred much higher costs running two transmitters for several years.

While Nielsen estimated that 1.7 million people still could not pick up a digital signal as of July 1, 2009, former acting FCC chair Michael Copps said giving nightlight stations more time was not planned.
