= Start TV =

American broadcast television network

- Type: Free-to-air television network
- Country: United States
- Broadcast area: Nationwide coverage: 84.74%
- Headquarters: Chicago, Illinois

Programming
- Language: English
- Picture format: 720p HDTV master feed, can be downscaled to 480i SDTV

Ownership
- Owner: Skydance; Weigel Broadcasting; (both owning 50%)
- Parent: CBS News and Stations; Start TV LLC
- Key people: Neal Sabin; (Vice Chairman, Weigel Broadcasting); Norman Shapiro; (President, Weigel Broadcasting)
- Sister channels: MeTV; MeTV+ MeTV Toons; Catchy Comedy; Heroes & Icons; Movies! Story Television; WEST; Dabl; See List of assets owned by Skydance Corporation

History
- Launched: September 3, 2018; 8 years ago

Links
- Website: www.starttv.com

Availability

Terrestrial
- List of affiliates

Streaming media
- Service(s): DirecTV Stream, Frndly TV, FuboTV, Philo, Sling TV, YouTube TV

Start TV is an American free-to-air television network owned as a joint venture between Weigel Broadcasting and the CBS News and Stations subsidiary of Skydance. Predominantly carried on the digital subchannels of its affiliated television station in most markets, it primarily airs classic television drama series from the 1980s through the 2010s, with a focus on women-led dramas, police and legal procedurals. The network originates from Weigel Broadcasting's headquarters on North Halsted Street in Chicago, Illinois.

== History ==
On July 18, 2018, CBS Television Stations and Weigel Broadcasting announced the formation of Start TV, with plans to launch the network on Labor Day of that year (September 3). The network initially debuted on the subchannels of five of Weigel's TV stations, three stations owned by Bahakel Communications, 17 CBS TV stations, and three CW owned-and-operated stations.

Weigel indicated that CBS suggested the idea for the network to allow more modern programming not being carried by cable networks or streaming services to find a place to air. Start TV officially launched on September 3, 2018, at 6:00 a.m. Eastern Time, with the pilot episode of Touched by an Angel ("The Southbound Bus") as its inaugural broadcast. Variety's 2019 Nielsen ratings list showed that Start TV averaged 114,000 viewers in prime time, up 65% from the 2018 average.

== Programming ==
Similar to its male-targeted sister network Heroes & Icons (H&I), Start TV airs legal/police procedurals and various other dramas (with Gilmore Girls added in May 2025) - but instead targeting a female audience, featuring shows led by/centered around women. The network features series from the 1980s to the 2010s, and runs a uniform programming schedule with shows airing mainly at the same time seven days a week. Start TV also has a one-hour block of E/I children's programming on Sunday mornings between 8 a.m. and 9 a.m. Eastern Time in order to fulfill FCC obligations.

Due to its partial ownership by CBS (Paramount), Start TV also airs late night replays of CBS produced syndicated shows The Drew Barrymore Show, Entertainment Tonight and Inside Edition.

== Affiliates ==
As of August 2018, Start TV had affiliation agreements with television stations in 27 media markets encompassing 20 states, covering 45.52% of the United States. The network is carried on the digital subchannels of television stations in most of its markets (with potential exceptions in certain areas where a future affiliate may opt to carry the network on its main feed), and is also carried on cable television providers through their digital tiers at the discretion of the affiliate's parent station in certain markets. The network initially launched primarily on subchannels of stations owned by Weigel Broadcasting and CBS Television Stations. (In many of the CBS markets, Start TV displaced Weigel and CBS's classic television network venture Decades, with Weigel assuming the local Decades affiliation rights on stations it owns in certain markets where CBS Television Stations owns a CBS and/or CW owned-and-operated station, such as Los Angeles and San Francisco.) Bahakel Communications also contributed stations to serve as charter affiliates.

In South Bend, Indiana (where Weigel Broadcasting owns ABC affiliate WBND-LD, CW affiliate WCWW-LD and MyNetworkTV affiliate WMYS-LD) and Milwaukee, Wisconsin (where Weigel owns CBS affiliate WDJT-TV, independent station WMLW, MeTV owned-and-operated station WBME-CD and Telemundo affiliate WYTU-LD), the network displaced This TV on WCWW-LD2 and WYTU-LD3, effectively leaving that network without an affiliate in either market. (Weigel – which was part-owner of that network from its founding in October 2008 – had continued to hold the This TV affiliation rights for the Milwaukee market after Tribune Broadcasting assumed Weigel's interest and operational responsibilities in the network in November 2013; Tribune's former Milwaukee station, WITI, never claimed the This TV affiliation in the market despite Weigel moving the This affiliation to lower-tier channel slots several times.)

In October 2020, Start TV was made available on Sling TV. On April 19, 2022, Start TV began airing on the Frndly TV live streaming service.

=== Current affiliates ===
Current affiliates for Start TV
Media market	State/District	Station	Channel
Montgomery–Tuskegee	Alabama	WBMM	22.2
Tuscaloosa–Birmingham	Alabama	WSES	33.3
Anchorage	Alaska	KTUU-TV	2.3
Phoenix	Arizona	KUTP	45.5
Tucson	Arizona	KTTU-TV	18.4
Bakersfield	California	KNXT-LD	53.4
Los Angeles	California	KCBS-TV	2.2
Merced–Fresno	California	KGMC	43.10
Sacramento–Stockton–Modesto	California	KOVR	13.2
San Francisco–Oakland–San Jose	California	KPIX-TV	5.2
Denver	Colorado	KCNC-TV	4.2
Hartford–New Haven	Connecticut	WHCT-LD	35.3
Washington	District of Columbia	WTTG	5.3
Jacksonville	Florida	WJXT	4.3
Miami–Fort Lauderdale	Florida	WFOR-TV	4.2
Orlando	Florida	WKMG-TV	6.4
Tampa–St. Petersburg	Florida	WTOG	44.2
West Palm Beach–Boca Raton–Fort Pierce	Florida	WFLX	29.5
Atlanta	Georgia	WUPA	69.2
Columbus	Georgia	WXTX	54.6
Honolulu	Hawaii	KITV	4.3
Boise	Idaho	KRID-LD	22.6
Pocatello–Idaho Falls	Idaho	KVUI	31.8
Chicago	Illinois	WBBM-TV	2.2
Chicago	Illinois	WMEU-CD	48.2
Rockford	Illinois	WFBN-LD	35.3
Evansville	Indiana	WZDS-LD	5.2
Fort Wayne	Indiana	WISE-TV	33.5
Indianapolis	Indiana	WBXI-CD	47.1
Lafayette	Indiana	WLFI-TV	18.5
South Bend	Indiana	WCWW-LD	25.2
Davenport	Iowa	KWQC-TV	6.5
Des Moines	Iowa	KDIT-CD	45.3
Iowa City	Iowa	KWKB	20.4
Topeka	Kansas	WIBW-TV	13.4
Wichita	Kansas	KSCW-DT	33.4
Bowling Green	Kentucky	WNKY-LD	35.3
Louisville	Kentucky	WBNA	21.2
Alexandria	Louisiana	KBCA	41.3
Lafayette	Louisiana	KLWB	50.4
Monroe	Louisiana	KMLU	11.4
New Orleans	Louisiana	WVUE-DT	8.6
Shreveport	Louisiana	KPXJ	21.3
Baltimore	Maryland	WJZ-TV	13.2
Boston	Massachusetts	WBZ-TV	4.2
Springfield	Massachusetts	WSHM-LD	33.3
Detroit	Michigan	WWJ-TV	62.2
Flint–Saginaw–Bay City–Midland	Michigan	WJRT-TV	12.4
Grand Rapids–Muskegon	Michigan	WZZM	13.9
Marquette	Michigan	WZMQ	19.4
Traverse City–Cadillac	Michigan	WMNN-LD	26.2
Duluth	Minnesota	KCWV	27.5
Minneapolis–St. Paul	Minnesota	WCCO-TV	4.2
Walker–Bemidji	Minnesota	KCCW-TV	12.2
Meridian	Mississippi	WOOK-LD	15.3
Kansas City	Missouri	KCTV	5.3
Kansas City	Missouri	KGKC-LD	39.2
St. Louis	Missouri	KNLC	24.6
Lincoln	Nebraska	KOLN	10.2
Omaha	Nebraska	WOWT	6.5
Las Vegas	Nevada	KHSV	21.3
Reno	Nevada	KOLO-TV	8.6
Albuquerque	New Mexico	KASA-TV	15.2
Albany	New York	WNYT	13.3
Buffalo	New York	WBBZ-TV	67.6
New York City	New York	WCBS-TV	2.2
Rochester	New York	WHEC-TV	10.3
Syracuse	New York	WTVU-CD	22.4
Charlotte	North Carolina	WCCB	18.5
Raleigh–Durham–Fayetteville	North Carolina	WRAL-TV	5.3
Cincinnati	Ohio	WBQC-LD	25.4
Cleveland	Ohio	WBNX-TV	55.5
Columbus	Ohio	WCSN-LD	32.3
Oklahoma City	Oklahoma	KTUZ-TV	30.6
Tulsa	Oklahoma	KMYT-TV	41.3
Astoria	Oregon	KPWT-LD	3.2
Erie	Pennsylvania	WICU-TV	12.4
Johnstown	Pennsylvania	WTOO-CD	50.2
Philadelphia	Pennsylvania	KYW-TV	3.2
Pittsburgh	Pennsylvania	KDKA-TV	2.2
Columbia	South Carolina	WOLO-TV	25.2
Greenville–Spartanburg–Anderson	South Carolina	WGGS-TV	16.5
Myrtle Beach	South Carolina	WFXB	43.3
Chattanooga	Tennessee	WYHB-CD	39.4
Kingsport	Tennessee	WKPT-TV	19.5
Memphis	Tennessee	WLMT	30.3
Nashville	Tennessee	WJFB	44.3
Corpus Christi	Texas	KQSY-LD	30.2
Dallas–Fort Worth	Texas	KTVT	11.2
Houston	Texas	KPRC-TV	2.2
San Antonio	Texas	KSAT-TV	12.5
Waco	Texas	KNCT	46.3
Cedar City–St. George	Utah	KCSG	8.3
Ogden–Salt Lake City	Utah	KCSG-LD	8.3
Burlington	Vermont	WCAX-TV	3.4
Chesapeake–Norfolk–Virginia Beach	Virginia	WSKY-TV	4.2
Roanoke–Lynchburg	Virginia	WSLS-TV	10.4
Richmond	Virginia	WUPV	65.5
Bellingham	Washington	KVOS-TV	12.5
Tacoma–Seattle	Washington	KSTW	11.2
Yakima	Washington	KAPP	35.4
Bluefield	West Virginia	WVVA	6.5
Clarksburg	West Virginia	WVFX	10.3
Eau Claire	Wisconsin	WEAU	13.5
Green Bay	Wisconsin	WBAY-TV	2.5
Madison	Wisconsin	WMTV	15.5
Milwaukee	Wisconsin	WDJT-TV	58.5
Milwaukee	Wisconsin	WYTU-LD	63.2
