= This TV =

American digital television network

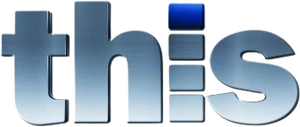
- Type: Defunct free-to-air television network
- Country: United States
- Broadcast area: Nationwide, via digital terrestrial television (83% U.S.coverage)
- Headquarters: Century City, California

Programming
- Picture format: 720p (HDTV); 480i or 480p 4:3 (normal and letterbox) (SDTV)

Ownership
- Owner: Allen Media Group
- Parent: Allen Media Broadcast Networks, LLC

History
- Founded: July 28, 2008; 18 years ago
- Launched: November 1, 2008; 18 years ago
- Closed: May 31, 2024; 2 years ago
- Replaced by: TheGrio

This TV (also known as This TV Network and alternately stylized as thisTV) was an American free-to-air television network owned by Allen Media Broadcast Networks, LLC, part of the Allen Media Group division of Entertainment Studios. Originally formed in 2008, as a joint venture between Metro-Goldwyn-Mayer and Weigel Broadcasting, the network carried various unscripted series from Entertainment Studios' library. The network originally had a large programming emphasis on films, primarily sourced from the library of former owner MGM, but all films were removed from the schedule in 2024. Classic television series and children's programming had also aired on the network previously. The network quietly closed and merged into TheGrio on May 31, 2024, with the website eventually shutting down on July 13.

The network was available in many media markets via broadcast television stations, primarily on their digital subchannels, and on select cable television providers through carriage of a local affiliate (primarily on digital cable tiers). This TV's programming and business operations were headquartered in Century City, California with the rest of Entertainment Studio's operations; MGM provided advertising sales for the network through offices in New York City.

== History ==
Logo from 2008 to 2021 (although the logo was still used in TV idents).

Film and television studio Metro-Goldwyn-Mayer and Chicago, Illinois-based television station owner Weigel Broadcasting announced the formation of This TV on July 28, 2008, with a launch planned for that fall. The "This TV" name was chosen as a branding and marketing avenue for the network and its stations, with slogans such as "This is the Place for Movies", "It Doesn't Get Any Better than This", "This is What You're Watching", "Stay Here for This" and "This is the Channel!" proposed for use in on-air promotions.

This TV formally launched at 9:00 p.m. ET on November 1, 2008, with the 1986 Spike Lee-directed film She's Gotta Have It as the network's first program. However, some initial affiliates may have "soft launched" the network one day earlier, on October 31, 2008, to carry some Halloween-themed programming that was provided by the network. At launch, in addition to featuring content sourced largely from the MGM film and television library, Canada-based Cookie Jar Group (now WildBrain) provided children's programming for This TV's daily morning schedule until November 2013.

Under Weigel Broadcasting part-ownership, the network's operations were overseen by Neal Sabin, who in his role as Weigel's executive vice president oversaw the national launch of MeTV, a classic television network similar in format to This TV though with an almost exclusive focus on comedic and dramatic series. Jim Marketti, president/CEO of Marketti Creative Group, was hired in August 2008 as This TV's creative director, focusing on the network's marketing and promotion.

On May 13, 2013, Weigel Broadcasting announced that it would be leaving the This TV partnership to focus on Movies!, a similar film-oriented multicast network that Weigel launched in partnership with Fox Television Stations in January 2013. Tribune Broadcasting, owners of the classic television multicast network Antenna TV, acquired Weigel's co-ownership and assumed daily operations of This TV on November 1, 2013; concurrently, the network moved its affiliation in Chicago from the fifth digital subchannel of Weigel flagship station WCIU-TV (channel 26) to a newly created third subchannel of Tribune's television flagship WGN-TV (channel 9). On May 2, 2017, Sinclair Broadcast Group announced its KidsClick children's programming block that would air on This TV starting on July 1, 2017. KidsClick left This TV on July 1, 2018.

On October 28, 2020, Byron Allen's Allen Media Group (which also controls Entertainment Studios) announced that it would be buying This TV and Light TV from MGM. After the transition, This TV launched a permanent high-definition master feed, allowing its affiliates to carry the network in a widescreen format for the first time.

Throughout 2024, This TV was removed from many of its affiliates, with coverage sharply declining from 73.6% of the U.S. population in January to 1.42% by July. This included affiliates from ABC Owned Television Stations, who gave the network coverage in major cities, and network owner Allen Media Group. Although an exact date is unconfirmed, This TV shut down on May 31, 2024; its website was blanked and on July 13, it was completely shut down.

== Programming ==
Before This TV's closure, the network's programming schedule relied primarily on the programs of Entertainment Studios, having previously relied on the library of films owned by previous network co-owner MGM and subsidiary United Artists. The use of on-air presenters had once been considered for This TV's movie broadcasts. However, the network did display a digital on-screen graphic during its programs, and affiliates were inclined to include regional descriptors reflecting the station's primary broadcast area or the station's own logo underneath the network bug. The network added three hours of paid programming time in 2021, expanded to six hours by 2024.

Films broadcast on the network featured commercial interruption, and breaks during its programming primarily consist of direct response television advertising, generic national advertising, and public service announcements. The network's first continuity announcer was Milwaukee radio personality Robb Edwards, who was replaced later in the Weigel era by Jim Cummings; Andy Geller, the primary promo voice of ABC in the 2000s, started announcing the network when Tribune assumed partial ownership of This TV.

In January 2022, the network underwent a format change: episodes of The Rat Patrol were removed, movies began airing starting in the late afternoon, and the morning and early to mid-afternoon timeslots were filled with E/I programming. Four months later, the E/I programming block was shortened and movies began airing at noon precisely.

In January 2024, MGM films were removed from the network as MGM declined to renew its contract agreement with the network after its acquisition by Amazon, and started airing library content from the AMG library, mainly weather-related reality series from The Weather Channel, including Storm Of Suspicion and Weather Gone Viral until its shut down in May 2024.

=== Films ===
This TV's daily schedule originally consisted largely of feature films, which aired on Mondays through Saturdays from 6:00 a.m. to 4:00 am, and Sundays from 6:00 to 10:00 am, 2:00 to 6:00 p.m. and 2:00 to 4:00 am. Eastern Time (sometimes starting earlier or ending later depending on the length of the films). The film roster did not concentrate on films from any specific era (although the network's film slate primarily focused on releases made after 1960), meaning any film from the Great Depression to contemporary times, and films made for either television, home video/DVD or theatrical release would be featured.

The network's film telecasts were usually "television" cuts meant for broadcast syndication which feature content edits, dubbing or muting of profanities (including some that may otherwise be permissible on broadcast television) and some time edits by removing several scenes (mostly adult-oriented) to fit within a two-hour timeslot with commercials. Before the transition to an HD master feed, many of the syndicated versions of the network's films were older cuts unoptimized for HD presentation, shown in a pan and scan format more suitable for older fullscreen television sets, along with abrupt cuts for commercials that are ill-suited to a digital television network, rather than a traditional television station.

Films featured on This TV consisted of releases from previous network co-parent Metro-Goldwyn-Mayer and its subsidiaries United Artists (post-1952 films) and The Samuel Goldwyn Company (pre-1997 films), as well as films produced by defunct studios whose libraries were purchased by MGM, including Orion Pictures (post-1981 films and its Orion Classics division), The Cannon Group, Inc. (except for those co-produced with Warner Bros.), American International Pictures, and The Mirisch Company (all of which were acquired by MGM). In addition, the pre-1996 library of films held by PolyGram Filmed Entertainment were also featured on the network, alongside various Miramax films (a former subsidiary of Disney) depending on which owner holds the rights to a film. Under Weigel co-ownership, This TV aired The Pink Panther short cartoons to interstitial program surplus airtime when a film concludes more than five minutes before the end of the film's allotted timeslot.

==== Film blocks ====
This TV also commonly featured themed movie presentations, with the entire day's schedule consisting of films from a particular genre once a week throughout the month (such as Mondays, which feature drama and romance films under the theme "From the Heart" and Wednesdays, which feature action and Western films under the theme "Wednesdays Are Wild"). On certain days, the network would air varying genres of films separated by daypart (for example, crime films during the day and comedies at night). The network also broadcast a featured movie in primetime at 8:00 pm. Eastern Time on Monday through Friday nights.

Until October 31, 2013, the weeknight prime movie presentations were typically replayed later in the evening (usually at 12:00 am. Eastern Time, depending on the length of the film that preceded it), which allowed viewers which had This TV's primetime pre-empted by a secondary network to watch those films. From the network's launch until October 26, 2013, This TV ran a family film block preceding the network's Saturday morning Cookie Jar Toons lineup called "This Family Friendly"; under Tribune part-ownership, this block was discontinued, with a wider variety of films (mostly targeted at an adult audience) filling the block's former Saturday morning slot; however, family-oriented films remain part of the network's schedule, only airing on certain days in random timeslots and depending in part on the titles selected for that month's film slate. During 2014, the network shared select older film titles with sister network Antenna TV (which ran its own movie block until January 2015), with some films airing on both networks at several times during the same day or week.

=== Classic television series ===
In addition to its film content, the network also carried a modest amount of vintage comedy and drama series from the 1950s to the 1990s, airing in the early morning most days of the week and on weekend evenings. Its core bIock of classic programming was called "TV Night on This," a weekend-only prime time and late night television lineup (comprising multi-episode blocks of two series each night) which launched on January 10, 2016, as an extension of an existing Sunday evening rerun block that maintained a more generalized format dating back to the network's launch; in September 2016, the lineup consisted of Westerns (The Magnificent Seven and Dead Man's Gun) on Saturdays and police procedurals (In the Heat of the Night and Cagney & Lacey) on Sundays. By 2021, most MGM-owned library television series were eliminated from the lineup.

Most of the network's series programming aired during the early morning hours during pre-determined breaks within the network's movie schedule (which consisted of Sea Hunt, Flipper and Mackenzie's Raiders). After Tribune Broadcasting assumed operations of This TV, three series formerly seen on the network (The Patty Duke Show, Mister Ed and Green Acres) were moved from the network to new sister network Antenna TV.

=== Children's programming ===
Under Weigel's co-ownership, This TV featured a daily morning block of children's programs that was produced by Canada-based Cookie Jar Group, then by DHX Media (now WildBrain) when it purchased Cookie Jar in 2012. It also featured a Weigel-produced program originally produced for its Chicago flagship WCIU-TV, Green Screen Adventures (which later aired exclusively on MeTV outside the Chicago market). The block's main children's programming was branded under the banner name "This is for Kids", while a separate lineup of Cookie Jar-produced shows that met the Federal Communications Commission's regulations on children's television programming in the United States requirements was branded under the name "Cookie Jar Toons". Children's programs were featured in both blocks included library content from CJE entities DIC Entertainment and Cinar, as well as recent originally produced content by Cookie Jar.

Once Tribune assumed part-ownership of This TV, the network relegated its children's program only to Sunday mornings, coinciding with discontinuance of the network's agreement with Cookie Jar/DHX, effectively ending This TV's status as the only digital multicast network and one of only two broadcast networks, alongside The CW (which discontinued their children's block Vortexx in favor of the fully E/I-compliant One Magnificent Morning in October 2014), to carry a traditional entertainment-based children's block instead of a strictly educational-based lineup; the former Cookie Jar Toons/This is for Kids block was replaced with a three-hour weekly block of E/I-compliant programs originally distributed for syndication by Bellum Entertainment Group; these were joined by select series from Steve Rotfeld Productions in March 2016.

On May 3, 2017, Sinclair Broadcast Group announced that it would launch KidsClick, a multi-platform children's programming endeavor featuring long-form and short-form animated content from various production studios. Sinclair choose This TV as the national carrier of the three-hour morning cartoon block, which introduced on July 1, coinciding with the launch of a syndicated version that would initially be carried on Sinclair-operated stations in certain markets. On July 1, 2018, This TV discontinued carriage of KidsClick, which was transferred full-time to Sinclair-owned online content-focused network TBD (which began carrying the block on a transitional basis two months prior on May 7). KidsClick would later be discontinued on March 31, 2019.

== Affiliates ==
In addition to its carriage on Weigel-owned stations in Chicago (WCIU-TV), Milwaukee (WDJT-TV) and South Bend, Indiana (WCWW-LD) at the network's launch, This TV reached affiliation agreements with several television station groups (including Hearst Television, the Sinclair Broadcast Group, Graham Media Group, Fisher Communications, Raycom Media and Belo) to add the network on the subchannels of some of their stations in 2009. A May 2010 renewal of its affiliation agreement with Tribune Broadcasting expanded the network to additional stations owned by the company in markets such as KTLA, WPIX, WSFL-TV and KSWB-TV, helping increase This TV's market coverage to 85% of the U.S. and making it the largest subchannel network by population reach percentage (a status that has since been surpassed by former sister network MeTV). A number of NBC affiliates added This TV as a replacement for the now-defunct NBC Weather Plus service, which shut down in November 2008. Additionally, Equity Media Holdings selected This TV as a replacement for the Retro Television Network on some of its stations after the company terminated its relationship with RTN in January 2009, due to a payment dispute; the Equity-owned stations have since been sold, with several disaffiliating from This TV or shutting down completely.

Stations that carried This TV had the option to air select programming from the network on their main channels; affiliates also had the option to preempt select This TV programs, running alternate programming in place of certain shows from the network's national schedule (some stations may even switch to scheduled alternate programming while a film was in progress), either through a secondary affiliation deal with another network such as The CW or MyNetworkTV (this was particularly common with This TV affiliates in smaller markets), substitutions by locally produced programming, or in the most common case, moving network programming to the This TV subchannel to accommodate local sports or breaking news coverage on the main channel.

After Tribune Broadcasting assumed operational responsibilities for the network, This TV became one of the few television networks to move its flagship station; the network moved from WCIU to a digital subchannel of Tribune's Chicago flagship WGN-TV (which until November 1, 2013 was the largest Tribune-owned station by market size not to carry This TV). In Milwaukee, Weigel continued to carry the network on WDJT following Tribune's December 2013 outright acquisition of the market's Fox affiliate, WITI (which also carries sister network Antenna TV) along with its other stations from Local TV LLC; on March 3, 2015, Weigel moved This TV to WDJT's sister independent station, WMLW-TV, on its DT3 subchannel; its former channel slot on WDJT was concurrently filled by the Weigel-owned network Heroes & Icons, effectively consolidating the group's main subchannel networks onto WDJT's digital signal while allowing Weigel to fulfill its existing contract for This TV; through the move, the network's cable coverage was affected in the channel exchange with some area cable providers having to sign new agreements to carry the network via WMLW-DT3. In South Bend, its status on WCWW did not change, partly because Tribune does not own a television station in that market, unlike in Chicago and Milwaukee. Weigel transferred This TV to WYTU-LD3 on January 8, 2018, due to a large-scale channel remapping involving the spectrum auction, finally discontinuing their run of This TV in Milwaukee on September 3, 2018, upon the launch of Start TV (it later became a subchannel of local independent subchannel outlet WIWN).

The first Tribune owned or operated station to affiliate with the network since its purchase of Local TV and assumption of the network's operations was Hampton Roads market CBS affiliate WTKR, which added the network to its newly created second digital subchannel on December 6, 2014; most of ex-Local TV stations, including KAUT-TV in Oklahoma City and WHO-DT in Des Moines, Iowa, would later add This TV to their subchannels during the same period between 2014 and 2016.

In 2014, Tribune began to produce promotional advertisements for This TV that it distributed to its affiliates for broadcast on their main signals (which were modified to allow stations to insert over-the-air and cable channel information) in high-definition television.

In late-2014, Raycom Media begin to wind down their carriage agreement to carry This TV on its stations, as it favors with two new Katz Broadcasting (now Scripps Networks)-owned networks, Grit and Escape (now Ion Mystery); most of its stations (including KSLA in Shreveport, Louisiana, WAVE in Louisville, Kentucky, WCSC-TV in Charleston, South Carolina, and WMC-TV in Memphis, Tennessee) replaced it with their said or other networks (mostly Grit) on their subchannels by the start of 2015 and 2016. Most of its Raycom markets with This TV later found home on low-power stations, though many of those markets were left without a affiliate. Although Raycom acquired Drewry Communications in 2015, company former flagship KSWO-TV in Lawton, Oklahoma continued to carry This TV on its third digital subchannel for two more years following the acquisition, until it was replaced by former sister network MeTV in January 2018. By 2019, the year Raycom was acquired by Gray Television (now Gray Media), KCBD in Lubbock, Texas was the final former Raycom station to had This TV on a digital subchannel; when that deal ended in the start of 2020, KCBD replaced its second subchannel with the new country/lifestyle network Circle.

After Tribune was acquired by Nexstar Media Group on September 19, 2019, a number of former Tribune stations removed This TV by the end of October 2019, due to a new agreement with Katz Broadcasting to carry a reincarnated version of the court/true crime news network Court TV made before the close of the Nexstar deal. A few markets saw This TV move to a new station, though for the most part, the network's distribution was temporarily unavailable in many major markets, or saw downgrades to low-power television stations with no pay TV coverage.

In April 2021, the ABC Owned Television Stations added the network as a replacement for Laff after its owner, E. W. Scripps Company, moved the network to Ion Television stations in those markets after assuming management of Laff's previous owner, Katz Broadcasting, restoring much of the major-market coverage which became unavailable from 2019. ABC Owned Television Stations would later replace This TV with Charge!, a network owned by Sinclair Broadcast Group, on April 1, 2024.
