= WYTU-LD =

Television station in Milwaukee

- Milwaukee, Wisconsin; United States
- Channels: Digital: 16 (UHF); Virtual: 63
- Branding: Telemundo Wisconsin; Noticiero Telemundo Wisconsin (newscasts)

Programming
- Affiliations: 63.1: Telemundo; for others, see § WYTU-LD subchannels

Ownership
- Owner: Weigel Broadcasting; (Channel 41 and 63 Limited Partnership)
- Sister stations: WDJT-TV, WBME-CD, WMLW-TV

History
- Founded: December 11, 1981
- First air date: July 31, 1989
- Former call signs: W46AR (1989–1999); WYTU-LP (1999–2012)
- Former channel numbers: Analog: 46 (UHF, 1989–1999), 63 (UHF, 1999–2012); Digital: 49.4 (UHF, WMLW-TV simulcast, 2012–2018)
- Former affiliations: Univision (1989–1999); CBS (via WDJT-TV, DTV transitional on analog, June–December 2009); Independent/MeTV (DTV transitional on analog, 2010–2011)
- Call sign meaning: y tú, Spanish for "and you"

Technical information
- Licensing authority: FCC
- Facility ID: 168618
- Class: LD
- ERP: 7 kW
- HAAT: 300.3 m (985 ft)
- Transmitter coordinates: 43°6′42″N 87°55′50″W
- Translator(s): WDJT-TV 58.4 Milwaukee (SD full-power repeater); WMEI 31.6 Shawano–Green Bay; WMYS-LD 69.2 South Bend, IN

Links
- Public license information: LMS
- Website: telemundowi.com

Translator
- WFBN-LD
- Rockford, Illinois
- Channels: Digital: 23 (UHF); Virtual: 35
- Branding: Telemundo Rockford

Programming
- Affiliations: 35.1: Heroes & Icons; 35.2: Telemundo; 35.3: Story Television

History
- Founded: November 14, 1988
- Former call signs: W33AR (1989–1999); WFBN-LP (1999–2012)
- Former channel numbers: Analog: 33 (UHF, 1989–2012)
- Former affiliations: Independent (via WCIU/WFBT, 1989–1999; sole affiliation, 1999–2014)
- Call sign meaning: "Focus Broadcasting Network" (calls originated with first owners of WGBO in the 1980s)

Technical information
- Facility ID: 168664
- Class: LD
- ERP: 15 kW
- HAAT: 197.8 m (649 ft)
- Transmitter coordinates: 42°17′48″N 89°10′15″W

Links
- Public license information: LMS

WYTU-LD (channel 63) is a low-power television station in Milwaukee, Wisconsin, United States, affiliated with the Spanish-language network Telemundo. Owned by Weigel Broadcasting, it is sister to CBS affiliate WDJT-TV (channel 58), Class A MeTV station WBME-CD (channel 41) and independent station WMLW-TV (channel 49). The stations share studios in the Renaissance Center office complex on South 60th Street in West Allis (with a Milwaukee postal address); WYTU-LD's transmitter is located in Milwaukee's Lincoln Park (next to the transmitter belonging to ABC affiliate WISN-TV, channel 12).

Due to WYTU's low-power status, its broadcasting radius does not reach all of southeastern Wisconsin. Therefore, the station can also be seen through a 16:9 widescreen standard definition simulcast on WDJT-TV's fourth digital subchannel in order to reach the entire market. This relay signal can be seen on channel 58.4 from the same Lincoln Park transmitter facility. WYTU is also relayed on WFBN-LD (channel 35.2) in Rockford, Illinois, WMYS-LD (channel 69.2) in South Bend, Indiana and WMEI (channel 31.6) in Green Bay, Wisconsin.

The station airs all of Telemundo's schedule, along with Spanish-language coverage of Sunday afternoon Milwaukee Brewers baseball home games, using camera positions shared with Bally Sports Wisconsin. WYTU-LD is also available via Dish Network and Charter Spectrum's systems throughout their entire state service area as far west as La Crosse and as far north as Bayfield, making for a rare example of an intra-region superstation in the digital age.

== History ==
The station has mostly been a feeder of the entire schedule of Univision and Telemundo through most of its history, with new local programming being added to the schedule as the station (and Telemundo's schedule) has gained strength. In 1999, Weigel dropped Univision in a compensation dispute and affiliated with Telemundo, and within the year, the station moved to UHF channel 63 from channel 46 as W63CU, in order to accommodate WDJT's channel 46 digital signal and the company's move to one tower in Lincoln Park for all its operations. In mid-December 2003, the station took the lettered call sign WYTU-LP as it began to solicit local advertising from the growing Latino population in the Milwaukee area and Weigel began to push for extended cable coverage by including it in retransmission consent negotiations for WDJT.

WYTU's "Telemundo 63" logo before the addition of multiple simulcasts on WMLW-DT4 and in South Bend and Rockford.

The station signed on its digital signal on UHF channel 17 on December 10, 2007. Unlike the channel 13 digital signal of WMLW (which receives interference from WZZM in Grand Rapids), WYTU-LD's digital signal reaches the southern portion of the adjacent Green Bay–Appleton market, and is somewhat unrestricted as WXMI, the former occupant of channel 17 in the Grand Rapids market, now broadcasts on digital channel 20, although that station's Muskegon translator W17DF-D also broadcasts on channel 17. As a result of carriage agreements by Time Warner Cable and Charter Communications for access to the WDJT signal and to provide network service to areas without a Telemundo affiliate, WYTU is carried through the entirety of the state, especially after Time Warner and Charter's merger into Spectrum in 2017. Currently, due to different lineups and carriage contracts among the providers which will eventually be united in Spectrum's next agreement with Weigel, the availability of the station's high definition feed depends on the individual system.

In January 2009, WYTU was added to sister station WBME's digital signal on digital subchannel 49.4, calls which changed on August 16, 2012, as part of the channel swap between WBME and WMLW to allow WMLW to launch full-power, high-definition operations.

The station's analog signal on channel 63 did not broadcast the Telemundo Wisconsin schedule from June 12, 2009, onward, when Weigel decided to convert that signal to an enhanced nightlight service instead, carrying WDJT's CBS schedule for the benefit of those viewers who were not yet prepared for the digital transition for full-power stations. The special agreement to carry CBS in an analog form ended on January 1, 2010, and from then until 2011, WYTU-LP carried the MeTV lineup, while Telemundo Wisconsin remained a digital-only offering via WYTU's digital signal and WMLW-DT4. On February 11, 2013, the Federal Communications Commission canceled WYTU's analog license.

The station converted their low-power channel 17 digital signal into a 720p high-definition signal on July 25, 2012, in time for Telemundo's Spanish-language coverage of the 2012 Summer Olympics. Following the Games, the station carried, for the first time in team history, Green Bay Packers preseason football with Spanish language play-by-play in full high definition on its designated digital signal. These broadcasts are simulcast in the Green Bay market over English-language MyNetworkTV affiliate WACY-TV (channel 32). In summer 2014, the standard definition simulcast on WMLW-DT4 began to scale network content to standard-definition widescreen depending on Active Format Description codes sent out over the Telemundo network feed.

On January 8, 2018, the full-power market-wide simulcast of WYTU moved to WDJT-DT4 due to WMLW's merge of their spectrum to the low-power WBME-CD. In addition, This TV (a network formerly owned by Weigel and now owned by Tribune Broadcasting), was moved to WYTU's second subchannel as part of the move and to manage bandwidth.

On September 3, 2018, Weigel launched the new female-focused Start TV network, replacing This after nearly ten years on Weigel channel spaces. The same day saw Weigel's Movies! network move to the newly-launched 63.3 subchannel, moving over from WISN-TV's second subchannel (which was replaced by Justice Network two days earlier). WFBN-LD3 additionally launched a third subchannel for Start TV in Rockford.

Sinclair, Weigel Broadcasting, and Milwaukee PBS decided on a switch date of January 8, 2018, for their various local spectrum moves, which included the market-wide simulcast of WYTU-LD, which moved from WMLW-DT4 to WDJT-DT4.

== Programming ==
=== Sports programming ===
WYTU is the Spanish-language over-the-air home of the Milwaukee Brewers, airing Sunday home games for the team, around 13 per season.

In 2024, WYTU parent company Weigel Broadcasting announced an agreement to broadcast 10 Milwaukee Bucks games during the 2023–24 NBA season. All 10 games aired in English on sister station WMLW-TV. The March 4 game was aired in Spanish by WYTU.

=== Newscasts ===
The station launched a nightly 10-minute newscast in July 2007 within the 10 p.m. national edition of Noticiero Telemundo, called Noticiero Telemundo Wisconsin, with production assistance from WDJT. Several on-air reporters and anchors within the WDJT newsroom have been bilingual, allowing reporters to file stories for both stations. The show is pre-recorded before WMLW's 9 p.m. and WDJT's 10 p.m. newscasts. It began to carry an 11 a.m. midday newscast leading into the newly-inaugurated national Noticias Telemundo Mediodía on June 4, 2018.

Recently, local content has made up the bulk of the 35 minutes of the program, with parts of the national newscast and stories from CNN en Español via CNN's Newsource wire service blended into the show. A public affairs program titled ¡Qué Pasa Wisconsin! airs on weekend mornings on the station. Recently that program, along with the 10 p.m. newscast, has been anchored by Jocelyne Pruna.

Local newscasts are broadcast weekdays at 11 a.m., 5 p.m., and 10 p.m.

== Subchannels ==
The stations' signals are multiplexed:

=== WYTU-LD subchannels ===
Subchannels of WYTU-LD
Subchannel	Res.	Short name	Programming
63.1	1080i	WYTU-HD	Telemundo
63.2	480i	StartTV	Start TV
63.3	480i	WEST	WEST
63.4	480i	MeTV+	MeTV+
63.12	480i	INFO	OnTV4U (infomercials)

=== WFBN-LD subchannels ===
Subchannels of WFBN-LD
Subchannel	Res.	Short name	Programming
23.11	1080i	CBS23	CBS (WIFR-LD)
35.1	720p	HEROES	Heroes & Icons
35.2	1080i	TMDO	Telemundo
35.3	480i	START	Start TV

Simulcast of subchannels of another station

Currently, Weigel Broadcasting has contracted with Gray Media to rebroadcast CBS affiliate WIFR-LD (channel 23) in the Rockford market, due to WIFR-LD's reallocated physical channel 28 experiencing interference in the northwestern portion of the market with WISN-TV in Milwaukee; it would otherwise be WFBN-LD 35.4.
