= Green Screen Adventures =

American children's television series

- Genre: children's television series
- Created by: Gail Sikevitz
- Written by: Jessica H. Carleton; Steve Gensler
- Directed by: Christopher M. Faulkner
- Starring: Jessica Honor Carleton; Ariel Coleman-Turner; Kierra Bunch; Rafael Torres; Brendan Buckley; Robert Schleifer
- Country of origin: United States
- Original language: English
- No. of seasons: 3 (as of September 2009)

Production
- Producers: Producer- Gail Sikevitz, AP- Liz O'Neill
- Production locations: 26 N. Halsted Street, Chicago, Illinois, student or teacher-submitted video
- Editors: Christopher Faulkner, Drew Pertl.
- Camera setup: Chroma key
- Running time: Half hour show
- Production company: Weigel Broadcasting

Original release
- Network: WCIU-TV
- Release: 2007 – 2008
- Network: This TV
- Release: October 2008 – 2013

Green Screen Adventures is a children's television series which premiered in 2007. The series was originally produced for local broadcast on WCIU-TV (Channel 26) in Chicago, which is the flagship station of Weigel Broadcasting, and is designed to fit the FCC's educational and information programming requirements while also being produced locally in Chicago. As of 2025, the program now also airs nationally on Weigel's MeTV digital subchannel network (it and Saved by the Bell serving as the network's E/I compliant programs, though it is not explicitly promoted as a MeTV program; airings do not even include a DOG logo for the network), and from October 2008 to 2013 it also aired on This TV when that network was operated by Weigel.

Green Screen Adventures features stories and drawings by students in first through eighth grade using sketch comedy, story theatre, game shows, original songs, puppetry and more. Since their debut in 2007, they have featured stories written by almost 1,000 elementary school students.

The show is set around the submissions of short stories, school reports, poetry, essays, basic academic questions and artwork from students between first and eighth grades. A parent or guardian then signs a standard release form if the idea is used in the series.

An ensemble of actors for the series then takes these submissions, and the program's writers and actors create a short teleplay which is acted out with minimal props, costumes and a chroma key backdrop (the titular green screen of the series.) The student's story is brought to life by the actors as the green screen becomes the world of the story or subject. The Green Screen also showcases the children's original artwork.

== Cast and crew ==
Jessica Honor Carleton is a writer, actress, puppeteer, puppet designer and storyteller, while Kierra Bunch, Brendan Buckley, Sasha Smith, Scott Gryder, Robert Schleifer, Alexander Knapp, and Zach Rebich are the actors and puppeteers. They all play the roles of people and animals. Katy Daso and Nancy McDonald are the floor directors and costume designers. Retired cast members include Christopher De Paola, Ariel Coleman-Turner, Frankie Benavides, Rafael Torres, Casie Walls, Nathan, Molly Wallace and Lawrence Thompson, who is a singer.

== Original characters ==
=== Characters played by Jessica Carleton ===
- Coach D.
- Detective McMystery
- Fuzzwink
- Gerald the Giraffe
- Lady Fontana
- Penny the Horse
- The Green Screen Clown
- Emily Cox Teamerie

=== Characters played by Ariel Coleman-Turner ===
- Earth Girl (later on changed to "Green Girl")
- Howie the Howling Monkey
- Martha Graham Cracker

=== Other ===
- Benjamin Noculars (played by Brendan Buckley)
- Fang the talking Zubat (played by Frankie Benavides)

== Puppets ==
Jessica Carleton designed the following puppets for "Green Screen Adventures" while the plush ones like an elephant, a monkey and an owl have been bought:

=== Sock Drawer Drama ===
- Gray cat with blue eyes
- Brown dog with light brown eyes
- Orange tiger
- Yellow mouse
- Sheep
- Wolf
- Fox
- Zebra
- Pig
- Cow

Note: These sock puppets are animals.

=== Food Folks ===
- Apple
- Banana
- Strawberry
- Hot dog
- Pepper
- Spaghetti
- Milkshake
- Pies (blueberry and cherry)
- Sandwich
- Tomato
- Waffle

=== Other ===
- Books
- Socks (blue and purple)
- Octopus (orange and pink)
- TV remote
- Card
- Marker
- Box
