= WBME-CD =

Television station in Milwaukee

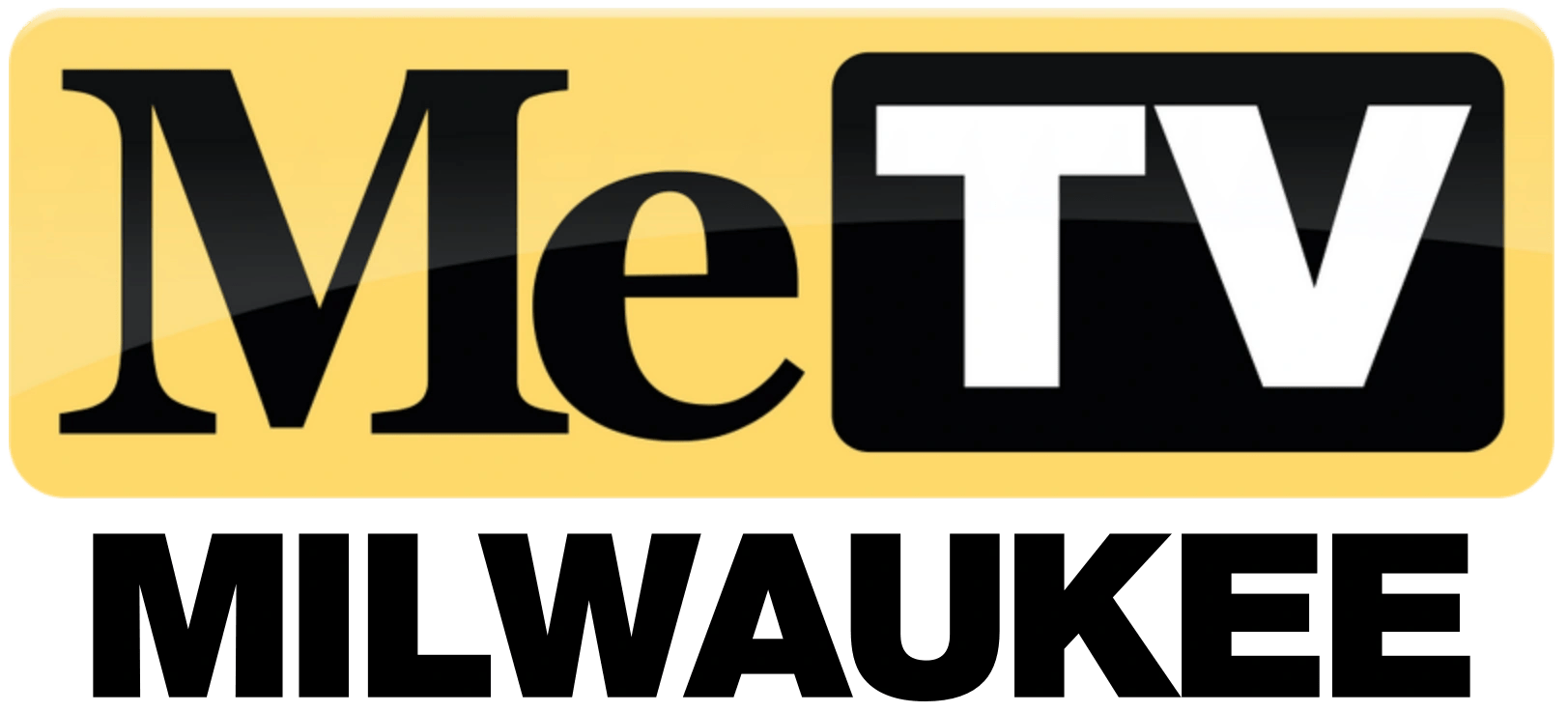
- Milwaukee, Wisconsin; United States
- Channels: Digital: 17 (UHF), shared with WMLW-TV; Virtual: 41
- Branding: MeTV Milwaukee

Programming
- Affiliations: 41.1: MeTV

Ownership
- Owner: Weigel Broadcasting; (Channel 41 and 63 Limited Partnership)
- Sister stations: WDJT-TV; WMLW-TV; WYTU-LD

History
- Founded: 1999 (in previous incarnations since 1983)
- Former call signs: W55AS (1983–1989); W65BT (1989–2000); W41CI (2000–2001); WMLW-LP (2001–2003); WMLW-CA (2003–2012); WBME-CA (2012–2013)
- Former channel numbers: Analog: 55 (UHF, 1983–1989), 65 (UHF, 1989–2000), 41 (UHF, 2000–2011); Digital: 13 (VHF, 2007–2012), 24 (UHF, 2012–2019)
- Former affiliations: WSNS-TV (simulcast, 1985–1989); WCIU-TV (simulcast, 1983-1985, 1989–1994); WGBO-TV (simulcast, 1994–1999); Univision (1983–1999); WebFN (2000–2002); Independent (2002–2012); America One (secondary until 2002); FoxBox/4Kids TV (2004–2008)
- Call sign meaning: "Memorable Entertainment Television" (MeTV's backronymed name; formerly suffixed with "-TV" during full-power run on channel 49)

Technical information
- Licensing authority: FCC
- Facility ID: 71422
- Class: CD
- ERP: 15 kW
- HAAT: 316.4 m (1,038 ft)
- Transmitter coordinates: 43°6′42″N 87°55′50″W
- Translator(s): WDJT-TV 58.2 Milwaukee

Links
- Public license information: Public file; LMS
- Website: www.metv.com

WBME-CD (channel 41) is a low-power, Class A television station in Milwaukee, Wisconsin, United States, airing programming from the classic television network MeTV. It is owned by Weigel Broadcasting alongside CBS affiliate WDJT-TV (channel 58), independent station WMLW-TV (channel 49) and low-power Telemundo affiliate WYTU-LD (channel 63). The stations share studios in the Renaissance Center office complex on South 60th Street in West Allis; WBME-CD's transmitter is located in Milwaukee's Lincoln Park.

Due to WBME-CD's low-power status, the broadcasting radius does not reach all of southeastern Wisconsin. Therefore, the station is simulcast in 16:9 widescreen standard definition on WDJT's second digital subchannel in order to reach the entire market. This relay signal can be seen on channel 58.2 from the same Lincoln Park transmitter facility.

== History ==
=== Early years ===
The station that is currently WBME-CD had existed in one way or another since the early 1980s on low-power translator stations: first on UHF channel 55 as W55AS, then by 1989, moving to channel 65 as W65BT. The station has been owned by Weigel Broadcasting since it signed on the air. Until the late 1990s, the station would air the Stock Market Observer business news block, which was produced by Chicago sister station WCIU-TV, from 7 a.m. to 5 p.m.; in fact, the station launched as a full translator of WCIU, receiving that station via a microwave link between WCIU's transmitter on the Sears Tower and a receiver dish atop the First Wisconsin/Firstar Center, and was Weigel's first successful attempt since trying to acquire the channel 49 license in Racine in 1965 to establish a station in Milwaukee. At night, the station ran a mix of home shopping programs, infomercials, religious shows, Spanish programming from Univision (before the launch of W46AR in 1990) and low-cost programming, including plenty of public domain and low-cost films. The station was watched by few because of insufficient cable carriage and better television choices in the Milwaukee market, along with Weigel trying to establish WDJT's presence in the market, especially after acquiring the market's CBS affiliation from WITI (channel 6) in December 1994. A harbinger of the station's future happened that month, when some of WDJT's syndicated programming that would have aired during CBS timeslots moved over to W65BT after the switch to fulfill existing contracts for those programs.

In 1999, Weigel obtained construction permits for new channel positions in the wake of having to move its Milwaukee low-power operations (which included then-Univision station W46AR (channel 46; now Telemundo affiliate WYTU-LD, channel 63) to accommodate WDJT's digital signal on channel 46, along with the inauguration of Weigel's new Lincoln Park transmitter for WDJT and the low-power stations, which united the company's transmitter operations into one facility. Towards the end of September 2000, the programming from channel 65 moved to the new channel 41 under the callsign W41CI, with the station's on-air brand becoming "TV-41".

In its first year, the station improved its programming, airing Weigel/Bridge Information Systems' WebFN financial news service during the day, and entertainment programs at night. The America One network aired during the overnight and morning hours (also to fulfill educational programming requirements), along with local news updates produced by WDJT that aired throughout the day. Then in mid-November 2001, channel 41 would acquire low-power status, allowing it to have a lettered call sign, which would end up being WMLW-LP (the WMLW call letters were previously used from 1982 to August 1989 by Watertown radio station WJJO (94.1 FM), with the calls standing for "mellow" as part of that station's then-soft rock format).

=== As an independent station ===
WMLW's "TV-41" logo, in use from the station's calling in September 2001 until September 2003, when the station found Time Warner basic cable carriage.

In 2002, the station began transitioning to become more of a true independent station, with the WebFN venture folding in the wake of the dot-com crash, freeing up the 7 a.m.–5 p.m. timeslot for other programming. Weigel acquired more syndicated programs for the station and found itself in a unique position as Milwaukee's only true independent television station.

Sinclair Broadcast Group–owned WVTV (channel 18) and WCGV-TV (channel 24) decided to focus more on their WB and UPN programming (which were later replaced by The CW and MyNetworkTV in September 2006) instead of running occasional sports coverage (which often preempted the network schedules, much to the annoyance of the local fanbases of each of the two network's shows); WCGV retained broadcast rights for the Milwaukee Bucks until the end of the 2006–07 season, and took themselves out of the race for local college and high school sports rights; there was also a lack of interest on the part of FSN North, which wanted to focus on teams with statewide interest, not just within the Milwaukee metro area. Therefore, Weigel decided to use channel 41 in order to take the rights for these sporting events and use the lure of the teams to gain carriage on local cable providers, knowing that it would be the only way to make channel 41 a viable player in Milwaukee broadcasting.

Time Warner Cable was strongly opposed to adding channel 41 to its Southeastern Wisconsin systems, arguing that the station was not a full-power signal and the sports were only a lure to add another unneeded station to their lineups. This came after must-carry rules pushed them to air religious station WWRS-TV (channel 52), and move Madison's PBS member station, WHA-TV, to digital cable to free up a basic channel. Weigel then encouraged viewers to call and write TWC and Charter Communications to add the station to their lineups in the wake of being the Milwaukee station that would air the WIAA high school basketball championships, using promotions on WDJT and in local newspapers to send the message.

After much campaigning, Charter decided to add WMLW to its basic cable service (channel 8 in most cities, channel 21 in Sheboygan), with Time Warner Cable carrying the station only over digital cable at first, allowing the WIAA coverage to be seen on cable at some level. A compromise would later be reached between Weigel and TWC as a part of retransmission consent negotiations for WDJT, and the station would become a part of the basic package throughout TWC's service area, moving from digital channel 741 to basic channel 7 in the fall of 2003. After securing cable carriage, the station began to identify only by the WMLW call letters and rarely mentioned its over-the-air channel number except in a few promotions, and visually in FCC-required identifications.

WMLW would drop America One programming in 2002, and began programming the entire day shortly thereafter. In mid-September 2003, WMLW became a Class A television station and added the "-CA" suffix to their call letters. In September 2004, Fox's 4Kids TV block moved to the station from WCGV, after that station decided to stop carrying Fox children's programming, the block aired on WMLW in lieu of WITI, which had no interest in airing the Fox-supplied children's programming. After the block was discontinued in December 2008, WMLW and WITI refused to carry the replacement Weekend Marketplace paid programming block, which is unseen in the market.

Local musical artist Pat McCurdy is the songwriter and singer of the station's former jingle and theme song as an independent station, "wmlw means Milwaukee". The station had a minor logo change in December 2010, keeping the same general theme but utilizing a different font.

=== Station swap with WMLW ===
WBME-CD logo used from 2012 to 2017.

On August 7, 2012, WBME and WMLW each swapped channel allocations. WBME's callsign (whose "-TV" suffix was changed to a "-CA" suffix with the swap) and MeTV affiliation moved from full-power channel 49 to low-power channel 41, while the WMLW call letters, and the syndicated and brokered programming inventory seen on channel 41 were moved to channel 49 as WMLW-TV. The move to the full-power channel 49 license allowed WMLW to broadcast in high definition for the first time. Since the channel 41 signal is a low-power allocation, MeTV programming is relayed on the 58.2 subchannel of WDJT-TV that relayed WMLW's programming prior to the swap.

Sometime in early 2013, a late-night rebroadcast of WDJT's 10 p.m. newscast began airing on WBME-CD at 12:30 a.m. (1:00 a.m. on early Monday mornings), replacing MeTV's national broadcast of Night Gallery. This is likely to meet the station's Class A license requirements, and a glut of programming on WDJT and WMLW making the rebroadcast unattainable on those stations.

=== Return of WMLW ===
On September 12, 2017, in a TVNewsCheck story about the purchase by Weigel of KAZA-TV in Los Angeles, it was revealed that WMLW, which Weigel had sold the spectrum of in the 2016 FCC spectrum auction, would see their channels moved to the channel space of WBME-CD at the start of 2018.

Sinclair, Weigel and Milwaukee PBS decided on a switch date of January 8 for their various local spectrum moves, and WMLW moved to WBME-CD's bandwidth at around 5 a.m. that morning. WMLW remained on its existing 49.1 position, with the WYTU-LD market-wide simulcast moving to WDJT-DT4, and Decades to WBME-CD2 (MeTV remained on 41.1). This TV moved to WYTU-LD2. WBME-CD continues to carry MeTV on 41.1, along with the 58.2 market-wide simulcast.

=== MeTV FM cross-promotion ===
On August 15, 2018, local Entercom station WMYX-FM (99.1) entered an agreement with Envision Networks to begin carrying Weigel's gold adult contemporary radio format MeTV FM (which is nationally distributed by Envision and matches the main Chicago playlist song-for-song) over WMYX's second HD Radio subchannel, which is cross-promoted by Weigel with WBME-CD, and the first market outside Chicago to carry both a MeTV station and a MeTV FM station.

== Technical information ==
=== Subchannels ===
Subchannels of WBME-CD and WMLW-TV
License	Subchannel	Res.	Short name	Programming
WBME-CD	41.1	720p	WBME-HD	MeTV
WMLW-TV	49.1	720p	WMLW-HD	Independent
WMLW-TV	49.2	480i	Movies!	Movies!
WMLW-TV	49.3	480i	H and I	Heroes & Icons
WMLW-TV	49.4	480i	Catchy	Catchy Comedy
WMLW-TV	49.5	480i	TOONS	MeTV Toons

The station launched its digital signal under the callsign WMLW-LD on VHF channel 13 in mid-December 2007. The simulcast on WDJT-TV's second digital subchannel remained due to channel 13's poor signal coverage to protect ABC affiliate WZZM-TV in Grand Rapids, Michigan, which is receivable across Lake Michigan and has a transmitter closer to the Michigan lakeshore than the other Grand Rapids area stations. As WZZM moved its digital signal from UHF channel 39 back to channel 13 in June 2009, these reception issues remained, and WDJT-DT2 for all intents and purposes is the signal that takes priority in station identification sequences, and is utilized as the signal source for cable and satellite providers within the Milwaukee market.

At the beginning of 2009, Weigel proposed to move WMLW's analog signal to UHF channel 24 in order to reduce interference from Green Bay NBC affiliate WGBA-TV (channel 26), which operates its digital signal on channel 41, along with Rockford, Illinois CBS affiliate WIFR (channel 23), whose digital signal also operates on channel 41. The move was possible since WCGV, which formerly held the channel 24 allocation in the Milwaukee market for its analog signal, shut down its analog signal in early March 2009. No further action was taken on this application, and it was assumed WMLW's analog operations would end on channel 41 once analog service is discontinued either by FCC action or exhaustion of the analog transmitter (as Weigel has done once their South Bend low-power stations reached end-of-life on their analog transmitters).

On April 13, 2012, WMLW applied to move its digital signal from channel 13 to channel 24, the proposed analog allotment. Interference is possible in some portions of the market as Muskegon's WTLJ (channel 54) is also broadcast on digital channel 24 and its signal has heavy propagation across Lake Michigan. On April 25, the FCC granted WMLW a construction permit to move to channel 24. With the facilities built and Weigel receiving FCC approval, Weigel wound down operations on channel 13 during the afternoon of July 27, and launched WMLW-LD on channel 24 shortly afterwards that same day, with the call letter change to WBME-CA taking place on August 15. With the move from channel 13 to channel 24, the digital license was upgraded from low-power to Class A status. On January 7, 2013, the call sign was officially changed to WBME-CD.

Beginning on February 8, 2016, WBME-CD began to be carried in a 16:9 format over 41.1 and 58.2 full-time despite carrying mainly 4:3 content (limited 16:9 remasters of MeTV series are part of the network's schedule), which allows Weigel's Milwaukee-specific advertising and the 10 p.m. newscast to be carried in its native format without letterboxing or removal of elements cut off in a 4:3 frame. In January 2018, WBME's channel 41 transmission was converted to a 720p high definition presentation, several months after MeTV's master feed was converted to an HD format.
