= MeTV =

American broadcast television network

- Type: Broadcast television network (classic TV)
- Country: United States
- Broadcast area: 93.56% OTA coverage MeTV+: 34.99% OTA coverage Both streaming
- Headquarters: Chicago, Illinois

Programming
- Language: English
- Picture format: 720p HDTV master feed; (downscaled to 480i (SDTV widescreen) on most over-the-air affiliates)

Ownership
- Owner: Weigel Broadcasting
- Parent: Me-TV National Limited Partnership
- Key people: Neal Sabin; (Vice Chairman, Weigel Broadcasting); Norman Shapiro; (President, Weigel Broadcasting)
- Sister channels: MeTV+; MeTV Toons; Movies!; Heroes & Icons; Catchy Comedy; Start TV; Story Television; WEST; Dabl

History
- Launched: January 6, 2003; 23 years ago; (as a programming block on WFBT-CA); January 1, 2005; 21 years ago; (as a programming format, in Chicago); March 1, 2008; 18 years ago; (as a Milwaukee subchannel on WDJT-TV); December 15, 2010; 15 years ago; (as a national network); MeTV+: May 15, 2021; 5 years ago; (as a national network)

Links
- Website: www.metv.com MeTV+

Availability

Terrestrial
- See: List of MeTV affiliates
- See: List of MeTV+ affiliates

Streaming media
- MeTV: Service(s): DirecTV Stream, Frndly TV, FuboTV, Philo, Sling, U-verse TV, Verizon Fios
- MeTV+: Service(s): Frndly TV, FuboTV, Philo

MeTV (acronym for Memorable Entertainment Television) is an American broadcast television network owned by Weigel Broadcasting. Marketed as "The Definitive Destination for Classic TV", the network airs a variety of classic television programs from the 1930s through the 1990s.

The concept began as a 1950s to 1980s programming block on Chicago's WFBT-CA in 2003, growing until becoming a national network in 2010. Since 2010, the network has spun off multiple sister networks: MeTV+, the action/adventure-oriented Heroes & Icons, the comedy-oriented Catchy Comedy, the film-centered Movies! (joint venture with Fox Television Stations), the drama-oriented Start TV (joint venture with CBS News and Stations), the history/documentary network Story Television, the classic cartoon-centric MeTV Toons (in partnership with Warner Bros. Discovery), and the western-oriented network WEST.

MeTV is carried on digital subchannels of affiliated television stations in most markets; however, some MeTV-affiliated stations carry the network as a primary affiliation on their main channel, and a small number of stations air select programs from the network along with their regular general entertainment schedules, with a few carrying the network in high definition. The network is also available nationwide on Dish Network, DirecTV and DirecTV Stream, on the C band satellite via SES-1 in the DVB-S2 format where it was free-to-air until being encrypted in December 2024, and in some markets on AT&T U-verse and Verizon FiOS and cable television through cable TV providers nationwide. As of March 28, 2022, MeTV is available on Frndly TV. As of August 9, 2022, MeTV is available on Philo. As of June 26, 2025, MeTV is available on FuboTV. MeTV's operations are located in Weigel Broadcasting's corporate headquarters on North Halsted Street in Chicago, Illinois.

== History ==
=== Chicago beginnings ===
MeTV was originally developed as a programming block that launched on January 6, 2003, on Class A television station WFBT-CA (channel 23) in Chicago, Illinois, an independent station owned by Weigel that otherwise maintained a format featuring programming aimed at the market's ethnic demographics. The block – which initially aired for three hours daily from 12:00 to 3:00 p.m., before expanding to seven hours a day (from 8:30 a.m. to 3:30 p.m.) by 2004 – featured a broad mix of series from the 1950s to the 1980s, which included among others The Honeymooners, I Love Lucy, Perry Mason, The Carol Burnett Show, One Day at a Time, and Hogan's Heroes; although the programs that aired as part of the lineup changed occasionally.

On January 1, 2005, Weigel rechristened the Chicago low-power station as WWME-CA and removed the ethnic-oriented programming that filled its late afternoon and nighttime schedule, adopting the MeTV format and on-air branding full-time. Channel 23's former ethnic programming and WFBT-CA call letters were transferred to its sister station on UHF channel 48, which used the W48DD call letters prior to the format change.

On August 4, 2007, WWME launched a weekend morning block that primarily featured Spanish dubs of select classic series, "Sí! MeTV" (the first two parts of the moniker were based on the phrase "see me", although "Sí" is the Spanish word for "yes"). Most of the programs carried as part of the "Sí! MeTV" lineup – which ran on the station until its discontinuation on January 25, 2009 – were sourced from the Universal Television library (including Hercules: The Legendary Journeys, Xena: Warrior Princess, Miami Vice, Quantum Leap, and The Incredible Hulk), with syndication restrictions imposed on the original English-language versions resulting in some of the programs being made available to the station only in Spanish.

Weigel expanded the format to its station on UHF channel 48 on March 1, 2008 – which adopted the WMEU-CA call letters at that time – under the "MeToo" extension brand, with the two low-power stations also being broadcast locally on separate digital subchannels of Weigel's flagship station WCIU-TV (channel 26). The two stations eventually carved out their own identities, culminating in a format shift on September 14, 2009, when WWME began to exclusively carry off-network sitcoms (such as I Love Lucy, Leave It to Beaver, The Andy Griffith Show, The Bernie Mac Show, All in the Family, The Honeymooners, and Frasier), while MeToo on WMEU began running only off-network drama series.

=== Milwaukee expansion ===
On March 1, 2008, Weigel expanded the MeTV format to Milwaukee, Wisconsin, where it began airing on the third digital subchannel of the group's CBS affiliate in that market, WDJT-TV (channel 58). The Milwaukee version of the service featured much of the same programming as that aired on the Chicago outlets (some of which aired in different timeslots than on WWME and WMEU), as well as certain programs that were exclusive to the Milwaukee service.

The following month on April 21, Weigel moved the MeTV programming to its dedicated full-powered channel – WJJA (channel 49) in Racine, a Jewelry Television-affiliated station that the group had recently purchased from Kinlow Broadcasting and had its call letters changed to WBME-TV on April 29. It later began transmitting the station's signal from a new digital transmitter on the Weigel tower in Milwaukee's Lincoln Park on October 20 of that year, after WBME officially transferred its operations into the West Allis studios of WDJT and sister stations WMLW-CA and WYTU-LP. MeTV continued to be carried on digital channel 58.3 until October 30, 2008, when it was replaced by newly launched sister network This TV on the same channel. The station also aired public affairs programming including Racine & Me, and because of its full-power status at the time of the move of MeTV programming to channel 49, programming compliant with FCC educational programming requirements such as Green Screen Adventures (a children's program produced for Weigel's Chicago flagship station WCIU-TV) and Saved by the Bell.

=== National expansion ===
On November 22, 2010, Weigel announced that it would take the MeTV concept national and turn it into a full-fledged network with a standardized schedule, available to any station that wished to affiliate. As a result, MeTV would compete fully with the Retro Television Network and the then yet-to-launch Antenna TV, while complementing successful then-sister network This TV, which carried library product from Metro-Goldwyn-Mayer (with a limited number of classic television series featured alongside its movie-dominated schedule) and – until Tribune Broadcasting took over Weigel's operational interest in This TV on November 1, 2013 – children's programming from the Canada-based Cookie Jar Entertainment (now WildBrain). The national MeTV network launched in December 2010. As with This TV, MGM handled distribution of the network to prospective affiliate stations.

As part of the standardization with the new network, Chicago's local version of MeTV was integrated with MeToo, combining a selection of comedy and drama programming that had respectively been featured on WWME and WMEU onto the latter station's schedule under the MeToo brand as a locally programmed service. In the Chicago market, the national MeTV is carried on WCIU subchannel 26.3 and WWME-CA (the latter of which serves as its flagship station, and through its ownership by Weigel, an owned-and-operated station of the network); the new MeToo moved to WCIU subchannel 26.4 and remained on WMEU-CA.

Low-powered WBME-CD in Milwaukee carries the national feed of MeTV in its entirety on digital channel 41.1; as a full-power station, prior to an August 2012 license swap that saw sister independent station WMLW move to full-power channel 49, while WBME moved to low-power channel 41 (the latter of which resulted in MeTV returning to its former secondary 58.2 slot to allow the latter to reach the entire market and to provide cable providers with a quality source of its signal), Weigel-owned ABC affiliate WBND-LD (channel 57) in South Bend began carrying MeTV on its 57.2 subchannel on December 15, 2010.

On April 1, 2013, Nielsen began to tabulate national viewership for MeTV, including the network in its prime time and total day ratings reports. In February 2016, the network began to transmit its master feed in 16:9 widescreen standard definition (which is also the preferred aspect ratio for sister networks Heroes & Icons and Decades), after conducting beta-testing in the format on WWME-CD months earlier. Although most affiliates continue to carry the MeTV feed in the 4:3 format due to technical considerations regarding transmission of their primary channel in high-definition and/or carriage of other subchannels, the switch to a widescreen feed was done mainly to accommodate national and local advertisers that produce commercials exclusively in the 16:9 format and prefer not to have their advertising letterboxed into a 4:3 presentation, and stations which carry newscasts and other local programming on their MeTV subchannels that prefer to present them in widescreen. With the conversion, MeTV also began to carry remastered widescreen prints of some programs (such as Leave It to Beaver, I Love Lucy, The Honeymooners, and The Monkees) and present its program promotions in the 16:9 format; most other programming to which MeTV has only obtained 4:3 prints are presented in an anamorphic 14:9 format. According to Nielsen, MeTV averaged 719,000 viewers in prime time for 2019, a 2% increase over 2018.

== Programming ==
MeTV's program schedule relies primarily on the extensive library of television programs that are currently owned by CBS Media Ventures, Warner Bros. Discovery, NBCUniversal and 20th Television (the latter now part of Disney–ABC Domestic Television), along with select programs from other distributors. The only original programs on MeTV are Svengoolie, a hosted movie series that had been airing on WCIU since 1994, Collector's Call, and cartoon-centered Toon In with Me. Similar to the former local MeTV and MeToo formats, the network maintains a broad variety of classic television programs, carrying approximately 60 program titles on its weekly schedule; the network's slate of programming is regularly altered at the start of its fall, winter and summer programming seasons, which respectively begin on Labor Day, New Year's Day and Memorial Day. Since MeTV broadcasts programs that it acquired through the syndication market, episodes of these shows are usually edited to fit into the allotted running time with commercials factored in.

The network does not air a split-screen credit sequence or feature voice-overs promoting upcoming network programming during the closing credits (borrowing a format standard in local broadcast syndication). The network's continuity announcers are staff members Richard Malmos and Carol Gallagher, who both do equal share of announcing duties. Carol Gallagher is a Chicago-based voice-over artist, who has served as MeTV's staff announcer since its existence as a local programming format on WWME-CA and WMEU-CA, prior to its establishment as a national network; longtime voice-over artist Richard Malmos, who has been the continuity announcer for Weigel's flagship station WCIU since December 1994 (and is also known as the continuity announcer for many stations owned by, among other groups, the Sinclair Broadcast Group).

Unlike other digital multicast networks such as former sister network This TV and competitors Antenna TV and Rewind TV, MeTV does not usually run day-long marathons of its programs on major national holidays. Instead, the network airs holiday-themed episodes of its shows on occasional holidays (such as Halloween, Thanksgiving and Christmas) as part of its regular schedule, which air in the program's normal time slot but are shown out-of-order from their regular episode rotation. Since its inception as a national network, MeTV has also aired marathons of The Doris Day Show on Christmas Eve as well as Christmas-themed specials during the month of December. In December 2014, the network aired Christmas episodes of its programs each weeknight from 10:00 to 11:00 p.m. Eastern Time, as part of the "MeTV Christmas Conundrum" stunt block, along with airing Christmas episodes of its programs from late Christmas Eve through Christmas night (this was repeated in 2015, albeit in an earlier prime time slot, featuring Christmas-themed episodes of series feature on the network's schedule and other shows from its program distributors that were not part of the regular lineup).

The network occasionally pays tribute to a recently deceased actor or actress with a marathon showcasing episodes of their past television roles (either those that the performer had starred in as a regular or appeared as a guest star) to which MeTV has access to broadcast through its distributors, pre-empting episodes originally scheduled to air that day; however, these have aired in a significantly decreased usage since the discontinuance of the "MeTV Sunday Showcase" block in September 2012.

MeTV premiered its first original series since the introduction of Svengoolie, a reality show called Collector's Call, in 2019, later with more original series in 2021, Toon In with Me and in 2022, Sventoonie.

=== Current lineup ===
The network's schedule is a mix of programming ranging from the 1930s to the 2000s.

Weekdays feature Toon In with Me (mornings), crime/legal dramas (late mornings), westerns (afternoons), sitcoms (evenings through prime time), a black and white noir block late nights and detective/police procedural series overnights/early mornings.

On Saturday, there are blocks of cartoons (mornings), westerns (afternoons), The Three Stooges (early evenings), Svengoolie (prime time), and sci-fi/superhero programs late evenings through the overnight hours.

On Sundays MeTV airs a three-hour block of classic episodes of Mutual of Omaha's Wild Kingdom to fulfill FCC mandated E/I obligations early mornings, with the rest of the day primarily dedicated to sitcoms, featuring lighthearted "family" shows airing late mornings/middays, and more adult oriented programs through the evening. Sci-fi and crime dramas air overnights/early mornings.

=== Movies ===
Despite access to program content from the Universal Television, CBS Media Ventures and 20th Century Fox libraries, movies have a relatively limited presence on MeTV's weekly schedule. The network airs the Rich Koz-hosted horror and sci-fi film showcase Svengoolie, which is syndicated by sister CW-affiliate station WCIU-TV, on Saturday evenings.

From September 2013 to January 2014, MeTV aired a prime-time film block on Friday evenings, "The MeTV Made for TV Movie", which showcased made-for-television films from the 1970s to the 1990s. Until September 2013, the network also aired Laurel and Hardy movies and shorts Sunday mornings.

MeTV's weekly showing of Columbo on Sunday nights had been the only program that appeared regularly in any feature length form. For a brief period in the 2010s, MeTV aired reruns of several NBC Mystery Movie series (including Columbo) as part of a daily late night block called "The MeTV Mystery Movie". Columbo departed the network on November 21, 2021. From 2022 to 2023, MeTV aired Perry Mason TV movies from the 1980s/90s on Sunday nights until the program left the schedule in early February.

=== Seasonal ===
- The Summer of Me – A seasonal schedule of programming that runs annually from Memorial Day until Labor Day.
- Spooky Sunday Block Party – A programming block of Halloween-themed episodes that runs annually on Sundays in October.
- A Very Merry Sunday Block Party – A programming block of Christmas-themed episodes that runs annually on Sundays in December.

=== Morning programming blocks ===
==== Former ====
In order to comply with educational programming requirements mandated by the Federal Communications Commission's Children's Television Act on behalf of the network's affiliates, MeTV carried an hour-long block of Green Screen Adventures (Weigel's Chicago-based program originally meant for local viewing) on Saturday mornings and a two-hour block of the teen sitcom Saved by the Bell (which has long been used to meet E/I – or educational and informative – requirements, including by the original Chicago MeTV on WWME-CA prior to the national network's launch, and the TNBC block it formerly anchored) on Sunday mornings.

In September 2013, MeTV began customizing its weekend morning lineup in order to allow its affiliates to choose between running both Saturday and Sunday E/I blocks, or running the children's lineup on one weekend day and a three-hour block of classic series in place of the children's programs on the other, allowing stations to fulfill educational programming quotas by running the minimum three-hour requirement or an overall total of six hours of E/I content (this was reconfigured in January 2015 to allow stations the option of pre-empting the last two hours of the Saturday E/I block to carry only Green Screen Adventures and Saved by the Bell to reach their weekly E/I requirements). The network moved its children's programming to Sunday mornings in October 2016 for more classic television programming on Saturday morning including The Little Rascals and three additional hours of westerns. Starting on October 2, MeTV’s educational/informational block on Sunday mornings was overhauled with the addition of Beakman’s World and Bill Nye the Science Guy, the latter acquired from Disney-ABC Home Entertainment and Television Distribution. Saved by the Bell also continued to air on the station on Sunday mornings up to June 29, 2025.

MeTV also previously ran a children's program block on Saturday mornings called "AniMeTV" (which despite how the name – due to the network's use of the "Me" moniker as a branding avenue for its blocks – makes it appear, aired no Japanese-originated anime programming), that was handled by New York-based Classic Media (which, along with NBCUniversal, Nelvana and Scholastic Entertainment, previously co-owned the now-defunct digital multicast network Qubo in conjunction with Ion Media Networks, later acquired by The E. W. Scripps Company in 2021). The three-hour block premiered on April 7, 2012, to compete with The CW's Toonzai and This TV's Cookie Jar Toons/This Is for Kids. The block featured animated series such as He-Man and the Masters of the Universe and She-Ra: Princess of Power, along with Gumby and Mr. Magoo animated shorts; the block officially ended on October 6, 2012, rendering Vortexx (which replaced Toonzai in 2012) and Cookie Jar Toons/This Is for Kids as the only children's blocks on a broadcast network without a strictly-E/I lineup. MeTV began airing the cult classic Sid & Marty Krofft productions H.R. Pufnstuf and Land of the Lost during the 2013 Christmas season; the shows became part of the regular Saturday morning lineup on December 28, 2013, as part of an hour-long block called "Sid & Marty Krofft and Me".

==== Current ====
Toon In With Me – a block of classic cartoons and original skits, airing for one hour on weekday mornings – premiered on January 4, 2021, and a three-hour block of classic cartoons airs Saturday mornings under the branding of Saturday Morning Cartoons. Its companion network, MeTV+, previously aired a three-hour block of classic cartoons Sunday nights under the branding of Sunday Night Cartoons, as well as Toon In With Me weeknights, until MeTV Toons was launched.

== Affiliates ==
As of November 2017, MeTV has current or pending affiliation agreements with 203 television stations in over 185 television markets encompassing all 50 states, the District of Columbia, and the border regions of Canada, covering approximately 92.54% of the United States; this makes MeTV the largest subchannel network by population reach percentage (a distinction once held by former sister network This TV), and the seventh largest commercial broadcast television network in the U.S.-based on total number of affiliates. Of these affiliates, 24 stations carry the network as a formal primary channel affiliation and two are general entertainment stations that air select MeTV programs on a tape-delayed basis. In almost all of its affiliation agreements, the network's channel slot is mandatorily required to be slotted on either a station's primary channel, or its secondary digital subchannel; in San Diego, this stipulation required the move of MeTV from CBS affiliate KFMB-TV's second subchannel, to ABC affiliate KGTV's second subchannel upon KFMB's launch of a subchannel for The CW to replace XETV-TDT's affiliation.

Like former sister network This TV, many of MeTV's affiliates (some of which replaced This TV with MeTV, after the former was partially acquired by Tribune Broadcasting) include regional descriptors reflecting the station's primary broadcast area underneath the logo bug displayed during the network's programming (these descriptors are also used in the customized station identifications shown at the top of each hour between programs or during commercial breaks, which differ from the silent lower third in-program IDs seen on This TV). Some stations either display customized logos using adapted versions of their current logo with the subchannel number below the main MeTV logo bug (such as WPXI in Pittsburgh) or in order to fit in with the network's "retro" format, a logo formerly used by the station (such as WHIO-TV in Dayton). Others display their callsign and city of license (and in some cases, the affiliate's virtual channel number) below the MeTV bug full-time in case the full-screen ID sequence malfunctions in some manner. From August 2014 to August 2015, station identifications for MeTV were based on the motif "Thank You for Making Us America's #1 All Classic TV Network", allowing local affiliates to customize their IDs to refer to their individual viewing area (for example, "Thank You, Chicago" on WWME-CD).

Although MeTV prefers that its local affiliates carry the entire schedule, some affiliates regularly pre-empt certain network programs in order to air morning and/or prime time newscasts produced by the station specifically for the subchannel or public affairs programs (such as with WLKY-TV in Louisville and WBAL-TV in Baltimore); this has become particularly more common since September 2015, when other Hearst Television-owned stations in markets where the group does not maintain a duopoly (as is the case with WBAL and WLKY, which launched theirs earlier) gradually began launching prime time newscasts on their MeTV-affiliated subchannels. Some of the major network affiliates that carry MeTV full-time (such as WBAL, WLKY and WCVB-TV in Boston) use the affiliated subchannel as a buffer during network sports coverage, breaking news or severe weather coverage situations to carry regularly scheduled network and/or syndicated programming seen on its main channel.

Some affiliates may also preempt select MeTV programs to air infomercials (such as with WZME in Bridgeport, Connecticut pre-2021, which pre-empted much of the network's morning and late night schedule with paid programming), locally acquired syndicated programming (such as with WJLA-TV in Washington, D.C., which aired events from the American Sports Network, a syndicated college sports distributor owned by WJLA parent Sinclair Broadcast Group, over its former MeTV subchannel on some weekends), local live sporting events (such as WTOV-TV in Wheeling, WV-Steubenville, OH which has pre-empted the schedule for Wheeling Nailers ECHL hockey game broadcasts and local high school sporting events), or in some cases, because the local syndication rights to a particular program are held by a station other than the MeTV affiliate (such as with The Andy Griffith Show, which since the network began airing the program in September 2014, is substituted in many markets with an alternate feed of its spin-off Mayberry R.F.D.). To address these variances, MeTV includes the fine print notation "On most MeTV stations" at the end of its program promotions regardless of whether a program or block is specifically promoted, typically during the timeslot card. Additionally, stations may also air select MeTV programs that are recorded in advance on their main channels in order to fill unprogrammed time slots or for use as a backup source of programming in the event that a network-televised sports event is delayed or postponed due to inclement weather as well as during the Christmas season to provide supplementary holiday-themed programming.

Two of MeTV's subchannel-only affiliates – WBBJ-TV in Jackson, Tennessee (which primarily affiliates its 7.3 subchannel with CBS) and WIBW-TV in Topeka, Kansas (which primarily affiliates its 13.2 subchannel with MyNetworkTV) – carry its programming on a secondary basis while nominally serving as an affiliate of a major broadcast network due to the lack of enough available stations in their markets for a standalone main channel affiliation (though despite the 'secondary' status, these stations still carry the majority of MeTV's broadcast schedule). One other affiliate, WBBZ-TV in Springville, New York (which serves the Buffalo market), operates as an independent station carrying the network's programming part-time within its main channel's regular schedule, while running the full MeTV network feed on a separate subchannel. Over time however, MeTV's ratings strength and popularity have actually caused some of these split situations to end, with MeTV going full-time on two affiliates, Charlottesville, Virginia's WAHU-CD2 and Paducah, Kentucky's WQWQ-LD at the start of 2019 and 2020, ending their runs as MeTV affiliates carrying MyNetworkTV and CW programming under secondary affiliation agreements.

On January 7, 2011, KCTU-LD in Wichita, Kansas became the first television station not owned by Weigel to carry the MeTV network. However, KCTU's affiliation with the network lasted only about one week, as that station's owner, Great Plains Television Network LLC, and Weigel could not come to terms on a long-term affiliation contract. Afterwards, on September 7, 2012, another Wichita station (KAKE) became the Wichita MeTV affiliate, and is still around to this date. In early 2011, Bahakel Communications became the first non-Weigel station group to sign selected stations to carry MeTV on their digital subchannels, with its stations in Charlotte, North Carolina (WCCB) and Columbia, South Carolina (WOLO-TV) adding the network in early March of that year. On April 4, 2011, Weigel announced affiliation agreements for MeTV with 14 broadcasting companies, most notably Hearst Television, Hubbard Broadcasting, Graham Media Group, Nexstar Media Group, Gray Television, Cox Media Group, and Tegna Inc. Also of note, in December 2013, the network moved its Dallas-Fort Worth affiliation to a newly created subchannel of independent station KTXA (replacing Greenville-based KTXD-TV, which abruptly disaffiliated from MeTV three months earlier), marking CBS Television Stations' first affiliation deal involving a major subchannel network (Weigel and CBS would later partner to create Decades, a similar classic television-focused network that launched on May 25, 2015). On August 31, 2022, 12 affiliates owned by Sinclair Broadcast Group and 4 affiliates owned by the E. W. Scripps Company dropped their affiliation with MeTV.

== Related services ==
=== MeToo (WMEU-CD/WCIU-DT2) ===
MeToo was a companion programming format, which launched on March 1, 2008, on WMEU-CA in Chicago as an extension of the local MeTV format on sister station WWME-CA. It initially maintained a wide selection of off-network sitcoms and drama series from a variety of distributors (similar to WWME's locally exclusive MeTV format, but differing from the limited distributor output of the present-day national MeTV network). Initially, WMEU maintained a similar programming schedule as WWME; however by the fall of 2008, their formats were modified to feature one station focusing mainly on sitcoms and the other largely focusing on dramas. When WWME adopted a sitcom-intensive format for its MeTV schedule on September 14, 2009, the MeToo schedule on WMEU-CA was similarly streamlined to feature only off-network dramatic programs (such as Perry Mason, Star Trek, Star Trek: The Next Generation, The Rockford Files and The Twilight Zone) and films.

As WWME became a charter station of the national network on December 15, 2010, WMEU concurrently reverted to a general entertainment format – combining some of its existing inventory of drama programming with a selection of comedy programs aired by WWME prior to MeTV's format-to-network conversion; however it continued to carry a mix of both classic and recent programs, resulting in the local MeToo channel airing a broader variety of programming than that provided by the national version of MeTV, which largely restricts its acquired programming to series that debuted prior to 1985. The MeToo format was relegated to WWME's analog signal and WCIU digital subchannel 26.4 on November 1, 2013, when WMEU was converted into a standalone extension of WCIU's "The U Too" subchannel, itself an extension of the general entertainment independent station format carried by that station's primary channel, albeit with some classic series remaining on the schedule. The MeToo format was discontinued outright on December 29, 2014, when it was replaced on WCIU-DT4 by Weigel's new male-targeted classic television network Heroes & Icons.

Weigel Broadcasting had planned to expand the MeToo format to Milwaukee, intending to launch a similar locally programmed subchannel on WBME-TV in early 2011. However, these plans were delayed and ultimately scuttled due to the launch of sister network Movies! on May 27, 2013, which took the 49.3 channel slot that had been proposed to carry the Milwaukee MeToo service. After Movies! moved to a newly created second digital subchannel of ABC affiliate WISN-TV (channel 12) in August 2014, WMLW-DT3 became a charter affiliate of Heroes & Icons.

=== MeTV FM ===
Through a local marketing agreement with owner Venture Technologies Group, Weigel operates WRME-LD (channel 6) in Chicago as a co-branded radio station, known as "MeTV FM", which maintains an oldies format focusing on classic music from the 1950s to the 1980s. The format change, announced on February 9, 2015, and formally commencing on February 23, coincided with Weigel's assumption of an LMA first formed in April 2012 between Venture Technologies and Merlin Media (the LMA was transferred from Cumulus Media to Tribune Broadcasting – which had operated it as a sports talk station – in February 2014, before switching to an FM simulcast of sister station 720 WGN in December of that year).

WRME-LD is licensed as a low-power television station, but operates as a radio station due to a technical anomaly with the analog VHF channel 6 frequency for television transmissions that allows the audio feed of such stations to be heard on 87.75 MHz on the FM band (with a visual station identification slide used on the station's television broadcasts to fulfill FCC licensing requirements).

In May 2017, it was announced that Weigel had partnered with Envision Networks, now Sun Broadcast Group, to syndicate the MeTV FM brand and format as a radio network, with Weigel handling programming and Envision handling distribution. The company cited the success of the original station (which, by then, was tied for audience share with its closest full-power competitors WJMK and WLS-FM, and by March 2018, was the 6th highest-rated station in the market), as well as the possibility of cross-promotional opportunities with MeTV television affiliates. In April 2018, Northern States Broadcasting, which just acquired purchased WHHQ AM in Bridgeport, Michigan (serving the Saginaw-Bay City-Midland radio market), affiliated with MeTV FM at its relaunch as WJMK, using the call sign vacated by one of MeTV FM's Chicago competitors, which had changed its call sign to WBMX.

==== Affiliates ====
- WRME-LD 87.7, Chicago, Illinois
- WJMK (AM) 1250 AM, Bridgeport, Michigan (market of Saginaw, Midland, and Bay City, Michigan); April 2018
- WMYX-FM HD2, Milwaukee, Wisconsin; August 2018
- WXZO 96.7 FM, Willsboro, New York (market of Champlain Valley of Vermont and New York); January 11, 2019
- WGTO 910 AM, Cassopolis, Michigan; July 2020
- WMEX (AM) 1510 AM, Quincy/Boston, Massachusetts; 2020
- WMEE HD4, Fort Wayne, Indiana; November 2021
- WTUG-FM HD3, Tuscaloosa, Alabama; February 2022
- KVOL 1330 AM/97.7 FM, Lafayette, Louisiana; March 2022
- KMEE 103.1, Thermal, California; August 2026
- KGGM 93.9, Monroe, Louisiana; July 2023
- WOCO-FM 107.1 Oconto Wisconsin; 2023

=== MeTV+ ===
The MeTV+ logo since its launch in 2021.

On May 3, 2021, it was announced that Weigel would launch MeTV Plus (MeTV+), a new 24/7 digital network that extends the brand and expands the audience of MeTV. The new channel launched on Saturday, May 15 on WCIU-TV 26.5 Chicago, Illinois and KMEE-TV 6.2 Kingman, Arizona, later spreading to other Weigel stations. In September 2021, MeTV+ expanded their carriage beyond the two stations. Frndly TV and Philo TV added MeTV+ to their lineups in October 2023. FuboTV added MeTV+ to its lineup in June 2025.

==== Programming blocks ====
MeTV+ arranges the bulk of its lineup in organized genre-based programming blocks, most of which use the "Me" moniker (in some cases, as an intentional pun) for brand unification purposes.

===== Current MeTV+ blocks =====
- Weekday dramas – Consists of TV drama programs such as Police Woman, Hardcastle and McCormick, T.J. Hooker, The Mod Squad, and Diagnosis Murder.
- Comedy Classics – Introduced on May 17, 2021, as the weeknight block of comedy shorts featuring The Three Stooges, Laurel and Hardy, and Our Gang.
- Saturday daytime sitcoms – This block features shows that currently air on the original MeTV as well as others that don't such as Love, American Style, That Girl, and ALF.
- Sunday dramas – The weekly block features shows such as Family, Twin Peaks, Father Dowling Mysteries, and Dark Shadows.

===== Former MeTV+ blocks =====
- Toon In with Me – Introduced on May 17, 2021, as the branding for the network's one-hour morning block of classic cartoons and original skits, usually a repeat of the show aired earlier the same day on the main MeTV network. Episodes on MeTV+ were dropped after the launch of MeTV Toons in June 2024.
- Sunday Night Cartoons – Introduced on May 16, 2021, as the branding for MeTV+'s weekly three-hour cartoon block on Sundays, complementing Toon In with Me on weekdays. This block was dropped after the launch of MeTV Toons in June 2024.
- Western series – Aired Monday - Saturday evenings and all day Sunday, featured shows such as Gunsmoke, The Big Valley, and Guns of Paradise. All Westerns were removed from the MeTV+ schedule on August 18, 2025, with the launch of WEST.

==== Affiliates ====
Partial list of MeTV+ affiliates.

- Streaming service Frndly TV
- Streaming service FuboTV
- Streaming service Philo
- WMEU-CD 48.4, Chicago, Illinois; March 2022
- KMEE-TV 6.2, Kingman, Arizona; May 2021
- KCSG 8.5, Cedar City, Utah; September 2021
- WCWW-LD 25.4, South Bend, Indiana; September 2021
- KFFV 44.5, Seattle, Washington; September 2021
- KVOS-TV 12.6, Bellingham, Washington; September 2021
- KHTV-CD 6.1, Los Angeles, California; September 2021
- KTLN-TV 68.4, Palo Alto/San Francisco, California; September 2021
- WZME 43.2, Bridgeport, Connecticut/New York; March 2022
- WJFB 44.6, Lebanon/Nashville, Tennessee; September 2021
- KYAZ 51.2, Katy/Houston, Texas; September 2021
- WHCT-LD 35.6, Hartford, Connecticut; October 2021
- WJLP 33.8, Middletown, New Jersey/New York; March 2022
- WDME-CD 48.4, Washington, D.C.; May 2022
- WYTU-LD 63.3, Milwaukee, Wisconsin; June 2024
- KAZD 55.4, Lake Dallas/Dallas, Texas; November 2021
- KNLC 24.10, St. Louis, Missouri; February 2022
- KMEE-LD 40.2, Phoenix, Arizona; January 2023
- KREG-TV 3.6, Glenwood Springs/Denver, Colorado; March 2022
- WMEI 31.4, Green Bay/Shawano, Wisconsin; June 2024
- KBWT 9.6, Tonopah/Las Vegas, Nevada; June 2026

=== MeTV Toons ===
On May 1, 2024, Weigel announced that it would be partnering with Warner Bros. Discovery to launch MeTV Toons, a 24/7 free-to-air television network dedicated to broadcasting classic animation programming, on June 25, 2024.
