= WDJT-TV =

Television station in Milwaukee

- Milwaukee, Wisconsin; United States
- Channels: Digital: 29 (UHF); Virtual: 58
- Branding: CBS 58; CBS 58 News Milwaukee

Programming
- Affiliations: 58.1: CBS; for others, see § Technical information and subchannels

Ownership
- Owner: Weigel Broadcasting; (WDJT-TV Limited Partnership)
- Sister stations: WBME-CD, WMLW-TV, WYTU-LD

History
- First air date: November 10, 1988
- Former channel numbers: Analog: 58 (UHF, 1988–2009); Digital: 46 (UHF, until 2019)
- Former affiliations: Independent (1988–1994)
- Call sign meaning: Original permit holders Debra Jackson and John Torres

Technical information
- Licensing authority: FCC
- Facility ID: 71427
- ERP: 1,000 kW
- HAAT: 351 m (1,152 ft)
- Transmitter coordinates: 43°6′42″N 87°55′50″W

Links
- Public license information: Public file; LMS
- Website: www.cbs58.com

WDJT-TV (channel 58) is a television station in Milwaukee, Wisconsin, United States, affiliated with CBS. It is owned by Weigel Broadcasting alongside three other stations in southeastern Wisconsin: independent station WMLW-TV (channel 49), MeTV station WBME-CD (channel 41), and Telemundo affiliate WYTU-LD (channel 63). The stations share studios in the Renaissance Center office complex on South 60th Street in West Allis; WDJT-TV's transmitter is located in Milwaukee's Lincoln Park.

Channel 58 went on the air in November 1988 as a lower-tier independent station subsisting on classic reruns and movies, as well as programs not aired by Milwaukee's network affiliates. The construction permit had originally been awarded to a company owned by two minority stockholders, whose initials are preserved in the station's call letters. However, the terminal illness of one of the partners created funding problems only solved when the surviving partner sold controlling interest to Weigel, who eventually became sole owner. WDJT-TV gradually increased its profile in the market over the course of the early 1990s, notably by carrying gavel-to-gavel coverage of the murder trial of Jeffrey Dahmer.

In 1994, Milwaukee's then-CBS affiliate, WITI, announced it would switch to Fox. This decision led to an especially lengthy search by CBS for a new affiliate in Milwaukee. The other Milwaukee independents and WDJT-TV alike initially rebuffed the network's overtures, leaving CBS scrambling for a new affiliate with only weeks before WITI was due to join Fox. Channel 58 finally committed to becoming a CBS affiliate just six days before joining the network on December 11, 1994. Over the next two years, WDJT-TV started a local news operation—which has since expanded to provide news programming for two additional Weigel stations in the market and throughout the day—and built a new transmitter tower to provide a full-market signal, which it had previously lacked. The station has since helped Weigel launch new national digital multicast networks.

== History ==
=== Launch and early struggles ===
In 1983, Harry C. Powell Jr., a Florida man, successfully petitioned the Federal Communications Commission (FCC) to add a new allocation for ultra high frequency (UHF) channel 58 in Milwaukee. Powell stated that he intended to apply for a license with the help of a Knoxville, Tennessee, consulting firm if the commission approved. With channel 58 now allocated to Milwaukee, the commission took applications for the station, ending with a 13-party field which included Powell, five applicants residing in Knoxville, and several groups consisting of local investors. One of these groups included then-state senator Gary George. This field thinned quickly to six applicants and then to two in October. In March 1985, the FCC rejected another applicant and issued a decision in favor of TV 58 Limited, a minority-owned firm headed by Debra M. Jackson and Milwaukee media veteran John Torres, who had worked for multiple radio stations and local Spanish-language newspaper La Guardia. Debra Jackson originally suggested naming the station WJMT—Torres's initials—but the designation was not available, thus the selection of WDJT-TV, combining both their initials.

TV 58 Limited faced financial trouble from the start when it agreed to pay out settlements to other applicants, including George, in exchange for them withdrawing their applications. A new burden surfaced when Jackson was diagnosed with a terminal illness—dying in January 1987—and the lenders that had originally committed interim financing backed out of their deals. In February 1986, one of the applicants with which TV 58 Limited had settled forced the company into involuntary bankruptcy. The Carley Capital Group of Madison negotiated to provide funding to keep the business afloat, but it withdrew by early August, and a new company entered the picture: Weigel Broadcasting, the Chicago-based owner of WCIU-TV in that city. Torres agreed to sell controlling interest in the station to Weigel, while the call letters were retained.

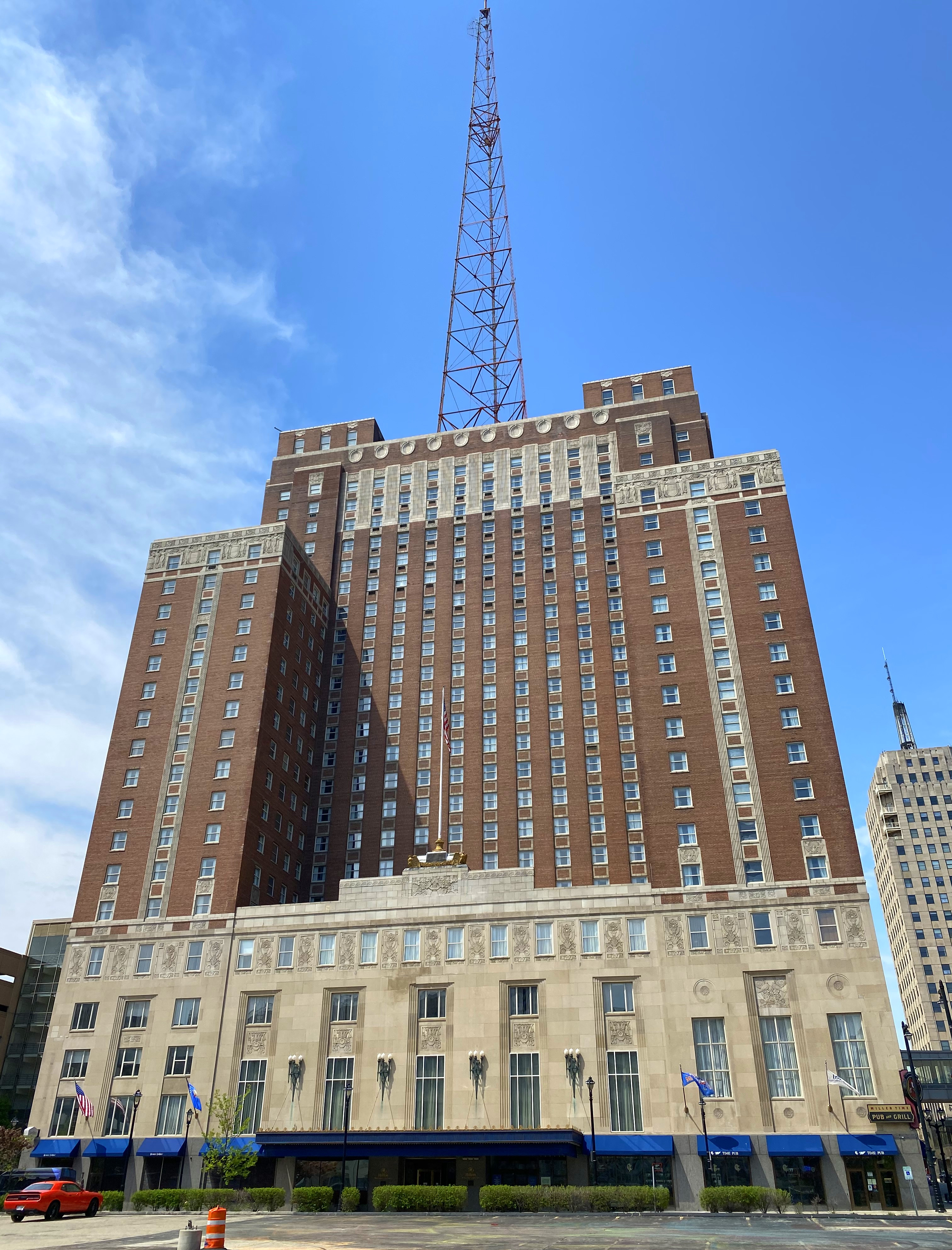
WDJT-TV signed on from studios and transmitter in the Marc Plaza Hotel downtown.

Weigel, in association with Torres, spent the next two years trying to put WDJT-TV on the air. Weigel proposed construction of facilities in various suburbs, including Glendale, where it was rebuffed twice in two years, and Germantown, where the village rejected Weigel's plans. Objections to the proposed 1,000-foot (300 m) tower called it unsightly. To get the station on the air, Weigel instead decided to locate at a downtown site with a lengthy history of television in the city: the Marc Plaza Hotel. The antenna on the original mast atop the building—first used as a transmitting site by early UHF station WCAN-TV in 1953 and at the time utilized by low-power outlet W08BY—was replaced in October in preparation for the station's launch.

After a $2.3 million expenditure, WDJT-TV began broadcasting on November 10, 1988. Known as "Classic 58", it presented a mix of older sitcoms and movies with a family orientation, a programming philosophy favored by Torres. The next year, Weigel also launched W46AR, a low-power station carrying Univision, giving it three signals in the area along with a preexisting WCIU translator, W65BT, and WDJT-TV. The station also resurrected The Bowling Game, a bowling program that had previously enjoyed an 11-year run on established Milwaukee independent WVTV (channel 18) and continued on channel 58 until 1993.

At the station's launch, Torres served as the vice president of operations; he later sued Weigel for forcing him out of the company by having him sell to an affiliated company, a case that resulted in an out-of-court settlement. A Delaware court ruled in favor of Torres in a case involving undervaluation of his stock in the partnership in 1993.

The station's programming of syndicated shows and movies was bolstered by a variety of network programs preempted by the networks' Milwaukee affiliates; in late 1990, WDJT-TV was airing America Tonight from CBS, Loving and Match Game from ABC, and four shows from NBC. In 1992, WDJT-TV put itself on the map by teaming up with WITI, then the CBS affiliate in Milwaukee, to air nonstop coverage during the trial of Jeffrey Dahmer, a serial killer from Milwaukee, thus making it available to non-cable homes in the Milwaukee area and allowing WITI to air its normal programming. The trial coverage was credited by station management with making people aware that there was even a station on channel 58 in the first place; at times during the weeks-long trial, 15 to 20 percent of Milwaukee TV homes were tuned to WDJT-TV, and it also was added to at least one cable system as a result at a time when must-carry rules were not in effect. Local programming efforts included the first locally produced children's TV program in Milwaukee in decades: SeaToons with Captain Al Gee, which presented segments between cartoons weekday mornings but lasted only eight weeks.

With its limited presence, WDJT-TV was barely mentioned in the same breath as its more established competitors, independent WVTV and Fox affiliate WCGV-TV (channel 24). For example, a 1992 feature in The Milwaukee Journal on independent television programming in Milwaukee (at the time, WCGV, like other early Fox affiliates, was still considered an independent) consigned channel 58 to one lone mention. Its signal was only a fraction of those of channels 18 and 24; the Marc Plaza transmitter effectively limited channel 58's coverage area to Milwaukee itself and its inner-ring suburbs. On cable systems, it was on high channel positions, including channel 29 in Milwaukee and channel 48 on Warner Cable systems in suburban areas.

=== CBS courtship ===
On May 23, 1994, Fox announced an agreement with New World Communications in which most of New World's stations would become affiliates of that network. Among those due to switch affiliations was Milwaukee's WITI. The deal, which triggered a years-long realignment process in cities nationwide, left CBS needing a new affiliate in the Milwaukee market. It approached NBC affiliate WTMJ-TV and ABC affiliate WISN-TV (which had previously carried CBS from 1961 to 1977), but each renewed their existing contracts. This left three commercial independent or soon-to-be-independent stations operating in Milwaukee as potential CBS affiliates: WVTV, WCGV-TV (about to lose Fox), and WDJT-TV.

The year before, Gaylord Broadcasting, owner of WVTV, had signed a local marketing agreement to allow WCGV-TV, then owned by ABRY Communications, to handle its programming functions. WCGV-TV moved into WVTV's building, from which it had produced a 9 p.m. local newscast until 1993. The week the New World deal was announced, however, Sinclair Broadcast Group of Baltimore closed on its previously agreed purchase of WCGV-TV. Though this would normally have made WCGV-TV a frontrunner to be the CBS affiliate, Sinclair owned no major network affiliates at the time but three Fox affiliates and two independents. CBS had an hourlong conversation with Sinclair representatives in early June, but Sinclair president David D. Smith repeatedly stated his lack of interest in aligning his station with the network; this stance was reaffirmed in early October.

Sinclair's lack of interest in the available CBS affiliation left one other viable partner—WDJT-TV—but CBS first made a longshot attempt to purchase another local station. It offered to buy Christian television station WVCY-TV, owned by Wisconsin Voice of Christian Youth, for $10 million to convert it into its new Milwaukee affiliate. However, VCY turned the offer down. Founder and chairman Vic Eliason said that even without CBS's offer being "unreasonably low", a sale to a mainstream network would have been a hypocritical "act of consummate irresponsibility".

By the end of September, talks with WDJT-TV had also broken down. On September 30, Weigel announced it would no longer pursue a CBS affiliation, saying it could not wait any further to firm up the station's future direction. Weigel president Howard Shapiro noted that the station had already entered into preliminary conversations about picking up Milwaukee Brewers baseball games and planned to implement promotional and program purchasing strategies for its existing independent lineup. It was also starting the process of fixing its comparatively weak transmitting facility by conducting a site search; it had asked to share space on WISN-TV's tower and was rebuffed. However, ownership and management did not completely rule out the possibility of CBS affiliating with WDJT-TV; Shapiro noted that "nothing is irretrievable". Even as the station inquired about affiliating with The WB, general manager Bill Le Monds stated on October 7, "You never turn off anything." The station also stepped in to carry Late Show with David Letterman, which WITI had not aired live since its debut and which WCGV-TV had been airing.

By the start of November, Milwaukee was the only market affected by the New World-Fox deal that had not secured a replacement CBS affiliate. Even though CBS had been forced to buy a second-tier station in Detroit and nearly had to do so in Atlanta to replace a New World-owned station, the network was at least assured of having affiliates in those cities once the outgoing affiliates switched to Fox. Tony Malara, head of affiliate relations for CBS, noted that time was becoming of the essence with WITI due to switch to Fox on December 11. Of Milwaukee, he said, "It certainly isn't a market where we have a plethora of choices. But the fact of the matter is that it's not necessarily the quantity, but who's available to do what and what kind of agreement, what kind of relationship can you establish?" With just two weeks to go before WITI was due to switch to Fox, the possibility increased that there might not be any CBS affiliate at all in Milwaukee. CBS was prepared to have Milwaukee cable systems pipe in nearby CBS-owned stations, WBBM-TV in Chicago and WFRV-TV in Green Bay, as a stopgap.

On November 28, Howard Shapiro met for the first time with Malara in New York City. On December 6, Shapiro and Malara jointly announced that WDJT-TV would join CBS on December 11—five days later. Weigel persuaded CBS to agree to a 10-year affiliation agreement, believing it needed time to build out channel 58 to a level commensurate with a major-network affiliate. The deal came as a relief even at WITI, where officials were waiting for a replacement CBS affiliate to be announced to help guide viewers to relocated programs through both a station helpline and print advertising. The deal also saw more CBS programs being aired in Milwaukee, as WDJT-TV agreed to clear the entire CBS schedule in pattern; for instance, WITI had not aired CBS This Morning for months and preempted Face the Nation. Some 30 percent of the station's syndicated program inventory was displaced by CBS network programming, with some shows moving to W65BT (now WBME-CD on channel 41) and others to overnight time slots. As many expected with any move of CBS off VHF in Milwaukee, the network's ratings did fall precipitously. In January 1995, the CBS Evening News drew a 1.4 rating and 3 percent share of the audience, a far cry from the 9.9 rating and 17 share in January 1994 on WITI.

=== Rebuilding for the CBS age ===
Even [seven months after the switch], it's disorienting. It's like the sun rising in the West ... CBS being at the wrong end of the dial is still a little jarring.

— Joanne Weintraub, television critic, Milwaukee Journal Sentinel, to Ed Bark of The Dallas Morning News on the effect of CBS moving to channel 58

While WDJT-TV signed with CBS in time to ensure the continued over-the-air availability of CBS programming in Milwaukee, much work was needed to upgrade the station to a level befitting its new status. Its transmitter was nowhere near adequate enough to reach the entire market, and its studios did not approach the scope of a full-service network affiliate that projected to hire 60 additional people. In late December 1994, the station wrote to Milwaukee County officials suggesting three county parks as locations for a new 1,200-foot (370 m) transmission tower. WISN objected, claiming that the close proximity of WDJT-TV's proposed mast to its own facility would cause engineering and safety issues. A judge issued a preliminary injunction that upheld WISN's arguments, claiming a second tower would violate channel 12's land use agreement with Milwaukee County. Several nearby residents also objected, concerned about environmental impacts to the park. Despite these objections, the FCC dismissed WISN's petition to deny and approved the tower site in May 1996, finding that WISN was unable to prove there would be new interference and that the concerns of neighbors did not justify a denial.

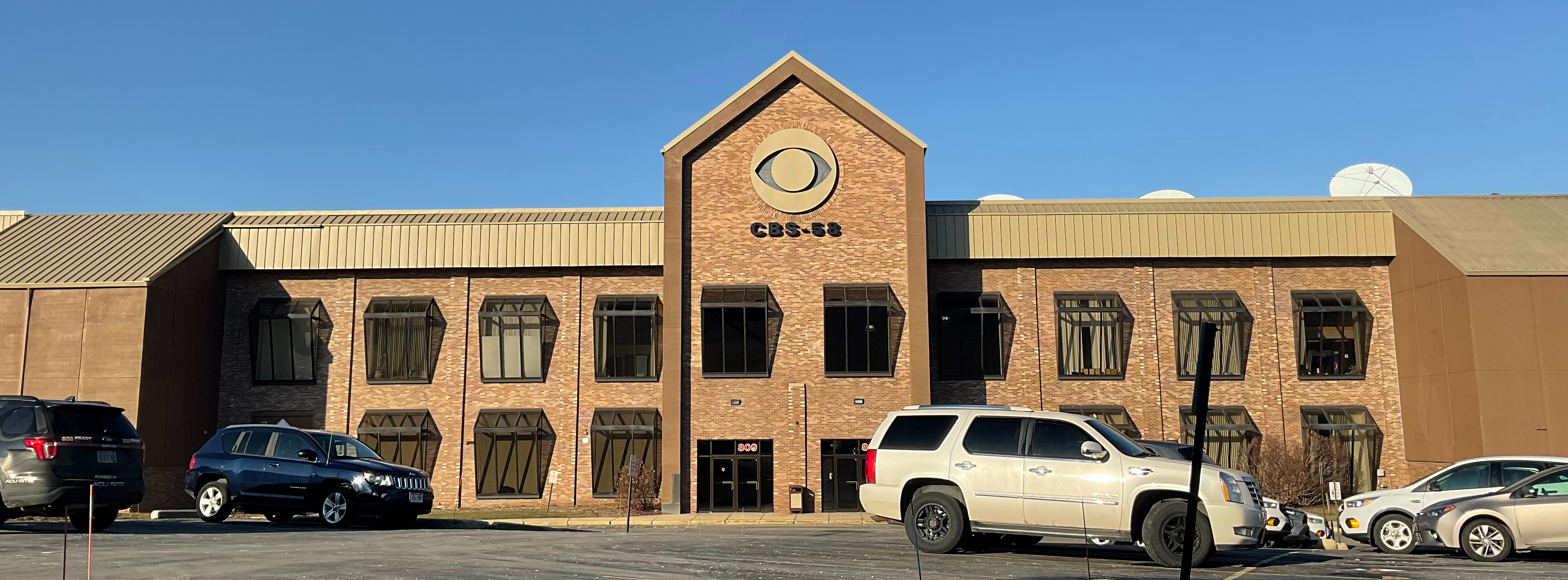
Weigel's Milwaukee studio center in West Allis

While the station had hoped to begin broadcasting full-length newscasts by the end of 1995, the station was behind on setting up the city's fourth news department because it wanted to confirm a tower site before it selected a location for new studios. While WDJT-TV initially maintained its downtown offices for sales and administrative personnel, local news debuted on March 18, 1996, from facilities in the former Allis-Chalmers complex in West Allis belonging to television production company The Enterprise, Ltd. The total investment in the news operation came to $10 million.

Additionally, the new transmitter facility was activated in November 1996, giving channel 58 a coverage area comparable to the other major Milwaukee stations. The dispute with WISN-TV continued, forcing the station to install a $500,000 steel bridge over nearby Lincoln Creek just to access the tower because WISN-TV would not permit WDJT-TV's engineers to cross its land. A further technical improvement making the station more accessible came in 1998, when most local cable systems moved WDJT from higher positions to the lower channel 5.

Despite improvements in the technical facility, news, syndicated programming, and positioning, WDJT-TV has continued to trail its competitors in local ratings since becoming an affiliate. In 2001, for instance, it struggled to retain viewers for its newscasts after CBS network programs, and its 6 p.m. local newscast finished seventh or even eighth in the market. The station did have success with some new syndicated programs, notably the 2005 acquisition of game shows Jeopardy! and Wheel of Fortune as a lead-in to prime time programming, which in turn boosted ratings for the CBS prime time lineup.

In July 2010, a flash flooding event caused damage to the Lincoln Park transmitter facility, leaving the station unable to normally broadcast for three days. While local cable systems received a direct feed from the studios and were unaffected, WTMJ-TV broadcast the station as a subchannel, reciprocating after a 2009 lightning strike disabled WTMJ-TV's transmitter and Weigel offered the station the use of a WBME subchannel temporarily.

=== Subchannels and multicast experiments ===
In the late 2000s, Weigel began adding digital subchannels to WDJT-TV, a preview of what would later become one of its most important businesses. Aside from a simulcast of WMLW-CA, then only broadcast in analog, the first unique subchannel offering on that station was MeTV, which debuted in March 2008. Soon after, Weigel purchased WJJA-TV, then a small station primarily airing home shopping programming, and relaunched it as WBME-TV, moving MeTV there. When that transition was completed, the subchannel was freed up, and WDJT-TV was then among the first carriers of This TV, a new diginet launched from the start as a national service by Weigel and MGM on November 1, 2008.

Two subchannel ventures involving WDJT-TV have been local, not national, services. In 2009, Weigel brokered subchannel 58.4 to Shorewest Realtors of Brookfield, Wisconsin, which since 2005 had been producing a local cable channel showing real estate listings. Shorewest TV ceased broadcasting over the air in 2013 as the real estate agency concentrated on its website, including a new streaming channel. The subchannel was then used to launch TouchVision, a loop of news and weather information produced under a separate company led by former radio and Tribune Company executive Lee Abrams. This continued until 2015, when Weigel instead opted to use the subchannel to launch its new national service Decades.

== Programming ==
=== Newscasts ===
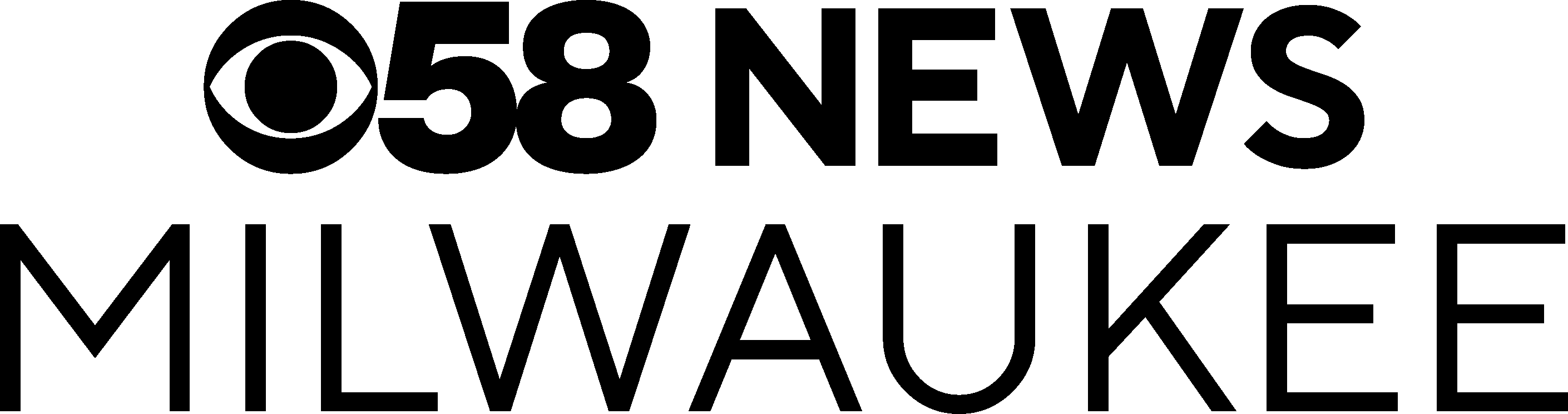
WDJT's current news logo

After offering a five-minute newsbreak at 10 p.m. as a stopgap, WDJT-TV debuted weeknight early and late evening newscasts from its new West Allis facilities on March 18, 1996. The original news team consisted largely of younger on-air personalities, including a reporter on the local entertainment beat, while the total news staff numbered 35. The intention was to match a shift in CBS's network programming at the time toward young audiences. However, when CBS shifted toward older viewers, WDJT-TV found itself needing to retool the news operation; as part of the changes, in 1997, the station also added weekend newscasts. A morning newscast was added in 2001, but the station was still not considered a contender in the Milwaukee market. More recent news expansions include a noon newscast in 2011, an expansion of the morning news to a 4:30 a.m. start in 2013, the introduction of 4 p.m. news in 2015, and additional newscasts on weekend mornings in 2021.

The WDJT newsroom provides news aired on three of Weigel's local stations. In 1997, when W46AR (now WYTU-LD) moved to the new Lincoln Park tower, WDJT began offering Spanish-language local news updates given by a bilingual reporter, Saúl Garza. A regular nightly newscast in Spanish debuted in 2007. Since 2008, the station has produced a 9 p.m. newscast for WMLW, which began as a trial during the 2007 World Series (when Fox affiliate WITI was committed to baseball coverage) and became an hour-long program in 2016. In 2020, a 7 a.m. morning news extension also debuted on WMLW. WDJT-TV also produced the newscast aired by WBND-LD, Weigel's ABC affiliate in South Bend, Indiana, until Weigel established its own newsroom there in April 2011.

In 2007, one of the station's newsgathering vehicles, parked on ice during a story on ice safety at Big Muskego Lake in Muskego, fell through the ice and sank, a loss worth as much as $250,000.

On January 21, 2025, WDJT-TV meteorologist Sam Kuffel, on her personal Instagram account, criticized Elon Musk for making a gesture that many equated with a Nazi salute during the second inauguration of Donald Trump. She was fired from the station the next day.

==== Notable current on-air staff ====
- Pavlina Osta – anchor/reporter

==== Notable former on-air staff ====
- Dawn Mitchell – sports anchor/reporter
- Tammie Souza – chief meteorologist

=== Sports programming ===
In 2024, WDJT parent company Weigel Broadcasting announced an agreement to broadcast ten Milwaukee Bucks games during the 2023–24 NBA season; the station already had an agreement to provide news and weather updates for fans in attendance at Fiserv Forum as the team's official weather forecaster. All 10 games aired on sister station WMLW-TV, though the February 23 game was simulcast on WDJT-TV and the March 4 game was aired in Spanish by WYTU-LD.

== Technical information and subchannels ==
WDJT-TV broadcasts from a transmitter facility in Lincoln Park in Milwaukee. The station's signal is multiplexed with standard-definition versions of the main feeds of WBME-CD, WMLW-TV, and WYTU-LD, as well as Weigel's Start TV diginet, which are only broadcast at low power on their originating stations.

Subchannels of WDJT-TV
| Subchannel | Res. | Short name | Programming |
|---|---|---|---|
| 58.1 | 1080i | WDJT-HD | CBS |
| 58.2 | 480i | MeTV-SD | MeTV (WBME-CD) |
| 58.3 | 480i | WMLW SD | WMLW-TV (Independent) |
| 58.4 | 480i | WYTU SD | Telemundo (WYTU-LD) |
| 58.5 | 480i | StartTV | Start TV (WYTU-LD 63.2) |

Simulcast of subchannels of another station

=== Analog-to-digital conversion ===
WDJT-TV shut down its analog signal on channel 58, at 11:59 p.m. on June 12, 2009, the official date on which full-power television stations in the United States transitioned from analog to digital broadcasts under federal mandate. The station's digital signal continued to broadcasts on its pre-transition channel 46, using virtual channel 58. For the rest of 2009, WYTU-LP served as an analog simulcast of WDJT-TV's main subchannel.

== Bibliography ==
- Golembiewski, Dick (2008). Milwaukee television history: the analog years (PDF). Milwaukee, Wisconsin: Marquette University Press. ISBN 978-1-4416-1215-1. OCLC 404166147. Archived (PDF) from the original on October 8, 2021.
