= WFBT =

WFBT may refer to:

- WFBT (FM), a radio station (106.7 FM) licensed to serve Carolina Beach, North Carolina, United States
- WMEU-CD, a low-power television station (channel 32) licensed to serve Chicago, Illinois, United States, which held the call sign WFBT-CD from 2008 to 2010
- WWME-CD, a low-power television station (channel 39) licensed to serve Chicago, Illinois, which held the call sign WFBT-CA from 2001 to 2004
- WFTC, a television station (channel 29) licensed to serve Minneapolis, Minnesota, United States, which held the call sign WFBT from 1982 to 1984
