= WCIU-TV =

Television station in Chicago

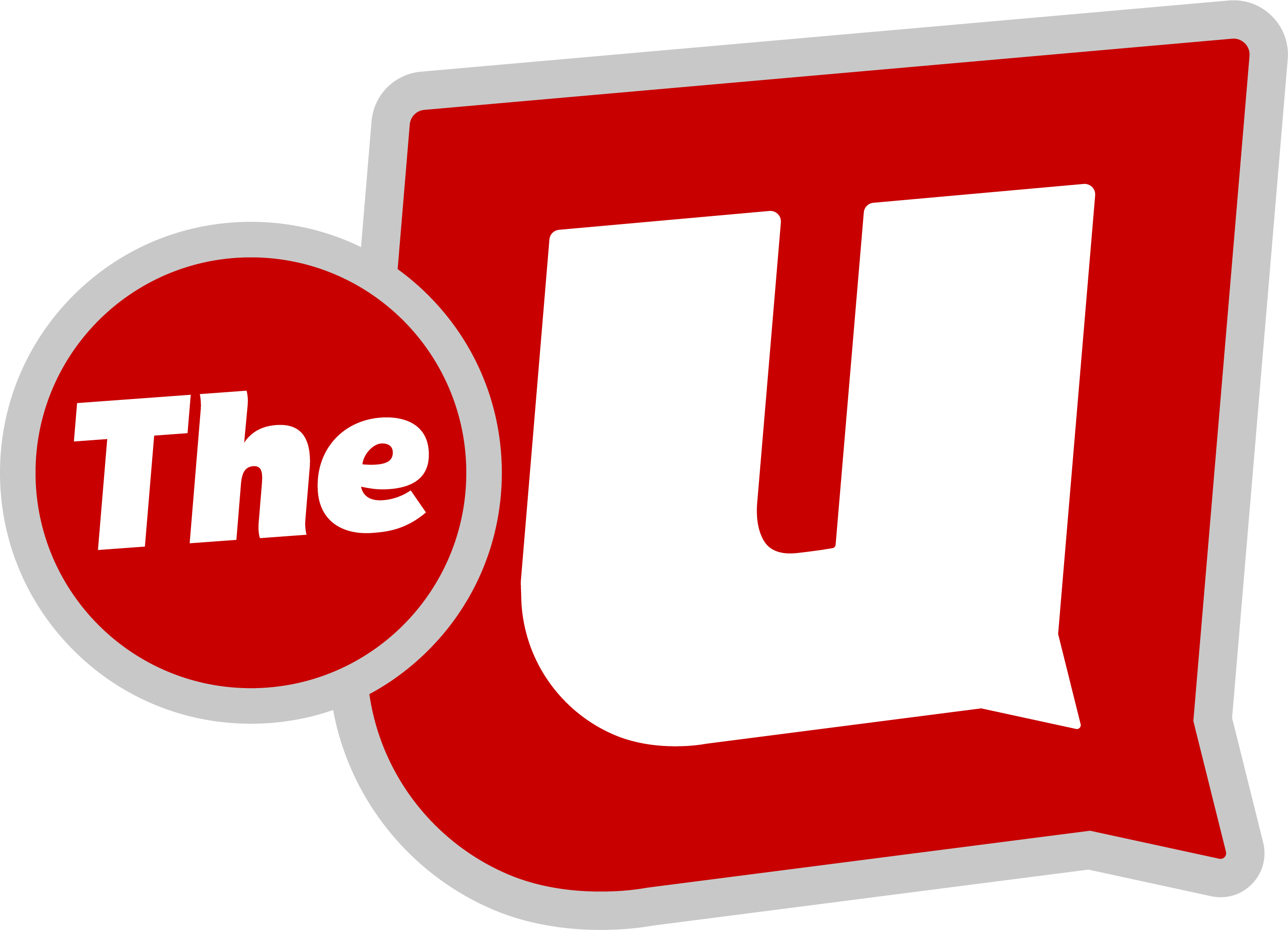
- Chicago, Illinois; United States
- Channels: Digital: 23 (UHF); Virtual: 26
- Branding: The U; The U Too (26.2); MeTV Chicago (26.3)

Programming
- Affiliations: 26.1: Independent; 26.2: The U Too (Independent); for others, see § Subchannels

Ownership
- Owner: Weigel Broadcasting; (WCIU-TV Limited Partnership)
- Sister stations: WWME-CD; WMEU-CD; WRME-LD

History
- First air date: February 6, 1964
- Former channel numbers: Analog: 26 (UHF, 1964–2009); Digital: 27 (UHF, 2002–2019)
- Former affiliations: Independent (1964–1968 and 1995–2019); SIN/Univision (1968–1985 and 1989–1994); NetSpan/Telemundo (1985–1989); Kids' WB (secondary, 1995–2004); The CW (2019–2024)
- Call sign meaning: Chicago Independent UHF

Technical information
- Licensing authority: FCC
- Facility ID: 71428
- ERP: 1,000 kW
- HAAT: 473 m (1,552 ft)
- Transmitter coordinates: 41°52′44.1″N 87°38′10.2″W

Links
- Public license information: Public file; LMS
- Website: www.wciu.com

WCIU-TV (channel 26) is an independent television station in Chicago, Illinois, United States. It is the flagship television property of locally based Weigel Broadcasting, which has owned the station since its inception, and is sister to two low-power stations: independent outlet WMEU-CD (channel 48) and MeTV/Heroes & Icons flagship WWME-CD (channel 23). The stations share studios on Halsted Street in the Greektown neighborhood; WCIU-TV's transmitter is located atop the Willis Tower in the Chicago Loop.

WCIU-TV was previously an affiliate of The CW; it was the largest CW affiliate by market size that was not owned or operated by Nexstar Media Group, which owns 81% of the network. This changed on September 1, 2024, when The CW returned to Nexstar-owned WGN-TV. Gray Media–owned WPCH-TV in Atlanta now holds the title.

== History ==
=== Early history ===
Founded by John J. Weigel (the father of Chicago sportscaster Tim Weigel), the station first signed on the air on February 6, 1964, as Chicago's first UHF station. It has been owned by Weigel Broadcasting since its inception. WCIU has spent much of its history carrying multi-ethnic entertainment programming. At its sign-on, channel 26 operated as an independent station; the call letters stand for "Chicago Independent UHF". A minority stake was held by businessman Howard Shapiro, who founded appliance store chain C.E.T. (Chicago Engineers for Television). Shapiro and his brother Gene took over Weigel Broadcasting and WCIU in 1966.

From the late 1960s until 1985, WCIU carried religious programs during the early morning. The station ran The Stock Market Observer—a business news block similar in format to the present-day cable channel CNBC—from about 8 a.m. to 3:30 p.m. each weekday; the service broadcast from the trading floor of the Chicago Board of Trade, with WCIU originally maintaining studio facilities at the top floor of the Chicago Board of Trade Building on West Jackson Boulevard. After 5 p.m. each weekday, the station ran Spanish language entertainment programming—including controversial bullfighting matches—from the Spanish International Network (the forerunner to Univision). During the weekend, WCIU ran a blend of religious programs, Spanish language programs, paid programming and various other ethnically oriented shows.

From 1966 to 1970, the station aired Kiddie A-Go-Go, a children's puppet and dance program which was hosted by Elaine Mulqueen. Several popular musical groups performed on the show, including The Four Seasons and New Colony Six. In 1970, channel 26 became the birthplace of the groundbreaking African American music program Soul Train, hosted by its creator (and then-WCIU station employee) Don Cornelius. The show later entered into national syndication and moved production to Los Angeles the following year, although WCIU continued to produce a local version of Soul Train exclusively for the Chicago market until 1976, initially and simultaneously with the Los Angeles-based version, with Cornelius himself as host, succeeded by Clinton Ghent, the main producer under Cornelius.

After WXXW (channel 20, allocation later occupied by PBS member station WYCC)—the second-to-last television station in the market that continued to broadcast in black-and-white—went dark in 1974, channel 26 remained the only television station in Chicago that still broadcast its programming in monochrome. Just prior to the Christmas season of 1974, the station installed and tested color transmission equipment, which broadcast on a low-power relay station located in Lincoln Park. In November 1974, the color and black-and-white signals traded transmitter facilities for the remainder of the holiday season; on December 31, 1974, the translator was taken offline as channel 26 started to broadcast in color full-time.

In the summer of 1985, the SIN affiliation moved to WSNS-TV (channel 44); WCIU, meanwhile, became affiliated part-time with NetSpan—which would eventually evolve into Telemundo—shortly thereafter. Later in the 1980s, Weigel Broadcasting expanded coverage of WCIU-TV to areas of western Illinois, northwest Indiana and southeastern Wisconsin through translator stations. In 1983, the station signed on W55AS (channel 55, now WBME-CD on channel 41) to relay WCIU's programming into the Milwaukee market. In 1987, WCIU launched two additional translators, W33AR (channel 33, now WFBN-LD) in Rockford, Illinois (which was converted into a simulcast of sister station WYTU-LD (channel 63) in Milwaukee in August 2012, to provide Telemundo programming into the Rockford market, as WSNS provides weak to rimshot signal coverage to that area; Telemundo eventually moved to the station's second subchannel to accommodate TouchVision, followed by H&I currently), and W12BK (channel 69, now MyNetworkTV affiliate WMYS-LD) in South Bend, Indiana.

On October 13, 1988, WSNS-TV announced that it would switch its affiliation to Telemundo after that station's affiliation agreement with Univision concluded on December 31; two months later on December 16, WCIU—whose contract with Telemundo was set to expire the following month—signed an affiliation agreement with Univision, returning the station to that network after two years. The two stations switched affiliations on January 10, 1989.

=== Return to full-time independence ===
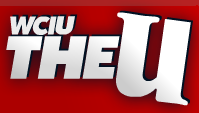
Former logo, from 2008 to 2017; The "U" in the logo was used since December 31, 1994

In 1993, Univision asked WCIU to drop all of its English-language programming, including Stock Market Observer, and carry the network's programming full-time. WCIU refused, which led Univision to purchase then-English language independent station WGBO-TV (channel 66) from Combined Broadcasting for $35 million on January 10, 1994, with the intent of moving its programming there the following January. That summer, Howard Shapiro hired Neal Sabin—former program director at WPWR-TV (channel 50)—as WCIU's vice president and general manager, who decided to remake WCIU into a conventional English-language general entertainment independent station. Univision assumed ownership of WGBO in August 1994, but was forced to run that station as an independent station for five months afterward as WCIU's affiliation contract with Univision did not expire until the end of the year. On December 31, 1994, WCIU switched to English-language general entertainment programming full-time and rebranded as "The U". In the spring of 1995, WCIU and low-powered sister station W23AT (channel 23, later WFBT-CA; now WWME-CD) moved their operations from the Chicago Board of Trade building into a 64,000-square-foot (5,946 m^{2}) studio facility at 30 North Halsted Street in Chicago's Near West Side community.

Upon the conversion, channel 26 picked up most of WGBO's syndicated programming inventory, along with newly purchased shows that were not carried by any of the other Chicago stations; it also moved its remaining ethnic programming to WFBT. Channel 26's programming began to feature mostly classic sitcoms and drama series (such as The Munsters, Gilligan's Island, Hogan's Heroes, The Rockford Files and Leave It to Beaver). The station also revived the horror/sci-fi movie showcase Svengoolie, which had previously run in the market on WFLD (channel 32) in two different incarnations between 1970 and that station's conversion into a Fox owned-and-operated station in 1986; Rich Koz—who reprised the role he previously played in WFLD's Son of Svengoolie for WCIU's revival of the showcase—also co-hosted the station's New Year's Eve relaunch celebration on December 31, 1994, alongside controversial talk show host Morton Downey Jr. (who himself hosted a short-lived talk show on the station, Downey, which briefly aired nationally on CNBC later in 1995) and served as one of the "U'z Guys," a group of hosts for various blocks of the station's programming. Initially, the station continued to run the Stock Market Observer from 8:30 a.m. to 3:30 p.m. and entertainment programming in all other weekday timeslots and throughout much of the broadcast day on weekends. WCIU then added a weekday block of children's programs from 7 to 9 a.m. in March 1995.

On February 19, 1995, WCIU signed a multi-year agreement with The WB to carry the network's children's program block, Kids' WB, upon its debut on September 9, 1995. The WB's primary affiliate in the market, WGN-TV (channel 9), opted not to carry the block and continued to run its morning newscast and an afternoon sitcom block in the time slots where Kids' WB would normally air on other WB affiliates (however, WGN's superstation feed for cable providers outside of the Chicago area and satellite providers nationwide carried Kids' WB programming, in addition to The WB's prime time schedule). The agreement also allowed WCIU to carry WB prime time programming in the event that WGN-TV chose to preempt it in order to air Cubs, White Sox and Bulls evening games.

In order to make room for the Kids' WB block, the full Stock Market Observer broadcast moved to WFBT-CA, on September 9. The weekday business news programming was then reduced to a 3 1/2-hour block from 8:30 a.m. to noon, a move which was criticized by some viewers; although it cited that Weigel had "no intention of killing" the program, Sabin cited the program's niche format and limited ratings and revenue for the block's shift to WFBT, in order for channel 26 to carry more profitable entertainment programming. In 2000, the program was rebranded as "WebFN", a joint venture between Weigel and Bridge Information Systems (which also aired on Milwaukee sister station WMLW-CA)."WebFN" would eventually feature several anchors formerly employed with WMAQ radio (670 AM) after that station was replaced by sports talk outlet WSCR in 2000.

Former logo, 2017–2019; the logo would then be used on WMEU from 2019 to 2024

By the late 1990s, WCIU began adding more recent sitcoms; the station began to add more syndicated first-run talk and reality shows onto its daytime lineup in 2000. In September 2001, WCIU dropped the morning children's block, reducing children's programming to the afternoon. In September 2004, the station dropped the Kids' WB weekday and Saturday blocks, which moved to WGN-TV, resulting in that station clearing the entire WB network schedule for the first time. Classic sitcoms gradually disappeared from WCIU's schedule between 2001 and 2004 (some of these programs would find their way onto WFBT when it began running a classic television programming block called "MeTV", which would become that station's full-time format under the callsign WWME-CA on January 1, 2005). Early in 2005, the business news format was scaled back to include only the existing syndicated program First Business, which Weigel had assumed production responsibilities for in 2003 after WebFN went bankrupt. That program continued until the end of 2014 under Weigel ownership, and the Chicago Board Options Exchange took over responsibilities for the program as Business First AM; it continues to air in Chicago on CN100 and the Total Living Network.

=== Switch to The CW (2019–2024) ===
Logo as "CW26", used from 2019 to 2024

On April 18, 2019, Weigel Broadcasting signed an agreement with CBS Corporation through which WCIU-TV would take over as The CW's Chicago-area affiliate on September 1, replacing WPWR-TV, which had been carrying the network's programming since September 1, 2016. To accommodate the CW prime time lineup, WCIU moved its evening lineup of syndicated programs to WMEU-CD/WCIU-DT2. WMEU-CD/WCIU-DT2, which has been known as "The U Too", took the branding of "The U" on September 1. The new "The U" would also become the new home of the major high school sports championships of the Illinois High School Association. Channel 26 was the third station in Chicago to affiliate with The CW, after WGN-TV (2006–2016) and WPWR-TV (2016–2019). Weigel already had experience running a CW affiliate, as it owns WCWW-LD in the adjacent South Bend market.

Like WPWR (which is under a channel sharing agreement with sister station WFLD), WCIU carries its main channel at 720p, below The CW's default 1080i resolution, due to running several standard definition subchannels, along with The U in 720p.

=== Second return to independence (2024–present) ===
On May 1, 2024, it was announced that The CW would return to WGN-TV in September and WCIU-TV would revert to independent status. By that July, in conjunction with the announcement of WCIU acquiring syndicated reruns of Bob Hearts Abishola, the station announced it would revive "The U" as its branding, with the brand moving from its previous home at WMEU, with the move; the rebrand would take effect on August 1, during the final month of the CW affiliation, with the station promoting the relaunch with a slightly modified version of their original slogan, "The U'z STILL Got It!".

== Programming ==
=== Local programming ===
WCIU-TV has broadcast many locally produced programs over the years; among them are Ultrascope (a program sponsored by Sears that was used to sell UHF-capable televisions and boxes within their Chicago area stores, and featured a format similar to Music Choice featuring a clock/album cover display and album audio which aired daily from 9 a.m. to 5 p.m.), Ted and the Angel (a talk show hosted by Ted Weber and Angel Tompkins from 1967 to 1968, which was nominated for a Regional Emmy Award in its first year; Weber later hosted two other WCIU programs, Ted Weber In Old Town and The C.E.T. Amateur Hour). The Homework Show (1995–2006), U Dance with B96 (an American Bandstand-style music/dance show hosted by DJs from WBBM-FM, 1995–1997), Stooge-A-Palooza (a showcase of Three Stooges shorts with Rich Koz, 2003–2010), Soul Train (1970–1976, local version only; nationally syndicated version from Los Angeles was seen from 1971 to 2006, locally on WBBM-TV and later, WGN-TV), The Bob Lewandowski Show, (1964–1995), Outdoor Sportsman (1978–1985; originally aired on WSNS-TV, it was produced and hosted by local outdoorsman Joe Wyer), Stock Market Observer (1968–2000), WebFN (2000–2003, replaced the Stock Market Observer), Kiddie-A-Go-Go (1964–1967), Western Theatre with Two Ton Baker (1964–1965), Marty Faye Show, The Chicago Party (c. 1982), Eddie Korosa's Polka Party (c. 1978) and First Business (a business news program which Weigel took over production in 2003, replacing WebFN, and syndicated nationally through MGM Television until 2014).

Current local programs seen on WCIU include the horror/sci-fi film showcase Svengoolie (which is syndicated to MeTV and other Weigel stations), religious program Rock of Ages and the children's program Green Screen Adventures (which also syndicated to MeTV, This TV and other Weigel stations).

In 2022, WCIU became the home of the Chicago Thanksgiving Parade, after the parade had been relegated to low-power television in 2021.

=== Sports programming ===
On July 8, 1999, WGN-TV and WCIU-TV entered into a programming arrangement involving sports coverage, which allowed channel 26 to carry select Chicago Bulls basketball and White Sox baseball games, and a handful of Cubs baseball games that are produced by and contracted to air on WGN-TV, due to that station's network affiliation contracts (with The CW and previously The WB) that limit the number of programming preemptions that WGN-TV is allowed on an annual basis, and rights restrictions enforced by the NBA which limited the number of Bulls telecasts aired on WGN's national superstation feed WGN America—prior to that channel's removal of WGN-produced programs upon its conversion into a basic cable channel in December 2014—to fifteen games per season.

Sports broadcasts on WCIU were previously branded under the "BullsNet", "HawksNet", "CubsNet" and "SoxNet" banners until 2010, when they were rebranded under the umbrella title WGN Sports on The U. In 2011, all White Sox, Blackhawks, Bulls and Cubs games televised on WCIU began to be syndicated to local stations in central Illinois and Iowa through the "WGN Sports Network" service. Prior to this, select Bulls games aired by WCIU and WGN had been simulcast to many of these same stations. In April 2006, WCIU began broadcasting White Sox, Cubs and Bulls home games in high definition, with away games following suit in April 2008. In February 2015, Weigel Broadcasting discontinued its agreement with Tribune Broadcasting to carry Cubs and White Sox telecasts produced by WGN, so as to not have the game broadcasts conflict with the WLS-TV-produced prime time newscast on WCIU (with WPWR-TV taking over as an overflow feed for WGN). The Blackhawks returned in 2025; with one game airing due to a Bulls and White Sox conflict on Chicago Sports Network. The White Sox also returned in 2025. Chicago Sports Network and WCIU reached an agreement to simulcast seven games beginning in July. The simulcast will include a three-game series against the Cubs in late July.

In 2021, WCIU began airing a limited amount of Chicago Sky games. From 2022 to 2024, the limited games on WCIU were aired in partnership with Marquee Sports Network, which also streamed these games on Marquee Plus. In 2025, WCIU acquired the exclusive local rights to the Sky.

From 2010 until 2016, WCIU has served as a local over-the-air broadcaster of NFL games involving the Chicago Bears that are televised by ESPN's Monday Night Football. WLS-TV (channel 7), WCIU's news partner, is an owned-and-operated station of ABC (itself a sister network to ESPN through ABC parent The Walt Disney Company's majority ownership of the cable network), but has chosen to exercise its right of first refusal to carry MNF games, deferring most games aired since 2010 in order to air Dancing with the Stars (due to the program's popularity and the structure of its live voting requirements) during that program's fall season. It also carried a Cubs game in lieu of WLS-TV in mid-September 2019 (when The CW was still in its summer season), as ABC unexpectedly scheduled the sixth-season finale of Bachelor in Paradise for the same evening. This was no longer an issue to any Chicago broadcast station beginning in 2020 with the move of all Chicago professional sports locally to NBC Sports Chicago and Marquee Sports Network (outside network telecasts and the Bears).

The station refused carriage of the 2023 LIV Golf season after the controversial golf league contracted with The CW (now majority-owned by Nexstar Media Group) to carry their tournaments; in Chicago, it airs on Nexstar's WGN-TV instead, though Weigel does carry it on WCWW-LD in South Bend, making it likely that existing programming commitments (including to the Illinois High School Association) and a strong weekend syndication schedule led Weigel to decline the coverage. WCIU has also declined to air The CW's coverage of Atlantic Coast Conference football and men's basketball games.

== Newscasts ==
Alongside the Stock Market Observer, WCIU's first standalone local news programming effort debuted in 1968, when it launched a half-hour weeknight 10 p.m. newscast titled A Black's View of the News, a program focusing on news and commentary relevant to Chicago's African American community. The program—which served as a launching pad for eventual Soul Train host Don Cornelius—was canceled in 1982.

In September 2009, WCIU debuted You and Me This Morning, a weekday morning program featuring a broad mix of entertainment news, lifestyle features and weather forecasts. The program—which effectively maintains a lighter format, which does not incorporate conventional general news segments—originally aired in the form of locally produced inserts of varying length interspersed within what otherwise was a three-hour block of syndicated programming on WCIU and classic television series on WWME-CA from 6 to 8 a.m. Although it trails behind the WGN Morning News on WGN-TV and Good Day Chicago on WFLD (as well as the national morning programs on WMAQ-TV, WLS-TV and WBBM-TV that the second hour of the program also competes against) in the ratings, viewership for the program has increased since its debut; in particular, its ratings doubled from an average of 40,000 viewers in May 2012 to 73,000 in May 2014. You & Me This Morning expanded into a full three-hour program (running from 6 to 9 a.m.) on September 8, 2014.

On December 14, 2014, WCIU entered into a news share agreement with ABC owned-and-operated station WLS-TV to produce a weeknight-only 7 p.m. newscast for channel 26. Titled ABC 7 Eyewitness News at 7:00 on The U, the program debuted on January 12, 2015, as the third prime time newscast among the Chicago market's commercial television stations, behind the longer established in-house 9 p.m. newscasts on WGN-TV and Fox owned-and-operated station WFLD (channel 32). With the news share agreement, WLS-TV became the fifth ABC-owned station to produce a newscast for a separately owned station in its home market (along with existing programs produced by ABC O&Os in Raleigh, Philadelphia, San Francisco and Los Angeles for WLFL, WPHL-TV, KOFY-TV and KDOC-TV in the respective markets, and a since-cancelled newscast produced by KFSN-TV for KAIL in Fresno). WLS-TV newscasts on WCIU featured news anchors Cheryl Burton and Linda Yu, along with chief meteorologist Jerry Taft and Jim Rose on sports. On July 29, 2019, WCIU-TV and WLS-TV jointly announced that the newscast would end on August 30, a move related to WCIU's affiliation with The CW.

On June 14, 2017, WCIU announced that it would launch The Jam, a new morning show that would replace You and Me This Morning in the 6 to 8 a.m. timeslot that summer at a date to be determined. The program—which the station's head of programming and creative, Steve Bailey, described would "promise[...] to be bold and unfiltered"—will feature a mix of local and national news headlines (as well as opinions on the featured stories by its hosts), entertainment and pop culture news, and weather forecasts. The program's concept is based in part on The Daily Buzz, a syndicated morning news program that ran from 2002 to 2015, which Bailey (who joined Weigel Broadcasting in October 2016, after serving as director of programming and affiliate marketing at Media General) had previously worked as the program's vice president of marketing and promotions.

== Technical information ==
=== Subchannels ===
The station's signal is multiplexed:

Subchannels of WCIU-TV
Subchannel	Res.	Short name	Programming
26.1	720p	The U	Main WCIU-TV programming
26.2	720p	U Too	WMEU-CD (Independent)
26.3	480i	MeTV	MeTV (WWME-CD)
26.4	480i	HEROES	Heroes & Icons
26.5	480i	STORY	Story Television
26.6	480i	CATCHY	Catchy Comedy
26.7	480i	TOONS	MeTV Toons
26.8	480i	WEST	WEST

Simulcast of subchannels of another station

=== Subchannel history ===
In July 2008, Weigel Broadcasting announced the launch of This TV, a national subchannel network operated as a joint venture between Metro-Goldwyn-Mayer and Weigel. This TV officially launched with WCIU as its flagship station (airing on digital subchannel 26.5) on November 1, 2008. This TV moved to the third digital subchannel of WGN-TV on November 1, 2013, as a result of the May 13, 2013, announcement that WGN owner Tribune Broadcasting would acquire Weigel's 50% ownership interest in This TV. Bounce TV (which was already carried on WWME-CD 23.2) began to occupy This TV's former subchannel, moving from WWME 23.2 to WCIU 26.5.

On December 1, 2010, WCIU dropped its ethnic programming service FBT on digital subchannel 26.6 and replaced it a simulcast of the station's main channel. Two weeks later on December 15, the 26.6 subchannel was dropped and its programming was shifted to digital channel 26.2 (replacing a simulcast of sister station WWME-CA, which moved to WCIU digital subchannel 26.3) where it continued to simulcast most of WCIU's main programming. In addition, virtual channel 48.1 was discontinued (to be later used by the digital signal of WMEU-CA) while 23.1 reverted to being the virtual channel number for WWME-CA (23.2 was also discontinued at that time; it has since been restored, and now serves as an affiliate of Heroes & Icons).

On January 4, 2011, MGM and Weigel Broadcasting announced plans to turn the MeTV format that originated on sister station WWME-CA into a national network. The national MeTV service launched on WWME and WCIU digital subchannel 26.3 on December 15, 2010.

The following day on January 5, digital subchannel 26.2 was relaunched with its own general entertainment format, branded as "The U Too"—a nod to the main channel's longtime branding, "The U". The service features some time-shifted programming from WCIU's main channel, including some syndicated programs not seen in the Chicago market prior to the format conversion. It also broadcast a handful of DePaul Blue Demons and other basketball games from the "old" Big East Conference; "The U Too" currently serves as the over-the-air broadcaster of WNBA games from the Chicago Sky and AHL hockey games from the Chicago Wolves. From January 10, 2011, to September 2013, The U Too subchannel was also simulcast on the analog signal of WWME-CA until The U Too began broadcasting in high definition on WMEU-CD channel 48.1 (the 26.2 version of the U Too signal remains in 16:9 standard definition widescreen). Currently, WWME-CA's analog signal simulcasts Heroes & Icons as aired on digital subchannel 26.4.

On May 4, 2021, Weigel announced that WCIU-DT5 would become the inaugural affiliate of MeTV spinoff MeTV Plus upon its May 15 launch; Bounce TV was reported to move its Chicago affiliate to a subchannel of WCPX at that time. The channel would air a variety of sitcoms and drama series, similar to the format of original spinoff MeToo, and is believed to be Weigel's answer to Rewind TV, a spinoff of Antenna TV launched by Nexstar Media Group that September.

On June 26, 2025, Fubo announced a multi-year agreement with Weigel Broadcasting for distribution of its diginets nationwide and WCIU to viewers in the Chicago market.

=== Analog-to-digital conversion ===
On June 12, 2009, the date of the federally mandated switch from analog to digital television for full-power stations, WCIU-TV shut down its analog signal. The station's digital signal remained on its pre-transition UHF channel 27, using virtual channel 26.

From June 13, 2009, to January 9, 2011, WCIU-TV's main programming was simulcast on sister station WWME-CA (channel 23) to provide a nightlight service as the low-power station continued to operate an analog signal. From June 13 to July 12, 2009, the station ran newscasts from WMAQ-TV (channel 5) and WGN-TV for viewers that either were not ready for the digital transition or had problems receiving WGN and WMAQ's signals after the June 12 digital transition. WWME-CA continued to operate an analog signal on UHF channel 23.
