= National Hellenic Museum =

Museum about Greek-American heritage in Chicago, Illinois

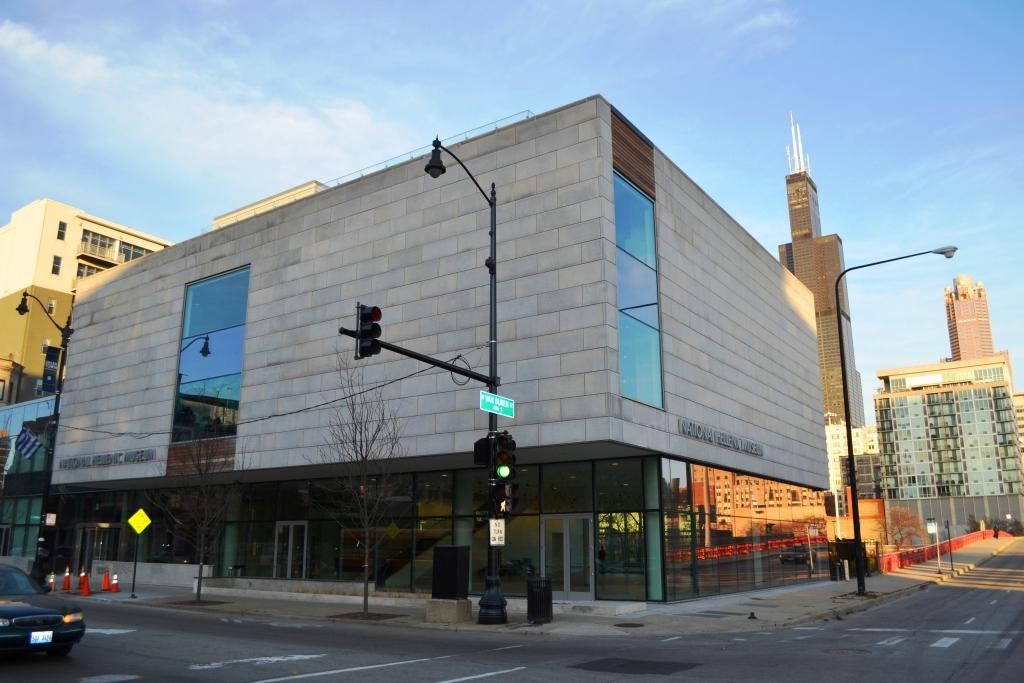
- Established: 1983
- Location: 333 South Halsted Street; Chicago, Illinois 60661; United States
- Coordinates: 41.87687°N 87.64692°W
- Collection size: ~18,000 Artifacts; ~10,000 Archival Items; 200 Oral Histories
- Visitors: 7,000 - 11,000 (Yearly Average)
- Public transit access: Chicago Blue Line; Halsted Street Station
- Website: nationalhellenicmuseum.org
- Area: 40,000 square feet (3,700 m^{2})

The National Hellenic Museum is the second oldest American institution dedicated to displaying and celebrating the cultural contributions of Greeks and Greek-Americans. Formerly known as the Hellenic Museum and Cultural Center, the National Hellenic Museum is located in Chicago’s Greektown, at the corner of Halsted and Van Buren Streets. The National Hellenic Museum has recently undergone a modernization program that cumulated in the museum moving to its current building in December 2011. The official opening of the NHM took place on December 10, 2011 and proved to be a marked event within the Greek community of Chicago.

Created to promote understanding of the rich cultural traditions of ancient and contemporary Greece, as well as a focus on the Greek-American immigrant experience, the National Hellenic Museum has become a fixture in the Greek Community in Chicago.

== History ==
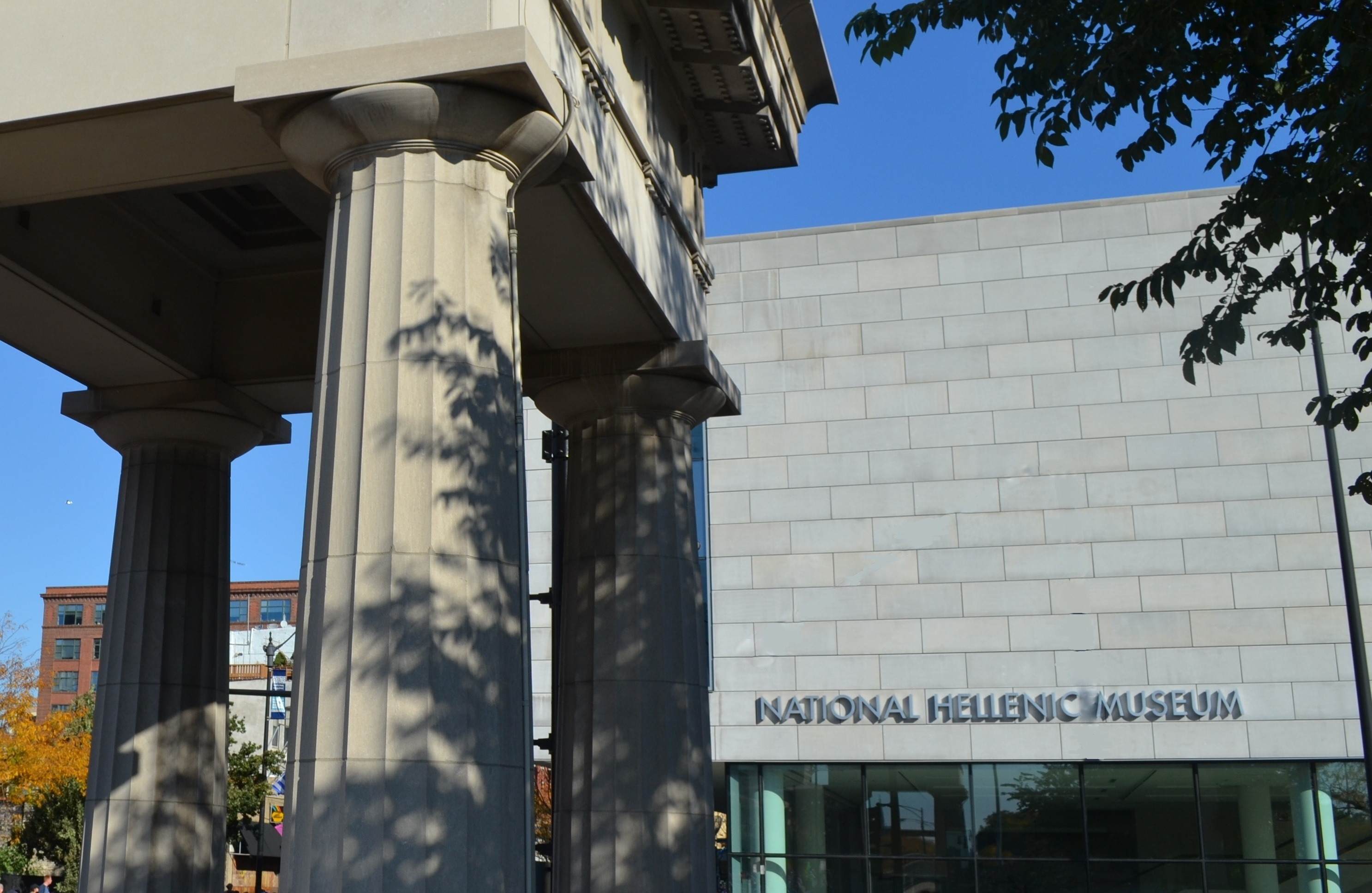
The literal and ideological corner of Greektown

Founded as the Hellenic Museum and Cultural Center, in 1983, the National Hellenic has a rich history in Chicago.

In 1992, the HMCC opened the doors of its first museum facility, located on Michigan Avenue in downtown Chicago. This was two weeks after the Hellenic Cultural Museum in Salt Lake City opened as the first museum dedicated to preserving Hellenic customs, heritage, history and way of life.

In July 2004, the Chicago Museum moved to a new location at 801 S. Adams Street in Chicago’s Greektown

In 2009, the museum re-branded itself the National Hellenic Museum, with a new logo incorporating the Greek key design, and created a new mission statement: "Connecting generations through Greek history, culture, and art."

In 2011, the museum moved to its current, purpose built facility at 333 South Halsted Street, in the heart of Chicago's Greektown.

== Building change ==
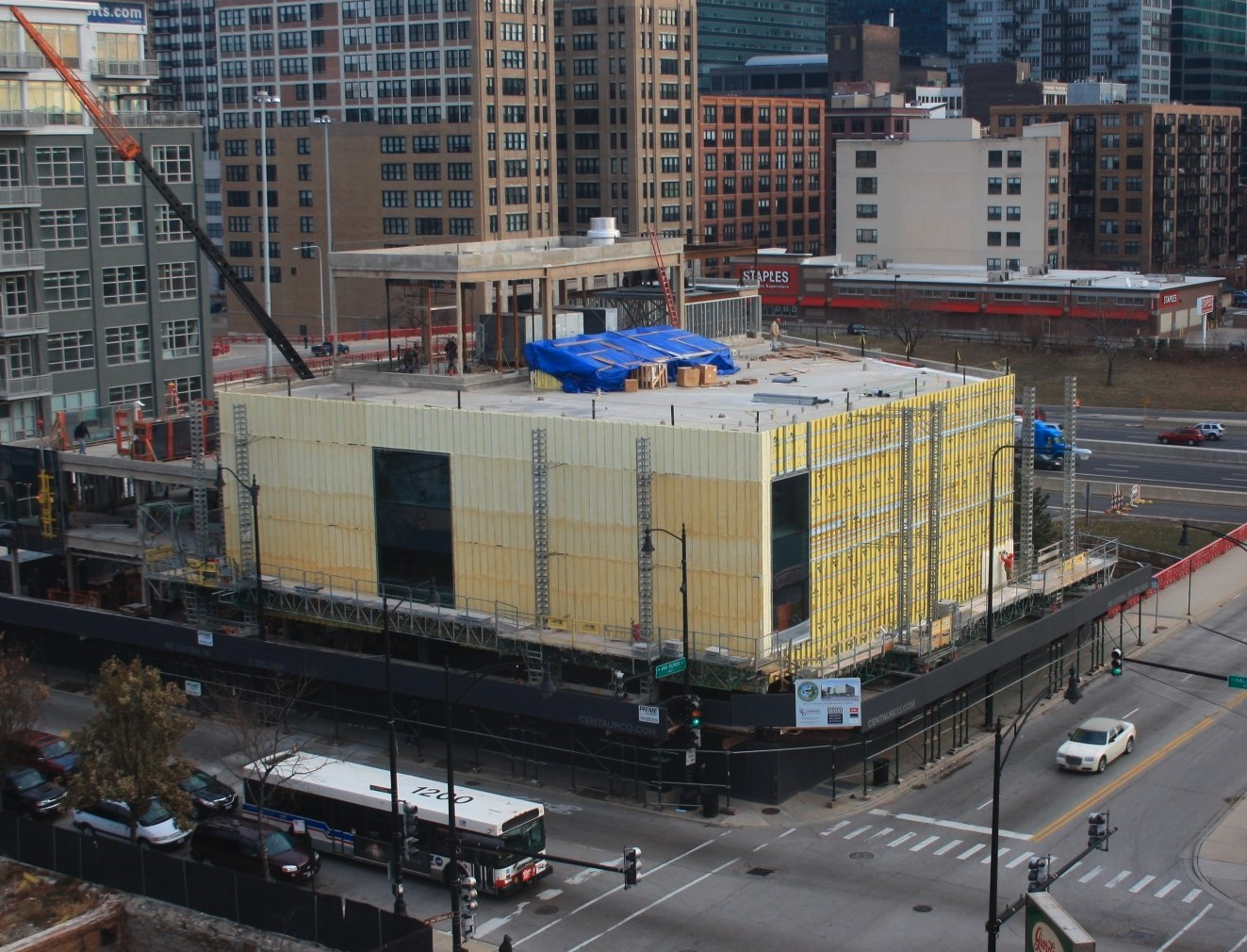
Construction of the new museum facility in January, 2011

In fall 2005, the Museum broke ground at the site of the new facility, billed as the cornerstone to Chicago Mayor Richard M. Daley’s Greektown Redevelopment Plan. The new building is 40,000-square-foot (3,700 m^{2}) contemporary facility, featuring permanent and rotating exhibition halls, a library and archival research center, classroom for children of all ages, and an oral history center featuring the National Hellenic Museum’s Oral History project. A rooftop terrace will feature three gardens and provide dramatic views of the Chicago skyline during the summer months.

The new National Hellenic Museum was designed by architect Demetrios Stavrianos, an Executive Director with KTGY Architecture + Planning, in Chicago, IL.

The new facility was completed in 2011 with the grand opening taking place on December 10, 2011.

== The Oral History Project ==
The National Hellenic Museum’s Oral History Project is an effort to document the Greek immigrant experience in America through the process of interviewing and recording the life stories of individuals of Greek descent. Approximately 450,000 Greeks came to America between 1890 and 1920 as part of the flood of Eastern Europe immigrants. The Oral History Project has more than 300 individual histories as of 2015, spanning hundreds of hours of film and audio tape, from Greeks and Greek Americans from all over the United States.

== Collections ==
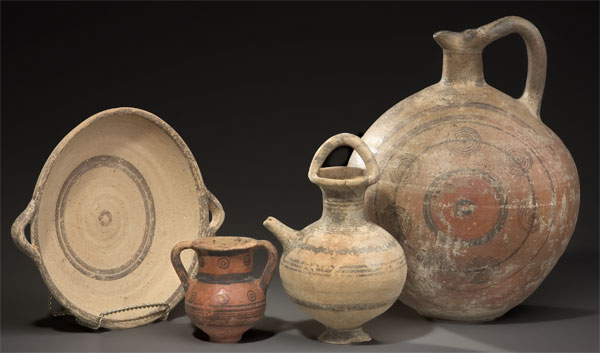
Items from the NHM Collection

The National Hellenic Museum’s extensive collection spans the thousands of years of Greek history, with pieces from every period of history from 1200 BCE through today. The collection prominently features artifacts of the Greek-American immigrant experience including, handmade textiles, traditional costumes, and musical instruments, as well as original photographs.

== Library and Archives ==
The National Hellenic Museum’s Library and Archives includes well over 10,000 books, serial publications, and other documents. The library’s collection is composed of books on Greek history, culture, language, and religion, and includes such rare volumes as 17th and 18th century manuscripts. The archival collection includes years of Greek-American newspapers, magazines, and archival records, among other printed materials.

The National Hellenic Museum's archival collections include hand-written letter collections, early-modern manuscripts, and one of the largest archives of Greek-language newspapers in the United States.

== Exhibitions ==
The National Hellenic Museum hosts a variety of exhibitions each year, spanning the breadth of Greek history, culture, and art.

Current Exhibitions

- Legacy, Renewal & Unity and Archons of the Ecumenical Patriarchate
- Gather Together: Chicago Street Photography by Diane Alexander White
- Change: The Story of Coins
- Reaching for the American Dream: The Legacy of Greek Immigration
- The Story of Greek Independence

Past Exhibitions

- Lives Afloat: The Greek Refugee Crisis through the lens of Tasos Markou 2015-2017
- George Kokines: Layers Revealed
- Sweet Home Chicago: The Story of America's Candy Capital
- Aegean: Creation of an Archipelago
- Transcending Boundaries: The Art of Anthony Quinn
- The Street is My Gallery, a visual display of street art in Athens
- Monumental, a hands-on exhibit about Greek architecture
- The Periklean Akropolis: From Antiquity To Modernity
- The Greek Monsters
- From Memory: Giorgios Rigas
- Threads of Tradition
- The Holocaust In Greece
- Gods, Myths, And Mortals

== Events ==
Along with smaller events which take place on a weekly or monthly schedule, such as cocktail receptions, dinner receptions, brunches, meet-and-greet events, and holiday-themed events, the National Hellenic Museum has several marquee events which it hosts each year.

- Annual Gala – The Gala is the National Hellenic Museum's signature yearly fundraising event, and is held at various locations. The event includes dinner, music, dancing, live and silent auctions, ethnic performances and entertainment, in addition speeches by the museum director and honored guests, and cocktails.
- Kouzina – Chefs from the Chicago area gather at the National Hellenic Museum to put on a showcase of Mediterranean cuisine. Dishes include various appetizers, salads, entrées, desserts, and beverages. The event also includes music and cocktails at the museum.
