= Greek Islands (restaurant) =

Restaurant in Chicago, Illinois, U.S.

- Interactive map of Greek Islands

Restaurant information
- Established: 1971; 55 years ago
- Location: 200 S. Halsted Street, Greektown, Chicago, Illinois, United States
- Coordinates: 41°52′44″N 87°38′51″W
- Website: www.greekislands.net

Greek Islands is a restaurant in Chicago, Illinois founded in 1971 by Konstantinos Koutsogeorgas. It is located at 200 S. Halsted Street in the Greektown neighborhood to the immediate west of downtown Chicago.

== History ==
The restaurant was founded in 1971, and does a thriving business to good reviews. Similar to other Greek restaurants in Chicago, it serves saganaki, but has above-average seafood. In January 2008 it was featured on the Food Network's The Hungry Detective. Its second location in Lombard, Illinois.
