= Calvin Tran =

Calvin Tran is a Vietnamese-American fashion designer and creative director of his eponymous label.

== Early life ==
Born in Vietnam, he moved to the U.S. and studied design, later apprenticing under fashion designer Carolina Herrera. He worked as Creative Director at Zabari in New York. Tran launched his own independent line in SoHo, Manhattan in 2001, later operating a boutique on Halsted Street, Chicago. His work has been featured in Bravo's The Ultimate Collection, The New York Times, Women's Wear Daily, and Cosmopolitan. Tran appeared on Superman/Batman: Public Enemies (2009), It's Always Sunny in Philadelphia (2005) and We the Internet TV (2015).
