= WWME-CD =

Television station in Chicago

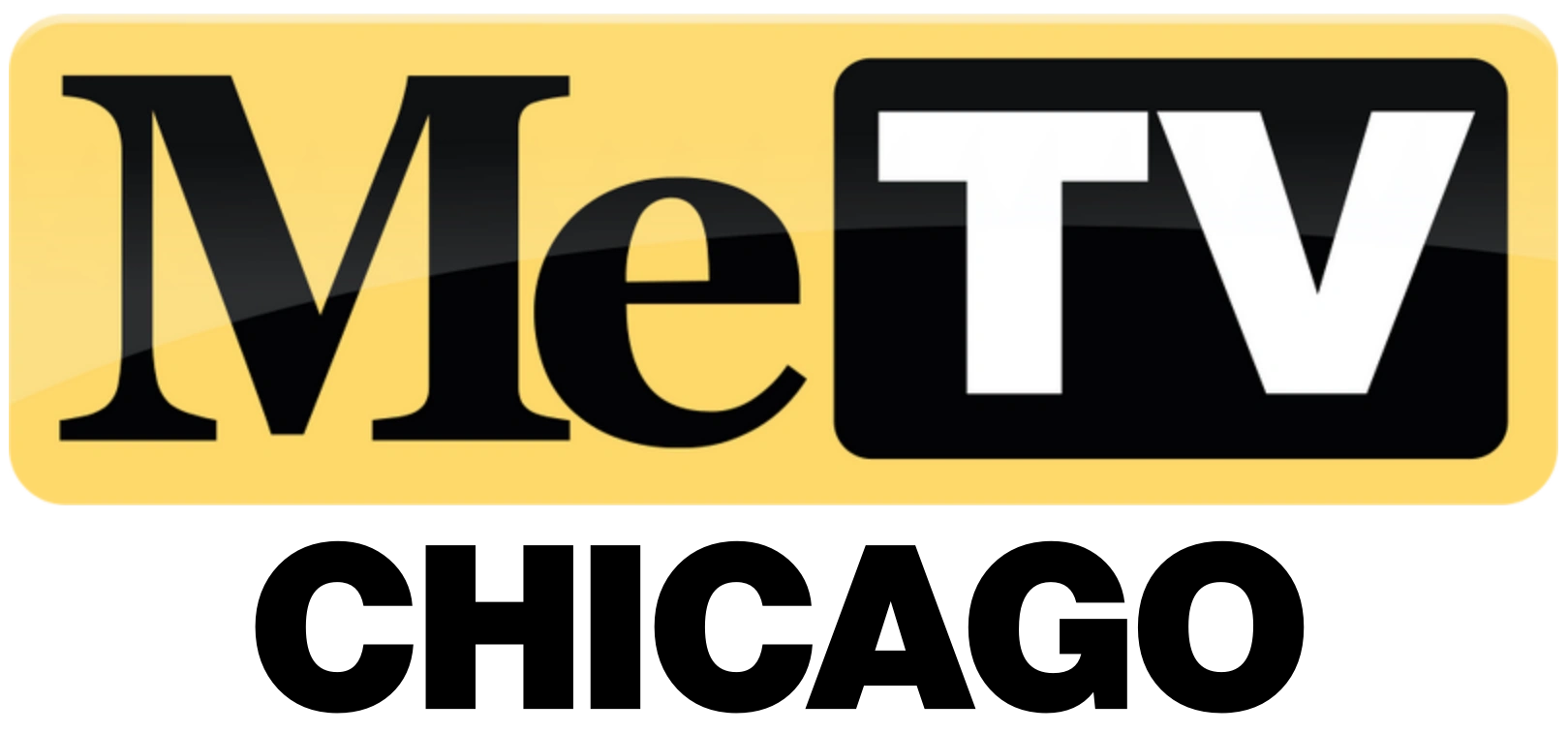
- Chicago, Illinois; United States
- Channels: Digital: 20 (UHF); Virtual: 23
- Branding: MeTV Chicago

Programming
- Affiliations: 23.1: MeTV; 23.2: Heroes & Icons; 23.12: OnTV4U

Ownership
- Owner: Weigel Broadcasting; (Channel 23 Limited Partnership)
- Sister stations: WCIU-TV; WMEU-CD; WRME-LD

History
- Founded: October 28, 1987
- First air date: January 14, 1989
- Former call signs: W23AT (1989–2001); WFBT-CA (2001–2004); WWME-CA (2004–2015)
- Former channel numbers: Analog: 23 (UHF, 1989–2015); Digital: 39 (UHF, 2008–2019)
- Former affiliations: Unknown/Independent (1989–2003); Bounce TV (LD2, 2011–2014)
- Call sign meaning: Memorable Entertainment Television (reference to MeTV slogan, from which the backronym of the network's name is derived)

Technical information
- Licensing authority: FCC
- Facility ID: 71425
- Class: CD
- ERP: 15 kW
- HAAT: 443.5 m (1,455 ft)
- Transmitter coordinates: 41°52′44.1″N 87°38′10.2″W
- Translator(s): WCIU-TV 26.3 Chicago

Links
- Public license information: Public file; LMS
- Website: www.metvnetwork.com

WWME-CD (channel 23) is a low-power, Class A television station in Chicago, Illinois, United States, which serves as the flagship station of multicast networks MeTV and Heroes & Icons. It is owned by locally based Weigel Broadcasting alongside fellow Weigel flagship properties and independent stations WCIU-TV (channel 26) and WMEU-CD (channel 48). The stations share studios on Halsted Street (between Washington Boulevard and Madison Street) in the Greektown neighborhood, while WWME-CD's transmitter is located atop the Willis Tower on South Wacker Drive in the Chicago Loop.

Even though WWME-CD has a digital signal of its own, the low-power broadcasting radius does not reach the outer ring of Chicago proper or surrounding suburbs. Therefore, the station can also be seen through a 16:9 widescreen standard definition simulcast on WCIU's third digital subchannel, with Heroes & Icons being carried on WCIU-DT4 in order to reach the entire market. This signal is broadcast on channel 26.3 from the same Willis Tower transmitter site.

== History ==
=== Early history ===
The station first signed on the air on October 28, 1987, as W23AT, originally operating as a translator of WFBT. In 2001, the station changed its callsign to WFBT-CA and shifted to a brokered-time ethnic programming format (coincidentally, this was the original programming format of sister station WCIU-TV from 1964 until it converted into an English-language, entertainment-based independent station on December 31, 1994).

=== Launch of MeTV as a programming format ===
On January 6, 2003, WFBT debuted a programming block called "MeTV", which featured classic television series from the 1950s to the 1980s (such as The Jack Benny Program, Sergeant Bilko, The Carol Burnett Show, Maude and One Day at a Time) daily from 12:00 to 3:00 p.m. "MeTV" underwent several lineup changes throughout its existence as a block, adding and removing shows and expanding the time periods during which it broadcast (eventually running from 8:30 a.m. to 3:30 p.m. by 2004).

On December 31, 2005, Weigel rechristened channel 23 as WWME-CA, with MeTV becoming the station's full-time programming format and on-air branding. The station's former ethnic programming and WFBT call letters moved to W48DD (channel 48). On August 4, 2007, WWME introduced "Sí! MeTV" (the first two parts of the moniker were based on the phrase "see me", although "Sí" is the Spanish word for "yes"), a weekend morning block which featured Spanish-dubbed versions of classic shows from the Universal Television library (such as Hercules, Xena, Miami Vice, Quantum Leap and The Incredible Hulk). Some programs that aired during the block were available to the station only in Spanish, due to syndicated restrictions imposed on the original English-language versions; "Sí! MeTV" also offered a public affairs program targeted at Chicago's Latino population, which began at a later date. The block was discontinued on January 25, 2009.

WWME-CD logo used from 2008 until 2014.

On March 1, 2008, channel 48 – which adopted the WMEU-CA call letters at that time – was converted into an extension of WWME's MeTV format as MeToo. Initially, the two stations maintained similar programming schedules; however by that fall, one station focused mainly on sitcoms while the other largely focused on dramas, and vice versa. In addition to classic television series, WWME also broadcast sporting events from the Chicago Public Schools Public League.

On September 14, 2009, WWME's MeTV schedule shifted its programming to a sitcom-intensive format (running such shows as The Bernie Mac Show, All in the Family, The Three Stooges and Frasier), while the MeToo schedule on WMEU-CA was restructured to feature only off-network dramatic programs (such as Perry Mason, Star Trek, Star Trek: The Next Generation and The Twilight Zone) and films to streamline the schedules of both MeTV outlets.

=== Conversion into the flagship station of the MeTV network ===
On November 22, 2010, Weigel Broadcasting announced that it would turn the MeTV concept into a national network that would compete along with similar classic television multicast networks such as the Retro Television Network and (the then yet-launched) Antenna TV, while complementing its successful sister network This TV. The MeTV network launched on December 15, 2010, with WWME serving as its flagship station, and by effect, effectively became an owned-and-operated station of the national network. Concurrently, WMEU reincorporated comedy series into its schedule, resulting in both stations once again maintaining identical formats – albeit with other programming as the national MeTV network focuses on series from the 1950s to the 1970s while WMEU's MeToo format continued to offer series from the 1980s to the 2000s on its schedule, in addition to older programs.

On December 15, 2010, WCIU moved its simulcast of WWME to digital subchannel 26.3 in preparation for the January 1 launch of "The U Too", a general entertainment programming service that replaced the WWME simulcast on digital channel 26.2. In concurrence with the launch of The U Too, PSIP channel 48.1 was deleted (to be later used by the digital signal of WMEU-CA), while 23.1 reverted to being the virtual channel number for WWME-CA (23.2 was also discontinued, but WWME restored that subchannel with the addition of Bounce TV upon the network's September 2011 launch as part of affiliation agreement with Weigel Broadcasting).

== Technical information ==
=== Subchannels ===
The station's digital signal is multiplexed:

Subchannels of WWME-CD
Subchannel	Res.	Short name	Programming
23.1	720p	MeTV	MeTV
23.2	720p	H&I	Heroes & Icons
23.12	480i	EMLW	OnTV4U

==== WWME-CD2 ====
As part of an affiliation agreement between the network and Weigel Broadcasting (which also included Milwaukee sister station WBME-TV), the station began carrying Bounce TV on digital subchannel 23.2 when it launched on September 26, 2011. On September 29, 2014, WWME-CD2 disaffiliated from Bounce TV to become a charter affiliate of Heroes & Icons, a Weigel-owned network focusing primarily on classic drama and action series.

=== Analog-to digital transition ===
On March 11, 2008, WWME signed on its digital signal on UHF channel 39, becoming the first low-power television station in the Chicago market to operate a digital signal. From early 2009 to December 2010, the station's full-power simulcast on WCIU-DT was also mapped as virtual channel 23.1, while WWME-CA was mapped to virtual channel 23.2 to prevent channel duplication.

WWME-CA replaced the simulcast of WCIU's main channel on its analog signal on January 10, 2011, in favor of carrying a simulcast of WCIU's "The U Too" subchannel (which was otherwise carried on digital subchannel 26.2). In September 2013, with the upgrade of "The U Too"'s programming to high definition (as shown on WMEU-CD channel 48.1), the WWME analog signal was shifted to a simulcast of WCIU's "MeToo" service on digital subchannel 26.4; the analog simulcast of MeToo ended on January 7, 2015, with the analog signal never broadcasting any programming as a result until March 2015, when the analog signal began carrying programming from Heroes & Icons. The future of UHF channel 23 is uncertain, as a spectrum incentive auction for U.S. broadcast television stations is currently scheduled for mid-2016. WWME-CA would have been required to shut down its analog transmitter on September 1, 2015, in any event, as the FCC's since-delayed digital transition for low-power stations did not affect Class A-licensed stations.

WWME-CA shut down its analog signal on January 7, 2015. No termination notification campaign was produced as was done in 2009, as it was assumed most viewers had made the transition years before to WWME's digital signal with the full-power analog transition.

==== Analog nightlight programming ====
On June 12, 2009, WWME converted its analog signal into a simulcast of full-power sister station WCIU-TV, in order to provide an analog nightlight signal following the digital television transition. From June 13 to July 12, 2009, WWME also carried simulcasts of morning and early evening newscasts from NBC owned-and-operated station WMAQ-TV (channel 5), along with the 9:00 p.m. newscast from WCIU's sports broadcast partner WGN-TV (channel 9), except on nights when WGN aired sports telecasts. The regular MeTV schedule continued to air on WCIU-TV digital channel 26.3 and WWME-LD 23.1 (digital channel 39).
