= Elaine Mulqueen =

American actress

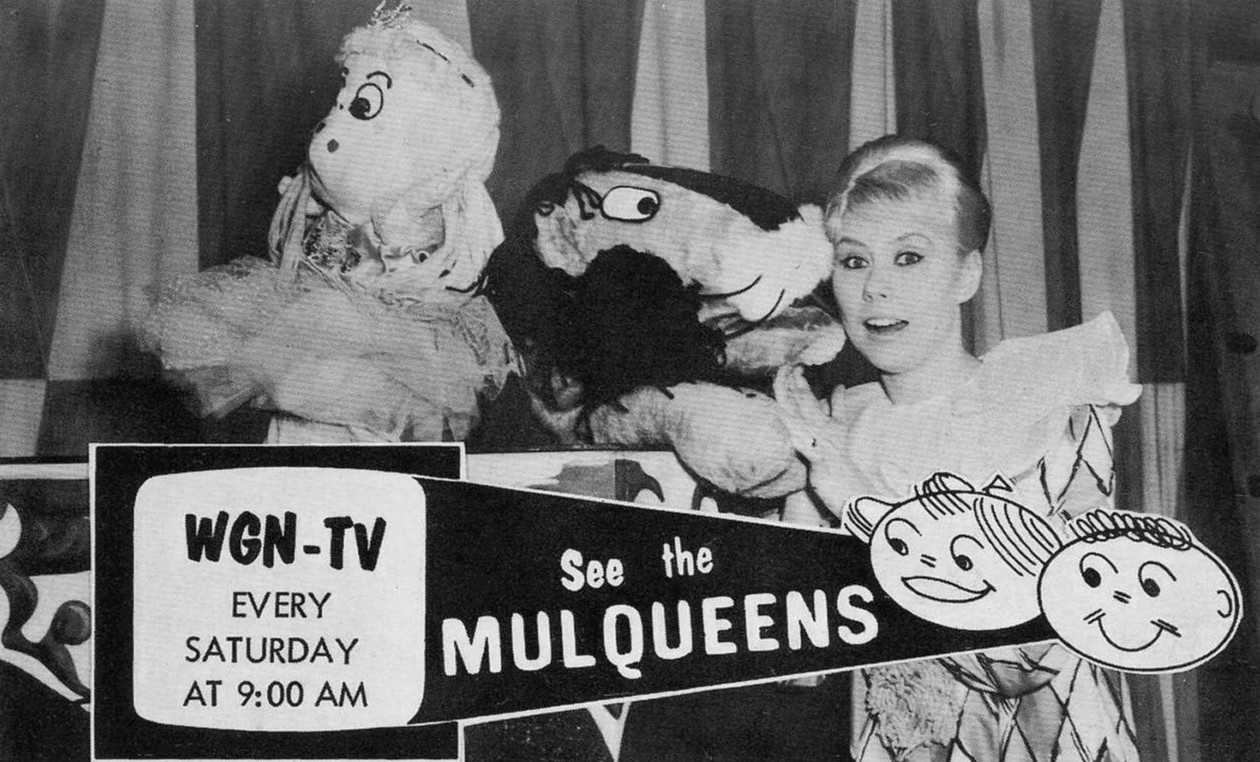
Elaine Mulqueen as Pandora

Elaine Mulqueen (January 27, 1932 – May 22, 2012) was an American children's television host and personality in Chicago, Illinois.

== Career ==
Mulqueen's career in television began in 1962, when she appeared in commercials for Coca-Cola on Bozo's Circus, while her husband, Jack Mulqueen, worked as a puppeteer.

In 1963, Mulqueen and her husband began hosting The Mulqueens on WGN-TV. Mulqueen appeared on stage as a pixie-like character named Pandora. In 1965, the program moved to WBKB-TV (now WLS-TV), and the show was renamed Mulqueen's Kiddie A-Go-Go. Mulqueen continued to host in character as Pandora, while the show now featured live dancing to popular music. In 1966, the program moved to WCIU-TV and its name was shortened to Kiddie A-Go-Go. Several popular musical groups performed on the show, including The Four Seasons and New Colony Six. "Kiddie A-Go-Go" remained on WCIU until 1970.

In 1973, Mulqueen appeared in advertisements for the Chicago-area grocery chain Dominick's.

== Death ==
On May 22, 2012, Mulqueen died of cancer at the age of 80.
