= WMEU-CD =

Television station in Chicago

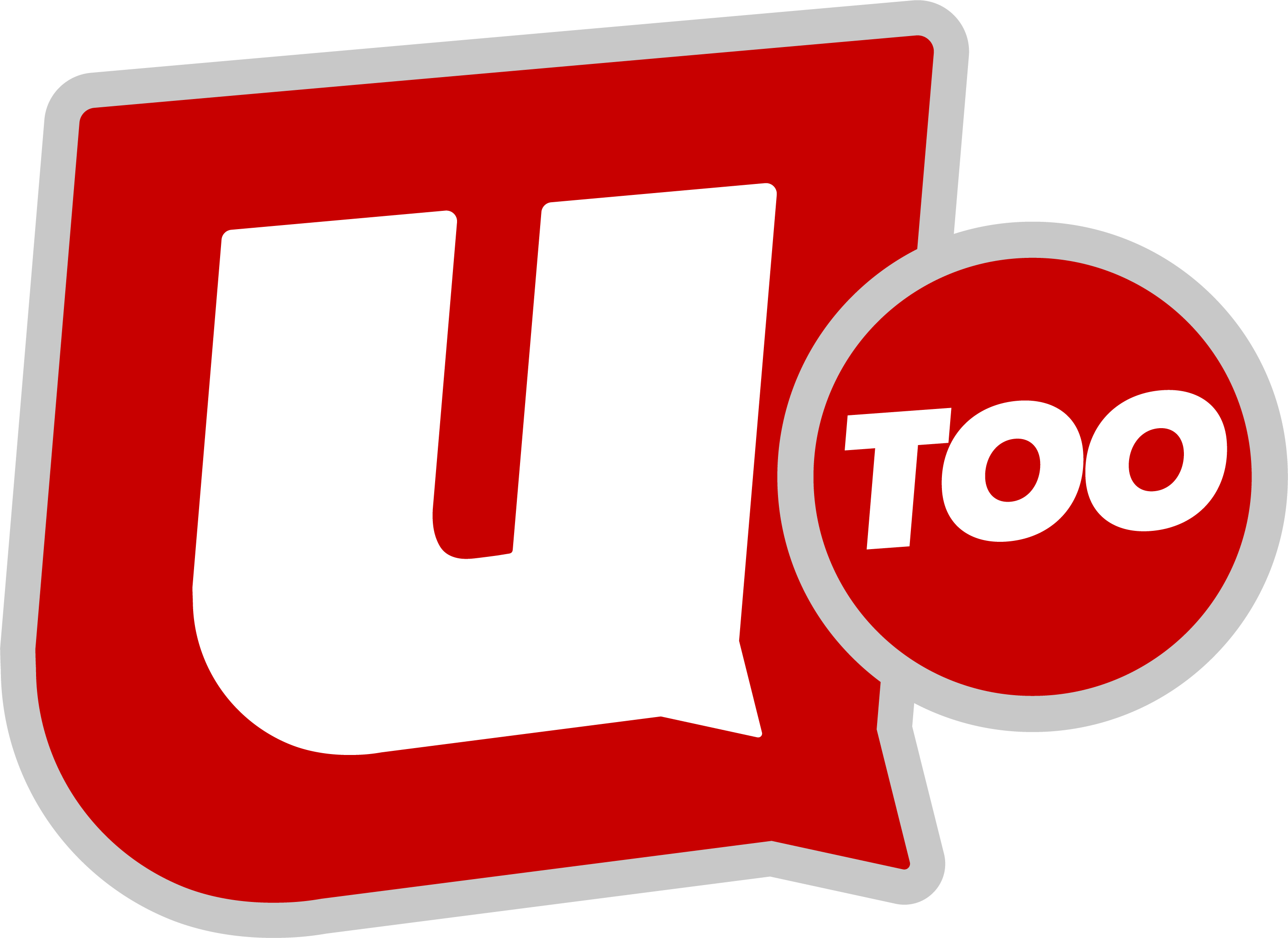
- Chicago, Illinois; United States
- Channels: Digital: 18 (UHF); Virtual: 48
- Branding: The U Too

Programming
- Affiliations: 48.1: Independent; for others, see § Subchannels

Ownership
- Owner: Weigel Broadcasting; (Weigel Broadcasting Co.)
- Sister stations: TV: WCIU-TV; WWME-CD; Radio: WRME-LD

History
- Founded: October 28, 1987
- Former call signs: W54AP (1987–2004); W48DD (2004–2005); WFBT-CA (2005–2008); WMEU-CA (2008–2010); WCUU-CA (September–November 2010)
- Former channel numbers: Analog: 54 (UHF, 1987–2004), 48 (UHF, 2004–2014); Digital: 32 (UHF, 2012–2019)
- Former affiliations: EWTN (1990s)
- Call sign meaning: Disambiguation of sister stations WWME ("Memorable Entertainment") and WCIU (known as "The U")

Technical information
- Licensing authority: FCC
- Facility ID: 168662
- Class: CD
- ERP: 15 kW
- HAAT: 474 m (1,555 ft); 475 m (1,558 ft) (CP)
- Transmitter coordinates: 41°52′44.1″N 87°38′10.2″W
- Translator(s): WCIU-TV 26.2 Chicago

Links
- Public license information: Public file; LMS
- Website: www.wciu.com

WMEU-CD (channel 48) is a low-power, Class A independent television station in Chicago, Illinois, United States. It is owned by locally based Weigel Broadcasting alongside fellow Weigel flagship properties, independent station WCIU-TV (channel 26) and MeTV outlet WWME-CD (channel 23). The three stations share studios on Halsted Street (between Washington Boulevard and Madison Street) in the Greektown neighborhood; WMEU-CD's transmitter is located atop the Willis Tower on South Wacker Drive in the Chicago Loop.

Even though WMEU operates a digital signal of its own, the low-power broadcasting radius does not reach the outer ring of Chicago proper or surrounding suburbs. Therefore, the station can also be seen through a 720p high definition simulcast on WCIU-TV's second digital subchannel in order to reach the entire market. This signal can be seen on channel 26.2, broadcasting from the Willis Tower transmitter. Additionally, until February 2024, CBS Television Stations contracted with Weigel to simulcast the subchannels of WBBM-TV over-the-air over WMEU-CD, which gave viewers within the inner ring of Chicago access to that station via UHF, due to the limitations of WBBM's main channel 12 VHF signal. That feed has since been replaced with a simulcast of Weigel-owned Catchy Comedy, which airs on WCIU 26.6, following WBBM-TV's transition to ATSC 3.0 and channel 2.1 being now simulcast on WGN-TV at ATSC 1.0.

== History ==
=== Early history ===
The station first signed on the air on October 28, 1987, as W54AP, originally broadcasting on UHF channel 54. In the late 1990s, it became an affiliate of the Eternal Word Television Network. The station moved to UHF channel 48 in 2004, and changed its callsign to W48DD.

On January 1, 2005, the station's callsign was changed to WFBT-CA and adopted an ethnic programming format called "FBT" (Foreign-language Broadcast Television); the FBT format originated on WWME-CA (channel 23), which previously held the WFBT-CA call letters from 2001 to 2004, shortly after that station expanded the block of classic television series it began airing one year earlier in January 2003 (including many series that previously aired on WCIU-TV) into a 24-hour format called "MeTV".

=== Conversion to classic television format as "MeToo" ===
WMEU's logo as "MeToo", used from 2008 to 2013.

On March 1, 2008, channel 48 adopted a new programming format as "MeToo", serving as an extension of WWME's MeTV classic television format; accordingly, the station changed its callsign to WMEU-CA. The ethnic programming that was dropped by WMEU returned to WCIU through the launch of a new locally programmed service called "FBT" on digital subchannel 26.6 (FBT was dropped on December 1, 2010, and was replaced by a simulcast of WCIU-TV until the subchannel was removed on December 15). Prime time feature films were added to the station's schedule on June 30, 2008, when WMEU-CA debuted Me-Too's Movie Classics, which showcased classic films from the 1950s to the 1970s without editing – outside of necessary removal of inappropriate content – at 7 p.m. each weeknight. In an effort to streamline the schedules of both MeTV stations, on September 14, 2009, WMEU's MeToo schedule was restructured to feature only dramatic series and films and the MeTV schedule on WWME was reformatted to feature mainly comedic series.

The station's call letters changed to WCUU-CA on September 22, 2010; however, just a month and a half later on November 5, they reverted to the prior WMEU-CA calls. On December 15, WMEU added comedy programming to its schedule, coinciding with MeTV's expansion into a nationally distributed television network (WWME became the flagship station of the national MeTV network, as well as an owned-and-operated station). As a result, both WWME and WMEU once again maintained identical formats, albeit with different programming from the national MeTV network (which focuses mainly on series from the 1950s to the 1970s) as WMEU/MeToo continued to incorporate series from the 1980s to the 2000s onto its schedule, in addition to programs from prior decades. The WMEU/MeToo simulcast on WCIU's signal moved to that station's 26.4 subchannel with the format change. In addition, This TV moved to WCIU subchannel 26.5.

On January 5, 2011, virtual channel 48.1 was temporarily discontinued while 23.1 reverted to being the virtual channel number for WWME-CA (23.2 was discontinued at that time, but later returned as an affiliate of Bounce TV). On April 24, 2012, WMEU-CA filed an application to transfer its Class A status from its analog allotment to its digital frequency. On April 30, the call letters for the digital signal were changed to WMEU-CD, while the analog channel's calls became WMEU-LP.

=== Switch to "The U Too" ===
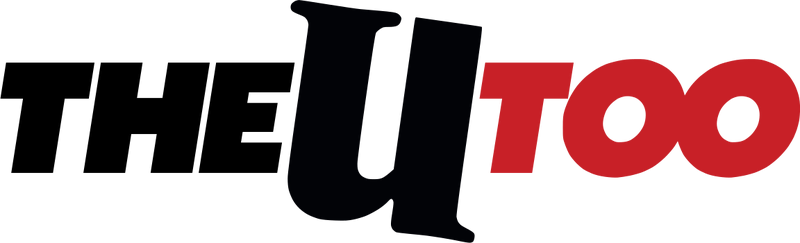
"The U Too" logo, 2013–2017

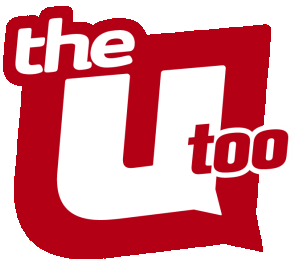
"The U Too" logo, 2017–2019

In September 2013, WMEU dropped the MeToo format (which moved to WWME analog channel 23, while continuing to air on WCIU digital subchannel 26.4 until it was replaced by Heroes & Icons on December 29, 2014). Digital channel 48.1 began running a high-definition feed of "The U Too", a general entertainment service which originated as a subchannel-only service on WCIU digital subchannel 26.2 on January 5, 2011 (replacing the WWME simulcast, which moved to WCIU digital subchannel 26.3 on December 15, 2010) and continued to be transmitted in 16:9 standard definition widescreen on that channel until it was upgraded to 720p high definition at some point during 2018.

=== CW affiliation on WCIU-TV, and temporary move of "The U" branding to WMEU-CD ===
Logo as "The U", 2019–2024

On April 18, 2019, Weigel Broadcasting signed an agreement with CBS Corporation through which WCIU-TV would take over as The CW's Chicago-area affiliate, while shifting syndicated programs that it either currently features on or has acquired with the intent of including in its prime time lineup to "The U Too" carried on WMEU and simulcast on WCIU-DT2. WCIU's main signal took on the branding of "CW 26", while WMEU-CD took on the main signal's former branding of "The U" on September 1. WMEU-CD also became the flagship of the Illinois High School Association network, taking over from NBC Sports Chicago. WMEU-CD carries a game of the week, along with the IHSA's football and girls' and boys' basketball championships.

The rebranding was reverted on August 1, 2024, as WCIU, ahead of ending its CW affiliation and reverting to an independent station the following month, would reclaim the "U" branding, and WMEU concurrently reclaimed its previous "U Too" branding, with no other changes in format or programming.

== Programming ==
=== Sports programming ===
In 2008, WMEU began carrying Big East Conference basketball games supplied by ESPN Plus, allowing the station to carry certain DePaul Blue Demons game telecasts (most of those games moved to "The U Too", when it launched on WCIU-TV digital subchannel 26.2 in January 2011). In addition, WMEU also broadcast sporting events from the Chicago Public High School League.

On May 21, 2013, Weigel reached a broadcast agreement with the Chicago Sky to carry the WNBA team's games on "The U Too". Subsequently, on October 1, 2013, Weigel and the Chicago Wolves reached a deal to allow "The U Too" to serve as the over-the-air broadcaster for the AHL hockey team. The station carries most Wolves games, except for select matches that are subject to be moved to WCIU-TV. The station began broadcasting all of its Wolves and Sky game telecasts in high-definition beginning with the team's respective 2014 seasons. On October 1, 2014, it was announced that Weigel reached an agreement to carry select games from the inaugural season of the Fall Experimental Football League on WMEU-CD, during October and November.

== Technical information ==
=== Subchannels ===
The station's signal is multiplexed:

Subchannels of WMEU-CD
Subchannel	Res.	Short name	Programming
48.1	720p	U Too	Main WMEU-CD programming
48.2	720p	START	Start TV (WBBM-TV)
48.3	720p	CATCHY	Catchy Comedy (WCIU-TV)
48.4	480i	MeTV+	MeTV+

Simulcast of subchannels of another station

In early 2010, WMEU-CA filed an application with the Federal Communications Commission to operate a companion digital signal on UHF channel 46. However, due to possible interference with the digital signal of WHME-TV in South Bend, Indiana, on that same channel, WMEU later applied to move to UHF channel 32, which was formerly occupied by the analog signal of Fox owned-and-operated station WFLD. On June 8, 2010, the station was granted a construction permit to build its digital transmitter. The license to cover for WMEU's digital signal was approved by the FCC on June 13, 2011; the station signed on its digital signal one month later on July 11, under the call sign WMEU-CD. However, since WMEU-CD's signal does not cover the entire Chicago market, WCIU continues to simulcast WMEU's programming on digital subchannel 26.2.

In addition to its carriage on digital subchannel 48.2, WMEU simulcast TouchVision in a letterboxed format on its analog channel 48 signal from September 29, 2014, to January 14, 2016.

In July 2024, the fifth subchannel began broadcasting test videos using the HEVC codec in 1080p format. Typically, only newer TVs and devices that support 4K video will currently support it. The second subchannel reverted to MPEG-2, and the third subchannel was reduced to 480i.
