= Greeks in Chicago =

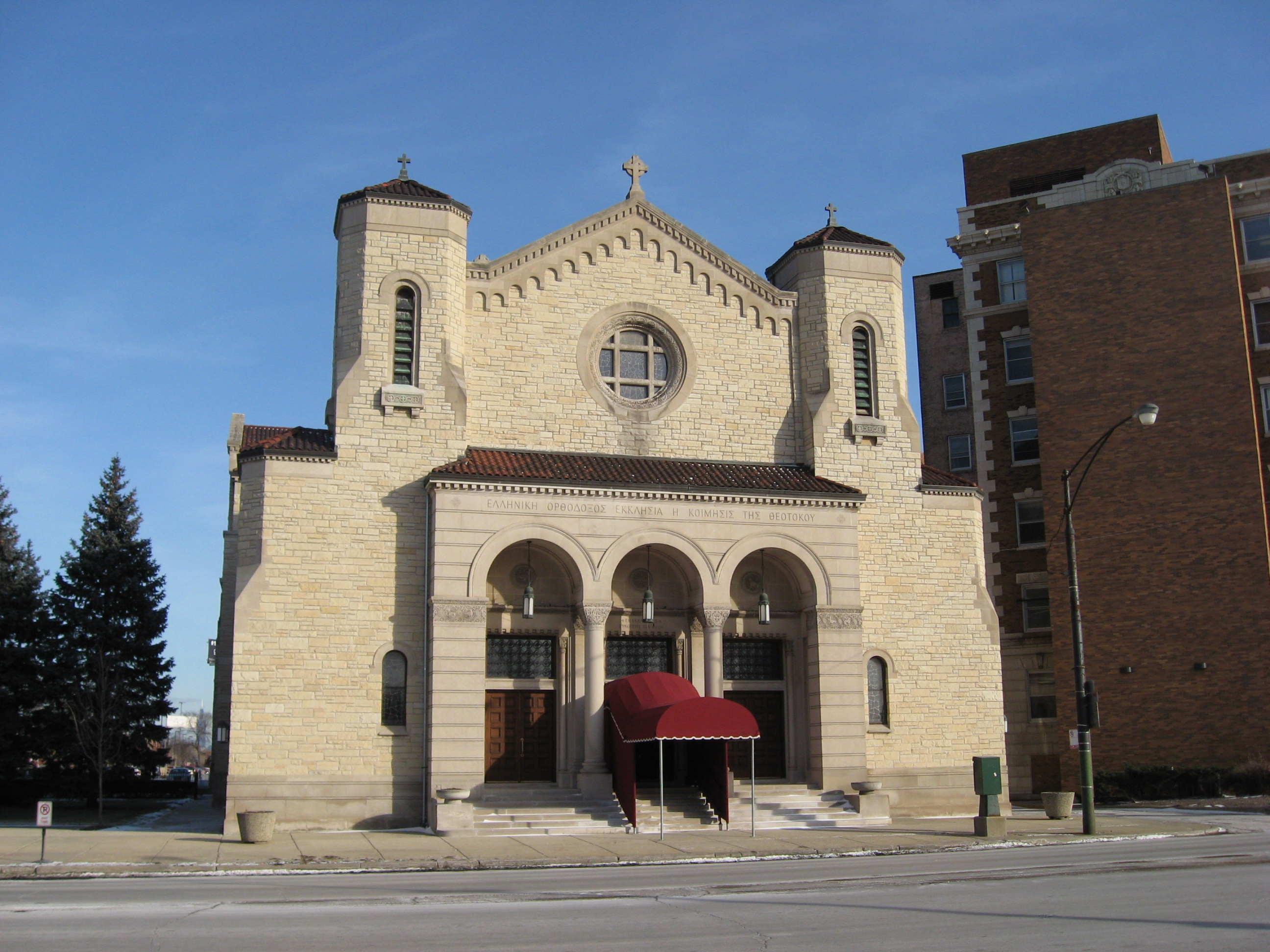
Greek Orthodox church in Chicago

It is estimated that 85,000 people of Greek ancestry live in the greater Chicago area. Of these, approximately 10,000 were born in Greece, making Chicago the second biggest destination for Greek immigrants in the US after New York.

== History ==
Greek immigration to Chicago began in the 1840s and accelerated after the Great Chicago Fire of 1871. By 1882, approximately 1,000 Greeks, primarily Laconia and Arcadia, lived in Chicago.

Greek immigrants initially settled near their workplaces, primarily on the Near West Side. By the 1920s, Greeks dominated Chicago's restaurant, ice cream, floral, and produce industries.

By 1930, Chicago’s Greektown had approximately 30,000 residents of Greek descent. Greek communities also formed on Chicago's South Side in Woodlawn, South Shore, and Pullman; on the West Side in Austin; and on the North Side in Lincoln Square.

In the 1950s and 60s, much of Greektown was demolished and its residents displaced by the construction of the Congress Expressway and the University of Illinois Chicago, leading to the dispersion of its Greek community, which was further compounded by white flight from other Greek communities.

== See also ==
- Greektown, Chicago
- Greek Orthodox Metropolis of Chicago
