= TouchVision =

Defunct digital media company

- Type: Defunct Digital broadcast television network; Defunct online Video on Demand; (news)
- Country: United States
- Headquarters: Chicago, Illinois
- Owner: Think Televisual
- Key people: Lee Abrams (co-founder/chief content officer); Brandon Davis (co-founder/chief executive officer); Steven Saslow co-founder/ chief executive officer
- Launch date: September 16, 2013; 11 years ago
- Dissolved: January 14, 2016; 9 years ago

TouchVision was an American digital broadcast and internet Video on demand television network that was owned by Think Televisual. The service provided rolling news coverage that was distributed to television, mobile and tablet platforms. TouchVision's operations were based in the headquarters of Weigel Broadcasting in Chicago, Illinois.

== History ==
TouchVision was co-founded by former radio consultant and XM Satellite Radio executive Lee Abrams (chief content officer), Steven A. Saslow (original chief executive officer) and Brandon Davis (chief executive officer).

The service launched in beta form on July 1, 2013, on CBS affiliate WDJT-TV in Milwaukee, Wisconsin (owned by Weigel Broadcasting) over its fourth digital subchannel, replacing a time-purchased real estate listings service that was programmed by local realtor Shorewest Realtors. The service officially launched on September 16, 2013. In early November of that year, WDJT sister station WMEU-CD in Chicago began carrying TouchVision on its second digital subchannel.

TouchVision gained its first syndicated client outside of the Weigel properties in December 2014, when WISH-TV in Indianapolis, Indiana began carrying a half-hour broadcast of the service on weekday mornings (serving as both a lead-in for WISH's local morning newscast and, as a result of the then-pending loss of its CBS affiliation to WTTV, a replacement for the CBS Morning News); the TouchVision simulcast began airing on WISH when it became a CW affiliate on January 1, 2015. Weigel's Heroes & Icons network also carried the 6 a.m. Eastern hour of programming during its "beta test" period while the schedule was tweaked for its national launch.

WDJT dropped TouchVision from its 58.4 subchannel on January 12, 2015, in advance of the soft launch of the classic television network Decades (now Catchy Comedy) (a joint venture between Weigel and CBS Television Stations) that occurred three days later, though it remained available in the Milwaukee market via sister independent station WMLW-TV, which carried an hour-long simulcast of the service on weekday mornings.

TouchVision ended all on-air operations on January 14, 2016. Programming ceased at 11:59 PM CT on January 14, 2016. The network's YouTube channel was taken off-line voluntarily in mid-May 2016, with the rights to stories and segments reverting to the network's former contributors.

== Format and distribution ==
TouchVision was aimed at a demographic of young adults dubbed by the service as the "Millennials Plus" generation (those between the ages of 18 and 35), who grew up using digital technology and have long adapted to social media. TouchVision claimed a collective audience that approached about 1 million viewers each month.

=== Over the Air ===
TouchVision was broadcast 24 hours a day in a widescreen format, presenting national and international news in a format similar to a newsreel, using pictures and video footage – mainly adapted from wire services – presented without any on-air anchors; it also provided other news content such as local weather and sports score cut-ins and original feature segments, including social commentary presented by Felonious Munk. A window was provided for a few minutes before the top of the hour, allowing the local station to insert a locally produced news capsule or weather update. The network also aired a half-hour "week in review" program intended to summarize the network's best segments of the week and introduce the network on the affiliate's main station. Weigel's newly launched network Heroes & Icons began carrying an hour-long daily morning simulcast of TouchVision's programming service, and was televised on a semi-national basis from September 29, 2014, to January 14, 2016.

=== Online and Mobile ===
The service was available as a linear television channel, on its apps for smartphones and tablet computers, and a dedicated website. Through a location setting based on zip code or browser location sharing, the network's feed was also available real-time and with limited DVR-style controls through the network's website and apps for the iOS App Store and Google Play depending upon proximity to an affiliate. All of the networks segment videos could also be viewed on its website, apps, YouTube channel as well as on Facebook.

== See also ==
- NewsNet - an all-news channel for digital broadcast television with a 30-minute newswheel
- Euronews - similarly formatted news channel in Europe
- Independent Network News – a syndicated national news program for independent stations, which ran from 1980 to 1990.
- Independent News Network – a production company (not to be confused with Independent Network News) specializing in producing newscasts for television stations without an in-house news department.
- AJ+ - A digital, online news content provider
