= Halsted Street =

Major north–south street in Chicago, Illinois, U.S.

- 800 West
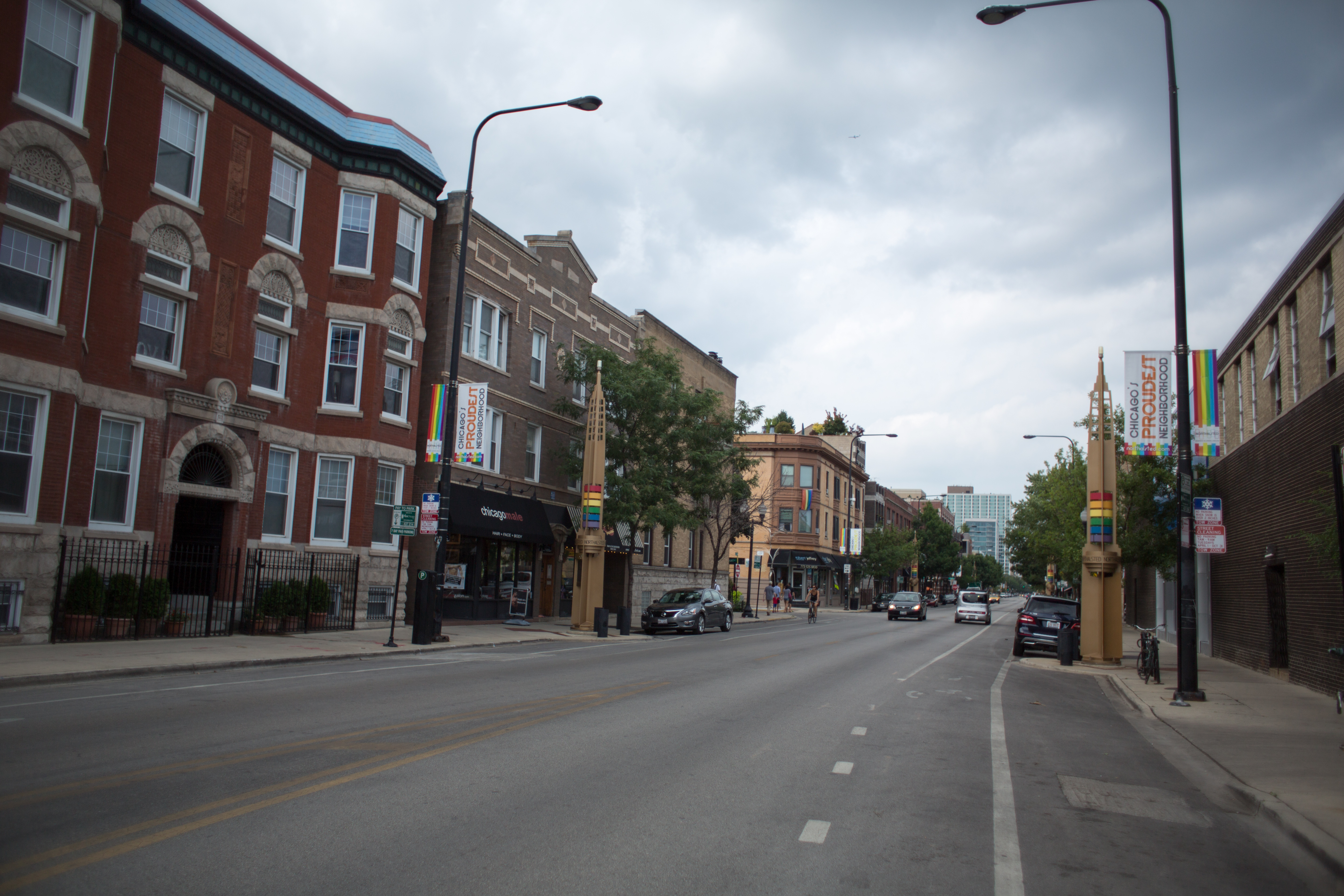
- North Halsted, Chicago in 2015
- Interactive map of Halsted Street
- Former name: 8th Avenue
- Part of: IL 1 from Route 1 Cutoff / Parkside Avenue in Chicago Heights to I-57 in Washington Heights, Chicago
- Location: Chicago Heights–Chicago, Illinois, United States
- South end: 26th Street in Chicago Heights
- Major junctions: US 30 in Chicago Heights; IL 1 in Chicago Heights; I-80 Toll / I-290 Toll in East Hazel Crest; US 6 in Harvey; IL 83 in Harvey; I-57 / IL 1 in Washington Heights, Chicago; US 12 / US 20 in Washington Heights, Chicago
- North end: Grace Street at Broadway (3800 North) in Lake View, Chicago

Halsted Street is a major north–south street in the U.S. city of Chicago, Illinois.

== Location ==
In Chicago's grid system, Halsted Street marks 800 West, 1 mile (1.6 km) west of State Street, from Grace Street (3800 N) in Lakeview south to the city limits at the Little Calumet River (13000 S) in West Pullman, a length of 168 north-south Chicago blocks. (From Grace north to Lawrence Avenue (4800 N) in Uptown, 800 W is marked by Clarendon Avenue.)

== Route description ==
=== North Side ===
In Lakeview Halsted passes through Wrigleyville, as intersecting with Addison Street, it is only two blocks east of Wrigley Field home of the Chicago Cubs. Halsted is then lined with restaurants, bars and gay bars and clubs as one enters Boystown, Chicago's main gay and lesbian community, running as far as Belmont Avenue. This area also contains numerous theaters and comedy clubs. As it continues south past Diversey (2800 N), it goes past DePaul University and through the Lincoln Park area, as a primary thoroughfare through the community area. South of Armitage Avenue, it passes two notable theaters: Steppenwolf and the Royal George.

At North Avenue, Halsted passes Clybourn Avenue, through the Old Town area. The former site of the Cabrini–Green housing project is at Halsted and Division (1200 N) in the Near North Side neighborhood. Halsted Street has two bridges to mark its passage over Goose Island; it is one of only two streets to completely traverse this, the Chicago River's only island.

=== Near West ===
Continuing south, Halsted soars high above feeder ramps to the Kennedy Expressway, Union Pacific Railroad and Canadian National Railway and finally the Kennedy Expressway itself to enter the West Loop. One then passes through Chicago's Greektown at Jackson Blvd (300 S). South of a high bridge over the Eisenhower Expressway, Halsted forms the eastern border of the University of Illinois at Chicago. North of Greektown is the headquarters for Weigel Broadcasting (owner of MeTV) and its local television stations (WCIU-TV, WWME-CD, and WMEU-CD), which are appropriately addressed at 26 N. Halsted Street, to honor WCIU-TV's channel number.

The Jane Addams Hull House, America's first settlement house, was located at Polk (800 S) and Halsted. The "Hull House Neighborhood," which was served by the Jane Addams settlement house, consisted of recently arrived immigrants at the turn of the 20th century.

Taylor Street (1000 S) was the port-of-call for Chicago's Italian American immigrants and became known as Chicago's Little Italy. Italians were the only ethnic group that remained after the exodus of Jews, Greeks, Irish, etc. that began shortly before the Great Depression of the 1930s. Greektown and Maxwell Street business establishments continue to exist as remnants of the mass emigration of Southern Europeans, terminated by an act of Congress in 1924.

South of an underpass allowing Halsted to cross the BNSF Railway tracks at 16th street, parallel to the Dan Ryan Expressway, Halsted grazes the eastern edge of the Pilsen neighborhood, then crosses the Chicago River's south branch.

=== South Side and south suburbs ===
Here Halsted Street enters Bridgeport, traditionally a working-class Irish, Lithuanian and Italian community, it has been home to five of the city's mayors. Continuing south, Halsted passes between the borders of Back of the Yards, which lies to the west side of Halsted from 40th to 55th Streets, and Canaryville, which lies on the east side of Halsted between 40th and 49th Streets. Both Canaryville and Back of the Yards historically housed many Union Stock Yards workers. The Stockyards themselves were located to the west of Halsted between Pershing (39th) and 47th. Further south, Halsted Street passes into Englewood. Kennedy-King College has its campus in the heart of Englewood at 63rd Street and Halsted Street. Further south, Halsted intersects with 71st Street, which was honorarily named for Emmett Till, a victim of the violence of white supremacy in the United States. Just south of 95th Street is the Carter G. Woodson regional branch of the Chicago Public Library. Illinois Route 1 begins at Halsted Street's interchange with Interstate 57 (at 99th Street) on the far south side, and follows Halsted through much of its length through the suburbs.

Leaving Chicago and entering the village of Riverdale at the Little Calumet River near 129th St, Route 1 breaks off and is called Chicago Road, then Dixie Highway, ending at the Ohio River, at the border with the state of Kentucky. Halsted Street continues through downtown Chicago Heights and crosses the Lincoln Highway. The road ends at 26th Street at the Chicago Heights–Steger line. However, Halsted Street returns at 30th Street and continues south (marked as Halsted Boulevard south of 34th Street) before ending at 37th Street in Steger.

== Public transportation ==
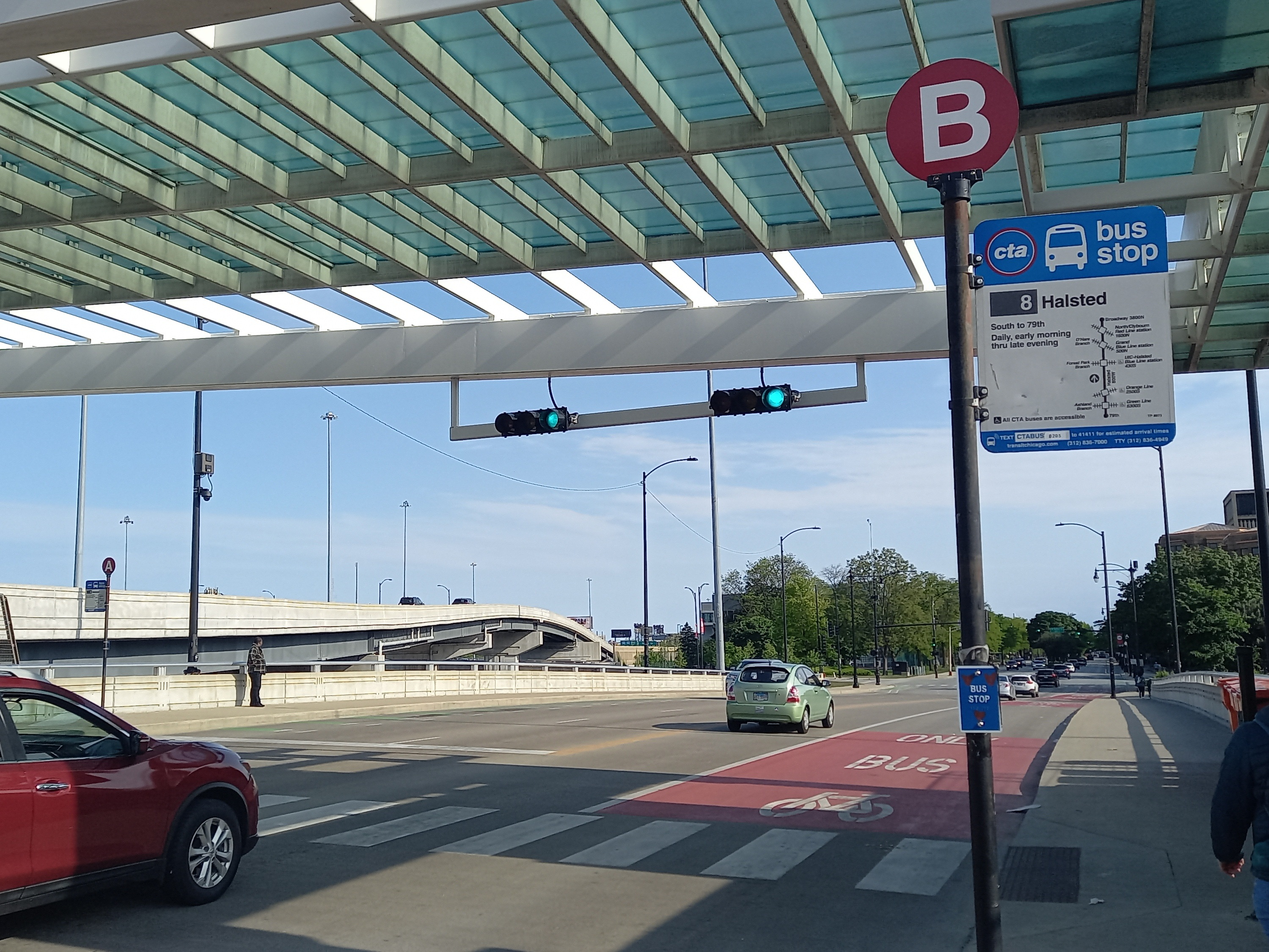
CTA bus stop at the Halsted Street entrance of UIC–Halsted station

Halsted Street is served by major transportation lines.

On the Chicago "L", the Red, Brown, and Purple Lines run nearby on the North Side. Stations along Halsted Street appear on the Red Line (North/Clybourn), the Blue Line (Grand and UIC–Halsted), the Green Line (Halsted at 63rd Street), and the Orange Line (Halsted at Archer Avenue). Three Metra commuter lines directly serve Halsted Street: the BNSF Line (Halsted Street station at 16th Street), the Rock Island Line (Gresham station at 87th Street), and the Blue Island branch of the Metra Electric District (West Pullman station at 121st Street).

Three CTA bus routes provide service along Halsted Street: 8 Halsted between Broadway/Waveland and 79th Street, 8A South Halsted between the 79th Red Line station and Halsted/119th (with select trips continuing to 127th/Lowe), and the 108 Halsted/95th between the 95th/Dan Ryan Red Line terminal and 127th/Lowe. Pace provides suburban bus service along Halsted Street south of 95th Street. The 352 Halsted route operates 24/7 between 95th/Dan Ryan station and the Chicago Heights Bus Terminal in Chicago Heights, Illinois. The bus route serves a major transfer hub at Harvey Transportation Center in Harvey, Illinois. The 359 Robbins/South Kedzie Avenue also runs along Halsted between 95th/Dan Ryan station and 124th Street before turning west.

== Etymology ==
The street derives its name from William H. and Caleb O. Halsted, Philadelphia bankers who made large investments in Chicago real estate through William B. Ogden, Chicago's first mayor. The street ran through their property, and they ceded valuable rights to the city.

Halsted has had several names, originally known as "Egyptian Road" because it led to the Little Egypt area of Illinois, it was subsequently known as First Street, then Dyer Street, after Charles Volney Dyer, a prominent Chicago physician and abolitionist.

== Major Intersections ==
The entire route is in Cook County.

Location	mi	km	Destinations	Notes
Chicago Heights	0.0	0.0	26th Street	Southern terminus
Chicago Heights	1.0	1.6	US 30 (Lincoln Highway)	
Chicago Heights	1.7	2.7	IL 1 south	Southern end of IL 1 concurrency
East Hazel Crest	6.0	9.7	I-80 Toll / I-294 Toll (Tri-State Tollway) – Joliet	I-80/I-294 exit 2
Harvey	7.6	12.2	US 6 (159th Street)	
Harvey	9.2	14.8	IL 83 (147th Street / Sibley Boulevard)	
Chicago	15.5	24.9	I-57 to I-94 IL 1 ends	I-57 exit 357, northern end of IL 1 concurrency
Chicago	16.0	25.7	US 12 / US 20 (95th Street)	
Chicago	26.8	43.1	Jackson Boulevard (Historic US 66)	
Chicago	30.0	48.3	North Avenue (IL 64)	
Chicago	33.6	54.1	Broadway / Grace Street	Northern terminus
1.000 mi = 1.609 km; 1.000 km = 0.621 mi: Concurrency terminus; Tolled
