= Greektown, Chicago =

Neighborhood in Chicago

Coordinates: 41.8792°N 87.6473°W

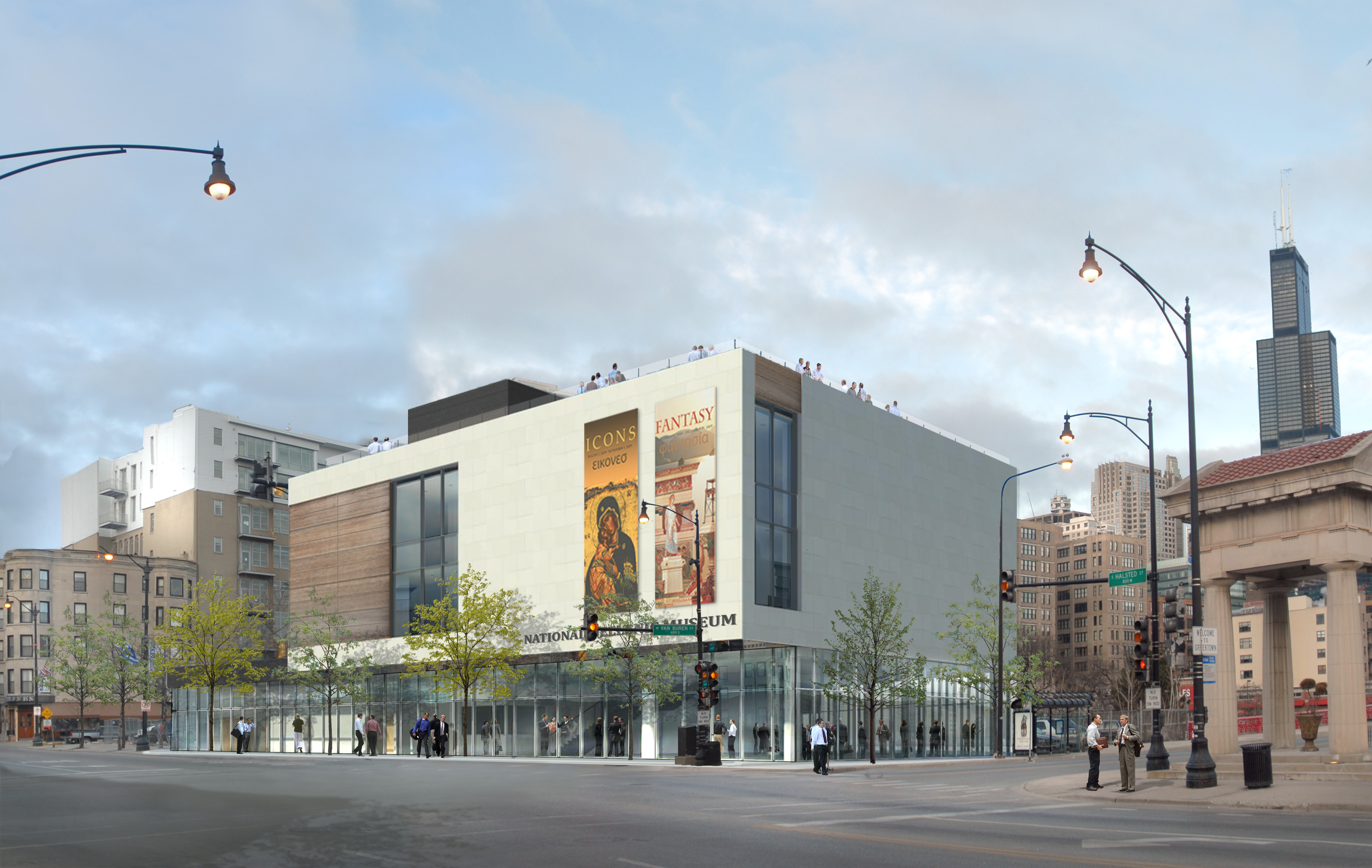
The National Hellenic Museum in Greektown, Chicago

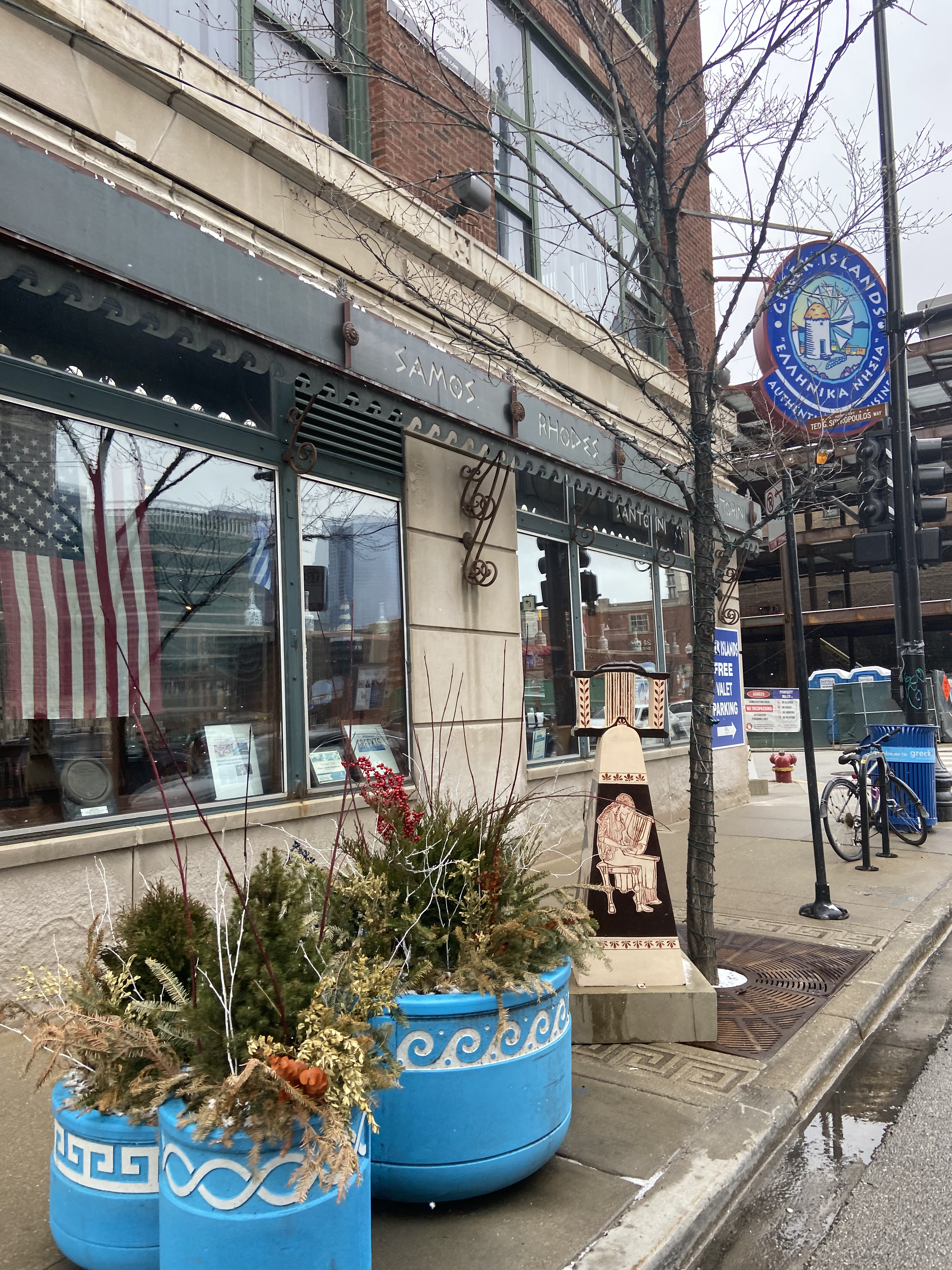
Outside of the restaurant Greek Islands, blue pots painted with famous Greek patterns, such as the Greek key, adorn the sidewalks of Greektown.

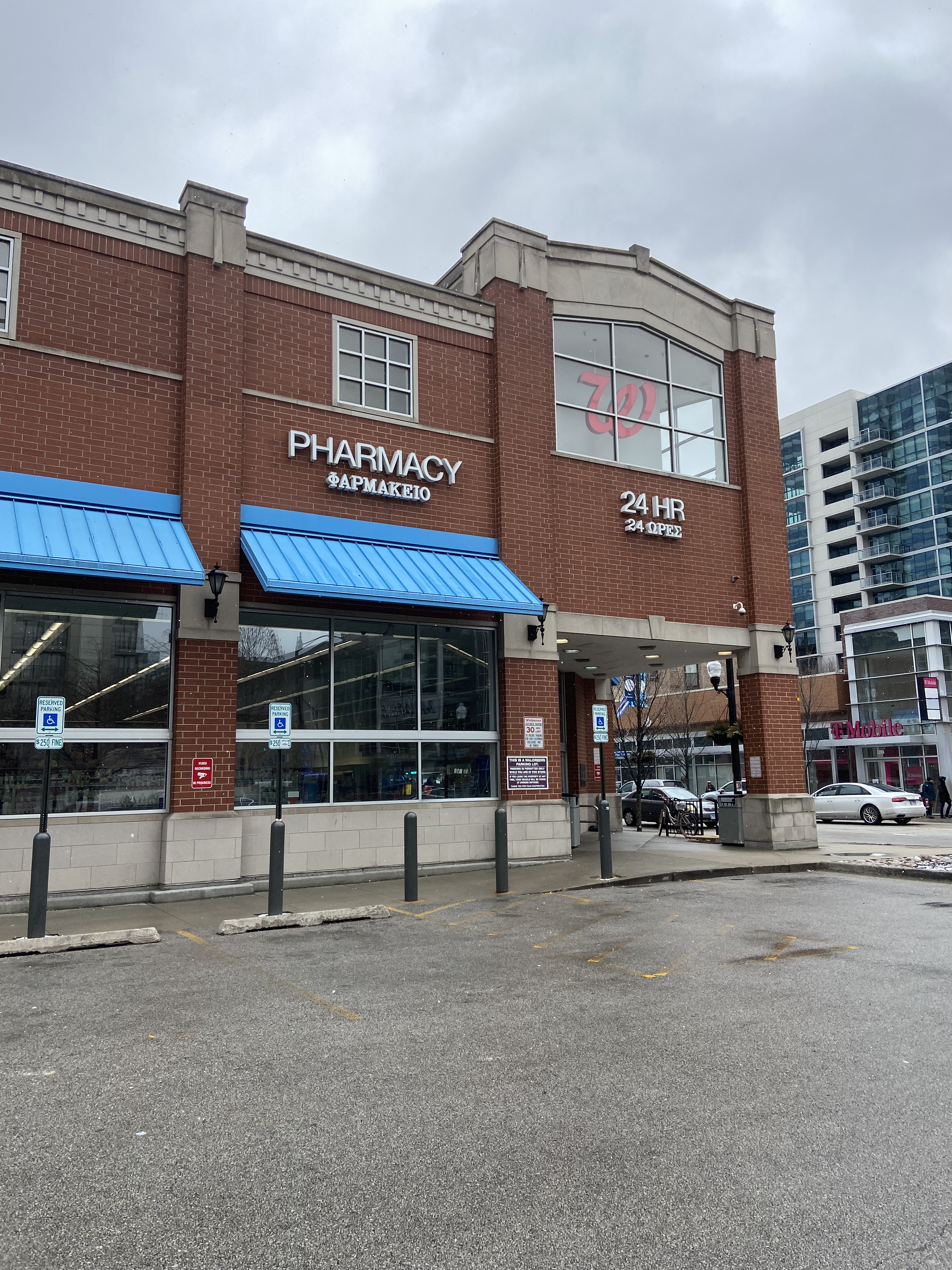
The local Walgreens is ornamented with the addition of Greek translations on the storefront signs.

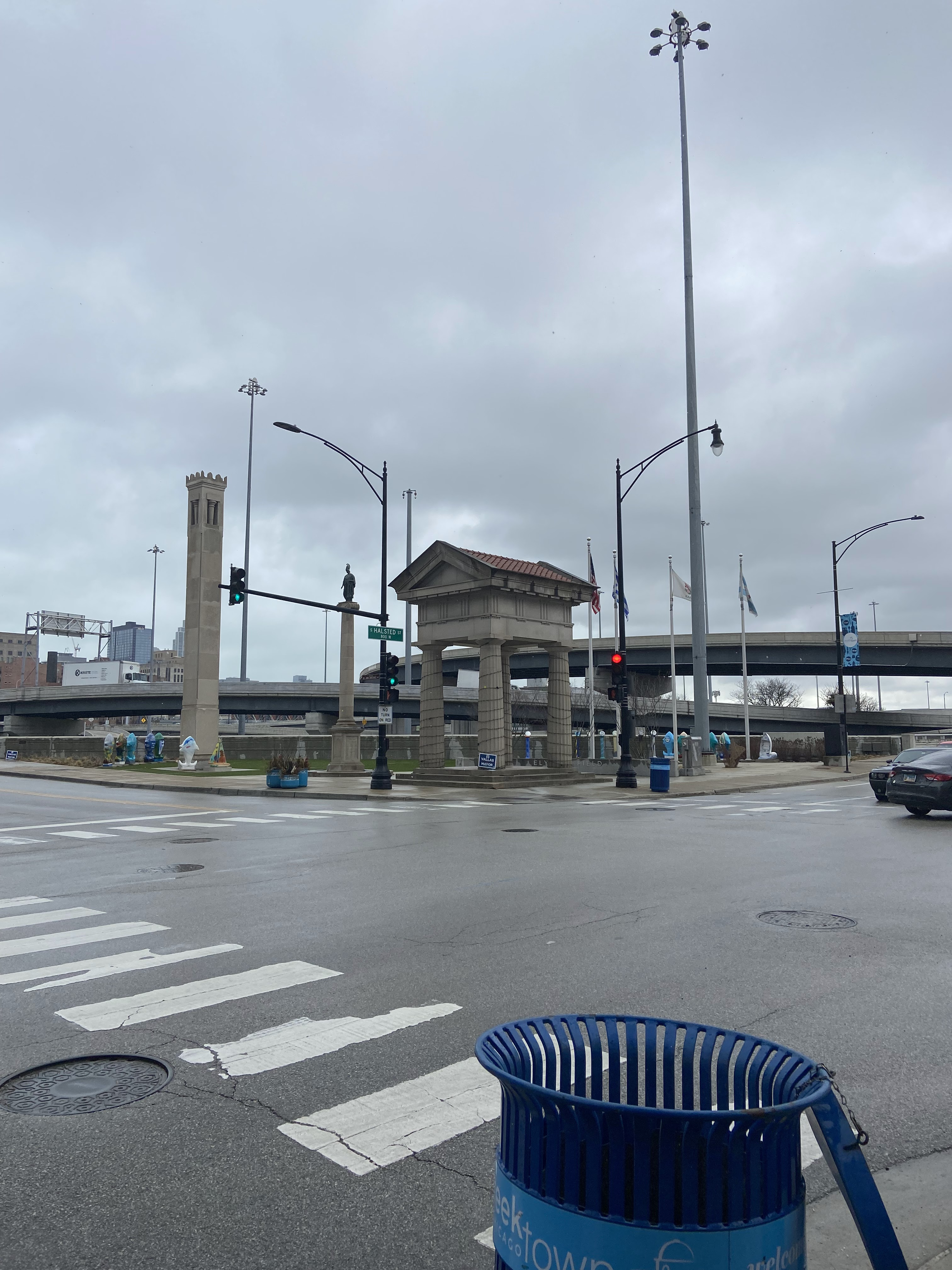
Ancient Greek architecture style monument marks the edge of Greektown. The monument sits in front of the Eisenhower Expressway.

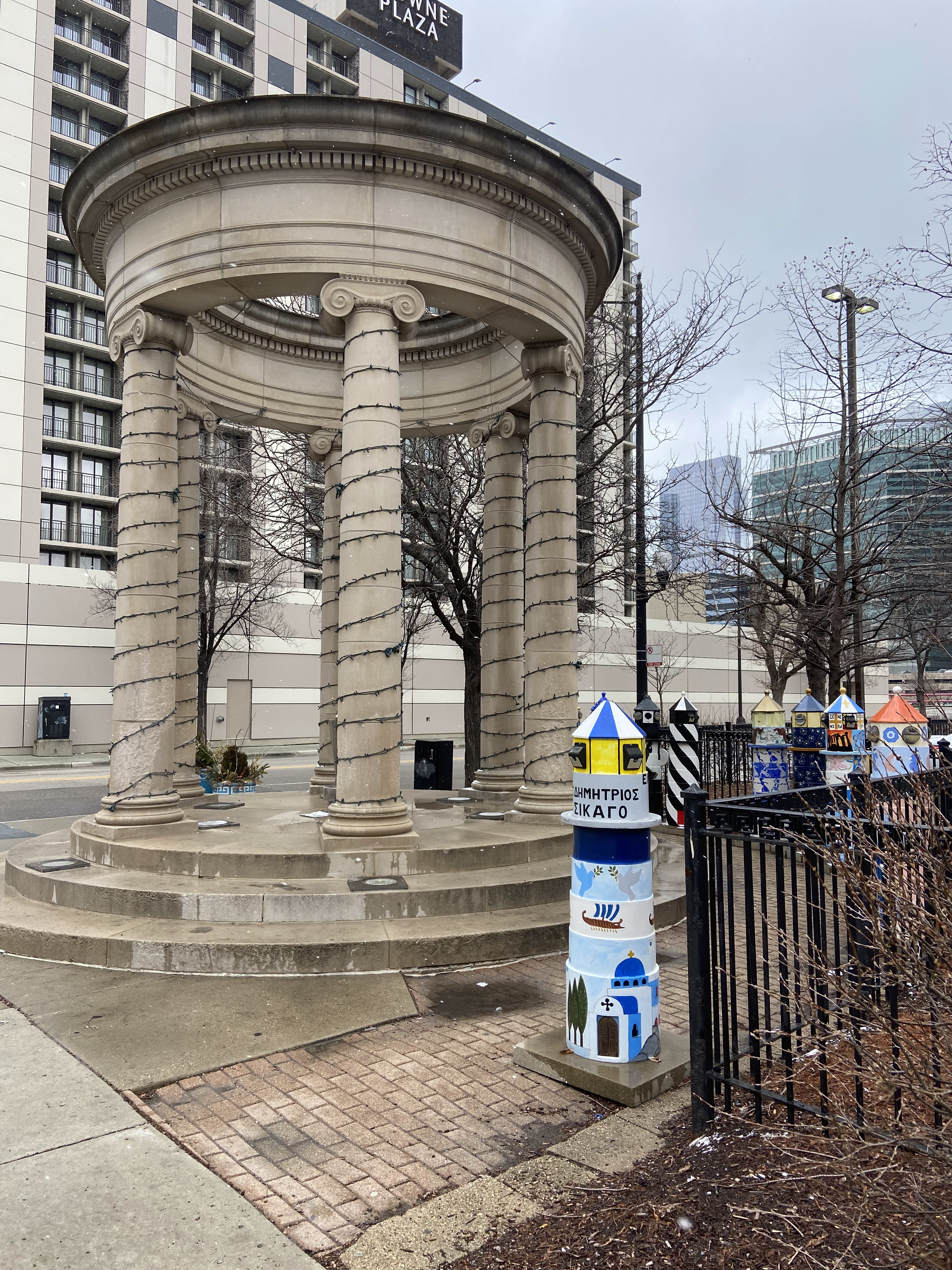
Ancient Greek Architectural style monument marks the beginning of Greektown. It sits at the corner of Halsted and Monroe and is decorated by art from the local Greek Orthodox church's youth.

Greektown is a social and dining district, located on the Near West Side of Chicago. Today, Greektown consists mostly of restaurants and businesses, although a cultural museum and an annual parade and festival still remain in the neighborhood.

The district can be found along Halsted Street, between Van Buren and Madison Streets.

== History ==
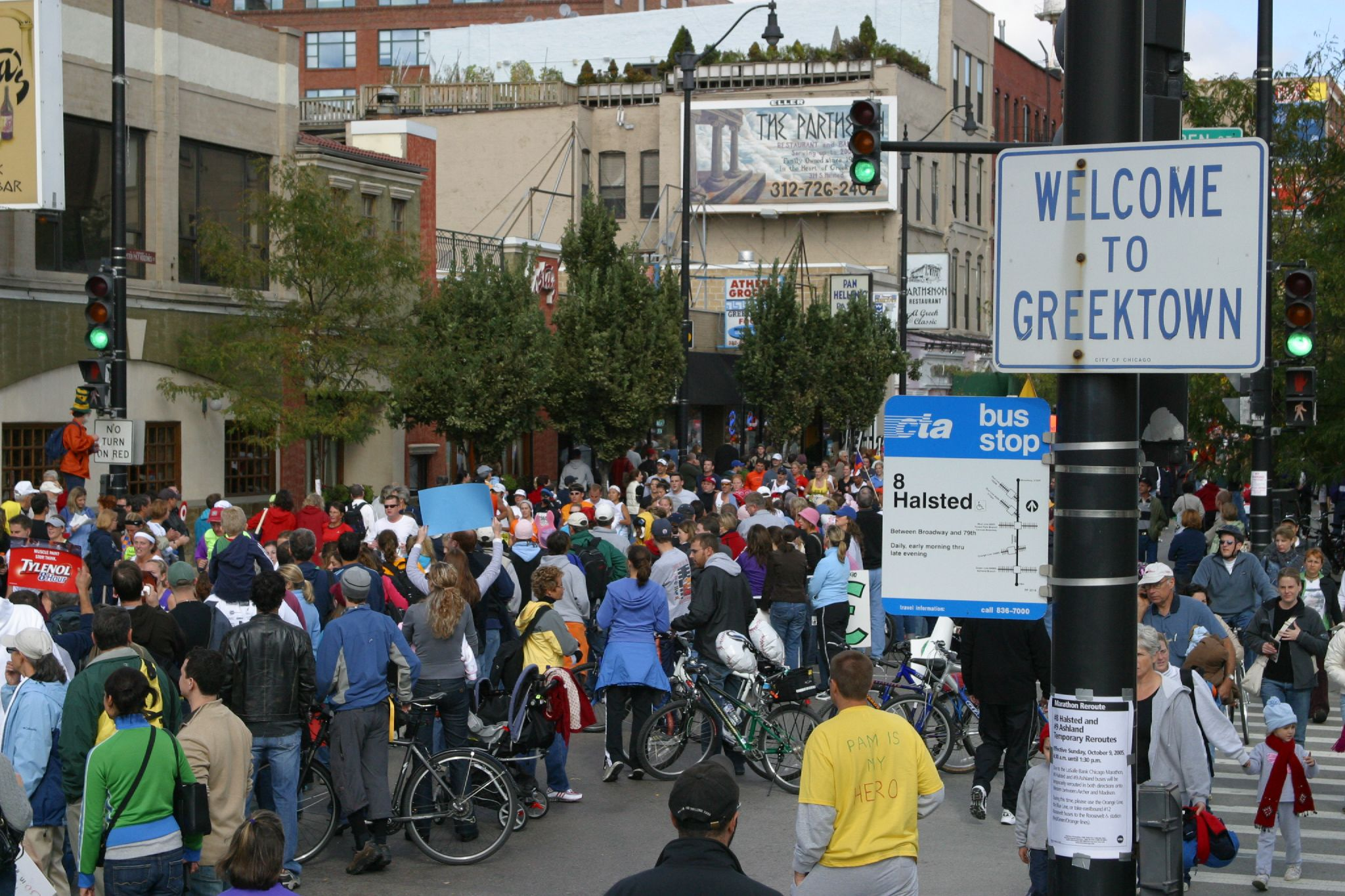
Restaurants at Greektown, Chicago

The first Greek immigrants to settle in Chicago arrived in the 1840s via the Mississippi and Illinois rivers. The major fires of Chicago in 1871 caused significant further quantities of Greek immigrants to move to the area, including the founder Christ Chakonas, later dubbed the "Columbus of Sparta," inspired by the prospect of rebuilding the town of Chicago. Almost a decade later, in 1882, a group of nearly one thousand Greek immigrants resided in Chicago's Near North Side area.

The original Greektown district on Halsted Street began with the Jane Addams Hull House, which acted as a meeting point for the Greek population within Chicago and provided a basis for community to be built from 1889. This house was used as a hub for the Greek community, and saw further small business expand within this area, despite small numbers, with 245 Greek people reported as living in Chicago, who were noted as predominantly young men of lower socioeconomic background. This saw a slow expansion of restaurants, and various other stores throughout the century, with the Chicago Tribune reporting in 1895 that "the Greeks have almost run the Italians out of the fruit business in Chicago not only on a small retail way, but as wholesalers as well."

The population was predominantly Greek Orthodox; in turn, the first Greek Orthodox Church in the midwest, Holy Trinity, was established in 1897. The church's location was centered around its parishioners, being in the heart of Greektown at the time. The church later established Socrates School in 1908, the first parochial school in the country.

Flaming Saganaki was invented at the Parthenon Restaurant in Chicago's Greektown.

Attempts to unite the various Greek restaurants in the area as well as the wider city were made with the establishment of "Hermes", a Greek business group in 1910. This group initially failed to gain traction amongst business owners. In the longer term, however, it unified the local Greek community, writing bylaws for its member businesses and organizing social events, laying the framework for current regulatory bodies such as the Greektown organization. Greece's geography divides many areas, so in response to the large population, a multitude of societies were created to unify those from different parts of Greece, including the Messenia Brotherhood (southern Greece) and Ephesian Society (Ionian islands).

By 1930, the area which had become known as the "Greek Delta", held a foreign and native-born population of over 30,000. Greektown had been nicknamed the "Greek Delta" because it was located North and west of the Hull House on Blue Island, Halsted, and Harrison Street, which created a triangle that resembles a Delta. After World War II, an influx of Greeks immigrated to the US under the Displaced Persons Act, and an even more enormous amount entered in 1965 when the National Origins Act was repealed. Many of them ended up residing in Chicago. This population continued its growth and expansion with the district growing in size and area.

This continued until 1960, when the opening of the University of Illinois Chicago campus, as well as the construction and opening of the Eisenhower Expressway, forced the neighborhood to move North along Halsted street to its current location along Halsted Street between Van Buren and Madison streets. The majority of functioning organizations and restaurants operating within the Greektown neighborhood opened within the 1970–1990 period following relocation to the current location along Halsted Street between Van Buren and Madison streets.

In 2016, the Parthenon closed after 48 years of being open, and neighboring restaurants, Santorini and Pegasus, closed within the year as well in order to make room for development. The closing of the 43 year old Pan Hellenic Pastry Shop in 2017 left few options for visitors. The onset of the COVID-19 pandemic in 2020 saw bars and restaurants within the precinct close for business and events either postponed or canceled.

== Events ==
There are various events occurring in the Greektown district, varying in scale from weekly to annually.

"A Taste of Greektown" is an annual culinary and cultural event held within the Greektown precinct, held in the month of August.

The stated aim of the festival is to combine "old world traditions with 21st century freshness" in the Greek cuisine, through the use of local neighborhood food producers and vendors. The event additionally offers entertainment through Greek bands and entertainment, as well as games for children. This event Is held between Adams Street and Van Buren street on 315 South Halsted street. This event saw the 30th anniversary of its founding occur in 2019.

The Greektown neighborhood organization also offer various events which occur on a more regular basis, such as monthly Greek dancing classes. Many events scheduled for early 2020, however, such as the scheduled 12th District Chicago Alternative Policing Strategy meeting for citizens to raise queries and concerns with local police, were either canceled or postponed due to COVID-19 restrictions.

== Cultural sites ==
The prominent cultural site within the Greektown precinct is the National Hellenic Museum, situated on 333 South Halsted street.

This museum was established initially in 1983, with its new facility on Halsted street officially opened in 2011. The museum states its purpose as depicting and upholding the legacy of Greek culture within the United States through education. In its depiction of the Greek experience and legacy within the United States, the museum utilises over 20,000 resources. These include texts, artifacts, photographs and newspapers, as well as over 400 recorded accounts. The museum receives regular visits organized through the "Office of Tourism's Chicago Neighborhoods" program, as well as over 10,000 public school students from Chicago every year.

The museum regularly updates and introduces exhibits, such as the "Reaching for the American Dream: The Greek Story in America" exhibit, gifted by Angela G. Paterakis; this exhibit traces the story of Hellenic culture and its integration into the US through involvement in major historical events, and establishing businesses and communities. The museum has also taken over exhibits from other museums, such as the Cyprus Museum of Jackson Florida's entire collection, which included artifacts numbering over 300.

== Urban renewal ==
The Greektown district began an urban renewal process on December 1, 2017, by conducting surveys, interviews and reviews amongst local businesses and community members. This was followed by more canvassing and local community consultancy, with a final Strategic plan published in March 2019.

The overarching purpose behind the publication of a strategic plan is to outline a clear path for continued economic sustenance for the Greektown district, while ensuring that the heritage and cultural significance for the Greek community is not diminished. It is a 123-page document, outlining intentions to enhance Greektown as a "compelling cultural destination and vibrant business district."

The report also states its intended methods to achieve these goals, including storefront and façade decoration enhancements, as well as prioritizing various action items in order to increase public engagement with the precinct, such as the introduction of a year long calendar, detailing planned events and promotions within the precinct. These activities have been designed while considering the propensity for property ownership and prices, as well as zoning to change in the future.

== Transportation ==
Greektown is easily accessible via public transportation by riding the Chicago "L"'s Blue Line to the UIC-Halsted station and head north from the station. Another train transportation option is taking the Metra's Union Pacific North, West, or Northwest lines to Ogilvie Transportation Center. One can also ride the Green Line or the Pink Line to the Morgan station. In addition, the neighborhood is accessible via the CTA #8 Halsted bus route.

== See also ==
- List of restaurant districts and streets in the United States
- Greeks in Chicago
