= ABC 18 =

ABC 18 may refer to one of the following television stations in the United States:

== Current ==
- KOHD in Bend, Oregon
- KWYB in Butte–Bozeman, Montana
- WDFL-LD in Miami–Fort Lauderdale, Florida
  - Simulcast of ABC Miami on WSVN-DT2
- WDHN in Dothan, Alabama
- WQOW in Eau Claire, Wisconsin
  - Semi-satellite of WXOW in Eau Claire, Wisconsin

== Former ==
- WCCB in Charlotte, North Carolina (1966–1978)
- WGTH-TV (now WUVN) in Hartford, Connecticut (1954–1955)
