= Marilyn Mitzel =

American journalist

Marilyn Mitzel is an American television reporter and news anchor, originally from North Dakota.

== Education ==
She studied Journalism at Arizona State University. She worked on her master's degree in journalism at Butler University in Indianapolis.

== Awards and honours ==
For her work on health & medical news and WSVN:

- Outstanding Achievement from the Associated Press.
- Special Recognition Awards from the American Heart Association.

Emmy Awards:

- A Matter of Life and Death, series.
- Hope Never Dies, series.

Other awards:

- The Consumer Awareness Media Award from Dade County Trial Lawyers Association.

Her series Cancer at the Pumps is cited as contributing to a change in Florida Law, requiring vapor recovery systems on all gas pumps.

== Broadcasters ==
- WJLA-TV in Washington D.C.
- WRTV in Indianapolis.
- WSVN in Miami.
- KFYR-TV in Bismarck, North Dakota.
