= Howard Finkelstein =

American lawyer

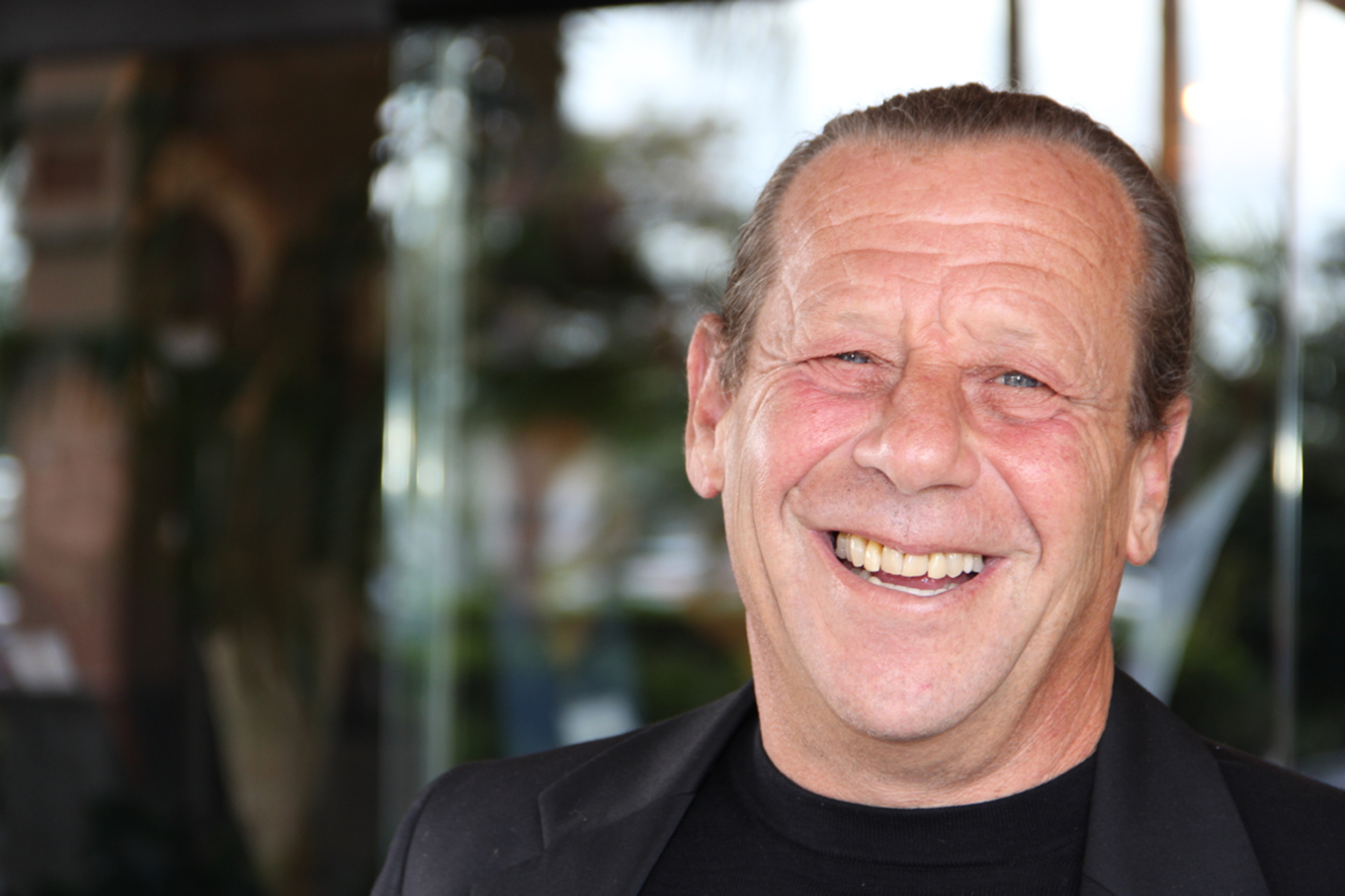
Howard Finkelstein

Howard Finkelstein is a retired American attorney who served as the public defender of Broward County, Florida. He was first elected in 2004 and re-elected in 2008, 2012, and 2016. He retired in January 2021.

== Early life and education ==
Howard received his Bachelor of Arts degree in the Social and Behavioral Sciences from the University of South Florida in 1975. He received his Juris Doctor degree from the University of Miami School of Law in 1978.

== Career ==
He practiced both as a government lawyer and in the private sector. While in private practice, he was a partner in the law firm of Brackey, Finkelstein and Dallas, and specialized in criminal defense. In 1987, Finkelstein's license to practice law was suspended after he pleaded no contest to drug possession and driving under the influence. Prosecutors also accused him of using his position as an attorney to obtain a court order that allowed him to retrieve drugs confiscated from a client.

As a public defender for most of his career, he represented clients charged with crimes ranging from misdemeanors to murder. As a Chief Assistant Public Defender, Finkelstein was instrumental in forming the first drug court in Florida and initiating a misdemeanor and felony mental health court in Broward County.

He also serves as the on-air legal analyst for WSVN Channel 7 News for over 20 years. In that capacity he has provided gavel to gavel legal commentary in the case of the State of California vs. O.J. Simpson and has provided ongoing commentary during the U.S. vs. Timothy McVeigh Oklahoma bombing trial, the President Clinton impeachment proceedings, the Princess Diana investigation, Bush vs Gore legal battle for the Presidency, the "nanny" murder trial, INS vs Elian Gonzalez, the Terry Schiavo right to die case and the Marv Albert and Michael Jackson trials. His televised commentaries during the O.J. Simpson trial made him a star on local Florida television. WSVN-TV still uses his "Help Me Howard" feature.

Howard was honored as "Man of the Year" by the Deerfield Beach Democratic Club in 2013.
