= Josh Moser =

American sportscaster

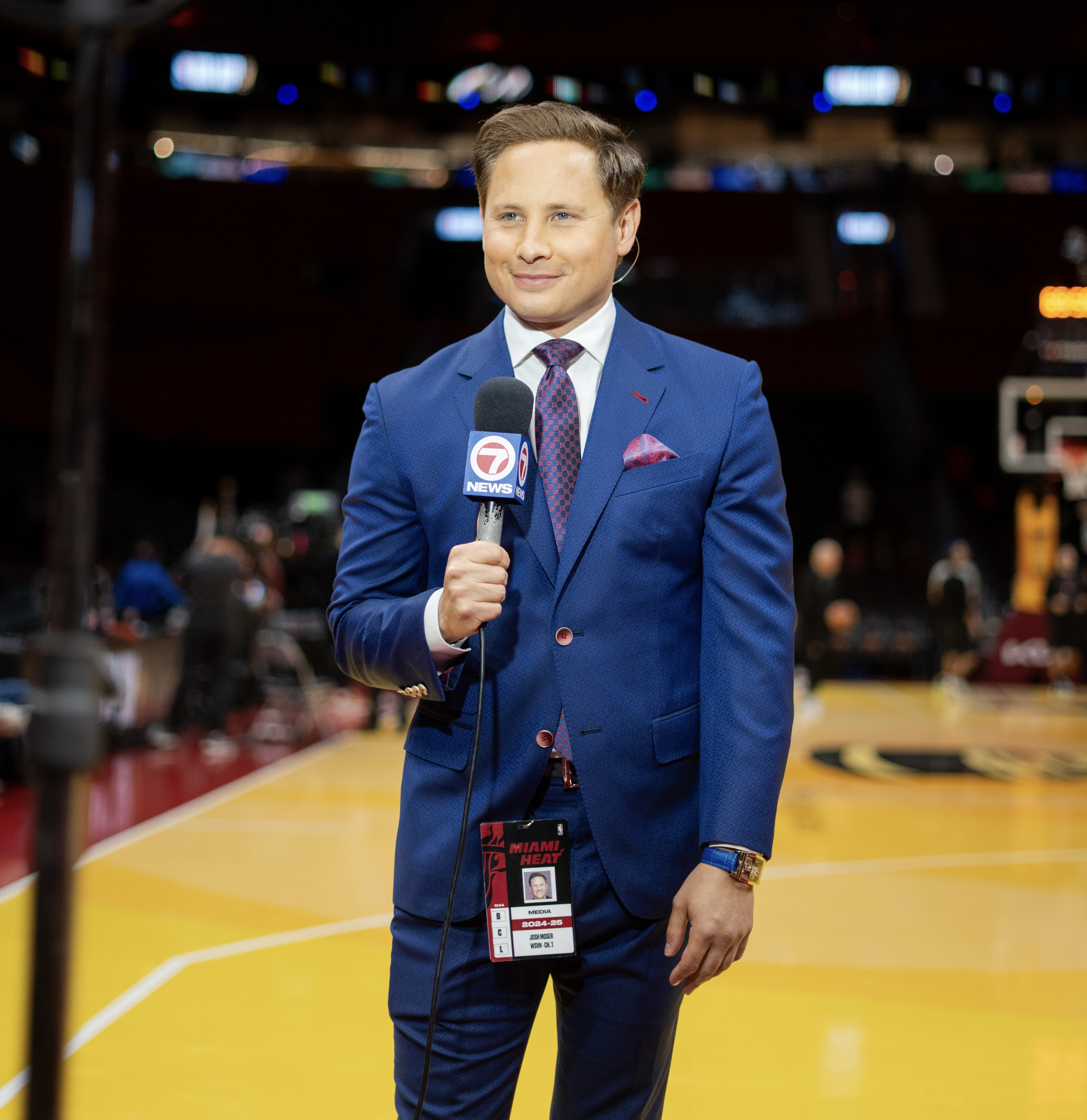
- Moser in 2024
- Education: University of Southern California (BA)
- Occupations: Sports Journalist; Sportscaster
- Years active: 2010–present
- Employer: WSVN (Channel 7)

Josh Moser is an American sportscaster and journalist currently serving as the main sports anchor at WSVN in Miami, Florida. Raised in Southern California, Moser graduated from the Annenberg School of Journalism at the University of Southern California (USC). He has had roles at several notable stations, including KREX in Grand Junction, Colorado; KUSA in Denver, Colorado; and WLUK-TV (Fox 11) in Green Bay, Wisconsin, before joining WSVN in Miami.

== Early life and education ==
Moser grew up in Southern California and attended Westlake High School (California) where he played both baseball and basketball. He then studied at the Annenberg School for Communication and Journalism at the University of Southern California. While at USC, Moser served as a reporter for USCTrojans.com, where he covered USC Trojans football under Pete Carroll. He also was a part of the Trojan Fever Basketball Blog, the first behind-the-scenes platform that integrated print, broadcast, and online media for Men's Division I basketball. He was a sports reporter and anchor for Annenberg TV News.

== Career ==
=== Work in Colorado ===
Moser began his journalism career as a sports anchor and reporter at KREX in Grand Junction, Colorado. He was later promoted to the position of Sports Director at the same station. In July 2014, Moser joined KUSA (TV) (channel 9) in Denver, Colorado as a sports reporter. During his time, he covered Peyton Manning, Demaryius Thomas, and the 2014 Denver Broncos season.

=== Tenure in Green Bay ===
Moser subsequently worked as Sports Director at WLUK-TV (Fox 11) in Green Bay, Wisconsin. In that role, he hosted the program "Inside the Huddle," a half-hour show focused on coverage of the Green Bay Packers that featured interviews with past and present team members. In August 2019, Moser hosted "Jordy Nelson’s Retirement -- Inside the Huddle Legends Series," featuring an interview with Nelson about his 11-year NFL career. He interviewed numerous Packers players and coaches including Donald Driver, Greg Jennings, Blake Martinez, and Mason Crosby. He covered the 2017 U.S. Open (golf) at Erin Hills. He covered Brett Favre's Pro Football Hall of Fame induction.

=== Miami and WSVN ===
In November 2020, Moser joined WSVN-TV in Miami, Florida. At WSVN, he serves as the main sports anchor on weeknight newscasts and as the host of "Lexus Sports Xtra," a Sunday night sports program that includes interviews and coverage of regional sports stories. Moser regularly interviews sports agent Drew Rosenhaus on the show. Moser covers a range of sports in the Miami area including the Miami Marlins, Miami Heat, and Miami Dolphins.

In 2023, Miami New Times named Moser as the Best TV Sports Anchor.

== Philanthropic work ==
He has participated in Movember. In 2018, Moser was honored as a Future 15 recipient at a Green Bay gala, recognizing young professionals for community impact and achievements. In 2019, he emceed an event with football coach Rob Mendez, who was born without arms and legs, and coach Matt LaFleur. In November 2024, Moser emceed the unveiling of new artwork for the United Way of Broward. Moser participated in a cycling fundraising event called Dolphins Challenge Cancer XIV.
