= Jim Berry (news anchor) =

American journalist

James L. Berry (born c. 1955), known professionally as Jim Berry, is a news anchor for the CBS affiliate in Miami, Florida, and was a longtime sports anchor and reporter for various television stations. He has won five Emmy awards for his news and sports reporting.

== Early life and education ==
A native of Chicago who grew up in the city's Hyde Park neighborhood, Berry earned a bachelor's degree in 1977 from Northwestern University's Medill School of Journalism. He is a member of the Alpha Phi Alpha fraternity.

== Professional career ==
Berry began his career at WBTV-TV in Charlotte, North Carolina, where he started as a reporter trainee and progressed to being a weekend anchor. Berry then joined WJLA-TV in Washington, D.C. as a weekend anchor before switching to the sports desk.

Berry then joined WSVN-TV in Miami as a sports director, where he worked for six years. In April 1994, Berry joined WBBM-TV in Chicago as a sports anchor.

In August 1996, Berry joined WFOR-TV in Miami as the station's sports director. In June 2008, Berry shifted to being a morning news anchor at WFOR.

== Personal ==
Berry and his wife, Cheryl Annette Mattox Berry, have two children. They live in Palmetto Bay, Florida.
