= WSVN =

Television station in Miami

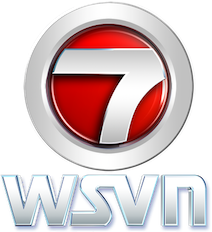

- Miami–Fort Lauderdale, Florida; United States
- City: Miami, Florida
- Channels: Digital: 9 (VHF); Virtual: 7
- Branding: WSVN 7, ABC Miami; 7 News

Programming
- Affiliations: 7.1: Fox; 7.2/18.1: ABC; for others, see § Subchannels

Ownership
- Owner: Sunbeam Television Corporation

History
- First air date: July 29, 1956 (Note: First air date under the current license was December 19, 1962.)
- Former call signs: WCKT (1956–1983)
- Former channel numbers: Analog: 7 (VHF, 1956–2009); Digital: 8 (VHF, 2000–2009), 7 (VHF, 2009–2019)
- Former affiliations: NBC (1956–1989)
- Call sign meaning: Channel "Seven"

Technical information
- Licensing authority: FCC
- Facility ID: 63840
- ERP: 158 kW
- HAAT: 307.1 m (1,008 ft)
- Transmitter coordinates: 25°58′1″N 80°12′42″W
- Translator(s): WDFL-LD 18 Miami (relays 7.2)

Links
- Public license information: Public file; LMS
- Website: wsvn.com; wsvn.com/abc-miami-18/

WSVN (channel 7) is a television station in Miami, Florida, United States, affiliated with Fox and ABC. It is the flagship station of locally based Sunbeam Television and has studios on the 79th Street Causeway in North Bay Village and a transmitter in Miami Gardens, Florida.

The Federal Communications Commission (FCC) regards WSVN as having signed on for the first time on December 19, 1962, as WCKT under Sunbeam ownership. However, the station was the result of a long and contentious legal battle between Sunbeam and three other applicants for the channel 7 allocation in Miami. Biscayne Television Corporation, a three-way partnership including the publishers of the Miami News and Miami Herald signed on a previous WCKT on July 29, 1956, only to be stripped of its license due to ethics violations within the FCC and unethical behavior by its principals during the application process. Sunbeam purchased WCKT's assets and relaunched the station under a new license with uninterrupted service, while claiming the old WCKT's history as its own. The market's NBC affiliate since its inception, WCKT was renamed WSVN in 1983 and became an independent with Fox programming on January 1, 1989, after NBC's purchase of CBS affiliate WTVJ and CBS's purchase of Fox affiliate WCIX-TV initiated a major affiliation switch. With minimal advance preparation, WSVN relaunched their news department with an emphasis on tabloid journalism under Joel Cheatwood's direction, an unconventional decision initially pilloried by the local media but which has since been emulated and copied throughout the industry.

WSVN's newscasts have attracted national and international attention for aggressive and controversial content and have been credited as an inspiration for the launch of Fox News. One of the largest Fox affiliates not owned by the network, it was famously called "the future of television" by onetime Fox executive Lucie Salhany. Involved with Sunbeam from the company's beginnings until his death on July 26, 2020, chairman Edmund Ansin repeatedly refused offers to sell either WSVN or his Boston stations. On August 4, 2025, a subchannel of WSVN replaced WPLG as Miami's ABC affiliate.

== The first WCKT (1956–1962) ==
=== Competing license applicants ===
Due to the Federal Communications Commission (FCC) imposing a freeze on additional television licenses on September 30, 1948, the Miami market had only one television station in operation during that period: WTVJ, which signed on the air on March 21, 1949. In preparation for the freeze being lifted, WIOD radio and the Miami Daily News—jointly controlled by publisher James M. Cox—filed an application with the FCC for a new station on very high frequency (VHF) channel 7 on May 26, 1952. WIOD and the News proposed in the application to build a studio valued at $1.25 million (equivalent to $15.2 million in 2025) at WIOD's transmission towers on the 79th Street Causeway. The WIOD-News application was met with a competing application filed several weeks later by WQAM owner Miami Broadcasting Company, controlled by Miami Herald publisher John S. Knight. Faced with the possibility of protracted competitive hearings before the FCC lasting two to three years, Cox and Knight withdrew their bids and filed a joint application as Biscayne Television Corporation, operating autonomously from either newspaper and with former NBC president Niles Trammell as its president. Trammell, who joined NBC in 1929 and parent RCA in 1923, was credited for developing much of the network's talent and organized Biscayne after convincing Cox and Knight to collaborate rather than compete. Biscayne would purchase WIOD from Cox, while Knight would divest WQAM to meet regulatory approval; Cox and Knight would each hold 42.5 percent of company stock, with Trammell holding the remaining 15 percent.

Biscayne Television Corporation main partners

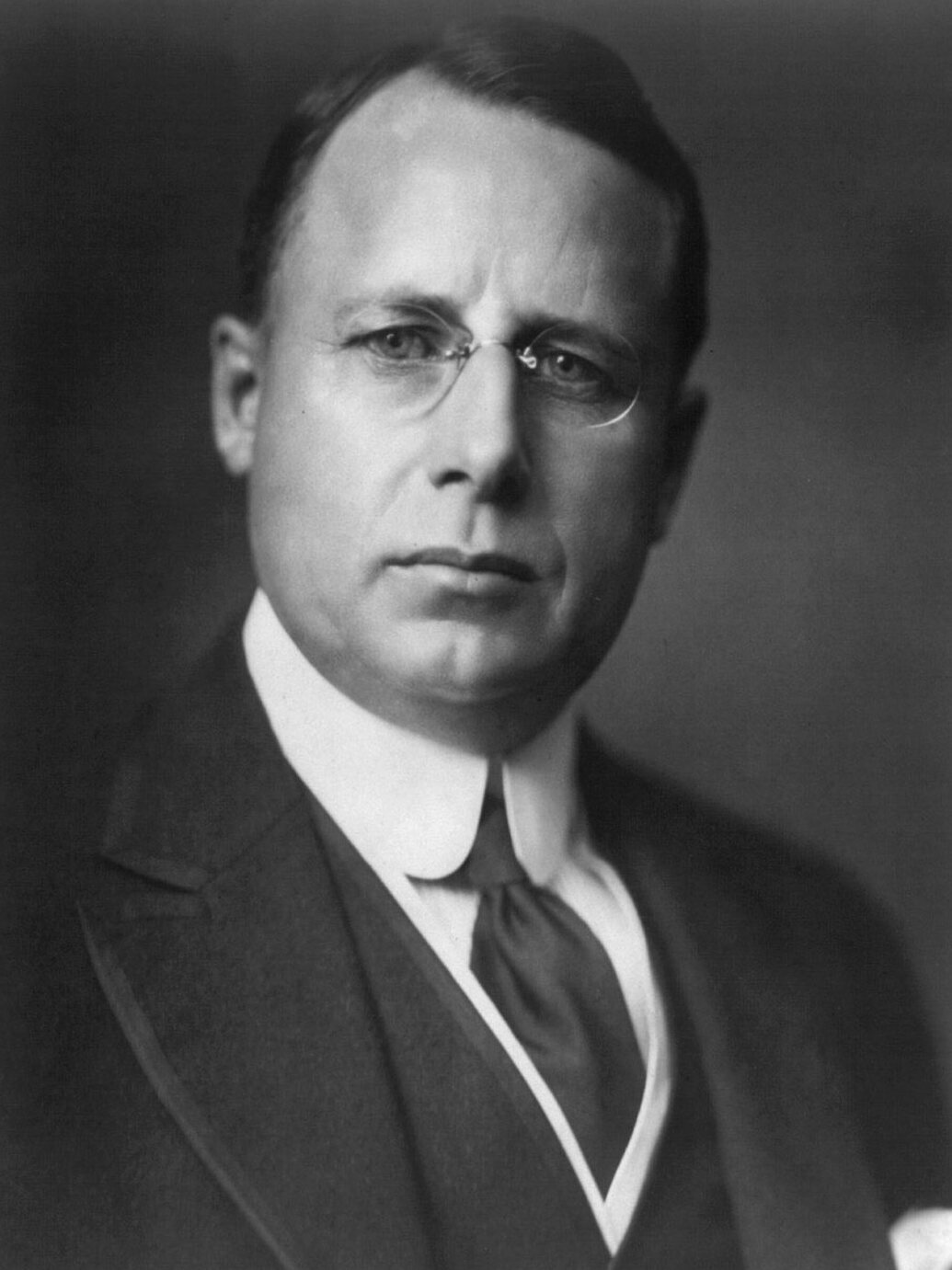
James M. Cox

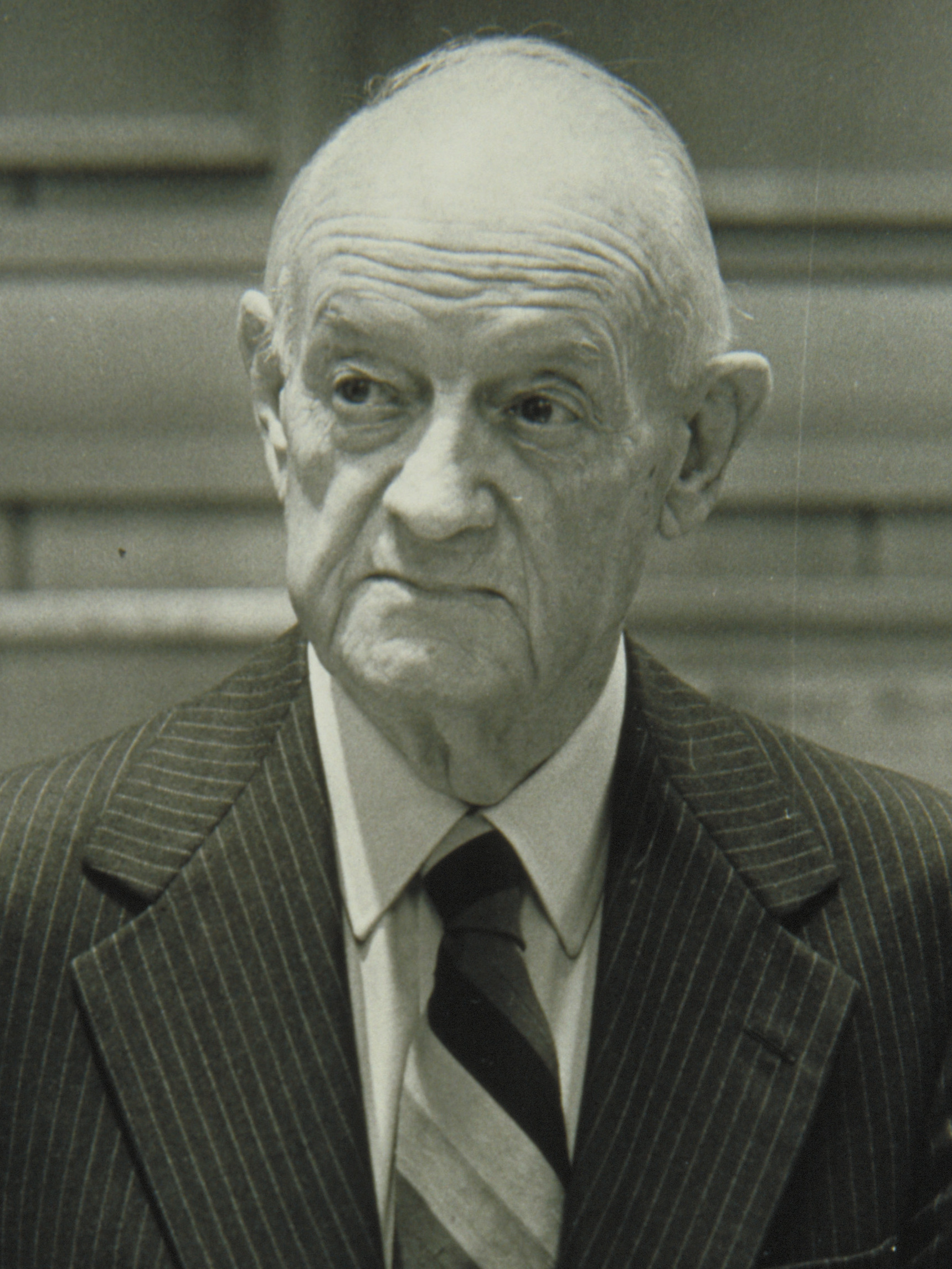
John S. Knight

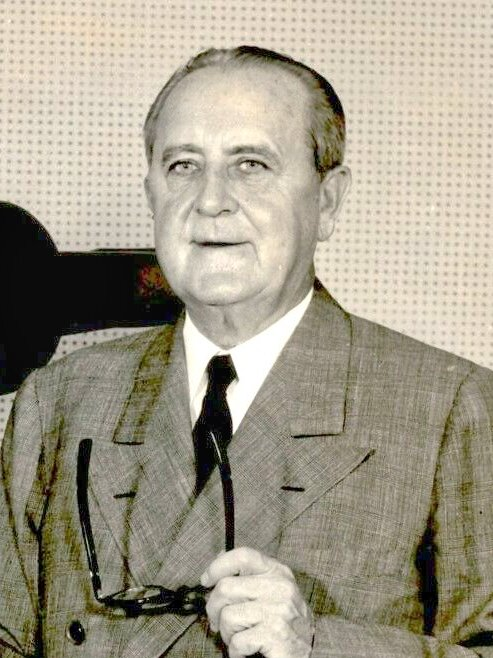
Niles Trammell

Despite this new joint venture, the application found itself as one of 12 competing applications for four channel allotments in the market: VHF channels 7 and 10 and ultra high frequency (UHF) channels 27 and 33. In particular, Biscayne Television faced three competing applications for channel 7, including one from two Davenport, Iowa, residents; Florida Sen. George Smathers warned of a possibility that Miami might not have another television station sign on before 1958 due to the number of competing applications. The number of applicants for a channel 7 license increased to five on December 16, 1953, after real estate developer Sidney Ansin filed one under the Sunbeam Television Corp. name. Ansin included a proposal for studios located in Miami's Allapattah neighborhood and encompassing his existing six-block Park-and-Shop City development dubbed "Television City", with sons Ronald and Edmund Ansin assisting. Originally a shoe maker from Massachusetts, Sidney relocated to Miami Beach, Florida, in 1941 and later sold land to Mitchell Wolfson for WTVJ's transmission tower after the Federal Aviation Administration (FAA) rezoned it for broadcasting; this became the source for his interest in the medium. Sidney filed an application after consulting a friend in Washington, D.C., and included Ronald and Edmund—both Harvard University students—when they expressed interest.

After the Davenport-based group withdrew their bid, hearings were scheduled to begin on February 19, 1954, for the four remaining applicants—Biscayne, Sunbeam, East Coast Television Corporation, and South Florida Television Corporation—supervised by FCC examiner James D. Cunningham. All four applicants agreed to a timetable of informal conferences with Cunningham so as to reduce the amount of needed testimony to one-tenth of what normal applications called for. Biscayne was the first to complete their case in mid-May, with Cox and Knight extolling the accomplishments of both the News and Herald; Cox cited the News's coverage of Al Capone's 1929 move to Miami, while Knight referenced multiple awards given to the Herald for public service, with both newspapers being Pulitzer Prize recipients. East Coast was primarily represented by Lee Phillips, a former WTVJ employee, while South Florida Television president Jack C. Stein testified that his corporation consisted of Miami-based shareholders and was best able to represent the interests of Miamians. The last to present, Sidney Ansin stated on Sunbeam's behalf that he believed television "presented a wonderful future" and was described as the organization's "moving spirit". All four applicants completed their case summaries by mid-August. Cunningham delivered his recommendation for Biscayne Television on January 18, 1955; in response, Trammell announced the new station's planned affiliation with NBC while also saying, "while it would be improper to anticipate when the commission will confirm Mr. Cunningham's report, Biscayne hopes to be in operation as shortly thereafter as possible."

=== Awarding the license ===
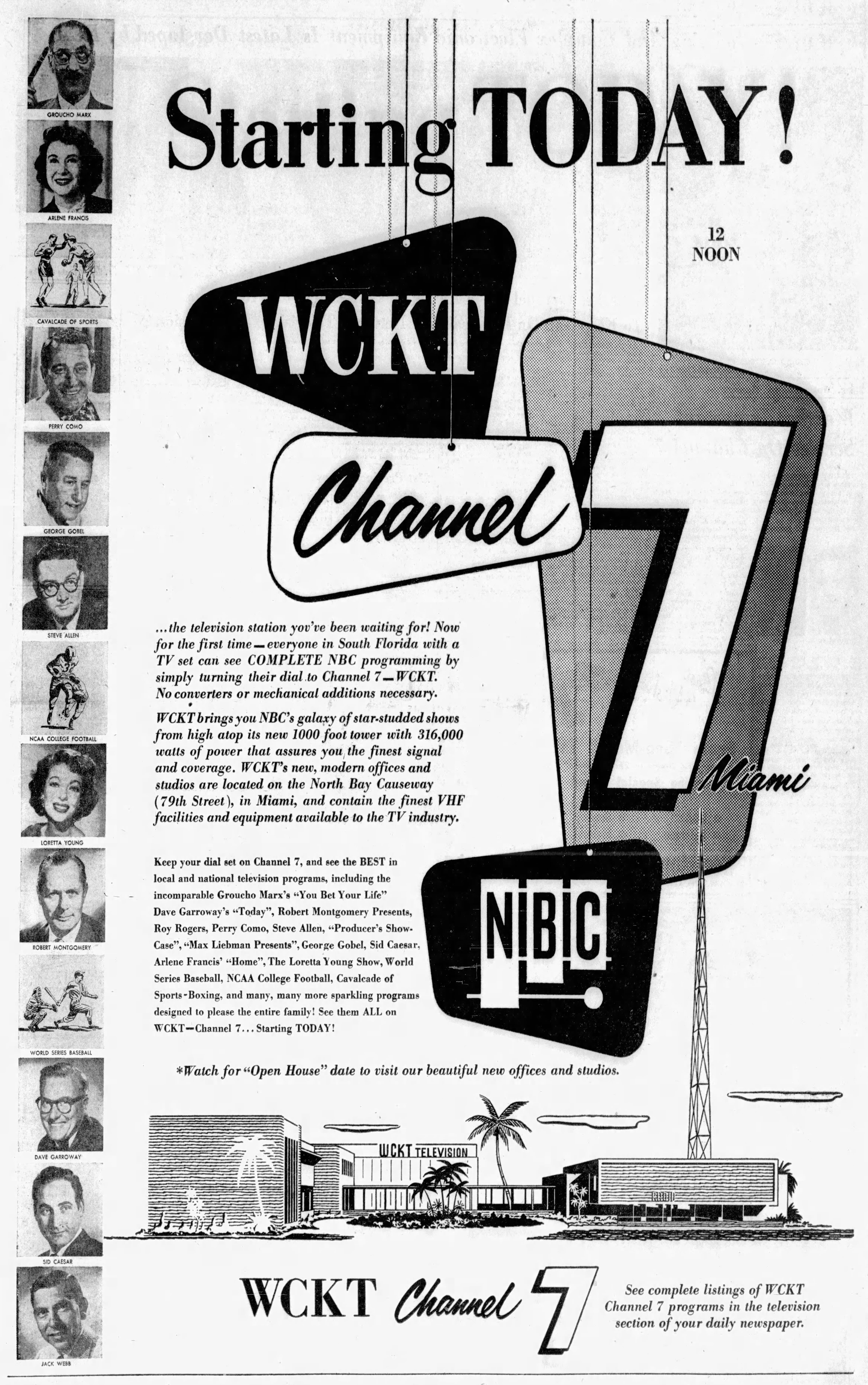
WCKT's first day of operations took place on July 29, 1956.

The FCC's broadcast bureau challenged Cunningham's recommendation of Biscayne due to Cox and Knight's ownership of the city's two daily newspapers, stating it undermined the commission's policy of encouraging diversity in mass media ownership and risked creating a competitive imbalance in the Miami market. The Dade County Central Labor Union (CLU), the American Federation of Labor (AFL), and American Civil Liberties Union (ACLU) all filed protests with the FCC, with the CLU's protest citing both newspapers holding anti-labor policies, but these were dismissed. The FCC formally awarded the license to Biscayne on January 20, 1956, by a 5–2 vote among the commissioners. Losing applicants East Coast Television, South Florida Television, and Sunbeam filed appeals with the United States Court of Appeals in Washington and were joined by a separate joint appeal filed by Storer Broadcasting, owner of Fort Lauderdale–licensed WGBS-TV (channel 23), and Gerico Investment, owners of ABC affiliate WITV (channel 17). The Storer-Gerico appeal was filed to prevent WCKT's sign-on until the FCC agreed to a policy of allowing only VHF or UHF stations to be built in a given market but was dismissed. Biscayne revealed the WCKT call sign for their channel 7 license on March 10, 1956, standing for the Cox-Knight-Trammell partnership.

Confirming Trammell's intentions one year earlier, WCKT would sign on as the market's NBC affiliate, while WIOD was purchased by Biscayne, renamed WCKR and joined the NBC Radio Network. This resulted in the network terminating its existing affiliation with WGBS-TV, which was forced to convert into an independent. Groundbreaking for the new combined radio-television studios at the WCKR transmitter site took place on March 20, 1956; Trammell promised the facility would be completed by June. To prevent interference from WCKR's towers, $25,000 worth of copper sheeting (equivalent to $2,960,526 in 2025) was installed around the entire building, encasing it to create "a shield within a shield". The building was still partially unfinished when WCKT took to the air on July 29, 1956, with an open house to the general public set to take place by the fall. Promotion manager Bob Nashick had an idea for an extravagant opening ceremony including water-skiers and skydivers, saying, "I want to see the biggest traffic jam in history on the Causeway"; this was rejected by management. Writing for the Herald, Jack Anderson described the facility as "impressive" but noted the absence of a parking lot, saying, "it would help to have some Swiss mountain climbing experience to get into the building." Dedication of the building took place on November 10, 1956, with multiple dignitaries and politicians in attendance including Florida governor LeRoy Collins, Sen. George Smathers, FCC chairman George McConnaughey, and commissioner John C. Doerfer; WCKT and WCKR broadcast the dedication live.

=== Signing on under Biscayne ===
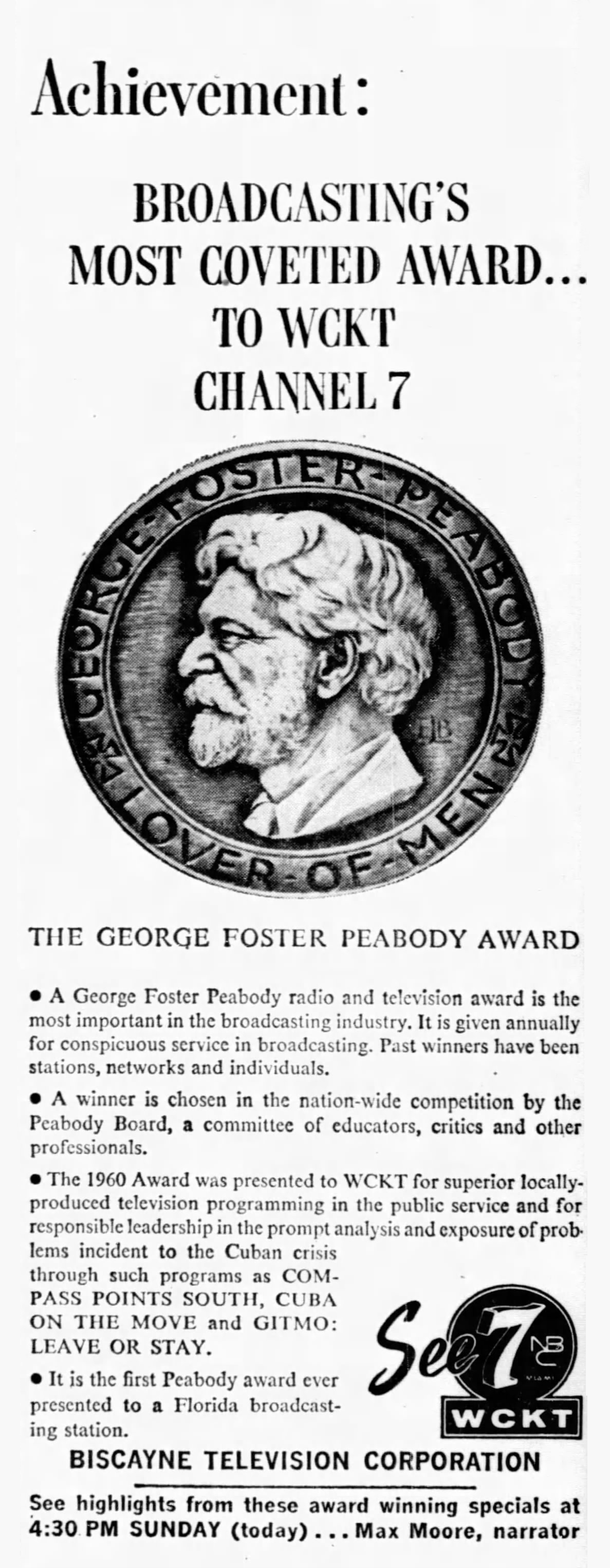
Advertisement promoting WCKT's 1960 Peabody Award, the station's first.

At launch, WCKT's newscasts were handled by Gordon Shaw in mornings, news director Charles Harrison in early evenings, and Phil Kelleher in late evenings. The station also boasted "a completely equipped" newsroom located adjacent to the main studio. WCKT's debut program was a news bulletin anchored by Shaw. Jack Anderson later wrote in his Herald column that Shaw continued to smile throughout the bulletin, which included a story on a train derailment. The news team had radio backgrounds: Harrison was a distinguished reporter at Philadelphia's WFIL, Shaw and Kelleher were WQAM veterans, and assistant news director Gene Strul was previously WIOD's news director. Under Harrison's guidance, WCKT produced its first long-form documentary—Whispered Menace, about sex psychology and molesters—that premiered on August 7, 1957. This documentary helped WCKT win its first national award by the Radio-Television News Directors Association for outstanding televised news story, citing the station "having courage to use a news story on sexual psychopaths"; Whispered Menace was also screened at area schools and PTA meetings. After Harrison left WCKT in October 1957, veteran CBS News correspondent Bill Shadel was hired as his replacement. Within the station's first year, WCKT succeeded in achieving ratings parity against WTVJ and WPST-TV: WPST's launch was expedited when WGBS-TV shut down on April 13, 1957, and Storer sold off the station's assets to WPST owner National Airlines after they won the Miami channel 10 permit.

Bill Shadel left the station by May 1958 to join ABC News after that network reportedly "made him an offer he couldn't resist". WCKT hired Wayne Fariss from WTVT in Tampa, Florida, where he had been that station's first newscaster, to be lead anchorman starting on June 30, 1958. Fariss competed against top-rated Ralph Renick at WTVJ, who in the August 1959 Arbitron ratings held a 23.8 share (Note: According to Nielsen Media Research, a share is a percentage of the total number of households with a television set in use that are tuned to a television network, station or program at a given time. A rating is a percentage of the total population tuned into a specific television network, station or program.) at 6:30 p.m.; this prompted WCKT to move Fariss's early-evening newscast to 6 p.m., in between the station's late-afternoon movie hosted by Bob Clayton. Fariss and reporter Ben Silver were selected by Gov. Collins to be a part of a fact-finding tour of the Soviet Union in June 1959, with Fariss providing reports to the station via radio and telephone. The station won the Peabody Award on April 19, 1961, for its coverage of the Cuban Revolution and its local ramifications including several long-form documentaries, which was the first time a Florida radio or television station won the award. Silver's reporting of the Battle of Santa Clara in particular, alongside NBC newsman Herb Kaplow and Ed Scott, was so well received by the 26th of July Movement that they regarded Silver as one of their own. Fariss's newscasts were additionally translated into Spanish and simulcast over local radio beginning in 1962, with his scripts interpreted in real time. While Fariss was originally said to deliver newscasts via notes instead of a prepared script, he eventually allowed producer David Choate to assist with any advance preparation and copy editing; Fariss was regarded as Renick's chief competition by the end of 1962.

Despite signing on, the legal battle over the WCKT license continued for nearly a full year. The Washington Court of Appeals temporarily set aside the grant of channel 7 to Biscayne on March 14, 1957, citing the FCC's failure to question any possible adverse effect from Trammell's past ties with NBC that could benefit the network. Trammell was considered by the court to be "the key figure" and "vital 'middle man'" in Biscayne's operations. The court's ruling did not suspend or affect WCKT's license, with the FCC rejecting any proposal filed to order the station to go dark. Biscayne's license grant was reaffirmed by the FCC on June 21, 1957, by a 4–2 vote. The FCC gave Biscayne a demerit for "possible conflict of interest" with regards to Trammell but still considered the company to be the "best qualified applicant" for the license. The license application file was closed by the commission that December.

=== FCC ethics violations and ramifications ===
"[John S.] Knight told me he knew the license had been awarded to Biscayne Television before it was announced by the FCC," said [Stephen J.] Angland. The attorney said he asked [Niles] Trammell if he had talked to any of the commissioners while the case was pending. He said Trammell replied: "I guess I made the rounds. I don't guess I missed anybody."

— Paul Einstein, The Miami News

The House Subcommittee on Legislative Oversight was organized in July 1957 to investigate the practices of federal regulatory agencies. FCC chairman John C. Doerfer disclosed during a cross-examination on February 5, 1958, that a 1956 golf trip taken by Civil Aeronautics Board chairman James R. Durfee was paid in full by an undisclosed airline. Doerfer's testimony came as four of the seven commissioners were accused of misconduct and favoritism. Bernard Schwartz, recently fired as subcommittee counsel after alleging the committee was "trying to whitewash" behavior by Eisenhower administration officials, told reporters an unnamed commissioner (later identified as Richard Mack) engaged in bribery regarding an unspecified license application dispute.

Schwartz testified under oath that Mack was paid several thousand dollars by Thurman A. Whiteside, a lawyer National Airlines retained as a "fixer", according to Schwartz. Newspaper columnist Drew Pearson reported Whiteside's payment, made before Mack became a commissioner, enabled him to rule in favor of the airline for the channel 10 license. This overruled a prior recommendation given by an independent examiner to the FCC that said the channel 10 license should be granted to WKAT owner A. Frank Katzentine. Mack previously endorsed Katzentine for the channel 10 license in letters written to the FCC in 1951, while a Florida state employee. Whiteside testified several days later that Mack was a part-owner of Stembler-Shelden Insurance, which handled the insurance for both WPST-TV and Biscayne Television. Trammell called the Mack connection "a complete surprise", claimed Whiteside had been opposed to Biscayne's channel 7 license bid, and said Biscayne was insured by Stembler-Shelden due to Florida law requiring the company to have a locally-based insurer. The Federal Bureau of Investigation (FBI) was also called in by the subcommittee to help with the investigation.

Subcommittee attorney Stephen J. Angland's testimony on June 2, 1958, revealed that Knight and Trammell met with two Florida Power & Light officials—chairman McGregor Smith and vice-president Ben Fuqua—who in turn approached Mack on Biscayne's behalf. Fuqua, who was a personal friend of Mack, engaged in 29 telephone conversations with him over a two-year span. Mack then contacted Herald associate editor John D. Pennekamp inquiring about the character of Biscayne's officials, which Pennekamp saw as "disjointed" on Mack's end and a potential tip off of the commission's actions. John S. Knight also approached President Dwight D. Eisenhower, Ohio senator John W. Bricker, and previous FCC chairman George McConnaughey about applying political pressure to help Biscayne's application; McConnaughey, Doerfer, and Mack all voted in favor of Biscayne and to reaffirm the license. Angland's investigation found three of the four final applicants for the channel 7 license, including Biscayne, went outside of normal procedures, with Sunbeam being the only one that went through proper protocol. Subcommittee counsel Robert W. Lishman believed that internal pressure by applicants to the commission was present in nine contested TV licenses across the country.

=== Hearings and revocation ===
If I had been allied with the [Miami] Herald and had not disclosed this to the FCC we would have been subject to loss of our licenses... I thought there were very serious implications to the untrue rumor, and I felt that as a member of the FCC, [Richard] Mack should know the facts.

— James M. Cox

The FCC decided to reopen the process for the channel 7 license on April 3, 1959, with hearings in Philadelphia on conflict of interests among the commissioners. These hearings were conducted after Mack had resigned under pressure from President Eisenhower and was indicted with Whiteside on charges of influence peddling, fraud and conspiracy regarding the WPST-TV license. The first trial resulted in a hung jury; while Mack was too ill to be retried, Whiteside was acquitted but committed suicide. Former Pennsylvania Supreme Court justice Horace Stern presided as FCC examiner and scheduled hearings to begin on June 13, 1960. Stern was appointed to examine potential misconduct by the FCC surrounding all disputed or contested licenses, and said the investigation was "... a matter of public justice". Two weeks before the hearings started, Angland suffered a fatal heart attack, but his extant findings and prior testimony were admitted as evidence. Under oath, Trammell admitted to speaking multiple times with FCC commissioners but denied exerting undue influence and stated that the talks were to inform the agency of his resignation from NBC. Cox testified to speaking on the phone with Mack in December 1955, regarding rumors of a sub rosa arrangement between the News and Herald that Cox feared threatened not only the Biscayne bid but the licenses of his other broadcast assets.

After the hearings concluded, FCC general counsel proposed revoking WCKT's license and disqualifying Biscayne, South Florida Television and East Coast Television from participating in any subsequent license applications. All three companies denied any wrongdoing, while Sunbeam requested a specific finding declaring they were "completely innocent" and the other applicants disqualified themselves. Stern issued his ruling on September 14, 1960, agreeing with the general counsel's proposals and affirming them in his recommendations, with Sunbeam the recipient of a new license by default. Sidney Ansin was "delighted" at the ruling but unsure if it meant Sunbeam would be awarded a new license outright with no bidding process. The FCC revoked WPST-TV's license on July 14, 1960, and awarded a replacement license to WCKY owner L.B. Wilson, Inc., the only bidder for the channel 10 license not disqualified, but FCC chairman Frederick W. Ford said that the new license was short-term and meant to ensure uninterrupted broadcasting if another bidding process took place. Following a year-long review, WCKT's license was officially revoked by the FCC on July 26, 1961, but the ruling was held in abeyance to allow Biscayne an opportunity to appeal. Biscayne's petition for reconsideration was rejected by the FCC, which reaffirmed the ruling on May 10, 1962, via a 5–1 vote. Robert E. Lee, by that point the only remaining commissioner to vote in favor of the Biscayne license in 1956 and 1957, was the lone dissenter. The FCC's reaffirming stipulated that WCKT's license would remain active for four months but did not provide a definitive date for the Biscayne-Sunbeam changeover.

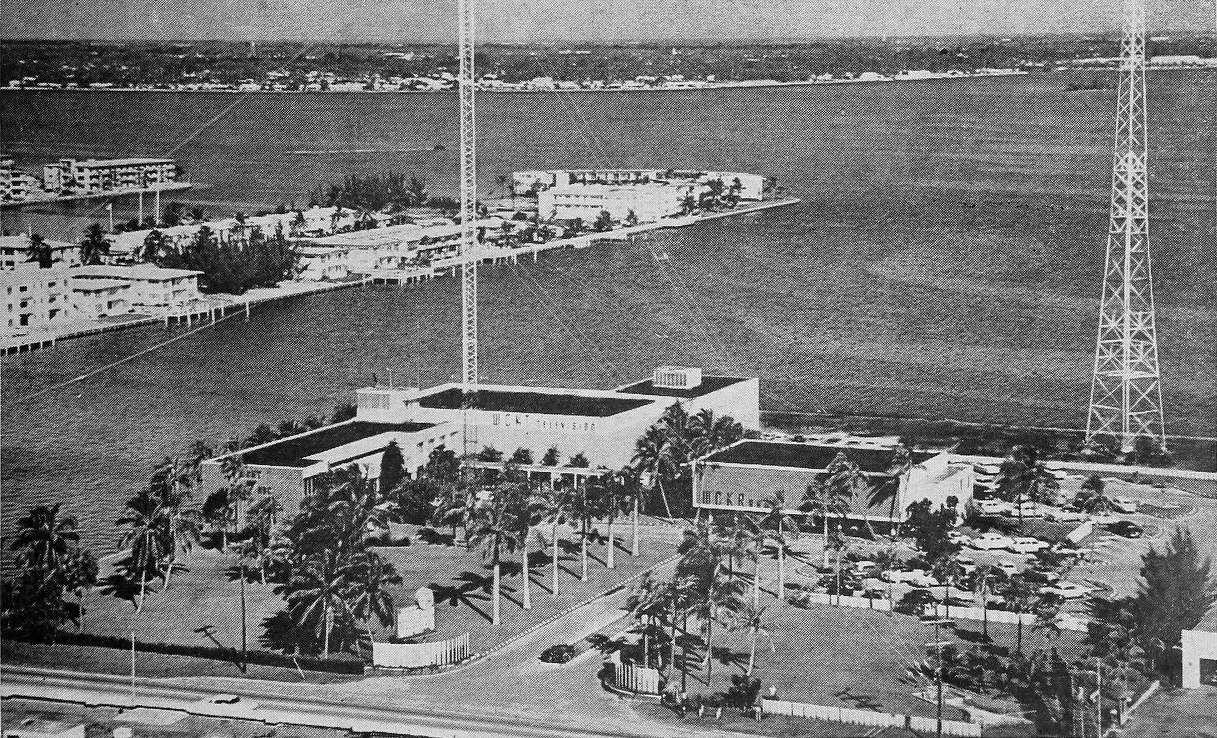
The "Isle of Dreams" in North Bay Village, home to channel 7's studios and WIOD's studios and transmitter towers

Biscayne president Niles Trammell filed an appeal with the U.S. Court of Appeals in Washington, citing the station's Peabody Award and industrial acclaim. However, the May 21, 1962, issue of Broadcasting reported Biscayne proposed donating WCKT's license and assets to the University of Miami, which would be leased back to Sunbeam; Sunbeam regarded the FCC ruling as a new license outright. Sidney Ansin confirmed that the proposal was suggested two months earlier but was rejected amid plans to construct a separate transmitter tower and studios. Despite the court appeal still being on file, Trammell announced on November 14, 1962, that Biscayne agreed to sell off WCKT's non-license assets to Sunbeam, while WCKR was sold back to the Cox family. As part of the agreement, James M. Cox Jr. and John S. Knight pledged their share of the proceeds to the University of Miami, with an initial $400,000 down payment and an additional $1.4 million over several years; university president Henry King Stanford announced the funds would help bolster its scientific education and research programs. The $3.4 million sale was approved on December 5, 1962, with Biscayne dropping all remaining challenges and appeals. Ansin retained all on- and off-air personnel, including existing station manager Charles Kelly, and re-used the WCKT call sign for the new license. Ownership of the island was partitioned between WCKT and WCKR, with shared parking, a security guard booth and an agreement not to build anything else on the island without the other owner's consent.

== The second WCKT (1962–1983) ==
=== Operating under the Ansin family ===
I gave some consideration about going to Wall Street but really wanted to be in business with my father.

— Edmund Ansin

Upon the change in ownership on December 19, 1962, Edmund Ansin—who was Sunbeam's treasurer—was installed as the station's executive vice president, while Sidney was named WCKT board chairman. Having graduated from the Wharton Business School in 1957, Edmund began working with his father Sidney's real estate holdings in South Florida as the region continued to enjoy substantial post-war growth. Edmund's addition was the only substantial change made with the license changeover, which was otherwise conducted in such a manner that the new WCKT subsequently claimed the prior WCKT's history as its own. Edmund's want to work with his father was his lead reason for joining Sunbeam after briefly considering working on Wall Street. Edmund was the executive vice president for a life insurance company Sidney co-founded in 1966 which bore the Sunbeam name; this company was sold off in 1969. Edmund headed the most significant expansion for Sunbeam's real estate operations: a $1 million purchase (equivalent to $9.26 million in 2025) of 637 acres (258 ha) of land in northeast Marion County, Indiana, on August 21, 1968, at the time the largest land sale in the county's history. The purchased land was developed into Indianapolis's Castleton neighborhood, helping make Sunbeam one of the largest land developers in Indiana.

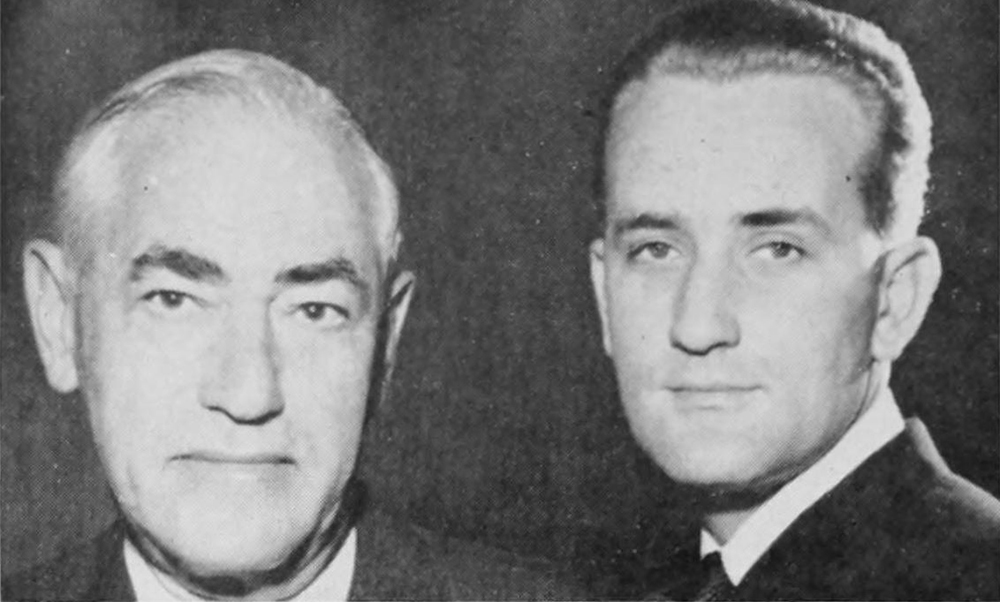
Sidney and Edmund Ansin

Due to the license being a short-term permit similar to the one awarded for WPST-TV replacement WLBW-TV, Sunbeam faced another bidding process for a full-time license. Sunbeam's only opposition came from Community Broadcasting Corp., composed of advertising executive Tally Embry and other Miami-based interests. FCC examiner Thomas Donahue ruled in favor of Sunbeam, saying that even though much of the station's programming output was done so "knowing ... that continued operation of the station was at stake", Sunbeam demonstrated that they knew how to operate WCKT. The FCC's broadcast bureau disagreed with Donahue's findings and with how Sunbeam was given credit for operating the station under pressure of the interim authority. An FCC attorney considered the bidding process to be "very close" but Sunbeam still held an edge. The FCC awarded Sunbeam a full-time license on May 15, 1965, by a unanimous 5–0 vote, concluding that they possessed all the necessary qualifications. Community Broadcasting Corp. filed an appeal with the U.S. Court of Appeals in Washington, arguing that the FCC's inclusion of Sunbeam's ongoing record maintaining the interim operation was unfair to their bid. The court ruled in favor of Sunbeam and the FCC in June 1966, with judge Carl E. McGowan noting:

Where a qualified applicant for a licensee has been compelled, by the moral shortcomings of his original competitors and of public servants themselves, to spend 10 years in the quest... it is perhaps not arbitrary to suggest that, as against the new applicants who have been spared that frustrating and expensive experience, the commission may take note of the fact—for it is nothing more—that the four-months licensee has actually been operating the station.

WCKT became the first station in the market to broadcast all local programming in color on December 27, 1965, through a $500,000 investment in new color cameras and color news film. By the end of 1966, station manager Charles Kelly had left WCKT for a similar position at West Palm Beach's WEAT-TV, with Edmund assuming his role as station manager. After Sidney Ansin died of a heart attack on October 22, 1971, Edmund succeeded him as Sunbeam's president.

=== Investigative journalism ===
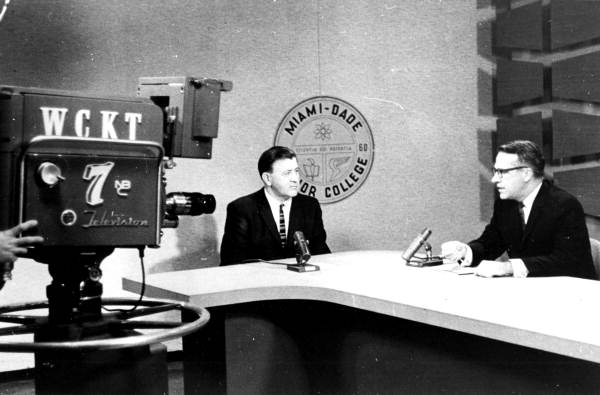
Miami Dade Junior College president Dr. Peter Masiko Jr. (left) being interviewed for the WCKT show Junior College Review

While the news department from the first WCKT carried over directly to the second WCKT, several changes started to take place under Sidney Ansin. This included a gradual increase in the on-air quality of existing local public affairs productions via an increased budget, but Sidney explained, "...it's not enough that they be important and well done: they have to entertain, be of real interest to the viewer. I don't watch a documentary simply because it's important—not even our own—and I'm sure other viewers don't either." Daily on-air editorials were instituted, with Harriette Bishop presenting the station's viewpoint, largely written by either Sidney or Charles Kelly; Fort Lauderdale News critic Joe Bryant praised Bishop for her "crisp, clean, businesslike... strong delivery" that could easily be mistaken for WCKT's news anchors. One December 4, 1963, editorial in advance of a special election for Dade County sheriff attracted controversy when the station called on Republican challenger Fred A. Phillips to withdraw, saying incumbent T. A. Buchanan was "almost certain to win", prompting Phillips to file a compliant with the FCC. Miami News columnist Rollene Saal criticized the editorials both for taking away time from the newscast itself and the subject matter; Sidney contended that television had an obligation to editorialize and present dissenting viewpoints in accord with the FCC's fairness doctrine. Bishop hoped her role would lead to females having more substantive on-air roles "a step removed from fashion and recipes" but was fired after 18 months for trying to land a reporting job at the station, remarking later, "they said I was too ambitious".

Sidney was the public face of Sunbeam but remained unfamiliar with television, while Edmund started to assert a larger role. When Sidney began inviting friends to appear on WCKT newscasts, Edmund threatened to quit in support of the news department's editorial independence, prompting Sidney to end the practice. Under news director Gene Strul, the station furthered a reputation for hard-hitting newscasts and investigative journalism, with Strul resisting outside pressure from politicians, community members, and even the station's sales department. Controversy was courted several times. Carnival operator Newell Taylor sued WCKT and Florida governor W. Haydon Burns after Burns called Taylor "one of the biggest gamblers in South Florida" in an interview broadcast over the station. Two successive documentaries on extremist group "Let Freedom Ring" and the Ku Klux Klan in late 1965 resulted in the former circulating play money containing anti-WCKT messages, while the latter was accused of defacing one roadside billboard for the station with the message, "The KKK is watching you." A three-part series in November 1968 over a proposed "power and privileges" bill in the Parliament of the Bahamas—where media outlets accused of "false or misleading" information would be called to testify before Parliament—led the Nassau Guardian-Observer to publish a front-page editorial rebuking "the meddlesome Miami television crew" and advised WCKT to "go home—and stay there!" A citizens committee in Broward County accused WCKT, WTVJ, and WLBW of engaging in biased reporting regarding education in the state, focusing on WCKT and Sidney's real estate business as a conflict of interest. Future NBC reporter Brian Ross later said of Strul's work, "he goes after the so-called sacred cows... no one is immune where he is concerned."

=== Bob Clayton ===
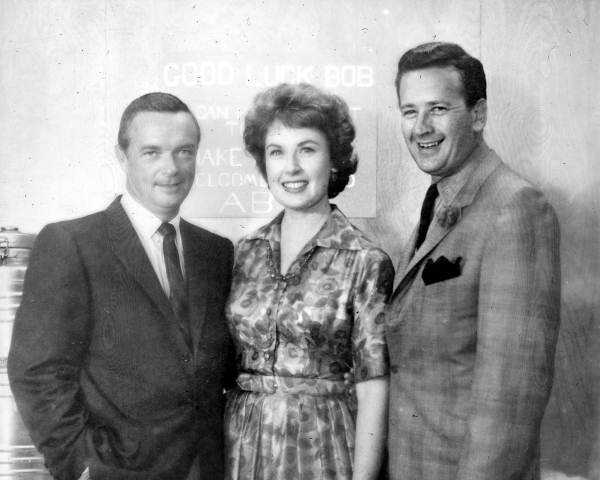
Bob Clayton with WPST-TV's Molly Turner and Cliff Ferre, promoting the ABC game show Make a Face

WCKT's local programming extended beyond newscasts. Bob Clayton was a charter on-air staffer in 1956 and was teamed with Corine Gustafson to host the early-afternoon talk show Your Biscayne Host. Gustafson left the station in October, prompting a succession of guest co-hosts in an audition process before Sue Lawton was chosen as a replacement. Clayton's duties were not limited to entertainment, as he teamed with newsman Charles Harrison to interview ten Hungarian refugees following the country's recent revolution for a special half-hour program. By May 1957, Clayton began hosting Movie 7, a daily showcase of Metro-Goldwyn-Mayer (MGM) films recently purchased by the station. Competing against Chuck Zink's Popeye Playhouse on WTVJ and The Mickey Mouse Club on WPST-TV, Clayton's friendly demeanor proved to be a hit among viewers and was voted one of the best local TV personalities in a Herald readers' poll. Clayton also hosted the Sunday night movie MGM Theater sponsored by a local mattress company and acquired rights to the rest of MGM's 300-title film library in April 1958. A popular twice-weekly segment of Movie 7 focused on pet adoption. Clayton teamed up with fellow announcer Don Barber for The Don and Bob Show, a late-morning daily comedy show that eventually moved to Saturday late-nights, but ended production at the start of 1962 due to low ratings.

Clayton played a bell captain in the 1960 Jerry Lewis movie The Bellboy, filmed at the Fountainbleu Hotel in Miami Beach; Lewis cast him later that year for the unsold television pilot Permanent Waves. After a viewer referred Clayton to their daughter—a talent agent in New York City—Clayton was cast as host for the ABC game show Make a Face, which WPST-TV carried locally starting on October 2, 1961. It was originally assumed that Clayton would leave Miami for New York, but Clayton arranged to commute between both cities by airplane every two weeks, filming Movie 7 interstitials and commercials in advance. Make a Face was canceled the following March when ABC was obligated to honor a financial commitment for another game show, but Clayton kept his WCKT duties. Clayton moved back to Miami in 1963 as Barber's replacement for the station's midday program, which was reformatted to be like NBC's Today. By the end of the year, Hugh Downs recruited Clayton as announcer for the NBC game show Concentration, which Downs hosted; the two had been friends dating back to when NBC's Tonight Starring Jack Paar, which Downs announced, originated from Miami Beach. Initially resuming the practice of filming interstitials for Movie 7 and the Saturday morning children's show Bobsville for weeks in advance, Movie 7 was dropped for The Mike Douglas Show by May 1965, and Clayton relinquished Bobsville by that September.

=== Charlie Baxter and "Toby the Robot" ===
Charlie Baxter's broadcast career began at age 14 when he joined a Toledo, Ohio–based radio dramatic group and, like Clayton, joined WCKT at its 1956 launch. Baxter was initially a booth announcer and filled in for vacationing staff. Management asked Baxter to create a horror host character but did not offer any direction, saying, "We need a monster. You're it." Baxter developed "M. T. Graves" for the Sunday afternoon horror movie showcase titled The Dungeon after improvising with makeup and establishing a design that took 45 minutes to properly apply. Baxter crafted a backstory for "M. T. Graves": born in St. Petersburg, Russia, Graves learned the art of the occult after being adopted by Romani people, was imprisoned in Budapest and fled to America, then was trapped in an underground "dungeon" which the WCKT studios were built on top of. The Dungeon became immediately popular with younger viewers who were drawn to Graves's clown-like antics and jokes, were unfazed by his appearance or "villain" role, and saw him as a hero. After relaying the story of a seven-year-old girl reacting with joy to a phone call from M. T. Graves similar to teenage Elvis fans, Herald critic Jack Anderson mused, "Now, what's that again about TV's scaring the daylights out of the very young? The only thought that lingers with me... is that her taste had better improve." In addition to Graves, Baxter portrayed "M. T. Space" (Graves's astronaut brother who orbited "the seventh moon of Jupiter") for a Saturday morning science fiction film show, and "Charlie Baxter" (in-character as a young child) for a daily children's show. Baxter was still easily recognizable to younger fans as M. T. Graves even without wearing the makeup.

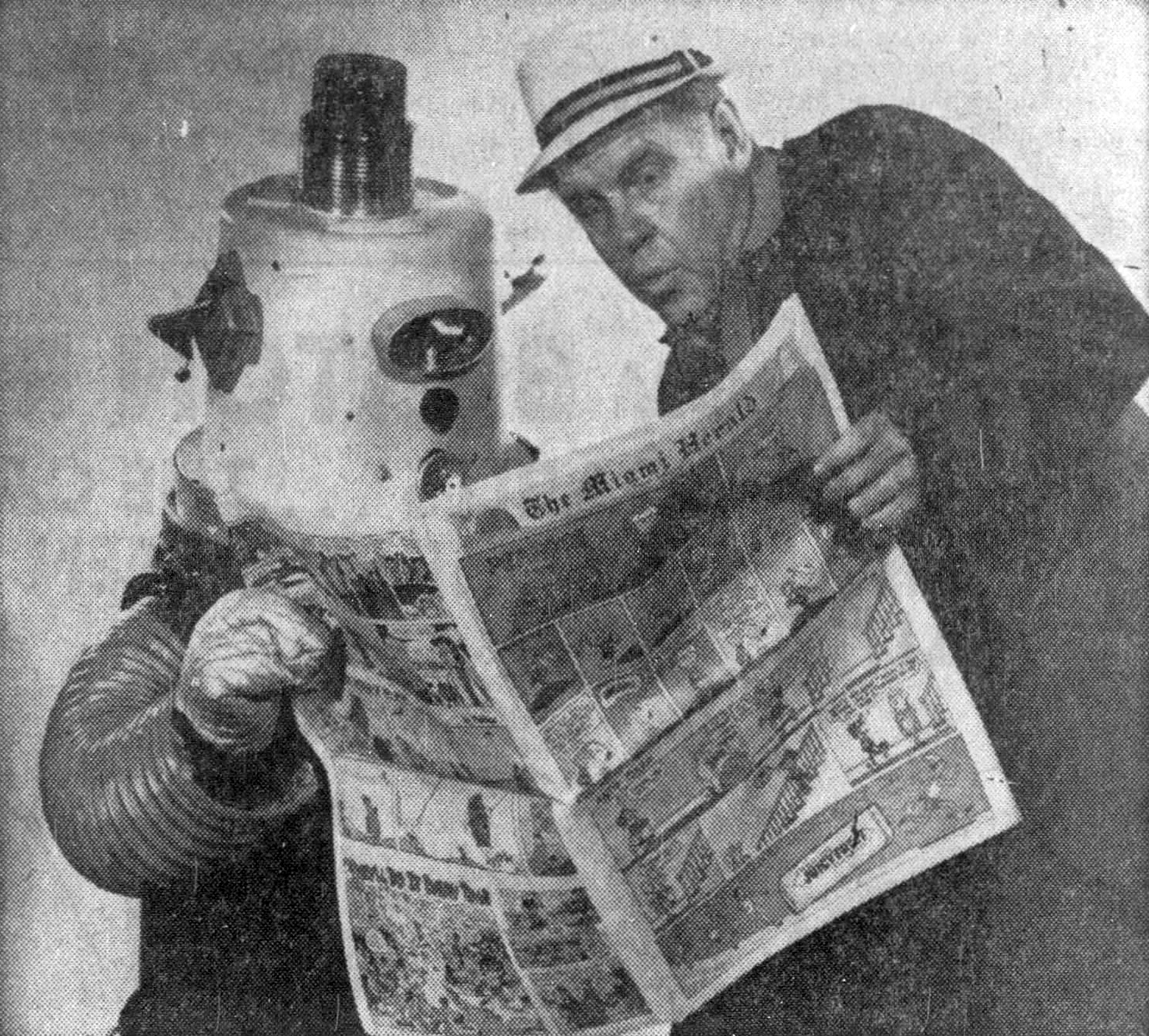
Toby the Robot (Charlie Folds) and Charlie Baxter, co-hosts of Charlie Reads the Comics

Charlie Folds, who started at WCKT in 1958 as an editor removing profanities from movies, joined The Dungeon as sidekick "Count Down the Vampire", establishing both a close friendship and partnership with Baxter. In addition to "Count Down", Folds played "Buffo the Clown" on the Sunday morning Seven's Circus and "Toby the Robot" for the Saturday morning Superheroes, the latter being in-studio wraparound segments for The Marvel Super Heroes. Drawing inspiration from a similar robot character he had portrayed several years earlier, Folds assembled Toby's costume from several garbage cans and assorted pieces of junk that weighed 40 lb (18 kg) and intoned "beep-beep-beep" as the lone method of communication. This became Folds's defining character. Success for Charlie Folds came despite substantial shyness whenever in front of a camera; while performing a skit during a live broadcast, Toby's helmet accidentally fell off revealing Folds's face, which he later deemed as his "worst moment". Toby was soon regarded as one of the more popular children's television personalities in Miami, frequently being booked for public appearances months in advance.

I communicate (when playing Toby the Robot) by beeping. By acting inside, I can make the kids laugh or cry. The kids actually know what I'm saying... kids either like a mechanical thing or a clown, if I wasn't a robot, I'd be a clown.

— Charlie Folds

The Dungeon ended production on September 7, 1967, after Baxter claimed the station ran out of horror movies to show; during the show's final year, the Jungle Jim serial was featured. Superheroes was succeeded by Batman-Batkids: Batman reruns with local segments hosted by "Charles Baxter, Esquire"; these segments reprised several Dungeon characters, with Folds as Baxter's valet "The Count". Created by Sidney Ansin, Seven's Circus had high ratings, a loyal audience and a fan club boasting 200 members—with Baxter, George DeVries and Bill Barry as successive "ringmasters"—but was canceled on January 4, 1968, after years of being a loss leader. WCKT and the Herald partnered for Charlie Reads the Comics, a Sunday morning show that launched on July 22, 1969, with Baxter reading the newspaper's Sunday comic strips to a studio audience of children and Folds as Toby. Baxter resigned from the station on April 29, 1970, while on vacation; later attributing his departure to burnout, Baxter eventually revived his "M. T. Graves" character on WKID (channel 51). Stage actor Wayne Chandler was hired as Baxter's replacement for Charlie Reads the Comics, which was re-titled Sunday Funnies. Even as other locally-produced children's television shows largely ceased during the 1970s due to declines in ratings and advertising, WCKT kept Sunday Funnies on the air under the belief it remained an instructional tool for literacy.

=== Struggles alongside NBC ===
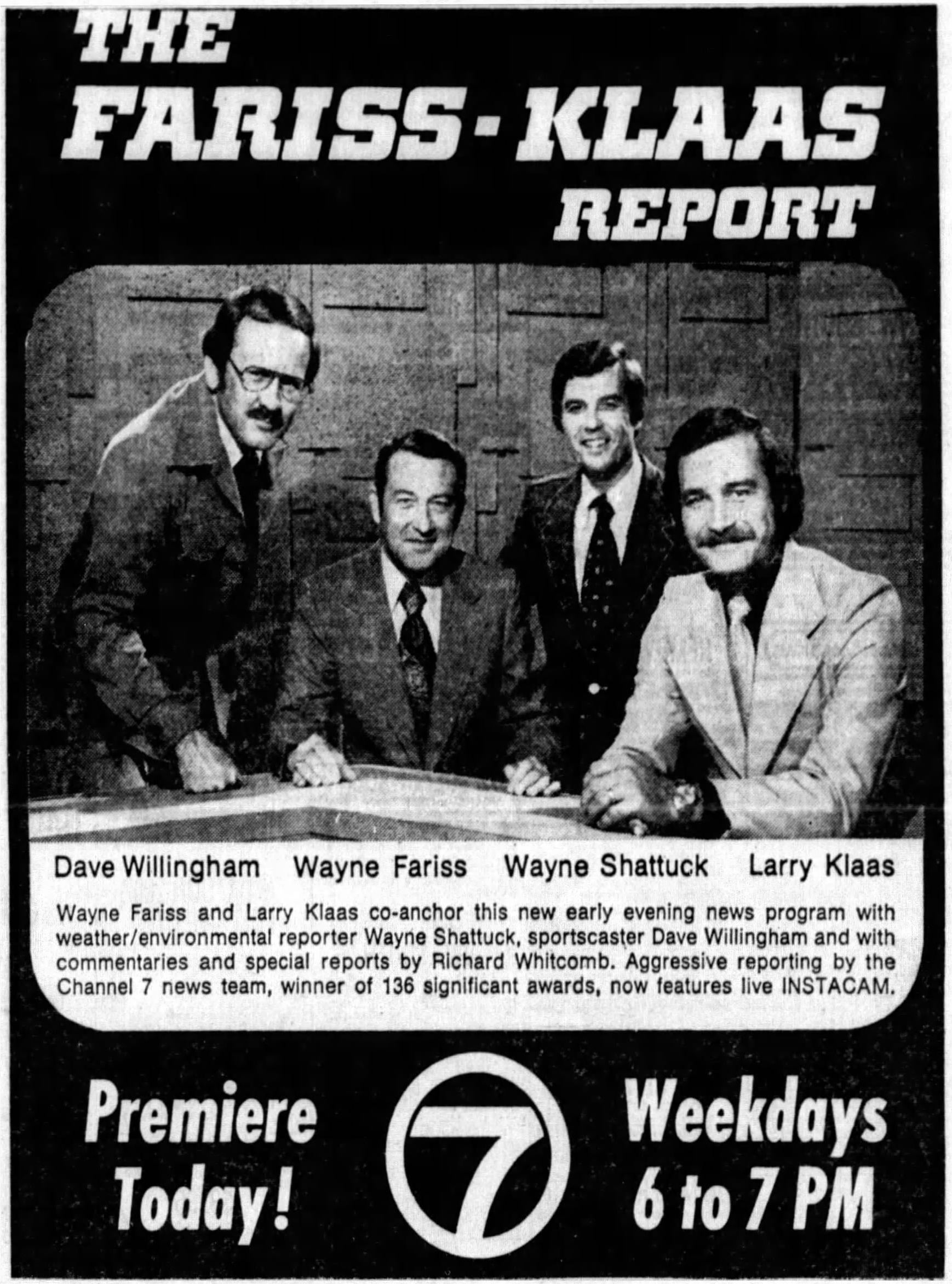
January 1976 WCKT print ad for The Fariss-Klaas Report, debuting their version of the "circle 7 logo"

Coinciding directly with NBC's adoption of an abstract "N" logo in January 1976, WCKT unveiled an iteration of the circle 7 logo similar to a design originally created for ABC's owned-and-operated stations on January 19. WCKT replaced 6 p.m. co-anchor Richard Whitcomb with Larry Klaas for The Fariss-Klaas Report, with Carmel Cafiero taking over Klaas's prior weekend duties and becoming the station's first female news anchor. Klaas's on-air delivery, described as "sedate" in a way that matched WCKT's overall presentation, contrasted with his youthful demeanor and penchant for cynicism. The station celebrated the United States Bicentennial on July 4, 1976, with a special taped production recreating news events of July 4, 1776, with anchors Fariss, Klaas and Cafiero dressed in period-appropriate attire; news director Gene Strul spent several months with pre-planning and research in advance of the taping.

By September 1977, Vic Mason replaced Klaas as 6 p.m. co-anchor after Klaas returned to reporting; Cafiero also left WCKT to return to New Orleans but quickly moved back to Miami. Recently promoted to station manager, Robert Leider explained that Mason represented an effort to attract younger viewers, particularly in the 18–34 demographic. Mason resigned abruptly in October 1978, with Connie Hicks replacing him as co-anchor. WPLG was now on a ratings upswing led by anchors Glenn Rinker and Ann Bishop (who went by Harriette while at WCKT). By the end of 1977, WPLG challenged WCKT for second place in local news ratings, with WTVJ remaining the market leader; WPLG overtook WCKT for second in 1979. WCKT reporters and cameramen, 27 in total, voted to join the National Association of Broadcast Employees and Technicians in January 1979 despite past resistance from management in three prior attempts. Reporters were allowed to participate in the vote, as the station also had them perform camera work and film editing.

Johnny Carson accused both WCKT and Dallas–Fort Worth's KXAS-TV of 'clipping' portions of The Tonight Show during the program's July 26, 1978, installment, citing a viewer letter claiming WCKT joined Tonight in the middle of Carson's monologue after playing extra commercials. Two years earlier, West Palm Beach station WTVX was accused of the same practice, prompting the FCC's Broadcast Bureau to hold hearings over their license. Edmund Ansin denied the accusations, citing timing failure from a master control clock that ran 30 seconds behind throughout the newscast that preceded the program. Carson later offered a written apology to Ansin, explaining his stance was based solely on the viewer letter and was not verified prior to going on air. Tonight was, in fact, one of the few bright spots on NBC's entire lineup, which was experiencing a prolonged and substantial ratings downturn starting in the middle of the decade. Consequently, by 1978, WCKT declined to air specific network shows more often than WTVJ or WPLG did with their respective networks, with Leider noting the substituted programs generally performed better and NBC rarely commented on them. In late 1977, WCKT aired The Devil's Brigade and Anchors Aweigh in place of NBC's Black Sheep Squadron. This led Robert Conrad—the star of Black Sheep—to personally contact WCKT operations manager Allen Sternberg along with NBC executives, and protest the move on The Tonight Show. Sternberg cited the show's Wednesday night slot as consistently one of the network's weakest-performing timeslots.

=== Revamping under Leider ===
He is unique among news directors. He is a Spartan, an individual totally immersed in his profession. He almost has blinders on that shield him from outside involvements and personal contacts within the community. He is an inside operator.

— Ralph Renick, on Gene Strul

Edmund Ansin relinquished his general manager duties in June 1979 to devote more time to Sunbeam's real estate holdings, with incumbent station manager Robert Leider taking over the position. News director Gene Strul resigned after the May 1979 sweeps period showed The Fariss-Hicks Report at 6 p.m. tied for third place in local ratings alongside Star Trek reruns on WCIX, along with an overall decline in the station's ratings. While credited for channel 7 having won over 200 regional and national journalism awards, Strul was also criticized for not adding flair to the newscasts or allowing them to be more feature-driven. Granted complete control over the station's management, Leider was tasked with hiring Strul's replacement, telling the Fort Lauderdale News he sought someone whose views were "in harmony with mine".

David Choate rejoined WCKT as Strul's replacement following a brief stint at NBC News's Miami bureau. Choate initiated multiple changes that included adopting the NewsCenter 7 brand—already in use among several of NBC's owned-and-operated stations—and replacing lead anchors Connie Hicks and Wayne Fariss with Steve Rondinaro and Donna Hanover, respectively. Fariss's removal was criticized for its abrupt nature that News critic Sherry Woods deemed "bungled" given his years of service to the station and status as the only anchor to have successfully competed against Ralph Renick. At the same time, the revamped newscasts met positive reviews for better pacing and a more visually appealing set. WCKT also made headlines by assisting Miami Beach police with an undercover surveillance team that arrested a postman for selling quaaludes; footage taken by WCKT of the arrest was used as admissible evidence in court. WCIX and WPLG management criticized WCKT's participation for going against journalism ethics and compromising the station's ability to cover police-related stories objectively.

After a seven-month hiatus, Wayne Fariss returned to anchor duty on February 2, 1981, to co-anchor the noon newscast with Connie Eng; in addition, Fariss joined WKAT radio as a newscaster. Despite the changes, NewsCenter 7 remained in third place in evening ratings; Hanover left WCKT in May 1982 to marry Justice Department attorney Rudy Giuliani. Sally Fitz, who anchored local news updates during Today along with general reporting duties, was Hanover's replacement. Sandra Earley of the Herald said of the switch, "Fitz is 29 and has short, dark hair. Hanover is 32 and blond. And that's all about there is to say about the changeover in female anchors at Ch. 7." Discrepancies also began to emerge between Arbitron and Nielsen ratings for the Miami market: both placed WCKT's 6 p.m. news at third during July 1982 surveys, but Arbitron had it 10 points behind WPLG, while Nielsen showed the race as being closer. Still, station officials were optimistic about NBC's prospects entering the 1982–83 television season, with Edmund Ansin calling newly installed network chairman Grant Tinker "superb" and "the best management team they've had in 20 years". Rick Sanchez, a Cuban exile who joined the station in 1982, produced the five-part series Why I Left Cuba that November and was part of the station's coverage of President Ronald Reagan's visit to Little Havana the following May. WCKT also aligned with the Satellite News Channel, an ABC/Westinghouse Broadcasting joint venture, providing hourly local news updates; in announcing the affiliation, Leider said, "we have to become the news information center for South Florida. That's where our future lies."

== WSVN (1983–present) ==
=== Number-centric call letters ===
We first changed all the cosmetic things you can do, even the call letters from WCKT to WSVN. We had to position ourselves to know what we were... We wanted to be looked upon as the 'hometown station,' just as the slogan says, the place where you get everything from your entertainment to your news.

— David Choate, WSVN news director

Sunbeam filed paperwork with the FCC in mid-March 1983 to change WCKT's call sign to WSVN, derived from "seven", while retaining their existing "South Florida 7" slogan. Calling it "one of the biggest moves" made by the station in recent years, general manager Robert Leider explained that the Miami market was now more familiar identifying the station by channel number, saying, "if someone asks you if you saw Hill Street Blues last night, you say, 'Yeah, I saw it last night on Ch. 7'... you don't say 'on WCKT.'" The station was also being placed on different channel positions over area cable systems, in some cases on channels "O" and "D" instead of "7". Leider regarded the "WSVN" name as easier for viewers to remember, thus providing a competitive advantage. As part of the change, Sunbeam acquired the rights for the WSVN call letters from PBS member WBRA-TV in Roanoke, Virginia, which had used them for their Norton-licensed satellite.

Sunbeam invested a total of $150,000 into this change, including $50,000 for the call letter purchase and FCC paperwork, and $100,000 for an extensive marketing campaign. The call sign change was effective at 7 a.m. on June 7, 1983, with News radio critic Tom Jicha joking, "...the station should have gone all the way and done it at 7:07 on July 7". NBC engaged in cross-promotion to help the station unveil their new "WSVN" name, mentioning it on-air on both Today and The Tonight Show. Network executives Grant Tinker and Steve Sohmer both sent congratulatory letters to Leider on the name change, and Sohmer began to advise NBC affiliates on how to stress their respective call letters for future promotions. Even with the name change, WSVN continued to struggle in the ratings at both 6 and 11 p.m., often finishing in third place after WTVJ and WPLG. News director David Choate said, "we're not the favorite station for news in Miami... we keep battling [WTVJ] for second place".

Wayne Fariss left the station on January 31, 1984, initially retiring after a 36-year broadcasting career; a brief comeback attempt as vice president of news for WEVU-TV in Naples ended after he suffered a heart attack. Lead anchor Steve Rondinaro left in August 1984 after declining an offer to return to field reporting, calling wages paid to anchors "hazard pay" due to their jobs being dependent on ratings. Rondinaro's coverage of the 1984 Democratic National Convention, praised by local media, occurred after his departure was announced. His replacement was CNN Headline News anchor Peter Ford, an Australian native. WSVN debuted Live at Five, an hour-long lifestyle-centered newscast anchored by Denise White and Frank Robertson, on August 1, 1986. While in development for nearly a year with a $2 million (equivalent to $5.87 million in 2025) investment, production manager Frank Biancuzzo said, "we're going to be the David Letterman of the 5 p.m. shows, in that we'll try anything." WSVN also began a series of remote broadcasts spotlighting the region's history titled Celebrating South Florida and billed themselves as "Your Hometown Station".

When a major story breaks in Miami, you don't turn to WSVN... If a major bank failed and a truck carrying pigs overturned on the freeway on the same day, WPLG would lead with the pigs, WTVJ probably would go with the bank and WSVN would miss the stories altogether.

— Tom Jicha, Miami News columnist

Live at Five struggled in the ratings; the May 1987 sweeps book showed minimal improvement over Quincy, M.E. reruns that it replaced, with Sun-Sentinel critic Bill Kelley saying, "the way I look at it, if you're determined to keep that ailing family dog that everyone in town has been telling you to put to sleep, you do more for him than give him a bath." Rick Sanchez, who was in consideration to co-host Live at Five, was suspended in March 1986 after revelations of ties to influence peddler Alberto San Pedro came to light. While not directly implicated in any criminal activity, Sanchez left the Miami market to take a reporting job with Houston's KHOU. Choate expressed frustration at continued perception of WSVN as a "perennial third-place station" while critics noted the newscasts had improved substantially since Fariss's 1980 removal from evenings. The station even made the news on October 17, 1985, when an electrical fire broke out in the studio during the 11 p.m. newscast, temporarily forcing the station off the air.

Veteran weatherman Wayne Chandler suffered a severe head injury in a vehicular collision on December 7, 1984. By coincidence, Chandler's hospitalization occurred hours after Wayne Fariss was hospitalized for his heart attack. Chandler's Sunday Funnies co-host Toby the Robot previously "retired" on April 1, 1984, when Charlie Folds accepted a full-time role as WSVN's public relations director. Folds later said of his last day playing the robot, "when I put on that costume, I became Toby." Despite hopes of an on-air return, Chandler never fully recovered from his injuries and was forced to retire. Folds (as himself) took over as host of Sunday Funnies, which continued production through 1986. Long-running public affairs shows Impacto, Perspectives and Florida Forum, which operations manager Dave Bieber called "holdovers from a significant number of years ago", were all canceled at the end of 1986 in advance of NBC's planned spring 1987 launch of Sunday Today. The presence of Live at Five as a daily program that already covered similar topics to those shows was regarded as an upgrade.

=== The Miami network affiliation dispute ===
WSVN became the central figure in a complicated dispute between Sunbeam, NBC and CBS that lasted nearly two years. WTVJ's founding owner, Wometco, was acquired in 1983 by merchant banker Kohlberg Kravis Roberts & Co. (KKR) in a $1 billion leveraged buyout (equivalent to $3.23 billion in 2025). KKR also took over Storer Communications in 1985. The FCC directed KKR to divest either Storer's cable systems in Miami and Wometco's cable systems in Atlanta—or WTVJ and Storer's WAGA-TV—within 18 months to satisfy then-existing cross-ownership rules. (Note: While Wometco and Storer were legally separate entities, the FCC considered KKR the primary owner of both companies.) KKR initially sold WTVJ and Storer's station group to Lorimar-Telepictures for $1.85 billion (equivalent to $5.43 billion in 2025) on April 25, 1986, with WTVJ alone selling for $405 million (equivalent to $1.19 billion in 2025). However, the Lorimar deal collapsed after CBS inquired with Taft Broadcasting about purchasing WCIX, an independent affiliated with Fox, for approximately $125 million (equivalent to $367 million in 2025). Such a deal would have moved all CBS programming from WTVJ to WCIX, and in turn, reduced the value of WTVJ by hundreds of millions of dollars.

CBS's subsequent $170 million offer to KKR for WTVJ was deemed unacceptable by the banker, which offered WTVJ to Capital Cities/ABC and NBC parent General Electric (GE) under the belief neither ABC or NBC would be intimidated by a threat from CBS to disaffiliate WTVJ. After months of rumors, KKR agreed to sell WTVJ to the General Electric Property Management Co., a holding company within GE, for $270 million (equivalent to $765 million in 2025) on January 16, 1987. It was universally accepted in the media and the industry that NBC was the pending owner: for the first time in the history of North American television, a broadcast network purchased an affiliate of a competing network. NBC's purchase of WTVJ came 15 days after NBC signed a two-year contract renewal with WSVN and came as the network, now rated number-one, was initiating multiple affiliation switches across the country.

Ansin later described his reaction to the WTVJ purchase as "bewilderment", telling NBC executives who visited the station it was "bizarre and certainly unprecedented". Ansin cursed at the executives, pointed at a satellite dish used to receive NBC programming, and asked them, "why don't you take it home on the airplane?" No formal announcement was made to WSVN's staff that day beyond a terse internal memo, with some staffers admitting to checking job openings in Broadcasting magazine amid a combination of anxiety and gallows humor. One unidentified WSVN manager described it as a difficult day because they also had to report the story on the evening newscasts. During their coverage of the sale, Ansin revealed GE executives previously offered to purchase WSVN, which he rejected under the belief that they would not buy a competitor. Likewise, one NBC executive told the News NBC had preferred to buy WSVN, but the station was not available. WSVN's NBC contract ran until January 1989 while WTVJ's CBS contract ran through April 1988. Industry speculation centered over what station in Miami would pick up CBS programming, or if NBC would be contractually obligated to operate WTVJ as a CBS affiliate until their WSVN contract expired. NBC pledged to honor WSVN's contract, while CBS showed renewed interest in WCIX, itself in the process of being sold to TVX Broadcast Group.

In an interview on WSVN's 6 p.m. newscast on March 10, 1987, Ansin announced Sunbeam would challenge the WTVJ sale before the FCC, citing "anti-competitive overtones ... adverse" to the public interest. With former channel 7 operations manager Allen Sternberg as legal counsel, Ansin retained former FCC commissioner Charles D. Ferris as his lead representation. Ansin also reached out to Florida's congressional delegation for additional lobbying, including Rep. Dante Fascell and Sen. Lawton Chiles. The petition to deny claimed WSVN's status among programmers and advertisers was damaged to WTVJ's benefit and that an NBC-owned CBS affiliate threatened to disenfranchise Miami television viewers. In a statement Ansin submitted to various Washington agencies, he likened the nature of the sale to the extortion-driven 1956 asset swap between NBC and Group W for stations in Cleveland and Philadelphia the commission eventually overturned nine years later. In a subsequent interview, Ansin explained that his bitterness with NBC was the result of the network simply discarding decades of loyalty, especially when the network was mired in third place in the late 1970s. Ansin's visibility protesting the sale was also a marked departure from his reputation as a modest, conservative owner that rarely sought public attention and who barely knew his own station personnel.

The day before WCIX's sale to TVX was completed, TVX president Tim McDonald told the News that WCIX was not only not for sale, but TVX was committed to owning the station, forcing CBS to negotiate with Ansin by default. In multiple interviews, Ansin expressed a hope to keep WSVN as a network affiliate and eventually pass control of Sunbeam to his children; when asked about WSVN possibly becoming an independent station, Ansin replied, "that's not good... I don't think it'll happen." One Wall Street analyst suggested that Ansin's objections really centered around the risk of losing untold millions of dollars if WSVN failed to secure an affiliation. The FCC approved the sale of WTVJ to GE on September 17, 1987, despite Sen. Chiles introducing an amendment into an FCC appropriations bill that requested a full hearing on the sale. Ferris also acknowledged he held doubts from the beginning about the FCC being receptive to Ansin's challenge; undeterred, Ansin pledged to appeal the FCC's approval. NBC and CBS both agreed to extend WTVJ's CBS affiliation contract on a two-week basis after it expired in April 1988, allowing CBS to move their programming off WTVJ at any given date. The temporary arrangement resulted in WTVJ—now run by NBC management—refusing to carry significant portions of CBS's prime time schedule, while CBS initially refused to invite WTVJ management to the network's 1988 affiliate convention.

=== Changes in the news ===
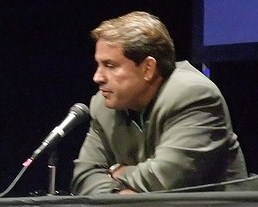
Rick Sanchez rejoined WSVN in May 1988 as a reporter and anchor.

The uncertainty at WSVN was not limited to their network affiliation. News director David Choate abruptly resigned in December 1987; his replacement, Joel Cheatwood, came to Miami from WEWS-TV in Cleveland, where he had been that station's assistant news director. Cheatwood took the job under assurances WSVN would remain a network affiliate under Sunbeam in what he called a "blood oath" by Ansin. By that March, WSVN's newscasts started to take a more aggressive tone, ostensibly to make the station more palatable to a CBS affiliation, while multiple staffers were either dismissed or resigned. Some also left WSVN directly due to the affiliation uncertainty, including sports director Bret Lewis and weekend sports anchor Doug Vaughn. By happenstance, Lewis and anchor Jill Beach left to take jobs with NBC: Lewis went to KNBC-TV in Los Angeles, while Beach went to WKYC-TV in Cleveland, which at the time was a higher-ranked TV market than Miami. Lewis's replacement, Jim Berry, joined WSVN under the assumption it would become a CBS affiliate, saying a network affiliation is "a sign of privilege, it's like a badge."

Following the conclusion of the May sweeps period, Cheatwood fired lead anchor Peter Ford despite the 6 p.m. and 11 p.m. newscasts posting their best ratings in recent years. Reports of on- and off-air tension between Ford and co-anchor Sally Fitz was seen as the determining factor for the move, but Fitz was also in a personal relationship with Ed Ansin, which Ansin previously admitted to. Steve Sonsky of the Herald suggested Fitz's relationship with Ansin factored into WSVN's personnel decisions, which station officials denied. After Alberto San Pedro's murder trial concluded, Rick Sanchez returned to the station as the new co-anchor for Live at Five, which was initially developed with him in mind as the lead host. Sanchez replaced Frank Robertson, who was dismissed by Cheatwood in early May after market research showed him as the program's "weak link". In an outreach attempt to Miami's Cuban community, Cheatwood announced Sanchez's return during an on-air interview at Spanish-language radio station WQBA.

=== CBS purchases WCIX ===
After NBC purchased WTVJ, the Herald's Steve Sonsky wrote "the simplest thing that could happen" was for CBS to affiliate with WSVN in a two-station exchange. By June 1988, Sonsky said a WSVN-CBS affiliation was still possible, "... unless 7 wants to become an independent station and suffer an enormous drop in value". An impasse developed between Ansin and CBS: the network desired to move off of WTVJ as soon as possible, but Ansin insisted a CBS contract take effect on January 1, 1989, when WSVN's NBC contract was set to end. Sports broadcasts were the core reason. NBC was committed to carrying the 1988 Summer Olympics, the 1988 World Series, and a majority of Miami Dolphins football games thanks to the network's NFL-AFC broadcast rights. Tony Malara, president of CBS's affiliate relations division who handled the negotiations, insisted CBS was deeply distressed at having to remain on an NBC-owned station; WSVN general manager Bob Leider countered, saying that such distress was never mentioned by CBS during negotiations, and Ansin insisted CBS agreed to his timeframe early on in the talks, which Malara denied. Ansin made arrangements to fly to New York City on April 26 to sign a CBS contract at Black Rock when Malara called off the meeting, citing that they were reaching out to other parties regarding a purchase or affiliation. Malara said to Ansin the trip was pointless if he would not waver off of the January 1 date.

One week after the negotiations broke down, Ansin filed an antitrust lawsuit against NBC, CBS, and the GE subsidiary that held WTVJ's license alleging collusion between the networks over WTVJ's sale with intent to cause WSVN "irreparable injury". Ansin sent an additional letter of protest to NBC that claimed WTVJ supplied stories to NBC News through the network's Miami news bureau, which Ansin alleged violated NBC's existing WSVN contract. Initially bolstered by a verdict that awarded $3.5 million in damages to the owner of a former ABC station in Springfield, Missouri, after Capital Cities/ABC Inc. disaffiliated them (which was later thrown out on appeal) Ansin insisted the lawsuit would not hurt WSVN's chances regarding a network contract, but talks between him and CBS never resumed.

Meanwhile, TVX was under financial duress by principal creditor Salomon Brothers, which helped finance TVX's purchase of WCIX and four other Taft stations and in turn held more than 60 percent ownership of TVX. After a missed payment of $200 million to Salomon earlier in 1988, the creditor induced TVX to sell off two stations and pressured them to divest further. By July 1988, Electronic Media reported CBS quietly was in talks with Salomon to purchase WCIX. Howard Stringer, recently appointed as president for CBS's owned-stations division, told the News on August 5 he expected a resolution of the Miami affiliation dilemma "... probably by next week". WCIX's general manager said CBS's negotiations with Salomon made it much more than a threat aimed at Ansin. On August 8, 1988, CBS announced their purchase of WCIX for $59 million (equivalent to $161 million in 2025), a price far below TVX's $90 million valuation of the station two years earlier. Several Wall Street analysts estimated WSVN's market value dropped by as much as $200 million (equivalent to $544 million in 2025) after CBS's announcement, with one analyst suggesting the station now had one-third of the cash flow it had while an NBC affiliate.

CBS simultaneously announced a new affiliation agreement was reached with West Palm Beach's ABC affiliate, WPEC, that addressed WCIX's technical disadvantages for over-the-air television viewers in the northern portion of the Miami market. The WPEC-CBS deal pulled a second media market into the affiliation switches that now involved, in both Miami and West Palm Beach, six stations and three million television viewers.

=== Becoming an independent ===
Immediately after the sale of WCIX, Ansin publicly announced that WSVN's news operations would not be contracted and would instead be expanded. Ansin and Leider offered Joel Cheatwood an opportunity to leave if he wanted, due to Ansin's "blood oath" of WSVN having an affiliation with CBS or NBC not being kept, but Cheatwood decided to stay. At a staff meeting called by Cheatwood the following Monday, the majority of the personnel present verbally committed to staying in a show of support. Dave Bieber resigned as operations manager shortly after WSVN's independent status was confirmed: management, assuming WSVN would still link up with CBS, failed to purchase enough syndicated programming at the start of the fall season to compensate for the loss of a network. Ansin later described WSVN as a station that had little to no effort put into it because of their prior NBC association, saying, "[w]e were very much the traditional network affiliate... we considered ourselves an appendage of the network".

The station's plans were revealed as September 1988 began. Rebranded to Channel 7 News with an aggressive pressroom feel, both Live at Five and the hour-long 6 p.m. news were relaunched as faster-paced, half-hour newscasts. Addressing the loss of NBC, WSVN announced its 11 p.m. news would move to an hour-long 10 p.m. slot on January 1, along with an expansion of its early-morning local newscast Today in Florida in Today's timeslot and locally produced news magazine Inside Story replacing the NBC Nightly News. Hosted by WSVN anchor Penny Daniels, Inside Story was a pet project of Cheatwood, similar in tone to A Current Affair. WSVN signed up as a CNN affiliate for national and international news coverage, simulcasting Headline News in the overnight hours. Altogether, the station committed to producing 7 1/2 hours of local newscasts on weekdays under the belief their current audience would not defect to other channels. Station promos began to reorient WSVN as "your news station" and extensively advertised their upcoming 10 p.m. newscast during NBC's own prime time schedule.

WSVN quickly acquired the rights to 650 feature films for a nightly prime time movie showcase at 8 p.m., boasting a library of over 750 titles. Leider noted that over two dozen movie packages meant for over-the-air broadcasters had been previously unclaimed in the market, making the purchases a relatively easy process. The station also signed up with Fox, replacing WCIX in the role, but still billed itself as an independent as Fox only programmed in prime time on the weekends. In a marked contrast to its weekday schedule, WSVN was programmed like a conventional independent on the weekends with a mix of cartoons, syndicated professional wrestling, off-network reruns, and movies, in addition to Fox programming and half-hour newscasts at 6 and 10 p.m.

The timing of WCIX's purchase by CBS resulted in the series of affiliation switches all taking place on January 1, 1989, the date Ansin had preferred from the beginning. While CBS was unable to assert control of WCIX until the following day, multiple CBS and NBC programs were cleared by their future affiliates, including several NBC shows WSVN either dropped or declined to carry. The final night prior to the switches, on December 31, 1988, had both WSVN and WTVJ broadcast the King Orange Jamboree Parade simultaneously; WTVJ's local parade coverage included multiple NBC network stars, while WSVN aired NBC's network coverage.

=== Ratings ramifications ===
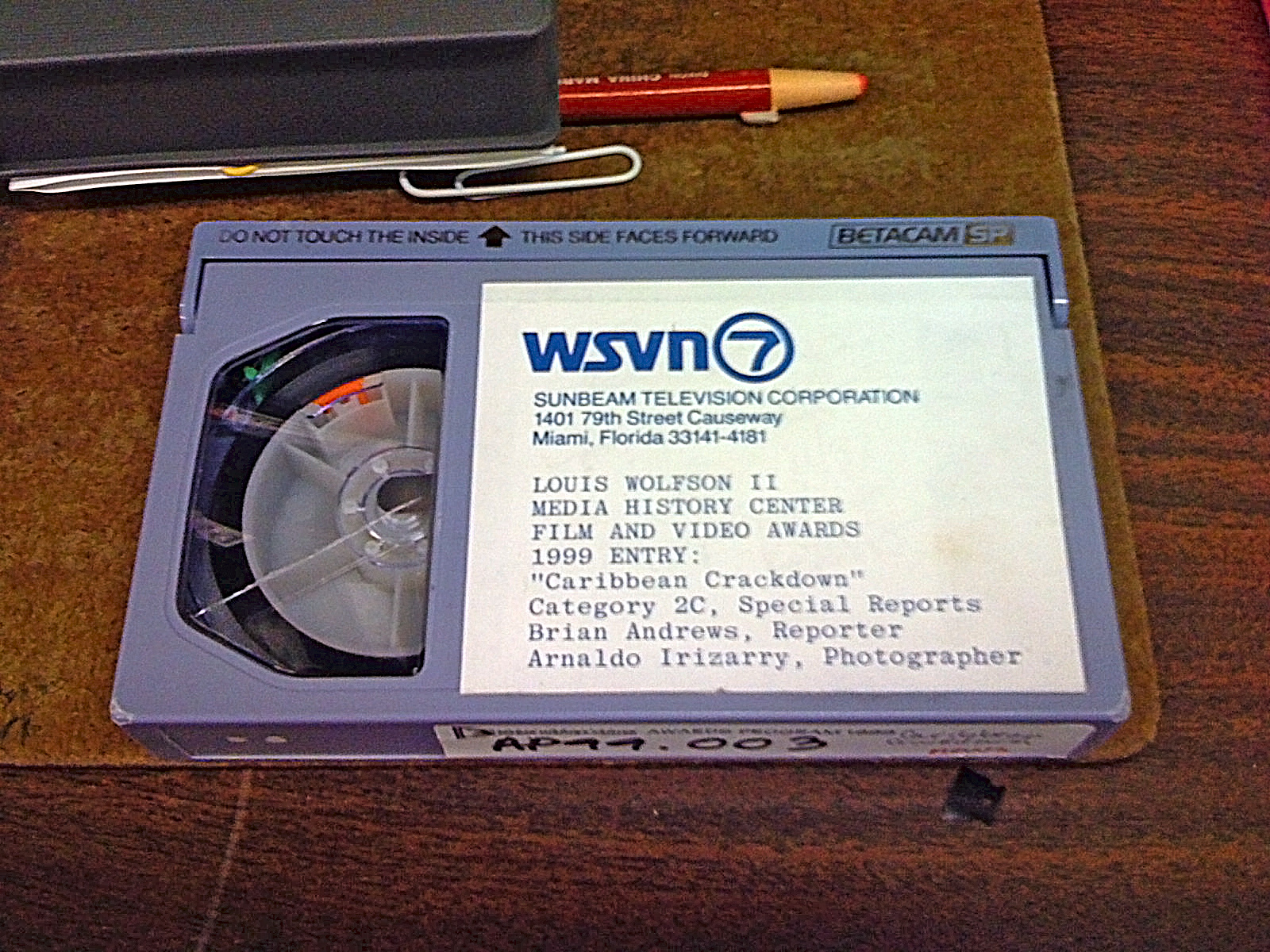
WSVN archival betacam news tape, c. 1989, at the Florida Moving Image Archive

WSVN's news expansion, at the time unheard of for any television station in the United States, was ridiculed and pilloried in the local media. Prior to this, television stations without a network affiliation generally operated with a focus on sitcom reruns and movies, which did not rate as highly; the Herald's Steve Sonsky said, "... that's the way all indie stations operate... without the big original network programming as lead-ins and lead-outs, [they] just can't compete on the same level". Up to the switch, WCIX's news output only consisted of a single half-hour 10 p.m. newscast, raising doubts that four full-time English-language television news operations would be feasible in a market like Miami. Market consensus also assumed WCIX would be more than able to compensate for their signal coverage issues simply by becoming CBS-owned. Ansin later said, "everybody predicted, I say the world predicted, that this was not going to work... we had to be creative and innovative."

WSVN's ratings, as predicted, declined significantly after losing NBC fare, but as an independent, the station was quickly seen by the Sun-Sentinel's Tom Jicha as a major success story. By April 1989, the station's early-evening news had begun to outdraw WTVJ's newscasts, with Inside Story an unexpected hit. By November 1989, WSVN's 6:30 p.m. news was beating the NBC Nightly News on WTVJ in both Nielsen and Arbitron ratings, with WSVN's Today in Florida competitive against WTVJ's Today. This contrasted heavily against WCIX, which, despite being network-owned and with higher ratings than the year prior, was badly hampered by its poor signal and saw itself in fourth place. At year's end, WSVN was in second place behind WPLG in most time slots and the 10 p.m. news was increasingly visible against the other networks, prompting Jicha to write, "[I]n this case, the conventional wisdom wasn't wise." WSVN's performance prompted WTVJ management to issue a memo in May 1990 directing their newscasts to find additional "intensity, involvement and innovation" in their presentation, implying a need to emulate WSVN.

The station's success resulted in Sunbeam launching a production company by May 1989, headed by Cheatwood, who relinquished his news director role; Sunbeam planned to sell Inside Story to syndication as Inside Report and develop two additional television programs. As 1990 began, Fox hired Cheatwood to help develop a possible newscast for the network; this also resulted in Inside Report being withdrawn from syndication. Cheatwood was executive producer for the syndicated newsmagazine Personalities, which was canceled due to low ratings. After Fox put their newscast development on hold, Cheatwood returned to WSVN as vice president of news. Under Cheatwood, WSVN launched a 7:30 p.m. newscast in the lead-up to the 1991 Persian Gulf conflict; after the war ended, the newscast was converted to 7:30, a newsmagazine hosted by Daniels and Joan Lovett described by Cheatwood as "news with a real flair". The station also openly floated the possibility of bidding for broadcast rights to Miami's expansion baseball team, with comparisons drawn to both Superstation WGN and TBS, two superstations that featured local baseball play-by-play for a national audience. By 1992, WSVN ranked first in mornings and late evenings, and second in late afternoons, and was regarded as the highest-rated independent in the country.

=== Fast-paced tabloid journalism ===
The Book of Revelations [sic] does not say whether the apocalypse will be televised. But if it is, WSVN in Miami will not have to interrupt its regular programming.

— Jonathan Cohn, The American Prospect

The style for WSVN's newscasts became as attention-grabbing as the output of news the station now produced. Terminology in reporting was shifted to a more casual approach, with authority figures like the chief of police being called "Miami's top cop". Raw video footage would sometimes be altered to present a film noir effect, or in slow-motion, particularly with vehicular accidents. One competing news director claimed to The Christian Science Monitor that WSVN employed inexperienced reporters with little pay, placing them in cars with police scanners to "... see how many crime scenes they could get to". A typical hour-long newscast now featured as many as fifty stories, all short in duration. Coverage of area and statewide government functions, including area city council and school board meetings, was eliminated, and WSVN's bureau in Tallahassee was closed. Anchors, in particular Fitz and Sanchez, accentuated their on-air delivery with theatrics including raised eyebrows, head shaking, and dramatic pauses. By 1994, the station's newscasts and newsroom were incorporated into a 25,000-square-foot (2,300 m^{2}) set dubbed the "Newsplex".

The phrase "if it bleeds, it leads" originated in a 1989 New York story about WABC-TV in New York City, but Boston magazine, Newsweek, the Miami New Times, the New York Times, the Associated Press, and The American Prospect all used the phrase to describe WSVN. Cheatwood defended WSVN's emphasis on crime, saying it "has helped in preventing other people from becoming victims, and let people know what was happening on the street". Such reporting contrasted with FBI statistics that showed violent crime in Miami to be in decline (albeit still the highest in the nation), but a 1993 NBC poll of area residents showed 73 percent believed the murder rate in Miami had increased. A University of Florida study revealed WSVN was issued 239 subpoenas for video footage or testimony in court proceedings between August 1988 and March 1992, well above the average of 17 subpoenas for competing media outlets in the market. University of Miami journalism professor Joseph Angotti tabulated the amount of airtime WSVN devoted to violent crime, discovering it made up 48.9 percent of their news coverage in the month of November 1993. The Prospect noted that WSVN's July 18, 1993, newscast devoted 22 out of the station's allotted 34 minutes of news airtime to stories about people being robbed, injured or killed, with a visit by President Bill Clinton to Miami relegated to a quick soundbite 14 minutes into the broadcast.

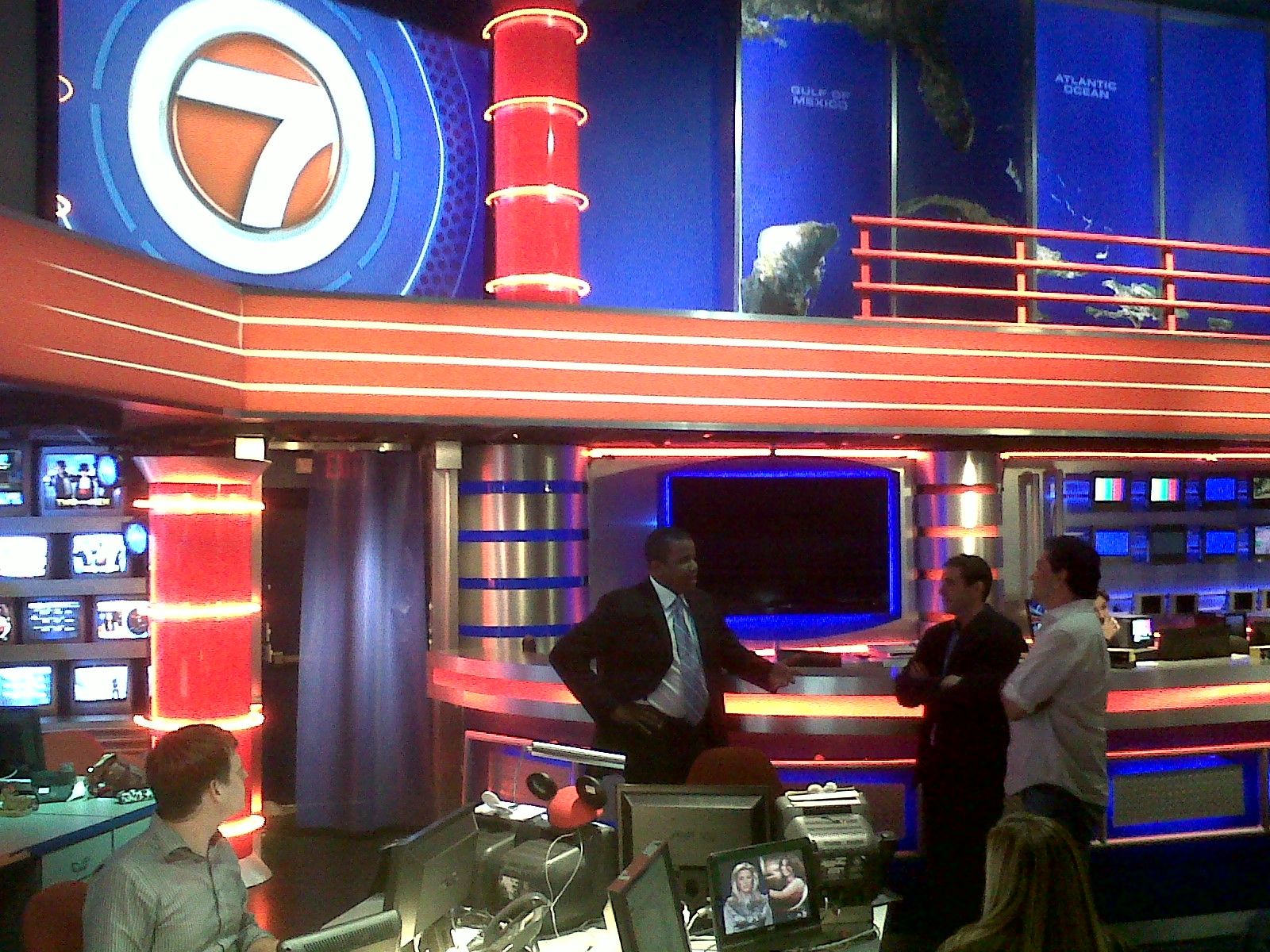
The WSVN newsroom, commonly referred to as the "Newsplex"

Cheatwood told the Monitor that WSVN's tabloid style was designed to counter public perception of local news being boring, staid, and slow. Newscasts opened with flashy graphics and punchy headlines like "Tiny Victims", "Kids Who Kill" or "Mauled to Death". Scott Chapin, a rock radio disc jockey for WGTR-FM and WIOD's program director, became WSVN's announcer, chosen as his voice better stood out against the competition. Chris Crane, a computer hacker with no formal music training and who by his own admission "couldn't read a score", was hired to compose WSVN's news themes. WSVN's on-air graphics took on a red and blue color scheme, as they were determined by Bob Leider to be "the boldest colors". WSVN's visual cues were frequently compared to MTV, Hard Copy, Miami Vice, NFL Films, and The March of Time and were derisively labeled "new wave news" and "all-crime-all-the-time". The Times described WSVN as "stories... zooming across the screen at a dizzying speed, accompanied by graphics and sound bigger, brighter and bolder than anything Miami viewers can find elsewhere".

Paul Steinle, University of Miami communications professor, criticized WSVN for not coherently presenting information beyond the flashy presentation, loud music and bold headlines, specifically with failures to clearly attribute sources, using footage with minimal information or context, and substandard writing. 7:30 was criticized for focusing on sensational and lurid subject matter and gossip with cynicism: when introducing a report about the Genitorturers, reporter Jessica Aguirre said, "hey, we do what it takes to get ratings, and you're watching". In June 1994, seven area hotels owned by the Continental Companies began a blackout of WSVN's newscasts objecting to the heavy emphasis on crime, saying their frustration with WSVN "reached the breaking point"; this followed the Thunderbird and Chateau by the Sea hotels blacking out the station altogether. The month prior, WCIX retooled their newscasts to a "family sensitive" format intentionally eschewing violent footage, which led to lower ratings and was ultimately abandoned after a year.

Criticism of the station's stylized approach was also internal. One of the station's remaining Black anchors, Denise White, left WSVN in 1990 for a job in Tampa, telling the New Times, "if you watch Crime Check regularly, you'll believe that black folks do nothing but commit crime," echoing the sentiments of a coalition of area Black leaders protesting the Rick Sanchez-led segment. While delivering a weather report in June 1989, Bob Soper disputed a Teleprompter cue that a hurricane was "barreling out of control toward Miami" as his data showed otherwise. Three years later, Soper was replaced by Jillian Warry—who, at age 25, wore short skirts on-air while delivering the weather—under claims his genial personality no longer aligned with the station, with Cheatwood saying, "the Willard Scott era is gone." Soper left the station six weeks before Hurricane Andrew hit Miami, damaging WSVN's credibility at the same time Bryan Norcross and WTVJ won industry acclaim and a Peabody Award for their coverage; Cheatwood claimed a chief meteorologist was unnecessary, as all stations were fed the same information from the National Hurricane Center. Carmel Cafiero disagreed with the "if it bleeds, it leads" descriptor for WSVN, later saying, "people use that phrase because it's catchy, but I just don't buy it. I think people were jealous, frankly."

=== Influence on the industry ===
WSVN's tabloid format proved heavily influential to the industry and was widely imitated throughout the country. (Note: The following local and national media outlets have attributed WSVN with this distinction:) The station and its unlikely success was the subject of a Harvard Business School case study. In one week in 1993, Cheatwood received requests for news tape in cities ranging from Los Angeles to Louisville, Kentucky. Frank Magid consultant Eric Braun likened WSVN to an updated form of the Eyewitness News and Action News formats 20 years earlier and compared it to radio commentator Walter Winchell. Braun consulted other news departments nationwide on incorporating elements of the WSVN format but advised against the format being copied outright, telling the Herald, "It's something you could only do in Miami. No other city in North America has the rhythm of Miami." One of Braun's clients was WTVJ, which began emphasizing crime coverage, larger graphics, and a pressroom feel in its newscasts amid frequent on-air turnover and criticisms of a lost identity. Another client was WKYC-TV, a former NBC-owned station that experienced significant off- and on-air turnover under Multimedia, Inc., and adopted WSVN's emphasis on a higher volume of shorter stories, minimal crosstalk, and bold headlines like "TOP STORY" or "SPECIAL REPORT". While WKYC's ratings did not immediately improve, the station was regarded as having finally found a direction not seen under NBC ownership.

Other stations across the country attempted to import WSVN's format outright. Bill Applegate, who oversaw WABC-TV's late 1980s tabloid format, joined WBBM-TV, the CBS-owned outlet in Chicago; WBBM incorporated much of WSVN's visual presentation and hired away some of the station's on-air talent, including Penny Daniels, Joan Lovett, Jim Berry, and Rick Leventhal, along with hiring WSVN producer Mark Toney to be its news director. WBBM's changes eschewed their long-standing reputation of investigative, serious journalism and ultimately produced mixed results in the ratings. Scott Jones, a former WSVN producer, was hired as news director for KRBK-TV in Sacramento, California, and quickly promoted to co-owned KPLR-TV in St. Louis, but his tenure lasted less than nine months as ownership disagreed with his implementation of the WSVN format. By 2002, Applegate, now heading WOIO/WUAB in Cleveland, relaunched the station's low-rated news operation with a fast-paced tabloid style that drew comparisons to WSVN.

The most notable imitation of WSVN came from within. In April 1993, Sunbeam purchased WHDH-TV, then Boston's CBS affiliate, from David Mugar for $215 million. Former Massachusetts governor Michael Dukakis, a part-time Florida resident, publicly protested the sale, referring to WSVN's newscasts as "a collection of the bizarre, tragic and bloody". Ed Ansin's brother Ron, who previously served in Dukakis's cabinet, arranged a dinner between the two as a mediator. After the deal closed, Cheatwood was appointed as vice president of news for both stations; Cheatwood stressed WHDH would not become a direct copy of WSVN but hold a style unique to the market, saying a philosophy for newscasts is "not a franchise you can lift and open like a Kentucky Fried Chicken down the street." Long the third-rated news service in Boston, WHDH became the market leader by the end of the decade, prompting the more traditional WBZ-TV and WCVB-TV to incorporate tabloid elements into their newscasts.

WSVN's success also signaled an industry trend to increase local news production, particularly as a way to stand out against stiffer competition from cable. This included coverage of national and international stories, formerly material seen as network-exclusive, with WSVN dispatching crews to report on the Waco siege, an Amtrak derailment in Alabama, and the assault of Nancy Kerrigan. In the wake of Today in Florida's success, Fox-owned stations began launching their own local morning shows including Good Day New York and Good Day L.A., while KCAL-TV in Los Angeles debuted a three-hour prime time newscast. Fox president Lucie Salhany described WSVN as "the station of the future" and said it could be a model for newscasts on other Fox affiliates. Fox's 1994 groupwide affiliation agreement with New World Communications saw multiple long-tenured, large-market "Big Three" affiliates switching to Fox between 1994 and 1996, furthering the news production boom; Ball State University professor Bob Papper estimated between 1,500 and 2,000 jobs were created nationwide, with the possibility of thousands more jobs among older Fox affiliates yet to create or expand their news services. By 1994, WSVN was generating more revenue than it ever had with NBC thanks to increased control over programming and local advertising via Fox's limited prime time schedule, which was regarded as a factor in the Fox-New World pact.

When Fox launched Fox News in 1996, WSVN reporter Shepard Smith was hired as its lead reporter; by 1999, Smith was anchoring Fox Report, the channel's nightly flagship newscast, which focused on a high story count, tight writing, and a flashy presentation.

=== Adjustments, Deco Drive, and continuity ===
Already it's hard to remember a time when television news wasn't paced like an action movie, edited like an MTV video, and scored like a horror flick.

— Jim Mullin, the Miami New Times, on Joel Cheatwood's departure from Sunbeam

In February 1997, Joel Cheatwood left his role at Sunbeam Television to become news director for Chicago's NBC-owned station, WMAQ-TV. Cheatwood's tenure at WMAQ lasted 16 months and was punctuated by a short-lived experiment with Jerry Springer as a commentator; he later attempted to implement a tabloid format at WCBS-TV in New York City. Cheatwood was succeeded as vice president of news by existing news director Alice Jacobs, a position she still holds.

By the end of the 1990s, all English-language stations in Miami–Fort Lauderdale adapted portions of the WSVN format. WHDH news director Bill Pohovey joined WPLG in 1998 as vice president of news; under Pohovey, WPLG remained number one among English-language stations in 1999, emphasizing investigative journalism and human interest stories, combining it with elements of WSVN's tabloid format. Pohovey remains at WPLG in that position into the present day. In 1998, three years after WCIX moved to channel 4 as WFOR-TV, (Note: See WFOR-TV § Move to channel 4.) that station's newscasts were reformatted to feature bold colors and a news theme with a salsa feel; by 2004, WFOR and WTVJ employed multiple WSVN alumni. In response, WSVN began emphasizing breaking news, investigative and consumer stories. Carmel Cafiero's reports were branded Carmel on the Case and given priority; a 2010 story on a Broward County pill mill as part of an ongoing series on the opioid crisis earned Cafiero and the station an Alfred I. duPont–Columbia University Award.

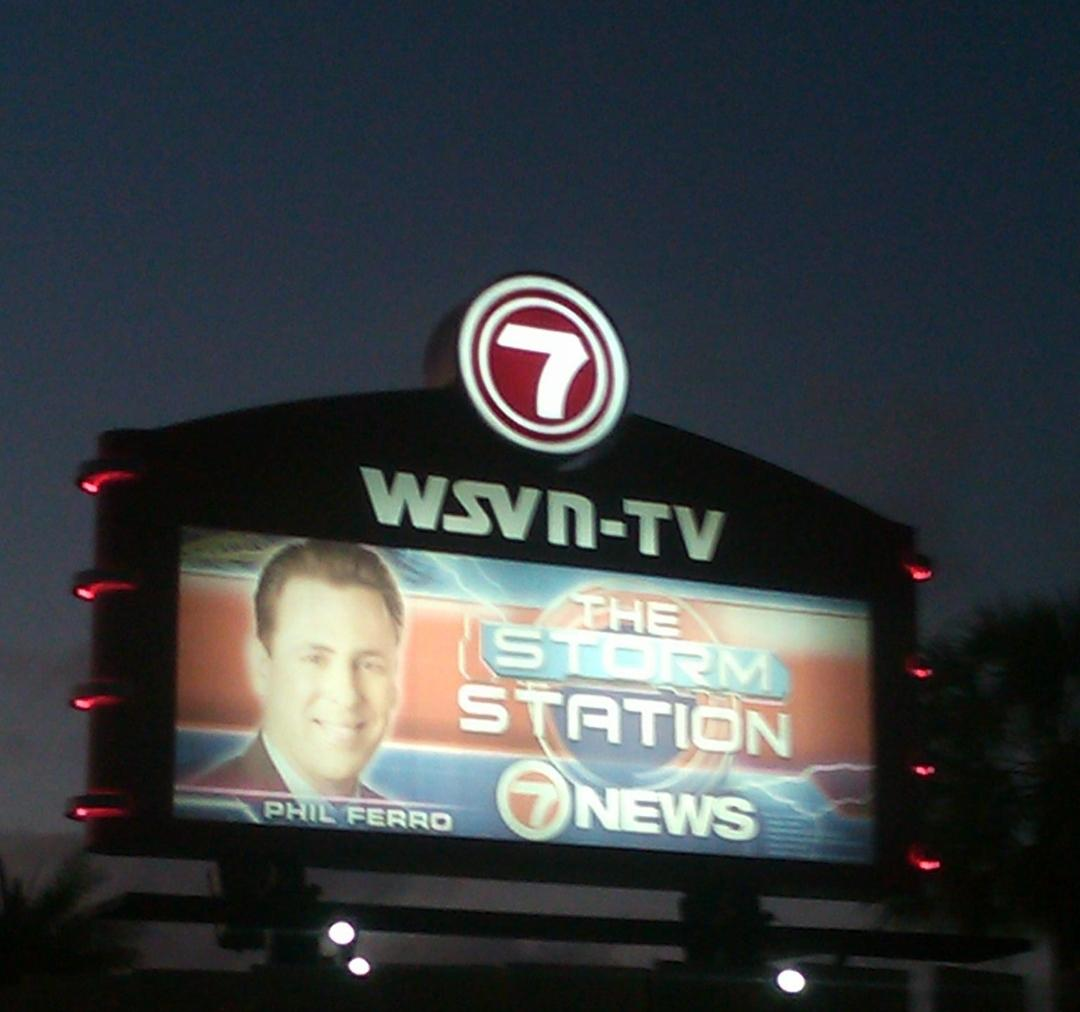
WSVN outdoor marquee promoting meteorologist Phil Ferro

7:30 was relaunched on January 8, 1996, as Deco Drive, a Miami-centric newsmagazine with Jessica Aguirre and Kelly Mitchell as hosts; WHDH also carried the program. Along with the relaunch came a significant influx of personnel: while 7:30 operated with a staff of five people, Deco Drive debuted with a staff of 28. WHDH canceled Deco after five months due to low ratings, but the program continues to air on WSVN into the present day. Deco initially met with moderate ratings in Miami but started to decline after several months, resulting in a format change that featured fast-paced reports mostly aggregated from WSVN's satellite feeds. Mitchell left the show in April 1996, followed by Aguirre in February 1997; Belkys Nerey replaced Aguirre as co-host. Lynn Martinez, who has co-hosted Deco Drive since the summer of 1996, continues in that role.

Rick Sanchez left WSVN in April 2001 for a role at MSNBC. His replacement was anchor-reporter Craig Stevens, who was paired with Nerey in August 2003 following the departure of Laurie Jennings. Stevens and Nerey continue to be the station's lead anchor team in the present day, praised for having a "dynamic" on-air chemistry between the two and strong knowledge of the region. Joining WSVN in 1994 as a reporter, Nerey became interested in TV news by watching Molly Turner's consumer reports on WPLG. The continuity has extended beyond the anchor desk: Steve Shapiro joined WSVN in 1997 as sports director and host of Sports Xtra on Sunday nights, duties he held until retiring at the end of 2020. Josh Moser was named as Shapiro's successor, a role he continues to hold. Since 1998, Patrick Fraser has hosted Help Me Howard, a consumer advocacy/legal advice segment with former Broward County public defender Howard Finkelstein; Finkelstein also serves as WSVN's legal analyst. Carmel Cafiero retired in July 2016 after a 43-year run at channel 7; her retirement was regarded as the end of an era given her journalistic background and longevity. Marilyn Mitzel was the station's health reporter from 1988 until 2005, when the station dismissed her. Mitzel subsequently filed an age discrimination lawsuit against WSVN, initially prevailing in court; the ruling was overturned on appeal.

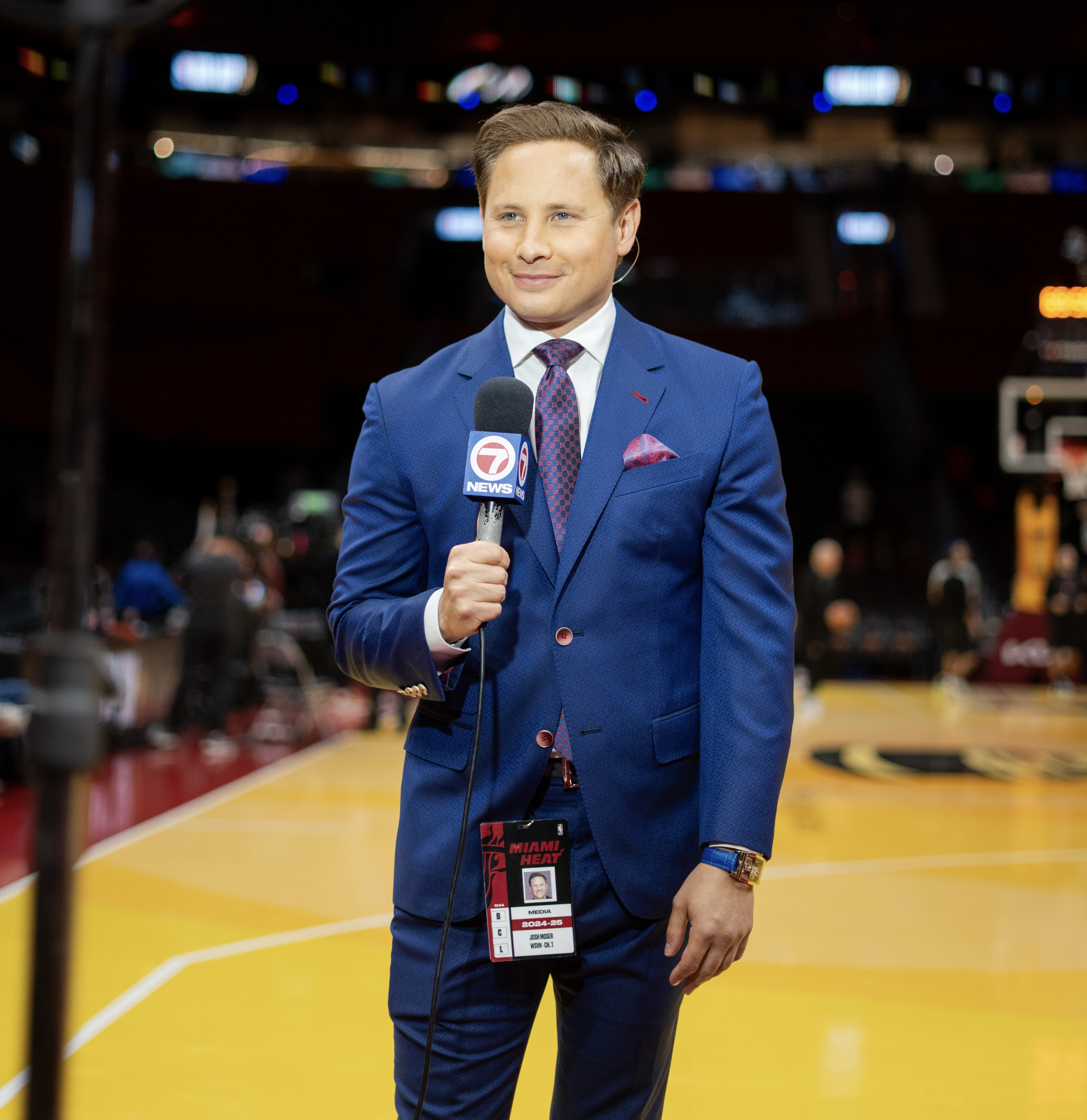
WSVN sports anchor Josh Moser in 2024

News production has steadily increased, including the debut of a daily 4 p.m. newscast in 2006, additional news on the weekends, and a 2011 expansion of Today in Florida to five hours. In March 2015, the "Newsplex" newsroom/newscast set was given a $500,000 upgrade to allow for more graphical elements to be displayed on-air. The newscast expansions and investment came against increased competition from the Internet and other technologies. Since 2010, viewership for all television stations in the Miami–Fort Lauderdale market, including WSVN, have declined per data from Nielsen Media, attributed to the growth of video on demand services and free ad-supported streaming television. In local news ratings for the first half of 2022, WSVN placed second in nearly every timeslot among Miami's English-language stations.

As of 2022, WSVN produced 68 hours of local news every week.

=== Digital and leadership transitions ===
WSVN activated its digital signal on September 1, 1999, and ended programming on its analog signal over VHF channel 7, on June 12, 2009, the official date on which full-power television stations in the United States transitioned from analog to digital broadcasts. The station's digital signal relocated from its pre-transition VHF channel 8 to channel 7. The station was one of four that operated digital signals on the VHF band to be granted a power increase later that month after stations experienced signal problems on VHF that did not occur with the UHF band following the transition. On September 27, 2017, three workers were killed after a gin pole supporting the scaffolding they were on collapsed off the side of WSVN's television tower. The tower, shared with WPLG, needed to have a new transmitter installed for WSVN as part of the mandated FCC spectrum repack. On December 4, 2023, WSVN began hosting ATSC 1.0 broadcasts for WPLG, which transitioned to ATSC 3.0 transmissions; WSVN's primary channel also broadcast over WPLG's ATSC 3.0 "lighthouse".

As part of Sinclair Broadcast Group's attempted 2017 purchase of WSFL-TV owner Tribune Broadcasting, Sinclair offered to resell WSFL to Fox Television Stations. Ansin affirmed WSVN would remain a Fox affiliate through June 2019 and "continue to be the news leader in South Florida" with or without Fox programming; Ansin also stated network executives had yet to meet with him over their plans for WSFL. Fox's purchase of WSFL was nullified after the FCC voted to have an administrative law judge review the Tribune-Sinclair deal, prompting Tribune to terminate it. On September 26, 2019, WSVN announced that it had renewed its Fox affiliation.

Edmund Ansin died on July 26, 2020, at the age of 84; his death was announced on WSVN that evening. Adam Jacobson of Radio & Television Business Report credited Ansin for having overseen what became a "legendary, revolutionary news-driven station". Ansin frequently dismissed the idea of retirement or selling off his stations: in a January 2020 interview with the Boston Globe, Ansin boasted, "I want to die with my boots on." As was Ansin's wish in 1987, Sunbeam Television was taken over by sons James and Andy Ansin. Ansin's death came one year after Bob Leider's death in June 2019 at age 75; Leider retired in 2014 (briefly returning from 2016 to 2017) and was remembered for his 43-year tenure with the station, his leadership during the 1989 affiliation switch, and extensive volunteer work in the community.

=== Future studios, reuniting the "Isle of Dreams" and linking with ABC ===
Sunbeam announced in 2023 that it would build a new facility for WSVN in Miramar, near Florida's Turnpike on the southeast corner of Red Road and Miramar Parkway. The site is in a business park owned by the company's real estate interests; completion was scheduled for 2026. The 71,000-square-foot (6,600 m^{2}) facility would contain two studios, allowing for commercial and other production to take place in parallel with live newscasts, and be centrally located in the region. It also would sit on elevated land and be designed to operate during a Category 5 hurricane, with backup air conditioning, two generators, and a fuel tank for station vehicles. The construction of the new WSVN facility is contingent on Miramar approving other development in the area to provide sufficient services for the station and other business park tenants. The primary reason for the move is to clear the North Bay Village land on which the station is located for high-density development.

As part of the redevelopment, Sunbeam purchased the other side of the island long used by WIOD radio in 2021 for $29 million. In 2002, Ed Ansin and WSVN staff raised concerns about the physical condition of the WIOD towers when rust from the tower directly facing the WSVN studio entrance fell, damaging a car. By 2003, WIOD's then-owner Clear Channel Communications sold their half of the island to "Isle of Dreams LLC", a developer that initially planned to build a 21-story high rise over the parcel then changed the plans in favor of a five-story strip club, both of which Ansin publicly campaigned against. After the strip club plans fell through in 2012, Sunbeam sued the developer to foreclose on a mortgage; the developer counter-sued in response. The WIOD towers were decommissioned and dismantled on February 8, 2024.

Sunbeam and ABC announced a multiyear affiliation deal on March 20, 2025, moving ABC to a WSVN subchannel and displacing WPLG in the role; the new service, branded "ABC Miami", launched on August 4, 2025. As a direct result, Sunbeam terminated the ATSC 3.0 arrangement with WPLG on July 28 so it could broadcast both Fox and ABC programming in high definition under the 1.0 format.

== Notable alumni ==
- Reed Cowan, anchor and reporter, 2007–2011
- Laurie Gelman, reporter, 1992–1994; known as Laurie Hibberd at WSVN
- Robb Hanrahan, anchor and reporter, 1993–1997
- Alycia Lane, reporter, 2000–2001
- Elita Loresca, weathercaster, 2004–2007
- Robin Meade, morning anchor, 1994–1995
- Chez Pazienza, writer and producer
- Charles Perez, weekend anchor, 2000–2004
- Jeff Pegues, reporter, 1997–2000
- Tomás Regalado, Latin American affairs editor, 1968
- Joy Reid, morning show writer, 1997
- Shaun Robinson, anchor and reporter, 1996–1999
- Linda Stouffer, reporter, 1994–1997; known on-air as Cinnamon Stouffer
- Michelle Tuzee, anchor, 1996–1997

== Subchannels ==
WSVN broadcasts from a transmitter in Miami Gardens, Florida. Its signal is multiplexed:

Subchannels of WSVN
Subchannel	Res.	Short name	Programming
7.1	720p	WSVN	Fox
7.2; 18.1	720p	ABC; ABC18.1	ABC
7.3	480i	The365	365BLK
7.4	480i	DEFY	Defy

WSVN's ABC subchannel is additionally simulcast on WDFL-LD (channel 18), a low-power station owned by Findal Media, and appears as channel 18 over area cable systems and on DirecTV.
