= WDFL-LD =

Television station in Miami

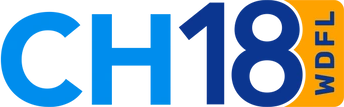

- Miami–Fort Lauderdale, Florida; United States
- City: Miami, Florida
- Channels: Digital: 11 (VHF); Virtual: 18
- Branding: Paradise TV 18.2 (18.2); ABC Miami Channels 18 & 7.2 (18.12)

Programming
- Affiliations: 18.2: Independent; 18.12: ABC (WSVN-DT2); for others, see § Subchannels

Ownership
- Owner: Findal Media & Technology Group, Inc.
- Operator: Sunbeam Television (18.12)
- Sister stations: WSVN

History
- First air date: January 20, 2010
- Former channel number: Virtual: 12 (2010–2014)
- Former affiliations: CNN Latino (2013–2014); Spanish-language independent (2014–2017); NewsNet (2020–2024); ULFN (2024–2025)
- Call sign meaning: Findal Florida (transposed meaning)

Technical information
- Licensing authority: FCC
- Facility ID: 168790
- ERP: 3 kW
- HAAT: 270.4 m (887 ft)
- Transmitter coordinates: 25°58′8″N 80°13′19″W

Links
- Public license information: LMS
- Website: abcmiami18.com (18.1); wdfltv.com (18.2)

WDFL-LD (channel 18) is a low-power television station in Miami, Florida, United States, owned by Findal Media & Technology Group, Inc. The station's transmitter is located in Andover, Florida. A subchannel of WDFL-LD relays the second subchannel of Sunbeam Television–owned WSVN (channel 7), which is affiliated with ABC.

== History ==
On June 17, 2013, it was announced that CNN Latino would be carried on the station beginning on August 19 of the same year. In February 2014, it was announced that CNN Latino would be ceasing operations; however, the station remained on the air with its programming and with more to be added.

The station later flipped to a Spanish independent format as "Mira TV" on March 7, 2014.

In June 2020, it was announced that NewsNet would affiliate with the station. In August 2024, due to NewsNet's shutdown, the station was replaced by Universal Living Faith Network (ULFN).

=== ABC affiliation (2025–present) ===
On March 20, 2025, then ABC affiliate WPLG announced its disaffiliation from the network, ending a nearly 64-year partnership, and its switch to an independent station status. On June 26, 2025, Sunbeam Television announced an agreement to begin simulcasting WSVN's new ABC-affiliated subchannel on WDFL-LD upon its launch on August 4, 2025. In alignment with this agreement, multiple television providers in the Miami market will also carry WSVN-DT2 on channel 18. The station began broadcasting ABC programming on August 4, 2025.

== Subchannels ==
The station's signal is multiplexed:

Subchannels of WDFL-LD
Subchannel	Res.	Short name	Programming
18.2	480i	WDFLTV	Independent "Paradise TV"
18.3	480p	ISLAND	Island TV (Haitian Creole)
18.4	480i	SHOP-LC	Shop LC
18.5	480i	SBN-TV	SonLife
18.6	480i	SPORTTV	Sports TV
18.7	480i	KINGDOM	Tele Anacaona
18.8	480i	FUNDAME	RTF (Haitian Creole)
18.9	480i	VSH-TV	Veterans Stone of Hope TV
18.10	480i	TelePam	Tele Pam (Haitian Creole)
18.11	480i	Caribe	TeveCaribe (Spanish)
18.12	480i	ABC	ABC (WSVN)

Simulcast of subchannels of another station

There is no 18.1 on the WDFL-LD multiplex, as it is broadcast from WSVN.
