= WBZ-TV =

Television station in Boston

- Boston, Massachusetts; United States
- Channels: Digital: 20 (UHF); Virtual: 4
- Branding: WBZ; WBZ News / CBS News Boston

Programming
- Affiliations: 4.1: CBS; for others, see § Subchannels

Ownership
- Owner: CBS News and Stations; (CBS Television Licenses LLC)
- Sister stations: WSBK-TV

History
- First air date: June 9, 1948
- Former channel numbers: Analog: 4 (VHF, 1948–2009); Digital: 30 (UHF, 1999–2019)
- Former affiliations: NBC (1948–1995); DuMont (secondary, 1948–1953)
- Call sign meaning: Taken from WBZ radio

Technical information
- Licensing authority: FCC
- Facility ID: 25456
- ERP: 922 kW; 1,000 kW (application)
- HAAT: 388.3 m (1,274 ft)
- Transmitter coordinates: 42°18′37″N 71°14′12″W

Links
- Public license information: Public file; LMS
- Website: www.cbsnews.com/boston/

WBZ-TV (channel 4) is a television station in Boston, Massachusetts, United States. It is owned and operated by the CBS television network via its CBS News and Stations division. Under common ownership with independent station WSBK-TV (channel 38), both stations share studio facilities on Soldiers Field Road in the Allston–Brighton section of Boston; WBZ-TV's transmitter is located on Cedar Street in Needham, Massachusetts, on a tower site that was formerly owned by CBS and is now owned by American Tower Corporation (which is shared with transmitters belonging to sister station WSBK as well as WCVB-TV, WBTS-CD and WGBX-TV).

== History ==
=== As an NBC affiliate (1948–1995) ===
Early logotype for WBZ-TV as seen on a station bumper, c. 1960.

As the only television station that was built from the ground up by the Westinghouse Electric Corporation, WBZ-TV began operations at 10 a.m. on June 9, 1948, with test patterns. The station's dedicatory program aired at 6:30 p.m. and featured remarks from the Very Rev. Edwin Van Etten, Archbishop Richard Cushing, Rabbi Joshua L. Liebman, Boston Mayor James Michael Curley, Boston Chamber of Commerce president C. Lawrence Muench, and Governor Robert F. Bradford. Due to the uncertainty surrounding the exact day the station would launch, all of the messages were prerecorded and one of the speakers (Liebman) had died before the program aired. The dedication was followed by the station's first news broadcast, hosted by Arch MacDonald.

The station was from its inception associated with the NBC television network, owing to WBZ radio (1030 AM)'s longtime affiliation with NBC's radio networks. At its sign-on, WBZ-TV became the first commercial television station to begin operations in the New England region. The station originally operated from inside the Hotel Bradford alongside its radio sister; its current home was not completed at the time, although master control and its self-supporting tower over the building were in use at sign-on. The WBZ stations would not move into what was then known as the Westinghouse Broadcasting Center until June 17, 1948, when the building was opened.

The station was knocked off the air on August 31, 1954, when Hurricane Carol destroyed its transmitter tower. A temporary transmitter was installed using a short, makeshift tower at the studio site and later on the original tower of WEEI-FM (now WBGB) in Malden. In 1957, WBZ-TV began broadcasting from a 1,200-foot (366 m) tower in Needham, along with WBZ-FM at 106.7 FM (now WMJX). The tower site is now owned by American Tower Corporation, and is used by several Boston-area television stations, including WGBH-TV (channel 2) and WCVB-TV (channel 5).

Channel 4 was in danger of losing its NBC affiliation when Westinghouse balked at NBC's initial offer to trade sister stations KYW radio and WPTZ television in Philadelphia, in exchange for WTAM-AM-FM and WNBK television in Cleveland. In response, NBC threatened to pull its programming from both WBZ-TV and WPTZ unless Westinghouse agreed to the trade. The swap was made in February 1956, and Westinghouse immediately complained to the Federal Communications Commission (FCC) and the U.S. Department of Justice about NBC's extortion. The threat reemerged in 1960 after NBC announced it would swap the Philadelphia stations in exchange for a competing Boston outlet, then-CBS affiliate WNAC-TV (channel 7, now defunct) and its sister radio stations, from RKO General. Approval of the RKO-NBC deal would have potentially made WBZ-TV an ABC affiliate, completing a three-way swap of network affiliations in Boston. However, in 1964, the FCC nullified the NBC-RKO trade and ordered the NBC-Westinghouse swap reversed without NBC realizing any profit on the deal. WBZ-TV retained its NBC affiliation as a result of the canceled sale.

WBZ-TV (sometimes informally referred to as "BZ" both on- and off-air) was a pioneer in Boston television. In 1948, it began live broadcasts of Boston's two Major League Baseball teams, the Red Sox and the Braves, broadcasts that at first were split with WNAC-TV. It was also the first Boston station to have daily newscasts, starting with the station's first night on the air. On October 12, 1957, WBZ-TV broadcast a half-hour special program on Sputnik 1, featuring a motion picture of the final stage of its rocket crossing the pre-dawn sky of Baltimore, shot by sister station WJZ-TV. The station was the first in the Boston market to employ a female reporter (Betty Adams), the first to employ a Black full-time reporter (Terry Carter), the first to have an all-female news team (Shelby Scott and Gail Harris), the first to have a Black full-time nightly news anchor (Liz Walker), and the first to air a minority affairs program.

=== Switch to CBS (1995–present) ===
In 1994, sister station WJZ-TV in Baltimore lost its affiliation with ABC after that network announced a deal with the E. W. Scripps Company to switch three of Scripps' television stations—including its Baltimore outlet, WMAR-TV—to ABC as a condition of retaining its network affiliations with WEWS-TV in Cleveland and WXYZ-TV in Detroit; CBS intended to affiliate with those two stations, as it was about to lose its longtime affiliates in those markets to Fox due to a deal with New World Communications. Westinghouse felt betrayed by ABC's decision, and as a safeguard began shopping for affiliation deals for the entire Group W television unit. Group W eventually struck an agreement to switch WBZ-TV, KYW-TV and WJZ-TV to CBS (Westinghouse's two other stations, KDKA-TV in Pittsburgh and KPIX in San Francisco, were already CBS affiliates). The Boston market's third network affiliation switch took place on January 2, 1995. The NBC affiliation went to the former CBS affiliate, WHDH-TV (channel 7). After a 47-year relationship with NBC, channel 4 became the third station in Boston to align with CBS. The network had originally affiliated with WNAC-TV in 1948, then moved to channel 5 (the original WHDH-TV) in 1961; it then returned to WNAC-TV (predecessor to the current WHDH) in 1972 and remained on channel 7 until the switch.

When Westinghouse merged with CBS outright on November 24, 1995, WBZ-TV became a CBS-owned-and-operated station. As a condition of the merger, CBS had to sell WPRI-TV (channel 12) in Providence, Rhode Island, which was acquired by CBS earlier that year. Channel 4 provides at least grade B signal coverage to all of Rhode Island, and city-grade coverage within Providence itself as well as Fall River and New Bedford. At the time, the FCC normally did not allow common ownership of two stations with overlapping signals, and would not even consider a waiver for stations with overlapping city-grade signals. In 1996, WBZ-TV became the first former Group W television station to drop the classic Group W font.

After the 2000 acquisition of CBS by its former subsidiary, Viacom, which effectively made the station locally owned because Viacom's parent National Amusements was based in the suburbs of Boston, WBZ-TV's operations were merged with that of Boston's UPN affiliate, WSBK-TV; concurrently, WBZ-TV also took over the operations of WLWC, the UPN affiliate in nearby Providence, which had been run out of WSBK-TV. Today, the operations of WBZ-TV and WSBK-TV are co-located at WBZ's studios in Brighton. WLWC was sold in 2006 to the Four Points Media Group, a holding company owned by private equity firm Cerberus Capital Management; it, along with the other Four Points stations, has since been acquired by Sinclair Broadcast Group (WLWC would subsequently be sold to OTA Broadcasting and Ion Media).

On February 2, 2017, CBS agreed to sell CBS Radio to Entercom, then the fourth-largest radio broadcaster in the United States, the sale was conducted using a Reverse Morris Trust so that it would be tax-free. While CBS shareholders retained a 72% ownership stake in the combined company, Entercom was the surviving entity, separating WBZ (AM) and its sister radio stations from WBZ-TV. The sale was completed on November 17, 2017; under the terms of a settlement with the Justice Department, WBZ (AM) was then divested to iHeartMedia.

== Logos and imaging ==
In the early 1960s, WBZ unveiled a new stylized "4" logo, using a distinctive font that had been designed especially for Group W. The logo became italicized in 1987, but remained the same font. It kept this logo for over 30 years until it unveiled its first "News 4 New England" logo in September 1996, a year and a half after the switch from NBC to CBS. The old logo was the longest-used numeric logo in New England television history until WCVB's stylized "5" crossed the 31-year mark in 2003.

The "Circle 4" logo that replaced the original "News 4" logo in 1998 was often referred to on-air by WBZ sports anchor Bob Lobel as "The Circle 4 Ranch". In 2004, WBZ began using CBS's standardized branding, becoming "CBS 4". In 2007, it dropped the standardized logo and reverted to being known as just "WBZ", using a new logo with WBZ lettering and the CBS eye contained within a series of squares. CBS would extend the logo design to then-sister radio station WBZ (1030 AM) in 2010. Alongside the introduction of a new set and the CBS O&O graphics package in 2011, WBZ introduced a logo combining the 2004 "CBS 4" logo with the squared WBZ lettering below it. However, the "squares" logo continued to be used as a secondary logo during the early 2010s, including certain promotions and on monitors in the station's news set.

On March 31, 2023, WBZ debuted the "CBS News" graphics and music package, following other CBS owned and operated stations. The morning newscast was the last time the "CBS 4/WBZ" logo was used to identify the station; for the afternoon newscasts, the "CBS News" graphics debuted, with WBZ call letters in a black box and the "CBS News Boston" logo beside it.

== Programming ==
=== Past programming preemptions and deferrals ===
As an NBC affiliate, the station was known to preempt several hours of network programming per day—a common practice among Group W television stations affiliated with NBC and CBS. This was significant, since WBZ-TV was NBC's third-largest affiliate, and second-largest in the Eastern Time Zone. It primarily preempted several of the network's morning programs, with most preempted programs appearing on independent stations in the area, including future sister station WSBK-TV and WQTV (now WBPX-TV). In addition, programs preempted by WBZ-TV could be seen on NBC's Providence affiliate WJAR, which provides a city-grade signal to the Boston area. In January 1983, when People Are Talking expanded to one hour, WBZ-TV dropped the NBC soap opera Another World, which moved first to WQTV, then to Worcester-based WHLL-TV (now WUTF-TV), and finally, in the early 1990s, Lawrence-licensed WMFP. The station also dropped some Saturday morning cartoons in 1990 (which also aired on WHLL), two years before NBC abandoned such programming in favor of a Saturday edition of the morning news show Today and live-action series aimed at teenagers such as Saved by the Bell.

NBC has traditionally been less tolerant of preemptions than the other networks and had to find alternate independent stations to air the various programs that WBZ-TV did not air. Despite this, NBC was generally satisfied with WBZ-TV, which was one of NBC's strongest affiliates. As a sidebar, Philadelphia sister station KYW-TV (NBC's largest affiliate at the time) also heavily preempted NBC programming, but it spent most of the 1980s and 1990s as NBC's weakest major-market affiliate.

=== Bob Emery and Boomtown ===
The station also broadcast many locally produced programs over the years. One of the most beloved was the long-running Big Brother Bob Emery show, hosted by veteran radio performer Bob Emery, who first did the show on Boston-area radio in 1921 and who in 1947 hosted the first five-times-a-week children's show on network television on DuMont. For nearly two decades, from 1956 to 1974, Rex Trailer hosted a popular weekend morning children's show called Boomtown. For part of that time, Boomtown originated from an outdoor "western town" set built next to WBZ-TV's studios. In 2005, WBZ aired a special documentary film directed by Michael Bavaro titled Rex Trailer's Boomtown featuring old clips and interviews with childhood fans such as Jay Leno, Steven Wright, Tom Bergeron and Jimmy Tingle. The broadcast master is now part of the permanent collection at the Museum of Television & Radio in New York City.

=== Evening Magazine ===
In April 1977, Evening Magazine premiered on the station. A weeknight magazine series that originated on San Francisco sister station KPIX-TV, it expanded to Group W's other stations in the late 1970s, before it began to be distributed to stations not owned by Westinghouse as PM Magazine. On WBZ, the original hosting teams were Robin Young and Marty Sender (1977–1980); Barry Nolan and Candace Hasey (1980–1981); and Nolan and Sara Edwards (1981–1982). Later, Edwards and Nolan became the longest running pair to host the program (1982–1989), before Jim Watkins replaced Nolan permanently in October 1989 (guests hosts had joined Edwards for a few months prior to Watkins' arrival). Evening enjoyed an over-13-year run, the last nine of which had it compete directly with WCVB's newsmagazine Chronicle. In September 1990, due to a decline in the franchise's popularity and tabloid TV magazines heralding bigger ratings and revenue, Group W canceled Evening/PM, with the last WBZ broadcast airing on December 17 of that year.

The program was originally replaced in the weeknight 7:30 slot by Family Feud from December 18, 1990, through mid-January 1991. With action in the Gulf War reaching a breaking point at that time, the station decided to begin airing expanded coverage of the war at 7:30 p.m. in an ongoing series titled Crisis in the Gulf: The 7:30 Report. Anchored by Jack Williams and Liz Walker, it served as a comprehensive update on the war until peace was called on February 27, 1991. Station management elected to keep the newscast going, but now as a newsmagazine that specialized in investigative reports. Subsequently with Randy Price as the principal anchor, the title was shortened to The 7:30 Report. The show continued on for another year and a half. Then, from September 1992 until September 2009, WBZ aired Entertainment Tonight—which it had acquired from WHDH-TV—at 7:30 p.m. (that show has been syndicated by CBS since 2006).

=== People Are Talking ===
People Are Talking began in 1978 and ran until 1991 on KPIX-TV with Ann Fraser and Ross MacGowan, first, as a locally produced morning talk show. The format was syndicated to other Group W stations during this period. WBZ-TV ran People Are Talking from 1980 to 1993, as a live early-afternoon talk show. Baltimore's version of the program was, at one time, co-hosted by Oprah Winfrey. In Boston, it was originally hosted by Nancy Merrill, later by Buzz Luttrell, but the program's last, Tom Bergeron, was the best-known host.

=== Miscellaneous ===
WBZ-TV carried The Oprah Winfrey Show during its first nationally syndicated year (1986–1987), airing the show weekdays at 9 am. Despite its overnight success, channel 4 had little interest in keeping the show as a part of its schedule, in part because the station had to give priority to the upcoming Group W-distributed talk show, The Wil Shriner Show, in the fall of 1987. Oprah moved to a 5 p.m. weekday time slot on WCVB-TV, where it became an institution (later moving to 4 p.m. in 1994) for the balance of its run, ending in 2011. In October 2009, WBZ-TV became the Boston outlet for the game shows Wheel of Fortune and Jeopardy! and moved The Insider and Entertainment Tonight to sister-station WSBK-TV. Previously, both aforementioned game shows aired on WSBK-TV since 2001, and on WHDH prior to then.

=== Lottery ===
WBZ-TV was a local television pioneer in lottery. It was the first station, in 1975, to air official lottery drawing results from the Massachusetts Lottery. During the station's 6 p.m. newscast, graphic slides featuring the Lottery and The Numbers Game logos would appear with the nightly results from the Boston and Tri-State (Maine, New Hampshire and Vermont) regions. This would continue in varied forms, usually as the newscast went to commercial break, for almost a decade.

In the spring of 1984, WBZ introduced local live lottery drawings. In response to the Mass Lottery's second major game, Megabuck$, WBZ, in conjunction, created Lottery Live, a series of live and hosted minute-long machine studio drawings. Done in the style of a game show format (albeit truncated), it was not only meant to let viewers see the process of lottery results, but to generate excitement and interest into the Lottery. Hosted by Evening Magazine contributor and 4 Today host Tom Bergeron, Lottery Live aired the daily Numbers Game following the last main segment of Evening at 7:55 p.m. weeknights. Twice a week, during the NBC prime time lineup at 9:58 p.m., the Megabuck$ drawings would air. Bergeron was known for wearing a tuxedo during Megabuck$ drawings that he nicknamed the "mega tux". The Numbers Game also aired Saturdays at 7:55 p.m. Beginning on May 1, 1987 (a few months before Lottery Live ended its original WBZ run), a new state sweepstakes, Mass Millions, was introduced, and was televised on Lottery Live each Friday. Substitute hosts during the original WBZ run of Lottery Live included Evening Magazine reporter Steve Aveson (later of New England Cable News) and WBZ radio personality Ron Robin.

The station holds the record for having the longest initial involvement with the Lottery (12 years), culminating in its decision to release the lottery rights to another station in 1987. Both WCVB and WNEV (present-day WHDH) were in the running for picking up the rights; in the end, the torch was passed to WNEV, who saw the acquisition as helping their station revenues and key ratings periods (that station's newscasts were continually in third place). Channel 7 continued the Lottery Live title and format with different hosts, upon its move on August 31, 1987. WNEV/WHDH aired Lottery Live for seven seasons, until new ownership terminated the contract, upon which WCVB had their turn to air the games (from 1994 to 1998).

Eleven years after leaving its original station, Lottery Live returned to WBZ on May 20, 1998, with longtime host Dawn Hayes (from the WNEV/WHDH era) still at the helm. By this time, in addition to The Numbers Game still airing six nights a week at 7:53 p.m., late-night airings (during the 11 p.m. newscast) drew Megabuck$, Mass Million$, Mass Ca$h (1991) and The Big Game (1996) on individual nights. Due to new limited contracts permitting the local stations to carry Lottery Live for only three years at a time, WBZ moved the games to sister station WSBK-TV in 2001.

=== Special events ===
From 2003 through 2016, WBZ produced coverage of the Boston Pops Orchestra's annual Fourth of July concert at the Hatch Memorial Shell. In the event's first decade on the station, the 10 p.m. ET hour of the show was broadcast nationally by CBS—featuring the Pops' signature performances of the "1812 Overture" and "Stars and Stripes Forever", as well as the fireworks over the Charles River. Live coverage of the event was broadcast in high-definition for the first time beginning in 2007.

CBS ended its national broadcast of the event following the 2012 concert; Boston Pops executive producer David G. Mugar believed CBS made this decision due to poor ratings, due primarily to NBC counterprogramming the Boston Pops' live broadcast with an encore broadcast of its competing Macy's 4th of July Fireworks special from New York City. In 2016 (which also marked Mugar's retirement), CBS resumed network coverage of the concert, airing the final two hours, with the entire concert continuing to air locally on WBZ.

On March 7, 2017, it was announced that the telecast would move to Bloomberg Television in 2017, as part of a new sponsorship deal between the Boston Pops, Eaton Vance, and Bloomberg L.P. The 2018 edition was simulcast by WHDH.

=== Sports ===
WBZ-TV has aired local sporting events over the years, that have originated either in-house, or through NBC or CBS. Besides the Braves (from 1948 until the team moved to Milwaukee before the 1953 season) and the Red Sox (1948–1957, 1972–1974, and a handful of games in 2003 and 2004, along with certain games aired nationally on NBC from 1948 to 1989), WBZ-TV also broadcast the Boston Celtics from 1972 to 1985 (and again from 1990 to 1994 through NBC's broadcast contract with the NBA).

In 1981, WBZ-TV was the first Boston television station to broadcast live wire-to-wire coverage of the Boston Marathon; the station continued to do so every year through 2022, and was the only Boston station to do so starting in 2007 (WCVB-TV and WHDH-TV also carried the race in its entirety during much of the 1980s, 1990s, and early 2000s). Marathon coverage would move to WCVB-TV in 2023.

The station has long been associated with the New England Patriots of the National Football League, an association that began in 1965 after NBC's acquisition of rights to the American Football League, of which the Patriots were a part of then. After WBZ's switch to CBS, Patriots regular season games would not air on the station again until 1998, when CBS acquired the television rights to the NFL's present AFC. Since then, the majority of Patriots regular season games have aired on WBZ, and in 2009, the station became the Patriots' "official" station, gaining rights to preseason games and airing the weekly program Patriots All Access. Three of the Patriots' Super Bowl appearances—XX, XXXVIII and LIII (including the team's wins in the latter two)—were televised by WBZ.

In April 2021, the station announced that WBZ-TV and its sister station WSBK-TV would air New England Revolution matches throughout the 2021 season; most matches were aired on WSBK, with select matches (including, in 2021, the season opener) airing on WBZ-TV. WBZ and WSBK lost the local rights to Revolution matches in 2023, when all MLS broadcasts shifted to MLS Season Pass, a new subscription service hosted on Apple TV.

=== News operation ===
Logo for the station's news operation and CBS News Boston

WBZ-TV presently broadcasts 33 1/2 hours of locally produced newscasts each week (with 4 hours, 35 minutes each weekday; 5 hours, 5 minutes on Saturdays; and 5 1/2 hours on Sundays). WBZ operates a Bell LongRanger 206LIV helicopter for newsgathering called "Sky Eye". WBZ produces a weeknight 8 p.m. newscast for sister station WSBK.

WBZ's newscasts currently place second to WCVB in Nielsen ratings in the competitive Boston market, although, on the whole, Channel 4 regularly ranks as Boston's most watched station.

In the mid-1960s, WBZ-TV adopted the Eyewitness News format that had been pioneered at Philadelphia sister station KYW-TV. WBZ was the first Boston station to have a regularly scheduled late afternoon news program. In the 1970s, the station aired First 4 News at 5:30 p.m., anchored initially by Jack Williams and Pat Mitchell, then by Gail Harris. On July 21, 1979, a new format premiered in this time slot: Live on 4, a more informal program mixing elements of a daytime talk show with those of a traditional newscast, went on to become a trendsetter in the Boston market in the 1980s. First anchored by Gail Harris and Chris Marrou, it later had hosting assumed by many other WBZ staff members, including entertainment reporter Joyce Kulhawik and news anchor Chris Conangla in the mid-1980s. Live on 4 gave a loose preview of the news to be covered more in depth at 6 p.m. and 11 p.m. with featuring stories on lifestyle, health and entertainment topics, along with live, in-studio guests.

At one point, WCVB considered launching a competing program that was similarly structured (to be anchored by Peter Mehegan and Mary Richardson, who later became the long-running anchor team on Chronicle), but it was WNEV who made three attempts at a Live on 4–inspired show. First, it premiered the two-hour live talk/magazine show Look in the fall of 1982 (renamed New England Afternoon in its second and final year), it failed in the Nielsen ratings and was canceled in 1984. Three years later, WNEV tried the even more news-oriented copy New England News: Live at Five, which essentially became Boston's first proper 5 p.m. newscast, although it still featured the informal structure of Live on 4. Although this competitor to Live on 4 drew high ratings, the format ended after only a year, due to the departure of its creator, anchor Dave Wright. From 1988 to 1991, WNEV (which became WHDH-TV in 1990) ran a 5 p.m. newscast with a regular hard-news format.

In the early 1980s, WBZ-TV lost its longtime spot as Boston's highest-rated news station to WCVB, but even then placed a strong second for more than a decade. Its evening news team—consisting of anchors Jack Williams and Liz Walker, the late meteorologist Bruce Schwoegler, and sportscaster Bob Lobel—was the longest-running news team in New England from 1981 until Walker moved to the noon newscast in 2000. Other personalities who came to channel 4 during this time were political reporter John Henning and Kulhawik. Williams remained at WBZ until his retirement in June 2015, Walker gave up anchoring duties in 2005 and hosted a Sunday morning talk show for several years before leaving the station in October 2008.

With syndicated news and tabloid programming becoming more the norm in the late 1980s and early 1990s, Live on 4, like Evening Magazine, was starting to become of lesser importance to Group W. In 1991, after a 12-year-run, Live on 4 was dropped after WBZ-TV acquired A Current Affair for the 5:30 p.m. time slot (the program previously aired on WFXT). WBZ launched a 5 p.m. newscast at that time. When A Current Affair moved to WCVB's late night schedule in the fall of 1993 (later moving to WHDH's daytime lineup in 1994), WBZ switched their late afternoon newscast to 5:30 p.m., and began airing the freshman syndicated series American Journal (with WBZ alumnus Nancy Glass as anchor) at its 5 p.m. lead-in. American Journal would itself move to WCVB starting in its second season.

During the 1994–95 season, WBZ dropped late afternoon news altogether, airing The Maury Povich Show at 5 p.m. instead. By the summer of 1995, the station's news had fallen to third place for the first time, thanks in part to WHDH and WCVB's full-hour 5 p.m. news accounting for their ratings dominance. In response, WBZ began airing two hours of news between 5 p.m. and 7 p.m. that fall, with the end time of the news block later being scaled back to 6:30 p.m. in 1997 (to accommodate the move of the CBS Evening News to 6:30 p.m., and the station picking up Extra for 7 p.m.). The 90-minute 5 p.m. news remained originally until June 2004, when WBZ launched a 4 p.m. newscast for the first time (to complete with WHDH's newscast in the same timeslot). The 4 p.m. newscast was an hour long; the 5 p.m. hour was then given to Dr. Phil, a scheduling prompted by a contractual prohibition on scheduling Dr. Phil directly against The Oprah Winfrey Show, as well as the success of a similar move by Philadelphia sister station KYW-TV.

Channel 4 changed its news and station branding continuously in the decade following the affiliation switch; after having changed from its longstanding brand of Eyewitness News to WBZ News 4 in 1993 (prior to the switch), the newscasts were rebranded to News 4 New England in 1996 and WBZ 4 News in 2000. On February 1, 2004, WBZ rebranded itself as "CBS 4", the move was officially made in an attempt to alleviate lingering confusion from the 1995 affiliation swap, though the branding brought the station in line with other CBS-owned stations. The "CBS 4" branding was phased out during the first quarter of 2007 and in February 2007, the station's newscast title was reverted from CBS 4 News to WBZ News. The rebranding was completed on February 4, 2007, during the station's coverage of the Super Bowl. This made WBZ-TV the first station owned by CBS to depart from CBS's standardization, and one of a handful of CBS-owned stations to brand with its call letters rather than the CBS name. General manager Ed Piette told The Boston Globe that he decided to ditch the "CBS 4" branding when he arrived in Boston for his first day of work and a cabbie asked him, "Whatever happened to WBZ?" The move was done in the hopes of re-emphasizing WBZ-TV's local identity and trading on the call letters' then eight-decade history in Boston—a strategy that worked well when Piette was general manager at Minneapolis–Saint Paul sister station WCCO-TV. The logo that was used for the "CBS 4" branding returned to the station in December 2011, but the station still brands with its call letters to this day.

In January 2006, attempting to bolster its local news ratings, WBZ reinstated its 5 p.m. news (with Dr. Phil moving back to 3 p.m.) as part of a "mega-block" of news, and dismissed its former lead anchor Josh Binswanger, leading to the return of longtime anchor Jack Williams to the evening newscasts. In addition, Ed Carroll's contract was not renewed and in October 2005 the station hired Ken Barlow from KARE in Minneapolis, Minnesota, to replace him as chief meteorologist. The 4 p.m. newscast was discontinued later in 2006.

In late August 2006, WBZ-TV hired anchor Chris May from WHDH-TV, pairing him with Sara Underwood as anchors of the station's weekday 5 p.m. newscast. May subsequently moved to Philadelphia sister station KYW-TV, where he would remain until 2015. Underwood's contract with the station was not renewed and she left the station on March 4, 2008. In January 2007, the station launched Project Mass, a commitment to cover the community's top concerns in government, transit, healthcare, education, finance and the environment. The initiative kicked off with an online town meeting. WBZ's on-air staff continued to change in late 2007, when longtime morning anchor Scott Wahle was reassigned and replaced by former WFXT anchor David Wade. In January 2008, longtime morning and midday meteorologist Barry Burbank was reassigned to the weekend programs. He was replaced by meteorologist Todd Gutner. On February 29, 2008, it was reported that the 2007-2008 Writers Guild of America strike caused a significant loss in viewers during the late news. WBZ-TV finished with an average of 157,800 total viewers, down from 177,800 viewers in 2007.

On April 1, 2008, CBS's owned-and-operated television stations division ordered widespread budget cuts and staff layoffs from its stations. As a result of the budget cuts, roughly 30 staffers were released from WBZ-TV and WSBK-TV, including longtime sports director Bob Lobel, entertainment reporter Joyce Kulhawik, and WSBK anchor Scott Wahle. Lobel left channel 4 on May 16, 2008, while Kulhawik and Wahle left on May 29, 2008, and May 30, 2008, respectively. Steve Burton would become the new sports director, while the position that Kulhawik held was eliminated. Jack Williams filled in for the 9 p.m. spot in the interim. On June 6, 2008, weekend anchor/reporter Kate Merrill was appointed as 9 p.m. anchor on WSBK, along with general assignment reporting duties for the weekday 5 p.m. and 6 p.m. newscasts. Lobel subsequently served as a guest co-host on then-sister station WODS' morning show in late 2008 and a guest sports anchor on WBZ radio in January 2009. Even with the budget cuts at CBS, WBZ-TV's 11 p.m. newscast was number one in its time slot in the 2007–08 season (it has since slipped back to second place).

On September 15, 2008, the station was in the process of upgrading its news set for high definition broadcasts. During that time, all newscasts originated from the on-air area of the newsroom. The renovations lasted for at least six weeks. On December 11, 2008, WBZ and sister station WSBK-TV respectively became the fourth and fifth stations in the Boston market (behind WCVB, WHDH and WLVI) to begin broadcasting its newscasts in high definition. On May 19, 2009, WBZ/WSBK and Fox-owned WFXT entered into a Local News Service agreement that allows the stations to share local news video, along with a helicopter for traffic reports and breaking news. The helicopter originally used as part of the sharing agreement (which WFXT and WBZ/WSBK stopped using in 2013) was later involved in a crash that killed two people in Seattle on March 18, 2014, while on loan by Helicopters, Inc. for use by KOMO-TV during technical upgrades to that station's own helicopter.

On December 12, 2011, WBZ debuted a new news set, replacing one that had been used for nearly a decade, it features LED lighting, a dedicated weather area, and 16 high definition monitors. The new look, plus a greater emphasis on "hard news" coverage, are changes which the station believed would help regain viewership it had lost to rival station WCVB. Susan Walker, a broadcast professor at the Boston University, criticized the station's concurrent adoption of a standard graphics and branding scheme similar to its sister stations, which she believed put too much emphasis on WBZ being a CBS station, rather than branding itself as a local station.

WBZ-TV launched a streaming news service, CBSN Boston (now CBS News Boston) on September 24, 2019, as part of a rollout of similar services (each localized versions of the national CBSN service) across the CBS-owned stations.

==== Notable current on-air staff ====
- Ed Davis – security analyst

==== Sports on-air team ====
- Steve Burton – sports director
- Levan Reid – sports anchor/reporter
- Dan Roche – sports anchor/reporter

==== Notable former on-air staff ====
- Sharyn Alfonsi – news anchor/reporter (2000–2003)
- Charles Austin – news reporter (1968–2000); one of the first African-Americans to appear on local news in Boston
- Suzanne Bates – news anchor/reporter (1987–2000)
- Sue Bennett – hostess of musical variety show in the early 1950s
- Tom Bergeron – host of People Are Talking, Lottery Live, 4 Today, Rap-Around (1980s and 1990s)
- Len Berman – sports anchor and play-by-play of Boston Celtics games (1974–1978)
- David Brudnoy – commentator
- Gino Cappelletti – (1934–2022) sports anchor/reporter
- Terry Carter – (1965–1968) first African-American TV reporter in Boston
- Virginia Cha – news anchor
- Ken Coleman – (1972–1974) play-by-play of Boston Red Sox telecasts
- Alice Cook – sports anchor/reporter
- Sara Edwards – co-host of Evening Magazine (1980–1990)
- Tom Ellis – (1968–1975) news anchor
- Dick Flavin – reporter/commentator
- Gayle Gardner – sports reporter from 1976 to 1978
- Nancy Glass – Evening Magazine tipster
- John Henning – (1982–2003) news anchor/commentator
- Don Kent – (1955–1983) meteorologist
- Joyce Kulhawik – "Evening Magazine" tipster and producer; arts and entertainment reporter from 1978 to 2008
- Bob Lobel – sports anchor from 1981 to 2008
- Chris Marrou – Live on 4 news anchor from 1980 to 1981
- Mish Michaels – (1968–2022) meteorologist from 2001 to 2009
- Pat Mitchell – talk show host from 1971 to 1977
- Sean Mooney – news anchor
- Bob Neumeier – (1950–2021) sports anchor/reporter from 1981 to 2000
- Barry Nolan – co-host of Evening Magazine from 1980 to 1990
- Uma Pemmaraju – Evening Magazine tipster and news reporter
- Tony Pepper – anchor during the late 1970s and early 1980s; died 2018
- Johnny Pesky – (1919–2012) analyst for Boston Red Sox telecasts from 1972 to 1974
- Dan Rea – news reporter from 1976 to 2007
- Gil Santos – (1938–2018) play-by-play announcer of the Boston Celtics and the New England Patriots
- Shelby Scott – (1936–2022) news anchor and reporter from 1965 to 1996
- Sarah-Ann Shaw – first female African-American TV reporter in Boston (1969–2000)
- Bob Starr – (1933–1998) sports anchor
- Dick Stockton – sports anchor and play-by-play of Boston Celtics games (1972–1973 and 1974–75)
- Rex Trailer – (1928–2013) host of children's series Boomtown
- Roger Twibell – sports anchor and play-by-play of Boston Celtics' games (1978–1981)
- Liz Walker – anchor and talk show host (1981–2015)
- Jim Watkins
- Jack White – (1942–2005) news reporter
- Jack Williams – news anchor, and host of "Wednesday's Child" (1975–2015)
- Bob Wilson – (1929–2015) postgame host of Boston Red Sox telecasts (1972–74)
- Robin Young – co-host, Evening Magazine (1977–1980)

== Technical information ==
=== Subchannels ===
The station's signal is multiplexed:

Subchannels of WBZ-TV
Subchannel	Res.	Short name	Programming
4.1	1080i	WBZ-DT	CBS
4.2	480i	WBZ 4.2	Start TV
4.3	480i	WBZ 4.3	Dabl
4.4	480i	WBZ 4.4	Outlaw
4.5	480i	WBZ 4.5	Catchy Comedy

The CBS subchannel is offered in ATSC 3.0 (NextGen TV) format from the transmitter of WUNI.

=== Analog-to-digital conversion ===
WBZ-TV ended regular programming on its analog signal, over VHF channel 4, on June 12, 2009, the official date on which full-power television stations in the United States transitioned from analog to digital broadcasts under federal mandate. The station's digital signal continued to broadcast on its pre-transition UHF channel 30, using virtual channel 4.

As part of the SAFER Act, WBZ temporarily kept its analog channel on the air until July 12 to broadcast information regarding the transition to digital television.

In 2015, CBS and Weigel Broadcasting's Decades network was added to 4.2 upon its launch.

== See also ==
- List of television stations in Massachusetts
- Channel 4 virtual TV stations in the United States
- Channel 20 digital TV stations in the United States
- List of United States stations available in Canada
- List of New England Patriots broadcasters
- List of three-letter broadcast call signs in the United States
