= SAG-AFTRA =

American media labor union

- Screen Actors Guild–American Federation of Television and Radio Artists
- Founded: March 30, 2012; 14 years ago
- Merger of: Screen Actors Guild; American Federation of Television and Radio Artists
- Type: Trade union
- Tax ID no.: 45-4931719
- Legal status: 501(c)(5) organization
- Headquarters: Los Angeles, California, US
- Location: United States
- Members: 171,157 (active; 2022); 80,440 (other; withdrawn/suspended; 2014)
- President: Sean Astin
- Executive director: Duncan Crabtree-Ireland
- Affiliations: AFL–CIO; Associated Actors and Artistes of America; International Federation of Actors; International Federation of Journalists
- Staff: 664 (2018)
- Website: sagaftra.org

The Screen Actors Guild–American Federation of Television and Radio Artists (SAG-AFTRA, /sæɡˈæftrə/) is an American labor union formed in 2012 by the merger of the Screen Actors Guild and the American Federation of Television and Radio Artists. It represents approximately 170,000 media professionals worldwide. SAG-AFTRA is a member of the AFL-CIO, the largest federation of unions in the United States. SAG-AFTRA is also a member of the International Federation of Actors.

== History ==
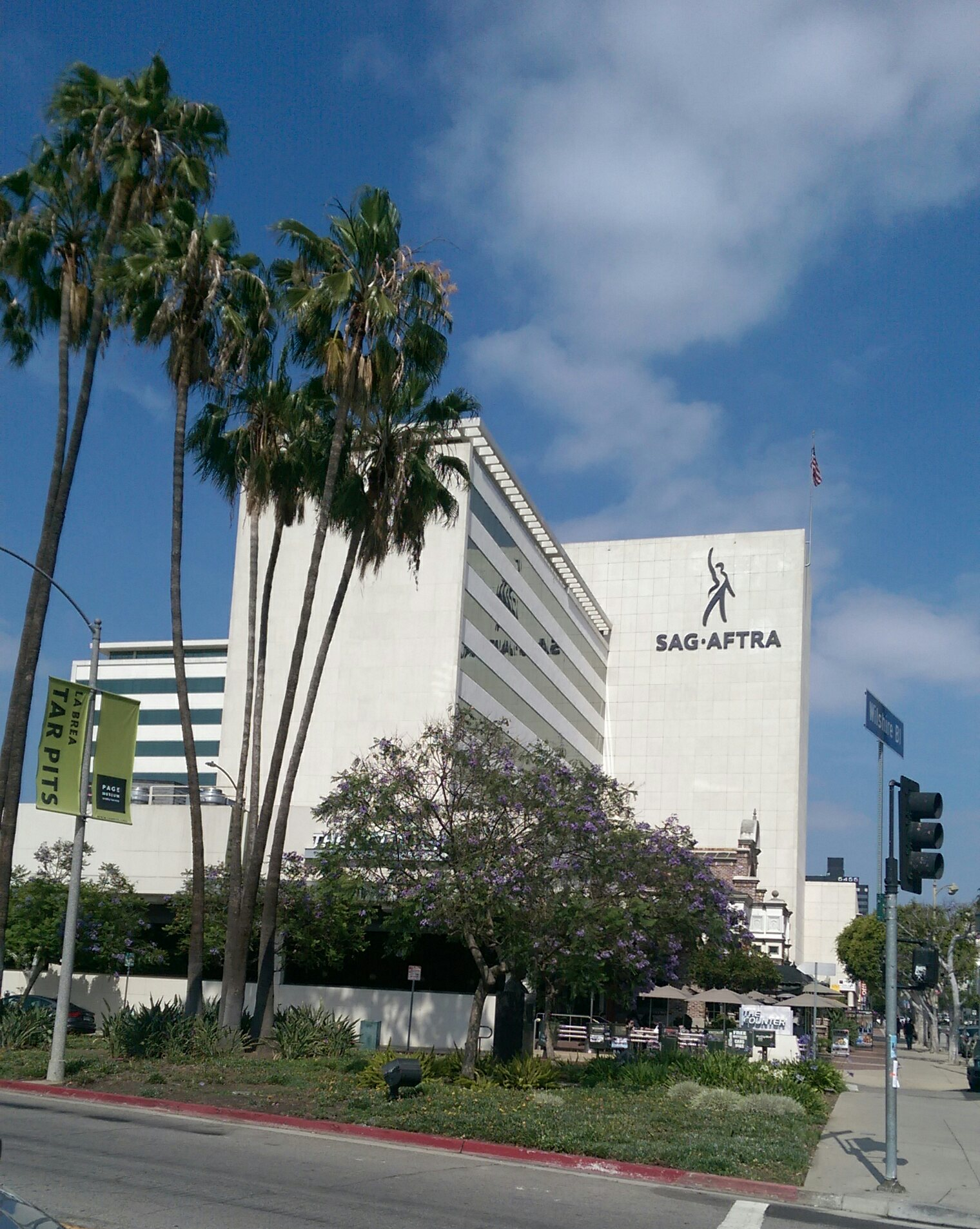
SAG-AFTRA Plaza in Los Angeles, California, headquarters to SAG-AFTRA

=== Background ===
The organization was formed on March 30, 2012, following the merger of the Screen Actors Guild and the American Federation of Television and Radio Artists. In January 2013, Variety reported that the merger had proceeded with "few bumps", amid shows of good will on both sides. The one remaining issue was reported to be the merger of the two pension funds, in part as a way of dealing with the issue of performers who paid into each plan but did not quite earn enough under either of the old plans to qualify for a pension.

SAG-AFTRA is headquartered in Los Angeles, California, and in New York City, in addition to other local offices nationwide.

=== Actor Awards ===
The Actor Awards is an awards ceremony founded in 1995 (as the Screen Actors Guild Awards) to recognize outstanding performances in movie and primetime television. It has been one of the major awards events in the Hollywood film industry since then, along with the Golden Globe Awards and the Academy Awards. The awards focus both on individual performances and on the work of the entire ensemble of a drama series and comedy series, and the cast of a motion picture.

=== SAG-AFTRA producers pension and health plans ===
The 2012 merger of SAG and AFTRA was followed by the joining of each former union's health care and pension plans. The Plans are administered by trustees representing the industry, as well as performers. In 2024, a proposed class action lawsuit was filed in the United States District Court for the Central District of California against the SAG-AFTRA Health Plan for negligence, subsequent to a cyberattack resulting in a data breach. The suit resulted in a settlement by the union and its members in August 2025.

== Composition ==
SAG-AFTRA has a diverse membership consisting of actors, announcers, broadcast journalists, dancers, disc jockeys, news writers, news editors, program hosts, puppeteers, recording artists, singers, stunt performers, voice-over artists, and other media professionals.

Membership in SAG-AFTRA is considered a rite of passage for new performers and media professionals. It is often procured after getting hired for their first job in a studio that has a collective bargaining agreement with the union. SAG-AFTRA work is considered to be substantially more prestigious than non-union jobs. Due to the size and influence of the union, most major media firms have a collective bargaining agreement with SAG-AFTRA through the Alliance of Motion Picture and Television Producers. Studios that have signed a collective bargaining agreement with SAG-AFTRA are not closed shops but are generally required to give preference to union members when hiring.

Nearly all professional actors working for medium or large-scale American media firms are union members. According to SAG-AFTRA's Department of Labor records since its founding, around a third of the union's total membership has consistently been considered "withdrawn", "suspended", or otherwise not categorized as "active" members. These members are ineligible to vote in the union. In April 2014, "Honorable withdrawals" constituted the largest portion of these, at 20% of the total membership, or 46,934 members; "suspended payment" members were the second-largest, at 14%, or 33,422 members, with the merged union using a classification scheme carried over from the Screen Actors Guild, rather than the one previously used by AFTRA.

== Factions ==
The union is perceived as having two factions. The larger faction ("United for Strength") says it is focused on creating job opportunities for members. A second faction ("Membership First") has criticized the current administration for being too quick and soft when it comes to negotiations with studios. The two factions joined to create a unity slate and endorse the re-election of Fran Drescher as the union's president in 2023. The unity slate called "The Coalition" elected Sean Astin as president in 2025.

== Major strikes and boycotts ==
=== Global Rule One ===
Global Rule One states: "No member shall render any services or make an agreement to perform services for any employer who has not executed a basic minimum agreement with the union, which is in full force and effect, in any jurisdiction in which there is a SAG-AFTRA national collective bargaining agreement in place. This provision applies worldwide."

Simply put, a SAG-AFTRA member must always work under a union contract around the globe.

"Do not work" orders are formally issued to denote productions that have not entered into the required agreements.

=== 2016–2017 strike ===
After approximately a year and a half of negotiations, SAG-AFTRA issued a strike on October 21, 2016, against eleven American video game developers and publishers, including Activision, Electronic Arts, Insomniac Games, Take 2 Interactive, and WB Games. The strike resulted from attempted negotiations since February 2015 to replace the previous contract, the Interactive Media Agreement, that expired in late 2014. There were four major issues they fought for with this strike: establishing transparency in contract negotiation; preventing vocal stress from long recording sessions; providing safety assurances for stunt coordinators on performance capture sets; and giving payments of residuals based on sales of a video game, which have traditionally not been used in the video game industry. SAG-AFTRA members sought to bring equity for video game actors as in other industries, while the video game companies feared that giving residuals to actors would overshadow the contributions of programmers and artists that contribute to the games. It was the first such organized strike within the video game industry and the first voice actors' strike in 17 years, as well as the first strike within the merged SAG-AFTRA organization. As of April 23, 2017, it became the longest strike within SAG, surpassing the 95-day 1980 Emmy Awards strike, and the 2000 commercials strike.

An agreement was reached on September 23, 2017, ending the 340-day strike.

=== Strike against Bartle Bogle Hegarty ===
On September 20, 2018, SAG-AFTRA called a strike against global advertising agency Bartle Bogle Hegarty (BBH) after the company announced they would no longer honor a long-standing contract with SAG-AFTRA. SAG-AFTRA launched a successful strike action that drew thousands of members to picket lines and strike actions across the country. At the close of the strike, BBH agreed to return to SAG-AFTRA's contract.

In 2018, BBH had withdrawn from their contract with SAG-AFTRA, which was first agreed on in 1999, over contractual terms that stated BBH would not be allowed to hire non-union actors. BBH stated it put them at a competitive disadvantage as many of their peer agencies were not signatories.

SAG-AFTRA members' successful strike actions, including pickets and rallies throughout the US, proved a success for SAG-AFTRA. Several actions of note included a rally of 1,000 SAG-AFTRA members and supporters near SAG-AFTRA Headquarters at the La Brea Tar Pits, and a picket line at BBH Headquarters in Los Angeles that drew an estimated 1,000 members standing in solidarity on the picket line.

On July 20, 2019, SAG ended its 10-month strike against BBH after the advertising agency agreed to sign the union's new commercials contract.

=== 2023 strike ===
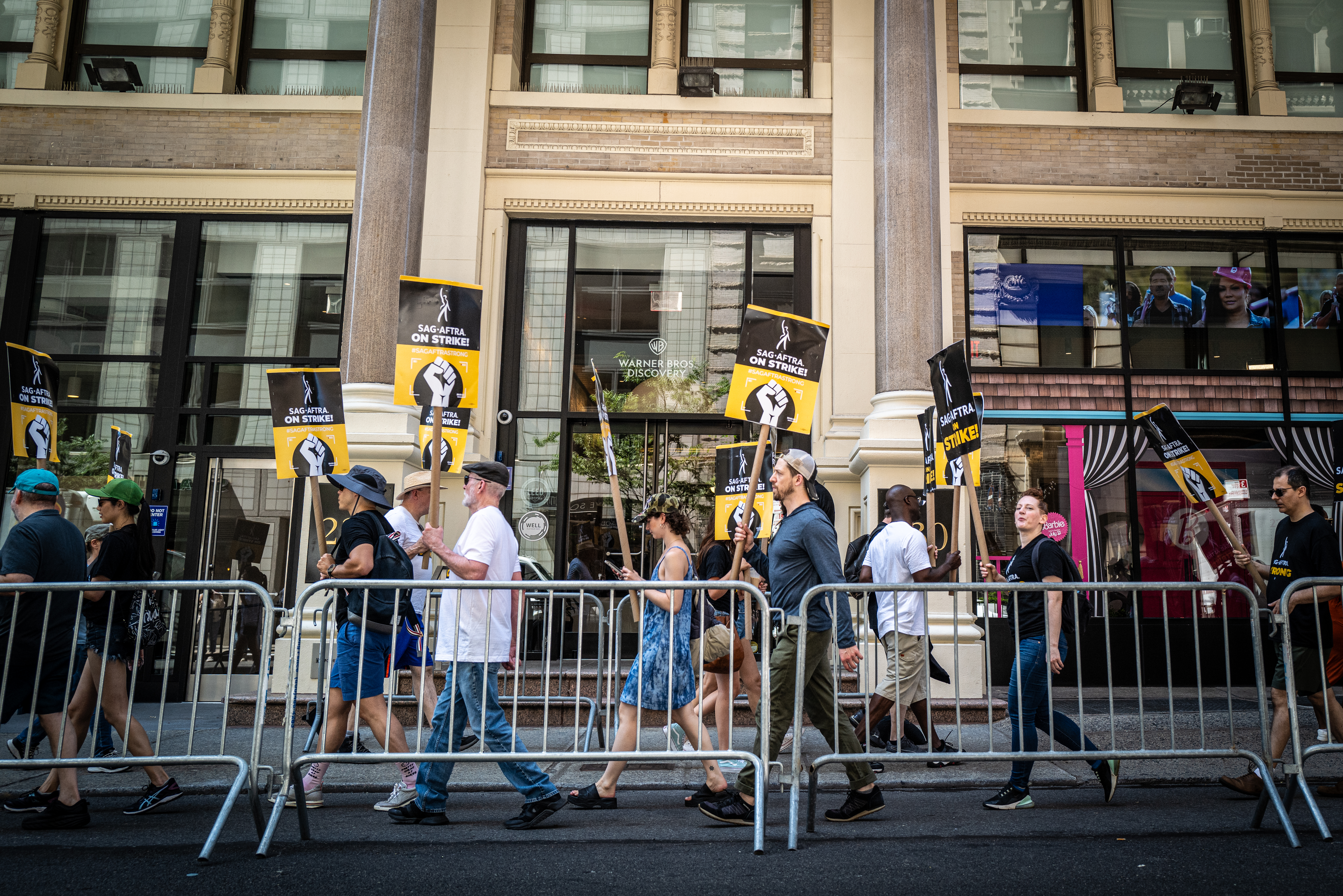
Picketers outside of the Warner Bros. Discovery offices in New York City during the 2023 SAG-AFTRA strike

In June 2023, the guild voted to authorize a strike if its negotiating committee failed to reach an agreement on a new contract with major Hollywood studios by June 30. On June 27, over 300 actors signed a letter threatening to go on strike. Signatories include Jennifer Lawrence, Meryl Streep, Rami Malek and Amy Schumer. The next day, signatories had reached 1,000 members. Key issues in the negotiations include issuing residuals based on viewership data and finding a uniform metric on which to judge all streaming platform data. Further issues include limiting the use of self-tape auditions and preventing the use of artificial intelligence and computer generated voices and faces within the entertainment industry. On July 10, 2023, SAG-AFTRA laid out potential strike rules including: no shoots, no press, and no social media promos for any actors or actresses under the guild. A representative of the Alliance of Motion Picture and Television Producers spoke about the compensation offered to actors to avoid a strike. The alliance, which negotiated with the union on behalf of Netflix, Disney, and Warner Bros. stated that SAG-AFTRA deliberately distorts the course of negotiations. The deal, which SAG-AFTRA refused on July 12, included more than $1 billion for an increase in salaries, pensions and health insurance, was designed for a three-year period and included the protection of actors from the use of their images by artificial intelligence.

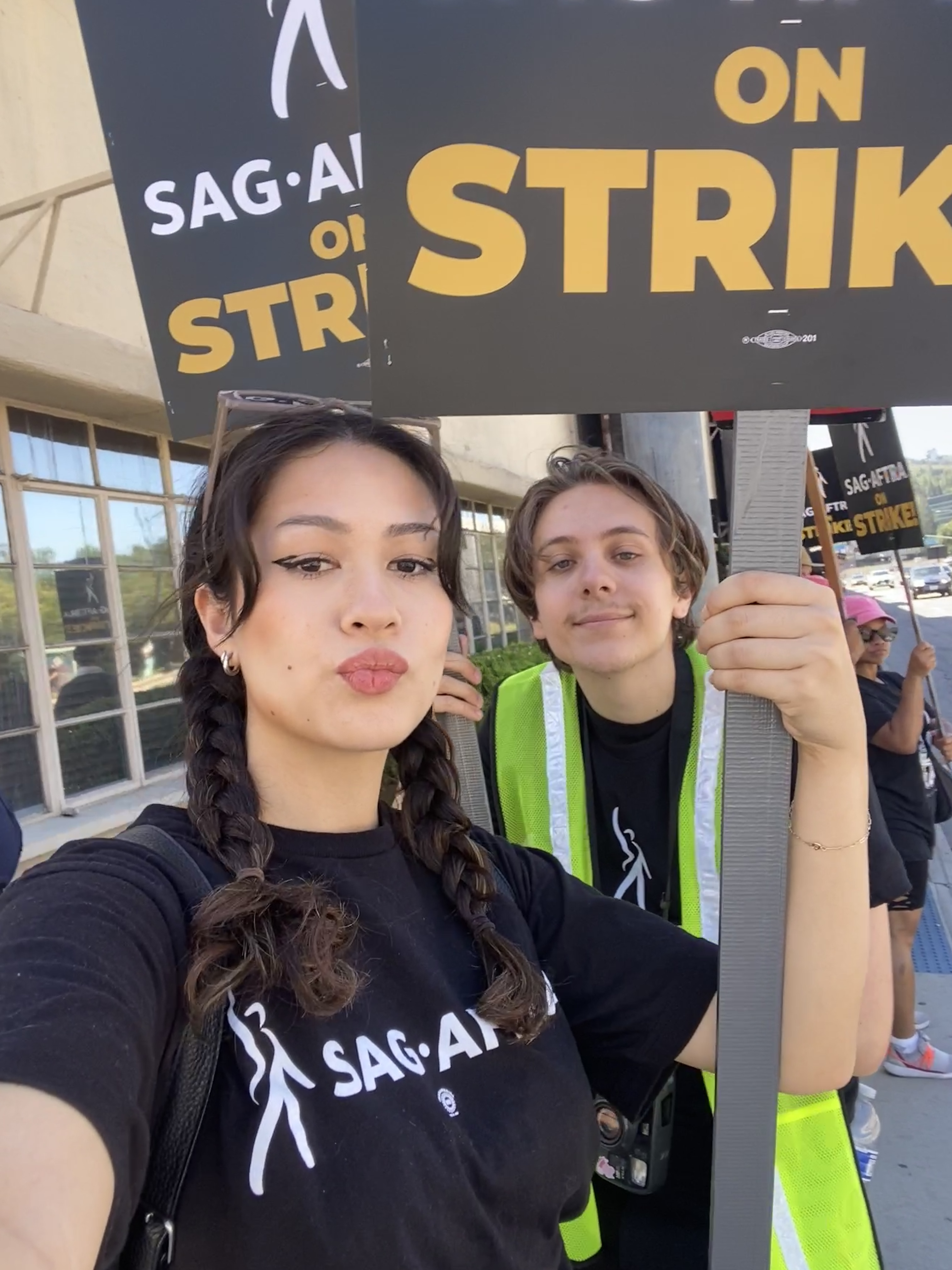
Two SAG-AFTRA members striking outside of Warner Bros. Studios Burbank

On July 13, SAG-AFTRA announced that its television, theatrical, and streaming contract with the alliance had expired without an agreement to replace it. They announced that the SAG-AFTRA negotiating committee had voted unanimously to strike. SAG-AFTRA also announced that their National Board would meet later that morning to decide on whether or not SAG-AFTRA would go on strike. SAG-AFTRA said they would make their decision known to the public at 12 p.m. PST in a press conference at SAG-AFTRA plaza in Los Angeles. During the press conference, SAG-AFTRA president Fran Drescher and national executive director and chief negotiator Duncan Crabtree-Ireland confirmed that members had voted to strike and that the strike would begin July 14. This marked the first strike that involved actors in the film and television industry since 1980, and also the first time since 1960 that both SAG-AFTRA and the WGA would strike at the same time. The strike would last for almost four months, eventually coming to an end on November 9, 2023. The deal received 78.33% approval among voting SAG-AFTRA members when the voting concluded on December 5.

=== 2024–2025 strike ===
The 2024–2025 SAG-AFTRA video game strike started after a year and a half of negotiations which failed to result in a protection agreement from the use of artificial intelligence (AI) for all performers covered by the Interactive Media Agreement. In addition to video game performers, there were concerns about companies having the ability to train AI to replicate an actor's voice or create a digital replica of their likeness without consent or fair compensation.

Starting 12:01 am PDT (UTC-7) on July 26, 2024, SAG-AFTRA began a labor strike against video game developers signed to the Interactive Media Agreement. Roughly 2,600 people who were employed in the video game industry for voice acting, motion capture, and other work would participate in the strike. On June 11, 2025, 12:30 pm (UTC-7) SAG-AFTRA suspended the strike. SAG-AFTRA members were given notice to return to work on productions that fall under the IMA. On July 9, 2025, the tentative agreement was ratified with 95.04% of the votes in favor, officially ending the strike.

== Organizing campaigns ==
=== Telemundo ===
On February 9, 2016, NBCUniversal, Telemundo's parent company, faced claims by SAG-AFTRA of operating under a double standard between its Spanish-language and English-language talent at NBC and Telemundo. In its response, the network released a statement claiming it is "committed to making Telemundo a great place to work for our employees and will continue to invest in them to ensure their salaries and working conditions are competitive with the rest of the broadcasting industry in accordance with market size and station revenues."

A few days later on February 13, 2016, SAG-AFTRA came back and added that Telemundo had been treating its employees like "second-class professionals" given that many actors do not receive basic workplace guarantees that SAG-AFTRA contracts provide, such as fair pay, water breaks, health insurance and residuals. At that time, Telemundo president Luis Silberwasser responded by saying that SAG-AFTRA asked for recognition of the union as the bargaining agent for employees — rather than seeking a vote by employees. However, SAG-AFTRA claimed that intimidation tactics had been taking place within the network to keep employees from unionizing and that they believe "there is no such thing as a 'fair vote' when workers are afraid for their careers and livelihoods, and live with the fear of retaliation if they are seen as actively wanting to unionize. SAG-AFTRA wants to ensure full protection for workplace democracy and performers' rights to choose through a truly fair process."

In August 2016, Telemundo once again found itself up against the union when the network refused to air an ad placed by SAG-AFTRA detailing the unfair wage gap and lack of benefits Telemundo employees face as opposed to unionized performers at NBCUniversal. The ad was set to air during the network's premiere people's choice awards Premios Tu Mundo but was never placed into rotation. A Telemundo spokesperson responded saying, "After legal review, we have concluded the ad did not pass legal standards for issue-based advertisement." Meanwhile, other Spanish-language networks such as MegaTV and Estrella TV aired the ad nationwide.

SAG-AFTRA continued to stand its ground, stating that "Telemundo's decision to censor 30 seconds of truthful commentary about its working conditions shows just how averse it is to having a transparent discussion about its refusal to fairly compensate Spanish-speaking performers."

In March 2016, the National Labor Relations Board administered a secret vote amongst 124 Telemundo performers, based on the amount of time actors had worked on telenovelas and other shows. SAG-AFTRA announced that 81% of eligible voters chose to unionize in a balloting process that began Feb 7 and lasted four weeks.

On July 12, 2018, SAG-AFTRA announced it had reached a first-ever tentative agreement with Telemundo Television Studios covering Spanish-language television performers, after fifteen months of negotiations. The agreement was later renewed, in 2021, with a few further adjustments.

== Social efforts ==
In May 2023, in a partnership with the Motion Picture Association of America as well as other entertainment industry unions, SAG-AFTRA launched the Green Council Initiative that would aim to encourage and promote environmentally responsible entertainment. According to Deadline, founding members would include Fran Drescher, Cate Blanchett, Robert Redford, Meryl Streep, Jeff Bridges, Diane Keaton, Kevin Bacon, Kyra Sedgwick, Salma Hayek, Gloria Estefan, Peter Sarsgaard, Rosario Dawson, Billy Porter, Aida Rodriguez, Jason Momoa, Rachel Bloom, Chris Colfer, David Dastmalchian, and Ellen Crawford."

== Artificial intelligence ==
SAG-AFTRA has stated that it seeks to regulate the use of deepfakes through collective bargaining agreements and legislation. In 2018, the union launched efforts to "fight back" against unregulated face-swapping technologies when they infringe on members' rights. According to Fast Company, artificial intelligence (AI) was a major sticking point for members of SAG-AFTRA and the Writers Guild of America during the 2023 Hollywood labor disputes.

SAG-AFTRA stated support for the NO FAKES Act, proposed US federal legislation concerning digital replicas. In 2024, SAG-AFTRA's national executive director and chief negotiator, Duncan Crabtree-Ireland, delivered testimony to members of the US Senate Judiciary Subcommittee on Intellectual Property about the NO FAKES Act, along with FKA Twigs. The union supported a California bill seeking enhanced safety precautions for training large language models.

During the same year, the union stated its support for the Ensuring Likeness Voice and Image Security Act (ELVIS Act), which updated Tennessee's protection of personal rights law to include entertainers under a shield against AI abuses. In September 2024, California Governor Gavin Newsom signed two bills into law at SAG-AFTRA's Los Angeles headquarters, strengthening protections to performers over the use of their digital likenesses.

In 2025, SAG-AFTRA, along with Association of Talent Agents, Creative Artists Agency, OpenAI, and United Talent Agency, expressed concern about members appearing in Sora 2's AI-generated videos without consent, announcing collaboration with OpenAI on guardrails around the company's opt-in policy for likeness and voice. The same year, Crabtree-Ireland was included in Time's "TIME100 AI" list for his work "forging protections for workers whose livelihoods are threatened by AI."

The union also supported the passage of California SB 683 to "remove unlawful content quickly, protecting the individuals whose voice or likeness is being misappropriated and the consumers who may be targeted by fraud", signed into law by Newsom in October 2025. The union also supported New York bills S.8420-A/A.8887-B, which "requires persons who produce or create an advertisement to identify if it includes AI generated synthetic performers", and S.8391/A.8882, which "requires consent from heirs or executors if a person wishes to use the name, image, or likeness of an individual for commercial purposes after their death."

In 2026, SAG-AFTRA's president, Sean Astin, delivered testimony to members of the House Judiciary Subcommittee on Courts, Intellectual Property, Artificial Intelligence, and the Internet about the NO FAKES Act.

== Leadership ==
=== Leadership history ===
As SAG, there were 28 presidents from 1933 to 2012 (with Ralph Morgan, Robert Montgomery, and Ronald Reagan holding non-consecutive, separate terms in office), and as AFTRA there were 22 presidents from 1937 to 2012.

In 2012, Ken Howard (who had been the President of SAG since 2009) became the first president of SAG-AFTRA, the merger between the Screen Actors Guild and the American Federation of Television and Radio Artists. In addition, he worked as co-president with former AFTRA President Roberta Reardon from 2012 to 2013. Upon his death in 2016, he was succeeded by Gabrielle Carteris who served as President until 2021. She was followed by Fran Drescher (of the Unite for Strength faction), who first became President in September 2021, and was re-elected in September 2023. Duncan Crabtree-Ireland has also been the National Executive Director since 2021.

On August 8, 2025, it was revealed that Drescher would not seek re-election to another term as SAG-AFTRA president, with Sean Astin, a member of Drescher's 2023 political slate and negotiating committee, and Chuck Slavin, a SAG-AFTRA New England Local board member, each vying to replace her. Voting on the new president began on August 13, 2025 and concluded on September 12, 2025. Astin was elected president, and Michelle Hurd was elected secretary-treasurer.

=== Presidents of SAG ===
Presidents of SAG
President	Term
Ralph Morgan	1933
Eddie Cantor	1933–1935
Robert Montgomery	1935–1938
Ralph Morgan	1938–1940
Edward Arnold	1940–1942
James Cagney	1942–1944
George Murphy	1944–1946
Robert Montgomery	1946–1947
Ronald Reagan	1947–1952
Walter Pidgeon	1952–1957
Leon Ames	1957–1958
Howard Keel	1958–1959
Ronald Reagan	1959–1960
George Chandler	1960–1963
Dana Andrews	1963–1965
Charlton Heston	1965–1971
John Gavin	1971–1973
Dennis Weaver	1973–1975
Kathleen Nolan	1975–1979
William Schallert	1979–1981
Ed Asner	1981–1985
Patty Duke	1985–1988
Barry Gordon	1988–1995
Richard Masur	1995–1999
William Daniels	1999–2001
Melissa Gilbert	2001–2005
Alan Rosenberg	2005–2009
Ken Howard	2009–2012

=== Presidents of AFTRA ===
Presidents of AFTRA
President	Term
Eddie Cantor	1937–1940
Lawrence Tibbett	1940–1946
Ken Carpenter	1946–1948
Bud Collyer	1948–1950
Knox Manning	1950–1952
Alan Bunce	1952–1954
Frank Nelson	1954–1957
Bud Collyer	1957–1959
Virginia Payne	1959–1961
Art Gilmore	1961–1963
Vicki Vola	1963–1965
Tyler McVey	1965–1967
Mel Brandt	1967–1970
Bill Baldwin	1970–1973
Ken Harvey	1973–1976
Joe Slattery	1976–1979
Bill Hillman	1979–1984
Frank Maxwell	1984–1989
Reed Farrell	1989–1993
Shelby Scott	1993–2001
John Connolly	2001–2007
Roberta Reardon	2007–2012

=== Presidents of SAG-AFTRA ===
Presidents of SAG-AFTRA
President	Term
Ken Howard	(Co-president 2012–2013; President 2013–2016)
Roberta Reardon	(Co-president 2012–2013)
Gabrielle Carteris	2016–2021
Fran Drescher	2021–2025
Sean Astin	2025–present

== See also ==
- ACTRA – similar English-language Canadian organization
- Union des artistes – ACTRA's francophone equivalent
- National Association of Actors – similar Mexican organization
