= Richard Sher (producer) =

Former host of panel show Says You!

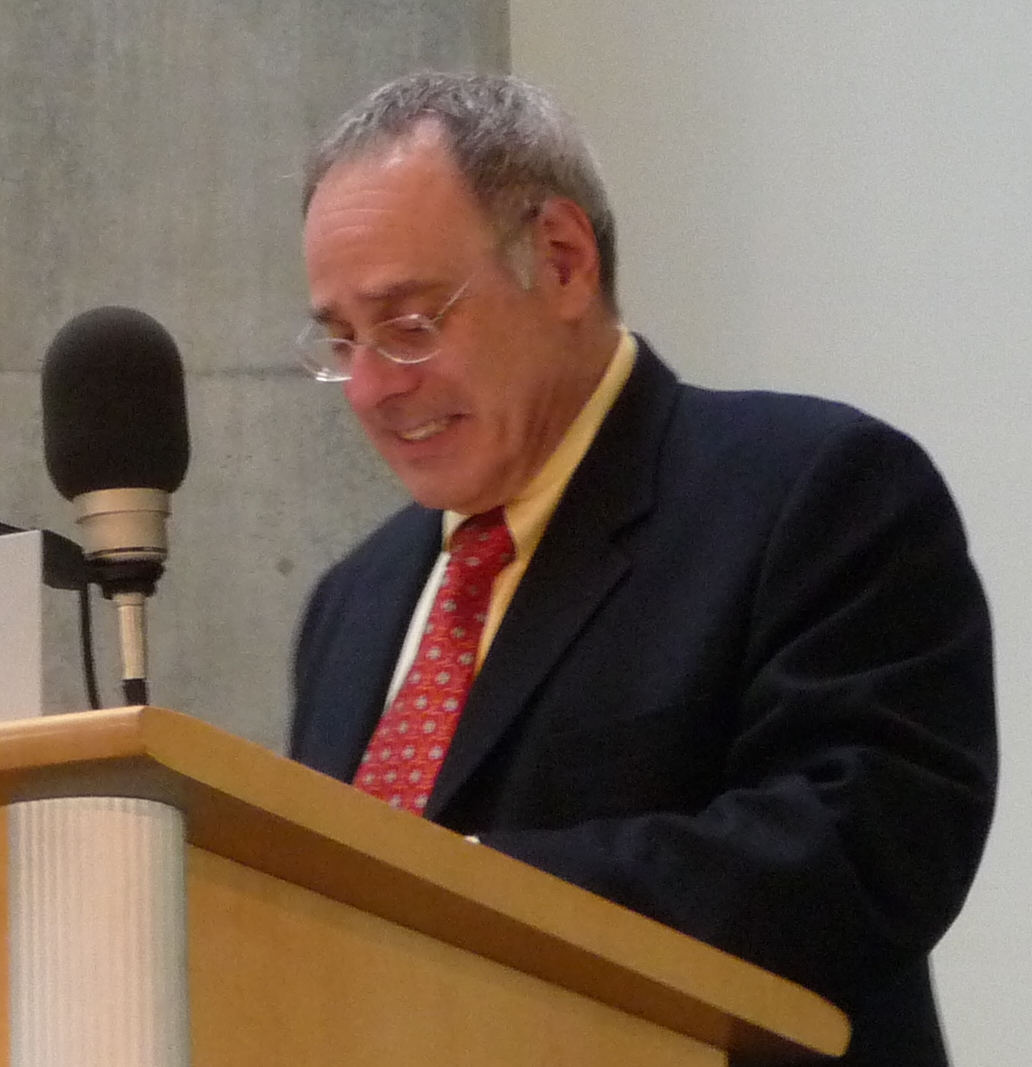
- Sher taping Says You! in 2009
- Born: July 18, 1948; Easton, Pennsylvania
- Died: February 9, 2015 (aged 66); Boston, Massachusetts
- Known for: Creator, Executive Producer, and Host of Says You!

Richard Sher (July 18, 1948 – February 9, 2015) was the creator, executive producer, and host of the panel show Says You!.

Sher graduated from Dickinson College in Carlisle, Pennsylvania and worked as an optician. He then got a master's degree in communications from Boston University. He worked as a producer on Boston TV shows Chronicle and Evening Magazine prior to creating Says You!
