= Sara Edwards (American television host) =

Sara Edwards is a freelance reporter, producer, film critic and media consultant who owns Sara Edwards Media, currently based in San Marino, California. She was previously based in Boston, Massachusetts where she was an entertainment and features reporter and film critic from 1981 to 2009.

Edwards grew up in San Marino, California, where she graduated from San Marino High School in 1970. She later attended UCLA where she studied television and film and graduated with a Bachelor of Arts degree in Communications. Edwards started her television career as a reporter for KLAS-TV in Las Vegas, Nevada.

After a television reporting job in Houston, Texas, and a one-year stint hosting the syndicated entertainment show "World of People" from 1980 to 1981 Edwards relocated to Boston, Massachusetts, where she was teamed with Barry Nolan as co-host of Evening Magazine on WBZ-TV from 1981 to 1990. She then joined crosstown WHDH-TV as an entertainment reporter from 1991 to 2003. While based there she also served as a film critic and entertainment reporter for NBC News Channel serving that network's affiliates across the United States. After her position at WHDH was eliminated Edwards joined Comcast's CN8 channel as executive producer and co-host of "Backstage" with former WBZ colleague Barry Nolan; after Nolan was terminated by CN8 for criticizing New England EMMY honoree and FOX News host Bill O'Reilly Edwards hosted the program solo. When CN8's New England operations were shut down "Backstage" was cancelled and Edwards was laid off. Edwards then started her own media company Sara Edwards Media. Originally based in Boston, after her home was burglarized over Thanksgiving holiday in 2009 she decided to return home to San Marino, California.

Edwards co-founded Wise Women...Now, a website about older women, with Lyn May and Sue Levit before departing with Levit to establish their own web venture.

Over the years, Edwards has earned many Emmy nominations and in 2008, won a New England Emmy for her producing and reporting work on "Backstage". She has also won three Telly Awards, a national award given by industry professionals, and a New England Cable Television award for excellence in programming. Edwards also holds three honorary degrees from universities in the Boston area.
