= Says You! =

Word game radio quiz show

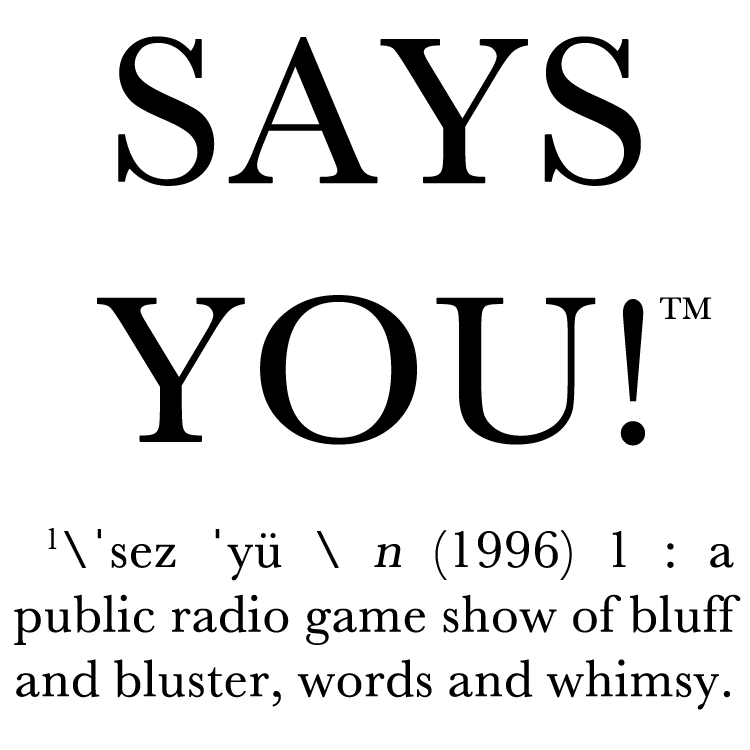
- Genre: Word game
- Running time: 60 minutes (2006–2021); 30 minutes (1997–2006)
- Country of origin: United States
- Home station: WGBH
- Syndicates: PRX
- Hosted by: Richard Sher; Barry Nolan; Gregg Porter; Dave Zobel
- Created by: Richard Sher
- Produced by: Pipit & Finch
- Executive producer: Laura Sher
- Original release: 1997 – 2023
- No. of series: 27
- No. of episodes: 600+
- Website: Official website
- Podcast: Says You!

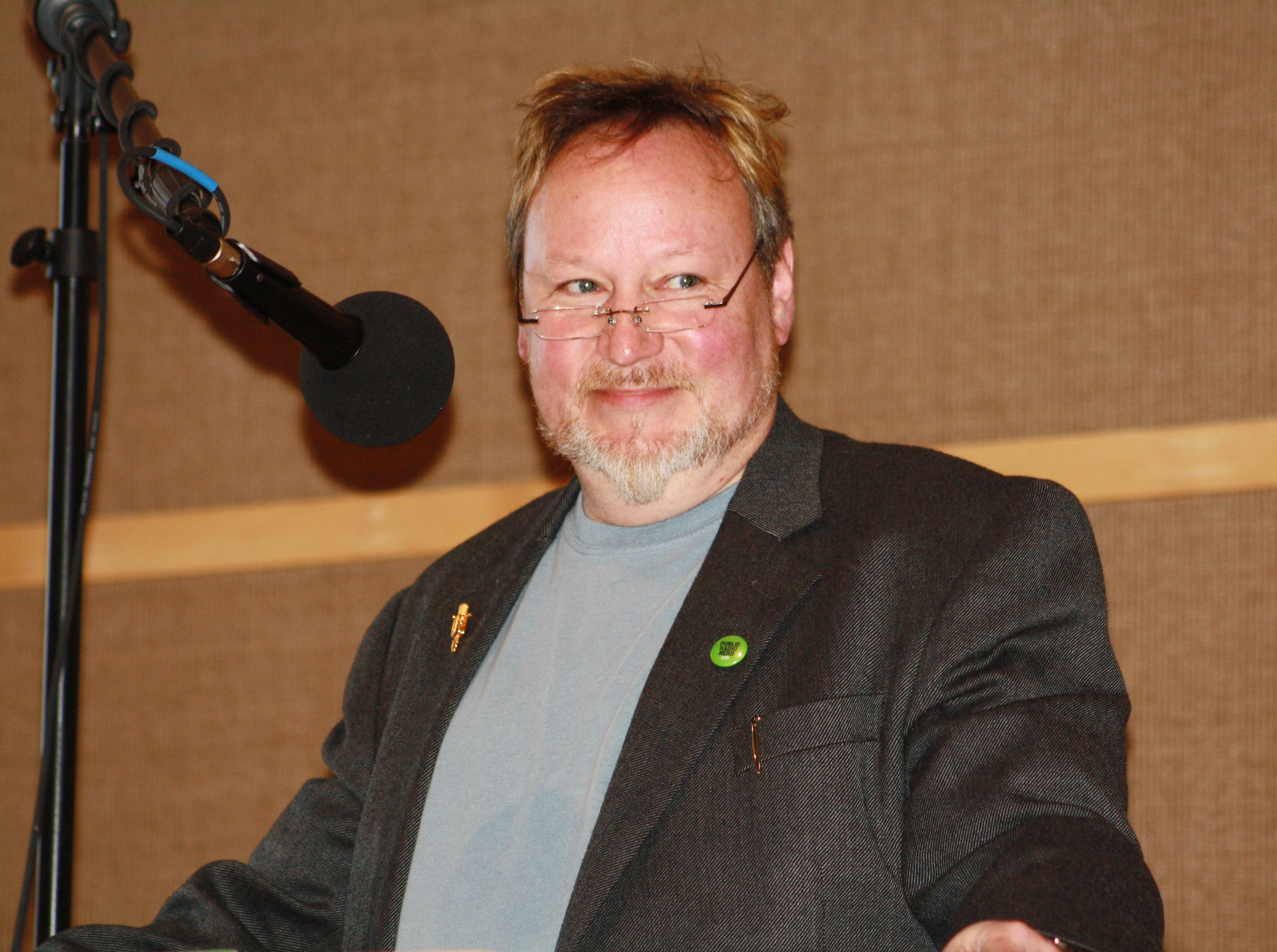
Gregg Porter, host of Says You! from 2017 to 2019

Says You! is a word game quiz show that aired weekly in the United States on public radio stations. Richard Sher created the show in 1996 with the guiding philosophy: "It's not important to KNOW the answers: it's important to LIKE the answers." The first episode to broadcast on radio took place in Cambridge, Massachusetts in February 1997.

Recorded in front of live audiences in theaters around the United States, the show is produced in Boston, Massachusetts. Its format, emphasis on witty repartee, and its tagline—"a game of bluff and bluster, words and whimsy"—are reminiscent of the similarly long-running BBC program My Word! (1956–1990). The first ten seasons of Says You! aired in a half hour timeslot before expanding to one hour in 2006, though half hour versions were offered to stations who wanted them. Season 21 of Says You! marked the show's 500th episode.

Richard Sher hosted Says You!'s first eighteen seasons, before his death on February 9, 2015. Original panelist Barry Nolan took over as host for the next two seasons, before returning to his seat as a panelist in early 2017. He was replaced as host by occasional panelist Gregg Porter of Seattle's KUOW-FM, with author/public radio contributor Dave Zobel (who came on as a Says You! writer after Sher's death) frequently guest hosting in 2018 and 2019 when Porter was absent or returning as a panelist. Porter left Says You! in the summer of 2019, with Zobel serving as permanent host until the end of season 25. Two final episodes hosted by former guest panelist Tom Bergeron and Richard Sher's son Ben (who voiced the episode-ending Pipit & Finch credit as a child and later served as a guest scorekeeper) were held in late 2022, but have yet to be posted online.

The COVID-19 pandemic forced taping for season 24 to conclude earlier than expected, with the last first-run episode with a live audience airing from Palo Alto, California on May 1, 2020. The remainder of the season and the entirety of season 25 consisted of new episodes recorded via Zoom or without a live audience, supplemented by reruns as well as 21 "Back 9" episodes, featuring nine rounds taken from three episodes apiece of early half-hour seasons. The final four first-run episodes featured a remote audience of ticket-buyers watching from home, with the last of these airing on August 13, 2021, with the season concluding primarily with "Back 9" re-airings. Stations that aired the half hour version of Says You! aired reruns from seasons 1–10 instead of "Back 9" episodes.

At the end of the 25th season, executive producer Laura Sher announced that production was ending and further seasons would consist of rebroadcasts. Seasons 26-27 aired from October 8, 2021, until February 2023, primarily featuring episodes from the show's eighth-twelfth seasons. Two final live episodes with studio audiences were held in Seattle & San Francisco at the start of season 27, but have not been posted online. Starting in February 2023, Says You! episodes became exclusive to podcasting services, focusing on episodes from seasons 1–13. The show's online store was closed in early 2024, and the last archival episode posted online was episode 33 of season 1 on June 28, 2024.

Over 250 episodes can be heard for free on-demand via Public Radio Exchange, including all first-run and Back 9 episodes from seasons 18–25, and all of the succeeding seasons' reruns. Says You!'s website previously sold 370 episodes from seasons 1–6 and 11–20 in their online store, and episodes dating back to 2017 can be heard on major podcasting platforms.

Pop culture podcast The Incomparable Game Show has adapted the Says You! format under the name Inconceivable! for thirty-eight episodes since 2015, as hosted by Dan Moren, who eulogized Richard Sher at the end of their second episode. Inconceivable! is primarily based around pop culture and science fiction topics, while also implementing wagering for the Bluffing Rounds (renamed the Fake-Off Rounds there).

== Format ==
The show features a regular group of panelists divided into two three-person teams. The two teams are made up of the show's original cast members and (when necessary) occasional guest players. Teams answer a series of questions to earn up to 10 points for each correct—or humorously suitable—answer. As the host provides more clues, and/or panelists get extra help from their teammates, fewer points are awarded, while partially correct or objectively humorous responses may also receive lesser points. Score-keepers (usually children or teenagers) keep track of the score of each game. Despite the scoring, games do not have stakes beyond bragging rights, and ties (often the result of intentionally generous round 5 scoring) are not uncommon.

=== Rounds of the game ===
Rounds 1, 3, and 5 vary from week to week and consist of signature categories such as "Definitions & Derivations", "What's the Difference?", "Odd Man Out", "Melded Movies", and "Common Threads", as well as a variety of miscellaneous literary wordplay. Typically, six questions per round are asked, one aimed at each individual panelist, though assistance and interjections from their teammates are common. The host traditionally advises listeners to grab a pen & paper to play along with the teams, as "that's how we do it here". On occasion, that week's musical guest aids in a game themed around song lyrics, typically played as the final round. Some rounds reflected the culture, community names, and history of the location of that taping.

Rounds 2 and 4 are the Bluffing Rounds. Similar to the game show Liar's Club and the radio show Call My Bluff, the three members of one team are given an obscure word (e.g. cacafuego); one of them gets the actual definition, and the other two must bluff with fake definitions composed during a brief musical interlude, traditionally provided by a live musical guest. The other team attempts to determine the correct definition from the three presented. Ten points are awarded for guessing or bluffing successfully. Select early episodes instead featured a "Biofictionary" round, where teams had to guess the claim to fame of a person rather than a word's definition; this round was last held in season 11.

Compilation episodes occurred sporadically in early seasons, usually featuring rounds not included from a set of tapings, before the conceit returned via the "Back 9" episodes during the COVID-19 pandemic. To pad out the runtime of hour-long episodes, bonus content included a longer introduction, plugs from the host/panelists for their website, upcoming episodes, and ticket availability, as well as a mailbag segment where Richard Sher answered listener questions and issued corrections. Also commonly heard between rounds 4 and 5 was a "Spotlight Round", which highlighted memorable rounds from earlier seasons, often suggested by listeners. Following Richard Sher's death in 2015, Spotlight Rounds were often picked to honor him. The "Back 9" episodes featured nine rounds (six normal, three Bluffing) from assorted episodes of Says You! from seasons 1-7 featuring the original panelists

Through the show's website, people could suggest questions and segments for the show, with frequent contributors nicknamed as "Says You! Hall of Famers".

== Players ==
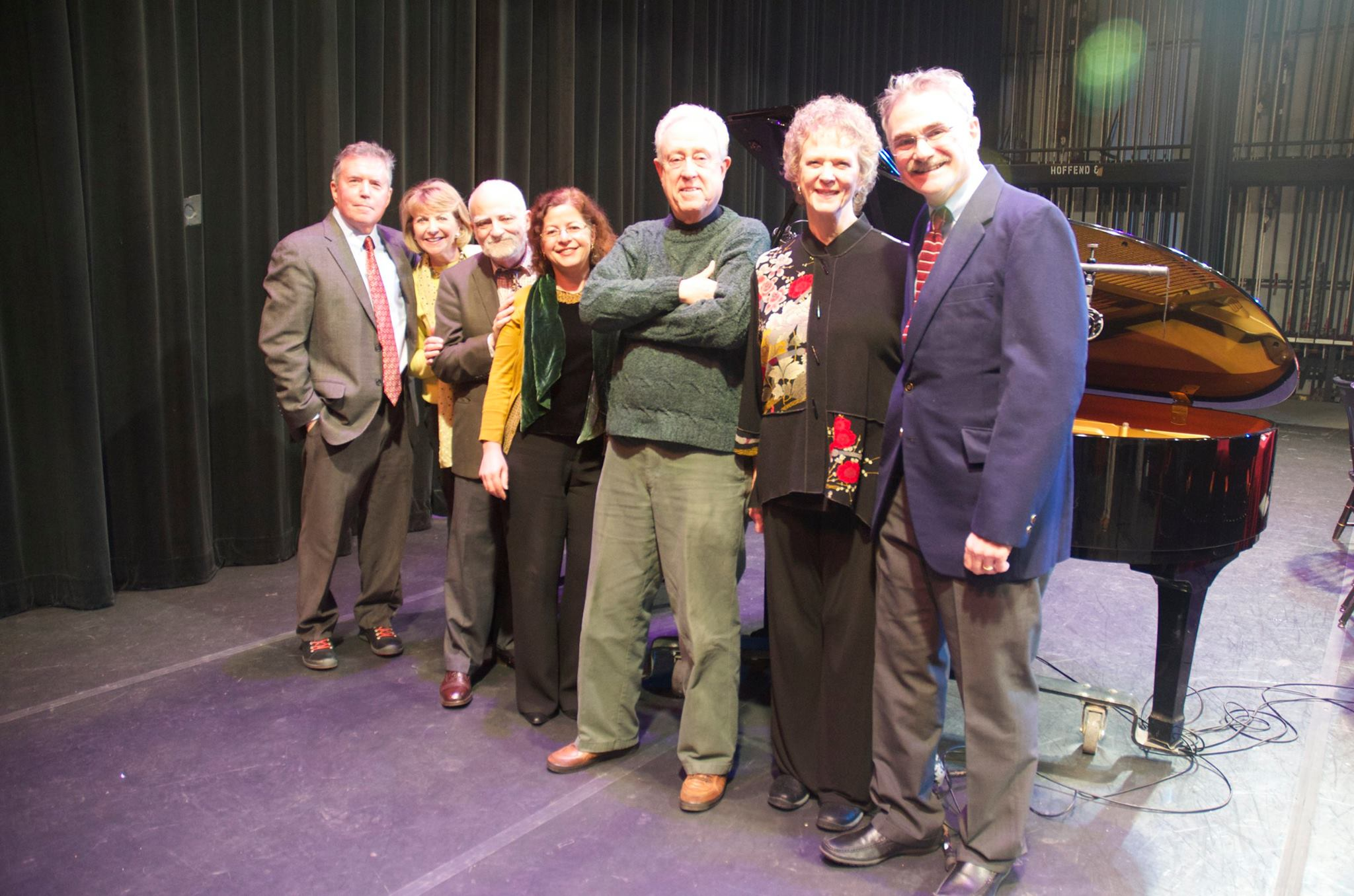
The regular cast of Says You! in season 19, from left to right: then-host Barry Nolan, Francine Achbar, Tony Kahn, Carolyn Faye Fox, Arnie Reisman, Paula Lyons, and Murray Horwitz

=== Hosts ===
- Richard Sher (creator, producer, host from 1996 to 2015)
- Barry Nolan (host from 2015 to 2017; regular panelist in other seasons)
- Gregg Porter (host from 2017 to 2019; recurring panelist from 2015 to 2018)
- Dave Zobel (host from 2019 to 2021, frequent guest host from 2017 to 2019; question writer from 2015 to 2021)

=== Original panelists ===
- Francine Achbar
- Carolyn Faye Fox
- Tony Kahn
- Paula Lyons (wife of Arnie Reisman)
- Barry Nolan (host from 2015 to 2017; husband of Garland Waller)
- Arnie Reisman (husband of Paula Lyons)

The original panelists of Says You! are by far the most regularly appearing panelists in the show's history, each appearing in over half of all episodes. Especially in earlier seasons, episodes usually featured Carolyn Faye Fox, Arnie Reisman, and Paula Lyons on one team and Tony Kahn, Francine Achbar, and Barry Nolan on the other team, with substitutions for panelist unavailability where needed. Crossovers between these panelist pairings on the same team only happened on rare occasions. The first team was typically introduced as sitting "stereo left/right" and the other was introduced as "Team 2", but they were usually referred to by whoever the captains were on that episode afterwards. During Barry Nolan's two seasons as host of Says You!, Murray Horwitz took his place as a regular panelist in most episodes, and remained a regular after Barry returned to the panel. Lenore Shannon is the most frequently heard non-regular panelist, appearing in over 70 episodes.

=== Regular and featured panelists ===
- Pat Bagley, editorial cartoonist
- May Berenbaum, entemologist
- Tom Bergeron, television host
- Tim Brooks, historian
- Callie Crossley, journalist & radio host
- Alan Dershowitz, Harvard professor and lawyer
- Walter Egan, musician
- Norman Gilliland, radio producer
- Deb Hiett (regular panelist in seasons 24–25; recurring panelist in seasons 22–23)
- Murray Horwitz (regular panelist in seasons 12 and 19–25; recurring panelist in other seasons)
- Philip Klinkner, political scientist
- Joyce Kulhawik, film critic (regular panelist in season 25)
- Paul Magid (regular panelist in season 25; recurring panelist in seasons 23–24)
- Wendie Malick, actress
- Constance McCashin, psychotherapist & actress; wife of Sam Weisman
- Erin McKean, founder of Wordnik
- Phil Proctor, member of the Firesign Theatre
- Lenore Shannon, physician recruiter
- Ammon Shea, writer
- Jimmy Tingle, political humorist
- Garland Waller, professor; wife of Barry Nolan
- Sam Weisman, film director; husband of Constance McCashin
- Robin Young, radio host

Numerous panelists have appeared as guests, often for only one or two tapings, including personalities from journalism, political science, broadcasting, the arts, science, law, and medicine. Often, guest panelists are local to where the episode in question was taped, with some being employees of the radio station who aired Says You! in that market.

=== Writers ===
- Nat Segaloff
- Dave Zobel
