= Duncan Crabtree-Ireland =

American business executive (born 1970s)

- Crabtree-Ireland in 2026
- Born: 1971 or 1972 (age 54–55); Memphis, Tennessee, U.S.
- Education: Georgetown University; University of California, Davis
- Occupations: National executive director and chief negotiator of SAG-AFTRA
- Employer: SAG-AFTRA

Duncan Crabtree-Ireland is an American business executive and the national executive director and chief negotiator for SAG-AFTRA. He joined the trade union in 2000 and has also held the roles of general counsel and chief operating officer. Crabtree-Ireland has been a judge pro tem of the Los Angeles County Superior Court and an adjunct professor at the USC Gould School of Law. He is a board member of the SAG-AFTRA Foundation, the Entertainment Community Fund, and the Motion Picture & Television Fund.

== Early life and education ==
Crabtree-Ireland was born in Memphis, Tennessee, and raised in Dallas. He earned a bachelor’s degree in international law and policy from Georgetown University, and a Juris Doctor degree from the University of California, Davis in 1998. He had considered joining the U.S. Foreign Service and becoming a professional diplomat.

== Career ==
Crabtree-Ireland worked as a prosecutor for the Los Angeles County District Attorney's office for two years, before joining SAG-AFTRA in 2000. He became general counsel in 2006, and was named chief operating officer in 2014. Crabtree-Ireland also served as deputy national executive director of the Screen Actors Guild (SAG). He has held the roles of national executive director and chief negotiator since 2021.

Crabtree-Ireland represented the trade union during negotiations of the Beijing Treaty on Audiovisual Performances, which was adopted by the World Intellectual Property Organization in 2012 and regulates copyright for audiovisual performances and expands performers' rights. He also played a major role in the merger between SAG and American Federation of Television and Radio Artists (AFTRA) in 2012. He worked on an international treaty on intellectual property, and negotiated with Telemundo to create the first labor contract in the United States for telenovela actors. During the COVID-19 pandemic, Crabtree-Ireland worked on safety measures and participated in negotiations with studios on return-to-work agreements in 2020. He was the lead negotiator during the 2023 SAG-AFTRA strike, and also in the 2024-2025 SAG-AFTRA video game strike. He heads the union's bilingual initiative, and co-hosts the podcast SAG-AFTRA en Español, alongside Ana Carolina Grajales.

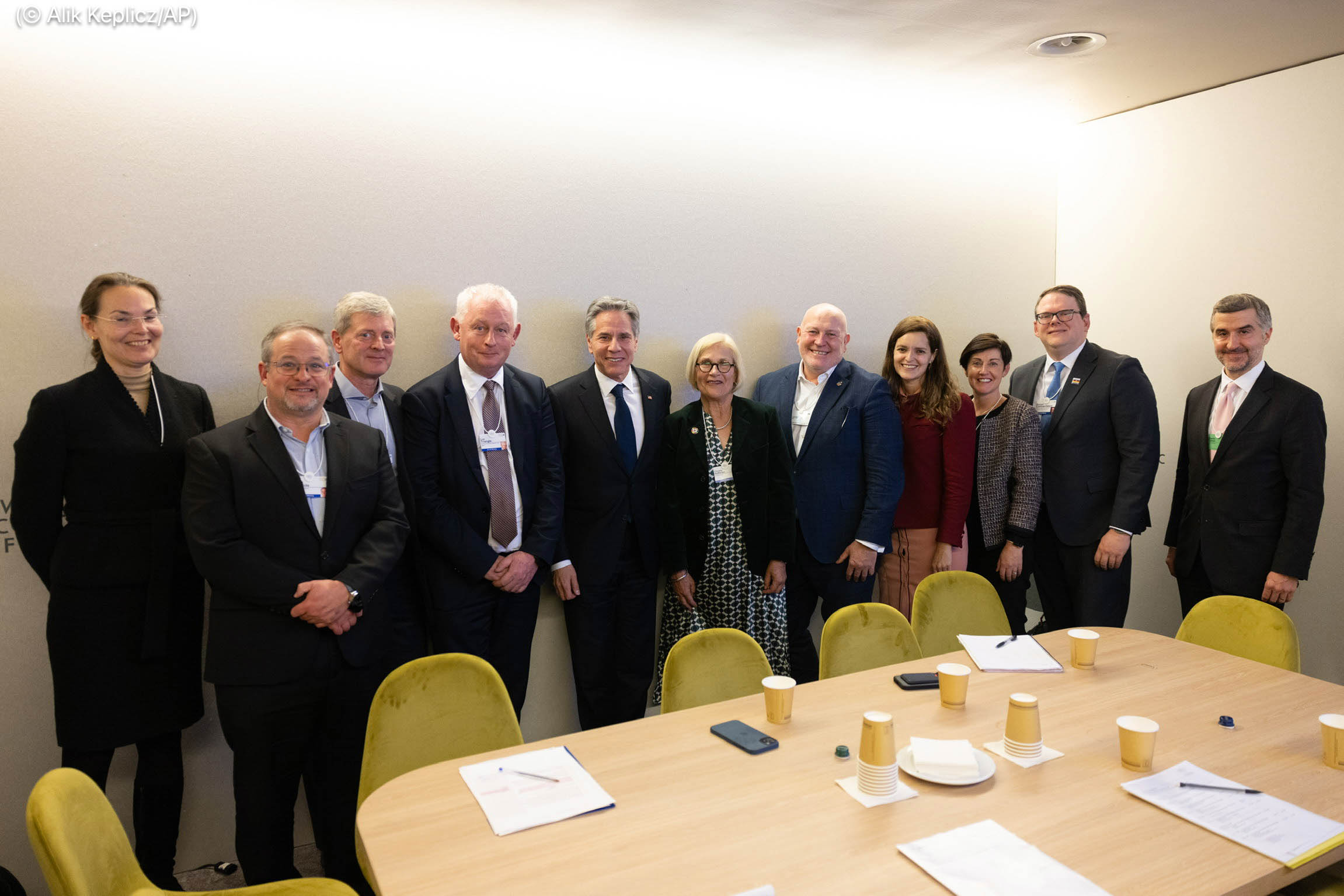
Crabtree-Ireland (second from right) with the U.S. Secretary of State, Antony Blinken (fifth from left), and other labor union leaders in Davos in 2024

Crabtree-Ireland has led several departments at SAG-AFTRA, including: administration and information technology; diversity, equity, and inclusion; government affairs; governance; legal; professional representatives; and public policy. According to The Hollywood Reporter, he "helped land the first augmentation of streaming payments to include worldwide usage and the first health and retirement plan contributions from streaming payments". Crabtree-Ireland is also a judge pro tem of the Los Angeles County Superior Court and an adjunct professor at the USC Gould School of Law.

Crabtree-Ireland received the Peggy Browning Award and the Co-President's Award from the LGBTQ+ Lawyers Association of Los Angeles. In 2023, he was included in Out magazine's annual Out100 list, as well as Variety's annual list of the 500 most influential business leaders in the media industry. He was among the recipients of the Impact Award at the 7th Astra Film Awards in 2024.

=== Board service ===
Crabtree-Ireland was appointed to SoundExchange's board of directors in 2012. He is chairperson of the SAG-AFTRA & Industry Sound Recordings Distribution Fund's board of trustees, as well as co-chair of the American Federation of Music & SAG-AFTRA Intellectual Property Rights Distribution Fund's board of trustees. Crabtree-Ireland is also a board member of the SAG-AFTRA Foundation, the SAG-AFTRA Health Plan, the SAG-Producers Pension Plan, and the Motion Picture & Television Fund, and he is on the board of trustees of the Entertainment Community Fund.

== Personal life ==
Crabtree-Ireland and his husband were among the first 100 same-sex couples to get married in San Francisco in 2004 before the unions were annulled by the Supreme Court of California. The couple live in Los Angeles, and have adopted five children.

== See also ==
- 2023 Hollywood labor disputes
- List of Georgetown University alumni
- List of University of California, Davis alumni
