= Murray Horwitz =

American dramatist

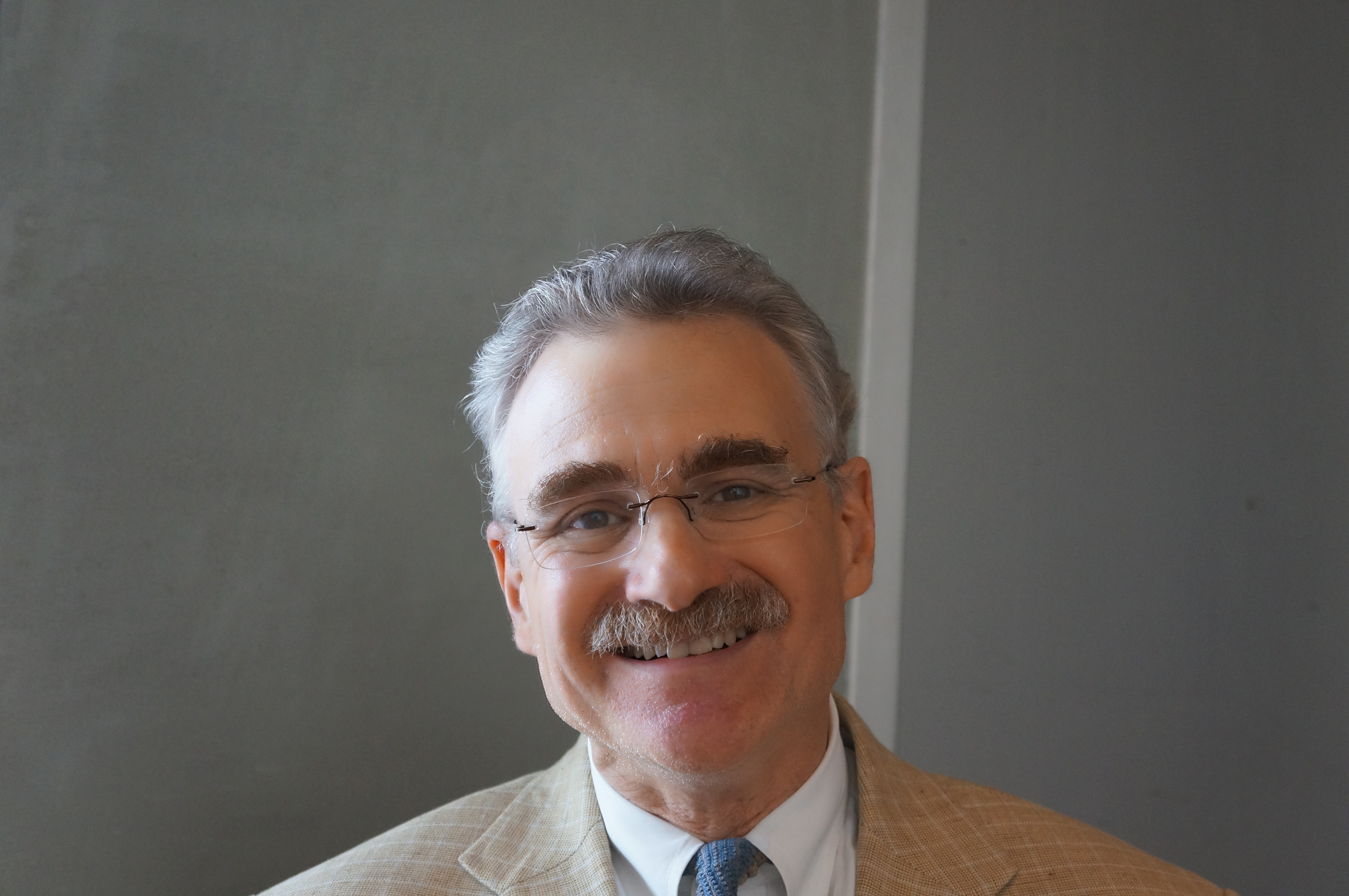
- Murray Horwitz in 2013
- Born: September 28, 1949 (age 76); Dayton, Ohio
- Occupations: American actor, writer, NPR broadcaster, arts administrator
- Years active: 1987–present
- Spouse: Lisa Miller (m. September 7, 1974)
- Children: Charles; Ann; Alexander

Murray Horwitz (born September 28, 1949) is an American playwright, lyricist, NPR broadcaster, and arts administrator.

== Personal life ==
Horwitz was born in Dayton, Ohio, on September 28, 1949, to Alan S. (a physician) and Charlotte (née Vangrov) Horwitz. He is married to singer Lisa Miller and has three children, Charles, Ann, and Alexander. They live in Chevy Chase, MD.

== Education ==
Horwitz graduated from Kenyon College with a bachelor of arts degree, with a dual major, in English and Drama. In 1992, he received an honorary doctorate of fine arts from Kenyon College.

== Career ==
Horwitz began his career working with Ringling Brothers Barnum & Bailey Circus as a clown for three years.

In 1973, after moving to New York City, Horwitz appeared in the one-man show, An Evening of Sholom Aleichem, which was directed by Richard Maltby Jr., and in which he continues to perform at The Kennedy Center, The Manhattan Theatre Club, and The New York Shakespeare Festival/Public Theater.

In 1978, Horwitz created Ain't Misbehavin' with Richard Maltby Jr. The musical is named after a Fats Waller song. Horwitz received multiple awards for co-writing Ain't Misbehavin', including a Tony, Obie, Emmy, Grammy, and New York Drama Critics' Circle award.

He became the assistant director of Opera-Musical Theater at the National Endowment for the Arts in 1987. Since 1998, Horwitz has been creative consultant to the annual Mark Twain Prize ceremonies at the Kennedy Center.

In 1989, he began his career at NPR, where he was instrumental in giving radio game show Wait Wait... Don't Tell Me! its start. He is also frequently a panelist on another public radio game show, Says You!. He was also involved with Wynton Marsalis: Making the Music, and The NPR Basic Jazz Record Library. Horwitz received three Peabody awards for his work at NPR.

In 2002, Horwitz became the founding director of the AFI Silver Theatre and Cultural Center, in Silver Spring, Maryland. He was the director and chief executive officer from 2002 until 2009. He later served in fundraising positions at Washington National Opera and the Washington Performing Arts Society.

In 2016, Horwitz took over as host of WAMU's The Big Broadcast old-time radio show.

He gave Lin-Manuel Miranda critical suggestions and bought him his first rhyming dictionary when Miranda was writing his first play, In the Heights.

He is also a co-host of the podcast "Question of the Day".

=== Credits and achievements ===
(in chronological and subject order)

- Stage Debut—Clown, Ringling Brothers, Barnum and Bailey Circus, 1970–1972.
- New York Debut—An Evening with Sholom Aleichem, Manhattan Theatre Club, 1975–1976.
- London Debut—co-author, associate director, Ain't Misbehavin', Her Majesty's Theatre, 1979.
- Principal Theater Appearances
  - An Evening of Sholom Aleichem, Grendel's Lair, Philadelphia, PA, 1975–1976.
  - The Body Politic, Chicago, IL, 1979.
  - An Evening of Yiddish Poetry, New York Shakespeare Festival, 1980;The Ballroom, NY, 1983.
- Principal Theatre Work
  - Comedy consultant, Puntila, Yale Repertory Theatre, New Haven, CT, 1977.
  - Co-author, associate director, lyricist, Ain't Misbehavin, Longacre Theatre, NY, Plymouth Theatre, NY, Morosco Theatre, NY, London, and Paris, 1978--. Also, director, Ain't Misbehavin, Stagewest, Alaska Repertory Theatre, and Kansas City Starlight Theatre.
  - Director, Jus' Like Livin', Chelsea's West Side Theatre, NY, 1979.
  - Actor, writer, and director, Hard Sell, New York Shakespeare Festival, 1980.
  - Writer and director, Carnegie at Midnight (ninetieth anniversary celebration), Carnegie Hall, NY, 1981.
  - Actor and director, A Comedy Cabaret with Jonathan Winters, Kenyon Festival, OH, 1981.
  - Writer and director, While Shubert Slept, reopening of the Shubert Theatre, New Haven, CT, 1984.
  - Writer and director, This Is Opening Night, reopening of the State Theatre, Cleveland, OH, 1984.
  - Co-author and co-director, Haarlem Nocturne, La Mama Experimental TheatreClub, NY, then Latin Quarter Theatre, NY, 1984.
- Principal Concert Work
  - Producer, writer, and director, A Tribute to Stan Kenton, Kool Jazz Festival, Avery Fisher Hall, NY, 1982.
- Principal Film Appearances
  - Yogurt man, Night of the Juggler, Columbia, 1980.
- Principal Television Work; Director
  - Guiding Light, CBS, 1985.
  - As the World Turns, CBS, 1985.
  - Search for Tomorrow, NBC, 1985–1986.
- Producer
  - The Making of a Song, Arts and Entertainment Network, 1981.
  - America, Where It All Happens, Arts and Entertainment, 1981.
  - Jazz Comes Home to Newport, PBS, 1984.
- Writer
  - (In addition to the above items) Talking Morosco Blues (cabaret), Upstairs at O'Neals, NY, 1982–1983.
  - (Screenplay with others) Soldier Boy, Universal, 1982.
