= Tony Pepper =

Tony Pepper was an American journalist who was a news anchor for WBZ-TV from 1974 to 1981.

== Early life ==
Pepper was the son of Paul and Lucille (Hazard) Pepper. He grew up in Long Beach, California. His first job in news was as a printer's devil for a newspaper in Santa Cruz, California. When he was 17 he enlisted in the United States Navy and served in Asia as a photojournalist. Following his discharge he earned an associate degree from Santa Barbara City College.

== Career ==
=== Early work ===
Pepper began his career in 1964 at KDB/KDB-FM in Santa Barbara, California. He then worked as a sports and news anchor at KOVR-TV in Sacramento, California. He then moved to Denver, where he was the weekend anchor and a talk show host at KBTV. In 1972 he became a news anchor at KOA-TV.

=== WBZ ===
In July 1974, Pepper moved to Boston, where he co-anchored WBZ's 6 pm and 11 pm newscasts with Tom Ellis. Ellis left the station the following year and Pepper was joined by Jack Williams. In 1980 he signed a 5-year contract to stay with WBZ.

In 1981, WBZ-TV was passed in the ratings by WCVB-TV, ending WBZ's two-decade run as the city's most watched news station. The Pepper/Williams pairing was broken up, with Pepper co-anchoring the 6 pm broadcast with Chris Marrou and the 11 pm broadcast with Liz Walker. Pepper was described by Jack Thomas of The Boston Globe as having an antagonistic on-air relationship with Marrou and Walker. On March 9, 1981, the Boston Herald American published an interview in which Pepper criticized his station management. He stated that if the station partnered him with "a dunderhead, then how can I change? … If someone says something that's so stupid and so simplistic, then I've got to prove to the audience that I don't feel that way", that he remained with the station because "I know that if I left, they'd replace me with some type of blond, Jay Scott-type. That could negate everything I've been working for", and that he hoped "Management might finally get their fingers out of our operation". Shortly after the interview was published, WBZ-TV general manager Sy Yanoff announced that Pepper would be allowed to pursue employment opportunities outside of Boston. By July of that year, Pepper had been taken off the 11 pm newscast. He left the station on December 10, 1981.

=== Later career ===
In 1982, Pepper was hired to co-host WRKO's morning drive time show with Janet Jeghelian. The Pepper-Jeghelian team was able to triple WRKO's ratings in the morning time slot. In 1984, Pepper chose not to renew his contract and left the station. He later hosted a noontime program for WMRE and hosted infomercials.

== Personal life ==
Pepper's first marriage ended in divorce. He had two children. In 1987 his 21-year-old son was killed in a car accident. In 2000 he married his longtime partner Dorothy Butler. He was a resident of Waban, Massachusetts. Pepper died on April 3, 2018, of complications from diabetes and heart disease. He was 79 years old.
