= Jack Williams (news anchor) =

American news anchor

- Born: October 29, 1944 (age 81); Pocatello, Idaho
- Education: University of Oregon (B.S., Journalism, 1968)
- Occupations: TV presenter, journalist
- Known for: News anchor for WBZ-TV of Boston

Jack Williams is a retired 6 PM weekday news anchor on WBZ-TV in Boston, Massachusetts. He also founded "Wednesday's Child" in 1981, a non-profit adoption agency for special needs children.

== Early career ==
Originally from Pocatello, Idaho, Williams worked in radio from 1959 until he graduated Phi Beta Kappa from the University of Oregon in 1968. During college, he worked as a news anchor/reporter for KUGN Radio in Eugene, Oregon.

He first appeared on television in 1968 on KIRO-TV in Seattle, Washington, anchoring their 11:00 news. He later worked at KORK-TV (now KSNV-DT) in Las Vegas, Nevada, where he was the principal anchor and news director, before joining WBZ in 1975.

== Career ==
Up until 2012, he worked at WBZ with Lisa Hughes as an anchor at 6 and 11 PM; in 2012 he decided to stop working the 11 PM news and only work the 6 PM.

First paired with Tony Pepper, he was a lead anchor at the station starting in 1975. He was demoted briefly in 1981 to the 5:30 newscast, but quickly regained one of the top anchor slots with the popular Liz Walker as co-anchor for both the 6:00 and 11:00 newscasts until 1992, when the station went to a half hour format at 6:00, and instead began their evening news at 5:00.

On Tuesday, March 20, 2012, Williams announced he was stepping down from the 11 PM newscasts, but would continue on the station as a co-anchor on the 6 pm newscast, a position he held until August 29, 2014. After stepping down from the 6pm news cast, Williams remained with the station for special segments and for "Wednesday's Child". He also worked as a substitute for other news anchors like Jonathan Elias, Paula Ebben, David Wade, and Lisa Hughes.

Williams announced his retirement on June 23, 2015 and his last day as a WBZ anchor was June 25, 2015.

== Wednesday's Child ==
In 1981, Williams founded "Wednesday's Child", a non-profit adoption agency for special needs children. A different child is featured every Wednesday at 6PM. He has been honored by Presidents Ronald Reagan and Bill Clinton at the White House for his efforts.

== Honorary degrees ==
Williams has received honorary doctorate degrees from Curry College, Salem State University, Fitchburg State University, Merrimack College, Framingham State University, Worcester State University, Newbury College, and Wheelock College.

== Awards ==
- 2012 Lifetime Achievement Award from the Radio Television Digital News Association (RTDNA).
- Inducted into the Massachusetts Broadcasters Hall of Fame
- 2012 Yankee Quill Award (Academy of New England Journalists)
- 2001 Governor’s Award from the New England Emmy organization, recognizing his career accomplishments.
- 1997 honored at the White House by President Bill Clinton and the First Lady, with the first Adoption 2002 Excellence Award.
- 1990 Martin Luther Burstein Volunteer Award
- 1987 N. Neal Pike Prize for service to handicapped persons by Boston University Law School
- 1986 Presidential Citation from President Ronald Reagan in the Rose Garden at the White House for “Wednesday’s Child”
- 1984 first national media award ever presented by the Association for Persons with Severe Handicaps (TASH)

== Personal ==
Williams lives in Las Vegas with his wife, Marci. He has four daughters, Kari, Tracy, Wendy, and Amy, from a previous marriage.
