= Shelby Scott =

American journalist (1936–2022)

Shelby Scott (born Shelby Schuck; January 6, 1936 – June 1, 2022) was an American journalist and union leader who was a longtime reporter for WBZ-TV in Boston. She began her career in Seattle, where she was the city's first female newscaster. She was employed by WBZ-TV from 1965 to 1996, where she became known for her blizzard coverage. She served as president of the American Federation of Television and Radio Artists from 1993 to 2001 and helped lead that union's merger with the Screen Actors Guild.

== Early life ==
Scott was born in Seattle on January 6, 1936, to Harry and Inga Ring Schuck. Her father was a building maintenance man and her mother was a grade-school teacher and a Finnish immigrant. She graduated from Franklin High School and earned a bachelor's degree in communications from the University of Washington.

== Journalism ==
Scott began her career as a traffic manager for KIRO-TV in Seattle. She later served as an on-air reporter, writer, film editor, and documentary producer for KIRO-TV.

In 1965 she moved to Boston's WBZ-TV, where, at the suggestion of station management, she went by Shelby Scott on-air. Her first story for the station was the Northeast blackout of 1965. In 1966 she began anchoring WBZ's News at Noon. In 1975 she began anchoring the station's 5:30 pm news broadcast as well. In 1978 she and Gail Harris became the city's first all-female anchor team.

In 1980 she was demoted from the anchor desk to general assignment reporter. She covered politics and state government, but became most known for her coverage of winter storms. She retired from WBZ in February 1996, but continued to cover storms for the station as a freelance reporter.

== AFTRA ==
Scott served as president of the American Federation of Television and Radio Artists' Boston local and was elected to the union's national board in 1981. After serving as national first vice president, she was elected president of AFTRA in 1993. In 1999 the union approved a constitutional amendment eliminating term-limits on the presidency, which allowed Scott to serve a fourth two-year term. In 1997, President Bill Clinton appointed her to the Advisory Committee on Public Interest Obligations of Digital Television Broadcasters. She was one of the SAG and AFTRA leaders who led the movement to merge the two unions in 2012.

== Later life ==
Scott retired to Tucson, Arizona, but maintained a summer home on Cushing Island in Maine. She died on June 1, 2022, at her home in Tucson.
