= Suzanne Bates =

American journalist (born 1956)

Suzanne Bates (born January 11, 1956) is an American business consultant and executive coach based in Wellesley, Massachusetts who is regarded as an authority on executive communication. She wrote two books on business communications which were described as bestsellers. She worked as an on-air reporter and anchor for television stations in Boston, Tampa and Philadelphia. In 2000, Bates started her consulting firm, Bates Communications, to coach business executives in matters related to executive communication. It is based in Wellesley, a suburb of Boston. Her firm advises clients such as Fidelity Investments, Raytheon, Dow Chemical, and Blue Cross Blue Shield. Bates was born in Danville, Illinois and received a bachelor's degree in journalism from the University of Illinois. She is an avid gardener.

== Publications ==
- Speak like a CEO: Secrets for Commanding Attention and Getting Results, McGraw-Hill Education, 2005, ISBN 978-0-071-45151-2
- Motivate like a CEO: Communicate Your Strategic Vision and Inspire People to Act, McGraw-Hill Education, 2009, ISBN 978-0-071-60029-3
- Discover Your CEO Brand: Secrets to Embracing and Maximizing Your Unique Value as a Leader, McGraw-Hill Education, 2012, ISBN 978-0-071-76286-1
- All the Leader You Can Be: The Science of Achieving Extraordinary Executive Presence, McGraw-Hill Education, 2016, ISBN 978-1-259-58577-7
