= Barry Nolan =

American television presenter

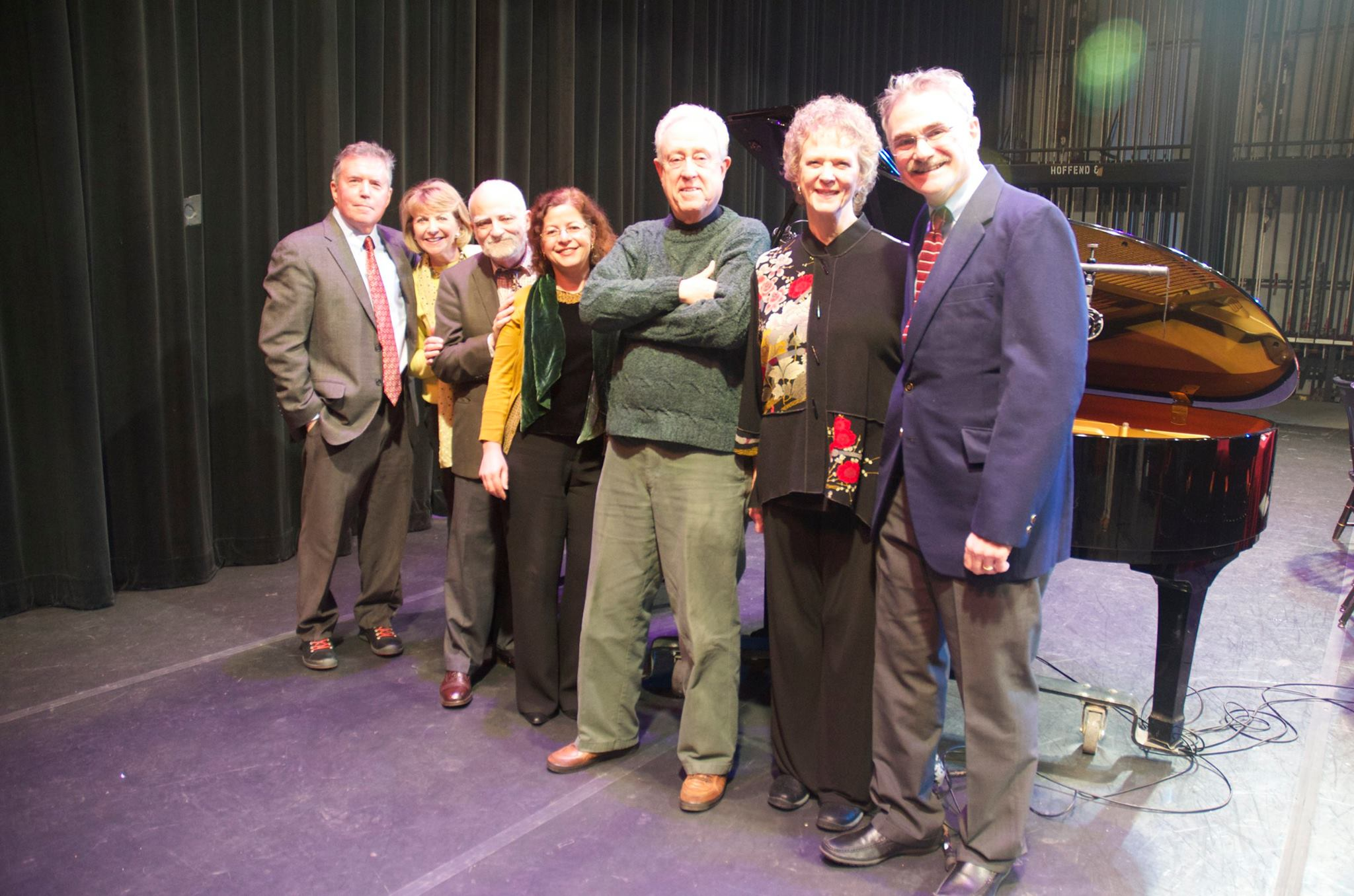
Barry Nolan at far left with the rest of the cast of Says You!

Barry Nolan (born June 17, 1947) is an American former presenter on Comcast Cable's CN8 channel, once hosting the shows Nitebeat, Backstage, and Backstage with Barry Nolan. He is a panelist on Says You!, a weekend radio word quiz show produced by Pipit and Finch and carried on many public radio stations. Following the death of the program's creator and original host Richard Sher in 2015, Nolan became the program's second host until rejoining the panel in 2017.

== Background and personal life ==
Nolan is from Alexandria, Virginia and went to college at the University of Tennessee. Nolan married Deborah Reed in 1981 and had three children: Christian, Delaney, and Alexander. He and Reed separated 1991 and divorced in 2002. He married Garland Waller in 2004 and now lives in Newton, Massachusetts.

He was once a social worker and is a member of Mensa.

== Career ==
Nolan hosted Boston's version of Evening Magazine for WBZ-TV (Channel 4) from 1980 until 1989. He briefly left the series near the end of the 1988–89 season to host a series of one-hour specials for ABC titled Over the Edge. This was followed by a stint as correspondent for Fox's Beyond Tomorrow for a season. Nolan then served as co-host for the Paramount Television magazine series Hard Copy from 1991 to 1998, and then became a senior correspondent for Extra from 2000 until 2003. He later moved to CN8 as an executive producer and host of Nitebeat.

Nolan was fired by CN8 on 20 May 2008 for distributing fliers at an Emmy award show dinner on 10 May. Nolan was protesting the award of the National Academy of Television Arts and Sciences Governors' Award to political commentator Bill O'Reilly, and distributed a self-prepared flier with quotes from O'Reilly's shows, as well as quotes from a sexual harassment lawsuit against O'Reilly. Soon afterwards, O'Reilly wrote to Comcast's CEO, mentioning the mutual business interests between Comcast and Fox, and saying "...it was puzzling to see a Comcast employee, Barry Nolan, use Comcast corporate assets to attack me and FNC." He said that Nolan had attended the Emmy Awards "in conjunction with Comcast", and declared it "a disturbing situation". This led to "memos ... flying from one jittery Comcast executive to another". Nolan subsequently sued Comcast for wrongful termination, and lost. In response to a question raised as part of that suit, Comcast wrote that "… Mr. Nolan’s protest at the NATAS Award Ceremony and of William O’Reilly as the recipient of the Governor’s Award jeopardized and harmed the business and economic interests of Comcast in connection with its contract with Fox News Channel, and its contract negotiations with Fox News that were ongoing at the time." In an extensive review of Mr. Nolan's case for the Columbia Journalism Review in August, the writer Terry Ann Knopf asserted that Mr. Nolan's firing reflected the "corrosive influence of over-concentrated corporate power".

From January 2009, until January 2011, Nolan served as Communications Director for Joint Economic Committee of Congress. In 2012, Nolan and his wife Garland Waller produced the documentary film, No Way Out But One.

== Filmography ==
=== Film ===
Year	Title	Role	Notes
1986	Maximum Overdrive	Radio Newscaster (voice)	Uncredited
1989	Second Sight	Reporter #3	
1994	In the Army Now	Stu Krieger	
1994	Love Affair	Himself	
1995	Number One Fan	Lieutenant / Interrogator	
1996	The Birdcage	TV reporter	
1996	Independence Day	Himself	
1996	Humanoids from the Deep	Male Reporter #1	Television film
1997	Meet Wally Sparks	Reporter #1	
1998	Shadow of Doubt	Reporter #6	
1998	A Letter from Death Row	Maintenance Man #1	
2016	The Purge: Election Year	Reporter #1	

=== Television ===
Year	Title	Role	Notes
1994	Seinfeld	Reporter	Episode: "The Big Salad"
1995	The Mommies	Himself	Episode: "Who Am I?"
1995	The Larry Sanders Show	Newscaster (voice)	Episode: "The Bump"
1995	Dweebs	TV Reporter	Episode: "The Bad P.R. Show"
1997	JAG	Male News Reporter	Episode: "Jinx"
1999	Sabrina the Teenage Witch	Host	Episode: "Mrs. Kraft"
2007	Desperate Housewives	Male News Anchor	Episode: "Something's Coming"
