= Garland Waller =

- Education: Boston University; University of Virginia
- Occupation: Filmmaker
- Partner: Barry Nolan

Garland Waller is a documentary film producer and an assistant professor at Boston University in the College of Communications Department of Television and Film. She began making documentaries while working at WBZ-TV in the 1980s, including Rape: An Act of Hate, narrated and hosted by Veronica Hamel.

Waller received her BS from the University of Virginia and her MS from Boston University.

== Career ==
Her first independent documentary was Small Justice: Little Justice in America's Family Courts on the subject of child and family courts. This was released in 2001.

Her second feature-length documentary, No Way Out But One, tells the story of Holly Collins, the first American to be granted asylum by the government of the Netherlands as a result of domestic violence. Waller created the documentary in 2012 with her husband, and it won the Distinguished Service Award for Excellence in the Media from IVAT, an Accolade Award of Excellence and a Telly Award, and an Indie Award of Merit.

In 2018, she produced and released The Silent Soldier and the Portrait, a documentary inspired by her 95 year old father that tells one veteran's story of surviving tragedy in WWII and his personal journey to set things right. The film won several awards and honors and was an official selection of Hague Global Film Festival. Boston based Film and Television Critic Joyce Kulhawik called it "An exquisitely intimate tale of war, redemption, and family seen through the eyes of a filmmaker who helped her dad lay his ghosts to rest. As it unfolds, Waller’s film holds us gently in the sweep of our own personal histories as we each make our peace."

Waller appeared in Michelle Cove’s 2011 documentary film Seeking Happily Ever After.

She is a public speaker on the subject of domestic violence and has presented to the National Coalition Against Domestic Violence, the Battered Mothers Custody Conference, the National Alliance of Professional Psychology Providers, the Campaign for Commercial-Free Childhood Summit and the Domestic Violence and Child Custody Forum in New Jersey. She is also part of the Children's Justice Campaign.

Waller has co-authored a children’s book, Drawing Angels Near, contributed an essay to Disorder in the Courts and wrote a chapter titled The Yuck Factor, The Oprah Factor, and the 'Stickness' Factor: Why the Mainstream Media Hasn't Covered Family Court Injustice for the reference book Domestic Violence, Abuse, and Child Custody: Legal Strategies and Policy Issues.

== Personal life ==
Waller is married to journalist Barry Nolan.
