= Evening Magazine =

- Also known as: PM Magazine (for non Group W-owned stations, except KING-TV or WWOR)
- Country of origin: United States
- No. of seasons: 16 for original San Francisco series; ongoing for Seattle
- No. of episodes: 2,652 for San Francisco

Production
- Running time: 30 minutes

Original release
- Release: August 9, 1976 – August 30, 1991

Evening Magazine is the name of various news and entertainment-style local television shows in different markets in the United States.

== Concept ==
On August 9, 1976, Westinghouse (Group W) Broadcasting-owned KPIX in San Francisco debuted a locally-produced magazine program called Evening: The MTWTF Show, changing the name to Evening Magazine within a few years. The award-winning series ran for 14 years. It was also the first non-primetime series to be shot entirely on videotape. The series dealt with lifestyles, leisure time, pop culture, famous people, fascinating places, consumer tips and information about modern city living.

KPIX's Evening Magazine was first hosted by San Francisco radio personality Jan Yanehiro, journalist Steve Fox and Detroit news anchor and reporter Erik Smith. Yanehiro stayed with the series throughout its original run, while Fox stayed for three years and Smith for only the first 13 weeks. Smith had come from WXYZ-TV in Detroit, Michigan and returned there, becoming the anchor of that station's weekday morning newscast. The original KPIX version would go on to air more than 3,000 episodes.

Richard Hart joined the series after Steve Fox left and stayed until the "final" episode in 1989. Jan Yanehiro was then joined by Loren Nancarrow and Mike Jerrick for a rebooted series titled Evening, which was later renamed Evening Magazine. This continuation ran for a little over 200 episodes.

In the late 1980s, Joe Montana and his wife Jennifer served as special guest hosts, hosting segments from around the country, the San Francisco Bay Area, and Disney World.

The original San Francisco version was so popular, Group W decided to export the Evening Magazine format to its other owned-and-operated stations. When Group W decided to expand the format to stations outside of their group, the existence of another locally produced program in Seattle (where Group W did not own a TV station), already named Evening Magazine, prompted them to create an alternate name for the national roll-out—PM Magazine.

== Seattle ==
The current Evening Magazine that airs in the Seattle area is still produced to this day by Tegna-owned NBC affiliate KING-TV. It launched on that station on August 25, 1986, with original hosts Brian Tracey and Penny LeGate. The show currently airs at 7:30 p.m. Pacific Time. The show focuses on local people, events, places, and human-interest stories. When Evening Magazine / PM Magazine was still on the air nationwide, KING would use some stories from the national feed for their own Evening.

The show's longtime host, John Curley, emotionally signed off for the last time on April 23, 2009, after hosting nearly 4,000 shows over 14 years. On December 9, 2009, former KING 5 Morning News traffic anchor Meeghan Black became the new host of Evening Magazine, while remaining as co-host of Gardening with Ciscoe. The program celebrated its silver anniversary throughout the 2011 season, while Black ended her "Evening" host run in November 2013, when a revolving cast consisting of "Evening" reporters Jim Dever, Saint Bryan, Kim Holcomb, and Michael King took over hosting duties. Although the format continues to evolve, the show's hosts typically present one show each week as a team, then front the other shows for the week as solo hosts, or occasionally in pairs. When hosting as a team, the group also pre-records segments to be used throughout the week, including "Inbox," "WeighIn," and "Raves," which make use of viewer comments and off-the-cuff interactions between the hosts.

Longtime reporter and host Michael King left the program on December 6, 2019; his replacement, former KIRO-TV news anchor and Take 5 host Angela Poe Russell joined the program on March 2, 2020. Her final show was broadcast on Saint Patrick's Day, March 17, 2023. After 16 years with the show, 11 of them spent as a primary host, Holcomb departed Evening on August 2, 2024. Dever wrapped up his 34 years with Evening (12 years as primary host) on March 31, 2025. The current hosting lineup consists of Bryan and multimedia journalist Jose Cedeno.

== Other Group W markets ==
Local versions of Evening Magazine were produced at four other Westinghouse-owned stations. WPCQ-TV (now WCNC-TV) in Charlotte, owned by Westinghouse from 1980 until 1984, was the only Group W station that did not air its own version of Evening Magazine. Then-Jefferson-Pilot Broadcasting-owned WBTV held the Charlotte rights to the franchise and aired it as PM Magazine from September 1979 until November 1990.

=== Baltimore ===
In Baltimore, WJZ-TV's edition of Evening Magazine aired from August 29, 1977 until December 28, 1990. It was hosted initially by Linnea Anderson, Dave Sisson, Tim White, Jeff Pylant, Donna Hamilton and Steve Aveson. Maria Shriver served as a contributor early in her career.

=== Boston ===
Boston's version of Evening Magazine was produced at WBZ-TV, featuring Robin Young and Marty Sender, later hosts and contributors included Sara Edwards, Barry Nolan, Candace Hacey, and Tom Bergeron. It was the first version to be produced outside of San Francisco, premiering on April 18, 1977, and ending on December 17, 1990, with a special entitled "An Evening to Remember," featuring a history of the show, augmented with staff and viewer comments.

=== Philadelphia ===
At KYW-TV in Philadelphia, the hosts included Ray Murray, Larry Angelo and Teresa Brown. Featured contributors included Susie Pevaroff, Nancy Glass, Mary Ann Grabavoy, Jerry Penacoli, Pat Ciarrocchi, and other stars of KYW-TV's Eyewitness News. This edition ran from July 11, 1977 until September 4, 1992, and was the last Evening Magazine version to air on a Westinghouse-owned station.

=== Pittsburgh ===
The Pittsburgh version of Evening Magazine aired on KDKA-TV from August 1, 1977, until October 12, 1990. Hosts included Dave Durian, Donna Hanover, Liz Miles, Jon Burnett and Mary Robb Jackson. Contributors to the show included Bob Kmetz and Dennis Miller (in his first broadcast experience, prior to joining Saturday Night Live).

== KPIX revival ==
A similar show with the same name aired on KPIX (now owned and operated by CBS, which acquired the Evening Magazine and PM Magazine trademarks as part of the purchase of CBS by Westinghouse in 1995) from 1998 to 2005. This one is well known because it was hosted by the now-popular Discovery Channel personality, Mike Rowe. The Bay Area Evening Magazine aired on weeknights prior to Mike Rowe's move to Dirty Jobs. The show was later replaced by Eye on the Bay, which left Rowe's former Evening Magazine co-host, Malou Nubla, on the outs with the TV station. Chuck Barney, the television critic for the Contra Costa Times, said in a March 2006 article:

Turns out Nubla was displeased when Channel 5 (KPIX) scrapped Evening Magazine in favor of Eye on the Bay—a move that diminished her onscreen role. Her contract, however, ran through this month, and she insists she intended to be a good team player and honor it. But then a heated exchange with a station exec (that Nubla says was initiated by the "irate" exec) quickly torpedoed those plans, and she was out of there.
