= 1989 South Florida television affiliation switch =

Series of events tied to two Miami television station sales

Miami–Fort Lauderdale and West Palm Beach television network affiliate switches on January 1, 19891989 South Florida television affiliation switch at a glance
Station	Market	Channel	Affiliation (pre-1989)	Affiliation (post-1989)
WTVJ	Miami–Fort Lauderdale	4	CBS	NBC
WCIX	Miami–Fort Lauderdale	6	Fox	CBS
WSVN	Miami–Fort Lauderdale	7	NBC	Fox
WPEC	West Palm Beach	12	ABC	CBS
WPBF	West Palm Beach	25	Not signed on	ABC
WTVX	West Palm Beach	34	CBS	Independent

On January 1, 1989, six television stations in the Miami–Fort Lauderdale and West Palm Beach, Florida, markets, exchanged network affiliations. The event, referred to in contemporary media coverage as "The Big Switch", was described as "Miami's own soap opera" and at times compared to Dallas and Dynasty because of the lengthy public disputes between multiple parties that preceded it. Approximately three million television viewers in both markets were affected.

The changes were initiated after NBC's January 1987 purchase of WTVJ (channel 4), the market's CBS affiliate. This was the first time that a television network in the United States had purchased an affiliate of one of its competitors; due to existing contractual obligations, WTVJ was taken over by NBC in September 1987 but operated as a CBS affiliate for nearly 16 months. Miami's existing NBC affiliate, WSVN (channel 7), and owner Sunbeam Television protested this transaction, but after Sunbeam president Edmund Ansin failed to come to an affiliation agreement with CBS, CBS purchased the market's Fox affiliate—WCIX (channel 6)—in August 1988, prompting WSVN to join Fox. Due to WCIX's multiple signal and technical deficiencies that prevented them from servicing much of Broward County with a reliable over-the-air signal, West Palm Beach's ABC affiliate WPEC (channel 12) switched to CBS, with existing CBS affiliate WTVX (channel 34) becoming an independent station and WPBF (channel 25) signing on as the new ABC affiliate. WPBF's agreement to join ABC was the first reverse compensation deal in which a station paid a network to affiliate.

The new NBC station, WTVJ, had a mixed ratings performance. On WCIX, CBS struggled in the Miami market for the next six years, with fourth-rated local newscasts despite a major investment in personnel and in additional transmitters to mitigate the coverage issue. Quickly proving to be an influential Fox affiliate, WSVN adopted a tabloid, news-intensive approach that was a ratings success and duplicated in other markets. In West Palm Beach, WPEC picked up many new Broward County viewers for its CBS network programming but failed to lure them to its newscasts or surpass longtime market leader WPTV. WPBF, the new ABC affiliate, found itself a distant third in the news race and ultimately had to renegotiate the payments it had promised to the network. Without a network affiliation, WTVX's value diminished greatly, and its news department folded in August 1989 after months of cutbacks.

== Overview ==
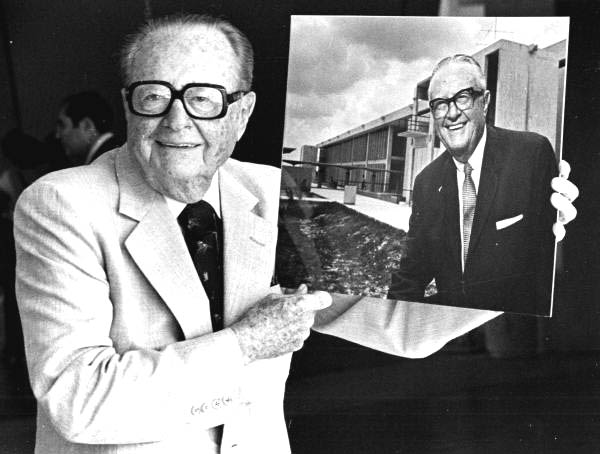
Mitchell Wolfson, founder of WTVJ

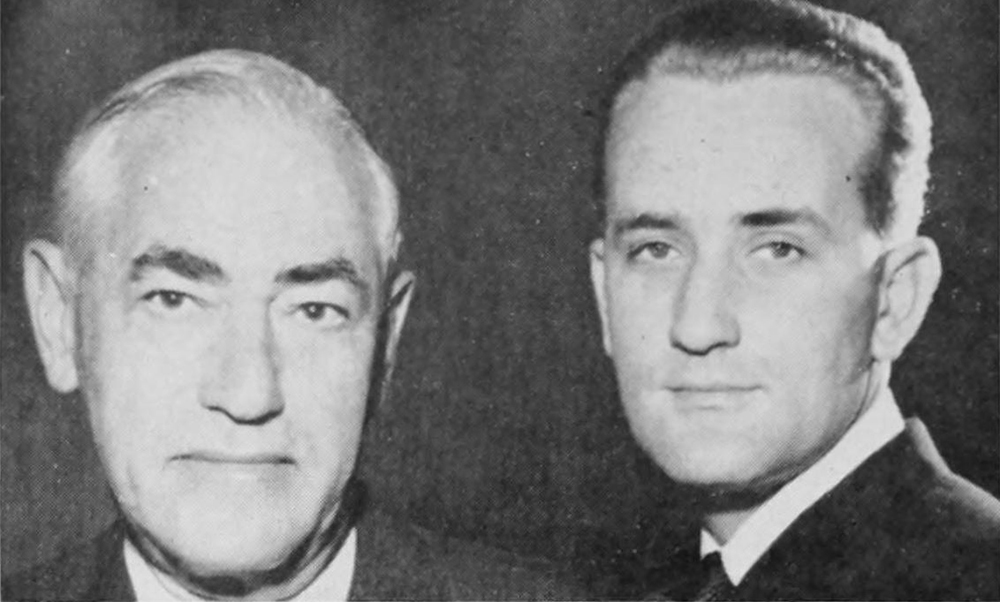
Sidney and Edmund Ansin, founders of Sunbeam Television

Prior to January 1, 1989, the "Big Three" network affiliates in the Miami–Fort Lauderdale television market consisted of WTVJ (CBS), WSVN (NBC), and WPLG (ABC), with WCIX as the market's first full-fledged independent and Fox affiliate.

WTVJ was the first television station to sign on in Florida, having done so on March 21, 1949, on channel 4. As the station signed on after the Federal Communications Commission (FCC) imposed a freeze on issuing television station licenses in September 1948, WTVJ was the only station to operate in Miami for nearly four years. Owned by Wometco Enterprises, a movie theater chain with diversified interests headed by Mitchell Wolfson, WTVJ was a primary CBS affiliate but also carried programming from DuMont, ABC, and NBC during this period. Initially, the remaining networks were represented by ultra high frequency (UHF) stations: WITV took the DuMont and ABC affiliations and WFTL-TV took the NBC affiliation when they signed on in 1953. WTVJ's first 34 years of broadcasting were characterized by unusual levels of stability, led primarily by Wolfson's stewardship of Wometco; its CBS affiliation; and Ralph Renick, the station's founding news director, lead anchor, and personal friend of Wolfson.

At channel 7, WSVN was originally WCKT, which signed on in 1956 as the second full-time NBC affiliate in Miami and owned by Sunbeam Television since 1962. (Note: The current WSVN license dates back to Sunbeam being awarded a license to replace the first WCKT, which was revoked by the FCC in 1962; Sunbeam purchased the assets of the first WCKT and retained all personnel.) Sunbeam was founded in 1953 by real estate developer Sidney Ansin and his son Edmund, with the family's interest in broadcasting dating back to when Sidney sold land to Wolfson for WTVJ's tower. Both were heavily involved in WCKT's operations but largely eschewed any meaningful on-air presence. When Sidney died in 1971, Edmund took over as president of Sunbeam; like his father, Edmund asserted himself as a real estate developer, particularly in the Indianapolis metropolitan area. WCKT took the WSVN call sign in June 1983. WPLG was the market's third ABC station and the second to operate on channel 10; it signed on as WLBW-TV in 1961, replacing WPST-TV, and had been owned by Post-Newsweek Stations since 1969.

WTVJ and WCIX's Grade A signal contours as they existed in the early 1990s. WTVJ (red), located between Miami and Fort Lauderdale, provided primary coverage from Boca Raton in the north to Goulds in the south. WCIX (blue), to Miami's southwest, did not adequately reach populous areas in Broward County north of Fort Lauderdale–Hollywood International Airport.

The channel 6 allocation in Miami was first proposed by the FCC in 1956, providing a brief reprieve for a struggling WITV, which lost the ABC affiliation to WPST-TV and folded shortly thereafter. The proposal was met with confusion among Miami television officials, as the FCC had already assigned the same channel to Orlando, where it was in use by WDBO-TV. Channel 6 in Miami had to have a transmitter located much further south than the other stations in order to meet the minimum spacing of 220 miles (350 km) from WDBO-TV; its transmitter was located in Homestead, with a limited tower height to accommodate a nearby Air Force base. When WCIX-TV took to the air in September 1967, its tower placement resulted in many areas north of Fort Lauderdale and Broward County not receiving an acceptable signal, which the station addressed by signing on UHF translators throughout Broward, Boca Raton, and Hallandale. General Cinema Corporation purchased WCIX in 1968 and became the theater chain's sole broadcast asset to turn a profit. Taft Broadcasting acquired the station via a 1982 trade. Long the market's only full-time general independent, WCIX was challenged by the emergence of two UHF competitors, WDZL (channel 39) in 1982 and WBFS-TV (channel 33) in 1984, with WBFS tying WCIX in local ratings by March 1986. WCIX became a charter Fox affiliate in October 1986.

Wolfson died of a heart attack on January 28, 1983, which came after two heart attacks the previous February that fueled concern among financial circles about Wometco's financial health. Contrary to Wolfson's repeated prior insistence of a "secret plan" so Wometco could never be taken over or sold off, no such succession plan was ever found or mentioned in his will, and no one was designated as a succeeding chairman. In fact, Wolfson was the largest stockholder in Wometco at the time of his death. Some believed Wolfson intended to have his family decide the company's future, while others felt his "secret plan" was simply never to leave.

== KKR takes over Wometco and Storer ==
After approving several measures in a shareholders meeting designed to prevent a hostile takeover, the Wolfson family and Wometco board sold the company to merchant banker Kohlberg Kravis Roberts & Co. (KKR) on September 21, 1983, in a $1 billion leveraged buyout. At the time, it was both the largest corporate transaction in Florida history and a record for a leveraged buyout. While Wometco still existed after the buyout was completed on April 13, 1984, the company was taken private and split into two entities: one based around the television station licenses and Wometco Home Theater and the other centered around the theater chain, Miami Seaquarium, bottling, and cable television divisions. The majority of the latter's assets were sold to a Wometco executive, while the bottling operations were sold separately. With the loss of support from Wolfson and having been stripped of most internal managerial power by KKR, Ralph Renick resigned from WTVJ on April 10, 1985, to pursue a bid for governor of Florida; Renick's 6 p.m. newscast had been consistently rated number one in the market, often by significant margins, from July 1950 until the November 1984 sweeps.

KKR then acquired Storer Communications in another leveraged buyout engineered to thwart a liquidation of that company by dissatisfied shareholders and to prevent a hostile takeover by Comcast. Completed in December 1985, approval by the FCC was contingent on KKR divesting either Storer's cable systems in Miami and Wometco's cable systems in Atlanta, or WTVJ and Storer's WAGA-TV, within 18 months to satisfy cross-ownership rules. While Storer and Wometco remained nominally separate companies, the FCC recognized KKR as the primary owner of both. KKR opted on April 25, 1986, to retain the Storer cable system and put WTVJ on the market with a deadline of May 1, 1987, to make a sale. Wometco's cable systems were also divested.

== Attempted sale of WTVJ to Lorimar ==
I wonder if I have to wear cowboy boots to work now... I was totally surprised. I never heard the name Lorimar mentioned around the station. I heard network, and I heard other big broadcasting companies named, but not Lorimar.

— Alan Mendelson, WTVJ reporter, on news of the station's proposed sale to Lorimar-Telepictures (producers of the CBS soap opera Dallas)

One anonymous Wometco staffer told The Miami Herald that several broadcast networks showed an interest in WTVJ, with a CBS official identifying Miami as one of eight "Sun Belt" markets for future acquisitions. A revision to the Herald story revealed that NBC also made an inquiry about the station, but that network's executives were not available for comment. KKR had originally intended to sell off WTVJ by itself and had rejected a $350 million offer by CBS in the process, but it soon fielded inquiries about including some of the Storer stations in a potential sale.

Television and film production and syndication company Lorimar-Telepictures emerged as the buyer of WTVJ—along with Storer stations WAGA-TV, WITI, WJBK, WJW-TV, WSBK-TV and KCST—in a $1.85 billion group deal announced on May 21, 1986. WTVJ, including the studio building and surrounding land, was itself sold for $405 million. Also included was Storer's program production company, advertising sales division and Washington news bureau. A KKR representative said the firm stood "to make a bundle" and that Lorimar-Telepictures, unlike KKR, had the resources to do more with the stations. Lorimar-Telepictures was not a stranger to broadcast station ownership, already owning five television stations inherited from predecessor Telepictures and having made concurrent offers to purchase WPGH-TV in Pittsburgh and WTTV in Bloomington, Indiana, serving Indianapolis.

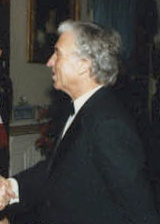
Merv Adelson

Lorimar founder Merv Adelson and associate Irwin Molasky found themselves the subject of scrutiny via a September 15, 1986, profile in The Wall Street Journal that detailed their past ties to several organized crime figures including Moe Dalitz, Allard Roen and Allen Dorfman, even though Adelson and Molasky were never implicated in any unlawful behavior. The deal also faced opposition from both the Cleveland chapter of NABET and a group of minority Wometco shareholders, but Lorimar-Telepictures president Alan Bell expressed confidence those disputes would be resolved.

The June 7, 1986, edition of The Palm Beach Post added another wrinkle: TV critic Bob Michals reported on rumors of a possible affiliation swap between WPEC (channel 12), West Palm Beach's ABC affiliate, and WTVX (channel 34), a UHF station and CBS affiliate based in Fort Pierce. WTVX had gone on the air in 1966 and initially primarily covered the Treasure Coast area. However, WTVJ continued to be the CBS affiliate of record for the Palm Beaches for more than a decade after channel 34 signed on; when that station opened a news bureau in West Palm Beach in 1970, 12.4 percent of its audience was said to come from Palm Beach County. In 1980, WTVX built a new transmitting facility with a more southerly location. Its signal covered Palm Beach County for the first time, and the county's cable systems added WTVX to their lineups. WTVX general manager Lynwood Wright asserted no one from either network had been in contact with him, while Michals expressed puzzlement over CBS wanting to risk hurting WTVJ's ratings by having WPEC join the network, saying, "[T]he only question I have with the swap is why?"

== The first CBS–WCIX courtship ==
On October 22, 1986, Lorimar-Telepictures asked to exclude WTVJ from the deal, which KKR agreed to. This was initially attributed to Lorimar having issues financing the deal, a weak advertising climate in Miami, and reduced cash flow estimates for WTVJ that would have made it impossible to cover interest serviced on $2 billion in high-yield bonds raised by Adelson. The $405 million price was nearly 21 times WTVJ's cash flow while typical station purchase prices were 10 to 14 times cash flow, causing financial markets to believe Lorimar grossly overpaid.

A few days later, The Miami Herald reported that Lorimar backed away from WTVJ after learning CBS inquired with Taft Broadcasting about purchasing WCIX for as much as $125 million, which risked forcing WTVJ to become an independent with a drastically reduced valuation. CBS's interest in WCIX centered around wanting to purchase a Sun Belt station for a fraction of WTVJ's asking price, even with WCIX's technical deficiencies. The inquiry ended when Laurence Tisch, who took over as network chairman on September 10, 1986, expressed worry over a station switch depressing the already slumping national ratings of the CBS Evening News. WTVJ general manager Alan Perris later claimed Tisch objected to Lorimar, who produced Dallas, Knots Landing and Falcon Crest for the network, wanting to purchase a significant portion of the affiliate base and threatened to disaffiliate all of the CBS stations in the deal. Taft, which was itself undergoing a corporate restructuring, sold WCIX along with four other independent stations to the TVX Broadcast Group for a combined $240 million the following month; per a report in Electronic Media, CBS was still allowed to make an offer on WCIX while that transaction was taking place.

We had a sign out on our front lawn saying 'We'd like to purchase a TV station in a top 20 market. Please call this number if you have such a station to sell.' The fact one network had never bought another's affiliate in a hundred years was just a function of, well, not doing it.

— Bob Wright, NBC chairman

Following Lorimar's withdrawal, KKR still valued the station between $250 million and $300 million. Perris, who was also a WTVJ shareholder, later explained that the station needed to be sold for at least $270 million in order for everyone to break even and that any offer less than that would result in him and the other shareholders owing money to KKR. CBS's offer to buy WTVJ for $170 million was thus deemed unacceptable; the network claimed that much of the station's profits came from frequently preempting network programming. KKR then offered WTVJ to both Capital Cities/ABC Inc. and NBC parent company General Electric (GE), under the belief a competing network would not have their bids affected by a CBS disaffiliation threat, internally referred to as "that Channel 6 card". ABC declined the offer, but rumors of interest in WTVJ by NBC quickly emerged. Negotiations were purposefully kept hidden over the next few weeks in an effort to prevent Laurence Tisch from knowing anything in advance.

== NBC purchases WTVJ ==
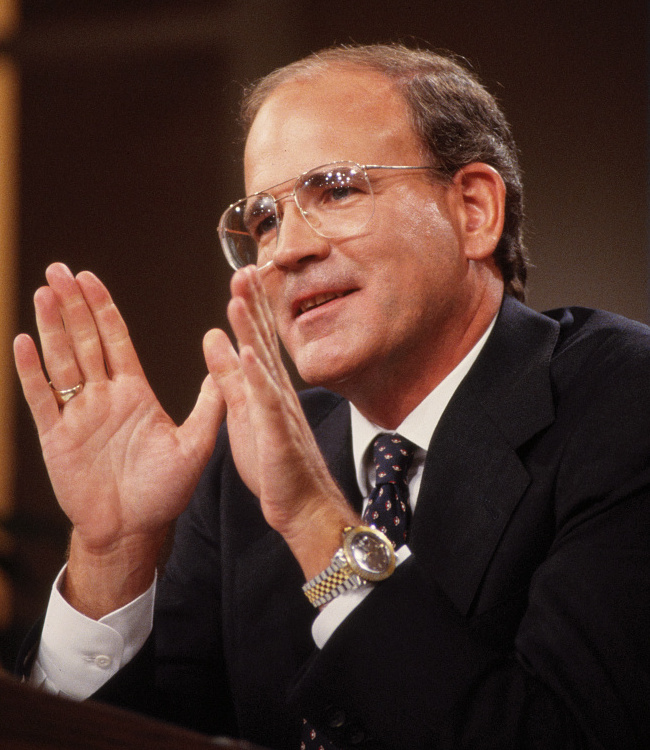
Bob Wright

On January 16, 1987, KKR agreed to sell WTVJ to the General Electric Property Management Co. for $270 million, a markdown of $135 million from Lorimar's prior purchase agreement. Even though a GE holding company was credited as the buyer, it was universally accepted in the media and the industry that NBC was the pending owner. For the first time in the history of North American television, a broadcast network directly purchased an affiliate of a competing network. NBC chairman Bob Wright attributed the uniqueness of the purchase to a relaxation in FCC regulations that increased the number of stations one company could own. CBS was conducting a meeting of its board of affiliates in the U.S. Virgin Islands when the news broke, resulting in none of the company's executives being available for comment. Wright called Tisch, who was playing tennis, to tell him the news, saying, "[H]e was very gracious ... we didn't get into it in any detail, but I think he was surprised."

NBC president Raymond Timothy and vice president Pierson Mapes were tasked by Wright to inform Ed Ansin of the WTVJ purchase in what Mapes later regarded as one of the worst moments of his career. Notified shortly before noon, Timothy recounted Ansin saying "You Expletive Deleted" at the news but honored a prior invite to lunch at a seafood restaurant on the 79th Street Causeway, picking up the tab. After returning to the WSVN studios, Ansin pointed at a satellite dish used to receive NBC programming and deadpanned to Timothy and Mapes, "Why don't you take it home on the airplane?" Ansin later described his reaction as "bewilderment", telling Timothy and Mapes it was "bizarre and certainly unprecedented".

Ed was a perfect gentleman. He was upset, sure, but he's a class act. He said, 'You Expletive Deleted' — with a smile.

— Ray Timothy, NBC president, on when Ed Ansin found out about the network's purchase of CBS affiliate WTVJ

No formal announcement was made to the WSVN staff that day beyond a terse internal memorandum, with some staffers admitting to checking job openings in Broadcasting magazine amid a combination of anxiety and gallows humor. One unidentified WSVN manager described it as a difficult day because they also had to report the story on their evening newscasts. Ansin disclosed in a WSVN interview that GE executives previously made an offer to purchase the station, which he rejected; Mapes told The Miami News that NBC preferred to buy WSVN, but it was not available. The following Monday, Ansin called an internal staff meeting, offering a pep talk and vote of confidence, and told everyone to proceed with "business as usual."

The situation was anything but usual, as industry and media speculation started over where the CBS affiliation would move to and when it would take place. NBC signed a two-year contract extension with WSVN until January 1989, 15 days before they agreed to purchase WTVJ, while WTVJ's existing contract with CBS ran until April 1988. While it was suggested WTVJ could operate as an independent for an interregnum period if CBS were to purchase WCIX and move network programming there, most speculation revolved around WSVN linking with CBS in a simple exchange between the two stations. NBC committed to honor WSVN's existing contract, but Ansin voiced concerns NBC could create a competitive disadvantage by owning WTVJ yet operating it as a CBS affiliate for two years, an arrangement without precedent.

== Sunbeam formally protests ==
With WCIX's sale to TVX still pending, CBS expressed renewed interest in the station, telling the Herald they had been "talking to [Taft] for some time", which was interpreted as the network either indicating a WSVN affiliation was not possible or making a threat to pressure Ansin. During WSVN's 6 p.m. newscast on March 10, 1987, Ansin announced he would protest the WTVJ sale, citing "anti-competitive overtones ... adverse to the public interest". Assisted by former WSVN operations manager and attorney Allen Sternberg, Ansin retained former FCC commissioner Charles D. Ferris as his lead representation and reached out to Rep. Dante Fascell and Sen. Lawton Chiles for additional lobbying. Ansin likened the transaction to the extortion-driven 1956 asset swap between NBC and Group W for stations in Cleveland and Philadelphia the commission overturned nine years later. In a subsequent interview, Ansin said his bitterness with NBC was because the network discarded decades of loyalty from WSVN, especially in the late 1970s when NBC was mired in third place.

Ansin's petition to deny alleged NBC could induce WTVJ to liberally preempt popular CBS shows for lower-rated syndicated programming, disenfranchising Miami television viewers. WTVJ's general manager Alan Perris rejected such a scenario, even though prior to the sale, WTVJ declined to carry CBS News Sunday Morning, which WPLG aired instead. Even with NBC's commitment to honor the balance of the WSVN contract, Ansin claimed the network damaged WSVN's status among programmers and advertisers to the benefit of WTVJ. Ansin publicly expressed his want to keep WSVN as a network affiliate under his stewardship, eventually passing control to his children; when asked about the possibility of WSVN becoming an independent station, Ansin replied, "that's not good... I don't think it'll happen." One Wall Street analyst suggested that Ansin's objections really centered around the risk of losing untold millions of dollars if WSVN failed to secure a network affiliation and had little to do with the sale itself.

When TVX's purchase of WCIX was completed in late March 1987, TVX president Tim McDonald told the News his company was committed to operating WCIX and was not offering it for sale, forcing CBS to negotiate with Ansin by default. The FCC also approved the sale of WTVJ to GE on September 17, 1987, even after Sen. Chiles introduced an appropriations bill amendment requesting a full hearing on the sale by the FCC. Ferris also acknowledged he held doubts about the FCC being receptive to Sunbeam's petition. As WTVJ's CBS affiliation was set to end in April 1988, both networks agreed to extend the CBS contract on a two-week basis for as long as was deemed necessary.

== Preemptions and scheduling chaos ==
The horror story I lived through, no one will ever know until I write my memoirs. We couldn't compete in an era when we had to. At the same time, CBS was going into the toilet.

— Alan Perris, former WTVJ general manager, upon his resignation

Despite the FCC's approval, the concern raised in Ansin's petition of NBC using WTVJ to undermine CBS's standing in the market was realized. WTVJ soon began liberal preemptions of the CBS lineup for syndicated shows such as the Stacy Keach miniseries Hemingway, which displaced CBS programming over three consecutive nights in late April 1988. The airing of Hemingway in particular preempted the second half of a two-part Newhart episode and a Hallmark Hall of Fame installment, the latter of which instead aired after the Sunday late news. Also preempted was a remake of I Saw What You Did written by Cuban exile and Miami native Cynthia Cidre in favor of a re-airing of the 1984 TV movie He's Not Your Son; WTVJ's program director claimed that they were unaware of Cidre's local ties until after making the schedule change. In turn, CBS initially declined to invite WTVJ general manager Dick Lobo—recently transferred to the station from Chicago's WMAQ-TV after Alan Perris's resignation—to the network's 1988 affiliate convention; he was invited after three attempts to reach the network directly.

The scheduling brinksmanship was not limited to CBS fare; in response to WPLG acquiring the rights to A Current Affair, WTVJ moved Wheel of Fortune to 7:30 p.m. directly opposite Jeopardy! on WPLG for the summer months, taking advantage of a prior contract which did not include a provision that the two King World-distributed game shows could not be scheduled against each other. The sales department for WTVJ poked fun of the situation in a promotional video made for prospective advertisers showing a master control employee drinking from an NBC-branded coffee mug while watching a CBS News broadcast and a zoom-in of the NBC peacock that revealed the CBS eye logo. Alan Perris defended his stewardship of the station after resigning, calling it a "horror story" in which WTVJ could not compete and CBS's ratings were suffering a downturn nationally.

== The WSVN–CBS impasse ==
We're dealing here with a very unusual situation. A man with strong opinions. Set in his ways. And with a lot of pride. He couldn't get over [the NBC snub]. It was the damndest thing. He'd go on and on about it. He was personally hurt by the whole experience with NBC and couldn't forget it.

— Tony Malara, CBS affiliate relations director, on the network's negotiations with Ed Ansin

CBS's growing discomfort was compounded by negotiations with Ansin failing to progress, even with conventional wisdom suggesting a WSVN-CBS affiliation was the most likely outcome. The impasse centered around Ansin's insistence a CBS contract be effective on January 1, when WSVN's NBC contract was to end. Ansin's unwavering date was due to NBC's commitments with the 1988 Summer Olympics, the 1988 World Series, and a majority of Miami Dolphins football games because of the network's AFC broadcast rights. Tony Malara, CBS's affiliate relations division president, insisted CBS was deeply distressed at having to remain on a station controlled by NBC; WSVN general manager Bob Leider countered such distress was never mentioned by CBS during the negotiations, and Ansin insisted CBS had agreed to his timeframe, which Malara denied. Ansin made arrangements to fly to New York City on April 26 to sign a CBS contract at Black Rock when Malara called off the meeting, citing that they were reaching out to other parties regarding a purchase or affiliation. Malara said to Ansin the trip was pointless if he would not waver off of the January 1 date.

One week after the negotiations broke down, Ansin filed a United States antitrust lawsuit against NBC, CBS and the GE subsidiary that held WTVJ's license alleging collusion between the networks over WTVJ's sale with intent to cause WSVN "irreparable injury", which Alan Perris dismissed as a mere "fishing expedition." An additional letter of protest sent by Ansin to NBC charged that WTVJ was supplying stories to NBC News, with their Miami news bureau dealing exclusively with WTVJ. Initially bolstered by a verdict that awarded $3.5 million in damages to the owner of a former ABC station in Springfield, Missouri, after Capital Cities/ABC disaffiliated them—which was later thrown out on appeal—Ansin insisted the lawsuit would not hurt WSVN's chances regarding a network contract even though talks between him and CBS never resumed.

The uncertainty at WSVN was not limited to the CBS impasse. News director David Choate abruptly resigned in December 1987; his replacement, Joel Cheatwood, came to Miami from WEWS-TV in Cleveland, where he had been that station's assistant news director. Cheatwood took the job under assurances that WSVN would remain a network affiliate under Sunbeam ownership in what he called a "blood oath" by Ansin. By that March, WSVN's newscasts started to take a more hard-hitting tone, ostensibly to make the station more palatable to a CBS affiliation, while multiple staffers were either dismissed or resigned. Some also left WSVN directly due to the affiliation uncertainty, including both sports director Bret Lewis and weekend sports anchor Doug Vaughn. By happenstance, Lewis and anchor Jill Beach left to take jobs with NBC: Lewis went to KNBC-TV in Los Angeles, while Beach went to WKYC-TV in Cleveland, which at the time was a higher-ranked market than Miami. Lewis's replacement, Jim Berry, took the job assuming WSVN would remain a network affiliate, viewing the distinction as "a sign of privilege" and "like a badge".

== Turmoil at TVX ==
Even with TVX president Tim McDonald's prior insistence WCIX was not for sale, it and the other Taft independents proved too challenging for a company founded with smaller-market stations at its core. Salomon Brothers provided financing for the Taft purchase and, in return, held more than 60 percent ownership of the company. Moreover, the Taft purchase agreement was made 21 days before Grant Broadcasting System, owner of WBFS-TV, filed for Chapter 11 bankruptcy protection as the result of excessive spending for syndicated programming and a softening advertising market. With the exception of WTAF-TV in Philadelphia, the other stations were seen as poorly-performing in their respective markets, WCIX included. WTAF-TV and WCIX also became the only stations in TVX's portfolio to have local newscasts.

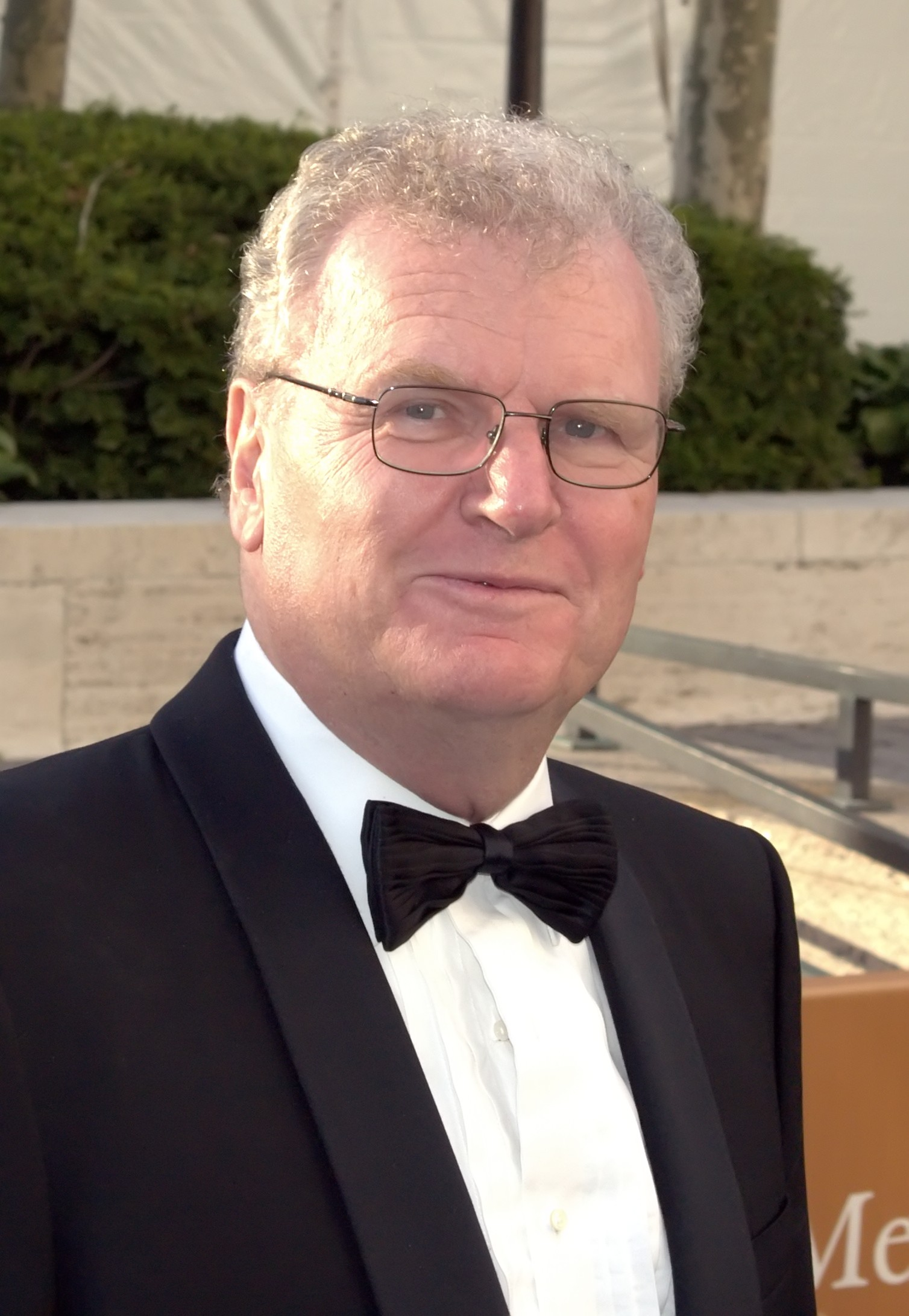
Howard Stringer

The company was to pay Salomon Brothers $200 million on January 1, 1988, and missed the first payment deadline, having been unable to lure investors to its junk bonds even before the Black Monday stock market crash in October 1987. McDonald resigned as TVX president in May 1988 and was succeeded by co-founder John Trinder. Shortly thereafter, TVX sold off its stations in Little Rock and Nashville. With Salomon Brothers pressuring TVX to dispose of additional assets, Electronic Media reported in late July 1988 that CBS quietly re-entered talks with the banker over WCIX. The News reported on August 5 that CBS News president Howard Stringer, recently promoted to president of CBS's owned-stations division, expected a resolution to the Miami affiliation situation "very soon... probably by next week", while Ansin conceded CBS executives had not been in contact with him since April. WCIX's general manager stated that the network already went too far in the process for it to be just a threat aimed at Ansin.

CBS's intention to purchase a station was also financially motivated. After fending off a hostile takeover attempt by Ted Turner in 1985, CBS was induced to sell KMOX-TV in St. Louis to the original iteration of Viacom for $122.5 million as part of a larger asset disposition plan. With that sale, a tax credit worth "tens of millions of dollars" was claimed on the condition that CBS purchase another TV station by January 1, 1989; the network made an unsuccessful attempt to buy then-independent KPHO-TV in Phoenix earlier in 1988 from the Meredith Corporation. Network executives later denied this had factored directly into their pursuits within the Miami market.

== CBS acquires WCIX ==
Three days after Stringer's interview with the News, CBS finally agreed to acquire WCIX for $59 million on August 8, 1988, a price far below TVX's $90 million valuation of the station two years earlier. Concurrent with this purchase, the network announced that WPEC would also switch affiliations from ABC to CBS at the same time as WCIX, effectively conceding WCIX's multiple technical disadvantages in the Miami market. CBS's purchase of WCIX meant that WSVN would become an independent station at the end of 1988; several Wall Street analysts estimated WSVN's market value dropped by as much as $200 million, with one analyst suggesting the station now had one-third of the cash flow it had while an NBC affiliate. In response, Ansin immediately announced WSVN's news operations would not be contracted but would instead be expanded.

Steve Sonsky of the Miami Herald, critical of Ansin's prior legal battles and continued defiance, wrote:

They're not going to become one of those independents that just runs back-to-back sitcom reruns... but that's the way all indie stations operate—because they've found that without the big original network programming as lead-ins and lead-outs, you just can't compete on the same level. His ratings have to drop. And so his revenues will drop. It's a mystery how he'll continue to pay for the news staff necessary to do three hours a night of local news, and how he'll keep his best newsroom talent. If he pulls it off he'll set the industry on its ear. But somehow you get the feeling that maybe, once again, Ed Ansin just might be fooling himself.

== A West Palm affiliation shuffle ==
In agreeing to affiliate with West Palm Beach's WPEC in an attempt to offset any network coverage losses in Broward, CBS pulled a second media market into the affiliation switch. ABC was placed in the position of searching for a new affiliate among three stations: outgoing CBS affiliate WTVX, West Palm Beach Fox affiliate WFLX (channel 29), and WPBF (channel 25), a station whose studios were under construction in Palm Beach Gardens and which was projected to sign on as an independent.

Conventional wisdom when the WPEC switch to CBS was announced gave WTVX a strong chance of emerging with the ABC hookup; WTVX was the only station with an existing newsroom, and it was the most established of the three. Bob Morford, the news director, told his staff in a memo, "The bottom line for WTVX is that we expect we will become the next ABC affiliate for this market." In September, officials from the three stations made presentations to ABC executives in New York. WTVX was seen as being in the lead, with its existing infrastructure and news operation, but it was not based in West Palm Beach, the largest city in the media market. WFLX had solid ratings and viewership even into Broward County, though it had no news department. WPBF, meanwhile, was cited by media as a "dark horse" and by WPTV's general manager as a "sleeper" because of its proposed technical facilities and the track record of one of its owners, John H. Phipps, in running Tallahassee-area WCTV, one of the most successful television stations in the country.

In October, ABC handed down its decision: it selected WPBF, which had offered to pay the first-ever fee to affiliate with a network in an industry where networks paid stations. A disappointed Morford believed that ABC preferred a new station in the centrally located, high-growth Palm Beaches area to his existing station in Fort Pierce. The very same officials that just two months prior had stated they had "not even contemplated" life without a network now were left with one prospect: independent status. The decision was likewise received with shock by other local television executives and on the national level. Murray Green, general manager of WFLX, called the decision "ludicrous" for awarding the affiliation to a station that was not even broadcasting yet. The precedent-setting reverse compensation deal, which was said to make affiliates of ABC "very nervous", was so unusual that it spurred an editorial in Electronic Media calling the idea of selling affiliations to the highest bidder a "dangerously short-sighted move" with the potential to destabilize the industry.

WTVX's Morford declared the 35-person news staff would remain and that the station would reinforce its commitment to local news. Morford noted that, while movies and syndicated shows would be on the new lineup, "the world does not need another movie channel". WTVX owner Frank Spain put the station on the market in November 1988, trying to gauge its value without a network affiliation; he opted not to take the various offers that ranged from $9 to $24 million—half the $49 million value it had as a CBS affiliate.

Meanwhile, in Palm Beach Gardens, work was accelerated on WPBF. As late as November 10, the studio building was an empty warehouse; equipment had to be ordered and installed and a staff assembled. WPBF's news director started on the job on November 14; he received hundreds of unsolicited audition tapes for anchor and reporter positions.

== WSVN's news and Fox gamble ==
It's an interesting and unique opportunity we've been put in... there is no reason why we can't become a WGN or a WTTG. There's a good chance we could become the No. 1 indie in the country.

— Bob Leider, WSVN general manager

After CBS's purchase of WCIX, Ansin and Leider offered Joel Cheatwood an opportunity to leave due to Ansin's "blood oath" not being fulfilled, but Cheatwood decided to stay on advice from his wife. A majority of personnel present at a subsequent staff meeting also committed to stay. By September, WSVN dropped its NewsCenter 7 branding for Channel 7 News and adopted an aggressive pressroom feel, with its early-evening newscasts reformatted into faster-paced, half-hour formats, a move Cheatwood considered several months earlier. The 11 p.m. newscast would be moved to an hour-long 10 p.m. slot, with anchor Rick Sanchez taking an additional role as a "Crime Check" on-scene reporter. Today and NBC Nightly News would be replaced with an expansion of the station's early-morning local newscast, Today in Florida, and the locally produced news magazine Inside Story, the latter similar in tone to A Current Affair with aspirations to be sold to syndication. WSVN also signed up as a CNN affiliate for national and international news coverage, simulcasting Headline News in the overnight hours.

The station committed to producing 7 1/2 hours of local newscasts on weekdays, gambling that its current audience would not defect to other channels. Such reasoning was not entirely unfounded: due to the increasingly convoluted nature of the affiliation swaps that now encompassed six stations in two adjacent markets, informal polling conducted by WTVJ indicated significant confusion among viewers as to on which stations their favorite network programs would soon be broadcast. This level of news expansion was also attributed to a lack of foresight. Assuming a CBS affiliation was still possible right up to the WCIX sale, WSVN did not acquire a syndicated program inventory comparable to the majority of independent stations, and its program director resigned when the station's independent status was confirmed. Ansin later explained that WSVN had considered itself an appendage of NBC instead of a network affiliate. WSVN quickly acquired local broadcast rights to 650 feature films for a nightly prime time movie showcase at 8 p.m., boasting a library of over 750 titles. Leider noted that over two dozen movie packages meant for over-the-air broadcasters had been previously unclaimed in the market, making the purchases a relatively easy process.

There is a presumption that the only way to program an independent station is with wall-to-wall sitcoms. I don't think that's going to be our approach... we have a tradition and an image we're not going to give up.

— Edmund Ansin

WSVN agreed to carry The Arsenio Hall Show upon its 1989 debut, briefly complicating affiliation negotiations with Fox as the network filed a lawsuit against show distributor Paramount Television; Hall previously hosted Fox's Late Show for a 13-week period. When WSVN finally announced an agreement with Fox, the network only programmed in weekend prime time, allowing the station to bill itself as an independent. In a marked contrast to its weekday schedule, WSVN programmed like a conventional independent on the weekends with a mix of cartoons, syndicated professional wrestling, off-network reruns and movies, in addition to Fox programming and half-hour newscasts at 6 p.m. and 10 p.m.

WSVN's plans, unheard of for any television station in the United States, were ridiculed and pilloried in the local media. Conventional wisdom suggested independent stations had to operate with a focus on sitcom reruns and movies because they were unable to compete on the same level with network programming. Up to the switch, WCIX's news output consisted of a single half-hour 10 p.m. newscast raising doubts that four full-time English-language television news operations in a market like Miami could be feasible. Historically, stations that were disaffiliated from a network had their news departments culled back if not eliminated altogether: KMSP-TV in Minneapolis–Saint Paul had been the most successful example of a station and news operation that thrived after being downscaled. The Herald's Steve Sonsky suggested that if WSVN's plans were successful, "a video precedent-shattering event will have taken place here".

== Initiating the switches ==
The FCC approved the sale of WCIX to CBS on October 31, 1988, after The National Black Media Coalition withdrew a legal challenge following a favorable review of TVX's past Equal Employment Opportunity Commission compliance. CBS had to legally wait at least 40 days after FCC approval before assuming operations and did not fully take over WCIX until January 3, 1989, preventing them from making a significant on-air promotional campaign. The network did, however, invest in an outdoor billboard campaign; one billboard for Murder, She Wrote on the South Dixie Highway featured a dagger piercing a numeral "4". Due to the consummation process, the affiliation changes were now slated to take place on January 1, 1989, when WSVN's NBC contract was to end, the date Ansin had preferred and Bob Leider argued made CBS's insistence on an earlier date irrelevant. CBS affiliate relations division president Malara countered by telling the Herald, "... if I had to wait anyway, why should I affiliate with [Ansin]? If I had to wait, screw him. Why not buy an asset?"

WSVN started aggressively marketing itself on-air as "your news station". In one instance, the station promoted its future 10 p.m. newscast directly into an L.A. Law episode that aired at 10 p.m. on Thursday nights. WTVJ's $3 million marketing effort was dubbed "Operation Peacock", using NBC's star talent and centered around a customized recording of the Bobby McFerrin single "Don't Worry, Be Happy". A life-sized cardboard cutout of Bill Cosby was placed in the main lobby of the WTVJ studios. Both WTVJ and WSVN sent literature to advertising clients focusing on WCIX's weak broadcast signal, with WSVN's packet stating "WCIX does not deliver" and touting WSVN's new independent status and news department.

With WSVN, WTVJ, and WCIX all locked into their existing network programming for the rest of 1988, WTVJ picked up NBC's Santa Barbara in advance of the switch; WSVN dropped the soap opera on September 18, 1988, after adding The Judge and Superior Court to its lineup. WTVJ cleared Santa Barbara at 11 a.m. weekdays which initially sent CBS's The Price Is Right to the overnight hours. Owing to the string of temporary contracts CBS had for WTVJ since April, WCIX picked up The Price Is Right, Card Sharks and CBS News Nightwatch in October and Sunday Morning and Face the Nation in December. WSVN also declined to carry Later with Bob Costas when it launched in August; WTVJ ran the program on a tape-delay basis.

The final night of programming prior to the switches had both WSVN and WTVJ broadcasting the King Orange Jamboree Parade; WTVJ's coverage had Sandy Duncan of The Hogan Family as a co-host, while WSVN concurrently ran NBC's coverage, hosted by Joe Garagiola and Marilyn McCoo. Bob Soper co-hosted a lead-in to NBC's parade coverage on WSVN as well as a local New Year's countdown, while WCIX carried CBS's Happy New Year, America after its final night of Fox programming. At 3 a.m., WTVJ interrupted the movie Love and Larceny to air a pre-recorded message from general manager Dick Lobo finally welcoming the station to the NBC network.

== Ramifications ==
Sign-on to sign-off ratings comparison year-over-year for the Miami–Fort Lauderdale market, 1988–1989
Station	Arbitron		Nielsen	
Station	Nov. 1988	Nov. 1989	Nov. 1988	Nov. 1989
WTVJ	5	6	6	6
WCIX	2	4	2	4
WSVN	7	5	7	5
WPLG	8	6	8	7

Prime time ratings comparison year-over-year for the Miami–Fort Lauderdale market, 1988–1989
Station	Arbitron		Nielsen	
Station	Nov. 1988	Nov. 1989	Nov. 1988	Nov. 1989
WTVJ	9	13	9	13
WCIX	4	8	4	8
WSVN	13	8	14	9
WPLG	13	11	14	11

Sign-on to sign-off ratings comparison year-over-year for the West Palm Beach market, 1988–1989
Station	Arbitron		Nielsen	
Station	Nov. 1988	Nov. 1989	Nov. 1988	Nov. 1989
WPTV	8	8	9	10
WPEC	5	5	6	7
WPBF	—N/a	3	—N/a	3
WTVX	3	1	3	1

Prime time ratings comparison year-over-year for the West Palm Beach market, 1988–1989
Station	Arbitron		Nielsen	
Station	Nov. 1988	Nov. 1989	Nov. 1988	Nov. 1989
WPTV	13	16	13	16
WPEC	10	11	11	12
WPBF	—N/a	7	—N/a	7
WTVX	5	2	5	2

=== WTVJ ===
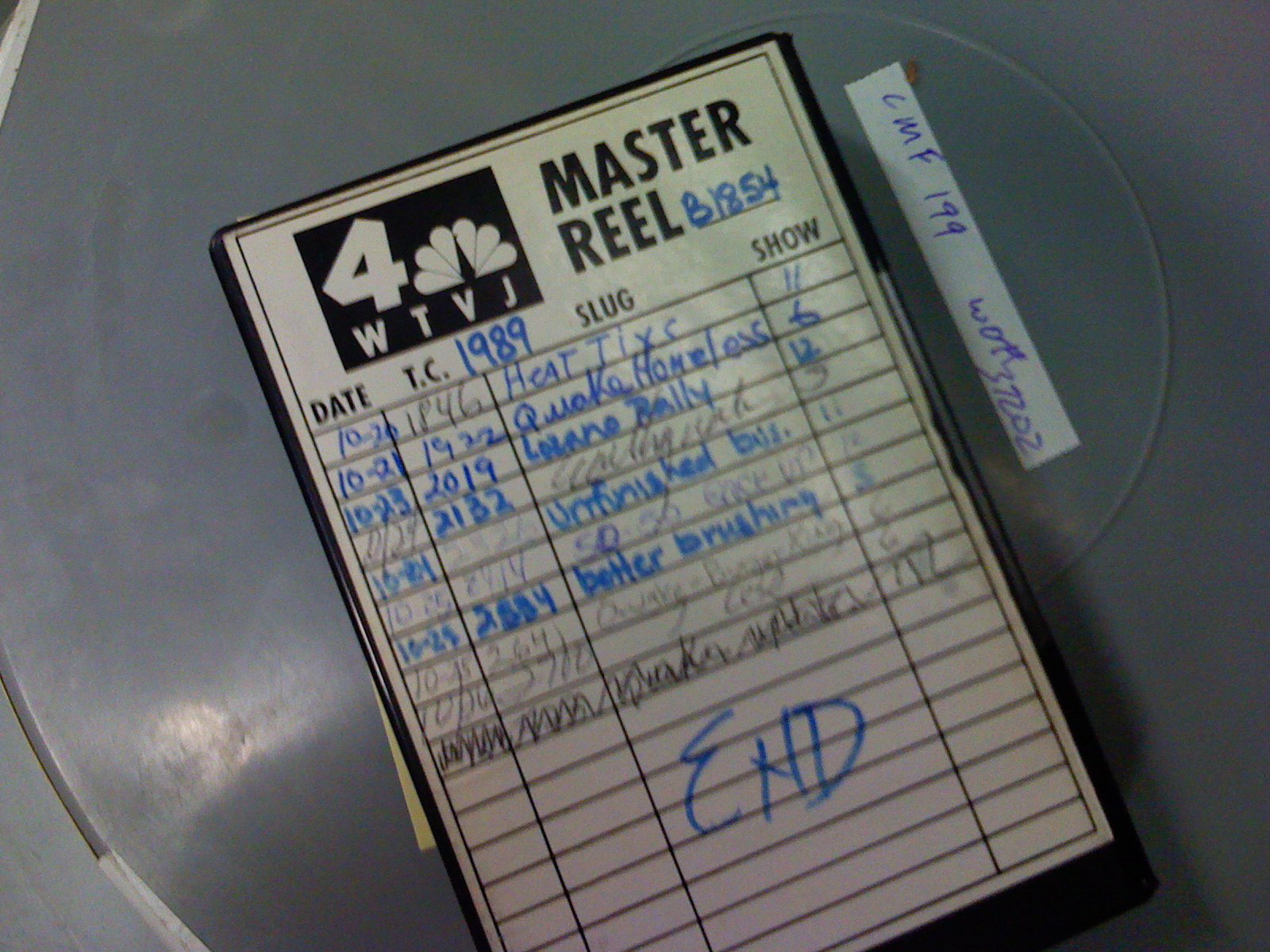
WTVJ archival news tape, 1989.

While WTVJ's marketing campaign for its switch to NBC was centered around the "don't worry, be happy" phrase, South Florida Sun-Sentinel critic Tom Jicha retrospectively wrote, "practically speaking, it was over as soon as it started. The jingle ... never reflected reality ... there has been little to smile about and plenty to fret over." WTVJ's ratings performance following the switch was largely mixed: despite NBC programming creating a halo effect for WTVJ at 11 p.m., the station fell to third place behind WPLG and WSVN in late afternoons, and lead anchor John Hambrick left for WCIX at the end of 1989. Under general manager Dick Lobo's leadership, WTVJ began marketing to the region's Spanish-language communities in efforts Jicha later called "ticklish" and "feverish".

Led by meteorologist Bryan Norcross, WTVJ's coverage of Hurricane Andrew attracted local and industry acclaim but failed to translate into long-term ratings growth. In the February 1993 sweeps, WTVJ's 5 p.m. news ranked behind Geraldo on WCIX in both the Nielsen and Arbitron books. WTVJ started emphasizing crime stories and a tabloid presentation, similar to WSVN; the station also experienced frequent turnover in its lead anchor role, a situation that contrasted with Renick's 35-year tenure as its signature personality. Lobo resigned in late September 1993.

=== WCIX ===
Appraisals of WCIX in the months following the CBS takeover were immediately negative. Laurence Tisch's past concerns of the CBS Evening News rating poorly on WCIX proved correct, as ratings for the Evening News fell by more than half in the first two months. The station continued to operate a local telephone number for any home reception issues, employed a director of cable and viewer relations, and leased a low-power TV station in Pompano Beach to use as a translator later in the year. By July 1989, Howard Stringer called WCIX "a disaster" to local media and stated the station could "never be better than third" due to their signal issues; Stringer also said, "if it [the purchase] had happened six months later, I think I might have been able to talk them out of it." Stringer's "disaster" remark, which was covered on the front page of Variety, prompted Tisch to issue a memo in support of the station. The Homestead tower collapsed due to destructive winds from Hurricane Andrew on August 24, 1992, and was rebuilt over a two-year process. While WCIX operated with reduced power during this period, reception improved dramatically among Broward County residents due to the temporary site being located at the Broward–Dade line, to the extent the rebuilt Homestead tower was considered a technical downgrade.

Despite significant investment into WCIX's news operation under CBS, WCIX ranked fourth among English-language news operations in Miami following the switch, a position that ultimately never changed. An attempt by WCIX to de-emphasize crime stories and violent footage in its newscasts was implemented in May 1994 and proved to be a market failure, with ratings falling by 24 percent year-over-year during the first month.

=== WSVN ===
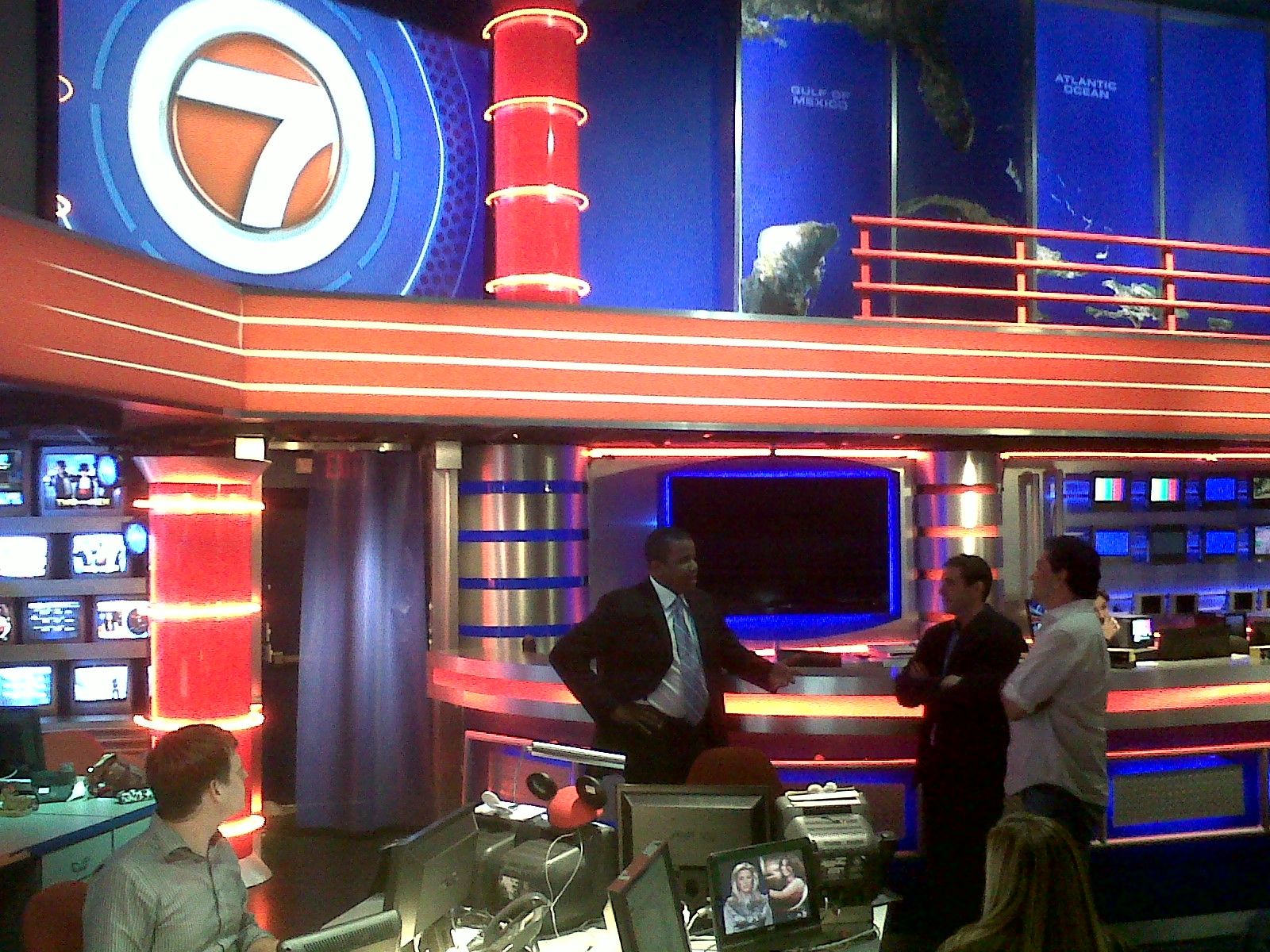
WSVN's newsroom, c. 2010. The station's success with a news-intensive tabloid format since 1989 has heavily influenced other news departments throughout the United States.

As predicted, WSVN's ratings suffered significant declines after losing NBC programming, particularly in prime time. It was WSVN's news operation, however, that attracted industry notice: WSVN's late-afternoon newscasts began outdrawing WTVJ, with Inside Story being picked up for syndication in the fall of 1989. The Sun-Sentinel's Tom Jicha later remarked, "[I]n this case, the conventional wisdom wasn't wise." WSVN's success prompted Fox to hire Joel Cheatwood to oversee development of a network news service, but after Fox put those plans on hold, he returned to WSVN. When Sunbeam purchased WHDH-TV in Boston in 1993, Cheatwood was transferred there to oversee the adoption of a similar tabloid format. Frank Magid consultant Eric Braun likened WSVN's fast-paced stories, flashing graphics, and emotional anchors to be an updated form of the Eyewitness News and Action News formats 20 years earlier and akin to Walter Winchell; Magid also consulted stations on adopting certain elements of the WSVN format.

The phrase "if it bleeds, it leads" (Note: This phrase was initially coined in an October 1989 New York article to describe WABC-TV, which had implemented an equally tabloid style.) came to characterize WSVN and Cheatwood in a 1990 Miami New Times cover story, a 1994 Newsweek article, and a 1993 feature in the New York Times. WSVN's format—sometimes derisively referred to as "new wave news" or "MTV news"—would be copied by other Fox affiliates for their local newscasts and influenced news departments in Sacramento, St. Louis, Chicago, Cleveland, and New York City. By 1994, Fox network president Lucie Salhany hailed WSVN as "the future of television". When Edmund Ansin died on July 26, 2020, he was remembered by Radio & Television Business Report for having overseen what became a "legendary, revolutionary news-driven station". As was Ansin's wishes in 1987, Sunbeam Television was taken over by sons James and Andy Ansin.

=== WPEC ===
Having joined CBS mainly to address WCIX's over-the-air home reception issues in much of Broward County, CBS reportedly paid $5 million over two years to WPEC, consisting of an increase in network compensation payments, $1 million in capital improvements to the transmitter, and promotion expenses. WPEC courted Broward viewers with enhanced news coverage and special antenna deals, and the station reinforced its news presence in the southern part of its market and beyond, bolstering an existing news bureau in Boca Raton and adding one in Fort Lauderdale. A full-time staff of five people was devoted to covering news from Broward. WPEC also established a news bureau in Stuart for the Treasure Coast later in 1989 after WTVX's news department folded.

WPEC experienced substantial ratings increases in Broward County after the switch. In 1988, seven percent of the station's viewers in total-day ratings, and six percent in afternoon and prime time, came from Broward. By February 1989, those figures jumped to 24 percent, 29 percent, and 32 percent, respectively. However, the station found that residents of these areas were watching primarily for network programs and turned to Miami stations for local news, and channel 12 continued to rank behind WPTV in overall ratings. After two years, WPEC formally abandoned targeting Broward viewers for news coverage. WPEC owner Alexander W. Dreyfoos Jr. sold the station to Freedom Communications in 1995.

=== WPBF ===
The sudden change in plans for WPBF reflected in the station's performance over its first few years of operation. Newscasts debuted on the station's second day on-air and ranked in third place behind WPEC and WPTV. Efforts were made to expand the news department beginning in late 1989, but a poor signal in southern Palm Beach County, problems establishing viewer loyalty when some viewers preferred the Miami stations, and the early 1990s recession resulted in WPBF downsizing nearly 30 percent of its workforce through the latter half of 1991 and receiving forgiveness from ABC on some of the affiliation fees. WPBF's fortunes stabilized under Paxson Communications, which bought the station in late 1993. Since 1997, the station has been owned by Hearst Television. Over the course of the 2000s and early 2010s, WPBF edged past WPEC for second place in the West Palm Beach news ratings.

WPBF's reverse compensation deal ultimately heralded the industry trend. The ability of broadcasters to collect retransmission consent payments from cable and satellite providers motivated the networks to seek payment for affiliation, in essence receiving a cut of what stations collected in exchange for providing popular national sports and entertainment programming. By 2012, CBS received an estimated $250 million a year in fees from its affiliates.

=== WTVX ===
Unlike WSVN, WTVX's forced independent status proved to be a liability more than an advantage. Without CBS programming, the station's total-day audience fell by two-thirds and its prime time audience by 60 percent. WTVX also initially moved its 11 p.m. newscast to 10 p.m. but programmed less-popular movies as a lead-in, while its non-news programs attracted a different audience altogether. The station quickly began canceling newscast after newscast (ending up with just 5:30, 6, and 11 p.m. newscasts), while the news staff dropped from 40 to 16 people. Many of the staff that remained began to look for jobs elsewhere. Weekend newscasts were dropped in June, and the news department was eliminated outright on August 4. The three West Palm Beach stations each bought advertising time on WTVX's final broadcast to promote their newscasts.

WTVX owner Frank Spain encountered similar difficulty in selling off the station. A Maryland real estate developer obtained an option to buy WTVX, but no deal was ever reached, and WTVX came off the market for a second time. By April 1990, the station was courting three suitors, and though Frank Spain initially backed out of a planned sale to Krypton Broadcasting, the firm agreed to purchase WTVX for $8 million in September 1990. Krypton's failure to pay a $19 million loan from Dutch bank Internationale Nederlanden Bank N.V. began a series of events culminating with a Chapter 11 bankruptcy filing in 1993, with WTVX owing over $3.3 million to various program suppliers. Whitehead Media, an affiliate of WPBF owner Paxson Communications, purchased the station in a bankruptcy auction the following year.

== The 1995 WTVJ–WCIX channel "trade" ==
WTVJ and WCIX initiated an equally complicated switch in 1995 as part of a larger asset swap between NBC and CBS. After Fox signed an extensive affiliation pact with New World Communications in May 1994, CBS signed a group-wide affiliation agreement with Westinghouse Broadcasting (Group W) that, in the process, displaced the CBS-owned station in Philadelphia, WCAU-TV. NBC prevailed in a bidding war for WCAU-TV, with NBC agreeing to sell to the CBS–Group W partnership KCNC-TV in Denver, KUTV in Salt Lake City, and WTVJ's license and transmitter, and CBS selling to NBC both WCAU-TV and WCIX's license and transmitter. When the asset swap took place on September 10, 1995, WCIX "moved" to channel 4 and was renamed WFOR-TV, operating on WTVJ's former license, with WTVJ "moving" to channel 6, operating on WCIX's former license.

== See also ==
- Media in Miami
- 1994–1996 United States broadcast television realignment
- 2001 Vancouver TV realignment
- 2006 United States broadcast television realignment
- 2007 Canada broadcast TV realignment
- ADS (TV station) and SAS (TV station), two Australian stations which conducted a similar affiliation swap in 1987
