= Ansin =

Ansin is a surname. Notable people with the surname include:

- Edmund Ansin (1936–2020), American television executive
- Toby Lerner Ansin (born 1941), American civic leader, wife of Edmund

== Other uses ==
- Ansin Sports Complex, a multi-sport complex located in Miramar, Florida, U.S.

== See also ==
- Asín (surname)
