= Asin (disambiguation) =

Asin (born 1985) is an Indian actress.

Asin or ASIN may also refer to:

- Arcsine, an inverse trigonometric function
- Asin (band), a Filipino rock band
- Asín (surname)
- Asín, a municipality in Spain
- Asin de Broto, a village in Broto, Spain
- Amazon Standard Identification Number, used by Amazon.com to identify its products
- Asin of Baekje (died 405), king of Baekje
- Asin, Bhamo, Burma
