= Joel Cheatwood =

American television executive

- Born: September 1, 1958 (age 67); Oklahoma City, Oklahoma, U.S.
- Occupations: News director; media executive
- Years active: 1980–present
- Employer: Merit Street (Phil McGraw/TBN)
- Known for: Tabloid journalism
- Television: WSVN (1988–1990, 1991–1997); WHDH (1993–1997); WMAQ-TV (1997–1998); The Glenn Beck Program (2006–2007, 2008–2011); GBTV/TheBlaze (2011–2015)
- Spouse: Neva Cheatwood (m. 1983)
- Children: 2
- Parents: Don C. Cheatwood (father); Eleanor E. Cheatwood (mother)
- Website: cheatwoodmedia.com

Joel Cheatwood (born c. September 1, 1958) is an American television executive and founding chief operating officer for Merit Street Media, a joint venture between Phil McGraw and the Trinity Broadcasting Network. He is best known as the news director for WSVN in Miami, Florida, from 1988 to 1990 and from 1991 to 1997, implementing a highly successful, visually-based tabloid journalism format that has since been emulated and imitated at television stations across the country.

Cheatwood also headed news operations for WMAQ-TV in Chicago when that station briefly employed Jerry Springer as a commentator, and at CNN Headline News and Fox News, oversaw the development of two highly-rated but controversial talk shows, both hosted by Glenn Beck. After Beck's 2011 departure from Fox News, Cheatwood was the founding chief content officer for his streaming media platform, TheBlaze.

== Early life ==
Joel Cheatwood was born in Oklahoma City, Oklahoma, and grew up in Fresno, California. Joel was the only son of Donald and Eleanor Cheatwood, two evangelical ministers that were loosely affiliated with Pentecostal tent meetings, hosted a radio show over area station KBIF, and operated a Christian bookstore in Fresno. Between the ages of 5 and 14, Cheatwood attended these tent meetings, served as an usher and sang with the choir. Cheatwood participated in the California Cadet Corps, and in 1971 was named most outstanding non-commissioned officer in the seventh grade, at the time the youngest student participant to win the award.

In high school, Cheatwood played on the high school baseball team and tried out for the Oakland Athletics and Cleveland Indians.

== Career ==
Cheatwood was interested in newspaper journalism in high school, preferring it over television news, which he held an aversion over. While an undergraduate student at Fresno State from 1978 to 1981, Cheatwood worked for the Fresno Guide as a reporter, first as a sportswriter, then covering the City Hall beat. After the Guide folded in 1980, Cheatwood joined KFSN-TV in Fresno as a news assignment editor. Cheatwood thrived in the immediacy of television, eventually overcoming a frequent migraine and short temper to pursue management roles.

Working as an executive producer for KPIX-TV in San Francisco, Cheatwood joined KMPH-TV in Fresno in late 1983 as a reporter and anchor; within eight months, he was elevated to news director. Between September 1985 and December 1987, Cheatwood worked as news director for WXEX-TV in Richmond, Virginia, and assistant news director for WEWS-TV in Cleveland, Ohio.

=== Tabloid television news ===
Cheatwood was hired as news director for WSVN in Miami, Florida, in January 1988. Then the market's NBC affiliate, WSVN lost the affiliation after NBC bought CBS affiliate WTVJ (channel 4) and CBS purchased Fox affiliate WCIX-TV (channel 6), triggering a complicated series of network affiliation switches on January 1, 1989. With the backing of WSVN owner Sunbeam Television, Cheatwood led the station's relaunch with a visually aggressive tabloid format beginning in September 1988 and a major expansion of newscast production, unheard of in the industry. While these plans were initially ridiculed in local media, WSVN's newscast ratings stabilized and increased throughout 1989, outdrawing WTVJ in multiple time periods. As 1990 began, WSVN was regarded in the industry as a major success story. Cheatwood also oversaw production of local shows for WSVN. Inside Story (later Inside Report) was a news magazine created as a replacement for the NBC Nightly News, the program was a local ratings success and briefly syndicated in the fall of 1989. Sunbeam also launched an in-house production company with Cheatwood as president.

The Fox network, which WSVN affiliated with, hired Cheatwood in early 1990 to oversee the development of a possible network newscast. As part of the deal, Cheatwood was installed as news director for KTTV, Fox's west coast flagship, and oversaw the launch of Personalities, a daily syndicated program hosted by Charlie Rose. Rose resigned as Personalities host after two months amid low ratings and disagreement over the show's direction, later conceding he had never watched Inside Report. After the failure of Personalities, Cheatwood returned to WSVN in March 1991 as vice president of news. Upon his return, a temporary newscast WSVN launched at 7:30 p.m. during the 1991 Persian Gulf conflict was converted to 7:30, an irreverent news magazine that attracted controversy for sensational, lurid topics mixed with cynicism. By January 1996, Cheatwood relaunched 7:30 as Deco Drive, which remains on WSVN today.

WSVN's newscast format attracted industry attention for a large volume of stories all short in length, a strong emphasis on crime, casual verbiage in reporting, video manipulation to show news footage in slow-motion or in black-and-white, and theatrics by the station's anchors. Cheatwood defended the format as a way to counter public perception of newscasts being slow and boring, a belief later echoed by Sunbeam chairman Edmund Ansin. After Sunbeam purchased Boston's then-CBS affiliate, WHDH-TV, for $215 million, Cheatwood was appointed as vice president of news for both stations. WHDH adopted a tabloid format less aggressive than WSVN by comparison, but emerged as a ratings contender in the Boston market by the end of the decade. The WSVN tabloid format proved influential to television newscasts and was widely imitated—either in elements or as a whole—throughout the country, and also served as model for increased news production among current and new Fox affiliates.

=== WMAQ, KYW and WCBS ===
In February 1997, Cheatwood was hired by NBC as vice president of news for WMAQ-TV, the network's owned-station in Chicago, in addition to varied projects for MSNBC and other digital ventures. That May, Cheatwood recruited Jerry Springer as a "news analyst" for WMAQ's 10 p.m. news, an experiment which backfired when lead anchor Carol Marin resigned on-air in protest, followed by co-anchor Ron Magers; Springer was removed after two commentaries. One NBC executive estimated WMAQ lost more than $10 million in advertising revenue over the incident. Cheatwood later claimed Springer's usage as a commentator came after the general manager insisted on having Springer as an anchor; Princell Hair—who was WMAQ's news director under Cheatwood—claimed Springer was presented to him and Cheatwood as a fait accompli. NBC reassigned Cheatwood in May 1998 to head daytime development for the network's owned-station group, a position that heretofore did not exist. By that September, Cheatwood was hired as station manager for KYW-TV, the CBS-owned station in Philadelphia.

Cheatwood was promoted in April 2000 to be vice president of news for the CBS owned-station group and news director for network flagship WCBS-TV in New York City. Notably excluded from Cheatwood's oversight was WBBM-TV, which now employed Marin as lead anchor. Deeply mired in third place behind NBC flagship WNBC and ABC flagship WABC-TV for nearly two decades prior amid continual turnover and repeated budget cuts, WCBS was dubbed "the hardest job in local television news" by veteran executive Al Primo. In addition to focusing on more tabloid content, Cheatwood established content partnerships with CBS's digital assets like CBS MarketWatch and CBS HealthWatch, VH1, Court TV, Hollywood.com and the New York Daily News as a means to defer on additional talent hires, and re-hired Ernie Anastos as lead anchor; by October 2000, WCBS's newscasts were rebranded as the "CBS 2 Information Network". Under his direction, the station opened a full-time news bureau in Jerusalem, Israel, in February 2002, with CBS Radio News reporter Kimberly Dozier as correspondent.

Despite these changes, WCBS failed to sustain any positive ratings growth and suffered significant declines in the November 2001 sweeps. The failure was more pointed as WCBS was the only English-language television station to have a workable backup transmitter after the September 11 attacks. By August 2002, WNBC news director Dianne Doctor was hired to take over Cheatwood's WCBS duties.

=== Cable news and conservative media ===
Cheatwood joined CNN in 2003 as a program development executive and advisor to network president Jon Klein. During this time, CNN added Rick Sanchez, a onetime WSVN anchor, to their lineup and started to implement more emotionally-driven stories, particularly in prime time. When CNN Headline News transitioned to talk-based programming at night, Cheatwood developed shows for Glenn Beck and Nancy Grace, along with Showbiz Tonight, garnering the highest ratings for the channel in that time period. Cheatwood hired Beck, a syndicated conservative radio host, under the belief Beck could adapt his persona for a television audience. By April 2007, Cheatwood joined Fox News as vice president of development for both the channel and the soon-to-be launched Fox Business, reporting to Roger Ailes.

Cheatwood hired Beck to host a late-afternoon show for Fox News in October 2008. Beck chose to join Fox News as he and Cheatwood "speak the same language" and money was not a consideration. While a ratings success, Beck espoused multiple controversial statements and rhetoric, was subject to 296 individual advertisers on Fox News withholding their commercials on his show, and saw Cheatwood eventually lose Ailes' backing and become marginalized. Fox News and Beck's production company announced on April 6, 2011, that Beck would "transition off his daily program" by June 30, with Cheatwood becoming a "liaison" between the two parties. Beck moved his show to "GBTV", a streaming media venture, and Cheatwood was named president of programming.

"GBTV" was renamed TheBlaze in June 2012, and Cheatwood became president and chief content officer, later adding oversight of a radio news service TheBlaze created for Sirius XM Patriot. Cheatwood also oversaw the acquisition of programming for TheBlaze, including from Vince Vaughn and Peter Billingsley's production company, Wild West Picture Show Productions. Cheatwood officially parted ways with TheBlaze in February 2015; he resigned along with CEO Chris Balfe to lead a digital media startup, Red Seat Ventures. Cheatwood was later implicated in a defamation lawsuit filed against Beck by Abdulrahman Alharbi, whom Beck repeatedly claimed had financed the Boston Marathon bombing despite law enforcement clearing Alharbi; in early 2016, Beck claimed in depositions that Cheatwood and TheBlaze's investigations unit director Joe Weasel had direct knowledge of the sources within the Department of Homeland Security but refused to divulge names.

=== Merit Street Media ===
In November 2023, Phil McGraw announced the formation of Merit Street Media, a Fort Worth, Texas–based news and entertainment media outlet slated to launch in early 2024, with Joel Cheatwood serving as the network's chief operating officer. The following month, McGraw and Trinity Broadcasting Network agreed to make Merit Street a joint venture, with TBN assisting in distribution. Cheatwood will also oversee Merit Street's news service, which McGraw intends to keep separate from his on-air analysis; explaining the organizational structure, McGraw said Cheatwood "...is a savant in news and news programming. Me telling him about picking news stories would be like a jackass telling a racehorse how to run. I’m not gonna do that."

Four months after launching, Merit Street laid off 30 percent of their workforce. Cheatwood said production staff would now collaborate on all future programming over the network, calling the typical approach of news, sports and entertainment divisions "outdated" and "hindered productivity".

Prior to joining Merit Street, Cheatwood consulted for Tegna Inc.

== Personal life ==
Cheatwood married Neva Cheatwood in 1983 when both were co-workers at KMPH. Neva has since worked at various stations alongside Joel, including WHDH and WMAQ-TV. They have had two children, both from a previous marriage.

In a 1996 Boston Globe interview, Cheatwood disclosed he is a Christian but does not attend church.

== Filmography ==
=== Television ===
Year	Title	Role	Notes
1989–1990	Inside Story / Inside Report	Creator/executive producer	
1990–1991	Personalities	Executive producer	
1991–1996	7:30	Creator	
1996	Deco Drive	Creator	
2013	For the Record	Executive producer	
2013	Pursuit of the Truth	Executive producer	

=== Film ===
- 2013 – The Performance (executive producer)
- 2015 – Prescription Thugs (executive producer)
- 2018 – GameChangers: Dreams of BlizzCon (executive producer)
- 2022 – Fight for Football: Saving the 2020 Season (executive producer)
