= Deco Drive =

American television show

Deco Drive is a daily live celebrity gossip and entertainment news magazine style program featuring reports on trends and celebrities in South Florida.

It has aired continuously since January 8, 1996 on WSVN-TV in Miami, Florida, and has also been carried on WSVN's sister stations in Boston via their common ownership with Sunbeam Television.

The program is hosted by Lynn Martinez and Shireen Sandoval, with Alex Miranda providing live reports.

== History ==
On the date of WSVN's network affiliation change from NBC to Fox in 1989, the station debuted the locally produced news magazine program Inside Story. The program gradually shifted from news into an entertainment-based format, and was renamed 7:30 in 1994. After its time slot was moved to follow WSVN's evening newscast, 7:30 changed its title to Deco Drive (a reference to the Miami Beach Art Deco District and South Beach's Ocean Drive) in 1996.

Deco Drive officially premiered on WSVN in Miami and WHDH in Boston on January 8, 1996. However, the show was cancelled in Boston after six months. During its first month in Miami, Deco Drive scored a Nielsen rating of 5.8, or nine percent of all local televisions turned on at that time.

Deco Drive was initially positioned as a competitor to the nationally syndicated Entertainment Tonight, Extra and Access Hollywood, but was quickly changed to feature a heavier focus on Miami after its initial poor reception in the Boston market.

In April 2015, Deco Drive returned anew to Boston, now carried by WLVI, a sister CW affiliate to WHDH bought by Sunbeam in 2007.
