= Toby Lerner Ansin =

American patron of the arts

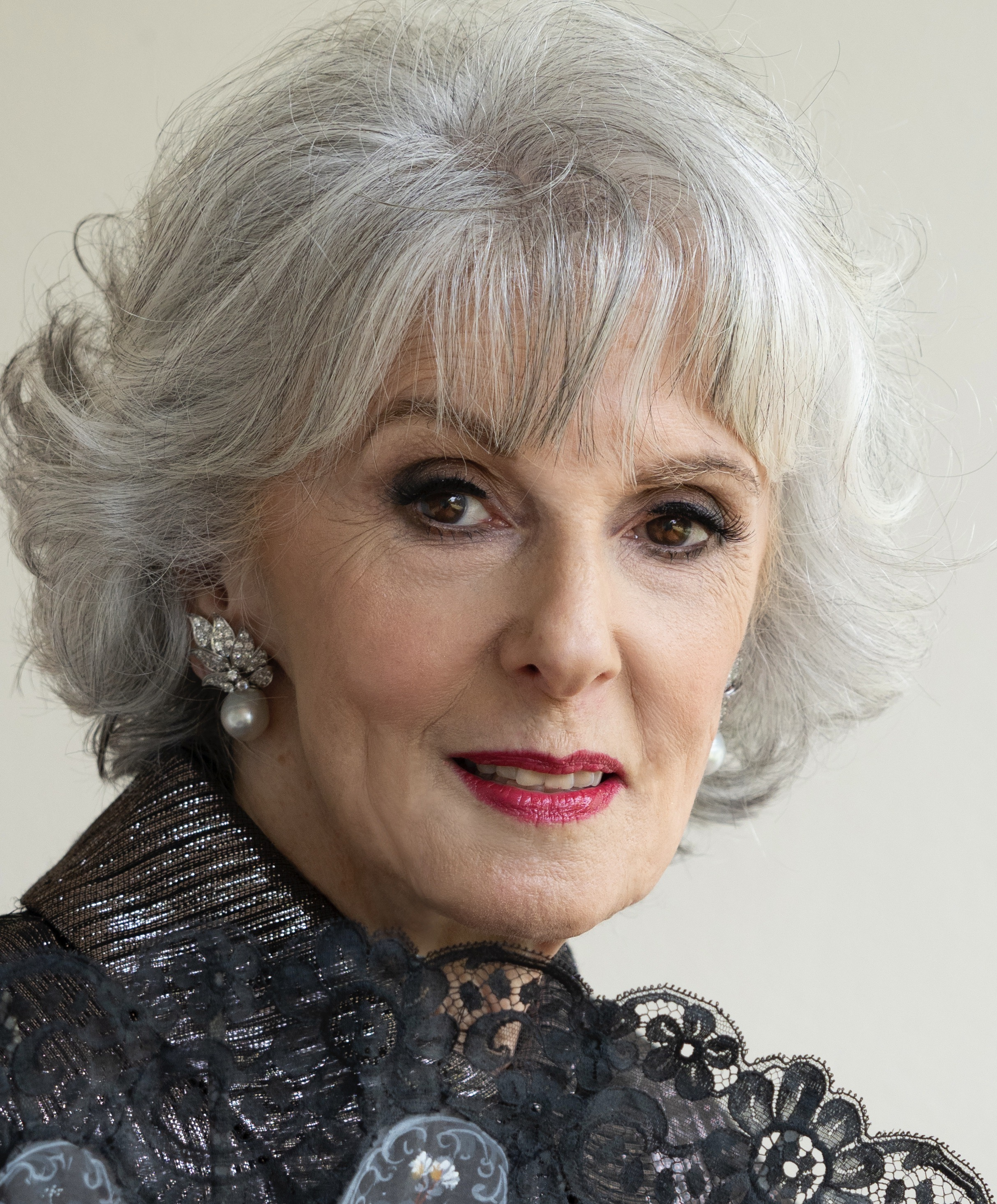
- Born: Toby Diane Lerner; January 3, 1941 (age 85); Boston, Massachusetts, U.S.
- Education: Wellesley College, University of Miami
- Known for: Founder of the Miami City Ballet
- Spouse: Edmund Ansin (m. 1961; div. 1983)
- Children: 3
- Awards: see list

Toby Lerner Ansin (born Toby Diane Lerner, January 3, 1941) is an American patron of the arts. In 1985, she founded the Miami City Ballet, a dance company that altered the cultural landscape of the city of Miami and which subsequently acquired a national and international reputation. Ansin has continuously served on the board of trustees since its founding. Miami City Ballet is the largest South Florida arts organization, reaching an annual audience of over 125,000 in four Florida counties. It includes a ballet school with over 1500 students and adults.

She was married to Edmund Ansin (1936–2020), co-founder of Sunbeam Television, from 1961 to 1983.

== Education ==
Toby Lerner attended Brookline High School in Brookline, Massachusetts, for her freshman year, then transferred to Buckingham School, now Buckingham Browne & Nichols, in Cambridge, Massachusetts, graduating in 1959. She attended Wellesley College in Wellesley, Massachusetts, from September 1959 until June 1961. Shortly after marrying Edmund Ansin, she transferred to the University of Miami in Coral Gables, Florida, graduating cum laude in 1963 with a B.A. in American history.

== Community service ==
From 1976 to 1981, Toby Lerner Ansin was chairperson of the Fine Arts of Beth David in Miami. Under her leadership, in 1978 she presented the Pearl Lang Dance Company; in 1979, pianist Emanuel Ax; and in 1980, cellist Nathaniel Rosen. In September 1980, in collaboration with art dealer Barbara Gillman, Ansin organized the personal appearance of Andy Warhol in Miami and the world premiere of his Ten Portraits of Jews of The 20th Century. From 1982 to 1987, Ansin was a councilperson on the Dade County Council of Arts and Sciences, and assisted in creating, implementing, and serving as liaison to the Dance Umbrella, a service organization for the dance companies of Dade County, Florida.

In 1985, David Eden, artistic consultant to the Dance Umbrella and a colleague of Ansin's, aware of her interest in creating a professional ballet company in South Florida, suggested she meet and consult with Edward Villella on what were the necessary steps to form a ballet company. On May 14, 1985, Villella came to Ansin's home in Coral Gables and met with her for three hours to discuss the specific artistic, administrative, and financial steps required to form a professional dance company. After he left, she called six friends, each of whom, along with Ansin, contributed $1000 ($2,994 in 2025), the seminal funds that resulted in the creation of the founding board of trustees of the Miami City Ballet (MCB), and the recruiting of Villella, initially as a consultant, then on a one-year contract as artistic director. Once a professional administrative staff was in place, Ansin focused her efforts on fund raising, special events, and public relations.

In 1987, Ansin flew to Monte Carlo, Monaco, and personally arranged for the visit of her Serene Highness Princess Caroline of Monaco to Miami the following April to benefit Miami City Ballet, Les Ballets de Monte-Carlo, and the Princess Grace Foundation.

For 27 years, Ansin worked without compensation, until her longtime companion, Leonard J. Rapport, was diagnosed with pancreatic cancer, requiring her to retire from active participation at MCB, except for remaining on the board of directors, to care for him until his death 10 months later.

Ansin remains an active board member of the MCB. Since 2010, the annual Toby Lerner Ansin Scholarship Award has been given to the most promising dancer in the MCB school.

== Personal life ==
Toby Lerner was born in Boston to Dr. Henry H. Lerner, a radiologist, and Helen (née Kruger) Lerner. Her brother Bennett Lerner (born 1944) became a concert pianist and made his debut at the Carnegie Recital Hall in New York City in 1976.

Toby Lerner married Edmund N. Ansin on June 11, 1961, and had three children with him: Andrew Lerner Ansin, James Lerner Ansin, and Stephanie Lerner Ansin. Stephanie Ansin was a co-founder of, and served as artistic director of, The PlayGround Theatre in Miami (now the Miami Theater Center).

The Ansins were divorced in November 1983. Edmund N. Ansin died in July 2020; the Sunbeam Television broadcast operations were expected to continue within the Ansin family, led by Andrew and James.

== Awards ==
- 1991, George Abbot Award for Outstanding Achievement in the Arts
- 1991, American Red Cross Spectrum Award
- 1997, Florida Arts Recognition Award
- 1999, James W. McLamore Outstanding Volunteer Award
- 2008, South Florida International Press Club Award for Community Service
- 2015, Dance/USA Champion Award
