= Frank Magid =

American marketing consultant

Frank Magid (September 1, 1931 – February 5, 2010) was an American marketing consultant, widely known for introducing the "Action News" format of evening local TV news, and was an original developer of Good Morning America. Time magazine named Magid "the nation's leading television news doctor" in 1977, and he became the namesake of the term "Magidized".

Magid was born in Chicago, Illinois. After serving in the Army during the Korean War, he earned his undergraduate and graduate degrees from the University of Iowa, paying his tuition and living expenses with proceeds from the GI Bill and a variety of part-time jobs.

While in an organic chemistry class, he met Marilyn Young, a chemistry major from Waterloo, Iowa. The two wed in 1956, and moved to Cedar Rapids, Iowa, where his wife had taken a job as a junior high science teacher. While a junior professor of social psychology, anthropology and statistics at the University of Iowa and Coe College, Magid launched his own company, Frank N. Magid Associates in 1956, selling his first research study to Merchants National Bank in Cedar Rapids.

Frank Magid died, aged 78, from lymphoma in Santa Barbara, California. He was survived by his wife, two sons, four grandchildren and a brother.
