= Asín (surname) =

Asín is a surname originating from Aragon, Spain. The Asín lineage of infanzones derives from the village of Asín de Broto, attested from the reigns of Pedro II and Jaime I (13th century), members of lower nobility from the reign of Pedro IV (14th century).

People with the name Asín:

- Miguel Asín Palacios
- Fernando de Andrés Asín
- Alfredo Quíspez Asín
