= Edmund Ansin =

American businessman (1936–2020)

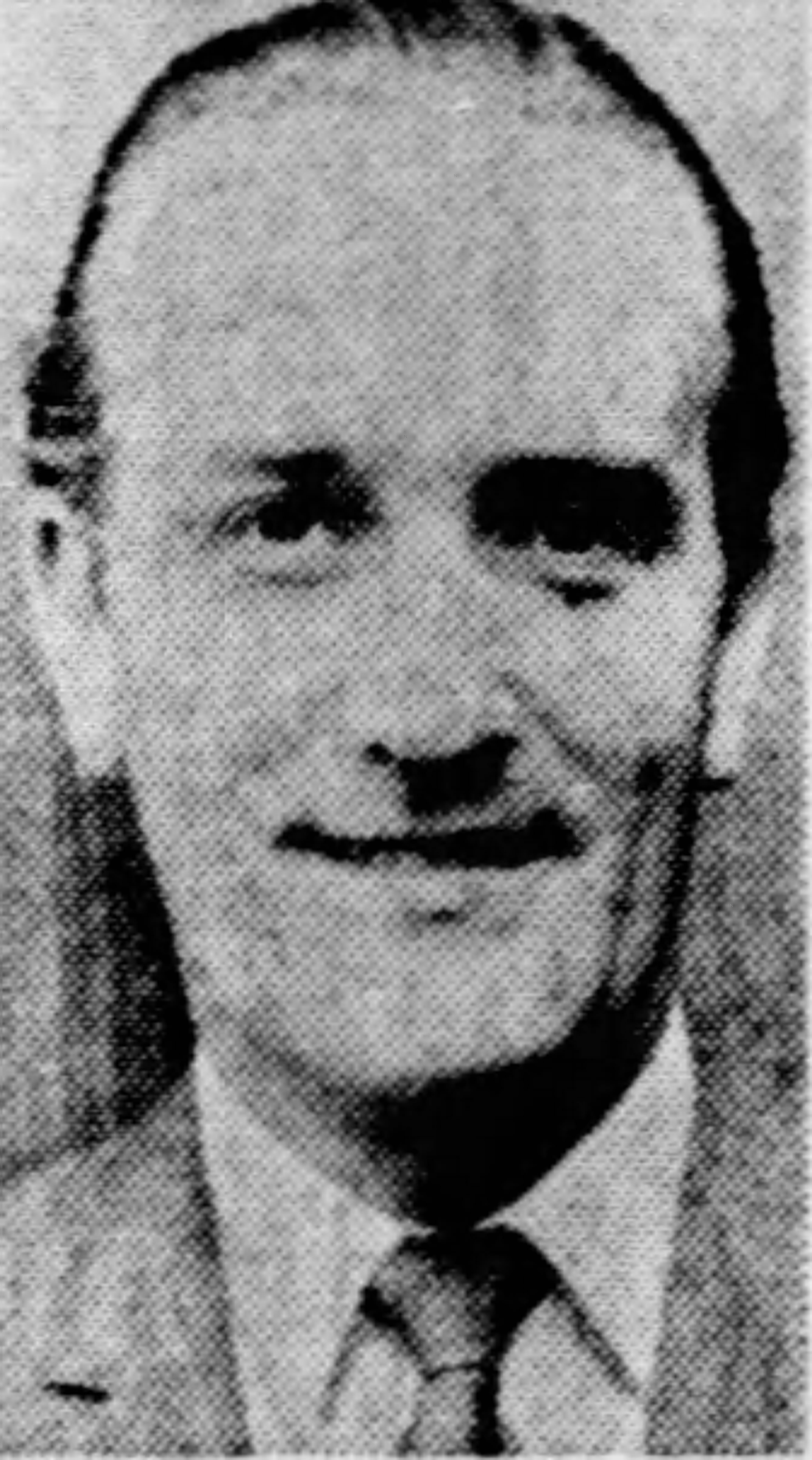
- Ansin in 1969
- Born: Edmund N. Ansin; March 9, 1936; Worcester, Massachusetts, U.S.
- Died: July 26, 2020 (aged 84); Miami Beach, Florida, U.S.
- Education: B.A., University of Pennsylvania, B.S., Wharton School
- Occupation: businessman
- Known for: co-founder of Sunbeam Television
- Spouse: Toby Lerner (divorced)
- Children: 3
- Father: Sidney D. Ansin

Edmund N. Ansin (March 9, 1936 – July 26, 2020) was an American billionaire and co-founder of Sunbeam Television. He was credited with being an innovator in the television news industry, breaking away from the conventional mold that had been used by other independent stations. His approach ended up being a success, first in Miami, and then Boston.

== Early life and education ==
Ansin was born to a Jewish family in Worcester, Massachusetts, and raised in nearby Athol, Massachusetts. In 1936, his father, Sidney D. Ansin, the son of a Ukrainian immigrant, founded Anwelt Shoe, a shoe manufacturing business in Fitchburg, Massachusetts. He moved the family to Florida in 1941. His parents were the founding members of Temple Beth Sholom in Miami Beach. Ansin was sent back to Massachusetts for preparatory school at Phillips Academy, Andover. After two years at Harvard University, he graduated in 1957 from the University of Pennsylvania with a BS in economics. His brother is former Massachusetts commerce commissioner Ronald Ansin. Ronald bought Anwelt Shoe from his father in 1966.

== Career ==
In 1962, Ansin and his father formed Sunbeam Television Corporation after Sidney Ansin purchased the license for Miami's NBC-affiliated television station, WCKT, for $3.4 million. Ed Ansin became an executive vice president at Sunbeam; after his father's death in 1971, he became Sunbeam's president. WCKT changed its call letters to WSVN in 1983, and at the end of 1988, WSVN lost its affiliation with NBC and Ansin, after rebuking then CBS chairman Laurence Tisch's offer to purchase the station, found himself without network affiliation. The station affiliated with the up-start Fox network, and supplemented its local news broadcasts with content from the newly launched CNN satellite network. Rather than follow the conventional approach used by successful independent stations (morning kids' shows, afternoon game shows, evening movies, and syndicated sitcoms), Ansin instead decided to focus on news. Instead of dry and stoic presentation, he and his news director, Joel Cheatwood, created the now ubiquitous 'Miami News style' with fast-paced reporting, crime-led stories, live breaking coverage, and pretty presenters. "If it bleeds, it leads" became an industry catch phrase. The approach was wildly successful and WSVN news soon became the market leader. WSVN reported $96 million in revenues in 2011.

In 1993, Ansin bought Boston's WHDH Channel 7. He shortened the time spent on individual news stories, relied heavily on video and audio effects, and emphasized "on-the-spot" reporting. In 2006, Sunbeam Television purchased Boston's WLVI, an affiliate for The CW, from Tribune Broadcasting.

Sunbeam Properties, a subsidiary of Sunbeam Television, developed the 400-acre (160 ha) Miramar Park of Commerce, the largest business park in Broward County.

In March 2025, it was announced that Ansin would be inducted posthumously to the Massachusetts Broadcasters Hall of Fame in June 2025, and also honored with that organization's Pioneer Award.

== Philanthropy ==
Ansin was the only person who has received the United Way's Alexis de Tocqueville Award for philanthropy in three different cities. He donated $1 million to build Emerson College's radio station and technical communications building. Ansin and his brother, Ron, former Massachusetts commerce commissioner, donated $2.6 million to the Boys and Girls Clubs of Boston and their Youth Service Providers Network.

== Personal life ==
Ansin was divorced from his wife, Toby Lerner Ansin, who founded the Miami City Ballet. They had three children: Andrew, James, and Stephanie. Stephanie Ansin was a co-founder of, and served as artistic director of, The PlayGround Theatre in Miami (now the Miami Theater Center). The Ansins were members of Temple Beth David.

Ansin died on July 26, 2020, at his home in Miami. He was 84 and had become unwell only over the weekend of his death. The Sunbeam Television broadcast operations were expected to continue within the Ansin family, led by Andrew and James.
