= Sunbeam Television =

American television broadcast company

Sunbeam Television Corporation
- Type: Private
- Industry: Broadcast television
- Founded: December 16, 1953; 72 years ago
- Founder: Sidney and Edmund Ansin
- Headquarters: Miami, Florida, U.S.
- Area served: United States
- Key people: Andrew Ansin; (President/CEO)
- Products: Broadcast television

Sunbeam Television Corporation is a privately held broadcasting company based in Miami, Florida, that owns three television stations in the United States. Since the company's founding in 1953, it has been under the control of the Ansin family.

== History ==
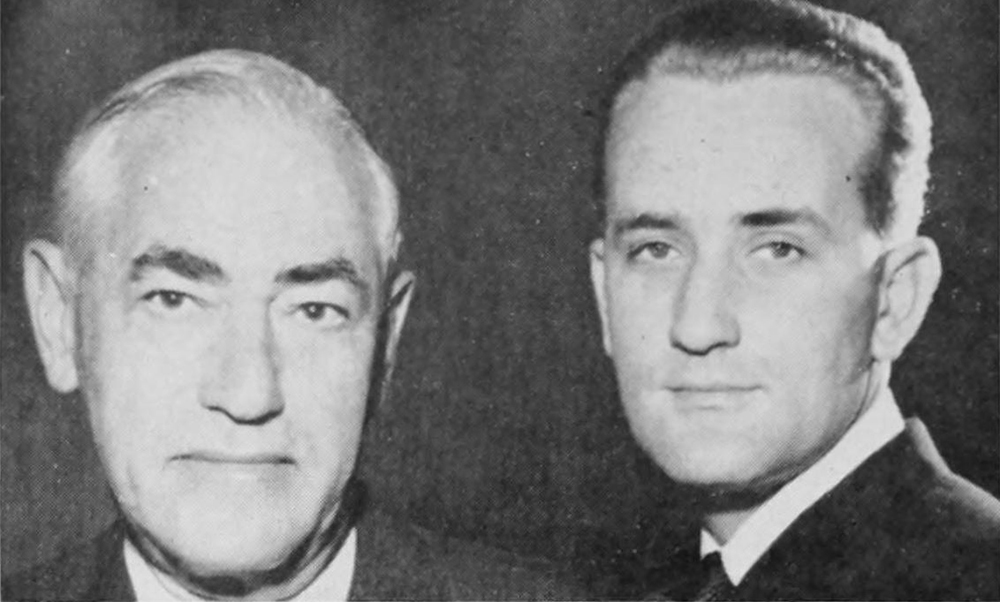
Sidney and Edmund Ansin

Sunbeam Television was founded on December 16, 1953, by Sidney Ansin, who inherited his family's shoemaking business in Massachusetts and later purchased South Florida real estate in the years after World War II, eventually settling in Miami Beach. Ansin's company was formed as one of five bidders for the channel 7 license in Miami, with sons Ronald and Edmund Ansin included as they had expressed interest in television themselves. While Biscayne Television Corporation, a three-way partnership between newspaper publishers James M. Cox and John S. Knight, along with former NBC president Niles Trammell, won the bidding process with the Federal Communications Commission (FCC) and signed on WCKT, their license was ultimately revoked after a combination of ethics violations within the FCC and improper conduct between the commissioners and Biscayne management. Sunbeam won a replacement license after it was determined that their bid was the only one amongst the original bidders conducted in an ethical manner, and purchased the assets of the former WCKT for their license, re-using the WCKT call sign.

Ed Ansin was installed as WCKT's executive vice president upon Sunbeam's takeover of the station. He became the company's president and chief operating officer after Sidney's death in October 1971. WCKT would change its call letters to WSVN in 1983 and would remain Sunbeam's lone property until 1993, when they acquired WHDH in Boston from New England Television.

As part of a wide-ranging series of asset sales by Tribune Broadcasting totaling $500 million, Sunbeam purchased Tribune's Boston CW affiliate WLVI for $117.3 million on September 14, 2006. When Sunbeam took control of the station on December 18, 2006, all local operations at WLVI ceased, with WLVI moving into WHDH's studios and WHDH-produced newscasts taking the place of WLVI's former 10 p.m. newscast.

Following Ed Ansin's death on July 26, 2020, ownership of Sunbeam Television was passed on to his sons Andrew and James, a wish Ed had publicly expressed as early as 1987. Andrew Ansin was appointed as Sunbeam's president/CEO on August 3, 2020.

=== 1987–88 NBC affiliation dispute ===
WSVN became a central player in a protracted dispute between Sunbeam, CBS and NBC that lasted for nearly two years. Kohlberg Kravis Roberts (KKR), a merchant banker that purchased the parent company of CBS affiliate WTVJ (channel 4) in 1983, was required to sell the station in order to meet regulatory approval for a different leveraged buyout two years later. At the same time, CBS was exploring the purchase of a station in the Miami market and originally bid $350 million for WTVJ, but KKR opted to sell it in a package deal to Lorimar-Telepictures in April 1986. Lorimar withdrew their offer for WTVJ several months later after learning CBS inquired with the owners of Fox affiliate WCIX (channel 6) about a purchase of that station instead; this threat, along with a rejected $170 million offer by CBS, prompted KKR to offer WTVJ to Capital Cities/ABC and NBC parent General Electric (GE). GE then purchased WTVJ for $270 million on January 16, 1987, 15 days after signing an affiliation contract extension with WSVN: for the first time in the history of North American television, a television network purchased an affiliate of a competitor.

Sunbeam and Ed Ansin contested the sale of WTVJ before the FCC; while NBC committed to honor their contract with WSVN, Ansin raised concerns NBC could create a competitive disadvantage by owning WTVJ yet operate it as a CBS affiliate for two years. Despite retaining former FCC commissioner Charles D. Ferris and the support of multiple elected representatives, the FCC approved the sale in September 1987, with NBC contractually obligated to run WTVJ as a CBS affiliate until April 1988 at the earliest. At the same time, CBS was forced to negotiate with Ansin by default after WCIX was sold to the TVX Broadcast Group, but an impasse developed over the network's insistence to join WSVN as soon as possible, while Ansin wanted to honor the NBC contract in full. TVX, badly overleveraged from their purchase of WCIX and several other stations, was pressured to sell the station by creditor Salomon Brothers (which held 60 percent ownership in TVX), and whom CBS began talks with about a purchase.

On August 8, 1988, CBS agreed to purchase WCIX as their replacement affiliate, effectively rendering WSVN as an independent station on January 1, 1989. CBS also signed a deal with West Palm Beach's ABC affiliate WPEC, now resulting in a complex six-station affiliate shuffle in two markets. As soon as CBS's WCIX purchase was announced, Ansin announced WSVN would become a news-intensive station, a stance that was ridiculed in the local media. Despite losing their program director and having a thin off-network syndicated program inventory, the station committed to producing 7 1/2 hours of local newscasts on weekdays, unheard of for any independent in the United States prior. WSVN made the move under the presumption that their current audience would not defect to other channels despite the loss of network programming. By October 1988, WSVN signed up as the market's new Fox affiliate and linked with CNN for national news coverage, but marketed and prompted themselves as an independent.

WSVN's performance in their first year as a news-intensive Fox affiliate shattered conventional wisdom and attracted industry notice. While WSVN experienced ratings declines in prime time with the loss of NBC fare, their early-evening newscasts not only remained stable, but surpassed WTVJ for second place. News director Joel Cheatwood, regarded as the architect of WSVN's tabloid format, was hired by Fox for one year to help develop a national news service of their own. By 1994, Fox network president Lucie Salhany called WSVN "the future of television".

=== The Jay Leno Show ===
On April 2, 2009, WHDH in Boston announced that it would not join other NBC affiliates in airing a new hour-long program fronted by outgoing Tonight Show host Jay Leno. Instead, the station said it would simulcast an hour of local news at 10 p.m. with its sister station WLVI. In its statement, Sunbeam CEO Ed Ansin cited concerns with both ratings and advertising revenue for its existing 11 p.m. newscast as the main impetus for the decision. NBC answered Sunbeam with a threat to strip WHDH of its affiliation. WHDH had offered to air the new program at 11 p.m. as a compromise, but the network rejected that offer.

With the threats of lawsuits and the strong possibility of NBC making good on its promise, WHDH reconsidered its decision two weeks later. However, Ansin's foresight would later prove to be correct. Viewership for WHDH's 11 p.m. news dropped 20 percent in the November 2009 sweeps period, and a wave of affiliate complaints about similar declines for their late newscasts would force NBC to end the primetime run of the program on February 11, 2010, in a very controversial shake-up of its late night lineup.

=== WHDH NBC disaffiliation ===
Nearly five years after the Jay Leno Show conflict, WHDH once again faced the prospect of losing its NBC affiliation as the network was seeking an owned-and-operated presence in Boston. In September 2015, NBC informed Sunbeam owner Ed Ansin that WHDH's affiliation would not be renewed, but then made an offer to buy the station for $200 million. Ansin balked at NBC's price stating that he would not consider any offers worth less than $500 million, and that any sale of WHDH would also include WLVI. Publicly, Ansin predicted that "we’re going to be the NBC affiliate", but also confirmed that NBC was planning to shift its programming to WNEU, a station based in Merrimack, New Hampshire owned by NBC sister network Telemundo. Ansin believed that NBCUniversal's main motivation for these moves was to create further synergies with WNEU and co-owned New England Cable News for the purposes of advertising sales. Initial reports suggested that if WHDH were to lose NBC programming, Sunbeam would move the CW affiliation currently held by WLVI to WHDH. However, Ansin later stated that WHDH would be operated as a news-intensive independent station if the NBC affiliation were lost; additionally, the possibility existed The CW's corporate co-parent, CBS, could transfer the CW affiliation to its owned duopoly station WSBK-TV in the fall of 2016, if WLVI were unable to renew its contract with the network.

On January 7, 2016, NBC Owned Television Stations president Valari Staab confirmed that NBC would cease its affiliation with WHDH effective January 1, 2017, and that it would launch its owned-and-operated NBC outlet on January 1, 2017. Staab did not outright say whether NBC programming will be carried by WNEU, but that NBCUniversal was evaluating options for over-the-air carriage of the new outlet. Prior to the announcement, Ansin told the Boston Globe that he was considering challenging the planned move of NBC from WHDH; he argued that the possible reduction in over-the-air coverage NBC may sustain if it moves to WNEU would constitute a violation of conditions imposed by the FCC upon Comcast's acquisition of NBC Universal, as it would not be in the public interest. His position was supported by U.S. Senator Edward Markey.

Ed Ansin tried to file a lawsuit against NBC on March 10, 2016, for violating antitrust law given to Comcast when it brought NBCUniversal and that WNEU's over-the-air signal only covers half of Eastern Massachusetts. His lawsuit, however, was closed off on May 16, 2016.

Ansin conceded his battle against NBCUniversal on August 16, 2016, and announced that WHDH would become an independent station at the start of 2017. WHDH planned to expand its newscasts in various dayparts, while counterprogramming the networks with syndicated offerings during primetime hours. Three months later in November, NBCUniversal made their plains formal: the company announced that NBC programming would move from WHDH to new O&O WBTS-LD, a low-power station acquired in September 2016. WBTS-LD would serve as the affiliate of record in Boston proper, and would also be simulcasted on the second digital subchannel of WNEU.

== Stations ==
City of license / Market	Station	Channel TV (RF)	Owned since	Affiliation
Boston–Cambridge, MA	WHDH	7 (35)	1993	Independent
Boston–Cambridge, MA	WLVI †	56 (35)	2006	The CW
Miami–Fort Lauderdale, FL	WSVN	7 (9)	1962	Fox, ABC

- † - As of January 9, 2018, channel shares on WHDH's spectrum.

Through an arrangement with Findal Media & Technology Group, owner of WDFL-LD, Sunbeam also programs channel 18.1 in Miami as a simulcast of WSVN's ABC channel.

== Controversies ==
=== DirecTV carriage dispute ===
At midnight on January 14, 2012, Sunbeam shut down its link between its stations and the DirecTV satellite service after talks to increase the retransmission fees paid to the stations by a reported 300% failed. The effect of this dispute affected an estimated 230,000 customers in the South Florida area and interfered with the carriage of several NFL football games by local bars that subscribed to DirecTV during the outage. The dispute was resolved between Sunbeam and DirecTV with those local channels being restored to those affected customers at 6 pm on January 26.
