= WHDH (TV) =

Television station in Boston

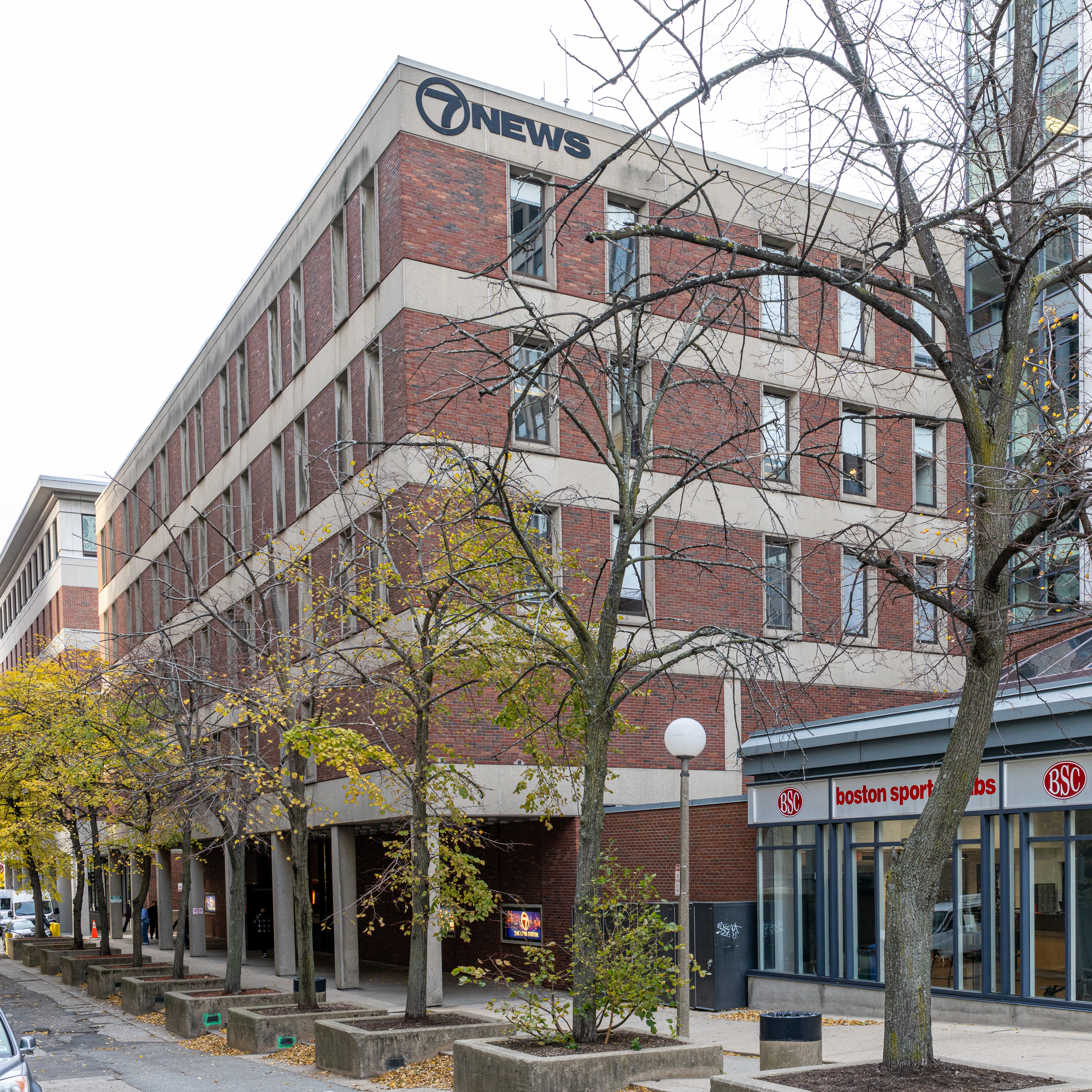
- Studios at Bulfinch Place
- Boston, Massachusetts; United States
- Channels: Digital: 35 (UHF), shared with WLVI; Virtual: 7
- Branding: "7" or WHDH Channel 7; 7 News

Programming
- Affiliations: 7.1: Independent; 7.2: Defy

Ownership
- Owner: Sunbeam Television; (WHDH-TV)
- Sister stations: WLVI

History
- Founded: February 1982
- First air date: May 22, 1982
- Former call signs: WNEV-TV (1982–1990); WHDH-TV (1990–2010)
- Former channel numbers: Analog: 7 (VHF, 1982–2009); Digital: 42 (UHF, 1999–2009, 2009–2019), 7 (VHF, 2009)
- Former affiliations: CBS (1982–1995); NBC (1995–2017)
- Call sign meaning: sequentially assigned to former radio sister station WHDH (AM)

Technical information
- Licensing authority: FCC
- Facility ID: 72145
- ERP: 1,000 kW
- HAAT: 304.1 m (998 ft)
- Transmitter coordinates: 42°18′41″N 71°12′58″W

Links
- Public license information: Public file; LMS
- Website: whdh.com

WHDH (channel 7) is an independent television station in Boston, Massachusetts, United States. It is owned by Sunbeam Television alongside Cambridge-licensed CW affiliate WLVI (channel 56). WHDH and WLVI share studios at Bulfinch Place (near Bowdoin Square and Government Center) in downtown Boston; through a channel sharing agreement, the two stations transmit using WHDH's spectrum from the WHDH-TV tower in Newton, Massachusetts.

From 1982 to 1995, WHDH was Boston's CBS affiliate, inheriting the affiliation from its predecessor on channel 7, WNAC-TV. On January 2, 1995, WHDH switched to NBC, after CBS moved to WBZ-TV (channel 4) by virtue of a group-wide affiliation deal with its owner, Westinghouse Broadcasting (CBS and Westinghouse merged that November, making WBZ-TV a CBS owned-and-operated station). On January 1, 2017, after losing NBC's affiliation to a newly formed owned-and-operated station, WBTS-CD (channel 15), WHDH became a news-intensive independent station.

== History ==
=== WNAC-TV's fight for survival and transition (1948–1982) ===
The original occupant of the channel 7 allocation in Boston was WNAC-TV, which commenced operations on June 21, 1948, as Boston's second commercial station. Originally a CBS affiliate, the station switched to ABC in 1961, but rejoined CBS in 1972.

By 1965, WNAC-TV's owner, RKO General, faced numerous investigations into its business and financial practices. Though the Federal Communications Commission (FCC) renewed WNAC-TV's license in 1969, RKO General lost the license in 1981 after its parent company, General Tire, admitted to a litany of corporate misconduct—which among other things, included the admission that General Tire had committed financial fraud over illegal political contributions and bribes—as part of a settlement with the U.S. Securities and Exchange Commission. However, in the FCC hearings, RKO General had withheld evidence of General Tire's misconduct, and had also failed to disclose evidence of accounting errors on its own part. In light of RKO's dishonesty, the FCC stripped RKO of the Boston license and the licenses for KHJ-TV in Los Angeles and WOR-TV in New York City. The FCC had previously conditioned renewal of the latter two stations' licenses on WNAC-TV's renewal. An appeals court partially reversed the ruling, finding that RKO's dishonesty alone merited having the WNAC-TV license removed. However, it held that the FCC had overreached in tying the other two license renewals to WNAC-TV's renewal, and ordered new hearings.

Though RKO continued to appeal the decision, in late February 1982 the FCC granted the New England Television Corporation (NETV, a merger of two of the original rivals to the station's license controlled by Boston grocery magnate David Mugar) a construction permit to build a new station on channel 7. Two months later in April, the U.S. Supreme Court declined to hear RKO's appeal, leaving the firm with no further recourse but to accept the Commission's decision and surrender WNAC-TV's license. RKO then sold the station's non-license physical assets, including its studio on Bulfinch Place and transmitter/tower site in suburban Newton, to NETV. RKO General formally surrendered the WNAC-TV license at midnight on May 21, 1982; the station signed off as WNAC-TV for the final time about an hour later.

=== As WNEV-TV (1982–1990) ===
NETV took over channel 7 nearly five hours later under a new license, signing on the new WNEV-TV at 5:55 a.m. ET that morning (however, the present WHDH does claim WNAC's previous history as its own; a similar situation exists locally with the present-day WCVB and the original WHDH). Behind the imaging theme "There's a New Day Dawning", WNEV-TV dropped WNAC-TV's strip-layered "7" logo in favor of a new stylized "SE7EN" logo. However, the new station inherited WNAC-TV's CBS affiliation and syndicated program contracts, and most of the former WNAC-TV staff—including news reporter and anchor Mike Taibbi, who signed the station on the air in a brief ceremony prior to WNEV-TV's first program, CBS' Summer Semester.

NETV's mission from the start was to allocate programming hours to innovative, in-house productions, in much the same way that Boston Broadcasters did when it launched WCVB-TV on channel 5 ten years earlier. Notable productions that premiered early on were Look (1982–1984), which began as a two-hour (4 p.m. to 6 p.m.) late afternoon talk and lifestyle show that led into WNEV's 6 p.m. newscast. Despite a powerful effort at an entertaining and informative program, and praise from critics, Look was a ratings failure; for its second year, the show was cut back to an hour and renamed New England Afternoon before being dropped. WNEV continued to produce talk programs, first with Morning/Live (1984–1987), a half-hour weekday morning talk show hosted by Susan Sikora, and later with the similarly structured Talk of the Town (1988), hosted by Matt Lauer. Nancy Merrill, former host of WBZ-TV's People Are Talking, headlined two talk shows on WNEV, the weekend late night entry Merrill at Midnight (1986–87) and the weekday morning program Nancy Merrill (1987–88).

NETV also made it an immediate purpose to further diversify the station's workforce, both on-air and behind the scenes. Within WNEV's first couple of years, there was an increase of news reporters and anchors of color joining the station (notably including anchor Lester Strong and reporter Amalia Barreda). The commitment to diversity extended itself to a series of new public affairs shows that each targeted a specific ethnic group: Urban Update (with an African-American focus and which still continues to air on WHDH), Revista Hispana, Asian Focus and Jewish Perspective. Other public affairs and newsmagazines launched by WNEV included a Sunday morning religious affairs program, Higher Ground, the weekend talk and advice show Boston Common, the Saturday night newsmagazine Our Times, and Studio 7, which focused on the arts.

In 1987, another of WNEV's ambitious efforts premiered, the hour-long live children's variety show Ready to Go. Featuring Broadway actress/singer Liz Callaway and Scott Reese, who not only hosted but also sang and acted, the program featured an equal mix of entertainment and educational content, along with musical acts and celebrity interviews. The series began as a 6 a.m. to 7 a.m. programming alternative against WBZ and WCVB's morning newscasts, before moving to 7 a.m. in September 1989. On March 24, 1990, after only six months at its new time slot, the station cut the series back to once-a-week Saturday broadcasts only, before canceling the show outright in 1991.

In mid-August 1987, WNEV overhauled its on-air image. The station dropped its "SE7EN" identity in favor of a new logo, which consisted of the number "7" made up of seven white dots inside of a blue circle. The logo was introduced as a part of the new station-wide campaign, "We're All on the Same Team", in which the seven dots represented the heads of team members. The dots also had dual usage, as lottery balls, in promotions for Lottery Live, the Massachusetts State Lottery drawings which were moving to WNEV late that summer. The campaign was primarily launched as a continued attempt to bolster the station's third-place news ratings, and to promote its news-sharing partnership with other TV and radio stations, The New England News Exchange.

=== WHDH radio (1990–1992) ===
Throughout the 1980s, WNEV-TV frequently partnered with WHDH radio (850 AM, now WEEI) for public events such as Project Bread and the Walk For Hunger, as well as for other initiatives. NETV would eventually purchase WHDH on August 7, 1989. In January 1990, Mugar announced that on March 12 of that year, WNEV would change its call letters to WHDH-TV, in order to correspond with its sister radio operation. The WHDH-TV call sign was previously used by the original occupant of channel 5, under the ownership of the Boston Herald-Traveler, from 1957 to 1972. It was Mugar's plan to create, once again, a second major television/radio duopoly, primarily in news, to compete with the long-standing combo of WBZ radio and WBZ-TV. Boston Mayor Ray Flynn declared March 12, 1990, as "WHDH Day" in Boston, celebrating the joining of the radio and television stations. On that day, personalities from WHDH-TV spoke as guests on WHDH radio.

The dual operation, which began with much fanfare and leverage, proved to be too costly for Mugar and company. NETV gradually slid into a deficit, prompting cutbacks on in-house programming as well as in the television station's news department; the most notable effect being the elimination of WHDH-TV's 5 p.m. newscast for two years beginning in 1991. With channel 7's news ratings in third place, minimal help from CBS (which had been in a ratings slump since the end of the 1987–88 television season) and declining profits, Mugar was eventually prompted to sell the WHDH stations. The radio station was sold to Atlantic Ventures in 1992.

=== Sale to Sunbeam ===
By 1991, the relationship between majority owner David Mugar and minority owner Robert Kraft had become strained. Kraft, who became owner of the New England Patriots in 1994, exercised an option that forced Mugar to purchase his shares for an estimated $25 million. This, along with the nearly $100 million debt he held from the 1986 buyout and falling advertising revenues left Mugar strapped for cash. On April 22, 1993, David Mugar entered into an agreement to sell WHDH to Miami-based Sunbeam Television, a company led by Worcester native Edmund Ansin. The purchase was completed in late July.

Shortly afterward, Ansin brought in news director Joel Cheatwood from his Miami flagship station WSVN. Cheatwood had become infamous in Miami for his changes to WSVN's news operation, which focused on visually intensive, fast-paced newscasts with heavy emphasis on tabloid journalism, particularly covering crime (WSVN—which was an NBC affiliate from its 1956 sign-on until it joined Fox in 1989—adopted the format developed by Cheatwood in order to buoy viewership for its newscasts, which like WHDH, had languished in third place for several years). Cheatwood planned to perform similar changes at WHDH. Cheatwood ultimately adopted a considerably watered-down version of WSVN's format (see below), but still retained many of WSVN's features, including a faster-paced format, increased use of graphics and visuals, and more on-the-scene reporting. It even adopted WSVN's version of the Circle 7 logo. While critics were concerned that WHDH would lose even more viewers if it were to adopt WSVN's format entirely, WHDH quickly rebounded to become the number one newscast in Boston for a period.

=== As an NBC affiliate (1995–2017) ===
In 1994, WBZ-TV's owner, Westinghouse Broadcasting entered into a groupwide affiliation deal with CBS, which resulted in three Group W stations that were affiliated with networks other than CBS—NBC affiliates WBZ-TV, and KYW-TV in Philadelphia, and ABC affiliate WJZ-TV in Baltimore—switching to the network. Fox, already associated with Sunbeam through its affiliation with WSVN, considered an affiliation deal with WHDH (even before the Group W announcement, channel 7 had reportedly been considering dropping CBS for Fox); however, on August 2, 1994, WHDH-TV announced that it had agreed to affiliate with NBC instead of Fox, in part citing NBC's stronger news and sports programming. Fox ultimately chose to acquire its existing affiliate, WFXT (channel 25). WHDH became Boston's NBC affiliate on January 2, 1995, replacing WBZ-TV (which had been with the network for 46 years). The final CBS program to air on channel 7 was the made-for-TV movie A Father for Charlie at 9 p.m. Eastern Time on January 1, 1995.

During its time with NBC, channel 7 cleared the network's entire programming schedule (an exception was the network's early morning newscast at the time of the switch, NBC News at Sunrise, which ended on September 6, 1999; its successor, Early Today, was carried by WHDH for the remainder of its NBC affiliation). Between 1996 and 1997, WHDH produced a mid-morning weekday newsmagazine for the NBC network called Real Life. After the switch to NBC, WHDH became one of the few stations in the country to have had a primary affiliation with all of the Big Three networks. On September 14, 2006, Tribune Broadcasting sold CW affiliate WLVI-TV (channel 56) to Sunbeam Television for $117.3 million. The sale was approved by the FCC in late November of that year, creating Boston's second television duopoly (the other one being WBZ-TV and WSBK-TV, channel 38). WLVI moved its operations from its Dorchester studios to WHDH's facilities in downtown Boston.

On April 2, 2009, WHDH announced that it would not air The Jay Leno Show, when it debuted on NBC in September 2009, electing to replace it with a simulcast of the 10 p.m. newscast that WHDH began producing for WLVI in order to better compete with Fox affiliate WFXT. The network quickly dismissed any move of Leno to any time slot other than 10 p.m., stating that WHDH's plan was a "flagrant" violation of the station's contract with the network and that it would consider moving the NBC affiliation to another Boston area station, either by creating an owned-and-operated station through an "existing broadcast license" in the market owned by NBC or by seeking inquiries from other stations in the market to acquire the affiliation. WHDH began removing all references to the proposed 10 p.m. newscast from its website the next day, and on April 13, 2009, the station announced that it had decided to comply and air The Jay Leno Show instead.

The fears of possible ratings issues with the prime time talk show as the lead-in for its late newscast would become well-realized, as viewership for WHDH's 11 p.m. news plunged to third place (a 20% drop from the previous year) during the November 2009 sweeps period. Other 'first-to-last' drops among NBC affiliates' newscasts in the 11 p.m. slot and overall affiliate pressure forced the network on January 10, 2010, to pull Leno from 10 p.m. starting after the 2010 Winter Olympics and move him back to The Tonight Show in a controversial shake-up of its late night schedule. Although the radio station had dropped the WHDH callsign in 1994, channel 7 retained the "-TV" suffix in its call letters until July 8, 2010.

=== Loss of NBC affiliation ===
It was reported on August 31, 2015, that NBC Owned Television Stations was considering the possibility of purchasing WHDH; NBCUniversal already had a strong presence in the market through its ownership of New England Cable News (NECN), CSN New England, and Telemundo station WNEU (channel 60), while WHDH's NBC affiliation was set to expire at the end of 2016. Meredith Corporation and Nexstar Broadcasting Group were also reportedly interested in purchasing the station. NBCUniversal and Sunbeam denied these rumors. Sunbeam's Executive Vice President and former WHDH general manager Chris Wayland, stated that the company "fully [expects]" that it would renew WHDH's affiliation. The Boston Globe noted a history of hostility between NBC and Sunbeam, including its objection to NBC's late-1980s purchase of WTVJ in Miami to displace its own WSVN (which later defected to Fox), and the aforementioned conflicts surrounding The Jay Leno Show. On October 1, 2015, The Boston Globe reported that NBC had considered moving the affiliation to NECN, a cable channel, rather than to an over-the-air channel, although the company declined to comment.

On December 15, 2015, New England One reported, citing internal sources, that NBCUniversal had declined to renew its affiliation with WHDH, and was beginning the process of building an English-language news operation at WNEU for its assumption of the affiliation. It also reported that WHDH meteorologist Pete Bouchard, who had left the station around the same time, had been poached by NBC for WNEU. Following the report, Paul Magnes, WHDH's vice president and general manager, told the Boston Herald that the station still expected the NBC affiliation to be renewed.

Sunbeam owner Ed Ansin subsequently confirmed to The Boston Globe that NBC had informed him in September 2015, that channel 7's affiliation would not be renewed, and offered to buy the station for $200 million; however, he said that he would not consider any offers worth less than $500 million, and that any sale of WHDH would also include WLVI. Ansin said that NBC was "trying to steal our station", and confirmed that the network was threatening to shift its programming to WNEU, but that he still predicted that WHDH would retain its NBC affiliation. Ansin believed that NBCUniversal's main motivation for these moves were to create further synergies with WNEU and New England Cable News for the purposes of advertising sales. Initial reports suggested that if WHDH were to lose NBC programming, Sunbeam would move the CW affiliation currently held by WLVI to channel 7. However, Ansin subsequently stated that WHDH would be operated as a news-intensive independent station if the NBC affiliation was lost; additionally, WLVI's own affiliation with The CW (a ten-year agreement made in 2006 with then-owner Tribune Broadcasting) was up for renewal in August 2016, and there was a possibility that CBS (who, along with Time Warner, at the time had co-ownership of The CW) could transfer the CW affiliation to WSBK-TV (then-affiliated with MyNetworkTV) if WLVI was unable to renew.

On January 7, 2016, Valari Staab, president of NBC Owned Television Stations, confirmed that NBC would cease its affiliation with WHDH effective January 1, 2017, and that it would launch its owned-and-operated NBC outlet NBC Boston that day. Staab did not outright say whether NBC programming would be carried by WNEU, but that NBCUniversal was evaluating options for over-the-air carriage of the new outlet. Prior to the announcement, Ansin told The Boston Globe that he was considering challenging the planned move of NBC from WHDH, arguing that the proposed move would be in violation of conditions imposed by the FCC upon Comcast's acquisition of NBC Universal, as the company agreed to maintain the over-the-air availability of NBC, and not use its cable holdings to influence affiliation deals. His position was supported by Senator Edward Markey; a representative of Markey stated that as a "long-time supporter of universal service and free, over-the-air local broadcasting", he planned to "closely scrutinize the impacts any deal could have on viewers in Massachusetts".

On March 10, 2016, Sunbeam Television sued Comcast in the District Court for the District of Massachusetts, citing violations of antitrust law and the conditions which Comcast agreed to upon its purchase of NBC Universal. Sunbeam argued that because WNEU's over-the-air signal radius covers four million fewer residents than WHDH, over-the-air viewers in these areas would have to purchase pay television service in order to maintain access to NBC programming—which would benefit Comcast's cable business. Sunbeam also asserted that moving NBC to a company-owned station would "[enable] Comcast to increase its monopoly power in the Boston television market, and the resulting decrease in competition will harm consumers, advertisers and other broadcasters". On May 16, 2016, the court granted a request of Comcast to dismiss the lawsuit, Judge Richard Stearn stated the loss of over-the-air coverage "may be a matter of public concern, [but] it is not a concern that WHDH has standing to redress", and that "absent any actionable harm attributable to Comcast, it is simply an indurate consequence of doing business in a competitive and unsentimental marketplace". WHDH intended to appeal the dismissal, and filed a notice of appeal on June 14, 2016; in a statement, Ansin said that the station believed "the judge got it all wrong, so we are reviewing our options for an appeal".

On August 16, 2016, Ansin announced that he would no longer pursue the appeal against NBC, arguing that it was unlikely that the appeal would be resolved in his favor. Consequentially, the station officially announced a planned expansion of its news programming, including an expanded morning newscast and a prime time block of news spanning from 9 p.m. to 11:30 p.m., and that the 8 p.m. hour would be filled by syndicated programming. However, station lawyer Michael Gass told the Boston Business Journal that channel 7 was still pursuing the appeal, saying that "[t]hey have to prepare to be a non-affiliate and have a plan for doing that even though we continue to believe that Comcast did not honor its obligations to us", while conceding that it was unlikely that a court would force NBC to remain on WHDH.

On November 1, 2016, NBCUniversal announced that it planned to simulcast NBC Boston on both WNEU's second digital subchannel and on WBTS-LD (now WYCN-LD), the former WTMU-LP purchased by NBC the previous September. Initially, NBC also leased a subchannel of WMFP to help provide full-market coverage. This agreement ended in 2018 when NBC purchased Nashua, New Hampshire-licensed WYCN-CD (now WBTS-CD), to channel share with full-power PBS member station WGBX-TV, which transmits from Needham. WHDH's affiliation formally ended at 3 a.m. ET on January 1, 2017. The final NBC program aired on channel 7 was New Year's Eve with Carson Daly, which began on December 31, 2016, at 11:30 p.m.

== Programming ==
=== Preempted programming ===
As a CBS affiliate, the station preempted programming in moderation, in favor of more locally produced shows. From 1989 to 1990, the station delayed the first hour of CBS This Morning in favor of the children's show Ready To Go. In February 1994, CBS This Morning was dropped and picked up by WABU (channel 68, now WBPX-TV). WHDH then began airing an expanded local morning newscast.

=== Special events ===
On July 4, 2018, WHDH began to simulcast the Boston Pops Fireworks Spectacular yearly with Bloomberg Television, returning the event to local television after a one-year absence. It also broadcast A Boston Pops Salute to Our Heroes, which was produced in lieu of the 2020 edition of the event due to its cancellation as a result of the COVID-19 pandemic. The national broadcast of the concert moved to The CW in 2025, and then CNN in 2026 (with coverage incorporated into its larger The Fourth in America special, and the full event streaming on the CNN app), but WHDH has continued to air the event in the Boston area.

=== Lottery ===
WNEV/WHDH had exclusive rights to Lottery Live, broadcasting the Massachusetts State Lottery games six nights a week from August 31, 1987, to March 6, 1994. Motivated to cultivate an identity to the station that would indirectly help its last-place news ratings, WNEV acquired the lottery from WBZ-TV, which had announced late in 1986 that it would no longer show the games. The arrival of the lottery games was promoted heavily, and went hand-in-hand with the station's on-air image change that fall; the new dotted-7 logo that was adopted during that time had a dual meaning, in that the dots were to represent lottery balls.

A contest was held by WNEV in August 1987, just under a month before the games moved to the station, to scout for their own lottery host (Tom Bergeron, who hosted Lottery Live on WBZ-TV, did not continue in the role because he remained at that station in other capacities). The auditions were held in front of an audience of 200 at Boston's Westin Hotel at Copley Place, in which the finalists were narrowed down to 16. The winner was Lynn-Andrea Waugh, familiarly known as "Andi", a 29-year-old red-haired model who had no prior on-air experience. Despite being well received by viewers due to her effervescent personality and striking good looks, Ms. Waugh never completely overcame her noticeable nervousness after taking to the air. Waugh abandoned her hosting spot upon the expiration of her contract in August 1988. She was replaced with Dawn Hayes, who had been the runner-up in the lottery host competition. Hayes, who was equally as appealing but with a polished, confident on-air presence, began her long run as host during this era.

During Lottery Live's entire run on channel 7, the daily Numbers Game drawing aired at 7:52 p.m. (following the conclusion of the "Double Jeopardy!" round of Jeopardy!), while the specialty game of the evening (e.g., Mass Ca$h) originally aired during the CBS prime time lineup at 9:50 p.m. (retaining the airtime the specialty games had on WBZ). From 1991 until the end of channel 7's lottery contract in 1994, the specialty games were moved down to a 7:58 p.m. airtime, following the closing credits of Jeopardy!. Weekend lottery hosts during the channel 7 era included Linda Ward, Linda Frantangela (both prior to 1993) and Jill Stark (1993–94), who all substituted on weekdays as well when Hayes was absent. WNEV/WHDH also aired prime time game show specials produced by the Massachusetts State Lottery, usually a few times a year, that were broadcast either from the station's studios at 7 Bulfinch Place or at other public venues across Boston.

The lottery commission saw tremendous growth during this period, increasing its sales to record highs, promoting further advertising and expanding its game roster (Mass Ca$h, which launched in 1991, was added to the already successful lineup of The Numbers Game and specialty games Megabuck$ and Mass Millions). Channel 7's nightly broadcasts of Lottery Live and the periodic sweepstakes specials were integral in fielding this success for the lottery; this, combined with Lottery Live pulling in high ratings as a part of the Wheel of Fortune/Jeopardy! hour, which ranked first place in 7 p.m. to 8 p.m. prime access, caused the station to renew the lottery contract for another three years in 1990. After the sale to Sunbeam in 1993, WHDH's contract with the lottery was not renewed, despite continued success on the station. Lottery rights were subsequently picked up by WCVB, which began airing the nightly drawings on March 7, 1994. The Lottery Live format moved to its third consecutive station, with Dawn Hayes being retained as host by WCVB.

=== Sports programming ===
WHDH became the primary station for the New England Patriots in 1995, as the Patriots played in the American Football Conference of the NFL, which had a deal with NBC for the network to air AFC games (thus Boston was not as important a market for Fox in regard to getting a VHF affiliate). When the AFC package moved to CBS in 1998, this role was reclaimed by WBZ-TV. From 2006 to 2016, the station aired Patriots games when they were featured on NBC Sunday Night Football (the station aired the Patriots' Super Bowl XLIX victory in 2015 and their Super Bowl XLVI appearance in 2012). Also, WHDH aired selected Red Sox games from 1990 to 1993 as a CBS station via that network's MLB over-the-air broadcast contract, and again through NBC's limited rights to MLB's postseason from 1995 to 2000. WNEV/WHDH has also aired Boston Celtics games, first via CBS' broadcast contract with the NBA from 1982 to 1990 (continuing what WNAC-TV had aired since 1973; their NBA Finals victories in 1984 and 1986 were aired on WNEV), and again through NBC from 1995 to 2002. From 2006 to 2016, the station also aired Boston Bruins games via the NHL on NBC, including their victory in the 2011 Stanley Cup Finals.

Between 1992 and 2016, WHDH aired a total of twelve Olympic Games; the first two events in 1992 and 1994 were aired while the station was affiliated with CBS, with the remaining ten games airing while the station was affiliated with NBC (WBZ-TV aired its last Olympic broadcast in 1998).

In 2025, WHDH reached an agreement to air four Boston Red Sox spring training games during the 2025 season. The games streamed on NESN 360.

=== News operation ===
WHDH presently broadcasts 77 1/2 hours of locally produced newscasts each week (with 12 hours, 35 minutes each weekday; 6 hours, 35 minutes on Saturdays; and eight hours on Sundays). In addition, the station produces Urban Update, a discussion program focusing on issues affecting the area's Black community, and Honda Sports Xtra, a weekly half-hour sports highlight program. The station operates a Bell LongRanger 206L news helicopter named "Sky 7". The station's weather radar is presented on-air as "Storm Scan Doppler" with a signal coming from the radar at the National Weather Service local forecast office in Taunton.

==== Media partnerships ====
The station, in partnership with MetroNetworks, launched the TrafficTracker truck during the 2004 Democratic National Convention, which was held in Boston. With traffic reporter Marshall Hook behind the wheel of one of the station's live vehicles, WHDH became the only station in the market to produce live traffic reports from the road. The station continues to use the TrafficTracker during snowstorms, including the December 13, 2007, storm that resulted in paralyzing commutes that, in some cases, exceeded seven hours.

The station maintains NBC-era resource coverage agreements with other regional stations. WHDH shares its resources with WJAR, the NBC affiliate in Providence, Rhode Island, for news coverage of southeastern Massachusetts. WWLP, the NBC affiliate in Springfield, shares its resources with WHDH for news coverage of western areas of the state.

==== News department history ====
===== 1982–1993 =====
WNAC-TV had spent the better part of its history as the lowest-rated major-network affiliate in Boston, and one of the weakest large-market CBS affiliates in the country. When New England Television began operating the station, it embarked on a massive attempt to bring channel 7 out of the ratings basement. David Mugar and company soon announced the infamous "dream team" of newscasters, headed by Tom Ellis and Robin Young. Ellis had previously maintained WBZ-TV's dominance in the news market, and then helped WCVB reach #1 in the ratings during his tenure there from 1978 to 1982. Young, on the other hand, had no hard news experience but was well-known to Boston viewers as former co-host of Evening Magazine. The new partnership, as well as the completely restructured news department as a whole, received heavy promotion in the months leading to the official launch of the finalized WNEV news product (accompanied by a launch image campaign, "There's A New Day Dawning"). The newsroom facility, built feverishly over the summer of 1982, was cited by The Boston Globe as being the most technologically advanced out of all three network stations in the market. There was considerable reporting on the high salaries (a total of roughly $1 million a year) the new station was offering Ellis and Young. On the night of Ellis and Young's debut, September 13, 1982, WNEV beat WCVB and WBZ in the evening news ratings. The curiosity of Boston viewers only lasted a week in large numbers; the following week, channel 7 crumbled back to a distant third.

WNEV's news department underwent more shakeups, both in talent and identity, due to ongoing sagging ratings. WNEV's inaugural station manager, Winthrop "Win" Baker, and his news director Bill Applegate were both fired in May 1983. Replacing Baker was former WBZ-TV programming head Sy Yanoff, whom Mugar had the utmost confidence in given his track record at channel 4 (both Ellis and Young had worked for Yanoff at separate times, years earlier, at channel 4; this was a major factor in him taking the job). Yanoff quickly brought former WBZ-TV news director Jeff Rosser to the same post at channel 7, with a five-year contract. Over the summer, the two fired quite a few of the 1982 "dream team" hires, in an effort to strengthen and better utilize the talents that worked. The largest issue they faced was the public perception that Young and Ellis were a mismatched anchor team. Young, whose informal presence began to contrast severely with the seriousness of Ellis, was offered new avenues at WNEV by Yanoff so that the station could boast a more balanced, serious lead anchor team. Although she had stated in the spring of 1983 that she was at the anchor desk for the long haul, Young made a move with Yanoff and Mugar that July which granted her airtime on WNEV for prime time specials produced through her private production company, Young Visions. Young decided that leaving the news department would allow her more time to focus on these specials, as well as the availability to be an all-purpose station personality.

During that summer, as Young geared up to vacate her anchor position, Yanoff and Rosser named four possible successors, including KNXT reporter Terry Murphy (later of Hard Copy fame) and WNEV's own reporter Diane Willis, who had been among the station's new hires the previous year. Willis was selected for the position in early September, and began anchoring with Tom Ellis that same month. Young, meanwhile, went on to host her prime time specials and events until 1987.

In the spring of 1984, NETV moved its on-air news look away from the changes made only two years prior, taking away the anchoring desk from the newsroom and utilizing a backdrop allowing chroma keys and CGI graphics to be placed. WNEV also began a network of regional news bureaus known as the New England News Exchange, in which WNEV consulted with other stations (such as WCSH-TV in Portland, WLBZ-TV in Bangor, WFSB in Hartford, WLNE-TV in Providence and WMUR-TV in Manchester) and print media throughout the region to create a high-powered electronic news gathering organization. Despite a continued massive influx of capital and marketing (including a highly financed promotional campaign employing the refrain "Feel Good About That"), and more positive reviews of the station's newscasts following the appointment of Willis as lead anchor, WNEV still failed to take the competition by storm.

In the spring of 1986, Yanoff and Rosser announced that they would try a second lead anchor team for the weeknight 11 p.m. newscasts in the fall. They planned to keep Ellis and Willis on at 6 p.m., while giving the 11 p.m. slot to weekend anchor/reporter Kate Sullivan and Dave Wright, an incoming newsman hired away from ATV in the Canadian Maritimes. However, when Rosser had a meeting with Willis for what was supposed to be her contract renewal, he was told by her that instead, she would be leaving to become a professor of journalism at Northeastern University. Willis and Rosser publicly announced her resignation in July, and Willis assured the staff that her decision to leave WNEV was isolated from her soon-to-be decreased air time. Ellis, on the other hand, was unhappy about his reduction, feeling that he was no longer being considered the station's principal anchor. Yanoff and Rosser attempted to come to agreeable terms with Ellis, with two proposed plans—to either pair him with Kate Sullivan or Dave Wright, or to find him another replacement female anchor. It was purported that WNEV was even in discussions with by-then-former NBC anchor Linda Ellerbee for her to become Ellis' co-anchor. The anchor replacement and Wright-Ellis pairing ideas were ultimately nixed (by the 1980s, the idea of two men anchoring together was passe), with Sullivan and Wright taking over both the 6 p.m. and 11 p.m. newscasts in September. Ellis was demoted to reporter, a move that ultimately led to his exit from the station altogether in early December 1986.

In August 1987, numerous changes occurred when R.D. Sahl, who had been WNEV's noon anchor on weekdays, joined Kate Sullivan as her new partner on weeknights (Sahl had filled in for Wright on numerous occasions during 1986 and 1987, and heavily in the summer of 1987 when Wright was recovering from a heart attack). At the same time, WNEV became the first Boston station to launch a 5 p.m. newscast, which was anchored by Dave Wright and Diana Williams. The Live at Five hour of the news was a cross between the informality of WBZ's competing Live on 4 and WNEV's regular newscasts, without the lifestyle and specialty features seen on Live on 4. However, there was a unique twist. Wright, who had created the Live at Five format at ATV (where he had hosted it from 1982 to 1986), brought the concept to WNEV, which had him and Williams walking around a special newsroom set sans an anchor desk as they presented stories. Featured reporters were seated at assignment desks on the set, as they contributed to the fray and chatted with Wright and Williams. The format soared in the ratings, a true accomplishment long labored by NETV. Ultimately, the news program's producers started feuding, and Wright, who felt caught in the middle, resigned from WNEV in May 1988. Just prior to Wright's departure, Jeff Rosser had left the station at the close of his contract, and arriving in his place was former WCVB news director Jim Thistle. By September 1988, the Live at Five format was dropped (as it remained the intellectual property of ATV), and the 5 p.m. to 6 p.m. block was restructured as a more conventional newscast, anchored by Williams and Lester Strong. After Williams departed for WABC-TV in 1990 (where she remains to this day), Strong anchored with new arrival Edye Tarbox in the 5 p.m. hour.

Besides the locally prominent journalists who attempted to leverage WNEV's news, a few future national talents had brief stints at the station in the 1980s. Bill O'Reilly, long before his national exposure on Inside Edition and Fox News Channel's The O'Reilly Factor, co-anchored NEWSE7EN Weekend in 1982–83. Soon after, O'Reilly also became the host of the station's weekday afternoon talk/lifestyle program, New England Afternoon (which replaced the ill-fated two-hour magazine show Look, canceled after its first season). His successor on the weekend newscast was Paula Zahn, since a newswoman of many television networks, who co-anchored with Lester Strong from 1983 to 1985. Rehema Ellis, who joined the station in 1985 as a general assignment reporter, eventually left to become an NBC News national correspondent in 1994. From May to November 1988, future Today host Matt Lauer hosted WNEV's mid-morning talk show Talk of the Town. Two more WNEV/WHDH alumni would then hit the big time: reporter Miles O'Brien, a 1987 arrival to the station, left to join CNN in 1989. Edye Tarbox, now E.D. Hill, who was an anchor/reporter at WHDH from 1990 to 1992, later worked at Fox News Channel from 1999 to 2008.

Tom Ellis, who had been dethroned of the male lead anchor position at the station in 1986, came full circle when Inside Edition Extra, a companion series to the syndicated program Inside Edition, appeared on WHDH's fall 1992 daytime schedule. Ellis had been named the host of IE Extra, which was a co-production of WHDH-TV and King World Productions; Ellis, thus, was employed by Boston's channel 7 yet again, albeit for the national show. IE Extra, which was broadcast from the same New York City studio as Inside Edition, and aired in most markets after its parent series as part of an hour-long IE block (WHDH aired the shows back-to-back at 4 p.m.). Ellis also appeared following his former WNEV colleague, Bill O'Reilly, who had been anchoring Inside Edition since 1989. The scheduling only lasted a year, as Inside Edition Extra was canceled at the end of the 1992–93 season. This program has no relation to the current Extra, a Warner Bros.-produced entertainment magazine that premiered in the fall of 1994, and has aired on WHDH since 1999.

===== 1993–present =====
There were abrupt changes when Sunbeam bought the station in 1993. New station owner Ed Ansin brought Joel Cheatwood, the creator of WSVN's fast-paced news format, to Boston. Cheatwood introduced a considerably watered-down version of the WSVN format. However, it was still shocking by Boston standards. Prior to the debut of the new format and 7 News identity that November, Ansin and Cheatwood began changing anchor lineups: in mid October 1993, Margie Reedy was moved from the main evening newscasts to the Noon and 5:30 p.m. newscasts. Rehema Ellis was promoted to female lead anchor (at 6 p.m. and 11 p.m.) with R.D. Sahl. However, many of the crew's doubts about the new, impending tabloid style were realized once the format switch was off and running.

More changes were in store concerning the look of the newscasts. Compared to the previous look of WHDH, which used soft, varied colors, both the default "dotted 7" logo and a more colorful version, a light theme (Advantage by Frank Gari, originally commissioned for WFSB in Hartford, Connecticut), and announcer Chris Clausen; WHDH's new look was far different, incorporating dark blue, red, black, and silver. The "dotted 7" logo was succeeded by WSVN's version of the "circle 7" logo. The graphics initially used a "diagonal stripe" theme, soon after these graphics were replaced with a new set which incorporated glass panels. The theme ("7 News", composed by Chris Crane, who has made various news themes that have been used by WSVN since 1991) was also quite different, made up of dissonant, droning synth chords. The music evolved in later years, incorporating the NBC chimes, as well as a more orchestral sound. The set was also steadily integrated into the newsroom, much like WSVN's had been (taking a cue from CNN); the resulting set/newsroom hybrid was, like at WSVN, dubbed the Newsplex. It continues, and has been gradually updated over the years to reflect the graphical and technological updates done by the station. Chris Clausen was replaced by Scott Chapin, who was the announcer for WSVN since 1988; he continued to announce for both stations until January 2, 2011, when he was replaced by Paul Turner. Chapin returned to WHDH on December 29, 2014, three years after he was replaced. A similar format was adopted by KJRH-TV in Tulsa, Oklahoma between 1994 and 1997.

Most of the station's prominent newscasters wanted nothing to do with Cheatwood (who had a reputation as a pioneer in tabloid television). Ellis was one of the first to leave WHDH in response to Ansin's changes. Only two months into her promotion to lead anchor, Ellis declared herself a free agent, quickly accepting an offer at NBC News as a national correspondent. She signed off from WHDH shortly after Christmas and began at NBC on January 1, 1994. R.D. Sahl was then sole anchor of the 6 p.m. and 11 p.m. newscasts, with fill-in anchors from other station positions joining him periodically. In January 1994, the station reinstated a weekday morning newscast, which NETV had cut a few years earlier due to the financial constraints. Sunbeam hired two new anchors, Kim Khazei and Gerry Grant, to helm the broadcast, titled 7 News Morning Edition. Originally airing from 5 a.m. to 7 a.m., the newscast expanded by an additional two hours to 9 a.m. when WHDH dropped the low-rated CBS This Morning in late February. At the same time, Sunbeam restored the 5 p.m. newscast cut by NETV.

During this time, Sahl became quite vocal of his displeasure with the new tabloid format, and it was clear that he was looking for a way out of his contract as well. Cheatwood soon hired Kim Carrigan, a transplant from Des Moines, Iowa, who first appeared as female lead anchor alongside Sahl in April 1994. Sunbeam was confident that Carrigan, the 31-year-old newcomer, and the 46-year-old Sahl, by now a trusted Boston news veteran, would be the lasting lead anchor team for them, but in late July 1994, Sahl met with his legal counsel and came to an agreement over the termination of his WHDH contract. Sahl made his final appearance on 7 News in early August. Carrigan, who was quickly gaining a following, then continued on alone for several weeks at a time for the next four months. This made her the first female newscaster in Boston to anchor alone in the key 5 p.m., 6 p.m., and 11 p.m. time periods. At times during the fall of 1994, Carrigan would be joined by a rotation of male co-anchors, including Lester Strong, Gerry Grant, and Jonathan Hall; however, promotions for these newscasts during this time featured Carrigan as sole anchor. Margie Reedy, meanwhile, remained on the noon and 5 p.m. newscasts until her departure that December. Both Sahl and Reedy would join NECN soon afterward, where (save for Sahl's short-lived stint at KCAL-TV in Los Angeles) they would remain for several years afterward.

When WHDH switched to NBC in January 1995, the morning newscast was scaled back to the traditional 5 a.m. to 7 a.m. timeslot in order to accommodate Today; a few months later, it was renamed from 7 News Morning Edition to the current Today in New England. Later in January, as a result of a package deal WHDH had signed the previous fall, the station saw the arrival of husband-and-wife anchors John Marler and Cathy Marshall. Marler, a longtime anchor at WAGA-TV in Atlanta, joined Kim Carrigan at 5 p.m., 6 p.m., and 11 p.m. Marshall, who had been a CNN anchor, was originally unclear as to what her role with 7 News would be, but ultimately became Margie Reedy's replacement at Noon and the 5 p.m. hour, beside Lester Strong. These two anchoring teams remained in place for the next three years. Gerry Grant departed from the morning newscast in February 1995 to join the reporting staff of Entertainment Tonight; he was replaced that April by Alison Gilman. Former WBZ-TV anchor Randy Price, who had joined WHDH in 1996, first as a freelance reporter and then as a weekday morning anchor (taking over from the departing Gilman in February 1997), replaced Marler at 5 p.m., 6 p.m., and 11 p.m. in August 1998.

Channel 7, which for several years had already begun a tradition of scheduling news in (previously) untraditional time periods, broke further ground again with the addition of a half-hour 4 p.m. newscast in June 1996, which gave Strong and Marshall additional anchor duties. The newscast was launched when WHDH sought an alternative to its previous efforts to program the 4 p.m. time slot (including Inside Edition through the end of the 1993–94 season, A Current Affair from September 1994 to January 1996 and finally, the WSVN-produced Deco Drive, the latter two programs of which had underperformed for the station). The 4 p.m. newscast was originally separated from the existing early evening news block by Hard Copy, and later by Extra after Hard Copy ended its run in September 1999; after Extra moved to 7:30 p.m. in September 2001, WHDH launched a 4:30 p.m. newscast (the second in Boston, after a newscast on WFXT that launched three months earlier).

The fast-paced Sunbeam news format rejuvenated WHDH's ratings, especially after switching to NBC. For most of the last decade, WHDH has waged a spirited battle for first place, behind long-dominant WCVB. In 2002, WHDH was noted as having the best newscast in the U.S. in a study published by the Columbia Journalism Review. In previous studies, the station was deemed as having one of the worst newscasts. On December 19, 2006, WHDH took over production of WLVI's nightly 10 p.m. newscast (after Sunbeam's purchase of the station resulted in the shutdown of channel 56's in-house news department). On February 29, 2008, it was reported that the 2007–2008 Writers Guild of America strike caused a significant loss in viewers for the station's late newscast. WHDH-TV finished at 11 p.m., with an average of 166,100 total viewers, down from 199,900 viewers in 2007.

From 1997 to 2003, WHDH's staff included field reporter Jeffery Derderian, who was a co-owner of The Station nightclub with his brother Michael. Jeffrey resigned from WHDH in February 2003 to join WPRI-TV in Providence, Rhode Island. Three days later, a fire engulfed the Station nightclub, killing 100 people.

On July 29, 2008, WHDH became the second station in Boston (after WCVB-TV) to begin broadcasting its newscasts in high definition. On that day, revised graphics, music, and an updated newsplex also made their debut. During the transition, the station's newscasts were conducted in front of a green screen showing the former newsplex while renovations to that set were being done. On August 22, 2011, WHDH launched an hour-long 9 a.m. newscast, which replaced Live with Regis and Kelly after it moved from WHDH to WCVB-TV. Originally slated to premiere on September 12, 2011, the launch date of the newscast was moved up three weeks to August 22, 2011. Live, which had aired on the station since it premiered nationally in 1988, moved to WCVB on the latter date, airing directly opposite the WHDH newscast.

Following the station's decision on August 16, 2016, to drop its objection to the loss of the NBC affiliation at the end of the year, WHDH announced that it would add additional local newscasts; following this expansion, channel 7 would broadcast over 87 hours of newscasts a week. The expansion led to the hiring of 30 new staffers. The Boston Globe reported that the station would also introduce a new news set in September 2016.

==== Notable current on-air staff ====
- Hank Phillippi Ryan – investigative reporter

==== Notable former on-air staff ====
- Joe Amorosino – sports reporter (1998–2003)
- Pete Bouchard – meteorologist
- Dave Briggs – sports reporter (2004–2008)
- David Brudnoy – commentator (1982–1983)
- Liz Callaway – co-host of RTG: Ready To Go
- Liz Claman – anchor/reporter (1994–2000)
- John Dennis – sports anchor (1982–1997)
- Julie Donaldson – sports reporter (2008)
- Dylan Dreyer – meteorologist (2007–2012)
- Jack Edwards – sports reporter/anchor (1988–1991)
- Sara Edwards – arts and entertainment reporter (1991–2003)
- Rehema Ellis – anchor/reporter (1985–1994)
- Tom Ellis – anchor (1982–1986)
- Sarah French – anchor (2011–2017)
- Bob Gallagher – sports anchor
- Jeff Glor – anchor/reporter
- Todd Gross – chief meteorologist (1984–2005)
- Darren M. Haynes – sports anchor (2012–2013)
- Kim Khazei – anchor (1994–2001, 2007–2025)
- Janet Langhart – special features reporter ("Janet Langhart's Special People" on NEWSE7EN, 1982–1983)
- Matt Lauer – Talk of the Town host (1988)
- Gene Lavanchy – sports anchor (1993–2003)
- Harvey Leonard – chief meteorologist (1977–2002)
- Rhett Lewis – sports anchor/reporter (2009–2014)
- Cathy Marshall – anchor (1995–1998)
- Mish Michaels – meteorologist (1992–1999)
- Wendi Nix – sports anchor (2002–2006)
- Miles O'Brien – reporter (1987–1989)
- Bill O'Reilly – weekend anchor (1982–1983), host of New England Afternoon (1983–1984)
- Ryan Owens – reporter (2001–2006)
- Frances Rivera – anchor/reporter and "The Dish" reporter (2001–2011)
- Chuck Scarborough
- Mike Taibbi – investigative reporter (1982–1983)
- Edye Tarbox – anchor/reporter (1990–1992)
- Diana Williams – anchor (1987–1990)
- Diane Willis – anchor/reporter (1982–1986)
- Robin Young – anchor (1982–1983), host of specials and public affairs (1983–1987)
- Paula Zahn – anchor/reporter (1983–1985)

== Technical information and subchannels ==
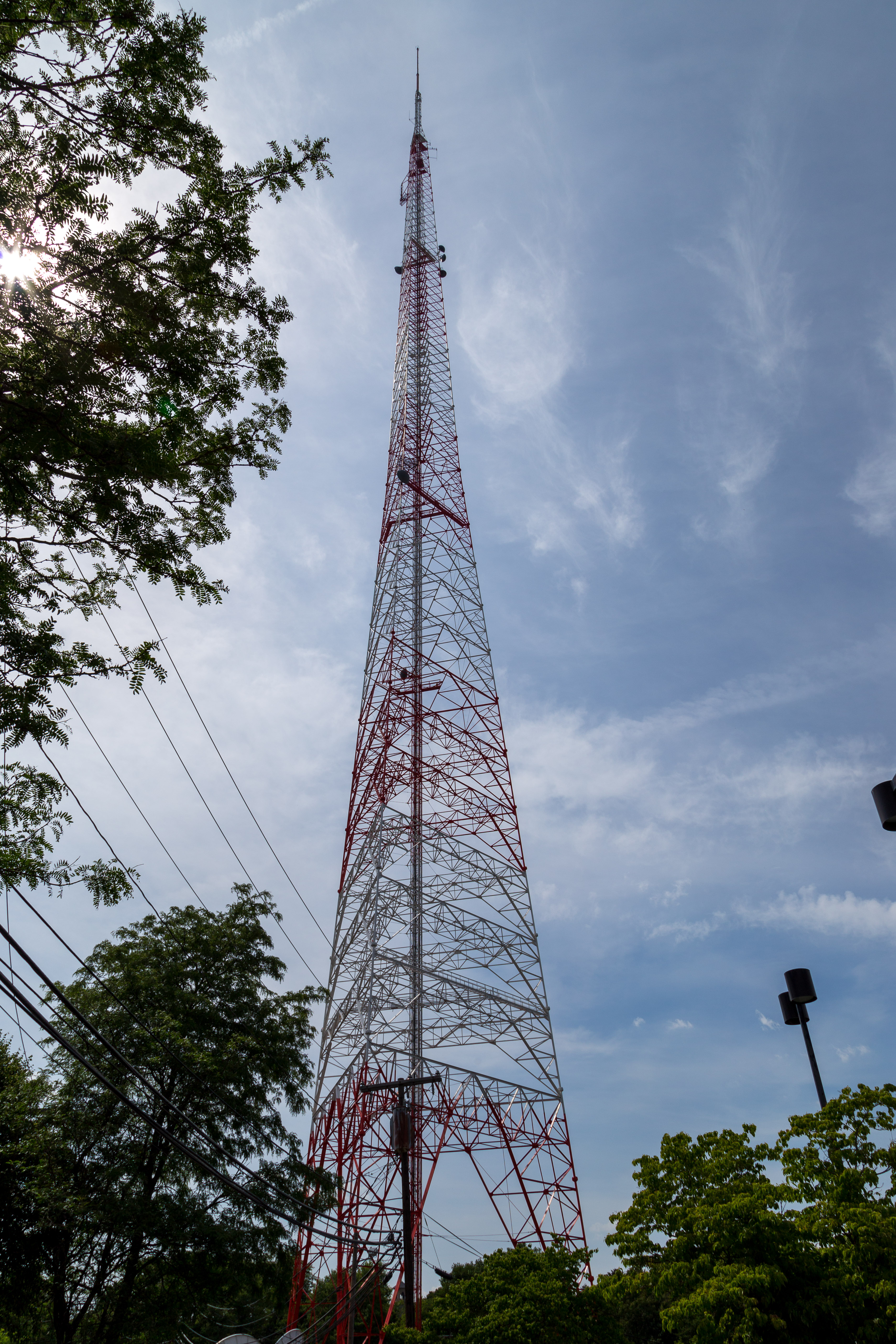
The WHDH tower in Newton

WHDH and WLVI broadcast from a tower in Newton, Massachusetts. The stations' signals are multiplexed:

Subchannels of WHDH and WLVI
| License | Subchannel | Res. | Short name | Programming |
|---|---|---|---|---|
| WHDH | 7.1 | 1080i | WHDH | Independent |
| WHDH | 7.2 | 480i | DEFY | Defy |
| WLVI | 56.1 | 1080i | WLVI | The CW |
| WLVI | 56.2 | 480i | BUZZR | Buzzr (4:3) |

Digital subchannel 7.2 originally carried NBC Weather Plus starting in May 2006, until NBC discontinued the network in November 2008. On February 2, 2009, WHDH-DT2 began carrying programming from This TV. Via digital cable, channel 7.2 is offered on Comcast channel 936 and Verizon FiOS channel 460.

=== Analog-to-digital conversion ===
WHDH shut down its analog signal, over VHF channel 7 on June 12, 2009, the official date on which full-power television stations in the United States transitioned from analog to digital broadcasts under federal mandate. The station's digital signal relocated from its pre-transition UHF channel 42 to VHF channel 7.

Because of a large number of complaints regarding the inability of viewers to receive over-the-air programming on channel 7, WHDH requested and received temporary authority from the FCC on June 16, 2009, to simulcast its programming on UHF channel 42, in addition to VHF channel 7. Although stations in other major markets have similar problems, WHDH is the only station in the Boston area market which changed its digital channel due to the June 2009 transition, requiring a channel map rescan to receive the station. WHDH was also one of three area stations, along with WMUR-TV (channel 9) and WWDP (channel 46), to broadcast in VHF post-transition, requiring either a traditional indoor antenna within Boston proper, or in outer areas at minimum an outdoor antenna.

On September 15, 2009, the FCC issued a Report & Order, approving WHDH's move from channel 7 to channel 42. After the station filed its minor change application for a construction permit, stating the channel move, on November 9, 2009, WHDH terminated operations on VHF channel 7 and now permanently operates solely on channel 42 (mapping to virtual channel 7 via PSIP). The equipment for the channel 7 digital transmitter was shipped to Miami for use by sister station WSVN, which continues to broadcast on VHF 7 with few complaints due to South Florida's less-varied terrain. On June 1, 2010, WHDH filed an application to operate at the power level of 1 million watts. The application was approved on December 14, 2010.

The station shifted to physical channel 35 in the late-2010s spectrum allocation, with Sunbeam selling WLVI's spectrum and placing that station in a channel sharing agreement with WHDH, which started on January 8, 2018, with the move to 35 occurring in 2019.

== Coverage in Canada ==
WHDH was one of six Boston area television stations that are carried on Canadian providers Bell Satellite TV and Bell Fibe TV and was authorized as an American over-the-air station eligible for national distribution. It was also available via the Anik F1 satellite to several Canadian cable providers, particularly in Atlantic Canada. Other cable systems also carried WHDH, such as Citizens Cable Television in the Thousand Islands region of New York State and Bermuda CableVision.

WYCN-LD (as WBTS-LD) was authorized to provide NBC service over Canadian pay-TV on December 20, 2016. Most providers carrying WHDH, including Bell Canada-owned providers and Eastlink, replaced it with WBTS effective January 1, 2017, coinciding with end of WHDH's NBC affiliation; despite this, as of December 22, 2020, WHDH remains on the Canadian Radio-television and Telecommunications Commission (CRTC)'s list of eligible non-Canadian services and stations that can be distributed in the country.

== See also ==
- Channel 7 virtual TV stations in the United States
- Channel 35 digital TV stations in the United States
- List of television stations in Massachusetts
- List of United States stations available in Canada
