= Clyde Lee (newscaster) =

American newscaster (born 1949)

- Born: Clyde Lee; 1949 (age 76–77)
- Education: University of Kentucky
- Spouse: Diane Willis
- Children: Whitney Lee

Clyde Lee (born 1949) is an American newscaster who developed his career primarily in Indianapolis.

== Career ==
Lee attended University of Kentucky, for a short time until he began working for the local educational radio station on campus as a freshman subsequently dropping out of school. Within the next year he began working for two commercial radio stations and a television station. Clyde Lee did not graduate from UK. Lee next worked at TV stations in Paducah and Lexington and Tupelo, Mississippi; then moved to Memphis, where he co-anchored early and late evening newscasts. He joined WRTV in Indianapolis in August 1976, teaming up in most of his tenure with Howard Caldwell and Diane Willis, but he also anchored with Martha Weaver and Barbara Lewis. He resigned from WRTV in August 2001. With Willis, Lee began a new consultant firm named Lee-Willis Communications, specializing in public relations, crisis communications, and training corporate executives to deal with the media. This firm experienced a mild controversy when WRTV reported that its former anchors had received $30,000 from a high school to make public relations. The school not only hired them, but also several other small public relation companies. The contracts were ended with all due to budgetary reasons.

== Personal life ==
Lee is three times divorced. He was married to Deborah Conkwright in September 1972 in Lexington, Kentucky. They lived in Lexington; Tupelo, Mississippi; Paducah, Kentucky; and Memphis, Tennessee. Lee divorced Deborah in 1974. He married Gennie Goode in March 1975, and the couple moved to Indiana. They had one child in 1977. Gennie divorced Lee in 1991. Lee then married a prominent Indianapolis attorney, Linda Pence. She divorced him after two years. Lee then married his former co-anchor Diane Willis in January 2000.
