= Mish Michaels =

American meteorologist (1968–2022)

Mishelle 'Mish' Michaels (born Anuradha Mukherjee, 1968 – March 14, 2022) was an American broadcast meteorologist, environmental reporter, and author.

== Life and career ==
Michaels was born in Kolkata, India. She earned a B.S. in meteorology from Cornell, and an Ed.M. from Harvard.

Michaels worked at WMUR-TV (Manchester, NH), WHDH (Boston), and The Weather Channel. She joined WBZ-TV in September 2001 and left in July 2009 to spend time raising her children and write books. In late 2010, she contributed to the book, Extreme New England Weather written by Josh Judge, with her story of a deadly microburst in Stratham, New Hampshire, in 1991.

On January 31, 2017, Michaels announced via Twitter her employment with WGBH as a science reporter. On February 8, 2017, it was made public that she had been fired from the position before even one broadcast could occur as she "...has been outspoken in her controversial belief that vaccines cause autism..." as well as a disbelief in man-made climate change. Michaels later disputed these claims on her personal website.

Her family announced her death at age 53 during the week of March 16, 2022, giving no cause of death.
