= Kim Khazei =

American broadcast journalist

- Born: 1959 (age 66–67)
- Occupations: TV news anchor and journalist
- Known for: news anchor for 7News Boston WHDH-TV
- Spouse: Scott A. Huff
- Children: Hayden, Walker, and Tatum
- Relatives: Alan Khazei (cousin)

Kim Khazei is an American former news anchor for 7News Boston on WHDH-TV and its sister station WLVI-TV (CW56).

== Career ==
Kim Khazei began her TV career at KOMU-TV in Columbia, Missouri, then worked for four years at KQTV in Missouri as an evening anchor and reporter.

She became an evening news anchor for the NBC affiliates in Champaign, Illinois and later went to work at KOVR-TV in Sacramento, California as an anchor and reporter.

Khazei came to Channel 7 in Boston, Massachusetts in January 1994 at the time when Sunbeam Television Corporation took over the station and introduced a "fast-paced, graphics-driven, and aggressive brand of local news" to the Boston market. She worked for the station's morning show and co-anchored the debut of WHDH's first 4 p.m. news.

After being on personal leave since July 2001, she resigned in September 2001 to dedicate her full-time to raise her children and be with her husband and family. In August 2007, she returned to her duties at WHDH-TV.

She left WHDH-TV on December 19, 2025 to be closer with her family.

== Personal life ==
Khazei is married to Scott A. Huff, a Bowling Green State University alumnus and a division manager for a medical technology company, and they have three children, Hayden (born 1994), Walker, and Tatum. They live in Winchester, Massachusetts.

She is also the cousin of Massachusetts social entrepreneur and politician, Alan Khazei.
