= Joe Amorosino =

American sportscaster

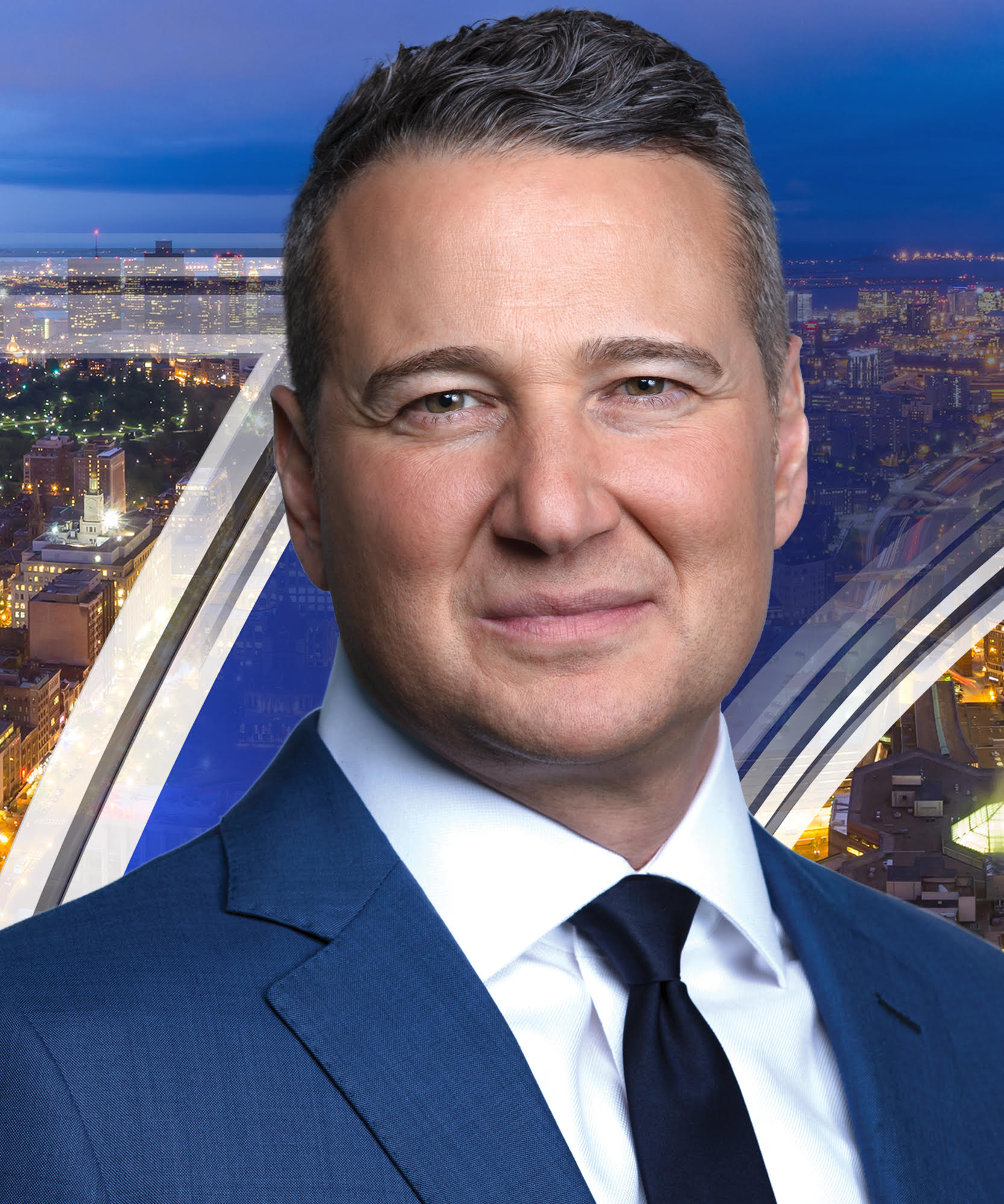
American Sportscaster Joe Amorosino | 7News WHDH

Joe Amorosino (born July 19, 1969) is an American sportscaster who is known for his long tenure at WHDH-TV, 7News in Boston, from 1998 to 2023. He is an Emmy Award-winning sports reporter, who was named Massachusetts Sportscaster of Year in 2016 and 2020 by the National Sports Media Association.

== Early life ==
Amorosino was born in Quincy, Massachusetts, and grew up in the neighboring town of Braintree. He is a 1988 graduate of Don Bosco High School in Boston and a 1992 graduate of Boston University College of Communication.

== Broadcasting career ==
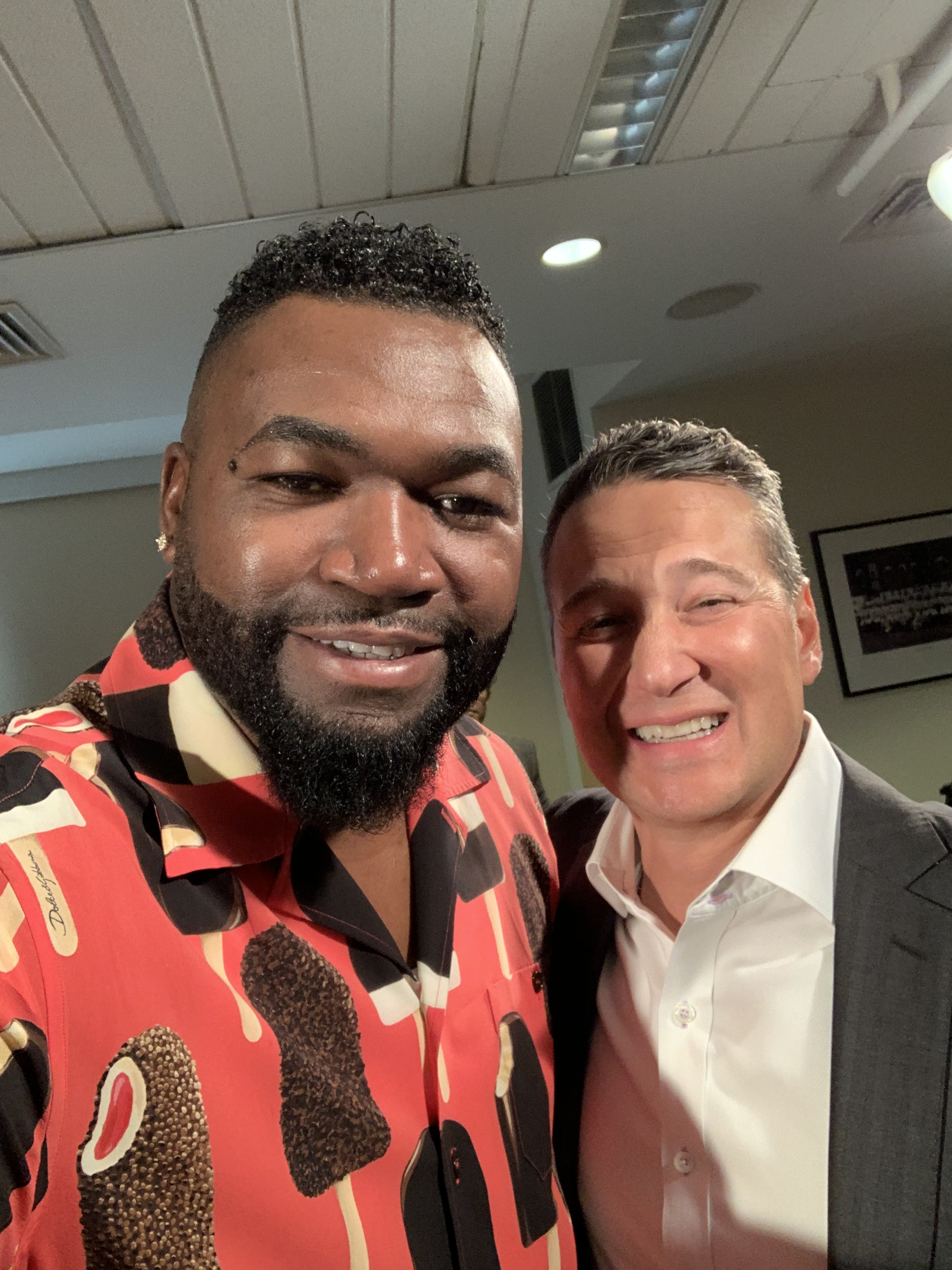
Amorosino and David Ortiz of the Boston Red Sox

Amorosino's sportscasting career began as the sports director/anchor for Cape 11 News in Yarmouth, Massachusetts, in January 1995, where he covered local sports and the Cape Cod Baseball League, which features the top college baseball players in the country each summer. His next stop was WPRI-TV in Providence, Rhode Island, where he was weekend sports anchor/reporter. He spent less than two years in Providence before joining WHDH-TV, 7News in Boston in March 1998 as a sports reporter and was named weekend sports anchor three years later in March 2001. Amorosino was named 7NEWS sports director/anchor in July 2003. He also hosted the weekly sports show "Sports Xtra" on Sunday nights and managed the 7NEWS sports department.

Amorosino is an Emmy Award-winning sports reporter who covered six New England Patriots Super Bowl wins (2001, 2003, 2004, 2014, 2016, 2018) four Boston Red Sox World Series wins (2004, 2007, 2013, 2018), the Boston Celtics NBA Championship (2008) and the Boston Bruins Stanley Cup Championship (2011). His 2003 interview with P. J. Stock received national attention when what was supposed to be an instructional story on fighting in the National Hockey League resulted in an unplanned brawl between Amorosino and Stock.

As the studio host for NBC Boston’s Olympic Zone, Amorosino covered the Olympic Games in Torino 2006, Beijing 2008, Vancouver 2010, London 2012, Sochi 2014 and Brazil 2016.

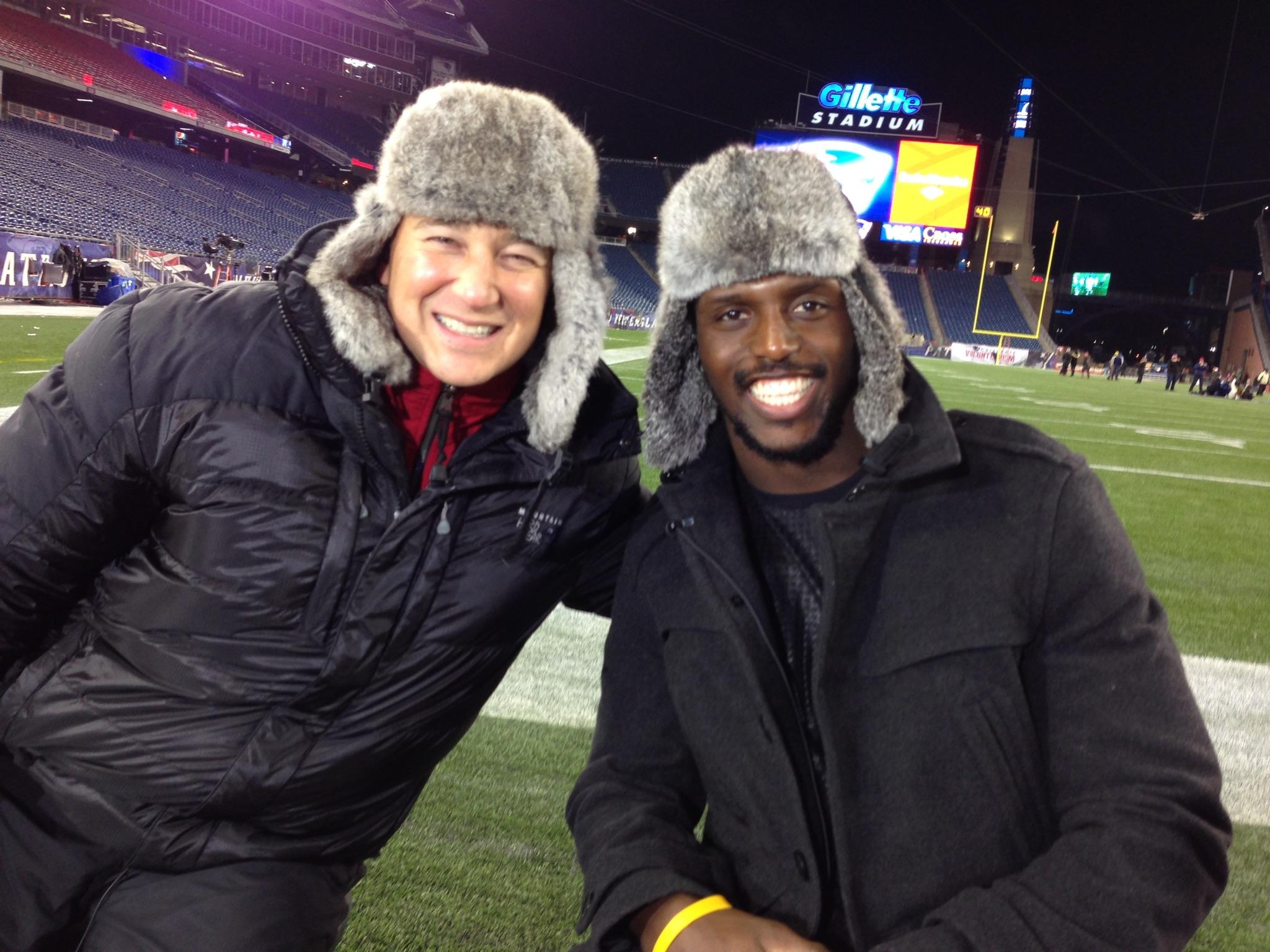
Joe Amorosino and Devin McCourty of the New England Patriots at Gillette Stadium in Foxboro, Massachusetts.

Amorosino was the New England Patriots national reporter for NBC Sports Football Night in America during the 2006 NFL season. He has served on the Patriots Hall of Fame Nomination Committee from 2007 to present.

== Awards ==
Amorosino was named Massachusetts Sportscaster of Year in 2016 and 2020 by the National Sports Media Association. He was voted Boston’s Best Sportscaster in 2011 by Boston.com’s A-List. He was also voted Boston’s Best Sportscaster in 2010 by CityVoter Boston A-List. In September 2017, he was inducted into the National Italian-American Sports Hall of Fame — Massachusetts Chapter. He is the recipient of Boston University's prestigious “Young Alumni Council Award” for 2000.
