= Tom Ellis (journalist) =

American journalist (1932–2019)

- Born: Thomas Caswell Ellis; September 22, 1932; Walker County, Texas, U.S.
- Died: April 29, 2019 (aged 86); East Sandwich, Massachusetts, U.S.
- Education: University of Texas
- Occupation: Journalist

Thomas Caswell Ellis (September 22, 1932 – April 29, 2019) was an American television journalist. Based in Boston, he was well-known throughout New England for his tenure as anchor for three of Boston's network-affiliated stations. His career in television news spans more than 40 years.

His career included stints as a correspondent for WNBC-TV and as an anchor for WABC-TV — both in New York City, and for KONO-TV Channel 12 (now KSAT-TV) in San Antonio. His radio career included anchor/reporter duties for KVET-AM in Austin, KWED-AM in Sequin, and KONO-AM/FM in San Antonio, all in Texas.

Ellis may be the only individual in television history to anchor top-rated newscasts in three major markets: San Antonio, Boston, and New York. His newscasts in Boston all drew top ratings.

== Early life ==
Ellis was born in Walker County and raised in the Big Thicket area of Texas. He was a 1958 graduate of the University of Texas.

== Early career ==
When he was 17 Ellis worked as a sideshow barker, earning $150 per week. Ellis' first job in television came in 1951, when a producer from New York approached him to host a baseball pregame show for children sponsored by the Curtiss Candy Company. Ellis hosted the Curtis Knot Hole Gang club, a thirty-minute program before the Dallas Eagles and the Fort Worth Cats of the Texas League. He would interview local youth baseball players.

Ellis worked as a radio reporter at KWED, a 1000-watt radio station in Seguin, Texas. In 1958, the owner of KONO radio in San Antonio caught one of his broadcasts. The executive offered Ellis a news job in his San Antonio station for $100 per week. Ellis took the position after negotiating a salary of $105 a week.

== Television News ==
In 1961, Ellis got his opportunity to go on television. The anchor at Ellis' station's affiliated TV station had abruptly quit. The news director asked Ellis to fill in until a replacement could be found. Eventually, Ellis got the anchor position permanently, but he kept his radio job because the TV anchor job paid only $15 a night.

=== WBZ-TV ===
His high-profile career in New England began in July 1968, when he became the new lead anchor at WBZ-TV. He began solo, he would hold alone, partnering later with station veterans such as Jack Chase, through 1975. Ellis established himself as dependable and kept the (then) NBC affiliate at top of the Boston news ratings. He won accolades for his organization of team coverage during the 1972 presidential election and Richard Nixon's resignation in 1974. WBZ even issued political campaign-pins and bumper stickers to promote Ellis and his co-anchor Tony Pepper. They showed up all over the viewing area.

Ellis left Boston in 1975 for an offer to anchor for ABC's flagship affiliate WABC-TV in New York City. He stayed for three years. In the midst of his tenure, Ellis took on a role in the 1976 feature film Marathon Man, starring Dustin Hoffman and Laurence Olivier.

Ellis decided not to renew his contract with WABC, before he could have been considered for spots at ABC network news. Just as he was leaving in 1978, the country's top-rated and reputed ABC affiliate, WCVB-TV in Boston, heard that he was available.

=== WCVB-TV ===
WCVB offered Ellis the opportunity to return to Boston, not only with a salary to rival WABC's, but to join the anchoring duo of Chet Curtis and Natalie Jacobson, which had been taking the market. Ellis didn't think twice and signed a four-year contract. From 1978 to 1982, the lead anchor team was set up so that Ellis and Curtis would alternate (between the 6 and 11 p.m. newscasts), with Jacobson being the constant.

Ellis' return to Boston meant only better things for a station whose news department and commitment to local programming would soon garner it national attention. Although Curtis and Jacobson were responsible initially, some credit Ellis' dominance and professionalism for pushing WCVB up to a close second in the evening news ratings, right behind WBZ. Ellis' rapport with staff and viewers seemed electric. He then began anchoring alongside both Curtis and Jacobson on the 11 p.m. newscasts beginning in 1980—the catalyst for WCVB reaching first place in 1981 (WBZ, for the record, hasn't been #1 since). This victory came on the heels of the New York Times voting WCVB the "best TV station in the country." Ellis continued to attract attention and win awards for his interviews and work during key political campaigns.

In early 1982, Ellis had told management that he was renewing his contract with WCVB. That spring, however, he cut what many called an under-the-table deal with Boston's re-launched Channel 7, WNEV-TV (now WHDH), to become lead-anchor for its re-organized news department. WCVB was disappointed in losing Ellis, mainly because they did not want to break up the successful three-way-pairing he had with Curtis and Jacobson. The station needn't have worried; Curtis and Jacobson, sans Ellis, kept WCVB at the top of the Boston news wars for well more than a decade.

=== WNEV-TV ===
Ellis officially became the new lead anchor at the recently launched WNEV-TV on September 13, 1982. Along with his new co-anchor Robin Young (formerly of WBZ-TV's Evening Magazine), critics hailed him as a member of the "dream team" that would hopefully take Channel 7 out of last place. Billboard, radio and TV advertisements attempted to tap into viewers' emotions by depicting Ellis and Young as active community leaders. The promotional effort was not that much different from political campaigns that Ellis had covered so often.

Viewer curiosity boosted ratings temporarily from the "official" launch of the new WNEV newscast. The ratings, however, quickly slipped back to third place. Ellis was still seen as professional and smooth, but co-anchor Young had no prior hard news experience and appeared out of her league. Young remained as lead anchor through September 1983 while other "dream team" hires were discharged. WNEV, unwilling to give up, kept Ellis, believing that weak ratings were not his fault. Diane Willis, a WNEV reporter, was promoted to be Ellis' new co-anchor; she was more adept and experienced, and gave the team a more solid and balanced image. Despite other changes, such as new marketing campaigns, additional turnover in certain positions, and rebranding as "The New England News," it became obvious by 1984 that the "dream team" concept had backfired.

In the summer of 1986, following co-anchor Willis' resignation from the station, WNEV demoted Ellis from his lead anchor position to that of reporter. After a few months of reporting, Ellis himself resigned from WNEV in December 1986.

== Acting roles ==
The late 1980s and early 1990s were a period of transition. Ellis returned to New York briefly to anchor newscasts, but, rather by accident, stumbled onto a secondary career path when he was asked to appear as a spokesperson in a commercial for Anacin aspirin. His widely circulated Anacin ad let him dabble in acting again.

In the spring of 1989, Ellis took acting lessons at Brandeis University, and in New York where he studied voice, dialect, script analysis and advanced scene-study.

On August 11–12, 1989, after four months of lessons, Ellis made his acting debut at New York's Actors Institute "Home Brew,". Ellis would go on to play cameo roles in a number of daytime soap operas and then break back into feature films. In 1991 alone, Ellis played an FBI Agent in the John Cusack/James Spader film True Colors, and the natural role of a newscaster in 29th Street, starring Danny Aiello.

== WPIX NewsWorthy host ==
Around the time of his latest movie exposure, Ellis returned to hard news full-time to anchor/host NewsWorthy, a weekly news and analysis show produced in New York and seen nationally on Superstation WPIX.

== Return to Boston ==
On September 8, 1992, Ellis returned to Boston TV as host of Inside Edition Extra on WHDH-TV (Ch. 7).

== New England Cable News ==
By mid-1992 Ellis was back on the New England news scene for work at New England Cable News (NECN), which had launched only a few months earlier.

For nearly the next decade, Ellis was featured on weeknight newscasts, where he regained a following and gave birth to new trademarks. He collected southwestern cowboy hats, and wore many of them on the air. His hiring launched what some would cite as a trend for regional news channel; its employment of the elder statesmen of Boston TV news, who had left the network affiliated broadcast stations where they had made their names. Following Ellis to NECN were Margie Reedy (formerly of Detroit's WDIV and Boston's WHDH-TV, the former WNEV), R.D. Sahl (who was Reedy's partner at WHDH, who co-anchored with her yet again on NECN and the channel's produced 10pm newscast for WSBK), Maryanne Kane, and Chet Curtis, who joined in 2001 after a well-publicized divorce from Natalie Jacobson and departure from WCVB.

By 2000, Ellis was anchoring weekend newscasts only.

In December 2008, Ellis left NECN.

Ellis received numerous awards for his work, including the prestigious Emmy and Peabody awards.

== Death ==
Ellis died of cancer, aged 86, at his home in East Sandwich, Massachusetts.
