= Lester Strong =

American television anchor

Lester Strong (born Lester Franklin Strong, circa 1949) was a reporter and news anchor at WHDH-TV from June 1984 until 2000. He was also the host of a public affairs show called Urban Update.

== Personal life ==
A native of Braddock, Pennsylvania, Strong holds a Bachelor of Arts degree in English literature from Davidson College in Davidson, North Carolina. He graduated from Columbia Business School's Institute for Nonprofit Management.

On July 16, 2006, Strong married Patrice Courtney.

== Broadcast career ==
Prior to his tenure at WHDH, he was the morning and noon news anchor at WSB-TV in Atlanta. His other positions included executive producer and special projects director. He was community affairs director from January 1975 until June 1977,

From September 1978-June 1980, Strong was a program development and community affairs director at WBTV in Charlotte, North Carolina. It was there that he had his first broadcasting job as host of The Lester Strong Show. He worked for ABC in New York as east coast manager of children's programs June 1977-September 1978.

Strong started as a general assignment reporter at Boston CBS affiliate WNEV-TV, present-day WHDH, in June 1984, becoming the weekend co-anchor one month later and co-anchor of the noon broadcast in August 1986. He remained the noon co-anchor for eight years. Beginning in May 1988, Strong anchored in the 5-6 p.m. hour, and remained the 5:30 p.m. anchor when the 5:00 news slot was cancelled in 1991. In 1994, after WHDH was sold to current owner Sunbeam Television, Strong was brought back to the relaunched 5 p.m. newscast, and left the noon slot at this time. In June 1996, he was also added to the station's brand new 4 p.m. newscast. He would anchor the 4-4:30 and 5-5:30 time slots until his departure from WHDH in 2000. Under Sunbeam ownership, Strong was eventually assigned to be the "Healthcast" reporter.

In January 1994, Strong was named host of WHDH's minority affairs program Urban Update, a role he also held until 2000.

== Public service ==
After leaving broadcasting, he was in "charge of fund-raising for Building Educated Leaders for Life, a nonprofit organization in Boston that runs a tutoring and mentoring program for elementary school students from low-income families."

As of 2014, he is Vice President and CEO of AARP Experience Corps.

He is on the Board of Trustees for Editorial Projects in Education.

== Recognition ==
- In February 1994, he was awarded the William A. Hinton Award by the Massachusetts Department of Public Health for "outstanding individuals who have significantly contributed to educating the public on health and medical issues."
- He won four Georgia Emmys for public affairs programs.
- He executive produced a documentary that won an NATPE Iris award in 1982.
- He received a Presidential commendation in 1982 for "WSB on the Job",
- In 1987, he was honored as a black achiever by the Greater Boston YMCA.
