= Don Bosco Technical High School (Boston) =

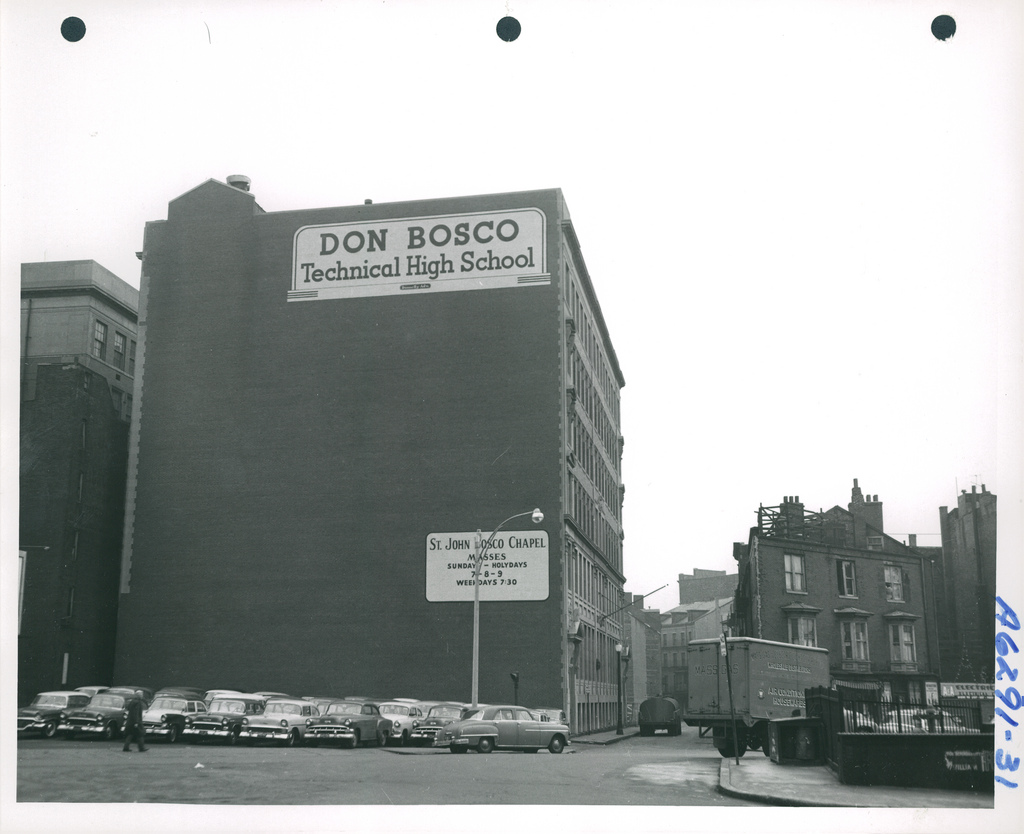

Location
- 330 Tremont St. Boston, Massachusetts; United States; 42.3493°N 71.0648°W

Information
- Type: High school
- Religious affiliations: Roman Catholic, Salesians of Don Bosco
- Patron saint: St. John Bosco
- Established: 1946
- Founder: Br. Julius Bollati, S.D.B. and Br. Angelo Bongiorno, S.D.B.
- Status: Defunct
- Closed: 1998
- School district: Archdiocese of Boston
- Employees: 64 (1980)
- Grades: 9-12
- Enrollment: 625 (1991)
- Classes offered: Cabinetmaking, Construction Technology, Drafting and Design, Electronics, Electricity and Science Technology
- Campus type: Urban
- Colors: Green and yellow
- Athletics conference: Catholic Conference (MIAA)
- Sports: Football, basketball, track, swimming, hockey, tennis
- Team name: Bears
- Yearbook: Technician

Don Bosco Technical High School (called Don Bosco Tech and Don Bosco Trade School from 1946 to 1954 and named Don Bosco School of Technology from 1993 to 1998) was an all-boys Roman Catholic secondary school for grades 9 through 12 in Boston, Massachusetts, United States. It was founded in 1946 as a school for immigrant boys by the Salesians of Don Bosco, a religious order of priests and brothers. It closed in 1998.

== History ==
=== Founding and expansion ===
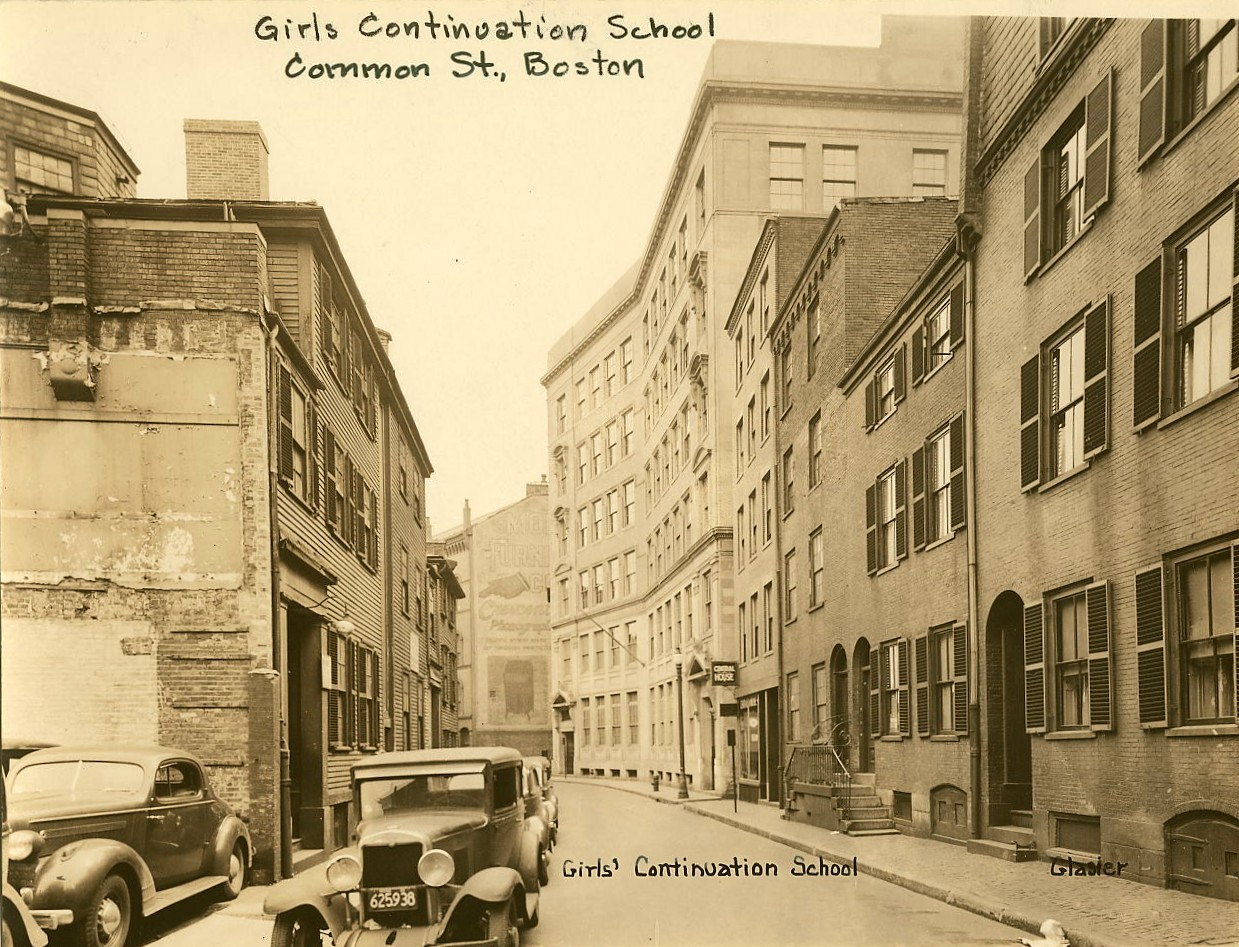
The Don Bosco Technical High School building during the early 20th Century, when it was still the City of Boston Girls' and Boys' Continuation School.

In 1945, the Salesians of Don Bosco in Boston purchased the neglected former John Paul Jones School building, built in 1898, located at 145 Byron St. in East Boston and renovated it. Don Bosco Trade School, as it was known then, opened for the 1946-1947 school year with two teachers, Br. Julius Bollati, S.D.B. and Br. Angelo Bongiorno, S.D.B. and 16 students. The new school was founded in almost a perfect location and time period: it served large numbers of the underprivileged children of mostly Roman Catholic Italian immigrants, offering both a trade and religious education. By 1954, enrollment had grown to 200, making the Byron St. campus too crowded.

The school, in partnership with the Salesian province leadership, proceeded to search for a property in Boston fulfilling the necessary requirements. The school leadership looked in a few locations, including Jamaica Plain and the South End. Initially (January 1954) a site on Rockwood St in Jamaica Plain was chosen; however, in August 1954 this plan was abandoned in favor of the former Brandeis High School on Tremont Street, South End. Don Bosco Technical High School remained at this site until its closure in 1998.

=== New campus and growth ===
The Salesians moved into the Brandeis Vocational School Campus, the main building of which was formerly the City of Boston Continuation School, with the two sides of the building split into Boys' and Girls' Units, in time for the 1954 school year. During this time there was a Salesian seminary program at Don Bosco Tech, which was terminated in later years. The original brick/limestone building was built in the 1920s. This was plenty of space to house the student body of 200 plus Salesian quarters. In the years following the student population rose rapidly, reaching 562 in 1966.

=== Decline and closure ===
By 1974 the school reached its peak enrollment at around 900 students. After that, it struggled as its facilities aged and enrollment declined. In 1971 and 1985 two new buildings were added to the campus to hold expanded electronics departments which were very popular during those years.

On March 15, 1989, 10,800 spectators attended the old Boston Garden to watch the MIAA Division I State Hockey Championship game against Catholic Memorial. They came back from 2-0 and won the game 5-2. The championship rings given to coaches and members were gold and silver with an emerald green stone. A bear, which was Don Bosco Tech's mascot, and the player's name were engraved on the sides.

By 1991, enrollment had dipped to 625. A few years later, in an attempt to rebrand and attract new students, the school was renamed Don Bosco School of Technology. In 1998, for mostly financial real estate reasons the school was forced to close.

The building was renovated and turned into a DoubleTree by Hilton hotel, while the gymnasium and pool now serves as the Wang YMCA.

== Demographics ==
Year	Enrollment	Religious Employees	Lay Employees	Total Employees
1946	16	2	0	2
1954	200	N/A	N/A	N/A
1966	562	20	11	31
1974	900	N/A	N/A	N/A
1980	737	23	41	64
1991	625	N/A	N/A	N/A

== Leadership ==
Director	Years	President	Years	Principal	Years
Fr. Angelo Bongiorno, S.D.B.	1946-56	Unknown	1946-93	Unknown	1946
Unknown	1947-56	Unknown	1946-93	Fr. Ernest Faggiono, S.D.B.	1947-49
Unknown	1947-56	Unknown	1946-93	Unknown	1949-54
Fr. Emil Francis Fardellone, S.D.B.	1956-59	Unknown	1946-93	Fr. Joseph Caselli, S.D.B.	1954-58
Unknown	1959-66	Unknown	1946-93	Unknown	1958-74
Fr. Eugene Palumbo, S.D.B.	1966-75	Unknown	1946-93	Unknown	1958-74
Fr. Eugene Palumbo, S.D.B.	1966-75	Unknown	1946-93	Br. Jerry Meegan, S.D.B.	1974-80
Unknown	1975-80	Unknown	1946-93	Br. Jerry Meegan, S.D.B.	1974-80
Fr. Kenneth Germaine, S.D.B.	1980	Unknown	1946-93	Br. Jerry Meegan, S.D.B.	1974-80
Unknown	1980-84	Unknown	1946-93	Fr. Jonathan D. Parks, S.D.B.	1980-83
Unknown	1980-84	Unknown	1946-93	Charles A. Schuetz	1983-93
Fr. Vincent Zuliani, S.D.B.	1984-89	Unknown	1946-93	Charles A. Schuetz	1983-93
Fr. Sid Figlia, S.D.B.	1989-93	Unknown	1946-93	Charles A. Schuetz	1983-93
Fr. Richard J. McCormick, S.D.B.	1993-98	Charles A. Schuetz	1993-98	Charles A. Schuetz	1983-93
Fr. Richard J. McCormick, S.D.B.	1993-98	Charles A. Schuetz	1993-98	John Goff	1994-98

Note: The years listed for many of the school officials listed above may not be complete; only those years which have verifiably been recorded as years at the school have been listed. For example, Fr. Jay Verona, S.D.B. may have served for many years before and after 1966 but sources were only able to confirm the year of 1966.

== Athletics ==
=== Championships ===
==== Basketball ====
- 1975 Catholic Conference Co- Champions
- 1975 National Champions
- 1976 Division 1 State Champions
- 1982 Division 1 North Champions (no state champions this year due Prop 2 1/2)
- 1983 Division 1 North Champions (no state champions this year due Prop 2 1/2)

==== Football ====
- 1974 Catholic Conference Champions

==== Hockey ====
- 1981 Division I State Champions
- 1989 Division I State Champions

== Notable alumni ==
- Steve DeOssie, former National Football League player
- Joe Amorosino, sports broadcaster
- John Cunniff, hockey player
- Paul Feeney, Massachusetts State Senator
- Frank Baker, member of Boston City Council
- Billy O'Dwyer, ice hockey player

== Popular culture ==
- Fallout 4, set in the area around Boston, Massachusetts, has as one of the locations 'D. B. Technical High School'
