= Diane Willis =

American television newscaster

- Born: Diane Bruhn; July 4, 1948 (age 78)
- Education: Augustana College
- Spouse: Clyde Lee
- Children: 2

Diane Willis (née Bruhn) (born July 4, 1948) is an American journalist, documentarian, teacher, and newscaster.

== Career as a broadcaster ==
Willis graduated Phi Beta Kappa from Augustana College and later earned multiple master's degrees from both the University of Chicago and the University of Missouri. She spent six years teaching English and journalism before transitioning to a career in broadcast journalism.

Her first on-air position was at KTVI in St. Louis, Missouri during 1981–82, where she worked as a reporter and anchor. In 1983, she joined Boston's WNEV-TV as a reporter and was soon promoted to main female anchor, co-anchoring the 6:00 p.m. newscast with veteran journalist Tom Ellis. Although the newscast ranked third in local ratings, it received positive critical reviews during her tenure. She stepped down in 1986.

Following her departure from WNEV, Willis taught journalism at Northeastern University for several semesters, alongside her then-husband, Jim Willis. In January 1987, she joined WRTV in Indianapolis as co-anchor of the 6:00 and 11:00 p.m. newscasts with Clyde Lee. The pair became prominent figures in Indianapolis news broadcasting and remained with the station until 2001, when they both resigned and left television news.

After leaving WRTV, Willis and Lee co-founded Lee-Willis Communications, a consulting firm specializing in public relations, crisis communications, and media training for corporate executives. In 2010, the firm drew criticism when WRTV reported that a high school had paid them $30,000 for public relations services. Willis responded to the controversy, stating that the firm could no longer provide additional support to the school.

== Personal life ==
Willis married Jim Willis in the early 1980s. In 1983, the couple adopted two sons, David and John. They later divorced. Willis later married Clyde Lee in 2000.
