= Rehema Ellis =

American journalist

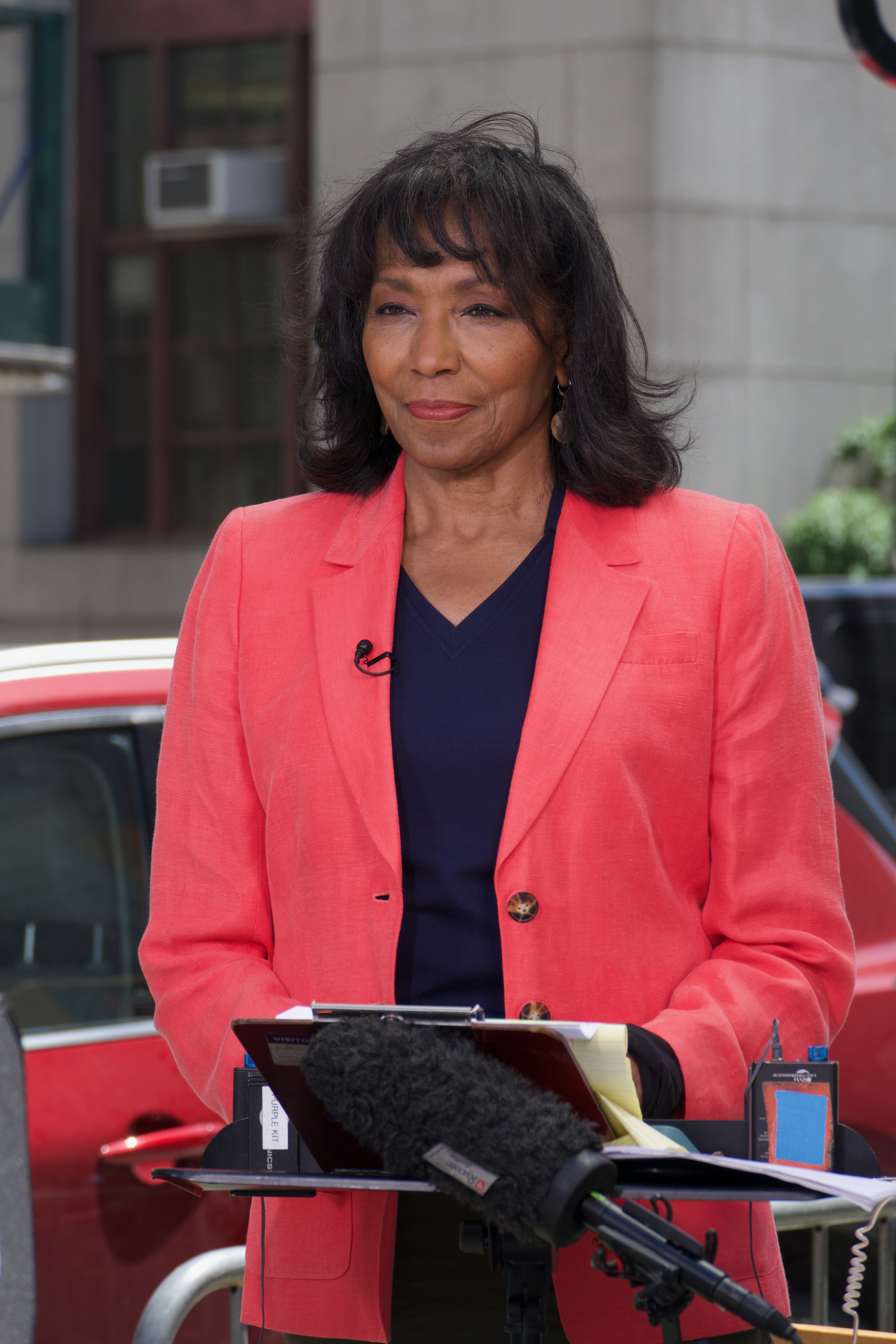
- Rehema Ellis at the Manhattan Criminal Courthouse in 2024, reporting about the prosecution of Donald Trump in New York.
- Born: April 10, 1952 (age 74); Raeford, North Carolina, United States
- Education: Simmons College and Columbia Graduate School of Journalism
- Occupation: Journalist
- Employer: NBC News
- Notable credit(s): NBC News correspondent (1994-2025); NBC News lead education correspondent (2010-2025)
- Children: Khori

Rehema Ellis is an American television journalist, who worked for NBC News from 1994 through 2025. A correspondent who was based in New York City, she was also the lead education correspondent for NBC News. On December 11, 2025, NBC News broadcast a tribute to Ellis as she was leaving her job.

== Early life and education ==
Ellis was born in 1952 in Raeford, North Carolina to Cattie Jame McLaughlin-Ellis and John Ellis. She was raised in Boston, Massachusetts.

Ellis graduated from both Simmons College, located in Boston; and the Columbia University Graduate School of Journalism, located in New York City.

== Awards and honors ==
Ellis has won numerous Emmy Awards, Associated Press awards, Edward R. Murrow Awards, and the National Association of Black Journalists awards.

== See also ==
- HistoryMakers
