= Popeye Playhouse =

American children's television series

Popeye Playhouse is a children's television show which aired weekday mornings on the American television station WTVJ in South Florida from 1957 until 1979. It was hosted by its producer and announcer, Chuck Zink, who played the character Skipper Chuck.

The show was built around life in the Playhouse, where the Skipper would tell stories, meet guests, and indulge in silly stunts with regular characters, both humans and puppets. This local children's show went on the air live in January 1957. Originally, the show was aired in an afternoon time slot from 5:00PM to 6:00PM, prior to Ralph Renick and the local news program. Popeye Playhouse had an audience of children who were primarily from Florida schools in Dade, Broward and Palm Beach counties. Skipper Chuck announced the birthdays of children, and he and his co-hosts frequently did a "Safety and Manners" program at regional elementary schools.

The show moved to a videotape format sometime after 1958. Popeye Playhouse was then recorded at 4:00PM at the WTVJ Studios in downtown Miami, and broadcast the next weekday morning at 7:00AM. His show was radically impacted by the fact that Zink was from the north. Born in Indiana, with radio and TV experience in Pennsylvania, he rejected the separation of the races on the program when he found out children were booked in groups from schools which were not integrated. Zink demanded that management allow integration on his program. That happened in the late 1950s (possibly as early as 1958), and was prior to the 1960s when race relations became a national movement.

When a child on an episode of the show in the 1970s held up the two fingers in a peace sign, Zink - who wanted to avoid any politics - was annoyed with the child and immediately came up with a new symbol with three raised fingers to represent "Peace, Love, and Happiness." The symbol led to a song that would close each episode of the show. The show was cancelled in 1979.

== Cast ==
Other characters in the show included:

=== Richard 'Scrubby' Andrews ===
Richard Andrews played the Captain's main sidekick Scrubby, a character very similar to Gilligan of Gilligan's Island. He even wore the same white sailor's cap. Scrubby would be the straight man for the Skipper's jokes, and the victim of slapstick comedy from both the Skipper and the children in the audience. One highlight of the show would be to find out which child in the audience was picked to throw a pie into Scrubby's face. Scrubby was a master of physical comedy, and was also the voices of Limbo the lion, Squeesix the mouse, Sunshine Crow, Moonshine Crow, Mr. Dragon, Blooper the dog and all the other puppets on the show. Richard moved to Key West after his retirement, where he treated visitors to Conch Train tours.

=== First Mate Ellen ===
Skipper's first co-host from January 1957 to October 1958

Ellen Kimball was a freshman at the University of Miami. She was chosen in December 1956 to take care of the children in the audience of a new children's program, "Popeye Playhouse." Skipper Chuck and First Mate Ellen wore light blue turtleneck shirts and dark pants. An artist at WTVJ made felt-backed Popeye appliques that were sewn on the shirts.

Ellen also became a spokesperson for several local and national commercial sponsors on the show. The original program format highlighted cartoons from the Popeye package, with local cut-ins for commercials. At its outset, the program was broadcast LIVE from 5 PM to 6 PM each weekday from the original Studio B at WTVJ (CBS) Channel 4. The station was located at 316 North Miami Avenue, Miami, Florida.

=== Glumbo Despair ===
Richard "Dick" McMurry worked in production at WTVJ. His sad clown character's name was one of hundreds submitted by the audience. Glumbo was a mute clown, and he only "spoke" with the use of a bicycle horn on his belt. According to his sister, Frances McMurry Robinson, who posted at another site, Richard McMurry left television, moved to North Carolina, and died in 1992.

=== Annie ===
The show's longest-running co-host. Her character was called Annie Orphanic, a play on words, with homage to ‘’Little Orphan Annie’’. She played an orphan whom the Skipper adopted and appeared on the show daily, performing in skits and singing. Annie Orphani was played by Doreen Bernhard (Ernst), the daughter of one of the series' producers, Ms. Doris Bernhard. Doreen was on the show from 1959 to 1973. Doreen married Charles Ernst, a studio cameraman at the station. After her marriage, Doreen was replaced by her sister Darla Bernhard (Olson), who was replaced by her cousin Cheryl Sweeney (Henry). Doreen's other cousin Renee L. Sweeney hosted & produced a weekly segment on the Skipper Chuck Show from 1968 to 1970. From 1959 to 1972 Irene "Miss Irene" Yelton Sweeney was the Skipper Chuck Show's producer-the first female television producer in the U.S. Irene left the Skipper Chuck show and became an independent executive producer of many award-winning television shows. Irene is now retired. Once Irene left the show, Annie's (Doreen's) mother Doris Bernhard began producing the Skipper Chuck show. She is now retired. The whole family was involved with the show, with The Mod Bods performing on a regular basis - Darla Bernhard, Chick Bernhard, Renee L. Sweeney and Cheryl Sweeney. Chick Bernhard went on to do stunts in feature films as a member of the Screen Actors Guild, and continues to do so. Renee L. Sweeney hosted and produced a children's TV show called "Getting Ready" for Wometco (the same company that owned the Skipper Chuck Show) that was distributed nationwide from 1978 to 1980, then appeared in commercials, feature films and TV shows as a member of the Screen Actors Guild. She is now an executive producer and writer for television.

=== Ed Odell ===
Now a news reporter for WTVJ, Ed Odell started out as a visitor on Popeye's Playhouse.

=== Tommy Gannon ===
Musical Director who was introduced at the beginning of the show during the later years.

=== Uncle Don ===
Skipper Chuck's first musical sidekick who played the Hammond Organ and wore loud Hawaiian shirts. He also served as a straight comic foil for Skipper Chuck's often droll jokes. Don Sebastian Pesce was a local musician who played at local supper clubs in South Florida for years. Don was responsible, with Chuck and Annie, for many of the original songs written for the show.

== Cartoons ==
The show was originally created to allow for introductions to the Popeye cartoons. This type of show was typical in other markets, and each TV market originated its own children's television shows.

== Special guests ==
Among the special guests who made periodic appearances were Miami Dolphins football coach Don Shula and Jackie Gleason. Every star in town was invited on the show.....Sylvester Stallone, Muhammad Ali, Art Linkletter, several astronauts, Barbara Feldon, Carlos Montoya, Van Cliburn, and many more over the years.

== Regular features ==
Regular features included the "Word of the Day" that was later utilized in Pee-Wee's Playhouse and the selection of one lucky child to throw a pie into Scrubby's face. Another regular feature was the "balloon drop," where balloons would drop from the ceiling and the children would shake them until the one with vitamins was found. In later shows, children would pop them until one found a piece of paper indicating he was the winner of a cache of board games.

Skipper Chuck gave a three-fingered "Peace, Love, and Happiness" salute.

== Schedule history ==
The show had a 22-year run, making it one of the longest-running local South Florida original program series.
