= Chuck Zink =

Actor and television personality

- Born: February 4, 1925; South Bend, Indiana, US
- Died: January 5, 2006 (aged 80); Boca Raton, Florida, US
- Occupation: Television announcer
- Known for: Skipper Chuck; Jackie Gleason Show announcer
- Spouse: Clarice Zink
- Awards: Bronze Star

Charles DeWayne Zink (February 4, 1925 – January 5, 2006) was an American television personality and film actor, best known for playing the character Skipper Chuck who hosted the popular South Florida children's television series Popeye Playhouse (1957–1979).

== Biography ==
Charles Zink was born in South Bend, Indiana, on February 4, 1925. He enlisted in the United States Marine Corps, and served during World War II, receiving a Bronze Star.

After being discharged from the Marine Corps, Zink began a career in broadcasting in Pennsylvania. He moved to Miami and joined WTVJ in 1956. Zink played the children's show host Skipper Chuck from 1957 to 1979. In 1980, he hosted a short-run TV gameshow for elementary school children in a format similar to Jeopardy.

He also appeared in the B-movie Mission Mars in 1968 which was created in Miami.

Zink worked with Jerry Lewis as the local representative for many of the Muscular Dystrophy Association Labor Day Telethons, not only as the local host for 24 years of the marathon through 2005, but by including children with muscular dystrophy on his children's show.

Additionally, he was proactive at encouraging his young viewers to hold "Carnivals for Dystrophy" at their homes to raise money for the Muscular Dystrophy Association. The kids' show even provided a "Carnivals for Dystrophy" kit to anyone that requested it, to help make their carnival a success. The kit actually included a coupon that could be taken to the local Burger King restaurant to receive orange drink syrup and cups, to be used to sell orange drink at their carnival. To boost kids' participation in the program, Zink and his fellow cast members would make live appearances at Burger King restaurants with a live show to promote "Carnivals for Dystrophy". His efforts got kids excited to help in the fundraising.

He also was the television host of the local Orange Bowl New Year's Parade for 22 years, and the announcer for the Jackie Gleason Show for 12 years.

Zink lived in South Florida for 50 years, and was a popular local personality that used his recognizable voice in national events such as the Miss USA and Miss Universe pageants. He also hosted a local radio program known as The Lunch Bunch on WJNA, winning a Big Mike award for Radio Personality of the Year. He also hosted The Senior Side for radio listeners of WXEL in Palm Beach County. He also was the sales voice and poster face of Century Village, an active retirement community in South Florida.

He was able to use his position with children to change views on race relations, the peace movement, and later in his career, treatment of the elderly. His show included the first integrated children's audience in South Florida, and his trademark hand symbol, with three fingers up, represented "Peace, Love, and Happiness", as a way to improve upon the peace symbol the children were seeing on the news. His "Word of the Day" helped young immigrants to learn the English language, including many Cubans that moved into Miami during the years of his show.

Zink died in January 2006 in Boca Raton, Florida, under care of Hospice by the Sea at the age of 80 of complications from a massive stroke suffered on December 19, 2005.

== Awards ==
For his work on television and for children, Zink received many awards, including:

- Two Emmy Awards
- One Big Mike Award
