= Ralph Renick =

American journalist (1928–1991)

- Born: Ralph Apperson Renick; August 9, 1928; New York City, New York
- Died: July 11, 1991 (aged 62); Miami, Florida
- Education: University of Miami
- Occupations: Television news journalist, commentator
- Relatives: Dick Renick (brother)

Ralph Apperson Renick (August 9, 1928 – July 11, 1991) was a pioneer American television journalist for Miami's WTVJ, channel 4 (now channel 6), Florida's first television station. He was WTVJ's first and longest running news anchor and the driving force behind television news in South Florida from the station's inception in March 1949 until his departure nearly 36 years later in 1985.

== Education ==
Renick attended and graduated from the University of Miami, where he studied under an H. V. Kaltenborn scholarship. Kaltenborn was an eminent CBS Radio commentator. While at the University of Miami, Renick interned with WTVJ, then channel 4, and would build a 36-year career at the station.

== Career ==
Renick was unopposed as a South Florida anchor from 1949 when WTVJ aired programs from all networks via kinescopes, until it became exclusively a CBS affiliate in 1956. In that year, WCKT (now WSVN), channel 7 began broadcasting in Miami as an NBC affiliate station, followed in the late 1950s by WPST-TV (now WPLG-TV), channel 10, as ABC's outlet in Miami (WTVJ was purchased by NBC in 1987, but would not become an NBC station until 1989, when WSVN, the former NBC station, became a Fox affiliate, and WCIX assumed the CBS affiliation from WTVJ). Despite a strong attempt to challenge Renick and WTVJ over the years, he remained the dominant and number one rated news anchor for his entire 36-year run.

In 1957, Renick broadcast the first of nearly 30 years of nightly editorials on his 6 pm newscast, The Ralph Renick Report. Two years later, in 1959, he traveled to Cuba for an exclusive interview with its new socialist revolutionary prime minister Fidel Castro, and later that same year to the Kremlin, to interview Soviet Premier Nikita Khrushchev. In 1960, Renick named Dr. Manolo Reyes, a former lawyer in Cuba, and a pioneering Spanish-language broadcaster, to launch South Florida's first Spanish-language newscast on WTVJ.

In 1967, he hired Jane Chastain, the nation's first female sportscaster. A year later, in 1968, Renick made history again by hiring South Florida's first black reporter, C.T. Taylor.

Renick pushed WTVJ to pioneer video tape and ENG (Electronic News Gathering) in late 1974 and by November 1975 had the state's first truly mobile live truck up and running. Shortly after 3:00 pm on November 30, 1975, Renick broke into regular programming to report an attempted assassination on Ronald Reagan, in town for a speech at the Miami Airport Ramada Inn. Because WTVJ's live capability was in place, Renick was able to throw to reporter Bob Mayer for the station's first live mobile field report (See link below).

Renick, then a widower with six children, served on the board of directors of the Associated Press from October 1977 to May 1981. He also served as president of the Associated Press Broadcasters, an advisory group for the AP's news division. Additionally, Renick was also president of the Radio-Television News Directors Association.

Though Renick and WTVJ would continue to dominate news ratings throughout the mid-1980s, his unique position at the station began to change when the founder and longtime owner of WTVJ, Wometco Enterprises, Inc., sold off the Wometco empire following the death of founder and President Mitchell Wolfson in 1983. The station was acquired by Kohlberg Kravis Roberts (KKR), an investment firm, for $1 billion, then the largest leveraged buyout in U.S. history.

== Retirement ==
During the majority of his tenure at WTVJ, Renick reported directly to Mitchell Wolfson. He was, in fact, believed to be the only news director in local American television news to report directly to a station owner rather than a station's general manager. As a result, Renick had unprecedented authority before Wolfson's death.

After the acquisition, KKR began to structure WTVJ's newsroom differently in the more traditional way of the 1980s with multiple persons in management, and slowly stripped Renick of that authority, making it uncomfortable for him to continue within his unique role as the station's top anchor, editorialist, news director, and vice president for news. As a result, Renick made the preemptive decision to resign on his terms rather than be forced out by KKR.

On April 10, 1985, Renick appeared for the last time on WTVJ, telling his audience "It is my decision, effective tonight, to step down as vice president and news director of WTVJ, and also relinquish my duties as newscaster/editorialist on this program." At the time, he did not announce what his plans were. He simply told viewers "I thank you for being the most supportive TV news audience anyone could ever hope to have." He ended his run on the station with his traditional sign-off, "Good night and may the good news be yours," but then added these three words: "... and hopefully mine."

Within six weeks, Renick announced he would be a candidate in the 1986 race for Governor as a Democrat. He spent $100,000 of his own money on his failed gubernatorial bid before quitting the race after six months.

In 1988, Renick returned to the air once again, after signing a multi-year contract with WCIX (now WFOR) to do a nightly commentary called "The Ralph Renick Report." As his health began to fail, Renick officially retired in September 1990.

== Death and legacy ==
After spending the last months of his life hospitalized, Renick died on July 11, 1991, at Cedars Medical Center in Miami of complications from hepatitis and liver disease. He was a month away from his 63rd birthday. His funeral mass at St. Mary's Cathedral was presided over by then Archbishop Edward McCarthy and was packed to standing room only. It was broadcast live in a 2-hour special report on WTVJ.

News of Ralph Renick's death was the lead story on every Miami station, and was the end of an era in television news.

When WTVJ's analog nightlight service ended on June 26, 2009, long-time anchor Bob Mayer said farewell, and ended the analog transmission by running archive footage of Renick uttering his sign-off catchphrase, freeze-framing as he smiles, accompanied by a short, bombastic orchestral piece.

== Accolades ==
- 1984: Paul White Award, Radio Television Digital News Association

Preceded by originator	WTVJ anchor (as The Ralph Renick Report / News 4 With Ralph Renick) with interim anchors Jim Brosemer and Ana Azcuy from March until August 1985; 1949 – 1985	Succeeded by John Hambrick and Susan Lichtman Taylor
