= WTVJ =

Television station in Miami

ATSC 3.0 station
- Miami–Fort Lauderdale, Florida; United States
- City: Miami, Florida
- Channels: Digital: 31 (UHF); Virtual: 6
- Branding: NBC 6

Programming
- Affiliations: 6.1: NBC; for others, see § Subchannels

Ownership
- Owner: NBC Owned Television Stations; (NBC Telemundo License LLC)
- Sister stations: WSCV

History
- First air date: March 21, 1949
- Former channel number: Analog: 4 (VHF, 1949–1995), 6 (VHF, 1995–2009)
- Former affiliations: CBS (1949–1989); DuMont (secondary, 1949–1956); NBC (secondary, 1949–1956); ABC (secondary, 1949–1957)

Technical information
- Licensing authority: FCC
- Facility ID: 63154
- ERP: 1,000 kW
- HAAT: 311 m (1,020 ft)
- Transmitter coordinates: 25°58′8″N 80°13′19″W

Links
- Public license information: Public file; LMS
- Website: www.nbcmiami.com

WTVJ (channel 6) is a television station in Miami, Florida, United States. It is owned and operated by the NBC television network through its NBC Owned Television Stations division alongside Fort Lauderdale–licensed WSCV (channel 51), a flagship station of Telemundo. The two stations share studios on Southwest 27th Street in Miramar; WTVJ's transmitter is located in Andover, Florida.

WTVJ began broadcasting March 21, 1949, on channel 4 as Florida's first television station. Owned by Wometco Enterprises, a Miami movie theater operator, the station nearly did not launch due to a disputed transfer of the construction permit. A primary affiliate of CBS, WTVJ was Miami's only television station for four years, establishing a head-start in local programming. Anchorman Ralph Renick had Miami's highest-rated television newscast for 34 years, Chuck Zink's children's show Skipper Chuck ran for more than 20 years, and the station featured sports coverage and local Spanish-language programming. WTVJ produced a series of notable reporters and anchors, including Jane Chastain, Katie Couric, Bernard Goldberg, and Martha Teichner. This era of stability and ratings success began to decay considerably after Wometco's owner, Mitchell Wolfson, died in 1983. The firm's television stations were sold to investment company Kohlberg Kravis Roberts (KKR), which instituted cost cuts and management changes that prompted Renick to exit in 1985, months after his evening newscast fell to second place for the first time. After Renick's departure, WTVJ fell to third place in news ratings.

KKR acquired Storer Communications soon after purchasing WTVJ, creating a cross-ownership conflict between Storer's cable systems in South Florida and WTVJ. Lorimar-Telepictures initially agreed to purchase the station but backed out once it emerged that CBS was looking at buying another Miami station, WCIX (channel 6), at a discount. The effect was to scare off buyers that were not themselves television networks. NBC agreed to buy WTVJ in 1987, displacing its longtime Miami affiliate, WSVN (channel 7). WSVN's affiliation agreement with NBC expired at the end of 1988, until which NBC continued to run WTVJ as a CBS affiliate. The purchase catalyzed a six-station, two-market affiliation switch on January 1, 1989, when WTVJ became an NBC affiliate; CBS moved to WCIX; and WSVN became an independent station affiliated with Fox. The switch came amidst a multi-million-dollar publicity campaign that critics considered grating and off-putting. Though NBC made a significant investment in the news department and its coverage of Hurricane Andrew won industry acclaim, WTVJ's local newscasts remained mired in third place. The newsroom was beset by problems: turnover of news anchors, an unsuccessful attempt to clone WSVN's news presentation style, and low ratings for NBC's daytime programming.

Another round of television affiliation realignment, this time affecting markets nationwide, led to a September 10, 1995, channel switch with WCIX as part of an asset trade between NBC and CBS. On that date, WTVJ and its NBC and local programming moved to channel 6, while WCIX and its CBS and local programming moved to channel 4 as WFOR-TV. The switch was an upgrade for CBS and a downgrade for NBC, as the analog channel 6 facility in Miami faced location restrictions that reduced its population coverage. Despite this, WTVJ found a news identity under general manager Don Browne, who led the station to its best newscast ratings performance since the Renick years in the late 1990s and early 2000s. Browne oversaw WTVJ's move from downtown Miami to its Miramar studios in 2000 and the integration of WSCV with WTVJ after NBC bought Telemundo in 2001. The station has run generally first or second among English-language local newscasts since the early 2000s, complimenting overall market leader WSCV.

== The Wometco years ==
=== Permitting, construction, and hearings ===
The Southern Radio and Television Equipment Company applied to the Federal Communications Commission (FCC) on January 6, 1947, for permission to build a television station in Miami on channel 4. The permit was granted on March 12, 1947, and president Robert G. Venn announced that Miami would have television by August. In addition to Venn, principals in Southern Radio and Television Equipment included Edward N. Claughton, a banker and title insurance company owner, and attorney E. J. Nelson.

... I saw [in World War II] that modern civilization depended on communication. The German army was really defeated when we destroyed their communications, and I made up my mind when I got back to the States and got back to private industry ... that I would engage our company in some form of communication. Having been in the motion picture industry where we were well acquainted with both sight and sound, it seemed to me that television had the greatest opportunity in which we could serve and profit from communications.

— Mitchell Wolfson, founder of WTVJ

In March 1948, Southern Radio and Television Equipment filed to transfer the construction permit for WTVJ to Wolfson-Meyer Theatre Enterprises, Inc., better known as Wometco Enterprises. From the beginning, Wometco was headed by co-founder Mitchell Wolfson. On July 29, the FCC moved to revoke WTVJ's construction permit, having learned that Claughton had backed out. The commission's action came as WTVJ was nearly ready to begin broadcasting, just weeks before an announced August 15 date to start testing and after a contract had been leased to turn a Wometco theater on Third Street into studios for WTVJ and a transmitter had been shipped. The commission believed that the transfer of interests from Claughton to Wometco was a misrepresentation and concealment. Construction activity halted after the revocation order was issued. It was the first time the FCC had revoked a television station permit.

A hearing was requested in mid-August, which legally required the revocation order to be stayed. A request to go on the air in the interim was denied, and on October 25, the FCC opened three days of hearings in Miami. At the hearings, Venn explained that Claughton had withdrawn his participation in the firm in March 1947, the same month it won the permit. He made this decision after stocks he owned lost value. As a result, Venn held $193,500 in checks Claughton had put up to obtain a 32-percent stake in Southern Radio and Television Equipment. When Wometco agreed to buy Southern Radio, it advanced funds for station construction, and Wometco had become associated with Venn through its plan to build a new Miami radio station, WMIE (1140 AM). FCC vice chairman Paul A. Walker, who had led the hearings, issued an initial decision in January 1949 that recommended rescinding the revocation and approving WTVJ's sale to Wometco. Though he said that "neither Wometco nor Venn acted prudently in this matter", he found Wometco qualified to run the station and did not find that there was any deliberate concealment. The FCC approved on January 27, 1949, and granted authority to put interim station facilities on the air.

=== Early years of operation ===
From an antenna atop the Everglades Hotel, WTVJ sent out its first test pattern on February 21, 1949, and on March 21, WTVJ began airing regular programs. It was the first television station in Florida and the 58th in the United States. Its original schedule called for at least two hours of programming, six nights a week; the station was off the air on Tuesdays for the part-time engineers to repair equipment.

National programming from all four networks—ABC, CBS, NBC, and the DuMont Television Network—exclusively came on film and kinescopes flown from New York, as Miami was not connected to the coaxial cable system used to transmit network television until June 30, 1952. The station aired an array of local programs to complement network shows. Students at the University of Miami trained on WTVJ's equipment and produced a weekly Saturday night show. On the quiz show Quick on the Draw, Air Force recruiting personnel faced off against models. Other local shows included the cooking series Holiday House and the consumer program Shopper's Guide, as well as cartoons and country music. Sports telecasts included Miami Hurricanes football in the 1949 and 1950 seasons—before the university revoked permission, fearing telecasts would hurt attendance—as well as the Orange Bowl, roller derby, horse racing, golf, and jai alai. Old movies also featured; Alec Gibson, faced with a meager inventory of films available to television, hosted what he called "The P.U. Club". In December 1950, the station was on the air for 12 hours each day, with just under half of its output consisting of network shows.

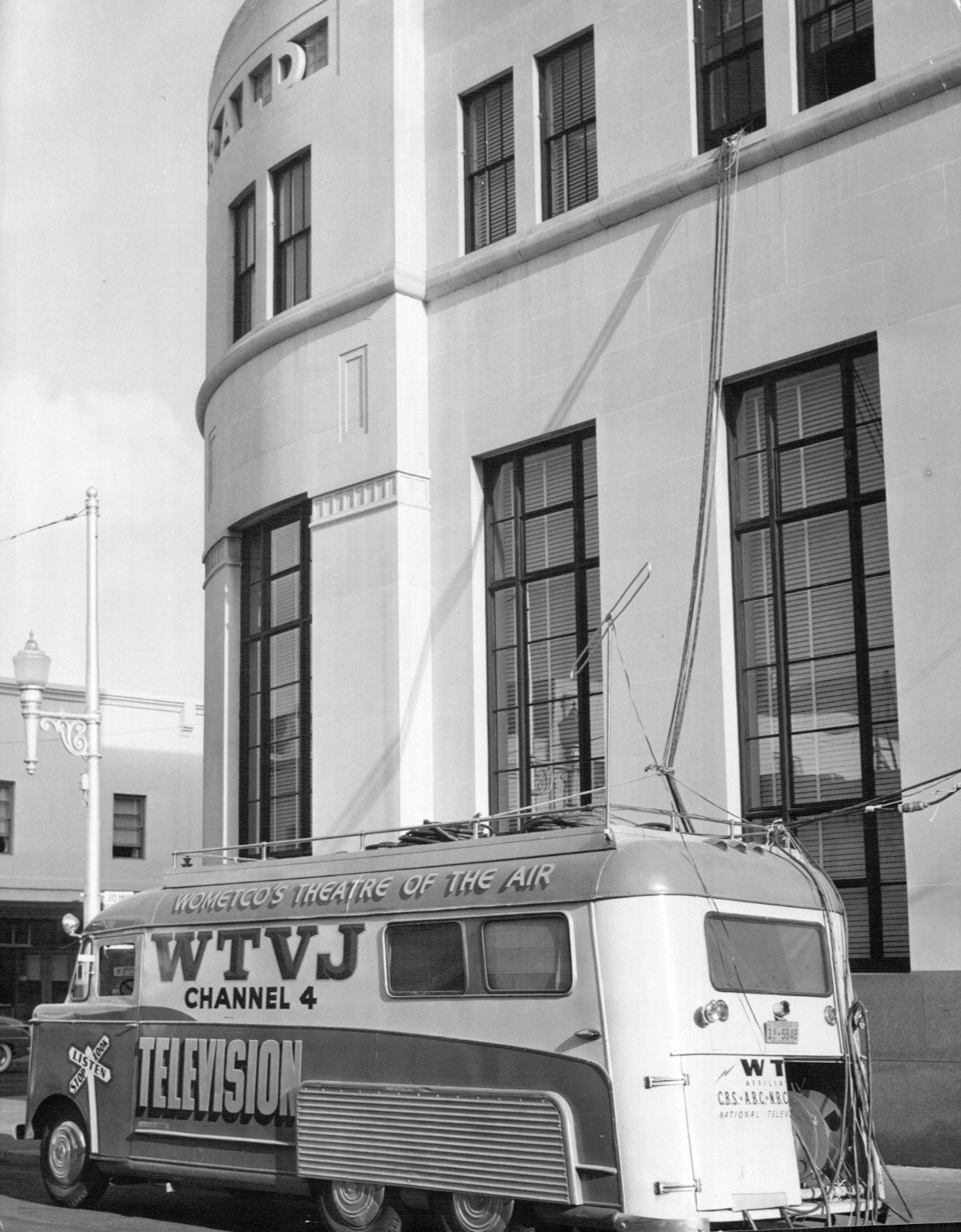
WTVJ's remote broadcast van at the offices of the Miami Herald in 1950

WTVJ's first news effort consisted of a collaboration with the Miami Herald and the Herald radio station WQAM, Televiews of the News, which debuted as a weekly program on December 11, 1949. The Herald's photographers and WQAM announcers produced and presented the program. The liaison between WTVJ and The Herald was Ralph Renick, a recent graduate of the University of Miami. On July 16, 1950, amid the backdrop of the Korean War, WTVJ started producing its own local newscasts, with Renick as the anchor. With limited resources and day-old film, Renick slowly began to build up the operation as well as a library of magazine clippings to illustrate news stories.

Another charter WTVJ employee was weatherman Bob Weaver. He worked at the station for 20 years before leaving for a three-year stint at two stations in the Northeast, WCBS-TV in New York and WHDH-TV in Boston, returning to Miami and WTVJ in 1972. One of the first forecasters to be certified by the American Meteorological Society, Weaver was also a ventriloquist, often delivering light jokes alongside weather reports with puppet sidekick "Weavie the Weatherbird".

In November 1952, WTVJ opened a three-story studio facility, connected to the existing facility, in what had been the Capitol Theatre. The conversion of the Capitol for television use included a 68-by-100-foot (21 by 30 m) main stage and was designed to allow the station to originate national television programs for wintering hosts.

=== After the freeze ===
By surviving its revocation hearing and getting on the air, WTVJ assured itself of being South Florida's only TV station for several years. In October 1948, the FCC started a years-long freeze on new television station permits, with WTVJ being the only one it had awarded in Miami. Had WTVJ not gone on air, South Florida would have gone without television for years like Denver or Portland, neither of which had pre-freeze stations in operation. In a 1974 retrospective on early Miami TV, Jack E. Anderson of the Miami Herald noted that the head-start WTVJ had received on its competition "in many ways has persisted to this day".

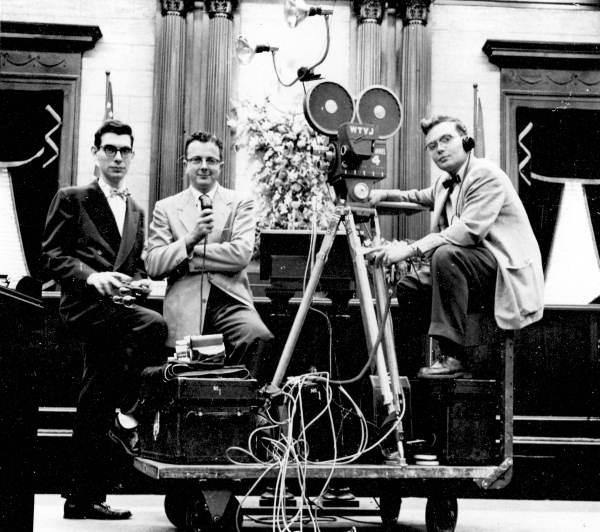
A WTVJ news crew in the 1950s

The freeze was lifted in 1952. Television competition came to South Florida first on two stations in the ultra high frequency (UHF) band, originally licensed to Fort Lauderdale. WFTL-TV (channel 23), the first post-freeze TV outlet in the state, started on May 5, 1953, as an outlet for previously unseen NBC programs; some NBC output remained on WTVJ. The other Fort Lauderdale station, WITV on channel 17, started on December 1, 1953; it had a similar secondary arrangement with ABC and DuMont, though WTVJ retained first call rights to their programs. These stations started while Miami's two additional commercial VHF channels, 7 and 10, were tied up in comparative hearing processes with multiple applicants seeking them. (Note: Channel 6 was not formally inserted at Miami until 1959.)

Over the course of 1954, channel 4 upgraded its facilities. On May 17, 1954, it ceased broadcasting from the Everglades antenna and moved to a new facility in Hallandale on the Dade–Broward county line. With the move came an upgrade to the maximum effective radiated power permitted on channel 4, 100,000 watts. The land was sold to Wolfson by Sidney Ansin, who co-founded Sunbeam Television with sons Ron and Edmund to pursue a license for channel 7. During construction of the new tower, a steeplejack fell 400 feet (120 m) to his death. In September, the station aired the first color television broadcast in the area, the NBC special Satins and Spurs. WTVJ discarded its NBC shows that November to become an exclusive affiliate of CBS, leaving NBC's programs to air on WFTL-TV and WJNO-TV in West Palm Beach.

The early UHF stations were supplanted by VHF outlets: WCKT-TV started in July 1956 on channel 7, and WPST-TV debuted in August 1957 on channel 10. (Note: WPST-TV ceased operations on November 19, 1961, after its broadcast license was revoked by the FCC; WLBW-TV signed on over channel 10 the next day as an unrelated station, hiring some former WPST personnel. WCKT's license was also revoked the following year, but all assets and programming were sold to Sunbeam Television and all staff were retained.) With more intense ratings competition from the new stations and increased network offerings from CBS, the "friendly, disjointed" local programming on WTVJ waned. Renick instituted the nation's first regular TV editorials in 1957, focusing on local and state issues; ratings for the already popular Ralph Renick Reporting doubled. The WTVJ news department, led by Renick, gained local and international stature. In 1956, Renick mediated racial tensions in Delray Beach at the request of the mayor, who credited him as the sole reason the situation was resolved. The next year, he embarked on a 10-day, 17,500-mile (28,200 km) tour through Europe and North Africa, filming footage and conducting interviews.

In 1956, Chuck Zink joined the station from WCMB-TV in Harrisburg, Pennsylvania. The station had purchased a package of Popeye cartoons, which Zink began to host as Popeye Playhouse. Later retitled The Skipper Chuck Show, the program enjoyed substantial popularity for years. A waiting list to be in its studio audience was two years long at its height. Zink was the first local children's show host to racially integrate his program, with Wolfson's support; the sponsor, the hamburger restaurant Royal Castle, pulled out and was replaced with the little-known Burger King chain. In addition to Skipper Chuck, Zink was a movie host and pageant announcer for WTVJ.

=== Dominating Miami news ratings ===
WTVJ responded in the 1960s to changing demographics and needs in Miami. In 1960, Manolo Reyes approached Wolfson and Renick with a suggestion to start a regular Spanish-language newscast. The concept was greenlit, and the station debuted News en Español on weekday mornings on August 28, 1960. While it met with strong negative reaction from some viewers, Wolfson defended Reyes, who was later named Latin news editor. The newscast provided information for the Cuban exiles fleeing the country after the 1959 Cuban Revolution. The daily Spanish-language newscasts continued until 1971, when Reyes shifted to hosting a new weekly news review in Spanish, The Manolo Reyes Report; Reyes remained with WTVJ until 1979. Jane Chastain joined WTVJ in 1967 as one of the nation's first female sportscasters and received more substantial assignments than at prior jobs in Raleigh, North Carolina, and Atlanta; she remained with the station before leaving for a network job in 1976. After riots erupted in Miami's Black-majority Liberty City neighborhood, Renick hired WTVJ's first Black reporter, C. T. Taylor, in 1968. For much of this time, Ruth Sperling was considered Renick's "right arm", overseeing the newsroom and being responsible for spotting and hiring young talent that went on to local and national prominence. Starting in 1953 as a secretary, she was assistant news director when she exited WTVJ in 1983.

The Ralph Renick Report was lengthened from 15 to 30 minutes in 1965. By that year, the station had 30 employees in news and bureaus in Fort Lauderdale and Tallahassee. That year, the station's News Weekend newscasts debuted a new staff member: interviewer Larry King, who also hosted a late-night talk show known as Nightcap. King remained on air at WTVJ until December 1971, after he was charged with grand larceny; the charges were dropped, but the station dismissed him in March 1972. WTVJ won the Alfred I. duPont–Columbia University Award for 1972 for two station-produced documentaries—A Seed of Hope, on drug addiction, and The Swift Justice of Europe, a comparative look at criminal justice in Europe and Florida. As WTVJ matured, it became Wometco's principal cash cow, per Louis Wolfson III, Mitchell Wolfson's grandson.

Skipper Chuck continued through most of the 1970s, though as CBS began to make a stronger push into mornings, WTVJ's choice to air the children's show and not the CBS Morning News became a source of tension with the network. CBS chairman William S. Paley, who wintered on Cat Cay in the Bahamas, was known to be displeased that he could not see his own network's morning show. At Paley's insistence, WTVJ aired the Morning News for one week, coinciding with the 1968 Republican National Convention held in Miami Beach. Later, Paley persuaded WCIX-TV (channel 6), Miami's independent station, to air the program. Viewership for Skipper Chuck declined over the latter half of the decade, the show stopped making a profit, and parents became more critical of children's television programming. In 1978, the studio audience was changed to one a week. In January 1979, Skipper Chuck changed to a weekly show on Saturday mornings, bringing the CBS Morning News to WTVJ.

Too often stations with consultants end up trying to present news only as the research results suggest the people want. But lost in this concept is that a professional journalist should have the ability and news judgment to determine what is important and significant.

— Ralph Renick, on news consultants in a 1973 survey

In spite of WTVJ's news ratings success, Renick shunned the consultant-driven, softer news formats that became popular in the 1970s and early 1980s. He called Frank Magid & Associates a "Trojan horse" that permitted non-news management to control the news department. He rejected recommendations it had made to WTVJ, including instituting a co-anchor format for the early and late newscasts, replacing the weatherman, de-emphasizing Broward County news, and airing more, shorter stories. On one occasion, he refused to attend a meeting with a news consultant that management hired because he had passed over one of its employees for a job at WTVJ, and he refused to take advice from someone he had rejected hiring himself. In a 1977 interview with Larry King for The Miami News, he denounced consultant-driven newscasters who favored aesthetics over journalism.

=== Death of Mitchell Wolfson and resignation of Renick ===
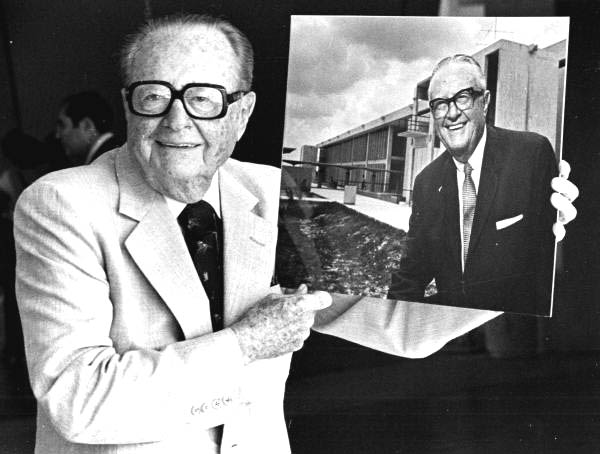
Mitchell Wolfson, c. 1980

Wolfson died of a heart attack on January 28, 1983, which came after two heart attacks the previous February that had fueled concern among financial circles about Wometco's financial health. Contrary to Wolfson's prior insistence of a plan so Wometco could never be taken over or sold off, no such succession plan was found or mentioned in his will. No one was designated as a succeeding chairman and Wolfson was the largest stockholder in Wometco at the time of his death. Some believed Wolfson intended to have his family decide the company's future, while others felt his "secret plan" was simply never to leave.

After approving several measures in a shareholders meeting designed to prevent a hostile takeover, the Wolfson family and Wometco board sold the company to a merchant banker, Kohlberg Kravis Roberts & Co. (KKR), on September 21, 1983, in a $1 billion leveraged buyout. At the time, it was the largest corporate transaction in Florida history and a record for a leveraged buyout. While Wometco still existed after the buyout was completed on April 13, 1984, the company was taken private and split into two entities: one based around the television station licenses and Wometco Home Theater and the other centered around the theater chain, Miami Seaquarium, bottling, and cable television divisions.

Wolfson's death marked the end of an era for WTVJ and especially Renick, who eulogized him as "more than just an employer—he was the father I didn't have, the guiding light of my professional life as well as my personal one". In November 1984, for the first time since Renick became news anchor in July 1950, WTVJ failed to have the number-one evening newscast in total viewers; it had been surpassed by WPLG-TV's Eyewitness News, which years earlier had overtaken channel 4 among younger demographics. This prompted the station to begin searching for a new 11 p.m. news anchor, with the goal of bringing in younger viewers and the expectation that they would someday replace Renick at 6 p.m. That search ended at the start of April 1985 with the hiring of John Hambrick from WNBC-TV in New York City. Soon after came an announcement that Renick was pondering his own future. On April 10, 1985, Renick announced his immediate resignation from WTVJ on air, ending a nearly 35-year run and sparking speculation about a run for governor.

During this time, Katie Couric joined WTVJ as a general-assignment reporter in 1984 after a temporary job at CNN failed to translate into a full-time opportunity. Couric saw Miami as a good news market and WTVJ as a station with a good reputation. In one instance, Couric slept on the streets for a night for a story about homelessness. However, news director Al Buck refused to use her as an anchor, even in an emergency, feeling she was not good enough. Couric departed WTVJ for NBC-owned WRC-TV in Washington, D.C., in 1986; she later went on to anchor Today and the CBS Evening News.

== Attempted sale to Lorimar ==
In late April 1985, KKR acquired Storer Communications in another leveraged buyout engineered to thwart a liquidation of that company by dissatisfied shareholders and to prevent a hostile takeover by Comcast. Completed in December 1985, approval by the FCC was contingent on KKR divesting either Storer's cable systems in Miami and Wometco's cable systems in Atlanta, or WTVJ and Storer's WAGA-TV, within 18 months to satisfy cross-ownership rules. While Storer and Wometco remained nominally separate companies, the FCC recognized KKR as the primary owner of both. By April 25, 1986, KKR opted to retain the Storer cable system and put WTVJ on the market with a deadline of May 1, 1987. Wometco's cable systems were also divested.

I wonder if I have to wear cowboy boots to work now... I was totally surprised. I never heard the name Lorimar mentioned around the station. I heard network, and I heard other big broadcasting companies named, but not Lorimar.

— Alan Mendelson, WTVJ reporter, on news of the station's proposed sale to Lorimar-Telepictures (producers of the CBS soap opera Dallas)

One anonymous Wometco staffer told the Miami Herald that several broadcast networks showed an interest in WTVJ, with a CBS official identifying Miami as one of eight "Sun Belt" markets for future acquisitions. A revision to the Herald story added that NBC also made an inquiry about the station. KKR had originally intended to sell off WTVJ by itself and had rejected a $350 million offer by CBS in the process, but it soon fielded inquiries about including some of the Storer stations in a potential sale.

Television and film production and syndication company Lorimar-Telepictures emerged as the buyer of WTVJ—along with Storer stations WAGA-TV, WITI, WJBK, WJW-TV, WSBK-TV and KCST—in a $1.85 billion group deal announced on May 21, 1986. WTVJ, including the studio building and surrounding land, was itself sold for $405 million. Also included were Storer's program production company, advertising sales division, and Washington news bureau. A KKR representative said the firm stood "to make a bundle" and that Lorimar-Telepictures, unlike KKR, had the resources to do more with the stations. Lorimar-Telepictures already owned five television stations inherited from predecessor Telepictures and concurrently with the Storer transaction had made offers to purchase WPGH-TV in Pittsburgh and WTTV in Bloomington, Indiana, serving Indianapolis. The deal faced opposition from the Cleveland chapter of NABET and a group of minority Wometco shareholders, but Lorimar-Telepictures president Alan Bell expressed confidence those disputes would be resolved.

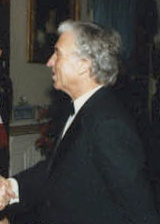
Merv Adelson

In the June 7, 1986, edition of The Palm Beach Post, TV critic Bob Michals reported on rumors of a possible affiliation swap between WPEC (channel 12), West Palm Beach's ABC affiliate, and WTVX (channel 34), a UHF station and CBS affiliate based in Fort Pierce. WTVX had gone on the air in 1966 and initially primarily covered the Treasure Coast area. WTVJ continued to be the CBS affiliate of record for the Palm Beaches for more than a decade after channel 34 signed on; channel 4 could be seen clearly on cable systems in Palm Beach County despite its weak signal. When WTVJ opened a news bureau in Palm Beach County in 1970, that area represented 12.4 percent of its audience. At one time, it outrated WPEC before the station improved and lost the distinction of being, per Alan Jenkins of The Palm Beach Post, an "embarrassing No. 3 in a two-station market". In 1980, WTVX built a new transmitting facility further south. Its signal covered Palm Beach County for the first time, and the county's cable systems added WTVX to their lineups. WTVX general manager Lynwood Wright asserted no one from either network had been in contact with him, while Michals expressed puzzlement over CBS wanting to risk hurting WTVJ's ratings by having WPEC join the network, saying, "[T]he only question I have with the swap is why?"

On October 22, 1986, Lorimar-Telepictures asked to exclude WTVJ from the deal, which KKR agreed to. This was initially attributed to Lorimar having issues financing the deal, a weak advertising climate in Miami, and reduced cash flow estimates for WTVJ that would have made it impossible to cover interest serviced on $2 billion in high-yield bonds raised by Lorimar founder Merv Adelson. The $405 million price was nearly 21 times WTVJ's cash flow while typical station purchase prices were 10 to 14 times cash flow, causing financial markets to believe Lorimar grossly overpaid.

A few days later, the Miami Herald reported that Lorimar backed away from WTVJ after learning CBS inquired with Taft Broadcasting about purchasing WCIX for as much as $125 million, which risked forcing WTVJ to become an independent with a drastically reduced valuation. CBS's interest in WCIX, even with that station's technical deficiencies that limited over-the-air coverage, centered around wanting to purchase a Sun Belt station for a fraction of WTVJ's asking price. The inquiry ended when Laurence Tisch, who had recently taken over as network chairman, expressed worry that a station switch would depress the already slumping national ratings of the CBS Evening News. WTVJ general manager Alan Perris later claimed Tisch objected to Lorimar, who produced Dallas, Knots Landing and Falcon Crest for the network, wanting to purchase a significant portion of the affiliate base. According to Perris, Tisch threatened to disaffiliate all of the CBS stations in the Lorimar deal. Taft, which was undergoing a corporate restructuring, sold WCIX along with four other independent stations to the TVX Broadcast Group for a combined $240 million the following month; per a report in Electronic Media, CBS was still allowed to make an offer on WCIX while that transaction was taking place.

We had a sign out on our front lawn saying 'We'd like to purchase a TV station in a top 20 market. Please call this number if you have such a station to sell.' The fact one network had never bought another's affiliate in a hundred years was just a function of, well, not doing it.

— Bob Wright, NBC chairman

Following Lorimar's withdrawal, KKR still valued the station between $250 million and $300 million. Perris, who was also a WTVJ shareholder, later explained that the station needed to be sold for at least $270 million in order for everyone to break even and for him and the other shareholders to avoid owing money to KKR. CBS's offer to buy WTVJ for $170 million was thus rejected. The network claimed WTVJ was only worth half KKR's asking price at most, and most of its profits came from frequently preempting CBS programming. KKR then offered WTVJ to both Capital Cities/ABC Inc. and NBC parent company General Electric (GE), under the belief a competing network would not have their bids affected by a CBS disaffiliation threat, internally referred to as "that Channel 6 card". ABC declined the offer, but rumors of interest in WTVJ by NBC quickly emerged. Negotiations were purposefully kept hidden over the next few weeks in an effort to prevent Laurence Tisch from knowing anything in advance.

== Sale to NBC and the South Florida affiliation switch ==
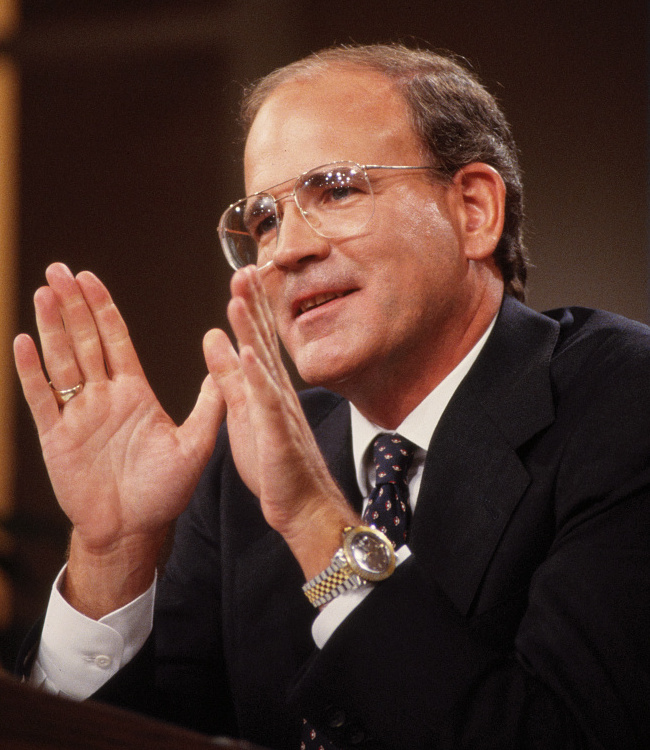
NBC chairman Bob Wright

On January 16, 1987, KKR agreed to sell WTVJ to a joint venture of NBC and General Electric Property Management Co. for $270 million, a markdown of $135 million from Lorimar's prior purchase agreement. For the first time in the history of North American television, a broadcast network directly purchased an affiliate of a competing network. NBC chairman Bob Wright attributed the uniqueness of the purchase to a relaxation in FCC regulations that increased the number of stations one company could own. CBS was conducting a meeting of its board of affiliates in the U.S. Virgin Islands when the news broke, so none of the company's executives were available for comment. Wright called Tisch, who was playing tennis, to tell him the news, saying, "[H]e was very gracious ... we didn't get into it in any detail, but I think he was surprised."

NBC president Raymond Timothy and vice president Pierson Mapes were tasked by Wright to inform Edmund Ansin, president of WSVN parent Sunbeam Television, of the WTVJ purchase in what Mapes later regarded as one of the worst moments of his career. Notified shortly before noon, Timothy recounted that Ansin said "You Expletive Deleted" at the news but honored a prior invite to lunch at a seafood restaurant on the 79th Street Causeway, picking up the tab. After returning to the WSVN studios, Ansin pointed at a satellite dish used to receive NBC programming and deadpanned to Timothy and Mapes, "Why don't you take it home on the airplane?" Ansin later described his reaction as "bewilderment", telling Timothy and Mapes it was "bizarre and certainly unprecedented". Despite Ansin's informal objection to the sale and lobbying from area elected officials on his behalf, the FCC approved the sale in September 1987.

=== An NBC-owned CBS affiliate ===
WTVJ's existing CBS contract ran out in April 1988, which raised the possibility of WTVJ being an NBC-owned CBS affiliate for a prolonged period. Due to WSVN's contract with NBC running until January 1, 1989, both networks agreed to extend WTVJ's CBS contract on a two-week basis for as long as was deemed necessary. WTVJ began liberally preempting CBS's primetime lineup for syndicated shows such as the Stacy Keach miniseries Hemingway, which displaced CBS programming over three consecutive nights in late April 1988. The airing of Hemingway preempted the second half of a two-part Newhart episode and a Hallmark Hall of Fame installment, the latter of which instead aired after the Sunday late news. Also preempted was a remake of I Saw What You Did written by Cuban exile and Miami native Cynthia Cidre in favor of a re-airing of the 1984 TV movie He's Not Your Son; WTVJ's program director said that the station was unaware of Cidre's local ties until after making the schedule change.

Alan Perris resigned as WTVJ general manager in May 1988, referring to the last few years of his tenure as a "horror story" where WTVJ was unable to compete amid the affiliation turmoil and CBS's faltering ratings. Perris was succeeded in the role by Dick Lobo, formerly of NBC-owned WMAQ-TV in Chicago; Lobo had begun his television career as a WTVJ reporter in 1958. CBS initially declined to invite Lobo to the network's 1988 affiliate convention, but he was invited after three direct attempts to reach the network.

Conventional wisdom from the beginning had WSVN taking over as the market's CBS affiliate once NBC programming moved to WTVJ. Negotiations between Ansin and CBS management, however, broke down by late April 1988 over a timeframe for the switch: Ansin insisted WSVN's NBC contract run as intended as the network was to carry the 1988 Summer Olympics and the 1988 World Series, as well as a majority of Miami Dolphins football games because of the network's AFC broadcast rights. Likewise, CBS was insistent on leaving WTVJ as soon as possible and did not want to remain affiliated with an NBC-owned station. Ansin made arrangements to fly to New York City on April 26 to sign a CBS contract at Black Rock when CBS affiliate relations director Tony Malara called off the meeting, citing that they were reaching out to other parties; Malara told Ansin the trip was pointless if he would not waver off of the January 1 date.

WCIX owner TVX found itself under increasing pressure to sell assets by Salomon Brothers—who financed the purchase of the Taft independent stations and held 60 percent ownership in the company—after a bond payment to the banker in early 1988 was missed. Electronic Media reported in late July 1988 that CBS quietly re-entered talks with the banker over WCIX. The Miami News reported on August 5 that CBS News president Howard Stringer, recently promoted to president of CBS's owned-stations division, expected a resolution to the Miami affiliation situation "very soon... probably by next week", while Ansin conceded CBS executives had not been in contact with him since April. CBS announced its purchase of WCIX three days later for $59 million, far below TVX's $90 million valuation of the station two years earlier. The move displaced Fox from WCIX, which signed WSVN up as a replacement affiliate.

The FCC approved the WCIX sale on October 31, 1988, but CBS had to legally wait at least 40 days before assuming operations and did not fully take over until January 3, 1989, preventing them from making a significant on-air promotional campaign. The network did, however, invest in an outdoor billboard campaign; one billboard for Murder, She Wrote on the South Dixie Highway featured a dagger piercing a numeral "4". Due to the consummation process, the affiliation changes were now slated to take place on January 1, when WSVN's NBC contract was to end, the date Ansin preferred and which WSVN management argued made CBS's insistence on an earlier date irrelevant. Malara countered by telling the Herald, "... if I had to wait anyway, why should I affiliate with [Ansin]? If I had to wait, screw him. Why not buy an asset?"

WTVJ, however, advertised the switch with a promotional campaign, internally dubbed Operation Peacock, which cost between $2 and $3 million. This included outreach at local malls, a bilingual 24-hour hotline, Spanish-language print and radio advertising (to attract the Cuban yuppie market), and television ads featuring a custom version of the recent hit song "Don't Worry, Be Happy" by Bobby McFerrin. A life-sized cardboard cutout of Bill Cosby was placed in the main lobby of the WTVJ studios. The campaign was remembered years later by local television critics Tom Jicha and Hal Boedeker as "grating", "annoying", and "over as soon as it started". The outreach to the Cuban community alienated viewers, particularly older ones; one station promo that asserted "When Castro falls, Channel 4 will be there!" was regarded by South Florida Sun-Sentinel critic Tom Jicha as "ticklish" and "feverish".

The final night of programming prior to the switches had both WSVN and WTVJ broadcast the King Orange Jamboree Parade; WTVJ's coverage had Sandy Duncan of The Hogan Family as a co-host, while WSVN ran NBC's coverage. At 3 a.m. on January 1, 1989, WTVJ interrupted the movie Love and Larceny to air a pre-recorded message from Lobo welcoming the station to the NBC network.

== Under NBC management ==
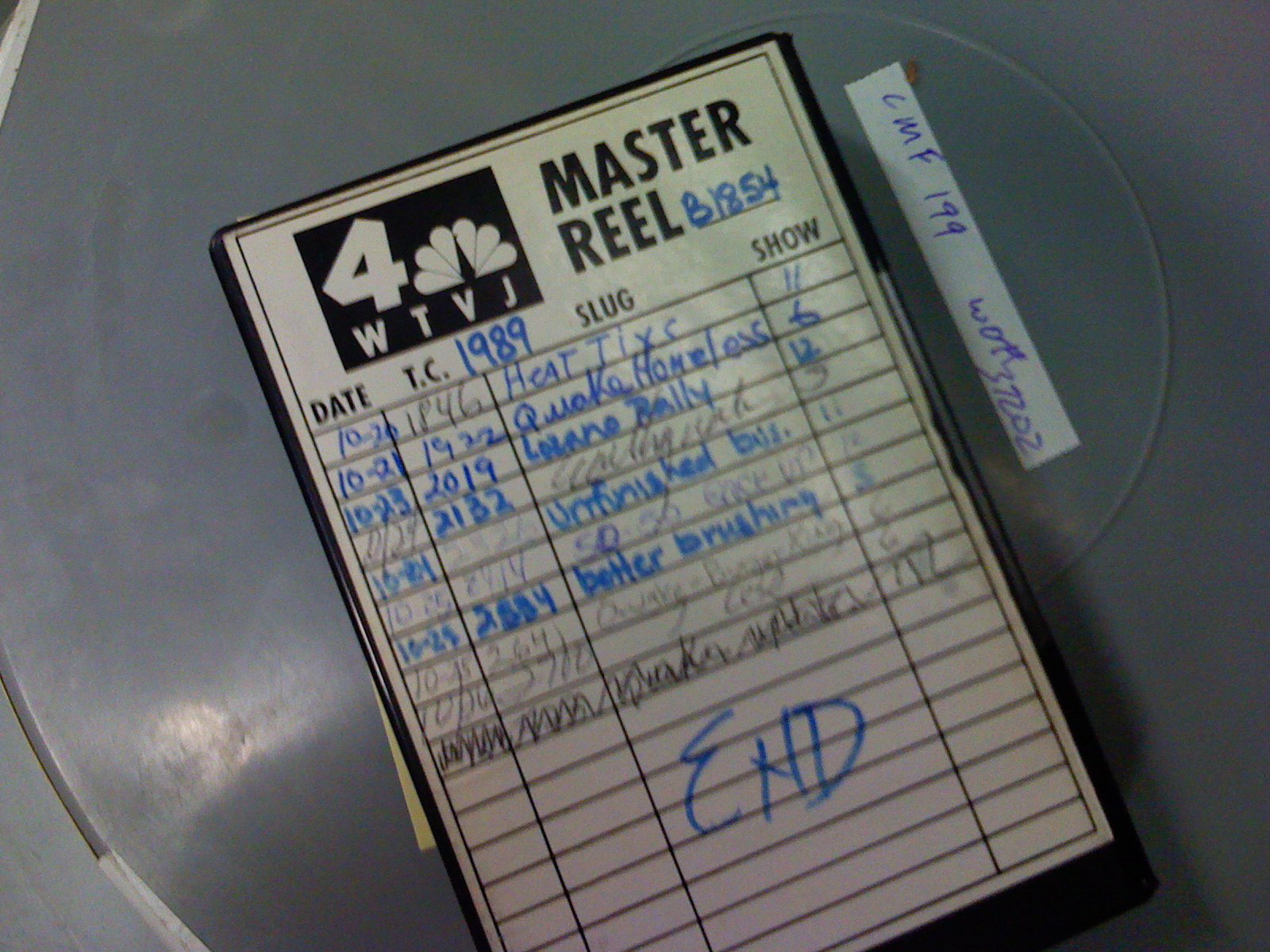
WTVJ archival news tape, 1989

NBC brought a major infusion of capital into the operation. KKR had paid so much for WTVJ that it limited the company's ability to make major expenditures. In 1988, NBC spent $11 million on a satellite newsgathering truck, equipment to broadcast in stereo, and a new news set. Debuting that August, WTVJ's aesthetics and logo were redesigned to have a contemporary feel, the news set included glass bricks and neon lighting reflective of Brickell Avenue architecture, and station promos were shot on 35 mm film, including music from the Miami Sound Machine. Lobo brought new faces to the station, including José Díaz-Balart, a former anchor for the Spanish International Network and HBC, who became a general assignment reporter. A half-hour morning newscast, Today in South Florida, debuted on January 16; WSVN decried the title's similarity to its own Today in Florida, which had been named for The Today Show when WSVN was the NBC affiliate.

WTVJ's ratings performance following the switch was largely mixed: NBC programming created a halo effect for WTVJ at 11 p.m., but the station fell to third place behind WPLG and WSVN in late afternoons. Lead anchor John Hambrick left for WCIX at the end of 1989. Lobo believed the lack of a star anchor played up the entire news team, but others felt that it further deprived the station of an identity in local news, a perception that continued throughout Lobo's tenure.

WTVJ's rolling coverage of Hurricane Andrew in 1992 won viewer and industry praise. Meteorologist Bryan Norcross spent most of 22 hours on the air and led the coverage, which Hal Boedeker of the Miami Herald described as the "class of the field" and a "tour de force on many levels". Norcross had spent five years as the second-string weeknight weatherman at WPLG before moving to WTVJ in 1990. Norcross, who prior to the hurricane had been uncertain if he would be retained after his contract ran out later in the year, instead signed a three-year extension. After Andrew, longtime sports anchor Tony Segreto—who had just begun anchoring the 5 p.m. news months before—was elevated to main evening anchor; he replaced Tom Randles, who had been criticized by station staff for hunkering down with family instead of anchoring. Segreto's conversion drew comparisons to Brent Musburger and Jim Lampley, both sportscasters that switched to anchor roles. The Andrew coverage won WTVJ its second Peabody Award, with the judges noting its combination of "spot news and philanthropic effort", and another duPont–Columbia Award. The May 1993 NBC television movie Triumph Over Disaster: The Hurricane Andrew Story dramatized much of the station's coverage, with Ted Wass portraying Norcross.

Whoever is at the top sets the tone. One newscast they seem to want to be kind of an upscale competitor of Channel 10, and the next, they try to best Channel 7.

— Michael Putney, WPLG reporter and former WTVJ reporter, on Dick Lobo

Despite the hurricane coverage, WTVJ continued to suffer problems stemming from low-rated NBC daytime programming, turnover in anchor personnel, and a news style that aped WSVN. Joel Cheatwood, WSVN's vice president of news, once jokingly threatened to bill Lobo for consultant work, to which WTVJ news director Sharon Scott replied, "they copy us as much as we copy them". In the February 1993 sweeps, WTVJ's 5 p.m. news ranked behind Geraldo on WCIX in both the Nielsen and Arbitron books. One unnamed television executive told the Herald that WTVJ felt like "... a confused station with no identity ... everything seems to be done on the moment".

In September 1993, citing "philosophical differences", NBC replaced Lobo with a longtime NBC employee, Don Browne, who had just left his post as second-in-command at NBC News and previously ran its Miami bureau. Though his job had been in New York, he still lived with his family in South Florida and had been in WTVJ's studio when Andrew hit. Unlike Lobo, Browne believed WTVJ was "looking over its shoulder" at WSVN too much and felt the station needed to find a news identity. WTVJ won another duPont–Columbia Award in 1994 for its coverage of the crisis in Haiti.

Jennifer Valoppi, formerly of WWOR-TV in New York, joined WTVJ in January 1994 and initially was intended to anchor a new 4:30 p.m. newscast. When anchor Michele Gillen (Note: Gillen was reassigned to WTVJ the previous year after a report on the Chevrolet C/K led by Gillen on Dateline NBC was later revealed to have included staged explosions; Lobo pursued Gillen as an anchor months before the Dateline report aired.) unexpectedly departed, Valoppi became the station's lead female anchor. A year later, she was joined at the station by Jackie Nespral, who had been the co-host of Weekend Today for the network but wanted to stop commuting to and from New York.

== Move to channel 6 ==
The Grade A signal contours of channels 4 and 6 in Miami as they existed in the early 1990s. Channel 4's signal (red) broadcast from a tower midway between Miami and Fort Lauderdale and provided primary coverage of areas from Boca Raton in the north to Goulds in the south. Channel 6's signal (blue) broadcast from a tower at Homestead, in the southern portion of the metropolitan area, and did not adequately reach populous areas in Broward County north of Fort Lauderdale–Hollywood International Airport.

On May 23, 1994, Fox and New World Communications entered an alliance under which Fox bought an equity stake in New World, which would switch most of its stations from Big Three networks to Fox. This deal, struck less than six months after Fox obtained CBS's longtime rights to televise the National Football Conference of the NFL, contained a groupwide multi-year affiliation agreement that would change network affiliations of the majority of stations owned by—or in the process of being acquired by—New World to Fox after each existing contract expired. This agreement triggered a round of affiliation switches in markets nationwide as new group deals were carved out. Less than a month later, ABC and Scripps-Howard Broadcasting struck a deal that included, among other stations, WMAR-TV in Baltimore, Maryland, joining the network. Westinghouse Broadcasting (Group W) was the owner of Baltimore's outgoing ABC affiliate WJZ-TV and already talking to Fox, CBS, and NBC on an affiliation deal of their own.

On July 14, 1994, Group W and CBS agreed to a group-wide 10-year contract; this renewed Group W's two existing CBS affiliations and switched the other three to CBS, including longtime NBC affiliate KYW-TV in Philadelphia. As part of the deal, Group W and CBS formed a joint venture to acquire other television stations and operate a syndication company. This necessitated CBS to sell off WCAU-TV, their owned-and-operated station in Philadelphia: NBC and Fox made offers for WCAU-TV, while CBS expressed interest in conducting an asset swap. In September 1994, Fox agreed to purchase existing Philadelphia affiliate WTXF-TV. With NBC remaining as the only bidder for WCAU-TV, talks began in earnest over a swap of stations between the two networks. This "horse trading" transaction was largely confirmed on November 21, 1994, with the Group W–CBS joint venture receiving KCNC-TV in Denver and KUTV in Salt Lake City, along with WTVJ's channel 4 license and transmitter site, from NBC; in turn, NBC acquired both WCAU-TV and WCIX's channel 6 license and transmitter site. (Note: The deal was structured in such a way that WFOR-TV operates on the former WTVJ license and WTVJ operates on the former WCIX license.)

In the swap, CBS upgraded and NBC downgraded. During its tenure as a CBS station, WCIX on channel 6 had been among the network's weakest outlets. Howard Stringer told the media within a year of the move that CBS owning WCIX was "a disaster" and that with its signal troubles, "We can never be better than third". WCIX had a reputation of being one of the lowest-rated CBS affiliates for large events, such as the Super Bowl and television miniseries. The channel 6 problem, which had been CBS's since 1989, would soon become NBC's issue.

The switch was intended to be executed in early July, but delays in obtaining FCC approval pushed it back; the commission granted the transfers in August, setting up the switch for 1 a.m. on September 10, 1995. At that time, WTVJ and NBC programming moved to channel 6, while WCIX and CBS programming moved to channel 4 under the new call sign of WFOR-TV. Upon taking over channel 6, NBC acquired two of its dependent translators, upgraded one, and added another. In the immediate aftermath, NBC's ratings fell, but CBS ratings did not improve. Bryan Norcross, who desired to no longer work the 11 p.m. newscast, resigned from WTVJ that November before signing a contract with WFOR-TV three months later.

Díaz-Balart departed in 1996 to co-anchor CBS This Morning. The next year, WTVJ introduced a 10 p.m. newscast on WB affiliate WDZL (channel 39) and removed the standing set, the last vestige of the Lobo-era news presentation. Segreto completed his transition from sports to news by relinquishing weeknight sports anchoring in 1997; Joe Rose and Craig Minervini took his place anchoring the sportscasts on weeknights.

We were written off in 1995 like we were dead because of the signal switch. ... We came back and succeeded by following a course of doing solid, old-fashioned journalism. We didn't promote breast-size stories. I think the intelligence of the audience is paying off.

— Don Browne

In spite of the channel switch, WTVJ's news format found traction in the ratings. In the May 1998 Nielsen sweeps, WTVJ had the number-one English-language newscast at 11 p.m. for the first time since November 1994, before the channel switch, and moved into second among English-language stations in early evenings. It was the first of three consecutive wins in late news, a first for WTVJ since the Renick years and among several in the late 1990s and early 2000s, as Browne emphasized "solid, old-fashioned journalism". In 2000, WPXM-TV (channel 35), Miami's Pax station, began rebroadcasting WTVJ's evening newscasts as part of a national agreement between NBC and Pax. That March, WTVJ's helicopter crashed after covering an accident; the pilot and a cameraman were killed when the helicopter's rotors struck the tail.

== Move to Miramar, digitalization, and combination with WSCV ==
WTVJ began negotiations to sell its downtown Miami studios in 1997. Browne noted that the former Capitol Theater was "crumbling" and the station had run out of room. For a new location, the station scouted sites in Dade and Broward counties. In April 1998, the station closed on an $11.6 million sale of the property to the federal government, which planned to raze the old theater and construct new courthouses and offices; WTVJ had two years to vacate the premises. Miami city and Miami-Dade County officials attempted to keep WTVJ from leaving the city, but many of the Miami-Dade incentives hinged on the creation of new jobs, not relevant to the station. WTVJ agreed in July 1998 to build its new main studio in Miramar, in Broward County, though it would maintain a Miami studio in another downtown locale. The move was seen by Steve Bousquet, a writer for the Miami Herald and former Broward news reporter for WPLG, as an acknowledgement of the increasing population of Broward, whose news was once relegated to secondary status on Miami TV stations.

The 76,000-square-foot (7,100 m^{2}) Miramar studio, near Interstate 75 and Miramar Parkway, opened in July 2000 at a cost of $26 million. Designed by Arquitectonica, it featured a Mediterranean architectural theme (in compliance with city building codes) as well as a heliport. (Note: The old Capitol Theater was razed in 2002.) The facility was tapeless, with programming and commercial segments played off servers. It was the first time that NBC had built a new studio for a station since 1988. Miramar served as a hub for master control and commercial insertion operations for the stations NBC owned in the Southeast, including WVTM-TV in Birmingham, Alabama; KXAS-TV in Fort Worth, Texas; and WNCN in Raleigh, North Carolina. The Miami second studio plan materialized in 2000 as a streetside studio in the corner of the new American Airlines Arena. It opened in December 2001 and housed six reporters and robotic cameras that could be controlled from Miramar.

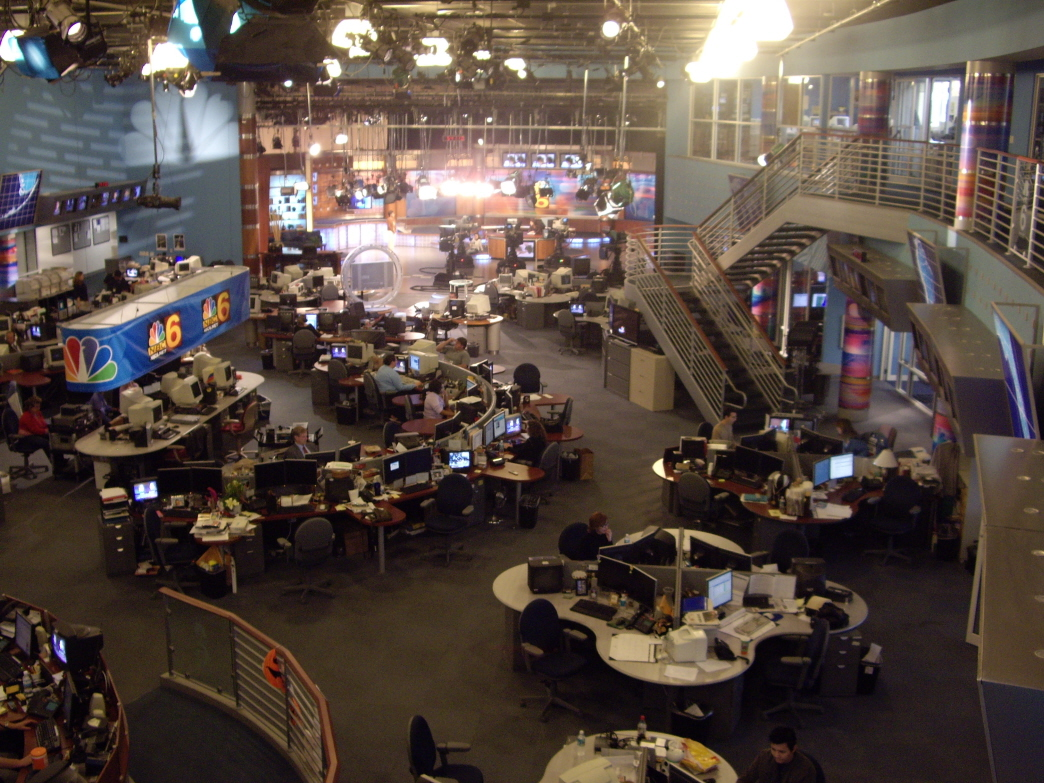
WTVJ's former newsroom in 2006

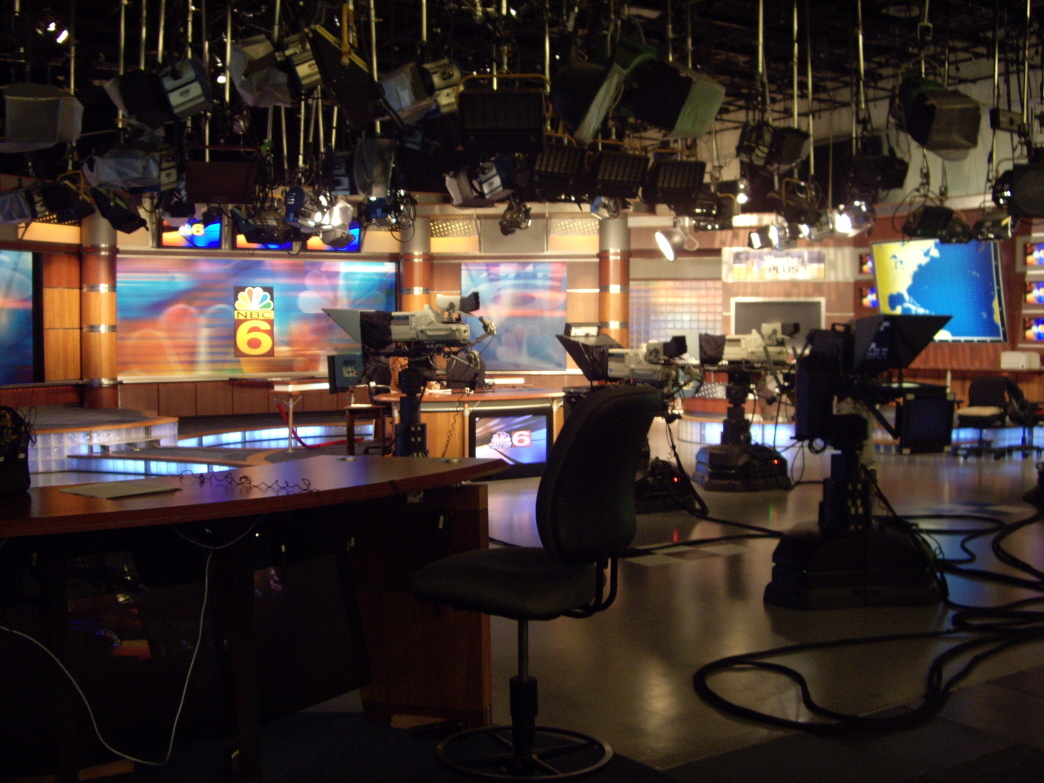
WTVJ's former set in 2006

While WTVJ's digital signal was not constrained by the short-spacing problem that had limited channel 6, it was delayed by other allocation issues. The original channel assigned to WTVJ would not have allowed it to return to a centrally located transmitter site. WTVJ and WPXM-TV both sought to use channel 31. After NBC bought a stake in Pax, the latter agreed to pursue channel 26. This led to a conflict between Paxson and WXEL-TV, the public television station for the West Palm Beach area, which had planned its digital facility on channel 26. In October 2002, the parties reached a settlement that saw NBC pay $6.4 million to WXEL-TV and $2.25 million to Pax. Digital broadcasting—from North Dade—began in July 2003, using the same candelabra tower NBC erected for the station in 1993 when it operated on channel 4.

NBC bought Telemundo, including its South Florida station WSCV (channel 51), in 2001. This came after Browne had discussed expanding into Spanish-language broadcasting with Wright. When the Miramar facility was built, NBC was contemplating purchasing another station (either a Spanish-language outlet, potentially a low-power station, or WPXM), and provision was made to house a second station there, including a second studio and 12,000 square feet (1,100 m^{2}) of unused office space. WSCV moved to Miramar in 2002. The combination bolstered the news resources available to WSCV while giving WTVJ access to the Telemundo station's bilingual talent and connections. In 2003, NBC named Browne the chief operating officer of Telemundo, ending his decade-long tenure running WTVJ. That same year, Díaz-Balart, now the anchor for Telemundo's morning show Hoy en el Mundo, returned to WTVJ as 5 p.m. co-anchor in addition to his Telemundo duties; Diaz-Balart was at WTVJ until 2009, when he was elevated to anchor Telemundo's nightly newscast.

In October 2003, WTVJ debuted a local afternoon talk show, The Rick Sanchez Show, featuring Rick Sanchez—returning to local TV after a stint at MSNBC and prior to that a decade at WSVN. Management hoped that Sanchez could shore up the station's flagging ratings in the early fringe timeslot, where the station remained last in spite of leading at 11 p.m. and coming in second in the morning. The program performed poorly in the ratings, beaten soundly by other syndicated shows and the cartoon Pokémon on WBZL. Sanchez also served as the interim anchor for the WBZL newscast. He left WTVJ after less than a year. November 2003 saw the involuntary retirement of Bob Weaver, who by then was working weekend mornings as a part-timer; Weaver died in 2006 and was recognized for both his lengthy tenure at the station and ties to the Renick era. After the move to Miramar, Valoppi decided to reduce her workload to the early evening newscasts and cease working nights. She was replaced at 11 p.m. by Nespral in February 2001; in October 2004, WTVJ elected not to renew Valoppi's contract, and she left the station at year's end.

== Attempted sale to Post-Newsweek Stations and digital era ==
In March 2008, NBC began accepting offers on two of its owned-and-operated stations, WTVJ and WVIT serving Hartford, Connecticut. Four months later, Post-Newsweek Stations, owner of WPLG, announced it would purchase WTVJ in a deal valued at $205 million. This would have put the NBC and ABC affiliates in Miami under common ownership; though this was not permissible in most markets where both affiliates were in the top four in total-day ratings under FCC rules, WTVJ was sixth per Nielsen (with WLTV third and WSCV fifth). The deal passed Hart–Scott–Rodino antitrust review by the Department of Justice and Federal Trade Commission in October, but the FCC had yet to grant approval. In December, after three members of Congress came out against the transaction, the commission opened a public comment window. Shortly after, on December 23, the transaction was called off entirely, with both parties agreeing to abandon the sale citing "the current economic environment and the delay in receiving the necessary regulatory approval".

In 2009, WTVJ hired John Morales as its chief meteorologist; Morales had previously worked for WSCV and filled in on Weekend Today from 2003 to 2008, in addition to prior work for WLTV and Univision. That same year, Tony Segreto retired, concluding a 40-year career at WTVJ as a sportscaster and news anchor. Another Ralph Renick protégé, Bob Mayer, retired in 2010, taking advantage of a contract buyout option as NBCUniversal was being sold from GE to Comcast. Mayer had joined WTVJ in 1969 as an intern under Renick before becoming a feature reporter and anchor and—aside from a stint in the early 1980s in Hartford, Connecticut, and the CNN bureau in Miami—had spent the majority of his career at the station.

WTVJ's analog signal in Homestead ceased regular programming on June 12, 2009, as part of the transition from analog to digital television, with the digital signal continuing to use channel 31; the analog signal transmitted taped information about the transition under the SAFER Act until June 26, 2009, when it was turned off. In early 2011, WTVJ launched NBC Nonstop, a digital subchannel exclusive to NBC owned-stations devoted to news and lifestyle shows, with eight hours per day originating from Miami; this service was discontinued at the end of 2012 and replaced with Cozi TV.

By the early 2010s, WTVJ had slipped back into third place, though it soon moved into second place after a change in station group management. The station changed branding from NBC Miami to NBC South Florida to reduce the perception that its newscasts focused on Miami-area news and not on the broader market. In 2013, it cut the length of its 11 p.m. sportscast; the next year, in a three-month span, it bought out Joe Rose's contract, eliminated sports in the 6 p.m. news, and canceled its longtime Sunday night sports show, Sports Final. Roy Firestone, who had worked as a sportscaster at the station until 1975, wrote a letter to the general manager criticizing him for letting news director Migdalia Figueroa make such deep cuts to sports coverage.

Management of WTVJ was placed under WSCV's general manager, Jorge Carballo, on January 1, 2020. Under Carballo, WTVJ and WSCV exited a shared helicopter arrangement with other stations and secured the services of their own helicopter. A 7 p.m. newscast, launched as a temporary program during the COVID-19 pandemic, became permanent. Since 2022, WTVJ's newscasts have been simulcast over Peacock as FAST channel NBC South Florida News, in conjunction with other NBC owned-stations; this was extended to Pluto TV in May 2024. In 2023, WTVJ debuted a weekday lifestyle show, South Florida Live, with features and sponsored segments.

In 2023, WTVJ became Miami's first ATSC 3.0 (NextGen TV) station on January 5, 2023, providing ATSC 3.0 broadcasts of the main channels of WFOR, WTVJ, WBFS-TV, and WSCV as well as WPBT on a test basis. WTVJ was one of four NBC-owned stations to roll out an app-based experience using the 3.0 platform in April 2024.

== Notable former on-air staff ==
- Red Barber – sportscaster
- David Bloom – reporter, 1989–1993
- Jimmy Cefalo – host of PM Magazine and AM South Florida, 1982–1985
- Joel Connable – reporter and anchor, 2006–2009
- Kevin Corke – anchor/reporter, c. 2010
- Lindsay Czarniak – sports reporter, –2005
- Paul Deanno – chief meteorologist, 2006–2009
- Rich Funke – sportscaster, 1980–1981
- Bob Gallagher – sportscaster, 1966–1972
- Bernard Goldberg
- Hank Goldberg – sportscaster, 1983–1993
- Suzy Kolber – sports intern
- Alycia Lane – weekend anchor and reporter
- Tom Llamas – reporter, 2005–2008
- Antonio Mora – reporter and anchor, 1992–1993
- DeMarco Morgan – anchor, until 2008
- Frank Mottek – overnight reporter, 1991–1992
- Jim Mueller – sports anchor and play-by-play announcer, 1972–1974
- Chris Myers – sports anchor, 1981–1982
- Nancy O'Dell – anchor/reporter, 1994–1995 (known as Nancy Humphries at WTVJ)
- Micah Ohlman – reporter and 10 p.m. news anchor, early 2000s
- Jerry Penacoli – producer and host of PM Magazine, 1979–1982
- Kristina Pink – sports reporter
- Michael Putney – reporter
- Lonnie Quinn – morning meteorologist, 2002–2007
- Eliott Rodriguez – reporter
- Karie Ross – sportscaster, 1992–1996
- Kerry Sanders – reporter, 1991–1996
- Robin Swoboda – anchor, 1985–1986 (known as Robin Cole at WTVJ)
- Martha Teichner – reporter, 1973–1975
- Roger Twibell – sportscaster, 1976–1978
- Amara Walker – anchor and reporter, 2005–2012 (known as Amara Sohn at WTVJ)

== Technical information ==
=== Subchannels ===
Subchannels provided by WTVJ (ATSC 1.0)
Subchannel	Res.	Short name	Programming	ATSC 1.0 host
6.1	1080i	WTVJ	NBC	WSCV
6.2	480i	COZI TV	Cozi TV	WSCV
6.3	480i	AMCRIME	NBC True CRMZ	WSCV
6.4	480i	Oxygen	Oxygen	WAMI-DT

=== ATSC 3.0 lighthouse ===
WTVJ's transmitter is located near Andover, Florida.

Subchannels of WTVJ (ATSC 3.0)
Subchannel	Res.	Short name	Programming
2.1	1080p	WPBT-HD	PBS (WPBT)
2.5	1080p	PBSWRLD	World Channel
4.1	1080p	WFOR-TV	CBS (WFOR-TV)
6.1	1080p	WTVJ-DT	NBC
23.1	1080p	WLTV-DT	Univision (WLTV-DT)
51.1	1080p	WSCV-DT	Telemundo (WSCV)

- Subchannel broadcast with digital rights management
- Subchannel streamed via the Internet
