= Don Browne (television executive) =

American media executive (1943–2023)

- Born: May 30, 1943; Toms River, New Jersey, U.S.
- Died: August 29, 2023 (aged 80)
- Education: University of South Carolina
- Occupation: Media executive
- Spouse: Maria Josefa Junquera (m. 1981; died 2021)
- Children: 2

Don Browne (May 30, 1943 – August 29, 2023) was an American media executive who was president of Telemundo following a tenure at NBC News.

== Life and career ==
Browne was born in Toms River, New Jersey, on May 30, 1943, and was educated at Toms River High School (since renamed Toms River High School South and Bordentown Military Institute, before enrolling at the University of South Carolina. He began his career with CBS & ABC before joining NBC in 1979, as a news bureau chief in Miami. In 1989, he became an executive with NBC News, first working on the Today show and then as an executive vice president of NBC News. He was later named president and general manager of WTVJ, the NBC affiliate in Miami, before his leadership of Telemundo began in 2005. He retired in 2011.

Browne married Maria Josefa Junquera in 1981; they had two children. She died from cancer in 2021. Shortly thereafter, Browne himself was diagnosed with a brain tumor, which he died from on August 29, 2023, at the age of 80.
