= Manolo Reyes =

American journalist

Manolo de Jesus Reyes Xiques JD (July 29, 1924 – January 3, 2008) was a Cuban-American Spanish-language television news broadcaster in Miami, Florida. Reyes became a television news pioneer in the 1960s when he began one of South Florida's first Spanish-language newscasters. His first 15-minute news show, News En Español, debuted on WTVJ on August 28, 1960, at 6:45 am, at a time when Spanish-language broadcasts were rare in the Miami metropolitan area. His original broadcasts were aimed at making news accessible to the growing Spanish-speaking, Miami-based Cuban exile community.

== Early life ==
Reyes was born in Cuba, where he worked as a child actor, radio performer and singer. He obtained a law degree from the University of Havana before moving to the United States.

== Spanish-language news ==
Manolo Reyes, who resided in the Miami area in the 1950s and 1960s, realized that there were no television news shows aimed at the growing Cuban exile community, especially after the Communist takeover of Cuba by Fidel Castro in the Cuban Revolution.

Despite his limited English, Reyes pitched his idea to the founder of WTVJ, Mitchell Wolfson, and Miami television pioneer Ralph Renick. Renick and Wolfson agreed to let Reyes tape a test show. The station had to have the test show critiqued by a University of Miami linguistics professor because no one at WTVJ (Channel 4) spoke Spanish at the time.

Wolfson agreed to broadcast Reyes' Spanish-language news segments. Reyes' first 15-minute news show, News En Español, debuted on August 28, 1960. News En Español aired on weekdays at 6:45 am, just before the Skipper Chuck Show, and at 1 am, just before the WTVJ's sign-off for the night. Spanish-speaking viewers, especially the Cuban exile community, were delighted by Reyes's news show, despite the difficult viewing times. Conversely, non-Spanish speakers were equally outraged by the broadcast of an all-Spanish show.

Reyes' newscast was so popular that it was gradually expanded. His initial assignments for the station usually involved coverage of Miami's arriving Cuban refugees. Reyes remained at WTVJ for 19 years and was promoted to the station's Latin America news editor. Reyes also became a regular contributor on the WTVJ's well-known English-language show The Ralph Renick Report. He also began contributing nationally on Walter Cronkite's CBS Evening News.

He left television after 19 years. He obtained a second law degree from the University of Miami before becoming an executive director at Mercy Hospital in Miami. He remained at that position for nearly 20 years until his retirement in 2005.

Reyes was honored for his pioneering work in television by the Miami Chapter of the National Academy of Television Arts and Sciences in 1991.

== Community work ==
Reyes founded a number of Miami community organizations including the YMCA Jose Martí, the Cuban Sertoma Club, and the Spanish Post of Veterans of Foreign Wars. He also served on the board of directors several other organizations, including the Hialeah-Miami Springs Chamber of Commerce, Easter Seals, the United Way and Barry University.

== Awards ==
Reyes was the recipient of several awards for his work in the media and nonprofit arenas, as well as the greater Miami-Dade community including...

- An Emmy Award for broadcast journalism.
- The Key to the City of Hialeah
- The Key to the City of Key West
- The Archbishop Hurley Award
- Pentagon Award for Human Goals

== Death ==
Manolo Reyes died of complications from Parkinson's disease at 7:57 PM (23:57 GMT) on January 3, 2008, at the age of 83. His funeral was held at Saints Peter & Paul Roman Catholic Church in Miami. Reyes was survived by his wife Graciela, three children, Manolo Jr., Charlie and Grace, 10 grandchildren and four great-grandchildren.

Reyes was buried in Woodlawn Park Cemetery in Miami, Florida, on January 4, 2008.
