= Jane Chastain =

Jane Chastain (née Steppe; born March 12, 1943) was the first woman to do a sports play-by-play for a major network and is a current conservative political writer and commentator.

== Early life ==
Chastain was born in Knoxville, Tennessee. to Lina Katherine (née Abernathy) and Quentin Steppe, their only child. The family moved to Smyrna, Georgia (outside of Atlanta), where she attended school. As a child she had buck teeth, which earned her the nickname "Bugs Bunny." She was also awkward. Braces, maturity, modeling school, and speech training removed these childhood deficiencies. She spent the last two years of high school working as a model in Atlanta and then enrolled at Georgia State College to continue her career. However, her modeling was somewhat limited by her 5'3" frame. One day she happened to see herself on a TV monitor and realized that if she had a career in television, size wouldn't matter. Her initial ambition was to have a kids show.

== Career ==
Chastain began her sportscasting career in 1963 when she heard that WAGA-TV (Atlanta) was casting about for a young girl to play the part of a football coach and make weekly predictions. She landed the job and turned out to be good at it. Her fame spread. The following year a Toronto newspaper asked her to predict the winner in the Grey Cup. She successfully picked the underdog to win. Slippery Rock State College invited her to their Pennsylvania campus for a season preview where they awarded her letters in five sports and made her an honorary member of the coaching staff. She began doing a scoreboard show after the games and eventually became the weekend sports anchor. She appeared on the October 25, 1964, episode of What's My Line? as Mrs. Jane Thomas (episode available on YouTube). During her time in Atlanta, she broke many sports journalistic barriers. In 1967 she became the first female on a National Baseball League playing field and was admitted to the Atlanta Braves and the Atlanta Falcons press boxes. After her marriage to Roger Chastain in 1968, she moved to Raleigh, North Carolina, and was hired by WRAL-TV. In 1969 she was hired by Miami TV station WTVJ-TV.

While in Miami working as a sports reporter, she did a daily radio show, "Girls Rules," explaining the finer points in sports, which was syndicated to 205 stations in all 48 contiguous states. She gained the respect of Dolphins coach Don Shula, who admitted that he was skeptical of her ability when he first arrived, but she soon gained his respect.

She jumped to national TV with "The Jane Chastain Show – Everything You've Always Wanted to Know About Sports but Were Afraid to Ask."

CBS hired her in 1974 to provide commentary for various televised sports events. During the CBS National Football League telecast of a game on October 13, 1974, she became the first female NFL announcer, brought in as a commentator alongside Don Criqui and Irv Cross. The mail and telephone calls ran heavily against her. Bob Wussler, CBS vice president in charge of sports, admitted that he made a mistake by using her on a major team sport and not introducing her slowly. "The biggest problem was that she was the first."

Chastain was used on occasional NFL broadcasts the rest of the 1974 season and also worked the college Sun Bowl Game that season. She also worked on some CBS National Basketball Association telecasts. She landed an exclusive interview with Portland Trail Blazers' 7'2" center Bill Walton, who had been injured. She went live on CBS's halftime show and was praised for her work. Soon afterward, she informed the network that she was pregnant. After that she was assigned mostly features.

When the network failed to renew her contract, she returned to Miami television, where Bernie Rosen, the long-time sports director for WTVJ, was only too happy to have her. "She was always good. She knew her stuff. She could do everything well. She was a terrific interviewer. She had everything going for her, but the timing (at the network) was all wrong. Nowadays, she'd be a superstar." In 1977, she moved to Los Angeles, where she began working for KABC-TV.

During the 1980s, Chastain began turning her attention toward politics. She hosted a radio program, What Washington Doesn't Want You to Know, as well as served on a number of boards and commissions. She writes for conservative-leaning online publications such as WorldNetDaily, and has written several books about politics.

== Personal life ==
Chastain married Skip Thomas, a local television host and producer (1962–1965) who had nothing to do with her athletic success. She married industrial designer John Roger Chastain (1968–2021), who, at the time, was one of the Southeast's leading sports car drivers. They were pilots and live on a private runway in southern California, Roger died in 2021 due to COVID-19 complications. They have one son, Blayne, born June 16, 1975.
