= WGBS-TV =

Television station in Miami (1953–1957)

- Miami, Florida; United States
- Channels: Analog: 23 (UHF)

Programming
- Affiliations: NBC (1953–1956); Independent (1956–1957)

Ownership
- Owner: Storer Broadcasting Company

History
- First air date: May 5, 1953
- Last air date: April 13, 1957

Technical information
- ERP: 186 kW
- HAAT: 920 ft (280 m)
- Transmitter coordinates: 25°57′27″N 80°12′43″W

WGBS-TV was a television station that broadcast on channel 23 in Miami, Florida, United States, from 1953 to 1957. Originally established as WFTL-TV in Fort Lauderdale, it moved south to Miami when it was purchased by Storer Broadcasting at the end of 1954 and consolidated with a construction permit Storer bought for a Miami station.

For most of its history, channel 23 was South Florida's NBC affiliate. However, as a UHF station, the arrival of further VHF stations in the Miami area severely limited its viability. In 1956, WCKT (channel 7) in Miami signed on as an NBC affiliate. WGBS-TV signed off the air in 1957 and sold its facilities to National Airlines, which was about to put WPST-TV (channel 10) into service. Storer retained the UHF construction permit and sold it to Coastal Broadcasting System, which used it in 1967 to put WAJA-TV, predecessor to today's WLTV, on air on channel 23.

== Establishment in Fort Lauderdale ==
When the Federal Communications Commission (FCC) lifted its four-year-old freeze on television station applications in 1948, channels 17 and 23 were placed in Fort Lauderdale, Florida. Applications for both allotments were received, and on July 30, 1952, the FCC granted channel 17 to Gerico Investment and channel 23 to Gore Publishing Company, owner of radio station WFTL (1400 AM) and the Fort Lauderdale Daily News. Both groups had originally filed for channel 17.

By January 1953, studios for the new television station were under construction on the third and fourth floors of downtown Fort Lauderdale's Mercantile Building, and an estimated start date of April 1 was announced. The station narrowly missed the date; the antenna was erected on April 2, and test patterns began to go out on the morning of April 7. Before full commercial programming started on May 5, however, Gore Publishing announced that a majority stake in the WFTL broadcasting stations had been sold to Noran E. Kersta, a former NBC employee who was the first general manager of WFTL-TV, under the auspices of Tri-County Broadcasting Company.

WFTL-TV, the first UHF station in the entire state and the third behind WTVJ (channel 4) in Miami and WMBR-TV in Jacksonville, brought South Florida TV viewers a choice in programming for the first time. NBC output had previously been seen in its entirety on WTVJ, which offered channel 23 air time on its station to promote itself, its programs, and the conversion of sets to UHF. However, even after channel 23 started up, some NBC shows continued to be seen on channel 4. The other Fort Lauderdale station, Gerico's WITV on channel 17, joined WFTL-TV on the air on December 1, 1953.

In August 1954, officials from WITV and WFTL-TV announced they were pursuing a merger agreement to avoid competition among UHF stations with the threat of networks' preference for VHF stations looming. Their announcement followed a more definite report by the Miami Herald that WITV was to buy out the other station, with channel 17 surviving the merger. However, no agreement could be reached on particulars of a combination after three months, and for WFTL-TV, ownership was at a crossroads: invest or sell.

Tri-County first chose to invest, announcing a $500,000 capital infusion in late September, including a new 1,000-foot (300 m) tower and other equipment to turn channel 23 into the most powerful UHF station in the nation, as well as a full-time NBC affiliation. Further, WFTL-TV would become a hub for production of kinescopes of sports events, such as the World Series and boxing matches, for distribution throughout Latin America. R. G. Gore declared that, despite the obstacles of running a UHF station, "we still have faith in its future".

== Moving to Miami ==
Miami was allocated UHF channels 27 and 33 in 1952, and two applicants filed for channel 27: Robert Rounsaville, owner of radio station WMBM (790 AM), and the Sun Coast Broadcasting Corporation, which was half-owned by Miami radio station WMIE, a business of former Georgia governor E. D. Rivers. Rounsaville dropped his application in early December, and within hours, the FCC granted a construction permit to WMIE. Taking the call sign WMIE-TV, officials hoped to have channel 27 operational within four to six months. In allocating channels 17 and 23 to Fort Lauderdale and 27 and 33 to Miami, however, the FCC created something of a problem. WFTL-TV wanted to upgrade, but if it moved further south to the Dade–Broward county line, it would be too close in frequency to the unbuilt WMIE-TV at Miami. As a result, in October 1954, WFTL-TV petitioned the FCC to have channels 27 and 33 for Miami changed to 29 and 35; the FCC responded by keeping channel 33 and instead proposing to change channel 27 to 39.

The next turn of events, however, assured there would be no problem at all. In November, Storer Broadcasting announced its purchase of WFTL-TV's assets and the unbuilt WMIE-TV, which would be combined to give Storer its seventh television station and second UHF, then the limit. Storer was one of the largest broadcasters in South Florida, operating WGBS (710 AM) and WGBS-FM 96.3 and having recently built new corporate offices in Miami Beach; it had attempted to apply for VHF channel 10 there but was denied because it already owned five VHF stations, the maximum allowed on that band. Storer paid $300,000 for WFTL-TV and $35,410 in Rivers's out-of-pocket expenses for the construction permit, pledging to carry out the expansion program that had been announced months prior.

The FCC approved the three-party deal in mid-December. On December 24, WFTL-TV became the Miami-licensed WGBS-TV on what technically was the old WMIE-TV permit. The first phase of what was planned to be a multipart program of technical improvements followed in January 1955, with effective radiated power raised from 23,000 to 185,000 watts. Radio station WINZ and the permittee for channel 33, WMFL, asked for a rehearing on the Storer purchases, which was denied.

== Demise ==
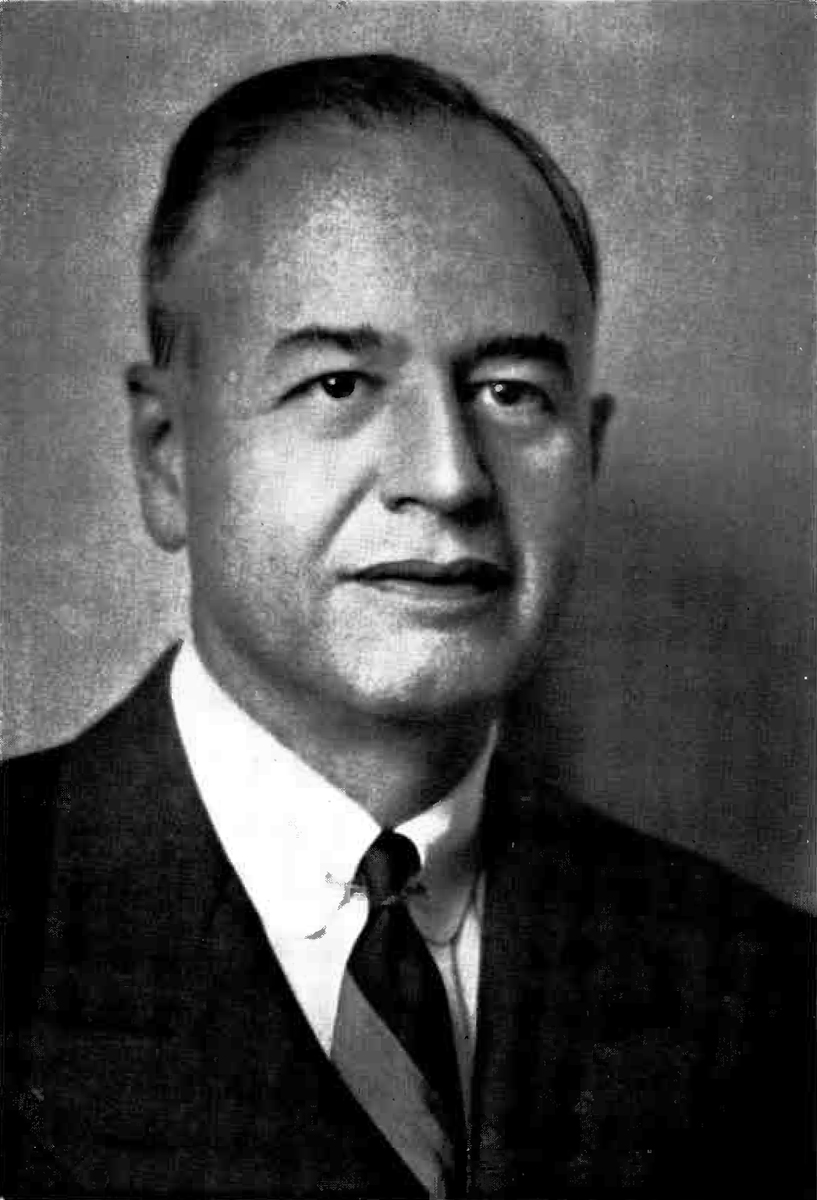
George B. Storer, founder and president of Storer Broadcasting.

Meanwhile, George B. Storer, the namesake of the WGBS stations, resumed efforts to wedge his way into the fight for VHF channel 10 after winning a favorable appeals court ruling knocking down the FCC's TV station ownership limits (which the Supreme Court of the United States would later overturn). In April 1955, he warned a federal appeals court, "If the grant on Channel 10 is finalized, operation on UHF in Miami will no longer remain feasible and Storer will be compelled to discontinue television operation in that city", as part of a plea to convert the Miami market to all-UHF operation. Mitchell Wolfson, who had built WTVJ, was "astounded" by the move, which he considered brazen. However, Storer's various appeals were for naught. Particularly of note for channel 23 was one that allowed the Biscayne Television Corporation to build WCKT (channel 7) in March 1956. WCKT would be the NBC affiliate when it signed on July 29, taking the programming that had been foundational to channel 23 in its short existence. Despite the changes, Storer moved channel 23's studios from Fort Lauderdale to a house Storer owned at NE 21st Street and Biscayne Boulevard.

In March 1957, WGBS-TV, limping on as an independent station, was approached by Public Service Television, the subsidiary of Miami-based National Airlines that had been awarded the construction permit for WPST-TV on VHF channel 10, to gauge Storer's interest in selling the station's equipment. On April 5, Storer announced it had agreed to sell land, tower, and studio facilities to Public Service Television for an undisclosed price (reported to be in excess of $500,000 by Broadcasting magazine) and that WGBS-TV would leave the air on April 13, with Public Service Television assuring employment for WGBS-TV's staff; the deal would also allow channel 10 to commence operation sooner than otherwise. In a press release, Storer noted that the UHF station had been unprofitable from the moment the company purchased it. The station left the air at 11:45 p.m. on April 13, 1957, nearly four years after going into operation in Fort Lauderdale in 1953. WPST-TV signed on August 2, 1957, and inaugurated new studios at the Biscayne Boulevard site included in the Storer purchase the next year.

== Channel 23 after WGBS-TV ==
The sale of WGBS-TV assets to the new channel 10 did not include the operating authority for channel 23, which Storer retained for another decade. In 1966, Storer announced it planned to reactivate the station. Storer cited the All-Channel Receiver Act, which ensured all new sets had UHF tuning capability; it was also noted that, in 1964, the company had repurchased the tower site last used by WGBS-TV after Public Service Television lost channel 10's license to L. B. Wilson in order to upgrade the FM facility. However, by March 1967, a Storer representative had stated there were no such plans in force.

In May 1967, Storer reached a deal with Coastal Broadcasting System, Inc., a company owned by IHOP founder Al Lapin, which would purchase the construction permit and to lease the tower site and building from Storer. Coastal returned channel 23 to operation after more than a decade as WAJA-TV on November 14, 1967.
