= NBC 12 =

NBC 12 may refer to one of the following television stations in the United States:

== Current affiliates ==
- KBMT-DT2, Beaumont/Port Arthur, Texas
- KOBR, Roswell, New Mexico
  - Satellite of KOB in Albuquerque
- KPNX, Phoenix, Arizona
- KTVH-DT, Helena, Montana
- WBOY, Clarksburg, West Virginia
- WICU-TV, Erie, Pennsylvania
- WJFW-TV, Rhinelander/Wausau, Wisconsin
- WSFA, Montgomery, Alabama
- WTLV, Jacksonville, Florida
- WWBT, Richmond, Virginia
- WXII, Winston-Salem, North Carolina

== Formerly affiliated ==
- KEYC-TV, Mankato, Minnesota (1960 to 1961)
- KCOY-TV, Santa Maria, California (1964 to 1969)
- KPTV, Portland, Oregon (1957 to 1959)
- KXII, Sherman, Texas (1956 to 1977)
- WVUE, Wilmington, Delaware (1949 to 1955)
