= New Program Group =

- Company type: Joint-venture consortium
- Founded: August 1984

The New Program Group (NPG) refers to a joint-venture consortium formed in August 1984 involving the Gannett, Hearst, Metromedia, Storer and Taft television station groups. The reasoning behind of the formation occurred when broadcasting companies Taft, Gannett, Hearst, and Storer, desiring to beat the rates of network production (by the early 1980s, an average network sitcom cost roughly $600,000 per episode) and exercise more creative program control, joined forces with Metromedia Productions to produce and distribute new first-run syndicated TV programs. The first program from NPG was Small Wonder, which debuted on 7 September 1985.
