= WAMR =

WAMR may refer to:

- WAMR-FM, a radio station (107.5 FM) licensed to Miami, Florida, United States
- Pitu Airport in Morotai, Maluku Islands, Indonesia
- WebAssembly Micro Runtime, a lightweight, standalone, interpreter-based WebAssembly runtime programmed in C
