= WRTO =

WRTO may refer to:

- WRTO-FM, a radio station (98.3 FM) licensed to Goulds, Florida, United States
- WRTO (AM), a radio station (1200 AM) licensed to Chicago, Illinois, United States
