= W Radio =

W Radio is the branding of several radio stations, including:

- W Radio México, see XEW-AM
- W Radio Los Angeles, see XEWW-AM
- W Radio (Colombia)
- Caracol Miami, see WSUA
