= WVUE =

WVUE may refer to:

- WVUE-DT in New Orleans, Louisiana
- WVUE (Delaware), a defunct television station in Wilmington, Delaware
