= 96X =

96X may refer to:

- CKRA-FM, a radio station (96.3 FM) licensed to Edmonton, Alberta, Canada branded as 96X from 2003 to 2005
- WMJX (Miami), a radio station (96.3 FM) licensed to Miami, Florida, United States that used the 96X branding from 1975 to 1981
- WROX-FM, a radio station (96.1 FM) licensed to Exmore, Virginia, United States branded as 96X since 1993
