= WAMR-FM =

Spanish-language adult contemporary radio station in Miami

- Miami, Florida; United States
- Broadcast area: South Florida
- Frequency: 107.5 MHz (HD Radio)
- Branding: Amor 107.5

Programming
- Language: Spanish
- Format: Adult contemporary
- Subchannels: HD2: Radio USA; HD3: Caribbean music

Ownership
- Owner: Uforia Audio Network; (Univision Radio Illinois, Inc.)
- Sister stations: WRTO-FM; WLTV-DT; WAMI-DT

History
- First air date: June 7, 1974
- Former call signs: WIGL (1974–1978); WJOK (1978–1979); WQBA-FM (1979–1995)
- Call sign meaning: Amor

Technical information
- Licensing authority: FCC
- Facility ID: 61658
- Class: C1
- ERP: 93,000 watts
- HAAT: 307 meters (1,007 ft)
- Transmitter coordinates: 25°58′2″N 80°12′34″W

Links
- Public license information: Public file; LMS
- Webcast: Listen live
- Website: amor1075fm.univision.com; oneloveradio.com (HD3)

WAMR-FM (107.5 MHz) is a commercial radio station in Miami, Florida. It airs a Spanish-language adult contemporary radio format aimed at Spanish-speaking adults. The station is owned by Uforia Audio Network with the license held by Univision Radio Illinois, Inc. The station also broadcasts on HD radio.

The transmitter is off NW 207th Street in Miami. The call sign WAMR refers to the Spanish word amor, which means "love".

== History ==
On June 7, 1974, the station first signed on as WIGL. It was the FM sister station to WWOK (1260 AM), both owned by the Mission East Company, and airing a country music format. The call sign was changed to WJOK on April 10, 1978. In March 1979, the station was acquired by Susquehanna Radio, which switched it to a Spanish-language top 40/dance format as WQBA-FM ("Super Q"), sister to WQBA (1140 AM). By the late 1980s, the station had shifted to a Spanish adult contemporary sound.

Previous logo

In 1995, the call letters were changed to WAMR-FM and the station began calling itself "Amor". At this point, the format was mostly romantic ballads by artists such as Julio Iglesias and Gloria Estefan. A similar format was launched one dial position away, on WRMA (106.7 FM) whose call letters stood for "Romantica". Both stations enjoyed much success with adult Spanish-speaking listeners in Miami.

In 2003, WAMR-FM was bought by Univision Radio. Univision's television headquarters was already based in Miami and the acquisition of several Spanish-language Miami radio stations helped the company move into radio ownership. By this time, the station had moved away from its soft ballad sound, playing more uptempo international and tropical hits but still aimed at an adult audience. WAMR-FM remains one of the Miami radio market's top rated stations.
