= WAMI-DT =

Television station in Hollywood, Florida

- Hollywood–Miami–Fort Lauderdale–; West Palm Beach, Florida; United States
- City: Hollywood, Florida
- Channels: Digital: 24 (UHF); Virtual: 69
- Branding: UniMás Miami

Programming
- Affiliations: 69.1: UniMás / Univision (alternate); for others, see § Subchannels

Ownership
- Owner: TelevisaUnivision; (UniMás Miami LLC)
- Sister stations: WLTV-DT, WAMR-FM, WRTO-FM

History
- First air date: August 10, 1988
- Former call signs: WYHS (1988–1992); WYHS-TV (1992–1998); WAMI-TV (1998–2009)
- Former channel numbers: Analog: 69 (UHF, 1988–2009); Digital: 47 (UHF, until 2018)
- Former affiliations: HSN (1988–1998); Independent (1998–2002); Fox Kids (secondary, 1997–2001)
- Call sign meaning: Miami

Technical information
- Licensing authority: FCC
- Facility ID: 60536
- ERP: 1,000 kW
- HAAT: 297 m (974 ft)
- Transmitter coordinates: 25°59′10″N 80°11′36.3″W

Links
- Public license information: Public file; LMS
- Website: UniMás

WAMI-DT (channel 69) is a television station licensed to Hollywood, Florida, United States, serving as the Miami-area outlet for the Spanish-language network UniMás. It is owned and operated by TelevisaUnivision alongside Univision station WLTV-DT (channel 23). The two stations share studios known as "NewsPort" (a 150,000-square-foot [13,900 m^{2}] converted studio facility that also houses N+ Univision) on Northwest 30th Terrace in Doral; WAMI-DT's transmitter is located in the Dale Village mobile home park in Pembroke Park, Florida.

WAMI is one of two commercial television stations with a city of license in Broward County, the other being Telemundo station WSCV (channel 51), licensed to Fort Lauderdale. The station also serves as the de facto UniMás outlet for the West Palm Beach market, as that area does not have a UniMás station of its own.

== History ==
Prior to being used by a full-power station, the channel 69 allocation was occupied by W69AA, a translator for WCIX (channel 6). The analog channel 6 transmitter was located in Homestead because of station spacing restrictions to channel 6 in Orlando; W69AA and two other translators, all commissioned in 1972, provided WCIX programming to areas in Broward County and Boca Raton. As applications proceeded on the full-power allotment, W69AA was displaced; it went silent and returned as W58BU, a translator of WTVJ, on March 10, 1994.

=== Early years ===
In 1981, four applications were received for a full-power television station on channel 69, from Whitco Broadcasters; Family Television 69, owned by Hialeah pastor Adib Eden Sr.; Golden East Broadcasters; and Christian Media of Florida. In April, the FCC selected Whitco over the other applicants, saying that Christian Media of Florida's three pastor owners would not be able to balance ministry and station operations; Whitco offered $111,000 to its competitors to end the proceeding.

Whitco, owned by Eddie Whitehead and Thomas Coates, proposed the first African-American-owned television station in South Florida, aimed at the same audience. The construction permit took the call letters WDEM and secured space on the new tower being built by Guy Gannett Communications in Pembroke Park.

An attempt to sell a majority stake in the construction permit to an investor group that sought to program channel 69 as a Spanish-language station fell through in early 1985. On February 19, 1987, the Home Shopping Network (HSN) announced that it was acquiring a majority stake in WDEM, with the option to buy the facility outright upon completion for $10 million.

WAMI first signed on the air on August 10, 1988, as WYHS-TV. Before the station launched, WYHS-TV simulcast audio from WHYI-FM (Y-100) with live telecasting views of Miami before signing on. When it signed on, WYHS-TV carried programming from the Home Shopping Network. Two months later, HSN's broadcasting division, Silver King Communications, acquired the remainder of the station. The primary purpose of these stations was to force carriage of HSN on cable providers in each market through the Federal Communications Commission's must-carry provisions as QVC was taking away a large slice of HSN's audience as several providers had held an ownership interest in QVC, but not HSN. Eventually, Silver King Communications acquired an ownership interest in the USA Network, and as a result, later became USA Broadcasting, the broadcast arm of media company USA Networks, Inc. In the fall of 1997, channel 69 began carrying Fox Kids programming, after it was dropped by the market's WB affiliate WDZL (channel 39, later WBZL and now WSFL-TV), which acquired the block in 1993 after Fox affiliate WSVN (channel 7) decided to stop carrying Fox's children's programming.

=== WAMI 69 ===
WAMI logo; originally showing "Miami", it was later modified to incorporate the channel number.

On June 8, 1998, at 6 a.m., channel 69 became an independent station; the station also changed its call letters to WAMI-TV. The relaunch of channel 69 was known as the "Birth of a Station", where a soon-to-be mother was giving birth to the "Miami" thought-bubble station logo (the entire day before, the channel stunted with the picture of a sonogram of the new logo as a lead into the introduction). Immediately after that sketch, real-time traffic and weather reports were shown. The revamped station adopted a general entertainment format with a strong focus on locally produced programs including a daily news program called The Times; the sports discussion show SportsTown; Generation ñ, a program targeted at bilingual, 2nd generation Latinos in the U.S.; the lifestyle programs Ocean Drive (which was based on the magazine of the same name) and Ten's (which was also broadcast on Dallas sister station KSTR-TV from 1999 to 2001); the dance program Barcode; an alternative lifestyle program called Kenneth's Frequency; and the talk show Out Loud, which was hosted by Bill Teck and produced by Miami producer and media personality Paul Bouche. The station's programming was mostly aimed at teenagers and young adults between the ages of 16 and 34. The format heavily took after the groundbreaking CITY-TV in Toronto, which carried a similar mix of syndicated shows and movies with locally produced programming.

WAMI repackaged the Fox Kids block, incorporating it into the live, locally produced interactive children's show WAMI on Miami. The hosts of that program would hold up a "WAMI" hand sign, holding up both hands, making "L" shapes, and crossing their hands together to form a "W", shouting; "Wami, baby!" to its on-air audience. Children would show up at WAMI-sponsored Fox Kids/Power Rangers events that were held throughout Miami-Dade and Broward counties, mimicking their favorite WAMI on Miami on-air host. Another pickup for the station was Politically Incorrect with Bill Maher, which had not been cleared by the area's ABC affiliate, WPLG.

The station soon began to heavily incorporate local remote interstitials that were broadcast live. WAMI-TV often shot its interstitials, "live" at remote locations all over Miami-Dade and Broward counties, with the WAMI interstitial host often literally pulling passers-by off the streets to read the cue cards announcing the programs that would be shown on the station during the next hour. Another short program not seen on most other USA-owned stations was the topical program Lips, featuring a pair of ruby red lips in front of a black background, teasing the day's stories or issues, a concept that was thought to be inspired by The Rocky Horror Picture Show.

WAMI-TV prominently used the on-air station "bug" or WAMI station ID logo, a variation of the WAMI "thought bubble"; the station ID graphic would flash on the lower part of the screen, at the top, and bottom of the hour, or each time a program returned from commercial break, and then fade out. WAMI's vice president of promotions ordered that the logo bug remain on-screen during its programs, around the clock, and to give it a translucent appearance so that it was seen constantly. WAMI also featured "WAMI-cams", which were three to five-second on-air spots that were used to fill airtime, usually catching a glimpse of South Beach street life, scenic views, or interesting goings-on in Miami, followed a "pop" sound and the appearance of the WAMI "thought bubble" graphic. The rest of WAMI-TV's programming schedule was supplemented with some first-run syndicated reality and talk shows, syndicated reruns of network sitcoms, movies (under the WAMI Movie Palace banner), cartoons and a few religious programs.

By December 1998, after only six months on the air, WAMI-TV had outbid UPN owned-and-operated station WBFS-TV (channel 33) and WB affiliate WBZL to land an exclusive six-year contract for the local television rights to Major League Baseball games from the Florida Marlins. WAMI had also procured the rights to broadcast Miami Heat NBA games prior to the station's relaunch.

By late 1999, WAMI had grown into its role as the "flagship station" of what was to become the USA Broadcasting Network, comprising thirteen stations scattered around the country in major U.S. cities, twelve of which were former HSN affiliates. All of these stations, which were owned by Barry Diller, were to gradually be converted to follow WAMI's format, called "CityVision". The "CityVision" concept was based on Diller's theory that local programming was being ignored on most broadcast stations, and that the general public wanted a sense of what is going on in their communities on television. A scaled-down version of the format was adopted by USA Broadcasting-owned sister stations KHSX-TV in Dallas (which became KSTR-TV and rebranded as "K-Star 49"), WHSH-TV in Boston (which became WHUB-TV and rebranded as "Hub 66"; it is now WUTF-TV) and WHOT-TV in Atlanta (which rebranded as "Hotlanta 34"; it is now WUVG-TV). The rest of the former HSN-affiliated stations owned by USA that were due to be converted were WHSE-TV (now WFUT-DT) and WHSI (now WFTY-DT) in the New York City market (whose calls were to be changed to WORX and rebranded as "The Works" upon the format change), WEHS (now WXFT-DT) in Chicago (which was to become WNDE and be rebranded as "Windy"), WQHS-TV in Cleveland, KHSC-TV (now KFTR-DT) in Los Angeles (whose calls were to be changed to KLIK and be rebranded as "Click"), WHSP (now WUVP-DT) in Philadelphia, WHSW (now WUTB) in Baltimore, KHSH (now KFTH-DT) in Houston and WBHS (now WFTT-DT) in Tampa.

=== Sale to Univision and switch to a Spanish-language format ===
Due to financial problems that USA Networks began facing in 2000, the company began looking to divest some of its assets. USA Broadcasting, as one of these assets, was considered for divestiture as part of a deal to help USA Networks repair its financial footing. In 2001, the remaining entertainment units of USA Broadcasting were sold to Vivendi Universal, along with $10.3 billion worth of shares held by Barry Diller. The television stations were to be sold to The Walt Disney Company, but Univision Communications outbid its competition in a close race. The sale was finalized on January 3, 2002.

On January 14, 2002, WAMI-TV became a charter owned-and-operated station of Univision's fledgling Spanish-language secondary network, Telefutura (which rebranded as UniMás eleven years later on February 7, 2013). WPXM-TV (channel 35) and West Palm Beach sister station WPXP-TV acquired the rights to the Marlins telecasts (which were now produced by Fox Sports), which aired through the Florida Marlins Television Network, eventually dropping them in 2005 after Pax TV relaunched as i: Independent Television (the rights to Marlins and Heat telecasts are held by Sun Sports, now Bally Sports Sun).

In late 2009, most Univision-owned television stations, including WAMI and sister station WLTV, upgraded their main digital signals to transmit programming in 1080i high definition. TeleFutura's sister network Univision became the last major over-the-air television network in the United States to begin offering high definition programming on December 31, 2009.

== Newscasts and local programming ==
Univision owned-and-operated sister station WLTV produces an hour-long weekday morning newscast for WAMI called Noticias 23 Al Amanecer en UniMás Miami, which airs Monday through Fridays at 7 a.m. and is an extension of WLTV's two-hour morning newscast. In addition, that station produces a public affairs program called Ahora en Nuestra Comunidad, which airs on Saturday mornings at 6 a.m. on WAMI-DT with a rebroadcast on WLTV at 11:30 a.m.

=== Awards and nominations ===
WAMI-TV during its 2 1/2 year run under USA Broadcasting ownership, received 18 Suncoast Regional Emmy Awards and 22 Promax Awards.

- 1998: 7 Regional Emmys
- 1999: 6 Regional Emmys, 10 Promax Awards
- 2000: 5 Regional Emmys, 10 Promax Awards
- 2001: 2 Promax Awards

=== Notable former on-air staff ===
- Mark Jones – SportsTown co-anchor
- Ben Mankiewicz – The Times news anchor
- John Mattes – The Times investigative reporter
- Daniel Tosh – Tens co-host
- Cenk Uygur – WAMI-TV legal/writer/producer of The Times

== Technical information ==
=== Subchannels ===
The station's digital signal is multiplexed:

Subchannels of WAMI-DT
Subchannel	Res.	Short name	Programming
69.1	720p	WAMI-DT	UniMás
69.2	480i	Confess	Confess
69.3	480i	getTV	Great (4:3)
69.5	480i	QUEST	Quest
6.4	480i	Oxygen	Oxygen (WTVJ)

Subchannel broadcast with MPEG-4 video
Broadcast on behalf of another station

=== Analog-to-digital conversion ===
WAMI ended programming on its analog signal, on UHF channel 69, On June 12, 2009, the official date on which full-power television stations in the United States transitioned from analog to digital broadcasts under federal mandate. The station's digital signal continued to broadcast on its pre-transition UHF channel 47, using virtual channel 69. Like all Univision-owned stations, it also retained the "-DT" suffix on their calls at the time of transition.
