= WAQI =

Spanish-language news/talk radio station in Miami

- Miami, Florida (Note: Originally licensed to Fort Lauderdale; moved to Miami in 1945.); United States
- Broadcast area: South Florida
- Frequency: 710 kHz
- Branding: Radio Mambí

Programming
- Language: Spanish
- Format: Oldies

Ownership
- Owner: Latino Media Network, LLC (sale pending to Newsmax Radio, LLC)
- Sister stations: WQBA

History
- First air date: December 3, 1939
- Former call signs: WFTL (1939–1945); WGBS (1945–1985)

Technical information
- Licensing authority: FCC
- Facility ID: 37254
- Class: B
- Power: 50,000 watts
- Transmitter coordinates: 25°46′6.2″N 80°29′8.8″W

Links
- Public license information: Public file; LMS
- Webcast: Listen live (via iHeartRadio)

WAQI (710 AM) is a commercial radio station licensed to Miami, Florida, United States, featuring a Spanish-language oldies format known as Radio Mambí. Owned by Latino Media Network and formerly operated by Uforia Audio Network, the radio division of TelevisaUnivision, under a transitional agreement, the station broadcasts with 50,000 watts and serves as South Florida's designated primary entry point for the Emergency Alert System, one of three in the state. The studios are located at Univision's Miami headquarters, and the transmitter is located at the intersection of U.S. 41 and Florida State Road 997, near the edge of the Everglades.

WFTL went on the air from Fort Lauderdale in 1939. The local station raised its profile by switching to its present frequency in 1943 and becoming the highest-power station in Florida at the time. It was acquired by George B. Storer in 1944, after a controversial acquisition that resulted in government scrutiny, and moved to Miami the next year. WGBS grew into a 50,000-watt station, and Storer became headquartered in Miami, starting first an FM station and an ill-fated TV station. It generally aired an adult music format after the 1950s. When Storer opted to exit radio at the end of 1978, Jefferson-Pilot Communications purchased its Miami radio properties, converting the low-rated WGBS to a talk format in February 1983.

In 1985, Jefferson-Pilot sold WGBS to buy WNWS (790 AM), then its direct competitor, merging the two stations' programming on the 790 frequency that had a better signal into Broward County. The 710 facility, with its strong signal into Cuba, was then spun off to Cuban-American businessman Amancio Suárez, resulting in the foundation of WAQI Radio Mambí. Known for its hardline anticommunist stance from the start, Mambí has ranked among the most popular Spanish-language stations in South Florida and is also jammed by the Cuban government; however, it was criticized for disseminating disinformation, particularly by groups on the left. Sales of Radio Mambí in 1995 and 2022 attracted attention in political circles. The station ceased regular programming on December 12, 2025.

== WFTL in Fort Lauderdale ==
On January 10, 1939, Tom M. Bryan filed for a construction permit to build a new local radio station to serve Fort Lauderdale on the frequency of 1370 kHz, with 250 watts during the day and 100 at night. The Federal Communications Commission (FCC) granted Bryan the permit on July 12, 1939, and on December 3, 1939, WFTL made its first broadcasts from studios and a transmitter site on Andrews Avenue. Bryan had brought other pioneering local businesses to Lauderdale prior to building WFTL; these included the city's first ice plant and telephone company. The station upgraded nighttime power to 250 watts in 1940 and moved to 1400 kHz in 1941 with the frequency changes of NARBA.

In February 1941, Bryan filed to sell WFTL to Ralph A. Horton. While there was concern that the association of Horton with a local newspaper, the morning Fort Lauderdale Times, could block the sale, the FCC approved on July 1. Within months of Horton acquiring WFTL, the station joined the Mutual Broadcasting System, becoming the closest Mutual station to Miami, and in October, Horton filed to move to 710 kHz and increase power to 10,000 watts from a new transmitter site west of the city, which the FCC approved on January 6, 1942. At the time, one Miami station (WIOD) broadcast with 5,000 watts, and a second, WQAM, was slated to join it. Materials restrictions associated with the outbreak of World War II slowed work, but by late 1942, the building expansion had been completed, as had the necessary three-tower array. Not only was the station increasing its power to become the largest in Florida, it announced it would set up Miami studios in the Mayfair Theater, quarters originally used by the Miami Conservatory of Music.

The upgrade and new frequency took effect on February 24, 1943, bringing a full-power Mutual signal to Miami.

== WGBS ==
=== Storer purchase and move to Miami ===
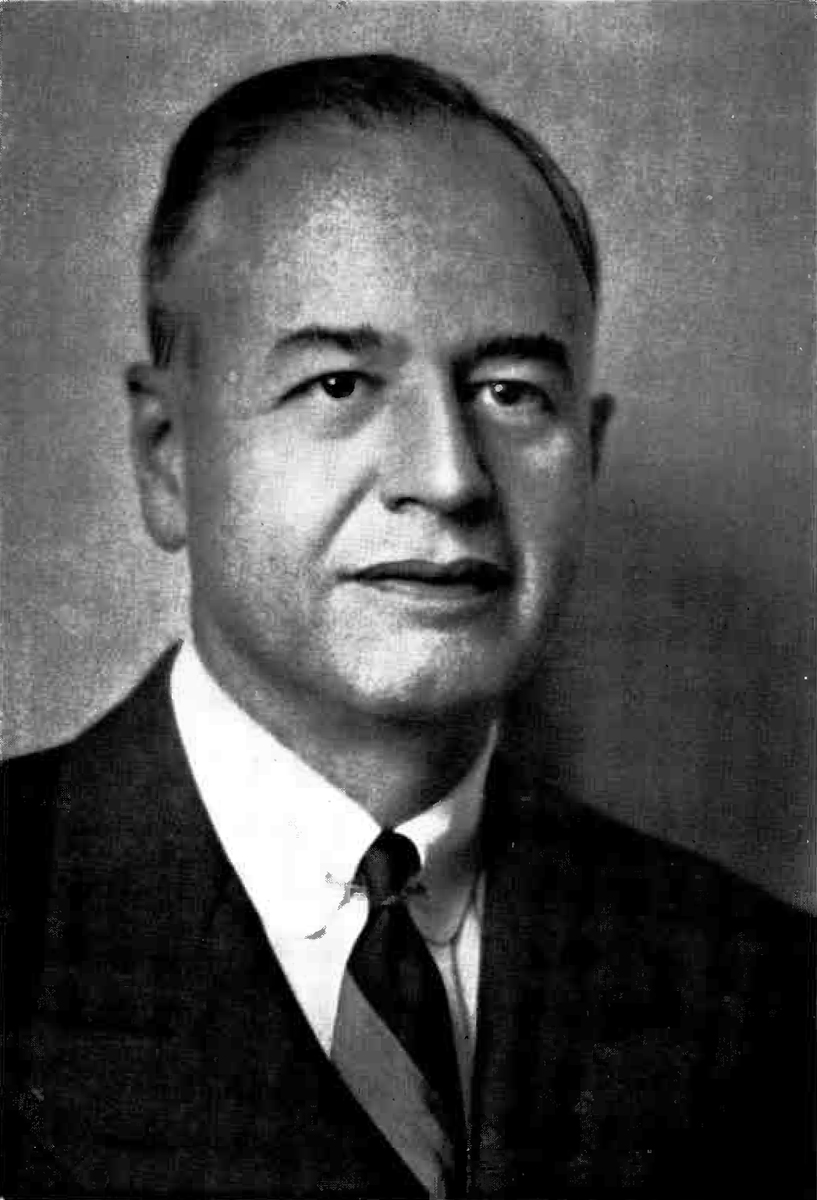
George B. Storer

Two months after activating the 10,000-watt facility and new Miami studios, Horton—later citing his lack of knowledge of the radio business—announced he would sell WFTL to the Fort Industry Company, led by George B. Storer, for $275,000; Storer would move the station on a full-time basis to Miami, where he owned a home in Surfside. The FCC slated the transaction for hearing, during which time it was revealed that Fort Industry was keeping the station afloat while the transaction was pending.

The FCC approved the sale on February 29, 1944, and work began to move the station's operations to Miami on a full-time basis. However, several legal concerns and even questions before a House committee investigating the FCC were raised over two issues: the fact that the same attorney, Andrew Bennett, worked for both Horton and Storer, and allegations that FCC chairman James Lawrence Fly had accepted a $17.30 gratuity from Storer to pay for a stay at an Atlanta hotel. Fly denied having any influence with regard to the sale of WFTL. John Sirica, serving as counsel to the House committee, declared that there had been a conspiracy by Fly, Storer, Bennett and others to obtain WFTL. An editorial in the Fort Lauderdale Daily News pointed out Horton's admitted lack of expertise, quipping that "he didn't know a kilocycle from a station-break and he admitted it" and noting that Horton had entered into a refinancing contract that was an unauthorized transfer of control. A final statement from the committee, released at the start of 1945, chided Fly for "putting the heat on" to pressure Horton to sell, declared Bennett's actions to be a "double-crossing" of Horton, and found the sale price "entirely too low" in view of WFTL's business prospects.

In December 1944, WFTL announced it would leave Mutual on June 15, 1945, to join the Blue Network, replacing WKAT (1360 AM). Prior to the change in network affiliation, the station dropped the WFTL call sign and took Storer's initials as its own, becoming WGBS on April 16. WGBS and WQAM exchanged network affiliations in 1947, with WGBS picking up the CBS affiliation, as part of a group deal that also gave affiliation to Fort Industry's WWVA in Wheeling, West Virginia, and WAGA in Atlanta. The FCC approved a daytime power increase to 50,000 watts in 1947, and work was completed in January 1949, making WGBS the first 50,000-watt station in Florida. In 1952, the Fort Industry Company, named prior to owning radio and television properties, changed its name to Storer Broadcasting Company.

=== Expansion into FM and TV ===
In 1948, an FM radio station, WGBS-FM, was launched primarily to simulcast WGBS's AM transmission. However, by 1957, it was operating just six hours a day, six days a week.

Storer had been attempting to enter Miami television, but ownership limit complications complicated its path until Storer was able to buy a UHF television station, WFTL-TV (channel 23), in 1954, the same year it moved its corporate offices to Miami Beach. (Note: This was co-owned with WFTL (1400 AM), which went on the air in 1946 and revived the designation in Fort Lauderdale.) Like with WFTL radio a decade before, Storer moved the station to Miami as WGBS-TV. After losing the NBC affiliation to new VHF station WCKT (channel 7) in 1956, WGBS-TV continued for a year as an independent before shutting down on April 13, 1957, and selling its studio facility and other assets to Public Service Television, which was preparing to put WPST-TV (channel 10) on the air. Storer declared it to have never been profitable.

=== WGBS in the 1960s and '70s ===
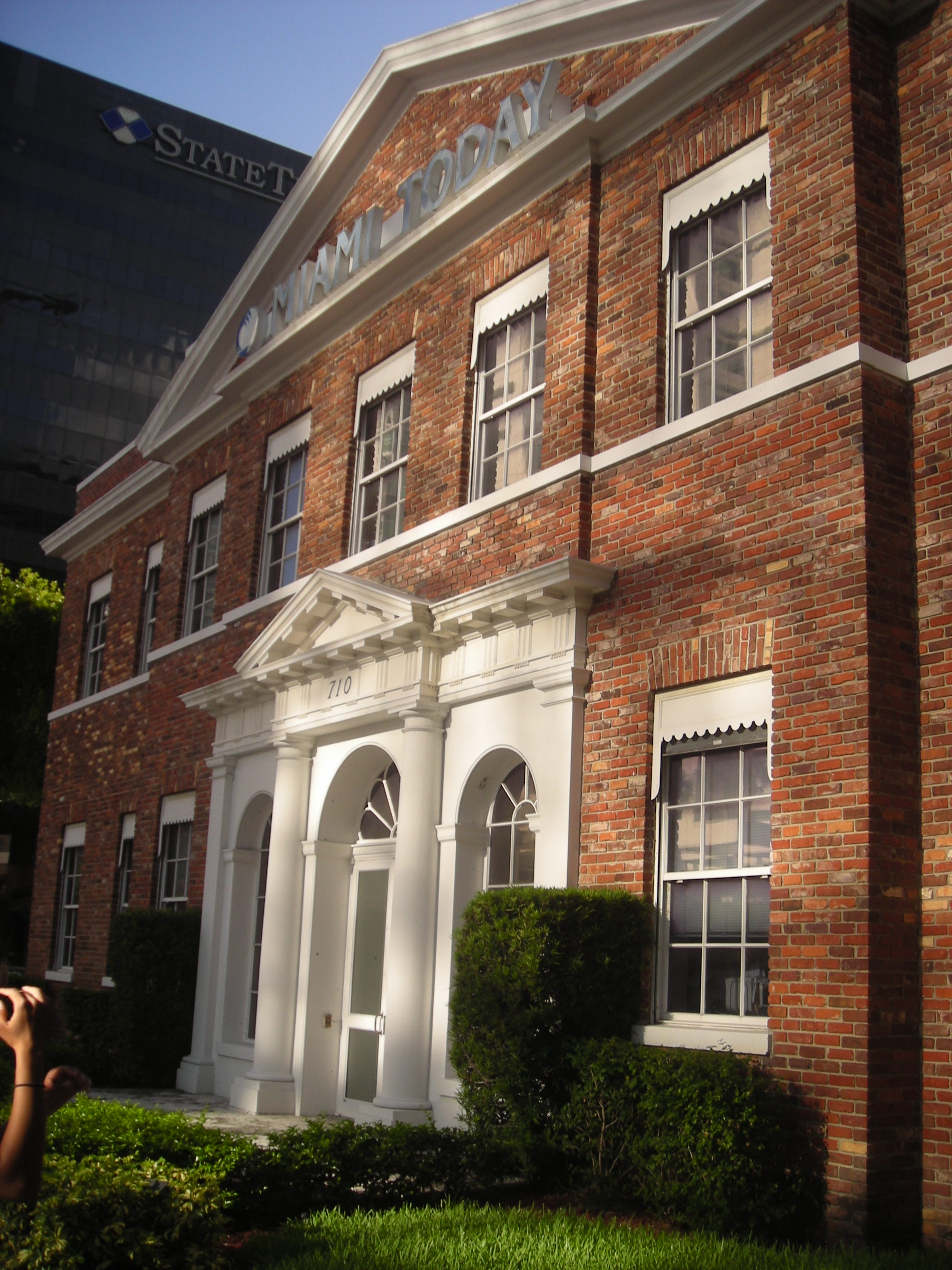
710 Brickell Avenue, built by Storer for WGBS in 1965

CBS Radio's elimination of the bulk of its entertainment programming on November 28, 1960, spurred WGBS to disaffiliate from the network and become an independent. Likewise, WGBS adopted a format of beautiful music/middle of the road format similar to one successfully implemented by co-owned WJW in Cleveland, Ohio, earlier in the year. To assist the 10-person news department, WGBS established or arranged for international news bureaus throughout Europe and Asia, along with bureaus in the U.S. In October 1962, during the Cuban Missile Crisis, WGBS's high power became of utility to the federal government. It requisitioned airtime on WGBS, WCKR (the former WIOD), and WMIE for three weeks to broadcast Spanish-language Voice of America output to Cuba at night; during this time, normal WGBS programs were heard only on FM. In November, this was relaxed after VOA built its own station at Marathon, though WGBS still continued to air three hours a day of VOA output at night.

In 1964, Storer made a $1 million investment in WGBS. It built a new transmitter site in South Broward, allowing it to raise its nighttime power to 50,000 watts, and a new, colonial-style office building was constructed at 710 Brickell Avenue, leaving the Mayfair after 20 years. The 10,000-square-foot (930 m^{2}) building opened in December 1965; Storer commissioned a custom song, "Make Ours Miami", to mark the occasion, and local governments declared "WGBS Week" in Miami. Arnie Warren, formerly of WKAT, joined WGBS in 1966 and would serve as its morning show host for 13 years. By this time, the station was cemented as an adult contemporary outlet. WGBS-FM also saw an upgrade: Storer repurchased the former WGBS-TV transmission tower from Public Service Television (whose license for WPST-TV had been revoked by the FCC) to help enable a power upgrade to 100,000 watts. The station broadcast the Miami Floridians of the American Basketball Association for three of their four seasons of existence, taking over from WOCN (1450 AM) in 1969.

Storer renamed WGBS-FM as WJHR, in honor of Storer Broadcasting co-founder J. Harold Ryan, in 1969, then sold off both it and their Detroit FM outlet in 1970 to Bartell Broadcasters. Storer would return to FM by buying WLYF (101.5 FM) from Sudbrink Communications for $5.56 million in early 1978.

=== Jefferson-Pilot ownership ===
Storer opted to exit radio entirely in late 1978 and began to find buyers for its radio properties, using the profits to invest further in cable TV systems. Storer asked $14 million for its Miami radio operation, but WGBS and WLYF-FM were ultimately sold for $12.5 million to Jefferson-Pilot Communications in February 1979; the FCC approved of the transaction that December. The stations moved in 1982 to studios in North Dade, allowing Jefferson-Pilot to sell the Brickell studios to Northern Trust Bank of Florida in what marked a record for a property sale on that major thoroughfare. (The building, last used by the Miami Today newspaper, was demolished in 2013.)

Ratings for the adult contemporary format declined during Jefferson-Pilot ownership as music listening continued to shift to FM, and WGBS was the last station to broadcast such a format on the AM dial. In February 1983, WGBS switched to a news/talk format, with hosts including David Gold and Mike Siegel. However, ratings were low throughout the run as three other stations battled with WGBS in that format, and by mid-1984, it was attracting ratings comparable to its prior adult contemporary sound with higher programming costs, though it was making a profit.

== WAQI ==
=== Sale to Suárez ===
We are not objective. We have an objective—to free Cuba.

— Héctor Durán, WAQI commentator at the station's launch in 1985

In July 1985, Jefferson-Pilot announced it would purchase one of the direct competitors to WGBS, WNWS (790 AM), with its superior signal in Broward County and stronger ratings. The stations worked toward a merger in November, in which four WNWS hosts and two WGBS hosts headed the new WNWS talk lineup.

Because at the time no company could own multiple AM stations in the same area, the WGBS facility and license—though not the studios—was sold to the Mambisa Broadcasting Corporation for $3.5 million. Mambisa was headed by Amancio Víctor Suárez, a 49-year-old self-made millionaire with no broadcast experience, and named for the mambises, Cuban independence fighters of the 19th century. Suárez had arrived in Florida penniless as a 19-year-old, with interests in home construction and the manufacture of watches and telephone answering machines.

Even before full FCC approval of the underlying transfers, the merger of WGBS into WNWS became effective at noon on October 23, 1985, when WGBS became WAQI. Temporary studios on SW 67th Avenue were used to start Radio Mambí while permanent facilities on Coral Way were built. Much like its direct format competitors—WQBA (1180 AM), WOCN (1450 AM) "Unión Radio", and WRHC (1550 AM)—Radio Mambí provided primarily news and talk programming alongside soap operas and music. Unión Radio was raided heavily by the new WAQI and lost several popular personalities to the startup.

Whereas the 790 facility more efficiently reached English-speaking listeners in Broward County, the 710 facility was one of the best Miami signals into Cuba. Four days after the changeover to Radio Mambí, transmissions started for Radio Rebelde, one of Cuba's national radio stations, on transmitters on 710 kHz, as Radio Mambí entered what general manager Armando Pérez Roura called "a radio war with Castro" designed to block its anti-government programs from being heard in Cuba. One transmitter at Santa Clara aired Rebelde, and another at Havana was noted as emitting a "high-frequency jamming buzz". Pérez Roura noted that the main interference generated was not within Cuba, where station officials claimed to have a large audience, but in Florida, where high-power Radio Rebelde and WQBA signals clashed. When WAQI was audible in Cuba, it offered an opposition viewpoint that reestablished contact between Cuban exiles and Cuba itself.

Radio Mambí rapidly became a popular station with the heavily Cuban Spanish-speaking audience in Miami by becoming the station of Cuba's exile community. It was close to the families of political prisoners and organized opposition movements while offering community service and cultural programming. Suárez expanded into television with HBC, which produced the fledgling Telemundo network's first nightly newscast in January 1987 from Miami, and, through another company, he bought FM station WTHM (98.3) in 1987 to relaunch it as WRTO-FM "Ritmo 98", the second full-time Spanish-language FM station in the city.

In 1992, Radio Martí began to purchase an hour of airtime each night on WAQI and WQBA to broadcast programming to Cuba, utilizing a clause in the 1983 law that created Radio Martí permitting broadcasts over commercial stations if jamming had increased by 25 percent or more since that time. By 2007, Radio Mambí was being paid $182,500 every six months to broadcast the Radio Martí program.

=== Heftel and Univision ownership ===
In 1989, Suárez announced an alliance with Heftel Broadcasting, a Las Vegas-based broadcaster specializing in Spanish-language stations and former owner of Miami's WHYI-FM, that included the national expansion of Mi Casa (My House), a magazine acquired the year before. Six years later, after a decade of successful ownership, Suárez announced he would sell the remaining 51 percent of Mambisa to Heftel, which by that time also owned WQBA. That sale attracted the attention of groups that promoted a more conciliatory stance to Cuba, as they feared that common ownership of WQBA and WAQI would leave them with no station that aired their views; they had also protested to no avail when Heftel purchased WQBA the year before. The deal was amended during consideration by the FCC to remove clauses that gave Suárez a stake in Heftel and a management contract before being approved and consummated in September. Heftel eventually reduced the overlap between the two stations by adding programming to WQBA that targeted Central and South American migrants.

In 2000, a comment made on a Radio Mambí program resulted in a brawl. Republican politicians Renier Díaz de la Portilla and Carlos Lacasa engaged in an early-morning fistfight in the station's parking lot after Lacasa's father insulted Díaz de la Portilla's father on the station's air. Lacasa received a bloody nose, and when host Martha Flores asked on the air for someone to call the police, the city's 911 system was swamped with calls. That year saw Radio Mambí set its all-time ratings record and rate number-one in the Miami radio market.

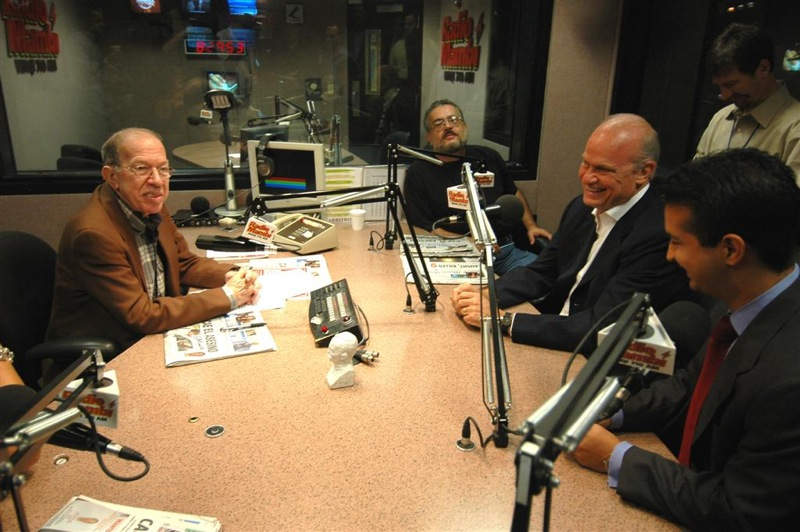
Fred Thompson in the Radio Mambí studio in 2007

In 2002, Heftel, renamed Hispanic Broadcasting Corporation, announced it would merge with Univision, a deal approved by the FCC the next year.

Many of the hosts on Mambí became institutions in local radio and in the Cuban exile community. Flores died at the age of 92 in 2020, having spent six decades on South Florida airwaves since arriving in Miami in 1959. That same year, Pérez Roura, who later moved to WWFE (670 AM), died at the same age; Ninoska Pérez Castellón, who worked with him at Mambí, recalled how he introduced his show by reading a list of people executed in Cuba on that date in past years.

On October 30, 2014, WAQI was granted a construction permit to move to the WQBA transmitter site and decrease night power to 6,300 watts. This move enabled Univision to sell the 117.7-acre (47.6 ha) former WAQI transmitter site in Miramar in early 2020 for $39 million for redevelopment as 385 single-family homes.

=== Latino Media Network sale ===
On June 3, 2022, Univision announced it would sell a package of 18 radio stations across 10 of its markets, primarily AM outlets in large cities (including WAQI and WQBA) and entire clusters in smaller markets such as McAllen, Texas, and Fresno, California, for $60 million to a new company known as Latino Media Network (LMN); Univision proposed to handle operations for a year under agreement before turning over operational control to LMN in the fourth quarter of 2023.

The deal was immediately interpreted in a political context. Latino Media Network is headed by Stephanie Valencia, who headed Latino outreach for Barack Obama, and Jess Morales Rocketto, a Democratic activist, with investors and advisors including Eva Longoria, former Florida Republican Party chair Al Cárdenas, longtime television anchor María Elena Salinas, and former Miami-Dade College president Eduardo J. Padrón. Much of its funding comes from Lakestar Capital, associated with businessman and philanthropist George Soros. Other Democratic groups had noted the prevalence of disinformation and antisemitism and the promotion of conspiracy theories, including the Great Replacement, on its air. This was particularly well received by older listeners, loyal to stations like WAQI. A 2021 report by media watchdogs, which focused on programs on Radio Mambí and WURN "Actualidad Radio" during one week in March 2021, cited practices such as hosts not correcting callers' incorrect statements, as well as recitations of false claims as news using sources such as Newsmax and The Daily Caller. A former Univision executive told Graciela Mochkofsky of The New Yorker that Mambí's content was often "indefensible".

Conservative political actors immediately feared that the change in ownership would lead to programming changes, particularly at Radio Mambí, that would marginalize their point of view. The head of Mothers Against Repression, Sylvia Iriondo, announced at a press conference held by the Assembly of the Cuban Resistance, "We have grounds to be extremely concerned [...] We will resist any attempt to censor the voices of this community represented by these radio stations with all legal and legitimate means". Other speakers included Florida lieutenant governor Jeanette Núñez, who recalled growing up listening to Radio Mambí in the car. Six Republican lawmakers, five of them from the Florida delegation—senators Marco Rubio and Rick Scott, representatives Carlos A. Giménez, María Elvira Salazar, and Mario Díaz-Balart, as well as senator Tom Cotton of Arkansas—wrote a letter to FCC chairwoman Jessica Rosenworcel urging her agency to "thoroughly scrutinize" the transaction when filed and casting it as a "desperate" move by Democratic operatives, noting their concern over a proposed sale of WSUA (1260 AM) to ATV Holdings, which had fallen apart earlier that year. The re-election campaign of Republican governor Ron DeSantis bought advertising time on WAQI and WQBA, airing 60-second commercials warning voters, "The left is taking control of our local media" and "they are coming with their ideological agenda", mentioning Soros "and his minions". In an op-ed in the Miami Herald, Valencia and Morales Rocketto wrote of their commitment to free speech and free markets, noting that they "do not intend to change the spirit or character of what has made it popular and profitable". However, several hosts departed the station, including Dania Alexandrino, Lourdes Ubieta, and Nelson Rubio, to found a new company known as Americano Media, which promised to start the "first Spanish-language conservative talk radio network"; Ubieta claimed that Univision offered them and other presenters a bonus worth thousands of dollars in exchange for staying and signing a confidentiality agreement, which Pérez Castellón, who stayed, denied.

The FCC approved the Latino Media Network sale in November 2022, and the purchase with respect to all stations except WADO in New York City was consummated on December 30, 2022. Under the terms of the deal, Univision continued to provide programming for up to a year in each market. LMN's attempt to recast WQBA as a more moderate station failed; despite possible signs of an improvement, LMN ran out of money to support marketing of that station and dropped its format in July 2025. Observers who once hoped that new ownership would improve the accuracy of WAQI's programming felt little had changed about Radio Mambí by 2025, expressing complaints about conservative employees continuing to push a more hardline stance and a lack of social media presence that diminished the station's influence.

Journalist Wilfredo Cancio Isla reported that Radio Mambí would cease operations on December 12, 2025, as part of the sale of WAQI and WQBA to potential new owners who requested the stations wind up broadcasting activities. About 20 employees were to be laid off. Management attributed the closure to changing economic realities in the radio industry. Archive programming and Heat and Marlins broadcasts continued to air on WAQI.

LMN agreed in November 2026 to sell WAQI and WQBA to Newsmax Radio, LLC, marking the conservative media company's first foray into broadcast station ownership. Newsmax paid $1.26 million for WAQI.
