= Storer Communications =

American radio and television broadcaster

Storer Communications, known from 1927 to 1952 as the Fort Industry Company and from 1952 to 1983 as Storer Broadcasting, was an American media company that owned television and radio stations and cable television systems.

Founded by George B. Storer and J. Harold Ryan as the Fort Industry Oil Company in Toledo, Ohio, the company's focus quickly shifted to radio ownership, particularly in Ohio, Michigan and West Virginia. Fort Industry added television stations to their portfolio, adopted the Storer name in 1952, and eventually owned multiple key affiliates of the CBS television network. Storer also acquired a reputation for selling smaller stations in order to purchase larger ones, particularly after the company reached then-existent ownership limits. The company also owned Northeast Airlines from 1965 to 1972, and the Boston Bruins from 1973 to 1975. A reorientation towards cable television led Storer to divest their radio holdings between 1979 and 1981. While this expansion led to Storer becoming the fourth-largest cable operator in the country, the systems built were expensive and unprofitable in the short-term, and the company suffered substantial losses in the mid-1980s.

In April 1985, a group of activist investors attempted to take over Storer's board of directors and initiate a liquidation. To thwart this, the company agreed to be taken private by Kohlberg Kravis Roberts (KKR) in a leveraged buyout valued at $1.6 billion. Storer was dismantled in the following years under KKR: the cable division was spun off and gradually dissolved into both TCI and Comcast, while the television stations were sold to George N. Gillett Jr. in 1987 and folded into New World Communications in 1993.

== History ==
=== Origins ===
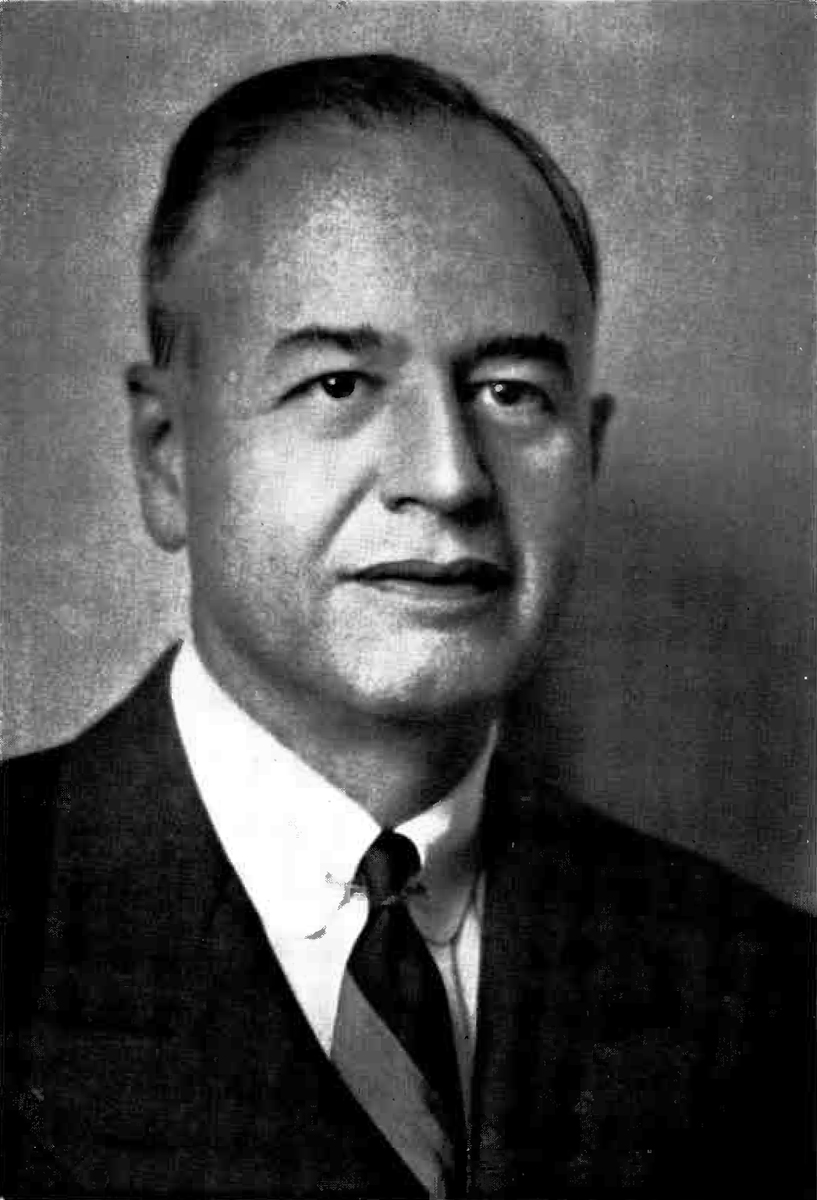
George B. Storer

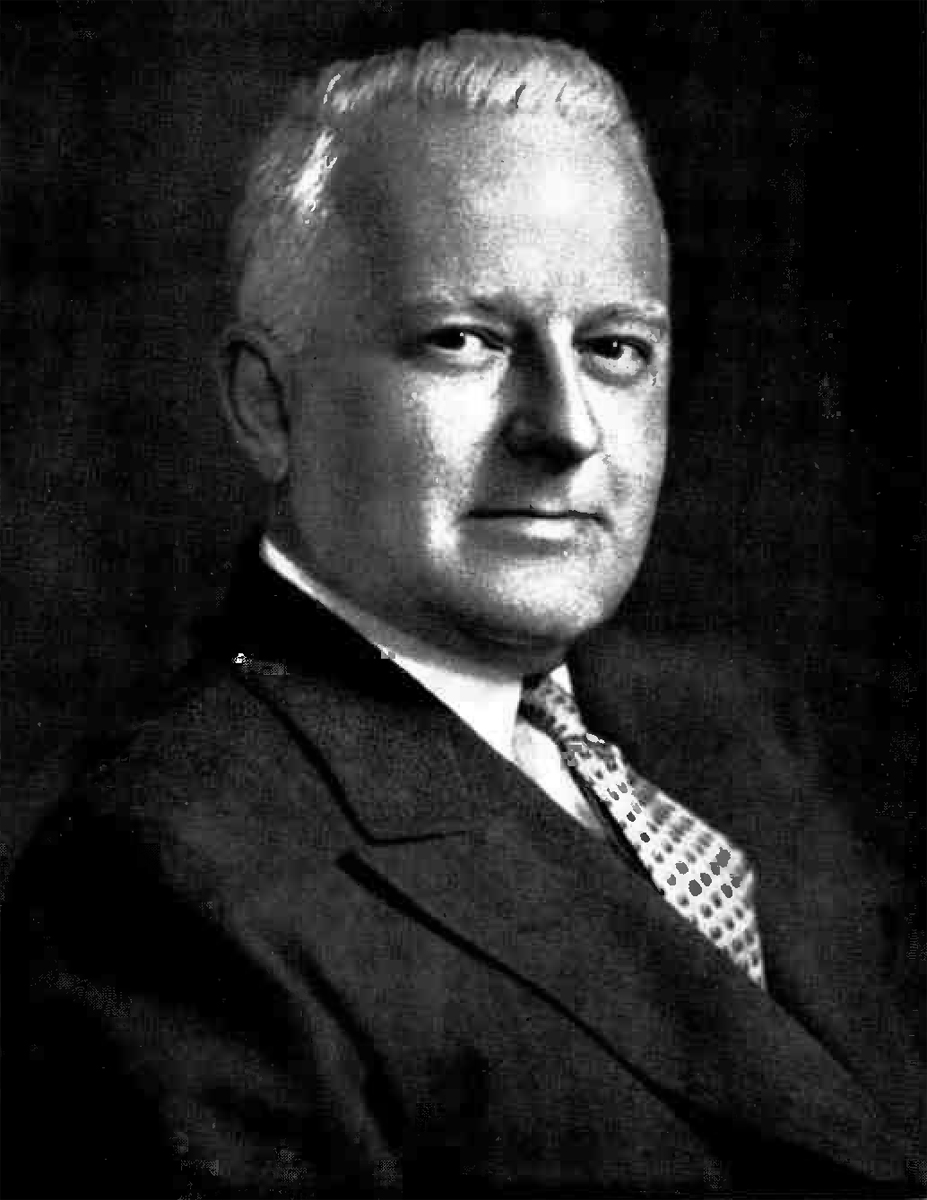
J. Harold Ryan

George Butler Storer was born on November 10, 1899, in Toledo, Ohio. His interest in radio dated back to 1912, when—inspired by the sinking of the Titanic that increased awareness of wireless radio—he listened to activity over a ham radio and experimented with a transmitter, both home-built. Originally planning to attend Yale University for engineering, the outbreak of World War I prompted Storer to travel to Canada at age 17 and register with the Royal Canadian Air Force; having one deaf ear, Storer instead registered with the Student Army Training Corps and was assigned to Cornell University.

Following the war, Storer studied journalism at Cornell and was editor of the student newspaper, The Cornell Daily Sun; he took over the family's Standard Steel Tube in Toledo in 1920 after the death of his father. Standard Steel Tube merged into the Elyria Iron and Steel Company in 1925, with Storer as vice-president of manufacturing; it became part of Republic Steel, where Storer became vice president. Between 1925 and 1928, Storer and brother-in-law John Harold Ryan built thirteen service stations for Speedene brand gasoline in the Toledo and Cleveland areas. Unlike most service stations in operation, these were built next to railroad siding and had large adjacent fuel tanks filled directly from tank cars, an idea that Storer thought of when looking outside the window of his Toledo office. This move bypassed the cost of trucking gasoline and the resulting savings were passed down to the customer. In 1927, Storer and Ryan founded the Fort Industry Oil Company to manage these stations, so named for an 1790s Army fort of unknown location reckoned to be where downtown Toledo sits today.

Storer decided to buy advertising on Toledo radio station WTAL for the service stations, which were shut out of newspaper advertising by the influential petroleum industry. Learning about WTAL's existing financial issues, Storer decided to buy the station for $3,500, thinking it would be more cost-effective than merely advertising. WTAL was renamed WSPD on February 20, 1928, derived from Speedene, and became the eighth affiliate for the Columbia Broadcasting System (CBS). WSPD's studios were moved to the Hotel Commodore Perry, which also housed the corporate offices for Fort Industry. Storer took an executive role with Detroit–based American Metal Products in 1928, which contracted with Ford Motor Company, and within a year turned a $650,000 profit; renamed Standard Tube, Storer oversaw this company and Ryan oversaw Fort Industry.

Detroit CBS affiliate WGHP was purchased in 1928 at the recommendation of network executive J. Andrew White. Acting on advice given to Storer by his physician, Fort Industry sold the station in 1930 to theater owners John H. Kunsky and George W. Trendle, who relaunched it as WXYZ. The Wall Street crash of 1929, coupled with price wars at the Speedene gas stations due to stiffened competition, resulted in radio becoming a standout for Fort Industry.

=== Focusing on radio ===
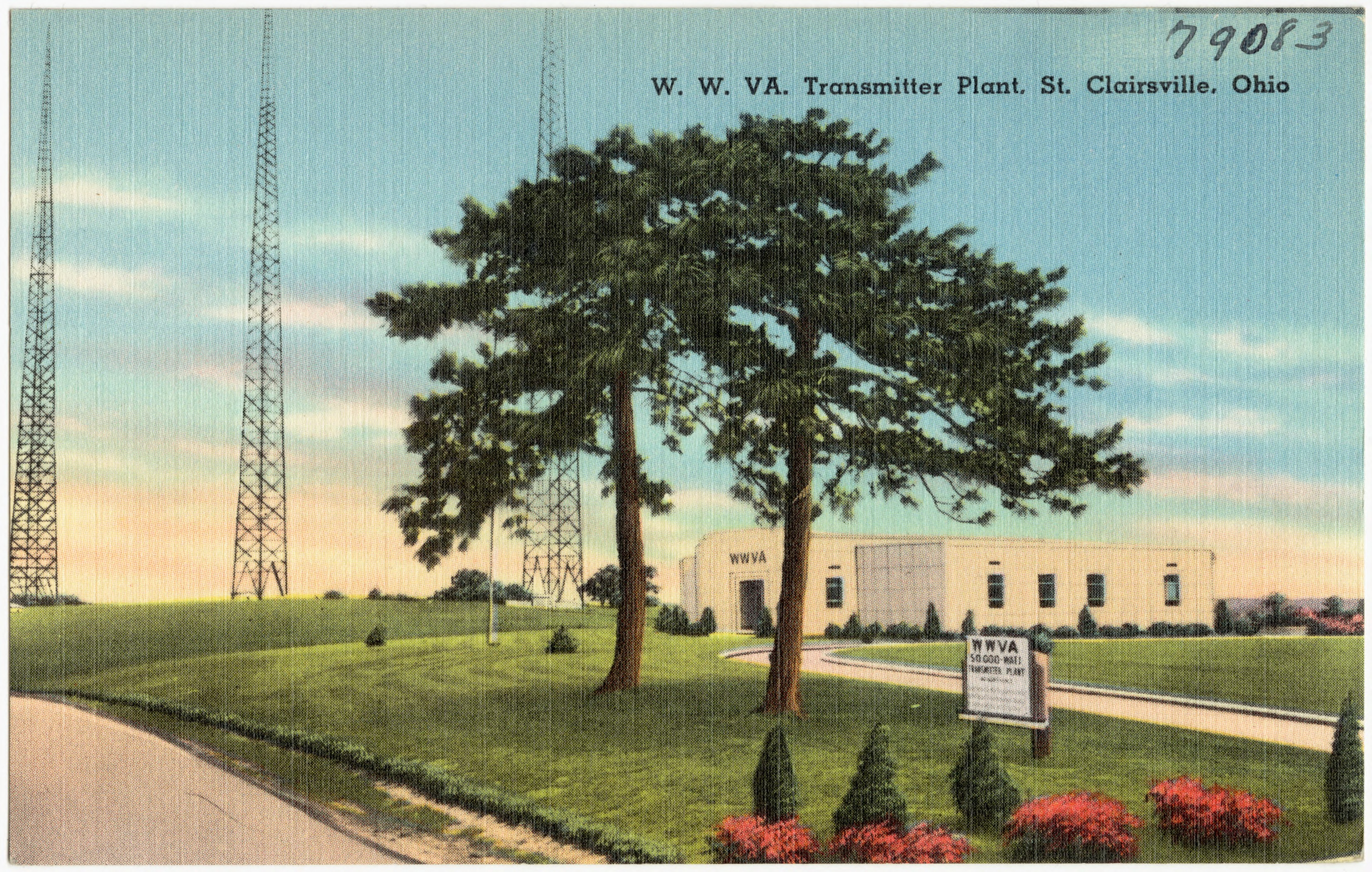
WWVA transmitter site in St. Clairsville, Ohio, c. 1941. The station upgraded to broadcast at 50,000 watts under Fort Industry/Storer ownership.

Recognizing the newfound enthusiasm in broadcasting, Fort Industry sold its oil interests in May 1931 to Standard Oil of Ohio, deleting "oil" from the company name. That same year, Fort Industry bought WWVA in Wheeling, West Virginia: referred by Storer as "our one-station network", WWVA joined CBS and became renowned for the Wheeling Jamboree. By 1941, WWVA was upgraded to 50,000 watts. Storer and Ryan were involved with the June 1932 establishment of Windsor, Ontario, station CKOK, serving at the CBS affiliate for both it and Detroit, but Canadian Radio League chairman Graham Spry protested CKOK's license renewal and requested an inquiry into the station's foreign ownership. CKOK was consolidated with London, Ontario, station CJGC in April 1933 to form CKLW, without Storer and Ryan's direct involvement. Storer retained a minority stake in CKLW until selling it in 1936 under pressure from Canadian regulators; by then, Fort Industry had also become a nominal investor in Seattle station KIRO. WMMN in Fairmont, West Virginia, was acquired in 1935 and also became a CBS affiliate. WBLY in Lima, Ohio, was purchased in 1937 and renamed WLOK in 1939; the "OK" was derived from the former CKOK calls.

Storer was involved in the operations of the American Broadcasting System, one of several attempts in the early 1930s for a third commercial radio network to compete against CBS and the "Red" and "Blue" networks of NBC. Launched in October 1934, WMCA in New York City (which Storer himself operated for 18 months beginning in 1933) was the initial flagship of a chain of twenty-four stations largely concentrated on the East Coast. After Storer and WMCA failed to reach a long-term arrangement, WNEW became the new flagship and the network was reorganized as the American Broadcasting Company, (Note: Not to be confused with the American Broadcasting Company, which was created from the former NBC Blue Network.) with Arde Bulova as an investor. Despite well-received programming and news coverage, this network lost considerable sums of money heightened by the Great Depression, dropped all but ten affiliates on March 5, 1935, and ceased operations entirely by March 26.

Fort Industry became part of a complicated 1934 relocation request for WALR in Zanesville, Ohio, to Toledo. While the proposal had the new Toledo station running under nominally separate ownership, Fort Industry was revealed to be a stockholder and it was thought they could exercise control over the station. Denied the request in 1937, Fort Industry became a majority investor in WALR through West Virginia Broadcasting—the licensee for WWVA and WMMN—and renamed it WHIZ in 1939, concurrent with the station joining NBC Radio.

After the United States entered World War II in December 1941, Ryan took a leave of absence as Fort Industry's vice president/general manager to serve as the Office of Censorship radio censor under Byron Price; Storer's Standard Tube plant was also converted to manufacture shell casings. Storer was appointed assistant chairman for the Broadcasters Victory Council, then joined the United States Navy in 1943 as a lieutenant commander, first in Chicago as a procurement officer and then stationed both at the West Coast and in Washington, D.C.

Atlanta radio station WAGA was purchased in April 1940 through an all-stock transaction; Storer intended to establish a secondary residence in the city. WFTL, licensed to Fort Lauderdale, Florida, was acquired in 1944 as Fort Industry's seventh radio station and moved to Miami outright; the call sign was changed in 1945 to WGBS, bearing Storer's initials. Storer resided in nearby Surfside and had a presence in the Miami area since 1934. By 1947, WGBS, WWVA and WAGA entered into a group affiliation deal with CBS. WJBK in Detroit was purchased in August 1946; Fort Industry owned a minority stake in the station since 1933. Regulatory approval took nearly one year and required the sale of WHIZ to the Littick family. A bidding war took place in late 1948 between Fort Industry and Crosley Broadcasting Corporation for WHAS in Louisville, Kentucky, with Storer saying the company would "dispose of certain radio facilities" to get approval; the Federal Communications Commission (FCC) was considering setting an ownership limit of seven AM stations, six FM stations and five TV stations. Both bids were rejected.

Fort Industry also sold off their minority stake in KIRO to Washington governor Monrad Wallgren in 1947 and bought majority control of the Miami Beach Sun and Star newspapers in 1948. The newspaper acquisition drew comparisons to broadcaster-turned-publisher Eugene S. Pulliam, who took over The Indianapolis Star four year earlier. The Sun, along with three other community weekly papers, were later sold to a group led by Miami Herald publisher John S. Knight in May 1963.

=== Expansion into television ===
In 1948, Fort Industry entered the television market, launching WSPD-TV in Toledo on July 21, 1948. This was followed by WJBK-TV in Detroit on October 24, 1948, and WAGA-TV in Atlanta on March 8, 1949. Fort Industry also sought a television station in Wheeling, first filing for the channel 7 allocation, then pursued channel 9 in nearby Steubenville, Ohio, after the FCC instituted "a freeze" on new license permits. WLOK and WLOK-FM were sold to Lloyd Pixley in 1951 so Fort Industry could purchase WSAI and WSAI-FM in Cincinnati, which also included a construction permit for a UHF station. The WSAI stations were sold off in 1953 to complete the purchase of WBRC and WBRC-TV in Birmingham, Alabama. KABC in San Antonio was also purchased in 1953, pairing it with KEYL, which Fort Industry purchased two years earlier; WMMN was sold off to Peoples Broadcasting. KABC and KEYL were then renamed KGBS and KGBS-TV. The corporate name changed from Fort Industry to the Storer Broadcasting Company in May 1952, reflecting a complete break from the company's industrial origins. By 1953, the company announced the moving of their corporate offices to Miami.

Examples of Storer colonial revival architecture

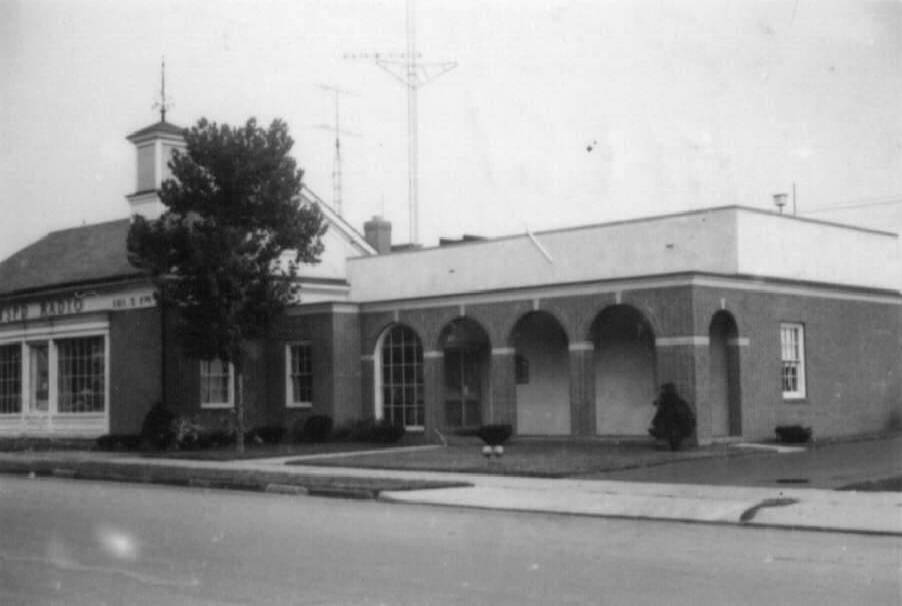
WSPD studios, Toledo.

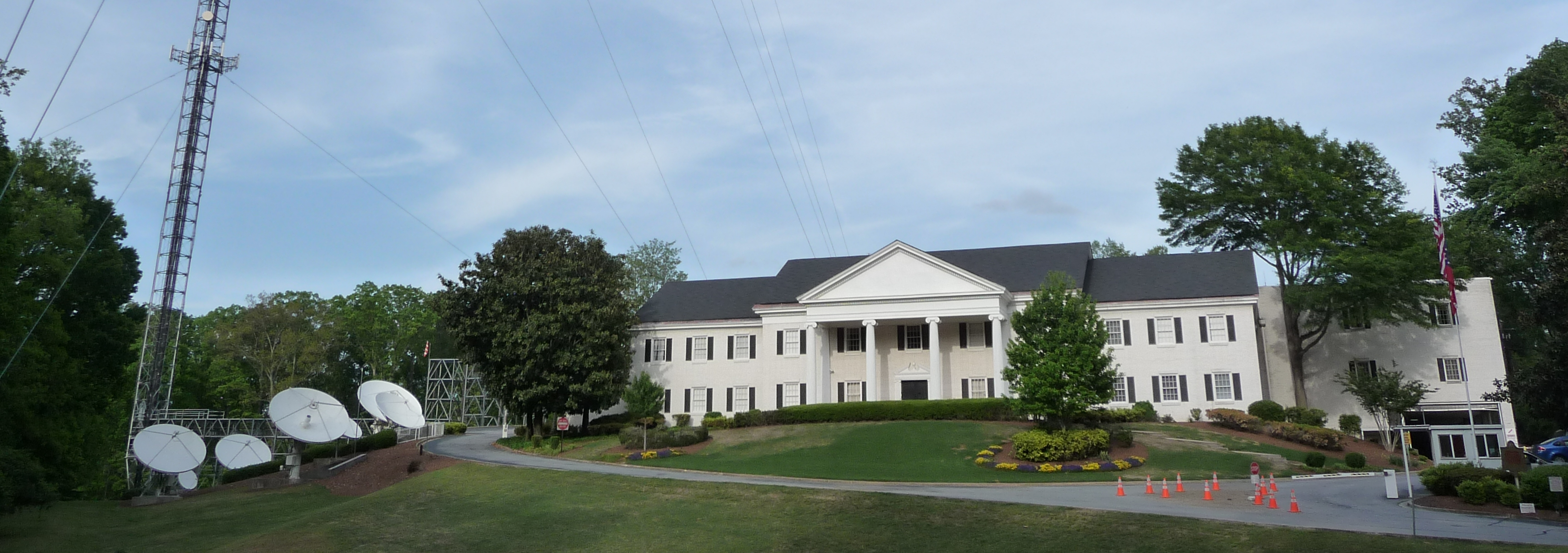
WAGA-TV studios, Atlanta.

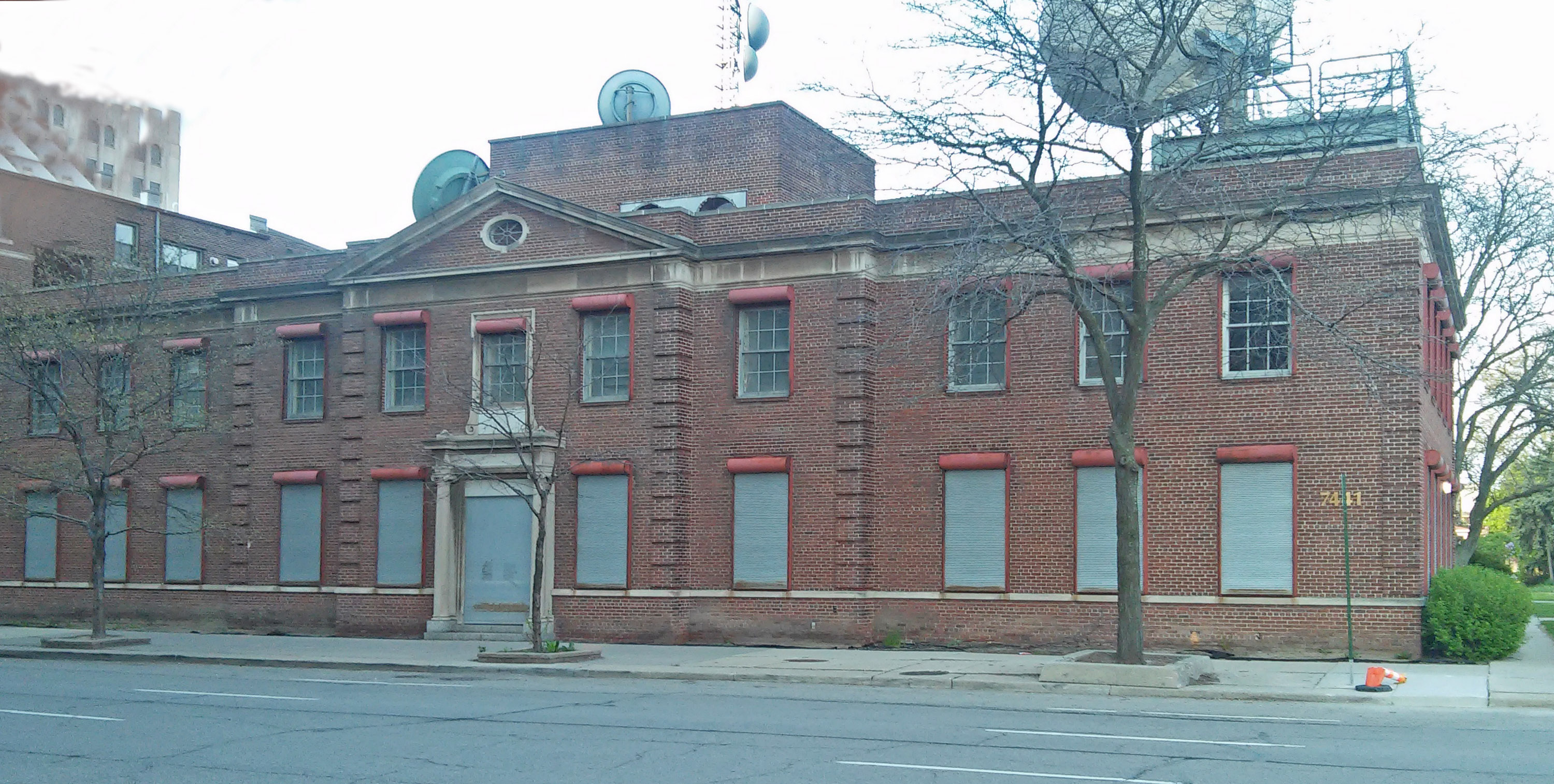
WJBK-TV studios, Detroit.

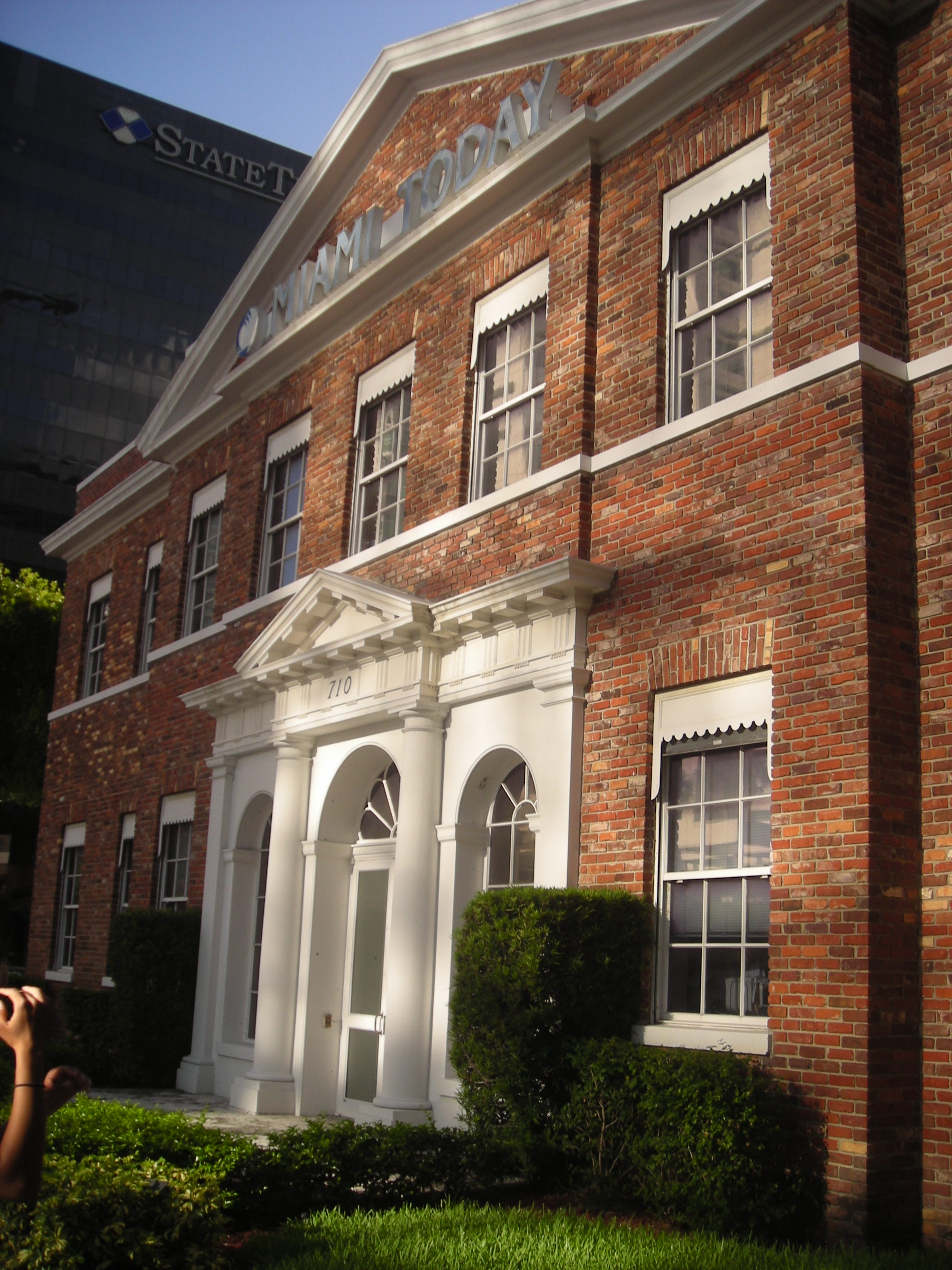
WGBS studios, Miami.

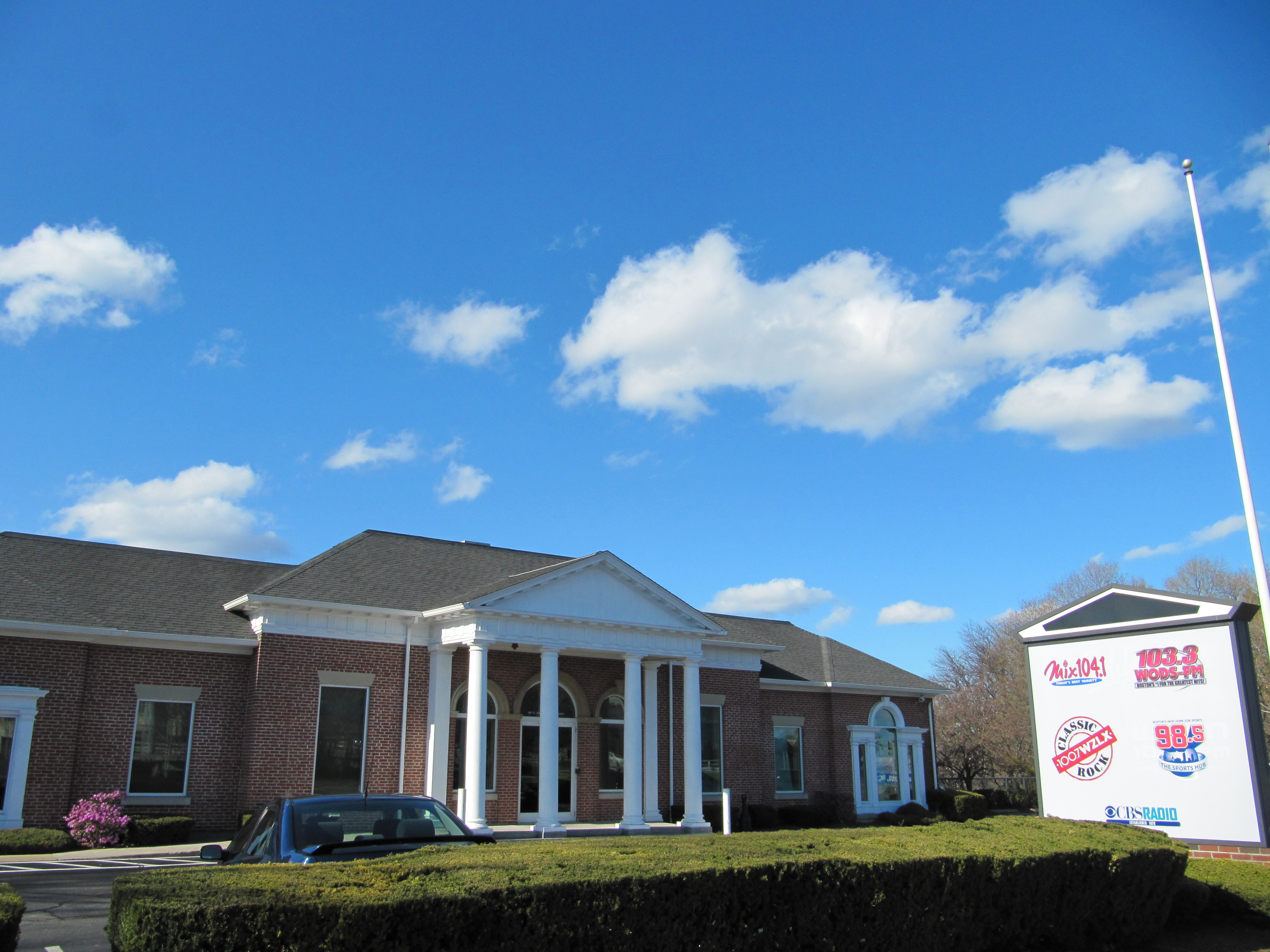
WSBK-TV studios, Boston.

The company acquired the Empire Coil Company, a manufacturer of coils and transformers for radios and the owner of WXEL in Cleveland and KPTV (channel 27) in Portland, Oregon, for $8.5 million in January 1954; the purchase came days after Empire's dispersal of KCTY, a failed UHF station in Kansas City, Missouri. KGBS and KGBS-TV were spun off to accommodate the purchase. Empire's factory in New Rochelle, New York, remained active until Storer closed it in 1955, having failed to turn a profit. WJW radio was subsequently purchased and paired with WXEL, which was renamed WJW-TV in 1956. KPTV only had 38 percent of the market's television viewers able to receive the station clearly despite substantial capital improvements, characteristic of UHF's struggles prior to the All-Channel Receiver Act. KPTV was sold off in 1957, allowing that station to "move" to VHF as a consolidation with KLOR (channel 12).

WJW's studios in Playhouse Square were remodeled into a colonial revival design that evoked 1770-era Georgian architecture; this design was also implemented at WGBS and WJBK-TV's studio building. Other stations had studios built to resemble Southern antebellum mansions, beginning with WBRC-TV in September 1954 and copied at WAGA-TV in 1966.

WBRC radio and television were sold to Taft Broadcasting in 1957; this was to facilitate the purchase of WIBG in Philadelphia and WVUE in Wilmington, Delaware, and followed an aborted sale of WAGA radio and TV to The Washington Post. WVUE was shut down in 1958 so Storer could purchase WITI in Whitefish Bay, Wisconsin, which moved to Milwaukee the following year. To complete Storer's purchase of KPOP in Los Angeles (which was renamed KGBS) WAGA and WAGA-FM were spun off to Plough, Inc. in April 1959, and renamed WPLO and WPLO-FM. WWVA and WWVA-FM were sold off in 1962 as a condition of Storer's $10.9 million purchase of WMGM in New York City, then an industry record, which reverted to the WHN call sign. WIHS-TV (channel 38) in Boston was purchased in 1966, and renamed WSBK-TV; like WBRC and WAGA, WSBK received a new studio building in 1969 with an Antebellum design.

Storer sought to upgrade KGBS, which was a daytime-only station, including a power increase to 50,000 watts that saw billing increase by 100 percent year-over-year. In 1966, FM outlet KFMU was acquired and simulcast with KGBS as KGBS-FM, providing 24-hour service to the market. The two stations instituted a country music format upon the combination. The "countrypolitan" format was expanded to Cleveland in January 1968 as WJW-FM became WCJW; Detroit followed in December 1969 with WJBK and WJBK-FM relaunched as WDEE and WDEE-FM. WGBS-FM was renamed WJHR in 1969, in tribute to Ryan, but continued featuring automated music formats.

By 1965, Storer was the nation's largest broadcaster not connected to the "Big Three" television networks (ABC, CBS and NBC) and regarded as "the first independent group broadcaster". It had a reputation of constantly selling stations in smaller markets in order to buy stations in larger markets, but made capital investments to improve and increase power for every station it owned. The gamble on television in 1948—made when other broadcast chains disparaged the medium—paid off with WAGA-TV, WSPD-TV and WJBK-TV turning a profit by 1951, surpassing all internal expectations. In 1958, Storer had a profit of $65 million and an annual income of $16 million. The company's expansion practices were emulated and copied by Corinthian Broadcasting, Cox Media Group, Capital Cities and Metromedia.

Three of George Storer's sons all held roles within Storer Broadcasting in what was referred to as the company's "informal organization". George B. Storer, Jr. began working at WAGA-TV; by 1957, he became vice president of the television division, and by 1961 was president. James Storer, who was legally blind, started work at WGBS, was general manager of WJW radio by 1962 and eventually elevated to vice president of Storer's radio division. Peter Storer also began at WGBS as an engineer; aside from a brief time at CBS Radio spot sales, Peter moved up in managerial roles to lead Storer's television sales division, and by 1967 was vice president. All three ascended to vice-presidency roles in relatively quick timeframes, accentuating the family ties. Their promotions came alongside the death of J. Harold Ryan in June 1961 at age 75, who was still actively in the role of senior vice president.

=== The Miami channel 10 license scandal ===
Storer purchased WFTL-TV (channel 23), a UHF station in Fort Lauderdale, in November 1954 and moved it to Miami as WGBS-TV. Storer repeatedly pursued a VHF allocation for WGBS, including the hotly contested channel 10, while also litigating existing FCC ownership limits of five VHF stations and two UHF stations, an effort that failed before the U.S. Supreme Court. The limitations also prevented the company from winning the channel 9 license in Wheeling. At one point, Storer threatened to move the company's offices out of Miami Beach unless the market's VHF stations were converted to UHF. WCKT (channel 7) signed on and stripped WGBS-TV of their NBC affiliation, forcing the station to operate as an independent. Storer took WGBS-TV dark in April 1957 and sold the tower, studios and land to channel 10 permit winner National Airlines, allowing WPST-TV to sign on ahead of schedule. Storer suffered a $433,000 loss while operating WGBS-TV.

After it was revealed that the FCC, in particular commissioner Richard A. Mack, had been directly influenced by National Airlines, the commission reopened the bidding process for the channel 10 license. During a congressional investigation, FCC chairman John C. Doerfer testified he previously flew to Miami on a Storer-owned plane and had been a guest of Storer on a yacht while Storer had at least one case pending before the commission. Doerfer resigned as FCC chairman and was subsequently employed as Storer's legal counsel, and later, as a vice-president. (Note: After WPST-TV's license was revoked, Storer repurchased the tower for a facility upgrade for WGBS-FM.)

=== Program syndication ===
Storer Programs, Inc. was established as the company's program syndication unit in 1962. Among their first offerings was The Littlest Hobo, a Canadian-produced adaptation of the 1958 movie of the same name that also aired in Canada over the CTV Television Network. Storer held distribution rights to several animated series, including B'wanna Don in Jungle-la, The New Adventures of Pinocchio, and Tales of the Wizard of Oz. Storer stepped in to fund completion of the second season of Hobo; McGowan International, rightsholder to the Hobo movie, sued Storer claiming this season was filmed without prior authorization. The lawsuit was settled in 1968, with Storer paying McGowan $400,000 and transferring all rights to the Hobo series back to McGowan. Storer purchased the distribution rights to the original 1957 version of Divorce Court, which proved an international success and was revived for first-run syndication in 1966. Citing a lack of profitability, Storer Programs was shut down in 1969, but Storer continued to finance production of television pilots.

In the 1980s, Storer co-produced the game show Break the Bank and a second revival of Divorce Court under a joint venture with Blair Entertainment and Kline and Friends. This revival of Divorce Court remained in production until 1990.

=== The Northeast Airlines tempest ===
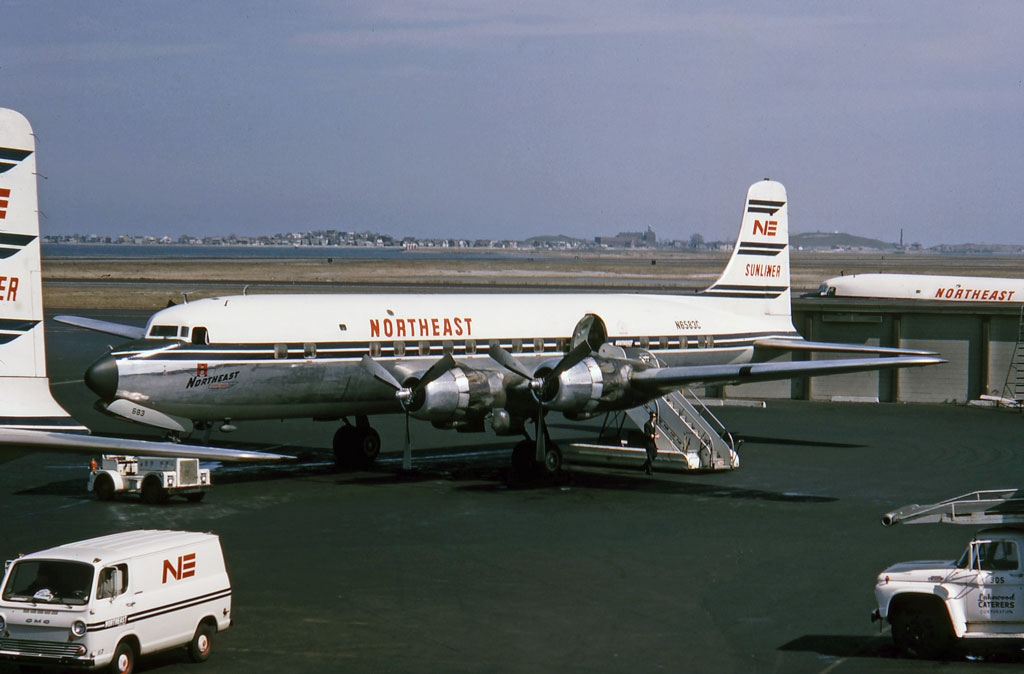
A Douglas DC-6B featuring Northeast Airlines livery, 1966.

Storer Broadcasting began examining other investments outside of broadcasting, brought on by the FCC's ownership limits of seven television stations, seven AM stations and seven FM stations, existing corporate tax structures and a lack of large-market stations available for purchase. Inspired by RKO General's majority stake in Frontier Airlines, Storer began examining airlines as they were regulated like broadcasting and not a manufacturing industry. The company agreed to purchase majority control of Northeast Airlines from Hughes Tool Company on June 2, 1965, and sold their stock in Standard Tube for $1.5 million to help finance the deal. Northeast was financially troubled with $36 million in debt and was fighting the Civil Aeronautics Board (CAB) to retain a key Miami–New York route, but as the Miami Herald analyzed the deal, "if anyone can bring Northeast Airlines back into a continuous profit picture, Storer can." Storer announced plans to reactivate WGBS-TV, which it still held the permit for, intending to have television stations in Northeast's terminals of Miami and Boston; this also precipitated their purchase of WIHS-TV, renamed WSBK-TV. (Note: Storer did not reactivate WGBS-TV and instead sold the permit in early 1967. It was relaunched later in the year as WAJA-TV.)

Storer became Northeast's board chairman and promised to go "first class" to help turn around the airline. While this was seen as a risk, the company had a history of not being risk-averse. George Storer, Jr. became chairman of the airline board, which he held through 1967, and created the "Yellowbird" advertising campaign; pilot/historian Capt. Robert Mudge credited George Jr. as "... a blessing, he saved the airline". Northeast also prevailed in their fight to keep the Miami–New York route. However, Northeast's financial troubles never improved: in 1967, it lost $3.8 million, following by losses of $2.67 million, $28.8 million, $10.7 million and $14 million in 1968, 1969, 1970 and 1971, respectively. The planes were obsolete, prompting Storer to establish a subsidiary specifically to buy new planes and lease them back to the airline. In 1972, the airline's closest competition, National Airlines, had twice as much revenue as Northeast, while United Airlines outperformed Northeast in revenue by a 12:1 margin. George Storer personally came to regret the purchase and told stockholders in 1970, "we were losing more money in a year than I'd ever thought of making in a year."

This financial burden induced Storer to sell WIBG and all but one of their FM stations. WIBG was sold in 1969 to Buckley Broadcasting for $6 million. In 1970, WJHR and WDEE-FM were sold to Bartell Broadcasters for $1.2 million. WPNA (the former WIBG-FM, which had been taken dark) was sold with WCJW to SJR Communications in 1971 for $1.4 million, while WSPD-FM was concurrently sold to Susquehanna Broadcasting. KGBS-FM was the only FM station retained. The company considered selling KGBS-AM-FM in 1969 for $1.8 million and a $500,000 non-compete agreement, but this deal never materialized. Storer sought a merger of Northeast into Northwest Orient in 1969, but this fell through after the CAB denied a request for the combined airline to retain a profitable Florida route. Northeast merged into Delta Air Lines in 1971, with Storer becoming that airline's largest shareholder; the airline-leasing subsidiary was sold to Delta by 1976 for $12 million.

=== Boston Bruins and Garden ownership ===
Storer merged into the Boston Garden-Arena Corporation, owner of the Boston Bruins and their home arena, the Boston Garden, on December 7, 1972, for $16–17 million in stock. The merger was seen as a logical fit, as WSBK-TV prominently featured Bruins games. George Storer was also not a stranger to professional sports, as he owned the Miami Marlins minor league baseball team, had a minority interest in the Detroit Lions, and sought an NFL team of his own. Robert Schmertz, owner of the Boston Celtics and New England Whalers (both tenants of the Garden) resented Storer's purchase, believing the company now exerted control of the local media, and threatened to have the Celtics play in Providence, Rhode Island, for part of the 1973–74 season as leases for the two teams lapsed. The Garden was also showing signs of age after 50 years, and was not built with air conditioning despite heavy usage throughout the year.

Elected officials, along with the Celtics and Whalers, advocated for a replacement arena, but costs for a new facility grew from $18–20 million to $28 million after a site change. The cost of renovating the Garden was estimated at $12 million; Storer declined to pay for the repairs, believing it was not worth the return on investment. Peter Storer, who succeeded George Storer as company president in 1973, deemed the costs of a new arena as onerous. Addressing criticism the company was acting as a stumbling block, Peter placed the Garden for sale in June 1974 to "... parties who feel that they can better serve the needs of Greater Boston". Boston Globe columnist Leigh Montville ridiculed Peter as an out-of-touch Miami Beach businessman only focused on money, saying, "[t]he man is a businessman. If Hogan's Heroes is making big money for his television station, he's not going to give you the Bolshoi or Ibsen's dramas at a reduced profit. That's business. You're left with that 20th-century head scratch."

Negotiations for a sale restarted in earnest in July 1975 after a disappointing 1974–75 Bruins season that also saw declining ratings for game coverage on WSBK; the team's existing television contract, effectively a paper transaction, was slated to run through 1978. Delaware North and chairman Jeremy Jacobs agreed to purchase the team and arena in August 1975 for an undisclosed price. Several months after the sale, company chairman George Storer died on November 4, 1975; Bill Michaels, a longtime associate, succeeded Storer as chairman.

=== Pivoting towards cable ===
The company purchased its first cable television system in September 1963 in Thousand Oaks, California. Unlike many cable operators, Storer preferred to acquire franchises and build its cable systems; expanding further into California during the 1960s and entering the Sarasota, Florida, market by 1970. By 1971, Storer had 57,000 subscribers among their franchises. As the FCC limited or prevented the expansion of cable into large markets during this period, Storer sought smaller markets as "fill-in" services and sought to take time to build their subscriber base. The FCC began emphasizing local program production among franchisees, which Storer took advantage of. In 1975, satellites began to be used to further transmission of cable networks, coupled with more friendly policy towards the industry by the FCC. Peter Storer began asserting himself as president of the company, a noted change from predecessor George Storer's low profile; George was also unconvinced of cable's financial potential despite having been an early influence in its development.

By 1977, Storer's cable division served over 200,000 subscribers in five states, and accounted for 15 percent of total revenue; within a year, it grew to 300,000 subscribers in nine states, and 22 percent of total revenue. Storer made a $55 million offer to purchase Viacom primarily for the syndicator's cable systems unit, but the bid was rejected within days. While unsuccessful, it marked a departure by Storer from making future acquisitions unrelated to broadcasting: the divestments of Northeast and the Bruins freed Storer from debt, and the company had a growing reserve of cash. Storer's commitment to radio remained unclear, but was aided by the sale of WJW to Lake Erie Broadcasting, an Art Modell-headed syndicate, in 1977 for $2.5 million; the deal represented "a significant profit" as the station was starting to lose money. Previously, WDEE was sold to Globetrotters Communications in 1973 for $4.2 million.

Storer purchased KCST (channel 39) in San Diego in March 1973 for $12 million to become their seventh television station, again reaching the maximum limit of five VHF stations and two UHF stations. This came as KCST was set to take over as the market's ABC affiliate from XETV in Tijuana, a switch initiated through FCC intervention. Despite improved ratings, ABC disaffiliated from KCST in 1977 in favor of KGTV. In turn, Storer disaffiliated WITI from ABC—which it had been affiliated with since 1961—in favor of CBS, while KCST switched to NBC.

By December 1978, Storer announced their remaining radio stations were for sale, including WLYF in Miami and WLAK in Chicago, which were both purchased earlier in the year. Bill Michaels and Peter Storer stated "the world has changed" and the divestments were necessary given Storer's publicly traded status. The company's board of directors also approved a $100 million expansion into cable. The deciding factor came when KGBS was relaunched in 1976 as KTNQ, with a power upgrade, switch to full-time broadcasting and $1.5 million in investments, but experts estimated KTNQ required an additional $4 million to remain viable. KTNQ was sold to Liberman Broadcasting and KHTZ (the former KGBS-FM) was sold to Greater Media. In 1979 alone, WGBS and WLYF were sold to Jefferson-Pilot Communications for $12.5 million, the Mutual Broadcasting System purchased WHN for $14 million, and WSPD was sold to Wood Broadcasting for $3.3 million. (WSPD-TV was renamed WTVG.) WLAK was sold to Viacom in 1981 for $8 million, owing to then-FCC restrictions requiring Storer to own the station for at least three years.

Michaels relinquished day-to-day control of the company to Peter Storer on January 1, 1980, then announced his retirement on April 27, 1982, at the company's annual meeting; Storer was elevated from vice-chairman to chairman. The company's name became Storer Communications, Inc. on January 1, 1983, coinciding with the stock symbol changing to SCI; headquarters were also moved from Bay Harbor Islands to North Miami. By 1985, it not only owned the seven television stations, but held cable television franchises to 500 communities in 18 states and served 1.5 million subscribers, and was the fourth-largest cable operator in the country. Such expansion was costly: Storer invested over $1.2 billion over the five-year expansion project, building large and elaborate systems that quickly became unprofitable. The company bid for franchises at any cost under the belief that once a franchise was taken by a competitor, it would not be available again. Storer reported losses of $39.6 million and $17.3 million in 1983 and 1984, respectively, and lost $5.7 million during the first quarter of 1985, all of it coming from the heavy investments into cable.

=== Investor proxy fight and privatization by KKR ===
A proxy war over control of the company began in April 1985, after Coniston Partners—led by Paul E. Tierney, an activist shareholder—purchased enough shares in the company's stock to earn four seats on the company's board of directors, then pursued a liquidation. Amid the threats by the Coniston investors, Comcast and TCI showed interest in purchasing the cable division. In turn, the rest of the board members took out full-page newspaper advertisements urging other shareholders to reject the Coniston takeover attempt. Storer initiated a plan to repurchase up to six million of their 16.4 million outstanding shares in order to mollify Coniston's influence; this was quickly superseded by an offer from Kohlberg Kravis Roberts (KKR) to take the company private in a $1.6 billion leveraged buyout. The board signed an agreement to accept KKR's offer as it provided more immediate cash on hand for the shareholders, doing so in advance of the company's annual executive meeting.

Peter Storer was expected to remain as chairman and was described as having "survived" the proxy war, but was now part of a management team that only held a 7.2 percent ownership stake in Storer, which was folded into SCI Holdings, a holding company within KKR. While the company did not describe this move as a "poison pill", a term Miami News columnist Merwin Sigale used, it led to Comcast withdrawing their interest and ensured no one else could match or best KKR's bid. The buyout also placed significant debt on the company: Terry Lee later said of Coniston, "[m]y personal opinion is what they do may not be illegal, but it borders on being immoral". Storer retired as chairman in January 1986, shortly after the buyout was completed, and later expressed disappointment over the privatization. Lee succeeded him as chairman.

KKR's buyout came one year after taking Wometco Enterprises private following the death of chairman Mitchell Wolfson, and was in the process of breaking it up. Wometco's WTVJ in Miami, WWHT/WSNL in New York City and their cable systems in Atlanta were still under KKR control, prompting the FCC to direct KKR to sell either WTVJ, WAGA-TV and WWHT/WSNL, or the cable systems in each station's service area, within 18 months as conditions for their approval. It recognized KKR as the owner of both companies and violating cross-ownership regulations. The FCC also ordered KKR to sell WTVG as its signal overlapped with WJBK-TV and WJW-TV, which was previously grandfathered prior to the buyout. KKR opted to sell WTVJ and the Storer stations in an attempted $1.85 billion sale to Lorimar-Telepictures that fell apart when CBS chairman Laurence Tisch objected to the deal, threatening to buy another Miami station at a discount and disaffiliate the other Storer stations from the network. Following this, WTVJ was sold off to NBC while WTVG was spun off to a company headed by Terry Lee; Lee resigned from Storer after the deal was completed and was succeeded by Kenneth Bagwell.

=== Breakup and dissolution ===
SCI Holdings, now solely controlling Storer Cable, was put up for sale in 1987 but an outright asset sale was decided against as KKR was reportedly prevented from doing so due to debt covenants taken in the buyout. The cable group was sold to a group of competing cable systems including Comcast, TCI and ATC (the cable division of Time Inc.), in a $1.7 billion deal. The all-stock deal kept Storer Cable as a nominally separate company controlled by the partnership. Michael Tallent became president of Storer upon the consummation of this transaction, succeeding Bagwell. Tallent joined Comcast in 1991 and was succeeded by William Whelan; the company was expected to be broken up in the coming years and described as "not in acquisition mode". TCI and Comcast jointly purchased Storer Cable from the partnership in September 1992 and was divided in half, with franchises reassigned based on the closest proximity of either company's regional offices. The Storer name was phased out in favor of either TCI or Comcast beginning in late 1993.

George N. Gillett Jr. bought majority control of the Storer stations (renamed SCI Television) in April 1987, financed through junk bonds. This deal also included Storer's syndication unit and sales divisions, and their news bureau in Washington, D.C. Such financing was raised prior to Black Monday, placing Gillett in a 10:1 debt-to-profit ratio. Rumors persisted of Gillett divesting stations either held directly by him or the SCI subsidiary, particularly WJW-TV, which was one of the chain's standouts. While Gillett did sell off his Nashville station WSMV-TV, it failed to shore up the financials of Gillett Holdings, which missed a critical loan payment in October 1989. One reorganization brought on by a bankruptcy threat in 1990 reduced Gillett's majority control of SCI to 41 percent, while a Chapter 11 restructuring in January 1992 placed Gillett as a minority owner of the holding company, now majority-owned by the bondholders. Another reorganization saw investor Ronald Perelman purchase majority control of SCI for $100 million on February 17, 1993, forcing Gillett out entirely.

Perelman folded SCI into New World Entertainment to form New World Communications, then struck a wide-reaching affiliation pact with Fox in May 1994 after News Corporation invested $500 million into New World. This resulted in the majority of the former Storer stations, including WBRC-TV, switching to Fox between 1994 and 1996. (Note: WTVG was also involved in a side transaction related to this pact, as Capital Cities/ABC acquired it and WJRT in Flint, Michigan, on October 3, 1994, for $155 million. WTVG remained an ABC-owned station until 2011.) News Corp. later purchased New World outright in 1996.

== Former stations ==
- Stations are arranged in alphabetical order by state and city of license.
- Two boldface asterisks appearing following a station's call letters (**) indicate a station built and signed on by either Fort Industry or Storer.

Stations owned by Fort Industry and/or Storer Broadcasting
Media market	State/Prov.	Station	Purchased	Sold	Notes
Birmingham	Alabama	WBRC	1953	1957	
Birmingham	Alabama	WBRC-FM	1953	1957	
Birmingham	Alabama	WBRC-TV	1953	1957	
Los Angeles	California	KTNQ	1959	1979	(Note: Known as KGBS from 1959 to 1976.)
Los Angeles	California	KGBS-FM	1966	1979	(Note: Known as KHTZ from 1978 onward.)
San Diego	California	KCST-TV	1974	1987	
Miami–Fort Lauderdale	Florida	WGBS	1944	1979	
Miami–Fort Lauderdale	Florida	WGBS-FM **	1948	1971	(Note: Known as WJHR from 1969 to 1971.)
Miami–Fort Lauderdale	Florida	WGBS-TV	1954	1967	
Miami–Fort Lauderdale	Florida	WLYF	1978	1979	
Atlanta	Georgia	WAGA	1940	1959	
Atlanta	Georgia	WAGA-FM **	1948	1959	
Atlanta	Georgia	WAGA-TV **	1949	1987	
Chicago	Illinois	WLAK	1978	1981	
Boston	Massachusetts	WSBK-TV	1966	1987	
Detroit	Michigan	WGHP	1928	1930	
Detroit	Michigan	WJBK	1947	1973	(Note: Known as WDEE from 1969 to 1973.)
Detroit	Michigan	WJBK-FM **	1947	1971	(Note: Known as WDEE-FM from 1969 to 1971.)
Detroit	Michigan	WJBK-TV **	1948	1987	
New York City	New York	WHN	1962	1979	
Cincinnati	Ohio	WSAI	1951	1953	
Cincinnati	Ohio	WSAI-FM	1951	1953	
Cleveland	Ohio	WJW	1954	1977	
Cleveland	Ohio	WJW-FM	1954	1971	(Note: Known as WCJW from 1968 to 1971.)
Cleveland	Ohio	WJW-TV	1954	1987	(Note: Known as WXEL prior to 1956 and WJKW-TV from 1977 to 1985.)
Lima	Ohio	WLOK	1938	1951	
Lima	Ohio	WLOK-FM **	1948	1951	
Toledo	Ohio	WSPD	1928	1979	
Toledo	Ohio	WSPD-FM **	1946	1971	
Toledo	Ohio	WTVG **	1948	1987	(Note: Known as WSPD-TV from 1948 to 1979.)
Zanesville	Ohio	WHIZ	1939	1947	
Portland	Oregon	KPTV	1954	1957	
Philadelphia	Pennsylvania	WIBG	1957	1969	
Philadelphia	Pennsylvania	WIBG-FM	1957	1971	(Note: Known as WPNA from 1969 to 1971.)
Philadelphia	Pennsylvania	WVUE	1957	1958	
San Antonio	Texas	KABC	1951	1954	(Note: Known as KGBS in 1954.)
San Antonio	Texas	KEYL	1951	1954	(Note: Known as KGBS-TV in 1954.)
Fairmont	West Virginia	WMMN	1935	1953	
Wheeling	West Virginia	WWVA	1931	1962	
Wheeling	West Virginia	WWVA-FM **	1947	1962	
Milwaukee	Wisconsin	WITI	1958	1987	
Windsor	Ontario	CKLW **	1932	1936	(Note: Known as CKOK from 1932 to 1933.)
