= WRTO-FM =

- Goulds, Florida; United States
- Broadcast area: Miami-Fort Lauderdale-Hollywood
- Frequency: 98.3 MHz (HD Radio)
- Branding: Mix 98.3 Trending y Variada

Programming
- Language: Spanish
- Format: Tropical music
- Subchannels: HD2: Rock en español HD4: TUDN Radio

Ownership
- Owner: Uforia Audio Network; (Univision Radio Stations Group, Inc.)
- Sister stations: Radio: WAMR-FM; TV: WLTV-DT, WAMI-DT

History
- First air date: February 1976 (as WGLY)
- Former call signs: WGLY (1976–1984); WTHM (1984–1988); WAQI-FM (1988–1990); WRTO (1990–2003); WRTO-FM (2003–2010); WURM (2010)
- Call sign meaning: "Ritmo" ("rhythm" in Spanish)

Technical information
- Licensing authority: FCC
- Facility ID: 37253
- Class: C
- ERP: 100,000 watts
- HAAT: 429 meters (1407 ft)
- Transmitter coordinates: 25°32′24.00″N 80°28′7.00″W

Links
- Public license information: Public file; LMS
- Webcast: Listen Live
- Website: mix983.univision.com

WRTO-FM (98.3 MHz "Mix 98.3") is a commercial FM radio station licensed to Goulds, Florida, and serving the Miami-Fort Lauderdale-Hollywood radio market. The station airs a tropical music radio format, broadcasting in Spanish. It is owned by Uforia Audio Network under the name Univision Radio Stations Group, Inc.

WRTO-FM's studios and offices are in Coral Gables, Florida and the transmitter is off Coconut Palm Drive (SW 248th Street) in Homestead. WRTO-FM is a Class C FM station with an effective radiated power (ERP) of 100,000 watts from a tower at 1407 feet (429.1 m) in height above average terrain (HAAT). The signal reaches from north of Fort Lauderdale to Marathon Key.

The station also broadcasts using the HD radio format. Its logo looks similar to KBBT in San Antonio, Texas.

== History ==
In February 1976, the station went on the air as WGLY. It was owned by the Fine Arts Broadcasting Company and aired a contemporary Christian music format. WGLY could only operate with 1,100 watts from a height of 460 feet, limiting its signal to southern Dade County, Florida. For a short time, the station switched to a smooth jazz format.

On November 1, 1984, the station changed to an urban contemporary format as WTHM "Rhythm 98." In 1986, the station was bought by Mambisa Broadcasting, which also owned AM 710 WAQI, a Spanish language news/talk outlet in Miami. On January 22, 1988, the FM station flipped to Spanish adult contemporary, and on September 15, 1988, its call sign was switched to WAQI-FM to match its AM sister station.

On April 16, 1990, the station changed call letters to WRTO, to reflect its younger, more rhythmic sound. The call sign stands for "ritmo", the Spanish word for "rhythm."

In the mid-1990s, the Federal Communications Commission relaxed its rules which had limited the maximum power permitted for Class A FM frequencies. WRTO at 98.3 MHz, had been on a channel only for Class A stations. But it applied for and received a construction permit to greatly increase its power to 100,000 watts, to match other prominent Miami-area FM stations, and allowing it to become a Class C station.

In 2003, the current owner, Univision Radio, acquired WRTO. On October 21, 2003, the call sign was changed to WRTO-FM, concurrent with a Univision-owned AM station in Chicago becoming WRTO. The signal upgrade was completed a short time after Univision's take over. On June 24, 2010, the call letters switched to WURM, and on July 28, 2010, back to the current WRTO-FM.
