= WMJX (Miami) =

Radio station in Miami, Florida (1948–1981)

- Miami, Florida; United States
- Broadcast area: South Florida
- Frequency: 96.3 MHz
- Branding: 96X

Ownership
- Owner: The Charter Company; (Bartell Broadcasting of Florida, Inc.)

History
- First air date: August 1948
- Last air date: February 15, 1981
- Former call signs: WGBS-FM (1948–1969); WJHR (1969–1971); WMYQ (1971–1975)
- Call sign meaning: Chosen to avoid confusion with stations using "Q" call letters

Technical information
- Class: C
- ERP: 98,000 watts
- HAAT: 799 feet (244 m)
- Transmitter coordinates: 25°57′31″N 80°12′43″W

WMJX was a commercial radio station licensed to Miami, Florida, United States, that broadcast at 96.3 FM from 1948 to 1981. The station was last owned by The Charter Company. WMJX's broadcast license was revoked by the Federal Communications Commission due to the use of fake news stories to promote a 1975 contest and an error in which advertisers were billed for commercials that did not air.

== History ==
=== WGBS-FM and WJHR ===
WGBS-FM began broadcasting in August 1948. The station was owned by the Fort Industry Company—later and better known as Storer Broadcasting—and served as the companion and simulcast partner to WGBS (710 AM). WGBS-FM broadcast with an effective radiated power of 1,400 watts. Deviations from its AM simulcast were few: in 1953, WGBS allowed the University of Miami to broadcast its special events over the FM transmitter. As a result, WGBS-FM broke away to air baseball games and concerts by the university symphony orchestra. By 1957, WGBS-FM's operating hours had been limited to six hours a day, six days a week.

Despite the limited hours, the late 1950s and 1960s led to improvements for WGBS-FM. Two power increases, to 18 kW (authorized in 1959) and 100 kW (in 1964), expanded the station's coverage area. WGBS-FM proved more useful during the Cuban Missile Crisis, when night airtime on WGBS and two other high-power Miami AM stations was used for Voice of America broadcasts to Cuba; the station continued local service on FM during the three weeks that airtime was requisitioned. The March 1968 fire that wiped out WAJA-TV's studios also affected the WGBS-FM transmitter, housed alongside its former sister station.

In May 1969, WGBS-FM became WJHR, honoring Storer co-founder J. Harold Ryan. Most of the station's music programming, which varied in format over the years, was automated as WJHR.

=== Sale to Bartell ===
In 1970, Storer announced its intention to sell all but one of the company's FM stations. In the first such sale, Bartell Broadcasting acquired WJHR and WDEE-FM in Detroit in a $1,225,000 deal made public in April. The sale closed early in 1971, and WJHR gave way to Top 40-formatted WMYQ.

WMYQ was the first major FM Top 40 outlet in South Florida, an aggressive, promotionally minded outlet that gave away some $50,000 a year in its contests. The station hired Roby Yonge away from competitor WLQY (soon to become WHYI-FM) in 1973 to do mornings and fired him the next year amidst a major staff shakeup. Generally, the station was considered a revolving door of talent and management; other notable people to work for WMYQ included Lee Abrams, Jerry Clifton, Kris Erik Stevens, Jack McCoy and Lee Baby Simms.

The staff shakeup came at a critical time for WMYQ. The Charter Company of Jacksonville had agreed to acquire six Bartell stations for $8.675 million that June; additionally, WHYI "Y-100" had gone on air in August 1973 and rocketed over the next 18 months to number two in the market, driving three other stations out of Top 40 in the process. In early 1975, with ratings not improving, the station shook up its news staff.

=== Changes and contesting problems ===
On December 18, 1974, the Federal Communications Commission (FCC) censured Bartell for its conduct in running the "Magnum One" contest, saying that WMYQ had overstated the prize as being a "massive treasure" when it was only worth $10,000.

Citing a crowded marketplace with a glut of "Q" call signs causing listener confusion, WMYQ became WMJX on October 1, 1975. However, a battle was just beginning. The next year, the FCC designated WMJX's license renewal for hearing over falsified news and misleading advertising. The centerpiece of the allegations was an April 1975 vacation contest by morning personality Greg Austin, who created reports from the Devil's Triangle that were integrated into the station's newscasts. Another area of concern was inconsistent billing practices, which general manager Carl Como pinned on the transition to a computerized billing system, during which time the station did not broadcast commercials on Sundays but some new invoices went out billing advertisers for them.

Even as the station's license challenge remained pending, WMJX made ratings improvements. By the start of 1977, it had closed the gap with WHYI to less than a rating point and climbed to a tie for fourth place in the overall market. However, the challenge forced Bartell, now fully owned by Downe Communications, to scrap a sale of its WADO New York when the FCC conditioned action on the license transfer on the WMJX hearing.

Administrative law judge Thomas B. Fitzpatrick issued his initial decision in January 1978 and ruled that Bartell Broadcasting of Florida should not have WMJX's license renewed; in addition to the issues raised in the hearing, he noted the 1974 censure over the Magnum One contest. At the same time, its ratings fell again, with WHYI retaking a commanding lead. Bartell attempted to take advantage of the FCC's then-new distress sale policy and sell WMJX to Wave Communications, a Black-owned firm, for $1 million, though the FCC denied the request in July 1979 because the initial decision was adverse to Bartell. Charter had, in its attempts to appease the FCC, removed local management and some personnel at its corporate office; it had also increased WMJX's charitable involvement. However, the station struggled to overcome such revelations as the discovery by new management that the station had attempted to improve its ratings by giving away stereo equipment to a family that had four Arbitron diaries; the station dismissed the employee responsible.

WMJX and WHYI were responsible for forcing the Bee Gees to bring forward the release date of their new album Spirits Having Flown; WHYI began playing an alleged pirate copy of the album on the air, followed by WMJX. In the ensuing saga, WMJX DJ Russ Oasis was fired after he called WHYI to see if they were still broadcasting it, then played the telephone call on the station, violating FCC rules.

=== Final years ===
In February 1979, WMJX pivoted to all-disco. The format did not last, and by 1980, WMJX was back to top 40 and rumored for a flip to country.

After fighting for years in an attempt to keep the license, Charter indicated to Broadcasting magazine at the start of 1981 that it would abandon its efforts and shut the station down soon. However, station management indicated it had plans to continue the appeal, saying that Charter should not be held responsible for Bartell's indiscretions; the FCC countered by noting the two were now under common ownership. In early February, the station announced it would close at 12:01 a.m. on Sunday, February 15. At that time, Bob Allen, the general manager of the station, issued a final statement. The final song played was "The Long and Winding Road" by The Beatles. After the song finished, Stuart Elliot signed the station off and spoke, while fighting tears, "96X is WMJX, Miami."

== Fight for a successor ==
Even before WMJX had left the air, applications came to the Federal Communications Commission (FCC) for the frequency it would vacate, with the initial field yielding more than 60 interested parties. In 1982, the FCC designated seven applications for hearing: South Florida Broadcasting Company, Radiocentro Broadcasting Company, First Black Broadcasters of Miami, Constance J. Wodlinger, Onyx Broadcasting of Miami, Rana Broadcasting Company, and Southwest Radio Enterprises. The new station would receive as its final assignment 96.5 MHz, instead of 96.3, as WMJX would have been relocated there anyway in a 1980 reallocation of various FM station frequencies in Florida.

In the case of Radiocentro and Southwest Radio, proposals to use WMJX's former antenna, diplexed with WAIA on the tower of WPBT, came into doubt when WAIA indicated it no longer had the capacity to diplex another station on its antenna and would not diplex a new station—a blow to Radiocentro. Other applicants proposed using a site on the candelabra tower built by Guy Gannett Communications. The initial decision, issued on May 16, 1984, gave the nod to South Florida Broadcasting, owned by former state representative Elaine Bloom, which proposed an ethnic radio station. The FCC dismissed the Rana bid because Liberty City, as a neighborhood of Miami, was not sufficient to be a community of license; Onyx, which was 30 percent owned and managed by WPLG-TV anchor Dwight Lauderdale, could not prove its financial qualifications adequately; and First Black had attempted to block other applicants from using the candelabra.

However, on appeal, the FCC Review Board remanded the case to the administrative law judge in December 1984, over the antenna site issues of various applicants. With the case droning on, Wodlinger emerged from the crowd: in 1985, she moved to buy out all of the competing applicants and win the frequency. On June 15, 1985, the new station launched using the 96X moniker and the WCJX call letters. (Within months of WMJX folding, a radio station in Boston picked up the call letters.) The $2.95 million investment Wodlinger made paid off when Beasley Broadcast Group acquired WCJX in September for $10.6 million, entering the Miami market.
