= WLTV-DT =

Television station in Miami

- Miami–Fort Lauderdale–; West Palm Beach, Florida; United States
- City: Miami, Florida
- Channels: Digital: 23 (UHF); Virtual: 23
- Branding: Univision 23; Noticias N+ Univision 23 (newscasts)

Programming
- Affiliations: 23.1: Univision; for others, see § Subchannels

Ownership
- Owner: TelevisaUnivision; (WLTV License Partnership, G.P.)
- Sister stations: WAMI-DT; WAMR-FM; WRTO-FM

History
- Founded: May 5, 1953
- First air date: November 14, 1967
- Former call signs: WFTL-TV (1953–1954); WGBS-TV (1954–1957); WAJA-TV (1967–1971); WLTV (1971–2009)
- Former channel numbers: Analog: 23 (UHF, 1967–2009); Digital: 24 (UHF, 2002–2009)
- Former affiliations: Independent (1967–1971)
- Call sign meaning: Latin American Television

Technical information
- Licensing authority: FCC
- Facility ID: 73230
- ERP: 1,000 kW
- HAAT: 297 m (974 ft)
- Transmitter coordinates: 25°58′8″N 80°13′19″W

Links
- Public license information: Public file; LMS
- Website: www.univision.com/local/miami-wltv

WLTV-DT (channel 23) is a television station in Miami, Florida, United States, serving as the local Univision outlet. It is one of two flagship stations of the Spanish-language network (the other being WXTV-DT in the New York City market). WLTV-DT is owned and operated by TelevisaUnivision alongside Hollywood, Florida–licensed UniMás station WAMI-DT (channel 69). The two stations share studios known as "NewsPort" (a 150,000-square-foot [13,900 m^{2}] converted studio facility that also houses the global TelevisaUnivision headquarters as well as N+ Univision) on Northwest 30th Terrace in Doral; WLTV-DT's transmitter is located on NW 210th Street near Andover, Florida. The station also serves as the de facto Univision outlet for the West Palm Beach market, as that area does not have a Univision station of its own.

== History ==
=== Prior history of UHF channel 23 in South Florida ===
Channel 23 was initially allocated to Fort Lauderdale and was built by WFTL-TV, which went on the air on May 5, 1953, and was the first UHF station in the state of Florida. It was affiliated with NBC and owned by the Tri-County Broadcasting Company alongside WFTL (1400 AM). In 1954, it was purchased by Storer Broadcasting; in order to allow the station to move south, Storer also purchased the construction permit for WMIE-TV, an unbuilt Miami station on channel 27. Using WFTL-TV's assets and the Miami license location, channel 23 became WGBS-TV in December 1954 and moved to higher-power facilities the next year.

Channel 23 struggled in an environment where most UHF viewers needed converters to see the station and competing against a VHF outlet, WTVJ (channel 4), as well as stations that had started in West Palm Beach. Storer's attempts to obtain the ability to apply for a VHF station or change the market to all-UHF service were denied. In 1956, WCKT started on channel 7 and took the NBC affiliation; WGBS-TV limped along until April 1957, when it sold its equipment and studio site to new VHF station WPST-TV (channel 10) before shutting down April 13.

Storer retained the operating authority for channel 23 and repurchased the transmitter facility in 1964, after WPST-TV lost its license three years prior (WPST-TV's replacement, WLBW-TV, had its own studio and transmitter facilities). It announced plans to reactivate the station in 1966 but never followed through.

=== The return of channel 23 ===
In May 1967, Storer reached a deal to sell the WGBS-TV construction permit and lease the tower site to Coastal Broadcasting System, owned by Al Lapin, Jr., one of the founders of IHOP, and Abe Finkel, who was a franchisee of 15 IHOP restaurants. The station returned to the air after more than a decade of inactivity on November 14, 1967, as WAJA-TV. The call sign came from Finkel's AJA Corporation.

WAJA-TV presented daily stock market reporting during the business day using The Stock Market Observer format pioneered by WCIU-TV in Chicago. Children's and sports programs were also heavily featured on the new station. Use of the transmitter site studio in Hallandale was approved in February 1968, over the protest of dozens of area homeowners. Something else was also creeping onto WAJA-TV's schedule within months of the station's return: weekend double features of Spanish-language movies.

On the morning of March 23, 1968, a trash pile near the building caught fire, evidently from children playing with matches; the blaze spread through the air conditioning system to soundproof installation and destroyed all five of the station's cameras and other equipment, a loss of more than $500,000; quick thinking by staff was cited for lessening the cost. The station was on the air the next afternoon; the stock market show went on air that Monday using equipment leased from WCKT; and Scantlin Electronics, supplier of the equipment used for the stock market program which was valued at $150,000, rerouted a demonstration unit intended for display at that year's National Association of Broadcasters convention to Miami.

In late 1968, channel 23 tried its hand at local talk, with a four-night-a-week talk show called Talk! Back 23, with each night having a different host. Early 1969 also saw the debut of a local version of Bozo the Clown under the banner "Bozo's Big Top".

A seminal turn in station history took place in the first half of 1969. The stock market program ended on February 14, 1969, due to the lack of sponsor support, and channel 23 began to sign on at 4 p.m. On March 30, the station began leasing 43 hours a week of airtime, mostly during the day, to a group of seven investors known as Tele-Cuba, Inc. Under the leadership of Cuban exiles José Alfredo López and Aramis del Real, Tele-Cuba presented Spanish-language programming from its own studios in Miami. del Real had previously helped organize two telethons aimed at Spanish-speaking viewers on the station.

While Tele-Cuba soon collapsed due to lack of financial support, WAJA-TV opted to take the road they had charted and follow it itself, airing some Spanish shows during daytime hours. That July, channel 23 went all-Spanish on weekends, with Norman Díaz, a popular exile and radio commentator, brought on board to present newscasts; Díaz stated at that time that the goal was an all-Spanish format. The station continued its English-language programming; for the fall 1969 television season, it picked up four network programs that the Miami ABC and NBC affiliates passed on and a package of 10 Floridians basketball games.

=== Spanish International purchase ===
In October 1970, Coastal filed to sell WAJA-TV to the Spanish International Communications Corporation (SICC), owner of three Spanish-language television stations in San Antonio (KWEX), Los Angeles (KMEX-TV), and the New York City area (WXTV), for $1,440,000. The sale closed in March 1971; SICC changed the call letters to WLTV, and except for a three-hour block of English-language syndicated shows in the late afternoon and a Sunday morning church service, all remaining English-language programming was dropped.

In 1971, WLTV and a nightly block of Mexican telenovelas and news on WCIX (channel 6) were the primary sources of Spanish-language television programming in Miami, as WPLG aired just one discussion program; WTVJ broadcast a weekly news roundup on Saturdays; and WCKT had dropped all of its programming in Spanish.

SIN became a satellite-interconnected network in 1976, and WLTV installed South Florida's first earth station to receive and broadcast satellite-delivered programming. Advertising revenue multiplied over a period of several years to $1.8 million in 1978; even though Miami was the eighth-largest market by population in SIN's stable, its comparatively affluent audience of middle-class Cubans made it the second-richest.

== News operation ==
WLTV presently broadcasts 23 hours, 55 minutes of locally produced newscasts each week. In addition, the station produces a 30-minute news program called El News Café, that airs weekdays at 11 a.m., and a public affairs program called Ahora en Nuestra Comunidad, which airs Saturday mornings on WLTV (at 11 a.m.) and Sunday mornings on sister station WAMI-DT (at 6 a.m.). The station also produces an hour-long newsmagazine show with anchor Ambrosio Hernandez that airs on Sundays at 11 a.m.

During the news department's early history, the station's late evening newscast was broadcast at 10 p.m., but was later moved to 11 p.m. after Univision began to carry programming at that hour. WLTV debuted weekday morning newscasts in 2001. On October 22, 2010, beginning with the 6 p.m. newscast, WLTV began broadcasting its local newscasts in high definition.

=== Notable former on-air staff ===
- Barbara Bermudo
- Myrka Dellanos – anchor/reporter
- Maggie Rodriguez – reporter
- Pamela Silva Conde

== Technical information ==
=== Subchannels ===
The station's signal is multiplexed:

Subchannels of WLTV-DT
Subchannel	Res.	Short name	Programming
23.1	720p	WLTV-DT	Univision
23.2	480i	JUSTICE	True Crime Network
23.3	480i	Nosey	Nosey
23.4	480i	MSGold	MovieSphere Gold
23.6	480i	ShopLC	Shop LC

Subchannel broadcast with MPEG-4 video

=== Analog-to-digital conversion ===
WLTV ended programming on its analog signal, on UHF channel 23, on June 12, 2009, the official date on which full-power television stations in the United States transitioned from analog to digital broadcasts under federal mandate. The station's digital signal relocated from its pre-transition UHF channel 24 to channel 23 for post-transition operations. All Univision-owned full-power television stations, including WLTV, officially added the "-DT" suffix to their call signs on June 23, 2009, eleven days after the completion of digital television transition.
