= WQBA =

Radio station in Miami

- Miami, Florida; United States
- Broadcast area: Miami metropolitan area
- Frequency: 1140 kHz

Programming
- Language: Spanish
- Format: News/talk
- Network: Radio Martí

Ownership
- Owner: Latino Media Network, LLC (sale pending to Newsmax Radio, LLC); (Latino Media Holdings II, LLC)
- Operator: Office of Cuba Broadcasting (U.S. Agency for Global Media)
- Sister stations: WAQI

History
- First air date: 1952 (as WMIE)
- Former call signs: WMIE (1948–1968)
- Call sign meaning: Cuba

Technical information
- Licensing authority: FCC
- Facility ID: 73912
- Class: B
- Power: 50,000 watts day; 10,000 watts night
- Transmitter coordinates: 25°46′4.4″N 80°29′9.2″W

Links
- Public license information: Public file; LMS
- Webcast: Listen live (via iHeartRadio)

WQBA (1140 AM) is a radio station broadcasting a Spanish-language news/talk format. Licensed to Miami, Florida, United States, the station is owned by Latino Media Network; under a local marketing agreement, it was operated by former owner TelevisaUnivision's Uforia Audio Network until 2024. It features programming from Radio Martí. Previous call letters were WMIE, owned by Susquehanna Broadcasting.

AM 1140 is a United States and Mexican clear-channel frequency on which XEMR-AM in Apodaca, Nuevo León, and WRVA in Richmond, Virginia, are the Class A stations. WQBA must reduce power and use a highly directional array during nighttime hours in order to prevent interference to the skywave signals of the Class A stations.

== History ==
In 1976, The Miami Herald stated that the station, which ran a news program presented by Emilio Milián, had the largest audience of any in the Miami metropolitan area.

WQBA, along with most of Univision Radio's news/talk stations, became part of the national Univision America network when it launched on July 4, 2012; some of its local programming was merged into sister station WAQI's lineup. On December 20, 2016, Univision announced that WQBA would be one of the charter affiliates of Univision Deportes Radio, its new Spanish-language sports radio network launched in April 2017.

WQBA was one of 18 radio stations that TelevisaUnivision sold to Latino Media Network in a $60 million deal announced in June 2022, approved by the Federal Communications Commission (FCC) that November, and completed on December 30, 2022. Under the terms of the deal, Univision agreed to continue programming the station for up to one year under a local marketing agreement.

Latino Media Network dropped TUDN Radio from WQBA and returned it to a local news/talk format–promoted as "El Pulso de Miami"–on August 12, 2024. Following financial losses and a lack of sponsors, on July 30, 2025, the Spanish news/talk programming was replaced by an unbranded Spanish soft adult contemporary music format.

In November 2026, Latino Media Network agreed to sell WQBA and WAQI to Newsmax, the first radio stations to be acquired by the conservative media company; WQBA was valued at $540,000. By the time of the deal, WQBA's programming had been turned over to the Office of Cuba Broadcasting's Radio Martí.
