= WSUA =

Spanish-language news/talk radio station in Miami

Coordinates: 25°46′22″N 80°25′16″W

- Miami, Florida; United States
- Broadcast area: South Florida
- Frequency: 1260 kHz
- Branding: America Radio Miami 1260 AM

Programming
- Language: Spanish
- Format: News/talk

Ownership
- Owner: Grupo Latino de Radio; (WSUA Broadcasting Corporation)

History
- First air date: 1958
- Former call signs: WMMA (1958); WAME (1958–1969); WWOK (1969–1980); WHTT (1980–1989)
- Call sign meaning: "Suave" (former format)

Technical information
- Licensing authority: FCC
- Facility ID: 55403
- Class: B
- Power: 50,000 watts day; 20,000 watts night
- Translator: 94.3 W232DX (Miami)

Links
- Public license information: Public file; LMS
- Website: www.americaradiomiami1260am.com

WSUA (1260 AM, "America Radio Miami 1260 AM") is a Spanish news-talk radio station in Miami, Florida. It is owned by Grupo Latino de Radio, a subsidiary of the Spanish media conglomerate PRISA. The station is styled along the lines of two big Latin American radio stations, Caracol Radio from Colombia (which the station previously used for its own branding) and W Radio from Mexico (which most of its programs are based on, like Hoy por hoy).

== History ==
From 1958 to 1969 the station at 1260 AM had the call letters WAME. Known as "Whammy in Miami", the station had a top 40 format (prior to the startup of WFUN), and was initially a daytimer. The station was popular with teenagers and young adults in the city in the early days of the rock 'n roll era, but faded in popularity once WFUN went on the air. The station changed formats, first to "Good Music" (easy listening), then to R&B, with noted Miami disc jockey Nickie "Nick With a Positive Kick" Lee. WAME was later sold to Mission East Company after that company divested itself of WRIZ in Coral Gables.

In 1969, it traded call signs with WWOK in Charlotte, North Carolina, and adopted a country music format. Mission East, added an FM signal, WIGL, which was partially simulcast for a time, and later became WJOK with a totally separate format.

In the early 1980s, the station was sold from Mission East to Metroplex Broadcasting, owners of top 40 WHYI-FM (Y-100). Call letters were changed to WHTT and the station broadcast a black oldies format, with emphasis on Motown and soul, and simulcast Y-100 overnights. The station shortly thereafter took on a Hispanic format with the call letters WHTT (Radio Hit). After the station was sold again, the call letters became WSUA, Radio Suave, and took on a ballad-oriented format, similar to that of the current Romantica on FM..

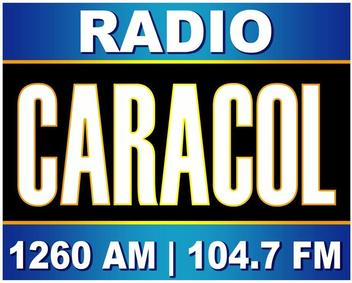
Former logo

As of April 2021, the station was being sold to America CV, but it was dismissed on April 12, 2022.
