= List of Blitzkrieg band members =

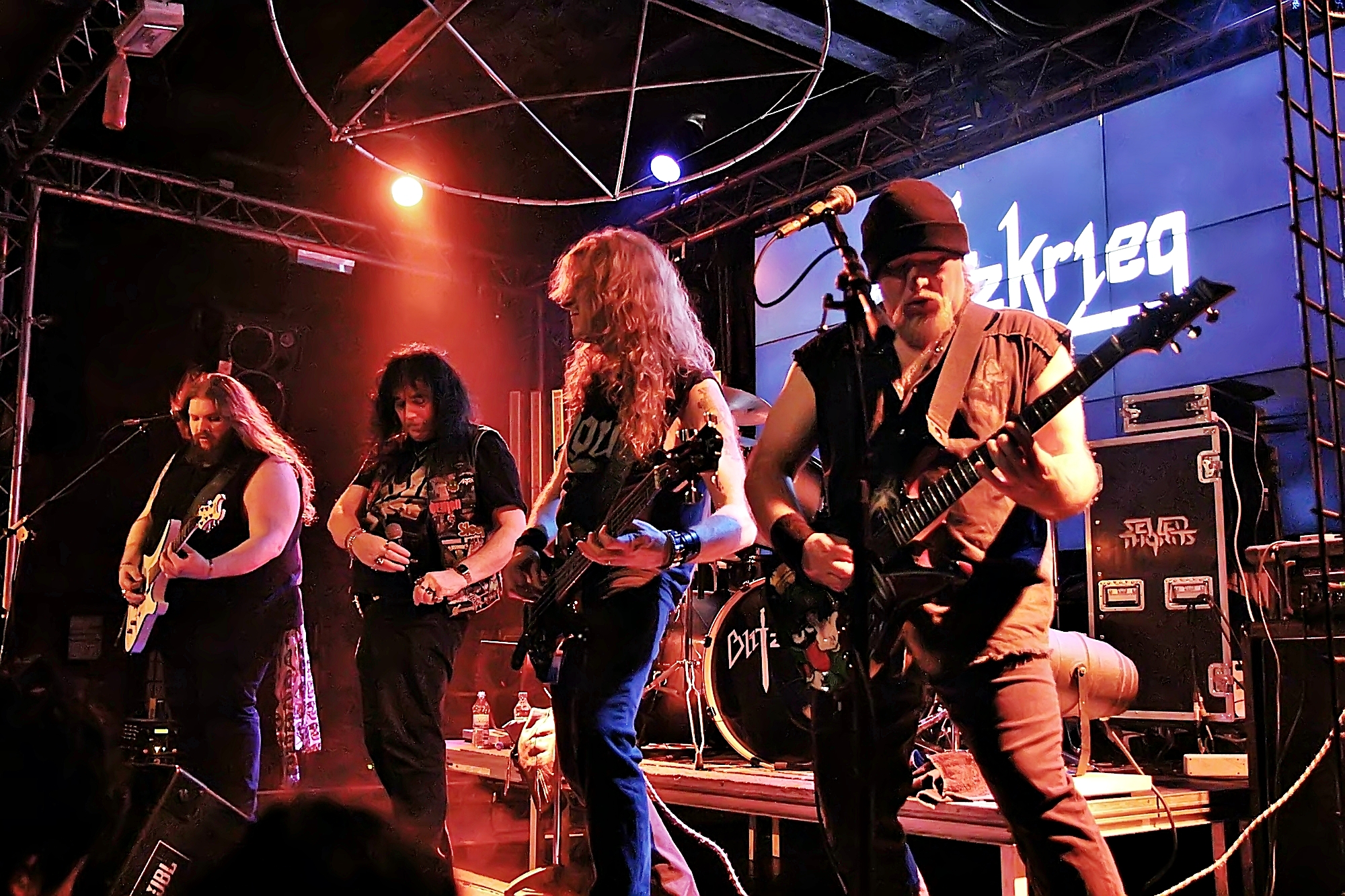
Blitzkrieg performing live in 2018.

Blitzkrieg are an English heavy metal band originally from Leicester. Formed in October 1980, the group originally consisted of vocalist Brian Ross, lead guitarist Jim Sirotto, rhythm guitarist Ian Jones, bassist Steve English and drummer Steve Abbey. The band have broken up and reformed multiple times since their formation and changed personnel on numerous occasions. The band's current incarnation includes constant member Ross alongside guitarist Alan Ross (the vocalist's son, a member since 2012), drummer Matt Graham (since 2015), bassist Liam Ferguson (since 2019) and guitarist Nick Jennison (since 2020).

== History ==
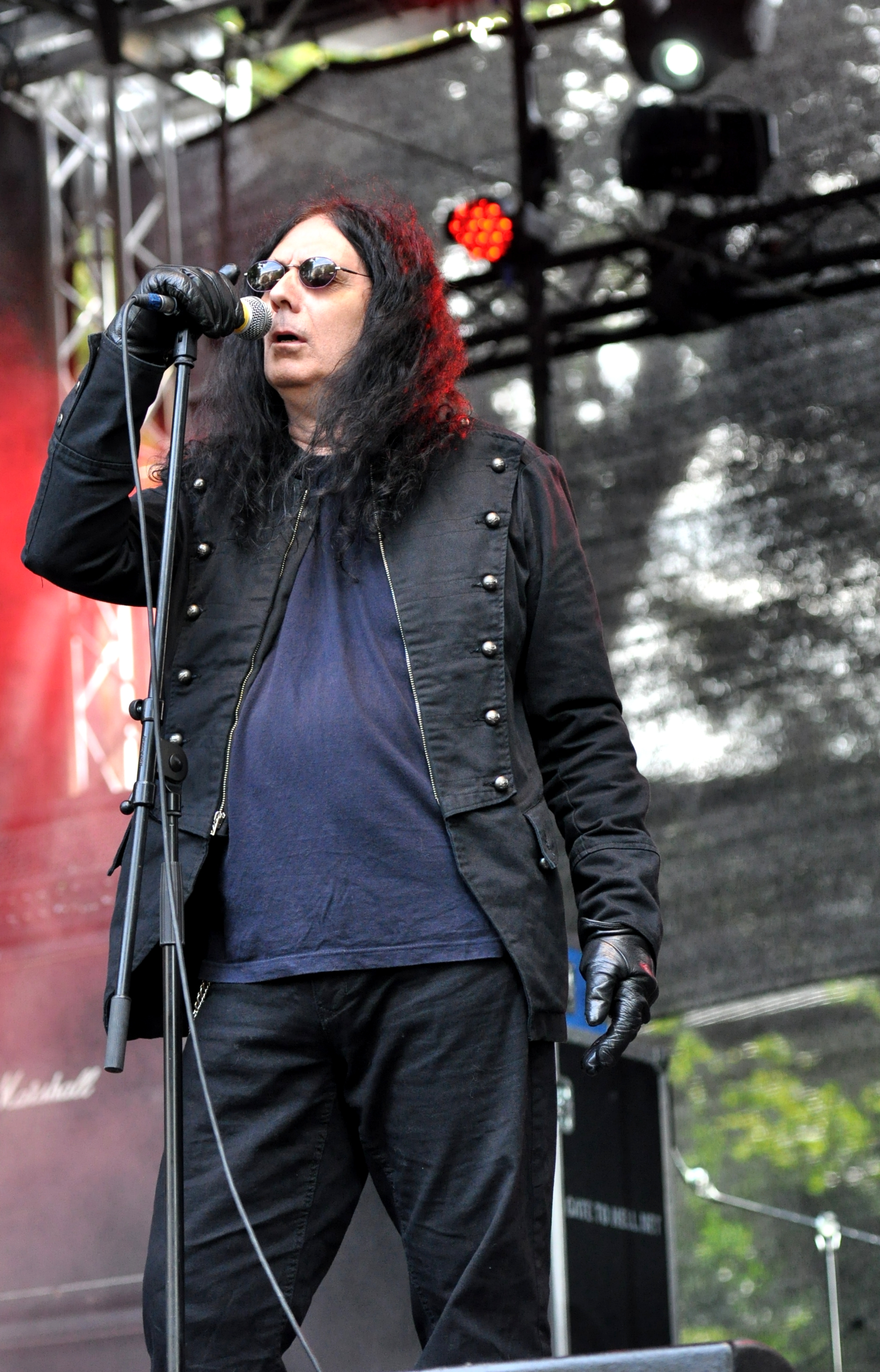
Brian Ross has fronted every lineup of Blitzkrieg since their formation in October 1980.

=== 1980–1985 ===
Blitzkrieg were formed in October 1980 by vocalist Brian Ross, lead guitarist Jim Sirotto, rhythm guitarist Ian Jones, bassist Steve English and drummer Steve Abbey. After an initial three-track demo, the band recorded their debut single "Buried Alive"/"Blitzkrieg" in February 1981. By the time of its release in May, English had been replaced by Mick Moore. This lineup released the live EP Blitzed Alive, before Jones was replaced by John Antcliffe in June 1981. The band continued touring throughout the year, before disbanding after a final show on 17 December 1981. According to Ross, the band decided to break up because Sirotto "decided he couldn't handle it", although another source has simply stated that "Antcliffe and Sirotto suddenly became disillusioned with the band". Prior to their breakup, Blitzkrieg recorded tracks for their intended full-length debut, which went unreleased until they were featured on the 2003 compilation A Time of Changes, Phase 1. Other previously unreleased recordings were issued in 2014 and 2015.

After spells in Avenger and Satan, Ross reformed Blitzkrieg in November 1984, bringing back guitarist Jim Sirotto and bassist Mick Moore (the latter of whom had also worked with him in Avenger), and adding guitarist Mick Procter (formerly of Tygers of Pan Tang) and drummer Sean Taylor (also of Satan). This lineup recorded the band's debut album A Time of Changes, before Sirotto and Taylor left again — the former as he still did not want to tour, the latter to return to Satan. For their first show since returning, on 3 May 1985, Ross, Procter and Moore were joined by second guitarist Chris Green and drummer Gav Taylor. This was the only show this lineup played, as Moore returned to Avenger, and Green and Procter both moved to London. Ross later claimed that the band were unable to tour after the album as he had "a problem with [his] voice".

=== 1986–1999 ===
Around a year later, Brian Ross and Blitzkrieg returned with a lineup including guitarists John "J. D." Biddle and Chris Beard, bassist Darren Parnaby, and drummer Sean Wilkinson. After a four-track demo, this incarnation also disbanded, with Ross joined by guitarists Glenn S. Howes and Steve Robertson, bassist Robbie Robertson, and drummer Kyle Gibson in 1988. This lineup also recorded a two-track demo, before Ross and Howes replaced the rest of the lineup with new guitarist Tony J. Liddle, bassist Glenn Carey and drummer Gary Young in 1989. With the new members, the band released Live at the Kazbah in 1990 and the EP 10 Years of Blitzkrieg in 1991, before Young was injured and the group consequently disbanded again.

In 1992, Ross and Liddle returned with new bassist Dave Anderson and returning drummer Sean Taylor, who recorded Unholy Trinity that year. The album was not released immediately, however, with the reactivated Neat Records issuing it in 1995. In 1996, Ross and Liddle recorded five new tracks released on the album Ten with guitarist Phil Miller, bassist Steve Ireland and drummer Paul White. Shortly after a tour with new drummer Neil Nattrass, the whole lineup was rebuilt with the return of guitarist Glenn S. Howes and the addition of new members Martin Richardson (guitar), Gav Gray (bass) and Mark Hancock (drums). Gray left the band before the recording of 1998's The Mists of Avalon, with Howes, Richardson and Hancock all contributing bass to the album's tracks. The band played a few shows in promotion of the album, before disbanding again around the summer of 1999 according to Howes. The shows featured guitarist Paul Nesbitt, bassist Gav Gray and drummer Mark Wyndebank.

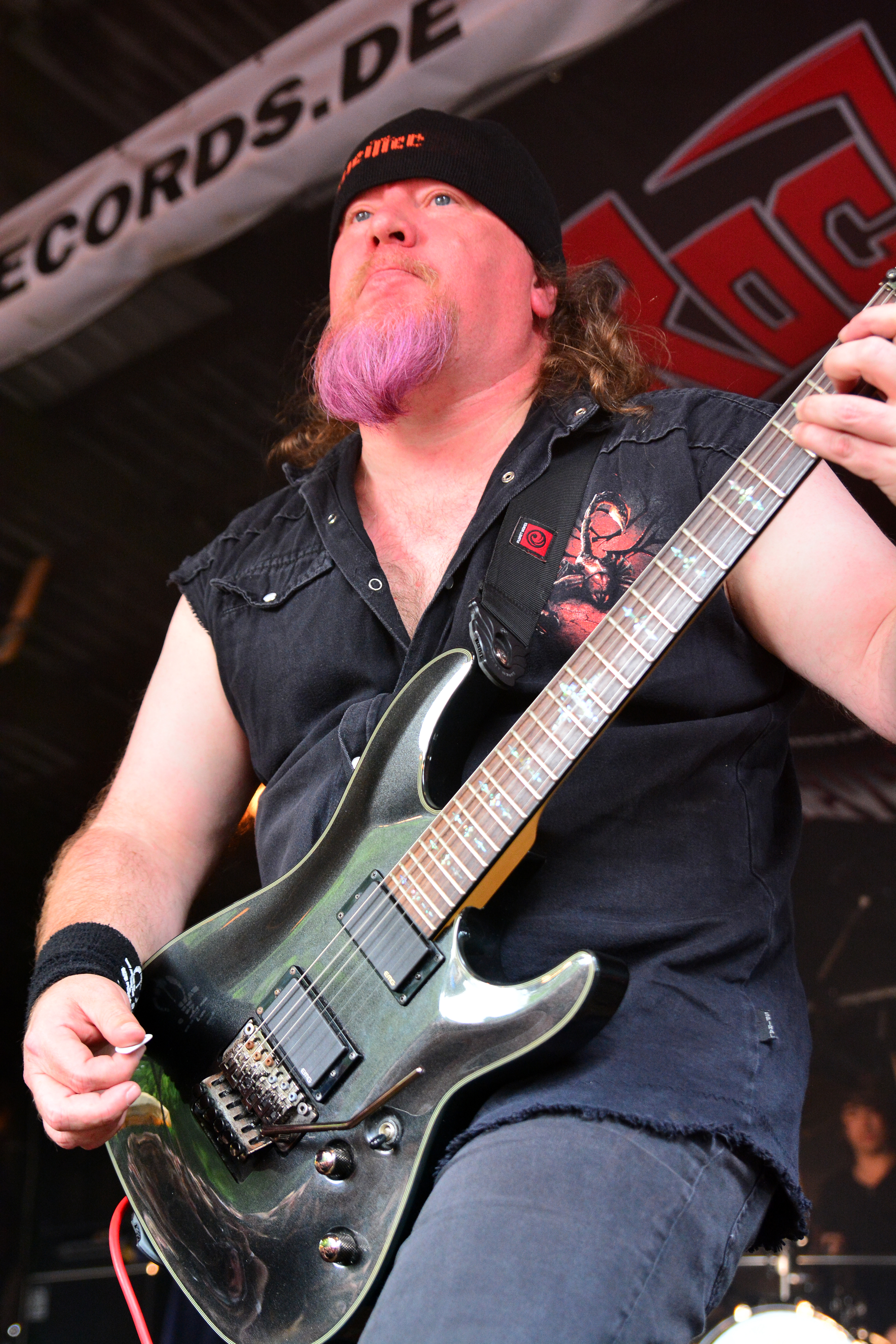
Guitarist Ken Johnson joined Blitzkrieg in 2002 and played with the band until 2019.

=== Since 2001 ===
Blitzkrieg reformed again in August 2001. Alongside Brian Ross and returning guitarists Tony J. Liddle and Paul Nesbitt, the band's new lineup was completed by bassist Andy Galloway and drummer Phil Brewis, who together released Absolute Power in 2002. Shortly after the album's release, Liddle was replaced by Ken Johnson. The new lineup toured throughout 2003, recording Absolutely Live during the shows, before Galloway was replaced by Paul Brewis in January 2004. Sins and Greed followed in 2005. In January 2006, Nesbitt left the band after becoming a father, with Guy Laverick taking his place. This lineup released Theatre of the Damned in 2007.

In July 2012, the Brewis brothers and Laverick were replaced by new guitarist Alan Ross (Brian Ross's son), bassist Bill Baxter and drummer Mick Kerrigan. According to Brian Ross, Paul Brewis left due to "problems in his personal life", while Laverick and Phil Brewis chose to focus on their other group Chaos Asylum. The new lineup released Back from Hell in 2013. Kerrigan left in March 2015, replaced by Matt Graham the next month. Later that year, the band released a 30th anniversary re-recording of their debut album A Time of Changes. In February 2017, Baxter was replaced by Huw Holding. Judge Not! was released in April 2018.

Blitzkrieg underwent two personnel changes in 2019: in March, Holding was replaced by Liam Ferguson, and in December, Ken Johnson left the band. Before Johnson's departure, the band released the EP Loud and Proud. The guitarist was replaced in February 2020 by Nick Jennison. In 2024, the band released a self-titled album.

== Members ==
=== Current ===
| Image | Name | Years active | Instruments | Release contributions |
|---|---|---|---|---|
| | Brian Ross | 1980–1981; 1984–1991; 1992–1994; 1996–1999; 2001–present | lead vocals; keyboards | all Blitzkrieg releases |
| | Alan Ross | 2012–present | guitar; backing vocals | all releases from Back from Hell (2013) to date, except The Boys from Brazil Street albums (2014/15) |
| | Matt Graham | 2015–present | drums | A Time of Changes (30th Anniversary Edition) (2015); Judge Not! (2018); Loud and Proud (2019); Blitzkrieg (2024) |
| | Liam Ferguson | 2019–present | bass | Loud and Proud (2019); Blitzkrieg (2024) |
| | Nick Jennison | 2020–present | guitar; backing vocals | Blitzkrieg (2024) |

=== Former ===
| Image | Name | Years active | Instruments | Release contributions |
|---|---|---|---|---|
| | Jim Sirotto | 1980–1981; 1984–1985 | lead guitar | all releases from Blitzkrieg I (1981) to A Time of Changes (1985); A Time of Changes, Phase 1 (2003); The Boys from Brazil Street: 1981 Revisited (The Archives Vol. One) (2014) and The Farm Tapes (The Archives Vol. Two) (2015) |
| | Steve Abbey | 1980–1981 | drums | Demo 15/16-11-80 (1980); "Buried Alive" (1981); Lead Weight (1981); Blitzed Alive (1981); A Time of Changes, Phase 1 (2003); The Boys from Brazil Street: 1981 Revisited (The Archives Vol. One) (2014) and The Farm Tapes (The Archives Vol. Two) (2015) |
| | Ian Jones | 1980–1981 (died 2009) | rhythm guitar | Demo 15/16-11-80 (1980); "Buried Alive" (1981); Lead Weight (1981); Blitzed Alive (1981); The Boys from Brazil Street: 1981 Revisited (The Archives Vol. One) (2014) |
| | Steve English | 1980–1981 | bass | Demo 15/16-11-80 (1980); "Buried Alive" (1981); Lead Weight (1981); The Boys from Brazil Street: 1981 Revisited (The Archives Vol. One) (2014) |
| | Mick Moore | 1981; 1984–1985 (died 2024) | bass | Blitzed Alive (1981); A Time of Changes (1985); A Time of Changes, Phase 1 (2003); The Boys from Brazil Street: 1981 Revisited (The Archives Vol. One) (2014) and The Farm Tapes (The Archives Vol. Two) (2015) |
| | John Antcliffe | 1981 | rhythm guitar | A Time of Changes Phase 1 (2003); The Boys from Brazil Street: The Farm Tapes (The Archives Vol. Two) (2015) |
| | Mick Procter | 1984–1985 | guitar | A Time of Changes (1985) |
| | Sean Taylor | 1984–1985; 1992–1994 | drums | A Time of Changes (1985); Unholy Trinity (1995) |
| | Chris Green | 1985 | guitar | none |
| | Gav Taylor | 1985 | drums | none |
| | John "J. D." Binnie | 1986–1987 | guitar | untitled 1986 demo |
| | Chris Beard | 1986–1987 | guitar | untitled 1986 demo |
| | Darren Parnaby | 1986–1987 | bass | untitled 1986 demo |
| | Sean Wilkinson | 1986–1987 | drums | untitled 1986 demo |
| | Glenn S. Howes | 1988–1991; 1997–1999 | guitar; backing vocals; bass (1998) | untitled 1988 demo; Live at the Kazbah (1990); 10 Years of Blitzkrieg (1991); Ten (1996); The Mists of Avalon (1998) |
| | Steve Robertson | 1988–1989 | guitar | untitled 1988 demo |
| | Robbie Robertson | 1988–1989 | bass | untitled 1988 demo |
| | Kyle Gibson | 1988–1989 | drums | untitled 1988 demo |
| | Tony J. Liddle | 1989–1991; 1992–1994; 1996–1997; 2001–2002 (died 2025) | guitar; backing vocals | Live at the Kazbah (1990); 10 Years of Blitzkrieg (1991); Unholy Trinity (1995); Ten (1996); Absolute Power (2002) |
| | Gary Young | 1989–1991 | drums | Live at the Kazbah (1990); 10 Years of Blitzkrieg (1991); Ten (1996) |
| | Glenn Carey | 1989–1991 | bass | Live at the Kazbah (1990); 10 Years of Blitzkrieg (1991) |
| | Dave Anderson | 1992–1994 | bass | Unholy Trinity (1995) |
| | Phil Miller | 1996–1997 | guitar | Ten (1996) |
| | Steve Ireland | 1996–1997 | bass | Ten (1996) |
| | Paul White | 1996 | drums | Ten (1996) |
| | Neil Nattrass | 1996–1997 | drums | none |
| | Martin Richardson | 1997–1998 | guitar; bass (1998) | The Mists of Avalon (1998) |
| | Mark Hancock | 1997–1998 | drums; bass (1998) | The Mists of Avalon (1998) |
| | Gav Gray | 1997–1998; 1998–1999 | bass | none |
| | Paul Nesbitt | 1998–1999; 2001–2006 | guitar | Absolute Power (2002); Absolutely Live (2004); Sins and Greed (2005) |
| | Mark Wyndebank | 1998–1999 | drums | none |
| | Phil Brewis | 2001–2012 | drums | Absolute Power (2002); Absolutely Live (2004); Sins and Greed (2005); Theatre of the Damned (2007) |
| | Andy Galloway | 2001–2004 | bass | Absolute Power (2002); Absolutely Live (2004) |
| | Ken Johnson | 2002–2019 | guitar; keyboards; backing vocals | all releases from Absolutely Live (2004) to Loud and Proud (2019), except The Boys from Brazil Street albums (2014/15) |
| | Paul Brewis | 2004–2012 | bass | Sins and Greed (2005); Theatre of the Damned (2007) |
| | Guy Laverick | 2006–2012 | guitar | Theatre of the Damned (2007) |
| | Bill Baxter | 2012–2017 | bass; backing vocals | Back from Hell (2013); A Time of Changes (30th Anniversary Edition) (2015) |
| | Mick Kerrigan | 2012–2015 | drums | Back from Hell (2013) |
| | Huw Holding | 2017–2019 | bass | Judge Not! (2018) |

== Lineups ==
| Period | Members | Releases |
|---|---|---|
| October 1980–spring 1981 | Brian Ross — vocals; Jim Sirotto — lead guitar; Ian Jones — rhythm guitar; Steve English — bass; Steve Abbey — drums | Blitzkrieg I demo (1981); "Buried Alive" (1981); Lead Weight ("Inferno") (1981); 1981 Revisited (2014) — 5 tracks |
| Spring–June 1981 | Brian Ross — vocals; Jim Sirotto — lead guitar; Ian Jones — rhythm guitar; Mick Moore — bass; Steve Abbey — drums | Blitzed Alive (1981); 1981 Revisited (2014) — 8 tracks |
| June–December 1981 | Brian Ross — vocals; Jim Sirotto — lead guitar; John Antcliffe — rhythm guitar; Mick Moore — bass; Steve Abbey — drums | A Time of Changes, Phase 1 (2003); The Farm Tapes (2015) |
Band inactive January 1982–October 1984
| November 1984–early 1985 | Brian Ross — vocals; Jim Sirotto — guitar; Mick Procter — guitar; Mick Moore — bass; Sean Taylor — drums | A Time of Changes (1985) |
| Spring/summer 1985 | Brian Ross — vocals; Mick Procter — guitar; Chris Green — guitar; Mick Moore — bass; Gav Taylor — drums | none |
| 1986–1987 | Brian Ross — vocals; J. D. Binnie — guitar; Chris Beard — guitar; Darren Parnaby — bass; Sean Wilkinson — drums | untitled four-track demo (1986) |
| 1988–1989 | Brian Ross — vocals; Glenn S. Howes — guitar; Steve Robertson — guitar; Robbie Robertson — bass; Kyle Gibson — drums | untitled two-track demo (1988) |
| 1989–1991 | Brian Ross — vocals; Glenn S. Howes — guitar; Tony J. Liddle — guitar; Glenn Carey — bass; Gary Young — drums | Live at the Kazbah (1990); 10 Years of Blitzkrieg (1991) |
Band inactive 1991–1992
| 1992–1994 | Brian Ross — vocals, keyboards; Tony J. Liddle — guitar; Dave Anderson — bass; Sean Taylor — drums | Unholy Trinity (1995) |
Band inactive 1994–1996
| 1996 | Brian Ross — lead vocals, keyboards; Tony J. Liddle — guitar, backing vocals; Phil Miller — guitar; Steve Ireland — bass; Paul White — drums | Ten (1996) |
| 1996–1997 | Brian Ross — lead vocals, keyboards; Tony J. Liddle — guitar, backing vocals; Phil Miller — guitar; Steve Ireland — bass; Neil Nattrass — drums | none |
| 1997–1998 | Brian Ross — lead vocals, keyboards; Glenn S. Howes — guitar, backing vocals; Martin Richardson — guitar; Gav Gray — bass; Mark Hancock — drums | none |
| 1998 | Brian Ross — lead vocals, keyboards; Glenn S. Howes — guitar, bass, backing vocals; Martin Richardson — guitar, bass; Mark Hancock — drums, bass | The Mists of Avalon (1998) |
| 1998–1999 | Brian Ross — lead vocals, keyboards; Glenn S. Howes — guitar, backing vocals; Paul Nesbitt — guitar; Gav Gray — bass; Mark Wyndebank — drums | none |
Band inactive 1999–2001
| August 2001–autumn 2002 | Brian Ross — lead vocals, keyboards; Tony J. Liddle — guitar, backing vocals; Paul Nesbitt — guitar; Andy Galloway — bass; Phil Brewis — drums | Absolute Power (2002) |
| Autumn 2002–January 2004 | Brian Ross — lead vocals, keyboards; Paul Nesbitt — guitar; Ken Johnson — guitar, backing vocals; Andy Galloway — bass; Phil Brewis — drums | Absolutely Live (2004) |
| January 2004–January 2006 | Brian Ross — lead vocals, keyboards; Paul Nesbitt — guitar; Ken Johnson — guitar, backing vocals; Paul Brewis — bass; Phil Brewis — drums | Sins of Greed (2005) |
| January 2006–July 2012 | Brian Ross — lead vocals, keyboards; Ken Johnson — guitar, backing vocals; Guy Laverick — guitar; Paul Brewis — bass; Phil Brewis — drums | Theatre of the Damned (2007) |
| July 2012–March 2015 | Brian Ross — lead vocals, keyboards; Ken Johnson — guitar, backing vocals; Alan Ross — guitar, backing vocals; Bill Baxter — bass, backing vocals; Mick Kerrigan — drums | Back from Hell (2013) |
| April 2015–February 2017 | Brian Ross — lead vocals, keyboards; Ken Johnson — guitar, backing vocals; Alan Ross — guitar, backing vocals; Bill Baxter — bass, backing vocals; Matt Graham — drums | A Time of Changes (30th Anniversary Edition) (2015) |
| February 2017–March 2019 | Brian Ross — lead vocals, keyboards; Ken Johnson — guitar, backing vocals; Alan Ross — guitar, backing vocals; Huw Holding — bass; Matt Graham — drums | Judge Not! (2018) |
| March–December 2019 | Brian Ross — lead vocals, keyboards; Ken Johnson — guitar, backing vocals; Alan Ross — guitar, backing vocals; Liam Ferguson — bass; Matt Graham — drums | Loud and Proud (2019) |
| February 2020–present | Brian Ross — lead vocals, keyboards; Alan Ross — guitar, backing vocals; Nick Jennison — guitar, backing vocals; Liam Ferguson — bass; Matt Graham — drums | Blitzkrieg (2024) |
