= List of British mariners =

Over the history of the British Merchant Navy, a number of mariners have become prominent due to actions or a subsequent career. Notable members of the British Merchant Navy have included:

== Officers ==
=== Captains ===
- James Bisset, Commodore of the Cunard Line, captained RMS Queen Mary and RMS Queen Elizabeth during World War II
- Joseph Conrad, author; Merchant Navy captain during the late 19th-century
- Herbert Haddock, first captain of RMS Titanic
- Stanley Lord, captain of SS Californian during the Titanic disaster
- Frederick Parslow, first Merchant Navy recipient of the Victoria Cross; captain of the HMHT Anglo-Calfornian when killed in U-boat attack
- Arthur Rostron, Commodore of the Cunard Line; captain of RMS Carpathia during the Titanic disaster
- Samuel Robinson, captain of the RMS Empress of Australia during the Great Kantō Earthquake
- Edward Smith, Captain of the RMS Titanic
- William Thomas Turner, last captain of the RMS Lusitania

=== General Officers ===
- Jameson Adams, Merchant navy officer, participant of the Nimrod expedition
- David Blair, original Second Officer of Titanic; officer of the watch during the HMS Oceanic grounding and sinking
- Joseph Boxhall, Titanic Fourth Officer; served in the Royal Navy during WWI
- Victoria Drummond, Marine engineer, first woman to serve as an officer in the British Merchant Navy
- Charles Lightoller, Titanic Second Officer; participated in the Dunkirk evacuation during WWII
- Harold Lowe, Titanic Fifth Officer; served in the Royal Navy during WWI and as an air raid warden during WWII
- William Murdoch, Titanic First Officer; died on the Titanic
- Herbert Pitman, Titanic Third Officer; merchant sailor in WWI and WWII
- James Moody, Titanic Sixth Officer; died on the Titanic
- Henry Wilde, Titanic Chief Officer; died on the Titanic

== Others ==
=== A ===
- Richard Armstrong (writer)
- April Ashley

=== B ===
- Warington Baden-Powell
- Charles George Baker
- Robert Barclay (statistician)
- Charley Barden
- Peter Baynham
- John Birmingham (politician)
- Kevin Black (broadcaster)
- Fred Blackburn (footballer)
- Chris Braithwaite
- Roy Chubby Brown
- Clive Burgess

=== C ===
- Earl Cameron
- Chris Canavan
- Juanita Carberry
- Duncan Carse
- John Clark, actor
- Dennis Coslett
- Nigel Cox (artist)
- Edward Coxere
- Lionel Crabb
- Gordon Crook

=== D ===
- Harry Daley
- Arthur Davidson (politician)
- Rupert Davies
- Richard Dawson
- Edward Dodd (police officer)
- George Drewry

=== E ===
- Steve Evets

=== F ===
- David Fergusson (psychologist)
- Maurice Flitcroft

=== G ===
- David Gay (British Army officer)
- Fernand Gravey

=== H ===
- Adrian Harbidge
- Jock Haston
- Brian Haw
- Robert Hichens, Quartermaster on Titanic
- Michael Holliday
- John Horner (British politician)
- Stan Hugill
- Gareth Hunt

=== J ===
- Michael Jackson, singer
- Brian Jacques
- Thomas Jones (Titanic survivor), sailor on Titanic

=== K ===
- Thomas Kelly (sailor)
- Jessie Kenney
- John Simpson Kirkpatrick
- Robin Knox-Johnston

=== L ===
- Reginald Robinson Lee, lookout on Titanic
- Basil Lubbock
- Trevor Lummis

=== M ===
- Craig Mackey
- Victor Maddern
- Sam McCluskie
- Mick McGinley
- Harry McNish
- William Mulholland

=== N ===
- Laurence Naismith, actor

=== O ===
- Tom Oliver
- Alfred Olliver, Quartermaster on Titanic
- Albert Owen

=== P ===
- Bryan Pearson, politician
- William Henry Pennington
- John Prescott

=== R ===
- Les Rackley, boxing trainer
- Jonathan Rees
- John Richardson (actor)
- George Roper
- George Thomas Rowe, Quartermaster on Titanic
- Ken Russell
- William Clark Russell

=== S ===
- George Samson
- Roger Scott
- Babulal Sethia
- George Sewell
- W. Morgan Sheppard
- Bill Stead
- Kenneth Stewart
- Roger Stott
- Peter Stringfellow
- George Symons, lookout on Titanic

=== T ===
- Ben Tillett

=== V ===
- Nicholas van Hoogstraten

=== W ===
- Frank Wild
- Alexander Wilson (English writer)
- Havelock Wilson
- Norman Wisdom
- Steven Wright, serial killer

== See also ==
- List of sailors
- List of American mariners
