= Elmo Tanner discography =

Discography of Elmo Tanner, an American whistler, singer, bandleader and disc jockey, best known for his whistling on the chart-topping song “Heartaches” with the Ted Weems Orchestra.

== as solo ==
=== singles ===
- “Dawn of Tomorrow” – Paramount 12561 (recorded August 1927)
- “Calling Me Home” (Gilbert – Monaco) – Paramount 12564 (recorded August 1927)
- “I'm Waiting For Ships That Never Come In” (Abe Olman – Jack Yellen) – Paramount 12569 (recorded August 1927)
- “Dear Old Girl” (Morse – Buck) – Paramount 12569 (recorded August 1927)
- “Song of Hawaii” (Bories – Corbel) – Paramount 12532 (recorded September 1927)
- “After I Called You Sweetheart” (Little – Grossman) – Paramount 12532 (recorded September 1927)
- “Sing Me a Baby Song” (Donaldson – Kahn) – Paramount 12533 (recorded September 1927)
- “So Blue” – Paramount 12533 (recorded September 1927)
- “C'est Vous” – Vocalion 15637 (recorded September 1927)
- “My Blue Heaven” (Donaldson – George Whiting) – Paramount 12563 (recorded October 1927)
- “Just Once Again” (Donaldson – Ash) – Paramount 12563 (recorded October 1927)
- “Marvelous” (Peter Derose – May Breen Singh) – Paramount 12570 (recorded October 1927)
- “Sweetheart of Sigma Chi” (Stokes – Vernon) – Paramount 12570 (recorded October 1927)
- “Girl of My Dreams” – Vocalion 15637 (recorded November 1927)
- “You Only Want Me When You're Lonesome” – Vocalion 15639 (recorded November 1927)
- “Tomorrow” – Vocalion 15639 (recorded November 1927)
- “Give Me a Night in June” (Cliff Friend) – Paramount 12564 (recorded November 1927)
- “Rain” – Vocalion 15649 (recorded January 17, 1928 Chicago)
- “Away Down South in Heaven” – Vocalion 15650
- “Does It Make Any Difference to You” – Vocalion 15650
- “Rainy Day Pal” – Vocalion 15651 (recorded January 17, 1928 Chicago)
- “So Tired” – Vocalion 15649 (recorded January 18, 1928 Chicago)
- “Four Walls” – Vocalion 15651 (recorded January 18, 1928 Chicago)
- “That’s How I Know I Love You” – Vocalion 15693 (recorded March 26, 1928 Chicago)
- “If I Can’t Have You” – Vocalion 15694
- “I Still Love You” – Vocalion 15694 (recorded June 29, 1928 Chicago)
- “Back In Your Own Back Yard” – Vocalion 15687 (recorded June 29, 1928 Chicago)
- “Remember Me” – Vocalion 15687 (recorded June 29, 1928 Chicago)
- “ Just Across the Street from Heaven” – Vocalion 15693 (recorded June 29, 1928 Chicago)
- “Don’t Wait Until the Lights are Low” – Vocalion 15711 (recorded July 20, 1928 Chicago)
- “Grieving” – Vocalion 15726 (recorded July 20, 1928 Chicago)
- “I’ve Lived All My Life Just for You” – Vocalion 15711 (recorded July 20, 1928 Chicago)
- “That Old Sweetheart of Mine” – Vocalion 15726 (recorded July 20, 1928 Chicago)
- “Jeannine, I Dream of Lilac Time” – Vocalion 15731 (recorded October 15, 1928 Chicago)
- “Sonny Boy” – Vocalion 15731 (recorded October 15, 1928 Chicago)
- “Because I Know You're Mine” – Vocalion 15744 (recorded November, 1928)
- “Once in a Lifetime” – Vocalion 15744 (recorded November, 1928)
- “Marie” (Irving Berlin) – Paramount 12720 (recorded November 1928)
- “My Old Girl's My New Girl Now” (Caesar – Friend) – Paramount 12720 (recorded November 1928)
- “Please Let Me Dream In Your Arms” – Paramount 12732 (recorded January 1929)
- “My Mother’s Eyes” – Paramount 12732 (recorded January 1929)
- “True Blue” – Paramount 12733 (recorded January 1929)
- “Who Do You Miss” – Paramount 12733 (recorded January 1929)
- “Out Where Moonbeams Are Born” – Vocalion 15814 (recorded July, 1929)
- “Now I’m in Love” – Vocalion 15814 (recorded July, 1929)
- “At Close of Day” – Vocalion 15825 (recorded July, 1929)
- “Ich Liebe Dich” – Vocalion 15825 (recorded July, 1929)
- “I Don't Want Your Kisses” – Vocalion 15829 (recorded July, 1929)
- “Sweetheart's Holiday” – Vocalion 15829 (recorded July, 1929)
- “Nobody’s Sweetheart” – MGM 10776
- “Every Time You Turn Me Down – MGM 10776
- “Whistling Paper Boy” – MGM 10886
- “Candy Lips” – MGM 10886
- “Tuscaloosa” (Schwartz – Fields) – MGM 10958A
- “My Angel” (Baron – Kanter – Malkin.) – MGM 10958B
- “Whispering” – Dot 15086
- “The Whistler and His Dog” – Dot 15086
- “Heartaches” – Dot 15112 (1953)
- “Nola” – Dot 15112 (1953)
- “Begin The Beguine” – Dot 15319 (1955)
- “Remembering” – Dot 15319 (1955)
- “Nightingale” – Dot 15411 (1955)
- “Avalon” – Dot 15411 (1955)

=== with David Carroll ===
==== albums ====
- Let's Dance (1958) – Mercury SR 60001/MG 20281

=== with Wayne King ===
==== singles ====
- “If I'm Dreaming” – Victor 22240

=== with Buddy Morrow ===
==== singles ====
- “Theme From "The Proud Ones"” – Wing 90079

=== with Jimmie Noone’s Apex Club Orch ===
==== singles ====
- “Virginia Lee” – Vocalion 1518 (recorded July 1, 1930 Chicago)
- “Little White Lies” – Vocalion 1531 (recorded August 23, 1930 Chicago)
- “Moonlight on the Colorado” – Vocalion 1531 (recorded August 23, 1930 Chicago)

=== with Jay Richards ===
==== singles ====
- “Sweetness” – Vocalion 15835 (recorded August 29, 1929 Chicago)

=== with Frank Sullivan ===
==== singles ====
- “An Old Guitar and an Old Refrain” – Vocalion 15648B

=== with Ted Weems ===
==== albums ====
- Dance Set (1952) – Mercury MG-25144
- Golden Favorites – Decca DL-4435

==== singles ====
- “Heartaches” – Bluebird B5131 (recorded August 4, 1933)
- “Lazy Weather” – Decca 822A (recorded May 15, 1936 Chicago)
- “Buffoon” (Zez Confrey) – Decca 1884B (recorded Feb. 23, 1938 New York City)
- “In My Little Red Book” – Decca 1695B (recorded Feb. 23, 1938 New York City)
- “Nola” (Felix Arndt) – Decca 2041 (recorded Feb. 23, 1938 New York City)
- “The Cute Little Hat-Check Girl” (Al Stillman – Ray Bloch – Nat Simon) – Decca 2019B (recorded Aug. 23, 1938 Los Angeles)
- “Heartaches” – Decca 2020, 25017 (recorded Aug. 23, 1938 Los Angeles)
- “Poor Pinocchio's Nose” – Decca 2408A (recorded Mar. 10, 1939 New York City)
- “The Young 'Uns Of The Martins And The Coys” – Decca 25286B (recorded Mar. 10, 1939 New York City)
- “The Chestnut Tree” – Decca 2380A (recorded Mar. 11, 1939 New York City)
- “I Love To Ride On A Choo-Choo Train” – Decca 2366B (recorded Mar. 11, 1939 New York City)
- “Moonlight” (Con Conrad) – Decca 3044A, 25105 (recorded Oct. 5, 1939 New York City)
- “Out Of The Night” (Harry Sosnik – Walter Hirsch) – Decca 3697A (recorded Jan. 27, 1941 New York City)
- “Rose Of The Rockies” – Decca 3828B (recorded Jan. 28, 1941 New York City)
- “Salud, Dinero y Amor” – Decca 3828A (recorded Jan. 28, 1941 New York City)
- “Having A Lonely Time” – Decca 4131 (recorded Dec. 9, 1941 Los Angeles)
- “Violets” (Green – Hill – Vallee) – Mercury 5052B
- “Mickey” (Moret – Williams) – Mercury 5062A (recorded May 1947)
- “The Martins and the Coys” (Cameron – Weems) – Mercury 5062A (recorded May 1947)
- “Sally Won’t You Come Back” – Mercury 5118 and it was Elmo's whistling that audiences most responded to.
- “Ciribiribin” – Mercury 5118
