= WHOT =

WHOT may refer to:

- WHOT (AM), a radio station (1590 AM) licensed to serve Palm River-Clair Mel, Florida, United States
- WHOT-FM, a radio station (101.1 FM) licensed to serve Youngstown, Ohio, United States
- WHOT-TV, a television station (channel 17, virtual 66) licensed to serve Opelika, Alabama, United States
- WUVG-DT, a television station (channel 18, virtual 34) licensed to serve Athens, Georgia, United States, which held the call sign WHOT-TV from 1999 to 2001
- WNIO, a radio station (1390 AM) licensed to serve Youngstown, Ohio, United States, which held the call sign WHOT from 1990 to 1994
- WGFT, a radio station (1330 AM) licensed to serve Campbell, Ohio, United States, which held the call sign WHOT from 1955 to 1990
- WDND (1490 AM), a radio station licensed to serve South Bend, Indiana, United States, which held the call sign WHOT from 1944 to 1955
