= Beat the Band (quiz show) =

Musical quiz show heard on NBC radio (1944-1944)

- Ted Weems and his orchestra, with Perry Como, Marilyn (Marvel) Maxwell and Elmo Tanner, 1940
- Genre: Music and Quiz
- Country of origin: United States
- Language: English
- Home station: NBC
- Starring: Garry Moore (1940-1943); Ted Weems and his orchestra (1940-1941); Hildegarde (1943-1944); Harry Sosnick Band (1941-1944); Eddie Mayehoff (1944)
- Announcer: Marvin Miller; Tom Shirley; Fort Pearson
- Recording studio: Chicago (1940-1943); New York (1943-1944)
- Original release: 28 January 1940 – 6 September 1944
- Opening theme: Out of the Night

Beat the Band is a musical quiz show heard on NBC radio from 1940 to 1944 in two distinctly different series. The program popularized the show business catch phrase, "Give me a little traveling music", often uttered on TV a decade later by Jackie Gleason.

== 1940–1941 ==
In the first series, broadcast on Sundays at 6:30 p.m. from Chicago, emcee Garry Moore read music-related questions submitted by listeners to band members in the 14-piece Ted Weems Orchestra. Originally sponsored by the General Mills cereal Kix, listeners whose questions were used on the air received $10; those who stumped the band received $20 and a case of Kix. Questions were often posed in the form of puns or riddles. such as, "Suppose a small fur-bearing animal gets so angry he explodes. What song title is suggested?" The answer from comedian-violinist Red Ingle, "Pop Goes the Weasel." Band members who answered questions incorrectly had to toss a fifty-cent piece on the bass drum. The musician with the most correctly answered questions at the end of the program took home the bass drum "kitty". Unlike most radio shows of the time, Beat the Band did not always originate in Chicago; the program was often broadcast on location from places like Denver, St. Louis, and Milwaukee.

The program's vocalists were Perry Como, Parker Gibbs and Marvel Maxwell. Other cast members included Country Washburn and Elmo Tanner, the Whistling Troubador. Fort Pearson was the announcer. This series aired from January 28, 1940, to February 23, 1941.

== 1943–1944 ==
Relocating to New York as a summer replacement for Red Skelton's The Raleigh Cigarette Program, the program began anew on June 15, 1943, with Raleigh Cigarettes as the sponsor (until June 1944). Music was supplied by the Harry Sosnik band. The first host of the second series was Hildegarde. After June 1944, the host was Eddie Mayehoff. The program came to an end on September 6, 1944.

Announcers were Marvin Miller and Tom Shirley. The program's theme music was "Out of the Night," composed by Harry Sosnik; and Walter Hirsch. The first version of this theme was by Weems and Hildegarde. The second version was performed by Sosnik.

Music was the basis for several quiz shows, such as Kay Kyser's Kollege of Musical Knowledge. In 2001, Soundcraft issued a compact disk of transcripts for some of the 1940 episodes of the show.
