= WHSR =

WHSR may refer to:

- White House Situation Room
- WTPA (AM), a radio station in Pompano Beach, Florida, United States, which used the call sign WHSR from 1997 to 2021
