= List of American mariners =

Notable members of the United States Merchant Marine have included:

- Jim Bagby Jr. – Major League Baseball pitcher
- Raymond Bailey – actor
- Alvin Baldus – former Democratic member of Congress
- Nathaniel Bowditch – author
- L. Brent Bozell Jr. – conservative activist and Catholic writer
- Lenny Bruce – comedian and poet
- Gordon Canfield – Republican congressman from New Jersey
- Alfonso J. Cervantes – forty-third Mayor of Saint Louis, Missouri
- Granville Conway – public servant, Presidential Medal for Merit recipient
- Harvey Cox – preeminent theologian and professor at Harvard Divinity School
- Joseph Curran – labor leader
- Richard Henry Dana Jr. – author
- Deborah Doane Dempsey – first American female master to command a cargo ship sailing internationally
- Dan Devine – football coach
- Peter Falk – actor
- Eric Fleming – actor
- James Garner – actor
- Allen Ginsberg – poet
- Seamon Glass – actor and author
- Harry Guardino – actor
- Woody Guthrie – musician
- David Hackworth – retired United States Army colonel and prominent military journalist
- Sterling Hayden – actor and author
- Chuck Hayward – actor and stuntman
- Don Hewitt – television news producer and executive
- Chuck Hicks – actor and stuntman
- Sadie O. Horton – female mariner who spent World War II working aboard a coastwise U.S. Merchant Marine barge, and posthumously received official veteran’s status for her wartime service in 2017, becoming the first recorded female Merchant Marine veteran of World War II.
- Cisco Houston – folk singer
- Richard Jaeckel – actor
- Cornelius Johnson – Olympic medal-winning high jumper
- Irving Johnson – author, adventurer and sail training pioneer
- John Paul Jones – naval officer
- Joseph Michael Kelly - Architect and Engineer
- Mark E. Kelly - NASA astronaut, test pilot and US senator
- Jack Kerouac – author
- Daniel Keyes – author and professor
- Joseph Stanley Kozlowski, AB – portrait and watercolor artist
- Leonard LaRue – naval officer who saved 14,000 lives during the Korean War
- Jack London – author
- Louis L'Amour – author
- Jack Lord – actor
- Jerry Marcus – cartoonist of comic strip Trudy
- Steve McQueen – actor
- Herman Melville – author
- Ray Montgomery – actor
- Hugh Mulzac – master mariner and civil rights activist
- James Nachtwey – photojournalist and war photographer
- Lloyd Nolan – actor
- George H. O'Brien Jr. – Medal of Honor recipient in Korean War
- Jeremiah O'Brien – captain of the privateer Unity in the first battle of the Revolutionary War
- Carroll O'Connor – actor
- Jack Paar – created TV talk show; was replaced by Johnny Carson
- Mary Patten (1837–1861) – only woman to take command of a clipper ship after the captain was incapacitated
- Donn Pearce – author and journalist
- Richard Phillips – held hostage by pirates and later rescued
- Richard Scott Prather – mystery novelist
- Denver Pyle – actor
- Bill Raisch – actor, stuntman, dancer and acting coach
- Joseph Resnick – Democratic congressman from New York
- Nelson Riddle – bandleader, arranger and orchestrator
- Cliff Robertson – actor and aviator, portrayed John F. Kennedy in PT-109
- Ernie Schroeder – comic book artist
- Otto Scott – journalist and author
- Hubert Selby Jr. – author
- Frank Sinkwich – 1942 Heisman Trophy winner
- Gary Snyder – poet
- Joseph D. Stewart – Vice Admiral, Superintendent of the United States Merchant Marine Academy
- Montfort Stokes – Democratic Senator
- Oliver Stone – three-time Academy Award-winning film director and screenwriter
- Celia Sweet – first female pilot in San Diego Bay, 1912
- Paul Teutul Sr. – founder of Orange County Choppers motorcycle manufacturer
- Jim Thorpe – Olympic athlete
- Eliza Thorrold – licensed tugboat master, San Francisco Bay, 1897
- Mark Twain (born Samuel Clemens) – author; inland waters
- Dave Van Ronk – folk singer nicknamed the "Mayor of MacDougal Street"
- Clint Walker – actor
- Jack Warden – actor
- John S. Watson – New Jersey politician
- Ted Weems – bandleader and musician
- Carlia Wescott – first American woman to be granted marine engineer's license, 1922
- Haskell Wexler – Academy Award-winning cinematographer, director, producer and screenwriter
- Nedd Willard (born 1928) – writer, artist, journalist
- Andy Williams – singer
- Charles Williams – writer of hardboiled crime fiction
- Robin Wilson – science fiction author and editor, and former President of California State University, Chico
- Charles Armijo Woodruff – 11th Governor of American Samoa

== See also ==
- List of sailors
- List of British sailors
