= Red Ingle =

American musician (1906–1965)

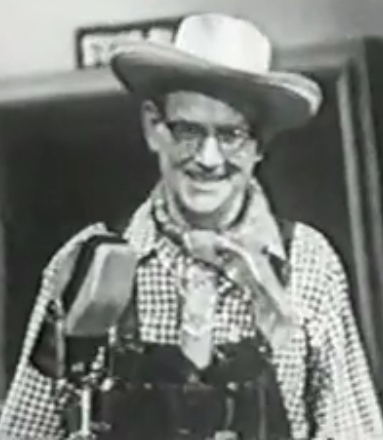
- Red Ingle performing his 1947 hit, "Tim-Tayshun" in 1960 on Startime.

Background information
- Also known as: "Red" Ingle
- Born: Ernest Jansen Ingle; November 7, 1906; Toledo, Ohio, US
- Died: September 6, 1965 (aged 58) Santa Barbara, California, US
- Genre: Comedy
- Occupations: singer musician songwriter
- Instruments: violin tenor saxophone clarinet
- Years active: 1921–1960's
- Formerly of: Red Ingle and his Natural Seven; Ted Weems; Spike Jones & His City Slickers

Ernest Jansen "Red" Ingle (November 7, 1906 – September 6, 1965) was an American musician, singer and songwriter, arranger, cartoonist and caricaturist. He is best known for his comedy records with Spike Jones and his own Natural Seven sides for Capitol.

== Personal life ==
Ingle was born in Toledo, Ohio, on November 7, 1906. He was taught basic violin from age five by Fritz Kreisler, a family friend. However at 13, he took up the saxophone, and that instrument later became his main instrument. Ingle received a music scholarship and studied at the Toledo American College of Music, playing classical music on a concert level. Ingle was also influenced by the country fiddlers he had heard; he was able to play their songs in their style as well as the classics in a traditional pose. At 15 he was playing professionally with Al Amato, and by his late teens, Ingle was touring steadily with the Jean Goldkette Orchestra, along with future jazz legends Bix Beiderbecke and Frankie Trumbauer. A graduate of Toledo's Scott High School, at one time he intended to become a teacher. Ingle left the College of Music in 1926 to become a full-time musician when he married Edwina Alice Smith. He joined Ted Weems' Orchestra in 1931, after briefly being a bandleader himself, and working under Maurice Sherman. His work with Weems was such a success that they worked together into the 1940s. Singer Perry Como later called Ingle 'one of the most talented men I've ever met.'

A pilot since 1924, Ingle wrote the Army Air Forces "I've Got Wings" manual as part of his wartime work at the Civil Aeronautics Administration. A talented leather carver whose saddles were in demand by celebrities, he also taught the skill in Veterans' hospitals during this time. One of Ingle's carved saddles was on exhibit at the Golden Gate International Exposition World's fair in San Francisco in 1939: a saddle carved with images illustrating the history of the state of California.

Ingle's son, Don, followed his father into the music business in 1949.

== The City Slickers ==
After he failed an eye test for the Air Force, he returned to music with Spike Jones & His City Slickers, where his comedic talents and flair for vocal effects found a welcoming home. Jones started featuring him as a frontman immediately, and Ingle's stage presence helped transform the City Slickers' stage act into something more visual than before.

With Ingle's input, the band gradually became a complete stage package that would eventually peak (after his departure in 1946) in the late 1940s and early 1950s with the successful Musical Depreciation Revue.

"There was nobody in the band as funny as Red," said Zep Meissner, the band's clarinetist; "guys like him were funny in themselves, they didn't need material."

An example of his routine appears in the film Bring on the Girls, where he takes off the vaudeville song "Chloe." He would run on in a frightwig, combat boots and a nightgown, while waving a lantern, climaxing the song with the cry "I gotta go!" as he dived into an outhouse. A record of this song went gold for the band, spending four weeks in the top ten. He was also the featured vocalist on other City Slickers hits, such as "You Always Hurt the One You Love", "Liebestraum" and "Glow Worm" – this last being featured in the film Breakfast in Hollywood, one of many films featuring the band.

== The Natural Seven ==
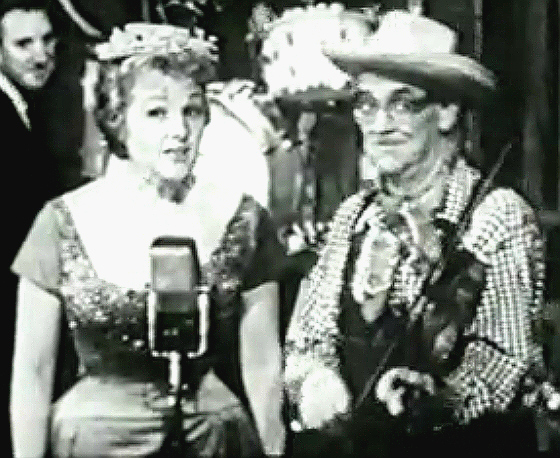
Jo Stafford as Cinderella G. Stump and Ingle performing their 1947 hit, "Tim-Tayshun", on Startime in 1960.

Ingle left Jones and the City Slickers in November 1946 after a salary dispute. He drifted through Radio and Hollywood, even working in light opera, until he made "Tim-Tayshun", a spoof recording of the then-popular Perry Como hit "Temptation", with Jo Stafford (under the name "Cinderella G. Stump") for Capitol Records in 1947. As the single went on to sell three million copies, Ingle formed a new band – Red Ingle and His Natural Seven; the group included several former City Slickers, among them Country Washburn, who had arranged "Tim-Tayshun". The band had several more hits, including "Cigareets, Whuskey, and Wild, Wild Women", "Them Durn Fool Things," and "'A', You're a Dopey Gal." "Cigareets" became a global million selling hit , despite being banned from radio airplay by all major networks.

After "Tim-Tayshun's" success, Ingle had a follow-up in mind: a take-off on the classical works of Paganini, but doing this required a violinist who was trained in classical music. Knowing that any direct requests for a classical performer would be refused, Ingle dreamed up his own "classical" ensemble: "Ernest Ingle's Miniature Symphony". A concert violinist responded and was quickly signed to a recording contract for the intended record. When the musician was shown the arrangement he was to play, he protested and attempted to leave without performing. Ingle and his band quickly reminded the violinist of the legality of the contract he had just signed. A deal was struck to get "Pagan Ninny's Keep 'Er Going Stomp" recorded: the concert performer was allowed to use a pseudonym on the record.

Ingle and his Natural Seven also performed with Grand Ole Opry performers such as Minnie Pearl and other Opry notables. He joined Jo Stafford on her 1949 tour of the Midwest. Despite the comedy emphasis, the quality of the musicianship was often outstanding, including in some cases Les Paul or Western Swing performers Tex Williams and steel guitarist Noel Boggs. The band also recorded short films of their numbers, before disbanding in 1952; by 1956, Ingle had formed the band once again.

== Retirement from music ==
After working again with Weems, Ingle eased out of music, tiring of touring. He reunited with Jo Stafford in 1960 for a performance of "Tim-Tayshun" on Startime; by this time he had lost a great deal of weight and was barely recognizable as the former leader of the Natural Seven. He also had a reunion with Perry Como; band leader Ted Weems and former fellow band members Ingle, Elmo Tanner, Parker Gibbs and "Country" Washburn appeared as guests on Como's Kraft Music Hall on October 18, 1961. There was one last reunion with Spike Jones, an album called Persuasive Concussion (satirizing the then-popular Persuasive Percussion albums). It was never completed; Jones died in 1965. Ingle also died the same year of an internal hemorrhage. Excerpts from Persuasive Concussion, featuring Ingle, were issued on LP in the 1970s (The Very Best of Spike Jones, on the United Artists label).

Ingle said he had been trying to retire from the music business since 1942; he signed up with Spike Jones a year later, and that his leaving the band in 1946 was another try at retirement. By 1948 he described himself as being resigned to staying in the field.

Ingle died September 6, 1965, in Santa Barbara, California and was buried in Ovid, Michigan.
