= Michael Jackson (English singer) =

British singer (born 1964)

- Born: 1964 (age 61–62); Lancaster, Lancashire, England
- Genres: Heavy metal, rock
- Occupation: Singer

Michael Jackson is a British singer who was lead vocalist with the heavy metal band Satan/Pariah.

== Early life ==
Jackson was born in Lancaster, Lancashire in 1964 to parents Estelle and Michael Jackson. He was brought up by his mother in Morecambe, Lancashire from an early age. A fanatical Queen fan Jackson dreamed of being a rock singer like his idol Freddie Mercury. Entering the Merchant Navy straight from school he spent five years sailing all over the world while singing with the band Rough Edge between assignments.

== Satan/Pariah ==
Eventually he decided to answer an advertisement, learned the required songs and travelled to London for his audition with the band Satan. After a successful interview at Clink Studios, Tower Bridge, London he moved there to join Satan, replacing Brian Ross.

The first recordings with Satan later became the EP "Into the Future" which was well received by the press, leading to a deal with Steamhammer Records, Germany. In between recordings the band toured Europe, mainly the Netherlands, which culminated in their appearance at the first Dynamo Open Air Festival in 1986. He has fond memories of this festival, especially meeting Angel Witch and Laaz Rocket. Satan were later to tour with Angelwitch in 1987. The first full album, "Suspended Sentence" was released in 1987 and toured Europe with Running Wild to promote it.

At this point, Satan realised they were creating the wrong impression with their band name. During their tour with Running Wild religious groups would gather outside venues burning tour T-shirts. After much deliberation the band decided to change their name to Pariah.

Jackson's next album with Pariah was "The Kindred". It was released in 1987 but Jackson was never a big fan of the songs and always felt they could have produced something better. At this point touring dates dried up and he was feeling a little despondent with the way things were going. Having become friends with the band Sabbat and wanting to keep busy Jackson roadied for Sabbat during their first UK tour along with bandmates Graeme English and Steve Ramsey (who was the tour manager). It was a fun tour and the band realised it was time to write a much more versatile album so began working on what he later came to realise was the best piece of work the band ever produced.

"Blaze of Obscurity" was (like "The Kindred") recorded in Germany and released in 1989 to a KKKKK review in Kerrang magazine and fantastic reviews across publications throughout Europe. Despite the critical acclaim Jackson left the band towards the end of 1989.

=== Reason for leaving ===
Many fans were surprised that Jackson left the band at such a time.

"After the release of "Blaze of Obscurity" I felt the band had produced a truly great album. We toured Germany to promote the album and recorded a live concert that was to be released plus a video for Blaze. At this time we were introduced to Japanese label Metal Mania who confirmed they would not only be releasing "Blaze of Obscurity" but also the band's back catalogue of music in Japan. An American publishing deal was also mentioned and the band were extremely excited about their future. Unfortunately, as time went by it was obvious that, due to the lack of a strong management team, these new avenues for the band were just fading away. A new album was mentioned but I felt it was time to go home to Morecambe to clear my head and make a decision as to what to do next. I decided against returning to the band as the disappointment in the events surrounding Blaze were too much and I felt the record company we were with was just not strong enough. If the record company couldn't break Blaze into the marketplace then what chance would another album make under the same company banner? I have been asked over the years why I left and that's basically it. We made great records yet were still knocking at closed doors. Mike Jackson"

=== Post-Pariah ===
Jackson joined local groups "The All Stars" and "The Minstrels of Power" for a while. Jackson moved into the cabaret circuit and has spent the following years as part of a Blues Brothers tribute, DJ, karaoke host and solo act.

== Personal life ==
Jackson met his wife Sharon in 1990; they married in 1994 and have two children.
