= WWNN =

Radio station in Pompano Beach, Florida, United States

- Pompano Beach, Florida; United States
- Broadcast area: Fort Lauderdale - West Palm Beach
- Frequency: 1470 kHz
- Branding: Radio Shekinah International

Programming
- Language: Haitian Creole
- Format: Christian radio

Ownership
- Owner: Shekinah Radio International, LLC

History
- First air date: April 4, 1959; 67 years ago
- Former call signs: WPOM (1959–1963); WRBD (1963–1997)
- Call sign meaning: Winners News Network (former branding)

Technical information
- Licensing authority: FCC
- Facility ID: 73930
- Class: B
- Power: 30,000 watts day; 2,500 watts night
- Transmitter coordinates: 26°10′49.0″N 80°13′14.0″W

Links
- Public license information: Public file; LMS

WWNN (1470 kHz) is a radio station licensed to Pompano Beach, Florida, United States, and serving Fort Lauderdale and West Palm Beach. The station is owned by Shekinah Radio International, LLC, and known as Radio Shekinah International.

By day, WWNN is powered at 30,000 watts. It uses a directional antenna with a four-tower array to avoid interfering with stations in the Miami area on 1450 and 1490 kHz. At night, to further reduce interference to other stations, the power is reduced to 2,500 watts. The transmitter is on NW 44th Street, near Florida's Turnpike, in Tamarac.

The 1470 frequency has had a varied history, being built in 1959 as WPOM by Gold Coast Broadcasters. It changed its call sign to WRBD in 1963 and oriented itself toward the Black community in Broward County and was the market's first Black-owned station. Citing low ratings and competition from FM outlets, its owners sold it in 1997 to Howard Goldsmith. Goldsmith moved the "Winners News Network" format of health talk and personal motivation programming from the previous WWNN at 980 kHz. Beasley Broadcast Group retained the format when it acquired the station in 2000; in 2019, when two of its sister stations were sold, WWNN took on the financial talk programming previously heard on WSBR (740 AM). Beasley sold WWNN in 2022, marking the first of five sales in two years; in one transaction, the station's two associated FM translators were separated. Shekinah Radio acquired WWNN in 2023.

== History ==
=== WPOM ===
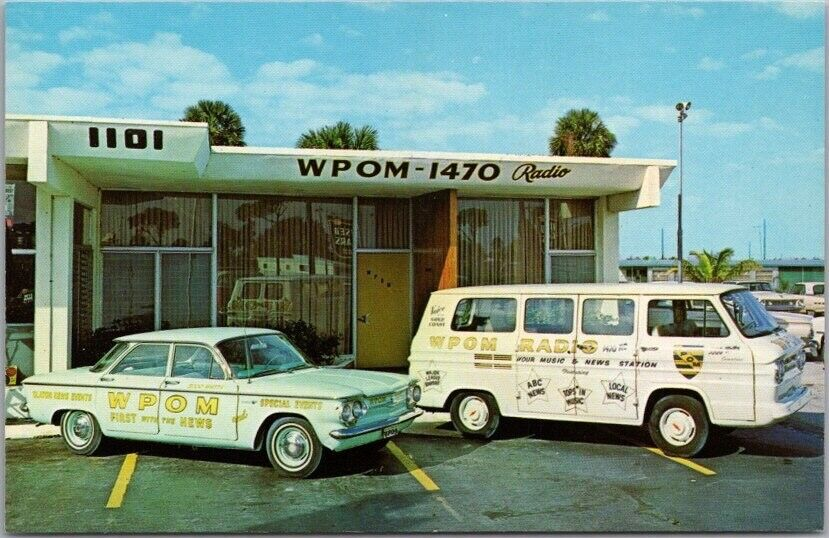
WPOM studio and vehicles, c. 1961–1963

In 1958, Gold Coast Broadcasters was granted a construction permit from the Federal Communications Commission (FCC) It was given the call sign WPOM. The daytime-only station signed on the air on April 4, 1959. Almardon, Inc., acquired WPOM in 1961, and the station became an ABC radio affiliate.

=== WRBD ===
In May 1963, WPOM became WRBD ("Radio Broward"). The studios were on Rock Island Road in Tamarac. Four months later, WRBD became the first radio station in Broward County oriented to the local African American community. It featured South Florida radio legends like Joe Fisher, "The Crown Prince" and "The Mad Hatter".

WRBD's Radio Broward designation turned into "Rockin' Big Daddy" as the format changed. A similarly formatted FM sister station, the mostly automated WRBD-FM 102.7, launched in December 1969. It became WCKO in 1971, playing disco music, and remained Black-oriented throughout the 1970s. The pair became charter affiliates of the Mutual Black Network in 1972.

Rose Broadcasting acquired WRBD and WCKO for $2 million in 1978. The new owners flipped the disco-formatted FM to album-oriented rock as "K-102" the next year, to reduce overlap between the two stations' target markets.

Rose owned the two stations until their acquisition by Sconnix Broadcasting in 1985, a $7 million deal. Sconnix replaced WCKO's rock format with adult contemporary as WMXJ that March. In 1986, an investor group led by John Ruffin, a Black supermarket executive, acquired the AM station from Sconnix for $2 million; the sellers retained WMXJ. WRBD thus became the first Black-owned radio station in South Florida. The split resolved a culture clash between the mostly Black AM staff and the white FM staff, much of which Sconnix had imported from other markets the year prior; Ruffin renovated the neglected studios. By 1991, however, facing financial difficulties and heavy competition from FM stations, WRBD had filed for Chapter 11 bankruptcy protection.

James Thomas ("James T") and Jerry Rushin bought the station from Ruffin in 1992.

=== WWNN ===
Logo as "WNN"

In 1997, citing competition from FM stations that were obtaining higher ratings, WRBD's ownership, including Rushin, sold the station to Howard Goldsmith, owner of WSBR (740 AM) and WWNN (980 AM). Rushin then went on to become the general manager of WEDR (99.1 FM). James T had been a DJ on WRBD early in his career. The health talk and motivational programming of WWNN, established as the "Winner's News Network" in 1987, moved from the 980 signal to 1470 AM; 980 became a primarily Haitian ethnic station as WHSR. Beasley Broadcast Group of Naples acquired Goldsmith's three broadcasting outlets in 2000 for $18 million.

WWNN retained the "WNN" name and branded as "Your Health and Wealth Network" until early 2019, when it changed its imaging to "WWNN, South Florida's Talk".

=== South Florida's MoneyTalk Network ===
Co-owned WSBR (740 AM) and WHSR concurrently ceased operations at midnight on December 1, 2019, in order to allow for the sale of the associated transmitter site for both stations to Parkland, Florida for $7,100,000. The city had announced plans in September 2019 to develop a 36-acre park on the land.

WWNN absorbed WSBR's imaging, becoming "South Florida's MoneyTalk Network", and much of its programming. It also began broadcasting over its two translators in Boca Raton (W280DU 103.9) and Lauderdale Lakes (W245BC 96.9).

=== Five owners in two years ===
On February 2, 2022, Beasley sold WWNN and its two translators to Marco Broadcasting. The sale was consummated on April 1, 2022, at a price of $1.25 million.

On May 25, 2022, Marco sold WWNN and its two translators to Vic Canales Media Group. On July 5, 2022, the station added oldies music as "Oldies 95.3/96.9", with music from The True Oldies Channel. The sale to Vic Canales Media Group was consummated on August 19, 2022, at a price of $1.45 million. Canales kept the translators, selling WWNN itself to Radio Activa Media Group in August 2023 for $450,000. Months later, it was sold to Shekinah Radio International LLC, affiliated with the Tabernacle of Glory Church, for $675,000.
