= WSBR =

Radio station in Boca Raton, Florida

- Boca Raton, Florida; United States
- Broadcast area: West Palm Beach area
- Frequency: 740 kHz

Programming
- Format: Defunct (was business talk)

Ownership
- Owner: Beasley Broadcast Group, Inc.; (Beasley Media Group Licenses, LLC)
- Sister stations: WWNN

History
- First air date: May 3, 1965; 61 years ago
- Last air date: December 1, 2019; 6 years ago
- Call sign meaning: "Wonderful Sound of Boca Raton"

Technical information
- Facility ID: 60634
- Class: B
- Power: 2,500 watts day 940 watts night
- Transmitter coordinates: 26°20′6.00″N 80°15′55.00″W
- Translator: See § Translators

WSBR (740 AM) was an American radio station licensed to Boca Raton, Florida, United States, broadcasting to the West Palm Beach/Boca Raton radio market. The station was last owned by Beasley Broadcast Group, Inc., doing business as Beasley Media Group, LLC. Its studios were in Boca Raton, and the transmitter was located in Parkland. Its license was cancelled on April 19, 2021, as the station had been silent for over one year.

== History ==
Fred S. Grunwald, operating as Boca Broadcasters, obtained the construction permit for a new daytime-only AM station in Boca Raton on July 5, 1962. Initially assigned the call letters WFSG (for his initials), they were changed to WSBR before going on air in May 1965. It was the first radio station licensed to Boca Raton. The station maintained a transmitter at the Everglades Game Farm and studios in downtown Boca Raton. Grunwald was a surgeon who lived in Washington, D.C., but his interest in electronics led him to start a station. Grunwald sold the station in 1967 to Burbach Radio (named for its principals Robert Burstein and John Laubach), which owned two stations in Pennsylvania. In 1978, the station was approved to begin broadcasting at night.

From its inception in 1965, WSBR served as primarily a middle-of-the-road station, but in the late 1970s, it shifted to a big band and standards format. The station was sold in 1982 to Sam Cook Digges, under the name Goldcoast Communications. Cook Digges, a retired CBS Radio president, immediately exchanged the station's ABC Radio affiliation for one with CBS and finally began nighttime broadcasts. One other addition also had to do with its ownership: Cook Digges was on the board of directors of the New England Patriots, and team owner Billy Sullivan—who had a home in Atlantis—was a part-owner of Goldcoast, so WSBR began broadcasting Patriots games.

1985 and 1986 saw a series of ownership changes for WSBR. Cook Digges sold his shares to Edmund Byrne, which resulted in a new Boca Raton Broadcasting Corporation becoming the licensee. However, Malcolm Kahn and George Delson, who chose to trade as Beach Boca Broadcasting, bought the station within a year. Under Kahn's management, WSBR added more talk programming.

=== South Florida's MoneyTalk Radio ===
In 1988, SMH Broadcasting acquired WSBR. Howard Goldsmith, the head of SMH, inherited a station that was losing money and immediately changed the station to business talk as "MoneyTalk Radio" in April 1989. The new WSBR carried brokered time programs made available initially to stock brokers, commodities brokers, bond brokers, investment brokers and mortgage brokers. Non-business talk programs still remained from the Kahn era: Palm Beach resident Herbert Swope and newspaper columnist Greg Allen had daily programs, with the rest of the broadcast day devoted to a combination of "per inquiry" informercials and programming via satellite from the Business Radio Network.

On December 31, 2014, WHFS (1010 AM) in Tampa Bay began to simulcast WSBR.

=== Closure ===
WSBR and WHSR, the co-owned brokered ethnic station that also used the Nob Hill Road transmitter site, ceased operations at midnight on December 1, 2019; Beasley had sold the associated land to the city of Parkland, Florida in early September 2019 for $7,100,000, with plans by the city to develop a park. The remaining Beasley station based in Boca Raton, WWNN, absorbed WSBR's imaging and much of its programming; it also began broadcasting over its two translators in Boca Raton and Lauderdale Lakes.

== Translators ==
On June 2, 2015, WSBR began simulcasting on translator W245BC (96.9 FM), which is licensed to Lauderdale Lakes. This translator adds coverage in east-central and northwestern Broward County. Both translators began broadcasting WWNN at the closure of WSBR.

Broadcast translators for WWNN (formerly WSBR)
Call sign	Frequency	City of license	FID	ERP (W)	HAAT	Class	FCC info
W245BC	96.9 FM	Lauderdale Lakes, Florida	138625	250	118 m (387 ft)	D	LMS
W280DU	103.9 FM	Boca Raton, Florida	142696	250	150 m (492 ft)	D	LMS
