= WHOT (AM) =

Radio station in Palm River-Clair Mel, Florida, United States

- Palm River-Clair Mel, Florida; United States
- Broadcast area: Tampa Bay
- Frequency: 1590 kHz
- Branding: Radio Nouvelle Lumiere

Programming
- Language: Haitian Creole
- Format: Talk

Ownership
- Owner: Gulf Coast Broadcasting; (Tampa Radio, Inc.)

History
- First air date: December 4, 1957; 68 years ago
- Former call signs: WILZ (1957–1976); WRXB (1976–2019); WTPA (2019–2021)

Technical information
- Licensing authority: FCC
- Facility ID: 57478
- Class: B
- Power: 9,800 watts day; 160 watts night
- Transmitter coordinates: 27°56′53.1″N 82°23′46.3″W
- Translator: 96.1 W241DH (Bradenton) (Note: This translator is currently rebroadcasting WCIE (FM) under special temporary authority until it can move to Tampa.)

Links
- Public license information: Public file; LMS
- Website: tampa.sakpase.fm

WHOT (1590 kHz) is a commercial AM radio station that broadcasts a Haitian Creole-language talk and music radio format. Licensed to Palm River-Clair Mel, Florida, it serves the Tampa Bay area as Radio Nouvelle Lumiere. The station is owned by Gulf Coast Broadcasting with the license held by Tampa Radio, Inc. The studios and offices are in St. Petersburg.

By day, WHOT is powered at 9,800 watts. At night, to protect other stations on 1590 AM, it reduces power to 160 watts. The transmitter is on East Washington Street in Tampa, near McKay Bay. An FM translator, 96.1 W241DH, will simulcast WHOT when it is moved from Bradenton, Florida, into the Tampa radio market.

== History ==
Originally owned by Holiday Isles Broadcasting Company, the station signed on the air as WILZ on February 4, 1957. It was originally licensed to St. Pete Beach, with its studios at 7500 Boca Ciega Drive. Its initial format was adult standards and big band music, featuring "all time favorites from 1925 to the present". One of its disc jockeys in the early 1960s was Elmo Tanner, the former singer and whistler with the Ted Weems Orchestra.

In 1969, Millbeck Broadcasting bought the station, maintaining the adult standards format and adding New York Mets baseball. The station subsequently changed its format to Top 40 as Z16 and, in 1973, changed to an oldies format as Solid Gold 16. In 1975, WILZ was bought by Gene Danzey, a former general manager for WTMP in Tampa, who retooled the station as WRXB, the region's first black-owned station.

Danzey sold the station in 1996 to Rolyn Communications, Inc. A transfer was requested to Metropolitan Radio Group in 1996, but that transfer was not completed until 1999. In 2000, Gary Acker (owner of Metropolitan Radio Group) died, and control of the station passed to his estate, which was overseen by Mark Acker. In 2007, the station was sold to Walter Kotaba's Polnet Communications.

Past announcers at WRXB included Jim Murray, Rob Simone and Sister Dianne Hughes. WRXB also featured state legislator Wengay Newton with a weekly community program, along with Pastor Brian Anderson's The Voice of the Village and Undignified Praise and Worship, produced by Richard Guess. Other announcers included Ivan Summers and Tony King hosting TK's Midday Cafe.

On August 20, 2009, WRXB had its first major format change in more than 30 years when it switched to 24-hour urban gospel programming. Gene Danzey died of respiratory failure on May 29, 2012.

The station went off the air on November 14, 2017.

Effective September 26, 2019, Polnet Communications sold WRXB and translator W241DH to Sam Rogatinsky's Gulf Coast Broadcasting for $165,000. The station's call sign was simultaneously changed to WTPA. At that time, the newly renamed station began broadcasting Haitian Creole programming as Radio Nouvelle Lumiere, modeled after Rogatinsky's WPBR in West Palm Beach.

Effective August 7, 2020, the station moved its community of license from St. Pete Beach to Palm River-Clair Mel. On November 1, 2021, the WTPA call sign was moved to the former WHSR in Pompano Beach, which Rogatinsky acquired in 2021. AM 1590's new call sign became WHOT.
