= WPBR =

Haitian French talk radio station in Lantana–West Palm Beach, Florida

- Lantana, Florida; United States
- Broadcast area: West Palm Beach, Florida
- Frequency: 1340 kHz
- Branding: Radio Nouvelle Lumiere

Programming
- Format: Haitian Creole talk and contemporary hits

Ownership
- Owner: Palm Beach Radio Group LLC

History
- First air date: 1942
- Former call signs: WWPG (1941–1957); WQXT (1957–1972)
- Call sign meaning: "Wonderful Palm Beach Radio"

Technical information
- Licensing authority: FCC
- Facility ID: 50333
- Class: C
- Power: 810 watts unlimited
- Transmitter coordinates: 26°37′13.2″N 80°4′50.1″W
- Translators: 95.1 W236CV (Lantana); 96.1 W241AX (Boca Raton)
- Repeaters: 1520 WNDO (Orlando); 1590 WHOT (Tampa)

Links
- Public license information: Public file; LMS
- Website: sakpase.fm

WPBR (1340 kHz) is a commercial AM radio station licensed to Lantana, Florida and serving the West Palm Beach area. The station airs a Haitian Creole talk and contemporary hits radio format. It is owned by Palm Beach Radio Group LLC.

In addition to its broadcasts on 1340 kHz, WPBR is also heard on two FM translators: W236CV 95.1 MHz, Lantana and W241AX 96.1 MHz, Boca Raton.

== History ==
The 1340 frequency was first licensed on January 7, 1942, as WWPG ("World's Winter Playground"). In 1957, it changed to WQXT. WQXT had a middle of the road format of popular music, with news and programs from the ABC Radio Network. In the 1970s, it aired an adult contemporary format under program director Don Kelley.

In 1972, Everett and Valerie Aspinwall bought the radio station from Knight Quality Stations and changed the call letters to WPBR ("Wonderful Palm Beach Radio"). It returned to a middle of the road music format, with the Aspinwalls doing a New York-style midday talk show called "Palm Beach AM". Initially, Joe Vogel was afternoon drive disc jockey, with Frank Chester nights and Gene Tognacci on weekends.

As an affiliate of the NBC Radio Network, WPBR ran NBC Monitor on the weekends and a locally produced classical music show.
