= A Time of Changes (album) =

Studio album by Blitzkrieg
- Released: April 1985
- Recorded: Impulse Studios, Newcastle upon Tyne, England
- Genre: Heavy metal
- Length: 38:46
- Label: Neat
- Producer: Martin Smith, Brian Ross

Blitzkrieg chronology
A Time of Changes (1985)	Ten Years of Blitzkrieg EP (1991)

Professional ratings
Review scores
Source	Rating
AllMusic	3/5 stars
Collector's Guide to Heavy Metal	6/10
Rock Hard	8.0/10

A Time of Changes is the debut studio album by the British heavy metal band Blitzkrieg, released in April 1985.

== History ==
This album came out when Brian Ross decided to reform Blitzkrieg and record the album they wanted to record before their split-up in 1981. After the original split of Blitzkrieg, Ross sang with Avenger, Satan and Lonewolf. "Pull the Trigger" is in fact a Satan song that wasn't featured on their first album Court in the Act. Ross recorded it with Satan, and it appeared on an earlier demo, Into the Fire. Satan guitarist Russ Tippins makes a guest appearance on the song. "Take a Look Around" was recorded during these sessions and intended to be used on a single, but that never materialized. It is added as track six (4:14) on the A Time of Changes – Phase 1 compilation. The crowd noise on "Hell to Pay" was lifted from a Queen concert as a joke on the rumors that the Blitzed Alive tape was a fake live show. At the time of its release most people believed "Hell to Pay" was actually recorded live.

The original 1985 album was never released outside of the UK on vinyl, though it was released in Japan on CD in 1990 by Neat Records/Teichiku Records Japan (TECP-25355) under the title A Time of Changes + More with two bonus tracks and subsequently by Castle in 1992 under the original title. The two extra tracks are from the original first 1981 release of the single "Buried Alive", which features "Blitzkrieg" on the "B-side". This version of "Blitzkrieg" differs from the release on the 1985 album and is most notable as the version which Metallica used to play in their early years and based their 1984 cover version on.

== Track listing ==
All tracks are written by Brian Ross and Jim Sirotto, unless otherwise stated

Side one
No.	Title	Writer(s)	Length
1.	"Ragnarok" (Instrumental)	Ross, Sirotto, Ian Boddy	1:45
2.	"Inferno"	Ross, Sirotto, Ian Jones	4:30
3.	"Blitzkrieg"	Ross, Sirotto, Jones	3:21
4.	"Pull the Trigger"	Russ Tippins	5:25
5.	"Armageddon"		6:16

Side two
No.	Title	Length
6.	"Hell to Pay"	4:44
7.	"Vikings"	4:03
8.	"A Time of Changes"	6:24
9.	"Saviour"	3:38

Japanese CD edition bonus tracks
No.	Title	Length
10.	"Buried Alive" (1981 version)	3:31
11.	"Blitzkrieg" (1981 version)	3:49

== Personnel ==
Blitzkrieg

- Brian Ross – vocals, producer, keyboards on tracks 7 and 8
- Mick Procter – lead guitar
- Jim Sirotto – rhythm guitar
- Mick Moore – bass guitar
- Sean Taylor – drums

Additional musicians

- Ian Boddy – keyboards on track 1
- Russ Tippins – guitar on track 4

Production

- Martin Smith – producer, engineer
