= Ivor, Virginia =

- Town
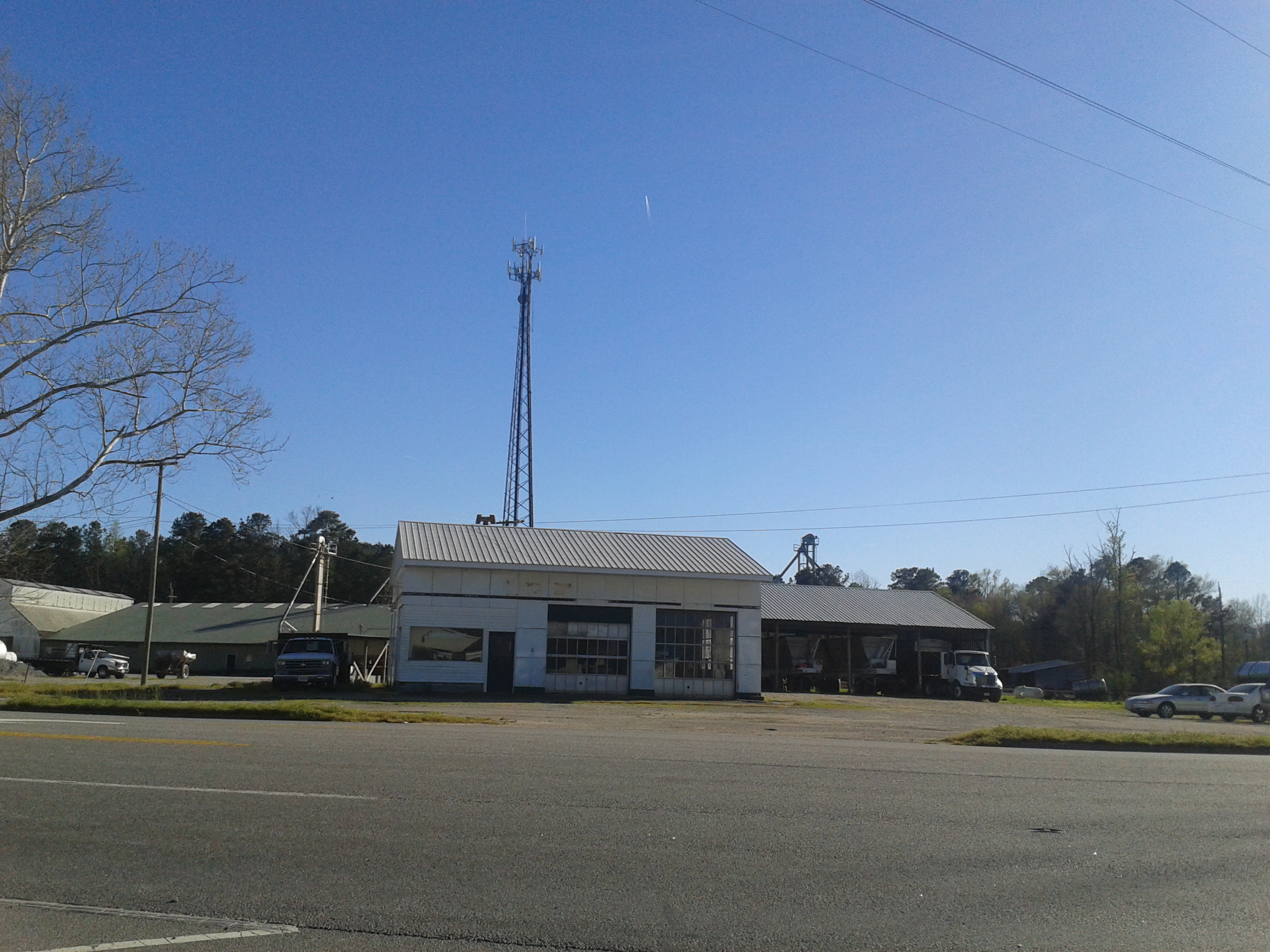
- Buildings along General Mahone Blvd. in Ivor

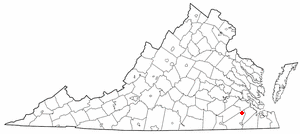
- Location of Ivor, Virginia
- Coordinates: 36°54′24″N 76°53′52″W
- Country: United States
- State: Virginia
- County: Southampton

Area
  - Total: 1.09 sq mi (2.83 km^{2})
  - Land: 1.09 sq mi (2.82 km^{2})
  - Water: 0 sq mi (0.00 km^{2})
- Elevation: 89 ft (27 m)

Population (2020)
  - Total: 312
  - Estimate (2019): 316
  - Density: 290.0/sq mi (111.97/km^{2})
- Time zone: UTC−5 (Eastern (EST))
  - Summer (DST): UTC−4 (EDT)
- ZIP code: 23866
- Area codes: 757, 948
- FIPS code: 51-40232
- GNIS feature ID: 1495747
- Website: http://www.townofivor.com/home.html

Ivor is an incorporated town in Southampton County, Virginia, United States. It is twenty-three miles northwest of Suffolk. As of the 2020 census, Ivor had a population of 312.

== Geography ==
According to the United States Census Bureau, the town has a total area of 1.1 square miles (2.8 km^{2}), all land.

== Demographics ==
Historical population
Census	Pop.	Note	%±
1910	297		—
1920	443		49.2%
1930	309		−30.2%
1940	339		9.7%
1950	377		11.2%
1960	398		5.6%
1970	444		11.6%
1980	403		−9.2%
1990	324		−19.6%
2000	320		−1.2%
2010	339		5.9%
2020	312		−8.0%
U.S. Decennial Census

At the 2000 census, there were 320 people, 135 households and 100 families living in the town. The population density was 293.6 per square mile (113.4/km^{2}). There were 152 housing units at an average density of 139.5 per square mile (53.8/km^{2}). The racial makeup of the town was 76.25% White, 19.69% African American, 1.25% Native American, and 2.81% from two or more races.

There were 135 households, of which 25.9% had children under the age of 18 living with them, 62.2% were married couples living together, 10.4% had a female householder with no husband present, and 25.9% were non-families. 24.4% of all households were made up of individuals, and 17.0% had someone living alone who was 65 years of age or older. The average household size was 2.37 and the average family size was 2.78.

20.0% of the population were under the age of 18, 6.6% from 18 to 24, 24.4% from 25 to 44, 27.5% from 45 to 64, and 21.6% who were 65 years of age or older. The median age was 44 years. For every 100 females, there were 91.6 males. For every 100 females age 18 and over, there were 84.2 males.

The median household income was $34,583 and the median family income was $44,688. Males had a median income of $40,938 and females $18,750. The per capita income was $18,033. About 4.4% of families and 5.1% of the population were below the poverty line, including 5.7% of those under age 18 and 9.8% of those age 65 or over.

== Notable people ==
- Antonio Banks, American football player.
- Thomas Downing, American abstract painter, was raised in Ivor.
- Sadie O. Horton, notable American female Merchant Marine.
