= Sadie O. Horton =

Woman mariner during World War II

Sadie Owney Horton
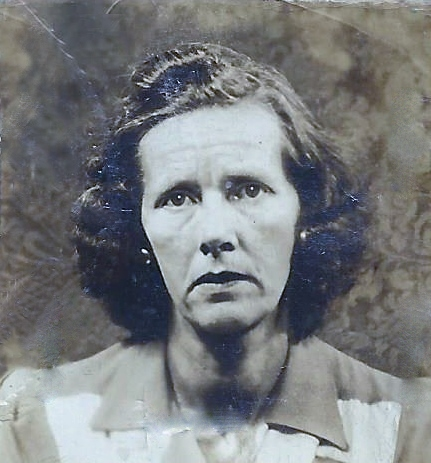
- Coast Guard identification photo, c. 1942
- Born: October 25, 1899; Ivor, Virginia, United States
- Died: December 8, 1997 (aged 98); Elizabeth City, North Carolina, United States
- Known for: First recorded female Merchant Marine veteran of World War II
- Spouse: William L. Horton Sr.

Sadie Carrie Owney Horton (October 25, 1899 – December 8, 1997) was an American female mariner who worked aboard an East Coast U.S. Merchant Marine barge. In February 2017, Horton posthumously received official U.S. military veteran's status for her wartime service, becoming the first recorded female Merchant Marine veteran of World War II.

== Biography ==
Sadie Carrie Owney was born in 1899 in Ivor, Virginia, the daughter of Arthur Oswald Oney Sr. and Mary Lou Johnson. Her family moved to North Carolina around 1909. In 1920, Horton married William Lee Horton Sr.

During World War II, Horton worked as a riveter at the Consolidated Defense Plant in Elizabeth City. After her son William Jr. was killed in action when the Tug Menominee was sunk by a German U-boat in 1942, Horton and her family relocated to serve aboard an East Coast U.S. Merchant Marine barge near Williamston, with her husband serving as captain.

Horton applied for seaman papers in 1942, but was denied papers by the United States Maritime Commission office as they were not accepting women in the Merchant Marines at that time. She was, however, issued a formal U.S. Coast Guard identification to use for work.

Horton served for a total of 36 months, making 90 round trips from Hampton Roads, Virginia to as north as Nova Scotia. She filled various roles, including as the ship's cook, running the boiler, and working in the ship's wheelhouse. She actively served until December 31, 1946.

Horton died in 1997, aged 98.

== Legacy ==
In February 2017, Horton posthumously received a DD 214 honorable discharge from the U.S. military which granted her veteran's status for her wartime service, becoming the first recorded female Merchant Marine veteran of World War II.
