= Blitzkrieg (metal band) =

English heavy metal band

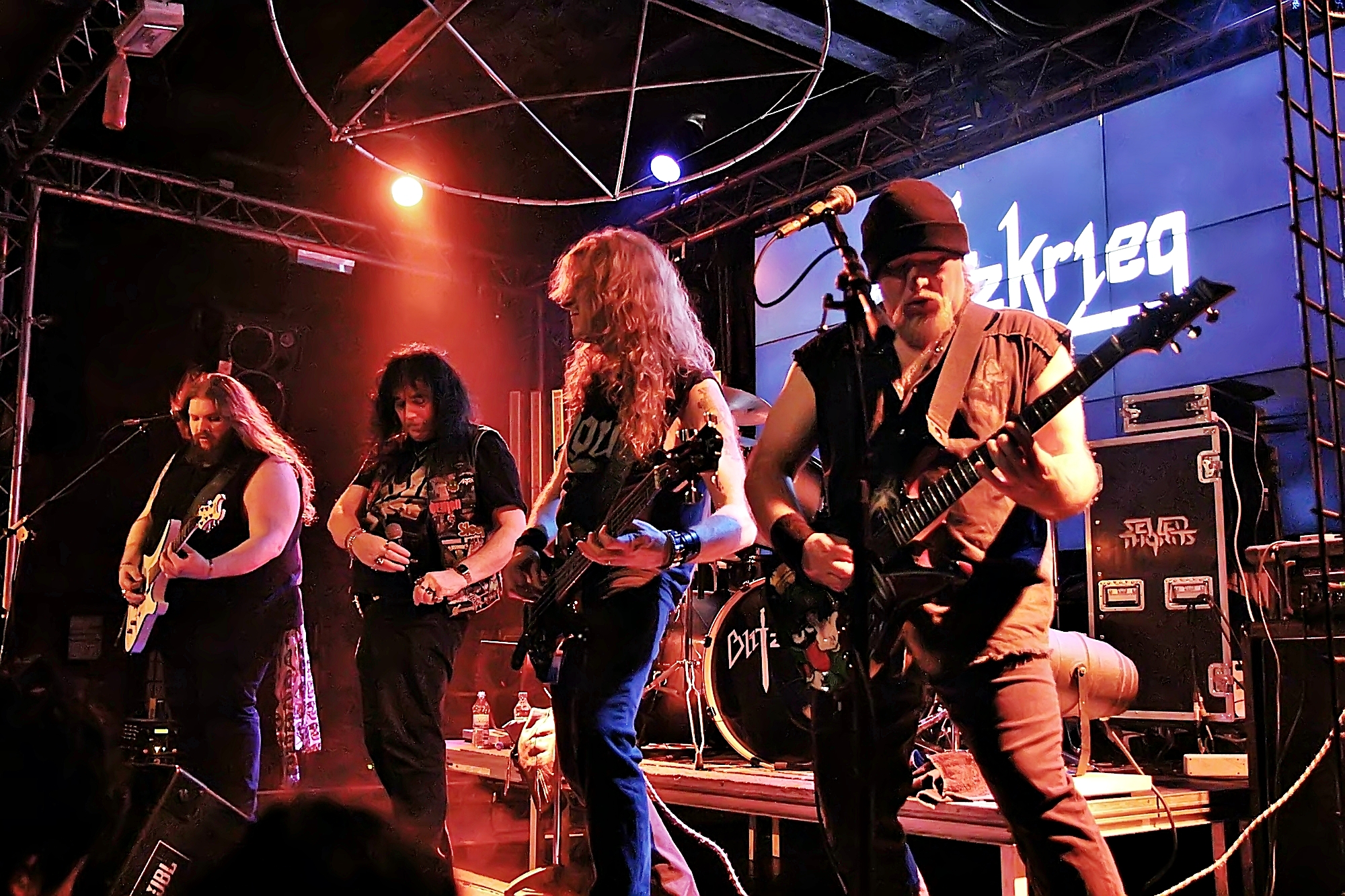
- Blitzkrieg in 2018

Background information
- Origin: Leicester, England
- Genre: Heavy metal
- Years active: 1980–1981, 1984–1991, 1992–1994, 1996–1999, 2001–present
- Labels: Neat (1980–1985, 1995–1998); Roadrunner (1991); Edgy (2002); Metal Nation (2004-2017); Mighty Music (2017–present)
- Members: Brian Ross; Nick Jennison; Alan Ross; Ben Adcock; Matt Graham

Blitzkrieg are an English heavy metal band formed in Leicester in 1980. The current line-up consists of Brian Ross (vocals), Alan Ross (guitar), Ben Adcock (bass), Matt Graham (drums), and Nick Jennison (guitar). Ross is the only remaining member from the band's founding, and the band are now based in Newcastle.

== History ==
In 1980, Brian Ross joined Leicester band Split Image (comprising guitarists Jim Sirotto and Ian Jones, bassist Steve English, and drummer Steve Abbey), and after a change of name to Blitzkrieg, their demo led to a record deal in October 1980 with Neat Records, a label that was signing many of the bands involved with the new wave of British heavy metal movement. After a single released in 1981, Jones and English were replaced by John Antcliffe and Mick Moore. In the early stages of Blitzkrieg's career they regularly produced gigs in England, but then later split in 1981 before the band's debut album was completed. Brian Ross most notably went on to join Satan, another metal band, along with stints in Avenger, Lone Wolf and Unter den Linden.

In 1984, Ross reformed the band, with Sirotto, and Moore, the line-up bolstered by guitarist Mick Proctor (of Tygers of Pan Tang) and drummer Sean Taylor (Satan/Blind Fury, ex-Raven) to record the Blitzkrieg album that was originally planned to be released in 1981, A Time of Changes. It was released in 1985.

"Blitzkrieg", the B-side of the band's debut single, was covered by Metallica for the B-side of the 1984 single "Creeping Death". Metallica were fans of Blitzkrieg and before they were signed had sent Ross a demo to try to get signed to Neat Records, for whom Ross was then doing A&R work.

In 1991, Roadracer Records released the 10 Years of Blitzkrieg, and the band recorded new material which was combined with older tracks on the Unholy Trinity album, the release of which was delayed until 1995 due to contractual issues. The band continued with Ross, who was the only constant member, releasing the albums Ten (1997), The Mists of Avalon (1998), Absolute Power (2002), Absolutely Live (2004), Sins and Greed (2005), and Theatre of the Damned (2007).

After a six-year gap, the band returned in 2013 with the album Back from Hell. A re-recorded and expanded version of A Time of Changes was released in 2015 to celebrate 30 years since the original release. The band's next album, Judge Not!, was released in 2018, with an EP, Loud and Proud, following in 2019.

In 2022, Blitzkrieg released a new single, "I Am His Voice", along with a live version of "Pull the Trigger". This was followed in 2024 by an eponymous album.

== Band members ==
Current members

- Brian Ross — lead vocals, keyboards (1980–1981, 1984–1991, 1992–1994, 1996–1999, 2001–present)
- Alan Ross — guitar, backing vocals (2012–present)
- Matt Graham — drums (2015–present)
- Ben Adcock — bass (2025–present)
- Nick Jennison — guitar, backing vocals (2020–present)

Former members

- Jim Sirotto — lead guitar (1980–1981, 1984–1985; died 2025)
- Steve Abbey — drums (1980–1981)
- Ian Jones — rhythm guitar (1980–1981; died 2009)
- Steve English — bass (1980–1981)
- Mick Moore — bass (1981, 1984–1985; died 2024)
- John Antcliffe — rhythm guitar (1981)
- Mick Procter — guitar (1984–1985)
- Sean Taylor — drums (1984–1985, 1992–1994)
- Chris Green — guitar (1985)
- Gav Taylor — drums (1985)
- John "J. D." Binnie — guitar (1986–1987)
- Chris Beard — guitar (1986–1987)
- Darren Parnaby — bass (1986–1987)
- Sean Wilkinson — drums (1986–1987)
- Glenn S. Howes — guitar, backing vocals (1988–1991, 1997–1999)
- Steve Robertson — guitar (1988–1989)
- Robbie Robertson — bass (1988–1989)
- Kyle Gibson — drums (1988–1989)
- Tony J. Liddle — guitar, backing vocals (1989–1991, 1992–1994, 1996–1997, 2001–2002; died 2025)
- Gary Young — drums (1989–1991)
- Glenn Carey — bass (1989–1991)
- Dave Anderson — bass (1992–1994)
- Phil Miller — guitar (1996–1997)
- Steve Ireland — bass (1996–1997)
- Paul White — drums (1996)
- Neil Nattrass — drums (1996–1997)
- Martin Richardson — guitar (1997–1998), bass (1998)
- Mark Hancock — drums (1997–1998), bass (1998)
- Gav Gray — drums (1997–1998, 1998–1999)
- Paul Nesbitt — guitar (1998–1999, 2001–2006)
- Mark Wyndebank — drums (1998–1999)
- Phil Brewis — drums (2001–2012)
- Andy Galloway — bass (2001–2004)
- Ken Johnson — guitar, keyboards, backing vocals (2002–2019)
- Paul Brewis — bass (2004–2012)
- Guy Laverick — guitar (2006–2012)
- Bill Baxter — bass, backing vocals (2012–2017)
- Mick Kerrigan — drums (2012–2015)
- Huw Holding — bass (2017–2019)
- Liam Ferguson — bass (2019-2025)

== Discography ==
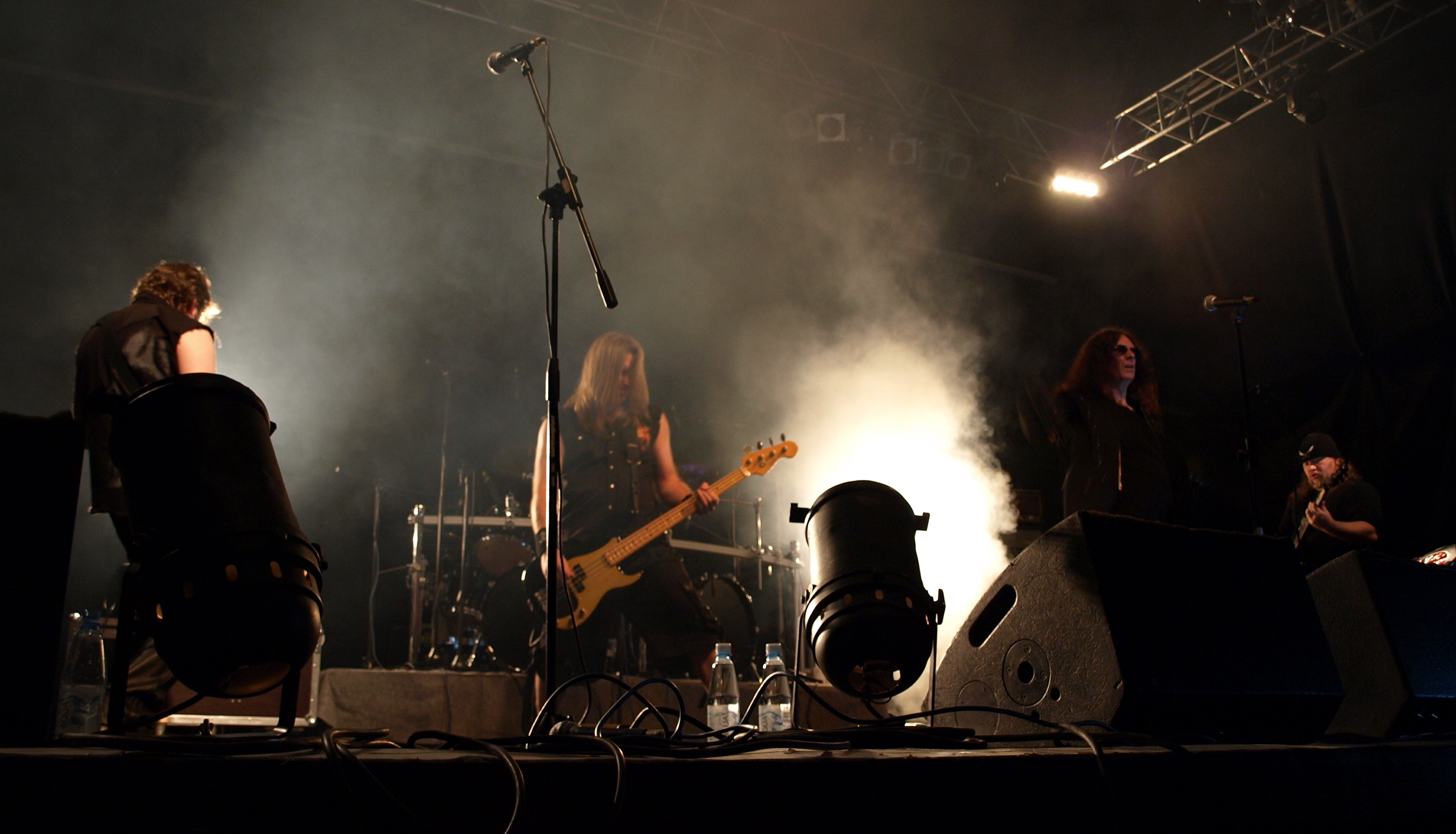
Blitzkrieg performing in 2008

Studio albums

- A Time of Changes (1985)
- Unholy Trinity (1995)
- Ten (1997)
- The Mists of Avalon (1998)
- Absolute Power (2002)
- Sins and Greed (2005)
- Theatre of the Damned (2007)
- Back from Hell (2013)
- A Time of Changes (30th Anniversary Edition) (2015)
- Judge Not! (2018)
- Blitzkrieg (2024)

Live albums

- Absolutely Live (2004)

Compilations

- A Time of Changes, Phase 1 (2003)
- The Boys from Brazil Street: 1981 Revisited (The Archives, Vol. One) (2014)
- The Boys from Brazil Street: The Farm Tapes (The Archives, Vol. Two) (2015)
- Inferno: The Complete Recordings Vol. I (1980-1998) (2022)

Extended plays

- 10 Years of Blitzkrieg (1991)
- Loud and Proud (2019)

Non-album singles

- "Buried Alive/Blitzkrieg" (1981)

Demos

- Blitzkrieg I (1981)
- Blitzed Alive (1981)

== See also ==
- List of new wave of British heavy metal bands
