= WTPA (AM) =

Radio station in Pompano Beach, Florida

- Pompano Beach, Florida; United States
- Broadcast area: South Florida
- Frequency: 980 kHz

Programming
- Language: Haitian Creole
- Format: Silent

Ownership
- Owner: Sam Rogatinsky; (HMDF, LLC)

History
- First air date: May 1, 1959 (as WLOD)
- Former call signs: WLOD (1958–1978); WPIP (1978–1982); WBSS (1982–1986); WWHR (1986–1987); WWNN (1987–1997); WHSR (1997–2021)
- Call sign meaning: Moved from 1590 AM in the Tampa area

Technical information
- Licensing authority: FCC
- Facility ID: 27420
- Class: B
- Power: 5,000 watts day; 2,500 watts night
- Transmitter coordinates: 26°20′06″N 80°15′55″W

Links
- Public license information: Public file; LMS

WTPA (980 AM) was a radio station that was broadcasting a Haitian Creole format. Licensed to Pompano Beach, Florida, United States, the station was owned by Sam Rogatinsky, through licensee HMDF, LLC. Its studios are in Boca Raton; the last transmitter site used was in Parkland.

== History ==
=== WLOD and WPIP ===
The Pompano Beach Broadcasting Corporation received a construction permit for a daytime-only radio station on 980 kHz in Pompano Beach on October 15, 1958. WLOD, standing for "Wonderful Land of Dreams", went on the air on May 1, 1959. The station went through several changes of ownership in its first few years. Before going on air, Wellington Shilling and Charles Johnson had sold their stakes to Arthur Harre and Leonard Versluis; within a year, the station had been acquired by the Franklin Broadcasting Company, which owned it until selling to Sunrise Broadcasting Company in 1965. The station sponsored a women's tennis tournament, which was dubbed the WLOD International.

After a series of attempts to improve WLOD's power and to broadcast at night, WLOD finally got both in 1978 with an improvement to 2,500 watts day and the addition of nighttime service with 500 watts. The station did not change its easy listening format, but it did use the move to relaunch as WPIP.

=== WBSS and WWHR ===
In 1981, WPIP's easy listening sound gave way to oldies, branded as "98 Gold, Blue Suede Radio". However, the choice of August 16 turned out to be a poor one to debut a new format: the station planned to be off the air, but instead it had to run hourly updates with Tropical Storm Dennis heading for the state. WPIP rebranded the next year as WBSS, for "boss", to complement the new format. A popular program in the WBSS era that also aired on other stations was the "Shoppers' Bazaar", hosted by Dick Vance, but the show was canceled in August 1983 after Vance, whose real name was Albin Richard Bloomburg, Jr., was investigated for misrepresentation in travel packages promoted on the program.

On December 5, 1986, WBSS changed its call letters to WWHR, coinciding with a new "urban gold" format. The move to a syndicated satellite format led to layoffs of most of 980 AM's air staff, with the station's operations director as the only local DJ in morning drive; the station also began broadcasting in AM stereo.

=== WWNN ===
In 1987, Sunrise sold WWHR to 777 Communications, Limited Partnership, for $1.4 million. The new ownership, headlined by West Palm Beach advertising agency owner Dudley Baker and with Joe Nuckols as general manager, changed the call letters to WWNN and relaunched the station on August 2 as the "Winner's News Network", featuring motivational programming. The WNN format, the first of its kind in the nation, included four- to five-minute segments of motivational tapes, obtained through an agreement with the Nightingale-Conant company and primarily focusing on sales and personal relationships, interspersed with news, weather and traffic reports and came with plans for national syndication. Because the station played ideas, not records, it played music between each motivational excerpt to help listeners digest each snippet.

At least one person found fault with WWNN's motivational programming, saying the station did not practice what it preached: a man charged in 1989 that the station refused to interview him for a position because he was blind, leading the Florida Federation for the Blind to protest outside a station self-help event.

In 1992, Howard Goldsmith's HMS Broadcasting, owner of Boca Raton's WSBR (740 AM), acquired WWNN and relocated its operations to Boca Raton. Goldsmith retained the motivational format in morning and afternoon drive, but much of WWNN's other programming became health talk. The WWNN call letters were moved in 1997 when Goldsmith acquired a much stronger, 50,000-watt signal at 1470 AM, the former WRBD.

=== WHSR ===
With WNN moved to 1470 kHz, 980 kHz entered into a new phase of its history and changed its call letters to WHSR, broadcasting programming in Haitian Creole. Most of WHSR's airtime was brokered to Lesly Jacques, a former Radio Métropole sports commentator who paid $600,000 a year in 1999 for 22 hours a day of airtime, operating as Radio Haiti Amérique Internationale and selling most of it to other programmers and using the rest for his own shows. He had started with a four-hour slot on the station after WWNN moved to 1470, and he had a devoted fan club and a retail store. Operations remained the same after Beasley Broadcast Group of Naples acquired Goldsmith's three broadcasting outlets in 2000 for $18 million.

Jacques's popularity came under some fire after Haiti's 2000 presidential election, as some in the community protested that Jacques did not give airtime to supporters of the country's new president, Jean-Bertrand Aristide. Edouard Laventure, an Aristide supporter who was fired by Jacques for alleged breaches of their agreements, claimed that Jacques had become too self-important. In 2002, Jacques was on air for 60 hours a week on WHSR. In addition to its music and talk programming for the Haitian community in South Florida, the station aired a variety of other brokered talk shows, including one hosted by a Jewish rabbi, Muslim programming, and Indian and Hindu programming.

=== Closure ===
In September 2019, the city of Parkland approved the acquisition of the Nob Hill Road transmitter site used by WHSR and WSBR from Beasley for $7.1 million; the city is to use the land, and an adjacent 12-acre parcel owned by the city, for a future park. As a result of the sale, both stations signed off at midnight on December 1, 2019. Haitian programming that had been on WHSR moved to another Haitian station in South Florida, WSRF (1580 AM). Indian programming that had been on WHSR moved to WHSR's sister station WWNN.

Effective February 3, 2021, Beasley sold WHSR and translator W280DU to Sam Rogatinsky's HMDF, LLC for $362,500. On November 1, 2021, Rogatinsky moved the WTPA call letters from 1590 AM near Tampa that November to allow that station to become WHOT.
