= Robert Barclay (statistician) =

Scottish statistician

Robert Steven Barclay FRSE (13 September 1901 – 20 March 1973) was a Scottish statistician, noted as a scholar of Orkney.

== Life ==
Barclay was born at Hurkisgarth, in Sandwick, on the Mainland of Orkney, to Margaret (née Manson) and Charles Noble Barclay. He was educated at Oxtro School, in Birsay, George Heriot's School, in Edinburgh, and the University of Edinburgh (BSc; PhD 1947).

Barclay served as an Ordinary Seaman in the Merchant Service from 1929 to 1933. During World War II he served as Lieutenant in the Royal Naval Reserve.

In 1949, he married Anne Moodie. In the same year, he was elected a Fellow of the Royal Society of Edinburgh. His proposers were William O. Kermack, Alexander Aitken, Frank Fraser Darling, James G. Kydd and J. B. de Winton Moloney. From 1949 to 1969 he was on the staff of Register House, Edinburgh.

Barclay died in Edinburgh on 20 March 1973.
