= Elmo Tanner =

American singer, whistler, bandleader and disc jockey (1904–1990)

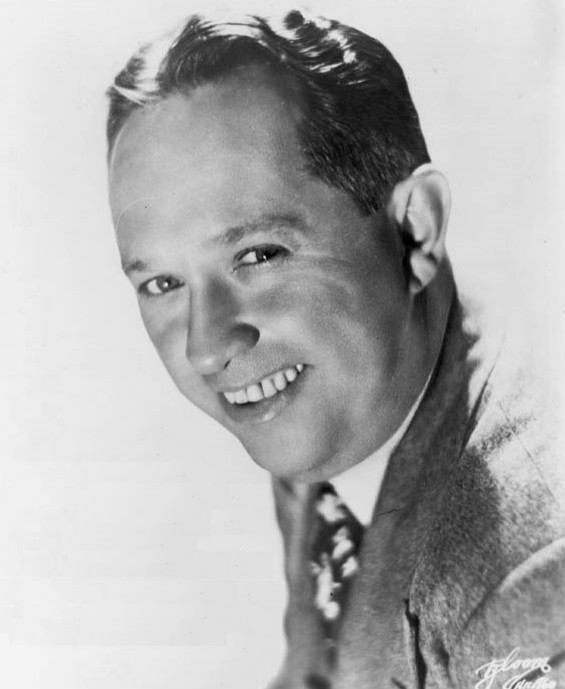
- Elmo Tanner circa 1940s–1950s

Background information
- Born: William Elmo Tanner; August 8, 1904; Nashville, Tennessee, US
- Died: December 20, 1990 (aged 86) St. Petersburg, Florida, US
- Genres: Big band, easy listening, traditional pop
- Occupations: Singer, Whistler, DJ
- Years active: Late 1920s – early 1960s

William Elmo Tanner, known as Elmo Tanner (August 8, 1904 – December 20, 1990) was an American whistler, singer, bandleader and disc jockey, best known for his whistling on the chart-topping song "Heartaches" with the Ted Weems Orchestra. Tanner and Weems recorded the song for two record companies within five years. Neither recording was successful originally. The song became a hit for both record companies after a Charlotte, North Carolina, disk jockey played it at random in 1947.

Tanner was originally hired by Weems as a vocalist; the bandleader discovered Tanner's whistling ability while the band was traveling to an engagement. Like Bing Crosby, he was able to whistle from his throat due to the muscles in his larynx. He subsequently became a featured performer as a whistler, earning the nicknames "Whistler’s Mother’s Boy", "The Whistling Troubador," and "the nation’s best-known whistler". He began appearing in films as part of the Ted Weems Orchestra in 1936; his first film role was in The Hatfields and McCoys, and he later appeared in the movie Swing, Sister, Swing (1938) and the musical film short, Swing Frolic (1942). Weems considered Tanner's whistling important enough to his orchestra that in 1939 he insured Tanner's throat for $10,000 ($231,459 in 2025). Besides musical whistling, he also imitated birds for Disney.

After a failed attempt at running a restaurant in his native Nashville in the early 1950s, he toured with the Elmo Tanner Quartet until 1958, when he found work as a disc jockey in Florida. After working as an auto dealer in the 1960s, in the early 1970s he resumed musical activity, singing with a St. Petersburg, Florida-based quartet.

== Early life ==
Tanner was born on August 8, 1904, in Nashville, Tennessee, the son of Felix Elmo Tanner and Willie Mae (née) Moore. He grew up in Detroit, and moved to Memphis with his family by 1926. As a young boy, Tanner studied the violin and was successful with it until eye trouble made it difficult for him to read notes. His musical training helped Tanner to develop the ability to scan music or lyrics quickly and then either sing or whistle what he had just read. On his walk home from work, Tanner passed a cemetery each night and started whistling as he passed by. Not everyone appreciated Tanner's whistling in the evening; he was once jailed in Albuquerque, New Mexico, for whistling after 10 pm. A graduate of the University of Tennessee, Tanner raced automobiles and worked as a mechanic in Memphis. While performing the duties of his employment he liked to whistle and sing. One day in 1927, he had a repair job for a customer who happened to work at WMC radio. After hearing Tanner singing while working on his car, the announcer suggested Tanner audition for the radio station. His consequent on-air appearance brought a call from Paramount Records, which had offices in Chicago.

== Career ==
By the late 1920s, Elmo Tanner had moved to the Chicago area and had established himself as a professional musician. Although Elmo Tanner never gained a large reputation as a singer, he was occasionally featured as such with Weems. It was as a vocalist that he made his initial recordings. He recorded a few dozen sides as a soloist for Paramount and Vocalion in 1927 through 1929. The Paramount discs appeared in the Race record series, and the Vocalion sides were likewise marketed to African Americans. (Note: A possible explanation for this may lie in a news story from 1935 written about Ted Weems and the members of his band. Tanner was described as "a dialect specialist. Brings down the house with his Negro imitations.") His versatility was noted by Vocalion, who utilized him to provide vocals for jazz outfits such as Jimmie Noone and for more sedate recordings with the Victor Young orchestra and with organist Eddie House. Not having signed an exclusive contract with any recording company, he was able to record for the prestigious Victor Talking Machine Company with Nathaniel Shilkret. In 1928, he formed a duet with Fred Rose as "The Tune Peddlers" and appeared on radio stations WLS, KYW, and WBBM.

While working at KYW with Rose, Tanner received an offer from Ted Weems. Weems offered a higher salary than Tanner was making at the radio station, but Tanner was hesitant because the job with Weems involved substantial travel. The KYW station manager offered to match the $50 per week salary Weems was proposing; a few days later, Weems made an even higher offer which was again matched by the station manager. This continued until Fred Rose came to work. When he arrived, Rose told the station manager that Weems was now offering Tanner $100 a week and he had accepted it.

=== Ted Weems Orchestra and "Heartaches" ===
Tanner joined the Ted Weems band as a singer in 1929 and became a prominent feature of the group. Tanner's whistling talent was unveiled by accident. In high spirits on their way to their next performance, the band members were singing, yelling and whistling on the bus. When Tanner joined in, Weems was impressed enough to add a whistling segment to one of the band's sets. Tanner whistled the Show Boat song, "Make Believe"; the audience asked for an encore. Tanner's whistling became so popular that Perry Como, another featured performer in the band, later recalled "The whistler was the whole band." On occasion, Tanner's lips would pucker up, interfering with his whistling. Although generally noted for his graciousness as a bandleader, Weems would have fun at Tanner's expense, running him through the most difficult songs in his repertoire when he noticed Tanner was struggling. Tanner became known as "Whistler's Mother's Boy", "The Whistling Troubador," and "the nation’s best-known whistler". Tanner was noted for the ease with which he hit high notes and performed trills. He had the ability to whistle while triple-tonguing, and like Bing Crosby, he was able to whistle from his throat due to the muscles in his larynx. His range was from low G to high B♭. Professional whistler Joel Brandon has named Tanner as a "top pick". Ted Weems considered Tanner's whistling so important to his band, he insured the musician's throat with Lloyd's of London for $10,000 in 1939. The policy provided payment for any medical expenses related to Tanner's possible inability to whistle and included payment to the holder if Tanner was unable to perform.

In an era when whistling was commonly featured on popular recordings, Tanner was often confused with Fred Lowery, who was blind and worked with Horace Heidt and his Musical Knights. People would come up to Tanner and ask if it was true that he was blind. "Only on Saturday night," he would reply. (Note: The two men shared a long friendship and a friendly rivalry.) When not singing or whistling, Elmo played guitar in the band. The primary purpose was evidently to show Tanner was "doing something" while keeping him in view, as it became a standard joke that the guitar he was playing had rubber bands in place of strings.

Tanner began appearing in films as part of the Ted Weems Orchestra in 1936; his first film role was in The Hatfields and McCoys, In 1938 he appeared in the movie Swing, Sister, Swing with the Weems outfit. Tanner also featured with Ted Weems and his Orchestra in a 1942 musical film short, Swing Frolic. During this time period Tanner appeared on the popular radio show Beat the Band with Weems; the program ran from January 28, 1940, until February 23, 1941.

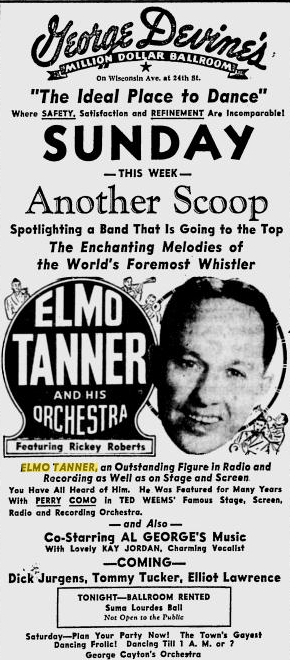
Ad for Tanner and his Orchestra in The Milwaukee Journal, 1947.

Tanner, Ted Weems, and the rest of his orchestra joined the Merchant Marine in 1942. At (and intermittently before) his discharge in 1944 he pursued a solo career. He headlined in various nightclubs and theaters such as Chicago's Oriental and Colosimo's and at the Orpheum in Los Angeles alongside the King Sisters and Maurice Rocco. Besides musical whistling, he also imitated birds for Disney. He continued to perform songs that were associated with Weems, such as "Nola". Tanner announced he would be fronting a twelve-piece band in September 1946; the band's theme was "Heartaches". He took over the Andy Anderson unit that was based in Atlanta and signed on with the William Morris Agency. His orchestra featured his whistling and vocals by Carol Bridges. However, this proved to be short-lived because of the surprise success of an old recording.

==== Delayed success of "Heartaches" ====
"Heartaches", composed by Al Hoffman and John Klenner in 1931, was recorded as an unusual half-rumba, half washboard rhythm. In 1933, RCA Victor had assigned the recording of the song to Ted Weems and his Orchestra, and wanted it recorded quickly. Weems and his band had time for only one rehearsal before recording the song. Initially, Weems did not like the song; he decided to omit the lyrics by way of having Tanner whistle instead. While running through the song at rehearsal, someone thought of trying it with a faster tempo than initially written. It was not a large seller, and the master was filed away. In 1938, Weems was now signed to Decca Records and was preparing to make another record. When someone had forgotten to assign a song for the "B" side of the record, Weems and Tanner made another recording of "Heartaches"; the Decca version was not any more successful than the Victor recording had been five years earlier.

In 1947, a young disc jockey in Charlotte, North Carolina, who worked the overnight shift had brought some older records to work with him. He chose one at random and put it on the turntable. Immediately after the record was broadcast, the radio station's telephones began ringing with people asking about the song and requesting to hear it again. By afternoon, the city's music stores were calling the radio station, asking where they could order copies of "Heartaches". Both RCA Victor and Decca reissued their respective recordings of "Heartaches" by Weems and Tanner for sale in the southern United States. As disc jockeys in other parts of the country began obtaining copies of the record and playing it, the demand for "Heartaches" went from coast to coast. This older recording went to the top of all the main charts in 1947, including sales, juke box play, and airplay.

Unusually, two separate recordings were given equal credit in the charts. Victor's version was recorded on August 4, 1933, and originally issued as Bluebird B5131. Decca's recording was made on August 23, 1938, and originally appeared with catalog number 2020B. The 1947 hit records were reissued as RCA Victor 20-2175 and Decca 25017, respectively. The two recordings sold a combined total of 8.5 million copies. Tanner said in a 1960 interview that neither he nor Ted Weems received any compensation for either of the "Heartaches" reissues as they both had let the contracts on the song expire while they were in the Merchant Marine. Tanner and Weems missed collecting an estimated $250,000 in royalties because of the expired contracts.

Because of the renewed success of "Heartaches", Tanner joined the re-formed Weems outfit in March 1947, and both were signed to Mercury Records. This later outfit often received poor reviews, with the exception of Elmo's "outstanding" whistling; it was Tanner's whistling that audiences most responded to. Tanner made one more recording of "Heartaches" in 1953 with Billy Vaughn for Dot Records.

=== Later life ===
Tanner left Weems in 1950; in 1953, he opened a restaurant in Nashville. This occupied him for a year and a half, but it proved to be a failure and Tanner suffered financially. He formed the Elmo Tanner Quartet and resumed touring for the next few years, until, tired of travel, he broke up his group in Seattle in 1958. He spent the next fourteen months in Birmingham as a disc jockey and leading a musical combo. He reunited briefly with Weems, then settled in the St. Petersburg, Florida, area in Treasure Island. Tanner's radio career began at WSGN in Birmingham with an overnight radio show called "Night Owl"; he was also on the air at WCOA (AM) in Pensacola, Florida. In 1959, Tanner began working as a disk jockey on radio station WILZ in St. Pete Beach, Florida, a position which lasted several years. During this time he continued to make recordings with orchestras such as David Carroll and Billy Vaughn to continued positive reviews. His association continued with Weems, making the occasional guest appearance with the band he was closely connected to. In the early 1960s, Tanner was also selling Datsuns at a local St. Petersburg auto dealership. In the early 1970s, Tanner resumed musical activity, singing with a St. Petersburg-based quartet.

== Personal life and death ==
In 1936, while Tanner was living in Chicago, he was divorced from his first wife, Verne. (Note: The former Mrs. Tanner was granted payments of $1,000 a week as part of the divorce settlement.) Tanner married Eleanor Jones of Birmingham on January 31, 1939, in Indianapolis. While playing an engagement with Weems, Tanner got his marriage license between the first and second acts on the bill, bought a wedding ring between the second and third acts and was married between the third and fourth acts. He met his second wife while working with the Weems band on Catalina Island. They had four children together: Elmo Jr., twins Margaret and Patricia, and John Emmet. By 1969 he was retired. Tanner underwent gall bladder surgery in 1985 and was able to recover at his home in St. Petersburg. He died on December 20, 1990, in St. Petersburg, Florida. Tanner is buried in Mount Olivet Cemetery, Nashville, Tennessee. He was posthumously inducted into the Whistlers' Hall of Fame in 1991, joining previous inductees Bing Crosby and Fred Lowery.
