= Satan (band) =

British heavy metal band

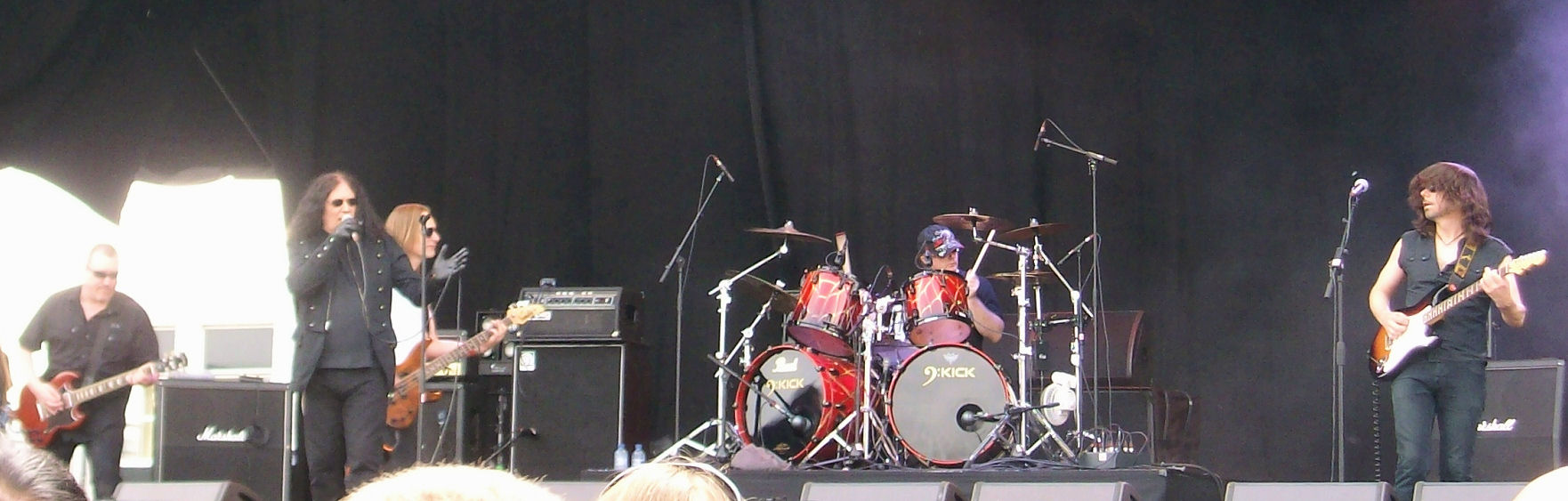
- Satan playing live in Belgium in 2013

Background information
- Also known as: Blind Fury; Pariah
- Origin: Newcastle upon Tyne, England
- Genre: Heavy metal
- Years active: 1979–1989; 1998–2004; 2011–present
- Labels: Guardian; Neat; Roadrunner; Steamhammer; Listenable; Metal Blade
- Members: Steve Ramsey; Russ Tippins; Graeme English; Sean Taylor; Brian Ross
- Past members: Andy Reed; Trevor Robinson; Ian McCormack; Ian Swift; Lou Taylor; Michael Jackson

Satan are an English heavy metal band originating from Newcastle upon Tyne in 1979, known as part of the new wave of British heavy metal movement. The band is considered influential for playing a form of proto-thrash/speed metal that was fairly advanced by the standards of the early 1980s.

== History ==
Satan originally formed in 1979 in England. The band's line-up has undergone a number of personnel changes and even name changes; for a time the band was called Blind Fury, putting out one album, 1985's Out of Reach, under that moniker before reverting to Satan. In 1988, the group changed its name to Pariah, releasing two albums under that name before folding in the early 1990s. In 1998, Pariah released another album. The band's shifting line-up has included members of many other heavy metal bands such as Blitzkrieg, Atomkraft, Avenger, Persian Risk, Raven, Cronos and Battleaxe. In 1990, Steve Ramsey (guitar) and Graeme English (bass) together with singer Martin Walkyier of UK thrash metal band Sabbat founded folk metal band Skyclad.

Satan performed a one-off gig at Germany's Wacken Open Air in 2004 and finally reunited in 2011. Since their reunion, the band has performed at several European festivals and released a new album, Life Sentence, in April 2013 via Listenable Records. In 2014 the band increased their global reach by touring in North and South America.

On 2 October 2015, the band released their fourth studio album, Atom by Atom, while two days earlier the entire album was made available for streaming via Invisible Oranges.

In 2018, the band signed a new multi-album recording contract with Metal Blade Records. Their fifth studio album and first under Metal Blade Records, Cruel Magic was released on 7 September 2018. The first single from Cruel Magic, "The Doomsday Clock", was released on 6 July. Satan released their next studio album, Earth Infernal, on 1 April 2022.

In 2025, the band participated in the Hell's Heroes music festival held at the White Oak Music Hall in Houston.

== Musical style ==
Metal Injection called Satan "one of the fastest and most thrash-y NWOBHM bands." The band's 1983 debut album Court in the Act has been characterized by "intricate guitar leads, caffeinated drums, and singing so seductive it could charm a black cat." The album's sound is also characterized by its sense of melody, and has drawn comparisons to the speed metal of the Bay area, "before that scene was even remotely famous." Metal Injection described the band's sound as "Satan’s brew." According to Eduardo Rivadavia of AllMusic: "1983's Court in the Act bordered on the yet undefined style of thrash metal, thanks to the frenetic speeds achieved in cuts like 'Trial By Fire' and the amazing 'Break Free.' But the album also boasted more accessible and melodic mid-paced metal fare, putting great effort into the memorable melodies and choruses heard on 'Broken Treaties,' 'Hunt You Down,' and early-day favorite 'Blades of Steel.'"

== Members ==
Current

- Steve Ramsey – guitars, backing vocals (1979–present)
- Russ Tippins – guitars, backing vocals (1979–present)
- Graeme English – bass (1980–present)
- Sean Taylor – drums (1983–present)
- Brian Ross – lead vocals (1983, 2011–present)

Former

- Andy Reed – drums (1979–1981)
- Trevor Robinson – lead vocals (1979–1982)
- Ian McCormack – drums (1981–1983)
- Ian Swift – lead vocals (1982–1983)
- Lou Taylor – lead vocals (1984–1985)
- Michael Jackson – lead vocals (1985–1988)

Timeline

== Discography ==
=== Studio albums ===
As Satan

- Court in the Act (1983)
- Suspended Sentence (1987)
- Life Sentence (2013)
- Atom by Atom (2015)
- Cruel Magic (2018)
- Earth Infernal (2022)
- Songs in Crimson (2024)

As Pariah

- The Kindred (1988)
- Blaze of Obscurity (1989)
- Unity (1998)

As Blind Fury

- Out of Reach (1985)

=== Singles and EPs ===
- Kiss of Death (1982)
- Into the Future (1986)
- The Doomsday Clock (2018)
- Twelve Infernal Lords (2020)

=== Demos ===
- The First Demo (1981)
- Into the Fire (1982)
- Dirt Demo '86 (1986)

=== Compilations and live albums ===
- Blitzkrieg in Holland (2000)
- Live in the Act (2004)
- Into the Fire / Kiss of Death (2011)
- The Early Demos (2011)
- Trail of Fire-Live in North America (2014)
- Early Rituals (2020)

== See also ==
- List of new wave of British heavy metal bands
