= Brian Ross (singer) =

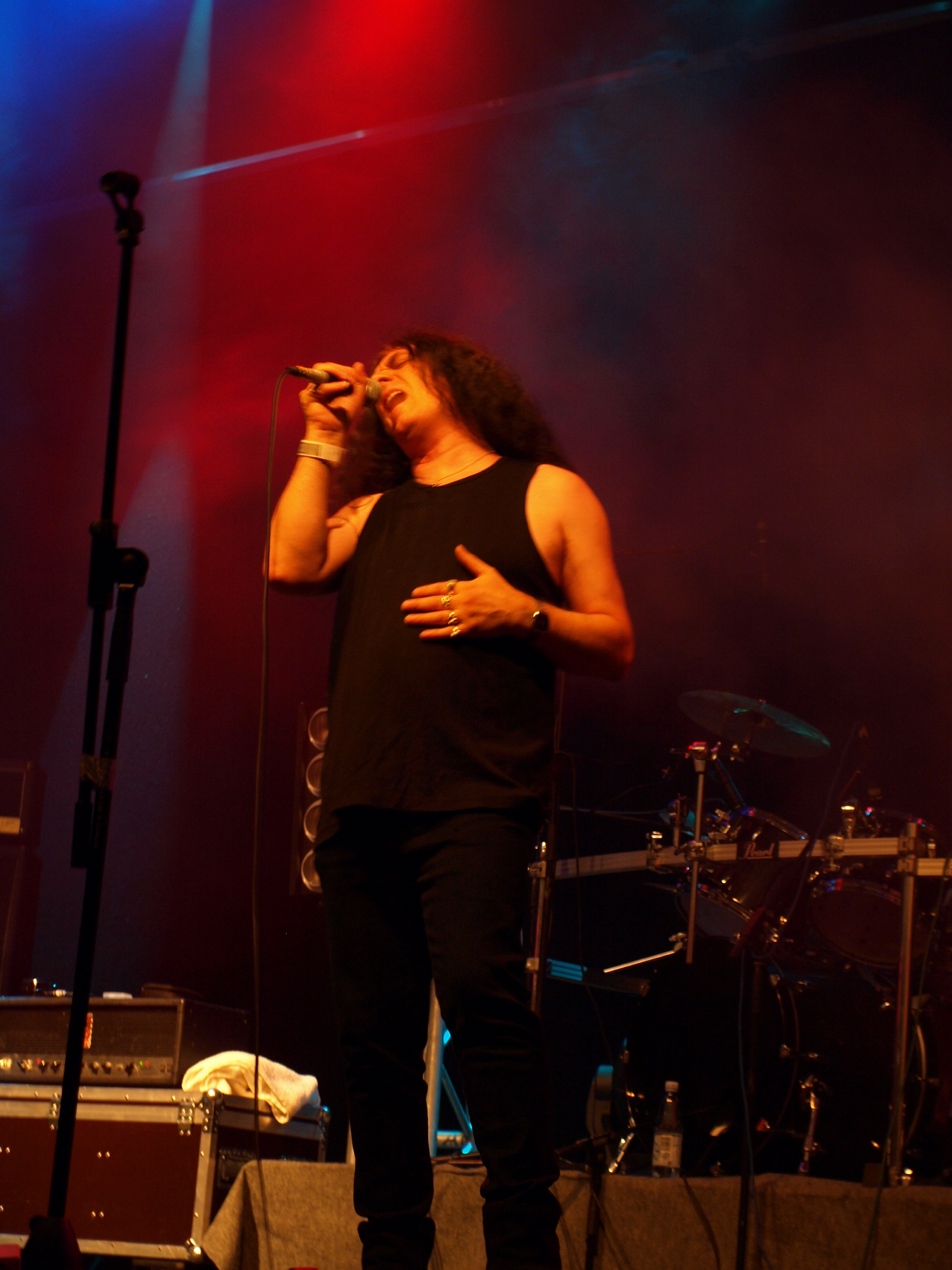
- Ross performing with Blitzkrieg in 2008

Background information
- Born: Brian Ross; 1954 (age 71–72); Durham, England
- Genres: Heavy metal
- Occupation: Musician
- Instruments: Vocals, keyboards
- Years active: 1980–present

Brian Ross (born 1954) is an English vocalist, who is best known as the frontman of heavy metal bands Satan, from 1983 to 1984, in 2004, and since 2011, and Blitzkrieg, since 1980.

He also performs as Alice Cooper in Alice Cooper's Nightmare, a tribute show in United Kingdom.

Ross's son, Alan, has been the guitarist of Blitzkrieg since 2012, as well as providing backing vocals on the album Back From Hell.

== Discography ==
=== With Satan ===
- Court in the Act (1983)
- Live in the Act (2004)
- Life Sentence (2013)
- Trail of Fire: Live in North America (2014)
- Atom by Atom (2015)
- Cruel Magic (2018)
- Earth Infernal (2022)
- Songs in Crimson (2024)

=== With Blitzkrieg ===
- A Time of Changes (1985)
- Unholy Trinity (1995)
- Ten (1996)
- The Mists of Avalon (1998)
- Absolute Power (2002)
- Absolutely Live (2003)
- Sins and Greed (2005)
- Theatre of the Damned (2007)
- Back From Hell (2013)
- A Time of Changes: 30th Anniversary Edition (2015)
- Judge Not! (2018)
- Blitzkrieg (2024)
