= Ted Weems =

American musician and bandleader (1901–1963)

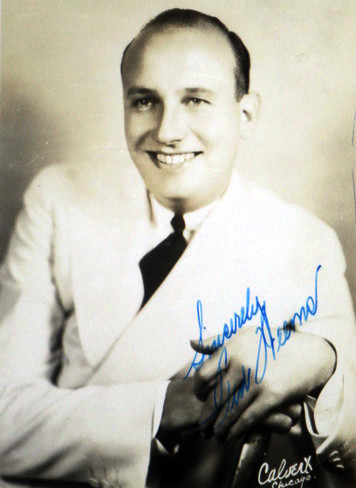
- Ted Weems publicity photo

Background information
- Also known as: Ted Weems
- Born: Wilfred Theodore Wemyes; September 26, 1901; Pitcairn, Pennsylvania, U.S.
- Origin: Philadelphia, Pennsylvania, U.S.
- Died: May 6, 1963 (aged 61) Tulsa, Oklahoma, U.S.
- Genres: Jazz, big band
- Occupation: Bandleader
- Instruments: Violin, trombone
- Years active: 1923–1953
- Labels: RCA Victor, Bluebird, Mercury

Wilfred Theodore Wemyes (September 26, 1901 – May 6, 1963), known professionally as Ted Weems, was an American bandleader and musician. Weems's work in music was recognized with a star on the Hollywood Walk of Fame.

== Biography ==
Born in Pitcairn, Pennsylvania, Weems learned to play the violin and trombone. Young Ted's start in music came when he entered a contest, hoping to win a pony. He won a violin instead and his parents arranged for music lessons. He was a graduate of Lincoln School in Pittsburgh. While still in school at Lincoln, Weems organized a band there, initially providing some instruments himself. His teacher offered young Ted and his band a penny each if they would play when the alarm sounded for fire drills. Weems kept the monies of the band and in turn charged each band member a penny for membership. He used the money to purchase better instruments than those the band started out with. When the family moved to Philadelphia, young Weems entered West Philadelphia High School. He joined the school's band and became its director.

He attended the University of Pennsylvania, where he and his brother Art organized a small dance band that became the "All American Band". The brothers sought the most talented college musicians for the group. The All American Band soon started receiving offers to perform in well-known hotels throughout the United States. Weems, who had originally intended to become a civil engineer, found himself being attracted to a musical career. His band had a contract to play four weeks at a Philadelphia restaurant; the owner was able to keep Weems and his band there for four months by making Ted a partner in his business. They were one of the bands that played at the inaugural ball of President Warren G Harding in March, 1921. Going professional in 1923, Weems toured for the MCA Corporation and began recording for the Victor Talking Machine Company. "Somebody Stole My Gal" became the band's first #1 hit in early 1924. It sold over one million copies, and was awarded a gold disc by the RIAA.

Weems recorded for Victor/RCA Victor from 1923 through 1933, although the final three sessions were released on RCA Victor's newly created Bluebird Records label. He then signed with Columbia for two sessions in 1934 and subsequently signed with Decca from 1936. Weems also co-wrote several popular songs: "The Martins and the McCoys", "Jig Time", "The One-Man Band", "Three Shif'less Skonks", and "Oh, Monah!", which he co-wrote with band member "Country" Washburn.

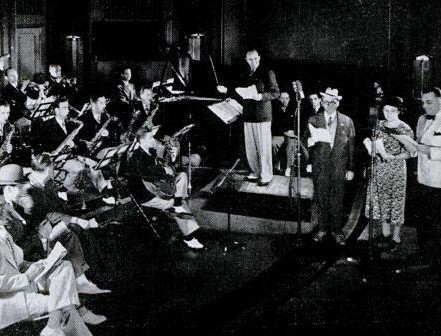
Ted Weems and his Orchestra on the Fibber McGee and Molly NBC Radio show, 1937.

Weems moved to Chicago with his band around 1928. The Ted Weems Orchestra had more chart success in 1929 with the novelty song "Piccolo Pete", which rewarded him with his second gold record, and the number one hit "The Man from the South". The band gained popularity in the 1930s, making regular radio broadcasts. These included Jack Benny's Canada Dry program on CBS and NBC during the early 1930s, and the Fibber McGee & Molly program in the late 1930s.

In 1936, the Ted Weems Orchestra gave young singer Perry Como his first national exposure; Como recorded with the band for Decca Records, beginning his long and successful career. Among Weems's other discoveries were whistler-singer Elmo Tanner, sax player and singer Red Ingle, Marilyn Maxwell, who left the band for an acting career; and arranger Joe Haymes, who created the band's unique jazz-novelty style. Weems also signed 14-year-old ventriloquist Paul Winchell to a contract, after seeing him with one of the Major Bowes touring companies. The first season of the Beat the Band radio show (1940–1941) included Weems and his orchestra as part of the cast.

In 1940, Weems and his orchestra were featured on Beat the Band on the NBC-Red radio network.

In November 1942, Ted Weems and his entire band enlisted in the United States Merchant Marine, directing the Merchant Marine Band. Reorganizing his big band in 1945, he made records for Mercury, including the hits "Peg O' My Heart" and "Mickey". However, the biggest hit of Weems's career was a reissue on his former Decca label: the Weems Orchestra's 1938 recording of "Heartaches" topped the national charts for 13 weeks.

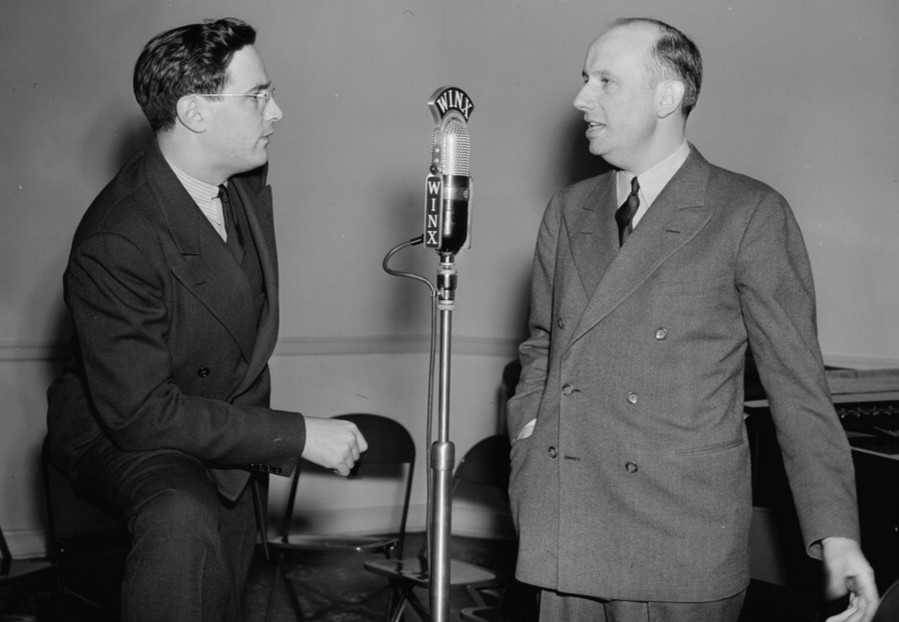
Ted Weems (right) with William P. Gottlieb, WINX Studio, Washington, D.C., ca. 1940.

For his August 4, 1933 session, Weems recorded six tunes, including "Heartaches". Since RCA Victor wanted the recording made quickly, Weems and his band had time for only one rehearsal session prior to this. Weems did not like the song at first, and decided to have Elmo Tanner whistle rather than use a vocalist. While rehearsing, someone came up with the idea of trying the song at a faster tempo than it was written for. The fast-tempo recording attracted very little attention after its release.

In 1938 Weems recorded a new "rhumba fox trot" version of "Heartaches" for Decca Records. This version again featured Elmo Tanner's whistling, and the tune was played briskly but not at the breakneck tempo of the 1933 version. In 1947, an overnight disc jockey named Kurt Webster, at station WBT in Charlotte, North Carolina, found the 1938 version in a box of old records he had recently received. He played it on the air and the radio station's phones never stopped ringing; the callers wanted to hear the song again. The calls continued, now joined by record stores wanting to know how to order copies of the record. Other radio markets began playing the song, prompting Decca to press new copies. Since the Weems orchestra had also recorded "Heartaches" for Victor, that company decided to re-release its own version of the song. Both labels shared credit on the charts. "Heartaches" topped the Hit Parade on April 19, 1947; nine years after it was recorded. In a 1960 interview, band member Elmo Tanner related that he and Weems received nothing for the reissue as both men had let their contracts expire while they were in the Merchant Marine.

The new-found popularity of the 1938 "Heartaches" came at a time when Weems was struggling to re-form his band; many former members had other music-related jobs, others were no longer interested in performing. Two of his band members were killed in World War II. Weems was then able to recruit new band members and was again being asked to play at the same venues as before the war. Ted Weems made front-page news in 1947 when he publicly repaid his debt to disc jockey Kurt Webster, who had revived "Heartaches" and thus Weems's career. Weems staged a benefit performance by his band on June 6, with all proceeds going to war veteran Webster. Decca cashed in on Weems's new popularity by reissuing another oldie, "I Wonder Who's Kissing Her Now" with vocals by Perry Como, which became another major chart hit.

Despite this sudden surge of popularity for Weems, the hits dried up after 1947. Weems continued touring until 1953. At that time, he accepted a disc jockey position in Memphis, Tennessee, later moving on to a management position with the Holiday Inn hotel chain. Perry Como played host to his old boss, Elmo Tanner, and three other Weems band members on his Perry Como's Kraft Music Hall show of October 18, 1961.

Ted Weems died of emphysema in Tulsa, Oklahoma, in 1963. He had been operating a talent agency in Dallas with his son which also served as his band's headquarters. Weems was in Tulsa with his band for an engagement the day he was taken ill. His son Ted Jr. led a revival band sporadically during the 1960s and 1970s.

== Selected Popular Recordings ==
- "Somebody Stole My Gal" (1924)
- "A Smile Will Go a Long, Long Way" (1924)
- "Blue Eyed Sally" (1925)
- "Love Bound" (1926)
- "Highways Are Happy Ways" (vocal by Parker Gibbs & Dusty Rhodes) (1927)
- "You're the Cream in My Coffee" (vocal Parker Gibbs) (1928)
- "Piccolo Pete" (vocal Parker Gibbs) (1929)
- "The Man from the South" (vocal by Art Jarrett & Parker Gibbs) (1930)
- "My Baby Just Cares for Me" (vocal by Art Jarrett) (1930)
- "Walkin' My Baby Back Home" (vocal Parker Gibbs) (1931)
- "Talkin' to Myself (vocal Red Ingle) (1934)
- "Three Shif'less Skonks" (1938)
- "Heartaches" (whistling by Elmo Tanner) (1947)
- "Peg o' My Heart" (vocal Bob Edwards) (1947)
- "I Wonder Who's Kissing Her Now" (vocal by Perry Como) (1947)
- "Mickey" (vocal by Bob Edwards & Elmo Tanner) (1947)
