= Mass media in Miami =

Mass media in Miami, Florida, United States, includes newspapers, magazines, Internet-based web sites, radio, television, and cinema. Florida produces some of its own media, while some comes from outside the state for Floridian consumption.

== Print ==
The Miami Metropolis newspaper began publication in May 1896, overseen initially by W.S. Graham and Wesley M. Featherby, and later by B.B. Tatum. In 1934, it became the Miami Daily News. The Herald newspaper began in 1899, followed by the Central News and Miami Weekly in 1920. Tropic Magazine began in 1914.

The first Miami Book Fair was held in 1984.

== Radio ==
The earliest radio stations in Miami were WQAM (est. 1923) and WIOD (est. 1926).

=== AM ===
- 560 WQAM Miami (Sports/Infinity)
- 610 WIOD Miami (Conservative talk)
- 670 WWFE Miami (Spanish conservative talk)
- 710 WAQI Miami (Spanish conservative talk)
- 790 WAXY Miami (Spanish conservative talk)
- 830 WACC Hialeah (Spanish religious)
- 880 WXBN Sweetwater (Black Information Network)
- 940 WINZ Miami (Sports/Fox)
- 980 WTPA Pompano Beach (Haitian Creole)
- 990 WMYM Miami (Spanish conservative talk–WWFE)
- 1040 WURN Miami (Spanish conservative talk)
- 1080 WQOS Coral Gables (Relevant Radio)
- 1140 WQBA Miami (Spanish sports/TUDN)
- 1170 WAVS Davie (World ethnic)
- 1210 WNMA Miami Springs (Spanish religious)
- 1260 WSUA Miami (Spanish conservative talk)
- 1320 WLQY Hollywood (Haitian Creole)
- 1360 WQVN North Miami (Haitian Creole)
- 1400 WFLL Fort Lauderdale (Brazilian Portuguese talk)
- 1430 WOIR Homestead (Spanish CCM)
- 1450 WKAT Miami (Spanish religious)
- 1470 WWNN Pompano Beach (Oldies/brokered)
- 1490 WMBM Miami Beach (Urban gospel)
- 1520 WEXY Wilton Manors (Gospel/brokered)
- 1550 WRHC Coral Gables (Spanish conservative talk–WWFE)
- 1580 WSRF Fort Lauderdale (Haitian Creole)
- 1700 WJCC Miami Springs (World ethnic)

=== FM ===
(*) — indicates a non-commercial radio station.
([RDS]) — indicates a supported by the Radio Data System.

- 88.1 WRGP Homestead (College/variety)*
- 88.3 WGNK Pennsuco (Spanish CCM)*
- 88.5 WKPX Sunrise (Educational/variety)*
- 88.9 WDNA Miami (Jazz)*
- 89.7 WMLV Miami (K-Love)*
- 90.3 WYBP Fort Lauderdale (BBN)*
- 90.5 WVUM Miami (College/alternative/EDM)*
- 90.9 WLFE Cutler Bay (Contemporary Christian)*
- 91.3 WLRN-FM Miami (NPR)* [RDS]
- 91.9 WMKL Hammocks (Radio Maria)*
- 92.3 WCMQ-FM Hialeah (Bilingual salsa/adult contemporary)
- 93.1 WFEZ Miami (Adult contemporary) [RDS]
- 93.9 WMIA-FM Miami Beach (Hot AC) [RDS]
- 94.9 WZTU Miami Beach (Spanish CHR) [RDS]
- 95.7 WRMA North Miami Beach (Cubatón)
- 96.5 WPOW Miami (Contemporary hits) [RDS]
- 97.3 WFLC Miami (Contemporary hits) [RDS]
- 98.3 WRTO-FM Goulds (Tropical)
- 99.1 WEDR Miami (Urban contemporary) [RDS]
- 99.9 WKIS Boca Raton (Country) [RDS]
- 100.7 WHYI-FM Fort Lauderdale (Contemporary hits) [RDS]
- 101.5 WLYF Miami (Adult contemporary) [RDS]
- 102.7 WMXJ Pompano Beach (Classic hits) [RDS]
- 103.5 WMIB Fort Lauderdale (Urban contemporary) [RDS]
- 104.3 WQAM-FM Miramar (Sports/Infinity) [RDS]
- 105.1 WHQT Coral Gables (Urban AC) [RDS]
- 105.9 WBGG-FM Fort Lauderdale (Classic rock) [RDS]
- 106.7 WXDJ Fort Lauderdale (Tropical)
- 107.1 WURN-FM Key Largo (Spanish conservative talk)
- 107.5 WAMR-FM Miami (Spanish AC/tropical)

=== Shortwave ===
- 9.955 WRMI Okeechobee "Radio Miami International"

=== Defunct ===
- WFAB—Miami (1962–1977)
- WFAW—Miami (1922–1923)
- WMJX—Miami (1948–1981)

== TV ==
The Miami–Fort Lauderdale region is currently ranked by Nielsen Media Research as the 16th-largest television market in the United States. Affiliations listed below are the primary subchannel of each respective station (displayed as x.1 via PSIP). Additional networks/diginets are also available on many of the following stations' secondary subchannels (x.2 and up).

=== Full-power ===
- 2 WPBT Miami (PBS)
- 4 WFOR-TV Miami (CBS)*
- 6 WTVJ Miami (NBC)*
- 7.1 WSVN Miami (Fox)
- 7.2 WSVN Miami (ABC)
- 8 WGEN-TV Key West (Estrella TV)*
- 10 WPLG Miami (Independent)
- 17 WLRN-TV Miami (PBS)
- 22 WSBS-TV Key West (Mega TV)*
- 23 WLTV-DT Miami (Univision)*
- 33 WBFS-TV Miami (The CW)
- 35 WPXM-TV Miami (Ion Television)*
- 39 WSFL-TV Miami (Independent)
- 42 WXEL-TV Boynton Beach (PBS) (Note: Nominally serving the West Palm Beach market, with a shared transmitter with WPBT in Andover, Florida.)
- 45 WHFT-TV Hollywood (TBN)*
- 51 WSCV Fort Lauderdale (Telemundo)*
- 63 WBEC-TV Boca Raton (Educational independent)
- 69 WAMI-DT Hollywood (UniMás)*

=== Low-power ===
- 3 WMDF-LD Miami (Independent)
- 8 WGEN-LD Miami (Estrella TV)*
- 8 WVFW-LD Miami (Estrella TV)*
- 11 WTXI-LD Miami (Diya TV, Infomercials)
- 13 WURH-CD Miami (The Health Channel)
- 16 W16CC-D Miami (Buzzr)
- 18 WDFL-LD/W18EU-D Miami (ABC)
- 22 WSBS-CD Miami (Mega TV)*
- 24 WDGT-LD Miami (CTNi)
- 28 WYMI-LD Summerland Key (Religious)
- 38 WBEH-CD Miami (Daystar)
- 41 WJAN-CD Miami (América TeVé)
- 41 WFUN-LD Miami (América TeVé)
- 43 W03BU-D Miami (Religious)
- 53 WLMF-LD Miami (LATV)
- 54 WEYS-LD Miami (Almavision)

(*) - indicates channel is a network owned-and-operated station

=== Streaming ===
- CBS News Miami
- NBC South Florida News
- Local 10+

=== Cable ===
- Bally Sports Florida
- Bally Sports Sun
- Telemiami

=== Defunct ===
- WDLP-CD—Pompano Beach (1992–2017)
- WETV—Key West (1989–1990)
- WGBS-TV—Miami (1953–1957)
- WITV—Fort Lauderdale (1953–1958)
- WPST-TV—Miami (1957–1961)

== See also ==
- Florida § Media
- Fort Lauderdale, Florida § Media and culture
- Gainesville, Florida § Media
- Media in Jacksonville, Florida
- Media in Key West, Florida
- Lakeland, Florida § Media
- Orlando, Florida § Media
- St. Petersburg, Florida § Media
- Tallahassee, Florida § Media
- Media in the Tampa Bay Area
- List of municipalities in Florida
- Category:Spanish-language mass media in Florida

== Bibliography ==
- "Florida: Miami". American Newspaper Directory. New York: George P. Rowell. 1900. p. 116. hdl:2027/umn.31951002273861a – via HathiTrust.
- "Florida: Miami". American Newspaper Annual & Directory. Philadelphia: N. W. Ayer & Son. 1922. p. 156. hdl:2027/umn.31951001295695n.
- Jack Alicoate, ed. (1939), "Florida: Miami", Radio Annual, New York: Radio Daily, pp. 219–220, OCLC 2459636 – via Internet Archive
- Federal Writers' Project (1941). "Newspapers and Radio". Planning Your Vacation in Florida: Miami and Dade County. American Guide Series. Northport, NY: Bacon, Percy & Daggett. pp. 91–96. ISBN 9780404579074.
- Nixon Smiley. Knights of the Fourth Estate: The Story of the Miami Herald. E.A. Seemann Publishing, 1974.
- Roy M. Fisher. The Trial of the First Amendment: Miami Herald vs. Tornillo. Freedom of Information Center, 1975.
- Paul G. Ashdown (1980). "WTVJ's Miami Crime War: A Television Crusade". Florida Historical Quarterly. 58 (4): 427–437. JSTOR 30140494.
- Nixon Smiley. The Miami Herald Front Pages, 1903–1983. H.N. Abrams, 1983.
- John Rothchild (1984). "Cuban Connection and the Gringo Press". Columbia Journalism Review. 23.
- Edna Buchanan. The Corpse Had a Familiar Face: Covering Miami, America's Hottest Beat. Random House, 1987.
- "Spanish-Language TV Called Biased", New York Times, July 24, 1989
- Gonzalo R. Soruco (1996). "Media in Miami". Cubans and the Mass Media in South Florida. University Press of Florida. pp. 34–53. ISBN 978-0-8130-1379-4.
- Doug Walker (1999), "Media's Role in Immigrant Adaptation: How First-year Haitians in Miami Use the Media", Journalism & Communication Monographs, vol. 1, Association for Education in Journalism and Mass Communication
- Martin Merzer, ed. The Miami Herald Report: Democracy Held Hostage. St. Martin's Press, 2001.
- John Sinclair (2003). "Hollywood of Latin America: Miami as Regional Center in Television Trade". Television & New Media. 4. doi:10.1177/1527476403254159. S2CID 145538531.
- Juliet Gill Pinto (2004). "Miami". In Christopher H. Sterling (ed.). Encyclopedia of Radio. New York: Fitzroy Dearborn. pp. 896–898. ISBN 978-1-135-45648-1.
- Gregory W. Bush (2005). "We Must Picture an 'Octopus': Anticommunism, Desegregation, and Local News in Miami, 1945-1960" (PDF). Tequesta. 65. Historical Association of Southern Florida. ISSN 0363-3705 – via Florida International University.
- Aurora Wallace. Newspapers and the Making of Modern America: A History. Greenwood Press, 2005. (Chapter 5: Florida in Chains: The Miami Herald and the Tampa Tribune)
- Gonzalo Soruco; Juliet Pinto (2010). "Mass Media Use Among South Florida Hispanics: An Intercultural Typology". Florida Communication Journal. 38. Florida Communication Association. ISSN 1050-3366.

== Images ==
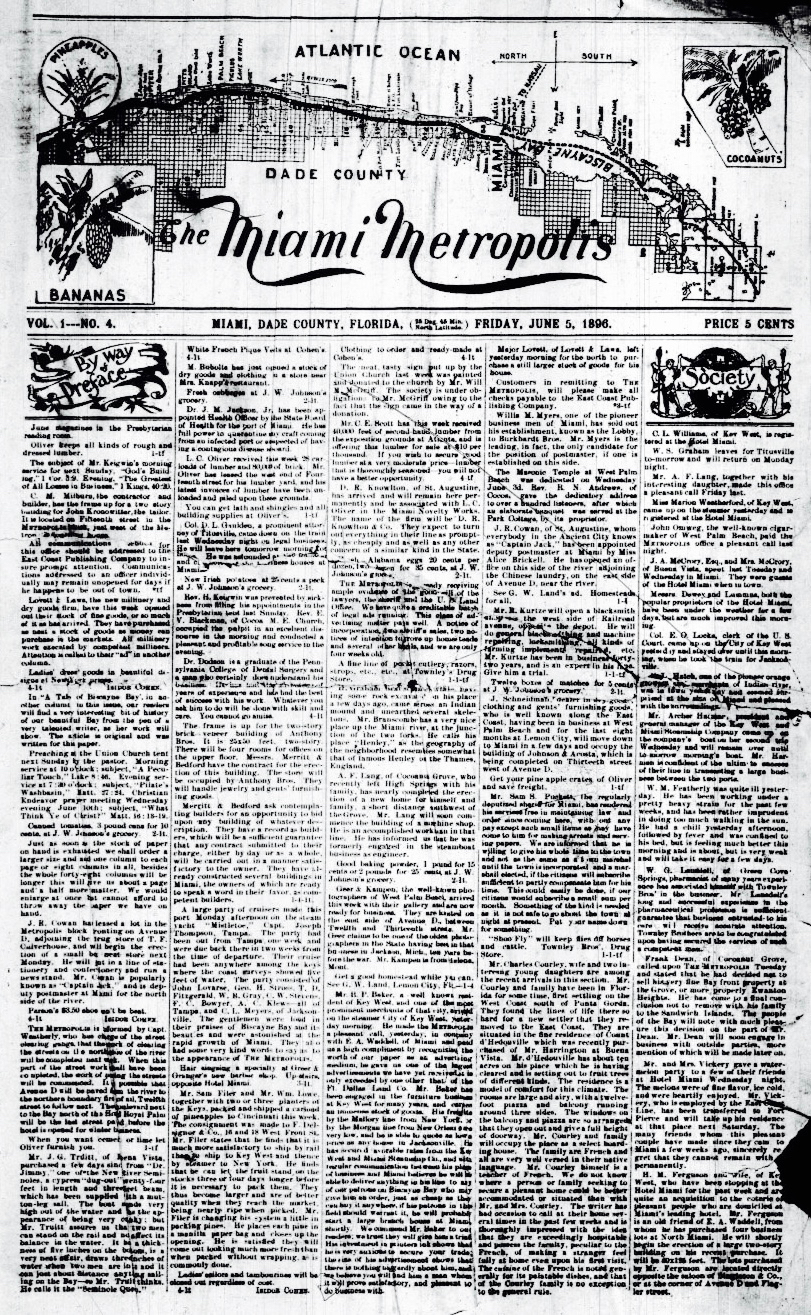
Miami Metropolis newspaper, 1896
