= GiGi Diaz =

Cuban-American life coach and radio personality

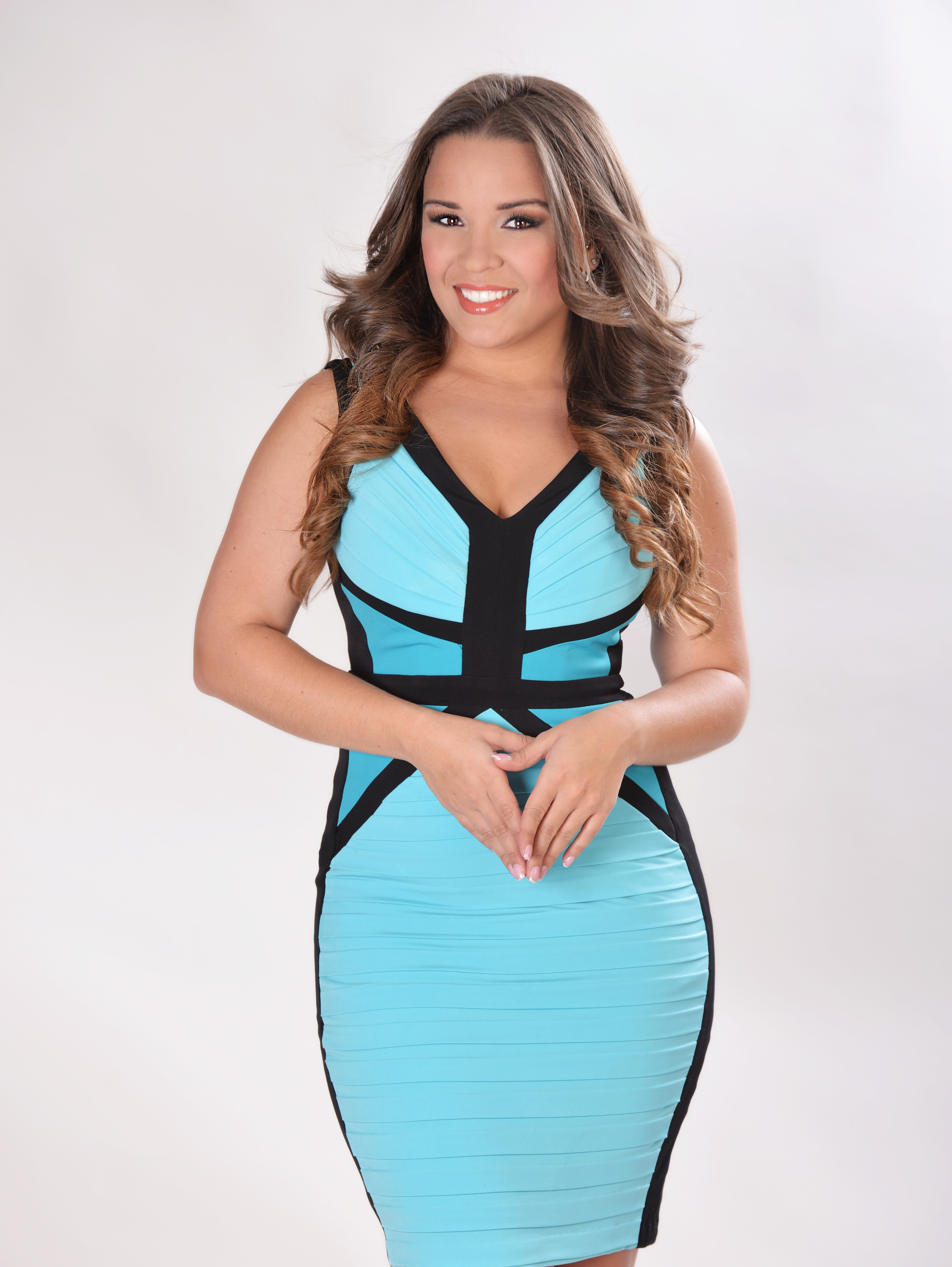
- Born: Cuba
- Education: Florida International University (B.A., M.A.); University of Miami
- Occupations: TV/Radio Personality & Life Coach
- Employer: iHeart Media
- Organization: Seizing Happy
- Known for: The Conscious Influencer
- Notable work: GiGi's Academy / Founder
- Website: www.gigidiaz.com

GiGi Diaz is a radio personality and life coach.

During her childhood in Cuba, Diaz was a child star on the television shows Dando Vueltas, Arco Iris Musical and Tato y Carmina. Upon migrating to the United States, Diaz won first place dancing on the TV show Sábado Gigante on Univision and from there became part of the show's dance team. During her teen years she became a local Miami celebrity at age 15 when she starred in the Santa's Enchanted Forest TV commercial. Since then he has continued her career as a journalist and TV/radio personality, an entrepreneur with her dance studio GiGi's Academy, and a life coach with her coaching company Seizing Happy. She uses the hashtag #TheConsciousInfluencer.

== Career ==
=== Journalism ===
Diaz became cofounder of the publication En Contacto Newspaper. There, she worked as graphic designer, writer, and often as sales rep, and had the opportunity to conduct interviews for her columns with celebrities such as Cristina Saralegui, Paulina Rubio, Pedro Moreno, Jencarlos Canela, and Jordi.. Additionally, she has been a columnist and contributing writer for a number of other publications including Imagen Magazine, Libertad Newspaper and Tiempo Nuevo Newspaper.

She completed a journalism internship with Telemundo Network where she worked with professionals such as Jose Diaz-Balart, Maria Celeste Arraras. She worked as Field Producer for the network's national news cast Noticiero Telemundo as well as Al Rojo Vivo for numerous pieces and live shots.

Diaz has been chosen to host television programs reporting on local news as well entertainment pieces; hosting; and interviewing personalities in the entertainment field R.K.M & Ken-Y, Tiempo Libre, Vacilos, and Tito Puente Jr. as well as politicians such as Governor Christine Todd Whitman, Mayor Julio Robaina, Mayor Carlos Hernandez and many others.

=== Radio ===
Diaz has been in the broadcast world from a young age, being interviewed on Clasica 92 at 15 years of age. She later became the on-air host and producer for Radio Disney's Kids Concern Show/Preocupaciones Familiares, the stations bilingual PSA program.

From 2014 to 2015 Diaz worked as on-air talent with Spanish Broadcasting Systems on a variety of day parts including middays, afternoon drive, and the morning show alongside Colombian radio personality Humberto Rodriguez "El Gato". From there she moved over to Total Traffic and Weather Network as traffic anchor covering a variety of stations from Tampa to Orlando, West Palm and the South Florida iHeart Radio stations such as Y100 Miami, Big1059, 939MIA and others. Within a year Diaz was offered an on-air position with iHeart Radio on 93.9FM and Mia 92.1.

=== GiGi’s Academy ===
In 2003 Diaz founded GiGi's Academy, located in Hialeah, Florida. A performing arts studio for children, in which students are taught art, modeling, musical theater, and styles of dance such as flamenco, salsa, ballet, belly dance, and jazz/hip hop fusion. The studio also offers services such as Quinces choreography and MC, solo and competition routines, and fashion show choreographies, as well as after-school care and dance summer camp.

GiGi's Academy has worked on television events such as Despierta America, Tropicama, Arrebatados, A las 7 con Fernando, Pellizcame que Estoy Soñando, and De Mañanita. On February 13, 2011, the academy won the "Step Up 2: the Streets" dance-off competition and their winning piece was aired on NBC 6 with Roxanne Vargas on February 14, 2011.

=== Reporter ===
Diaz joined the broadcast team at The Isle Casino Racing Pompano Park, starting with the 2010-2011 live harness racing season, as trackside reporter, producer and public liaison. She hosted and coordinated a variety of events including Pompano Park's 2010 Toys for Tots drive for the United States Marines.

Diaz has been producer and reporter for a variety of television shows including "Arrebatados" on America TeVe, Arte Mundo Latino, among others. Said experience lead her to direct and produce her own show called "Informate con GiGi" which she aired for a year before getting into radio.

Currently, Diaz is reporter, online content producer and talent for Hialeah Park Casino where she is responsible for creating commercials, promotional pieces and ads to be distributed throughout social media platforms as well for broadcast use.

== Awards ==
Diaz's awards include the Women in the Arts award for "Radio Personality of the Year" and "Dance studio of the Year" 2016. The WITA awards received extensive media coverage since the organization highlights accomplished professionals in the industry. In 2013 Diaz won "Reporter of the Year" with WITA.
