= WMGE =

WMGE may refer to:

- WMGE (AM), a radio station (1670 AM) licensed to serve Dry Branch, Georgia, United States
- WMYF (Portsmouth, New Hampshire), a defunct radio station (1380 AM), which held the call sign WMGE in 2016
- WZTU, a radio station (94.9 FM) licensed to serve Miami Beach, Florida, United States, known as WMGE from 2005 to 2016
- WMIB, a radio station (103.5 FM) licensed to serve Fort Lauderdale, Florida, known as WMGE from 1999 to 2003
- WLAI, a radio station (107.1 FM) licensed to serve Wilmore, Kentucky, United States, known as WMGE until 1995
