= China Valles =

American jazz radio broadcaster (1925–2014)

Charles Lomba "China" Valles (November 5, 1925 – December 17, 2014) was an American jazz radio broadcaster.

== Jazz authority and broadcaster ==
He was a noted jazz authority and prominent jazz personality in South Florida for several decades. Over the years, his programs aired on several Miami radio stations, including WFAB, WMBM, WGBS, WBUS, WTMI, and WDNA.

== Duke Ellington ==
Valles was also known by the sobriquet "The Maharajah, Purveyor of Swirls", a nickname given to him by his friend, Duke Ellington,

== Death ==
Valles died on December 17, 2014, in Miami, at the age of 89.
