= Basil Marceaux =

American politician

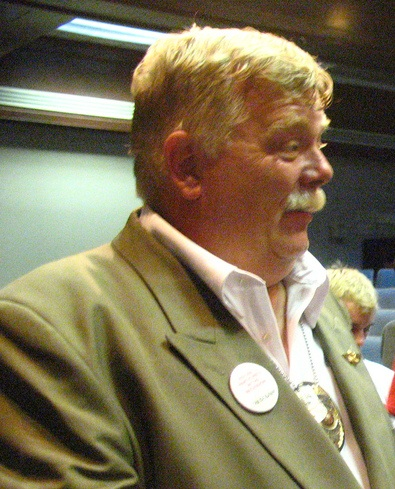
- Marceaux in Nashville, Tennessee on August 5, 2010
- Born: May 26, 1952 (age 74); Stroudsburg, Pennsylvania
- Occupations: United States Marine (Force Recon); Inventor; Entrepreneur; Importer-exporter; Historian
- Known for: Political candidacy Music video: "Come Christmas"
- Political party: Republican
- Spouse: Getona Deaver

Basil Marceaux, Sr. (born May 26, 1952) is an American perennial candidate who has on multiple occasions run for state and federal public office in Tennessee since at least 2002.

Most recently, he has filed as a candidate in the 2022 gubernatorial election as an independent and for the United States House of Representatives in Tennessee's 3rd congressional district in 2010. Owing in part to his unconventional viewpoints, his 2010 campaign for Governor became something of a media sensation.

Marceaux previously ran unsuccessfully as a candidate for the United States Senate and House of Representatives and ran unsuccessfully for Tennessee governor in 2002 as an independent candidate.

== Biography ==
Marceaux was born in Stroudsburg, Pennsylvania. He received an associate's degree in business administration from Edmondson Junior College in Chattanooga, and served as a United States Marine. According to his website, he was in the Marines from 1971 to 1973, serving in Force Recon and rising to the rank of Lance Corporal.

He has listed his professions as an inventor, entrepreneur, importer-exporter and historian. He is married to Getona Deaver and has two children. Marceaux is currently a resident of Soddy-Daisy, Tennessee.

According to the Hamilton County Criminal Court of Tennessee, Marceaux has been the defendant in 19 criminal cases. Many of the cases were concerning misdemeanor traffic violations. According to court records, in 7 of the 19 cases, Marceaux was found not guilty by reason of insanity. Marceaux himself confirmed that he was ordered to be hospitalized for observation at Tennessee's Moccasin Bend Mental Health Institute twice. Additionally, Marceaux has been found guilty in a case involving vandalism and possession of drug paraphernalia, and in one case involving theft. A Hamilton County Judge once noted that Marceaux "has filed many, many lawsuits in the court of General Sessions. Everyone there has always tried to treat him with respect and courtesy."

== Political candidacies ==
Before his 2010 candidacies for Governor and the U.S. House, Marceaux had previously run as a candidate for the Tennessee State Senate three times, the United States Senate once and the Governor of Tennessee in three separate elections.

=== 2010 candidacies ===
A 2010 Republican candidate for governor, Marceaux has campaigned for a recall of gun permits and the banning of law enforcement officers from charging suspects for anything except vehicle moving violations. He has promised to emphasize phonics in public schools and would require high school students to read the minutes from the United States House of Representatives.

His official campaign website on freesitenow.com states "VOTE FOR ME AND IF I WIN I WILL IMMUNE YOU FROM ALL STATE CRIMES FOR THE REST OF YOU LIFE!" His campaign video became a viral hit in late July 2010, airing on MSNBC, The Colbert Report, The Soup on television, as well as on the Bubba the Love Sponge, Paul and Young Ron, Keith and the Girl and The Monsters in the Morning radio shows. He was later invited onto Jimmy Kimmel Live! and interviewed on The Opie & Anthony Show.

Stephen Colbert of The Colbert Report discussed Marceaux's candidacy at length in three segments, and urged all his Tennessee viewers to vote for "Basil Marceaux-dot-com" (as Marceaux had repeatedly introduced himself in campaign videos) in the primary election, and told them to visit his website, "presumably, Basil Marceaux-dot-com-dot-com."

He was also interviewed on the Toucher and Rich show on 98.5 Sports Hub in Boston, where he said that, "If you kill someone you get murdered" and that "Once you're found guilty of murder we'll bury you under the prison for 50 years, and then put you up on Boot Hill."

A Mason-Dixon Polling & Research Inc. poll, taken before the popularity of Marceaux's video became widespread, predicted that Marceaux would receive one percent of the vote in the Republican gubernatorial primary.

Marceaux welcomed the media attention the campaign received, and he denied rumors that he was intoxicated when his campaign video was filmed. He stated that his speech is slurred because he has only three teeth and the news program's producers forced him to modify and shorten his statement as he was delivering it.

The day before the August 2010 primary, the Chattanooga Times Free Press reported on Marceaux's record in criminal court, which consisted primarily of misdemeanor traffic violations, including seven cases in which Marceaux was found not guilty by reason of insanity in 2005.

Marceaux faced Bill Haslam, Zach Wamp, Ron Ramsey and Joe Kirkpatrick in the Republican gubernatorial primary election on August 5, 2010. He finished fifth, receiving 3,505 votes (0.5% of the total).

In the 3rd congressional district Republican primary that same day, Marceaux received 655 votes (about 1% of the total), placing ninth in a field of eleven candidates. Chuck Fleischmann won the primary, edging out second-place finisher Robin Smith.

A Public Policy Polling poll showed that Marceaux would lose to President Barack Obama by 25 points if he were a candidate in the 2012 presidential election.

== Song and video ==
Marceaux created a Christmas song titled "Come Christmas" in December 2010 coupled with a music video, both of which soon went viral. Marceaux released the song to iTunes.
