= Neil Rogers =

American journalist (1942–2010)

- Born: Nelson Roger Behelfer; November 5, 1942; Rochester, New York, U.S.
- Died: December 24, 2010 (aged 68); Broward County, Florida, U.S.
- Other names: Uncle Neil, Neil God
- Presenting career
- Show: The Neil Rogers Show
- Stations: 1490 AM WBTA, Batavia, NY; 1310 AM WCGR, Canandaigua, NY; 1230 AM WSTR, Sturgis MI; 1560 AM WTPS, Kalamazoo; 1260 AM WALM, Albion MI; 1540 AM WMRR, Marshall MI; 1450 AM WSPB, Sarasota; 1290 AM WJNO, West Palm Beach; 1360 AM WKAT, Miami; 1510 AM WLAC, Nashville; 790 AM WNWS, Miami; 940 AM WINZ, Miami; 94.9 FM WZTA, Miami; 610 AM WIOD, Miami; 620 AM WSUN, St. Petersburg**; 1500 AM WKIZ, Key West**; 560 WQAM, Miami; 770 AM WJBX, Ft. Myers*; Channel 69, Miami; *Simulcast of WQAM; **Simulcast of WIOD; 1470 AM WWNN, Pompano Beach
- Time slot: Monday-Friday
- Style: Talk show host
- Country: United States
- Website: neilrogers.org

Neil Rogers (November 5, 1942 – December 24, 2010) was an American talk radio personality. Until his retirement on June 22, 2009, The Neil Rogers Show aired weekdays from 10am-2pm on 560 WQAM. It was consistently the top-rated show in the Miami-Ft. Lauderdale media market and had been since his Miami debut in 1976. Although he was not syndicated nationally or even regionally, Talkers magazine, the trade publication of talk radio, ranked Rogers at Number 15 on its 2006 list of the 100 most important personalities in the business. Rogers died at the age of 68 at the Vitas Hospice at Florida Medical Center in Broward County, Florida.

== Career ==
Rogers was born Nelson Roger Behelfer in Rochester, New York. Growing up there, he amused himself by announcing his own play-by-play while watching baseball on television. Years later he would do play-by-play for Miami Hurricanes baseball (1978-1982 on radio and 1983 on TV). In 1966 Rogers broadcast high school basketball in Marshall, Michigan at WMRR. His first radio job was at WBTA in Batavia, NY. He also worked as a music disc jockey at a small station, WCGR, in Canandaigua, New York He studied broadcasting at Michigan State University, but left shortly before he would have graduated to pursue his radio career. While in Michigan, Rogers broadcast football and basketball games for Albion College.

Over the next decade, Rogers worked at several stations in several states, including New York, Michigan, and Florida. Rogers served as Program Director at WSTR in Sturgis, Michigan from 1966-1967. In 1968, Rogers was program director for WTPS, which had a Hot 100 format serving Kalamazoo, Michigan. Later he ended up at WJNO AM in West Palm Beach starting in 1975, moving from WSPB 1450 AM in Sarasota where he started in Florida in 1973. Rogers subsequently lost his job in West Palm Beach and was headed to Yuma, Arizona when he called his mother from the road and learned that Miami-Ft. Lauderdale's WKAT (AM 1360) had offered him a job without application or audition. Rogers turned his car around and headed for Miami, debuting on WKAT on March 1, 1976. Rogers worked the 3 PM - 6 PM at WKAT for $225 a week. Prior to working for WKAT, Rogers worked two weekend shifts at WIOD, which was playing music at that time. By the end of 1976, he was one of the top-rated radio personalities in the market. Also while at WKAT, Neil owned a health food store in the San Souci area.

Nine months later, when singer Anita Bryant began a crusade to repeal Dade County's ordinance banning discrimination against homosexuals, Rogers responded by announcing on the air that he was homosexual on December 17, 1976. Although Bryant's campaign to repeal the ordinance was successful, Rogers' admission did nothing to hurt his radio career; indeed, his ratings steadily increased with every Arbitron period. Richard Casper hired Rogers away from WKAT in March 1978 to work at WNWS beginning in April 1978.

Starting on October 31, 1980, Neil Rogers did the 7-10 PM shift for WLAC in Nashville. He referred to the segment of his show with live calls as "Dialing for Neanderthals". He left WLAC after just one month. Neil accepted a job at WWDB in Philadelphia and had sent his furniture up there before Dick Casper convinced Rogers into coming back to WNWS.

Rogers returned to Miami radio on December 1, 1980, on WNWS 790 AM. By that time Rogers was unrivaled as the highest-rated talk-show host in Miami, dominating both the 18-24 and 25-54 demographics (the most coveted age ranges in the business). He was most well-known for his mean-spirited comedic style of responding to elderly callers.

Rogers moved to Miami's WINZ on March 1, 1984. After years of agitating for an earlier time slot, WINZ's owner, Guy Gannett Publishing, moved him to mornings on co-owned WZTA (Zeta-4) on October 12, 1987. Although ratings in the morning were immediate, Roger's long-simmering battle with station management boiled over, culminating with him moving to WIOD on November 7, 1988. During his tenure at WIOD, the station built a strong lineup of personalities anchored by Rogers' Midday 10 AM - 2 PM slot. Phil Hendrie, Jaz McKay and Randi Rhodes were part of this lineup, and have cited Rogers as both a friend and mentor. From WIOD he was simulcast in the Tampa Bay market on WSUN from June 22, 1992, to 1994. Rogers' last show on WIOD was on May 21, 1997. His last relocation was to 560 WQAM on December 30, 1997. Regardless of his station, he was consistently the top-rated personality in the Miami-Ft. Lauderdale market, prompting one Miami radio executive to call him "the most consistent performer among men 25-54 that this market has ever seen."

In June 1998, WAMI-TV ran Neil at Night, which was a 30-minute television show of The Neil Rogers Show. Neil at Night aired twice a night at 8:30 PM and 10:30 PM. The program consisted of filmed highlights of Neil's radio monologues and interactions with callers. Neil at Night was cancelled in January 1999. Earlier in his career, Neil had a television show on "Channel 51" WKID-TV that lasted for a few episodes.

Neil at Night

ESPN reporter Shannon Spake served briefly as an intern for The Neil Rogers Show in 1999.

Rogers also had a devoted audience in Europe and around the world who listened via the Internet.

He has been targeted from time to time by local activists who find him offensive; one, Jack Thompson, a former Miami attorney, unsuccessfully sued Rogers and his employers to remove him from the air. In 1989, the Hallandale City Commission voted to censure Neil Rogers for "offensive comments" that he had made about the elderly. Rogers had survived all such attacks, and indeed, many of them increased his popularity.

Starting in 2002, Rogers began broadcasting The Neil Rogers Show eight months a year from his Toronto apartment.

It was announced on April 14, 2008, that Rogers had agreed to a new 5-year contract on WQAM, which would have kept "Uncle Neil", as he was called by his fans, firmly on the air until 2013.

On the May 13, 2009, show it was announced but not confirmed that Rogers' longtime show producer and fill-in host Jorge Rodriguez was being fired by WQAM in a cost-cutting measure. Rogers' contract included the ability for him to choose his producer and no resolution was found by the end of the program even after Rogers called his agent on the air. Rodriguez's future with the show was a topic of interest in the South Florida media, including the Sun-Sentinel newspaper. Rodriguez's firing was confirmed by Rogers at the start of the May 14, 2009 program.

Rodriguez's firing drew a great response from Rogers' fans. Rodriguez later began The Jorge Rodriguez Show on SoFloRadio.com

Rodriguez was replaced by WQAM Deputy Program Director Lee "Flee" Feldman. Feldman stated that he worked on The Neil Rogers Show without any increase in his salary.

== Retirement ==
It was announced on June 22, 2009, that Rogers and Beasley Broadcast Miami reached an agreement where Rogers would no longer be featured on-air at WQAM but would consult for the station under a new agreement. Rogers' last show was on Friday, June 12, 2009. Neil Rogers then retired from on-air radio.

== Death ==
Rogers had been suffering from several health ailments in the last months of his life. His friend and attorney Norm Kent said the radio host suffered a stroke and heart attack in October and his condition had been declining since Thanksgiving. He died on December 24, 2010, at the age of 68.

In a Miami SunPost column eulogizing Rogers, Charles Branham-Bailey described his personality:

He could bite into you like a pit bull on the air, yet in his off-air persona, regard you with puppy dog gentility.

== National Radio Hall of Fame induction ==
On July 11, 2016, it was announced that the National Radio Hall of Fame nominating committee had voted to induct Rogers, along with three other individuals, for their contribution to the radio industry. Rogers' longtime friend and producer, Jorge Rodriguez, accepted the posthumous award.
