= WHDR =

WHDR may refer to:

- WHDR (FM), a defunct radio station (89.7 FM) formerly licensed to serve DeFuniak Springs, Florida, United States
- WFEZ (FM), a radio station (93.1 FM) licensed to serve Miami, Florida, which held the call sign WHDR from 2005 to 2010
