= WFLC =

Rhythmic hot adult contemporary radio station in Miami

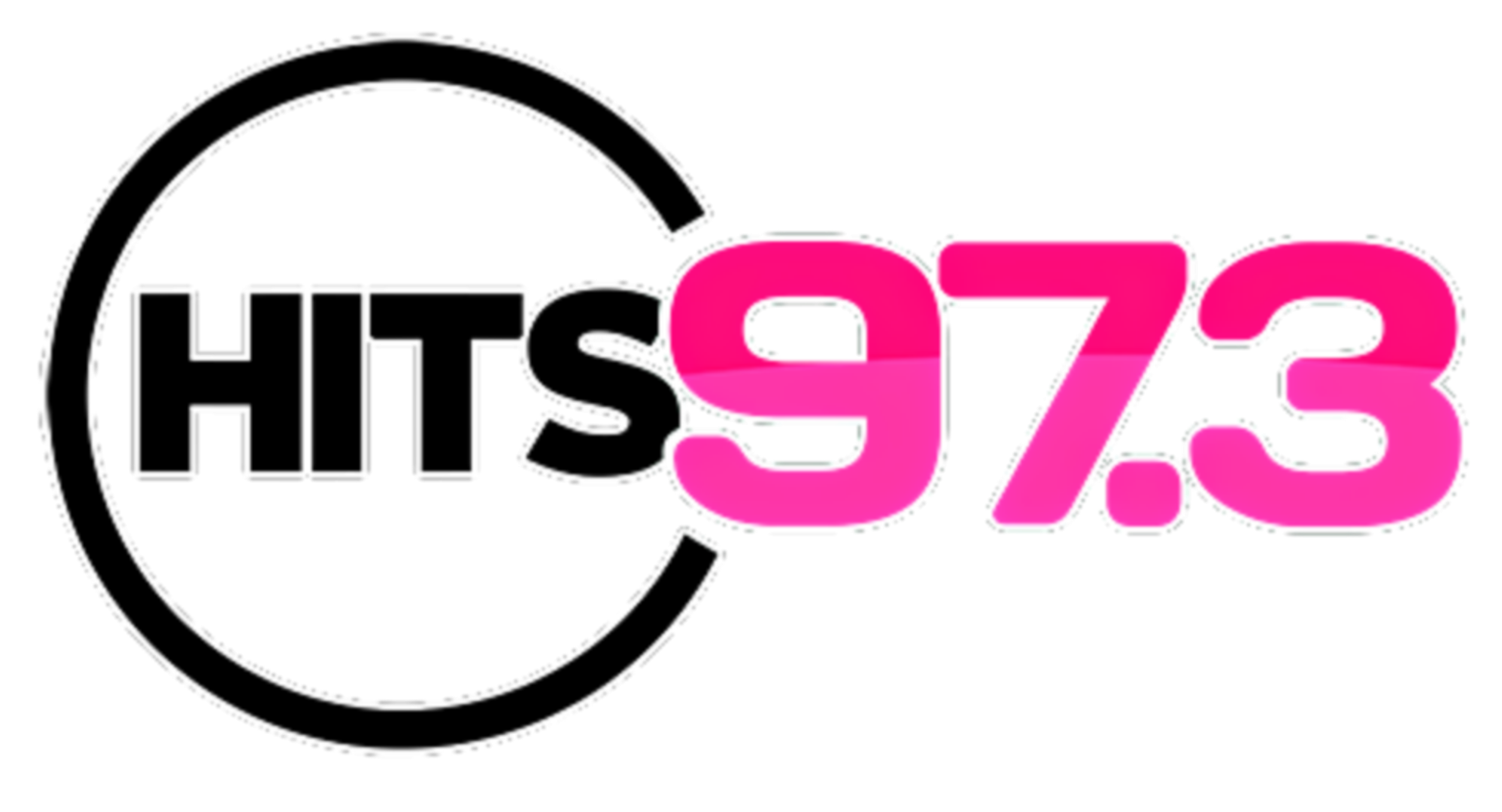
- Miami, Florida; United States
- Broadcast area: South Florida
- Frequency: 97.3 MHz (HD Radio)
- Branding: Hits 97.3

Programming
- Language: English
- Format: Rhythmic hot AC
- Subchannels: HD2: 97.3 The Coast (1980's hits)

Ownership
- Owner: Cox Media Group; (Cox Radio, LLC)
- Sister stations: WEDR; WFEZ; WHQT

History
- First air date: September 20, 1946
- Former call signs: WIOD-FM (1946–1956); WCKR-FM (1956–1962); WIOD-FM (1962–1971); WAIA (1971–1986); WGTR (1986–1990)
- Call sign meaning: Florida's Coast (former branding)

Technical information
- Licensing authority: FCC
- Facility ID: 72984
- Class: C
- ERP: 100,000 watts
- HAAT: 307 meters (1,007 ft)
- Transmitter coordinates: 25°58′3.3″N 80°12′33.2″W

Links
- Public license information: Public file; LMS
- Webcast: Listen live; Listen live (via Audacy); Listen live (via iHeartRadio)
- Website: www.hits973.com

WFLC (97.3 MHz, "Hits 97.3") is a radio station in Miami, Florida. Owned by Cox Media Group, it broadcasts a rhythmic hot AC format. WFLC's studios and offices are located on North 29th Avenue in Hollywood. The transmitter site is off NW 210 Street in Miami Gardens.

WFLC broadcasts in the HD Radio format. The HD-2 channel carries all-1980s hits. The station also formerly operated an HD-3 channel with country music.

== History ==
=== WIOD-FM, WCKR-FM ===
On September 20, 1946, the station signed on as WIOD-FM. It was the FM counterpart to WIOD and mostly simulcast its programs. The owner was the Isle of Dreams Broadcasting Corporation, reflected in its call sign. The studios were located on Collins Island in Biscayne Bay, giving the company its "Isle of Dreams" name. WIOD-FM was one of two FM stations going on the air in 1946 in Miami; the other, WQAM-FM, signed off in the 1950s, making WFLC Miami's oldest, continuously operating FM station.

In 1956, the Biscayne Television Corporation, a partnership of Cox Publishing, owner of The Miami News, and Knight Publishing, owner of The Miami Herald, launched WCKT-TV (now WSVN). The callsign represented Cox, Knight and Television. Biscayne Broadcasting also bought WIOD-AM-FM, changing their call signs to WCKR and WCKR-FM. Just as WIOD-AM-FM were network affiliates of NBC Radio, WCKT-TV was an NBC television affiliate.

In 1962, the Federal Communications Commission stripped the Cox-Knight partnership of its broadcast licenses due to violations of ethics and licensing rules when Cox-Knight sought to build the TV station. On January 1, 1963, the Miami Valley Broadcasting Corporation, which was a subsidiary of Cox, took over control of the two radio stations and returned the call signs to WIOD and WIOD-FM. An advertisement in Broadcasting Magazine said the stations provided "expertly programmed adult information and entertainment". The stations aired a mix of middle of the road music, news and talk shows, along with news and features from NBC Radio.

=== WAIA ===
In 1966, the simulcast with the AM ended; WIOD-FM adopted a beautiful music format, playing instrumental versions of pop music and Broadway and Hollywood tunes. In 1971, the station switched its callsign to WAIA, representing the coastal highway known as Florida State Road A1A. The station moved from instrumental beautiful music to all vocals, mixing middle of the road music with soft adult contemporary hits.

In the early 1980s, the station began making the presentation more upbeat and it stepped up the tempo of the music, moving to an adult contemporary format as "97 A1A".

=== WGTR ===
On Independence Day, 1986, at midnight, the station switched to album rock as WGTR. While WINZ-FM (now WZTU) had changed from Top 40 to a classic rock format to bring back the "Zeta" brand after about 5 1/2 years, WSHE was the key album rock station in a rapidly changing marketplace driven by Latino growth and "Miami Vice". When Cox Radio launched WGTR, it stole WSHE's "Herman and McBean" morning show. The result? The station calling itself "97 GTR" with the call sign standing for Guitar and a log with a monkey would sink WSHE, dropping it toward the bottom of the ratings after being near the top in 1985.

=== WFLC ===
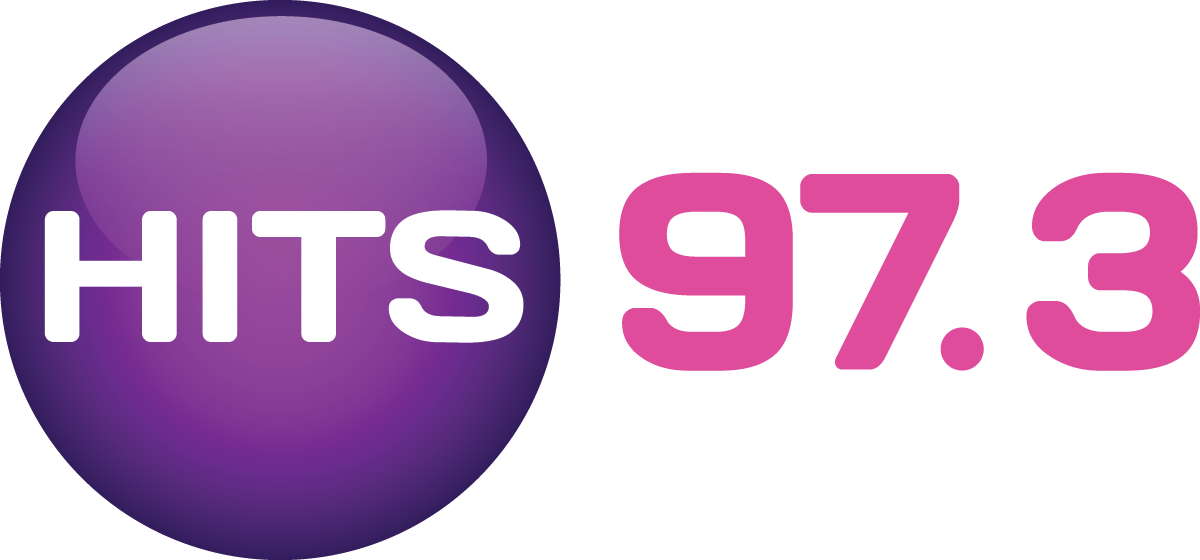
Logo used until June 2020.

As the 1990s began, and more socioeconomic changes had come to Northeast Miami-Dade County and much of Hialeah and Miami's southern suburbs, rock formats all began to fight for a smaller audience. Cox abandoned the fight to start an adult contemporary war that would last for nearly 25 years.

On May 11, 1990, Cox flipped the station to hot adult contemporary as WFLC, "Coast 97.3". The station positioned itself between contemporary hit radio (CHR) leader WHYI and soft music outlet WLYF. WFLC's hot AC format stayed in place for nearly 24 years, becoming famous for their "Totally 80s Weekends" under Director of Programming, Gary Williams.

On January 16, 2014, despite top 5 ratings ranking, the airstaff and social media of WFLC began teasing an announcement to come the following day, January 17, at 10 am. At that time, after playing "That's All" by Genesis, WFLC shifted to CHR as Hits 97.3, putting it in direct competition with WHYI. The first song as "Hits" was "Timber" by Miami native Pitbull, featuring Kesha.

On March 27, 2020, the station temporarily rebranded as 97.3 Quarantine Radio in reference to Florida's stay-at-home order due to the COVID-19 pandemic, adding commercial-free dance music mixshows at 9 a.m. and 5 p.m. daily ("Fit Mixes"). The Quarantine Radio branding was dropped in late-May, after which the station began promoting itself as being "under construction", and teasing an announcement on June 3. At that time, WFLC relaunched the Hits format with a new on-air lineup and morning show, while maintaining the existing CHR format. Despite the relaunch, the station failed to make any more traction than before, holding a 2.6 share in the Nielsen Audio Ratings for August 2021, significantly behind that of WHYI, but slightly ahead of WPOW.

On September 23, director of operations Jill Strada left WFLC as part of a series of layoffs by Cox Media. The following morning at 6 a.m., the station began stunting for six hours with a loop of songs containing the word "rhythm" in their titles; at noon, the station flipped to a rhythmic hot adult contemporary format under the Hits branding, now positioned as "The Rhythm of Miami". Mediabase still reported WFLC as a Top 40 station until around June 2022, when it officially moved to the hot AC panel.
