= Boca Raton News =

Newspaper in Boca Raton, Florida

- Type: Daily newspaper
- Owner: South Florida Media Group
- Founded: 1955
- Ceased publication: August 23, 2009 (print, online)
- Headquarters: Closed permanently
- ISSN: 0272-9822
- OCLC number: 232117398

The Boca Raton News, owned by the South Florida Media Group, was the local community newspaper of Boca Raton, Florida. The paper began publication on December 2, 1955, published by Robert L. and Lora S. Britt, and edited by Margert Olsson with a startup circulation of 1,200. In 1990, the Boca Raton News reported having 40,000 subscribers. Initially a weekly publication, it later began daily operation in 1986. However, by late 2008, the Boca Raton News scaled-back from publishing five times a week to thrice-weekly. The print publication ceased altogether in August 2009 and the agency initially continued on as an online-only news outlet.

== History ==
Tom Fleming, a local banker who later assisted with the establishment of Florida Atlantic University, promoted the idea of a Boca Raton newspaper. By late 1955, Boca Raton News, Inc. filed incorporation papers in Tallahassee, Florida. Robert L. and Lora S. Britt became the first publishers of the Boca Raton News, and Margert Olsson its first editor. With a startup circulation of 1,200, the Boca Raton News was initially printed weekly at the headquarters of the Delray Beach Journal, a newspaper owned by the Britts. Management-level employees at the Miami Herald purchased the Boca Raton News in 1963. The former, owned by Knight Ridder, gradually gained controlled over the Boca Raton News, completely so by 1969. In 1965, the paper hired its first full-time photographer, Jack Hutton, the same year that it expanded to publishing twice weekly. Two years later, the Boca Raton News had three weekly editions and then six weekly publications in 1974.

During the 1980s, the Boca Raton News briefly published two additional versions oriented towards news in Boynton Beach and Delray Beach, before closing those news bureaus in the early 1990s. The masthead became simply The News in April 1990 due to being circulated to approximately 40,000 subscribers from Boynton Beach to Deerfield Beach at the time. In 1997, the masthead was reverted to the Boca Raton News due to president and publisher Roger Coover's goal of "refocusing on Boca Raton." Later that year, the paper was sold to Community Newspaper Holdings (CNHI), as Knight-Ridder reported that the Boca Raton News was "not meeting profit goals", according to the Miami Herald. Also by 1997, the paper had launched a website: bocanews.com. The Audit Bureau of Circulations reported in 1998 that the paper had 13,247 paid subscribers. CNHI sold the Boca Raton News to Michael Martin in 1999.

Martin sold the paper to Neal R. Heller and Arthur Keiser in 2001. Craig Swill of Coral Springs' Our Town News bought the paper in 2005, which had also become part of South Florida Media Group. The Boca Raton News suspended publication for nearly one week in October that year after Hurricane Wilma caused a power outage and some damage. In late 2008, the paper scaled-back from publishing five times a week to thrice-weekly. On August 21, 2009, The Boca Raton News staff, composed of 24 people, was informed by its publisher that it would cease print publication on August 23, as distribution of the paper had become prohibitively expensive. Initially it continued as an online-only publication. There are several hyperlocal news sources in Boca Raton to replace this publication including the Boca Post and The Boca Raton Tribune.

== See also ==
- List of newspapers in Florida
- Mass media in Miami
