= WMIB =

Radio station in Fort Lauderdale, Florida

Coordinates: 25.968°N 80.209°W

- Fort Lauderdale, Florida; United States
- Broadcast area: South Florida
- Frequency: 103.5 MHz (HD Radio)
- Branding: 103.5 The Beat

Programming
- Language: English
- Format: Urban contemporary
- Subchannels: HD2: Simulcast of WINZ (Sports radio); HD3: Throwback 105.5 (Classic hip-hop)
- Affiliations: Premiere Networks

Ownership
- Owner: iHeartMedia; (iHM Licenses, LLC)
- Sister stations: WBGG-FM; WHYI-FM; WINZ; WIOD; WMIA-FM; WXBN; WZTU

History
- First air date: October 17, 1959
- Former call signs: WWIL-FM (1959–1968); WSRF-FM (1968–1972); WSHE (1972–1996); WPLL (1996–1999); WMGE (1999–2003); WSHE-FM (2012–2013)
- Call sign meaning: "Miami's Beat"

Technical information
- Licensing authority: FCC
- Facility ID: 67193
- Class: C
- ERP: 100,000 watts
- HAAT: 307 meters (1,007 ft)
- Translator: HD3: 105.5 W288DD (Tamarac)

Links
- Public license information: Public file; LMS
- Webcast: Listen live (via iHeartRadio); HD3: Listen live (via iHeartRadio)
- Website: 1035thebeat.iheart.com; HD3: throwbackmiami.iheart.com

WMIB (103.5 FM) is an urban contemporary radio station in South Florida. It is licensed to Fort Lauderdale, Florida, but it also serves Miami and the Miami metropolitan area. The station is owned by iHeartMedia, and the broadcast license is held by iHM Licenses, LLC. Its studios are located in Pembroke Pines, and its transmitter site is in Miami Gardens. WMIB competes with WEDR. WMIB broadcasts with 100,000 watts of effective radiated power and 1,007 feet of height above average terrain from the Guy Gannett broadcasting tower in Miami. Other stations on the tower are WQAM-FM, WHYI-FM, WMXJ, WHQT, WMIA-FM, WFLC, WFEZ, WEDR, and WZTU.

WMIB is licensed by the FCC to broadcast in the HD Radio (hybrid) format.

== History ==
=== WWIL-FM & WSRF-FM ===
The station began as WWIL-FM in 1959. It carried a beautiful music format until 1972, when it changed its call letters to WSRF-FM in 1968.

=== WSHE (first time) ===
In 1972, the station flipped to an album-rock format, branded as WSHE. Following its purchase by Paxson Communications in April 1996, WSHE dismissed all airstaff, dropped the rock format after 24 years, and began a 31-hour stunt loop of playing "Changes" by David Bowie, "Change" by Candlebox, and "It's the End of the World as We Know It (And I Feel Fine)" by R.E.M., while promoting a change to come at 1:03 p.m. on May 2.

=== WPLL ===
At that time, the station adopted a Modern AC format, first as "The New 103.5", then as "Planet Radio" with the new callsign WPLL. The first song "The New 103.5" was "Steppin' Out" by Joe Jackson.

=== WMGE ===
Another format change by the station's next and current owner, iHeartMedia (then called Clear Channel Communications), this time to the "Jammin' Oldies" format, resulted in another call letter/branding change to WMGE, "Mega 103.5", at midnight on June 30, 1999.

=== WMIB (first time) ===
The station flipped to "103.5 The Beat", WMIB, on December 31, 2002. For four years, WMIB was an urban contemporary-formatted station, with a stronger emphasis on hip hop. It was home to The Baka Boyz Morning Show from its launch until late 2005, when it was replaced by The Star And Buc Wild Morning Show, which was cancelled in spring 2006.

On October 5, 2006, WMIB modified its urban format to serve an adult audience and added the nationally syndicated Steve Harvey Morning Show. On-air personality Prince Markie Dee, from the group The Fat Boys, hosted the afternoon drive show. After two years as Urban AC, WMIB returned to Urban Contemporary in 2008.

On May 13, 2010, airstaffers at WMIB began posting on their Twitter pages that a format change was coming. Sources were reporting that WMIB would either flip to Talk or Spanish the following day. On May 14, at noon, after playing "Get Me Home" by Foxy Brown, the station flipped to Spanish Adult Contemporary as "103.5 SuperX". The first song as "SuperX" was "Where Do You Go" by No Mercy.

=== WSHE-FM (second time) ===
On May 23, 2012, WMIB fired its on-air staff. The next day, at 5 a.m., after playing Marc Anthony's "Me Haces Falta", WMIB flipped to adult hits as "She 103-5", returning the "She" branding to the frequency for the first time in 16 years. The first song on "She" was She's a Beauty by The Tubes. On May 31, WMIB changed their call letters to WSHE-FM. During its time as "She", the station leaned towards modern rock. On April 15, 2013, the station was rebranded as "Variety 103-5".

=== WMIB (second time) ===
On October 11, 2013, at 11 am, after playing "Waterfalls" by TLC, the station stunted for an hour with dance music as "Evolution 103.5", a format carried by its sister station W228BY, before flipping back to Urban at noon and returning to the "103.5 The Beat" moniker, this time with a hip-hop-intensive playlist. The first song after the relaunch was Waka Flocka Flame's freestyle version of "U.O.E.N.O." by Rocko. On October 24, 2013, WSHE changed their call letters back to WMIB. As of November 2013, it became an affiliate of The Breakfast Club, based on sister station WWPR-FM in New York.

== HD Radio ==
WMIB-HD2 formerly aired a Russian-language format known as "DaNu Radio." The format also airs on sister WWPR-HD2 in New York. In 2024, WMIB-HD2 flipped to a simulcast of WINZ.

On May 25, 2017 at 4 pm, WMIB signed on an HD3 sub-channel, and began airing a classic hip-hop format, branded "PK's Throwback 105.5" (simulcasting on translator W288DD FM 105.5), with "PK" standing for Papa Keith, the afternoon host on WMIB, and the voiceover of the new station. The first song on "Throwback" was "It's Your Birthday" by Miami native Luke.
