= WHQT =

Urban adult contemporary radio station in Coral Gables–Miami

Coordinates: 25.968°N 80.209°W

- Coral Gables, Florida; United States
- Broadcast area: South Florida
- Frequency: 105.1 MHz (HD Radio)
- Branding: Hot 105

Programming
- Language: English
- Format: Urban adult contemporary
- Subchannels: HD2: Gospel and inspirational

Ownership
- Owner: Cox Media Group; (Cox Radio, LLC)
- Sister stations: WEDR; WFLC; WFEZ

History
- First air date: November 15, 1958
- Former call signs: WVCG-FM (1958–1968); WYOR (1968–1983); WEZI (1983–1985)
- Call sign meaning: "Hot"

Technical information
- Licensing authority: FCC
- Facility ID: 72982
- Class: C0
- ERP: 100,000 watts
- HAAT: 307 meters (1,007 ft)

Links
- Public license information: Public file; LMS
- Webcast: Listen live; Listen live (via Audacy); Listen live (via iHeartRadio)
- Website: www.hot105fm.com

WHQT (105.1 FM, "Hot 105") is a commercial radio station owned by Cox Media Group and airing an urban adult contemporary radio format. The station is licensed to Coral Gables and it serves South Florida including the Miami-Fort Lauderdale-Hollywood radio market.

WHQT's studios and offices are located in Hollywood along with its sister stations WEDR, WFLC, and WFEZ. It is licensed as a Class C0 station with an effective radiated power (ERP) of 100,000 watts, broadcasting from a transmitter site in Miami Gardens, which also serves as the site for eleven other FM radio stations and five TV stations. The station uses HD Radio technology and offers contemporary Gospel music, branded as "Joy 105", on the HD2 channel.

"Hot 105" airs the nationally syndicated Rickey Smiley Morning Show from 6 to 10 am.

== History ==
=== Early years ===
On November 15, 1958, 105.1 FM signed on as WVCG-FM. It simulcast its AM sister station, 1070 WVCG (now 1080 WQOS), the "Voice of Coral Gables." WVCG was the first classical music station in Florida, and was the first FM station in Florida to broadcast in stereo. In 1968, the station became WYOR, "YOuR beautiful music station", airing mostly instrumental versions of popular songs and music from Broadway and Hollywood. WYOR promoted itself using an FM radio dial card, listing WYOR at 105.1 along with the dial positions of other FM stations in the Miami radio market. The card was updated each year.

The station enjoyed a grandfathered license, allowing it to transmit with an effective radiated power (ERP) of 160,000 watts while most Miami FM stations ran with much less power. Its signal really wasn't much stronger than other stations because its antenna was under sixty meters (200 feet) height above average terrain (HAAT). The grandfathered power ended when the transmitter was relocated to a 600-foot tower in downtown Miami in the early 1970s. The station's power then dropped to 100,000 watts, similar to other Miami FM outlets.

In 1983, the station was sold to EZ Communications, which changed its call sign to WEZI, and rebranded as "E-Z 105." The station continued with its easy listening format, although it began making the transition to a soft adult contemporary format by reducing the instrumentals and adding more vocals. By the mid-1980s, the audience for the easy listening format was aging, while advertisers prefer younger to middle-aged listeners.

=== Hot 105 ===
On January 10, 1985, at 6 am, the station changed to a hybrid CHR/Urban Contemporary (or "CHUrban") format as WHQT under the new moniker "Hot 105". "Yo Little Brother" by Nolan Thomas was the first song for WHQT. The station's initial musical slant was described as "triethnic", playing a mix of R&B, Freestyle Dance, Hip-Hop, and Pop hits, all targeted at Miami's young black, white, and Hispanic audience, but by 1987, WHQT moved a bit closer to Mainstream Top 40, playing a larger dose of contemporary artists popular at the time such as Rick Astley, Madonna and Def Leppard. Another notable feature of the station during this era was a no DJ music intensive daypart from 9 am to 5 pm, predating the current trend in automated jockless radio.

With fierce competition from Y100 and Power 96, Hot 105 dropped their highly successful Mainstream Top 40/CHUrban format and went into a full-fledged Urban Contemporary format in September 1988 with the new slogan The fresh new sound of Hot 105. The main competitor was soon to be future sister station, WEDR (99 Jamz). The two stations competed for the 18-49 year old African-American demographic until 1992, when WHQT evolved to Urban Adult Contemporary. Around that time, Cox purchased both stations, which led to the end of their competition.

For some time, Hot 105 was the only Adult R&B/Soul station in the market until October 2006, when it gained competition from WMIB, a former Hip Hop station that moved to Urban AC under the ownership of Clear Channel Communications (now iHeartMedia, Inc.). WMIB returned to Urban Contemporary in late 2008.

=== Tom Joyner ===
Hot 105 was one of the original affiliates of the nationally syndicated Tom Joyner Morning Show when it debuted in 1994. The show now has about 100 affiliates around the U.S. Joyner announced he would retire from the show in 2019.

=== NAB Radio Award ===
WHQT has been committed to public service and excellence in the Miami community for over three decades. WHQT has won the prestigious NAB Marconi Radio Award for "Urban Station of the Year" under Director of Branding and Programming Phil Michaels-Trueba, 4 times, starting in 2014, and then again in 2017, 2019, and most recently in 2023. Michaels-Trueba has been associated with Hot 105 on and off since 1991 when he started as an intern and rose through the ranks thru 1999 and returned as Program Director in March 2006. In 2023, Phil Michaels-Trueba was promoted to Director of Operations.

=== Former program directors ===
Previous program directors include Jeff Tyson, Bob McKay, Bill Tanner, Keith Isley, Hector Hannibal, Tony Kidd, Derrick Brown, Tony Fields and Duff Lindsey.
