= WMBM =

Urban gospel radio station in Miami Beach, Florida, United States

Miami Beach, Florida; United States
- Broadcast area: Miami area
- Frequency: 1490 kHz

Programming
- Format: Urban Gospel
- Affiliations: Westwood One

Ownership
- Owner: New Birth Broadcasting Corp. Inc.

History
- First air date: October 31, 1954 (as WAHR)
- Former call signs: WAHR (1954–1958); WMET (1958–1962); WSBH (1993–1995)
- Call sign meaning: Where Ministry Blesses Many

Technical information
- Licensing authority: FCC
- Facility ID: 40045
- Class: C
- Power: 1,000 watts full time
- Transmitter coordinates: 25°46′10.00″N 80°8′11.00″W

Links
- Public license information: Public file; LMS
- Website: wmbm.com

WMBM (1490 AM) is a radio station broadcasting a gospel format. Licensed to Miami Beach, Florida, United States, the station serves the Miami area. The station is currently owned by New Birth Broadcasting Corp. Inc. and features programming from Westwood One.

== History ==
=== WAHR ===
WAHR signed on the air October 31, 1954. Owned by and named for Alan Henry Rosenson, the station aired a continuous music format. Rosenson owned WLRD (93.9 FM), which changed its call letters to WAHR-FM in 1956.

The manager of the station hired a young man, Larry Zeiger, to perform miscellaneous clean-up tasks. When one of the station's announcers suddenly quit, Zeiger was put on the air; Simmons suggested that Zeiger's last name was too ethnic, so he became Larry King. King would become the station's sports director, leaving in 1958 for WKAT.

=== WMET ===
Rosenson sold WAHR-AM-FM to Community Service Broadcasters in 1958. After the $150,000 purchase, the new ownership—most of which hailed from Cincinnati—changed the call letters to WMET, continuing a format emphasizing news, sports and adult music. WMET eventually became a full-time Spanish-language outlet, the first in South Florida. In 1961, the owners of daytime-only station WMBM (1220 AM), Florida's first black radio station—which in turn had just absorbed the call letters and some talent of the previous WMBM at 790 AM—agreed to a deal with Latin Broadcasting Company to swap facilities. The deal was finalized and announced in March 1962; Consolidated Communications, which owned WMBM, paid $253,000 to acquire the WMET-AM-FM facility.

=== WMBM ===
On April 3, 1962, the WMET intellectual unit moved to 1220 kHz, and 1490 (and 93.9 FM) received a relocated WMBM. WMBM went on to develop a large and popular history as Miami's premier AM station for rhythm and blues, gospel, jazz and programming targeted to an African-American audience. Noted jazz broadcaster China Valles had a popular show on the station. In its 1960s heyday, the station attempted a Thanksgiving turkey giveaway which clogged the MacArthur Causeway with drivers from Overtown seeking free turkeys. Motivational speaker Les Brown was a disc jockey on WMBM.

In 1992, Eddie Margolis bought WMBM from his father. After a failed half-Haitian, half-gospel format, the station flipped to talk in 1993 and briefly adopted the call letters WSBH. On March 10, 1995, the station returned to a gospel format, as it had for much of the 1980s, and the WMBM call letters.
