= WINZ (AM) =

Radio station in Miami, Florida

- Miami, Florida; United States
- Broadcast area: South Florida
- Frequency: 940 kHz
- Branding: Fox Sports 940

Programming
- Format: Sports radio
- Affiliations: Fox Sports Radio; Florida Gators; Miami Dolphins; Miami Marlins

Ownership
- Owner: iHeartMedia; (iHM Licenses, LLC)
- Sister stations: WBGG-FM; WHYI-FM; WIOD; WMIA-FM; WMIB; WXBN; WZTU

History
- First air date: October 15, 1946
- Former call signs: WFVL (1946–1947); WINZ (1947–2002); WRFX (2002–2004)

Technical information
- Licensing authority: FCC
- Facility ID: 51977
- Class: B
- Power: 50,000 watts (day); 10,000 watts (night); 25,000 watts (night under STA)
- Transmitter coordinates: 25°57′37.3″N 080°16′12.2″W
- Repeater: 103.5 WMIB-HD2 (Fort Lauderdale)

Links
- Public license information: Public file; LMS
- Webcast: Listen live (via iHeartRadio)
- Website: foxsports940.iheart.com

WINZ (940 kHz) is a sports radio formatted AM radio station that serves Miami–Fort Lauderdale, Florida, and their suburbs. The station primarily airs syndicated programming from Fox Sports Radio with some local sports talk and game coverage. The station has managed to score ratings in the Ft. Myers-Naples radio market despite its transmitter being over 100 miles away.

WINZ's studios are located in Pembroke Pines and its transmitter site is in Miami Gardens.

== History ==
The station was originally a 3-tower directional day with 46,000 watts to protect the FCC monitoring station just to the north. Gannett management was successful in having the FCC monitoring stations moved to Vero Beach, which opened up the station for increased power. Later that year WINZ applied for and received the ability to broadcast during day with 50,000 watts non-directional. During nighttime hours (sunset to sunrise) the WINZ directional skywave pattern must not interfere with stations in Canada and Mexico. Those countries have Class A Clear Channel rights to the 940 kHz frequency. Those stations are XEQ in Mexico City, and a station in Montreal, CFNV.

On February 17, 1981, the Federal Communications Commission (FCC) granted WINZ special temporary authority to transmit with 25,000 watts at night instead of the 10,000 watts for which it is licensed. A station in Cuba causes interference and consequently a loss of service in some areas of WINZ's listening area. This authority has been renewed regularly since then.

From the late 1950s and into the early 1960s, WINZ went head-to-head with top 40 WQAM at night, featuring Bob Green, from 7 pm to 11 pm. When Green left the station, he was replaced by "Cousin Brucie" Bruce Morrow. Morrow left the station to begin a legendary career at WABC, in New York City. He later went on to SiriusXM and is now back at WABC. By coincidence, both WINZ and WQAM are sports radio stations today.

WINZ was an all-news radio station from June 18, 1975, until July 12, 2004, when WINZ became a progressive talk radio station. Former talk-hosts included Al Franken, Randi Rhodes, Mike Malloy, Stephanie Miller, Lionel, Neil Rogers, Thom Hartmann and Don Imus. Traffic reporters for WINZ were South Florida's traffic reporting veterans Trish Anderson in the 1980s, and George Sheldon from 1988 to 1997, then again from 2003 to 2006. Frank Mottek worked as an anchor and reporter for WINZ from 1981 to 1992, before joining CBS station KNX Los Angeles in 1992. From 1985 to 1991, he broadcast the live descriptions of all space shuttle launches for the CBS Radio Network which aired on WINZ. Before the station adopted progressive talk as its format, it was 940 Fox Sports Radio, a sports radio station that competed with WQAM and WAXY. On April 3, 2009, the format shifted back to sports as "The Sports Animal". The station's slogan today is "Miami's Sports Station".

WINZ is owned by iHeartMedia, the largest U.S. radio owner. iHeartMedia (as Clear Channel Communications) purchased the station from West Palm Beach-based media entrepreneur Bud Paxson. WINZ management changed in early 2007, from Peter Bolger to Ken Charles. New weekend shows included Clout with Richard Greene and 7 Days in America with new Air America Radio network co-owner Mark Green (no relation). Other local shows have been dropped recently, such as Radioactive Politics and The Nicole Sandler Show.

In 2008, Miami Heat (National Basketball Association) games moved back to WINZ from WIOD. One game will be simulcast monthly on 103.5 The Beat. WINZ previously carried Heat games from 1993 to 1996.

On April 2, 2009, it was reported on Radio-Info.com that the station would switch to sports the following day, making it the sixth sports station in Miami; this follows Clear Channel's trend of changing liberal talk formats (regardless of success) to its own Fox Sports network. The change took place at noon the following day, as "Doing Time with Ron Kuby" was interrupted by a skit in which Rush Limbaugh announced he had convinced Clear Channel to change the format of WINZ to sports, claiming that, as a conservative talk show host, he felt it was time for the station to go (and that he was a closet fan of the city's sports teams), and "AM 940, The Sports Animal" was born. Since the change of format, ratings for WINZ have dropped from a 1.0 in the Spring of 2009, to a 0.3 in April, a 0.6 in May, and a 0.5 in June, behind the sports station WAXY and WQAM.

The National Football League's Miami Dolphins announced on March 1, 2010, that it had entered an agreement with Clear Channel that would make WINZ and WBGG-FM flagship stations of the Dolphins Radio Network for the next six years.

On November 14, 2010, the Dolphins and Heat played on the same day at the same time. Per contract, WINZ aired the Dolphins game while another station had the Heat broadcast. Clear Channel then threatened to sue the Heat for breach of contract. Sometime after that, the Heat switched its flagship station to competing station WAXY. On November 6, 2013, WINZ announced that they were the new flagship station for the Miami Marlins starting with the 2014 season, ending a 5-year relationship with WAXY. In case of scheduling conflicts (particularly with Dolphins games), Marlins games are broadcast on sister station WIOD instead.

Most of the station's lineup is fed in from national feeds of Fox Sports Radio.

On September 22, 2021, WINZ rebranded as "Fox Sports 940", dropping remaining local hosts Jeff "DeFo" DeForrest and "The Greek", but keeping the live games from the Marlins and U of M.

On January 30, 2023, iHeartMedia announced it had picked up the radio broadcast rights to the Miami Dolphins (marking the fourth NFL team the company had signed with in the previous 2 years, alongside the Carolina Panthers, Green Bay Packers and Washington Commanders) and would place the team on a joint simulcast of WBGG-FM (which had previously been the team's broadcast home from 2010 to 2015) and WINZ. The stations will carry all Dolphins games, pre and post-game shows, and a weekly show with team and league personnel. The play-by-play team will remain the same with former Dolphin and WIOD morning host Jimmy Cefalo, former Dolphin and current WQAM morning host Joe Rose and former Dolphin Kim Bokamper.

On December 12, 2024, WINZ applied to the FCC to downgrade their operation to remain 50,000 watts daytime, 16 watts at night.
