= Edmondson Junior College =

For-profit college in Chattanooga, Tennessee

Edmondson Junior College was a two-year for-profit college in Chattanooga, Tennessee, that closed in July 1992. It was owned by Phillips College, Inc. As of 1993, Phillips owned and operated approximately 30 career and technical schools in the United States.

During federal fiscal year 1994–1995, six former employees of Edmondson Junior College pled guilty in Federal District Court to one count each of conspiracy to defraud the United States government in connection with the school's operation. A seventh employee pleaded guilty to a related charge. The guilty pleas resulted from a U.S. Department of Education investigation that found that Edmondson employees had allegedly instructed students to falsify financial aid applications and then had tried to cover up their illegal activities by altering records. One of Edmondson's former directors of admissions received a prison sentence and was ordered to pay $30,000 in restitution. The other six received lesser sentences.
