= The Paul and Young Ron Show =

American radio program

The Paul and Young Ron show
- Genre: Comedy, Talk
- Running time: 4 hours
- Country of origin: United States
- Home station: WBGG
- Starring: Paul Castronovo; Ron Brewer
- Website: http://www.paulandyoungron.com

The Paul & Young Ron Show was a morning radio program starring Paul Castronovo and "Young" Ron Brewer, broadcast on WBGG-FM in the Miami/Fort Lauderdale radio market, WZZR-FM in the West Palm Beach radio market, and for a time on Sun 103.1 in Key Largo and Sun 99.5 in Key West.

The program broadcast live from 6:00 a.m. until 10:00 a.m. on Monday through Friday with the final program airing on December 16, 2016. Brewer "retired" from the show with Castronovo continuing on as solo host.

== History ==
Ron Brewer was originally hired by Program Director Brian Krysz for mornings at WYBB Charleston SC. Krysz brought Brewer to WFYV Jacksonville to do middays for him and eventually brought him with him to WSHE to do news, pairing him with Paul Castronovo.

Castronovo and Brewer began their morning show on WSHE, Miami/Ft. Lauderdale in 1990. They then moved to WZTA, Miami Beach, and eventually settled on WBGG, Ft. Lauderdale. In late 2007, the show began simulcasting on West Palm Beach's WKGR. In early 2011, the show was switched from WKGR to WZZR in the West Palm Beach area.

On December 5, 2016, Ron Brewer announced his retirement from the broadcasting, making December 16, 2016, his final show. Brewer died April 3, 2024.

== Style ==
The staff includes ESPN's Dave Lamont, Hell's Kitchen/Iron Chef contestant Chef Ralph Pagano, and comedian Wil Shriner. The show is produced by former Kidd Kraddick producer and long time Dallas personality Steve Harmon.

Dom Irrera, Ralphie May, Billy Gardell, Lisa Lampanelli have all appeared multiple times on the show.

Past on-air staff included Kelly Craig, Steve Branzig, Robert Jenners, Tommy Owen, Craig Carmean, George Almeyda, Toast, OMG Mike, and Omelet.

== Charity ==
The Paul & Young Ron Show held a yearly charity drive. A good portion of the funds are raised at their Meatballs and Martinis Dinner held in December at Anthonys' Runway 84.

== Streaming ==
The Paul & Young Ron Show streamed live on both WBGG's and WZZR's websites. WBGG's stream offered a version of the show that was permitted to air indecent material that would not be able to be aired due to Federal Communications Commission (FCC) regulation, and the station made full podcasts of the show available for download on their web site or iTunes. Streaming video of live show broadcasts and pre-recorded video highlights were also available from the show's official site.
