= Miami SunPost =

Defunct local newspaper, USA

The Miami SunPost
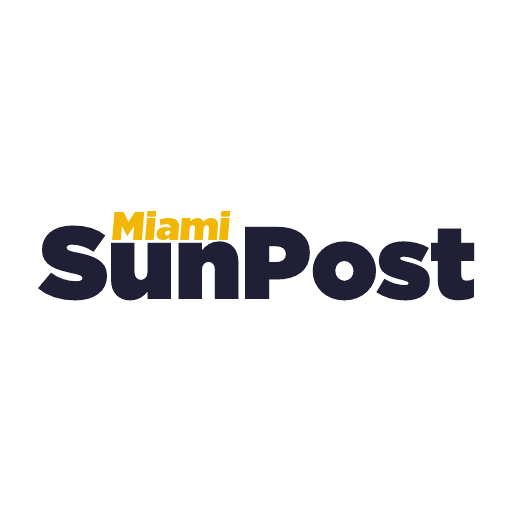

- March 15, 2012 cover
- Type: Defunct weekly
- Format: Tabloid
- Owner(s): SunPost Weekly, Inc.
- Founder(s): Felix & Jeannette Stark
- Publisher: Andrew Stark
- Editor: Andrew Stark
- Founded: 1985
- Ceased publication: 2014
- Headquarters: P.O. Box 191835; Miami Beach, Florida, 33119; USA
- Circulation: 45,000
- Website: miamisunpost.net

The Miami SunPost was a free weekly community-style newspaper published in Miami, Florida, and distributed in a print edition and an on-line edition every Thursday. The paper covered local news, politics, business, culture, society, and the arts. It circulated in Miami Beach, North Bay Village, Surfside, Bay Harbor Islands, Bal Harbour, Sunny Isles Beach, North Miami, North Miami Beach, Aventura, Miami's Design District, Wynwood, Upper Eastside, and Miami Shores. It ceased publishing in 2014.

Writers, columnists, and contributors included columnists Alejandro Arce and Charles Branham-Bailey; news writers Frank Maradiaga and Michael Sasser; social editor Jeannette Stark; "411" columnist Mary Jo Almeida-Shore; "Go" columnist Maryanne Salvat; theater reviewer Tony Guzman; literary reviewer John Hood; film critics Ruben Rosario, Crissa-Jean Chappell and George Capewell; and music reviewer Vala Kodish. Erik Bojnansky is a former executive editor. Former staff writers have included Rebecca Wakefield, Angie Hargot, Lee Molloy, Anne Newport Royall and Arthur Carl "A. C." Weinstein.

The paper issued annual special issues including the SunPost "Best Of the Beaches," recognizing the best places and businesses in South Florida in several categories, and the "SunPost Top 50 People," recognizing local citizens for notable achievements and contributions.

== History ==
The SunPost was founded by publisher emeritus Felix Stark (1929-1995). Stark, owner of a chain of papers in his native South Africa, bought the daily Sun Reporter in 1979. In 1985 he started the SunPost, which became the longest-running weekly newspaper in South Florida.

The newspaper never missed a weekly print issue even on the day founder Felix Stark was buried. An article written by the Miami New Times, the Sunpost’s direct competitor, in March 2009 mistakenly attributed the closing of the paper based on a front page obituary to long time columnist A.C Weinstein. It remained in print until 2014.

=== "Save Miami Beach" campaign ===
The SunPost won a September 1997 "Laurel" by the Columbia Journalism Review for the coverage of the "Save Miami Beach" campaign and referendum to curb the size of waterfront construction in the city. The paper was recognized for

"keeping its beam on a shadowy deal. When, without any public discussion, the city [of Miami Beach] agreed to adjust its zoning regulations on a $321 million stretch of waterfront property owned by a controversial foreign developer who planned to transform it into a towering 'mini-metropolis' of unlimited height, the local power establishment -- including The Miami Herald -- lined up in warm support. In contrast, when a group of outraged citizens began collecting signatures for a petition that would refer such 'upzoning' requests to a public vote, the SunPost took on the lonely job of reporting on its progress. The paper staunchly resisted the pressures of real-estate advertisers, lobbyists, and city hall, as well as a million-dollar p.r. campaign of misinformation. Two years later, on June 3, when the question of who should decide on the development of what's left of the precious waterfront finally went to a referendum, the SunPost was able to report on a tremendous upset in Dade County politics: the people had won. (In late July [1997], the developer, Thomas Kramer, was fined $323,000 by the Federal Election Commission for making illegal contributions to the Florida state GOP.)"
