= WEDR =

Urban contemporary radio station in Miami

Coordinates: 25.968°N 80.209°W

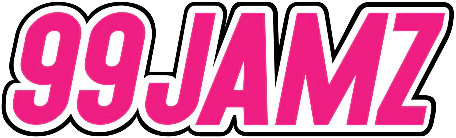
- Miami, Florida; United States
- Broadcast area: South Florida and some of the Caribbean
- Frequency: 99.1 MHz (HD Radio)
- RDS: 99JAMZ MIAMI
- Branding: 99 Jamz

Programming
- Language: English
- Format: Urban contemporary
- Subchannels: HD2: Xtreme hip hop

Ownership
- Owner: Cox Media Group; (Cox Radio, LLC)
- Sister stations: WFLC; WFEZ; WHQT

History
- First air date: May 18, 1963
- Call sign meaning: Eurith D. Rivers (former Georgia Governor, same person WGOV-FM Valdosta, Georgia is named for)

Technical information
- Licensing authority: FCC
- Facility ID: 71418
- Class: C1
- ERP: 93,000 watts
- HAAT: 309 meters (1,014 ft)

Links
- Public license information: Public file; LMS
- Webcast: Listen live; Listen live (via Audacy); Listen live (via iHeartRadio)
- Website: www.99jamzmiami.com

WEDR (99.1 FM, "99 Jamz") is a radio station serving the South Florida region and licensed to Miami, Florida. WEDR has an unusually wide music selection for an urban contemporary-formatted radio station that ranges from typical hip-hop and R&B to afro beat. This is because South Florida is a very diversified region that has various music tastes. WEDR's studio is located in Hollywood, Florida. The station is owned by Cox Media Group alongside sister stations WHQT, WFEZ and WFLC.

WEDR has an unusually shaped coverage area due to the station's decision to move its antenna from a class C to a class C1 on a new tower near Miami Gardens. This change was made primarily to avoid interfering with adjacent frequencies that serve southwestern Florida. It also began broadcasting in IBOC digital radio, using the HD Radio system from iBiquity in Summer 2005.

== History ==
1963 – The WEDR call letters have been in South Florida since 1963 when the station's then owner Ed Rivers acquired them from an AM radio station in Birmingham, Alabama. WEDR-FM had rock and country music formats. In the late 1960s, WEDR was a progressive (underground) rock station playing music by bands like Jethro Tull and Pink Floyd.

1970 – WEDR adopts a black format. The station had a weak signal that couldn't cover all of Dade county, but it fared well because it was the only black station in the market.

1988 – WHQT drops its pop/dance format and adopts an Urban Contemporary format. According to the Miami Herald, "WEDR dipped to a low ranking of 24th in the Miami-Fort Lauderdale market, and was eulogized as an outmoded, black-run David squashed beneath the foot of a corporate white Goliath."

Former logo

1990 – WEDR changed slogans from "Starforce 99" to "99 JAMZ", an Urban Contemporary with a playlist that ranged from R&B, soul, and rap to reggae on the weekends.

April 21, 1990 – The station's signal was increased from 16 kilowatts at 175 feet to 92 kilowatts at 1,014 feet. 99 Jamz becomes a factor in the West Palm Beach-Boca Raton market. The signal reaches as far as the Caribbean.

1992 – 99 Jamz becomes the top rated station in the Miami-Ft. Lauderdale market. Traffic Reporting for WEDR was handled by George Sheldon from 1990 to 1997.

2003 – Program Director and morning drive host, James T, migrates to sister station WHQT. James T. had been at WEDR for 20 years. WEDR began to skew more towards current format being a Mainstream Urban with the slogan "99 JAMZ, South Florida's Number One For All of Today's Hip Hop and R&B", then to "99 JAMZ, South Florida's Number One For Even More Of Today's Hip Hop and R&B" to compete with it new crosstown rival, Clear Channel-owned WMIB, "103.5 the Beat" (now an adult-hits format radio station). However, they do still play slower R&B and Classic Soul songs during Night JAMZ show in the overnight hours, despite most of them played on sister station WHQT. As a result of the change, Cedric Hollywood then hired radio Veteran Lorenzo "Ice-Tea" Thomas from the Washington, DC Market to do the Afternoon Jump-Off. Today, WEDR is exclusively rivaled at WPOW (Power 96).

July 2004 – 99 Jamz launches the Big Lip Bandit Morning Show featuring Supa Cindy and Benji Brown (produced by Marcus "Wiiz" Johnson)

2005 – 99 Jamz kicks-off the highly anticipated, number one night show in South Florida "The Take Over" with K. Foxx and DJ Khaled. In July 2009, K. Foxx left to do Morning's for New York's Hot 97.

October 2006 – WEDR's General Manager announces, Derrick Baker as Program Director of 99 Jamz

March 2008 – 99 Jamz is NOW known as "99Jamz, South Florida's ONLY Station for Hip Hop and R&B." WEDR continues to dominant the South Florida Market, with format changes from former competitor WMIB, what is now a Spanish station.

July 2008 – 99 Jamz launches the nationally syndicated "Rickey Smiley Morning Show" with Ebony Steele, HeadKrack, Gary, Rock T and Special K, with Miss Kimmy, Benji Brown and Marcus E. Johnson still producing on the local end. Big Lip Bandit was fired and no longer with the station.

2009 – WEDR's General Manager, Jerry Rushin moves to Cox Media Groups "Market Manager"

2015, 99 JAMZ is #1 in the South Florida Market and continues to dominate the competition in PPM.

2020 99 Jamz moves away from syndicated morning show. As of January 6, 2020, Big Mack and Dj Nasty 305 will produce the “TNT” Trick and Trina Show.

2022, The PAC Jam Morning show replaces Trick and Trina in the mornings.

== Parts of countries where it has broadcast area ==
- Bahamas
- Cuba

== Programming ==
Notable programming includes The Morning Hustle with Kyle and L’orel weekday mornings. Other notable weekday programming includes Middays with K Foxx, Afternoons with DJ Nasty 305, The Turn Up Partnas with DJ Hercules and Lucky C on Nights.

Special Friday night programming includes The Bashment Explosion with King Waggy Tee. Notable weekend programming includes The Nick Cannon Countdown show on Saturday Mornings. on Sunday Mornings, Sunday Morning Gospel with Maestro Powell & Wendell Ford
