= WDNA =

Jazz music public radio station in Miami

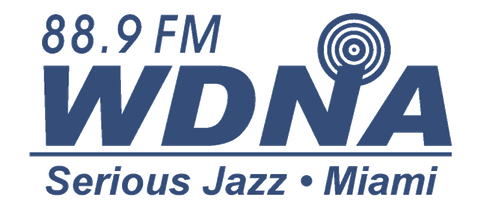
- Miami, Florida; United States
- Broadcast area: Miami-Dade
- Frequency: 88.9 MHz
- Branding: 88.9FM WDNA

Programming
- Format: Jazz
- Affiliations: BBC World Service, PRI

Ownership
- Owner: Bascomb Memorial Broadcasting Foundation

History
- Founded: 1977
- First air date: June 15, 1980

Technical information
- Licensing authority: FCC
- Class: C2
- ERP: 7,400 watts
- HAAT: 349 meters (1,145 ft)
- Transmitter coordinates: 25.540°N 80.468°W

Links
- Public license information: Public file; LMS
- Webcast: Listen
- Website: wdnaradio.org

WDNA is the callsign of a class C2 listener supported public radio station operating on 88.9 MHz in Miami, Florida, licensed in 1977 by the FCC to the Bascomb Memorial Broadcasting Foundation, Inc., a non-profit organization. WDNA is the market's first public radio station not run by any government agency. It is affiliated with Public Radio International. The format is a mix of straight-ahead jazz, Latin jazz, world music, and talk. BBC World Service newscasts are heard atop each hour.

== See also ==
- List of jazz radio stations in the United States
- List of community radio stations in the United States
