= WXBN (AM) =

Black Information Network radio station in Sweetwater, Florida, United States

- Sweetwater, Florida; United States
- Broadcast area: Miami–Fort Lauderdale
- Frequency: 880 kHz
- Branding: Miami's BIN 880

Programming
- Format: Black-oriented news
- Affiliations: Black Information Network

Ownership
- Owner: iHeartMedia, Inc.; (iHM Licenses, LLC)
- Sister stations: WBGG-FM, WINZ, WIOD, WMIA-FM, WMIB, WZTU

History
- First air date: October 7, 2008; 17 years ago
- Former call signs: WZAB (2008–2021)
- Call sign meaning: Black Information Network

Technical information
- Licensing authority: FCC
- Facility ID: 21763
- Class: B
- Power: 4,000 watts (day); 5,000 watts (night)
- Transmitter coordinates: 25°44′57.4″N 80°32′49.2″W

Links
- Public license information: Public file; LMS
- Webcast: Listen Live
- Website: miami.binnews.com

WXBN (880 kHz) is a commercial AM radio station licensed to Sweetwater, Florida, and serving the Miami–Fort Lauderdale radio market. It is owned by iHeartMedia, Inc., and airs a black-oriented news format as an affiliate of the co-owned Black Information Network.

880 AM is a United States clear-channel frequency reserved for Class A station WHSQ in New York City. WXBN uses a highly directional antenna array (8 towers) to prevent interference to WHSQ's nighttime skywave signal. The transmitter is off the Tamiami Trail (U.S. Route 41) in Everglades, Florida.

== History ==
=== Florida City Radio ===
A construction permit was granted to Florida City Radio by the Federal Communications Commission (FCC) on February 18, 2008, to start this station. The call letters WZAB were issued on July 15, 2008. But the station did not go on the air until Salem Communications began its local marketing agreement (LMA) with Florida City Radio to operate the station.

WZAB made its debut on October 7, 2008, airing a business talk radio format as "880 The Biz". Florida City Radio soon sold the station to Salem outright for $1.4 million.

=== Catholic programming ===
On July 25, 2019, Salem Media Group agreed to sell WZAB and WKAT in the Miami market, as well as WLCC and WWMI in the Tampa Bay market, to Immaculate Heart Media, Inc. for more than $8.2 million. The sale closed on September 30, 2019.

WZAB began airing Catholic religious programming with the sale. But the Miami area also has a Catholic station on 1080 AM, WQOS in Coral Gables. The religious format on 880 AM lasted a little over a year.

=== Black Information Network ===
iHeartMedia began operating WZAB under a local marketing agreement (LMA) on October 1, 2020, with the intention of making it Miami's Black Information Network outlet. It was part of a deal in which WZAB would be swapped to iHeart in exchange for KKDD in San Bernardino, California, W292DH in Pittsburgh, and $1 million.

Following a day of carrying historical speeches, WZAB began carrying BIN programming on October 2. Effective November 30, 2020, iHeartMedia acquired WZAB. The call sign was changed to WXBN on March 3, 2021.
