= WBGG-FM =

Classic rock radio station in Fort Lauderdale, Florida

- Fort Lauderdale, Florida; United States
- Broadcast area: South Florida
- Frequency: 105.9 MHz (HD Radio)
- Branding: Big 105.9

Programming
- Language: English
- Format: Classic rock
- Subchannels: HD2: News–talk (WIOD simulcast); HD3: Pride Radio
- Affiliations: Miami Dolphins

Ownership
- Owner: iHeartMedia; (iHM Licenses, LLC)
- Sister stations: WHYI-FM; WINZ; WIOD; WMIA-FM; WMIB; WXBN; WZTU

History
- First air date: July 1960
- Former call signs: WFLM (1960–1970); WIXX-FM (1970–1971); WAXY (1971–1983); WAXY-FM (1983–1994)
- Call sign meaning: "Big"

Technical information
- Licensing authority: FCC
- Facility ID: 11965
- Class: C0
- ERP: 100,000 watts
- HAAT: 314 meters (1,030 ft)
- Transmitter coordinates: 25°59′35.3″N 80°10′26.2″W

Links
- Public license information: Public file; LMS
- Webcast: Listen live (via iHeartRadio)
- Website: big1059.iheart.com

WBGG-FM (105.9 MHz) is a commercial radio station licensed to Fort Lauderdale, Florida, and serving the Miami-Ft. Lauderdale media market. Owned by iHeartMedia, the station airs a classic rock radio format. WBGG's studios are located in Pembroke Pines and its transmitter site is off Fifth Street in Pembroke Park.

WBGG is licensed for HD Radio and carries the news/talk format of sister station WIOD AM 610 on its HD2 channel and Pride Radio on its HD3 channel.

== History ==
=== WFLM, WIXX-FM, WAXY ===
The station first signed on the air in July 1960, as WFLM, Broward County's first all-stereo station, with an easy listening format. It was sold to the owners of WIXX (1520 AM; today WEXY), at first simulcasting country music with WIXX 1520 as WIXX-FM, the AM was daytime only. During this time WIXX-FM signed off at midnight. The station purchased an automation system and switched its call letters to WAXY in 1970 airing the syndicated format "Hitparade '70 and '71 In 1973 RKO General purchased WAXY. The combo was WEXY-WAXY after the AM switched to a contemporary format. When the FM was sold to RKO General, The AM switched to gospel music.

In 1973, under RKO General ownership, the station aired the syndicated "Classic Gold" format, but flipped to a live contemporary format then back to automated oldies in 1975. Four years later in 1979, the station dropped oldies and flipped to adult contemporary. In 1990, RKO sold WAXY-FM to Ackerley Communications, an outdoor advertising company, which later sold the station to Clear Channel Communications after the Federal Communications Commission relaxed its rules against one company owning numerous stations in the same market. In March 1991, WAXY-FM rebranded as "Mix 105.9". On January 17, 1992, WAXY-FM dropped the AC format and began stunting with a loop of various versions of "Louie, Louie". On January 20, at 6 a.m., the station flipped to a locally staffed oldies format as simply "WAXY 106".

=== WBGG-FM ===
Clear Channel Communications (now iHeartMedia) acquired WAXY-FM in 1994, and changed its call sign to WBGG-FM on September 1. The final quarter-hour of music was delivered by DJ Miguel Lombana and consisted of "It's the Same Old Song" by the Four Tops, "The End" by The Doors and "The Long and Winding Road" by The Beatles (which was an inside gag and reference to Stuart Elliott and his signing off of 96X WMJX years earlier). The station went dark for one minute and signed back on the air at 12:01 a.m. as "The New Big 106". (The WAXY call sign is now used by an unrelated AM station in the Miami market at 790 kHz).

Initially, BIG 106 started out as a 1970s hits station. By mid-1995, it was calling itself a classic hits station while still playing mostly 1970s music. By mid-1996, it evolved to a classic rock format. In 2005, the station changed its branding from "BIG 106" to "BIG 105.9".

Between 2010 and 2015, the station served as the FM and de facto flagship station for broadcasts of the Miami Dolphins football team; after 2015, these games would move to a joint simulcast of WQAM and WKIS. WBGG would regain the rights on January 30, 2023, following a new agreement between iHeart and the team; the games will be shared with WINZ (AM) and the stations will carry all Dolphins games, pre and post-game shows, and a weekly show with team and league personnel. The play-by-play team will remain the same with former Dolphin and WIOD morning host Jimmy Cefalo, former Dolphin and current WQAM morning host Joe Rose and former Dolphin Kim Bokamper.

In December 2024, the station's format shifted from classic rock back to classic hits, focusing on a wider variety of music from the 1980s and 1990s, though it continues to lean primarily toward classic rock. The station adapted a new slogan, "Miami's Greatest Hits".

==== Howard Stern ====
From September 1994 until January 2004, it aired the syndicated Howard Stern Show for morning drive time before dropping the show in the wake of the Super Bowl XXXVIII halftime show controversy and a wave of stricter Federal Communications Commission obscenity regulation. In April 2004, the FCC fined Clear Channel Communications $495,000 for broadcasting allegedly indecent material on the Stern show. Subsequently, Clear Channel dropped Stern from WBGG and five other stations.

To fill the morning talk slot, in May 2004, Clear Channel moved Paul & Young Ron from co-owned WZTA. (Lex and Terry took over the morning show at WZTA, but lost that outlet for their syndicated program when that station switched formats to Hispanic urban in February 2005).

In December 2016, Young Ron retired, leaving Paul Castronovo as the morning host. Castronovo's show continues to be a popular program in South Florida.
