= WIOD =

News/talk radio station in Miami

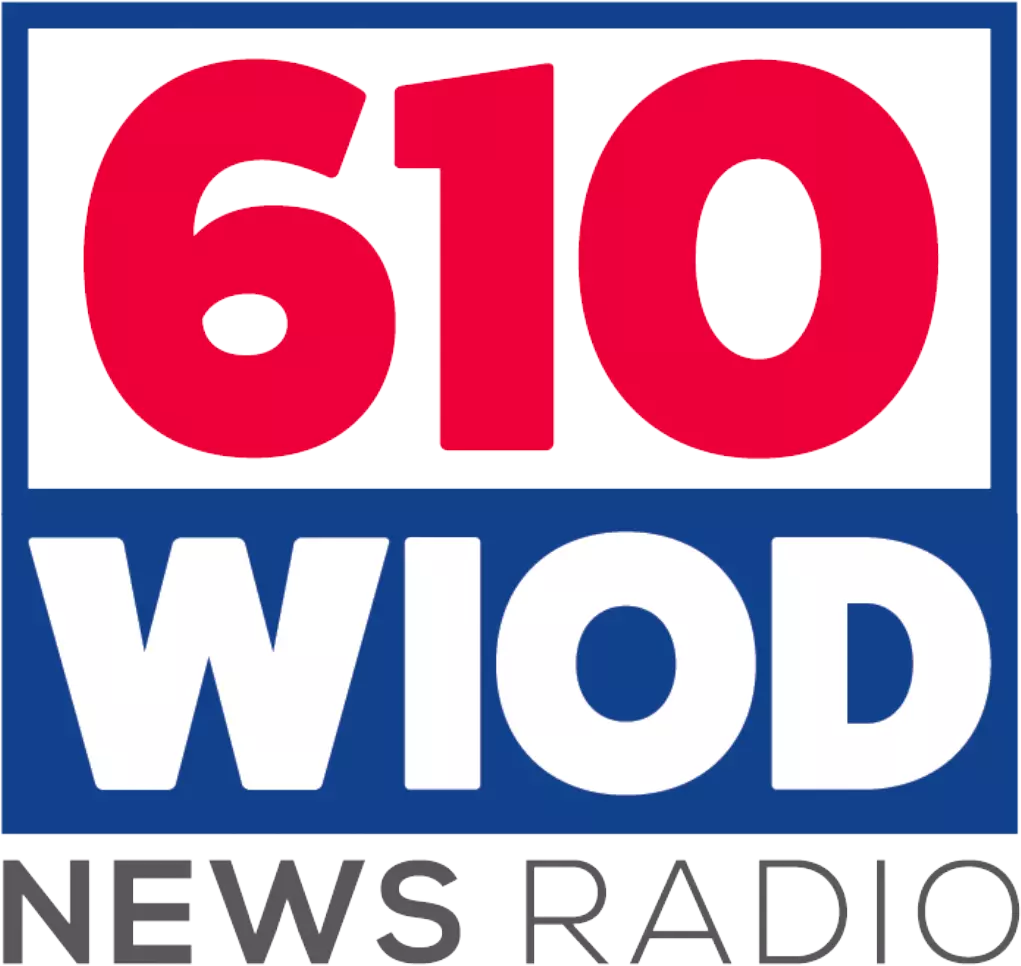
- Miami, Florida; United States
- Broadcast area: South Florida; Miami metropolitan area; Miami-Dade County
- Frequency: 610 kHz
- Branding: Newsradio 610 WIOD

Programming
- Language: English
- Format: Talk radio
- Affiliations: ABC News Radio; Accuweather; Bloomberg Radio; Compass Media Networks; Premiere Networks; WTVJ

Ownership
- Owner: iHeartMedia; (iHM Licenses, LLC)
- Sister stations: WBGG-FM; WHYI-FM; WINZ; WMIA-FM; WMIB; WXBN; WZTU

History
- First air date: January 18, 1926
- Former call signs: WIOD (1926-1929); WIOD-WMBF (1929-1940); WIOD (1940-1956); WCKR (1956–1963)
- Call sign meaning: "Wonderful Isle Of Dreams" (original station location)

Technical information
- Licensing authority: FCC
- Facility ID: 14242
- Class: B
- Power: 50,000 watts (day); 20,000 watts (night)
- Transmitter coordinates: 25°42′40.4″N 80°28′30.2″W
- Repeater: 105.9 WBGG-FM HD2 (Fort Lauderdale)

Links
- Public license information: Public file; LMS
- Webcast: Listen live (via iHeartRadio)
- Website: wiod.iheart.com

WIOD (610 AM) is a commercial radio station in Miami, serving South Florida. It airs a talk radio format and is owned by iHeartMedia, The studios are on SW 145th Avenue in Pembroke Pines. WIOD's transmitter site is on Krome Avenue in West End, Florida. WIOD is powered at 50,000 watts by day and 20,000 watts at night. It uses a directional antenna with a four-tower array.

WIOD is also heard on the HD2 subchannel of sister station 105.9 WBGG-FM in Fort Lauderdale.

== Programming ==
Weekdays on WIOD begin with two Florida-based talk shows, wake-ups with Ryan Gorman (from co-owned WFLA in Tampa) and late mornings with station veteran Manny Munoz. The rest of the schedule is made up of nationally syndicated shows, mostly from co-owned Premiere Networks: The Clay Travis and Buck Sexton Show, The Sean Hannity Show, The Glenn Beck Radio Program, The Jesse Kelly Show, Coast to Coast AM with George Noory, and from Compass Media Networks, This Morning, America's First News with Gordon Deal.

On weekends, specialty shows are heard on money, health, retirement, cars and pets, some of which are paid brokered programming. Weekend syndicated shows include Armstrong & Getty, The Ben Ferguson Show and Sunday Nights with Bill Cunningham. In June 2024, WIOD began syndicating The Josh Hammer Show on weekends. Most hours begin with an update from ABC News Radio. Accuweather supplies forecasts and the station has a news sharing arrangement with WTVJ channel 6.

== History ==
=== Establishment ===
Experimental broadcasts by Carl Graham Fisher, a Miami Beach developer, began in the spring of 1925. The station was licensed on January 9, 1926, and formally signed on the air on January 18, 1926. Fisher selected WIOD as the call sign, signifying the "Wonderful Isle of Dreams" to commemorate Collins Island, where studios and offices were located. WIOD is Florida's seventh-oldest continuously licensed broadcast radio station.

=== Consolidation with WMBF ===
On February 7, 1925, an earlier station, WMBF, had been licensed to the Fleetwood Hotel Corporation in Miami Beach, with studios on the 16th floor. However, in early 1929 WMBF was consolidated with WIOD, with the combination assigned the dual call sign of WIOD-WMBF. The consolidated station was briefly assigned to WMBF's old frequency of 560 kHz, before moving to 1300 kHz later the same year.

In 1937, the station moved to 610 kHz. In 1940, the WMBF call letters were dropped from the dual call sign, and the station became just WIOD. It was an NBC Red Network affiliate through the 1930s, '40s and '50s, airing NBC's schedule of dramas, comedies, news and sports during the "Golden Age of Radio". The studios were at 600 Biscayne Boulevard in Miami. In the 1950s, as network programming was moving from radio to television, WIOD switched to a full service format of middle of the road music (MOR), news and sports.

=== Call letter change to WCKR ===
In 1956, a new Miami television station, channel 7 WCKT (now WSVN), began operation. Its owner was Biscayne Television, which was a joint arrangement with Miami's two daily newspapers, the Cox-owned Miami News and the Knight-owned Miami Herald.

In 1956, Biscayne Television acquired 610 AM, and changed the call sign to WCKR, taking the first letters of Cox, Knight and Radio for its call letters. Branded Wacker Radio, it broadcast adult pop music by day, but offered Top 40 hits at night. The station featured noted South Florida disc jockey Rick Shaw. It also carried NBC Radio's "Monitor" program on weekends.

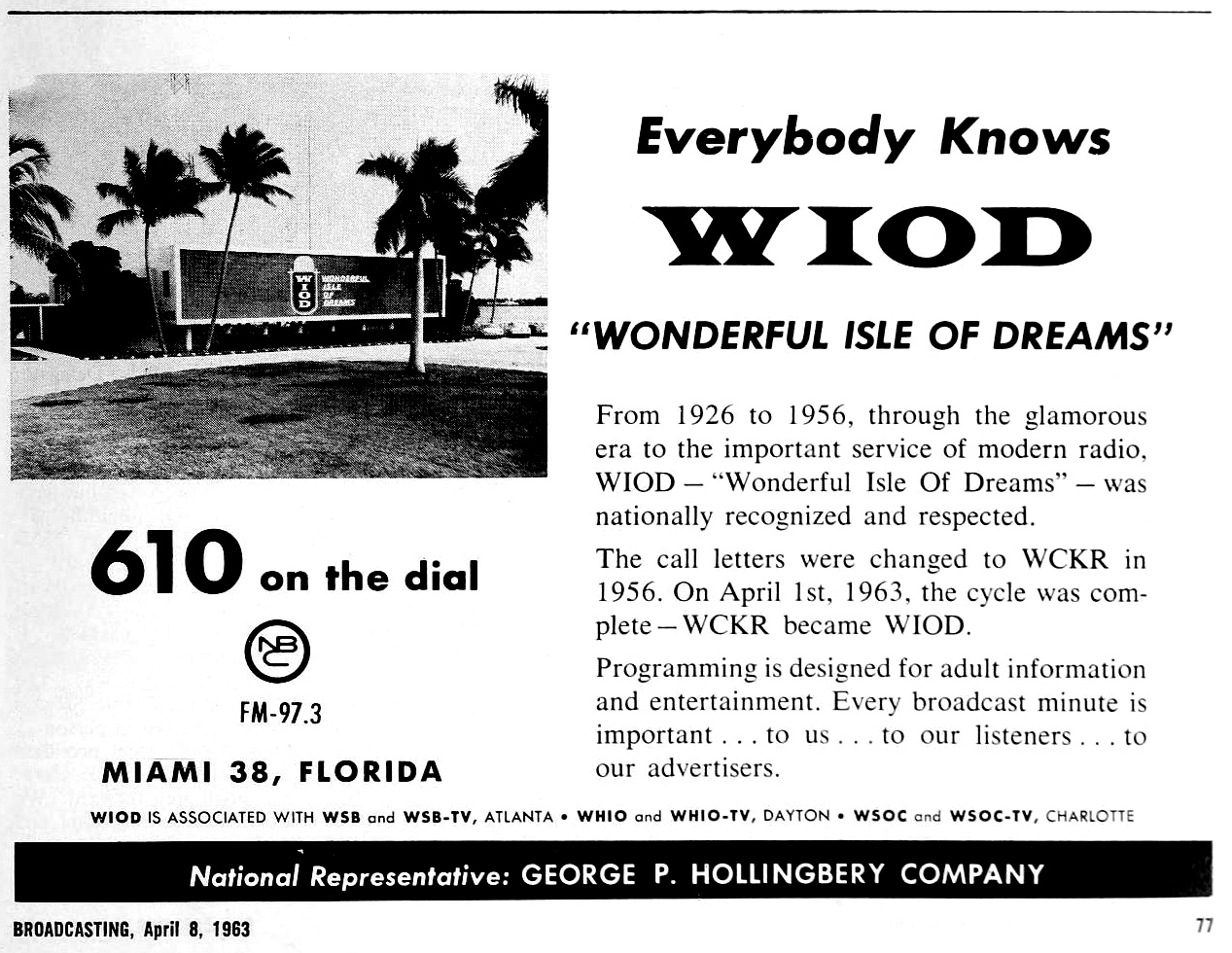
On April 1, 1963, the station returned to the original WIOD call sign.

On April 1, 1963, the station returned to its original call sign of WIOD.

=== Cuban interference ===
On June 16, 1981, WIOD began operating with 10,000 watts day and night, after having been powered at 5,000 watts, the normal maximum for U.S. stations on "regional" frequencies, for most of its post-war history. This was to counter interference being caused by a high-powered Cuban station. This was permitted by a special temporary authority (STA) granted by the FCC, that was regularly renewed.

On April 6, 2017, WIOD filed an application for an FCC construction permit to move to a new transmitter site, increase day power to 50,000 watts and increase night power to 20,000 watts. It was accepted for filing the following day.

== Honors and sports ==
WIOD has been a frequent winner in annual Florida Associated Press statewide competitions. WIOD may be best known for its continuous storm coverage, particularly during Hurricane Andrew, Hurricane Katrina and Hurricane Wilma.

WIOD was the radio flagship station of the 2006 NBA champions Miami Heat basketball team from 1996 until 2008. From 1966 until 2001 it was the radio flagship of the Miami Dolphins football team, the longest partnership between a Miami sports team and a radio flagship station. It also was the Florida Panthers' original flagship station from 1993 until 2003. Currently WIOD is the official broadcast emergency station for the Broward County Commission.

From April 2010 to March 2014 WIOD had been simulcast on FM translator W262AN at 100.3 MHz. That frequency is now used by a low-power FM station, WQNB. WIOD is also heard on the HD3 subchannel of sister station WBGG-FM 105.9.

== Former personalities and jingles ==
WIOD's former hosts include Larry King, Neil Rogers, Sally Jessy Raphael, Ron Bennington, Mike Reineri, Bill Calder, Alan Burke, Sandy Peyton, Rick and Suds, Hank Goldberg, Ed Berliner, Randi Rhodes, Big Wilson, Chris Baker, Phil Hendrie, Joey Reynolds, Tom Gauger, Dave LaMont, Tom Leykis, Jack Ellery and Ed Arnold. Former full-time anchors include Mike Woulfe, Lori Shepard, Lauren Pastrana, Patty DeMendoza, Wendi Grossman, Andrew Julian, Ron Hersey, Aron Bender, Randy Lantz, Christina Kautz and John Levitt. Mike Reineri hosted the last music show on WIOD on weekday mornings from 1974 to 1989. At that point, the station switched to a full time talk format. He was still with WIOD till 1992. Reineri's traffic reporter, Dave Mitchell, hosted the show on Saturday and Sunday mornings in the same time slot. Longtime anchor and News Director Lori Shepard left WIOD in August 2013. Other traffic reporters on WIOD in the 1980s and 1990s and 2003-2007 were Miami radio veterans: Richard Lewis, Joe Brennan, George Sheldon, Teri Griffin and Don Anthony (Dave Agony from the WAXY FM days). Joe Brennan left I-Heart's WIOD in 2018, Don Anthony (aka Don Agony) retired from radio broadcasting in 2009, George Sheldon retired from radio/television broadcasting January 31, 2013, in Asheville, NC, Teri Griffin (retired from broadcasting and has moved out of South Florida), and Trish Anderson (deceased). Since 1989 WIOD has had a news-talk format.

Jingles best remembered at WIOD have included "WIOD/Someplace Special", "The sunshine machine is coming your way/WIOD", "Mike Reineri/will get you started and on your way/every morning on WIOD", "Your Hometown Station/WIOD", "Go Dolphins! on WIOD" and "The Miami Heat on WIOD/The Game's On Us/WIOD". WIOD primarily used TM Productions jingles during the 1970s, mostly resung from KDKA packages. The station did not have an image song until it had JAM Creative Productions' "First of All" jingle package resung and customized for them in the mid-1980s. Other JAM jingle series that were reworked to accommodate the six-note WIOD logo include "The Spirit of New England", "New Day", "Superstation" and "New York Fan". WFAN New York's jingle melody is actually modeled after WIOD's jingle melody and, when WIOD had "New York Fan" resung for them, the station ordered a custom package, "Extra Innings", to accompany the "New York Fan" jingles. All JAM Creative Productions jingle series used by WIOD remain available from the company.
