= WHYI-FM =

Radio station in Fort Lauderdale, Florida

Coordinates: 25.968°N 80.209°W

- Fort Lauderdale, Florida; United States
- Broadcast area: Miami–Fort Lauderdale–; West Palm Beach, Florida
- Frequency: 100.7 MHz (HD Radio)
- Branding: Y100.7

Programming
- Language: English
- Format: Contemporary hit radio
- Affiliations: iHeartRadio; Premiere Networks

Ownership
- Owner: iHeartMedia; (iHM Licenses, LLC)
- Sister stations: WBGG-FM; WINZ; WIOD; WMIA-FM; WMIB; WXBN; WZTU

History
- First air date: 1960
- Former call signs: WMFP (1960–1962); WMJR (1962–1973); WLQY (1973–1974)
- Call sign meaning: Refers to station branding: "WHY" (as in Y) I = 1 (Roman numeral, as in 100)

Technical information
- Licensing authority: FCC
- Facility ID: 41381
- Class: C0
- ERP: 100,000 watts
- HAAT: 307 meters (1,007 ft)

Links
- Public license information: Public file; LMS
- Webcast: Listen live (via iHeartRadio)
- Website: y100.iheart.com

WHYI-FM (100.7 MHz) is a heritage contemporary hit radio station. The station is licensed to Fort Lauderdale, Florida, and owned by iHeartMedia. Y100.7 broadcasts at an effective radiated power of 100,000 watts from its 1,007 foot transmitter, which is located on the Miami-Dade side of the Miami-Dade-Broward County line near U.S. 441 and County Line Road. Its studios are located in Pembroke Pines.

Y100.7 is the longest-running Top 40 station in both the United States and North America with the same call letters and nickname.

== History ==
=== WMFP/WMJR ===
The 100.7 FM frequency was signed on in early 1960 as a religious station with the call letters WMFP. It was owned by Percy Crawford from 1960 to 1962.

From 1962 to 1973, it was known as a beautiful music station with the call letters of WMJR. In late 1966, the station's studios (located in the Kenann building, a round building on the corner of US1 and Oakland Park Blvd. in Fort Lauderdale), tower, and signal coverage were greatly upgraded from 56,000 watts to 100,000 watts by engineer and entrepreneur Ron Crider, who sold the station in 1973, to former Hawaii congressman Cecil Heftel for $1,500,000, a record price for a radio station at the time.

=== Y100 ===
Y100 has been broadcasting continuously with various forms of contemporary hit music since it signed on August 3, 1973, at 6 am, with new call letters WLQY (the station was originally to be known as "Lucky 100". The station was renamed Y100 during a staff meeting with consultant Buzz Bennett at the suggestion of the first airstaff).

The first song played on Y100 was "Diamond Girl" by Seals and Crofts. The original line-up included Roby Yonge and John Emm in the mornings, Larry McKay in middays, future Power 96 jock Don "Cox On The Radio" Cox in afternoons, with Davey O'Donnell in nights, and Eric Rhoads on the overnights. Weekends included Bill Christie and Kevin Malloy. Bill Tanner was later hired as the midday personality and assistant program director, and later promoted to the program director and moved to the morning show as "Tanner-in-the-Morning".

Several months after signing on, the call letters were changed from WLQY to WHYI following complaints from a crosstown competitor at WMYQ. They felt the call letters were too similar and would create confusion.

Y100 ushered in the era of the big money contests and aggressive promotional strategy that made the station one of the fastest-growing FM stations in the country during the 1970s. In 1975, Y100 was the first station in South Florida to broadcast live during the world-famous street party known as Calle Ocho.

As program director and DJ, Bill Tanner hired on-air personalities including sports reporter John “Footy” Kross, newsman Jim Reihle, traffic reporter and the first "Captain Y" Glen Logan, the second "Captain Y" Mark Lipof, midday host Cramer Haas, Joanne "Jo The Rock 'N' Roll Madame" Meader, Jay Marks, Rick Eliott, Robert W. Walker, Don "Cox On The Radio" Cox, Tom Birch, Dave Dunaway, Banana Joe, Quincy McCoy, Gnarlie Charlie, Jade Alexander, Earl "The Pearl" Lewis, and overnight host Mark "Mark In The Dark" Shands.

Mark Shands served as music director during part of his time at Y100 and was a substitute newsman on Tanner's show. John Hartman was a music director during the early 1970s. Colleen "The Vinyl Queen" Cassidy became Y100's first female music and research director in 1978, starting Y100's first call-out research department. The station mascot from 1973 to 2009 was the Y100 Dolphin, which marketing reports showed was one of the most recognized logos in South Florida.

In 1976, Heftel sold Y100 to Metroplex Communications (Norm and Bob). In 1994, that company sold its group of stations to Clear Channel Communications (now iHeartMedia).

In January 2004, WHYI-FM rebranded as Y100.7 to avoid confusion with Philadelphia station WPLY, which used the domain Y100.com. However, in 2005, WPLY closed operations and went off-air. In mid-2006, WHYI-FM reverted to the original Y100 brand. By 2007, the Y100.com domain formerly used by WPLY was acquired by WHYI-FM. In December 2024, WHYI-FM reverted to Y100.7 and began adding more current Spanish language songs into the station's playlist.

=== Morning show history ===
==== Sonny Fox & Ron Hersey ====
In 1982, Bill Tanner and Jim Reihle left Y100. For morning shows, Sonny Fox and Ron Hersey replaced them. Using a blend of parody songs, phony commercials, and impersonations of local and national celebrities and politicians. Fox, Hersey, Mark "Captain Y" Lipof, John "Footy" Kross, and Mr. Mike Raffone led the morning show to its highest ratings ever.

In 1987, Hersey left Y100. In 1988, Fox left Y100.

==== Bobby & Footy ====
John Kross was a presence on the locally produced morning show for a record 32 years running from 1974 to 2006, thus holding the record for the longest Top 40/CHR disc jockey in North America (even if he was actually a radio sports reporter for most of the time). Footy also hosted the "Y100 Wing Ding", a charity event to help fight drug abuse.

Mark "Captain Y" Lipof left the show in 1993 after 17 years on-air, having produced the show and handled the duties of On-Air News Director and Traffic Reporter. He owns Lipof Advertising in Plantation, Florida.

Famous morning show character "Mike Van Driver", also known as Michael Woods, traveled all over the market, adding to the fun of the show.

Morning Show Producer/On-air Personality "Video Steve" Czarnecki departed in 1998, six years after he started with the Morning Show later to pursue a career as a local television producer. Bobby also left Footy and South Florida in 1998 to head back home to Texas.

==== Footy & The Chix @ Six ====
In 1998, the morning show was renamed "Footy & The Chix @ Six", and Footy co-hosted the show with several female personalities, including Jade Alexander, Tina Malave, and Elaine Turner. The show featured Rod Hagwood, Lightning Steve, Roland Norio, and Joe Cruise.

==== Kenny & Footy ====
On Monday, June 18, 2001, Footy paired up with afternoon DJ Kenny Walker to co-host "The Y100 Early Morning Show". A few months later, in January 2002, the show was renamed "Kenny & Footy in the Morning". In May 2002, Froggy left The MJ Morning Show to join the show.

In January 2006, Kenny Walker was released from Y100 at the expiration of his contract, which was not renewed.

In the spring of 2006, Footy and Froggy co-hosted the show with two afternoon and evening DJs - first Adam Bomb and then Michael Yo.

In May 2006, Footy left Y100.

==== Current morning show ====
Currently, Y100.7 is the Miami affiliate for Elvis Duran and the Morning Show.

== Evolution 93.5 Miami ==
On Tuesday, March 12, 2013, Evolution 93.5 Miami was launched on 93.5 FM, broadcasting Electronic dance music 24/7 from iHeartRadio's Evolution network, and started broadcasting on WHYI's HD2 subchannel as of late 2013. On May 11, 2015, the HD2 programming was taken over by Zoo Communications and rebranded as "Revolution Radio" with local programming in October 2015.
