= WFEZ =

Soft adult contemporary radio station in Miami

- Miami, Florida; United States
- Broadcast area: South Florida metropolitan area
- Frequency: 93.1 MHz (HD Radio)
- Branding: Easy 93.1

Programming
- Language: English
- Format: Adult contemporary
- Subchannels: HD2: Dance
- Affiliations: Premiere Networks

Ownership
- Owner: Cox Media Group; (Cox Radio, LLC)
- Sister stations: WEDR; WFLC; WHQT

History
- First air date: December 29, 1947
- Former call signs: WKAT-FM (1947–1971); WTMI (1971–2001); WPYM (2002–2005); WHDR (2005–2010)
- Call sign meaning: "Florida's Easy"

Technical information
- Licensing authority: FCC
- Facility ID: 40408
- Class: C0
- ERP: 98,000 watts
- HAAT: 307 meters (1,007 ft)
- Transmitter coordinates: 25°58′2.00″N 80°12′34.00″W

Links
- Public license information: Public file; LMS
- Webcast: Listen live; Listen live (via Audacy); Listen live (via iHeartRadio)
- Website: www.easy931miami.com

WFEZ (93.1 MHz, "Easy 93.1") is a commercial radio station licensed to Miami, Florida. Owned by Cox Media Group, it broadcasts an adult contemporary format serving Miami-Dade, Broward, and most of Palm Beach counties. WFEZ’s studios are located on North 29th Avenue in Hollywood, and its transmitter site is just south of the Miami-Dade/Broward County Line near Northwest 215th Street and State Road 7 in Miami Gardens.

== History ==
=== Early years, classical era as WTMI, and Dance era as WPYM (1971–2005) ===
93.1 FM was originally WKAT-FM, which began broadcasting on a full-time basis on December 29, 1947, at 4 p.m.. Later, the station became classical-formatted WTMI, which began in March 1971. For decades, the station also featured popular jazz broadcaster China Valles and his overnight show, "China's Jazz Thing", Monday through Friday. At noon on New Year's Eve, 2001, WTMI flipped to a dance format and became WPYM, "Party 93.1, South Florida's Pure Dance Channel". The first song on "Party 93.1" was "Shut the F up and Dance" by Adrenaline. The station earned an "Innovators Award" from Billboard magazine in 2002, and a "Best Dance Radio Station Award", at the 2004 Dancestar USA honors.

=== WHDR "93 Rock" (2005–2010) ===
WPYM's demise came on February 14, 2005, at 6 p.m.. With decent ratings but poor marketing sales from non-local companies, Cox Radio took advantage of the sudden departure of WZTA (when it flipped from rock to Hispanic rhythmic as WMGE) by picking up the active rock format and taking the call letters WHDR, and rebranding as "93 Rock". It became a mainstream rock station per Mediabase and Nielsen BDS reports in 2008. For a few years, the station aired Bubba the Love Sponge in mornings, which was syndicated from sister station WHPT in Tampa.

=== WFEZ "Easy 93.1" (2010–present) ===
On November 20, 2010, at 7 a.m., due to underwhelming ratings with their mainstream rock format, WHDR began stunting with Christmas music, with a new format to debut after the holidays. At midnight on December 26, the station flipped to soft AC as "Easy 93.1". The first song on "Easy" was, coincidentally, "Easy" by The Commodores. The following day, WHDR changed call letters to WFEZ to match the new format.

Unlike WPYM and WHDR, the station has become a runaway success. Since 2010, Director of Programming Gary Williams has slowly evolved the station to a slightly more contemporary direction, bringing WFEZ to the top of the ratings in the Miami-Ft. Lauderdale market. In addition, Williams paired Hispanic radio market veteran Giselle Andres with AC market veteran Jeff Martin for the morning drive. The pairing has proved to be quite successful, as WFEZ's morning show is often ranked in the top 5 with adults 25–54 and 18–34. In 2013, WFEZ had the distinct pleasure of being nominated as a Marconi finalist for "AC Station of the Year". With the success of WFEZ, several other radio groups over the past few years have launched their version of the format under the "Easy" or "Breeze" monikers.

In June 2020, new owners Cox/Apollo began consolidating positions within the company. After nearly twenty years with the Miami cluster, Gary Williams exited after his position was eliminated; WHQT programmer Phil Michaels-Trueba assumed programming duties for WFEZ, until September 2021, when another round of budget cuts eliminated the position of sister station WEDR's Program Director, Jill Strada. As a result, Trueba will now oversee WEDR, along with WHQT. Sister station WFLC's Program Director, Ian Richards, assumed programming responsibilities for WFEZ. Since Williams' departure, the format of WFEZ began to change drastically, shifting to a more uptempo and contemporary direction. On April 5, 2023, after seven years as morning host, Giselle Andres resigned from her top-rated show, citing on social media, that she's "ready for her next adventure"; however insiders close to the source indicated internal management issues that contributed to her decision to depart. On July 7, 2023, Andres' longtime co-host, Jeff Martin, departed the station citing a new direction for the morning show. On July 10, 2023, it was announced that mid-day host Korby Ray will co-host mornings on WFEZ with Bobby Mitchell (Kent Laturno), who co-hosted mornings on WHYI in the early 1990s. In October 2024, WFEZ parted ways with Korby Ray.

== WFEZ-HD2: Party 93.1 HD2 ==
On March 24, 2008, Cox relaunched "Party 93.1" on the station's HD2 sub-channel. Like its predecessor, this version of "Party" is also running jockless, but the station's playlist has been broadened significantly, with more music from the trance music and house music genres. In March 2011, the station, which had only been available on HD Radio within the station's local listening area, began streaming on the internet again for the first time since 2005. However, in June 2013, the website ceased to exist.
