= WMIA-FM =

Radio station in Miami Beach, Florida

Coordinates: 25.968°N 80.209°W

Miami Beach, Florida; United States
- Broadcast area: South Florida
- Frequency: 93.9 MHz (HD Radio)
- Branding: Magic 93.9

Programming
- Language: Spanish
- Format: Latin pop and adult contemporary music
- Subchannels: HD2: TikTok Radio; HD3: 104.7 The Bull (Country music)
- Affiliations: Motor Racing Network (HD3)

Ownership
- Owner: iHeartMedia; (iHM Licenses, LLC)
- Sister stations: WBGG-FM; WHYI-FM; WINZ; WIOD; WMIB; WXBN; WZTU

History
- First air date: December 1, 1948; 77 years ago
- Former call signs: WLRD (1948–1956); WAHR-FM (1956–1958); WMET-FM (1958–1962); WMBM-FM (1962); WMVJ (1962–1963); WMBM-FM (1963–1966); WGOS (1966–1968); WBUS (1968–1976); WWWL (1976–1983); WWWL-FM (1983–1984); WLVE (1984–2009)
- Call sign meaning: Miami (IATA airport code for Miami International Airport)

Technical information
- Licensing authority: FCC
- Facility ID: 51978
- Class: C0
- ERP: 98,000 watts; 100,000 watts with beam tilt
- HAAT: 307 meters (1,007 ft)
- Translator: HD3: 104.7 W284CS (Miami)

Links
- Public license information: Public file; LMS
- Webcast: Listen live (via iHeartRadio); HD3: Listen live (via iHeartRadio)
- Website: magic939miami.iheart.com; HD3: thebull1047.iheart.com

WMIA-FM (93.9 MHz) is a radio station licensed to Miami Beach, Florida. Owned and operated by iHeartMedia, it broadcasts a Spanish-language format featuring a mixture of Latin pop and English-language adult contemporary hits.

Its studios are located in Pembroke Pines, and its transmitter site is in Miami Gardens.

== History ==
=== Early years ===
93.9 FM signed on the air December 1, 1948, as WLRD, the first standalone FM station in Miami. It was built by Alan Henry, Leo and Yvette Rosenson, doing business as the Mercantile Broadcasting Company; studios were in the Mercantile National Bank building at 420 Lincoln Road. The original 200-foot (61 m) mast at 812 First Street was damaged in Hurricane King in 1950. Early programming was background music.

The station became WAHR-FM in 1956 after the establishment of WAHR (1490 AM) two years prior. From this point, the FM primarily simulcast the AM. Both stations were sold to Community Service Broadcasting of Cincinnati in 1958, with the call letters changed to WMET-AM-FM, Four years later, WMBM-FM struck out on its own with a jazz format and changed its call sign to WMVJ ("Miami's Voice of Jazz"). The change was reverted the next year, but it split off again as WGOS in 1966. Initially airing a gospel format, this changed to country "Wild Goose Country". In 1968, WGOS became WBUS; by 1970, it had turned the letters into business, airing a business news format. Three years later, WBUS flipped to progressive rock as "The Magic Bus". A jazz format returned in 1974, and the station hired Symphony Sid out of retirement for its air staff.

=== Love 94 ===
On October 29, 1976, after losing money with the jazz format, the station became WWWL "Love 94", changing to a "soft rock" adult contemporary format. DJ Irene Richard (later Irene Richard Brandon) joined the station in 1976, becoming one of South Florida's earliest, pioneer female broadcasters. The WLVE call letters were adopted in 1984 after being surrendered by a station in Madison, Wisconsin. Later, the soft rock transitioned to smooth jazz and was successful for many years. On Sunday mornings, Love 94 had a Sunday Jazz Brunch program hosted by Stu Grant and a Brazilian Jazz program called "Brazilian Love Jazz" hosted by Gina Martell every Sunday evening. It also had a satellite station, WWLV 94.3 in West Palm Beach from 1998 to 2003. In the later years, however, due to the increasing amount of R&B and Adult Contemporary music being added to the playlist by Broadcast Architecture (which WLVE adopted in 2007), the ratings started to decrease drastically.

=== After Love: WMIA-FM ===
On December 25, 2008, WLVE flipped to rhythmic AC as "93.9 MIA." The demise followed the lead of similarly formatted stations in other cities, such as Dallas, Houston, New York City and Washington, D.C. The first song was Will Smith's "Miami", which is a reflection upon where the city it broadcasts from.

In 2010, WMIA-FM began adding more pop titles from artists such as Maroon 5, Michael Bublé, Kelly Clarkson, and Taylor Swift to its playlist, following a pattern used by sister stations such as WWVA-FM and WISX which eventually evolved out of, or switched from rhythmic AC, as the station became more hot adult contemporary. In November 2010, the station switched to all-Christmas music. While there were rumors that the station would flip to adult top 40 after the holidays, the rhythmic AC format returned on Christmas Day 2010, at 11:58 am, with "Material Girl" by Madonna being the first song to be played. By that time, although WMIA-FM had continued to be listed on Mediabase's hot AC panel, its playlist had shifted back to a rhythmic direction with less hot AC material. By June 2012, BDS has moved the station to the Top 40 panel due to its increasing amount of rhythmic pop product, although this was done to complement sister station WHYI-FM, who is the market's primary Top 40/CHR outlet, and to a lesser extent, to shift the older 1980s, 1990s and 2000s product to adult hits sister WSHE.

Once again, in December 2012, WMIA-FM revamped their direction to adult top 40 with recurrents from the 1990s and 2000s, billing themselves as "90s and Now". The majority of rhythmic material that had not charted on that format was dropped, only to reinstate it by the spring of 2013, when it dropped most of the 1990s music and changed its slogan to "Today's Hits". It also adopted an adult top 40 presentation, using the same approach as sister station WKTU in the New York City market, and in early 2014, changed slogans to "Miami's Variety from the '90s to Now". In May 2014, WMIA-FM changed their slogan to "93.9 MIA Means Variety" and added 1980s hit songs to their playlist.

On August 8, 2014, WMIA-FM rebranded as "MY 93.9" with their slogan becoming "More Music, Better Variety". This change came after WMIA-FM was the lowest rated music station in the Nielsen ratings for the Miami market, with a 2.3 share in the July 2014 ratings. "MY 93.9" dropped most of the 1980s material from their playlist and focused on hits from the 1990s and 2000s.

Logo under the 2016–2020 incarnation of "93.9 MIA"

On March 18, 2016, WMIA-FM rebranded once again as "93.9 MIA", shifting back to rhythmic AC with the new slogan "Rhythm from the 80s to Now." In March 2018, the station shifted to hot adult contemporary. This put WMIA-FM in a crowded field for adult music competing between WFEZ, WLYF, WFLC and WRMF.

On July 9, 2020, at Noon, WMIA-FM flipped to 1990s hits, branded as "Totally 93.9".

On February 9, 2022, at 6 am, WMIA-FM flipped back to hot adult contemporary, also reviving the "93.9 MIA" branding. "MIA" failed once again in its third go-around, finishing 20th in the market in their last books, the October 2023 Nielsen Audio market ratings, with a mere 2.1 share.

On November 24, 2023, at Noon, WMIA-FM rebranded as "Magic 93.9"; the station features a gold-based mix of Latin pop and English-language adult contemporary hits from the 1980s and 1990s (with its first song being "Conga" by Miami Sound Machine, and its playlist and promoted core artists including performers such as the Backstreet Boys, Celine Dion, Luis Miguel, Madonna. Marc Anthony, Michael Jackson, Selena, and Shakira), with on-air presentation and programming conducted in Spanish.

iHeartMedia's chief programming officer Tom Poleman stated that the format was designed to appeal to bilingual listeners "that love the big Anglo hits but want to be spoken to in Spanish", emphasizing "the importance of companionship in radio, how the elements between the songs are our unique proposition", and that a "Spanglish" presentation would not have had the same cultural impact. The station launched with a full airstaff, with the most notable member being Humberto "El Gato" Rodríguez, formerly of WZTA and WRMA, in mornings. "Magic" proved more successful, with its December 2023 ratings increasing from 15th place to 6th among adults 25-54; Poleman credited word-of-mouth as having been a factor alongside the company's own marketing. By September 2024, the station had achieved its highest ratings share since the first run of the "MIA" format in 2009.

== WMIA-FM HD2 ==
WMIA-FM signed on HD Radio operations in 2006. The HD1 sub-channel airs the same format as the analog, while the HD2 sub-channel initially aired a traditional jazz format. When the analog/HD1 format flipped to Rhythmic AC in 2008, the smooth jazz format moved to the HD2 channel. On July 11, 2014, WMIA-FM HD2 flipped to country music, branded as "93.5 The Bull", which was relayed on FM translator W228BV 93.5 in Fort Lauderdale. On July 1, 2016, Zoo Communications acquired W228BV, and on November 17 of that year, W228BV and Zoo's W284CS (104.7 FM) swapped formats and ownership, with the Country music format moving to 104.7 (with iHeart now owning that translator), while the Dance/EDM format of W228BY began simulcasting on W228BV. In addition, "104.7 the Bull" airs several NASCAR events from the Motor Racing Network.
