= WZTU =

Spanish-language contemporary hit radio station in Miami

Coordinates: 25.968°N 80.209°W

- Miami Beach, Florida; United States
- Broadcast area: Miami–Hollywood–Fort Lauderdale, Florida
- Frequency: 94.9 MHz (HD Radio)
- Branding: Tú 94.9

Programming
- Language: Spanish
- Format: Contemporary hit radio
- Subchannels: HD2: La Mezcla 94.9 (Spanish Sports radio); HD3: Radio By Grace (Christian radio)
- Affiliations: Premiere Networks; Miami Dolphins (Spanish)

Ownership
- Owner: iHeartMedia; (iHM Licenses, LLC)
- Sister stations: WBGG-FM; WHYI-FM; WINZ; WIOD; WMIA-FM; WMIB; WXBN

History
- First air date: 1962
- Former call signs: WAEZ (1962–1969); WOCN-FM (1969–1975); WINZ-FM (1975–1987); WZTA (1987–2005); WMGE (2005–2016)
- Call sign meaning: "Tú" (Spanish for "you")

Technical information
- Licensing authority: FCC
- Facility ID: 51979
- Class: C0
- ERP: 100,000 watts
- HAAT: 307 meters (1,007 ft)
- Translator: HD3: 94.5 W233AP (Oakland Park)

Links
- Public license information: Public file; LMS
- Webcast: Listen live (via iHeartRadio); HD2: Listen live (via iHeartRadio); HD3: www.radiobygrace.com/player/
- Website: tu949fm.iheart.com; HD2: lamezcla949.iheart.com; HD3: www.radiobygrace.com

WZTU (94.9 FM, "Tú 94.9") is a commercial American radio station in the Miami-Ft. Lauderdale radio market. Owned and operated by iHeartMedia, its studios are located in Pembroke Pines and the transmitter site is in Miami Gardens. The station plays a Spanish contemporary hit radio format, mixed with some English Top 40 songs.

WZTU is licensed by the FCC to broadcast in the HD Radio (hybrid) format.

== History ==
=== WQAM-FM ===
WQAM-FM signed on the air in 1947, owned by the Miami Herald. It was a full-time simulcast with WQAM. In 1957, when Storz Broadcasting purchased WQAM, the FM signal was taken off the air, and the license returned to the Federal Communications Commission (FCC), as Storz was not interested in FM at that time.

=== WAEZ ===
A new station went on the air in 1962, with 81,000 watts under the WAEZ calls. It was the first station in Miami to broadcast continuously in stereo. It played easy listening music "from the beautiful Deauville Hotel in Miami Beach". The station was owned by Arthur E. Zucker, hence the "AEZ" in the station's calls.

=== WOCN-FM ===
In 1969 it changed its calls to WOCN-FM to reflect its sister station WOCN, which it was now partially simulcasting. It continued to play its format, and even began an attempt at Spanish language romance music. For a brief moment during the mid-1970s, they were known as "Stereo 94".

=== WINZ-FM ===
In 1975, it became WINZ-FM under Guy Gannett Broadcasting, and went to a progressive rock format, with the moniker "Zeta-4" until early 1981, when it flipped to CHR/Pop station "I-95", retaining the WINZ-FM calls. "I-95" was Miami's affiliate for Dan Ingram's Top 40 Satellite Survey. "I-95" provided for a highly competitive rating battle against Top 40 powerhouse WHYI during its few years of existence, becoming #1 in the Miami ARB. In early 1986, WINZ-FM transformed from Top-40 to a short-lived classic rock and adult hits hybrid as "Rockin' With Class....95-INZ".

=== WZTA ===
In early 1987, the station flipped to classic rock as "Zeta", this time with the WZTA call letters. This is where the station would begin a long term commitment as a rocker. In the early 1990s, the station was purchased by Paxson Communications and then swallowed up by Clear Channel Communications (now iHeartMedia) in the mid 1990s. Under Paxson, the station evolved to an active rock format, still retaining the WZTA calls. In the early new millennium, Zeta attempted an alternative rock format, but switched back to the active rock format in 2004. With ratings continuing to slump, and Lex and Terry underperforming, Zeta finally came to an end on February 10, 2005 after 19 years as a rock station.

=== WMGE ===
Mega 94.9 was born, with the new calls WMGE. The station was part of Clear Channel's effort to expand its Hispanic radio efforts, as they were flipping several more stations to Spanish formats the same year under the leadership of Alfredo Alonso. Coincidentally, with no more active rock stations in the market, Cox Radio flipped their CHR-dance station Party 93.1 to active rocker 93Rock, with new calls WHDR, on February 14, 2005. Like other Hispanic urban formatted stations, Mega was a hybrid of both English and Spanish language.

The new Mega 94.9 continued to lose a listening base and failed to improve beyond its old rock format after two years on the air, and the station was adjusted to a Hispanic top 40 format in 2007.

=== WZTU ===
On September 9, 2016, WMGE rebranded as "Tú 94.9". The station changed its call sign to the current WZTU on September 16, 2016.
