= Storz (disambiguation) =

Storz is a type of hose coupling.

Storz may also refer to:

== People ==
- Storz (surname), a German surname

== Places ==
- Charles Storz House, Omaha, Nebraska, US
- Gottlieb Storz House, Omaha, Nebraska, US
- Paul Storz Tenement, Bydgoszcz, Poland

== Businesses ==
- Karl Storz SE, German medical device company
- Storz Brewing Company, founded by Gottlieb Storz
- Storz & Bickel, vaporizer company
