= Gottlieb Storz House =

Historic house in Nebraska, United States

- U.S. National Register of Historic Places
- Omaha Landmark
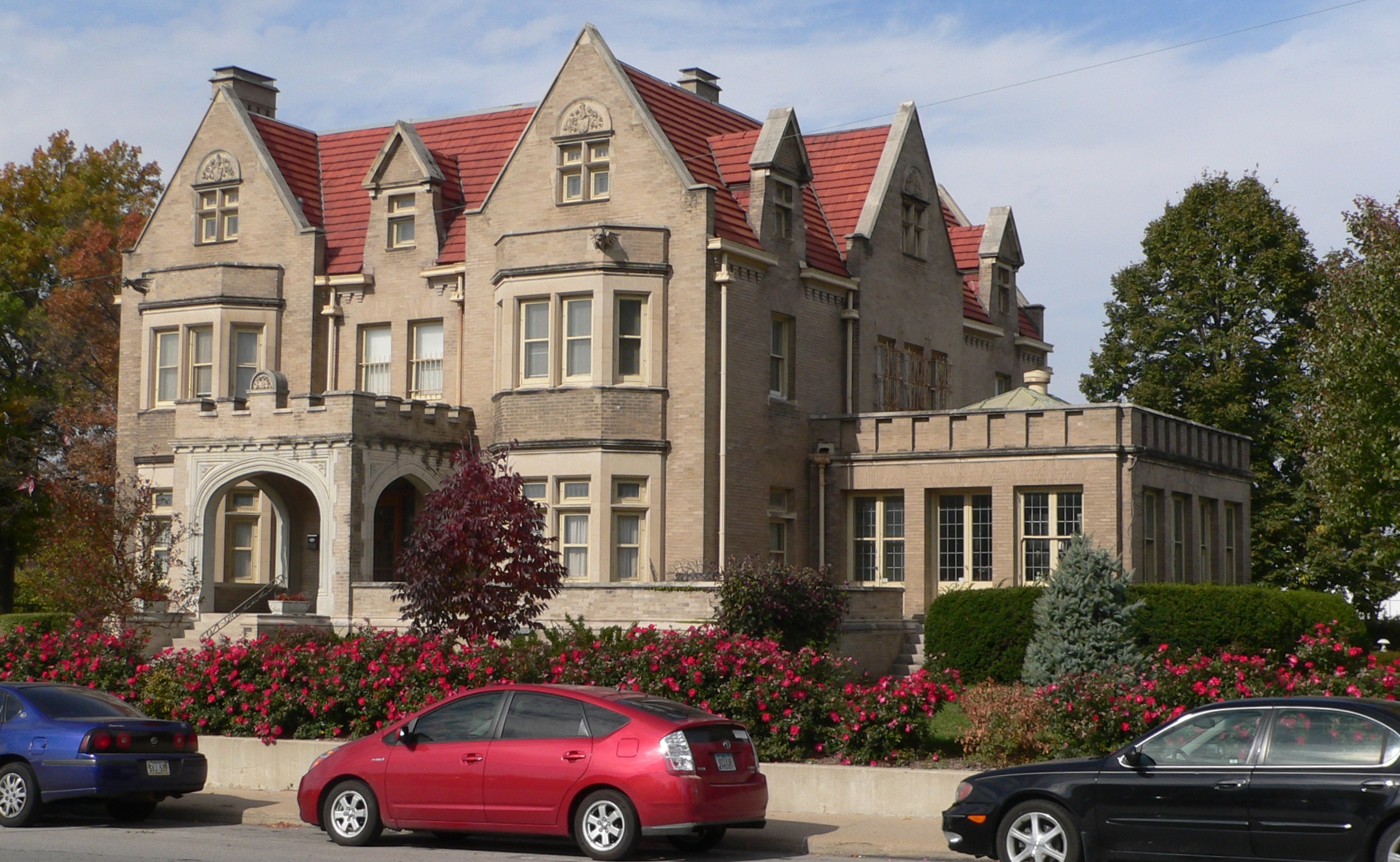
- View from the southeast, across Farnam Street

- Location within Nebraska Location within the United States
- Location: 3708 Farnam Street, Omaha, Nebraska
- Coordinates: 41°15′29.14″N 95°58′5.1″W
- Built: 1905
- Architect: Thomas R. Kimball
- Architectural style: Tudor Revival
- NRHP reference No.: 74001113

Significant dates
- Added to NRHP: August 7, 1974
- Designated OMAL: December 21, 1982

The Gottlieb Storz House is located in the Blackstone neighborhood of Midtown Omaha, Nebraska. Built in 1905 by Omaha beer magnate Gottlieb Storz, the mansion was designated an Omaha Landmark on December 21, 1982, and was listed in the National Register of Historic Places on August 7, 1974. It was included in the Gold Coast Historic District when the district was listed in the NRHP on March 14, 1997.

== About ==
Prominent German immigrant Gottlieb Storz founded the Storz Brewing Company in Omaha in 1876. After two decades of success he constructed this 27-room mansion in 1905. Built in the Jacobethan Revival style, the Storz Mansion is said to provide a rare visual connection to a "golden era" in Omaha's history. The mansion is home to the Adele and Fred Astaire Ballroom on the top floor, which is the only memorial to their Omaha roots.

Built with beige brick and limestone trim, the mansion features a red tile roof, steep gables, rectangular windows with stone mullions and transoms, and a symmetrical facade. Much of the exquisite original interior remains, including hand-carved oak woodwork, a solarium covered by a stained glass dome, and distinctive mosaic fireplaces in the living and dining rooms.

The mansion's heyday was the mid-20th century when Arthur Storz, Jr., owned it. The mansion was the scene of an opulent party celebrating the movie Strategic Air Command in 1955. The movie premiere was held in Omaha and the premiere party was held at the Storz mansion with guests including James Stewart and June Allyson, as well as the Strategic Air Command Commander Curtis LeMay. During that same period Robert Storz raised his son, Todd, in the mansion. Todd Storz grew to love ham radio while living there; he eventually pioneered the Top 40 radio format that grew to popularity around the world.

The mansion has continuously been occupied by a single family throughout its history, unlike many of the other notable houses throughout this neighborhood, which were frequently converted from single to multiple-family dwellings, and often reconverted. After it left the Storz family, Michael Gaughan, son of Jackie Gaughan, bought the house in 1989 and gave it to Creighton University in 2002. After leasing it as a residence the university sold the 27-room mansion in 2007. The new owner, Wayne Stuberg, is a professor and director of physical therapy at the University of Nebraska Medical Center's Munroe-Meyer Institute.

The grounds also include a three-story carriage house.

The Bier Stube, or gazebo that was previously sat on the west side of the property underwent extensive renovation in 2012 and was relocated to Lauritzen Gardens. The gazebo is believed to be the only remaining structure from Omaha's Trans-Mississippi and International Exposition of 1898.

== See also ==
- Architecture in North Omaha, Nebraska
- Charles Storz House - Gottlieb's son's home
