= WQAM =

Sports radio station in Miami

- Miami, Florida; United States
- Broadcast area: South Florida
- Frequency: 560 kHz
- Branding: 104.3 WQAM

Programming
- Language: English
- Format: Sports radio
- Affiliations: BetMGM Network; Westwood One Sports; Florida Panthers; Miami Hurricanes; Miami Heat

Ownership
- Owner: Audacy, Inc.; (Audacy License, LLC)
- Sister stations: WAXY; WKIS; WLYF; WMXJ; WPOW; WQAM-FM

History
- First air date: January 23, 1923
- Former frequencies: 834 kHz (1923); 1060 kHz (1923–1924); 1120 kHz (1924–1925); 1140 kHz (1925–1926); 1050 kHz (1926–1927); 980 kHz (1927); 780 kHz (1927–1928); 1240 kHz (1928–1929)
- Call sign meaning: None; assigned from a sequential list (Note: Other stations first licensed that month included WQAJ, Ann Arbor, Michigan; WQAN, Scranton, Pennsylvania; and WQAO, New York City.)

Technical information
- Licensing authority: FCC
- Facility ID: 64002
- Class: B
- Power: 4,100 watts (day); 1,000 watts (night)
- Transmitter coordinates: 25°50′23.3″N 80°11′22.2″W
- Repeater: 104.3 WQAM-FM (Miramar)

Links
- Public license information: Public file; LMS
- Webcast: Listen live (via Audacy)
- Website: www.audacy.com/wqam

WQAM (560 AM) is a commercial radio station licensed to Miami, Florida, United States, featuring a sports format in simulcast with WQAM-FM. Owned by Audacy, Inc., WQAM serves the Miami metropolitan area and much of South Florida as the flagship of the Miami Heat, the Florida Panthers, Miami Hurricanes football and basketball; is the area affiliate of Westwood One Sports and the BetMGM Network; and is the radio home for Joe Rose. Studios for WQAM and WQAM-FM are located in Miami, while WQAM's transmitter resides in Miami's Little River neighborhood. In addition to a standard analog transmission, WQAM is available online via Audacy.

== History ==
=== WFAW ===
WQAM is one of Florida's oldest radio stations. According to Federal Communications Commission (FCC) records, the station was first licensed on January 23, 1923, corresponding with the first license issued with the WQAM call letters. However, multiple alternative dates have been stated for its founding, due to the opinion that WQAM's history should actually start with an earlier Miami station, WFAW. Moreover, although government records state that WFAW was licensed to The Miami Daily Metropolis from June 16, 1922 until its deletion on June 11, 1923, Fred W. Borton later claimed that WFAW had actually been first licensed to him, although there are no records supporting the existence of WFAW prior to the initial Metropolis grant.

In addition to its possible link to WQAM, WFAW's origin date in turn has been variously reported to actually be from 1920 to 1922, including:

- "WFAW, forerunner of WQAM, began operations with a 50 w transmitter in 1920".
- "The 50-watt transmitter that Mr. Borton put together out of odds and ends in 1920 was licensed for operation the following year. Its first call letters, WFAW, were changed to WQAM a year later."
- "It was in 1920, while a co-owner of the Electrical Equipment Co., that Borton cranked up the transmitter of Florida's first radio station, WFAW, the forerunner of WQAM... The call letters were changed to WQAM in 1922..."
- "Radio station WQAM was the first broadcasting station to be established in Florida. The license, issued to it by the department of commerce, to Fred W. Borton, was dated February, 1921, with the call letters WFAW. The original call letters were discontinued in 1922, and the new letters, WQAM, now in use, were adopted."
- May 1921 is listed as the WQAM start date in the 1972 edition of the Broadcasting Yearbook. ("Start date" is listed as 1920 in the 1953 edition.)
- "Founded in 1922 as the pioneer broadcaster in Florida, and still the southernmost station in the United States, WQAM..."

=== WQAM ===
On December 9, 1922, the Miami Metropolis announced that broadcasts over its station, WFAW, were being suspended, pending a move to a new Electrical Equipment Company location, with the existing WFAW transmitter to be dismantled. On January 27, 1923, the Metropolis reported that a 100 watt transmitter to be used by the newspaper's broadcast service, that was designed and built by F. W. Borton of the Electrical Equipment Company and installed at Electrical Equipment's offices at Northwest Fourth Street, would make its debut broadcast the next evening. Two days later, the newspaper wrote: "With the completion of the enlarged radio plant of The Miami Daily Metropolis and Electrical Equipment Company, The Metropolis announces that the government has granted a new charter and also changed the station number to (WQAM). The station number until today was (WFAW)." However, WQAM was licensed to the Electrical Equipment Company, and WFAW to the Miami Daily Metropolis, and government regulators at the time considered them to be separate stations, so the two are reported individually in a March 1, 1923 government listing of active licenses. Thus, the FCC History Cards documenting WQAM's records list January 23, 1923 as its "Date First Licensed", corresponding with the first license issued with the WQAM call letters.

The president of the Electrical Equipment Company was W. W. Luce. WQAM was initially licensed for operation on the 360-meter (833 kHz) "entertainment" wavelength. The call letters were randomly assigned from a sequential roster of available call signs.

Fred W. Borton, who became president of the Miami Broadcasting Company, made many of the electrical parts himself. In 1926, the station increased its power to 500 watts. The station was the first in the United States to install a permanent remote pick-up from the U. S. Meteorological Department. Power was increased to 1,000 watts in 1928, and WQAM became a full-time affiliate of CBS. In 1947, it switched to ABC Radio. In 1948, Barton sold his interest in the station and The Miami Herald assumed entire ownership.

In the beginning, the young station was helped with programming by the newspaper, until the paper ended its participation.

=== Top 40 era ===
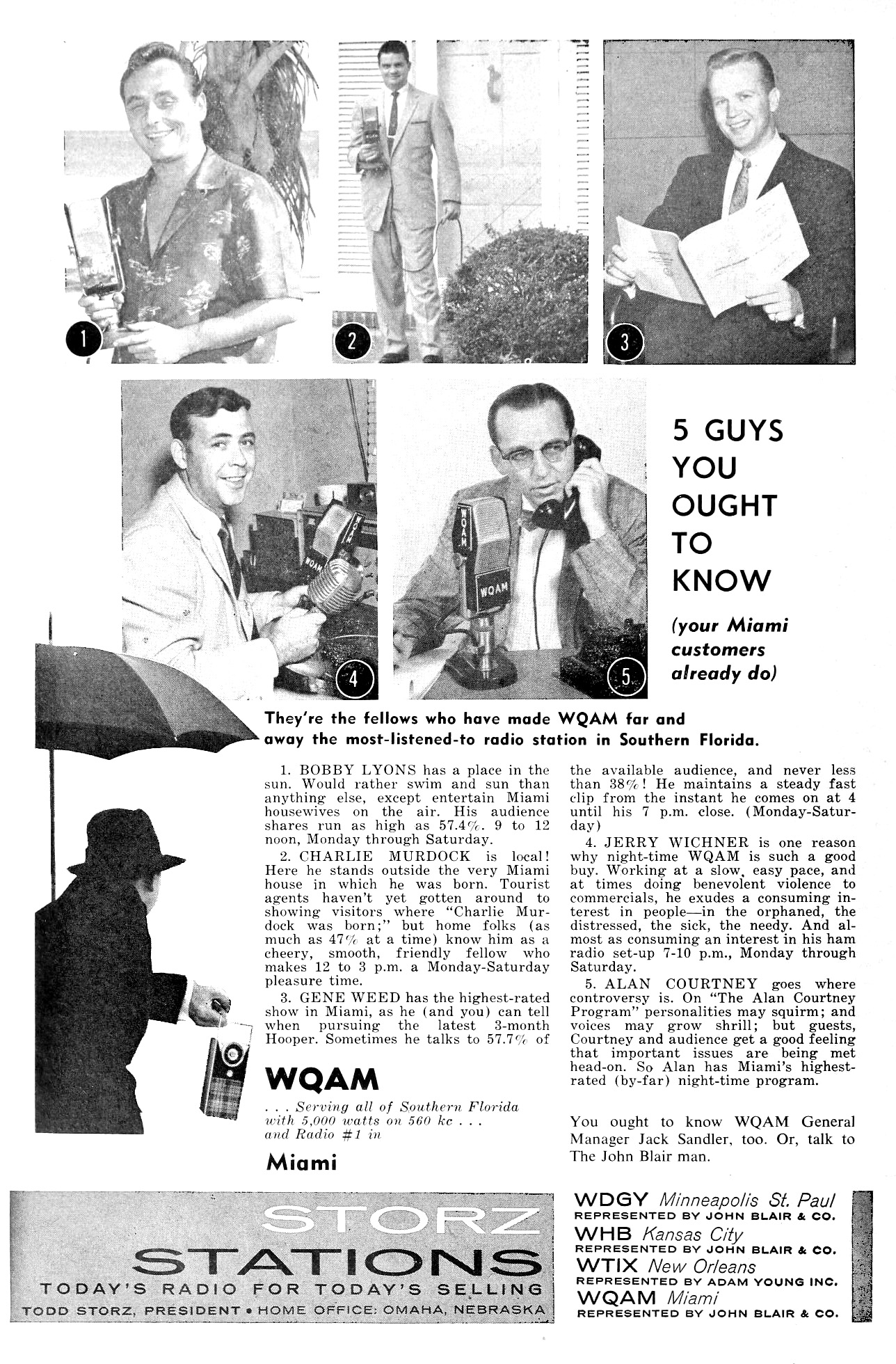
1958 promotional advertisement for Stortz radio station WQAM.

WQAM is famous for its ownership by Storz Broadcasting in the 1960s. Storz installed a Top 40 format on WQAM and the station competed vigorously with rival WFUN. In February 1964, WQAM interviewed and heavily promoted The Beatles' second and third nationally televised appearances on CBS's The Ed Sullivan Show live from the Deauville Hotel in North Beach, Miami Beach.

By far Miami and South Florida's predominant radio station at the time, baby boomers from Jupiter to Key West, and even in Havana, listened to WQAM for the latest in local and American pop music from the 1960s well into the late 1970s. At that time, WQAM was one of the many AM radio stations airing Casey Kasem's American Top 40, and Cuban youngsters used to gather at friends' houses to listen to the countdown of America's most popular songs, especially the 8-hour-long year-end show of Billboard's top 100 songs of the year in which the syndication company that owned the show had put out on vinyl records at a speed of 33 RPM.

=== Country and oldies music ===
WQAM ended its run as a Top 40 station on February 28, 1980, and Dan Halyburton signed the format with a montage of music, soundbites and jingles from PAMS. WQAM then switched to a country music format. The station was known as "Sun Country WQAM".

On September 23, 1985, Sunshine Wireless bought WQAM from Storz Broadcasting. At that time, AM radio was getting heavy competition from FM competitors and young people were increasingly tuning in FM stations for their hit music. Sunshine Wireless now had an AM country station, with personality DJs, NBC Radio News, and local information. WQAM was then known as "56 Country WQAM" in the mid-1980s, and was successful in the ratings under the direction of program director Jon Holiday. WQAM had many veteran DJ's for the country format like Mike Bell, Mitch Lewis, Johnny Dolan, and George Sheldon, who had his start in radio at WQAM in 1986. WQAM shared studios with then-WKQS at 9881 Sheridan Street in Cooper City. In 1986, WQAM would add sports talk programming in the evening hours with Ed Kaplan.

By 1989, WQAM had been unable to achieve a full share point in the Arbitron surveys with its mix of country music and sports. In 1990, the station abandoned its country music format in favor of the Satellite Music Networks' "Kool Gold" service, which aired 1950s and 1960s oldies.

=== All-sports ===
Around 1992, WQAM became an all-sports station. WQAM is the flagship station for Miami Dolphins football, Florida Panthers hockey, and University of Miami Hurricanes athletics. WQAM was sold to Beasley Broadcasting in 1996.

At first, WQAM aired programming from the Yahoo! Sports Radio network and its predecessors. On January 2, 2013, the station switched its affiliation to CBS Sports Radio for after-hours programming.

=== Audacy ownership ===
On October 2, 2014, Beasley Broadcast Group announced that it would trade five radio stations in Philadelphia and Miami (including WQAM) to CBS Radio in exchange for 14 stations located in Tampa, Charlotte and Philadelphia. The swap was completed on December 1, 2014.

On December 23, 2015, WQAM was granted a construction permit to move its transmitter tower approximately 10 miles (16 km) north from Virginia Key to the WKAT and WOCN transmitter site at 360 NE 71st Street in the Little River neighborhood of Miami. The move was coupled with a decrease in daytime power from 5,000 watts to 4,100 watts. The move allowed WQAM to use only one tower for its broadcasts instead of multiple towers on expensive South Florida real estate.

On February 2, 2017, CBS Radio announced it would merge with Entercom. The merger was approved on November 9, 2017, and was consummated on November 17, making WQAM a sister station to fellow sports station WAXY (the former WFUN).

=== ESPN and CBS Sports Radio ===
On August 2, 2019, Entercom announced that WQAM would re-launch as 560 The Joe on August 5, as part of a re-alignment of its sports talk lineups. WAXY's ESPN Radio affiliation was swapped to WQAM, clearing The Dan Le Batard Show with Stugotz (as its new flagship station), Stephen A. Smith, and the network's overnight and weekend programming (notwithstanding conflicts with sports play-by-play). In turn, some of WQAM's local hosts were moved to WAXY's lineup, while Marc Hochman and Channing Crowder's afternoon program would be simulcast by both stations (but with an opening hour exclusive to WAXY).

As part of a larger realignment of ESPN Radio's schedule on August 17, 2020 (which saw Dan Le Batard cut to two hours, and the premiere of Greeny with Mike Greenberg), WQAM began to simulcast Hochman and Crowder from WAXY in full.

On October 26, 2021, Audacy (Note: Entercom changed its name to Audacy on March 30, 2021.) realigned WQAM and WAXY's programming once again. WQAM rebranded as 560 Sports and regained its CBS Sports Radio affiliation. Some local WAXY programming was also switched to WQAM. Meanwhile, WAXY replaced much of its local programming with sports betting-oriented shows from Audacy's BetQL Network. WAXY later flipped to Spanish-language oldies and talk. WQAM began airing BetQL programming in the evening and CBS Sports Radio shows overnight and on weekends.

=== Simulcast on 104.3 FM ===
On August 7, 2025, WQAM's sister station, WSFS, dropped its alternative rock format (branded as “The Shark”) and flipped to a simulcast of WQAM. (The 104.3 facility had previously simulcast WAXY from 2012 to 2015.) With the change, WSFS adopted new call letters WQAM-FM on August 18.

The move was made to provide an FM home for WQAM's shows and affiliations. Most notably, it makes WQAM-FM the new FM broadcast flagship for the Miami Heat basketball team. Both stations began calling themselves "104.3 WQAM".

== Former sports and talk show hosts ==
- Scott Ferrall – now at SportsGrid
- Hank Goldberg – The Hammer former host
- Michael Irvin – "The Playmaker" host; now an analyst at NFL Network
- Jim Mandich – The Mad Dog former host
- Neil Rogers - former morning host
- Sid Rosenberg – now morning host on WABC New York City
- Jon Sciambi – now at ESPN.

== Sports properties ==
- Miami Dolphins (1997–2004, 2007–2009, 2016–2023; the 2016 tenure was co-held with WKIS)
- Miami Heat (1988–1993, 2022–present)
- Miami Marlins (1993–2007, 2026-present; was on 790 WAXY/104.3 WAXY-FM, then on 940 WINZ from 2013-2025)
- Florida Panthers (1993–2007, 2010–present)
- University of Miami Hurricanes (1999–present; football and men's basketball only; women's basketball and baseball are on WVUM)
- Inter Miami CF (2020-present)
