= Gottlieb Storz =

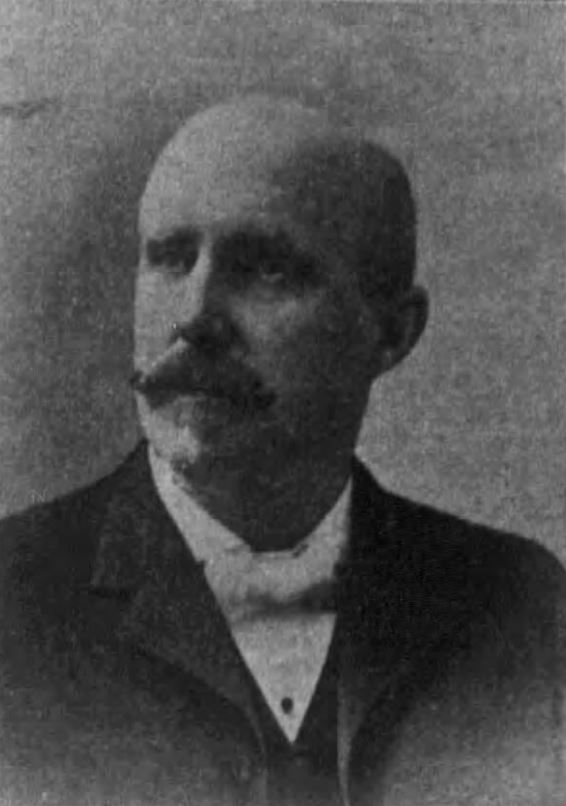
- Photograph of Storz, c. 1902
- Born: 1852; Benningen, Wurttemberg, Germany
- Died: 1939 (aged 86–87); Omaha, Nebraska
- Occupation: Businessman
- Known for: Founder of Storz Brewery

Gottlieb Storz (1852–1939) was a pioneer entrepreneur in Omaha, Nebraska. Born in Benningen, Wurttemberg, Storz was the founder of the Storz Brewery. He was an important member of Omaha's German immigrant community, and an important businessman in Omaha history. Storz was regarded as a "giant in the brewing world".

== Biography ==
After immigrating to the United States in 1870 from Germany, in 1876 Storz moved to Omaha and became the foreman of a brewery founded in 1863. Storz learned brewing in Wurttemberg and had several years experience in New York and at the William Lemp Brewing Company in St. Louis. After arriving in Omaha, Storz worked at Joseph Baumann's brewery. In 1876, Bauman died. Storz was renamed the foreman under Baumann's widow, then rented the brewery from her to run it himself.

In 1891 Storz founded the Omaha Brewing Association, with himself as president. After purchasing the company, in 1892 Storz built a state-of-the-art facility at 1819 North 16th Street in North Omaha, located at the intersection of Sherman Avenue (North 16th Street) and Clark Street.

Storz also owned many saloons, also called "tied houses", and ran one next to his plant. In response to pressure from the Prohibition Movement, in 1907 the Nebraska Legislature passed the Gibson Law which made it illegal for breweries to own saloons. In response, Storz transferred his saloons to the Independent Realty Company. While this appeared to meet the letter of the law, in 1914 the Nebraska Supreme Court revoked an Independent Realty Company saloon's liquor license, finding that the grounds were still controlled by Storz Brewery. Additionally, they also found that the company's president was Storz's wife, Minnie; the vice-president was Maggie Buck, who was also the Storz brewer and Minnie's cousin, and; the secretary/treasurer had also previously worked for the brewery.

The brewery won medals in international competitions at the Trans-Mississippi Exposition in Omaha in 1898, at the Lewis and Clark Centennial Exposition in Portland, Oregon in 1905, and in Paris in 1912.

In 1905 Gottlieb had a mansion built at 3708 Farnam Street that today is listed on the National Register of Historic Places.

Statewide prohibition went into effect in Nebraska in 1916, with the law taking effect in 1917. On January 16, 1919, Nebraska became the required 36th state to ratify the Eighteenth Amendment. Nationwide Prohibition began exactly one year later. When Nebraskans voted to repeal the state's constitutional prohibition in 1934, Storz was again in business and quickly was making up to 150,000 barrels a year.

Gottlieb Storz died in 1939. The brewery made beer until 1972.

== Family ==
Gottlieb's brother, Charles, built a fine home that today is listed on the National Register of Historic Places, as is his own home. His first son, Aldoph Gottlieb Storz, was born in 1884.

His adopted daughter Louise was noted for her short marriage in 1912 to Carl Hans Lody, who was to win notoriety as the only German spy to be publicly tried for espionage in either World War. Lody was executed in the Tower of London in November 1914 after a spectacularly short and unsuccessful career as a spy. His marriage to Louise was equally a failure; she first filed for divorce alleging assault and battery a mere 2 months after marriage. Lody left the US for 6 months soon after this but returned to a (blissful?) state of matrimony after the suit was withdrawn. However, Louise (or perhaps it was the whole family) was not to be denied and after reinstatement of the suit, decree nisi was eventually granted in March 1914.

His son Arthur Charles Storz was born in 1890, and Robert Charles Storz was born in 1898.

Robert Storz's son, Todd Storz, is credited with being the father of the Top 40 radio format and developed a chain of highly successful AM radio stations.

== See also ==
- History of Omaha
- Founding figures of Omaha, Nebraska
