= WKAT =

WKAT may refer to:

- WKAT (AM), a radio station (1450 AM) licensed to serve Miami, Florida, United States
- WQOS (AM), a radio station (1080 AM) licensed to serve Coral Gables, Florida, which held the call sign WKAT from 2018 to 2019
- WQVN, a radio station (1360 AM) licensed to serve North Miami, Florida, which held the call sign WKAT from 1937 to 2018
