= WMSF =

WMSF may refer to:

- WMSF-LP, a low-power radio station (97.1 FM) licensed to serve Mayo, Florida, United States
- WQAM-FM, a radio station (104.3 FM) licensed to serve Miramar, Florida, which held the call sign WMSF in 2012
