= WDAL =

WDAL may refer to:

- WDAL (AM) (1430 AM), a Dalton, Georgia radio station
- WINL (98.5 FM), a Linden, Alabama radio station, which held the WDAL call sign from 1986 to 1991
- WJDQ (101.3 FM), a Meridian, Mississippi radio station, which held the WDAL-FM and WDAL call signs from 1968 to 1979
- WJMX (AM) (1400 AM), a Darlington, South Carolina radio station, which held the WDAL call sign from 1953 to 1954
- WDAL (Florida) (833 AM), a former radio station which held the WDAL call sign from 1922 to 1923, and during a temporary grant in 1925
