= WMXJ =

Classic hits radio station in Pompano Beach–Miami

Pompano Beach, Florida; United States
- Broadcast area: South Florida
- Frequency: 102.7 MHz (HD Radio)
- Branding: 102.7 The Beach

Programming
- Language: English
- Format: Classic hits
- Subchannels: HD3: Caribbean music "Roadblock Radio"

Ownership
- Owner: Audacy, Inc.; (Audacy License, LLC)
- Sister stations: WAXY; WKIS; WLYF; WPOW; WQAM; WQAM-FM

History
- First air date: December 14, 1969
- Former call signs: WRBD-FM (1969–1971); WCKO (1971–1985)
- Call sign meaning: "Majic" (former moniker)

Technical information
- Licensing authority: FCC
- Facility ID: 30840
- Class: C0
- ERP: 98,000 watts
- HAAT: 307 meters (1,007 ft)
- Transmitter coordinates: 25.968°N 80.209°W

Links
- Public license information: Public file; LMS
- Webcast: Listen live (via Audacy); HD3: Listen live
- Website: www.audacy.com/thebeachmiami; HD3: www.roadblockradio.com

WMXJ (102.7 FM, "102.7 The Beach") is a commercial radio station licensed to Pompano Beach, Florida, and serving the Miami media market. The station is owned by Audacy, Inc. and airs a classic hits radio format. Its studios are located at Audacy's Miami office on Northeast Second Avenue. The transmitter is off Northwest 210th Street, also in Miami Gardens.

WMXJ broadcasts in the HD Radio format.

== History ==
=== R&B & Disco ===
On December 14, 1969, the station signed on as WRBD-FM, complementing co-owned WRBD (now WWNN), in Broward County. WRBD aired a primarily automated "soul stereo" format, with a live evening show after daytime-only WRBD left the air. In 1971, its call sign changed to WCKO-FM, ending the simulcast and airing a more FM sound but still keeping its urban contemporary format. In late 1977, WCKO changed its brand to "K-102" and switched to an automated disco format.

=== Rock ===
In 1979, K-102 changed formats again to a tight rotation of album-oriented rock hits with DJs Buddy Hollis, Bo Walker, Alan Michaels, Tom Stevens and Geoff Allen. By late 1980, K-102's audience share in South Florida had begun to rise; Zeta-4 (now WZTU) had slipped to the number three rock station in the market and was about to switch to a top 40/CHR format since WMJX was losing its FCC license. At this time, K-102 was calling itself "South Florida's Hottest Rock". In early 1982, K-102 began playing a new wave format. In 1983, K-102 moved to a more mainstream rock format programmed by broadcaster Neil Mirsky. This lasted until the station was sold.

=== Oldies ===
In early 1985, the station was purchased by Sconnix Broadcasting, and on March 7 of that year, WCKO changed call letters to WMXJ-FM, changing the format to adult contemporary as "Majic 102", and upgraded their signal, moving the station to the master antenna system serving South Florida, the result of another station moving from 92.1 to 92.3. In 1986, the station migrated to a full-time 50s and 60s oldies format as "Majic 102.7", and was commercially successful in the 25-54 demographic through 1991.

In 1994, the station was sold to Jefferson-Pilot Communications. In 2006, Jefferson-Pilot's television and radio operations were acquired as a division of Lincoln National Corporation and renamed Lincoln Financial Media. At that point, the station slowly transitioned from oldies to a classic hits format, playing less 50s and more 70s.

In 2012, Sam Zniber became Program Director, steadfastly rebooting the station as "Magic 102.7" (swapping the "j" with a "g") and added some 80s selections to the playlist; this resulted in steady growth, which led to a 5.1% share in December 2013 (from 2.8% in April 2012) in the Arbitron PPM ratings. In late 2013, the station rehired Ken Payne as Program Director who once held that position some 25 years prior. Payne tried to revitalize the station back to its former prestige by allowing some earlier 60s singles to be played despite an ever-changing radio demographic. Nevertheless, the station later described itself as a top 40 station aimed at adults, mainly playing hits from the 70s and 80s, with a small number of late 60s singles.

The lineup included former midday host Mindy Lang and prior evening host Vance Phillips paired together in morning drive, Joe Johnson in middays, and DJ Holiday (who had recently replaced longtime host Ron St. John) in the afternoons.

=== Purchase by Entercom ===
On December 8, 2014, Entercom announced that it was purchasing Lincoln Financial Media's entire 15-station lineup (including WMXJ) in a $106.5 million deal, and would operate the outlets under a local marketing agreement (LMA) until the sale was approved by the FCC. The sale was consummated on July 17, 2015.

On December 8, 2015, the entire air staff of WMXJ with the exception of DJ Holiday were told that they were being released. This led to rumors of a format change, despite having placed sixth in the November 2015 Nielsen Audio PPMs. WMXJ then ran a mix of classic hits and Christmas music with no live DJs through the rest of the month. On January 1, 2016, at midnight, WMXJ rebranded as "102.7 The Beach", keeping the classic hits format, but taking a decidedly more 80s-heavy approach. The last song on "Magic" was "The Tide Is High" by Blondie, while the first song on "The Beach" was "The Way You Make Me Feel" by Michael Jackson.
