= Storz (surname) =

Storz is a German surname, originating from the dialectal Alemannic word storz meaning "stalk" and "stump", which was "presumably a nickname for a short person" or "a person with a stiff, stubborn nature". In Germany there are 1486 people surnamed Storz, mostly concentrated in the southwest, in the state of Baden-Württemberg. As of 2010, there were 735 people in the United States with this surname. Variants of Storz include Stortz and Storts, with 953 and 891 bearers in the US in 2010, respectively.

== People ==
- Erik Storz (born 1975), American football player
- Gerhard Storz (1898–1983), German scholar and politician
- Gisela Storz, American microbiologist
- Gottlieb Storz (1852–1939), German-American entrepreneur
- Harry Werner Storz (1904–1982), German sprinter
- Ronald E. Storz (1933–1970), United States Air Force pilot
- Sybill Storz (1937–2025), German entrepreneur
- Thiemo Storz (born 1991), German racing driver
- Todd Storz (1924–1964), American radio executive
