= WFAW (Miami) =

Radio station in Miami, Florida (1922–1923)

WFAW was an AM radio station in Miami, Florida, licensed to The Miami Daily Metropolis newspaper. According to government records, the station—the fifth Florida radio broadcasting station—was first licensed on June 16, 1922, and was deleted on June 11, 1923. However, Fred W. Borton later claimed that WFAW had actually been first licensed to him in February 1921, and moreover, instead of being discontinued, should be considered to be the direct predecessor to another Miami station, WQAM, making WQAM "the first broadcasting station to be established in Florida".

== Origin ==
On December 1, 1921, the U.S. Department of Commerce, which regulated radio at this time, adopted the first regulations formally establishing a broadcasting station category, which set aside the wavelength of 360 meters (833 kHz) for entertainment broadcasts, and 485 meters (619 kHz) for market and weather reports. On June 16, 1922, WFAW was licensed to the Miami Daily Metropolis on the 360-meter "entertainment" wavelength. According to official government records, WFAW was the fifth Florida broadcasting station to receive a license under the new regulations, following WCAN in Jacksonville (May 8), WDAE in Tampa (May 15), WDAL in Jacksonville (May 19), and WEAT in Tampa (June 3). The WFAW call letters were randomly assigned from a sequential roster of available call signs.

However, an alternate explanation for WFAW's origin was later made by Fred W. Borton. In 1934 he was quoted as saying that he had been issued an earlier license, in February 1921, with the call sign of WFAW, although contemporary government records do not report the existence of any authorizations with the WFAW call letters prior to June 16, 1922.

== History ==
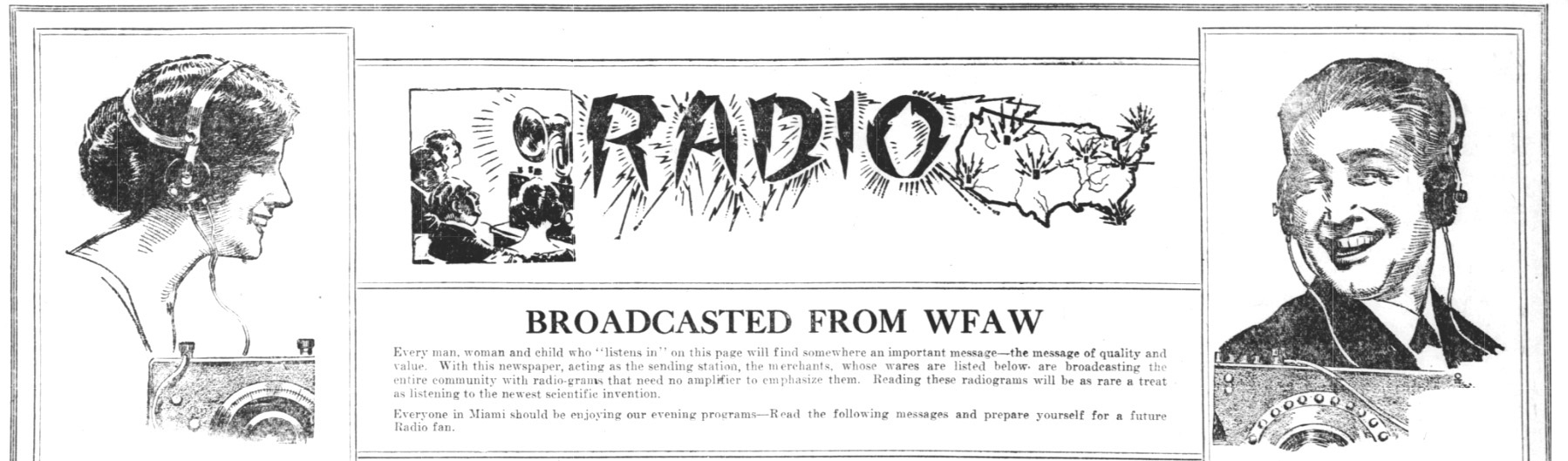
Miami Metropolis promotional advertisement for WFAW and radio.

On June 7, 1922, the Miami Daily Metropolis reported that test broadcasts had begun the previous night of its new "radiophone transmitting station". The transmitter was located on the ground floor of the newspaper building, with installation overseen by Kenneth Richardson of the Boward Electrical Company.

Following an additional series of tests, regular programming was begun on June 17. Nine days later it was announced that for WFAW, "Beginning today, and every day hereafter, the order of broadcasting by The Metropolis station is as follows: 12 noon—Weather reports; 2 p. m.—News bulletins; 5 p. m.—Market and late sporting and late news features; 7:30 to 9:30 p. m.—Musical programs and other features".

On December 9, 1922, the newspaper announced that broadcasts over WFAW were being suspended, pending a move to a new Electrical Equipment Company location, with the existing WFAW transmitter to be dismantled. On January 27, 1923, the Metropolis reported that a 100 watt transmitter to be used by the newspaper's broadcast service, that was designed and built by F. W. Borton of the Electrical Equipment Company and installed at Electrical Equipment's offices at Northwest Fourth Street, would make its debut broadcast the next evening.

Two days later, the newspaper wrote: "With the completion of the enlarged radio plant of The Miami Daily Metropolis and Electrical Equipment Company, The Metropolis announces that the government has granted a new charter and also changed the station number to (WQAM). The station number until today was (WFAW)." However, WQAM was licensed to the Electrical Equipment Company, and WFAW to the Miami Daily Metropolis, and government regulators at the time considered them to be separate stations, so the two are reported individually in a March 1, 1923, government listing of active licenses. Thus, the FCC History Cards documenting WQAM's records list January 23, 1923, as its "Date First Licensed", corresponding with the first license issued with the WQAM call letters.

According to government records, WFAW was deleted on June 11, 1923.

== See also ==
- List of initial AM-band station grants in the United States
