= WAXY (AM) =

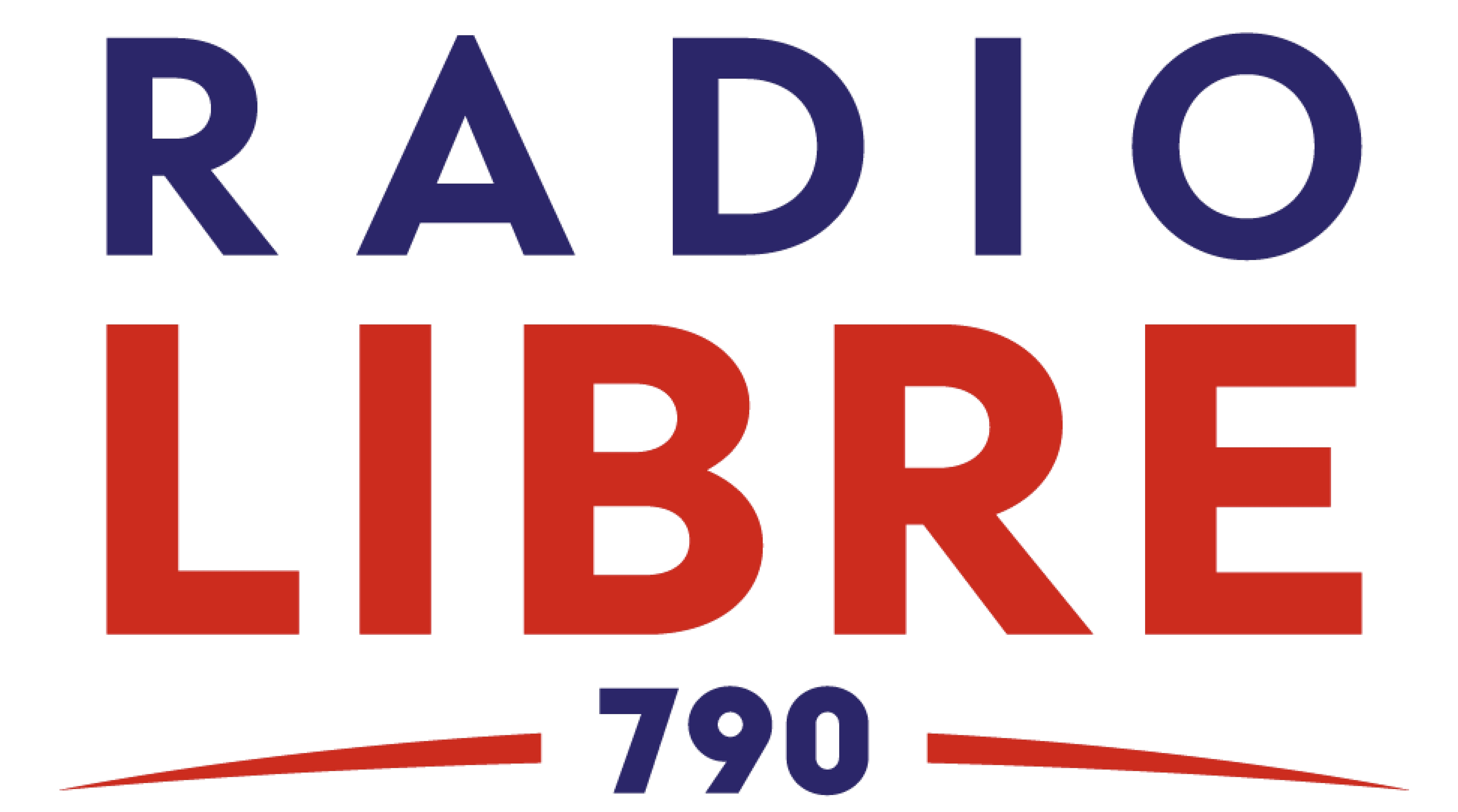
- South Miami, Florida; United States
- Broadcast area: South Florida
- Frequency: 790 kHz
- Branding: Radio Libre 790

Programming
- Language: Spanish
- Format: Adult contemporary and conservative talk radio

Ownership
- Owner: Audacy, Inc.; (Audacy License, LLC)
- Sister stations: WKIS; WLYF; WMXJ; WPOW; WQAM; WQAM-FM

History
- First air date: 1939
- Former call signs: WMBM (1939–1961); WFUN (1961–1976); WNWS (1976–1990); WMRZ (1990–1994)
- Former frequencies: 800 kHz (1939–1961)

Technical information
- Licensing authority: FCC
- Facility ID: 30837
- Class: B
- Power: 5,000 watts (licensed); 25,000 watts (STA)
- Transmitter coordinates: 25°45′25.4″N 80°38′21.2″W
- Repeater: 96.5 WPOW-FM HD2 (Miami)

Links
- Public license information: Public file; LMS
- Webcast: Listen live (via Audacy); Listen live (via iHeartRadio)
- Website: www.audacy.com/radiolibre790

WAXY (790 kHz) is an AM radio station licensed to South Miami, Florida, with a Spanish adult contemporary and conservative talk radio format. The station is owned by Audacy, Inc. Its studios are located in Audacy's Miami office on Northwest Second Avenue, and its transmitter is in Everglades National Park.

The callsign was formerly used on FM at 105.9, until Jefferson-Pilot acquired the callsign. That station, now WBGG-FM and owned by iHeartMedia with a classic rock format, is not affiliated with the current WAXY.

== History ==
This station was once WFUN, a legendary Top 40 station that competed with WQAM. Originally, the station was located at 800 on the AM dial, and was a daytime-only operation. While on 800, it was licensed to Miami Beach and was the first station in the area to hold the WMBM callsign, which is now on 1490 kHz. In the early 1960s, the station migrated down to 790, and went full-time as WFUN. The 790 frequency was a moderately directional signal, as there was already a 790 in Havana, Cuba, and another in central Florida (Leesburg-Eustis). Despite coverage limitations, especially to the southwest (in the Florida Keys, toward Havana), WFUN competed vigorously with WQAM throughout the 1960s, and even won some of the ratings sweeps. During the early 1970s, pop music showed up first on FM at WMYQ, and then on WHYI-FM, and the field of top 40 stations (including WQAM and even WINZ for a brief time) became crowded; ultimately many listeners moved to FM for music, and on January 7, 1976, WFUN abandoned its top 40 format for an Adult Standards/MOR format. WFUN was used by one of its disc jockeys to create the Boss Radio broadcasting sound of Swinging Radio England from the coast of southern England during 1966. For a short time in 1965 Morton 'Doc' Downey was a DJ on this Miami station.

WFUN was the home of several DJs who became famous on both sides of the Atlantic in 1966. They included Ron O'Quinn and Larry Dean. The format of WFUN in Miami was used in part by Ron O'Quinn as the foundation for the hybrid mix of sounds that were heard over the 50,000 watts offshore pirate radio station Swinging Radio England between May and November 1966. Morning man Bruce Bartley later moved to Atlanta at WSB as the voice of the news and later Program Director of WCNN.

Also in 1976, the station became WNWS with a news/talk format. Miami talk show legend Neil Rogers hosted his own show and did play-by-play announcing for the Miami Hurricanes baseball team on WNWS from 1978 to 1984. Popular talk show host Tom Leykis was heard in the early 1980s. It changed back to music and became WMRZ ("790 Memories") on October 25, 1990, running "AM Only", a Satellite-based Adult Standards format from the Unistar radio network (now America's Best Music from Westwood One).

WMRZ switched to a schedule of brokered programming in September 1993, and became WAXY on October 12, 1994 (after the original WAXY on FM abandoned that callsign), airing an eclectic mix of shows from investments, sports, radio theater, religion as well as a mixed bag of music shows including hip hop, Cajun/zydeco, oldies and gospel.

=== As a sports station ===
From September 1, 2004, to October 3, 2022, WAXY was an sports radio station. At one point, the station was branded as "ESPN Radio 790", but then stopped carrying ESPN Radio programs in favor of Fox Sports Radio, then carried the Sporting News Radio shows of Todd Wright and David Stein, and then returned to ESPN Radio after WQAM took the Sporting News Radio affiliation.

The weekday lineup was mainly local, with hosts Jonathan Zaslow and former NFL lineman Brett Romberg with South Florida sports personality Amber Wilson, with guest hosts such as ESPN columnist Israel Gutierrez; Miami Herald sportswriter Dan LeBatard with the nationally syndicated and flagship home for The Dan Le Batard Show with Stugotz; former NFL Running back Leroy Hoard and radio personality Brian "The Beast" London host a show with Zaslow show producer Brendon Tobin; longtime sports talk show host Curtis Stevenson host the weekly afternoon/evening shows. Zach Duarte hosted the weeknight shows and hosts such as Greg Likens host on weekends.

The station was the flagship station for the Miami Marlins after they were not renewed by WQAM at the request of the Miami Dolphins, back in 2007. On November 6, 2013, WINZ announced that they became the new flagship station for the Marlins, ending a 5-year relationship with The Ticket.

During the 2010–11 season, WAXY took over as the Miami Heat's flagship station due to a dispute with previous station WINZ.

On August 29, 2012, the station began an FM simulcast on 104.3 WMSF as WAXY-FM, after the station was acquired by WAXY's parent company Lincoln Financial Media. The Miami Herald reported that the company intended to move the sports format to FM full-time (with 790 breaking away for a new format) after it completed the re-location of its city of license to within the Miami market. Until then, WAXY would not be able to carry certain sports properties on FM due to rights conflicts with WEFL. On December 8, 2014, Entercom announced its intent to acquire Lincoln Financial Media. The transition of The Ticket to FM would not be realized: shortly after the completion of the sale, WAXY-FM broke away from the simulcast in August 2015, and flipped to alternative rock as 104.3 The Shark.

In November 2017, Entercom merged with CBS Radio, owner of WQAM. On August 2, 2019, Entercom announced that WAXY would introduce a new lineup on August 5, assuming WQAM's CBS Sports Radio affiliation and most of its local hosts, and moving ESPN Radio, including The Dan Le Batard Show and the network's overnight and weekend programming, to WQAM (which concurrently rebranded as The Joe). Due to the changes, The Dan Le Batard Show discontinued the local-only hour it had historically produced (although it was allowed to air its local hour on WAXY one last time on August 5 as a "farewell").

On October 26, 2021, most of WAXY's local programming was moved back to WQAM, with WAXY introducing a new weekday lineup primarily featuring sports betting-oriented shows from Audacy's BetQL Network, and The Jim Rome Show from CBS Sports Radio at middays. After having been simulcast in full by both stations since August 2020, due to a realignment of ESPN Radio's schedule, Hochman & Crowder's first hour became exclusive to WQAM.

=== As a Spanish station ===
On September 29, 2022, Americano Media and Audacy agreed to launch the former's Spanish-language conservative talk radio format similar to Fox News's opinion programming via WAXY on October 3 through a time brokerage agreement. Americano was generally unsuccessful at marketing the format altogether, and Americano ceased its lease at the start of September 2023. Audacy has since maintained an automated Spanish oldies format in the meantime, along with using WAXY as an overflow station for English-language sports play-by-play coverage. Local talent has been added on November 29, bringing the conservative format back part-time. The two hosts heard during the day are Lourdes Ubieta and Jorge Bonilla, previously heard on the station via Americano Media prior to the recent changes.

== Interference from Cuba and temporary power increase ==
WAXY has been operating under special temporary authority from the FCC since December 1981. The temporary authority allows an increased power level of 25,000 watts both day and night. This "temporary" increase was granted by the FCC to offset interference to WAXY from a Cuban radio station.
