= WLYF =

Adult contemporary radio station in Miami

- Miami, Florida; United States
- Broadcast area: South Florida
- Frequency: 101.5 MHz (HD Radio)
- Branding: 101.5 Lite FM

Programming
- Language: English
- Format: Adult contemporary
- Subchannels: HD2: The Voice of the Caribbean
- Affiliations: Compass Media Networks

Ownership
- Owner: Audacy, Inc.; (Audacy License, LLC)
- Sister stations: WAXY; WKIS; WMXJ; WPOW; WQAM; WQAM-FM

History
- First air date: April 1948
- Former call signs: WWPB-FM (1948–1970)
- Call sign meaning: "Life" (former branding)

Technical information
- Licensing authority: FCC
- Facility ID: 30827
- Class: C1
- ERP: 100,000 watts
- HAAT: 248 meters (814 ft)
- Transmitter coordinates: 25°58′1.2″N 80°12′43.2″W
- Translator: HD2: 96.9 W245BC (Lauderdale Lakes)

Links
- Public license information: Public file; LMS
- Webcast: Listen live (via Audacy)
- Website: www.audacy.com/litemiami; HD2: voiceofthecaribbean.com

WLYF (101.5 FM, "101.5 Lite FM") is a commercial radio station in Miami, Florida. Owned by Audacy, Inc., it broadcasts an adult contemporary radio format. WLYF's studios and offices are co-located with its Audacy sister stations on NE 2nd Avenue in Miami.

WLYF has an effective radiated power (ERP) of 100,000 watts. The transmitter is off NW 210th Street in Miami Gardens. WLYF broadcasts in the HD Radio hybrid format. Its HD2 subchannel formerly carried a soft adult contemporary format, known as "Today's Life". currently carries a Caribbean radio format, known as "The Voice of the Caribbean."

== History ==
=== WWPB-FM ===
In April 1948, the station signed on the air as WWPB-FM, owned and operated by Paul Brake (with his initials reflected in the call sign). It was the FM counterpart to WWPB (1450 AM, now WKAT) and ran at 8,500 watts, a fraction of its current power. It was one of only three FM stations on the air in Miami in the post-war years and it mostly simulcast WWPB.

In the late 1950s, WWPB-FM became a classical music station, affiliating with WQXR in New York City, which had a network of classical programming for FM stations. When that service ended, WWPB-FM continued on its own as a classical outlet. In the 1960s, the station boosted its power to 31,000 watts but on a tower of 285 feet, so the station's coverage was only limited to Miami and its closer suburbs.

=== Beautiful music WLYF ===
In April 1970, Sudbrink Broadcasting acquired the station. It was paired with AM 1550 WRIZ (now WRHC) in Coral Gables, Florida, which Sudbrink had bought the year before. In December 1970, the call letters were changed to WLYF. The city of license was switched to Coral Gables to match WRIZ. WLYF adopted a beautiful music format produced and distributed by Stereo Radio Productions. WLYF was known promotionally for many years as "Life", until the current "Lite FM" name was adopted.

Sudbrink relocated WLYF to the WLBW television tower and increased its effective radiated power to 100,000 watts, allowing it to be widely heard in Fort Lauderdale and picked up in West Palm Beach. The beautiful music format proved to be popular, especially among Miami's large retired community. WLYF became the first FM radio station in a Top 25 radio market to achieve a number one audience rating.

In 1978, the station was sold to Storer Communications. Storer also owned WGBS in Miami (710 AM, now WAQI), so WLYF's city of license switched back to Miami.

In 1979, WLYF was purchased by Jefferson-Pilot Broadcasting (later Lincoln Financial Media). The studios were moved to NW Second Avenue in North Dade, near what is now Hard Rock Stadium.

=== Switch to adult contemporary ===
By the late 1980s, the audience for easy listening stations was getting older; in response, WLYF gradually added more soft rock vocals and decreased instrumentals. By the early 1990s, WLYF had made the transition to a soft adult contemporary format, now known as "101.5 LITE-FM". During this time, programming vet Rob Sidney replaced Larry Travers, who had supervised the easy listening format. Sidney guided the station to an all-vocal format with a more upbeat delivery. By the early 2000s, Sidney moved the station to a mainstream AC format.

On December 8, 2014, Entercom announced that it was purchasing Lincoln Financial Group's entire 15-station lineup (including WLYF) in a $106.5 million deal. It would operate the outlets under a local marketing agreement (LMA) until the sale was approved by the Federal Communications Commission (FCC). The sale was consummated on July 17, 2015.

== Christmas music ==
In the late 1990s and early 2000s, many AC stations around the U.S. and Canada began following a practice to devote the weeks from mid-November until December 25 to all-Christmas music. Until 2018, WLYF was a rare AC station that did not switch its format. During the holiday season, WLYF would usually play Christmas music during the evening hours and weekends.

That all changed on November 21, 2018, when WLYF announced that it would play Christmas music full-time for the holiday season. Unlike most markets in the United States and Canada, full-time Christmas music stations have been inconsistent and rare in Miami. The last station to go all-Christmas was active rocker WHDR (93.1 FM), doing it for one season as it made the transition in 2010 to soft adult contemporary WFEZ. In 2019, WLYF made the switch to all-Christmas music on the Monday before Thanksgiving, November 25.

In 2023, WLYF discontinued the full-time Christmas music tradition. They opted to instead only sprinkle in Christmas songs with their regular format, but did play continuous Christmas songs on the weekends.
