= WKIS =

Radio station in Boca Raton, Florida

- Boca Raton, Florida; United States
- Broadcast area: South Florida
- Frequency: 99.9 MHz (HD Radio)
- Branding: Kiss Country 99.9

Programming
- Language: English
- Format: Country music
- Subchannels: HD4: Israel Radio Miami

Ownership
- Owner: Audacy, Inc.; (Audacy License, LLC)
- Sister stations: WAXY; WLYF; WMXJ; WPOW; WQAM; WQAM-FM

History
- First air date: September 1, 1965
- Former call signs: WWOG (1965–1979); WKQS-FM (1979–1986); WKQS (1986–1988)
- Call sign meaning: "Kiss"

Technical information
- Licensing authority: FCC
- Facility ID: 64001
- Class: C0
- ERP: 98,400 watts
- HAAT: 302.4 meters (992 ft)
- Transmitter coordinates: 25°59′34.8″N 80°10′26.4″W
- Translator: HD4: 107.1 W296DK (Fort Lauderdale)

Links
- Public license information: Public file; LMS
- Webcast: Listen live (via Audacy)
- Website: www.audacy.com/wkis israeliradiomiami.com (HD4)

WKIS (99.9 FM) is a commercial radio station licensed to Boca Raton, Florida, and serving South Florida. It is owned by Audacy, Inc. and airs a country music radio format. Its studios are located in Audacy's Miami office on Northeast Second Avenue. The transmitter tower is off NW 210 Street in Miami Gardens, shared with WTVJ.

WKIS broadcasts in the HD Radio format. Its HD2 subchannel formerly carried the sports radio programming of co-owned WQAM. Its HD3 subchannel formerly carried the national sports gambling programming as "The Bet". Its HD4 subchannel carries Israeli programming.

== History ==
=== WWOG ===
The station first signed on the air on September 1, 1965 as WWOG. It was originally a non-commercial Christian radio station, owned by Homer and Carole Akers. In the 1970s, it was a beautiful music outlet, still owned by the Akers, under the corporate name WWOG, Inc.

=== Country music ===
In 1979, WWOG was bought by the Sunshine Wireless Company. The new owner changed its call sign to WKQS-FM, and switched it to easy listening as "Kiss-FM". The WWOG call letters were later transferred to a new non-commercial religious radio station at 88.1, owned by the Boca Raton Christian School. The format was switched to country music in September 1981.

In 1985 Sunshine Wireless bought WQAM (560 AM). WQAM had been a long-time Top 40 station but Sunshine switched it to country music. Sunshine now had an AM country station, with personality DJs, NBC Radio News and local information, as well as WKQS, an FM country station, with less chatter and more current country hits.

In 1988, WKQS changed call letters to WKIS. Around this time, WQAM would leave the country music format, first playing oldies and then switching to sports. This left WKIS as Miami's only country music outlet.

=== Ownership changes ===
The Beasley Broadcast Group bought both WKIS and WQAM in the late 1990s, but continued the country music and sports formats on each station. The studios and offices were moved to Sheridan Street in Hollywood.

On October 2, 2014, Beasley announced that it would trade five radio stations in Philadelphia and Miami, including WKIS, to CBS Radio, in exchange for 14 stations located in Tampa, Charlotte and Philadelphia. The swap was completed on December 1, 2014.

On February 2, 2017, CBS Radio announced it would merge with Entercom. The merger was approved on November 9, 2017, and was consummated on November 17.
