= Jonathan Zaslow =

American radio personality

Jonathan Bradley Zaslow (born January 18, 1981, in Miami, Florida) is a sports radio show host in South Florida. Also known as the "Cooper City Rattlesnake." Formerly the host of "The Zaslow Show" and "The Zaslow and Joy Show", is one of the former hosts of "Zaslow & Amber" on 790/104.3 The Ticket Miami, weekdays from 10am to 2pm, with Amber Wilson.

Zaslow was raised in North Miami Beach, Florida, where he attended Sabal Palm Elementary School and was a classmate of James Jones of the Miami Heat and 2011 NBA three point shootout champion. He graduated from North Miami Beach Senior High School in 1999 and was a member of the varsity basketball team. However, he was only put in the games during blowout situations. After graduating from the University of Florida in 2004, he became a producer at the newly formed 790 The Ticket, where he has been ever since.

Zaslow originally was a producer for Craig Minervini and then became a producer for The Boog Sciambi Show hosted by Jon Sciambi. Sciambi frequently incorporated Zaslow into his show, and eventually Zaslow became known as Sciambi's "sidekick." Zas eventually got his own show from 7pm-10pm on weekdays and in June 2012, was promoted to morning drive.

Formerly, during the NHL season he hosted Panthers Unrestricted Weekend every Saturday from 9-10am with Florida Panthers play-by-play man Randy Moller where the duo looked at everything revolving around the Panthers. Zaslow also served as the Studio Host for the Florida Panthers Radio Network from 2008-2010.

Since 2010, he has been the Miami Heat Radio Host, anchoring the pregame, halftime, and postgame shows for the Miami Heat Radio Network and on FM 104.3/AM 790 The Ticket.

In 2013, Zaslow was picked as the Broward Palm Beach New Times AM Radio Host of the Year.
