= WPOW =

Radio station in Miami, Florida

- Miami, Florida; United States
- Broadcast area: Miami metropolitan area
- Frequency: 96.5 MHz (HD Radio)
- Branding: Power 96

Programming
- Language: English
- Format: Classic urban contemporary
- Subchannels: HD2: Spanish adult contemporary music and conservative talk radio (WAXY); HD3: Channel Q

Ownership
- Owner: Audacy, Inc.; (Audacy License, LLC)
- Sister stations: WAXY; WKIS; WLYF; WMXJ; WQAM; WQAM-FM

History
- First air date: June 15, 1985
- Former call signs: WCJX (1985–1986)
- Former frequencies: 96.3 MHz (1985–1986)
- Call sign meaning: Power

Technical information
- Licensing authority: FCC
- Facility ID: 73893
- Class: C
- ERP: 98,000 watts
- HAAT: 307 meters (1,007 ft)
- Transmitter coordinates: 25°58′3.3″N 80°12′33.2″W

Links
- Public license information: Public file; LMS
- Webcast: Listen live (via Audacy)
- Website: www.audacy.com/power96

WPOW (96.5 FM) – branded Power 96 – is a commercial classic hip-hop radio station licensed to Miami, Florida. Owned by Audacy, Inc., the station serves Miami-Dade County, the Miami metropolitan area, and much of surrounding South Florida. WPOW's studios are located in Audacy's Miami office on Northeast Second Avenue, while the station's transmitter is located in the Miami Gardens neighborhood of Andover.

== History ==
=== 96.3 FM (1948–1981) ===
WGBS-FM (96.3) began broadcasting in 1948 as the FM simulcast partner to WGBS (710 AM). It was owned by Storer Broadcasting until the company sold it in 1971 to Bartell Broadcasting. Bartell changed the station, then known as WJHR, into WMYQ, an aggressive Top 40/CHR outlet; the station became known as WMJX in October 1975. An April 1975 use of fake newscasts to promote a contest and fraudulent billing issues led to the Federal Communications Commission refusing to renew WMJX's license, and the station ceased operations on February 15, 1981.

A multi-year fight between applicants ensued for the right to build a station on the frequency. In 1985, Constance J. Wodlinger moved to buy out all of the competing applicants and win the frequency.

=== WCJX/WPOW ===
On June 15, 1985, Wodlinger returned 96.3 MHz to the air as WCJX, using the same "96X" moniker that WMJX had used from 1975 to 1981. Technically, WCJX broadcast from all-new studios and the then-new Guy Gannett master candelabra tower. In programming terms, the new station got attention in the marketplace with "The Super 16", a tight rotation of the 16 top hits that ran commercial-free for its early months on the air. WCJX's programming was so tight that the station even placed song schedules in the Miami Herald.

The $2.95 million investment Wodlinger made in buying out her competitors paid off when Beasley Broadcast Group acquired the new station in September 1985 for $10.6 million. On August 4, 1986, at 7 a.m., Beasley flipped the station to a dance-leaning CHR format under the name "Power 96, Miami's fresh new music mix", with a change in call letters to WPOW. It played mostly Dance, Pop, Freestyle, R&B, Rap, and a dose of rock-centric type hits that became mass appeal enough to incorporate into the playlist. The first song on "Power 96" was "Rumors" by Timex Social Club. "Power 96" embraced the regionally blossoming Miami Bass sound as well, mixing it into the playlist. The moniker and nickname "Power 96" was the idea of new owner and general manager Gregory Reed saying that Miami and other parts of Southern Florida has a multidiversed musical genre variety and it has unleashed a pure music energy within, and he decided to name "Power 96" in honor for the love of the blended dose of all types of music that is awakening Miami's raw hit music power.

==== Frequency change ====
WPOW moved from 96.3 MHz to its present-day 96.5 MHz frequency in the spring of 1987. Founding general manager Gregory Reed was originally a part-owner of Beasley-Reed Broadcasting. Later, Reed sold his share of the station to Beasley, but remained as vice president and general manager. The original programming team was a combination of two of WHYI-FM's alums: Program Director and initial morning jock Bill Tanner and Music Director Colleen "The Vinyl Queen" Cassidy, as well as radio programming consultant, Jerry Clifton of New World Communications, who was also one of founders of the growing "CHUrban" (also known as "Crossover") phenomenon. Clifton continued to help program WPOW until CBS Radio acquired the station in 2014.

WPOW has included a number of Spanish-language songs in its playlist, including Ivy Queen's 2003 hit "Quiero Bailar" (I Want To Dance), which became the first all Spanish-language song to reach No. 1 on a Rhythmic Top 40 station.

==== Ownership changes ====
On October 2, 2014, Beasley Broadcasting announced that it would trade five radio stations in Philadelphia and Miami (including WPOW) to CBS Radio in exchange for 14 stations located in Tampa, Charlotte and Philadelphia. The swap was completed on December 1, 2014. After the ownership change, WPOW began shifting to a more Mainstream Top 40/CHR direction with an increasing amount of Pop product, resulting in Mediabase moving the station to its top 40/CHR panel in November 2015. The station continued to report to Nielsen BDS' Rhythmic Chart until it was moved to the mainstream top 40/CHR panel in June 2016.

On February 2, 2017, CBS Radio announced it would merge with Entercom; The merger was approved on November 9, 2017, and was consummated on November 17.

==== 2023-2024 format shifts ====
In May 2023, the station gradually shifted its CHR format to a rhythmic-leaning hot AC format under the slogan "Miami's Party Station", mirroring a similar shift at Chicago sister station WBBM-FM, significantly expanding the playlist to include more throwback hits from the 1990s onward. While the station continued to play four current/recurrent hits per hour, the top currents were reduced from around 90 plays a week down to about 60.

On May 23, 2024, at 5 pm, after playing "Creepin'" by Metro Boomin, The Weeknd and 21 Savage, WPOW dropped all remaining current music and shifted to a classic hip-hop format, while retaining the "Power 96" branding. The first song after the relaunch was "Take It To Da House" by Miami native Trick Daddy.

== HD Radio ==
The HD2 digital subchannel airs a simulcast of sister station WAXY, while the HD3 channel carries Audacy's national Channel Q service.
