= WQAM-FM =

Radio station in Miramar, Florida

Simulcasts WQAM (AM) Miami
- Miramar, Florida; United States
- Broadcast area: Miami-Fort Lauderdale metropolitan area
- Frequency: 104.3 MHz (HD Radio)
- Branding: 104.3 WQAM

Programming
- Language: English
- Format: Sports radio
- Subchannels: HD2: Sports gambling "The Bet"; HD4: Dance/EDM (WZFL)
- Affiliations: BetMGM Network; Westwood One Sports; Florida Panthers; Miami Hurricanes; Miami Heat

Ownership
- Owner: Audacy, Inc.; (Audacy License, LLC)
- Sister stations: WAXY; WKIS; WLYF; WMXJ; WPOW; WQAM

History
- First air date: August 30, 1969
- Former call signs: WEAT-FM (1969–2012); WMSF (2012); WAXY-FM (2012–2015); WSFS (2015–2025)
- Call sign meaning: Derived from WQAM (AM)

Technical information
- Licensing authority: FCC
- Facility ID: 29567
- Class: C1
- ERP: 100,000 watts
- HAAT: 283 meters (928 ft)
- Transmitter coordinates: 25°59′10.3″N 80°11′36.2″W
- Translator: HD4: 93.5 W228BY (Miami)

Links
- Public license information: Public file; LMS
- Webcast: Listen live (via Audacy); HD2: Listen live (via Audacy)
- Website: www.audacy.com/wqam

WQAM-FM (104.3 MHz, "104.3 WQAM") is a commercial radio station licensed to Miramar, Florida. Owned by Audacy, Inc., the station broadcasts a sports radio format simulcasting WQAM targeting Miami-Dade County and the Miami-Fort Lauderdale metropolitan area. Its studios are located in Audacy's Miami office on Northeast Second Avenue, while the station's transmitter is located in nearby Pembroke Park. Weekdays begin with The Joe Rose Show, hosted by the former Miami Dolphins tight end. He is followed by Tobin & Leroy (Brendan Tobin and Leroy Hoard). In afternoon drive time, Hochman, Crowder & Solana (Marc Hochman, Channing Crowder, Alejandro Solana) are heard. Nights and weekends feature syndicated shows from the Westwood One Sports and the BetMGM Network. WQAM and WQAM-FM are the flagship stations for the Miami Heat basketball team.

== History ==
=== WEAT-FM in West Palm Beach ===
WEAT-FM in West Palm Beach began broadcasting at 104.5 MHz at 6 a.m. on September 29, 1969. The station, sister to WEAT (850 AM), was an automated beautiful music outlet with syndicated programming supplied by Quality Music, Inc. The station broadcast from the tallest tower in the Palm Beaches and cost $175,000 to build. Within a year, WEAT-FM and WOOD-FM in Grand Rapids, Michigan, were among the first two FM stations to claim overall ratings leadership in their markets. WEAT-AM-FM was purchased four years later by Curt Gowdy for $1.5 million. WEAT-FM was later the second client of Jim Schulke's beautiful music syndication business. The FM station was a continual ratings winner in the beautiful music format as late as 1985.

On July 31, 1986, WEAT-FM moved to 104.3 MHz in advance of moving its transmitter to a higher tower in Lake Worth, Florida, which would improve coverage in Broward County; the move also allowed WHQT (105.1 FM) to improve its own signal, as that station relocated to the new Guy Gannett master tower further north from its existing site. The move paid off for Gowdy, who sold WEAT-AM-FM to Taylor Communications in 1986 for $13.5 million. WEAT continued to be a strong performer in the Palm Beach radio market, nearly doubling its nearest competitor in 1989 and was described the next year as the market's "800-pound gorilla".

The first major format adjustment in station history was made in 1992, when WEAT-FM became soft adult contemporary "Sunny 104.3"; the change was made in order to attract a younger audience than the aging listenership its beautiful music programming attracted. Three years later, the station was bought by OmniAmerica Group, which promptly merged with Citicasters At this time, the station recovered from a brief slide to fourth place by hiring away Kevin Kitchens and Jennifer Ross, who had been the morning hosts at WRMF. Within months, Chancellor Broadcasting, which resulted from the merger, had a deal to trade its three West Palm Beach radio stations to American Radio Systems in exchange for a station in California and $33 million. The next year, CBS bought the entire American Radio Systems group in a $2.6 billion transaction; however, WEAT AM was sold off to Clear Channel by way of Paxson Communications. Kitchens and Ross remained the station's morning duo until the former died on February 3, 1999, of a heart attack at the age of 39; hours earlier, he had discussed a procedure that was to have been performed on him later that morning on the air.

The next year, Jennifer Ross left the station. Her last show at WEAT was on September 25; the next day, she immediately returned to WRMF to do mornings. WEAT sued, claiming a violation of her non-compete clause; Ross's lawyers charged that the station misrepresented contests and failed to give her promised vacation time. In February 2001, an appeals court found against Ross, stating that she should be barred from appearing on WRMF for a year. For violating the order, Ross faced contempt of court charges. In 2005, a jury awarded WEAT $17.2 million—more than the $13.3 million it had asked for—in damages. Damages were revised down to $7 million in 2008 after the prior verdict was set aside by an appeals court. However, the appeals court tossed out that ruling in 2010.

=== Move to Miami ===
In 2012, CBS Radio, citing a desire to focus on larger markets, sold its entire cluster in West Palm Beach to Palm Beach Broadcasting for $50 million. The sale included WEAT's programming and call sign, but as Palm Beach already owned one FM station (WRMF), it had to divest two of CBS's stations to other buyers. Because the 104.3 FM facility could be moved into the Miami market, it was tagged for sale. On June 1, 2012, Sunny and the WEAT call letters moved from 104.3 to 107.9 MHz, the former home of country station WIRK, which in turn moved to 103.1 MHz, marking the end for former hot adult contemporary station WPBZ.

=== Smooth FM ===
With WEAT now at 107.9, 104.3 temporarily flipped to a jazz/adult contemporary hybrid known as "Smooth FM" and adopted the call letters WMSF. The first song on WMSF was "Baby, I Love Your Way" by Big Mountain. On August 24, Palm Beach Broadcasting announced its intention to sell WMSF to Lincoln Financial Media for $13 million.

=== The Ticket ===
Five days later, on August 29, at 5 p.m., after playing "Caribbean Breeze" by The Rippingtons, WMSF began simulcasting Lincoln Financial-owned sports radio station WAXY, branded as "790 & 104.3 The Ticket", and changed its call letters to WAXY-FM two days later. The purchase of WAXY-FM was consummated on December 10, 2012; on September 19, 2013, WAXY-FM completed its move to the Miami-Fort Lauderdale market with its city of license changing to Miramar. On December 8, 2014, Entercom announced that it was purchasing Lincoln Financial Group's entire 15-station lineup (including WAXY-FM) in a $106.5 million deal, and would operate the outlets under a local marketing agreement until the sale was approved by the Federal Communications Commission. The sale was approved on July 14, 2015.

=== The Shark ===
On August 21, 2015, at 11 a.m., WAXY-FM changed its format to alternative rock, branded as "104.3 The Shark", launching with 5,000 songs in a row commercial free. This marked the first alternative rock station in the Miami-Fort Lauderdale radio market since February 11, 2005, when WZTA flipped to Reggaeton, becoming WMGE. The first song played on "The Shark" was "Radioactive" by Imagine Dragons. The WAXY simulcast was moved to the HD-2 digital subchannel. On August 28, WAXY-FM changed its call letters to WSFS to match the "Shark" branding.

In September 2020, most of the local DJs and programming staff were dismissed and replaced by out-of-market staff; this airstaff, anchored mostly by Audacy national format staffers, would serve the station's format through the end of its run.

=== WQAM-FM ===
On August 7, 2025, at 1:04 pm, after playing "Good Riddance (Time of Your Life)" by Green Day and the opening moments of "Man in The Box" by Alice in Chains (which would be abruptly cut off), WSFS dropped the alternative format and reverted to a sports radio format, this time as a simulcast of WQAM. With the change, WSFS adopted new call letters WQAM-FM on August 18.

The move was made to provide an FM home for the broadcasts of the longtime AM sports station's shows and affiliations. Most notably, it makes WQAM-FM the new FM broadcast flagship for the Miami Heat basketball team. The stations also carry Florida Panthers and Miami Hurricanes games. Local hosts are heard on weekdays, with nights and weekends featuring programming from the Infinity Sports Network and the BetMGM Network.
