= WDAL (Florida) =

Radio station in Jacksonville, Florida

WDAL was an AM radio station in Jacksonville, Florida, licensed to the Florida Times-Union beginning May 19, 1922, which was deleted on December 22, 1923, and temporarily reactivated in October 1925.

== History ==
On December 1, 1921, the U.S. Department of Commerce, which regulated radio at this time, adopted the first regulations formally establishing a broadcasting station category, which set aside the wavelength of 360 meters (833 kHz) for entertainment broadcasts, and 485 meters (619 kHz) for market and weather reports. WDAL was the third Florida broadcasting station to receive a license under the new regulations, which was issued for operation on both the 360 and 485 meter wavelengths on May 19, 1922, to the Jacksonville Florida Times-Union. The call letters were randomly assigned from a sequential roster of available call signs.

After a series of test transmissions, WDAL made its formal debut on May 23.

WDAL was deleted on December 22, 1923. However, in October 1925 the newspaper received authorization to temporarily revive the station, in order to broadcast World Series results.
