= Todd Storz =

American radio executive (1924–1964)

- Born: Robert Todd Storz; May 8, 1924; Omaha, Nebraska, U.S.
- Died: April 13, 1964 (aged 39); Miami Beach, Florida, U.S.
- Occupation: Radio broadcasting executive
- Years active: 1946–1964
- Organization: Storz Broadcasting Company
- Known for: Innovator of the Top 40 radio format

Robert Todd Storz (May 8, 1924 – April 13, 1964) headed a very successful chain of American radio broadcasting stations and is generally credited with being the foremost innovator of the Top 40 radio format in 1951. The selection of records to be played was based on sales reported by record stores, an indication as to which would be of greatest interest to listeners. Only the favorites would be played, in rotation. Some sources also credit his Omaha radio station as among the first to play at least some rock and roll records.

== Early years ==
Robert Todd Storz (known as Todd to avoid confusion with his father) was the grandson of Omaha brewer Gottlieb Storz. His father, Robert H. Storz, positioned himself as a “mover and shaker” in Omaha, Nebraska. He joined his eldest brother Adolph in running the Storz Brewing Company, and became active in local associations and activities. Indeed, Robert Storz played a role in getting the U.S. Air Force's Strategic Air Command (SAC) headquarters to relocate to Omaha in 1957. SAC's huge and growing payroll portended good business for Storz beer. Having no interest in the beer business, however, young Todd Storz was far more attracted to the potential of broadcast radio. He built a crude AM radio crystal receiver when he was only eight, and from then on, was “hooked” on radio.

In 1940 Todd passed the Federal Communications Commission (FCC) amateur ham radio license examination, and set up his receiver and transmitter on the third floor of the family home. Robert H. enrolled Todd at the prestigious Choate school in Connecticut, hoping that his son would pay more attention to academics than to radio. Instead, he became president of the Choate Radio Club. In 1942, he transferred to the University of Nebraska at Lincoln, where he put an unlicensed AM station on the air, though it was quickly shut down by the FCC. Todd enlisted in the Army in 1943 and served as a warrant officer junior grade in the Signal Corps. When he mustered out in 1946, he enrolled in a 12-week radio course sponsored by NBC and Northwestern University. Next, he took a low-paying “jack-of-all-trades” job at KWBW in Hutchinson, Kansas, to gain some commercial radio experience. He returned to Omaha in 1947 to take on a sales position at KFAB—and to marry Elizabeth Ann Trailer.

== Station Acquisitions and A New Sound ==
In mid-April 1949, Robert and Todd Storz announced their purchase of KOWH-AM and its FM companion outlet KOAD from the owners of the Omaha World Herald. The elder Storz was named president and his son became vice-president and general manager. For the first two years under Storz management, KOWH followed industry practice and offered a varied “conglomeration of programming” that resulted in only four percent of Omaha homes listening even once to the station in a sample week.

By mid-1951 however, KOWH began to turn around as Todd observed that audience ratings rose when recorded music was played but declined when talk shows were aired. He concluded that listeners wanted most to hear hit records. By the fall of 1953, all of KOWH's programming was being produced in-house, featuring local announcers, recorded popular music, and a wide array of promotional jingles. In an era when network and local radio were relying on a more staid variety of short programs designed to appeal to a specific slice of the available audience for a finite amount of time, the Storz operation offered a single program type—recorded hit music—during all of its broadcast hours. Ratings showed that KOWH's music appealed to the largest percentage of audience of any independent (non-network) radio outlet in the country.

Playing popular music, and repeating the top-selling (“Top-40”) hits most often, was the main engine driving KOWH's phenomenal audience growth. This was the beginning of a radio revolution, which would soon expand to six other Storz stations, beginning with WTIX, New Orleans in 1953, which also became phenomenally successful despite having a weak signal. Todd Storz went on to buy WHB in Kansas City in 1954, WDGY in Minneapolis/St. Paul in January 1956, WQAM in Miami in May 1956, KOMA in Oklahoma City in 1958, and KXOK in St. Louis in 1960. Most of the later acquisitions enjoyed top-notch technical facilities. Storz could easily afford their purchase. Other station operators took notice of the Storz phenomenon and began to program similar tightly-formatted Top-40 music.

== The Unraveling ==
In January 1961 Todd's wife of fourteen years filed for divorce. A month later Storz announced that the company had designated a Miami Beach building as the company's new national headquarters. In retrospect, there were several good reasons for Storz to move his home and office from Omaha to Miami Beach. Doing so would distance him from his failed marriage, remove him somewhat from his father's close scrutiny, provide him with a fresh location more in keeping with a modern, upbeat corporate identity, offer hoped-for relief from a persistent sinus condition and migraine headaches, and bring him closer to the woman who soon become his second wife–station WQAM's receptionist. But the changes were short-lived.

On April 13, 1964, Todd Storz was found dead at his Miami Beach home. He was about three and a half weeks shy of his 40th birthday. The coroner's report cited “pulmonary congestion and edema” and “marked coronary and aortic narrowing” as the probable causes. However, a second cause of death might have been barbiturate intoxication. The drug in question was Tuinal, which was sometimes prescribed to insomniacs to help induce sleep. Tuinal was known to be dangerous because the amount of the drug that induces drowsiness is only slightly less than the amount that can lead to death. But the specific cause of Todd's premature death was never determined.

Robert H. Storz took over the operation of the Storz Broadcasting Company, shifting the headquarters back to Omaha. With Todd gone, his vision, of how compelling radio could be, relied upon the station managers and staff he had trained. But, as former Storz station manager Deane Johnson later put it, “Todd's death [and the control of the radio stations falling to Todd's father] brought about a shift from a 'programming company' to a 'money company.' “ That is a succinct description of the shift in the Storz stations' focus that transpired after Todd's death.

Unfortunately, Robert Storz neither understood nor acknowledged that Top-40 programming was central to the success of the company Todd had run. Instead, the senior Storz complained that station managers were spending too much money. Indeed, he had such a programming "disconnect" on what the stations were doing that he once asked KXOK manager Jack Sampson if the station "could play some Lawrence Welk from time to time, or a lively Sousa march in the morning." The managers humored him and did whatever they could to keep the elder Storz from changing the established programming elements that had made the Storz organization so successful. But they could only do so much as their own influence waned in the 1970s.

== The Sell-Off ==
After years of declining audiences and revenues, the six Storz AM stations were sold between April 1984 and September 1985 for prices far below what they would have fetched during their heyday under Todd's guidance. The order in which the stations were sold, and their value in 2017 dollars is as follows: WTIX, New Orleans, $7,066,400; KOMA, Oklahoma City, $7,066,400; WDGY, Minneapolis, approximately $3,000,000; WHB, Kansas City, sale price not determined; KXOK, St. Louis, $4,710,933; and WQAM, Miami, $6,713,080.

The decline of the Storz Broadcasting Company is instructive because—as the saying goes--"It didn't have to be this way." If management had purchased FM facilities as the medium grew after 1970, and if inventive program directors and managers had been adequately supported, the company might have continued to be a programming innovator—not only retaining but further expanding its audience. Still, for nearly three decades, the Storz stations were the epitome of innovative, memorable, and delightful radio broadcasting. They were the most fun you could have with your ears.

== Legacy ==
Not often acknowledged in the Origins of rock and roll, Storz' station, and others which adopted the Top 40 format, helped to promote the genre: by the mid 50s, the playlist included artists such as "Presley, Lewis, Haley, Berry and Domino". The Top 40 format eventually spread across the US.

An article in the Spring 2012 issue of Nebraska History magazine offered this comment as to the importance of Storz' approach to programming: "the radio revolution that Storz began with KOWH was already sweeping the nation. Thousands of radio station owners had realized the enormous potential for a new kind of radio. When television became popular, social monitors predicted that radio would die. However, because of the invention of Storz and others like him, radio would be reborn".

== See also ==
- Gordon McLendon
