= WKAT (AM) =

Spanish-language religious radio station in Miami

Miami, Florida; United States
- Broadcast area: Miami area
- Frequency: 1450 kHz
- Branding: Vida 101.9 FM / 1450 AM

Programming
- Format: Spanish Christian radio

Ownership
- Owner: Nelson Voltaire; (Radio Piment Bouk, Inc.)
- Sister stations: WQVN

History
- First air date: December 6, 1947 (78 years ago)
- Former call signs: WWPB (1947–1956); WSKP (1956–1966); WOCN (1966–2019)

Technical information
- Licensing authority: FCC
- Facility ID: 43034
- Class: C
- Power: 1,000 watts
- Transmitter coordinates: 25°50′22″N 80°11′23″W
- Translators: W270CV (101.9 MHz, Miami)

Links
- Public license information: Public file; LMS
- Website: RadioVidaMiami.com

WKAT (1450 AM, "Radio Vida") is a radio station broadcasting a Spanish-language Christian radio format, known as "Radio Vida." Licensed to Miami, Florida, the station is owned by Nelson Volatire, through licensee Radio Piment Book, Inc.

WKAT broadcasts at 1,000 watts using a non-directional antenna. The transmitter is off NE 71st Street in Miami. Programming is also heard on FM translator W270CV at 101.9 MHz, with its tower on SE 2nd Street at Biscayne Boulevard.

== History ==
In December 6, 1947, the station first signed on the air as the 8th radio station in Miami. Its original call sign was WWPB and it was powered at only 250 watts. The call letters were chosen to represent its owner and general manager, Paul Brake. The following year, Brake put an FM station on the air, 101.5 WWPB-FM (today WLYF).

WOCN logo through June 2008

Around 2000, the station, known as WOCN, switched to Spanish-language programming. It was branded as "WOCN Radio 1450," broadcasting a talk radio format. It was a brokered programming station which sold its time to hosts who then sold their own advertisements to support their shows. The station was known in the Cuban-American community for its leftist commentators. It later switched to a sports radio format, using programming from the ESPN Deportes network.

Its call sign was changed to WKAT on September 16, 2019. The WKAT call letters were popular in Miami for many years on 1360 AM, which was a long-time English-language talk station that had been an early stopping point for broadcaster Larry King and others. That station is now WQVN, broadcasting to the Haitian community.

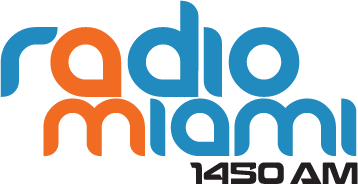
WOCN logo until 2019
