= Storz Brewing Company =

Brewery in North Omaha, Nebraska

- Company type: Private
- Industry: Beverages
- Founded: 1876-1972, 2013-2015
- Headquarters: Omaha, Nebraska, United States
- Key people: Gottlieb Storz (founder), Adolph Storz, Robert Storz
- Products: Beers, lagers, malt beverages
- Website: storzbrewing.com

The Storz Brewing Company was located at 1807 North 16th Street in North Omaha, Nebraska. Established from a company started in 1863, Storz Brewing began in 1876 by Gottlieb Storz and was owned by the Storz family until 1966; the brewery ceased operations in 1972. Their beers won several prizes in international competitions, and Storz was the top selling brand in Nebraska starting in World War II. Storz was one of the "Big 4" brewers located in Omaha, which also included the Krug, Willow Springs and Metz breweries. On August 8, 2013, it was announced the brand would be revived by Tom Markel, nephew of Monnie Storz Markel, the granddaughter of Gottlieb Storz, with his cousin John Markel, son of Monnie Storz Markel as investor.

== History ==
Richard Siemon founded an ale brewery called Saratoga Brewery in the town of Saratoga, Nebraska in the early 1860s. It was located at the present-day junction of North 16th Street and Commercial Avenue. By 1863 the company was sold to Ebenezer Dallow, who in turn sold it to Joseph Baumann in 1865. Baumann renamed it the Columbia Brewery. In 1876 Baumann hired a young German immigrant named Gottlieb Storz to become his foreman. Baumann died that year and his widow, Wilhelmina, ran the brewery, naming Storz foreman. In 1884 Storz and a partner named J.D. Iler purchased the brewery. They immediately improved the buildings and machinery, and increased production. In 1891 Storz founded a company called the Omaha Brewing Association to make beer and named himself as president.

According to the Omaha World-Herald, "The Storz brewery pumped out 43 million gallons of beer a year and produced one-third of all the beer sold in Nebraska in 1960. Arthur C. Storz Sr. sold the company in 1966. It went out of business in 1972."

== Building ==
The original Storz Brewery building was located at 1807 North 16th Street on the corner of 16th and Clark Streets. Built for $500,000 in 1893, it was a six-story building constructed from brick, stone and cement that was over 200 feet long. It had red tiled floors and walls with burnished stainless steel and copper fixtures. Storz installed new equipment throughout the building, as well as an ice plant, cold storage, a bottling shop, machine shop and a restaurant. Eventually, the entire facility occupied more than 15 buildings. The original Storz Brewery included a hospitality room patterned after a brew house called "The Frontier Room" and a hunting lodge-style banquet room adorned with the stuffed heads of big game called "The Trophy Room."

== Operations ==
Storz and later, his son Adolph, were precise and efficient brew masters and managers. The new plant was capable of producing 150,000 barrels annually. Storz himself consistently hired new brewers from Germany, where he himself had learned how to brew beer.

Storz faced ongoing political and social pressures against alcohol consumption by religious and moral organizations across Nebraska, and throughout the Midwest. Storz fought statewide legislation calling for the prohibition of alcohol by working closely with the Omaha Brewing Association, the National German-American Alliance and several other organizations. After a number of legislative battles in the 1890s, in 1916 Nebraska voters approved a statewide prohibition amendment. When the law went into effect in 1917, no more alcoholic beverages were allowed to be sold in Nebraska. Nebraska became the 36th state to ratify the Eighteenth Amendment to the United States Constitution on January 16, 1919.

The Storz Brewery started to suffer in 1920, forcing the company to lay off much of its work force. By manufacturing near beer, ginger ale, soft drinks and ice, Storz continued operations. Despite the failure other breweries had with near beer in the 1920s, Storz found success. Early in the 1920s Fred Astaire was a salesman for Storz in Omaha.

Storz went back to business making beer in 1934, and was making up to 150,000 barrels a year by 1935. After avoiding an industry-wide strike that year, Storz's business took off. Gottlieb Storz died in 1939 of a heart attack and his son Adolph became brewery president. Just before World War II Storz became Nebraska's highest seller.

=== Labels ===
The main brands of Storz Brewing Company were Storz Beer, Storz Gold Label, Storz Premium, Storz All Grain and Storz Tap Beer, and were sold in bottles, cans and draft. Starting in the 1940s the company's brewing slogan was "light, dry and smooth. In the first part of the 20th century the brewer manufactured Storz Blue Ribbon. In the 1950s the company manufactured "Storz-ette" beer, which came in an 8-ounce can that had an orchid on the label and a tagline that read "calorie controlled"; they were sold as four-can packages called "Princess Packs."

== Awards ==
The Storz Brewery won medals in international competition at the Trans-Mississippi Exposition in Omaha in 1898, at the Lewis and Clark Centennial Exposition in Portland in 1905, and in Paris in 1912.

== Closure ==
Robert Storz was president of the company in the 1950s and 60s. During that period all small- and medium-sized breweries in the U.S. were under pressure as the big national breweries were trying to expand their market share. After facing antitrust concerns from the federal government for their interest in selling the label to a national brewer, the Storz family sold the brewery and brand name rights to a small investment firm in Storm Lake, Iowa in 1966. Soon after the rights were sold again to the Grain Belt Breweries of Minneapolis, who in 1972 closed the brewery permanently.

== Reopening ==
The Storz Brewing Company reopened on August 8, 2013, in Omaha by Thomas Markel and his cousin John Markel. Storz has 5 major beers dating back to the founding of the brewery with Storz Triumph as its flagship lager, Storz Gold Crest Amber Ale, Storz Wood Duck Wheat, Storz Mugs Pale Ale (named after Mugs a Chesapeake Spaniel born Aug 28, 1936) and Storz Dancing Monks Dopplebock. Seasonal beers include famous historic Storz beer names: Winterbre Porter and Old Saxon Stout. Failure for the brewery to pay its rent and property taxes forced the permanent closure in 2015.

== Ownership history ==
Legal owners
Name	Location	Era
Ebenezer Dallow (Saratoga Brewery)	Omaha	1863–1865
Joseph Baumann (Columbia Brewery)	Omaha	1865–1876
Mrs. W. Baumann (Columbia)	Omaha	1876–1884
Storz & Iler (Columbia)	Omaha	1884–1891
Omaha Brewing Association	Omaha	1891–1901
Storz Brewing Company	Omaha	1901–1917
Storz Beverage & Ice Company	Omaha	1917–1933
Storz Brewing Company	Omaha	1933–1967
Grain Belt Breweries, Inc.	Omaha	1967–1972
Storz Brewing Company	Omaha	2013 - 2015

== See also ==
- History of Omaha
- List of defunct consumer brands
