= Charles Storz House =

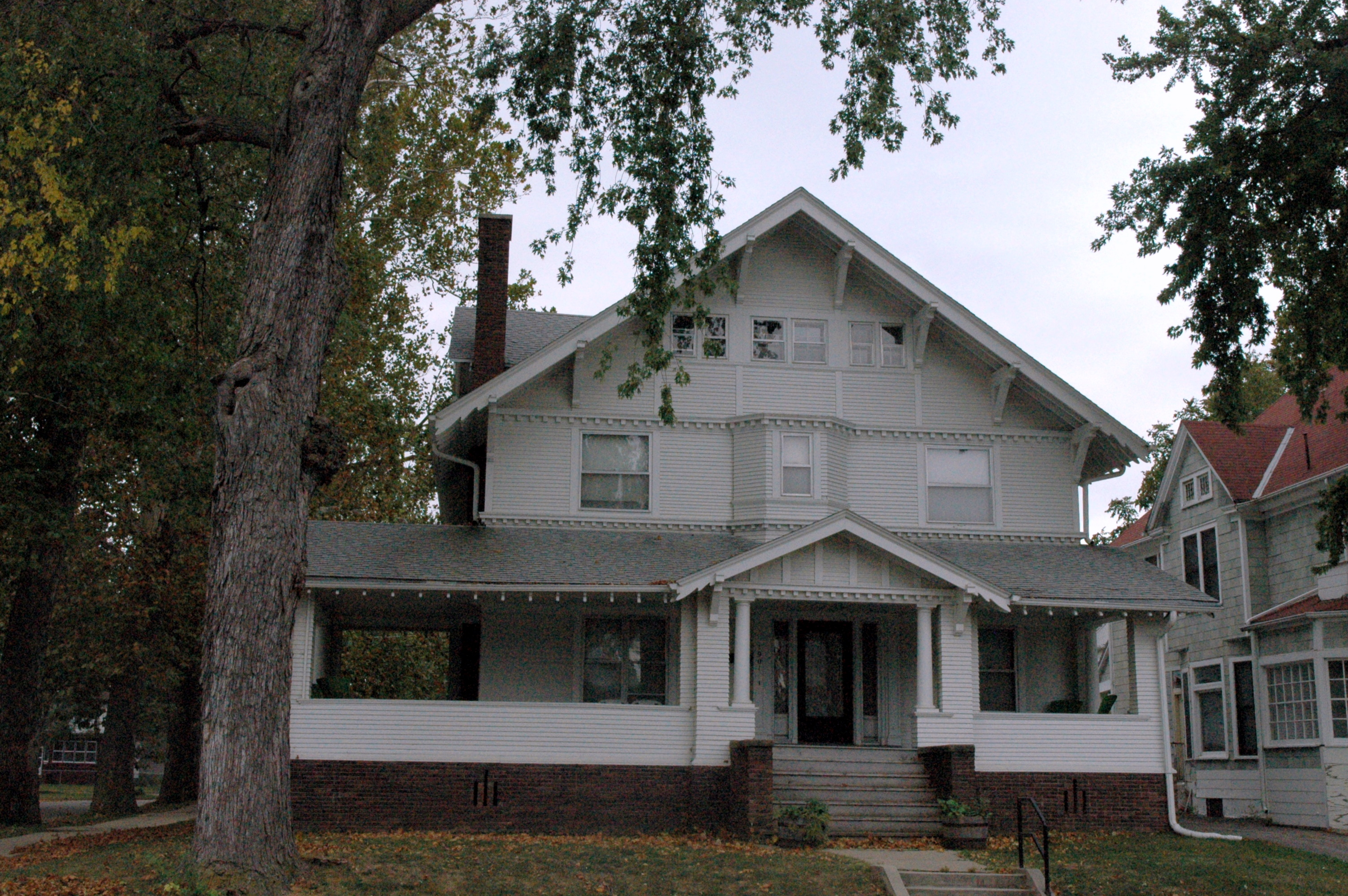
- Charles Storz House

- Location within Nebraska
- 41°17′12″N 95°56′27″W
- Location: Omaha, Nebraska

History
- Built: 1909

Site notes
- Architectural style: Arts and Crafts

Omaha Landmark
- Designated: September 11, 1984

The Charles Storz House is located at 1901 Wirt Street in the Kountze Place neighborhood of North Omaha, Nebraska. The Arts and Crafts style house was designed by the Omaha architectural firm of Fisher and Lawrie and built in 1909. In 1983 it was renovated as a historic preservation project involving the National Trust for Historic Preservation, Landmarks, Inc., the City of Omaha and the Consumer Services Organization. In 1984 it was designated an Omaha Landmark.

== See also ==
- Architecture in North Omaha, Nebraska
- Gottlieb Storz House - Charles' father's house.
