= Top 40 =

40 most popular songs in a genre

In the music industry, the Top 40 is a list of the 40 currently most popular songs in a particular genre. It is the best-selling or most frequently broadcast popular music. Record charts have traditionally consisted of a total of 40 songs. "Top 40" or "contemporary hit radio" is also a radio format.

== History ==
According to producer Richard Fatherley, Todd Storz was the inventor of the format, at his radio station KOWH in Omaha, Nebraska, United States. Storz invented the format in the early 1950s, using the number of times a record was played on jukeboxes to compose a weekly list for broadcast. The format was commercially successful, and Storz and his father Robert, under the name of the Storz Broadcasting Company, subsequently acquired other stations to use the new Top 40 format. In 1989, Todd Storz was inducted into the Nebraska Broadcasters Association Hall of Fame.

The term "Top 40", describing a radio format, appeared in 1960. The Top 40, whether surveyed by a radio station or a publication, was a list of songs that shared only the common characteristic of being newly released. Its introduction coincided with a transition from the old ten-inch 78 rpm record format for single "pop" recordings to the seven-inch vinyl 45 rpm format, introduced in 1949, which was outselling it by 1954 and soon replaced it completely in 1958. The Top 40 thereafter became a survey of the popularity of 45 rpm singles and their airplay on the radio. Some nationally syndicated radio shows, such as American Top 40, featured a countdown of the 40 highest-ranked songs on a particular music or entertainment publication. Although such publications often listed more than 40 charted hits, such as the Billboard Hot 100, time constraints allowed for the airing of only 40 songs; hence, the term "top 40" gradually became part of the vernacular associated with popular music.

An article in the Spring 2012 issue of Nebraska History magazine offered this comment as to Todd Storz's legacy: "the radio revolution that Storz began with KOWH was already sweeping the nation. Thousands of radio station owners had realized the enormous potential for a new kind of radio. When television became popular, social monitors predicted that radio would die. However, because of the invention of Storz and others like him, radio would be reborn".

Storz is credited by some sources as helping to popularize rock and roll music. By the mid-1950s, his station, and the numerous others which eventually adopted the Top 40 format, were playing records by artists such as "Presley, Lewis, Haley, Berry and Domino".

From the 1980s onwards, different recording formats have competed with the 45 rpm vinyl record. This includes cassette singles, CD singles, digital downloads and streaming. Many music charts changed their eligibility rules to incorporate some, or all, of these.

Some disc jockeys presenting Top 40 and similar format programs have been implicated in various payola scandals.

== See also ==
- Contemporary hit radio
- Mainstream Top 40
