= Cisco Suarez =

American television producer and director

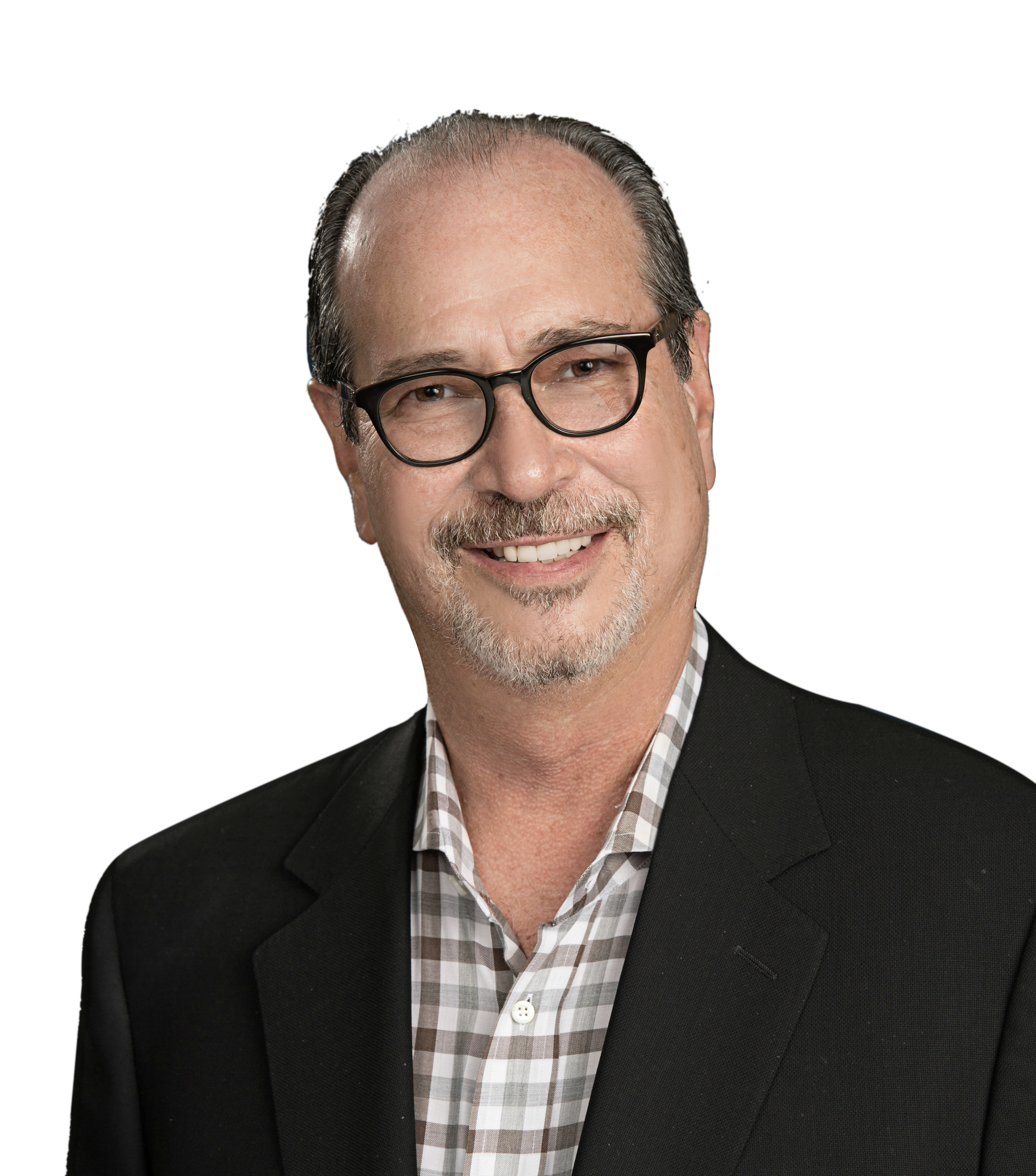
- Francisco "Cisco" Suarez
- Born: Francisco Suarez; April 2, 1956 (age 70); La Habana, Cuba
- Occupation: Independent producer/director
- Years active: 1974–present
- Spouse: Mary Black-Suarez

Francisco Suarez (born April 2, 1956) is an independent producer/director. He was the Senior Vice President of Special Events and Manager at Univision Communications Inc. (UCI), a Spanish language television network. Suarez is a producer/director of many live events and has participated successfully towards Hispanic Americans, including the Latin GRAMMY Awards, Premios Lo Nuestro Latin music awards, and Premios Juventud youth awards. As well as special event productions such as La Banda 2015. Suarez joined UCI as Director of Project Development for the subsidiary TeleFutura in 2001 and became SVP of Special Events for Univision in 2004.

== Early life ==
Suarez was born on April 2, 1956, in Havana, Cuba. At age fourteen, he moved to the United States and began his television career at age seventeen at the local NBC affiliate station, WPTV in West Palm Beach, Florida, in 1974.

== Career ==
While working at WPTV, he was quickly promoted to a Senior Director position, which he held from 1974 until 1979 when he accepted a position at the Miami CBS affiliate station WTVJ directing and producing the 11 o'clock news, A.M. South Florida, the Ralph Renick Report. He was also the technical director of all Miami and Caribbean-based sports events broadcast on CBS. Suarez spent two years as an executive producer and director for the Spanish International Network (S.I.N.) from 1984 to 1985, directing the O.T.I International Festival which was broadcast live to 23 countries, producing and directing news coverage of the Colombian presidential elections, and directing and executive producing the internationally broadcast live program, Mundo Latino.

== Telemundo Network ==
Suarez accepted a position as co-partner on H.B.C Productions at Telemundo in 1985, which was the first international Spanish language newscast on the network. He worked as executive producer and director of the documentary series One Day in the Life of, and directed worldwide broadcasts of the Pope's Mass in Miami. Suarez worked as production manager, executive producer and director of several Telemundo programs, including Estrenos y Estrellas, Día a Día, Esta Noche Con Ud., and Boxeo Mundial. From 1987 to 1992, Suarez held the position of Senior Executive Producer and Creative Director for the Telemundo Network, where he produced all special events and shows and managed the creative aspects of new programs.

== Univision Communications Inc. ==
Univision acquired what was "USA Networks" in 2001, when Suarez began working for the network known as TeleFutura, now called UniMás. He worked as Director of Project Development and Vice President and Director of Operations at TeleFutura until 2004, when he took on the role of Vice President and Director of Special Events at TeleFutura's parent station, Univision Communications Inc. In his position at Univision, Suarez is responsible for producing and directing annual live events such as Premio Lo Nuestro, Premios Juventud youth awards, the Latin Grammy Awards, and the Nuestra Belleza Latina beauty pageant, as well as special events including Selena Vive, a tribute concert to the late singer, Latin Grammy Celebra's event honoring the induction of Marco Antonio Solis into the Latin Grammy Hall of Fame, and the special 20th Anniversary edition of Premio Lo Nuestro. Over the course of his career, Suarez has produced and directed numerous concerts and special events in the United States and Latin America. In Miami, he produced concerts for Placido Domingo, the Bee Gees, Celia Cruz and José Feliciano. He also produced a concert for Chayanne in Puerto Rico, Roberto Carlos in Chile and Julio Iglesias in the Dominican Republic. Other special events he has produced include the International Model Pageant, Miss Hispanidad, Carnaval International – Miami, Aplausos '92, Pan American Festival, Chicago Festival, the New Cork Orchard Beach Festival, and the S.I.N./Telemundo Disney Special.

== Personal life ==
Suarez is married to Mary Black-Suarez, founder, executive producer and entertainment consultant for MBS Entertainment and SOMOS Productions.

== Awards and recognition ==
Suarez has received several Emmy Awards for the programs he has produced, as well as ACE New York Awards, O.T.T.O., Premio Ondas, A.C.C.A. Awards and the Hard's Club Award for Producer of the Year. He has also been recognized by the NATAS (National Academy of Television Arts & Sciences) Suncoast Chapter with a Silver Circle Award for his 25-year career as a producer.
